= Villa Marina (race horse) =

British-bred racehorse

- Sire: Le Havre
- Grandsire: Noverre
- Dam: Briviesca
- Damsire: Peintre Celebre
- Sex: Mare
- Foaled: 7 April 2016
- Country: United Kingdom
- Colour: Bay
- Breeder: Sarl Darpat France
- Owner: Sarl Darpat France
- Trainer: Carlos Laffon-Parias
- Record: 9: 3-2-2
- Earnings: £369,334

Major wins
- Prix de Psyché (2019); Prix de l'Opéra (2019)

Villa Marina (foaled 7 April 2016) is a British-bred, French-trained Thoroughbred racehorse. She was unraced as a juvenile, making her racecourse debut in the spring of 2019. She was beaten in her first four races but after recording her first success in July she made rapid improvement, winning the Prix de Psyché and finishing fourth in the Prix Vermeille before taking the Prix de l'Opéra.

== Background ==
Villa Marina is a bay mare with a narrow white blaze bred in England by her owner Sarl Darpat France. She was sent into training with Carlos Laffon-Parias at Chantilly in France.

She was from the sixth crop of foals sired by Le Havre, who won the Prix du Jockey Club in 2009, and whose other progeny have included Avenir Certain, La Cressonniere and Suedois (Shadwell Turf Mile Stakes).

Villa Marina's dam Briviesca showed good racing ability, winning three races in France and two in the United States. Her granddam Kiliniski won the Lingfield Oaks Trial and finished second in the Yorkshire Oaks: as a granddaughter of the Argentinian broodmare Special (foaled 1969), she was closely related to Sadler's Wells, Fairy King and Nureyev.

== Racing career ==
=== 2019: three-year-old season ===
Villa Marina made her racecourse debut in a maiden race over 1600 metres on soft ground at Saint-Cloud Racecourse in which she started at odds of 6.3/1 and finished third of the eleven runners, two and a half lengths behind the winner Siyarafina. She was beaten in similar events in her next two starts, finishing third to Edisa and Hawkamah over 2100 metres at Maisons-Laffitte Racecourse on 15 May and second to Astonished over 2000 metres at Longchamp Racecourse 13 days later. On 21 June she was stepped up in class for a more competitive event at Chantilly Racecourse and came home second of the six runners, beaten a length by the favourite Aramhes. On 11 July at Longchamp, the filly started 3/5 favourite for a race over 2000 metres at Longchamp in which she was ridden by the apprentice jockey Thomas Trullier. She recorded her first success at her fifth attempt as she disputed the lead from the start, took the lead inside the last 200 metres and kept on well to win by one and three quarter lengths from Stormyza.

The filly was stepped up to Group 2 class on 27 July for the Prix de Psyché over 2000 metres on very soft ground at Deauville Racecourse in which she was ridden by Olivier Peslier and started the 8.6/1 fourth choice in an eight-runner field. Edisa started favourite ahead of Romanciere (runner-up in the Prix Chloé) and Cartiem (winner of the Prix Penelope). Villa Marina raced closely behind the leaders before taking the lead 200 metres out and kept on strongly to win by one and three quarter lengths from Edisa.

On 15 September, the filly was moved to the highest class and matched against older fillies in the Prix Vermeille over 2400 metres at Longchamp. Starting a 20/1 outsider she raced towards the rear of the field before staying on in the straight and finishing fourt behind Star Catcher, Musis Amica and Ligne d'Or. In the Group 1 Prix de l'Opéra over 2000 metres at Longchamp on 9 October the filly was ridden by Peslier and started at odds of 19.9/1. The British-trained Prix de Malleret winner Mehdaayih started favourite while the other ten runners included Watch Me, Terbellum (Prix de la Nonette), With You (Prix Rothschild), Pink Dogwood (runner-up in the Epsom Oaks), Fleeting (May Hill Stakes). Commes (runner-up in the Prix de Diane), Cartiem and Ligne d'Or. Villa Marina raced in mid-division before beginning to make progress 600 metres from the finish. She hit the front 150 metres out and held off the late challenge of Fleeting to win by a short neck. After the race Laffon-Parias said "In the Vermeille, she showed she was at the level to win a group 1. Over 2400 metres, she just flattened out in the final 200 meters, but she showed that over a shorter trip she is a high-class filly. What can I say about Olivier? If he ever retires, I'll stop with him" while Peslier said "She does everything naturally very fast, and while we’ll leave her quiet for a few days before deciding, I think she could be really suited for the Breeders' Cup Filly and Mare Turf."

As Peslier had predicted, Villa Marina ended her season with a trip to California for the Breeders' Cup Filly and Mare Turf at Santa Anita Park on 2 November. She started at odds of 14/1 and despite making progress from the rear of the field she never looked likely to win and came home seventh, six lengths behind the winner Iridessa.

On 4 November, two days after her defeat at Santa Anita, it was announced that Villa Marina had been sold to Alpha Delta Stables and would continue her racing career in the United States under the tutelage of Chad Brown. Before she could race in North America she sustained a tendon injury and was retired from the track to become a broodmare.

== Pedigree ==
Pedigree of Villa Marina (GB), bay mare, 2016
Sire Le Havre (IRE) 2006	Noverre (USA); 1998	Rahy	Blushing Groom (FR)
Sire Le Havre (IRE) 2006	Noverre (USA); 1998	Rahy	Glorious Song (CAN)
Sire Le Havre (IRE) 2006	Noverre (USA); 1998	Danseur Fabuleux	Northern Dancer (CAN)
Sire Le Havre (IRE) 2006	Noverre (USA); 1998	Danseur Fabuleux	Fabuleux Jane
Sire Le Havre (IRE) 2006	Marie Rheinberg (GER); 2002	Surako	Königsstuhl
Sire Le Havre (IRE) 2006	Marie Rheinberg (GER); 2002	Surako	Surata
Sire Le Havre (IRE) 2006	Marie Rheinberg (GER); 2002	Marie d'Argonne (FR)	Jefferson (GB)
Sire Le Havre (IRE) 2006	Marie Rheinberg (GER); 2002	Marie d'Argonne (FR)	Mohair
Dam Briviesca (GB) 2001	Peintre Celebre (USA); 1994	Nureyev	Northern Dancer (CAN)
Dam Briviesca (GB) 2001	Peintre Celebre (USA); 1994	Nureyev	Special
Dam Briviesca (GB) 2001	Peintre Celebre (USA); 1994	Peinture Bleue	Alydar
Dam Briviesca (GB) 2001	Peintre Celebre (USA); 1994	Peinture Bleue	Petroleuse (IRE)
Dam Briviesca (GB) 2001	Kimono (IRE); 1995	Machiavellian (USA)	Mr. Prospector
Dam Briviesca (GB) 2001	Kimono (IRE); 1995	Machiavellian (USA)	Coup de Folie
Dam Briviesca (GB) 2001	Kimono (IRE); 1995	Kiliniski (GB)	Niniski (USA)
Dam Briviesca (GB) 2001	Kimono (IRE); 1995	Kiliniski (GB)	Kilavea (USA) (Family: 5-h)

- Villa Marina is inbred 4 × 4 to Northern Dancer, meaning that this stallion appears twice in the fourth generation of her pedigree.
