= Wonderful Tonight (horse) =

French-bred Thoroughbred racehorse

- Racing silks of Christopher Wright
- Sire: Le Havre
- Grandsire: Noverre
- Dam: Salvation
- Damsire: Montjeu
- Sex: Filly
- Foaled: 7 March 2017
- Country: France
- Colour: Bay
- Breeder: Ecurie La Cauviniere
- Owner: Christopher Wright
- Trainer: David Menuisier
- Record: 10: 6-1-1
- Earnings: £596,203

Major wins
- Prix Minerve (2020); Prix de Royallieu (2020); British Champions Fillies and Mares Stakes (2020); Hardwicke Stakes (2021); Lillie Langtry Stakes (2021)

Wonderful Tonight (foaled on March 7, 2017) is a French-bred, British-trained Thoroughbred racehorse. After winning one minor race as a two-year-old she improved throughout the following season to become one of the best staying fillies in Europe, recording victories in the Prix Minerve, Prix de Royallieu and British Champions Fillies and Mares Stakes. She retired in October 2021.

== Background ==
Wonderful Tonight is a dark bay or brown filly with a white snip bred in France by a partnership headed by the Ecurie La Cauviniere. In August 2018 she was put up for auction at the Arqana sale and bought for €40,000 by the trainer David Menuisier. The filly entered the ownership of Christopher Wright and was taken into training with Menuisier at Pulborough, West Sussex. She was named after the Eric Clapton song of the same name.

She was sired by Le Havre, who won the Prix du Jockey Club in 2009, and whose other foals have included Avenir Certain, La Cressonniere and Suedois (Shadwell Turf Mile Stakes). Wonderful Tonight's dam Salvation showed modest racing ability, winning one minor event from seven track appearances. Salvation's dam Birdie won the Lingfield Oaks Trial and was closely related to Camelot.

== Racing career ==
=== 2019: two-year-old season ===
Wonderful Tonight began her racing career in a one mile maiden race on 25 October at Doncaster Racecourse which saw her start a 25/1 outsider and finish third after staying on well from the rear of the field. She was then sent to France to contest the Prix Pharsale over 2000 metres on heavy ground at Saint-Cloud Racecourse on 22 November. Ridden by Olivier Peslier, and starting the 1.8/1 favourite, she took the lead soon after the start and held on under pressure in the closing stages to win by a short head from Karlarina.

=== 2020: three-year-old season ===
The flat racing season in Europe was disrupted by the COVID-19 pandemic: most of the major spring races were either cancelled or rescheduled and subsequent events were held behind closed doors. Wonderful Tonight began her second campaign by running fourth in the Listed Abingdon Stakes over ten furlongs at Newbury Racecourse on 13 June. She was ridden in her next four races by Tony Piccone, starting with the Listed Prix de Thiberville over 2400 metres at Longchamp Racecourse on 23 July when she disputed the lead for most of the way before being overtaken in the last 200 metres and beaten two and a half lengths into second place by the Aga Khan's filly Valia. She was back in France for the Group 3 Prix de Minerve over 2500 metres at Deauville Racecourse on 16 August and started at odds of 12.8/1 in an eight-runner field which also included Valia (who started favourite), Laburnum (fourth in the Irish Oaks), Paix (Prix Frederic de Lagrange) and Born With Pride (Montrose Stakes). Wonderful Tonight led from the start, fought off several challengers in the straight, and drew away in the final strides to win by two and a half lengths.

On 13 September Wonderful Tonight was stepped up to Group 1 class for the first time to contest the Prix Vermeille over 2400 metres at Longchamp in which she was matched against older fillies and mares and came home fifth of the ten runners, four lengths behind the four-year-old winner Tarnawa. Wonderful Tonight was back at Longchamp on 3 October for the Group 1 Prix de Royallieu over 2800 on heavy ground and started the 4.9/1 favourite against eleven opponents including Manuela de Vega (Lancashire Oaks), Pista (Park Hill Stakes), Ebaiyra (Prix de Pomone), Monica Sheriff (Prix Belle de Nuit) and Miss Yoda (Preis der Diana). After tracking the leaders, Wonderful Tonight overtook the front-running Miss Yoda 600 metres from the finish and stayed on strongly to win by one and a quarter lengths from Pista with five lengths back to Ebaiyra in third place. Menuisier, who watched the race on television, commented "I'm thrilled. She's tough as nails— she never gives up and always tries her hardest... winning a group 1 at Longchamp on Arc weekend is just exceptional."

Two weeks after her win at Longchamp Wonderful Tonight started the 4/1 favourite for the British Champions Fillies and Mares Stakes over one and a half miles at Ascot Racecourse. Her eleven opponents included Dame Malliot (Princess of Wales's Stakes), Antonia de Vega (Princess Royal Stakes), Even So, Mehdaayih (Prix de Malleret), Thundering Nights, Passion (Stanerra Stakes), Laburnum and Manuela de Vega. Ridden by William Buick Wonderful Tonight tracked the leader Manuela de Vega before gaining the advantage three furlongs out and won by two and a half lengths from Dame Malliot. Menuisier said "The only question mark was whether she had recuperated from the Arc weekend or not. I hadn't but I am glad she did! She's top-class all round. She is easy to train... and there is still some improvement to come. She is still a tad keen early on, so once she really knows how to settle I think she can go up a notch again", and suggested that the filly might be aimed at the 2021 Prix de l'Arc de Triomphe. He also described the filly as "like a spider, she's got long legs and it's like she doesn’t make any effort at all".

== Pedigree ==
Pedigree of Wonderful Tonight (FR), bay mare, 2017
| Sire Le Havre (IRE) 2006 | Noverre (USA); 1998 | Rahy | Blushing Groom (FR) |
| Sire Le Havre (IRE) 2006 | Noverre (USA); 1998 | Rahy | Glorious Song (CAN) |
| Sire Le Havre (IRE) 2006 | Noverre (USA); 1998 | Danseur Fabuleux | Northern Dancer (CAN) |
| Sire Le Havre (IRE) 2006 | Noverre (USA); 1998 | Danseur Fabuleux | Fabuleux Jane |
| Sire Le Havre (IRE) 2006 | Marie Rheinberg (GER); 2002 | Surako | Königsstuhl |
| Sire Le Havre (IRE) 2006 | Marie Rheinberg (GER); 2002 | Surako | Surata |
| Sire Le Havre (IRE) 2006 | Marie Rheinberg (GER); 2002 | Marie d'Argonne (FR) | Jefferson (GB) |
| Sire Le Havre (IRE) 2006 | Marie Rheinberg (GER); 2002 | Marie d'Argonne (FR) | Mohair |
| Dam Salvation (GB) 2007 | Montjeu (IRE); 1996 | Sadler's Wells (USA) | Northern Dancer (CAN) |
| Dam Salvation (GB) 2007 | Montjeu (IRE); 1996 | Sadler's Wells (USA) | Fairy Bridge |
| Dam Salvation (GB) 2007 | Montjeu (IRE); 1996 | Floripedes (FR) | Top Ville (IRE) |
| Dam Salvation (GB) 2007 | Montjeu (IRE); 1996 | Floripedes (FR) | Toute Cy |
| Dam Salvation (GB) 2007 | Birdie (GB); 1999 | Alhaarth (IRE) | Unfuwain (USA) |
| Dam Salvation (GB) 2007 | Birdie (GB); 1999 | Alhaarth (IRE) | Irish Valley (USA) |
| Dam Salvation (GB) 2007 | Birdie (GB); 1999 | Fade | Persepolis (FR) |
| Dam Salvation (GB) 2007 | Birdie (GB); 1999 | Fade | One Over Parr (Family: 4-o) |

- Wonderful Tonight is inbred 4 × 4 to Northern Dancer, meaning that this stallion appears twice in the fourth generation of her pedigree.
