= Prix Isonomy =

- Class: Listed
- Location: Deauville-La Touques Racecourse, Deauville, France
- Race type: Flat / Thoroughbred
- Website: france-galop.com

Race information
- Distance: 1,600 metres (1 mile)
- Surface: Turf
- Track: Right-handed
- Qualification: Two-year-olds excluding Listed winners
- Weight: 56 kg Allowances; 1½ kg for fillies Penalties; 2 kg if Group placed
- Purse: €55,000 (2012); 1st: €27,500

Prix Isonomy
2024
Square D'Alboni	Lord Wootton Cen	Dreamliner

Previous years
2023
War Chimes	Sosie	De Sica
2022
Rajapour	Bolshkinov	Greygoria
2021
Mister Saint Paul	Saving Grace	Chancellery

2020-2011
2020
Parchemin	Colosseo	Mouillage
2019
Tammani	Celtic Art	Choise Of Raison
2018
Duke Of Hazzard	Art Du Val	Parafection
2017
Wootton	Alternative Fact	African Sky
2016
Al Wukair	Gold Luck	Hebah
2015
La Cressonniere	Notte Bianca	Secret Existence
2014
Vedouma	Passiflore	Svoul
2013
Under The Radar	Divina Comedia	Aventador
2012
Onedargent	Park Reel	Kokaltash
2011
Exquisite Champion	Hippolyte	Get Happy

2010-2001
2010
Whip And Win	Nova Hawk	Lustre
2009
No Risk At All	Santa Agata	Good Hope
2008
Entre Deux Eaux	Stormy Weather	Hermoun
2007
Vadsalina	Fleurina	Destare
2006
Anabaa's Creation	Une Pivoine	Cadran
2005
Hello Sunday	Lord Tilly	Dream In Blue
2004
Relais D'Aumale	Supercilious	Veyron
2003
Millemix	Barnacle	Noble Request
2002
Vallee Enchantee	Rios	Maxwell
2001
King Solomon	Begueule	Lady Ying

2000-1992
2000
Domedriver	Pushkin	Verdi
1999
Loyal Tartare	Cazoulias	Jean De Luz
1998
Montjeu	Spadoun	Jaskini
1997
Quel Senor	Otavalo	Pulsar
1996
Film Noir	Samapour	Varxi
1995
Supreme Commander	Le Tourron	River Bay
1994
Peckinpah's Soul	Copent Garden	Tzar Rodney
1993
Red Rubin	Mister Jonathan	Luxurious Dancer
1992
Sin Kiang	Nicotera	Betafeu

The Prix Isonomy is a Listed flat horse race in France open to two-year-old thoroughbreds. It is run at Deauville over a distance of 1,600 metres (about 1 mile), and it is scheduled to take place each year in October.

== History ==
The event is named after Isonomy, a successful racehorse in the late 19th century. It was formerly held at Le Tremblay with a distance of 1,100 metres. It used to be staged in early September.

The race was transferred to Évry in the 1970s. For a period it took place in late October or early November. It was contested over 2,000 metres for several years, and shortened to 1,800 metres in 1990.

The Prix Isonomy was run at Saint-Cloud over 1,600 metres in 1996. It was run at Longchamp over 1,800 metres in 1997 and 1998.

The race was restored to 1,600 metres in 1999. For brief periods it was held at Maisons-Laffitte (1999–2000), Saint-Cloud (2001–02) and Fontainebleau (2003–04). It started a longer spell at Saint-Cloud in 2005, and was switched to Chantilly in 2012. Since 2015 the race has been run at Deauville in late October.

== Records ==
Leading jockey since 1978 (5 wins):

- Thierry Jarnet – Subotica (1990), Mon Domino (1991), Sin Kiang (1992), Supreme Commander (1995), Onedargent (2012)

Leading trainer since 1978 (4 wins):

- Robert Collet – Son of Love (1978), Mon Domino (1991), Entre Deux Eaux (2008), Whip and Win (2010)
- David Smaga – Jazz Band (1979), Arneda (1983), Avaleur (1986), Peckinpah's Soul (1994)
- André Fabre – Subotica (1990), Sin Kiang (1992), Supreme Commander (1995), Al Wukair (2016)

Leading owner:

- no owner has won this race more than once since 1978

== Winners since 1978 ==
Year	Winner	Jockey	Trainer	Owner	Time
1978	Son of Love	Alain Lequeux	Robert Collet	Alexis Rolland	2:12.40
1979	Jazz Band	Alain Lequeux	David Smaga	Mrs Gérard Aoudai	2:17.20
1980	Daumont	Yves Saint-Martin	Joseph Audon	Giancarlo Gorrini	2:09.50
1981	Flayosc	Antoine Perrotta	Gérard Philippeau	André Chollou
1982	Ask the Wind	Cash Asmussen	François Boutin	Diana Firestone	2:18.80
1983	Arneda	Freddy Head	David Smaga	Xavier Beau	2:13.40
1984	Premier Role	Maurice Philipperon	John Cunnington Jr.	Paul de Moussac	2:19.00
1985	Juba Dollar	Cash Asmussen	François Boutin	Stavros Niarchos	2:05.90
1986	Avaleur	Alain Lequeux	David Smaga	Ecurie Seutet	2:16.50
1987	Waki River	Alain Lequeux	Bernard Sécly	Jacki Clérico
1988	Plein d'Esprit	Gérald Mossé	Élie Lellouche	Fernand Krief	2:11.96
1989	Noble Ballerina	Éric Legrix	Dominique Sépulchre	Sir Gordon White	2:05.18
1990	Subotica	Thierry Jarnet	André Fabre	Ecurie Demgalop	2:01.20
1991	Mon Domino	Thierry Jarnet	Robert Collet	Henri Chalhoub
1992	Sin Kiang	Thierry Jarnet	André Fabre	Y. Seydoux de Clausonne	2:07.56
1993	Red Rubin	Thierry Gillet	Tony Clout	Serge Plot	2:04.67
1994	Peckinpah's Soul	Pascal Marion	David Smaga	Ecurie Leader	2:06.66
1995	Supreme Commander	Thierry Jarnet	André Fabre	Wafic Saïd	2:01.44
1996	Film Noir	Olivier Doleuze	Criquette Head	Wertheimer et Frère	1:45.00
1997	Quel Senor	Dominique Boeuf	François Doumen	John Martin	2:00.70
1998	Montjeu	Cash Asmussen	John Hammond	Tsega Ltd	2:01.70
1999	Loyal Tartare	Davy Bonilla	Élie Lellouche	Olivier Meyer	1:42.70
2000	Domedriver	Cash Asmussen	Pascal Bary	Niarchos Family	1:45.70
2001	King Solomon	Christophe Soumillon	Paul Cole	Blenheim Partnership	1:48.00
2002	Vallee Enchantee	Dominique Boeuf	Élie Lellouche	Ecurie Wildenstein	1:56.30
2003	Millemix	Ronan Thomas	Criquette Head-Maarek	Alec Head	1:49.00
2004	Relais d'Aumale	Stéphane Pasquier	Mario Hofer	Stall Equie Celli	1:46.40
2005	Hello Sunday	Ronan Thomas	Criquette Head-Maarek	Jean-Pierre Ribes	1:56.80
2006	Anabaa's Creation	Stéphane Pasquier	Alain de Royer-Dupré	William Preston	1:48.30
2007	Vadsalina	Stéphane Pasquier	Alain de Royer-Dupré	HH Aga Khan IV	1:50.40
2008	Entre Deux Eaux	Ioritz Mendizabal	Robert Collet	Jesus / Vidal	1:49.20
2009	No Risk at All	Ioritz Mendizabal	Jean-Paul Gallorini	Sylvia Wildenstein	1:54.00
2010	Whip and Win	Grégory Benoist	Robert Collet	Wingtans / Vidal Family	1:54.50
2011	All Shamar	Andreas Suborics	Waldemar Hickst	Stall Pregel	1:51.90
2012	Onedargent	Thierry Jarnet	Jean-Paul Gallorini	Guy Pariente	1:44.44
2013	Under The Radar	Cristian Demuro	François Doumen	Haras D'Ecouves	1:45.28
2014	Vedouma	Stéphane Pasquier	Alain de Royer-Dupré	HH Aga Khan IV	1:43.36
2015	La Cressonniere	Christophe Soumillon	Jean-Claude Rouget	Caro / Augustin-Normand	1:52.98
2016	Al Wukair	Grégory Benoist	André Fabre	Al Shaqab Racing	1:41.97
2017	Wootton	Mickael Barzalona	Henri-Alex Pantall	Godolphin	1:41.97
2018	Duke Of Hazzard	Christophe Soumillon	Paul Cole	Fitri Hay	1:42.19
2019	Tammani	Pierre-Charles Boudot	William Haggas	Prince A A Faisal	1:51.22
2020	Parchemin	Mickael Barzalona	André Fabre	Godolphin	1:49.08
2021	Mister Saint Paul	Theo Bachelot	E & G Leenders	Bernd Raber	1:47.67
2022	Rajapour	Cristian Demuro	Jean-Claude Rouget	HH Aga Khan IV	1:49.53
2023	War Chimes	Mlle Marie Velon	David Menuisier	Tars Farm Equestrian Stud	1:59.90
2024	Square D'Alboni	Maxime Guyon	Ralph Beckett	The Obank Partnership	2:01.53

== Earlier winners ==
- 1907: Saint Caradec
- 1908: Coronis
- 1909: Vellica
- 1910: Desiree II
- 1911: Jarnac
- 1912: Oukoida
- 1913: Highly
- 1920: Erdaraz
- 1921: Evsonos
- 1922: Black Prince
- 1923: Fauche le But
- 1924: Javoton
- 1925: Evermore
- 1926: Lusignan *
- 1927: Herve
- 1928: Fete Royale
- 1929: Commanderie
- 1930: Cristal
- 1931: Madame du Barry
- 1932: Reynolds
- 1933: Rarity
- 1934: Dulce
- 1935: Ambrose Light
- 1936: Barberybush
- 1937: Blue Star
- 1938: Coeur de Laitue
- 1939: Colporteur
- 1954: Relance
- 1955: Chateau Latour
- 1959: Imberline
- 1961: Prince Altana
- 1962: Nyrcos
- 1964: Nasique
- Addis Ababa finished first in 1926, but she was relegated to second place following a stewards' inquiry.

== See also ==
- List of French flat horse races
