= Prix Djebel =

Flat horse race in France

- Class: Group 3
- Location: Deauville; France
- Inaugurated: 1949
- Race type: Flat / Thoroughbred
- Website: france-galop.com

Race information
- Distance: 1,400 metres (7f)
- Surface: Turf
- Track: Straight
- Qualification: Three-year-old colts and geldings
- Weight: 58 kg
- Purse: €80,000 (2019); 1st: €40,000

Prix Djebel
2025
Maranoa Charlie	Silius	Woodshauna

Previous years
2024
Lazzat	Keran	Devil's Point
2023
Good Guess	Breizh Sky	Belbek
2022
Rock Boy	Loubeisien	My Fancy
2021
Fast Raaj	Pimento	Prince Lancelot

2020-2011
2019
Munitions	Graignes	Amilcar
2018
Dice Roll	Magic Bibou	Batwan
2017
Al Wukair	National Defense	African Ride
2016
Cheikeljack	Attendu	Moon Trouble
2015
Ride Like The Wind	Make Believe	Helene Paragon
2014
Charm Spirit	Kiram	Fight Hero
2013
Style Vendome	Snowday	Penny's Picnic
2012
French Fifteen	Abtaal	Hermival
2011
Surfrider	Havane Smoker	Redemptor

2010-2001
2010
Makfi	Too Nice Name	Silver Black
2009
Le Havre	Naaqoos	Diableside
2008
Salut L'Africain	Elusif	Indigo Blue
2007
US Ranger	Prior Warning	Stoneside
2006
Stormy River	Marchand D'Or	Tsar Xaar
2005
Salut Thomas	Mathematician	Starpix
2004
Whipper	Red Mo	Always King
2003
Green Channel	Vespone	Star Valley
2002
Massalani	Zipping	Skyrock
2001
Greengroom	Amiwain	Domedriver

2000-1991
2000
Danger Over	Onlyman	Cazoulias
1999
Berkoutchi	Restless War	Empireneyev
1998
Ippon	Silic	Roi Gironde
1997
Fantastic Fellow	Nombre Premier	Inkatha
1996
Byzantium	Delegate	Titus Livius
1995
Pennekamp	Bene Erit	Viva Nureyev
1994
Psychobabble	Signe Divin	Sharskao
1993
Kingmambo	Zafonic	Kashani
1992
Cardoun	Vogeluga	Africanus
1991
Ganges	Lycius	Orage Noir

1990-1988
1990
Machiavellian	Ron's Victory	River Of Light
1988
Shaindy	Bulrush	Common Grounds

The Prix Djebel is a Group 3 flat horse race in France open to three-year-old thoroughbred colts and geldings. It is run over a distance of 1,400 metres (about 7 furlongs) at Deauville in April.

== History ==
The event is named after Djebel, a successful French racehorse in the early 1940s. It was established in 1949, and the first running was won by Amour Drake.

For a period the Prix Djebel held Listed status. It was promoted to Group 3 level in 2010. It is currently staged on the same day as the Prix Imprudence, the equivalent race for fillies.

The Prix Djebel can serve as a trial for various colts' Classics in Europe. The last winner to achieve victory in the Poule d'Essai des Poulains was Style Vendome in 2013. The last to win the 2,000 Guineas was Makfi in 2010.

== Records ==
Leading jockey since 1979 (6 wins):

- Olivier Peslier – Fantastic Fellow (1997), Berkoutchi (1999), Massalani (2002), Surfrider (2011), French Fifteen (2012), Charm Spirit (2014)

Leading trainer since 1979 (7 wins):

- François Boutin – Nureyev (1980), Zino (1982), L'Emigrant (1983), Machiavellian (1990), Ganges (1991), Kingmambo (1993), Psychobabble (1994)

Leading owner since 1979 (6 wins):

- Stavros Niarchos – Nureyev (1980), L'Emigrant (1983), Machiavellian (1990), Kingmambo (1993), Psychobabble (1994), Byzantium (1996)

== Winners since 1979 ==
Year	Winner	Jockey	Trainer	Owner	Time
1979	Goodmor	Jean-Pierre Lefèvre	Philippe Lallié	Mabel de Forest
1980	Nureyev	Philippe Paquet	François Boutin	Stavros Niarchos
1981	Diamond Prospect	Alfred Gibert	Mitri Saliba	Mahmoud Fustok	1:25.20
1982	Zino	Freddy Head	François Boutin	Gerry Oldham
1983	L'Emigrant	Cash Asmussen	François Boutin	Stavros Niarchos
1984	Diamada	Alfred Gibert	Georges Bridgland	Mrs Paul Hexter
1985	Dreams to Reality	Éric Legrix	Patrick Biancone	Yazid Saud
1986	Highest Honor	Cash Asmussen	Pascal Bary	Ecurie I. M. Fares	1:34.20
1987	Saint Andrews	Alfred Gibert	Jean-Marie Béguigné	Suzy Volterra
1988	Shaindy	Gerard Bianchi	H. Rossi	René Chanaux	1:28.40
1989	Ocean Falls	Cash Asmussen	André Fabre	Paul de Moussac
1990	Machiavellian	Freddy Head	François Boutin	Stavros Niarchos	1:24.60
1991	Ganges	Gérald Mossé	François Boutin	Allen Paulson	1:26.90
1992	Cardoun	Dominique Boeuf	Élie Lellouche	Edgard Zorbibe	1:26.40
1993	Kingmambo	Cash Asmussen	François Boutin	Stavros Niarchos	1:28.70
1994	Psychobabble	Cash Asmussen	François Boutin	Stavros Niarchos	1:36.20
1995	Pennekamp (Note: The 1995 and 1996 editions were run at Évry over 1,300 metres)	Thierry Jarnet	André Fabre	Sheikh Mohammed	1:17.41
1996	Byzantium	Gérald Mossé	John Hammond	Stavros Niarchos	1:18.93
1997	Fantastic Fellow	Olivier Peslier	Clive Brittain	The Thoroughbred Corp.	1:26.80
1998	Ippon	Jean-René Dubosc	Jean-Claude Rouget	Robert Bousquet	1:34.00
1999	Berkoutchi	Olivier Peslier	Henri-Alex Pantall	Roland Monnier	1:25.70
2000	Danger Over	Thierry Thulliez	Pascal Bary	Khalid Abdullah	1:25.70
2001	Greengroom (Note: The 2001 running was held at Longchamp)	Dominique Boeuf	Carlos Laffon-Parias	Wertheimer et Frère	1:30.20
2002	Massalani	Olivier Peslier	André Fabre	Jean-Luc Lagardère	1:27.00
2003	Mister Charm (Note: The 2003 winner Mister Charm was later exported to Hong Kong and renamed Green Channel)	Ioritz Mendizabal	Jean-Claude Rouget	Lagardère Family	1:26.60
2004	Whipper	Christophe Soumillon	Robert Collet	Richard Strauss	1:28.70
2005	Salut Thomas	Sébastien Maillot	Robert Collet	Roger Jesus	1:29.80
2006	Stormy River	Thierry Thulliez	Nicolas Clément	Ecurie Mister Ess A S	1:30.30
2007	US Ranger	Christophe Lemaire	Jean-Claude Rouget	Michael Tabor	1:23.70
2008	Salut l'Africain	Ioritz Mendizabal	Robert Collet	Mrs Didier Ricard	1:31.90
2009	Le Havre	Christophe Lemaire	Jean-Claude Rouget	G. Augustin-Normand	1:23.00
2010	Makfi	Christophe Lemaire	Mikel Delzangles	Mathieu Offenstadt	1:29.00
2011	Surfrider	Olivier Peslier	Eric Libaud	Michel Delauzun	1:26.90
2012	French Fifteen	Olivier Peslier	Nicolas Clément	Abdullah bin K. Al Thani	1:26.60
2013	Style Vendome	Thierry Thulliez	Nicolas Clément	André de Ganay	1:25.98
2014	Charm Spirit	Olivier Peslier	Freddy Head	Abdullah bin K. Al Thani	1:24.30
2015	Ride Like The Wind	Mickael Barzalona	Freddy Head	Olivier Thomas	1:28.87
2016	Cheikeljack	Vincent Cheminaud	Henri-Alex Pantall	Mme Jacques Cygler	1:28.10
2017	Al Wukair	Grégory Benoist	André Fabre	Al Shaqab Racing	1:23.03
2018	Dice Roll (Note: The 2018 running was held at Deauville)	Cristian Demuro	Fabrice Chappet	Giacomo Algranti	1:28.67
2019	Munitions	Mickael Barzalona	André Fabre	Godolphin	1:25.57
2020	not held
2021	Fast Raaj (Note: The 2021 running was held at Deauville due to the COVID-19 pandemic in France)	Grégory Benoist	Yann Barberot	Ecurie du Parc Monceau, Barberot et al	1:23.18
2022	Rock Boy	Mickael Barzalona	Richard Chotard	Team Calas	1:29.30
2023	Good Guess	Stéphane Pasquier	Fabrice Chappet	Hisaaki Saito	1:29.20
2024	Lazzat	Antonio Oranie	Jerome Reynier	Nurlan Bizakov	1:29.92
2025	Maranoa Charlie	Aurélien Lemaitre	Christopher Head	Peter Maher, Carl Fitzgerald and John Baxter	1:23.12
2026	Afandy	Cristian Demuro	Jean-Claude Rouget	Al Shaqab Racing	1:20.73

.

== Earlier winners ==
- 1949: Amour Drake
- 1950: Ensorceleur
- 1952: Guersant
- 1954: Damelot
- 1955: Beau Prince
- 1956: Philius
- 1957: Chronos
- 1958: Val d'Oisans
- 1959: Taboun
- 1960: Venture
- 1961: L'Epinay
- 1962: Prince Altana
- 1963: Aigle Gris
- 1964: Takawalk
- 1965: The Marshal
- 1966: Kashmir
- 1967: Astec
- 1968: Sun Sun
- 1969: Don II
- 1970: Roi Soleil
- 1972: Big Bead
- 1973: Targowice
- 1974: Northern Taste
- 1976: Vitiges
- 1977: Hasty Reply
- 1978: Solanum

== See also ==
- List of French flat horse races
