= Alice Springs (horse) =

Irish-bred Thoroughbred racehorse

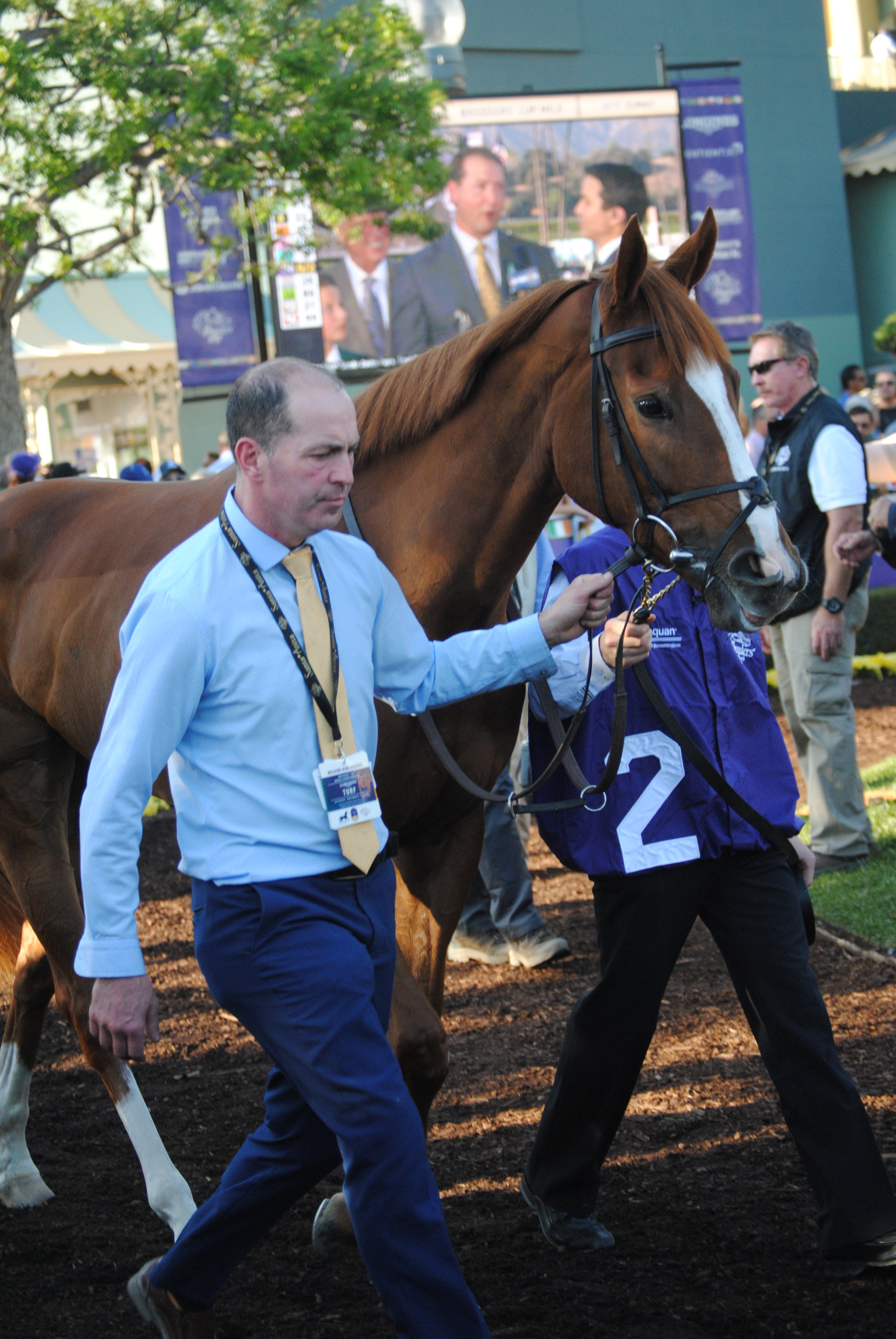
- Alice Springs at the 2016 Breeders' Cup
- Sire: Galileo
- Grandsire: Sadler's Wells
- Dam: Aleagueoftheirown
- Damsire: Danehill Dancer
- Sex: Mare
- Foaled: 4 May 2013
- Country: Ireland
- Colour: Chestnut
- Breeder: Lynch-Bages & Longfield Stud
- Owner: Susan Magnier, Michael Tabor & Derrick Smith
- Trainer: Aidan O'Brien
- Record: 17: 5-3-4
- Earnings: £848,853

Major wins
- Tattersalls Millions 2yo Fillies' Trophy (2015); Falmouth Stakes (2016); Matron Stakes (2016); Sun Chariot Stakes (2016)

Alice Springs (foaled 4 May 2013) is an Irish Thoroughbred racehorse. As a two-year-old in 2015 she failed to win a group race but showed consistently high-class form, winning a valuable sales race, finishing second in the Silver Flash Stakes and the Breeders' Cup Juvenile Fillies Turf, third in the Moyglare Stud Stakes and fourth in the Cheveley Park Stakes. In the following year she was beaten in her first four races but finished third in both the 1000 Guineas and the Coronation Stakes. She then won three Group One races in her next four starts taking the Falmouth Stakes, Matron Stakes and Sun Chariot Stakes.

== Background ==
Alice Springs is chestnut mare with a white blaze and four white socks bred in Ireland by Lynch-Bages & Longfield Stud. She was sired by Galileo, who won the Derby, Irish Derby and King George VI and Queen Elizabeth Stakes in 2001. Galileo is now one of the world's leading stallions and has been champion sire of Great Britain and Ireland five times. His other progeny include Cape Blanco, Frankel, Found, Nathaniel, New Approach, Rip Van Winkle, Ruler of the World, and Minding. Alice Springs's dam A league of their own showed limited racing ability, winning one race from twelve starts between 2006 and 2009. She was a granddaughter of Optimistic Lass, who won the Nassau Stakes in 1984 and was the female-line ancestor of Golden Opinion and the Irish 1,000 Guineas winner Samitar.

As a yearling Alice Springs was offered for sale at Tattersalls in October 2014 and was bought for 550,000 guineas by Michael Magnier on behalf of his father, John Magnier's Coolmore Stud organisation. She was sent into training with Aidan O'Brien at Ballydoyle. Like many Coolmore horses, the official details of her ownership have changed from race to race: she has sometimes been listed as being the property of Susan Magnier, whilst on other occasions she has been described as being owned by a partnership of Magnier, Michael Tabor, and Derrick Smith.

== Racing career ==
=== 2015: two-year-old season ===
Alice Springs made her racecourse debut in a seven furlong maiden race at the Curragh on 26 June in which she was ridden by Seamie Heffernan and started the 6/4 favourite against eleven other fillies. She took the lead in the final furlong and went clear to win "going away" by two and a half lengths from the Jim Bolger-trained Siamsaiocht. She was immediately moved up to Group Three class and started favourite for the Silver Flash Stakes over the same distance at Leopardstown Racecourse in July but was beaten one and a quarter lengths by the Dermot Weld-trained Tanaza. In August at the Curragh she was one of three Ballydoyle runners to contest the Group Two Debutante Stakes and finished fifth behind her stablemates Ballydoyle and Minding.

On 13 September Alice Springs was moved up to Group One level for the Moyglare Stud Stakes at the Curragh and finished third beaten three quarters of a length and half a length by Minding and Ballydoyle. Two weeks later she was sent to England and dropped in distance to contest the Group One Cheveley Park Stakes over six furlongs at Newmarket Racecourse. Ridden by Ryan Moore she kept on well in the closing stages and finished fourth, one and a half lengths behind the winner Lumiere. Seven days later she returned to Newmarket for the Tattersalls Millions 2yo Fillies' Trophy, a race restricted to fillies sold at Tattersalls. Ridden by Moore she started 2/5 favourite with the best-fancied of her eleven opponents being her fellow Irish raider Clear Skies. After tracking the leaders she took the lead approaching the final furlong and drew away to win "comfortably" by four lengths.

On her final appearance of the season Alice Springs was sent to the United States and started 7/4 favourite for the Breeders' Cup Juvenile Fillies Turf at Keeneland Racecourse on 30 October. After starting slowly she squeezed through a gap on the rail to make her challenge in the final furlong but was beaten three quarters of a length into second by Catch A Glimpse.

=== 2016: three-year-old season ===
==== Spring ====
On her three-year-old debut Alice Springs started favourite for the Leopardstown 1,000 Guineas Trial Stakes on heavy ground on 10 April but never looked likely to win and finished third behind Jet Setting and Now Or Never. On 1 May she contested the 203rd running of the 1000 Guineas over the Rowley mile at Newmarket in which she started a 16/1 outsider and finished third of the sixteen runners behind Minding and Ballydoyle. Two weeks after her run in the Newmarket classic she started at odds of 3/1 in the French equivalent, the Poule d'Essai des Pouliches over 1600 metres at Deauville Racecourse but faded in the closing stages and finished seventh behind La Cressonniere.

==== Summer ====
On 17 June Alice Springs was back in England for the Group One Coronation Stakes at Royal Ascot and produced a much better effort. After racing towards the rear of the field and then being repeatedly obstructed as Moore attempted to obtain a clear run, she finished strongly and finished third behind Qemah and Nemoralia, with Jet Setting, Tanaza and Now Or Never among the beaten horses. On her next appearance Alice Springs was matched against older fillies and mares for the first time in the Group One Falmouth Stakes over one mile at Newmarket's July course. She started the 5/2 second favourite behind the French four-year-old Usherette (Duke of Cambridge Stakes), whilst the best-fancied of the five runners was the five-year-old mare Amazing Maria who had won the race in 2015. She raced in third place behind the outsiders Very Special and Irish Rookie before taking the lead a furlong out. She stayed on well despite drifting to the right in the closing stages to win by two and a quarter lengths and a nose from Very Special and Always Smile in a new track record time of 1.34.24. After the race Ryan Moore said "She's definitely improving. The trainer said that beforehand and he's usually right. I was in front earlier than I would have liked but the way the race was run I had no choice".

At the end of July Alice Springs returned to Deauville and started favourite for the Group One Prix Rothschild. Her second visit to France turned out to be another disappointment as she finished eight of the ten runners behind Qemah after being eased down by Moore the last 200 metres when her winning chance had gone.

==== Autumn ====
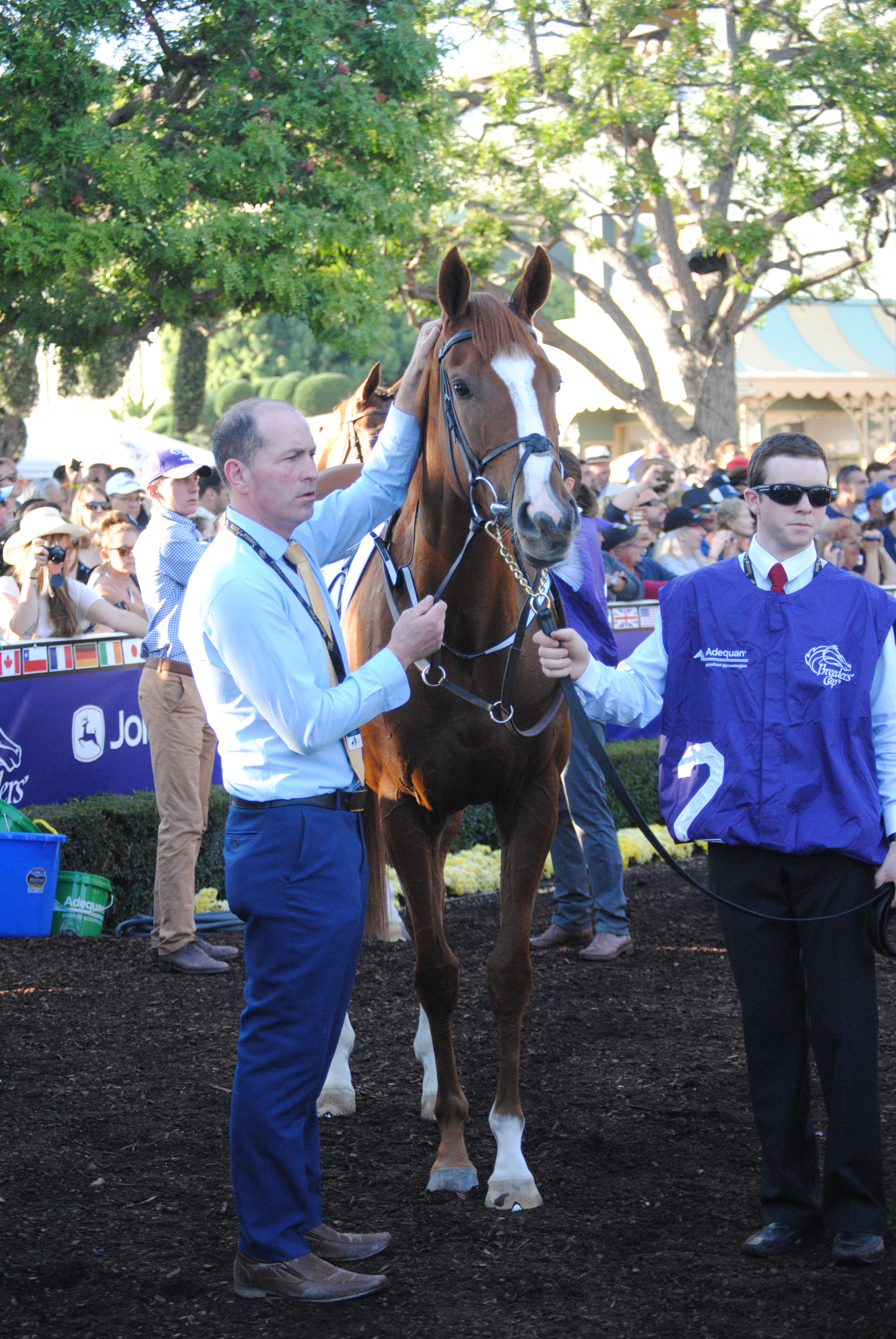
Alice Springs at the 2016 Breeders' Cup

On 10 September she made her first appearance in her native country for five months when she met Qemah for the third time in the Group One Matron Stakes over a mile at Leopardstown. Qemah started favourite ahead of the undefeated British filly Persuasive with Alice Springs the 5/1 third choice in the betting in an eight-runner field which also included Jet Setting, Now Or Never and the German 1,000 Guineas winner Hawksmoor. Moore restrained the filly and was still in last place with two furlongs to run, but Alice Springs produced a strong run on the outside, took the lead 150 yards from the finish and drew clear to win by three and a quarter lengths from Persuasive. After the race O'Brien said "It was a bit of a disaster in France. She went and it was shifty, patchy ground in Deauville. Ryan knew she wasn't going to be involved so he just minded her. She's a very good filly. You saw what she did in the Falmouth as well. She has a lot of speed. She quickened up very well. She's very pacey."

Three weeks after her win at Leopardstown the filly was back in England for the Group One Sun Chariot Stakes at Newmarket and was made the 13/8 favourite in an eight-runner field. Always Smile and Irish Rookie were again in opposition whilst her other rivals included Ervedya (winner of the Poule d'Essai des Poulins, Coronation Stakes and Prix du Moulin in 2015), Volta (runner-up in the Prix Rothschild) and Arabian Queen. After racing in fourth place she made a forward move in the last quarter mile and went to the front approaching the final furlong. She kept on well under pressure in the closing stages and won by three quarters of a length from Always Smile with Ervedya a length away in third place. After the race Moore said "She picked up very well and she was just dozing a little bit when I got serious with her, but she found a bit more". When asked about the filly's prospects in the Breeders' Cup Mile he added "Santa Anita will suit her, but Tepin will be hard to beat".

Alice Springs did contest the Breeders' Cup Mile on 5 November and started the 4.2/1 fourth choice in the betting behind Limato, Tepin and Ironicus. She made little impact in the race and finished tenth of the fourteen runners behind Tourist.

=== 2017: four-year-old season ===
On her first appearance of 2017, Alice Springs started 6/4 favourite for the Gladness Stakes over seven furlongs at Naas Racecourse on 9 April but after briefly taking the lead in the final furlong she was overtaken and beaten half a length by Diamond Fields, to whom she was conceding five pounds in weight.

== Pedigree ==
Pedigree of Alice Springs (IRE), chestnut filly, 2013
Sire Galileo (IRE) 1998	Sadler's Wells (USA); 1981	Northern Dancer	Nearctic
Sire Galileo (IRE) 1998	Sadler's Wells (USA); 1981	Northern Dancer	Natalma
Sire Galileo (IRE) 1998	Sadler's Wells (USA); 1981	Fairy Bridge	Bold Reason
Sire Galileo (IRE) 1998	Sadler's Wells (USA); 1981	Fairy Bridge	Special
Sire Galileo (IRE) 1998	Urban Sea (USA); 1989	Miswaki	Mr. Prospector
Sire Galileo (IRE) 1998	Urban Sea (USA); 1989	Miswaki	Hopespringseternal
Sire Galileo (IRE) 1998	Urban Sea (USA); 1989	Allegretta	Lombard
Sire Galileo (IRE) 1998	Urban Sea (USA); 1989	Allegretta	Anatevka
Dam Aleagueoftheirown (IRE) 2004	Danehill Dancer (IRE); 1993	Danehill	Danzig
Dam Aleagueoftheirown (IRE) 2004	Danehill Dancer (IRE); 1993	Danehill	Rayana
Dam Aleagueoftheirown (IRE) 2004	Danehill Dancer (IRE); 1993	Mira Adonde	Sharpen Up
Dam Aleagueoftheirown (IRE) 2004	Danehill Dancer (IRE); 1993	Mira Adonde	Lettre d'Amour
Dam Aleagueoftheirown (IRE) 2004	Golden Coral (USA); 1997	Slew o' Gold	Seattle Slew
Dam Aleagueoftheirown (IRE) 2004	Golden Coral (USA); 1997	Slew o' Gold	Alluvial
Dam Aleagueoftheirown (IRE) 2004	Golden Coral (USA); 1997	Optimistic Lass	Mr. Prospector
Dam Aleagueoftheirown (IRE) 2004	Golden Coral (USA); 1997	Optimistic Lass	Loveliest (Family 2-f)

- Alice Springs is inbred 4 × 4 to Mr. Prospector, meaning that this stallion appears twice in the fourth generation of her pedigree.
