= Amazing Maria =

Irish-bred Thoroughbred racehorse

- Racing silks of Robert Ogden
- Sire: Mastercraftsman
- Grandsire: Danehill Dancer
- Dam: Messias da Silva
- Damsire: Tale of the Cat
- Sex: Mare
- Foaled: 28 January 2011
- Country: Ireland
- Colour: Grey
- Breeder: Robert Ogden
- Owner: Robert Ogden
- Trainer: Ed Dunlop; David O'Meara
- Record: 18: 5-0-4
- Earnings: £405,274

Major wins
- Prestige Stakes (2013); Duke of Cambridge Stakes (2015); Falmouth Stakes (2015); Prix Rothschild (2015)

Amazing Maria (foaled 28 January 2011) is an Irish-bred, British-trained Thoroughbred retired racehorse and broodmare. She showed great promise as a two-year-old when winning the Prestige Stakes but failed to win or place in the following season when she made only three appearances. After a change of training stable she returned as a four-year-old and reached her peak in the summer of 2015. She won the Duke of Cambridge Stakes at Royal Ascot and then recorded Group One victories in the Falmouth Stakes and the Prix Rothschild. She remained in training in 2016 but failed to win in five races and was retired at the end of the season.

== Background ==
Amazing Maria is a grey mare bred in Ireland by her owner Sir Robert Ogden. Ogden is best known as an owner of National Hunt horses including See More Business, Voy Por Ustedes and Exotic Dancer. The filly was initially sent into training with Ed Dunlop at Newmarket, Suffolk.

She was one of the first crop of foals of Mastercraftsman, which also included The Grey Gatsby and Kingston Hill. As a two-year-old Mastercraftsman won the Group 1 Phoenix Stakes and National Stakes and was crowned Cartier Champion Two-year-old Colt in 2008. As a three-year-old he went on to record victories in the Irish 2,000 Guineas and St. James's Palace Stakes before being retired to stud. Amazing Maria's dam Messias da Silva showed very modest racing ability, winning one minor race at Lingfield Park Racecourse in 2007 from six starts. She was descended from the American broodmare Wise Ally who was the ancestor of several other major winners including Alydeed and Fourstars Allstar.

== Racing career ==
=== 2013: two-year-old season ===
Amazing Maria made her racecourse debut in a maiden race over seven furlongs at Newbury Racecourse on 25 June. Ridden by Frankie Dettori she started at odds of 6/1 and finished seventh, six and a quarter lengths behind the winner Gold Top. In July she was dropped in distance for a six furlong maiden at the same track and finished strongly to take third place behind J Wonder and Autumn Sunrise. On 1 August in a seven furlong maiden at Goodwood Racecourse she recorded her first success as she accelerated clear of her opponents in the last quarter mile and won by six lengths from Inchila despite being eased down by Dettori in the final strides. Twenty-three days over the same course and distance Amazing Maria was stepped up in class for the Group Three Prestige Stakes in which she was ridden by the French jockey Gerald Mosse. She was made the 6/4 favourite ahead of six opponents headed by Midnite Angel (runner-up in the Sweet Solera Stakes) and Qawaasem (runner-up in the Star Stakes). She took the lead from the start, went clear of the field in the last quarter mile and never looked in danger of defeat, winning by two and a half lengths from Qawaasem. Dunlop commented "I think the ground looks a bit slower than she wanted but she did it well. We've always thought the world of her and we will enjoy today. We'll see how she is but we'll have to think about the Fillies' Mile".

=== 2014: three-year-old season ===
Amazing Maria was expected to return in the 2014 1000 Guineas but was withdrawn from the race after showing signs of having contracted a respiratory infection. She made her first appearance for nine months in The Oaks over one and a half miles 6 June in which she finished tailed-off last of the seventeen runners behind Taghrooda. She was then dropped in class and distance when she was sent to France for the Group Three Prix de Lieurey over 1600 metres at Deauville Racecourse in August but after leading for most of the way she faded badly in the closing stages and finished eleventh of the twelve runners behind Bawina. The Sceptre Stakes at Doncaster Racecourse in September as she started a 25/1 outsider and finished unplaced.

At the end of the year, Amazing Maria left Dunlop's yard and joined the stable of David O'Meara at Upper Helmsley in North Yorkshire.

=== 2015: four-year-old season ===
On her first appearance for her new trainer Amazing Maria carried a weight of 136 pounds in a handicap race over one mile at Ascot Racecourse on 9 May and finished third behind Temptress (129 pounds) and Solar Magic (135). Two weeks later she was sent to Ireland for the Group Two Lanwades Stud Stakes at the Curragh Racecourse and stayed on well in the closing stages to take third place behind the odds-on favourite Brooch. On 17 June at Royal Ascot Amazing Maria, ridden by James Doyle, started a 25/1 outsider in a six-runner field for the Duke of Cambridge Stakes over the straight mile course. Integral started favourite ahead of Rizeena, Cladocera (The Balanchine) and Bragging (Dahlia Stakes), with the only other runner being Lightning Thunder (runner-up in the 1000 Guineas). After being restrained towards of the rear of the field, she moved into second place approaching the final furlong before overtaking Rizeena and drawing away in the last 100 yards to win by two lengths. After the race Doyle commented "It was a funny race, we went a slow pace early and then dashed in the last two furlongs. I thought the ground might be a bit quick but she quickened up well". O'Meara explained "We’ve ended up with a nice filly. "She came to Ascot on her first run for me but probably hit the front a little soon, we didn’t know her that well. Then she ran on soft ground, which we thought she’d like, but she's shown today she obviously wants it faster".

Amazing Maria was stepped back up to Group One class for the Falmouth Stakes over one mile at Newmarket Racecourse in which she was again ridden by Doyle. The 1000 Guineas runner-up Lucida started favourite ahead of Avenir Certain, Bawina and Fintry (Prix Bertrand du Breuil) with Amazing Maria next in the betting on 17/2. The other two runners were Arabian Queen and the Beverly D. Stakes winner Euro Charline. The grey filly was held up towards the rear, before being switched left by Doyle to make her challenge approaching the last quarter mile. Euro Charline took the lead from Arabian Queen a furlong out but Amazing Maria gained the advantage in the last 100 yards and won by a length, with Euro Charline getting the best of a five-way photo-finish for second place. Doyle said "A lot of people thought it might have been a fluke at Ascot, but I could only say what I felt on the day and I felt she was a class filly. I didn't want today to get away from that, so I rode her with plenty of confidence and I knew at halfway it was a game of cat and mouse as we were going real steady. I knew if I got first jump on them, she's honest and would hit the line well." O'Meara commented "She traveled well today and moved to within a striking position quite easily for James. When he went for her, she found plenty. I suppose the Prix Rothschild would be the obvious race for her."

Olivier Peslier took over from Doyle on 2 August when Amazing Maria, as predicted, was sent to France for the Group One Prix Rothschild over 1600 metres at Deauville Racecourse and started the 5.5/1 third choice in the betting behind Ervedya and Bawina. The other five runners were Rizeena, Fintry, the unbeaten three-year-old Usherette, Odeliz (a Group Three winner in Germany) and Amulet. Amazing Maria raced in mid division before moving up into second place behind Avenir Certain 300 metres from the finish. She overtook the favourite 100 metres out and drew ahead to win by one and a quarter lengths. O'Meara commented "It's brilliant, she is obviously a very good filly. There was probably some doubt about whether she was truly a Group One filly after Royal Ascot, but she's done it again twice since then and you’d have to say she's among the best fillies in Europe now... there was no real plan going out. Olivier knows Deauville much better than me, I’ve never had a runner here before. I just told him to go out and try and win.".

In September Amazing Maria was sent to Ireland for the Matron Stakes at Leopardstown and started the 15/8 second favourite in a nine-runner field. She raced in third place but began to struggle approaching the last quarter mile and finished seventh behind Legatissimo.

=== 2016: five-year-old season ===
Amazing Maria began her fourth campaign on 1 May in the Dahlia Stakes over nine furlongs at Newmarket in which she finished third of the nine runners behind Usherette and Arabian Queen. At Royal Ascot in June she started a 20/1 outsider for a strongly-contested edition of the Queen Anne Stakes and finished sixth behind Tepin, Belardo, Lightning Spear, Toormore and Ervedya. In July she attempted to repeat her 2015 success in the Falmouth Stakes but made little impact and finished last of the seven runners behind Alice Springs. In the Prix Rothschild she raced prominently and took the lead 400 metres out but was soon overtaken and finished sixth of the ten runners behind the three-year-old Qemah. On her final appearance the mare was dropped back to Group Two class for the Joel Stakes at Newmarket on 23 September and started at odds of 9/2 against five opponents. She raced in third place for most of the way but was unable to quicken in the final furlong and finished fourth behind the Aidan O'Brien-trained Cougar Mountain.

== Assessment and awards ==
In the 2015 World's Best Racehorse Rankings Amazing Maria was given a rating of 117, making her the ninth best older female and the 97th best horse in the world.

== Breeding record ==
Amazing Maria was retired from racing to become a broodmare for her owner's stud. Her first foal was a filly sired by Dubawi and named Amazing Grace.

== Pedigree ==
Pedigree of Amazing Maria (IRE), grey mare, 2011
| Sire Mastercraftsman (IRE) 2006 | Danehill Dancer (IRE); 1993 | Danehill | Danzig |
| Sire Mastercraftsman (IRE) 2006 | Danehill Dancer (IRE); 1993 | Danehill | Razyana |
| Sire Mastercraftsman (IRE) 2006 | Danehill Dancer (IRE); 1993 | Mira Adonde | Sharpen Up |
| Sire Mastercraftsman (IRE) 2006 | Danehill Dancer (IRE); 1993 | Mira Adonde | Lettre d'Amour |
| Sire Mastercraftsman (IRE) 2006 | Starlight Dreams (USA); 1995 | Black Tie Affair | Miswaki |
| Sire Mastercraftsman (IRE) 2006 | Starlight Dreams (USA); 1995 | Black Tie Affair | Hat Tab Girl |
| Sire Mastercraftsman (IRE) 2006 | Starlight Dreams (USA); 1995 | Reves Celestes | Lyphard |
| Sire Mastercraftsman (IRE) 2006 | Starlight Dreams (USA); 1995 | Reves Celestes | Tobira Celeste |
| Dam Messias da Silva (USA) 2005 | Tale of the Cat (USA); 1994 | Storm Cat | Storm Bird |
| Dam Messias da Silva (USA) 2005 | Tale of the Cat (USA); 1994 | Storm Cat | Terlingua |
| Dam Messias da Silva (USA) 2005 | Tale of the Cat (USA); 1994 | Yarn | Mr. Prospector |
| Dam Messias da Silva (USA) 2005 | Tale of the Cat (USA); 1994 | Yarn | Narrate |
| Dam Messias da Silva (USA) 2005 | Indy Power (USA); 1997 | A.P. Indy | Seattle Slew |
| Dam Messias da Silva (USA) 2005 | Indy Power (USA); 1997 | A.P. Indy | Weekend Surprise |
| Dam Messias da Silva (USA) 2005 | Indy Power (USA); 1997 | Clever Power | Lines of Power |
| Dam Messias da Silva (USA) 2005 | Indy Power (USA); 1997 | Clever Power | Clever Miss (Family: 9) |
