= Jet Setting =

Irish Thoroughbred racehorse

- Racing silks of Julie Wood & Equinegrowthpartners Syndicate
- Sire: Fast Company
- Grandsire: Danehill Dancer
- Dam: Mean Lae
- Damsire: Johannesburg
- Sex: Mare
- Foaled: 16 February 2013
- Country: Ireland
- Colour: Bay
- Breeder: P Kelly
- Owner: Julie Wood; Equinegrowthpartners Syndicate; China Horse Club
- Trainer: Richard Hannon Jr. Adrian Paul Keatley
- Record: 13: 4-2-1
- Earnings: £200,121

Major wins
- Leopardstown 1,000 Guineas Trial (2016); Irish 1,000 Guineas (2016); Concorde Stakes (2016)

Jet Setting (foaled 16 February 2013) is an Irish thoroughbred racehorse. Initially trained in England she showed some promise as a juvenile despite failing to win in five races. After being transferred to Ireland she won the Leopardstown 1,000 Guineas Trial on her 2016 debut and then recorded an upset victory over Minding in the Irish 1,000 Guineas. Having been sold for €7,000 as a foal she was auctioned after her Irish Guineas win for £1,300,000. She went on to win the Concorde Stakes against male opposition before being retired at the end of her three-year-old career. She was rated the third-best three-year-old filly in the world in 2016.

== Background ==
Jet Setting is a bay mare with a white star and snip and white socks on her hind feet bred in Ireland by P Kelly. As a foal in November 2013 the filly was offered for sale at Goffs and was acquired for €7,000 by Woodstaock. She entered the ownership of Julie Wood and was sent into training with Richard Hannon Jr. East Everleigh in Wiltshire

She was from the second crop of foals sired by Fast Company, a stallion who raced only as a two-year-old in 2007 when he won the Acomb Stakes and finished second in the Dewhurst Stakes. The best of his other progeny have included Robert Bruce (Arlington Million), Safe Voyage (John of Gaunt Stakes) and Devonshire (Lanwades Stud Stakes).

Jet Setting's dam Mean Lae (Irish for "noon") showed very modest racing ability, winning one minor handicap race at Dundalk Racecourse from fifteen attempts. She was a great-granddaughter of Miss Boniface who won the Ribblesdale Stakes and the Lupe Stakes in 1988. Jet Setting's female ancestry was not, technically Thoroughbred as it could not be traced to one of the foundation mares of the breed. She was a product of the half-bred Verdict family, whose ancestry could be traced no further back than an unnamed mare foaled in 1837. So many non-thoroughbreds from this family won major races that they were admitted to the General Stud Book in 1969 as Half-Bred Family 3. Members of this family include Quashed, Attraction and Sonic Lady.

== Racing career ==
=== 2015: two-year-old season ===
On her racecourse debut, Jet Setting contested a maiden race over five furlongs at Leicester Racecourse on 10 April in which she started at odds of 7/2 and finished fourth of the six runners, three lengths behind the winner Gin at the Inn. She went on to finish a close second in maiden races at Brighton on 21 April and at Newmarket on 29 May. After a break of over three months the filly returned in a two-year-old handicap at Doncaster Racecourse in which she was assigned a weight of 131 pounds and finished eighth behind Nemoralia.

In October Jet Setting was offered for sale at Tattersalls and was sold to Kilbride Equine for 12,000 guineas. She was then transferred to Ireland where she entered the stable of Adrian Paul Keatley at Friarstown, County Kildare. On her first run for her new trainer Jet Setting was sent to France and moved up in class for the Listed Prix Herod over 1400 metres at Chantilly Racecourse in November. Racing on heavy ground she started a 23/1 outsider and finished third of the seven runners behind La Cressonniere.

=== 2016: three-year-old season ===
==== Spring ====
In the first half of 2016 Jet Setting raced in the colours of the Equinegrowthpartners Syndicate. She began her second season in a maiden race over eight and a half furlongs on heavy ground at Cork Racecourse on 26 March in which she was ridden for the first time by Shane Foley who became her regular jockey. Racing against less experienced rivals she started 2/1 favourite and drew away in the last furlong and a half to win "comfortably" by two and a half lengths from the Dermot Weld trained Creme e La, with a gap of ten lengths back to the third placed horse. The ground was heavy again fifteen days later when the filly was stepped up in class for the Group Three 1000 Guineas Trial over seven furlongs at Leopardstown Racecourse and started the 11/2 second choice in the betting behind the Aidan O'Brien-trained Alice Springs. After being sent to the front by Foley from the start she broke clear of her opponents at half way and stayed on well to win by three lengths from Now Or Never with Alice Springs in third.

Jet Setting was then sent to England for the 203rd running of the 1000 Guineas on 1 May over Newmarket's Rowley Mile. Racing on faster ground she started a 33/1 outsider and finished ninth of the sixteen runners behind Minding after being hampered a furlong from the finish. The ground was softer three weeks later when the filly contested the Irish 1000 Guineas at the Curragh and started third favourite behind Minding and Now Or Never, who had won the Derrinstown Stud 1,000 Guineas Trial. She had not been among the original entries for the race, meaning that her owners had to pay a supplementary fee of €30,000 to secure a place in the field. The other runner included Coolmore (C. L. Weld Park Stakes), Pretty Perfect (Salsabil Stakes) and Tanaza (Silver Flash Stakes). Jet Setting raced in second place behind Pretty Perfect before going to the front after three furlongs. Minding moved up alongside her inside the final furlong but she rallied strongly when challenged and won by a head with the pair finishing ten lengths clear of the other eight runners. Keatley commented "It's a dream, really. Miracles happen. She was a cheap purchase and she's done the business." Shane Foley said "She's a tough little filly and the ground came right for her – she ran a blinder at Newmarket but it was too fast for her. Soft ground and a stiff mile was ideal for her".

==== Summer ====
On 13 June Jet Setting was put up for auction at the Goffs London Sale, held at Kensington Palace Orangery and was bought for £1,300,000 by Mike Wallace for the China Horse Club. Commenting on his decision to buy the filly Wallace said "She's a Classic winner. There's very few of them around and her form has stacked up very well. She's a game filly, she's sound and very athletic. Fillies of that quality are highly sought after by anybody. Part of our philosophy is looking for long-term breeding opportunity, she allows us that but she also has potential racing upside".

Four days later she started favourite for the Coronation Stakes at Royal Ascot but after leading for most of the way she faded in closing stages and dead-heated for sixth behind the French-trained Qemah.

==== Autumn ====
After a break of two and a half months Jet Setting returned in the Group One Matron Stakes over one mile at Leopardstown on 10 September. She was in contention for most of the way but weakened towards the finish and came home sixth of the eight runners behind Alice Springs. On 2 October the filly was dropped in class for the Group Three Concorde Stakes at Tipperary Racecourse in which she was matched against male opposition for the first time in 2016. Racing on her favoured soft-to-heavy ground she started the 7/4 favourite ahead of nine opponents including The Happy Prince (Renaissance Stakes), Flight Risk (Gladness Stakes), Sruthan (winner of the race in 2013) and Creggs Pipes (Cairn Rouge Stakes). After racing in second behind Creggs Pipes, Jet Setting took the lead in the straight and pulled away to win "easily" by six and a half lengths. Jet Setting ended her racing career with a run in the Queen Elizabeth II Stakes at Ascot on 15 October. Starting a 25/1 outsider she was among the early leaders but faded in the last quarter mile and finished eleventh of the fourteen runners behind Minding.

=== Retirement ===
In January 2017 it was announced that Jet Setting had been retired from racing to become a broodmare and was scheduled to be covered by Le Havre. Keatley said "I can't complain about losing her. It was a privilege to have her in the first place and I got more out of her than most people get out of any horse in a lifetime".

== Assessment ==
In the 2016 edition of the World's Best Racehorse Rankings Jet Setting was given a rating of 120, making her the 34th best racehorse in the world and the third-best three-year-old filly behind Minding and Songbird.

== Pedigree ==
Pedigree of Jet Setting (IRE), bay mare, 2013
Sire Fast Company (IRE) 2005	Danehill Dancer (IRE); 1993	Danehill	Danzig
Sire Fast Company (IRE) 2005	Danehill Dancer (IRE); 1993	Danehill	Razyana
Sire Fast Company (IRE) 2005	Danehill Dancer (IRE); 1993	Mira Adonde	Sharpen Up
Sire Fast Company (IRE) 2005	Danehill Dancer (IRE); 1993	Mira Adonde	Lettre d'Amour
Sire Fast Company (IRE) 2005	Sheezalady (GB); 1997	Zafonic	Gone West
Sire Fast Company (IRE) 2005	Sheezalady (GB); 1997	Zafonic	Zaizafon
Sire Fast Company (IRE) 2005	Sheezalady (GB); 1997	Canadian Mill	Mill Reef
Sire Fast Company (IRE) 2005	Sheezalady (GB); 1997	Canadian Mill	Par Excellance
Dam Mean Lae (IRE) 2006	Johannesburg (USA); 1999	Hennessy	Storm Cat
Dam Mean Lae (IRE) 2006	Johannesburg (USA); 1999	Hennessy	Island Kitty
Dam Mean Lae (IRE) 2006	Johannesburg (USA); 1999	Myth	Ogygian
Dam Mean Lae (IRE) 2006	Johannesburg (USA); 1999	Myth	Yarn
Dam Mean Lae (IRE) 2006	Plume Rouge (GB); 2000	Pivotal	Polar Falcon
Dam Mean Lae (IRE) 2006	Plume Rouge (GB); 2000	Pivotal	Fearless Revival
Dam Mean Lae (IRE) 2006	Plume Rouge (GB); 2000	Classic Fan	Lear Fan
Dam Mean Lae (IRE) 2006	Plume Rouge (GB); 2000	Classic Fan	Miss Boniface (Family: B3)
