= Prix Minerve =

Flat horse race in France

Prix Lady O’Reilly ( Prix Minerve )
- Class: Group 3
- Location: Deauville Racecourse; Deauville, France
- Inaugurated: 1925
- Race type: Flat / Thoroughbred
- Website: france-galop.com

Race information
- Distance: 2,500 metres (1m 4½f)
- Surface: Turf
- Track: Right-handed
- Qualification: Three-year-old fillies exc. G1 winners this year
- Weight: 55 kg Penalties; 3 kg for Group 2 winners * 2 kg for Group 3 winners * * since January 1
- Purse: €80,000 (2021); 1st: €40,000

Prix Minerve
2025
Indalimos	Consent	Rabbit's Foot

Previous years
2024
Mosaique	Le Combat Continue	Vigatata
2023
Engaliwe	Dschingis Star	Crack Of Light
2022
Eternal Pearl	Queen Trezy	Sea The Sky
2021
Free Wind	Burgarita	Adhafera

2020-2011
2020
Wonderful Tonight	Valia	Paix
2019
Tamniah	Star Terms	Palomba
2018
Worth Waiting	Hermaphrodite	Zarkamiya
2017
God Given	Calayana	Lady Montdore
2016
Golden Valentine	The Juliet Rose	Sotteville
2015
Candarliya	Yaazy	Al Naamah
2014
Zarshana	Game Zone	Mambomiss
2013
Pomology	Artiste Divine	Gosh
2012
Forces Of Darkness	Nobilis	La Conquerante
2011
Shareta	Pacifique	Polygon

2010-2000
2010
Announce	Shamanova	Middle Club
2009
Kalla	Peinture Rare	Pearlescence
2008
Dar Re Mi	Shemima	Alpine Rose
2007
Synopsis	Darsha	Dancing Lady
2006
Maroussies Wings	Mary Louhana	Ponte Tresa
2005
Oiseau Rare	Allexina	Without A Trace
2004
Silverskaya	Reverie Solitaire	Anabaa Republic
2003
Whortleberry	Monetary	Sovana
2002
Tigertail	Trumbaka	Midnight Angel
2001
Lime Gardens	Moon Queen	Light Ballet
2000
Folie Danse	Playact	Flawly

The Prix Minerve is a Group 3 flat horse race in France open to three-year-old thoroughbred fillies. It is run at Deauville over a distance of 2,500 metres (about 1 mile and 4½ furlongs), and it is scheduled to take place each year in August.

== History ==
The event is named after Minerva, the Roman goddess of crafts and wisdom. It was established in 1925, and it was originally called the Prix de Minerve. It was initially staged at Le Tremblay with a distance of 2,000 metres.

The race was abandoned in 1940, and for a period thereafter it was contested over 2,100 metres at Maisons-Laffitte (1941–43) and Auteuil (1944). It returned to Le Tremblay in 1945, and its former distance was restored in 1946. It was held at Longchamp from 1948 to 1950, and on the last two occasions it was run over 2,100 metres.

Le Tremblay closed in 1967, and the Prix de Minerve began a five-year spell at Chantilly the following year. It was transferred to Évry in 1973, and extended to 2,400 metres in 1976. The present version of its title, without the "de", was introduced in 1987.

The Prix Minerve took place at Saint-Cloud in 1993, and for the next three years it continued at Évry. It moved to Deauville in 1997, and at this point it was increased to 2,500 metres. The race was sponsored by Shadwell from 2005 to 2010.

== Records ==
Leading jockey (7 wins):

- Yves Saint-Martin – Red Flame (1963), Flaming Heart (1966), Paulista (1974), Acoma (1976), Rajpoura (1983), Sharaniya (1986), Daralinsha (1987)

Leading trainer (10 wins):

- André Fabre – Colorado Dancer (1989), Wajd (1990), Bright Moon (1993), Isle de France (1998), Prairie Runner (1999), Oiseau Rare (2005), Synopsis (2007), Kalla (2009), Announce (2010), Tamniah (2019)

Leading owner (11 wins):

- HH Aga Khan IV – Flaming Heart (1966), Rajpoura (1983), Sharaniya (1986), Daralinsha (1987), Linnga (1992), Sharamana (1994), Kassana (1997), Oiseau Rare (2005), Shareta (2011), Zarshana (2014), Candarliya (2015)

== Winners since 1979 ==
Year	Winner	Jockey	Trainer	Owner	Time
1979	Anifa	Henri Samani	Mitri Saliba	Mahmoud Fustok
1980	Great Verdict	Henri Samani	Georges Bridgland	Mrs Paul L. Hexter
1981	Anitra's Dance	Freddy Head	Alec Head	Jacques Wertheimer
1982	Perlee	Alfred Gibert	Mitri Saliba	Mahmoud Fustok
1983	Rajpoura	Yves Saint-Martin	Alain de Royer-Dupré	HH Aga Khan IV	2:32.00
1984	Lady Tamara	Henri Samani	Jean-Marie Béguigné	N. A. Souter	2:33.60
1985	Gamberta	Guy Guignard	Georges Mikhalidès	Ibrahim Moubarak	2:32.60
1986	Sharaniya	Yves Saint-Martin	Alain de Royer-Dupré	HH Aga Khan IV	2:32.90
1987	Daralinsha	Yves Saint-Martin	Alain de Royer-Dupré	HH Aga Khan IV	2:33.43
1988	Mystery Rays	Freddy Head	François Boutin	Stavros Niarchos	2:28.83
1989	Colorado Dancer	Cash Asmussen	André Fabre	Sheikh Mohammed	2:29.95
1990	Wajd	Cash Asmussen	André Fabre	Sheikh Mohammed	2:27.46
1991	Lady Blessington	Dominique Boeuf	J. M. de Choubersky	Jeffrey Siegel	2:32.92
1992	Linnga	Guy Guignard	Alain de Royer-Dupré	HH Aga Khan IV	2:30.72
1993	Bright Moon	Thierry Jarnet	André Fabre	Daniel Wildenstein	2:35.60
1994	Sharamana	Gérald Mossé	Alain de Royer-Dupré	HH Aga Khan IV	2:47.29
1995	Danefair	Guy Guignard	Maurice Zilber	Khalid Abdullah	2:40.73
1996	L'Annee Folle	Thierry Gillet	François Doumen	M. Somerset-Leeke	2:28.42
1997	Kassana	Gérald Mossé	Alain de Royer-Dupré	HH Aga Khan IV	2:38.90
1998	Isle de France	Alain Junk	André Fabre	Michael Tabor	2:42.90
1999	Prairie Runner	Olivier Peslier	André Fabre	Daniel Wildenstein	2:42.00
2000	Folie Danse	Davy Bonilla	Yves de Nicolay	Christian Thulliez	2:46.50
2001	Lime Gardens	Eddie Ahern	Michael Grassick	Jim Higgins	2:46.40
2002	Tigertail	Thierry Gillet	Rod Collet	Georges Coude	2:42.60
2003	Whortleberry	Thierry Jarnet	François Rohaut	Jacques Berès	2:43.20
2004	Silverskaya	Ioritz Mendizabal	Jean-Claude Rouget	Earl Champ Gignoux	2:55.90
2005	Oiseau Rare	Christophe Soumillon	André Fabre	HH Aga Khan IV	2:50.60
2006	Maroussies Wings	Olivier Peslier	Patrick Haslam	Renata Jacobs	2:50.00
2007	Synopsis	Stéphane Pasquier	André Fabre	Sheikh Mohammed	2:41.40
2008	Dar Re Mi	Olivier Peslier	John Gosden	Lord Lloyd-Webber	2:50.20
2009	Kalla	Maxime Guyon	André Fabre	Karin von Ullmann	2:43.30
2010	Announce	Maxime Guyon	André Fabre	Khalid Abdullah	2:46.80
2011	Shareta	Christophe Lemaire	Alain de Royer-Dupré	HH Aga Khan IV	2:41.73
2012	Forces of Darkness	Grégory Benoist	Fabrice Vermeulen	G. Augustin-Normand	2:40.70
2013	Pomology	William Buick	John Gosden	Princess Haya of Jordan	2:41.80
2014	Zarshana	Christophe Soumillon	Alain de Royer-Dupré	HH Aga Khan IV	2:49.23
2015	Candarliya	Alexis Badel	Alain de Royer-Dupré	HH Aga Khan IV	2:45.79
2016	Golden Valentine	Aurelien Lemaitre	Freddy Head	LNJ Foxwoods	2:44.70
2017	God Given	Jamie Spencer	Luca Cumani	St Albans Bloodstock	2:43.67
2018	Worth Waiting	Stéphane Pasquier	David Lanigan	Saif Ali	2:43.51
2019	Tamniah	Mickael Barzalona	André Fabre	Prince A. A. Faisal	2:46.94
2020	Wonderful Tonight	Tony Piccone	David Menuisier	Chris Wright	2:54.11
2021	Free Wind	Frankie Dettori	John & Thady Gosden	George Strawbridge	2:46.16
2022	Eternal Pearl	William Buick	Charlie Appleby	Godolphin	2:42.83

== Earlier winners ==
- 1925: Lucide
- 1926: Carissima / Miss McKinley *
- 1927: Bellecour
- 1928: Tanais
- 1929: Kantara
- 1930: La Savoyarde
- 1931: Pearl Cap
- 1932: Broadway Melody / Kiddie *
- 1933: La Souriciere
- 1934: Anatolie
- 1935: Blue Bell
- 1936: Capella
- 1937: Sylvanire
- 1938: Argolide
- 1939: Kaligoussa
- 1940: no race
- 1941: La Barka
- 1942: Gold and Blue
- 1943: Calonice
- 1944: La Belle du Canet
- 1945: Red Sky
- 1946: Pastourelle
- 1947: Love
- 1948: Reine des Etoiles
- 1949: Musette
- 1950: Nuit de Folies
- 1951: Maitrise
- 1952: Abeille
- 1953: Avenida
- 1954: Yvrande
- 1955: Cassilda
- 1956: Sees
- 1957: Great Success
- 1958: Lady Djebel
- 1959: Mandolina
- 1960: Valrose
- 1961: Parbel
- 1962: Peisqueira
- 1963: Red Flame
- 1964: Astaria
- 1965: Irish Lass
- 1966: Flaming Heart
- 1967: Armoricana
- 1968: Valya
- 1969: Insulaire
- 1970: Gleam
- 1971: Cambrizzia
- 1972: Paysanne
- 1973: El Mina
- 1974: Paulista
- 1975: Raise a Baby
- 1976: Acoma
- 1977: Trillion
- 1978: I Will Follow

* The 1926 and 1932 races were dead-heats and have joint winners.

== See also ==
- List of French flat horse races
