= La Cressonniere =

French-bred Thoroughbred racehorse

- Racing silks of Gerard Augustin-Normand
- Sire: Le Havre
- Grandsire: Noverre
- Dam: Absolute Lady
- Damsire: Galileo
- Sex: Mare
- Foaled: 5 April 2013
- Country: France
- Colour: Bay
- Breeder: Franklin Finance
- Owner: Ecurie Antonio Caro & Gerard Augustin-Normand
- Trainer: Jean-Claude Rouget
- Record: 8: 8-0-0
- Earnings: £746,710

Major wins
- Prix Isonomy (2015); Prix Herod (2015); Prix La Camargo (2016); Poule d'Essai des Pouliches (2016); Prix de Diane (2016); Prix de la Nonette (2016)

Awards
- Top-rated French 3-y-o filly (2016)

La Cressonniere (foaled 5 April 2013) is a retired French Thoroughbred racehorse and broodmare. As a two-year-old in 2015 she won all four of her races including the Listed Prix Isonomy and Prix Herod but was not tested at the highest level. After winning another Listed race (the Prix La Camargo) on her three-year-old debut she was stepped up in class and recorded Group 1 victories in the Poule d'Essai des Pouliches and the Prix de Diane. She added a win in the Prix de la Nonette later that year but she then began to suffer from back problems and was retired undefeated in 2017.

== Background ==
La Cressonniere is a dark-coated bay mare bred in France by Franklin Finance. During her racing career she was owned by Ecurie Antonio Caro & Gerard Augustin-Normand and trained by Jean-Claude Rouget. Her name is French for watercress.

She was sired by Le Havre, who won the Prix du Jockey Club in 2009, and whose other foal have included Avenir Certain, Wonderful Tonight and Suedois (Shadwell Turf Mile Stakes). La Cressonniere's dam Absolute Lady showed little racing ability but was a great-great-granddaughter of the influential broodmare Highlight, whose descendants have included Highclere, Nashwan and Deep Impact.

== Racing career ==
=== 2015: two-year-old season ===
La Cressonniere began her racing career in a minor race over 1400 metres at Clairefontaine on 25 July in which she was ridden by Gregory Benoist and won by one and a quarter lengths from Virginie at odds of 5/1. The filly followed up over 1600 metres at Craon two months later, starting at odds of 7/5 and coming home five lengths clear of Twinkly. On 22 October the filly was stepped up in class and matched against male opponents in the Listed Prix Isonomy on heavy ground at Deauville Racecourse. Ridden by Christophe Soumillon she was made the 11/10 favourite and won by three and a half length from Notte Bianca. On her final run of the year La Cressonniere started odds-on favourite for the Prix Herod over 1400 metres at Chantilly Racecourse and won by two and a half lengths from Fourioso with Jet Setting in third.

=== 2016: three-year-old season ===
La Cressonniere was ridden in all four of her races in 2016 by Cristian Demuro. She began her second season in the Listed Prix La Camargo over 1600 metres at Saint-Cloud Racecourse in March and won by two and a half lengths from Qatar Power. On 15 May the filly was stepped up in class on 15 May for the Group 1 Poule d'Essai des Pouliches which was run over 1600 metres at Deauville as Longchamp Racecourse was closed for redevelopment. Qemah started favourite ahead of Alice Springs and Come Alive with La Cressonniere fourth in the betting on 15/2 and the best fancied of the other ten runners being the British challengers Nathra (Nell Gwyn Stakes) and Besharah (Lowther Stakes). After tracking the leaders she went to the front with 400 metres left to travel and stayed on strongly to win "readily" by a length from Nathra with Qemah a head away in third.

In the Prix de Diane over 2100 metres at Chantilly on 19 June La Cressonniere started the 11/4 favourite. Her fifteen opponents included Ballydoyle (Prix Marcel Boussac), Swiss Range (Pretty Polly Stakes), Volta (Prix de Sandringham), Highlands Queen (Prix Cléopâtre), Camprock (Prix Penelope) and The Juliet Rose (Prix de Royaumont). After being restrained at the rear of the field he was switched to the outside to make a strong challenge on the outside in the straight. She gained the advantage entering the last 200 metres and won by half a length from the 50/1 outsider Left Hand. After the race Demuro said "She is incredible. I said to myself at one stage we were too far back, but I know her by heart and I knew she could do it".

After a break of over two months La Cressonniere returned in the Prix de la Nonette over 2000 metres at Deauville in August. starting at odds of 2/9 she recovered from a stumble at the start to take the lead 200 metres out and won "comfortably" by two lengths from Jemayel. The filly was then aimed at the Prix de l'Arc de Triomphe but sustained a back injury in late September which ruled her out for the rest of the season.

In the 2016 World's Best Racehorse Rankings was given a rating of 117, making her the 110th best racehorse in the world and the sixth-best three-year-old filly.

La Cressonniere stayed in training as four-year-old but a recurrence of her back injury forced her into retirement in April 2017.

== Pedigree ==
Pedigree of La Cressonniere (FR), bay mare, 2013
Sire Le Havre (IRE) 2006	Noverre (USA); 1998	Rahy	Blushing Groom (FR)
Sire Le Havre (IRE) 2006	Noverre (USA); 1998	Rahy	Glorious Song (CAN)
Sire Le Havre (IRE) 2006	Noverre (USA); 1998	Danseur Fabuleux	Northern Dancer (CAN)
Sire Le Havre (IRE) 2006	Noverre (USA); 1998	Danseur Fabuleux	Fabuleux Jane
Sire Le Havre (IRE) 2006	Marie Rheinberg (GER); 2002	Surako	Königsstuhl
Sire Le Havre (IRE) 2006	Marie Rheinberg (GER); 2002	Surako	Surata
Sire Le Havre (IRE) 2006	Marie Rheinberg (GER); 2002	Marie d'Argonne (FR)	Jefferson (GB)
Sire Le Havre (IRE) 2006	Marie Rheinberg (GER); 2002	Marie d'Argonne (FR)	Mohair
Dam Absolute Lady (IRE) 2006	Galileo (IRE); 1998	Sadler's Wells (USA)	Northern Dancer (CAN)
Dam Absolute Lady (IRE) 2006	Galileo (IRE); 1998	Sadler's Wells (USA)	Fairy Bridge
Dam Absolute Lady (IRE) 2006	Galileo (IRE); 1998	Urban Sea (USA)	Miswaki
Dam Absolute Lady (IRE) 2006	Galileo (IRE); 1998	Urban Sea (USA)	Allegretta (GB)
Dam Absolute Lady (IRE) 2006	Lil's Jessy (IRE); 1998	Kris (GB)	Sharpen Up
Dam Absolute Lady (IRE) 2006	Lil's Jessy (IRE); 1998	Kris (GB)	Doubly Sure
Dam Absolute Lady (IRE) 2006	Lil's Jessy (IRE); 1998	Lobmille (GB)	Mill Reef (USA)
Dam Absolute Lady (IRE) 2006	Lil's Jessy (IRE); 1998	Lobmille (GB)	Light o' Battle (Family: 2-f)

- La Cressonniere is inbred 4 × 4 to Northern Dancer, meaning that this stallion appears twice in the fourth generation of her pedigree.
