= Prix de la Nonette =

Flat horse race in France

- Class: Group 2
- Location: Deauville Racecourse; Deauville, France
- Inaugurated: 1952
- Race type: Flat / Thoroughbred
- Sponsor: Shadwell
- Website: france-galop.com

Race information
- Distance: 2,000 metres (1¼ miles)
- Surface: Turf
- Track: Right-handed
- Qualification: Three-year-old fillies
- Weight: 57 kg
- Purse: €130,000 (2021); 1st: €74,100

Prix de la Nonette
2022
Trevaunance	Mqse De Sevigne	Agave

Previous years
2021
Rumi	Penja	Rougir

2020-2011
2020
Tawkeel	Tickle Me Green	Alkandora
2019
Terebellum	Mutamakina	Cartiem
2018
Castellar	Rock My Love	My Sister Nat
2017
Sobetsu	Onthemoonagain	Senga
2016
La Cressonniere	Jemayel	Lakalas
2015
Jazzi Top	Holy Moly	Sainte Amarante
2014
Avenir Certain	Crisolles	Lavender Lane
2013
Tasaday	Sparkling Beam	Eleuthera
2012
Romantica	Leaupartie	Trois Lunes
2011
Dream Peace	Epic Love	Haya Landa

2010–2001
2010
Lily Of The Valley	Contredanse	Zagora
2009
Charity Belle	Article Rare	Eclair De Lune
2008
Lady Marian	Treat Gently	Albisola
2007
Tashelka	Diyakalanie	Beatrix Kiddo
2006
Germance	Mysterious Lina	Ballet Pacifica
2005
Viane Rose	Spectrofolle	Cassydora
2004
Grey Lilas	Trinity Joy	Polyfirst
2003
State Of Art	Hoh Buzzard	Felicity
2002
Pearly Shells	Dance Routine	Marotta
2001
Diamilina	Lady Lahar	Spring Oak

2000–1990
2000
Di Moi Oui	Tres Ravi	Reve D'Oscar
1999
Star Of Akkar	Sage Et Jolie	Mother Of Pearl
1998
Zainta	Bayourida	Elanaaka
1997
Dust Dancer	Vereva	Gazelle Royale
1996
Luna Wells	Bint Salsabil	Bint Shadayid
1995
Matiara	Dance Partner	Garden Rose
1994
Grafin	Maidment	Danish
1993
Shemaka	Baya	Talented
1992
River Nymph	Trishyde	Revasser
1991
Caerlina	Magic Night	Pink Turtle
1990
Colour Chart	Spendomania	Cruising Height

The Prix de la Nonette is a Group 2 flat horse race in France open to three-year-old thoroughbred fillies. It is run at Deauville over a distance of 2,000 metres (about 1¼ miles), and it is scheduled to take place each year in August.

== History ==
The event was established in 1952, and it was originally held at Longchamp. It was named after the Nonette, a tributary of the Oise in northern France.

The race was initially contested over 2,200 metres. It was run over 2,400 metres in 1959 and 1960, and shortened to 2,100 metres in 1961.

The Prix de la Nonette was transferred to Deauville and cut to 2,000 metres in 1980. It has continued at this venue with the exception of two periods, 1984–85 and 1989–91, when it took place at Longchamp.

The race was formerly classed at Group 3 level, and it was sponsored by Darley from 2005 to 2010. It was promoted to Group 2 status and backed by Shadwell in 2011.

The Prix de la Nonette sometimes serves as a trial for the following month's Prix Vermeille. The first horse to win both contests was Lezghinka in 1960, and the most recent was Pearly Shells in 2002.

== Records ==
Leading jockey (6 wins):

- Freddy Head – Hecuba (1969), Pistol Packer (1971), Detroit (1980), Fitnah (1985), Grafin (1994), Matiara (1995)
- Gérald Mossé - Karmiska (1987), River Nymph (1992), Shemaka (1993), Zainta (1998), Dream Peace (2011), Rumi (2021)

Leading trainer (8 wins):

- André Fabre – Sierra Roberta (1989), Colour Chart (1990), Luna Wells (1996), Diamilina (2001), Grey Lilas (2004), Tashelka (2007), Romantica (2012), Tasaday (2013)

Leading owner (3 wins):

- HH Aga Khan IV – Sharaya (1983), Shemaka (1993), Zainta (1998)
- Jean-Luc Lagardère – Karmiska (1987), Luna Wells (1996), Diamilina (2001)
- Sheikh Mohammed – Colour Chart (1990), Grafin (1994), Tashelka (2007)

== Winners since 1979 ==
Year	Winner	Jockey	Trainer	Owner	Time
1979	Pitasia	Alfred Gibert	Aage Paus	Sir Douglas Clague
1980	Detroit	Freddy Head	Olivier Douieb	Robert Sangster	2:06.0
1981	Leandra	Alain Lequeux	Pierre Pelat	Baron Thierry van Zuylen
1982	Grease	Gary W. Moore	François Boutin	Josephine Abercrombie
1983	Sharaya	Yves Saint-Martin	Alain de Royer-Dupré	HH Aga Khan IV	2:07.7
1984	Northern Trick	Cash Asmussen	François Boutin	Stavros Niarchos	2:04.3
1985	Fitnah	Freddy Head	Criquette Head	Miss H. Al Maktoum	2:06.2
1986	Galunpe	Alfred Gibert	Bernard Sécly	J. M. Aubry-Dumand	2:15.9
1987	Karmiska	Gérald Mossé	François Boutin	Jean-Luc Lagardère	2:10.9
1988	Animatrice	Gary W. Moore	Criquette Head	Jacques Wertheimer	2:09.5
1989	Sierra Roberta	Cash Asmussen	André Fabre	Paul de Moussac	2:05.6
1990	Colour Chart	Cash Asmussen	André Fabre	Sheikh Mohammed	2:06.8
1991	Caerlina	Éric Legrix	Jean de Roualle	Kaichi Nitta	2:12.7
1992	River Nymph	Gérald Mossé	Jean de Roualle	Mrs Charles Thieriot	2:18.7
1993	Shemaka	Gérald Mossé	Alain de Royer-Dupré	HH Aga Khan IV	2:06.8
1994	Grafin	Freddy Head	François Boutin	Sheikh Mohammed	2:14.9
1995	Matiara	Freddy Head	Criquette Head	Ecurie Aland	2:11.3
1996	Luna Wells ^{[a]}	Thierry Jarnet	André Fabre	Jean-Luc Lagardère	2:10.7
1997	Dust Dancer	Pat Eddery	John Dunlop	Hesmonds Stud	2:13.9
1998	Zainta	Gérald Mossé	Alain de Royer-Dupré	HH Aga Khan IV	2:10.5
1999	Star of Akkar	Thierry Gillet	Jean-Claude Rouget	Marquesa de Moratalla	2:13.7
2000	Di Moi Oui	Thierry Thulliez	Pascal Bary	Grundy Bloodstock Ltd	2:13.1
2001	Diamilina	Olivier Peslier	André Fabre	Jean-Luc Lagardère	2:10.6
2002	Pearly Shells	Christophe Soumillon	François Rohaut	6C Racing Ltd	2:09.3
2003	State of Art	Dominique Boeuf	David Smaga	Baron Thierry van Zuylen	2:09.2
2004	Grey Lilas	Gary Stevens	André Fabre	Gestüt Ammerland	2:29.8
2005	Viane Rose	Ioritz Mendizabal	Jean-Claude Rouget	Antonio Caro	2:11.9
2006	Germance	Ioritz Mendizabal	Jean-Claude Rouget	Nelson Radwan	2:11.2
2007	Tashelka	Stéphane Pasquier	André Fabre	Sheikh Mohammed	2:10.2
2008	Lady Marian	Dominique Boeuf	Werner Baltromei	R'stall Gestüt Hachtsee	2:06.7
2009	Charity Belle	Frankie Dettori	John Gosden	Princess Haya of Jordan	2:07.3
2010	Lily of the Valley	Christophe Soumillon	Jean-Claude Rouget	Bernard Barsi	2:11.8
2011	Dream Peace	Gérald Mossé	Robert Collet	Haras d'Etreham	2:09.7
2012	Romantica	Maxime Guyon	André Fabre	Khalid Abdullah	2:06.2
2013	Tasaday	Maxime Guyon	André Fabre	Godolphin	2:09.9
2014	Avenir Certain	Gregory Benoist	Jean-Claude Rouget	Caro / Augustin-Normand	2:11.18
2015	Jazzi Top	Frankie Dettori	John Gosden	Helena Springfield Ltd	2:12.04
2016	La Cressonniere	Cristian Demuro	Jean-Claude Rouget	Caro / Augustin-Normand	2:11.77
2017	Sobetsu	James Doyle	Charlie Appleby	Godolphin	2:05.94
2018	Castellar	Olivier Peslier	Carlos Laffon-Parias	Sarl Darpat France	2:07.70
2019	Terebellum	Mickael Barzalona	John Gosden	Haya of Jordan	2:10.49
2020	Tawkeel	Cristian Demuro	Jean-Claude Rouget	Hamdan Al Maktoum	2:10.10
2021	Rumi	Gérald Mossé	Carlos Laffon-Parias	Al Shira'aa Farms	2:10.12
2022	Trevaunance	Tony Piccone	Jessica Harrington	Moyglare Stud	2:08.16
2023	Jannah Rose ^{[b]}	Christophe Soumillon	Carlos Laffon-Parias	Al Shira'aa Farms	2:13.18
2024	Friendly Soul ^{[c]}	Kieran Shoemark	John & Thady Gosden	George Strawbridge	2:09.56

^{a} Bint Salsabil and Bint Shadayid finished first and second in 1996, but the race was awarded to the third-placed horse.
^{b} 2023 race run as Prix Alec Head
^{c} 2024 race run as Prix Alec Head

== Earlier winners ==
- 1952: Harbour Grace
- 1953: Gourabe
- 1954: Chimere Fabuleuse
- 1955: Anne
- 1956: Yasmin
- 1957: Denisy
- 1958: Djelouba
- 1959: Matchiche
- 1960: Lezghinka
- 1961: La Bergerette
- 1962: Salinas
- 1963: Royal Girl
- 1964:
- 1965: Tinganeve
- 1966: Bubunia
- 1967: Silver Cloud
- 1968: Pola Bella
- 1969: Hecuba
- 1970: Popkins
- 1971: Pistol Packer
- 1972: Rescousse
- 1973: Gay Style
- 1974: Paulista
- 1975: Ivanjica
- 1976: Theia
- 1977: Kamicia
- 1978: Tempus Fugit

== See also ==
- List of French flat horse races
