= Duke of Cambridge Stakes =

Flat horse race in Britain

- Class: Group 2
- Location: Ascot Racecourse; Ascot, England
- Inaugurated: 2004
- Race type: Flat / Thoroughbred
- Website: Ascot

Race information
- Distance: 1 mile (1,609 metres)
- Surface: Turf
- Track: Straight
- Qualification: Four-years-old and up fillies & mares
- Weight: 9 st 2 lb Penalties; 5 lb for Group 1 winners * 3 lb for Group 2 winners * * since 31 August last year
- Purse: £175,000 (2022); 1st: £103,600

Duke Of Cambridge Stakes
2026
Blue Bolt	Jancis	Friendly Soul

Previous years
2025
Crimson Advocate	Cinderella's Dream	Fallen Angel
2024
Running Lion	Laurel	Doom
2023
Rogue Millennium	Random Harvest	Prosperous Voyage
2022
Saffron Beach	Thunder Beauty	Primo Bacio
2021
Indie Angel	Lady Bowthorpe	Queen Power

2020-2011
2020
Nazeef	Agincourt	Queen Power
2019
Move Swiftly	Rawdaa	I Can Fly
2018
Aljazzi	Tribute Act	Wilamina
2017
Qemah	Aljazzi	Usherette
2016
Usherette	Furia Cruzada	Always Smile
2015
Amazing Maria	Rizeena	Cladocera
2014
Integral	L'amour De Ma Vie	Purr Along
2013
Duntle	Ladys First	Dank
2012
Joviality	Chachamaidee	Lay Time
2011
Lolly For Dolly	Chachamaidee	First City

2010-2004
2010
Strawberrydaiquiri	Spacious	Antara
2009
Spacious	Heaven Sent	Eva's Request
2008
Sabana Perdida	Heaven Sent	Grecian Dancer
2007
Nannina	Satwa Queen	Sabana Perdida
2006
Soviet Song	Echelon	Royal Alchemist
2005
Peeress	Sundrop	Soviet Song
2004
Favourable Terms	Monturani	Soldera

The Duke of Cambridge Stakes is a Group 2 flat horse race in Great Britain open to fillies and mares aged four years or older. It is run at Ascot over a distance of 1 mile (1,609 metres), and it is scheduled to take place each year in June.

The race is one of several for older fillies which were introduced across Europe in 2004. These were designed as an incentive to keep more of their gender from being exported or prematurely retired to stud. It was originally titled the Windsor Forest Stakes, and was renamed the Duke of Cambridge Stakes in 2013 in honour of Prince William, Duke of Cambridge.

The Duke of Cambridge Stakes is now contested on the second day of the five-day Royal Ascot meeting.

== Records ==
Most successful horse:

- no horse has won this race more than once

Leading jockey (3 wins):

- William Buick - Joviality (2012), Aljazzi (2018), Saffron Beach (2022)

Leading trainer (6 wins): (includes jointly-trained winners)

- John Gosden - Nannina (2007), Joviality (2012), Nazeef (2020), Indie Angel (2021), Running Lion (2024), Crimson Advocate (2025)

== Winners ==
Year	Winner	Age	Jockey	Trainer	Time
2004	Favourable Terms	4	Kieren Fallon	Sir Michael Stoute	1:40.37
2005 (Note: The 2005 running took place at York)	Peeress	4	Michael Kinane	Sir Michael Stoute	1:37.42
2006	Soviet Song	6	Jamie Spencer	James Fanshawe	1:40.67
2007	Nannina	4	Jimmy Fortune	John Gosden	1:40.97
2008	Sabana Perdida	5	Christophe Lemaire	Alain de Royer-Dupré	1:39.73
2009	Spacious	4	Johnny Murtagh	James Fanshawe	1:41.07
2010	Strawberrydaiquiri	4	Ryan Moore	Sir Michael Stoute	1:38.04
2011	Lolly for Dolly	4	Wayne Lordan	Tommy Stack	1:38.72
2012	Joviality	4	William Buick	John Gosden	1:38.37
2013	Duntle	4	Wayne Lordan	David Wachman	1:39.47
2014	Integral	4	Ryan Moore	Sir Michael Stoute	1:37.09
2015	Amazing Maria	4	James Doyle	David O'Meara	1:42.60
2016	Usherette	4	Mickael Barzalona	André Fabre	1:43.33
2017	Qemah	4	Grégory Benoist	Jean-Claude Rouget	1:38.34
2018	Aljazzi	5	William Buick	Marco Botti	1:40.53
2019	Move Swiftly	4	Daniel Tudhope	William Haggas	1:42.63
2020	Nazeef	4	Jim Crowley	John Gosden	1:40.57
2021	Indie Angel	4	Frankie Dettori	John & Thady Gosden	1:39.92
2022	Saffron Beach	4	William Buick	Jane Chapple-Hyam	1:39.99
2023	Rogue Millennium	4	Daniel Tudhope	Tom Clover	1:41.33
2024	Running Lion	4	Oisin Murphy	John & Thady Gosden	1:39.12
2025	Crimson Advocate	4	James McDonald	John & Thady Gosden	1:38.60
2026	Blue Bolt	4	Colin Keane	Andrew Balding	1:39:07

== See also ==
- Horse racing in Great Britain
- List of British flat horse races
