= Qemah =

Irish-bred Thoroughbred racehorse

- Sire: Danehill Dancer
- Grandsire: Danehill
- Dam: Kartica
- Damsire: Rainbow Quest
- Sex: Mare
- Foaled: 19 February 2013
- Country: Ireland
- Colour: Bay
- Breeder: Ecurie Cadran
- Owner: Al Shaqab Racing
- Trainer: Jean-Claude Rouget
- Record: 13: 5-2-3
- Earnings: £638,083

Major wins
- Prix de la Grotte (2016); Coronation Stakes (2016); Prix Rothschild (2016); Duke of Cambridge Stakes (2017)

Qemah (foaled 19 February 2013) is an Irish-bred, French-trained Thoroughbred racehorse and broodmare. She showed considerable promise as a juvenile in 2015 when she won one minor race and finished third in the Prix Marcel Boussac. The following spring, she took the Prix de la Grotte and went on to record Group 1 victories in the Coronation Stakes and Prix Rothschild. The highlight of her four-year-old season was a win in the Duke of Cambridge Stakes.

== Background ==
Qemah is a bay mare with a white star bred in Ireland by Ecurie Cadran. In August 2014, as a yearling, she was offered for sale at Deauville and bought for €200,000 by the bloodstock agency Mandore International. She was subsequently passed into the ownership of Al Shaqab Racing and sent into training in France with Jean-Claude Rouget. She was ridden in most of her races by Gregory Benoist.

She was sired by Danehill Dancer, who won the Phoenix Stakes, National Stakes and Greenham Stakes before becoming a very successful breeding stallion. His other progeny have included Choisir, Mastercraftsman and Dancing Rain. Qemah's dam Kartica showed some racing ability, winning one minor race and finishing third in the Group 3 Prix Fille de l'Air. Kartica's dam Cayman Sunset won the Dahlia Stakes and as a descendant of the broodmare Adjournment, was distantly related to Master Derby.

== Racing career ==
=== 2015: two-year-old season ===
Qemah made her debut in a contest for previously unraced fillies over 1500 metres at Deauville Racecourse on 7 August in which she started 2/1 favourite and finished second, six and a half lengths behind the winner Antonoe. Four weeks later, ridden by Ioritz Mendizabal, she started favourite for the Prix de la Sorbonne over 1700 metres at Longchamp Racecourse and recorded her first success as she won "easily" by three lengths from Doha Dream. On 4 October, the filly was moved up sharply in class to contest the Group 1 Prix Marcel Boussac over 1600 metres at Longchamp and finished strongly to take third place behind Ballydoyle and Turret Rocks.

=== 2016: three-year-old season ===
In the Group 3 Prix de la Grotte over 1600 metres at Chantilly Racecourse on 20 April, Qemah started the 4/1 third choice in the betting behind Trixia (winner of the Prix des Réservoirs) and Antonoe. After racing in mid-division she accelerated into the lead 200 metres out and won "comfortably" by two and a half lengths from Kenriya. Qemah started favourite in the Poule d'Essai des Pouliches at Deauville on 15 May but after stumbling early in the race she came home third behind La Cressonniere and Nathra. On 17 June the filly was sent to England for the Coronation Stakes over one mile at Royal Ascot and started at odds of 6/1 in a thirteen-runner field. Jet Setting started favourite, while the other runners included Alice Springs, Nathra, Nemoralia (Michael Seely Memorial Stakes), Besharah (Lowther Stakes), Fireglow (Montrose Stakes) and Now Or Later (Derrinstown Stud 1,000 Guineas Trial). After being restrained by Benoist in the early stages, she began to make rapid progress on the outside in the straight, took the lead just inside the final furlong, and won by one and three quarter lengths and a short head from Nemoralia and Alice Springs.

Qemah was matched against older fillies and mares in the Prix Rothschild over 1600 metres at Deauville on 31 July and started second favourite behind Alice Springs who had won the Falmouth Stakes since her defeat at Ascot. The other eight runners included Esoterique, Amazing Maria and Lumiere. Qemah settled in mid-division, went to the front 300 metres from the finish and kept on well to win by one and a quarter lengths from Volta. On 10 September the filly attempted to win her third consecutive Group 1 race when she was sent to Ireland for the Matron Stakes at Leopardstown Racecourse but was beaten into third behind Alice Springs and Persuasive.

In the 2016 World's Best Racehorse Rankings Qemah was given a rating of 116, making her the 158th best racehorse in the world.

=== 2017: four-year-old season ===
Qemah began her second season in the Chartwell Fillies' Stakes at Lingfield Park in May in which she started favourite but finished second to Mix and Mingle after being hampered two furlongs out. On 21 June, she returned to Royal Ascot for the Group 2 Duke of Cambridge and was made the 5/2 favourite ahead of thirteen opponents including Usherette (winner of the race in 2016), Mix and Mingle, Turret Rocks, Smart Call (from South Africa) and Greta G (from Argentina). Racing up the stands-side of the course (the left-hand side from the jockeys' viewpoint) she took the lead approaching the final furlong and was "driven out" by Benoist to win by three quarters of a length from the 40/1 outsider Aljazzi with Usherette a neck away of third.

On 30 July Qemah started favourite as she attempted to repeat her 2016 success in the Prix Rothschild, but finished fourth in a "blanket finish", beaten half a length by the winner Roly Poly. At Leopardstown in September she came home fifth in a strongly-contested edition of the Matron Stakes behind Hydrangea, Winter, Persuasive and Wuheida, with Roly Poly, Rhododendron and Intricately finishing behind. On her final racecourse appearance she finished sixth of the thirteen runners behind Roly Poly in the Sun Chariot Stakes at Newmarket Racecourse on 7 October.

== Pedigree ==
Pedigree of Qemah (IRE), bay mare, 2013
Sire Danehill Dancer (IRE) 1993	Danehill (USA); 1986	Danzig	Northern Dancer
Sire Danehill Dancer (IRE) 1993	Danehill (USA); 1986	Danzig	Pas de Nom
Sire Danehill Dancer (IRE) 1993	Danehill (USA); 1986	Razyana	His Majesty
Sire Danehill Dancer (IRE) 1993	Danehill (USA); 1986	Razyana	Spring Adieu
Sire Danehill Dancer (IRE) 1993	Mira Adonde (USA); 1986	Sharpen Up	Atan
Sire Danehill Dancer (IRE) 1993	Mira Adonde (USA); 1986	Sharpen Up	Rocchetta
Sire Danehill Dancer (IRE) 1993	Mira Adonde (USA); 1986	Lettre d'Amour	Caro
Sire Danehill Dancer (IRE) 1993	Mira Adonde (USA); 1986	Lettre d'Amour	Lianga
Dam Kartica (GB) 2003	Rainbow Quest (USA); 1995	Blushing Groom	Red God
Dam Kartica (GB) 2003	Rainbow Quest (USA); 1995	Blushing Groom	Runaway Bride
Dam Kartica (GB) 2003	Rainbow Quest (USA); 1995	I Will Follow	Herbager
Dam Kartica (GB) 2003	Rainbow Quest (USA); 1995	I Will Follow	Where You Lead
Dam Kartica (GB) 2003	Cayman Sunset (IRE); 1997	Night Shift	Northern Dancer
Dam Kartica (GB) 2003	Cayman Sunset (IRE); 1997	Night Shift	Ciboulette
Dam Kartica (GB) 2003	Cayman Sunset (IRE); 1997	Robinia	Roberto
Dam Kartica (GB) 2003	Cayman Sunset (IRE); 1997	Robinia	Royal Graustark (Family 1-l)

- Qemah was inbred 4 × 4 to Northern Dancer, meaning that this stallion appears twice in the fourth generation of her pedigree.
