= Prix Rothschild =

Flat horse race in France

- Class: Group 1
- Location: Deauville Racecourse; Deauville, France
- Inaugurated: 1929
- Race type: Flat / Thoroughbred
- Website: france-galop.com

Race information
- Distance: 1,600 metres (1 mile)
- Surface: Turf
- Track: Straight
- Qualification: Three-years-old and up fillies & mares
- Weight: 55 kg (3yo); 58½ kg (4yo+)
- Purse: €300,000 (2022); 1st: €171,420

Prix Rothschild
2026
Blue Bolt	Precise	Moon Target

Previous years
2025
Fallen Angel	January	Start Of Day
2024
Mqse De Sevigne	Excellent Truth	Rogue Millennium
2023
Mqse De Sevigne	Life In Motion	Sauterne
2022
Saffron Beach	Tenebrism	Goldistyle
2021
Mother Earth	Sagamiyra	Speak Of The Devil

2020-2011
2020
Watch Me	Half Light	Know It All
2019
Laurens	With You	Obligate
2018
With You	Crown Walk	Rosa Imperial
2017
Roly Poly	Via Ravenna	Siyoushake
2016
Qemah	Volta	Steip Amach
2015
Amazing Maria	Ervedya	Bawina
2014
Esoterique	Miss France	Integral
2013
Elusive Kate	Duntle	Kenhope
2012
Elusive Kate	Golden Lilac	Mashoora
2011
Goldikova	Sahpresa	Timepiece

2010–2001
2010
Goldikova	Music Show	Elusive Wave
2009
Goldikova	Elusive Wave	Proviso
2008
Goldikova	Darjina	Natagora
2007
Darjina	Missvinski	Simply Perfect
2006
Mandesha	Impressionnante	Tie Black
2005
Divine Proportions	Shapira	Gorella
2004
Marbye	Majestic Desert	Nebraska Tornado
2003
Bright Sky	Six Perfections	Marbye
2002
Turtle Bow	Dedication	Proudwings
2001
Ascension	Just Special	Saying Grace

2000–1990
2000
Lady Of Chad	Danzigaway	Iftiraas
1999
Field Of Hope	Miss Berbere	Presumed
1998
Miss Berbere	Fizzed	Khumba Mela
1997
Daneskaya	Rebecca Sharp	Supercal
1996
Shaanxi	Zarannda	Housa Dancer
1995
Smolensk	Shaanxi	Agathe
1994
Hatoof	Ski Paradise	Lunafairy
1993
Ski Paradise	Fresher	Elizabeth Bay
1992
Hydro Calido	Marble Maiden	Euphonic
1991
Leariva	Crystal Path	Once In My Life
1990
Lady Winner	Daisy Dance	Catherine Parr

The Prix Rothschild is a Group 1 flat horse race in France open to thoroughbred fillies and mares aged three years or older. It is run at Deauville over a distance of 1,600 metres (about 1 mile), and it is scheduled to take place each year in late July or early August.

== History ==
The event was established in 1929, and it was originally called the Prix d'Astarté. It was named after Astarte, a goddess of fertility.

Deauville Racecourse was closed during World War II, and the Prix d'Astarté was not run in 1940. For the remainder of this period it was switched between Longchamp (1941–42, 1944–45) and Le Tremblay (1943).

The present system of race grading was introduced in 1971, and the Prix d'Astarté was initially given Group 3 status. It was promoted to Group 2 level in 1982, and to Group 1 in 2004.

The race was renamed the Prix Rothschild in 2008. This was in memory of Guy de Rothschild (1909–2007), a prominent owner-breeder, and it was an acknowledgement of his family's contribution to French racing.

== Records ==
Most successful horse (4 wins):

- Goldikova – 2008, 2009, 2010, 2011

Leading jockey (6 wins):

- Freddy Head – Carabella (1967), Prudent Miss (1970), Thorough (1982), Northern Aspen (1985), Navratilovna (1989), Hydro Calido (1992)
- Olivier Peslier – Shaanxi (1996), Goldikova (2008, 2009, 2010, 2011), Amazing Maria (2015)

Leading trainer (5 wins):

- John Cunnington Sr. – Otero (1945), Procureuse (1947), Balle Negre (1948), Action (1968), Princess Arjumand (1973)
- François Mathet – Lilya (1958), Breloque (1960), Tin Top (1961), Tamoure (1965), Kirmiz (1972)
- David Smaga – Thorough (1982), Elle Seule (1986), Navratilovna (1989), Leariva (1991), Miss Berbere (1998)
- André Fabre – Nashmeel (1987), Ski Paradise (1993), Smolensk (1995), Daneskaya (1997), Esoterique (2014)
- Freddy Head – Goldikova (2008, 2009, 2010, 2011), With You (2018)

Leading owner (4 wins):

- Teruya Yoshida – Shaanxi (1996), Lady of Chad (2000), Marbye (2004), Elusive Kate (2012)
- Wertheimer et Frère – Goldikova (2008, 2009, 2010, 2011)

== Winners since 1980 ==
Year	Winner	Age	Jockey	Trainer	Owner	Time
1980	Moon Ingraver	3	Gianfranco Dettori	Lorenzo Brogi	Razza Spineta	1:42.6
1981	Epsiba	4	Jean-Claude Desaint	Henri van de Poele	Cathy Franco	1:35.2
1982	Thorough	4	Freddy Head	David Smaga	Alan Clore	1:34.3
1983	Luth Enchantee	3	Maurice Philipperon	John Cunnington Jr.	Paul de Moussac	1:35.9
1984	Meis El-Reem	3	Alain Lequeux	Olivier Douieb	Bechara Choucair	1:36.3
1985	Northern Aspen	3	Freddy Head	Olivier Douieb	Allen Paulson	1:40.0
1986	Elle Seule	3	Alain Lequeux	David Smaga	David Smaga	1:37.4
1987	Nashmeel	3	Pat Eddery	André Fabre	Khalid Abdullah	1:37.1
1988	Gabina	3	Éric Legrix	J. C. Cunnington	Countess Batthyany	1:39.1
1989	Navratilovna	3	Freddy Head	David Smaga	Ignacio Correas	1:38.0
1990	Lady Winner	4	Éric Legrix	Maurice Zilber	Ecurie I. M. Fares	1:36.1
1991	Leariva	4	Alain Lequeux	David Smaga	Baron Thierry van Zuylen	1:37.2
1992	Hydro Calido	3	Freddy Head	François Boutin	Stavros Niarchos	1:35.8
1993	Ski Paradise	3	Sylvain Guillot	André Fabre	Zenya Yoshida	1:39.4
1994	Hatoof	5	Walter Swinburn	Criquette Head	Maktoum Al Maktoum	1:36.8
1995	Smolensk	3	Thierry Jarnet	André Fabre	Mrs Paul de Moussac	1:35.6
1996	Shaanxi	4	Olivier Peslier	Élie Lellouche	Teruya Yoshida	1:39.1
1997	Daneskaya	4	Alain Junk	André Fabre	Philip Lau Sak-Hong	1:39.4
1998	Miss Berbere	3	Dominique Boeuf	David Smaga	Ecurie Seutet	1:39.7
1999	Field of Hope	4	Sylvain Guillot	Pascal Bary	Grundy Bloodstock Ltd
2000	Lady of Chad	3	Yutaka Take	Richard Gibson	Teruya Yoshida	1:38.9
2001	Ascension	3	Gérald Mossé	Mick Channon	Norman Cheng	1:41.6
2002	Turtle Bow	3	Christophe Soumillon	François Rohaut	Andrew Crichton	1:40.5
2003	Bright Sky	4	Dominique Boeuf	Élie Lellouche	Ecurie Wildenstein	1:37.4
2004	Marbye	4	Mirco Demuro	Bruno Grizzetti	Teruya Yoshida	1:36.7
2005	Divine Proportions	3	Christophe Lemaire	Pascal Bary	Niarchos Family	1:39.9
2006	Mandesha	3	Christophe Soumillon	Alain de Royer-Dupré	Zahra Aga Khan	1:36.4
2007	Darjina	3	Thierry Thulliez	Alain de Royer-Dupré	Zahra Aga Khan	1:37.1
2008	Goldikova	3	Olivier Peslier	Freddy Head	Wertheimer et Frère	1:37.5
2009	Goldikova	4	Olivier Peslier	Freddy Head	Wertheimer et Frère	1:35.7
2010	Goldikova	5	Olivier Peslier	Freddy Head	Wertheimer et Frère	1:37.5
2011	Goldikova	6	Olivier Peslier	Freddy Head	Wertheimer et Frère	1:34.3
2012	Elusive Kate	3	William Buick	John Gosden	Teruya Yoshida	1:37.4
2013	Elusive Kate	4	William Buick	John Gosden	Teruya Yoshida	1:35.2
2014	Esoterique	4	Pierre-Charles Boudot	André Fabre	Édouard de Rothschild	1:37.86
2015	Amazing Maria	4	Olivier Peslier	David O'Meara	Sir Robert Ogden	1:34.72
2016	Qemah	3	Grégory Benoist	Jean-Claude Rouget	Al Shaqab Racing	1:38.09
2017	Roly Poly	3	Ryan Moore	Aidan O'Brien	Tabor / Smith / Magnier	1:36.45
2018	With You	3	Aurelien Lemaitre	Freddy Head	George W. Strawbridge Jr.	1:36.52
2019	Laurens	4	P. J. McDonald	Karl Burke	John Dance	1:36.71
2020	Watch Me	4	Pierre-Charles Boudot	Francis-Henri Graffard	Tamagni-Bodmer / Vannod	1:34.05
2021	Mother Earth	3	Ryan Moore	Aidan O'Brien	Tabor / Smith / Magnier	1:35.81
2022	Saffron Beach	4	William Buick	Jane Chapple-Hyam	Lucy Sangster, James Wigan, Ollie Sangster	1:36.45
2023	Mqse De Sevigne	4	Alexis Pouchin	André Fabre	Baron Édouard de Rothschild	1:35.50
2024	Mqse De Sevigne	5	Alexis Pouchin	André Fabre	Baron Édouard de Rothschild	1:35.25
2025	Fallen Angel	4	Daniel Tudhope	Karl Burke	Wathnan Racing	1:35.10
2026	Blue Bolt	4	Colin Keane	Andrew Balding	Juddmonte	1:35.73

== Earlier winners ==
- 1929: Tivoli
- 1930: Starlight
- 1931: Celerina
- 1932: Confidence
- 1933: Arpette
- 1934: Eleda
- 1935: Rarity
- 1936: Pamina
- 1937: Aziyade
- 1938: Tonnelle
- 1939: Dixiana
- 1940: no race
- 1941: Thread
- 1942: Picture
- 1943: Thiorba
- 1944: Laelia
- 1945: Otero
- 1946: Salamis
- 1947: Procureuse
- 1948: Balle Negre
- 1949:
- 1950: Fontaine
- 1951: Marcalla
- 1952:
- 1953: Dynastie
- 1954:
- 1955: Tanina
- 1956: Djanet
- 1957: Careless Love
- 1958: Lilya
- 1959: Begrolles
- 1960: Breloque
- 1961: Tin Top
- 1962:
- 1963: Mona Louise
- 1964: Palinda
- 1965: Tamoure
- 1966: Cover Girl
- 1967: Carabella
- 1968: Action
- 1969: Zelinda
- 1970: Prudent Miss
- 1971: Madame's Share
- 1972: Kirmiz
- 1973: Princess Arjumand
- 1974: Gay Style
- 1975: Infra Green
- 1976: Carolina Moon
- 1977: Sanedtki
- 1978: Clear Picture
- 1979: Topsy

== See also ==
- List of French flat horse races
- Recurring sporting events established in 1929 – this race is included under its original title, Prix d'Astarté.
