= Le Havre (horse) =

Irish-bred Thoroughbred racehorse

- Sire: Noverre
- Grandsire: Rahy
- Dam: Marie Rheinberg
- Damsire: Surako
- Sex: Stallion
- Foaled: 4 February 2006
- Died: 3 March 2022 (aged 16)
- Country: Ireland
- Colour: Brown or Black
- Breeder: Team Hogdala A B
- Owner: Gerard Augustin-Normand
- Trainer: Jean-Claude Rouget
- Record: 6: 4-1-0
- Earnings: £968,200

Major wins
- Prix Djebel (2009); Prix du Jockey Club (2009)

Le Havre (4 February 2006 – 3 March 2022) was an Irish-bred, French-trained Thoroughbred racehorse and sire. Bred in Ireland by his French-based breeders he was bought for €100,000 as a yearling and trained in the South-West of France by Jean-Claude Rouget. As a two-year-old, he showed promise in winning his first two races but finished unplaced when favourite for the Critérium International. He began his second season with an upset win over the favoured Naaqoos in the Prix Djebel and then finished second in the Poule d'Essai des Poulains before recording his biggest win in the Prix du Jockey Club. In the latter race, he sustained serious injuries which led to his retirement shortly afterwards. As a breeding stallion, he made an immediate impact, siring several major winners.

== Background ==
Le Havre was a brown or black horse with a white coronet on his left hind foot, bred in Ireland by the Team Hogdala. The Hogdala team, based at the Haras de Coulonces is made up of Jan and Maja Sundstrom and their daughter Anna Drion: he was described by Drion as a "beautiful" foal. Le Havre was sired by Noverre, a top-class miler who won the Sussex Stakes in 2001 and finished second or third in ten other Group One races. As a breeding stallion, his other good winners included Music Show (winner of the Falmouth Stakes), I'm A Dreamer (Beverly D. Stakes), Miss Lucifer (Challenge Stakes), Summit Surge (York Stakes) and Enora (Preis der Diana). Le Havre's dam, the German mare Marie Rheinberg, was an unraced half-sister to the leading racehorse and sire Polar Falcon. As a descendant of the broodmare Barley Corn, Marie Rheinberg was distantly related to the Prix de l'Arc de Triomphe winner Sassafras.

As a yearling, Le Havre was consigned by the Haras de Coulonces to the Arqana sale at Deauville in August 2007, where he was bought for €100,000 by the French trainer Jean-Claude Rouget acting on behalf of Gerard Augustin-Normand. Augustin-Normand later said that the colt "winked at him from the sales ring" and named him after his home town. During his racing career the colt was trained by Rouget at his stable near Pau, Pyrénées-Atlantiques, and was ridden in all but one of his races by Christophe Lemaire.

== Racing career ==
=== 2008: two-year-old season ===
Le Havre made his racecourse debut at Deauville-Clairefontaine Racecourse on 30 August when he won the Prix de la Ville de Liseux over 1600 metres, beating Surdoue by three quarters of a length. Five weeks later the colt faced eight opponents in the Prix Nino over the same distance at Saint-Cloud Racecourse. He won by two lengths from the André Fabre-trained Feels All Right with a gap of three lengths back to Varenar (later to win the Prix de la Forêt) in third place. The colt was then moved up sharply in class to contest the Group One Critérium International over the same course and distance on 2 November in which he was ridden by Ioritz Mendizabal and started 5/2 favourite in an eleven-runner field. He raced in mid-division before making progress on the outside in the straight but never looked likely to win and finished seventh behind the British-trained colt Zafisio.

=== 2009: three-year-old season ===
On his first appearance as a three-year-old, Le Havre ran in the Listed Prix Djebel over 1400 metres at Maisons-Laffitte Racecourse on 10 April. Most of the attention for the race was focused on the Freddy Head-trained favourite Naaqoos, who had won the Prix Jean-Luc Lagardère and was regarded as a leading fancy for the 2000 Guineas. Lemaire on Le Havre tracked Davy Bonilla on Naaqooa before moving up to challenge the leader 200 metres from the finish. He gained the advantage in the last 100 metres and won by a head at odds of 4/1. On 10 May Le Havre contested the Poule d'Essai des Poulains over 1600 metres at Longchamp Racecourse and started the 7.5/1 fifth choice in the betting behind Super Pistachio (Champagne Stakes), Naaqoos, Vocalised (Greenham Stakes, Tetrarch Stakes) and Silver Frost (Prix de Cabourg, Prix Thomas Bryon, Prix Omnium II, Prix de Fontainebleau). Le Havre raced towards the middle of the eleven-runner field and turned into the straight in fifth place. He made steady progress in the closing stages to take second place, two lengths behind Silver Frost and just ahead of Naaqoos and Super Pistachio.

Le Havre was one of seventeen colts to contest the 172nd running of the Prix du Jockey Club over 2100 metres at Chantilly Racecourse on 7 June. Silver Frost started favourite ahead of Carthage (Prix de l'Avre), Super Pistachio, and Feels All Right with Le Havre starting at odds of 11.9/1. The other runners included Zafisio and the Prix Hocquart winner Wajir and the Criquette Head-trained Fuisse. Le Havre was not among the early leaders and turned into the straight in seventh place, positioned close to the inside rail before Lemaire switched him to the outside approaching the last 400 metres. The colt took second place 300 metres out, overtook the leader Fuisse 150 metres from the finish, and won by one and half lengths. Super Pistachio took third place ahead of Carthage and the 40/1 outsider Calvados Blues. After the race, Rouget said "I didn't know if the horse would stay ten furlongs as his pedigree is very fast, and because I wasn't sure, I wasn't overly confident". The reclusive Augustin-Normand watched the race at home on television.

Le Havre sustained serious tendon injuries in the Prix de Jockey Club and his retirement was announced four weeks later. Le Havre died on 3 March 2022, at the age of 16.

== Stud record ==
Le Havre was retired from racing to become a breeding stallion at the Haras De La Cauviniere at Notre-Dame-de-Courson in Lower Normandy. In his first season at stud he sired the filly Avenir Certain who won the Poule d'Essai des Pouliches and the Prix de Diane. Another Group 1 winning filly, Splash Back, was victorious in the Tattersall's Tiara. Amongst his other winners are Game Nation 47 -65 Handicap (Div ii) at Galway, Auvray (Prix de Lutèce, Prix Chaudenay), Queen Bee (Prix du Calvados), La Cressonniere and Villa Marina.

== Pedigree ==
Pedigree of Le Havre (IRE), brown or black stallion 2006
Sire Noverre (USA) 1998	Rahy (USA); 1985	Blushing Groom	Red God
Sire Noverre (USA) 1998	Rahy (USA); 1985	Blushing Groom	Runaway Bride
Sire Noverre (USA) 1998	Rahy (USA); 1985	Glorious Song	Halo
Sire Noverre (USA) 1998	Rahy (USA); 1985	Glorious Song	Ballade
Sire Noverre (USA) 1998	Danseur Fabuleux (USA); 1982	Northern Dancer	Nearctic
Sire Noverre (USA) 1998	Danseur Fabuleux (USA); 1982	Northern Dancer	Natalma
Sire Noverre (USA) 1998	Danseur Fabuleux (USA); 1982	Fabuleux Jane	Le Fabuleux
Sire Noverre (USA) 1998	Danseur Fabuleux (USA); 1982	Fabuleux Jane	Native Partner
Dam Marie Rheinberg (GER) 2002	Surako (GER); 1993	Königsstuhl	Dschingis Khan
Dam Marie Rheinberg (GER) 2002	Surako (GER); 1993	Königsstuhl	Königskrönung
Dam Marie Rheinberg (GER) 2002	Surako (GER); 1993	Surata	Lagunas
Dam Marie Rheinberg (GER) 2002	Surako (GER); 1993	Surata	Surama
Dam Marie Rheinberg (GER) 2002	Marie d'Argonne (FR); 1981	Jefferson	Charlottesville
Dam Marie Rheinberg (GER) 2002	Marie d'Argonne (FR); 1981	Jefferson	Monticella
Dam Marie Rheinberg (GER) 2002	Marie d'Argonne (FR); 1981	Mohair	Blue Tom
Dam Marie Rheinberg (GER) 2002	Marie d'Argonne (FR); 1981	Mohair	Imberline (Family: 8-c)
