= Avenir Certain =

French-bred Thoroughbred racehorse

- Racing silks of Antonio Caro and Gerard Augustin-Normand
- Sire: Le Havre
- Grandsire: Noverre
- Dam: Puggy
- Damsire: Mark of Esteem
- Sex: Filly
- Foaled: 30 April 2011
- Country: France
- Colour: Bay
- Breeder: Elisabeth Vidal
- Owner: Antonio Caro; Gerard Augustin-Normand
- Trainer: Jean-Claude Rouget
- Jockey: Jean-Bernard Eyquem; Maxime Guyon; Gregory Benoist
- Record: 7: 6–0–0

Major wins
- Poule d'Essai des Pouliches (2014); Prix de Diane (2014); Prix de la Nonette (2014)

Avenir Certain (foaled 30 April 2011) is a French Thoroughbred racehorse who was unbeaten until racing in the 2014 Prix de l'Arc de Triomphe. She only raced twice as a two-year-old, and after winning one minor race in 2014, she won the Group 1 Poule d'Essai des Pouliches and Prix de Diane and the Group 2 Prix de la Nonette. She is trained by Jean-Claude Rouget and owned by Antonio Caro and Gerard Augustin-Normand.

== Background ==
Avenir Certain is a bay filly bred by Elisabeth Vidal and foaled on 30 April 2011. She was sired by Le Havre, who won the Prix du Jockey Club in 2009, and is now a stallion at Haras de la Cauviniere. Her dam is Puggy, a daughter of Mark of Esteem. Puggy only won one race, but finished third in the 2006 Rockfel Stakes. Avenir Certain was purchased at the Arqana October Yearlings sale 2012, for the price of €45,000, and is currently trained by Jean-Claude Rouget.

== Racing career ==
=== 2013: Two-year-old season ===
Avenir Certain faced only two opponents in her racecourse debut, which took place on 8 October 2013 at Bordeaux Le Bouscat Racecourse. She was ridden by Jean-Bernard Eyquem and won race by two lengths from Helwan. Her only other race as a two-year-old was a conditions race at Chantilly, the Prix de la Grande Folie on 31 October, which she won this race by one length from Felcine.

=== 2014: Three-year-old season ===
Avenir Certain first start as a three-year-old was the Prix des Carrefours, a 1600m conditions race run on the polytrack at Chantilly on 9 April 2014. She started as a short-priced favourite and won by two lengths from runner-up Got Fly. Avenir Certain then contested the Group 1 Poule d'Essai des Pouliches. In the early stages of the race she was positioned near the middle of the 16-runner field by jockey Gregory Benoist. She drifted right in the finishing straight, but ran on to take the lead with about 200m left to run and pulled clear to win by one and a quarter lengths from Veda, with Xcellence a further two and a half lengths further back in third place. There was a stewards' inquiry into the result of the race for possible interference, but the placings were not altered.

In the Prix de Diane, she was held up near the rear of the field by Benoist. In the finishing straight, he pulled her wide of the rest of the field and she stayed on to challenge with about 100m left to run. She won the race, having pulled one length clear by the finish. Amour A Papa finished in second place, with Xcellence third and Shamkala fourth, all of which finished within half a length of each other. On 19 August, Avenir Certain started 3/5 favourite for the Group Two Prix de la Nonette over 2000 metres at Deauville Racecourse. She extended her unbeaten run to six, taking the lead inside the final furlong and winning easily by one and a half lengths from her stable companion Crisolles.

On 5 October, Avenir Certain moved up in distance to contest France's most prestigious race, the Prix de l'Arc de Triomphe over 2400 metres at Longchamp and started the 6/1 second favourite. She was ridden for the first time by Christophe Lemaire as Benoist rode the Prix Niel winner Ectot. She was among the leaders from the start and took second place in the straight but faded in the closing stages to finish eleventh of the twenty runners, six lengths behind the winner Treve.

== Breeding record ==
After her retirement from racing Avenir Certain was exported to Japan to become a broodmare. Her first foal Des Ailes, a filly by Deep Impact, won the Listed Sweetpea Stakes in 2020 and the Grade 2 Hanshin Himba Stakes in 2021.

== Pedigree ==
Pedigree of Avenir Certain, bay filly, 2011
Sire Le Havre (IRE) b. 2006	Noverre (USA) b. 1998	Rahy ch. 1985	Blushing Groom
Sire Le Havre (IRE) b. 2006	Noverre (USA) b. 1998	Rahy ch. 1985	Glorious Song
Sire Le Havre (IRE) b. 2006	Noverre (USA) b. 1998	Danseur Fabuleux b. 1982	Northern Dancer
Sire Le Havre (IRE) b. 2006	Noverre (USA) b. 1998	Danseur Fabuleux b. 1982	Fabuleux Jane
Sire Le Havre (IRE) b. 2006	Marie Rheinberg (GER) br. 2002	Surako b. 1993	Königsstuhl
Sire Le Havre (IRE) b. 2006	Marie Rheinberg (GER) br. 2002	Surako b. 1993	Surata
Sire Le Havre (IRE) b. 2006	Marie Rheinberg (GER) br. 2002	Marie d'Argonne ch. 1981	Jefferson
Sire Le Havre (IRE) b. 2006	Marie Rheinberg (GER) br. 2002	Marie d'Argonne ch. 1981	Mohair
Dam Puggy (IRE) b. 2004	Mark of Esteem (IRE) b. 1993	Darshaan br. 1981	Shirley Heights
Dam Puggy (IRE) b. 2004	Mark of Esteem (IRE) b. 1993	Darshaan br. 1981	Delsy
Dam Puggy (IRE) b. 2004	Mark of Esteem (IRE) b. 1993	Homage b. 1989	Ajdal
Dam Puggy (IRE) b. 2004	Mark of Esteem (IRE) b. 1993	Homage b. 1989	Home Love
Dam Puggy (IRE) b. 2004	Jakarta (IRE) b. 1999	Machiavellian b. 1987	Mr. Prospector
Dam Puggy (IRE) b. 2004	Jakarta (IRE) b. 1999	Machiavellian b. 1987	Coup de Folie
Dam Puggy (IRE) b. 2004	Jakarta (IRE) b. 1999	Lunda b. 1993	Soviet Star
Dam Puggy (IRE) b. 2004	Jakarta (IRE) b. 1999	Lunda b. 1993	Lucayan Princess

Note: b. = Bay, br. = Brown, ch. = Chestnut
