= Cristian Demuro =

Italian jockey (born 1992)

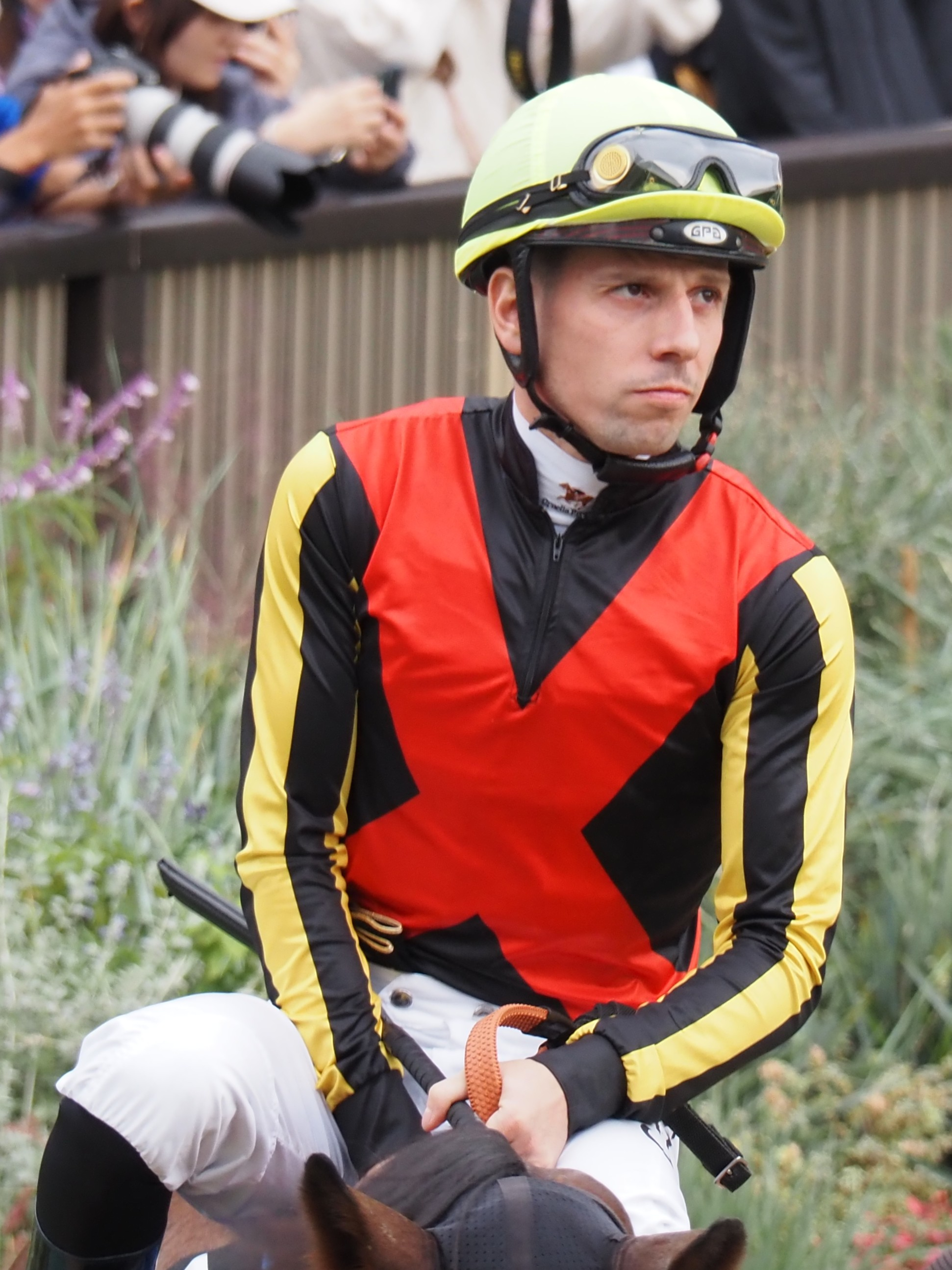

Cristian Demuro (born 8 July 1992) is an Italian jockey who competes in Flat racing. Demuro is now based in France and is noted for his major race three Prix du Jockey Club and two Prix de l'Arc de Triomphe riding Sottsass and Ace Impact. He is currently a first jockey for Nurlan Bizakov. He was champion jockey in Italy in 2011 and 2012., and Cravache d’or in France 2025. His elder brother Mirco also is a jockey, currently based in Japan.

== Major wins ==
France

- Prix de l'Arc de Triomphe - (2) - Sottsass (2020), Ace Impact (2023)
- Prix du Jockey Club - (3) - Brametot (2017), Sottsass (2019), Ace Impact (2023)
- Poule d'Essai des Poulains - (2) - Brametot (2017), Olmedo (2018)
- Prix de Diane - (1) - La Cressonniere (2016)
- Poule d'Essai des Pouliches - (2) - La Cressonniere (2016), Coeursamba (2021)
- Prix Ganay - (1) - Sottsass (2020)
- Prix Jean Romanet - (1) - Grand Glory (2021)
- Prix Saint Alary - (1) - Tawkeel (2020)
- Grand Prix de Paris - (3) - Helene Charisma (2016), Feed The Flame (2023), Leffard (2025)
- Prix Royal-Oak - (1) - Arrow Eagle (2025)

Italy

- Gran Premio di Milano - (1) - Biz The Nurse (2013)
- Gran Premio del Jockey Club - (1) - Ventura Storm (2016)

Japan

- Hopeful Stakes - (1) - Time Flyer (2017)
- Hanshin Juvenile Fillies - (1) - Danon Fantasy (2018)
- Oka Sho - (1) - Ayusan (2013)
- Queen Elizabeth II Cup - (2) - Geraldina (2022), Stunning Rose (2024)
- Asahi Hai Futurity Stakes - (1) - Cavallerizzo (2025)
- Arima Kinen - (1) - Museum Mile (2025)

United Arab Emirates

- Dubai Sheema Classic - (1) - Shahryar (2022)
- Dubai Turf - (1) - Soul Rush (2025)
- UAE Derby - (1) - Wonder Dean (2026)
