= Noverre =

American-bred Thoroughbred racehorse

- Sire: Rahy
- Grandsire: Blushing Groom
- Dam: Danseur Fabuleux
- Damsire: Northern Dancer
- Sex: Stallion
- Foaled: 2 May 1998
- Country: United States
- Colour: Bay
- Breeder: Darley Stud Management Inc.
- Owner: Godolphin Racing
- Trainer: David Loder; Saeed bin Suroor (at age 3)
- Record: 21: 5-8-3
- Earnings: £999,519

Major wins
- Prix d'Orgemont (2000); Prix La Flèche (2000); July Stakes (2000); Champagne Stakes (2000); Sussex Stakes (2001)

Noverre (May 2, 1998 – 2012) was an American-bred, British-trained Thoroughbred racehorse and sire.

== Background ==
Noverre was a bay horse bred by Darley Stud and raced by a sister operation, Godolphin Racing. He was sired by Rahy, out of the mare Danseur Fabuleux who was also the dam of 1991 European Horse of the Year, Arazi.

Noverre was trained at age two by David Loder.

== Racing career ==
Noverre won two listed races in France and two Group 2 events in England. Sent to the United States, the colt finished eleventh on dirt in the 2000 Breeders' Cup Juvenile, hosted that year by Churchill Downs. At age three, Noverre's owners turned his race conditioning over to Saeed bin Suroor. For him, Noverre finished first in the 2001 Poule d'Essai des Poulains at Longchamp Racecourse in Paris but was subsequently disqualified after testing positive for the banned substance Methylprednisolone. He went on to win the Group 1 Sussex Stakes at Goodwood Racecourse in Chichester, England. That year he also had second-place finishes in the UAE 2000 Guineas in Dubai and in England's St. James's Palace and Queen Elizabeth II Stakes.

Noverre returned to the track in 2002 for a four-year-old campaign. In top races, he notably earned runner-ups in the Dubai Duty Free Stakes and in England's Lockinge and Sussex Stakes.

== Stud record ==
Noverre was retired to stand at stud beginning in the 2003 season at his owner's Kildangan Stud in County Kildare, Ireland. In 2008, he was sold to breeders in India to stand at Sohna Stud Farm near Delhi, where he died in 2012. From his offspring, Noverre's best runner to date has been a 2006 colt named Le Havre who in 2009 won the Group 1 French Derby at Chantilly Racecourse.

Noverre is also the damsire of the 2025 Kikuka-shō winner Energico.

== Pedigree ==
Pedigree of Noverre (USA), bay stallion
Sire Rahy (USA) 1985	Blushing Groom (FR); 1974	Red God	Nasrullah
Sire Rahy (USA) 1985	Blushing Groom (FR); 1974	Red God	Spring Run
Sire Rahy (USA) 1985	Blushing Groom (FR); 1974	Runaway Bride	Wild Risk
Sire Rahy (USA) 1985	Blushing Groom (FR); 1974	Runaway Bride	Aimee
Sire Rahy (USA) 1985	Glorious Song (CAN); 1976	Halo	Hail To Reason
Sire Rahy (USA) 1985	Glorious Song (CAN); 1976	Halo	Cosmah
Sire Rahy (USA) 1985	Glorious Song (CAN); 1976	Ballade	Herbager
Sire Rahy (USA) 1985	Glorious Song (CAN); 1976	Ballade	Miss Swapsco
Dam Danseur Fabuleux (USA) 1982	Northern Dancer (CAN); 1961	Nearctic	Nearco
Dam Danseur Fabuleux (USA) 1982	Northern Dancer (CAN); 1961	Nearctic	Lady Angela
Dam Danseur Fabuleux (USA) 1982	Northern Dancer (CAN); 1961	Natalma	Native Dancer
Dam Danseur Fabuleux (USA) 1982	Northern Dancer (CAN); 1961	Natalma	Almahmoud
Dam Danseur Fabuleux (USA) 1982	Fabuleux Jane (USA); 1974	Le Fabuleux	Wild Risk
Dam Danseur Fabuleux (USA) 1982	Fabuleux Jane (USA); 1974	Le Fabuleux	Anguar
Dam Danseur Fabuleux (USA) 1982	Fabuleux Jane (USA); 1974	Native Partner	Raise A Native
Dam Danseur Fabuleux (USA) 1982	Fabuleux Jane (USA); 1974	Native Partner	Dinner Partner
