= Grégory Benoist =

Belgian jockey based in France

Grégory Benoist (born 7 February 1983 in Etterbeek) is a Belgian former flat racing jockey based in France. A son of a jockey, he apprenticed in 1999 at the AFASEC riding school in Chantilly and won his first race in the same year at Vittel. It took him more than ten years to establish himself as a top jockey, winning his first group race in 2009 Prix Miesque with Lixirova and his first Group 1 race in the 2013 Critérium International aboard Ectot. He was a retained jockey for Al Shaqab Racing in France from 2015 to 2019.

== Major wins ==
France

- Critérium International – (1) – Ectot (2013)
- Poule d'Essai des Pouliches – (1) – Avenir Certain (2014)
- Prix de Diane – (1) – Avenir Certain (2014)
- Prix Saint-Alary – (1) – Jemayel (2016)
- Prix Jean Prat – (1) – Zelzal (2016)
- Prix Rothschild – (1) – Qemah (2016)
- Prix d'Ispahan – (1) – Mekhtaal (2017)
- Prix Vermeille – (1) – Sweet Lady (2022)

(United Kingdom) Great Britain

- Coronation Stakes – (1) – Qemah (2016)
