= Rahy =

American-bred Thoroughbred racehorse

- Sire: Blushing Groom
- Grandsire: Red God
- Dam: Glorious Song
- Damsire: Halo
- Sex: Stallion
- Foaled: 1985
- Country: United States
- Colour: Chestnut
- Breeder: Hill 'n' Dale Farms
- Owner: Sheikh Maktoum
- Trainer: Michael Stoute (UK); Neil Drysdale (USA)
- Record: 13: 6-4-1
- Earnings: $307,767

Major wins
- Sirenia Stakes (1987); Bel Air Handicap (1989)

Awards
- Leading broodmare sire in Britain & Ireland (2000)
- Last updated on February 28, 2014

Rahy (February 18, 1985 – September 22, 2011) was a Thoroughbred racehorse who competed in England and the United States.

== Background ==
Bred by Hill 'n' Dale Farms in Lexington, Rahy was a son of Blushing Groom and out of the Eclipse Award winner and Canadian Horse Racing Hall of Fame mare Glorious Song.

Rahy was purchased as a yearling for US$2 million by Sheikh Maktoum bin Rashid Al Maktoum and brought to race in England for the 1987 season.

== Racing career ==
Out of his seven starts at ages two and three, Rahy won three races. In his most significant event, he ran second to Robert Sangster's colt Gallic League in the 1987 Middle Park Stakes at Newmarket Racecourse.

At age four, Rahy was sent to race in the United States, where he was conditioned by Neil Drysdale. He had six starts and won three times with his most important win coming at Hollywood Park Racetrack where he captured the then-GII Bel Air Handicap by 10 lengths.

== Stud record ==
Retired after a racing career that saw modest success with no Grade I wins, in 1990, Rahy was sent to stand at stud at Three Chimneys Farm in Midway, Kentucky. As a stallion, he quickly established himself as an important sire of a number of great horses including twelve millionaires. Some of his progeny are:

- Fantastic Light - 2001 European Horse of the Year and United States Champion Male Turf Horse, winner of the Breeders' Cup Turf
- Serena's Song - a U.S. Racing Hall of Fame inductee, she won eleven Grade 1 races and set a career earnings record for an American filly or mare.
- Noverre - multiple Group One winner based in England, where he was voted Champion 3-year-old Miler for 2001
- Mariah's Storm - multiple stakes winner, broodmare of Giant's Causeway
- Dreaming of Anna - winner of the 2006 Breeders' Cup Juvenile Fillies, voted 2006 U.S. 2-Year-Old Champion Filly

As of May 2006, Rahy's offspring had earned in excess of US$74 million. He was pensioned from stud duty on July 1, 2009, due to declining fertility. Rahy died on September 22, 2011, from complications of old age.

== Pedigree ==
Pedigree of Rahy, chestnut stallion, 1985
| Sire Blushing Groom | Red God | Nasrullah | Nearco |
| Sire Blushing Groom | Red God | Nasrullah | Mumtaz Begum |
| Sire Blushing Groom | Red God | Spring Run | Menow |
| Sire Blushing Groom | Red God | Spring Run | Boola Brook |
| Sire Blushing Groom | Runaway Bride | Wild Risk | Rialto |
| Sire Blushing Groom | Runaway Bride | Wild Risk | Wild Violet |
| Sire Blushing Groom | Runaway Bride | Aimee | Tudor Minstrel |
| Sire Blushing Groom | Runaway Bride | Aimee | Emali |
| Dam Glorious Song | Halo | Hail to Reason | Turn-To |
| Dam Glorious Song | Halo | Hail to Reason | Nothirdchance |
| Dam Glorious Song | Halo | Cosmah | Cosmic Bomb |
| Dam Glorious Song | Halo | Cosmah | Almahmoud |
| Dam Glorious Song | Ballade | Herbager | Vandale |
| Dam Glorious Song | Ballade | Herbager | Flagette |
| Dam Glorious Song | Ballade | Miss Swapsco | Cohoes |
| Dam Glorious Song | Ballade | Miss Swapsco | Soaring (family: 12-c) |
