= Dream and Do =

Irish-bred racehorse

Dream And Do
- Racing silks of Haras Du Logis Saint Germain
- Sire: Siyouni
- Grandsire: Pivotal
- Dam: Venetia's Dream
- Damsire: Librettist
- Sex: Filly
- Foaled: 19 February 2017
- Country: Ireland
- Colour: Bay
- Breeder: Haras du Logis Saint Germain
- Owner: Haras du Logis Saint Germain
- Trainer: Frederic Rossi
- Record: 6: 4-2-0
- Earnings: £219,087

Major wins
- Prix Miesque (2019); Poule d'Essai des Pouliches (2020)

Dream And Do (foaled 19 February 2017) is an Irish-bred, French-trained Thoroughbred racehorse. She showed great promise as a two-year-old in 2019 when she won three of her four races including the Group 3 Prix Miesque. In the following year she ran second in the Prix de la Grotte before taking the Poule d'Essai des Pouliches.

== Background ==
Dream And Do is a bay filly with a white star and snip bred in France by the Normandy-based Haras du Logis Saint Germain. As a yearling in August 2018 she was put up for auction at the Arqana Deauville sale but failed to reach her reserve price of $91,504. She was sent into training with Frederic Rossi at his base near Marseille and has been ridden in most of her races by Maxime Guyon.

She was from the sixth crop of foals sired by the Aga Khan's stallion Siyouni whose biggest win came in the 2009 running of the Prix Jean-Luc Lagardère. His other offspring have included Sottsass, Laurens and Ervedya. Dream And Do's dam, Venetia's Dream, showed no racing ability earning as she failed to win in eight appearances on the track. She was a half-sister to the dam of Charm Spirit and a descendant of the Canadian broodmare Ciboulette, making her also a relative of L'Enjoleur, Fanfreluche, La Voyageuse and Holy Roman Emperor.

== Racing career ==
=== 2019: two-year-old season ===
Dream And Do made her racecourse debut in a maiden race over 1500 metres on good-to-soft ground at Deauville Racecourse on 6 August when she finished second of the seven runners, beaten one and a half lengths by the André Fabre-trained winner Savarin. On 9 September she was partnered by Sylvain Guis in a 1600-metre maiden at Marseille Borely and recorded her first success as she won by a length from Pomme d'Amour at odds of 0.8/1. The filly then started favourite for the Prix Esmeralda over 1400 metres on soft ground at Maisons-Laffitte Racecourse on 1 October and won by two lengths and a head from Yomogi and Mageva.

Four weeks after her win in the Prix Esmeralda, Dream And Do was stepped up in class for the Group 3 Prix Miesque over the same course and distance. She went off the 1.3/1 favourite in an eight-runner field which also included Mageva, Yomogi and the Listed race winners Les Hogues and Sopran Ival. After disputing the lead with Yomogi she gained the advantage 300 metres from the finish and kept on well to hold off a late challenge from Les Hogues and win by a neck.

=== 2020: three-year-old season ===
The COVID-19 outbreak led to racing in France being suspended from 16 March. On 11 May, the day on which French racing resumed, Dream And Do contested the Group 3 Prix de la Grotte over 1600 metres at Longchamp Racecourse and went off the 6.1/1 fourth choice in the betting behind Tropbeau (winner of the Prix du Calvados and third in the Cheveley Park Stakes). After racing in mid division she took the lead 400 metres from the finish but was overstken by Tropbeau and beaten half a length into second place.

The 2020 edition of the Poule d'Essai des Pouliches was run over the straight 1600 metres course at Deauville Racecourse on 1 June after Longchamp was deemed to be in a "red zone" with high infection rates. Dream And Do was made the 7.8/1 fourth choice in the betting behind Tropbeau, Simeen (undefeated in three races) and Tickle Me Green. After being settled just behind the leaders and overcoming some interference as she attempted to obtain a clear run, Dream And Do overtook the front-running Marieta 100 metres from the finish and held off a strong late challenge from Speak of the Devil to win by a nose. After the race Frederic Rossi, who was recording the biggest win in a 30-year training career, commented "I knew that 1600 metres is really the end of her rope and in my opinion she is a real champion over 1400 metres. She has that ability to accelerate very quickly and it is a delicate balancing act with her over 1600 metres" before going on to state that the filly would probably skip the Prix de Diane in favour of the Prix Jean Prat.

== Pedigree ==
Pedigree of Dream And Do (IRE), bay filly, 2017
Sire Siyouni (FR) 2007	Pivotal (GB); 1993	Polar Falcon (USA)	Nureyev
Sire Siyouni (FR) 2007	Pivotal (GB); 1993	Polar Falcon (USA)	Marie d'Argonne
Sire Siyouni (FR) 2007	Pivotal (GB); 1993	Fearless Revival	Cozzene
Sire Siyouni (FR) 2007	Pivotal (GB); 1993	Fearless Revival	Stufida
Sire Siyouni (FR) 2007	Sichilla (IRE); 2002	Danehill (USA)	Danzig
Sire Siyouni (FR) 2007	Sichilla (IRE); 2002	Danehill (USA)	Razyana
Sire Siyouni (FR) 2007	Sichilla (IRE); 2002	Slipstream Queen (USA)	Conquistador Cielo
Sire Siyouni (FR) 2007	Sichilla (IRE); 2002	Slipstream Queen (USA)	Country Queen
Dam Venetia's Dream (IRE) 2009	Librettist (USA); 2002	Danzig	Northern Dancer (CAN)
Dam Venetia's Dream (IRE) 2009	Librettist (USA); 2002	Danzig	Pas de Nom
Dam Venetia's Dream (IRE) 2009	Librettist (USA); 2002	Mysterial	Alleged
Dam Venetia's Dream (IRE) 2009	Librettist (USA); 2002	Mysterial	Mysteries
Dam Venetia's Dream (IRE) 2009	Machaera (GB); 1993	Machiavellian (USA)	Mr. Prospector
Dam Venetia's Dream (IRE) 2009	Machaera (GB); 1993	Machiavellian (USA)	Coup de Folie
Dam Venetia's Dream (IRE) 2009	Machaera (GB); 1993	Somfas (USA)	What A Pleasure
Dam Venetia's Dream (IRE) 2009	Machaera (GB); 1993	Somfas (USA)	Ciboulette (Family: 4-g)
