= St Mark's Basilica (horse) =

French-bred, Irish-trained Thoroughbred racehorse

- Racing silks of Mr Derrick Smith
- Sire: Siyouni
- Grandsire: Pivotal
- Dam: Cabaret
- Damsire: Galileo
- Sex: Colt
- Foaled: 18 March 2018
- Country: France
- Colour: Bay
- Breeder: Robert Scarborough
- Owner: Derrick Smith, Susan Magnier & Michael Tabor
- Trainer: Aidan O'Brien
- Record: 9: 6-1-1
- Earnings: £2,196,080

Major wins
- Dewhurst Stakes (2020); Poule d'Essai des Poulains (2021); Prix du Jockey Club (2021); Eclipse Stakes (2021); Irish Champion Stakes (2021)

Awards
- Top-rated European two-year-old (2020); Cartier Champion Three-year-old Colt; European Horse of the Year; Timeform rating: 132
- Last updated on 8 November 2022

St Mark's Basilica (foaled 18 March 2018) is a French-bred, Irish-trained Thoroughbred racehorse. He was rated the best two-year-old in Europe in 2020 when he won two of his five races including the Dewhurst Stakes. On his first run of 2021 he won the Poule d'Essai des Poulains. He went on to win the Prix du Jockey Club and defeat older horses in the Eclipse Stakes and the Irish Champion Stakes.

== Background ==
St Mark's Basilica is a bay colt with an irregular white blaze and two white socks bred in France by Robert Scarborough. As a yearling he was consigned to the Tattersalls sale in October 2019 and was bought for 1,300,000 guineas by Michael Magnier on behalf of his father, John Magnier's Coolmore Stud organisation. He raced in the colours of the Coolmore partners Derrick Smith, Susan Magnier and Michael Tabor. He was sent into training with Aidan O'Brien at Ballydoyle.

He was from the seventh crop of foals sired by the Aga Khan's stallion Siyouni whose biggest win came in the 2009 running of the Prix Jean-Luc Lagardère. His other offspring have included Sottsass, Laurens and Ervedya. St Mark's Basilica's dam Cabaret, who was owned by Coolmore, won two races including the Silver Flash Stakes, and went on to become a very successful broodmare who produced the 2000 Guineas winner Magna Grecia. She was descended from the British broodmare Fiddlededee who was the ancestor of Mountain Lodge, Might and Power, Lucky Owners and Sariska.

== Racing career ==
=== 2020: two-year-old season ===
On his racecourse debut St Mark's Basilica started the 6/4 favourite for a maiden race over six furlongs at the Curragh on 26 July in which he was ridden by Wayne Lordan and finished second to the Ger Lyons-trained Coill Avon. Despite his defeat he was then stepped up sharply in class to contest the Group 1 Phoenix Stakes over the same course and distance on 9 August and went off the 7/2 favourite. With Lordan again in the saddle he kept on well in the straight but never looked likely to win and came home fifth of the ten runners behind Lucky Vega. Seamie Heffernan took the ride when the colt started odds-on favourite for a maiden at the Curragh on 22 August and recorded his first victory, taking the lead inside the final furlong and winning "readily" by one and a quarter lengths from Loch Lein.

St Mark's Basilica was promoted back to Group 1 class for the National Stakes at the Curragh on 13 September in which he was ridden by Ryan Moore and started at odds of 9/1. He stayed on well from the rear of the field and finished third, beaten one and a half lengths and a short head by Thunder Moon and Wembley (also trained by Aidan O'Brien). It had been intended that the colt would next contest the Prix Jean-Luc Lagardère at Longchamp Racecourse but the O'Brien contingent for the meeting was withdrawn when it became apparent that a batch of contaminated feed made it likely that they would fail drug tests. The colt was rerouted to England for the Dewhurst Stakes on soft ground at Newmarket Racecourse on 10 October in which he was ridden by Frankie Dettori and went off at odds of 10/1 in a fourteen-runner field. Thunder Moon started favourite while the other contenders included Cadillac (Juvenile Stakes), Chindit (Champagne Stakes), Wembley, Alkumait (Mill Reef Stakes), Etonian (Solario Stakes) and Tactical (July Stakes). St Mark's Basilica settled in mid-division as the 100/1 outsider Devilwala set the pace, before moving forward to take the lead approaching the final furlong. He kept on well in the closing stages to win by three quarters of a length from Wembley, with Thunder Moon taking third ahead of Devilwala. Aidan O'Brien commented "It was one of those weeks, but that's the way the cards have fallen for us... You'd think the first three look like they are proper Guineas horses, don't they? Frankie gave him a lovely ride... He's genuine, tough, and has class as well."

In the official European classification for 2020 St Mark's Basilica was rated the best two-year-old of the season, two pounds ahead of Supremacy and Wembley.

=== 2021: three-year-old season ===
==== Spring ====
For his first run as a three-year-old St Mark's Basilica was sent to France to contest the Poule d'Essai des Poulains over 1600 metres on very soft ground at Longchamp Racecourse on 16 May. Ridden by Ioritz Mendizabal he started third choice in the betting behind Poetic Flare and Sealiway in a twelve-runner field which also included Policy of Truth (Prix de Fontainebleau), Parchemin (Prix Isonomy), Normandy Bridge (Prix Thomas Bryon) and Mehmento (Surrey Stakes). After racing in mid-division St Mark's Basilica moved up on the outside approaching the final turn and produced a sustained run in the straight, overtaking the outsider Colosseo 150 metres from the finish and winning "comfortably" by one and three quarter lengths. Mendizabal commented "I was a bit cautious before setting him alight because he's been off a long time and so I took my time. But he settled it in two strides. He has that acceleration you only see with the cracks... When you're sitting on a Formula One car like him 250 metres from the winning post in a Classic it's a great feeling and it's why we do this job."

==== Summer ====
Mendizabal was again in the saddle when St Mark's Basilica returned to France three weeks later for the Prix du Jockey Club over 2100 metres on soft ground at Chantilly Racecourse and started the 2.8/1 favourite. His eighteen opponents on this occasion included Sealiway, Policy of Truth, Normandy Bridge, Van Gogh, Makaloun (Prix de Guiche), Baby Rider (Prix Greffulhe), Cheshire Academy (Prix Noailles), El Drama (Dee Stakes) and Adhamo (Prix La Force). St Mark's Basilica was positioned just behind the leaders before gaining the advantage 300 metres out and kept on well to win by one and three quarter lengths from Sealiway with Millebosc a short head away in third place. Aidan O'Brien, who was winning the race for the first time said "His qualities are that he has a lot of speed and he can quicken very well. He's a very relaxed horse, he travels well, and he's kind in his races. We thought all those were qualities he would need to win the Jockey Club... He's a lovely moving horse, he doesn't bend his leg much, he puts his leg straight out in front of him. That all suggests that good ground should suit him better".

For his next run, St Mark's Basilica was matched against older horses for the first time in the Eclipse Stakes at Sandown Park on 3 July when he was partnered by Ryan Moore and started favourite against three opponents, namely Mishriff, Addeybb and El Drama. He raced in third place before depriving Mishriff of the lead approaching the final furlong and drew away in the closing stages to win "readily" by three and a half lengths. O'Brien commented He had a lot to lose today by getting beat. It was going to neutralise all the work he had done up to now but he had to step in [against older horses] somewhere. They weren't two ordinary older horses. You'd often come here and meet Group 1 winners but not as strong as those fellas were. We’ve had horses that get into fights and brawl it out but he's very happy to follow horses and quicken, and he puts races to bed very quickly. That's what he did again today."

==== Autumn ====
The colt was expected to return to the track in the International Stakes at York Racecourse in August but sustained an injury in training. Instead he reappeared at the Irish Champion Stakes at Leopardstown Racecourse on 11 September when he was ridden by Moore and started the 5/6 favourite in a four-runner field which included Tarnawa, Poetic Flare and Patrick Sarsfield. He settled in third place before moving up to challenge Poetic Flare in the straight, but then hung to the right, impeding Tarnawa who was also making progress. He won the race by three quarters of a length and a nose from Tarnawa and Poetic Flare and a stewards' inquiry left the result unaltered. Moore received a one-day ban for "careless riding" and suggested that his mount's failure to keep a straight course had been due to his being alarmed by the big screen on the inside of the track. Aidan O'Brien commented "One thing we knew is that he does quicken. That's what he always had – his strong qualities are that he relaxes and can really turn it on... He's just an exceptional horse and we're very lucky to have him."

On 26 September it was announced that St Mark's Basilica had been retired from racing. Aidan O'Brien reported that the colt had returned from Leopardstown in good form but was found to be "sore" when he went back into full training. He described St Mark's Basilica as "a wonderful horse, possibly the best we have ever had in Ballydoyle." When St Mark's Basilica was announced to be standing as a stallion at Coolmore's farm in Ireland, Coolmore representative David O'Loughlin said, "He's the most exciting [stallion] prospect we’ve retired from Ballydoyle since his late grandfather Galileo."

On 10 November St Mark's Basilica was named Champion Three-year-old Colt and European Horse of the Year at the Cartier Racing Awards.

== Stud career ==
St Mark's Basilica stands as a stallion at Coolmore Stud at both Ireland and Australia. He had his first Group 1 winner as a sire when his daughter, Diamond Necklace, won the Prix Marcel Boussac in 2025.

=== Notable progeny ===
c = colt, f = filly, g = gelding

Foaled	Name	Sex	Major wins
2023	Diamond Necklace	f	Prix Marcel Boussac, Poule d'Essai des Pouliches, Prix de Diane, Nassau Stakes
2023	Saintly Dancer	f	The Thousand Guineas
2023	Thesecretadversary	c	Prix Jean Prat

== Pedigree ==
Pedigree of St Mark's Basilica (FR), bay colt, 2018
Sire Siyouni (FR) 2007	Pivotal (GB); 1993	Polar Falcon (USA)	Nureyev
Sire Siyouni (FR) 2007	Pivotal (GB); 1993	Polar Falcon (USA)	Marie d'Argonne
Sire Siyouni (FR) 2007	Pivotal (GB); 1993	Fearless Revival	Cozzene
Sire Siyouni (FR) 2007	Pivotal (GB); 1993	Fearless Revival	Stufida
Sire Siyouni (FR) 2007	Sichilla (IRE); 2002	Danehill (USA)	Danzig
Sire Siyouni (FR) 2007	Sichilla (IRE); 2002	Danehill (USA)	Razyana
Sire Siyouni (FR) 2007	Sichilla (IRE); 2002	Slipstream Queen (USA)	Conquistador Cielo
Sire Siyouni (FR) 2007	Sichilla (IRE); 2002	Slipstream Queen (USA)	Country Queen
Dam Cabaret (IRE) 2007	Galileo (IRE); 1998	Sadler's Wells (USA)	Northern Dancer (CAN)
Dam Cabaret (IRE) 2007	Galileo (IRE); 1998	Sadler's Wells (USA)	Fairy Bridge
Dam Cabaret (IRE) 2007	Galileo (IRE); 1998	Urban Sea (USA)	Miswaki
Dam Cabaret (IRE) 2007	Galileo (IRE); 1998	Urban Sea (USA)	Allegretta (GB)
Dam Cabaret (IRE) 2007	Witch of Fife (USA); 1993	Lear Fan	Roberto
Dam Cabaret (IRE) 2007	Witch of Fife (USA); 1993	Lear Fan	Wac
Dam Cabaret (IRE) 2007	Witch of Fife (USA); 1993	Fife (IRE)	Lomond (USA)
Dam Cabaret (IRE) 2007	Witch of Fife (USA); 1993	Fife (IRE)	Fiddle-Faddle (GB) (Family: 6-e)
