= Shin Emperor =

French-bred, Japanese-trained racehorse (foaled 2021)

Shin Emperor シンエンペラー
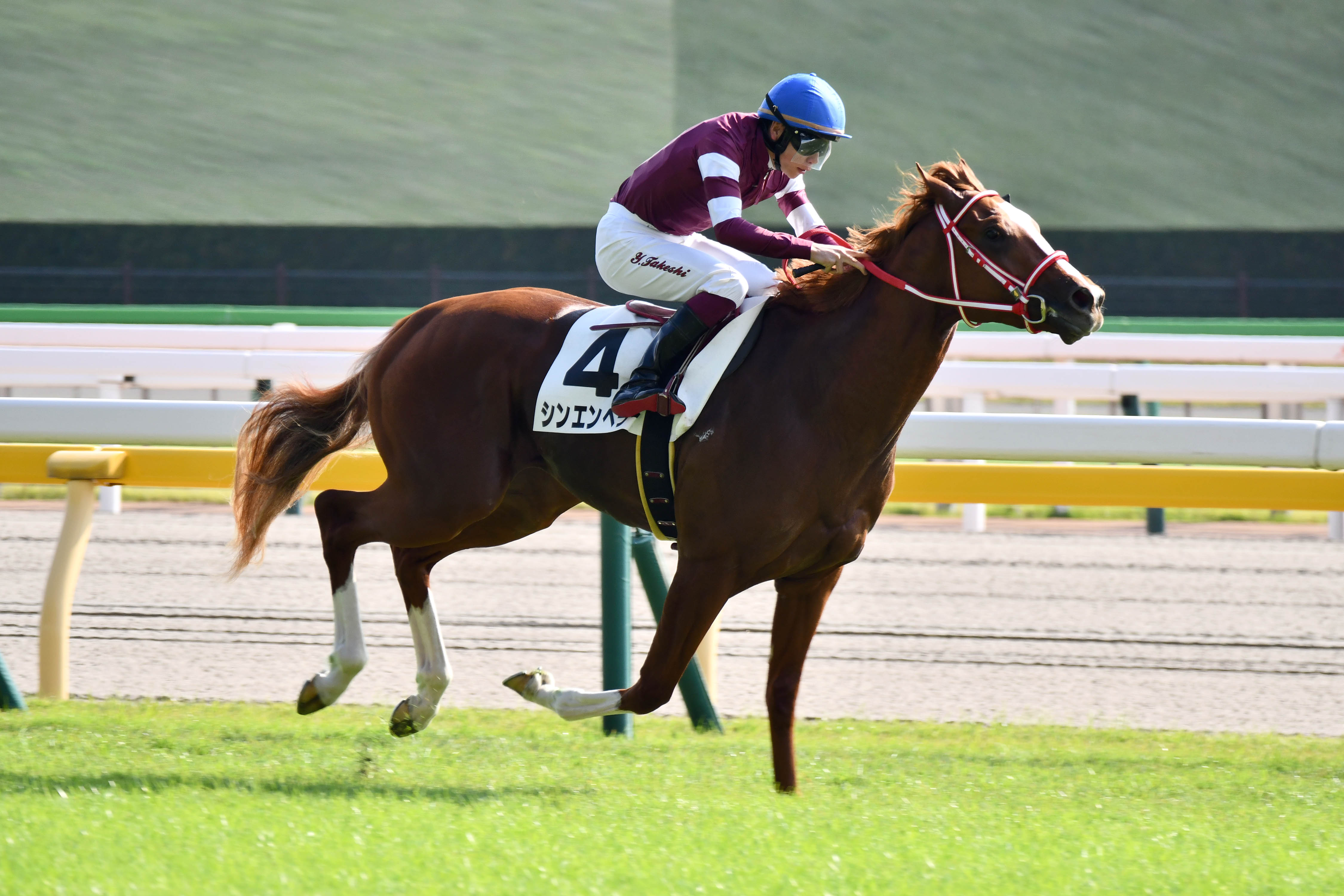
- Shin Emperor in his maiden race (2023, Tokyo Racecourse)
- Breed: Thoroughbred
- Sire: Siyouni
- Grandsire: Pivotal
- Dam: Starlet's Sister
- Damsire: Galileo
- Sex: Stallion
- Foaled: April 30, 2021 (age 5)
- Country: France
- Color: Chestnut
- Breeder: Ecurie Des Monceaux
- Owner: Susumu Fujita
- Racing colors
- Trainer: Yoshito Yahagi
- Jockey: Ryusei Sakai
- Record: 17: 3-3-2-8
- Earnings: 577,504,200 JPY; JPN: 356,044,000 JPY; IRE: 150,000 EUR; SAU: 1,200,000 USD; UAE: 60,000 USD

Major wins
- Kyoto Nisai Stakes (2023); Neom Turf Cup (2025)

Shin Emperor (Japanese: シンエンペラー, Hepburn: Shin Enperā; foaled April 30, 2021) is a retired French bred, Japanese trained thoroughbred racehorse.

The meaning of the name of the horse is "True Emperor" or "New Emperor".

== Background ==
Shin Emperor was sired by Siyouni, a successful sire who also sired the likes of Ervedya (Prix du Moulin de Longchamp), Laurens (Prix de Diane), Paddington (Eclipse Stakes). He was foaled by Starlet's Sister, who had previously foaled Sistercharlie (Breeders' Cup Filly & Mare Turf) as well as Shin Emperor's full brother Sottsass, the winner of the 2020 Prix de l'Arc de Triomphe.

In 2022 he was sold at the Arqana August Yearling Sales, and was bought by his would-be trainer, Yoshito Yahagi, representing CyberAgent founder Susumu Fujita, after outbidding Qatar Racing's David Redvers. The horse was the most expensive horse of that auction session, having gone up to 2.1 million Euros. After being purchased, he was sent to early training in Japan at Northern Farm Hayakita despite being a foreign-bred horse.

== Racing career ==
=== 2023: Two-year-old season ===
Shin Emperor made his debut at Tokyo Racecourse over a distance of 1800 meters with Takeshi Yokoyama as his jockey. He would run the race in third for most of the race before taking over the lead on the home stretch, winning the race with a three length lead. Following the race, it was announced that Shin Emperor would contest the Kyoto Nisai Stakes, with João Moreira as his jockey.

At the Kyoto Nisai Stakes, he had a poor start and ran in the back of the pack. However, Shin Emperor passed through the pack on the final stretch and clinched his first graded race win. This victory coincided with the death of his dam, Starlet's Sister, who died from colic the day before the race. This race also marked the first time a French bred horse won a JRA graded race since Daiwa Caerleon won the Fuji Stakes in 2008.

Shin Emperor finished the season with his first Grade I race, the Hopeful Stakes, where he lost to Regaleira by 3/4 lengths.

=== 2024: Three-year-old season ===
Shin Emperor started the season with the Yayoi Sho, which is ran in the same course and distance as the Satsuki Shō, the first leg of the Japanese Triple Crown. In the race he was positioned in the middle of the pack before making his push to take the lead at the third corner. He was able to take over the front runner Sirius Colt, he was unable to catch up to the winner Cosmo Kuranda, who would win the race with a 1 1/4 length lead against the horse.

As the horse finished second in the Yayoi Sho, he was given an entry slot for the Satsuki Shō, which would be his next race. From this race onwards, Ryusei Sakai would become the horse's main jockey. During the race, the horse ran in the middle of the pack even as the pace was extremely fast due to how fast the front runner, Meisho Tabaru, was running. He was able to come up to 4th, but was passed by Urban Chic and ultimately finished the race at 5th place.

After this, the horse was entered in to the second leg of the Japanese Triple Crown, the Tōkyō Yūshun. During the race, the horse ran in the middle of the pack, before attempting to take the lead. However, he was not able to catch up to the winner, Danon Decile, nor the runner-up, Justin Milano. After this race, it was announced that the horse would be sent to Europe, where he would race the Prix de l'Arc de Triomphe, the same race Sottsass won, after using the Irish Champion Stakes as a step race.

In the Irish Champion Stakes, he ran in fourth for most of the race, but was unable to push forward as Economics and Auguste Rodin had been in front of him. Despite this, the horse moved on to Auguste Rodin's outside on the home stretch and finished third behind those two races, narrowly fending off Los Angeles. At the Prix de l'Arc de Triomphe, he finished 12th after being unable to catch up to the lead.

After returning to Japan, he was entered in to the Japan Cup. The horse was only the eighth favored to win, but during the race he became the front runner after making a good start. Making the race's pace slow, the horse's lead was contested by Do Deuce and Durezza. While the lead was taken by Do Deuce, Shin Emperor and Durezza kept contesting the second place to the wire; ultimately finishing second in a dead heat with Durezza. After the race, the horse would take the rest of the year off, preparing to enter races in the Middle East for the following year.

=== 2025: Four-year-old season ===
Shin Emperor started the season with the Neom Turf Cup, an undercard of the Saudi Cup Night. During the race, Shin Emperor took the lead early on and held on to it, with the horse winning the race with a length and 3/4 lead, marking his first win since the Kyoto Nisai Stakes in 2023 as well as his first win abroad.

He was then entered in to the Dubai Sheema Classic, where he once again became the front runner. However, the horse lost momentum at the final stretch, and finished seventh behind Danon Decile. After returning to Japan, Yahagi announced that the horse would once again run the Irish Champion Stakes and the l'Arc.

On September 14, Shin Emperor was entered in to the Irish Champion Stakes, only to finish sixth behind Delacroix. After the race, the horse underwent a medical examination, where it was revealed that the horse suffered from asthma and lung hemorrhage. As a result, plans to enter the l'Arc was scrapped and the horse was returned to Japan.

After returning to Japan, the horse entered in the Japan Cup and the Arima Kinen, but finished 8th and 14th respectively.

=== 2026: Five-year-old season ===
On January 2, Yahagi announced the horse would start his five-year-old season with the Neom Turf Cup, the same race he won the previous year. In the race, the horse stayed intact with the leader group on the inside before switching to the outside track in which he unleashed his final sprint to finish in fourth place. The initial plan for his next race was to send him to the Queen Elizabeth II Cup in Sha Tin but was declined an invitation due to competition and track direction. Yahagi then diverted him towards the Turf Classic Stakes at Churchill Downs in America, but decided to pull out after his connections were warned the horse may fail the gait examination. Yahagi, who was unwilling to take the risk of taking the horse to the United States just to fail the examination, decided to divert him to the Tenno Sho (Spring) at Kyoto in May with new jockey Mirai Iwata at the saddle. On the race day, Shin Emperor positioned himself in tenth position before trying to make grounds on 200 metres and finished in seventh place. He would run at the Takarazuka Kinen for his next campaign and backed with his original jockey, Ryusei Sakai. On the day, he paced himself around 15th-position but only managed to improved until 11th-position on the line.

After the Takarazuka, while the horse is registered to run that year's Prix de lArc de Triomphe, Yahagi also expressed a possibility that Shin Emperor would travel to the United States together with stablemate Forever Young so that they can each race in that year's Breeders' Cup races. The horse was eventually sent to the United States with Forever Young, but was sent back to Japan shortly before the Breeders' Cup without starting in a single race due to health reasons.

After returning from Japan, his connections announced that the horse would be retired to stud duty at the Arrow Stud. His racehorse registration with the JRA was officially withdrawn on October 30.

== Racing statistics ==
The following racing form is based on information available on JBIS-Search, netkeiba.com, JRA-VAN, Racing Post, Emirates Racing Authority, the France Galop and Jockey Club of Saudi Arabia.

Date	Track	Race	Grade	Distance (Condition)	Entry	HN	Odds (Favored)	Finish	Time	Margins	Jockey	Winner (Runner-up)
2023 – two-year-old season
Nov 4	Tokyo	2YO Newcomer		1,800 m (Firm)	13	4	4.0 (2)	1st	1:48.1	-0.5	Takeshi Yokoyama	(True Successor)
Nov 25	Kyoto	Kyoto Nisai Stakes	3	2,000 m (Firm)	14	5	3.7 (1)	1st	1:59.8	-0.1	João Moreira	(Prelude City)
Dec 28	Nakayama	Hopeful Stakes	1	2,000 m (Firm)	16	6	3.2 (2)	2nd	2:00.3	0.1	Bauyrzhan Murzabayev	Regaleira
2024 – three-year-old season
Mar 3	Nakayama	Yayoi Sho	2	2,000 m (Firm)	11	5	3.5 (3)	2nd	2:00.0	0.2	Yuga Kawada	Cosmo Kuranda
Apr 14	Nakayama	Satsuki Shō	1	2,000 m (Firm)	17	14	8.4 (5)	5th	1:57.5	0.4	Ryusei Sakai	Justin Milano
May 26	Tokyo	Tōkyō Yūshun	1	2,400 m (Firm)	17	13	17.8 (7)	3rd	2:24.9	0.6	Ryusei Sakai	Danon Decile
Sep 14	Leopardstown	Irish Champion Stakes	1	2,000 m (Good)	8	8	7.9 (4)	3rd	2:03.4	0.2	Ryusei Sakai	Economics
Oct 6	Longchamp	Prix de l'Arc de Triomphe	1	2,400 m (Tres Souples)	16	10	6.3 (3)	12th	2:33.48	1.9	Ryusei Sakai	Bluestocking
Nov 24	Tokyo	Japan Cup	1	2,400 m (Firm)	14	7	26.8 (8)	2nd	2:25.5	0.0	Ryusei Sakai	Do Deuce
2025 – four-year-old season
Feb 22	King Abdulaziz	Neom Turf Cup	2	2,100 m (Firm)	10	6	1.37 (1)	1st	2:07.74	-0.35	Ryusei Sakai	(Calif)
Apr 5	Meydan	Dubai Sheema Classic	1	2,410 m (Good)	9	8	5.8 (3)	7th	2:28.57	1.52	Ryusei Sakai	Danon Decile
Sept 13	Leopardstown	Irish Champion Stakes	1	2,000 m (Good to Yielding)	16	10	6.3 (3)	6th	2:06.1	1.5	Ryusei Sakai	Delacroix
Nov 30	Tokyo	Japan Cup	1	2,400 m (Firm)	17	16	28.9 (7)	8th	2:21.4	1.1	Ryusei Sakai	Calandagan
Dec 28	Nakayama	Arima Kinen	1	2,500 m (Firm)	16	2	26.6 (6th)	14th	2:32.6	1.1	Ryusei Sakai	Museum Mile
2026 – five-year-old season
Feb 14	King Abdulaziz	Neom Turf Cup	1	2,100 m (Firm)	11	7	9/2 (4)	4th	2:07.26	1.04	Ryusei Sakai	Royal Champion
May 3	Kyoto	Tenno Sho (Spring)	1	3,200 m (Firm)	15	8	30.2 (6)	7th	3:14.6	0.9	Mirai Iwata	Croix du Nord
Jun 14	Hanshin	Takarazuka Kinen	1	2,200 m (Yielding)	18	11	85.0 (12)	11th	2:14.2	2.1	Ryusei Sakai	Meisho Tabaru

Legend:
Turf

== Pedigree ==
Pedigree of Shin Emperor
Sire Siyouni 2007 b.	Pivotal; 1993 ch.	Popular Falcon	Nureyev
Sire Siyouni 2007 b.	Pivotal; 1993 ch.	Popular Falcon	Marie d'Argonne
Sire Siyouni 2007 b.	Pivotal; 1993 ch.	Fearless Revival	Cozzene
Sire Siyouni 2007 b.	Pivotal; 1993 ch.	Fearless Revival	Stufida
Sire Siyouni 2007 b.	Sichilla	Danehill	Danzig
Sire Siyouni 2007 b.	Sichilla	Danehill	Razyana
Sire Siyouni 2007 b.	Sichilla	Slipstream Queen	Conquistador Cielo
Sire Siyouni 2007 b.	Sichilla	Slipstream Queen	Country Queen
Dam Starlet's Sister 2009 ch.	Galileo; 1998 b.	Sadler's Wells	Northern Dancer
Dam Starlet's Sister 2009 ch.	Galileo; 1998 b.	Sadler's Wells	Fairy Bridge
Dam Starlet's Sister 2009 ch.	Galileo; 1998 b.	Urban Sea	Miswaki
Dam Starlet's Sister 2009 ch.	Galileo; 1998 b.	Urban Sea	Allegretta
Dam Starlet's Sister 2009 ch.	Premiere Creation; 1991 ch.	Green Tune	Green Dancer
Dam Starlet's Sister 2009 ch.	Premiere Creation; 1991 ch.	Green Tune	Soundings
Dam Starlet's Sister 2009 ch.	Premiere Creation; 1991 ch.	Allwaki	Miswaki
Dam Starlet's Sister 2009 ch.	Premiere Creation; 1991 ch.	Allwaki	Alloy
