= Paddington (horse) =

Irish trained racehorse

- Racing silks of Michael Tabor
- Sire: Siyouni
- Grandsire: Pivotal
- Dam: Modern Eagle
- Damsire: Montjeu
- Sex: Colt
- Foaled: 2 April 2020
- Country: United Kingdom
- Colour: Bay
- Breeder: Darley Investments
- Owner: Derrick Smith, Susan Magnier, Michael Tabor, Westerberg & Peter Brant
- Trainer: Aidan O'Brien
- Record: 10: 7-0-1
- Earnings: £1,750,280

Major wins
- Madrid Handicap (2023); Tetrarch Stakes (2023); Irish 2,000 Guineas (2023); St James's Palace Stakes (2023); Eclipse Stakes (2023); Sussex Stakes (2023)
- Last updated on 21 October 2023

Paddington (foaled April 2, 2020) is a British-bred, Irish-trained multiple Group 1 winning Thoroughbred racehorse. In 2023 Paddington won his first six starts winning four Group 1 events including the Irish 2,000 Guineas in Ireland and the St James's Palace Stakes, Coral-Eclipse and Sussex Stakes in England.

== Background ==
Paddington is a bay colt with no white markings bred in Ireland by Dayton Investments. As a yearling he was consigned to the Arqana sale at Deauville and was bought for €420,000 by Broadhurst Agency and Michael Magnier on behalf of the Coolmore Stud. He raced in the ownership of the Coolmore partners Michael Tabor, Sue Magnier and Derrick Smith in association with Georg von Opel's Westerberg organisation and Peter Brant. He was sent into training with Aidan O'Brien at Ballydoyle.

He was from the ninth crop of foals sired by the Aga Khan's stallion Siyouni whose biggest win came in the 2009 running of the Prix Jean-Luc Lagardère. His other offspring have included St Mark's Basilica, Sottsass, Laurens and Ervedya. Paddington's dam Modern Eagle won three races in France including the Listed Prix Belle de Nuit. She was a grand-daughter of the Prix Saint-Alary winner Moonlight Dance who was in turn a daughter of Madelia.

== Racing career ==
=== 2022: two-year-old season ===
For his racecourse debut, Paddington was sent to England for a seven furlong maiden race at the Ascot Racecourse on 2 September when he started at odds of 9/2 and came home fifth of the eight runners behind City of KIngs, beaten eight lengths by the winner. In October at the Curragh the colt started 16/5 favourite for a similar contest and recorded his first success. Ridden by Seamie Heffernan he raced in second place before taking the lead two furlongs from the finish and drew away to win by five lengths from Rochester Mike.

=== 2023: three-year-old season ===
On his first appearance as a three-year-old Paddington was assigned top weight of 135 pounds for the Madrid Handicap over seven furlongs on heavy ground at Naas Racecourse on 26 March. Ridden by Ryan Moore he started the 6/4 favourite and won "comfortably" by one and three quarter lengths from Duke of Leggagh after taking the lead approaching the final furlong. Heffernan was in the saddle when the colt was stepped up in class and distance for the Listed Tetrarch Stakes over one mile at the Curragh on 1 May and started odds-on favourite in a six-runner field. After tracking the leaders he moved up to take the lead in the last quarter mile and stayed on well to win by one and a half lengths from his stablemate Drumroll.

== Statistics ==
Date	Distance	Race	Group Grade	Track	Odds	Field	Finish	Time	Winning (Losing) Margin	Jockey	Ref
2022 – two-year-old season
2 Sep 2022	7 furlongs	Maiden		Ascot	9/2	8	5	1:29.55	(8 lengths)	Ryan Moore	
13 Oct 2022	7 furlongs	Maiden		Curragh	16/5	20	1	1:29.99	5 lengths	Seamie Heffernan	
2023 – three-year-old season
26 March 2023	7 furlongs	Madrid Handicap		Naas	6/4*	7	1	1:40.71	1 3/4 lengths	Ryan Moore	
1 May 2023	1 mile	Tetrarch Stakes	Listed	Curragh	5/6*	6	1	1:46.68	1 1/2 lengths	Seamie Heffernan	
27 May 2023	1 mile	Irish 2,000 Guineas	I	Curragh	3/1	11	1	1:40.80	2 lengths	Ryan Moore	
20 Jun 2023	7 furlongs 213 yards	St James's Palace Stakes	I	Royal Ascot	11/5	9	1	1:40.74	3 3/4 lengths	Ryan Moore	
8 Jul 2023	1m 1f 209y	Coral-Eclipse	I	Sandown Park	8/11*	4	1	2:05.16	1/2 length	Ryan Moore	
2 Aug 2023	1 mile	Sussex Stakes	I	Goodwood	4/9*	5	1	1:47.16	1 1/2 lengths	Ryan Moore	
23 Aug 2023	1m 2f 56y	Juddmonte International	I	York	4/6*	4	3	2:06.40	(1 1/4 lengths)	Ryan Moore	
21 Oct 2023	1 mile	Queen Elizabeth II Stakes	I	Ascot	7/4*	11	9	1:44.58	(35 1/4 lengths)	Ryan Moore	

Legend:
Turf
Notes:
An (*) asterisk after the odds means Paddington was the post-time favourite.

== Stud ==
On 26 October 2023 Paddington's connections announced that he had contacted an infection, would not compete in the Breeders' Cup and had been retired from racing. Paddington will stand at Coolmore Stud in Ireland. His stallion fee for the 2024 season will be €55,000.

In the same year he also performed as a shuttle stallion out of Windsor Park Stud in Cambridge, New Zealand.

== Pedigree ==
Pedigree of Paddington (GB), bay colt, April 2, 2020
Sire Siyouni (FR) (2007)	Pivotal (GB) (1993)	Polar Falcon (1987)	Nureyev (1977)
Sire Siyouni (FR) (2007)	Pivotal (GB) (1993)	Polar Falcon (1987)	Marie d'Argonne (FR) (1980)
Sire Siyouni (FR) (2007)	Pivotal (GB) (1993)	Fearless Revival (GB) (1987)	Cozzene (1981)
Sire Siyouni (FR) (2007)	Pivotal (GB) (1993)	Fearless Revival (GB) (1987)	Stufida (GB) (1980)
Sire Siyouni (FR) (2007)	Sichilla (IRE) (2002)	Danehill (1986)	Danzig (1977)
Sire Siyouni (FR) (2007)	Sichilla (IRE) (2002)	Danehill (1986)	Razyana (1981)
Sire Siyouni (FR) (2007)	Sichilla (IRE) (2002)	Slipstream Queen (1980)	Conquistador Cielo (1979)
Sire Siyouni (FR) (2007)	Sichilla (IRE) (2002)	Slipstream Queen (1980)	Country Queen (1975)
Dam Modern Eagle (GER) (2010)	Montjeu (IRE) (1996)	Sadler's Wells (1981)	Northern Dancer (CAN) (1961)
Dam Modern Eagle (GER) (2010)	Montjeu (IRE) (1996)	Sadler's Wells (1981)	Fairy Bridge (1975)
Dam Modern Eagle (GER) (2010)	Montjeu (IRE) (1996)	Floripedes (FR) (1985)	Top Ville (IRE) (1976)
Dam Modern Eagle (GER) (2010)	Montjeu (IRE) (1996)	Floripedes (FR) (1985)	Toute Cy (FR) (1979)
Dam Modern Eagle (GER) (2010)	Millionaia (IRE) (2001)	Peintre Celebre (1994)	Nureyev (1977)
Dam Modern Eagle (GER) (2010)	Millionaia (IRE) (2001)	Peintre Celebre (1994)	Peinture Bleue (1987)
Dam Modern Eagle (GER) (2010)	Millionaia (IRE) (2001)	Moonlight Dance (1991)	Alysheba (1984)
Dam Modern Eagle (GER) (2010)	Millionaia (IRE) (2001)	Moonlight Dance (1991)	Madelia (FR) (1974) (Family: 1-p)

Paddington is inbred 4s × 4d to Nureyev
