= Siyarafina =

French-bred racehorse

- Sire: Pivotal
- Grandsire: Polar Falcon
- Dam: Siyenica
- Damsire: Azamour
- Sex: Mare
- Foaled: 24 April 2016
- Country: France
- Colour: Bay
- Breeder: Aga Khan IV
- Owner: Aga Khan IV
- Trainer: Alain de Royer-Dupré
- Record: 4: 3-0-0
- Earnings: £155,721

Major wins
- Prix Saint-Alary (2019)

Siyarafina (foaled 24 April 2016) is a French Thoroughbred racehorse. In a brief racing career that lasted from April to June 2019, she won three of her four races including the Group 1 Prix Saint-Alary. After winning a maiden race on her debut she took the Prix de Louvre and then recorded her biggest success when she defeated ten opponents to win the Prix Saint-Alary at Longchamp. She finished unplaced when favourite for the Prix de Diane and was retired from racing soon afterwards.

== Background ==
Siyarafina is a bay mare with white socks on her hind legs bred in France by her owner Aga Khan IV. She was sent into training with Alain de Royer-Dupré at Chantilly.

She was from the nineteenth crop of foals sired by Pivotal, a top class sprinter who won the King's Stand Stakes and the Nunthorpe Stakes in 1996. He went on to become an "excellent" sire, getting the winners of more than a thousand races across a range of distances including Sariska, Somnus, Farhh, Kyllachy and Immortal Verse.

Siyarafina's dam Siyenica showed good racing ability, winning two races including the Listed Prix de Bagatelle as well as finishing third in the Prix Daniel Wildenstein. Her dam Sichilla also produced Siyouni (Prix Jean-Luc Lagardère) and Siyouma and was a half-sister to the Grand Prix de Paris winner Slickly.

== Racing career ==
=== 2019: three-year-old season ===
After failing to appear on the track as a juvenile, Siyarafina made her debut on 4 April in a maiden race over 1600 metres at Saint-Cloud Racecourse in which she was ridden, as in all of her races, by Christophe Soumillon. Starting the 2.9/1 second favourite she took the lead inside the last 200 metres from the finish and won by two lengths from Wishfully with Villa Marina taking third. Eighteen days after her maiden win Siyarafina was stepped up in class for the Prix du Louvre over the same distance at Longchamp Racecourse and started the 0.6/1 favourite against six opponents. She won again, coming from off the pace in a slowly-run race to win by half a length and a half from Commes.

Siyarafina was then aimed at the Group 1 Poule d'Essai des Pouliches but was withdrawn from the race after performing poorly in a training gallop. On her return to the track on 26 May Siyarafina was moved up in distance and started the 0.7/1 favourite for the Prix Saint-Alary over 2000 metres on good to soft ground at Longchamp. Her ten opponents included Platane (Prix Vanteaux), Fount (unbeaten in two starts), Imperial Charm (fourth in the Poule d'Essai des Pouliches), Phoceene (Listed Prix Rose de Mai), Cala Tarida (Prix des Réservoirs) and Olendon (Listed Prix Finlande). Siyarafina raced in mid-division before moving up to take second place behind Imperial Charm in the straight. She overtook the British-trained leader 100 metres from the finish and kept on to win by a length from Olendon, with Imperial Charm half a length back in third. Her victory was the first Group 1 win for the Aga Khan in almost two years. After the race Soumillon said "She had been working better for a few days, but she is far from 100 per cent. However, winning her Group 1 after three outings, it's great – especially as she is not yet in the best of shape. She blows a lot like a mare who lacks a real preparation. It was just a prep race. She's run three times for three wins, which leaves great hopes".

On 16 June at Chantilly Racecourse Siyarafina was made the 6/4 favourite in a sixteen-runner field for the 2100 metre Prix de Diane. After being restrained in the early stages she stayed on well in the straight but was unable to reel in the leaders and finished sixth, beaten just over a length by the winner Channel in a blanket finish. A month later it was announced that Siyarafina had been retired to become a broodmare for her owner's stud.

== Pedigree ==
Pedigree of Siyarafina (FR), bay mare, 2016
Sire Pivotal (GB) 1993	Polar Falcon (USA); 1987	Nureyev	Northern Dancer (CAN)
Sire Pivotal (GB) 1993	Polar Falcon (USA); 1987	Nureyev	Special
Sire Pivotal (GB) 1993	Polar Falcon (USA); 1987	Marie d'Argonne (FR)	Jefferson (GB)
Sire Pivotal (GB) 1993	Polar Falcon (USA); 1987	Marie d'Argonne (FR)	Mohair
Sire Pivotal (GB) 1993	Fearless Revival; 1987	Cozzene (USA)	Caro (IRE)
Sire Pivotal (GB) 1993	Fearless Revival; 1987	Cozzene (USA)	Ride The Trails
Sire Pivotal (GB) 1993	Fearless Revival; 1987	Stufida	Bustino
Sire Pivotal (GB) 1993	Fearless Revival; 1987	Stufida	Zerbinetta
Dam Siyenica (FR) 2010	Azamour (IRE); 2001	Night Shift (USA)	Northern Dancer (CAN)
Dam Siyenica (FR) 2010	Azamour (IRE); 2001	Night Shift (USA)	Ciboulette (CAN)
Dam Siyenica (FR) 2010	Azamour (IRE); 2001	Asmara (USA)	Lear Fan
Dam Siyenica (FR) 2010	Azamour (IRE); 2001	Asmara (USA)	Anaza (IRE)
Dam Siyenica (FR) 2010	Sichilla (IRE); 2002	Danehill (USA)	Danzig
Dam Siyenica (FR) 2010	Sichilla (IRE); 2002	Danehill (USA)	Razyana
Dam Siyenica (FR) 2010	Sichilla (IRE); 2002	Slipstream Queen (USA)	Conquistador Cielo
Dam Siyenica (FR) 2010	Sichilla (IRE); 2002	Slipstream Queen (USA)	Country Queen (Family: 12-b)
