= Sottsass =

French Thoroughbred racehorse

- Racing silks of Peter Brant
- Sire: Siyouni
- Grandsire: Pivotal
- Dam: Starlet's Sister
- Damsire: Galileo
- Sex: Colt
- Foaled: 24 March 2016
- Country: France
- Colour: Chestnut
- Breeder: Ecurie des Monceaux
- Owner: White Birch Farm
- Trainer: Jean-Claude Rouget
- Record: 12: 6-1-1
- Earnings: £1,856,890

Major wins
- Prix de Suresnes (2019); Prix du Jockey Club (2019); Prix Niel (2019); Prix Ganay (2020); Prix de l'Arc de Triomphe (2020)

Sottsass (foaled 24 March 2016) is a French Thoroughbred racehorse. He showed promise as a two-year-old in 2018 when he won the second of his two starts. In the following year, he developed into a top-class middle distance performer with wins in the Prix de Suresnes, Prix du Jockey Club, and Prix Niel. In his four-year-old season in 2020, he won the Prix Ganay before concluding his career by winning the Prix de l'Arc de Triomphe.

== Background ==
Sottsass is a chestnut colt with a white blaze and a white sock on his right hind leg bred in France by the Ecurie Des Monceaux. In August 2017, the yearling was consigned to the Arqana sale at Deauville and was bought for €340,000 by Oceanic Bloodstock. He entered the ownership of Peter Brant's White Birch Farm and was sent into training with Jean-Claude Rouget. The colt was named by Brant after the Italian architect and designer Ettore Sottsass.

He was from the fifth crop of foals sired by the Aga Khan's stallion Siyouni, whose biggest win came in the 2009 running of the Prix Jean-Luc Lagardère. His other offspring include Laurens and Ervedya. Sottsass is the third foal of his dam Starlet's Sister, who had previously produced Sistercharlie and My Sister Nat (Prix Bertrand de Tarragon), and went on to foal Sottsass' full brother Shin Emperor. She showed little racing ability, failing to win in three starts in France, but was a great-granddaughter of Alea, who produced Noalcoholic and was the female-line ancestor of Preakness Stakes winner Red Bullet.

== Racing career ==
=== 2018: two-year-old season ===
Sottsass began his racing career in a contest for unraced juveniles over 1600 metres at Deauville Racecourse on 21 August in which he came home fourth of the nine runners, more than eight lengths behind the Freddy Head-trained winner Lone Peak. On 26 October at Clairefontaine Racecourse, the colt started at odds of 2.7/1 for a maiden race and recorded his first success as he won by three lengths from Flop Shot.

=== 2019: three-year-old season ===
On his three-year-old debut, Sottsass was stepped up in class for the Group 3 Prix La Force over 1800 metres at Longchamp Racecourse on 7 April and came home fifth behind Shaman in a seven-runner field. In the Listed Prix de Suresnes over 2000 metres on soft ground at Chantilly Racecourse on 2 May, he was ridden, as in all of his previous starts, by Christophe Soumillon. He was made the 2.1/1 favourite and won by six and a half lengths from Battle of Toro.

Cristian Demuro took the ride on 2 June when Sottsass contested the Group 1 Prix du Jockey Club over 2100 metres at Chantilly and went off the 13/1 fifth choice in a fifteen-runner field. The Poule d'Essai des Poulains winner Persian King started favourite, while the other fancied runners included Zarkallani (ridden by Soumillon), Slalom (Prix Noailles), Roman Candle (Prix Greffulhe), Raise You (Fairway Stakes), Cape of Good Hope (Blue Riband Trial Stakes), and Kick On (Feilden Stakes). Sottsass raced in mid-division as Motamarris set the pace but began to make rapid progress approaching the last 400 metres. He gained the advantage 200 metres from the finish and stayed on well to win "readily" by two lengths from Persian King. After the race, Demuro said, "Without really trying, I found myself directly behind Persian King, and he took me into the race with his acceleration. I knew he was the horse to beat, and once I was past him, it was easy".

After a break of more than three months, Sottsass returned on 15 September for the Group 2 Prix Niel (a major trial race for the Prix de l'Arc de Triomphe) over 2400 metres at Longchamp and started the 1/2 favourite against four opponents. With Demuro in the saddle, he was restrained in the early stages before making progress on the inside rail in the straight. He briefly looked unlikely to obtain a clear run but accelerated through a gap to take the lead in the closing stages and won by one and a quarter lengths from Mutamakina with Mohawk a short neck away in third place. On 6 October, Sotsass was made the 6.6/1 second favourite for France's most prestigious race, the Prix de l'Arc de Triomphe over 2400 metres on very soft ground at Longchamp. Ridden by Demuro, he raced in mid-division before making steady progress in the straight and finishing third behind Waldgeist and Enable.

In the 2019 World's Best Racehorse Rankings, was given a rating of 123, making him the sixteenth-best racehorse in the world and the best three-year-old.

=== 2020: four-year-old season ===
On 11 May, the day on which French racing restarted after the COVID-19 outbreak, Sottsass began his third campaign in the Group 2 Prix d'Harcourt over 2000 metres on very soft ground at Longchamp. Starting the 2/5 favourite, he was restrained towards the rear before moving into contention in the straight but was unable to accelerate in the closing stages and came home fourth of the nine runners behind Shaman, Way To Paris, and Simona. In the Prix Ganay over 2100 metres at Chantilly on 14 June, Sottsass started favourite against Shaman, Way To Paris, Simona, and Palomba. With Demuro in the saddle, he raced in third place before going to the front 200 metres from the finish and holding off a late challenge from Way To Paris to win by a head. Rouget's assistant Jean-Bernard Roth commented, "He's an emotive horse and he didn't run up to form in his comeback, not for the first time. But where would be the point in having the horse at 100 per cent on May 11? What I liked was how calm he was today. He was a very backward horse who is now maturing and I think he'll reach that full maturity this year. You don't have to cover him up anymore, you can ride him any way you want. He's just a very good horse and he has that acceleration that the good ones have."

After a two-month break, Sottsass returned in the Group 3 Prix Gontaut-Biron over 2000 metres at Deauville Racecourse in August in which he started favourite but was beaten a neck into second place by the five-year-old gelding Skalleti, with the pair finishing well clear of the other five runners. Colin Keane took the ride when the colt was sent to Ireland to contest the Irish Champion Stakes over ten furlongs at Leopardstown Racecourse on 12 September. Starting the 5/1 third choice in the betting, he tracked the leaders for most of the way but was unable to make any significant progress in the straight and came home fourth behind Magical, Ghaiyyath, and Armory.

On 4 October, Sottsass, with Demuro back in the saddle, made his second attempt to win the Prix de l'Arc de Triomphe and went off the 7.3/1 fourth choice in the betting behind Enable, Stradivarius, and Persian King. The other seven contenders, in a race run on heavy ground, were In Swoop (German Derby), Raabihah (Prix de Psyche), Gold Trip (Prix Greffulhe), Way To Paris, Deirdre, Chachnak (Prix du Prince d'Orange), and Royal Julius (Premio Presidente della Repubblica). Sotsass settled in third place as Persian King set a slow pace. He overtook Persian King 200 metres from the finish, saw off the challenge of Gold Trip on the outside, and repelled the late charge of In Swoop to win by a neck. After the race, Rouget said, “We've worked all year for this. Our entire aim for 2020 was this, and it's not been easy with the changes to the calendar. We've never been able to do quite what we wanted with the horse. But these last few days, I've really felt he was in top form. It was a difficult choice to go to Leopardstown, but we decided that the shorter distance would sharpen him up and it was the right choice. Everything was designed to have him at 100% today and the result is there," while Demuro commented, "I think it was won at the start... when I realized we were not going that fast, I felt confident he could outsprint them in the straight. It was a big help and I knew his turn of foot would kill off the others."

Two days after his victory in the Arc, it was announced that Sottsass had been retired from racing and would begin his career as a breeding stallion at the Coolmore Stud in 2021. Peter Brant commented, "I am a big believer that a horse should go to stud when they are ready, when they look fine like a shiny penny, and not beat up. The horse has done everything in the world I could have asked him for... He’s a beautiful horse."

In 2024, he was sold to Japan at the Shizunai Stallion Station.

== Pedigree ==
Pedigree of Sottsass (FR), chestnut colt, 2016
| Sire Siyouni (FR) 2007 | Pivotal (GB); 1993 | Polar Falcon (USA) | Nureyev |
| Sire Siyouni (FR) 2007 | Pivotal (GB); 1993 | Polar Falcon (USA) | Marie d'Argonne |
| Sire Siyouni (FR) 2007 | Pivotal (GB); 1993 | Fearless Revival | Cozzene |
| Sire Siyouni (FR) 2007 | Pivotal (GB); 1993 | Fearless Revival | Stufida |
| Sire Siyouni (FR) 2007 | Sichilla (IRE); 2002 | Danehill (USA) | Danzig |
| Sire Siyouni (FR) 2007 | Sichilla (IRE); 2002 | Danehill (USA) | Razyana |
| Sire Siyouni (FR) 2007 | Sichilla (IRE); 2002 | Slipstream Queen (USA) | Conquistador Cielo |
| Sire Siyouni (FR) 2007 | Sichilla (IRE); 2002 | Slipstream Queen (USA) | Country Queen |
| Dam Starlet's Sister (IRE) 2009 | Galileo (IRE); 1998 | Sadler's Wells (USA) | Northern Dancer (CAN) |
| Dam Starlet's Sister (IRE) 2009 | Galileo (IRE); 1998 | Sadler's Wells (USA) | Fairy Bridge |
| Dam Starlet's Sister (IRE) 2009 | Galileo (IRE); 1998 | Urban Sea (USA) | Miswaki |
| Dam Starlet's Sister (IRE) 2009 | Galileo (IRE); 1998 | Urban Sea (USA) | Allegretta (GB) |
| Dam Starlet's Sister (IRE) 2009 | Premiere Creation (FR); 1997 | Green Tune (USA) | Green Dancer |
| Dam Starlet's Sister (IRE) 2009 | Premiere Creation (FR); 1997 | Green Tune (USA) | Soundings |
| Dam Starlet's Sister (IRE) 2009 | Premiere Creation (FR); 1997 | Allwaki (USA) | Miswaki |
| Dam Starlet's Sister (IRE) 2009 | Premiere Creation (FR); 1997 | Allwaki (USA) | Alloy (FR) (Family: 16-h) |

- Sottsass is inbred 4 × 4 to Miswaki, meaning that this stallion appears twice in the fourth generation of his pedigree.
