= Siyouni =

Thoroughbred Racehorse

- Racing silks of Aga Khan IV
- Sire: Pivotal
- Grandsire: Polar Falcon
- Dam: Sichilla
- Damsire: Danehill
- Sex: Colt
- Foaled: 14 February 2007
- Country: France
- Colour: Bay
- Breeder: Aga Khan IV
- Owner: Aga Khan IV
- Trainer: Alain de Royer-Dupré
- Record: 12: 4-4-1
- Earnings: £447,798

Major wins
- Prix La Flèche (2009); Prix Jean-Luc Lagardère (2009)

Siyouni (foaled 14 February 2007) is a French bred and French trained Thoroughbred racehorse and sire. In a career which ran from May 2009 to October 2010 he ran twelve times and won four races, including one at the highest Group One level. He showed promise as a juvenile winning four of his six races including the Prix Jean-Luc Lagardère on his final start of the year. The following year he never managed to repeat his juvenile forming finishing a best second place in the Prix Jean Prat, before being retired to stud.

== Background ==
Siyouni, a bay horse standing 16.1 hands high, was bred in France by the Aga Khan IV. Siyouni was sired by the three times Leading broodmare sire in Great Britain and Ireland Pivotal out of Listed winning mare Schilla. the colt was sent into training with Alain de Royer-Dupré in Chantilly.

== Racing career ==
=== 2009: two-year-old season ===
Siyouni made his racecourse debut in a new arrival race over five furlongs with Christophe Soumillon onboard at Longchamp Racecourse on the 4th May, winning by one and half lengths. Twenty-three days later he reappeared in a five furlongs race to win his second race from two starts. Siyouni was stepped up in class on his third start, racing in the Listed Prix La Flèche at Maisons-Laffitte Racecourse he started at odds of 7/10 winning "easily" by 3 lengths. His next race saw him enter into a Group Two race contesting the Prix Robert Papin over 5 1/2 furlongs, although set off odds on favourite Siyouni finished second to Second Duty by 1 1/2 lengths. The fifth race of his juvenile campaign saw Siyouni stepped up in trip to seven furlongs but down in class for the Group Three Prix La Rochette, held up in the rear during the race Siyouni was ridden to second place a furlong out but could find no extra and finished behind the winner by 1 1/2 lengths. On final appearance of 2009 Siyouni contested the Group One Prix Jean-Luc Lagardère this time with Gérald Mossé onboard for the first time, sent off at odds of 7/1 Siyouni took the lead 1 1/2 furlongs from home and won out comfortably by 1 1/2 lengths.

=== 2010: three-year-old season ===
Siyouni began his 2010 three-year-old campaign favourite for the Poule d'Essai des Poulains, he began in a Group Three trial for the French Guineas the Prix De Fontainebleau, finishing second behind his stable mate Rajsaman who was also owned by the Aga Khan IV. On May 16th Siyouni lined up for Poule d'Essai des Poulains going off 2/1 favourite for the race, this time with Christophe Lemaire onboard the colt was held up towards the rear but could never mount a serious challenge finishing a disappointing ninth of fifteen runners. Siyouni was then sent to Royal Ascot to run in the St James's Palace Stakes, he came home fourth to Canford Cliffs by 2 1/4 lengths. Back in France contesting the three-year-old only Prix Jean Prat Siyouni managed his best finish of the year in second place four lengths down to the winner. Taking on older horses for the first time Siyouni tackled the Prix du Moulin de Longchamp and came extremely close to a second Group One win finishing third to Fuisse and Rio De La Plata all finishing within a head of each other. Siyouni's last race of his career would see him run in the Prix de la Forêt ran on France's renowned Arc Weekend, he failed to mount any serious challenge though and finished a lacklustre seventh of ten runners. After this race Siyouni would be retired to stand at stud

== Stud career ==
Siyouni was retired to the Aga Khan IV's Haras de Bonneval stud in France after his 2010 season, initially standing for a fee of €7,000. Over the past eight years Siyouni has established himself as one of the top sires in Europe. Siyouni's first black type winner was Ervedya winning the Prix de Cabourg Group Three also for the Aga Khan IV, she would also go on to be her sire's first Group One winner giving Siyouni a prestigious first three-year-old crop Classic winner. He has gone on to produce six Group One winners, four of which are multiple Group one winners and a further fifty-one stakes winners. His rise in success over recent years has seen his stud fee increase to €20,000 for 2015, €30,000 for 2016, €45,000 for 2017, €75,000 2018, €100,000 for 2019 then to €140,000 in 2021 and 2022, his fee for 2023 was €150,000, then with more success from his son Paddington who went onto win 4 Group One races his 2024 fee was increased to €200,000. His most notable progeny is St Mark's Basilica who won five consecutive Group Ones including the French 2000 Guineas and French Derby along with beating older horses for his last two Group One wins.

=== Notable progeny ===
c = colt, f = filly, g = gelding

Foaled	Name	Sex	Major wins
2012	Ervedya	f	Poule d'Essai des Pouliches, Coronation Stakes, Prix du Moulin de Longchamp
2015	Laurens	f	Fillies' Mile, Prix Saint-Alary, Prix de Diane, Matron Stakes, Sun Chariot Stakes, Prix Rothschild
2016	Etoile	f	E. P. Taylor Stakes
2016	Sottsass	c	Prix du Jockey Club, Prix Ganay, Prix de l'Arc de Triomphe
2017	Dream And Do	f	Poule d'Essai des Pouliches
2018	St Mark's Basilica	c	Dewhurst Stakes, Poule d'Essai des Poulains, Prix du Jockey Club, Eclipse Stakes, Irish Champion Stakes
2019	Amelia's Jewel	f	Northerly Stakes
2020	Mqse de Sevigne	f	Prix Rothschild, Prix Jean Romanet, Prix d'Ispahan
2020	Tahiyra	f	Moyglare Stud Stakes, Irish 1,000 Guineas, Coronation Stakes, Matron Stakes
2020	Paddington	c	Irish 2,000 Guineas, St. James's Palace Stakes, Eclipse Stakes, Sussex Stakes
2022	Zarigana	f	Poule d'Essai des Pouliches

== Pedigree ==
Pedigree of Siyouni (FR), bay colt, 2007
Sire Pivotal (GB) 1993	Polar Falcon (USA); 1987	Nureyev	Northern Dancer (CAN)
Sire Pivotal (GB) 1993	Polar Falcon (USA); 1987	Nureyev	Special
Sire Pivotal (GB) 1993	Polar Falcon (USA); 1987	Marie d'Argonne (FR)	Jefferson (GB)
Sire Pivotal (GB) 1993	Polar Falcon (USA); 1987	Marie d'Argonne (FR)	Mohair
Sire Pivotal (GB) 1993	Fearless Revival; 1987	Cozzene (USA)	Caro (IRE)
Sire Pivotal (GB) 1993	Fearless Revival; 1987	Cozzene (USA)	Ride The Trails
Sire Pivotal (GB) 1993	Fearless Revival; 1987	Stufida	Bustino
Sire Pivotal (GB) 1993	Fearless Revival; 1987	Stufida	Zerbinetta
Dam Sichilla (IRE) 2002	Danehill (USA) b. 1986	Danzig (USA)	Northern Dancer (CAN)
Dam Sichilla (IRE) 2002	Danehill (USA) b. 1986	Danzig (USA)	Pas De Nom (USA)
Dam Sichilla (IRE) 2002	Danehill (USA) b. 1986	Razyana (USA)	His Majesty (USA)
Dam Sichilla (IRE) 2002	Danehill (USA) b. 1986	Razyana (USA)	Spring Adieu
Dam Sichilla (IRE) 2002	Slipstream Queen (USA); 1990	Conquistador Cielo (USA)	Mr. Prospector (USA)
Dam Sichilla (IRE) 2002	Slipstream Queen (USA); 1990	Conquistador Cielo (USA)	K D Princess (USA)
Dam Sichilla (IRE) 2002	Slipstream Queen (USA); 1990	Country Queen (USA)	Explodent (USA)
Dam Sichilla (IRE) 2002	Slipstream Queen (USA); 1990	Country Queen (USA)	Carrie's Rough (USA)

- Siyouni is inbred 4 × 4 to Northern Dancer, meaning that this stallion appears twice in the fourth generation of his pedigree.
