= Mangoustine =

French racehorse

- Sire: Dark Angel
- Grandsire: Acclamation
- Dam: Zotilla
- Damsire: Zamindar
- Sex: Filly
- Foaled: 30 March 2019
- Country: France
- Color: Grey
- Breeder: Ecurie des Monceaux, Lordship Stud & Qatar Bloodstock
- Owner: Infinity Nine Horses, Ecurie des Monceaux, Qatar Bloodstock
- Trainer: Frederic Rossi; Mikel Delzangles
- Record: 5: 4-0-1
- Earnings: £324,722

Major wins
- Criterum de Lyon (2021); Prix Miesque (2021); Poule d'Essai des Pouliches (2022)

Mangoustine (foaled 30 March 2019) is a French Thoroughbred racehorse. As a two-year-old in 2021 she was undefeated in three races including the Listed Criterum de Lyon and the Group 3 Prix Miesque. After sustaining her first defeat when running third on her three-year-old debut she returned to winning form to take the Poule d'Essai des Pouliches.

== Background ==
Mangoustine is a grey (officially "bay") filly bred in France by Ecurie des Monceaux, Lordship Stud & Qatar Bloodstock. In September 2020 the yearling was consigned to the Arqana Deauville Select Sale and was bought for €46,000 by the bloodstock agent David Redvers. The filly was subsequently owned by Ecurie des Monceaux, Qatar Bloodstock and Tony Parker's Infinity Nine Horses. She was sent into training with Frederic Rossi.

She was from the eleventh crop of foals sired by Dark Angel, who won four races including the Mill Reef Stakes and the Middle Park Stakes as a two-year-old in 2007 before being retired to stud at the end of the year. Dark Angel's other offspring have included Lethal Force, Mecca's Angel, Battaash and Harry Angel. Mangoustine's dam Zotilla showed no racing ability, but was a half-sister to Flotilla, who won the Breeders' Cup Juvenile Fillies Turf and the Poule d'Essai des Pouliches. She was descended from Miss Ribot, a mare whose wins included the Santa Ana Stakes in 1969 and who was the female line ancestor of Lethal Force.

== Racing career ==
=== 2021: two-year-old season ===
Mangoustine began her racing career in a maiden race over 1600 metres on good to soft ground at Deauville Racecourse on 22 August. Ridden by Christophe Soumillon she started the 2.4/1 favourite in a ten-runner field and won by half a length from Albea. A month later, with Soumillon again in the saddle, the filly was stepped up in class and matched against male opposition in the Listed Criterium de Lyon over 1600 metres at Lyons Parilly Racecourse. Racing on soft ground she started the 2.8/1 favourite she won by a length from the colt Toimy Son.

For her final run of the year Mangoustine was dropped back in distance but moved up in class to contest the Group 3 Prix Miesque over 1400 metres at Chantilly Racecourse on 26 October. Ridden by Maxime Guyon she started the 2.3/1 second favourite behind the Prix d'Aumale winner Fleur d'Iris in an eight-runner field which also included the Prix Francois Boutin winner Who Knows. Mangoustine led from the start, accelerated 400 metres from the finish and won by one and a quarter lengths from Txope. After the race Frederic Rossi said "I suppose I felt a bit of pressure because we've said publicly we feel she is a Group 1 filly so that meant she needed to win. I wanted to bring her back to 1400 metres and I think 1600 metres will be her limit next season... she was clearly very good when she arrived so we've thought a lot of her since last February. But you could see in the parade ring beforehand she still needs time and she will make a better three-year-old than a two-year-old."

=== 2022: three-year-old season ===
For the 2022 season Mangoustine was transferred to the training stable of Mikel Delzangles after Frederic Rossi was reported to be under investigation on charges of doping. On her first appearance as a three-year-old she was partnered by Gerald Mosse when she started the 4.5/1 second favourite Prix de la Grotte on 17 April at Longchamp Racecourse. After racing in mid-division she stayed on well in the closing stages to finish third behind Rosacea and Daisy Maisy.

On 15 May Mangoustine, with Mosse in the saddle, went off at odds of 10.9/1 for the Group 1 Poule d'Essai des Pouliches over 1600 metres at Longchamp. Rosacea started favourite while the other thirteen contenders included Cachet (winner of the 1000 Guineas), Who Knows, Daisy Maisy, Mqse de Sevigne (Prix Vanteaux), Jumbly (Radley Stakes) and Acer Alley (Prix de la Grotte). Mosse settled the filly behind the leader as Cachet set the pace, before moving up to take the lead 200 metres from the finish. Cachet rallied strongly but Mangoustine kept on well to win by a head, with Times Square a short head away in third. After the race Delzangles said "Everyone knew she was a good filly last year and I thought it was a very good comeback run in the Prix de la Grotte. I gave her a quiet build-up to that race and she came on a lot, although it was still a big ask to win the big one... At the end she was able to show her class. A mile looks like her trip... Logically the Coronation Stakes will be next.

== Pedigree ==
Pedigree of Mangoustine (FR), bay filly, 2019
Sire Dark Angel (IRE) 2005	Acclamation (GB); 1999	Royal Applause	Waajib (IRE)
Sire Dark Angel (IRE) 2005	Acclamation (GB); 1999	Royal Applause	Flying Melody (IRE)
Sire Dark Angel (IRE) 2005	Acclamation (GB); 1999	Princess Athena (IRE)	Ahonoora (GB)
Sire Dark Angel (IRE) 2005	Acclamation (GB); 1999	Princess Athena (IRE)	Shopping Wise
Sire Dark Angel (IRE) 2005	Midnight Angel (GB); 1994	Machiavellian (USA)	Mr Prospector
Sire Dark Angel (IRE) 2005	Midnight Angel (GB); 1994	Machiavellian (USA)	Coup de Folie
Sire Dark Angel (IRE) 2005	Midnight Angel (GB); 1994	Night at Sea	Night Shift (USA)
Sire Dark Angel (IRE) 2005	Midnight Angel (GB); 1994	Night at Sea	Into Harbour
Dam Zotilla (IRE) 2011	Zamindar (USA); 1994	Gone West	Mr Prospector
Dam Zotilla (IRE) 2011	Zamindar (USA); 1994	Gone West	Secrettame
Dam Zotilla (IRE) 2011	Zamindar (USA); 1994	Zaizafon	The Minstrel (CAN)
Dam Zotilla (IRE) 2011	Zamindar (USA); 1994	Zaizafon	Mofida (GB)
Dam Zotilla (IRE) 2011	Louvain (IRE); 2002	Sinndar	Grand Lodge (USA)
Dam Zotilla (IRE) 2011	Louvain (IRE); 2002	Sinndar	Sinntara
Dam Zotilla (IRE) 2011	Louvain (IRE); 2002	Flanders	Common Grounds (GB)
Dam Zotilla (IRE) 2011	Louvain (IRE); 2002	Flanders	Family At War (USA) (Family: 21-a)

- Mangoustine is inbred 4 × 4 to Mr Prospector, meaning that this stallion appears twice in the fourth generation of her pedigree.
