= Prix Miesque =

Flat horse race in France

- Class: Group 3
- Location: Maisons-Laffitte; France
- Inaugurated: 2001
- Race type: Flat / Thoroughbred
- Website: france-galop.com

Race information
- Distance: 1,400 metres (7f)
- Surface: Turf
- Track: Straight
- Qualification: Two-year-old fillies excluding Group 2 winners
- Weight: 56 kg Penalties; 2½ kg if two Group 3 wins 1½ kg if one Group 3 win
- Purse: €80,000 (2019); 1st: €40,000

Prix Miesque
2024
Mimos	Lhakpa	Iron Bird

Previous years
2023
Tamfana	Shady Lady	Monteille
2022
Moon Ray	Lady Mia	Eternal Dance
2021
Mangoustine	Txope	Who Knows

2020-2011
2020
Lullaby Moon	Asterella	Kennella
2019
Dream And Do	Les Hogues	Yomogi
2018
Devant	Stay Classy	So Unique
2017
Sweety Dream	Seaella	Moisson Precoce
2016
Dame Du Roi	Kambura	Thais
2015
Aboulie	Dressed In Fur	Nomadic
2014
Ameenah	Night Of Light	Kenouska
2013
Lacarolina	Xcellence	Artwork Genie
2012
Aquatinta	Show Gorb	Holy Dazzle
2011
Topeka	Barbayam	Tibaldi

2010-2001
2010
Izalia	Gypsy Highway	Angel Of Harlem
2009
Lixirova	Absolute Music	Ercolini
2008
Stefer	Entre Deux Eaux	Aiboa
2007
Modern Look	Lady Deauville	Verba
2006
Magic America	Nuqoosh	Zut Alors
2005
Quiet Royal	Mednaya	Violette
2004
Stella Blue	Mirabilis	Arabian Spell
2003
Dalna	Malaica	La Ina
2002
White Rose	The Wise Lady	Semire
2001
Contemporary	Glia	Urgele

The Prix Miesque is a Group 3 flat horse race in France open to two-year-old thoroughbred fillies. It is run at Chantilly over a distance of 1,400 metres (about 7 furlongs), and it is scheduled to take place each year in late October or early November. The race was run at Maisons-Laffitte until its closure at the end of the 2019 season.

== History ==
The event is named after Miesque, a successful French-trained filly in the late 1980s. It was established in 2001, and the inaugural running was won by Contemporary.

The Prix Miesque replaced the Prix Saint-Roman, a race last staged in 2000. Its predecessor was traditionally contested by juveniles of either gender, but was restricted to fillies in its last three years.

== Records ==
Leading jockey (4 wins):

- Christophe Soumillon – Contemporary (2001), Topeka (2011), Lacarolina (2013), Aboulie (2015)

Leading trainer (3 wins):

- Criquette Head-Maarek – Dalna (2003), Quiet Royal (2005), Magic America (2006)
- David Smaga – Modern Look (2007), Stefer (2008), Lixirova (2009)
- Frédéric Rossi - Izalia (2010), Ameenah (2014), Dream And Do (2019)

Leading owner:

- Jean-Claude Seroul – Izalia (2010), Ameenah (2014)

== Winners ==
Year	Winner	Jockey	Trainer	Owner	Time
2001	Contemporary	Christophe Soumillon	Robert Collet	All. La Nuova Sbarra	1:40.90
2002	White Rose	Waldemar Hickst	Andreas Trybuhl	Stall Primero	1:32.70
2003	Dalna	Olivier Peslier	Criquette Head-Maarek	Ghislaine Head	1:28.10
2004	Stella Blue	Thierry Thulliez	Pascal Bary	Ecurie Stella Maris	1:30.60
2005	Quiet Royal	Olivier Peslier	Criquette Head-Maarek	Wertheimer et Frère	1:26.00
2006	Magic America	Christophe Lemaire	Criquette Head-Maarek	Tony Ryan	1:24.90
2007	Modern Look	Stéphane Pasquier	David Smaga	Khalid Abdullah	1:27.10
2008	Stefer	Dominique Boeuf	David Smaga	Wafic Saïd	1:29.40
2009	Lixirova	Grégory Benoist	David Smaga	Omar Sharif	1:31.80
2010	Izalia	Franck Blondel	Frédéric Rossi	Jean-Claude Seroul	1:29.90
2011	Topeka	Christophe Soumillon	Robert Collet	Gerry Oldham	1:28.90
2012	Aquatinta	Olivier Peslier	Henri-Alex Pantall	Haras de Bernesq	1:32.70
2013	Lacarolina	Christophe Soumillon	Jean-Claude Rouget	Carli / Augustin-Normand	1:31.90
2014	Ameenah	Franck Blondel	Frédéric Rossi	Jean-Claude Seroul	1:30.49
2015	Aboulie	Christophe Soumillon	Jean-Claude Rouget	Haras D'Etreham	1:32.10
2016	Dame Du Roi	Aurelien Lemaitre	Freddy Head	Ades-Hazan & Puerari	1:27.90
2017	Sweety Dream	Grégory Benoist	Pascal Bary	Guy Pariente	1:25.89
2018	Devant	Pierre-Charles Boudot	Henri-Alex Pantall	Team Valor International	1:26.51
2019	Dream And Do	Maxime Guyon	Frédéric Rossi	Haras du Logis Saint Germain	1:30.20
2020	Lullaby Moon	Richard Kingscote	Ralph Beckett	Amo Racing Ltd & Co	1:35.82
2021	Mangoustine	Maxime Guyon	Frederic Rossi	Infinity Nine Horses, Ecurie des Monceaux et al	1:33.17
2022	Moon Ray	Stéphane Pasquier	Nicolas Clément	R T Racing Stable	1:29.24
2023	Tamfana	Mlle Marie Velon	David Menuisier	QLR VIII & Friends	1:32.59
2024	Mimos	Tony Piccone	Nicolas Le Roch	Haras D'Etreham	1:35.22

== See also ==
- List of French flat horse races
