= P. J. McDonald =

Irish jockey

P.J. McDonald
Personal information
- Full name: Patrick Joseph McDonald
- Born: County Wexford, Ireland
- Occupation: Jockey

Horse racing career
- Sport: Horse racing

Major racing wins
- Major races Fillies' Mile (2017); Prix de Diane (2018); Prix Rothschild (2019); King George VI and Queen Elizabeth Stakes (2022)

Significant horses
- Laurens, Pyledriver

Patrick Joseph "P.J." McDonald (born 1982) is a Group One winning Irish jockey and President (Flat) of the Professional Jockeys' Association.

== Career ==
McDonald was born in County Wexford and started to ride ponies as a child at his grandmother's cottage.

Having been taught to ride horses by Dusty Sheehy, McDonald began his career as a jump jockey, with Padge Berry mentoring him as a point-to-point rider. However, he only won 3 out of 70 races in his first four years racing under rules as a rider for trainer Charles O'Brien and considered giving up. He was then persuaded to move to England by an ex-jockey and friend, Michael Cleary, to save his career.

In England, he rode for Ferdy Murphy, for whom he won the Scottish Grand National on Hot Weld in 2007. McDonald credits Murphy for helping his development as a jockey: '[He] gave me the confidence, he gave me the platform and he guided me the right way'. Murphy persuaded McDonald to spend a summer flat racing as a means of keeping fit, although finding he felt healthier for it, he continued under that code, with a caveat that he could return to Murphy if he liked.

Progressing slowly, his first major success as a flat jockey was winning the 2016 Yorkshire Cup on Clever Cookie, deputising for Danny Tudhope who has been injured in a fall the previous day. The following year at York he also won the Lonsdale Cup on Montaly, trained by Andrew Balding. Also in 2017, he won four races on Havana Grey including the National Stakes at Sandown Park and the Molecomb Stakes at Glorious Goodwood.

His most famous connection, however, is with the Karl Burke-trained Laurens who was runner-up in the 2018 1,000 Guineas, before winning two French Group Ones - the Prix Saint-Alary and Prix de Diane. However, after being thrown from a horse in the parade ring at Newcastle, he fractured his heel and ankle, and missed several weeks of the season during which Laurens won two late season Group Ones under Tudhope. Returning to ride Laurens in the Queen Elizabeth II Stakes at Ascot Champions Day, he finished 8th behind Roaring Lion, but would win another Group One, the Prix Rothschild in July 2019.

In July 2022 McDonald picked up a spare ride on 18/1 outsider Pyledriver, trained by William Muir and Chris Grassick, in the Group One King George VI and Queen Elizabeth Stakes at Ascot. Pyledriver's regular jockey, Martin Dwyer was injured and Frankie Dettori, who had ridden him in his previous two starts, was on the more-fancied Emily Upjohn. McDonald had ridden Pyledriver as a two-year-old, winning the Ascendant Stakes. Pyledriver defied his odds to win the Ascot race by nearly three lengths from Torquator Tasso. Since Dwyer had retired, McDonald retained the ride on Pyledriver when he returned to racecourse for the Group 2 Hardwicke Stakes at Royal Ascot on 24 June 2023. Pyledriver won by just over a length and survived a stewards' inquiry, with McDonald receiving a three-day ban for careless riding.

He has been the Professional Jockeys' Association's safety officer in the North since 2010 and in July 2018 was appointed Flat President of the PJA, replacing Steve Drowne.

== Personal life ==
McDonald lives in Leyburn, North Yorkshire and is married to Abby, whom he met at Ferdy Murphy's stables. They have two daughters - Amelia and Lavinia.

== Statistics ==
Flat wins in Great Britain by year

Year	Wins	Runs	Strike rate	Total earnings
2005	0	14	0	£1,853
2006	1	20	5	£7,425
2007	24	265	9	£171,166
2008	38	392	10	£267,906
2009	47	511	9	£302,564
2010	76	647	12	£421,186
2011	57	576	10	£291,140
2012	41	484	8	£317,821
2013	61	565	11	£371,414
2014	54	629	9	£448,605
2015	69	734	9	£674,981
2016	80	812	10	£728,476
2017	128	887	14	£1,853,510
2018	120	892	13	£1,536,655
2019	132	901	15	£1,917,924
2020	72	697	10	£807,159
2021	67	665	10	£900,271
2022	78	602	13	£1,779,700

== Major wins ==
(United Kingdom) Great Britain

- Fillies' Mile - (1) - Laurens (2017)
- British Champions Long Distance Cup - (1) - Mount Atlas (2026)
- King George VI and Queen Elizabeth Stakes - (1) - Pyledriver (2022)

France

- Prix de Diane - (1) - Laurens (2018)
- Prix Rothschild - (1) - Laurens (2019)
- Prix Saint-Alary - (1) - Laurens (2018)
