= Ervedya =

French-bred Thoroughbred racehorse

- Racing silks of Aga Khan IV
- Sire: Siyouni
- Grandsire: Pivotal
- Dam: Elva
- Damsire: King's Best
- Sex: Mare
- Foaled: 13 April 2012
- Country: France
- Colour: Bay
- Breeder: Aga Khan IV
- Owner: Aga Khan IV
- Trainer: Jean-Claude Rouget
- Record: 14: 7-3-3
- Earnings: £977,730

Major wins
- Prix de Cabourg (2014); Prix Imprudence (2015); Poule d'Essai des Pouliches (2015); Coronation Stakes (2015); Prix du Moulin (2015)

Awards
- Top-rated 3-y-o French-trained filly (2015)

Ervedya (foaled 13 April 2012) is a French Thoroughbred racehorse best known for her performances over 1600 metres (one mile). She showed top-class form as a juvenile in 2014 when she won her first three races including the Prix de Cabourg before finishing third in the Prix Morny and second in the Prix Marcel Boussac. In the following year she won the Prix Imprudence and then recorded Group One wins in the Poule d'Essai des Pouliches and the Coronation Stakes. Later that season she added another major victory when she took the Prix du Moulin. In 2016 she failed to win but ran prominently in several major races.

== Background ==
Ervedya is a bay mare with small white star bred in France by her owner Aga Khan IV. She was trained throughout her racing career by Jean-Claude Rouget and ridden in most of her races by Christophe Soumillon.

She was from the first crop of foals sired by the Aga Khan's stallion Siyouni whose biggest win came in the 2009 running of the Prix Jean-Luc Lagardère. His other offspring have included Siyoushake (Prix Perth), Spectre (Prix Imprudence), Volta (Prix de Sandringham), Bourree (Prix de Psyché), Finsbury Square (Prix de Meautry) and Trixia (Prix des Réservoirs). Ervedya's dam Elva, showed good racing ability, winning two minor races and finishing second in the Prix Vanteaux. She was a female-line descendant of the French mare Sanaa (foaled 1931) who was the ancestor of several other major winners including Esmeralda (Prix Morny), Coronation, Danedream, Gentoo (Prix Royal-Oak) and Falco (Poule d'Essai des Poulains).

== Racing career ==
=== 2014: two-year-old season ===
Ervedya made a successful racecourse debut in a maiden race over 1100 metres at Tarbes on 29 May 2014, winning by a neck from Lostinparadise. In June at Maisons-Laffitte Racecourse she started at odds of 1.6/1 for the Prix Pirette over 1200 metres and won by one and a quarter lengths from the odds-on favourite Malicieuse. On 3 August, the filly was stepped up in class for the Group Three Prix de Cabourg over 1200 metres at Deauville Racecourse and started at odds of 6/1 in an eight-runner field. Ridden by Thierry Jarnet she took the lead approaching the last 200 metres and won "comfortably" by two lengths and a nose from the colts City Money and El Suizo. Three weeks later, over the same course and distance, Ervedya started joint-favourite for the Group One Prix Morny. After being restrained by Soumillon in the early stages she finished strongly to take third place behind the colts The Wow Signal (from England) and Hootenanny (from the United States). On her final appearance of the season Ervedya contested the Prix Marcel Boussac over 1600 metres at Longchamp Racecourse on 5 October and started second favourite behind the Irish filly Found. Despite an unfavourable draw on the outside of the twelve-runner she disputed the lead from the start but was overtaken in last 100 metres and beaten two and a half lengths into second place by Found.

=== 2015: three-year-old season ===
Ervedya began her second season in the Group Three Prix Imprudence over 1400 metres on very soft ground at Maisons-Laffitte Racecourse on 2 April and started the 11/8 favourite ahead of the Italian filly Fontenalice (Premio Dormello), Ameenah (Prix Miesque) and Queen Bee (Prix du Calvados). After racing towards the rear of the thirteen runner field she accelerated into the lead 200 metres from the finish and won "comfortably" by one and three quarter lengths from Ameenah. On 10 May Ervedya was stepped back up to Group One class for the Poule d'Essai des Pouliches over 1600 metres at Longchamp and started favourite against thirteen opponents. Ameenah, Queen Bee and Fontenalice were again in the field whilst the other runners included Mexican Gold (Prix de la Grotte) and Sainte Amarante the winner of the Listed Prix la Camargo. Ridden with great confidence by Soumillon, Ervedya raced at the rear of the field before accelerating into the lead in the last 200 metres and winning comfortably by three quarters of a length from the British-trained outsider Irish Rookie. After the race Rouget commented "She has Group 1 acceleration, is easy to train and easy to ride. She didn't get away all that well but that wasn't too serious and Christophe had her nicely hidden away".

On her next appearance, Ervedya was sent to England and started second favourite behind Found in the Coronation Stakes over one mile at Royal Ascot on 19 June. The other seven runners included Lucida (Rockfel Stakes), Arabian Queen, Irish Rookie and Sperry (Michael Seely Memorial Stakes). After being restrained by Soumillon in the early stages, as Arabian Queen set the pace Ervedya began to make rapid progress in the straight. She overtook Found inside the final furlong and won by a neck with Lucida a half length back in third ahead of the outsider Miss Temple City. Explaining his tactics Soumillon said "I knew she had a good turn of foot so I just wanted to try to follow one or two good fillies to bring me to the final furlong. At the entrance to the straight, I saw that Ryan was going very easily on Found and that around her everybody was a bit [tired] and I thought that I’d find a gap. When I came through, she gave me the turn of foot to make it right on the line." Jean-Claude Rouget commented "It was a big dream to come and win a group I here. She's the best; mentally she is fantastic and that makes her the best". On 2 August Ervedya was matched against older fillies and mares for the first time in the Prix Rothschild over 1600 metres at Deauville. She started the odds on favourite but after taking the lead 300 metres from the finish she was overtaken in the closing stages and beaten one and a quarter lengths by the British-trained four-year-old Amazing Maria.

The Group One Prix du Moulin over 1600 metres at Longchamp on 13 September saw Ervedya start odds-on favourite ahead of the Breeders' Cup Mile winner Karakontie. The other four runners were Maimara (Prix de Lieurey), Giuliani (Bayerisches Zuchtrennen), Wild Chief (Meilen-Trophy) and Akatea (Prix Finlande). After racing in second place behind Karakontie, the filly took the lead inside the last 200 metres and stayed on well to win by a length from Akatea. After the race the Aga Khan said "There was a slight moment where I wondered whether the jockey would get there in time as it didn't look as though things were going to open up with the other horse on her outside. I think we will probably keep her in training as a four-year-old, as there is nothing particularly in the programme for her now that looks interesting. She's very sound and healthy, so I see no reason why we shouldn't".

=== 2016: four-year-old season ===
On 1 May at Saint-Cloud Racecourse Ervedya began her third campaign by starting odds-on favourite for the Prix du Muguet and finished second, beaten three and a half lengths by the five-year-old Vadamos. In June she made her second appearance at Royal Ascot and started the 9/2 joint-favourite for the Queen Anne Stakes over one mile. After being held up at the rear of the field she made some progress in the last quarter mile but never looked likely to win and finished fifth behind Tepin, Belardo, Lighting Spear and Toormore. In the Prix Jacques Le Marois over 1600 metres at Deauville in August she came from well off the pace to finish third behind Ribchester and Vadamos with Esoterique and Galileo Gold among the other beaten horses. On her final run of the year Ervedya was sent to England for the Group One Sun Chariot Stakes over one mile at Newmarket Racecourse on 1 October. Ridden by Christophe Lemaire she tracked the leaders before staying on in the closing stages to finish third behind the Irish filly Alice Springs.

== Assessment and awards ==
In the 2015 World's Best Racehorse Rankings Ervedya was given a rating of 115 making her the 205th best racehorse in the world and the ninth-best three-year-old filly. She was also the highest-rated filly of her generation trained in France.

== Pedigree ==
Pedigree of Ervedya (FR), bay mare, 2012
| Sire Siyouni (FR) 2007 | Pivotal (GB); 1993 | Polar Falcon | Nureyev |
| Sire Siyouni (FR) 2007 | Pivotal (GB); 1993 | Polar Falcon | Marie d'Argonne |
| Sire Siyouni (FR) 2007 | Pivotal (GB); 1993 | Fearless Revival | Cozzene |
| Sire Siyouni (FR) 2007 | Pivotal (GB); 1993 | Fearless Revival | Stufida |
| Sire Siyouni (FR) 2007 | Sichilla (IRE); 2002 | Danehill | Danzig |
| Sire Siyouni (FR) 2007 | Sichilla (IRE); 2002 | Danehill | Razyana |
| Sire Siyouni (FR) 2007 | Sichilla (IRE); 2002 | Slipstream Queen | Conquistador Cielo |
| Sire Siyouni (FR) 2007 | Sichilla (IRE); 2002 | Slipstream Queen | Country Queen |
| Dam Elva (IRE) 2004 | King's Best (USA); 1997 | Kingmambo | Mr. Prospector |
| Dam Elva (IRE) 2004 | King's Best (USA); 1997 | Kingmambo | Miesque |
| Dam Elva (IRE) 2004 | King's Best (USA); 1997 | Allegretta | Lombard |
| Dam Elva (IRE) 2004 | King's Best (USA); 1997 | Allegretta | Anatevka |
| Dam Elva (IRE) 2004 | Evora (IRE); 1999 | Marju | Last Tycoon |
| Dam Elva (IRE) 2004 | Evora (IRE); 1999 | Marju | Flame of Tara |
| Dam Elva (IRE) 2004 | Evora (IRE); 1999 | Eviyrna | The Minstrel |
| Dam Elva (IRE) 2004 | Evora (IRE); 1999 | Eviyrna | Euliya (Family: 14) |
