= Prix de Sandringham =

Flat horse race in France

- Class: Group 2
- Location: Chantilly Racecourse; Chantilly, France
- Race type: Flat / Thoroughbred
- Website: france-galop.com

Race information
- Distance: 1,600 metres (1 mile)
- Surface: Turf
- Track: Right-handed
- Qualification: Three-year-old fillies exc. G1 winners this year
- Weight: 56 kg Penalties; 3 kg for Group 1 winners * 2 kg for Group 2 winners * 2 kg if two Group 3 wins * * since September 1 last year
- Purse: €130,000 (2022); 1st: €74,100

Prix de Sandringham
2025
Godspeed	Eponine	Betty Clover

Previous years
2024
Sparkling Plenty	Cetera	Ribaltagaia
2023
Kelina	Sauterne	Paz
2022
Purplepay	Life In Motion	Sicilian Defense
2021
Tahlie	Kennella	See The Rose

2020-2011
2020
Miss Extra	Golden Crown	Like A Charm
2019
Obligate	Pure Zen	Glance
2018
Mission Impassible	Crown Walk	Efaadah
2017
La Sardane	Gold Luck	Senga
2016
Volta	Besotted	Aim To Please
2015
Impassable	La Berma	Night Of Light
2014
Fintry	La Hoguette	Kenzadargent
2013
Peace Burg	Topaze Blanche	Kenhope
2012
Laugh Out Loud	Mashoora	Rock Me Baby
2011
Immortal Verse	Mixed Intention	Peinture Abstraite

2010-2001
2010
Joanna	Kali	Evaporation
2009
Homebound	Reggane	Aria Di Festa
2008
Modern Look	Mousse Au Chocolat	Albisola
2007
All Is Vanity	Majestic Roi	Just Little
2006
Impressionnante	Mostaqeleh	New Girlfriend
2005
Gorella	Toupie	Stormina
2004
Baqah	Miss Mambo	Dolma
2003
Maiden Tower	Acago	Intercontinental
2002
Spring Star	Clerical Error	Sea Of Showers
2001
Banks Hill	Lethals Lady	Lurina

2000-1998
2000
Zarkiya	Penny's Gold	Devon Heights
1999
Ronda	Venize	Palinisa
1998
Pharatta	Soeur Ti	Insight

The Prix de Sandringham is a Group 2 flat horse race in France open to three-year-old thoroughbred fillies. It is run at Chantilly over a distance of 1,600 metres (about 1 mile), and it is scheduled to take place each year in late May or early June.

== History ==
The event was originally called the Prix des Lilas, and it used to be held at Longchamp. During the early part of its history it was contested over 2,000 metres, and it served as a trial for the Prix de Diane. It was cut to its present distance in 1966.

The race was titled the Coupe de Sa Majesté la Reine Elizabeth in 1972, in honour of Queen Elizabeth II, who was attending Longchamp during a state visit to France. It was renamed after Sandringham, the location of the Royal Stud, in 1973.

The Prix de Sandringham was first run at Chantilly in 1977. It returned to Longchamp the following year, and it was transferred more permanently to Chantilly in 1979. For a period it held Group 3 status, and it was promoted to Group 2 level in 2001. It is now staged on the same day as the Prix du Jockey Club.

== Records ==
Leading jockey (3 wins):

- Freddy Head – Opalia (1971), India Song (1980), Alik (1981)
- Cash Asmussen – Action Francaise (1988), Golden Opinion (1989), Once in My Life (1991)
- Thierry Jarnet – Ski Paradise (1993), Lunafairy (1994), Smolensk (1995)
- Olivier Peslier – Banks Hill (2001), Impressionnante (2006), Immortal Verse (2011)

Leading trainer (9 wins):

- André Fabre – Fitzwilliam Place (1987), Action Francaise (1988), Golden Opinion (1989), Marble Maiden (1992), Ski Paradise (1993), Lunafairy (1994), Smolensk (1995), Banks Hill (2001), Fintry (2014)

Leading owner (4 wins):

- Sheikh Mohammed – Golden Opinion (1989), Marble Maiden (1992), Sensation (1996), Maiden Tower (2003)

== Winners since 1979 ==
Year	Winner	Jockey	Trainer	Owner	Time
1979	Cenerentola	Maurice Philipperon	John Cunnington, Jr.	Sir Michael Sobell
1980	India Song	Freddy Head	François Mathet	Pierre Bensussan
1981	Alik	Freddy Head	Alec Head	Jacques Wertheimer
1982	Parannda	Henri Samani	François Mathet	HH Aga Khan IV
1983	Chamisene	Gérard Dubroeucq	Mitri Saliba	Mahmoud Fustok
1984	Blue Bell Pearl	Maurice Philipperon	John Cunnington, Jr.	Paul de Moussac
1985	Kozana	Alain Lequeux	Alain de Royer-Dupré	HH Aga Khan IV
1986	Only Star	Gary W. Moore	Criquette Head	Robert Sangster
1987	Fitzwilliam Place	Pat Eddery	André Fabre	Paul Nataf
1988	Action Francaise	Cash Asmussen	André Fabre	Daniel Wildenstein	1:41.9
1989	Golden Opinion	Cash Asmussen	André Fabre	Sheikh Mohammed	1:39.8
1990	Gaelic Bird	William Mongil	François Doumen	Michael Smurfit	1:35.6
1991	Once in My Life	Cash Asmussen	Robert Collet	Richard C. Strauss	1:36.0
1992	Marble Maiden	Steve Cauthen	André Fabre	Sheikh Mohammed	1:39.5
1993	Ski Paradise	Thierry Jarnet	André Fabre	Zenya Yoshida	1:36.9
1994	Lunafairy	Thierry Jarnet	André Fabre	Jean-Luc Lagardère	1:43.4
1995	Smolensk	Thierry Jarnet	André Fabre	Mrs Paul de Moussac	1:45.5
1996	Sensation	Frankie Dettori	Criquette Head	Sheikh Mohammed	1:37.7
1997	Orford Ness	Sylvain Guillot	Pascal Bary	Khalid Abdullah	1:39.4
1998	Pharatta	Dominique Boeuf	Carlos Laffon-Parias	Dario Hinojosa	1:39.3
1999	Ronda	Gérald Mossé	Carlos Laffon-Parias	Dario Hinojosa	1:42.4
2000	Zarkiya	Gérald Mossé	Alain de Royer-Dupré	HH Aga Khan IV	1:41.7
2001	Banks Hill	Olivier Peslier	André Fabre	Khalid Abdullah	1:36.2
2002	Spring Star	Christophe Soumillon	Carlos Laffon-Parias	Wertheimer et Frère	1:37.5
2003	Maiden Tower	Frankie Dettori	Henri-Alex Pantall	Sheikh Mohammed	1:35.1
2004	Baqah	Davy Bonilla	Freddy Head	Hamdan Al Maktoum	1:35.8
2005	Gorella	Thierry Thulliez	Jean de Roualle	Pierre de Roualle	1:36.2
2006	Impressionnante	Olivier Peslier	Carlos Laffon-Parias	Wertheimer et Frère	1:35.6
2007	All Is Vanity	Franck Blondel	William Cargeeg	Isabelle Corbani	1:37.8
2008	Modern Look	Stéphane Pasquier	David Smaga	Khalid Abdullah	1:38.5
2009	Homebound	Christophe Lemaire	Jean-Claude Rouget	Joseph Allen	1:38.1
2010	Joanna	Christophe Soumillon	Jean-Claude Rouget	Hamdan Al Maktoum	1:38.7
2011	Immortal Verse	Olivier Peslier	Robert Collet	Richard C. Strauss	1:39.2
2012	Laugh Out Loud	William Buick	Mick Channon	A Black/Al Qatami/Al Mudhaf	1:39.2
2013	Peace Burg	Christophe Soumillon	Jean-Claude Rouget	Cuadra Montalban & Ecurie D	1:40.57
2014	Fintry	Maxime Guyon	André Fabre	Godolphin SNC	1:35.16
2015	Impassable	Maxime Guyon	Carlos Laffon-Parias	Wertheimer et Frère	1:37.58
2016	Volta	Pierre-Charles Boudot	Francis-Henri Graffard	Ecurie David Salabi	1:39.00
2017	La Sardane	Franck Blondel	Bruno de Montzey	Team Valor International	1:39.79
2018	Mission Impassible	Cristian Demuro	Jean-Claude Rouget	Mohamed Fahad Al-Attiyah	1:37.72
2019	Obligate	Pierre-Charles Boudot	Pascal Bary	Khalid ibn Abdullah	1:34.59
2020	Miss Extra	Maxime Guyon	P & J Brandt	Alain Jathiere	1:41.11
2021	Tahlie	Christophe Soumillon	Pascal Bary	Ecurie Jean-Louis Bouchard & Gerard Augustin-Normand	1:40.82
2022	Purplepay	Tom Marquand	William Haggas	Lael Stable	1:37.25
2023	Kelina	Maxime Guyon	Carlos Laffon-Parias	Wertheimer et Frère	1:35.54
2024	Sparkling Plenty	Cristian Demuro	Patrice Cottier	Jean-Pierre-Joseph Dubois	1:40.05
2025	Godspeed	Christophe Soumillon	Carlos and Yann Lerner	Peter R Bradley III, F & O Hinderze Rcing, Ecurie Jml Racing	1:35.07
2026	Naomis	Tony Piccone	Henri-Alex Pantall	Henri-Alex Pantall	1:36:85

== Earlier winners ==
- 1967: Ancyre
- 1971: Opalia
- 1972: Arosa
- 1973: Panpryl
- 1974: Insistance
- 1975: Hamada
- 1976: Guichet
- 1977: River Dane
- 1978: Calderina

== See also ==
- List of French flat horse races
