= Laurens (horse) =

Thoroughbred racehorse trained in Britain

- Racing silks of Mr John Dance
- Sire: Siyouni
- Grandsire: Pivotal
- Dam: Recambe
- Damsire: Cape Cross
- Sex: Filly
- Foaled: 12 April 2015
- Country: France
- Colour: Bay
- Breeder: Bloodstock Agency Ltd
- Owner: John Dance
- Trainer: Karl Burke
- Record: 17: 8-4-0
- Earnings: £1,765,488

Major wins
- May Hill Stakes (2017); Fillies' Mile (2017); Prix Saint-Alary (2018); Prix de Diane (2018); Matron Stakes (2018); Sun Chariot Stakes (2018); Prix Rothschild (2019)

Awards
- Yorkshire Horse of the Year (2018)

Laurens (foaled 12 April 2015) is a French-bred British-trained Thoroughbred racehorse. In a career from July 2017 to October 2019 she ran 17 times, winning eight races, including six at the highest Group 1 level. In 2017 she won a minor event on her racecourse debut and then finished second to Polydream in the Prix du Calvados before her victories in the May Hill Stakes and Fillies' Mile. In the following year she ran second to Billesdon Brook in the 1000 Guineas and then embarked on a successful campaign in her native France, taking both the Prix Saint-Alary and the Prix de Diane. When tried over one and a half miles she failed to stay the distance in the Yorkshire Oaks but when brought back to one mile she upset Alpha Centauri in the Matron Stakes and then added a fifth Group 1 success when taking the Sun Chariot Stakes. In 2019 she continued to compete at the highest level, adding a further Group 1 win in France in the Prix Rothschild before being retired at the end of the season.

== Background ==
Laurens is a big bay filly bred in France by Bloodstock Agency Ltd. She has a white star and snip as well as white socks on her left foreleg and right hind leg. In August 2016 at Goffs the yearling filly was offered for sale and bought for £220,000 by Salcey Forest Stud on behalf of John Dance. She was sent into training with Karl Burke at Middleham Moor in North Yorkshire. She was ridden in most of her races by the former National Hunt jockey P. J. McDonald.

She was from the fourth crop of foals sired by the Aga Khan's stallion Siyouni whose biggest win came in the 2009 running of the Prix Jean-Luc Lagardère. His other offspring have included Ervedya, Le Brivido (Jersey Stakes), Siyoushake (Prix Perth), Spectre (Prix Imprudence), Volta (Prix de Sandringham), Bourree (Prix de Psyché), Finsbury Square (Prix de Meautry) and Trixia (Prix des Réservoirs). Her dam Recambe showed no discernable racing ability, finishing unplaced in her five races but was a half sister to the Newmarket Stakes and Hong Kong Derby winner Salford Mill (aka Helene Mascot). She was descended from the British broodmare Rose Ness (foaled 1965) who was the female-line ancestor of Daylami and Dalakhani.

== Racing career ==
=== 2017: two-year-old season ===
Laurens made her debut in a maiden race over seven furlongs at Doncaster Racecourse on 20 July in which she started at odds of 9/2 and won by a neck from Exhort. The filly was then sent to France and stepped up in class to contest the Prix du Calvados over 1400 metres at Deauville Racecourse a month later and finished second of the eleven runners, beaten one and three quarter lengths by the winner Polydream. On 14 September she started the 11/4 favourite for the May Hill Stakes over one mile at Doncaster, with the best of her opponents appearing to be Billesdon Brook, Nyaleti (winner of the Princess Margaret Stakes) and Tajaanus (Sweet Solera Stakes). After tracking the leaders, Laurens stayed on strongly in the closing stages and won in a "blanket finish" from Dark Rose Angel, Nyaleti and the Aidan O'Brien-trained Sizzling.

A month later the filly was stepped up to Group 1 class for the Fillies' Mile at Newmarket Racecourse and stated at odds of 10/1 in an eleven-runner field. The Debutante Stakes winner Magical started favourite while the other fancied runners included September (Chesham Stakes), Efaadah, Nyaleti and Godolphin's Magic Lily. Laurens took an early lead, responded well when coming under pressure a furlong out, and held on to win by a nose from September. Her trainer Karl Burke said "We always knew she would be a galloper rather than a speed horse at this stage of her career but, when we step up in distance next year, she's going to be very good. She was a beautiful, classy-looking yearling and she has this fantastic action. She's a bit like a ballerina and very light on her feet for a big filly and we’ve never had her off the bridle at home. I think the ideal race for her would be the Prix de Diane."

In the official European Classification for 2017, Laurens was rated the fourth-best two-year-old filly of the season, behind Clemmie, Wild Illusion and Happily.

=== 2018: three-year-old season ===
On her three-year-old debut, Laurens started the 7/1 third choice in the betting for the 1000 Guineas over the Rowley Mile at Newmarket Racecourse on 6 May. She went to the front at halfway but was overtaken approaching the final furlong and beaten into second place by the 66/1 outsider Billesdon Brook. She was then sent to France for the Prix Saint-Alary over 2000 metres at Longchamp Racecourse three weeks later and started the 7/10 favourite with the best of her opponents appearing to be the Prix des Réservoirs winner With You. After leading for most of the way she was overtaken by Flowrider on the outside and With You on the inside but rallied strongly to regain the advantage in the last 100 metres and defeated With You by a short head. Karl Burke explained "we wanted to keep her relaxed and we probably overdid it. PJ said she was asleep the whole way round and, if he had been beaten, he said he would've been kicking himself for not getting after her earlier".

On 17 June, Laurens was back in France for the Prix de Diane over 2100 metres at Chantilly Racecourse. The Aga Khan's Shahnaza started favourite ahead of With You, Luminate (Prix Penelope) and Happily, with Laurens fifth in the betting on 7.6/1. After tracking the leader Luminate, she went to the front in the straight but was quickly faced by several fast-finishing challengers. Half a length covered the first five finishers as Laurens held on gamely and prevailed from Musis Amica, Homerique, Happily and With You. Her owner John Dance commented She's a superstar... When we bought the filly this was the race we talked about, literally the day we bought her, so to actually come here and win it, it's incredible. She's French-bred and she obviously loves France and coming back home".

For her next race Laurens was stepped up in distance for the Yorkshire Oaks over one and a half miles (2,400 metres) at York Racecourse on 23 August. She appeared to be going well in the straight, but tired in the last quarter mile and came home sixth, eight lengths behind the winner Sea of Class. The filly was dropped back to one mile for the Matron Stakes at Leopardstown Racecourse on 15 September in which Danny Tudhope substituted for the injured McDonald. Alpha Centauri was made the 30/100 favourite after four consecutive Group 1 wins with Laurens starting on 10/1. The best fancied of the other five fillies were a trio from the Aidan O'Brien stable comprising Happily, Clemmie and Magical. Laurens took the lead from the start and was never headed, staying on well under strong pressure to win by three quarters of a length from the favourite, with Clemmie a length and a quarter back in third. Karl Burke commented "It's probably the highlight of my career so far. My family are from here, so it's a big thing to come back to Ireland and win a Group 1. She has proved herself a very high-class filly". John Dance said that he felt that the filly had not been given credit for her previous victories and added "It just niggled, because I thought people were underestimating her again, so to come and prove it is great."

On 6 October Laurens started the 11/4 favourite for the Sun Chariot Stakes over one mile at Newmarket against eight opponents including Wind Chimes (Prix de Lieurey), Happily, Clemmie, Veracious (Atalanta Stakes) and Billesdon Brook. After taking the lead before half-way Laurens got the better of a sustained struggle with Happily to win by a head with two and a half length back to the 25/1 outsider Altyn Orda in third place. Tudhope said "She was a bit fresh today, and I was practically just a passenger for the first part of the race. She's got some stride on her. I just wanted to let her go and enjoy herself, and the line came just in time. It wasn’t easy, but we got there. I was starting to worry I had too much underneath me in the first half of the race, but when the second horse came to me, she went again. She's a very tough filly".

After her owner paid a supplementary entry fee of £70,000 Laurens was matched against male opposition for the first time in the Queen Elizabeth II Stakes at Ascot Racecourse on 20 October. With McDonald back in the saddle she briefly took the lead two furlongs out but tired in the closing stages and came home eighth of the thirteen runners behind Roaring Lion. Dance said that the contest was "one race too many" for the season but added that Laurens would probably stay in training as a four-year-old.

In December Laurens was named Yorkshire Horse of the Year for 2018.

=== 2019: four-year-old season ===
McDonald rode Laurens in all of her 2019 starts. The filly began her third campaign in the Group 1 Lockinge Stakes over one mile at Newbury Racecourse on 19 May and was made the 5/1 joint favourite with Beat The Bank in a fourteen-runner field. She was among the leaders from the start and went to the front in the last quarter mile but was overtaken inside the final furlong and was beaten two and a half lengths into second place by the six-year-old gelding Mustashry. A month later the filly started at odds of 11/2 for the Queen Anne Stakes at Royal Ascot in which she took the lead two furlongs out but was outpaced in the closing stages and finished sixth behind Lord Glitters. On 28 August Laurens was sent to France for the Prix Rothschild over 1600 metres at Deauville Racecourse and started the 1.8/1 favourite in a nine-runner field which included Move Swiftly (Duke of Cambridge Stakes), Obligate (Prix de Sandringham), With You (winner of the race in 2018), East (Prix Thomas Bryon), Qabala (Nell Gwyn Stakes) and Beshaayir (Lanwades Stud Stakes). Laurens disputed the lead from the start before gaining a clear advantage at half way and stayed on "gamely" in the closing stages to win by half a length from With You. After the race Burke said "People were calling whether we should have kept her in training, including John really: he was having second thoughts and thought he'd made the wrong decision. But she's a high-class filly and still showed us at home that she had plenty of ability".

Laurens was dropped back to seven furlongs for the Group 2 City of York Stakes on 24 August for which she started 2/1 favourite but failed by a nose to overhaul the front-running three-year-old colt Shine So Bright. In September at Leopardstown she attempted to repeat her 2018 success in the Matron Stakes. She led for most of the way but was overtaken inside the last quarter mile and weakened in the closing stages to come home fourth behind Iridessa, Hermosa and Just Wonderful. She ended her track career in the Sun Chariot Stakes on 5 October when she finished seventh of the nine runners behind Billesdon Brook.

== Pedigree ==
Pedigree of Laurens (FR), bay mare, 2015
Sire Siyouni (FR) 2007	Pivotal (GB); 1993	Polar Falcon (US)	Nureyev
Sire Siyouni (FR) 2007	Pivotal (GB); 1993	Polar Falcon (US)	Marie d'Argonne
Sire Siyouni (FR) 2007	Pivotal (GB); 1993	Fearless Revival	Cozzene
Sire Siyouni (FR) 2007	Pivotal (GB); 1993	Fearless Revival	Stufida
Sire Siyouni (FR) 2007	Sichilla (IRE); 2002	Danehill (US)	Danzig
Sire Siyouni (FR) 2007	Sichilla (IRE); 2002	Danehill (US)	Razyana
Sire Siyouni (FR) 2007	Sichilla (IRE); 2002	Slipstream Queen (US)	Conquistador Cielo
Sire Siyouni (FR) 2007	Sichilla (IRE); 2002	Slipstream Queen (US)	Country Queen
Dam Recambe (IRE) 2005	Cape Cross (IRE); 1994	Green Desert (US)	Danzig
Dam Recambe (IRE) 2005	Cape Cross (IRE); 1994	Green Desert (US)	Foreign Courier
Dam Recambe (IRE) 2005	Cape Cross (IRE); 1994	Park Appeal	Ahonoora (GB)
Dam Recambe (IRE) 2005	Cape Cross (IRE); 1994	Park Appeal	Balidaress
Dam Recambe (IRE) 2005	Raana (IRE); 1992	Kahyasi	Ile de Bourbon (US)
Dam Recambe (IRE) 2005	Raana (IRE); 1992	Kahyasi	Kadissya (US)
Dam Recambe (IRE) 2005	Raana (IRE); 1992	Raysiya (GB)	Cure The Blues (US)
Dam Recambe (IRE) 2005	Raana (IRE); 1992	Raysiya (GB)	Rilasa (FR) (Family: 9-e)

- Laurens is inbred 4 × 4 to Danzig, meaning that this stallion appears twice in the fourth generation of her pedigree.
