= Poule d'Essai des Pouliches =

Flat horse race in France

Poule d'Essai des Pouliches (French 1000 Guineas)
- Class: Group 1
- Location: Longchamp Racecourse; Paris, France
- Inaugurated: 1883
- Race type: Flat / Thoroughbred
- Website: france-galop.com

Race information
- Distance: 1,600 metres (1 mile)
- Surface: Turf
- Track: Right-handed
- Qualification: Three-year-old fillies
- Weight: 57 kg
- Purse: €500,000 (2022); 1st: €285,700

Poule d'Essai des Pouliches
2026
Diamond Necklace	The Last Dance	Green Spirit

Previous years
2025
Zarigana	Shes Perfect	Mandanaba
2024
Rouhiya	Kathmandu	Vespertilio
2022
Mangoustine	Cachet	Times Square
2021
Coeursamba	Mother Earth	Kennella

2020-2011
2020
Dream And Do	Speak Of The Devil	Mageva
2019
Castle Lady	Commes	East
2018
Teppal	Coeur De Beaute	Wind Chimes
2017
Precieuse	Sea Of Grace	Heuristique
2016
La Cressonniere	Nathra	Qemah
2015
Ervedya	Irish Rookie	Mexican Gold
2014
Avenir Certain	Veda	Xcellence
2013
Flotilla	Esoterique	Tasaday
2012
Beauty Parlour	Up	Topeka
2011
Golden Lilac	Glorious Sight	Wild Wind

2010–2001
2010
Special Duty	Baine	Joanna
2009
Elusive Wave	Tamazirte	Fantasia
2008
Zarkava	Goldikova	Halfway To Heaven
2007
Darjina	Finsceal Beo	Rahiyah
2006
Tie Black	Impressionnante	Price Tag
2005
Divine Proportions	Toupie	Ysoldina
2004
Torrestrella	Grey Lilas	Miss Mambo
2003
Musical Chimes	Maiden Tower	Etoile Montante
2002
Zenda	Firth Of Lorne	Sophisticat
2001
Rose Gypsy	Banks Hill	Lethals Lady

2000–1991
2000
Bluemamba	Peony	Alshakr
1999
Valentine Waltz	Karmifira	Calando
1998
Zalaiyka	Cortona	La Nuit Rose
1997
Always Loyal	Seebe	Red Camellia
1996
Ta Rib	Shake The Yoke	Sagar Pride
1995
Matiara	Carling	Shaanxi
1994
East Of The Moon	Agathe	Belle Argentine
1993
Madeleine's Dream	Ski Paradise	Gold Splash
1992
Culture Vulture	Hydro Calido	Guislaine
1991
Danseuse Du Soir	Sha Tha	Caerlina

1990-1982
1990
Houseproud	Pont-Aven	Gharam
1989
Pearl Bracelet	Pass The Peace	Golden Opinion
1988
Ravinella	Duckling Park	Sacre Look
1987
Miesque	Sakura Reiko	Libertine
1986
Baiser Vole	Secret Form	River Dancer
1985
Silvermine	Top Socialite	New Bruce
1984
Masarika	Boreale	Speedy Girl
1983
L'Attrayante	Mysterieuse Etoile	Maximova
1982
River Lady	Typhoon Polly	Vidor

The Poule d'Essai des Pouliches is a Group 1 flat horse race in France open to three-year-old thoroughbred fillies. It is run over a distance of 1,600 metres (about 1 mile) at Longchamp in May. It is France's equivalent of the 1000 Guineas run in Britain.

== History ==
=== Origins ===
The Poule d'Essai, an event for three-year-old colts and fillies, was established in France in 1840. It was inspired by two races in England, the 2000 Guineas (for colts and fillies) and the 1,000 Guineas (for fillies only).

The race was initially staged at the Champ de Mars. Its first running was over one full circuit of the track (about 2,000 metres). It was cut to a three-quarter lap (1,500 metres) in 1841. It was cancelled due to insufficient entries in 1843 and 1844.

The Poule d'Essai was transferred to Longchamp in 1857. It was extended to 1,600 metres in 1867. It was abandoned because of the Franco-Prussian War in 1871. It continued to be run until 1882.

=== Modern version ===
The modern Poule d'Essai des Pouliches was created in 1883, when the Poule d'Essai was divided into two separate races. The "Pouliches" was restricted to fillies, and the Poule d'Essai des Poulains was reserved for colts.

The events were cancelled throughout World War I, with no runnings from 1915 to 1918. There were two 1,800-metre replacement races at Chantilly in 1917. The version for fillies was called the Critérium d'Essai des Pouliches.

The "Pouliches" and "Poulains" were not run in the spring of 1940, but a substitute combining both races took place at Auteuil in October. Titled the Prix d'Essai, it was won by the colt Djebel.

The Poule d'Essai des Pouliches was held at Le Tremblay in 1943, and Maisons-Laffitte in 1944 and 1945.

The present race grading system was introduced in 1971, and the event was given Group 1 status. It was switched from Longchamp's middle course (moyenne piste) to the main course (grande piste) in 1987.

The leading horses from the Poule d'Essai des Pouliches sometimes go on to compete in the Prix de Diane. Twenty-nine fillies have won both races. The most recent was Diamond Necklace in 2026.

== Records ==
Leading jockey (8 wins):

- Freddy Head – Ivanjica (1975), Riverqueen (1976), Dancing Maid (1978), Three Troikas (1979), Silvermine (1985), Miesque (1987), Matiara (1995), Always Loyal (1997)

Leading trainer (7 wins):

- Charles Semblat – Esmeralda (1942), Caravelle (1943), Palencia (1944), Corteira (1948), Coronation / Galgala (1949), Corejada (1950), Djelfa (1951)
- Criquette Head-Maarek – Three Troikas (1979), Silvermine (1985), Baiser Vole (1986), Ravinella (1988), Matiara (1995), Always Loyal (1997), Special Duty (2010)

Leading owner (8 wins):

- Marcel Boussac – Esmeralda (1942), Caravelle (1943), Palencia (1944), Corteira (1948), Coronation / Galgala (1949), Corejada (1950), Djelfa (1951), Apollonia (1956)

== Winners since 1970 ==
Year	Winner	Jockey	Trainer	Owner	Time
1970	Pampered Miss	Maurice Philipperon	John Cunnington Jr.	Nelson Bunker Hunt	1:40.60
1971	Bold Fascinator	Bill Williamson	John Fellows	Wendell Rosso	1:39.70
1972	Mata Hari	Jean Cruguet	Angel Penna	Countess Batthyany	1:44.70
1973	Allez France	Yves Saint-Martin	Albert Klimscha	Daniel Wildenstein	1:44.60
1974	Dumka	Alain Lequeux	Jacques de Chevigny	C. Bauer	1:47.50
1975	Ivanjica	Freddy Head	Alec Head	Jacques Wertheimer	1:38.40
1976	Riverqueen	Freddy Head	Christian Datessen	Ghislaine Head	1:38.60
1977	Madelia	Yves Saint-Martin	Angel Penna	Daniel Wildenstein	1:39.90
1978	Dancing Maid	Freddy Head	Alec Head	Jacques Wertheimer	1:45.30
1979	Three Troikas	Freddy Head	Criquette Head	Ghislaine Head	1:46.00
1980	Aryenne	Maurice Philipperon	John Fellows	D. G. Volkert	1:43.60
1981	Ukraine Girl	Pat Eddery	Robert Collet	Meg Mullion	1:41.00
1982	River Lady	Lester Piggott	François Boutin	Robert Sangster	1:39.60
1983	L'Attrayante	Alain Badel	Olivier Douieb	Mrs Charles Thériot	1:42.50
1984	Masarika	Yves Saint-Martin	Alain de Royer-Dupré	Aga Khan IV	1:39.30
1985	Silvermine	Freddy Head	Criquette Head	Ghislaine Head	1:40.70
1986	Baiser Vole	Guy Guignard	Criquette Head	Robert Sangster	1:39.90
1987	Miesque	Freddy Head	François Boutin	Stavros Niarchos	1:38.10
1988	Ravinella	Gary W. Moore	Criquette Head	Ecurie Åland	1:38.30
1989	Pearl Bracelet	Alfred Gibert	Roger Wojtowiez	Ecurie Fustok	1:37.10
1990	Houseproud	Pat Eddery	André Fabre	Khalid Abdullah	1:38.50
1991	Danseuse du Soir	Dominique Boeuf	Élie Lellouche	Daniel Wildenstein	1:38.60
1992	Culture Vulture	Richard Quinn	Paul Cole	Chris Wright	1:37.00
1993	Madeleine's Dream	Cash Asmussen	François Boutin	Allen Paulson	1:36.40
1994	East of the Moon	Cash Asmussen	François Boutin	Stavros Niarchos	1:37.10
1995	Matiara	Freddy Head	Criquette Head	Ecurie Åland	1:42.40
1996	Ta Rib	Willie Carson	Ed Dunlop	Hamdan Al Maktoum	1:38.70
1997	Always Loyal	Freddy Head	Criquette Head	Maktoum Al Maktoum	1:40.20
1998	Zalaiyka	Gérald Mossé	Alain de Royer-Dupré	Aga Khan IV	1:35.70
1999	Valentine Waltz	Ray Cochrane	John Gosden	Kirby Maher Syndicate	1:36.00
2000	Bluemamba	Thierry Jarnet	Pascal Bary	Ecurie Skymarc Farm	1:40.20
2001	Rose Gypsy	Michael Kinane	Aidan O'Brien	Magnier / Tabor	1:36.70
2002	Zenda	Richard Hughes	John Gosden	Khalid Abdullah	1:37.00
2003	Musical Chimes	Christophe Soumillon	André Fabre	Maktoum Al Maktoum	1:36.00
2004	Torrestrella	Olivier Peslier	François Rohaut	Bernard Bargues	1:35.70
2005	Divine Proportions	Christophe Lemaire	Pascal Bary	Niarchos Family	1:38.50
2006	Tie Black ^{[a]}	Jean-Bernard Eyquem	François Rohaut	Javier Gispert	1:36.60
2007	Darjina	Christophe Soumillon	Alain de Royer-Dupré	Zahra Aga Khan	1:37.20
2008	Zarkava	Christophe Soumillon	Alain de Royer-Dupré	Aga Khan IV	1:35.20
2009	Elusive Wave	Christophe Lemaire	Jean-Claude Rouget	Martin Schwartz	1:36.87
2010	Special Duty ^{[b]}	Stéphane Pasquier	Criquette Head-Maarek	Khalid Abdullah	1:37.40
2011	Golden Lilac	Olivier Peslier	André Fabre	Gestüt Ammerland	1:39.31
2012	Beauty Parlour	Christophe Soumillon	Élie Lellouche	Ecurie Wildenstein	1:37.15
2013	Flotilla	Christophe Lemaire	Mikel Delzangles	Mohammed bin Khalifa Al Thani	1:34.77
2014	Avenir Certain	Grégory Benoist	Jean-Claude Rouget	Caro / Augustin-Normand	1:39.95
2015	Ervedya	Christophe Soumillon	Jean-Claude Rouget	Aga Khan IV	1:36.48
2016	La Cressonniere^{[a]}	Cristian Demuro	Jean-Claude Rouget	Caro / Augustin-Normand	1:36.00
2017	Precieuse^{[a]}	Olivier Peslier	Fabrice Chappet	Anne-Marie Hayes	1:37.69
2018	Teppal	Olivier Peslier	David Simcock	Mohammed bin Khalifa Al Thani	1:37.97
2019	Castle Lady	Mickael Barzalona	Henri-Alex Pantall	Godolphin	1:40.91
2020	Dream And Do^{[d]}	Maxime Guyon	Frederic Rossi	Haras du Logis Saint Germain	1:35.68
2021	Coeursamba	Cristian Demuro	Jean-Claude Rouget	Abdullah bin Fahad Al Attiyah	1:39.28
2022	Mangoustine	Gérald Mossé	Mikel Delzangles	Infinity Nine Horses, Ecurie Des Monceaux et al.	1:35.72
2023	Blue Rose Cen	Aurélien Lemaitre	Christopher Head	Yeguada Centurion SL	1:38.24
2024	Rouhiya	Maxime Guyon	Francis-Henri Graffard	Aga Khan IV	1:35.99
2025	Zarigana ^{[e]}	Mickael Barzalona	Francis-Henri Graffard	Aga Khan Studs SCEA	1:34.05
2026	Diamond Necklace	Ryan Moore	Aidan O'Brien	Westerberg/Tabor / Smith / Magnier	1:40:73

^{a} Price Tag finished first in 2006, but she was relegated to third place following a stewards' inquiry.
^{b} Liliside was first in 2010, but she was placed sixth after a stewards' inquiry.
^{c} The 2016 and 2017 races took place at Deauville while Longchamp was closed for redevelopment.
^{d} The 2020 running took place at Deauville on 1 June as Longchamp was closed owing to the COVID-19 pandemic.
^{e} Shes Perfect finished first in 2025, but she was relegated to second place following a stewards' inquiry.

== Earlier winners ==
- 1883: Stockholm
- 1884: Yvrande
- 1885: Barberine
- 1886: Sakountala
- 1887: Tenebreuse
- 1888: Widgeon
- 1889: May Pole
- 1890: Wandora
- 1891: Primrose
- 1892: Kairouan
- 1893: Tilly
- 1894: Calceolaire
- 1895: Andree
- 1896: Riposte
- 1897: Roxelane
- 1898: Polymnie
- 1899: Sesara
- 1900: Semendria
- 1901: La Camargo
- 1902: Kizil Kourgan
- 1903: Rose de Mai
- 1904: Xylene
- 1905: Princesse Lointaine
- 1906: Sais
- 1907: Madree
- 1908: Sauge Pourpree
- 1909: Ronde de Nuit
- 1910: Vellica
- 1911: Bolide
- 1912: Porte Maillot
- 1913: Banshee
- 1914: Diavolezza
- 1915–18: no race
- 1919: Galejade
- 1920: Flowershop
- 1921: Nephthys
- 1922: Frisky
- 1923: Anna Bolena
- 1924: Rebia
- 1925: La Dame de Trefle
- 1926: Mackwiller
- 1927: Fairy Legend
- 1928: Roahouga
- 1929: Poesie
- 1930: Rose The
- 1931: Pearl Cap
- 1932: Ligne de Fond
- 1933: Bipearl
- 1934: Mary Tudor
- 1935: The Nile
- 1936: Blue Bear
- 1937: Colette Baudoche
- 1938: Feerie
- 1939: Yonne
- 1940: no race
- 1941: Longthanh
- 1942: Esmeralda
- 1943: Caravelle
- 1944: Palencia
- 1945: Nikellora
- 1946: Real
- 1947: Imprudence
- 1948: Corteira
- 1949: Coronation / Galgala *
- 1950: Corejada
- 1951: Djelfa
- 1952: Pomare
- 1953: Hurnli
- 1954: Virgule
- 1955: Dictaway
- 1956: Apollonia
- 1957: Toro
- 1958: Yla
- 1959: Ginetta
- 1960: Timandra
- 1961: Solitude
- 1962: La Sega
- 1963: Altissima
- 1964: Rajput Princess
- 1965: La Sarre
- 1966: Right Away
- 1967: Gazala
- 1968: Pola Bella
- 1969: Koblenza

* The 1949 race was a dead-heat and has joint winners.

== See also ==
- List of French flat horse races
