= Maxime Guyon =

French flat racing jockey (born 1989)

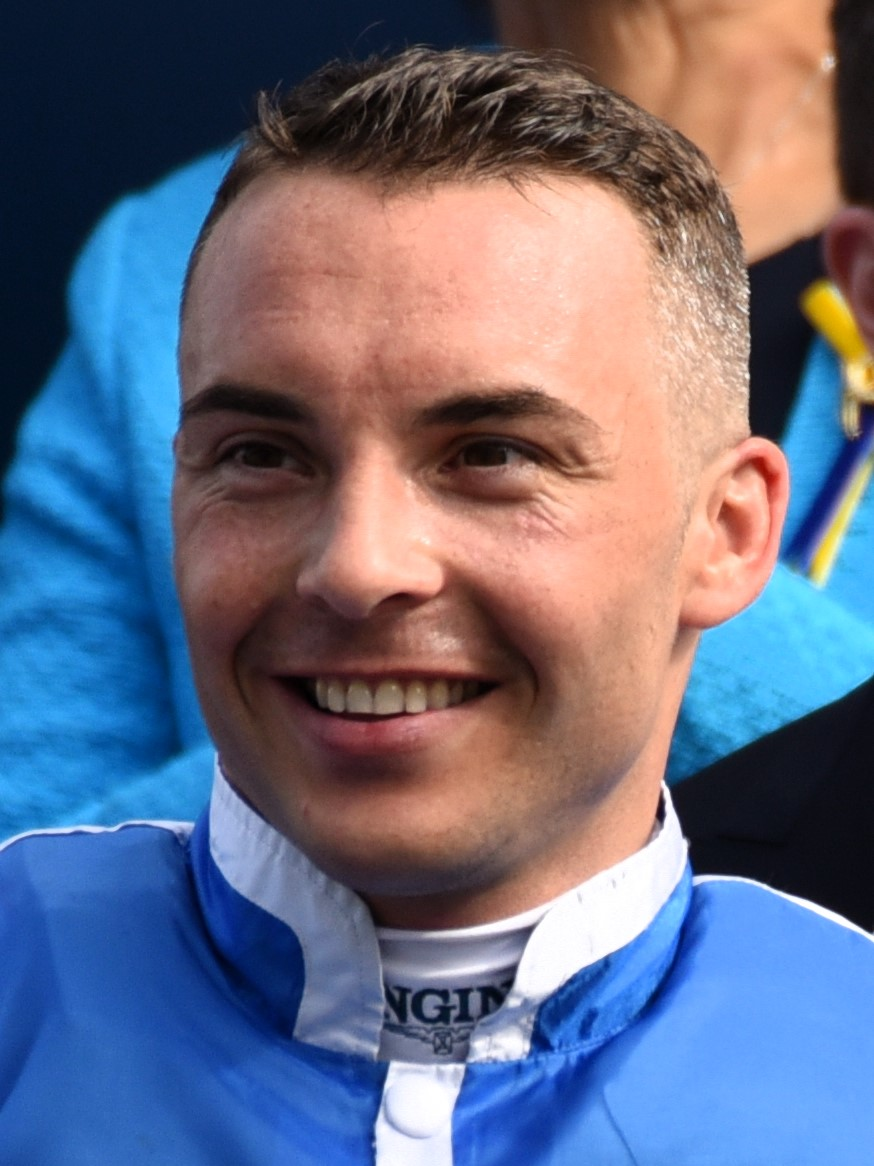
Maxime Guyon winning the Hong Kong Vase 2023 on 10 December 2023

Maxime Guyon (born 7 May 1989 in Laval, Mayenne) is a French flat racing jockey, who debuted at 2005. In 2008, he received a professional license and won first group one at the Grand Prix de Paris. In 2010, he won races in the United Kingdom, Japan and Hong Kong. Since 2015, he is a retained jockey for Wertheimer et Frère, succeeding Olivier Peslier in the role.

In Hong Kong, he made an immediate impact in a short stint with 15 victories that won him second place in the Most Popular Jockey of the Year in the 2010/11 season.

== Major wins ==
France

- Critérium de Saint-Cloud - (2) - Mandaen (2011), Morandi (2012)
- Grand Prix de Paris - (4) - Cavalryman (2009), Meandre (2011), Flintshire (2013), Sosie (2024)
- Grand Prix de Saint-Cloud - (2) - Meandre (2012), Silverwave (2016)
- Poule d'Essai des Poulains - (1) - Lope de Vega (2010)
- Poule d'Essai des Pouliches - (2) - Dream And Do (2020), Rouhiya (2024)
- Prix de Diane - (1) - Golden Lilac (2011)
- Prix d'Ispahan - (3) - Golden Lilac (2012), Solow (2015), Sosie (2025)
- Prix Jean Prat - (2) - Mutual Trust (2011), Aesop's Fables (2012)
- Prix Jean Romanet - (2) - Announce (2011), Romantica (2013)
- Prix du Jockey Club - (1) - Lope de Vega (2010)
- Prix de l'Opéra - (2) - Shalanaya (2009), Rougir (2021)
- Prix Royal-Oak - (3) - Be Fabulous (2011), Double Major (2023, 2024)
- Prix Saint-Alary - (1) - Queen's Jewel (2015)
- Prix Vermeille - (3) - Baltic Baroness (2014), Left Hand (2016), Aventure (2025)
- Prix Ganay - (2) - Cutlass Bay (2010), Sosie (2025)
- Prix Maurice de Gheest - (1) - Polydream (2018)
- Prix de la Forêt - (1) - Kelina (2023)

United Kingdom

- Prince of Wales's Stakes - (1) - Byword (2010)
- 1,000 Guineas - (1) - Miss France (2014)
- Queen Anne Stakes - (1) - Solow (2015)
- Queen Elizabeth II Stakes - (1) - Solow (2015)
- Sussex Stakes - (1) - Solow (2015)

Hong Kong

- Hong Kong Classic Cup - (1) - Ambitious Dragon (2011)
- Hong Kong Derby - (1) - Ambitious Dragon (2011)
- Hong Kong Vase - (3) - Flintshire (2014), Junko (2023), Sosie (2025)

Germany

- Grosser Preis von Berlin - (1) - Meandre (2012)

Italy

- Premio Vittorio di Capua - (1) - Shamalgan (2013)

United Arab Emirates

- Dubai Turf - (2) - Solow (2015), Facteur Cheval (2024)

== Performance ==
Seasons	Total Rides	No. of Wins	No. of 2nds	No. of 3rds	No. of 4ths	Stakes won
2010/2011	175	15	24	15	15	HK$26,185,575
