= Maisons-Laffitte Racecourse =

Horse racing facility in Paris, France

Coordinates: 48°57′58″N 2°10′5″E

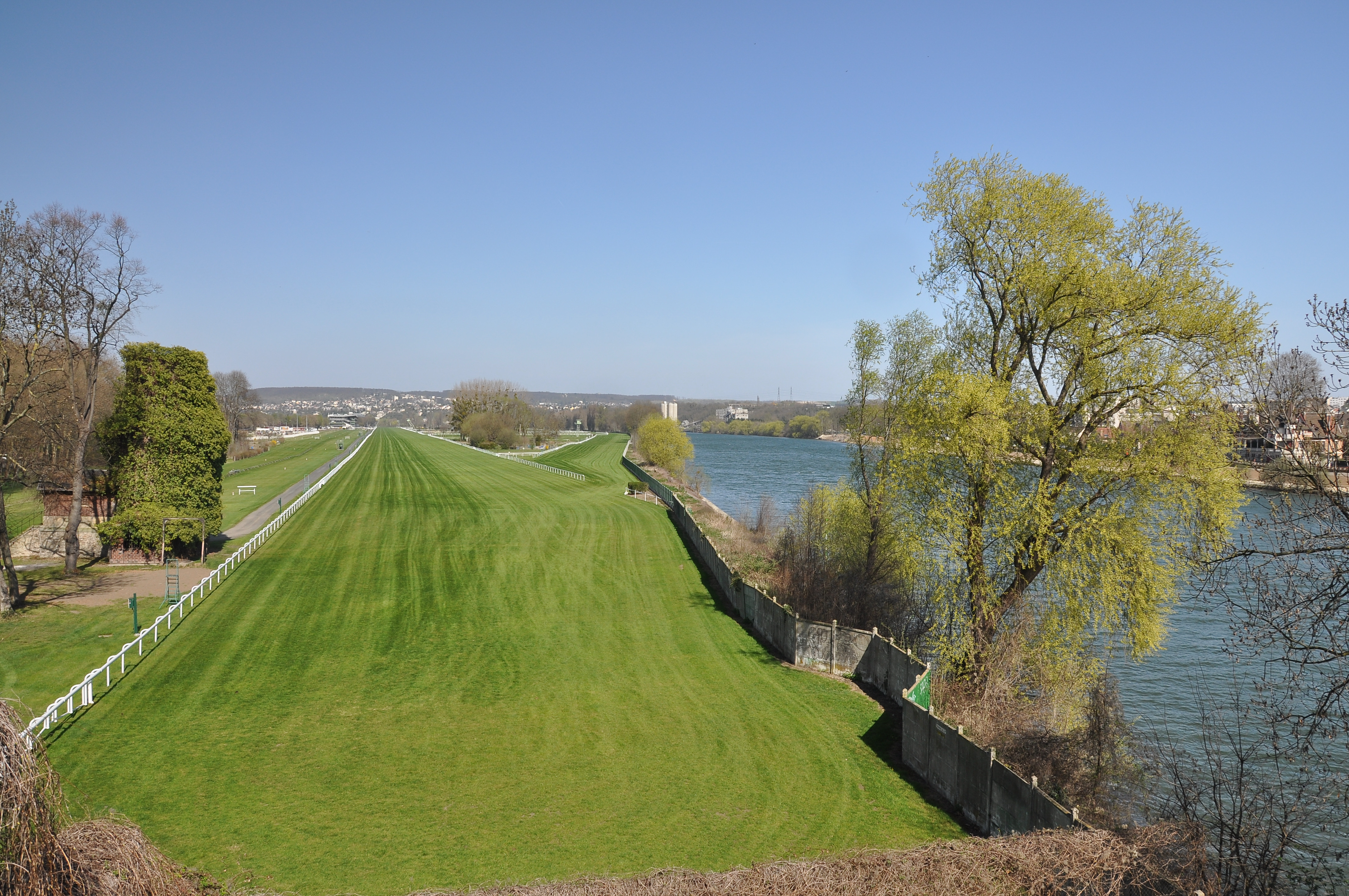
- View of the racecourse from the Maisons-Laffitte bridge
- Location: Maisons-Laffitte, France
- Operated by: Galop
- Date opened: 1878
- Date closed: 2019 (remain for horse training)
- Race type: Thoroughbred flat racing

The Hippodrome de Maisons-Laffitte at 1 avenue de la Pelouse in the northwestern Parisian suburb of Maisons-Laffitte in France was a turf horse racing facility and track for Thoroughbred flat racing. Opened in 1878 by Joseph Oller, inventor of the pari-mutuel machine, it sits on 92 hectares that belonged to the wealthy banker Jacques Laffitte.

The nearby Château de Maisons-Laffitte is home to The Museum of the Racehorse.

In November 2018 France Galop announced that the racecourse would close at the end of 2019 due to financial pressures on the organisation. The final meeting was held on 29 October 2019. Despite the efforts of local government officials during 2020 there are no plans to re-open the track and the racing surface has been allowed fall into disrepair. In early 2023 the sale of the racecourse to a public land operator, L’établissement public foncier d’Île-de-France (EPFIF), was completed. The new owners plan to revitalize the site and restart horse racing.

The racecourse layout was unique as it was one of the few courses in the world that staged both left- and right-handed races. It also featured a 2,000-metre straight track, one of the longest in Europe and three different winning posts.

From early March through to the end of November, the major annual Conditions races at Hippodrome de Maisons-Laffitte were:

- Prix Eugène Adam
- Prix Robert Papin
- Prix Messidor
- La Coupe de Maisons-Laffitte
- Prix Eclipse
- Prix de Seine-et-Oise
- Critérium de Maisons-Laffitte
- Prix Miesque
