= Pivotal (horse) =

British-bred Thoroughbred racehorse

- Sire: Polar Falcon
- Grandsire: Nureyev
- Dam: Fearless Revival
- Damsire: Cozzene
- Sex: Stallion
- Foaled: 19 January 1993
- Country: United Kingdom
- Colour: Chestnut
- Breeder: Cheveley Park Stud
- Owner: Cheveley Park Stud
- Trainer: Sir Mark Prescott
- Record: 6: 4-0-0
- Earnings: £148,023

Major wins
- King's Stand Stakes (1996); Nunthorpe Stakes (1996)

Pivotal (19 January 1993 – 19 November 2021) was a British Thoroughbred racehorse and sire. In a racing career restricted to six races between October 1995 and August 1996 he established himself as one of the leading sprinters in Europe. His most important wins came in the King's Stand Stakes and the Nunthorpe Stakes as a three-year-old in the summer of 1996. He was then retired to stud where he became an exceptionally successful breeding stallion.

== Background ==
Pivotal was a chestnut horse bred and owned by the Cheveley Park Stud. He was the first foal sired by Polar Falcon, an American-bred horse who won the Lockinge Stakes and the Haydock Sprint Cup in England in 1991. The stud's foaling record described him as "a strong, well-made colt of good bone and substance. He is possibly a little light in colour, but he has a good head and plenty of quality". The colt was sent into training with Sir Mark Prescott at the Heath House stable in Newmarket. He was ridden in all but the first of his races by the British jockey George Duffield.

== Racing career ==
=== 1995: two-year-old season ===
Pivotal did not appear on the racecourse until the late autumn of 1995. At Newbury Racecourse on 19 October he started a 16/1 outsider for a six furlong maiden race and finished ninth of the twenty runners behind the Barry Hills-trained Fly Tip. Eleven days later, Pivotal recorded his first success in a six furlong maiden race at Newcastle Racecourse. Ridden for the first time by George Duffield he took the lead inside the final furlong and won by two and a half lengths from Domak Amaam. In November, Pivotal was brought back in distance for a five furlong race at Folkestone Racecourse. He took the lead approaching the final furlong and accelerated clear of the field to win by four lengths in "impressive" style.

=== 1996: three-year-old season ===
Pivotal did not appear as a three-year-old until June when he was sent to Royal Ascot to contest the all-aged King's Stand Stakes over five furlongs. He started at odds of 13/2 in a seventeen-runner field which included Royal Applause and Hever Golf Rose. Duffield positioned the colt among the leaders from the start before producing a strong late run to take the lead in the last strides to win by half a length from Mind Games. On his next appearance, Pivotal started favourite for the July Cup over six furlongs at Newmarket Racecourse but finished sixth of the ten runners behind Anabaa. At York on 22 August, Pivotal was brought back to five furlongs for the Nunthorpe Stakes. He started poorly and was "pushed along" by Duffield in the early stages but finished strongly to catch the front-running Eveningperformance in the last stride and won by a short head.

== Stud record ==
Pivotal was retired to stand at his owners' Cheveley Park Stud at Newmarket. He has proved to be an "excellent" breeding stallion, siring winners of major races over a wide range of distances. He was retired from stud duties in February 2021. He died on 19 November 2021.

=== Major winners ===
c = colt, f = filly, g = gelding

Foaled	Name	Sex	Major Wins
1998	Kyllachy	c	Nunthorpe Stakes
1998	Golden Apples	f	Del Mar Oaks, Beverly D. Stakes, Yellow Ribbon Stakes
1999	Chorist	f	Pretty Polly Stakes
1999	Megahertz	f	John C. Mabee Handicap, Yellow Ribbon Stakes
2000	Somnus	g	Haydock Sprint Cup, Prix Maurice de Gheest, Prix de la Forêt
2001	Peeress	f	Sun Chariot Stakes, Lockinge Stakes
2002	Saoire	f	Irish 1000 Guineas
2004	Excellent Art	c	St. James's Palace Stakes
2004	Regal Parade	g	Haydock Sprint Cup, Prix Maurice de Gheest
2005	Falco	c	Poule d'Essai des Poulains
2005	Virtual	c	Lockinge Stakes
2005	Halfway to Heaven	f	Irish 1000 Guineas, Nassau Stakes, Sun Chariot Stakes
2006	Sariska	f	Oaks Stakes, Irish Oaks
2007	Siyouni	c	Prix Jean-Luc Lagardère
2007	Buzzword	c	Deutsches Derby
2007	Maarek	g	Prix de l'Abbaye
2007	African Story	g	Dubai World Cup
2008	Izzi Top	f	Pretty Polly Stakes, Prix Jean Romanet
2008	Farhh	c	Lockinge Stakes, Champion Stakes
2008	Immortal Verse	f	Coronation Stakes, Prix Jacques Le Marois
2011	Lightning Spear	c	Sussex Stakes
2011	Talco	c	Shoemaker Mile Stakes
2012	Brando	g	Prix Maurice de Gheest
2012	Queen's Jewel	f	Prix Saint-Alary
2013	Blair House	g	Jebel Hatta
2014	Addeybb	g	Ranvet Stakes, Queen Elizabeth Stakes (2), Champion Stakes
2014	Avilius	g	Ranvet Stakes, Tancred Stakes, George Main Stakes
2014	Glen Shiel	g	British Champions Sprint Stakes
2016	Siyarafina	f	Prix Saint-Alary

== Pedigree ==
Pedigree of Pivotal (GB), chestnut stallion, 1993
Sire Polar Falcon (USA) 1987	Nureyev	Northern Dancer	Nearctic
Sire Polar Falcon (USA) 1987	Nureyev	Northern Dancer	Natalma
Sire Polar Falcon (USA) 1987	Nureyev	Special	Forli
Sire Polar Falcon (USA) 1987	Nureyev	Special	Thong
Sire Polar Falcon (USA) 1987	Marie d'Argonne	Jefferson	Charlottesville
Sire Polar Falcon (USA) 1987	Marie d'Argonne	Jefferson	Monticella
Sire Polar Falcon (USA) 1987	Marie d'Argonne	Mohair	Blue Tom
Sire Polar Falcon (USA) 1987	Marie d'Argonne	Mohair	Imberline
Dam Fearless Revival (GB) 1987	Cozzene	Caro	Fortino
Dam Fearless Revival (GB) 1987	Cozzene	Caro	Chambord
Dam Fearless Revival (GB) 1987	Cozzene	Ride The Trails	Prince John
Dam Fearless Revival (GB) 1987	Cozzene	Ride The Trails	Wildwook
Dam Fearless Revival (GB) 1987	Stufida	Bustino	Busted
Dam Fearless Revival (GB) 1987	Stufida	Bustino	Ship Yard
Dam Fearless Revival (GB) 1987	Stufida	Zerbinetta	Henry the Seventh
Dam Fearless Revival (GB) 1987	Stufida	Zerbinetta	Yucatan (Family: 7)
