= Conquistador Cielo =

American-bred Thoroughbred racehorse

- Conquistador Cielo's grave at Claiborne Farm
- Sire: Mr. Prospector
- Grandsire: Raise a Native
- Dam: K D Princess
- Damsire: Bold Commander
- Sex: Stallion
- Foaled: March 20, 1979
- Country: United States
- Colour: Bay
- Breeder: Lewis E. Iandoli
- Owner: Henryk de Kwiatkowski
- Trainer: Woody Stephens
- Record: 13: 9-0-2
- Earnings: $474,328

Major wins
- Saratoga Special Stakes (1981); Belmont Stakes (1982); Metropolitan Handicap (1982); Dwyer Stakes (1982); Jim Dandy Stakes (1982)

Awards
- U.S. Champion 3-Yr-Old Colt (1982); United States Horse of the Year (1982)

Honours
- Aiken Thoroughbred Racing Hall of Fame (1983)

Conquistador Cielo (March 20, 1979 – December 17, 2002) was an American Thoroughbred racehorse. He is best known for his performances as a three-year-old in 1982 when he won the Belmont Stakes and was voted United States Horse of the Year.

== Background ==
Conquistador Cielo was a bay horse sired by the outstanding breeding stallion Mr Prospector. His dam K D Princess was a successful racemare but not a top-class performer. She was descended from Whirl Right, a full-sister to Whirlaway.

He was purchased as a yearling for $150,000 by Henryk de Kwiatkowski, and was trained by Woody Stephens.

== Racing career ==
Racing as a two-year-old, Conquistador Cielo won two races in his four starts.

His handlers had hoped the horse would run in the 1982 Kentucky Derby but he was kept out by a leg injury that wasn't healing to the point where his trainer was satisfied it would be completely safe. In the much easier Preakness Prep, the horse won, but still his trainer skipped the Preakness Stakes to bring him along on an easier route.

Entered in the Grade I Metropolitan Handicap, Conquistador Cielo set a track-record while winning by 7 1/4 lengths against older horses, breaking Stop The Music's record set in 1973. Trainer Woody Stephens then surprised fans and racing insiders with the announcement that the horse was fit enough to race again five days later in the Belmont Stakes, the final leg of the U.S. Triple Crown races.

In the 1982 Belmont Stakes, Conquistador Cielo defeated the opposition, beating Kentucky Derby champion Gato Del Sol by 14 lengths.

Before the 1982 racing season was over, he was sold to a breeding syndicate for a then record price of $36.4 million. Conquistador Cielo's performances in 1982 earned him United States Champion 3-Yr-Old Colt and Horse of the Year honors.

== Stud record ==
Retired to stud duty at Claiborne Farm in Paris, Kentucky, Conquistador Cielo didn't quite live up to expectations but nevertheless sired more than 60 stakes race winners. Among his progeny were stakes winners Marquetry, Forty Niner Days, Alannon, Mi Cielo, Wagon Limit, and Lexicon.

At age 23, the horse suffered an injury to his knee that brought on an acute case of founder in his left front leg. The disease resulted in the veterinarian euthanizing him on December 17, 2002.

== Pedigree ==
Pedigree of Conquistador Cielo (USA), bay stallion, 1979
Sire Mr Prospector (USA) 1970	Raise a Native (USA); 1961	Native Dancer	Polynesian
Sire Mr Prospector (USA) 1970	Raise a Native (USA); 1961	Native Dancer	Geisha
Sire Mr Prospector (USA) 1970	Raise a Native (USA); 1961	Raise You	Case Ace
Sire Mr Prospector (USA) 1970	Raise a Native (USA); 1961	Raise You	Lady Glory
Sire Mr Prospector (USA) 1970	Gold Digger (USA); 1962	Nashua	Nasrullah
Sire Mr Prospector (USA) 1970	Gold Digger (USA); 1962	Nashua	Segula
Sire Mr Prospector (USA) 1970	Gold Digger (USA); 1962	Sequence	Count Fleet
Sire Mr Prospector (USA) 1970	Gold Digger (USA); 1962	Sequence	Miss Dogwood
Dam K D Princess (USA) 1971	Bold Commander (USA); 1960	Bold Ruler	Nasrullah
Dam K D Princess (USA) 1971	Bold Commander (USA); 1960	Bold Ruler	Miss Disco
Dam K D Princess (USA) 1971	Bold Commander (USA); 1960	High Voltage	Ambiorix
Dam K D Princess (USA) 1971	Bold Commander (USA); 1960	High Voltage	Dynamo
Dam K D Princess (USA) 1971	Tammy's Turn (USA); 1965	Turn-To	Royal Charger
Dam K D Princess (USA) 1971	Tammy's Turn (USA); 1965	Turn-To	Source Sucree
Dam K D Princess (USA) 1971	Tammy's Turn (USA); 1965	Tammy Twist	Tim Tam
Dam K D Princess (USA) 1971	Tammy's Turn (USA); 1965	Tammy Twist	Whirl Right (Family: 8-h)
