= Starman (horse) =

British-bred Thoroughbred racehorse

- Sire: Dutch Art
- Grandsire: Medicean
- Dam: Northern Star
- Damsire: Montjeu
- Sex: Colt
- Foaled: 31 March 2017
- Country: United Kingdom
- Colour: Bay
- Breeder: David Ward
- Owner: David Ward
- Trainer: Ed Walker
- Record: 8: 5-1-1
- Earnings: £476,380

Major wins
- Garrowby Stakes (2020); Duke of York Stakes (2021); July Cup (2021)

Awards
- Cartier Champion Sprinter (2021)

Starman (foaled 31 March 2017) is a British Thoroughbred racehorse. A specialist sprinter, he did not race as a two-year-old but won three of his four races as a three-year-old including the Garrowby Stakes. He emerged as one of the best sprinters in Europe in 2021 with wins in the Duke of York Stakes and the July Cup.

== Background ==
Starman is a "huge" bay colt with a small white star bred and owned by David Ward. He was born and raised at Whatton Manor Stud in Nottinghamshire from birth to the end of his yearling year. The colt was sent into training with Ed Walker at Upper Lambourn in Berkshire. He has been ridden in most of his races by Tom Marquand.

He was from the ninth crop of foals sired by Dutch Art, a British stallion who won the Prix Morny and the Middle Park Stakes in 2006. As a breeding stallion his other progeny have included Slade Power, Mabs Cross, Garswood (Prix Maurice de Gheest) and Caspar Netscher (Nearctic Stakes). Starman's dam Northern Star showed modest racing ability, winning one minor race from nine attempts. She was a female-line descendant of the American broodmare Banta (foaled 1949), making her a distant relative of Big Spruce and Trusted Partner.

== Racing career ==
=== 2020: three-year-old season ===
Starman did not race as a two-year-old and was unable to appear on the track in the spring of 2020 as British horse racing was shut down owing the COVID-19 pandemic. He made a belated debut in a six furlong maiden race on the synthetic Polytrack surface at Lingfield Park on 12 July. Starting at odds of 9/2 he took the lead soon after the start and held off a late challenge from the favourite Fresh to win by a neck. At Doncaster Racecourse the following month the colt started third choice in the betting for a novice race (for horses with no more than two previous wins) over the same distance on turf and won again as he gained the advantage a furlong from the finish and came home two and a half lengths clear of the Queen's colt King's Lynn.

Starman was then stepped up in class and matched against older sprinters in the Listed Garrowby Stakes at York Racecourse on 6 September and started 7/2 second favourite behind the six-year-old gelding Dakota Gold who had won the race in 2019. After a slow start Starman settled towards the rear of the nine-runner field before beginning to make progress just after half way. He took the lead inside the final furlong and kept on well to win by one and three quarter lengths from Dakota Gold. After the race Ed Walker said "He was awesome today - he's a really exciting horse. It was a big step up for him. Just the tempo these guys go is totally different to what you'd get in a novice race. Against these six and seven-year-old sprinters, for him to produce a performance like that is huge credit to the horse." He added however, that the horse would have been better suited by firmer ground.

For his final run of the year, Starman was moved up to Group 1 class for the British Champions Sprint Stakes over six furlongs at Ascot on 17 October. He was never going well on the soft ground and sustained his first defeat as he came home fourteenth of the sixteen runners behind Glen Shiel, beaten seventeen lengths by the winner.

=== 2021: four-year-old season ===
On 12 May at York Starman began his second campaign in the Group 2 Duke of York Stakes over six furlongs and went off the 5/1 third choice in the betting behind Oxted and the Lacken Stakes winner Art Power. He was ridden by Oisin Murphy as Marquand took the mount on the Ayr Gold Cup winner Nahaarr. After racing in mid-division he took the lead a furlong out and repelled the challenge of the Nahaarr to win by a neck, with a gap of three and a half lengths back to Oxted in third place. Murphy commented "He's a lovely horse. I'd ridden him a little bit at home and Ed always had a very high opinion of him. He looked really good today, he travelled and he was very chilled out. He's a very exciting horse for the year." The colt was aimed at the Diamond Jubilee Stakes but bypassed the race on account of the prevailing soft ground.

Marquand resumed his partnership with Starman on 10 July when the colt contested the Group 1 July Cup at Newmarket Racecourse and went off the 9/2 second favourite behind the three-year-old Dragon Symbol. The other seventeen runners included Oxted, Glen Shiel, Art Power, Supremacy, Extravagant Kid (Al Quoz Sprint), Brando (Prix Maurice de Gheest), Creative Force and Rohaan (Wokingham Stakes). In a rough race, Starman struggled to obtain a clear run but finished strongly to overtake the front-running Art Power inside the final furlong and prevailed in "impressive" style by one and a quarter lengths and a short head from Dragon Symbol and Oxted. Walker, who was winning his first race at the highest level said "he wasn't concentrating before the race. If you'd caught me then I'd have been very doom and gloom. Then it wasn't happening in the race. I was feeling sorry for myself at the three pole thinking it's more bad luck in a big race, but Tom was great and didn't panic and as soon as he hit the rising ground at the one-and-a-half-furlong pole he just found and found and found."

On 8 August Starman was sent to France and started 1.8/1 joint favourite for the Group 1 Prix Maurice de Gheest over 1300 metres on soft ground at Deauville Racecourse. He raced just behind the leaders before taking the lead 300 metres from the finish and came home third behind Marianafoot and Tropbeau, beaten one and three quarter lengths by the winner. On his next appearance the colt starts favourite for the Haydock Sprint Cup on 4 September but despite producing a strong late run he "just failed" to overhaul the five-year-old gelding Emaraaty Ana and was beaten a short head into second place.

Starman was being prepared for the British Champions Sprint Stakes when he sustained a minor injury in training and was retired from racing. Ed Walker commented "It's a huge shame as we were really looking forward to Saturday and hoping he could prove himself a real champion. I've always thought he was the best around and he's certainly the best I've trained."

On 10 November Starman was named Champion Sprinter at the Cartier Racing Awards.

== Stud career ==
After his retirement from racing, Starman began his career as a breeding stallion at the Tally Ho Stud in Ireland.

=== Notable stock ===
Starman Group 1/Grade 1 winner:

c = colt, f = filly, g = gelding

Foaled	Name	Sex	Major wins
2023	Venetian Sun	f	Prix Morny, Commonwealth Cup

== Pedigree ==
Pedigree of Starman, bay colt, 2017
Sire Dutch Art (GB) 2004	Medicean (GB); 1997	Machiavellian (USA)	Mr. Prospector
Sire Dutch Art (GB) 2004	Medicean (GB); 1997	Machiavellian (USA)	Coup de Folie
Sire Dutch Art (GB) 2004	Medicean (GB); 1997	Mystic Goddess (USA)	Storm Bird (CAN)
Sire Dutch Art (GB) 2004	Medicean (GB); 1997	Mystic Goddess (USA)	Rose Goddess (IRE)
Sire Dutch Art (GB) 2004	Halland Park Lass (IRE); 1999	Spectrum	Rainbow Quest (USA)
Sire Dutch Art (GB) 2004	Halland Park Lass (IRE); 1999	Spectrum	River Dancer
Sire Dutch Art (GB) 2004	Halland Park Lass (IRE); 1999	Palacegate Episode	Drumalis
Sire Dutch Art (GB) 2004	Halland Park Lass (IRE); 1999	Palacegate Episode	Pasadena Lady
Dam Northern Star (IRE) 2010	Montjeu (IRE); 1993	Sadler's Wells (USA)	Northern Dancer (CAN)
Dam Northern Star (IRE) 2010	Montjeu (IRE); 1993	Sadler's Wells (USA)	Fairy Bridge
Dam Northern Star (IRE) 2010	Montjeu (IRE); 1993	Floripedes (FR)	Top Ville (IRE)
Dam Northern Star (IRE) 2010	Montjeu (IRE); 1993	Floripedes (FR)	Toute Cy
Dam Northern Star (IRE) 2010	Slow Sand (USA); 2005	Dixieland Band	Northern Dancer (CAN)
Dam Northern Star (IRE) 2010	Slow Sand (USA); 2005	Dixieland Band	Mississippi Mud
Dam Northern Star (IRE) 2010	Slow Sand (USA); 2005	Slow Down	Seattle Slew
Dam Northern Star (IRE) 2010	Slow Sand (USA); 2005	Slow Down	Corrazona (Family: 5-h)

- Through his dam, Starman was inbred 4 × 4 to Northern Dancer, meaning that this stallion appears twice in the fourth generation of his pedigree.
