= Mabs Cross =

British-bred Thoroughbred racehorse

- Racing silks of David W Armstrong
- Sire: Dutch Art
- Grandsire: Medicean
- Dam: Miss Meggy
- Damsire: Pivotal
- Sex: Mare
- Foaled: 6 June 2014
- Country: United Kingdom
- Colour: Bay
- Breeder: Highfield Farm
- Owner: David W Armstrong
- Trainer: Michael Dods
- Record: 20: 7-2-4
- Earnings: £505,362

Major wins
- Arran Scottish Fillies' Sprint Stakes (2017); Palace House Stakes (2018, 2019); Prix de l'Abbaye (2018)

Awards
- Cartier Champion Sprinter (2018)

Mabs Cross (foaled 6 June 2014) is a British Thoroughbred racehorse and broodmare. She did not compete as a two-year-old in 2017 and in the following year she ran mainly in minor sprint handicaps before being stepped up in class to win the Arran Scottish Fillies' Sprint Stakes on her final appearance of the season. In 2018 she made relentless improvement, winning the Palace House Stakes in spring and then being placed in the King's Stand Stakes and the Nunthorpe Stakes before recording her biggest success in the Prix de l'Abbaye. The highlight of her final campaign was a second win in the Palace House Stakes.

== Background ==
Mabs Cross is a bay mare with no white markings by her owner, David Armstrong's Highfield Farm near Coppull in Lancashire. She was named after Mab's Cross, a monument in Wigan. In November 2015 the yearling filly was put up for auction at Goffs Doncaster sale and was bought for £3,000 by Peter Fahey, whose father Richard Fahey trained many of Armstrong's horses. Despite the "sale" Mabs Cross remained in Armstrong's ownership and was sent into training with Michael Dods at Denton, County Durham.

She was from the sixth crop of foals sired by Dutch Art, a British stallion who won the Prix Morny and the Middle Park Stakes in 2006. As a breeding stallion his other progeny have included Slade Power, Garswood (Prix Maurice de Gheest), Caspar Netscher (Nearctic Stakes), Dutch Connection (Jersey Stakes), Baccarat (Wokingham Handicap) and Producer (Topkapi Trophy). Mabs Cross's dam Miss Meggy won three races for Armstrong including the Listed Hilary Needler Trophy. She was a distant, female-line descendant of the Epsom Oaks winner Mrs Butterwick.

== Racing career ==
=== 2017: three-year-old season ===
After being unraced as a juvenile Mabs Cross began her racing career by running unplaced in a six furlong maiden race at Pontefract Racecourse on 11 April 2017. Nineteen days later in a similar event at Thirsk Racecourse she produced a better effort as she finished a close third in a ten-runner field. For her other races that year she ran over the minimum distance of five furlongs and was partnered on each occasion by Paul Mulrennan. On 23 May on the Tapeta surface at Newcastle Racecourse she started at odds of 3/1 for a maiden and recorded her first success as she drew away from her rivals in the final furlong to win by almost four lengths. On 12 June she followed up in a minor handicap race at Windsor, taking a clear advantage in the final furlong and winning "comfortably" by three quarters of a length. Twelve days later she was matched against older fillies and mares in a handicap at Haydock Park and won "readily", coming home two and a quarter lengths in front of the four-year-old Midnight Malibu at odds of 10/11.

Following a break of over three months, Mabs Cross returned to the track and was moved up in class to contest the inaugural running of the Listed Arran Stakes at Musselburgh Racecourse on 9 October. The race was intended to be run at Ayr in September but was rescheduled when the meeting was abandoned owing to waterlogging. Starting at odds of 5/1 she recovered from a poor start to take the lead inside the final furlong and won by three quarters of a length from the favourite Clem Fandango.

=== 2018: four-year-old season ===
Mabs Cross began her 2018 campaign in the Listed Lansdown Fillies' Stakes at Bath Racecourse on 20 April. She started favourite, but after struggling to obtain a clear run in the closing stages she was beaten a neck by the three-year-old Mrs Gallagher. On 5 May the filly was moved up in class to contest the Group 3 Palace House Stakes at Newmarket Racecourse and started the 9/2 second favourite behind the Molecomb Stakes winner Havana Grey. After being restrained by Mulrennan in the early stages she began to make rapid progress approaching the final furlong, took the lead in the closing stages and won by a neck and half a length from Judicial and Alpha Delphini. Paul Mulrennan commented "I think she learnt a lot from Bath, nothing went right there, but it stood her in good stead today. She's not got many miles on the clock, so we keep dreaming – she keeps improving... you'd think she'd improve a little bit from today".

In the Group 2 Temple Stakes at Haydock on 26 May Mabs Cross finished strongly and came home a close fourth behind Battaash, Washington, D.C.and Kachir. In June the filly was stepped up to Group 1 class to contest the King's Stand Stakes at Royal Ascot and started a 20/1 outsider in a fourteen-runner field. She raced in mid-division before making steady progress in the last quarter mile and finished third behind Blue Point and Battaash, beaten two lengths by the winner. When dropped back to Group 2 class and sent to Ireland for the Sapphire Stakes at the Curragh on 22 July she started favourite but was beaten into third place by Havana Grey and Caspian Prince. In the Group 1 Nunthorpe Stakes at York Racecourse in August Mabs Cross started at odds of 14/1 in a fifteen-runner. After tracking the leaders on the stands-side (the right-hand side from the jockeys' viewpoint) she took the lead in the final furlong but was beaten a nose (the minimum possible distance) by Alpha Delphini. The finish was exceptionally close and the judge had to examine the photo-finish for ten minutes before declaring his verdict. Michael Dods said "She's run a super race. Obviously we'd rather have won, but what can you do. I would have settled for a dead-heat. When it's that close you're disappointed to get beat, but I'm very pleased with her".

On 7 October Mabs Cross was sent to France for the Prix de l'Abbaye over 1000 metres at Longchamp Racecourse in which she was ridden by Gerald Mosse and started at odds of 12/1 in a fifteen-runner field. Her opponents included Battaash, Alpha Delphini, Havana Grey, Tantheem (Prix du Petit Couvert), City Light (Prix de Saint-Georges), Sioux Nation (Phoenix Stakes), Soldier's Call (Flying Childers Stakes), Finsbury Square (Prix du Gros Chêne) and Different League (Albany Stakes). After racing in mid-division as Battaash made the running, Mabs Cross made rapid progress approaching the last 200 metres. She gained the advantage from Soldier's Call in the closing stages and held on to win by a head from the 66/1 outsider Gold Vibe in a blanket finish. After the race Mosse said "They went furious early on and I didn't want to rush her too much, as I felt she was needing time to get into her stride. Once she was ready for her effort she did it very nicely and she's a very good filly with a very good record. This was not a surprise" while Dods explained "We thought about stepping her up to six furlongs, but there is only one Abbaye. That will be it now for this year and I'm looking forward to her coming back and going for all the top sprints next season".

At the 2018 Cartier Awards, Mabs Cross was a "popular winner" in a tight vote for the title of Cartier Champion Sprinter.

=== 2019: five-year-old season ===
On her first appearance of 2019 Mabs Cross attempted to repeat her 2018 success in the Palace House Stakes at Newmarket on 4 May and, with Mulrennan in the saddle went off the 6/1 third choice in the betting behind the three-year-old Sergei Prokofiev (Cornwallis Stakes) and Equilateral. Carrying top weight of 136 pounds, the mare recovered from a poor start to produce a strong late run and overtook Equilateral in the final strides to win by a neck. Paul Mulrennan commented "She had to do it the hard way here... that was a brilliant performance. She's a very special filly and she’ll come on a lot for that too."

In the Temple Stakes at Haydock three weeks later she came home third behind Battaash and Alpha Delphini after losing a shoe in the race. The mare was then sent to Royal Ascot for the King's Stand Stakes on 18 June and finished fourth of the twelve runners behind Blue Point, Battaash and Soldier's Call. Mabs Cross ran consistently for the rest of the season without recovering her very best form. She finished fourth to Battaash in the Nunthorpe, third to Fairyland in the Flying Five Stakes at the Curragh in September, fifth to Glass Slippers in the Prix de l'Abbaye and ninth to Donjuan Triumphant in the British Champions Sprint Stakes at Ascot on 19 October.

In December Mabs Cross was put up for auction at Tattersalls but was bought back by her owners when the bidding stopped at 1,100,000 guineas. David Armstrong's wife Emma said "We had a figure in mind and she didn't reach that – that's the top and bottom of it. We'll look at getting her in foal; David's got his mating plans on the table as we speak".

== Pedigree ==
Pedigree of Mabs Cross, bay filly, 2014
Sire Dutch Art (GB) 2004	Medicean; 1997	Machiavellian (USA)	Mr. Prospector
Sire Dutch Art (GB) 2004	Medicean; 1997	Machiavellian (USA)	Coup de Folie
Sire Dutch Art (GB) 2004	Medicean; 1997	Mystic Goddess (USA)	Storm Bird (CAN)
Sire Dutch Art (GB) 2004	Medicean; 1997	Mystic Goddess (USA)	Rose Goddess (IRE)
Sire Dutch Art (GB) 2004	Halland Park Lass (IRE); 1999	Spectrum	Rainbow Quest (USA)
Sire Dutch Art (GB) 2004	Halland Park Lass (IRE); 1999	Spectrum	River Dancer
Sire Dutch Art (GB) 2004	Halland Park Lass (IRE); 1999	Palacegate Episode	Drumalis
Sire Dutch Art (GB) 2004	Halland Park Lass (IRE); 1999	Palacegate Episode	Pasadena Lady
Dam Miss Meggy (GB) 2002	Pivotal; 1993	Polar Falcon (USA)	Nureyev
Dam Miss Meggy (GB) 2002	Pivotal; 1993	Polar Falcon (USA)	Marie d'Argonne (FR)
Dam Miss Meggy (GB) 2002	Pivotal; 1993	Fearless Revival	Cozzene (USA)
Dam Miss Meggy (GB) 2002	Pivotal; 1993	Fearless Revival	Stufida
Dam Miss Meggy (GB) 2002	Selkirk Rose (IRE); 1995	Pips Pride	Efisio (GB)
Dam Miss Meggy (GB) 2002	Selkirk Rose (IRE); 1995	Pips Pride	Elkie Brooks (GB)
Dam Miss Meggy (GB) 2002	Selkirk Rose (IRE); 1995	Red Note	Rusticaro (FR)
Dam Miss Meggy (GB) 2002	Selkirk Rose (IRE); 1995	Red Note	Hung Pao (GB) (Family:8-c)
