= Emaraaty Ana =

British-bred Thoroughbred racehorse

- Sire: Shamardal
- Grandsire: Giant's Causeway
- Dam: Spirit of Dubai
- Damsire: Cape Cross
- Sex: Gelding
- Foaled: 10 May 2016
- Country: United Kingdom
- Colour: Bay
- Breeder: Rabbah Bloodstock Limited
- Owner: Ahmad Al Shaikh; Mohammed Obaid Al Maktoum
- Trainer: Kevin Ryan
- Record: 19: 5-2-5
- Earnings: £436,801

Major wins
- Gimcrack Stakes (2018); Haydock Sprint Cup (2021)

Emaraaty Ana (foaled 10 May 2016) is a British thoroughbred racehorse. He showed top-class form as a two-year-old in 2018 when he won the Group 2 Gimcrack Stakes but won only one minor race in the next two seasons and was gelded as a four-year-old. He returned as a high-class sprinter at the age of five when he ran second in the Nunthorpe Stakes before winning the Group 1 Haydock Sprint Cup.

== Background ==
Emaraaty Ana is a bay gelding with no white markings bred in England by Rabbah Bloodstock Limited. He initially raced in the colours of Ahmad Al Shaikh and was sent into training with Kevin Ryan at Hambleton, North Yorkshire.

He was from the tenth crop of foals sired by Shamardal whose wins included the Dewhurst Stakes, Poule d'Essai des Poulains, Prix du Jockey Club and St. James's Palace Stakes. His other offspring have included Able Friend, Mukhadram, Lope de Vega and Blue Point. Emaraaty Ana's dam Spirit of Dubai showed good racing ability, winning two races including the Listed Princess Royal Stakes. She was a female-line descendant of the French broodmare Americaine (foaled 1968), making her a relative of Aryenne (Poule d'Essai des Pouliches) and Quest For Fame.

== Racing career ==
=== 2018: two-year-old season ===
Emaraaty Ana began his racing career in a novice race (for horses with no more than two previous wins) over five furlongs at Windsor Racecourse on 30 April when he was ridden by Tom Queally and started at odds of 12/1 in a seven-runner field. He led from the start and increased his advantage in the closing stages to win in "promising" style by two and a quarter lengths from the favourite Blown By Wind. After a break of almost three months the colt was moved up in class and distance for the Listed Rose Bowl Stakes over six furlongs at Newbury Racecourse on 20 July and finished third to Natalie's Joy and Chuck Willis. Despite his defeat Emaraaty Ana was stepped up again for the Group 2 Gimcrack Stakes at York Racecourse on 24 August and went off the 5/1 third choice in the betting. Ridden by Frankie Dettori he took the lead from the start and repelled several challengers to win by half a length from Legends of War. After the race Kevin Ryan said "He's going to make into a lovely three-year-old, he should get a mile and could be one for the 2,000 Guineas. We've always thought him very good. After winning well on debut we were a little disappointed at Newbury, but the ground was a little bit loose that day and he’s still a tad immature." On his final run of the season the colt contested the Group 1 Middle Park Stakes at Newmarket Racecourse on 29 September when he came home fifth behind Ten Sovereigns after looking to be outpaced in the closing stages.

=== 2019: three-year-old season ===
On his first two races as a three-year-old Emaraaty Ana was campaigned over one mile but made little impact. In the 2000 Guineas at Newmarket on 4 May he led until half way but then dropped away quickly and came home eighteenth of the nineteen runners behind Magna Grecia. Three weeks later in the Irish 2000 Guineas at the Curragh he produced a similar effort as he raced in second place for most of the way before fading and finishing twelfth. In June he was dropped in class and distance and ran fifth in the Listed Cathedral Stakes over six furlongs at Salisbury Racecourse. On his final run of the year he started at odds of 5/1 for a minor event at Salisbury on 3 September. Ridden by Andrea Atzeni he led from the start and won by one and a quarter lengths from the six-year-old gelding Ice Age despite losing a shoe in the race.

=== 2020: four-year-old season ===
Emaraaty Ana began his third season in the Group 3 Abernant Stakes at Newmarket on 5 June when he finished third behind Oxted and Breathtaking Look after leading for most of the way. He ran twice in August, running third in the Listed Queensferry Stakes at Chester Racecourse and then coming home last of the eight runners behind Battaash when starting a 40/1 outsider for the Nunthorpe Stakes at York. Shortly after his run at York Emaraaty Ana was gelded. Later in the year he underwent surgery to correct breathing problems.

=== 2021: five-year-old season ===
Emaraaty Ana made his first appearance as a five-year-old in the Listed Cammidge Trophy at Doncaster Racecourse on 27 March when he disputed the lead for most of the way before finishing second to Royal Commando. He ran a close third to Summerghand and Oxted in the Abernant Stakes at Newmarket in April and finished third again in the Palace House Stakes at the same track on 1 May, beaten half a length by the winner Lazuli. In the Duke of York Stakes eleven days later he led for most of the way before tiring in the closing stages and coming home seventh of the twelve runners behind Starman. In the Group 1 July Cup he started at odds of 100/1 and finished eleventh behind Starman, beaten five lengths by the winner. The gelding was then dropped back in class for a minor race over five furlongs at Hamilton Park Racecourse on 31 July when he was ridden by Kevin Stott. Starting the 4/5 favourite he returned to winning form in "impressive" fashion as he took the lead inside the final furlong and came home two and a quarter lengths clear of his opponents.

At York in August Emaraaty Ana ran for the second time in the Nunthorpe Stakes. Although he again started at 40/1 he produced a much better effort than he had done in the previous year as he finished second behind the three-year-old filly Winter Power. Andrea Atzeni took the ride when the gelding contested the Group 1 Sprint Cup over six furlongs on good to firm ground at Haydock Park on 4 September. He started the 11/1 fourth choice in the betting behind Starman, Creative Force (Jersey Stakes) and Art Power (Lacken Stakes) in an eleven-runner field which also included Glen Shiel, Supremacy, Summerghand, Chil Chil (Chipchase Stakes), Happy Romance (Hackwood Stakes), Garrus (Prix de Meautry) and Nando Parrado (Coventry Stakes). After tracking the leaders in the early stages, Emaraaty Ana gained the advantage approaching the final furlong and held off a strong challenge from Starman to win by a short head. Kevin Ryan said "He was a great two-year-old. He lost his way a little bit but Sheikh Mohammed Obaid has been very patient. That's the type of owner he is, he'll wait all day long. We were riding him wrong. We were using his speed early in a race and we started dropping him in. He ran a great race in the Nunthorpe and he was beaten by a very good horse. He's as good a horse as I've trained... When he kicked I thought, 'oh fuck, this is a long way.' It's always a long last furlong. But the horse took him into the race so easily. I knew he'd idle, he'd just prick his ears but the result is the result."

== Pedigree ==
Pedigree of Emaraaty Ana (GB), bay gelding, 2016
Sire Shamardal (USA) 2002	Giant's Causeway (USA); 1997	Storm Cat	Storm Bird (CAN)
Sire Shamardal (USA) 2002	Giant's Causeway (USA); 1997	Storm Cat	Terlingua
Sire Shamardal (USA) 2002	Giant's Causeway (USA); 1997	Mariah's Storm	Rahy
Sire Shamardal (USA) 2002	Giant's Causeway (USA); 1997	Mariah's Storm	Immense
Sire Shamardal (USA) 2002	Helsinki (GB); 1993	Machiavellian (USA)	Mr Prospector
Sire Shamardal (USA) 2002	Helsinki (GB); 1993	Machiavellian (USA)	Coup de Folie
Sire Shamardal (USA) 2002	Helsinki (GB); 1993	Helen Street	Troy
Sire Shamardal (USA) 2002	Helsinki (GB); 1993	Helen Street	Waterway (FR)
Dam Spirit of Dubai (IRE) 2006	Cape Cross (IRE); 1994	Green Desert (USA)	Danzig
Dam Spirit of Dubai (IRE) 2006	Cape Cross (IRE); 1994	Green Desert (USA)	Foreign Courier
Dam Spirit of Dubai (IRE) 2006	Cape Cross (IRE); 1994	Park Appeal	Ahonoora (GB)
Dam Spirit of Dubai (IRE) 2006	Cape Cross (IRE); 1994	Park Appeal	Balydaress
Dam Spirit of Dubai (IRE) 2006	Questina (FR); 1993	Rainbow Quest (USA)	Blushing Groom (FR)
Dam Spirit of Dubai (IRE) 2006	Questina (FR); 1993	Rainbow Quest (USA)	I Will Follow
Dam Spirit of Dubai (IRE) 2006	Questina (FR); 1993	Soviet Squaw (USA)	Nureyev
Dam Spirit of Dubai (IRE) 2006	Questina (FR); 1993	Soviet Squaw (USA)	Apachee (FR) (Family: 4-i)
