= Slade Power =

Irish-bred Thoroughbred racehorse

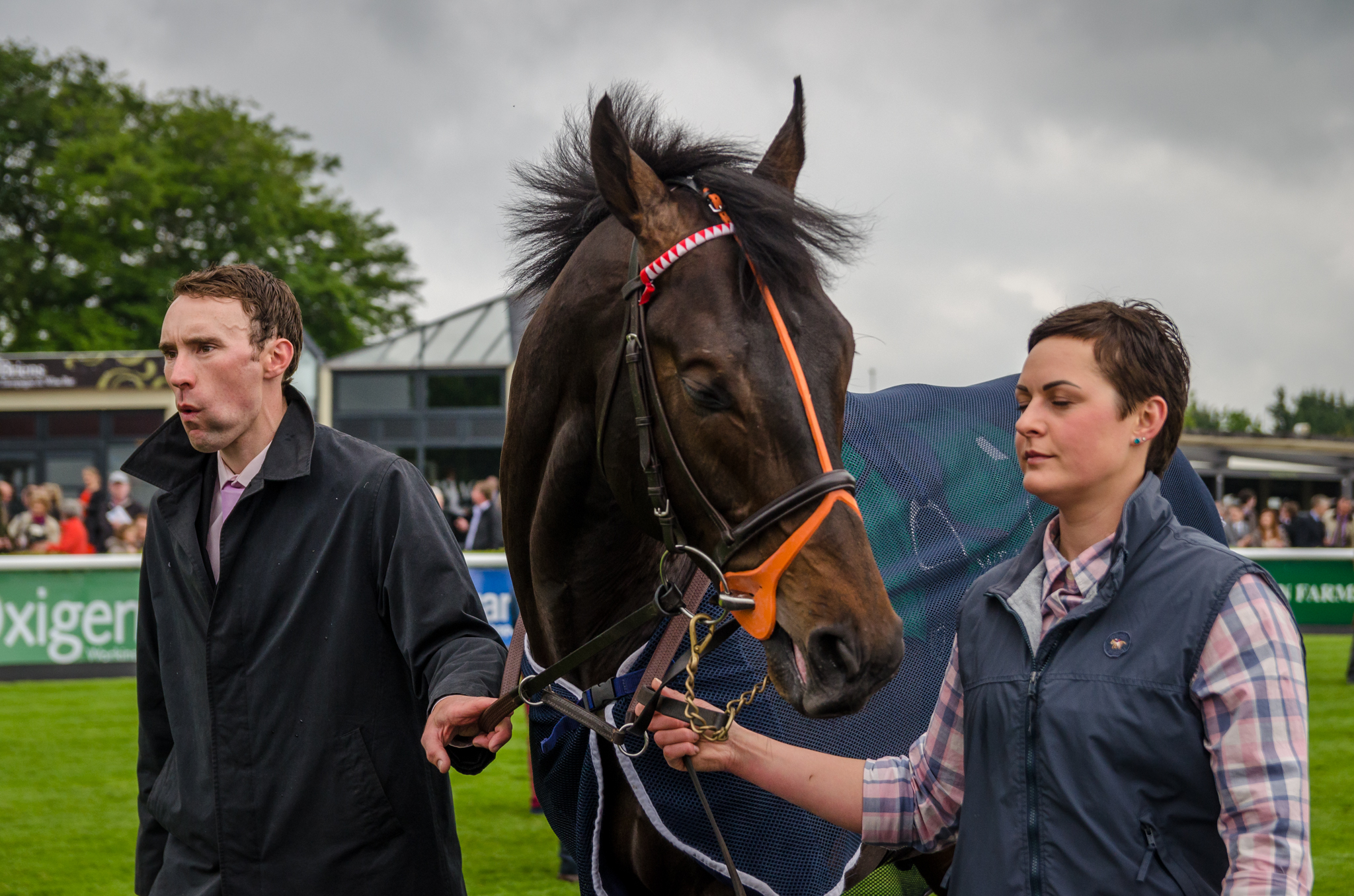
- Slade Power in September 2014.
- Sire: Dutch Art
- Grandsire: Medicean
- Dam: Girl Power
- Damsire: Key of Luck
- Sex: Stallion
- Foaled: 2 April 2009
- Country: Ireland
- Colour: Bay
- Breeder: Sabena Power
- Owner: Sabena Power
- Trainer: Edward Lynam
- Record: 20:10–3–2
- Earnings: £1,067,761

Major wins
- Sandy Lane Stakes (2012); Belgrave Stakes (2012); Sapphire Stakes (2013); Phoenix Sprint Stakes (2013); British Champions Sprint Stakes (2013); Greenlands Stakes (2014); Diamond Jubilee Stakes (2014); July Cup (2014)

Slade Power (foaled 2 April 2009) is an Irish Thoroughbred racehorse. A specialist sprinter, Slade Power won one minor race as a two-year-old in 2011 before winning the Sandy Lane Stakes in England and the Belgrave Stakes in Ireland (both Listed races) in 2012. He emerged as a top-class performer as a four-year-old in 2013, winning the Sapphire Stakes, Phoenix Sprint Stakes and British Champions Sprint Stakes. He was even better in 2014, establishing himself as arguably the leading sprinter in Europe by winning the Greenlands Stakes, Diamond Jubilee Stakes and July Cup.

== Background ==
Slade Power is a bay horse with no white markings bred in Ireland by his owners David and Sabena Power (members of the Power bookmaking family). He was from the first crop of foals sired by Dutch Art a horse who won the Prix Morny and Middle Park Stakes in 2006. Dutch Art's other offspring include Caspar Netscher (Gimcrack Stakes, Mill Reef Stakes), Baccarat (Wokingham Stakes), Producer (Supreme Stakes), Garswood (Lennox Stakes) and Lightning Thunder (runner-up in the 1000 Guineas). Slade Power was the first foal of his dam Girl Power, who won one minor race at Tipperary from seven starts as a three-year-old in 2007.

As a yearling in August 2010 Slade Power was sent to the sales at Doncaster where he was "bought back" for 5000 guineas by the trainer Ed Lynam, acting on behalf of the colt's breeders. He was sent into training with Lynam at Dunshaughlin, County Meath. He has been ridden in all but two of his races by Wayne Lordan.

== Racing career ==
=== 2011: two-year-old season ===
Slade Power began his racing career in a maiden race at the Curragh Racecourse on 2 May. Starting at odd of 14/1, he finished second, beaten four lengths by Reply, a colt trained by Aidan O'Brien. He did not appear again until December, when he recorded his first success in a six furlong maiden race on the Polytrack surface at Dundalk Stadium. Ridden by Pat Smullen, he took the lead approaching the final furlong and won by one and a half lengths from thirteen opponents at odds of 11/10.

=== 2012: three-year-old season ===
Slade Power began his three-year-old season in a handicap race over six furlongs at Cork Racecourse on 7 April. Carrying top weight of 131 pounds and ridden by Johnny Murtagh, he took the lead inside the final furlong and won by one and a quarter lengths from Nini Ok. In the following month he started favourite for a race at Dundalk, but was beaten half a length by the filly Ishvanna, to whom he was conceding eight pounds. On June, Slade Power raced in England for the first time when he contested the Sandy Lane Stakes at Haydock Park Racecourse. He tracked the leaders, moved into second place a furlong out, and took the lead in the closing stages, and won by a neck from Es Que Love, with Lethal Force a length away in third. On his return to Ireland, Slade Power took the Listed Belgrave Stakes at Fairyhouse over six furlongs on soft ground, taking the lead inside the final furlong and winning by half a length from Arctic with the Portland Handicap winner Santo Padre in third and Gordon Lord Byron in fourth. After the race Lynam indicated that the horse would be aimed at the Haydock Sprint Cup and said He is one I am dreaming about and could be very good. I was going to bring him to Newbury yesterday (for the Hackwood Stakes) but I chickened out of it. He seemed to handle the ground well, though Wayne Lordan said he wasn't in love with it." Slade Power did not race again until 20 October, when he was sent to England for the Group Two British Champions Sprint Stakes over six furlongs at Ascot Racecourse. As in many of his races, he started slowly and never looked likely to win, finishing eighth of the fifteen runners behind Maarek. Slade Power sustained a fractured pelvis in the race and, according to Lynam, his life was saved by the treatment administered by the veterinary physician Simon Knapp.

=== 2013: four-year-old season ===
On his 2013 debut, Slade Power started favourite for the Greenlands Stakes at the Curragh on 25 May, and finished third behind Hitchens and Reply. A month later he started at odds of 10/1 for the Diamond Jubilee Stakes at Royal Ascot, but after a poor tart he finished seventh, almost six lengths behind the winner Lethal Force. A week later, the colt started 11/4 favourite for the Sapphire Stakes at the Curragh. He recorded his first Group race win, taking the lead 100 yards from the finish and winning by half a length from Russian Soul. Slade Power started a 16/1 outsider for the Group One July Cup at Newmarket Racecourse. He finished third behind Lethal Force and Society Rock, with the South African champion Shea Shea in fourth and Sole Power in fifth. In August the colt ran in the Group Three Phoenix Sprint Stakes at the Curragh in which he started 2/1 second favourite behind the Aidan O'Brien-trained Sea Siren, an Australian-bred mare whose wins included the Manikato Stakes. Slade Power took the lead approaching the final furlong and won by one and a half lengths from Hamza, with Sea Siren in third. Twelve days later, he ran in the Nunthorpe Stakes at York Racecourse but never recovered from a poor start and finished fifteenth of the seventeen runners behind the 40/1 outsider Jwala.

On his next appearance, Slade Power started at odds of 9/1 for the Group One Haydock Sprint Cup on 7 September with Lethal Force heading the betting at 5/2. He was always travelling well and although he had no chance with the winner Gordon Lord Byron, he finished second, beaten three lengths. On 19 October, Slade Power made his second attempt to win the British Champions Sprint Stakes at Ascot. Racing on soft ground, he started the 7/1 fourth choice in the betting behind Maarek, Viztoria (Park Stakes) and Jack Dexter (Chipchase Stakes). He tracked the leaders before taking the lead two furlongs from the finish and held on in the closing stages to win by a neck from Jack Dexter. Following the race, Lynam said I was seriously concerned about the ground for him but Wayne said his class got him through it. He was pulling up a long way out and when he got to the front he was looking about". Slade Power ended his season in the Hong Kong Sprint on 8 December. He started slowly and was never in contention, finishing tenth of the fourteen runners, eight lengths behind the Japanese champion Lord Kanaloa.

=== 2014: five-year-old season ===
On his first appearance of 2014, Slade Power was matched against Maarek (who had won the Prix de l'Abbaye in October 2013), in the Greenlands Stakes on 24 May. Starting the 5/2 second favourite, he took the lead a furlong from the finish and drew away in the closing stages to win by two lengths from Maarek. On 21 June 2014, Slade Power started the 7/2 favourite for the Diamond Jubilee Stakes on firm ground at Ascot, four days after his stable companion, Sole Power had won the King's Stand Stakes for the second time. His rival included Aljamaaheer (Summer Mile Stakes), American Devil (Prix du Palais-Royal), Astaire (Middle Park Stakes), Tropics (Bengough Stakes), Montiridge (Thoroughbred Stakes)Gordon Lord Byron, Es Que Love and Jack Dexter. The field split into two groups, with Slade Power tracking the leaders on the far side (the right side from the jockeys' viewpoint) before taking the lead approaching the final furlong. In the closing stages he hung left towards the centre of the course but won by one and a half lengths from the Aidan O'Brien-trained three-year-old Due Diligence. After the race, Lynam explained that he had had no doubts about the horse's ability to cope with the fast ground until the day of the race, saying "I never had any issues about the ground but when I read all the clever guys and watched The Morning Line, I started to question it. Nothing wrong with the ground. He just pulls up in front. He's always done that. But it's daunting here. He's used to looking up at one man and his dog in the mornings and 70,000 people roaring at him today".

On 12 July, Slade Power started the 7/4 favourite for the July Cup at Newmarket. He was reopposed by Astaire, Aljamaaheer, Jack Dexter and Tropics, whilst the field also included Gregorian (Diomed Stakes, Hungerford Stakes, Criterion Stakes), the Spanish colt Noozhoh Canarias, and the American-trained gelding Undrafted. As at Ascot, the field split into two groups and Lordan positioned Slade Power just behind the leaders of far side group (the left side from the jockeys' viewpoint). He took the lead a furlong out and won by a length and a half from the 66/1 outsider Tropics, with Gregorian, who raced on the opposite side of the course, taking third ahead of Undrafted. After the race, Lynam named the Darley Classic in Australia as the horse's end of season objective, with the Haydock Sprint Cup as a possible interim target. He said "if he retires to stud as champion European sprinter, it's fine but let's give him the chance to be champion world sprinter. Let's bring him to where they have the best sprinters in the world and hopefully kick their ass... I’m looking forward to running him in Melbourne. He's got to beat Lankan Rupee, who's the exceptional sprinter over there". Commenting on the fact that the horse had sweated badly before the race, David Power said "that was never a concern. It would be a concern if he didn't sweat up. It's part of his nature... We always said this horse needed time and this was always going to be his year" Slade Power made his final racecourse appearance in the Darley Classic but was unplaced, finishing eleventh of the thirteen runners behind Terravista.

== Pedigree ==
Pedigree of Slade Power (IRE), bay horse, 2009
Sire Dutch Art (GB) 2004	Medicean (GB); 1997	Machiavellian	Mr. Prospector
Sire Dutch Art (GB) 2004	Medicean (GB); 1997	Machiavellian	Coup de Folie
Sire Dutch Art (GB) 2004	Medicean (GB); 1997	Mystic Goddess	Storm Bird
Sire Dutch Art (GB) 2004	Medicean (GB); 1997	Mystic Goddess	Rose Goddess
Sire Dutch Art (GB) 2004	Halland Park Lass (GB); 1999	Spectrum	Rainbow Quest
Sire Dutch Art (GB) 2004	Halland Park Lass (GB); 1999	Spectrum	River Dancer
Sire Dutch Art (GB) 2004	Halland Park Lass (GB); 1999	Palacegate Episode	Drumalis
Sire Dutch Art (GB) 2004	Halland Park Lass (GB); 1999	Palacegate Episode	Pasadena Lady
Dam Girl Power (IRE) 2004	Key of Luck (USA); 1991	Chief's Crown	Danzig
Dam Girl Power (IRE) 2004	Key of Luck (USA); 1991	Chief's Crown	Six Crowns
Dam Girl Power (IRE) 2004	Key of Luck (USA); 1991	Balbonella	Gay Mecene
Dam Girl Power (IRE) 2004	Key of Luck (USA); 1991	Balbonella	Bamieres
Dam Girl Power (IRE) 2004	Rumuz (IRE); 1994	Marju	Last Tycoon
Dam Girl Power (IRE) 2004	Rumuz (IRE); 1994	Marju	Flame of Tara
Dam Girl Power (IRE) 2004	Rumuz (IRE); 1994	Balqis	Advocator
Dam Girl Power (IRE) 2004	Rumuz (IRE); 1994	Balqis	Bold But Baffled (Family 11-f)
