= Havana Grey =

- Sire: Havana Gold
- Grandsire: Teofilo
- Dam: Blanc De Chine
- Damsire: Dark Angel
- Sex: Stallion
- Foaled: 12 February 2015 (age 11)
- Country: England
- Colour: Grey
- Breeder: Mickley Stud & Lady Lonsdale
- Owner: Global Racing Club & Mrs E. Burke
- Trainer: Karl Burke
- Jockey: P. J. McDonald
- Record: 16: 6–3–0
- Earnings: £416,421

Major wins
- Flying Five Stakes (2018)

Havana Grey (foaled 12 February 2015) is a British Thoroughbred racehorse and sire. A specialist sprinter, he competed over a distance of 5 furlongs. As a two-year-old, he won four out of his eight races. As a three-year-old, he raced eight times and won two races including the Group 1 Flying Five Stakes. Trained by Karl Burke, he was ridden in all but two of his races by P. J. McDonald. At the end of the 2018 season he was retired to stud and in 2022 was crowned champion first-season sire.

== Background ==
Havana Grey is a grey horse bred by Mickley Stud & Lady Lonsdale and foaled on 12 February 2015. At 15.2½ hands, he is not large for a racehorse and has relatively short legs. His dam, the grey Blanc de Chine, won 6 races from 20 starts over 5 furlongs. His sire, Havana Gold, was bay and won five races over 6 furlongs to a mile, including the Group 1 Prix Jean Prat. Havana Grey was from his sire's first crop and sold to Global Racing Club & Mrs E. Burke for €70,000 at Arqana's August Yearling Sale. He went into training with Karl Burke at Coverham in North Yorkshire.

== Racing career ==
=== 2017: Two-year-old season ===
Havana Grey made his racecourse debut on 22 April 2017 at Nottingham. Starting as favourite in a 5 furlong Novice Stakes, he was beaten half a length into second place. He was ridden by McDonald, who would go on to ride him in all but one of his races. The following month he won a Novice Stakes at Ayr and the Listed National Stakes at Sandown Park. In June, he was entered in the Group 2 Norfolk Stakes at Royal Ascot and came tenth of 17 runners. In July he won the Listed Dragon Stakes at Sandown and on 2 August he made all to win the Group 3 Molecomb Stakes at the Glorious Goodwood meeting. On 20 August, he came second in his first Group 1 race, and only race over six furlongs, the Prix Morny at Deauville, beaten one and a quarter lengths by stable-mate Unfortunately. His final race of the season was the Flying Childers Stakes at Doncaster, in which he was narrowly beaten into second place.

=== 2018: Three-year-old season ===
Havana Grey's first outing of the season was the Group 3 Palace House Stakes at Newmarket. Competing against older horses for the first time, he led until the final furlong and came fifth, one and three quarters lengths behind winner Mabs Cross. His next race was the Group 2 Temple Stakes at Haydock, in which he finished in sixth place behind Battaash. After a two-month break, he was victorious in the Group 2 Sapphire Stakes at the Curragh. In August he came sixth in the King George Stakes at Goodwood and fifth in the Nunthorpe Stakes at York. Ridden by Richard Kingscote as his regular jockey was sidelined with an injury, Havana Grey achieved his first and only Group 1 success in the Flying Five Stakes at the Curragh in September. In October he came eighth of sixteen runners in the Prix de l'Abbaye de Longchamp, finishing two and three quarter lengths behind winner Mabs Cross. His retirement was planned for the end of the season but first he had a trip to Churchill Downs in the US, where, reunited with McDonald, he was beaten 19 lengths by Stormy Liberal in the Breeders' Cup Turf Sprint. It was the only time in his racing career that he had to tackle a bend.

== Stud career ==
After retiring from racing, Havana Grey joined the stallion roster at Whitsbury Manor Stud in Hampshire. In 2019, he stood at a fee of £8,000, which was reduced to £6,500 for 2020 and £6,000 for 2021 and 2022, when he covered 166 mares. In 2022, his first progeny appeared as two-year-olds on the racecourse and 34 winners with earnings of more than £1 million secured him the title of leading first-season sire in Great Britain and Ireland. His fee accordingly went up to £18,500 in 2023. In 2023, two-year-old Vandeek provided Havana Grey with his first Group 1 winner, when he won the Prix Morny. Havana Grey's fee rose to £55,000 in 2024 and his book included three Group 1 winning mares, Glass Slippers, Sky Lantern and his racecourse rival Mabs Cross. In November 2024, Whitsbury Manor Stud announced that his fee would be private in 2025 and that he would only cover mares of 16 hands high or smaller as he did not like using a ramp.

In April 2025, a colt sired by Havana Grey broke the record for a breeze up sale. (Note: A breeze up sale is a sale of unraced two-year-olds who are galloped over two furlongs on the racecourse in front of prospective buyers.) The unraced two-year-old, out of Show Stealer, was bought for 1,750,000 guineas by Amo Racing.

== Notable progeny ==
Group 1 winners:

c = colt, f = filly

Foaled	Name	Sex	Major wins
2021	Vandeek	c	Prix Morny, Middle Park Stakes
2024	Orthodox	c	Middle Park Stakes

== Pedigree ==
Pedigree of Havana Grey, grey stallion, 2015
Sire Havana Gold (IRE) b. 2010	Teofilo (IRE) b. 2004	Galileo (IRE) b. 1998	Sadler's Wells
Sire Havana Gold (IRE) b. 2010	Teofilo (IRE) b. 2004	Galileo (IRE) b. 1998	Urban Sea
Sire Havana Gold (IRE) b. 2010	Teofilo (IRE) b. 2004	Speirbhean (IRE) b. 1998	Danehill
Sire Havana Gold (IRE) b. 2010	Teofilo (IRE) b. 2004	Speirbhean (IRE) b. 1998	Saviour
Sire Havana Gold (IRE) b. 2010	Jessica's Dream (IRE) b. 1998	Desert Style (USA) b. 1992	Green Desert
Sire Havana Gold (IRE) b. 2010	Jessica's Dream (IRE) b. 1998	Desert Style (USA) b. 1992	Organza
Sire Havana Gold (IRE) b. 2010	Jessica's Dream (IRE) b. 1998	Ziffany (GB) b. 1992	Taufan
Sire Havana Gold (IRE) b. 2010	Jessica's Dream (IRE) b. 1998	Ziffany (GB) b. 1992	Bonnie Banks
Dam Blanc De Chine (IRE) gr. 2010	Dark Angel (IRE) gr. 2005	Acclamation (GB) b. 1999	Royal Applause
Dam Blanc De Chine (IRE) gr. 2010	Dark Angel (IRE) gr. 2005	Acclamation (GB) b. 1999	Princess Athena
Dam Blanc De Chine (IRE) gr. 2010	Dark Angel (IRE) gr. 2005	Midnight Angel (GB) gr. 1994	Machiavellian
Dam Blanc De Chine (IRE) gr. 2010	Dark Angel (IRE) gr. 2005	Midnight Angel (GB) gr. 1994	Night At Seal
Dam Blanc De Chine (IRE) gr. 2010	Nullarbor (GB) b. 1994	Green Desert (USA) b. 1983	Danzig
Dam Blanc De Chine (IRE) gr. 2010	Nullarbor (GB) b. 1994	Green Desert (USA) b. 1983	Foreign Courier
Dam Blanc De Chine (IRE) gr. 2010	Nullarbor (GB) b. 1994	Bloudan (USA) ch. 1985	Damascus
Dam Blanc De Chine (IRE) gr. 2010	Nullarbor (GB) b. 1994	Bloudan (USA) ch. 1985	Chain Store

Note: b. = Bay, ch. = Chestnut, gr. = Grey
