= West Wind =

British-bred racehorse

- Sire: Machiavellian
- Grandsire: Mr. Prospector
- Dam: Red Slippers
- Damsire: Nureyev
- Sex: Mare
- Foaled: 29 March 2004
- Country: United Kingdom
- Colour: Chestnut
- Breeder: Darley Stud
- Owner: Sheikh Mohammed; Godolphin
- Trainer: Henri-Alex Pantall; Saeed bin Suroor
- Record: 7: 2-2-2
- Earnings: £388,615

Major wins
- Prix de Diane (2007)

West Wind (foaled 29 March 2004) was a British-bred, French-trained Thoroughbred racehorse and broodmare. She did not race until she was three years old but established herself as a top-class middle-distance performer in 2007 when she won the Prix de Diane as well as running second in the Prix Vermeille and third in the Pretty Polly Stakes. She was retired from racing after running poorly on her only start as a four-year-old.

== Background ==
West Wind is a chestnut mare with a white star and a white sock on her left hind leg bred in England, by her owner Sheikh Mohammed's Darley Stud. She was sent into training with Henri-Alex Pantall at Beaupreau in France.

She was sired by Machiavellian who was the leading French two-year-old of 1989 when he was unbeaten in three races including the Group One Prix Morny and Prix de la Salamandre. As a breeding stallion his best winners included Street Cry, Almutawakel, Medicean and Storming Home and Chic. West Wind's dam Red Slippers showed high-class racing ability, winning three races including the Sun Chariot Stakes. She was a full-sister to the Jockey Club Stakes winner Romanov and a half-sister to Balanchine.

== Racing career ==
=== 2007: three-year-old season ===
West Wind was unraced as a juvenile and began her racing career in the Prix Nikellora over 1600 metres on very soft ground at Saint-Cloud Racecourse on 23 March when she started at odds of 3/1 and finished strongly to take third place behind Aloush and Mindarina, beaten three and a half lengths by the winner. The filly was then moved up in distance for the 2000 metre Prix de la Flandrie at Longchamp Racecourse in April in which she led for most of the way before being overtaken 100 metres from the finish and beaten three-quarters of a length by Coquerelle with Aloush in third. Having been partnered by Johan Victoire in her first two races West Wind was ridden by Christophe Lemaire when she contested the Prix de la Chapelle en Serval at Chantilly Racecourse on 9 May and recorded her first success, coming home two and a half lengths clear of the André Fabre-trained Concentric after taking the lead 200 metres from home.

On 10 June at Chantilly West Wind was partnered by Frankie Dettori in the Group 1 Prix de Diane over 2100 metres at Chantilly and went off the 4.5/1 third choice in the betting behind Coquerelle (who had won the Prix Saint-Alary in May) and Vadapolina (Prix Cléopâtre). The other eleven runners included Cinnamon Bay (Prix d'Angerville), Believe Me (second in the Prix Saint-Alary), Sweet Lily (Silver Tankard Stakes), Mrs Lindsay (Prix Penelope) and Anabaa's Creation (Prix Isonomy). West Wind raced in mid-division before making progress in the straight, overcame interference to overtake the front-running Mrs Lindsay 300 metres from the finish and won by one and a half lengths. Dettori, who had won both the Epsom Derby and the Prix du Jockey Club on the previous weekend, said "It is crazy. I am delighted as it is the first time I have won the Prix de Diane, but also I have ridden Alex's first Group 1 winner. It is an historic day. West Wind ran a beautiful race. The trainer was very sweet on her before the race and she quickened beautifully as soon as I asked her". An emotional Pantall commented "It's been a long time coming", said Pantall. "All week I was really confident with the only slight worry about whether she would get a clear passage and not get blocked".

Less than three weeks after her win at Chantilly, West Wind was sent overseas for the first time to contest the Pretty Polly Stakes at the Curragh, a race which saw her matched against older fillies and mares. With Johnny Murtagh in the saddle she started the 7/2 second favourite and finished third behind Peeping Fawn and the four-year-old Speciosa. After a break of almost three months the filly was stepped up in distance for the Prix Vermeille over 2400 metres at Longchamp in which she was reunited with Johan Victoire. After being restrained towards the rear of the ten runner field she produced a strong late run but failed to overhaul Mrs Lindsay and was beaten three quarters into second place.

=== 2008: four-year-old season ===
Before the start of her second season West Wind was transferred to the ownership of Sheikh Mohammed's Godolphin and moved to the training stable of Saeed bin Suroor in the United Arab Emirates. On her first and only appearance for her new trainer the filly ran poorly as she came home fifteenth of the sixteen runners in the Dubai Sheema Classic over 2400 metres at Nad Al Sheba Racecourse on 29 March.

== Breeding record ==
At the end of her racing career West Wind was retired to become a broodmare for Godolphin. She produced at least six foals and three winners:

- West Riding, a bay colt (later gelded), foaled in 2010, sired by Cape Cross. Unplaced in only race.
- True Match, bay filly, 2011, by Cape Cross. Fourth in only race.
- Zephuros, bay colt (gelded), 2012, by Invincible Spirit. Won one races.
- Parasail, chestnut filly, 2014, by New Approach. Unplaced in only race.
- Setting Sail, bay colt, 2015, by Dansili. Won four races.
- New Winds, chestnut filly, 2016, by New Approach. Won two races.

== Pedigree ==
Pedigree of West Wind (GB), chestnut mare, 2004
Sire Machiavellian (USA) 1987	Mr. Prospector (USA); 1970	Raise a Native	Native Dancer
Sire Machiavellian (USA) 1987	Mr. Prospector (USA); 1970	Raise a Native	Raise You
Sire Machiavellian (USA) 1987	Mr. Prospector (USA); 1970	Gold Digger	Nashua
Sire Machiavellian (USA) 1987	Mr. Prospector (USA); 1970	Gold Digger	Sequence
Sire Machiavellian (USA) 1987	Coup de Folie (USA); 1982	Halo	Hail To Reason
Sire Machiavellian (USA) 1987	Coup de Folie (USA); 1982	Halo	Cosmah
Sire Machiavellian (USA) 1987	Coup de Folie (USA); 1982	Raise The Standard (CAN)	Hoist The Flag (USA)
Sire Machiavellian (USA) 1987	Coup de Folie (USA); 1982	Raise The Standard (CAN)	Natalma (USA)
Dam Red Slippers (USA) 1989	Nureyev (USA); 1977	Northern Dancer	Nearctic
Dam Red Slippers (USA) 1989	Nureyev (USA); 1977	Northern Dancer	Natalma (USA)
Dam Red Slippers (USA) 1989	Nureyev (USA); 1977	Special	Forli (ARG)
Dam Red Slippers (USA) 1989	Nureyev (USA); 1977	Special	Thong
Dam Red Slippers (USA) 1989	Morning Devotion (USA); 1982	Affirmed	Exclusive Native
Dam Red Slippers (USA) 1989	Morning Devotion (USA); 1982	Affirmed	Won't Tell You
Dam Red Slippers (USA) 1989	Morning Devotion (USA); 1982	Morning Has Broken	Prince John
Dam Red Slippers (USA) 1989	Morning Devotion (USA); 1982	Morning Has Broken	A Wind Is Rising (Family: 4-k)
