= Siyouma =

Irish-bred Thoroughbred racehorse

- Sire: Medicean
- Grandsire: Machiavellian
- Dam: Sichilla
- Damsire: Danehill
- Sex: Mare
- Foaled: 3 April 2008
- Country: Ireland
- Colour: Bay
- Breeder: Aga Khan IV
- Owner: Aga Khan IV; Robert Jeffcock
- Trainer: Alain de Royer-Dupré; François Doumen
- Record: 11: 6-0-3
- Earnings: £541,842

Major wins
- Sun Chariot Stakes (2012); E. P. Taylor Stakes (2012)

Siyouma (foaled 3 April 2008) is an Irish-bred, French-trained Thoroughbred racehorse and broodmare. Bred and originally owned by the Aga Khan she was unraced as a two-year-old and won one minor race as a three-year-old in 2011 before being sold at auction. In 2012 she emerged as a top-class racemare, winning the Sun Chariot Stakes in England and the E. P. Taylor Stakes in Canada as well as finishing third in the Falmouth Stakes and fourth in the Prix Jean Romanet. After her retirement from racing she was sold and exported to Japan.

== Background ==
Siyouma is a bay mare with a white star and a white sock on her left hind leg bred in Ireland by her owner Aga Khan IV. His sire Medicean was an outstanding miler whose wins included the Lockinge Stakes, Queen Anne Stakes and Eclipse Stakes. His other offspring have included Nannina, Dutch Art, Al Shemali (Dubai Duty Free Stakes), Capponi (Al Maktoum Challenge, Round 3) and Mr Medici (Champions & Chater Cup). Siyouma's dam Sichilla showed great promise in a brief racing career, winning two of her three races including the Listed Prix Amandine, and as a broodmare, she also produced Siyouni, a colt who won the Prix Jean-Luc Lagardère in 2007. She was distantly descended from the influential American broodmare Blue Filly.

Siyouma was sent to race in France and entered training with Alain de Royer-Dupré,

== Racing career ==
=== 2011: three-year-old season ===
Siyouma did not race as a two-year-old, making her debut in a maiden race over 2000 metres at Maisons-Laffitte Racecourse on 16 May in which she finished fourth of the seventeen runners behind Arisk. Four weeks later she started 8/5 favourite for a similar event over the same distance at Longchamp Racecourse. Ridden as on her debut by Christophe Lemaire, she won by a head from Un Jour and nine others.

The filly did not race again in 2011 and in December she was put up for auction at the Arqana sale in Deauville. She was bought for €220,000 by the trainer François Doumen and entered the ownership of the English businessman and horse breeder Robert Jeffcock.

=== 2012: four-year-old season ===
On her first appearance as a four-year-old, Siyouma contested a minor stakes race over 2000 metres at Compiègne on 12 March and won "easing down" by two lengths from the seven-year-old gelding Le Roi Mage. Two weeks later she finished third to Pagera and Haya Landa in the Prix Banassa at Saint-Cloud Racecourse and on April 27 she ran fourth behind Aiavoski in the Listed Vase d'Argent at Toulouse. On 28 May she was stepped up in class for the Group Two Prix Corrida at Saint-Cloud and started a 28/1 outsider in a ten-runner field. Ridden by Thierry Jarnet she stayed on strongly in the straight to take third place, beaten a nose and three quarters of a length by Solemia and Shareta.

In all of her subsequent races, Siyouma was ridden by Gerald Mosse. In July she was sent to England and brought back in distance for the Group One Falmouth Stakes over one mile at Newmarket Racecourse. Starting at odds of 33/1 she was restrained by Mosse in the early stages before staying on to take third behind Giofra and Elusive Kate with the unplaced horses including Maybe and Golden Lilac. On her return to France in August she finished fifth behind Snow Fairy, Izzi Top, Galikova and Timepiece in the Prix Jean Romanet although she was later promoted to fourth when the "winner" tested positive for a banned substance.

On 29 September Siyouma returned to Newmarket for the Group One Sun Chariot Stakes and started at odds of 12/1 in an eight-runner field. The Poule d'Essai des Pouliches winner Beauty Parlour started favourite ahead of Elusive Kate whilst the other runners were Chachamaidee (Matron Stakes), Up (Blandford Stakes), Laugh Out Loud (Prix de Sandringham), Gamilati (Cherry Hinton Stakes, UAE 1000 Guineas) and La Collina (Phoenix Stakes). Mosse settled the filly in second place as Laugh Out Loud set the early pace. Siyouma took the lead a furlong out and held off a challenge from Elusive Kate to win by three quarters of a length with Laugh Out Loud holding on to take third ahead of La Collina. Doumen commented "She is the most satisfactory thing in the world. She is easy to train, she has an easy temperament and is very calm. Gerald said that she won with something in hand and nobody will be able to criticise his ride today. She could go for the EP Taylor at Woodbine in two weeks' time as we could get some cut in the ground there. She is better on softer ground. But the fact that she has won today reassures me that we could look at Hong Kong or Japan". When it was pointed out that her owner was English he responded "nobody is perfect".

Siyouma was then sent to Canada to contest the Grade I E. P. Taylor Stakes over a mile and a quarter at Woodbine Racetrack on 14 October and started favourite in a thirteen-runner field which included runners from Canada, the United States, England, Ireland and France. The best fancied of her opponents were Dream Peace (Prix de la Nonette, runner-up in the Diana Stakes), Princess Highway (Ribblesdale Stakes) and Barefoot Lady (Nell Gwyn Stakes, Canadian Stakes). After racing in mid-division, Siyouma was switched to the outside, took the lead a furlong and a half from the finish and won in "impressive" style by one and three quarter lengths and a neck from Pagera and Dream Peace. After the race Doumen commented "She's so good and she's so calm. She has got such a wonderful temperament that it allows her to travel beautifully well and takes all the effort away".

On her final appearance, Siyouma was sent to Sha Tin Racecourse for the Hong Kong Mile on 9 December. She never looked likely to win and could not recover after being hampered in the straight, finishing eleventh of the twelve runners behind Ambitious Dragon.

== Breeding record ==
At the end of her racing career Siyouma was sold to the Yoshida family's Northern Farm and exported to become a broodmare in Japan. In her first three seasons she was covered by Deep Impact. She produced bay colts in 2014 and 2015 followed by a bay filly in 2016.

== Pedigree ==
Pedigree of Siyouma (IRE), bay mare, 2008
Sire Medicean (GB) 1997	Machiavellian (USA); 1987	Mr. Prospector	Raise a Native
Sire Medicean (GB) 1997	Machiavellian (USA); 1987	Mr. Prospector	Gold Digger
Sire Medicean (GB) 1997	Machiavellian (USA); 1987	Coup de Folie	Halo
Sire Medicean (GB) 1997	Machiavellian (USA); 1987	Coup de Folie	Raise the Standard
Sire Medicean (GB) 1997	Mystic Goddess (USA); 1990	Storm Bird	Northern Dancer
Sire Medicean (GB) 1997	Mystic Goddess (USA); 1990	Storm Bird	South Ocean
Sire Medicean (GB) 1997	Mystic Goddess (USA); 1990	Rose Goddess	Sassafras
Sire Medicean (GB) 1997	Mystic Goddess (USA); 1990	Rose Goddess	Cocarde
Dam Sichilla (IRE) 2002	Danehill (USA); 1986	Danzig	Northern Dancer
Dam Sichilla (IRE) 2002	Danehill (USA); 1986	Danzig	Pas de Nom
Dam Sichilla (IRE) 2002	Danehill (USA); 1986	Razyana	His Majesty
Dam Sichilla (IRE) 2002	Danehill (USA); 1986	Razyana	Spring Adieu
Dam Sichilla (IRE) 2002	Slipstream Queen (USA); 1990	Conquistador Cielo	Mr. Prospector
Dam Sichilla (IRE) 2002	Slipstream Queen (USA); 1990	Conquistador Cielo	K D Princess
Dam Sichilla (IRE) 2002	Slipstream Queen (USA); 1990	Country Queen	Explodent
Dam Sichilla (IRE) 2002	Slipstream Queen (USA); 1990	Country Queen	Carrie's Rough (Family: 12-b)

- Siyouma was inbred 3 × 4 to Mr. Prospector, meaning that this stallion appears in both the third and fourth generations of her pedigree.
