= Dutch Art =

British-bred Thoroughbred racehorse

- Sire: Medicean
- Grandsire: Machiavellian
- Dam: Halland Park Lass
- Damsire: Spectrum
- Sex: Stallion
- Foaled: 18 March 2004
- Country: United Kingdom
- Colour: Chestnut
- Breeder: Cromlech Bloodstock
- Owner: Matthew Green; Susan Roy; Cheveley Park Stud
- Trainer: Peter Chapple-Hyam
- Record: 10: 4-3-1
- Earnings: £461,889

Major wins
- Norfolk Stakes (2006); Prix Morny (2006); Middle Park Stakes (2006)

Awards
- Top-rated British two-year-old (2006); Leading first-season European sire (2011)

Dutch Art (foaled 18 March 2004) is a British Thoroughbred racehorse and sire. He was rated the best British two-year-old of 2006, when he was unbeaten in four races including the Norfolk Stakes, Prix Morny and Middle Park Stakes. In the following year he failed to win but finished second in the July Cup and Prix Maurice de Gheest and third in the 2000 Guineas. Since retiring to stud in 2008 he has had considerable success as a breeding stallion.

== Background ==
Dutch Art is a chestnut horse standing 15.3 hands high with a white blaze and a long white sock on his left hind foot bred in the United Kingdom by Cromlech Bloodstock. His sire Medicean was an outstanding miler whose wins included the Lockinge Stakes, Queen Anne Stakes and Eclipse Stakes. His other offspring have included Nannina, Siyouma (Sun Chariot Stakes, E. P. Taylor Stakes), Al Shemali (Dubai Duty Free Stakes), Capponi (Al Maktoum Challenge, Round 3) and Mr Medici (Champions & Chater Cup). Dutch Art's dam Halland Park Lass showed no ability as a racehorse, finishing last in all three of her races, but became a successful broodmare who also produced the Blandford Stakes winner Up. She was a female-line descendant of the Irish Oaks winner Silken Glider.

As a foal in November 2004 Dutch Art was offered for sale at Tattersalls and was bought for 14,500 guineas by the Curragh Bloodstock Agency. In the following September he returned to the auction ring at Doncaster and was sold for 16,000 guineas to Blandford Bloodstock. He entered the ownership of Matthew Green and was sent into training with Peter Chapple-Hyam (recently returned from a spell in Hong Kong) at his St Gatien stables in Newmarket.

== Racing career ==
=== 2006: two-year-old season ===
Dutch Art made his first racecourse appearance in a minor race over five furlongs at Windsor Racecourse on 5 June. ridden by Alan Munro he started the 11/4 second favourite and won by one and three quarter lengths from the filly Simply Perfect. The colt was then acquired by Paul and Susan Roy and was stepped up in class for the Group Three Norfolk Stakes at Royal Ascot on 22 June and started second favourite in an eleven-runner field. He was retrained by Munro in the early stages before taking the lead a furlong out and winning by one and three quarter lengths from the favoured Hoh Mike.

After a two-month break Dutch Art was sent to France for the Prix Morny on very soft ground at Deauville Racecourse in which he was ridden by Christophe Soumillon. His six opponents included Sandwaki (winner of the Prix du Bois), Excellent Art and Boccasini (Prix Robert Papin). He tracked Sandwaki before taking the lead 300 metres from the finish and won by a length and a head from Magic America and Excellent Art. Frankie Dettori took over the ride when the colt started the 6/5 favourite for the Middle Park Stakes at Newmarket Racecourse on 29 September. His five opponents were Brave Tin Soldier (Blenheim Stakes), Conquest (Gimcrack Stakes), Hellvelyn (Coventry Stakes), Wi Dud (Flying Childers Stakes) and Captain Marvelous. After racing alongside Brave Tin Soldier he went to the front two furlongs from the finish and won by two lengths from Wi Dud, with Captain Marvelous a length and a quarter back in third place. After the race Chapple=Hyam compared the horse not unfavourably to his 2000 Guineas winner Rodrigo de Triano before explaining "I only bought him because I was short of two-year-olds last year and thought I should have a few early types this year. He gets better and better."

Dutch Art was rated the best British-trained juvenile of 2006 and spent the winter of 2006/7 Dutch Art as second favourite in the ante-post betting for the 2000 Guineas, behind the unbeaten Irish colt Teofilo.

=== 2007: three-year-old season ===
In 2007 Dutch Art was ridden in all but one of his races by Jimmy Fortune. Before the start of the season a major share in the horse had been bought by the Cheveley Park Stud. On his three-year-old debut he started the odds-on favourite for the Greenham Stakes (a major trial race for the 2000 Guineas) over seven furlongs at Newbury Racecourse on 21 April but lost his unbeaten record as he was defeated by the Richard Hannon Sr.-trained Major Cadeaux. In the 2000 Guineas two weeks later he started at odds of 14/1 in a field of twenty-four runners. The field split into two groups across the wide course and although Dutch Art got the better of Duke of Marmalade to finish first in the group racing on the far side (the right-hand side from the jockeys' viewpoint) he was beaten into third behind Cockney Rebel and Vital Equine who raced up the stands side. In the St James's Palace Stakes at Royal Ascot he defeated Cockney Rebel but finished only fourth behind Excellent Art, Duke of Marmalade and Astronomer Royal.

Dutch Art returned to sprint distances for his three remaining races starting with the July Cup in which he was matched against older horses for the first time. After being blocked in his run at half way he finished strongly to take second, half a length behind Sakhee's Secret with Red Clubs and Marchand d'Or in third and fourth. In August he raced for the second time at Deauville and started favourite for the Prix Maurice de Gheest. He took the lead 200 metres from the finish but was overtaken in the closing stages and beaten a length by Marchand d'Or. On his final appearance he made little impact in the Prix de la Forêt at Longchamp Racecourse in October, finishing sixth behind the German-trained outsider Toylsome.

== Stud record ==
At the end of his racing career Dutch Art was retired to become a breeding stallion at the Cheveley Park Stud in Newmarket. His progeny to date have included Slade Power, Mabs Cross, Starman, Garswood (Prix Maurice de Gheest), Caspar Netscher (Nearctic Stakes), Dutch Connection (Jersey Stakes), Baccarat (Wokingham Handicap) and Producer (Topkapi Trophy). By 2016 his stud fee had risen to £40,000.

== Pedigree ==
Pedigree of Dutch Art (GB), chestnut stallion, 2004
Sire Medicean (GB) 1997	Machiavellian (USA); 1987	Mr. Prospector	Raise a Native
Sire Medicean (GB) 1997	Machiavellian (USA); 1987	Mr. Prospector	Gold Digger
Sire Medicean (GB) 1997	Machiavellian (USA); 1987	Coup de Folie	Halo
Sire Medicean (GB) 1997	Machiavellian (USA); 1987	Coup de Folie	Raise the Standard
Sire Medicean (GB) 1997	Mystic Goddess (USA); 1990	Storm Bird	Northern Dancer
Sire Medicean (GB) 1997	Mystic Goddess (USA); 1990	Storm Bird	South Ocean
Sire Medicean (GB) 1997	Mystic Goddess (USA); 1990	Rose Goddess	Sassafras
Sire Medicean (GB) 1997	Mystic Goddess (USA); 1990	Rose Goddess	Cocarde
Dam Halland Park Lass (IRE) 1999	Spectrum (IRE); 1992	Rainbow Quest	Blushing Groom
Dam Halland Park Lass (IRE) 1999	Spectrum (IRE); 1992	Rainbow Quest	I Will Follow
Dam Halland Park Lass (IRE) 1999	Spectrum (IRE); 1992	River Danver	Irish River
Dam Halland Park Lass (IRE) 1999	Spectrum (IRE); 1992	River Danver	Dancing Shadow
Dam Halland Park Lass (IRE) 1999	Palacegate Episode (IRE); 1990	Drumalis	Tumble Wind
Dam Halland Park Lass (IRE) 1999	Palacegate Episode (IRE); 1990	Drumalis	Virna
Dam Halland Park Lass (IRE) 1999	Palacegate Episode (IRE); 1990	Pasadena Lady	Captain James
Dam Halland Park Lass (IRE) 1999	Palacegate Episode (IRE); 1990	Pasadena Lady	Gliding Gay (Family: 5-h)
