= Supremacy (horse) =

Irish-bred Thoroughbred racehorse

- Racing silks of Jason Goddard
- Sire: Mehmas
- Grandsire: Acclamation
- Dam: Triggers Broom
- Damsire: Arcano
- Sex: Colt
- Foaled: 28 March 2018
- Country: Ireland
- Colour: Bay
- Breeder: Kangyu International Racing
- Owner: Jason Goddard
- Trainer: Clive Cox
- Record: 4: 3-0-0
- Earnings: £157,257

Major wins
- Richmond Stakes (2020); Middle Park Stakes (2020)

Supremacy (foaled 28 March 2018) is an Irish-bred, British-trained Thoroughbred racehorse. He was one of the best two-year-old colts in Europe in 2020 when he won three of his four races including the Richmond Stakes and the Middle Park Stakes.

== Background ==
Supremacy is a bay colt with a white blaze and a white sock on his right hind leg bred in Ireland by the Hong Kong-based Kangyu International Racing. As a yearling he was offered for sale at Goffs in November 2019 and was bought for £65,000 by the trainer Clive Cox. He entered the ownership of Jason Goddard and was taken into training by Cox at Lambourn, Berkshire.

He was from the first crop of foals sired by Mehmas who won the July Stakes and the Richmond Stakes in 2016 before being retired at the end of his two-year-old season. Supremacy's dam Triggers Broom showed no racing ability, failing to win or place in her five starts, but was a half-sister to the Champions Mile winner Xtension. She was a female-line descendant of the British broodmare Bongrace, making her a distant relative of Blushing John, Royal Diamond and Hurricane Run.

== Racing career ==
=== 2020: two-year-old season ===
Supremacy made his racecourse debut in a novice race (for juveniles with no more than two previous wins) over six furlongs at Windsor Racecourse on 16 June and came home sixth of the eleven runners, seven lengths behind the winner Twaasol. Three weeks later, over the same course and distance, the colt started at odds of 6/1 and recorded his first victory as he led from the start and won by one and a half lengths. On 30 July Supremacy was stepped up in class for the Group 2 Richmond Stakes at Goodwood Racecourse in which he was ridden, as on his previous start, by Adam Kirby and went off the 11/2 third choice in the betting behind Yazaman (second in the July Stakes) and Qaader (second in the Coventry Stakes). Supremacy went to front immediately and drew away in the final furlong to win by four lengths. Kirby commented Kirby said: "He's a big, long-striding horse and once he gets into that stride, he covers a lot of ground. He's a horse I think a lot of. He's got a bit of scope, so he will definitely train on... he's got a great personality, he's chilled out and takes these races day by day."

Kirby was again in the saddle when Supremacy was moved up to the highest class to contest the Group 1 Middle Park Stakes at Newmarket Racecourse on 26 September. He went off the 13/2 fourth favourite behind Lucky Vega, Method (winner of the Rose Bowl Stakes) and Minzaal (Gimcrack Stakes), while the other four runners included Tactical (July Stakes) and The Lir Jet (Norfolk Stakes). Kirby again adopted front-running tactics and Supremacy was never headed, repelling a sustained challenge from Lucky Vega to win by half a length. After the race Clive Cox said "He's a complete speedball and likes to get on with it. Adam has ridden him beautifully, got the fractions right, and I'm just delighted with the way he finished off. I'm really excited about him for next year as well because I think he's got more developing and strengthening to do over the winter. He's just pure class."

In the official European classification of for 2020 Supremacy was given a rating of 118, making him the second best two-year-old of the season two pounds behind the top-rated St Mark's Basilica.

== Pedigree ==
Pedigree of Supremacy (IRE), bay colt, 2018
| Sire Mehmas (IRE) 2014 | Acclamation (GB); 1999 | Royal Applause | Waajib (IRE) |
| Sire Mehmas (IRE) 2014 | Acclamation (GB); 1999 | Royal Applause | Flying Melody (IRE) |
| Sire Mehmas (IRE) 2014 | Acclamation (GB); 1999 | Princess Athena (IRE) | Ahonoora (GB) |
| Sire Mehmas (IRE) 2014 | Acclamation (GB); 1999 | Princess Athena (IRE) | Shopping Wise |
| Sire Mehmas (IRE) 2014 | Lucina (GB); 2002 | Machiavellian (USA) | Mr Prospector |
| Sire Mehmas (IRE) 2014 | Lucina (GB); 2002 | Machiavellian (USA) | Coup de Folie |
| Sire Mehmas (IRE) 2014 | Lucina (GB); 2002 | Lunda (IRE) | Soviet Star (USA) |
| Sire Mehmas (IRE) 2014 | Lucina (GB); 2002 | Lunda (IRE) | Lucayan Princess |
| Dam Triggers Broom (IRE) 2012 | Arcano (IRE); 2007 | Oasis Dream (GB) | Green Desert (USA) |
| Dam Triggers Broom (IRE) 2012 | Arcano (IRE); 2007 | Oasis Dream (GB) | Hope (IRE) |
| Dam Triggers Broom (IRE) 2012 | Arcano (IRE); 2007 | Tariysha | Daylami |
| Dam Triggers Broom (IRE) 2012 | Arcano (IRE); 2007 | Tariysha | Tarwiya |
| Dam Triggers Broom (IRE) 2012 | Great Joy (IRE); 1996 | Grand Lodge (USA) | Chief's Crown |
| Dam Triggers Broom (IRE) 2012 | Great Joy (IRE); 1996 | Grand Lodge (USA) | La Papagena (GB) |
| Dam Triggers Broom (IRE) 2012 | Great Joy (IRE); 1996 | Cheese Soup (USA) | Spectacular Bid |
| Dam Triggers Broom (IRE) 2012 | Great Joy (IRE); 1996 | Cheese Soup (USA) | Avum (Family 1-l) |
