= Arran Scottish Fillies' Sprint Stakes =

Flat horse race in Britain

Arran Scottish Fillies' Stakes
- Class: Listed
- Location: Ayr Racecourse; Ayr, Scotland
- Race type: Flat / Thoroughbred
- Website: Ayr

Race information
- Distance: 5f 110y (1,106 metres)
- Surface: Turf
- Track: Straight
- Qualification: Three-years-old and up fillies & mares exc. Group 1 winners since 31 March
- Weight: 9 st 0 lb (3yo); 9 st 2 lb (4yo+); Penalties; 7 lb for Group 2 winners* 5 lb for Group 3 winners 3 lb for Listed winners * since 31 March
- Purse: £47,000 (2025); 1st: £26,654

Scottish Fillies' Sprint Stakes
2026
Fluorescence	Beautiful Diamond	Nariko

Previous years
2025
Beautiful Diamond	Star Of Mehmas	Rhyme Dust
2024
Star Of Lady	Rage Of Bamby	Frost At Dawn
2023
Pink Crystal	Secret Angel	Marine Wave
2022
Gale Force Maya	Pink Crystal	Tenaya Canyon
2021
Dandalla	Bimble	Keep Busy

2020-2017
2020
Exceptional	Last Empire	Dandy's Beano
2019
Lady In France	Que Amoro	Gold Filigree
2018
Intense Romance	Mayleaf Shine	Richenza
2017
Mabs Cross	Clem Fandango	Glenrowan Rose

The Arran Scottish Fillies' Sprint Stakes is a Listed flat horse race in Great Britain open to mares and fillies aged three years or older. It is run at Ayr over a distance of 5 furlongs and 110 yards (1,106 metres), and it is scheduled to take place each year in September. It is currently held on the second day of Ayr's three-day Ayr Gold Cup Festival (previously the Western Meeting).

The race was introduced as a new Listed race in 2017 but the scheduled first running was abandoned due to waterlogging. The race was rescheduled and run at Musselburgh in October over the slightly shorter distance of 5 furlongs.

== Records ==
Most successful horse:

- No horse has won this race more than once

Leading jockey (2 wins):

- Ben Curtis – Lady In France (2019), Dandalla (2021)

Leading trainer (3 wins):

- Michael Dods – Mabs Cross (2017), Intense Romance (2018), Gale Force Maya (2022)
- Karl Burke - Lady In France (2019), Dandalla (2021), Beautiful Diamond (2025)

== Winners ==
Year	Winner	Age	Jockey	Trainer	Time
2017 ^{[a]}	Mabs Cross	3	Paul Mulrennan	Michael Dods	0:59.95
2018	Intense Romance	4	Callum Rodriguez	Michael Dods	1:10.61
2019	Lady In France	3	Ben Curtis	Karl Burke	1:03.77
2020	Exceptional	3	Paul Hanagan	Richard Fahey	1:05.97
2021	Dandalla	3	Ben Curtis	Karl Burke	1:02.42
2022	Gale Force Maya	6	Connor Beasley	Michael Dods	1:04.20
2023	Pink Crystal	4	Jason Hart	William Haggas	1:04.98
2024	Star Of Lady M	4	David Nolan	David O'Meara	1:01.30
2025	Beautiful Diamond	4	Clifford Lee	Karl Burke	1:06.69
2026	Fluorescence	4	Danny Tudhope	Edward Bethell	1:07.72

^{a} The 2017 running took place in October at Musselburgh after the Ayr Gold Cup meeting was abandoned because of waterlogging.
