= Mr Medici =

Irish-bred Thoroughbred racehorse

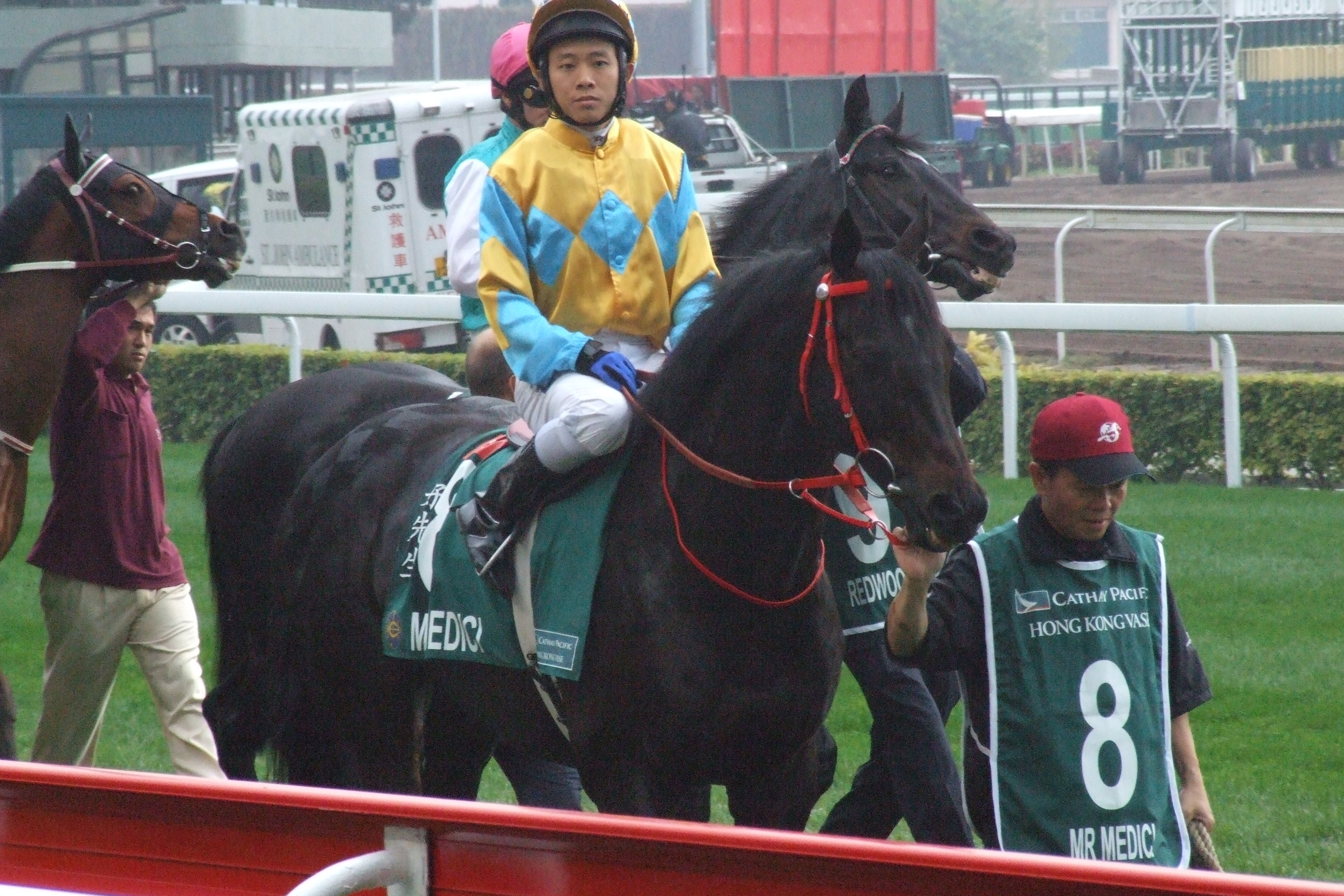
Mr Medici with unknown rider and team member

Mr Medici (Chinese: 好先生) is an Ireland-born, Hong Kong-based Thoroughbred racehorse. In the 2009–2010 season, he won the HKG1 Standard and Chartered Champions and Chater Cup. He also is one of the nominees of Hong Kong Horse of the Year.

== Profile ==
- Sire: Medicean
- Dam: Way For Life
- Dam's Sire: Platini
- Sex: Horse
- Country: Ireland
- Colour: Bay
- Owner: Mr & Mrs Allen Shi Lop Tak
- Trainer: Peter L. Ho
- Record: (No. of 1-2-3-Starts) 3-10-7-54 (As of 18 May 2015)
- Earnings: HK$19,391,750 (As of 18 May 2015)
