= Arcano (horse) =

Irish-bred Thoroughbred racehorse

- Sire: Oasis Dream
- Grandsire: Green Desert
- Dam: Tariysha
- Damsire: Daylami
- Sex: Stallion
- Foaled: 14 February 2007
- Country: Ireland
- Colour: Bay
- Breeder: Yellow Bird Syndicate
- Owner: Sangster family Hamdan Al Maktoum
- Trainer: Brian Meehan
- Record: 5: 3-0-1
- Earnings: £252,054

Major wins
- July Stakes (2009); Prix Morny (2009)

Arcano (foaled 14 February 2007) is an Irish-bred, British-trained Thoroughbred racehorse and sire. He was one of the best European colts of his generation in 2009 when he was unbeaten in three races including the July Stakes and the Prix Morny. He failed to win in two races as a three-year-old and was retired at the end of his second season. He has stood at a breeding stallion in Ireland and Italy and has had some success as a breeding stallion.

== Background ==
Arcano is a bay horse with a small white star bred in Ireland by the Yellow Bird Syndicate. As a yearling in October 2008 he was offered for sale at Tattersalls and bought for 90,000 guineas by the bloodstock agents McKeever St Lawrence on behalf of a group of owners headed by members of the Sangster family. The colt was sent into training with Brian Meehan at Manton in Wiltshire.

He was sired by Oasis Dream, a sprinter who won the July Cup and the Nunthorpe Stakes in 2003 before becoming a very successful breeding stallion. His other progeny have included Jwala, Charming Thought, Goldream, Midday, Power and Muhaarar. Arcano's dam, Tariysha, was an unraced mare bred in Ireland by the Aga Khan. She was a female-line descendant of the outstanding French sprinter Texana.

== Racing career ==
=== 2009: two-year-old season ===
On his racecourse debut Arcano started the 7/2 second favourite for a maiden race over six furlongs on good to firm ground at Newbury Racecourse on 11 June. Ridden by Martin Dwyer, he took the lead a furlong out and held off the challenge of the John Gosden-trained Showcasing (later to win the Gimcrack Stakes) to win by a head. On 9 July the colt was stepped up in class for the Group 2 July Stakes at Newmarket Racecourse in which he was again partnered by Dwyer and was made the 7/4 favourite against ten opponents. After tracking the front-running Orpen Grey, he took the lead inside the final furlong and won by three quarters of a length with a gap of three lengths back to Red Jazz in third. Shortly after the race the colt was acquired privately by Hamdan Al Maktoum.

The Prix Morny over 1200 metres at Deauville Racecourse on 23 August attracted a field of five runners and saw Arcano, ridden by Richard Hills, start the second choice in the betting behind his fellow English challenger Canford Cliffs (winner of the Coventry Stakes). The other three runners were Special Duty (Prix Robert Papin), Zanzibari (Prix de Cabourg) and Dolled Up (Prix du Bois). After being restrained at the rear of the field as Special Duty set the pace, the colt began to make rapid progress in the last 300 metres and took the lead in final strides. In a "blanket finish" Arcano won by a short neck and a neck from Special Duty and Canford Cliffs with Dolled Up and Zanzibari also finishing within a length of the winner. Brian Meehan commented "Our horse is still a baby and there's masses of improvement to come. All options are open, but he does want to go further". The winning time of 1:07.90 was a new course record.

In the official rating of 2009's European two-year-olds, Arcano was given a rating of 118, making him the fourth-best juvenile of the season behind St Nicholas Abbey, Passion for Gold and Jan Vermeer, and level with Canford Cliffs, Siyouni and Vale of York.

=== 2010: three-year-old season ===
Almost eight months after his last start, Arcano began his second campaign in the Greenham Stakes (a major trial race for the 2000 Guineas) over seven furlongs at Newbury in April. He started at odds of 2/1 in a five-runner field but sustained his first defeat as he came home third behind Dick Turpin and Canford Cliffs. On his only subsequent race Arcano was dropped in class and distance for a minor event over six furlongs at Doncaster Racecourse on 31 July. He started the 10/11 favourite but finished last of the five runners behind Vitoria.

== Stud record ==
Arcano was retired to stud to become a breeding stallion in Ireland before moving to Italy in 2016. The best of his progeny have included: Just Glamorous (Prix du Petit Couvert), Tajaanus (Sweet Solera Stakes), Another Touch (Pomfret Stakes), Abel Handy (Cornwallis Stakes) and Grey Britain (Fairway Stakes).

== Pedigree ==
Pedigree of Arcano (IRE), bay stallion, 2007
Sire Oasis Dream (GB) 2000	Green Desert (USA); 1983	Danzig	Northern Dancer (CAN)
Sire Oasis Dream (GB) 2000	Green Desert (USA); 1983	Danzig	Pas de Nom
Sire Oasis Dream (GB) 2000	Green Desert (USA); 1983	Foreign Courier	Sir Ivor
Sire Oasis Dream (GB) 2000	Green Desert (USA); 1983	Foreign Courier	Courtly Dee
Sire Oasis Dream (GB) 2000	Hope (IRE); 1991	Dancing Brave (USA)	Lyphard
Sire Oasis Dream (GB) 2000	Hope (IRE); 1991	Dancing Brave (USA)	Navajo Princess
Sire Oasis Dream (GB) 2000	Hope (IRE); 1991	Bahamian	Mill Reef (USA)
Sire Oasis Dream (GB) 2000	Hope (IRE); 1991	Bahamian	Sorbus
Dam Tariysha (IRE) 2002	Daylami (IRE); 1994	Doyoun	Mill Reef (USA)
Dam Tariysha (IRE) 2002	Daylami (IRE); 1994	Doyoun	Dumka (FR)
Dam Tariysha (IRE) 2002	Daylami (IRE); 1994	Daltawa	Miswaki (USA)
Dam Tariysha (IRE) 2002	Daylami (IRE); 1994	Daltawa	Damana (FR)
Dam Tariysha (IRE) 2002	Tarwiya (IRE); 1989	Dominion (GB)	Derring-Do
Dam Tariysha (IRE) 2002	Tarwiya (IRE); 1989	Dominion (GB)	Picture Palace
Dam Tariysha (IRE) 2002	Tarwiya (IRE); 1989	Touraya	Tap On Wood
Dam Tariysha (IRE) 2002	Tarwiya (IRE); 1989	Touraya	Takrana (GB) (Family: 5-b)

- Arcano was inbred 4 × 4 to Mill Reef, meaning that this stallion appears twice in the fourth generation of his pedigree.
