= Nedawi =

British-bred Thoroughbred racehorse

- Racing colours of Godolphin
- Sire: Rainbow Quest
- Grandsire: Blushing Groom
- Dam: Wajd
- Damsire: Northern Dancer
- Sex: Stallion
- Foaled: 9 April 1995
- Country: United Kingdom
- Colour: Chestnut
- Breeder: Sheikh Mohammed
- Owner: Godolphin
- Trainer: Saeed Bin Suroor
- Record: 7: 3-2-1
- Earnings: £428,656

Major wins
- Gordon Stakes (1998); St. Leger Stakes (1998)

Nedawi (foaled 9 April 1995), is a retired British Thoroughbred racehorse and active sire. In a career that lasted from June 1998 until July 1999, he ran seven times and won three races. He recorded his most important success by winning the Classic St. Leger Stakes as a three-year-old in 1998, the same year that he won the Gordon Stakes. In the following season he finished second in the Dubai Turf Classic and the King George VI and Queen Elizabeth Stakes before being retired to stud.

== Background ==
Nedawi, was a "big, leggy" chestnut horse with a white blaze bred by his owner Sheikh Mohammed. He was sired by the Prix de l'Arc de Triomphe winner Rainbow Quest out of Wajd, a mare who won the Grand Prix d'Evry and the Prix de Minerve. Wajd was a daughter of the double King George VI and Queen Elizabeth Stakes winner Dahlia. Nedawi was sent into training with Saeed Bin Suroor, spending his winters in Dubai and the summers in England.

== Racing career ==
=== 1998: three-year-old season ===
Unraced as a two-year-old, Nedawi made his first racecourse appearance in a twelve furlong maiden race at Goodwood on 5 June 1998. Starting at odds of 5/2 and ridden by Frankie Dettori he took the lead three furlongs from the finish and drew clear to win by six lengths from the odds-on favourite Tuning. A month later, Nedawi started favourite for a Listed race at Haydock but finished third behind Rabah and Courteous. Three weeks later, Nedawi returned to Glorious Goodwood and was moved up in class to contest the Group Three Gordon Stakes, an important trial race for the St Leger. He led inside the final furlong and stayed on "gamely" to force a dead-heat with Rabah.

On 12 September, Nedawi started 5/2 favourite for the St Leger at Doncaster, where he was ridden by John Reid, as Dettori was riding Swain in the Irish Champion Stakes on the same afternoon.. He tracked the leaders in the early stages before moving forward to challenge in the straight. Nedawi proved a difficult ride for Reid, swerving to the right and then hanging to the left before catching the filly High and Low, ridden by Jimmy Fortune, inside the final furlong and winning by half a length. Reid, who had recently been told that he was to be replaced by Fortune as the leading jockey for Robert Sangster mimicked Dettori's flying dismount and said that the victory had given him great satisfaction, while admitting that the race may not have been as strong as usual.

=== 1999: four-year-old season ===
In the winter of 1998-9, Nedawi was sent to the Godolphin training base in Dubai. He made his first appearance as a four-year-old in the Dubai Turf Classic at Nad Al Sheba Racecourse on 28 March. Ridden by Dettori he took the lead in the straight but was caught in the last strides and beaten a neck by the Mark Johnston-trained Fruits of Love.

Nedawi was returned to Godolphin's European base at Newmarket and sent to Royal Ascot for the Gold Cup in June. He started favourite at odds of 7/2 in a field which included such notable stayers as Kayf Tara, Celeric and Persian Punch, but finished fifth, 6 1/2 lengths behind the winner Enzeli. A month after his defeat in the Gold Cup, Nedawi returned to Ascot for Britain's most prestigious all-aged race, the King George VI and Queen Elizabeth Stakes. While there was some speculation that he would be used as a pacemaker for his stable companion Daylami, the Godolphin team insisted that he would run on his own merits. Ridden by Gary Stevens, he took the lead just after half way in the mile and half contest and "shook off" the challenge of the 1999 Epsom Derby winner Oath before being headed by Daylami in the straight. He stayed on to finish second, five lengths behind Daylami and ahead of Fruits of Love, Silver Patriarch, Indigenous and Oath. After the race he was found to have sustained an ankle injury. Nedawi's final race was at Newbury in the Geoffrey Freer Stakes where he finished third. He was entered in the Melbourne Cup for which he was made joint top weight, but did not meet the engagement and was retired.

== Stud career ==
At the end of his racing career, Nedawi was sent to stand as a stallion in Brazil. His most notable offspring was Mr Nedawi, who won Grade I races in Brazil, Argentina and Uruguay.

== Pedigree ==
Pedigree of Nedawi (GB), chestnut stallion, 1995
Sire Rainbow Quest (USA) 1981	Blushing Groom; 1974	Red God	Nasrullah
Sire Rainbow Quest (USA) 1981	Blushing Groom; 1974	Red God	Spring Run
Sire Rainbow Quest (USA) 1981	Blushing Groom; 1974	Runaway Bride	Wild Risk
Sire Rainbow Quest (USA) 1981	Blushing Groom; 1974	Runaway Bride	Aimee
Sire Rainbow Quest (USA) 1981	I Will Follow; 1975	Herbager	Vandale
Sire Rainbow Quest (USA) 1981	I Will Follow; 1975	Herbager	Flagette
Sire Rainbow Quest (USA) 1981	I Will Follow; 1975	Where You Lead	Raise A Native
Sire Rainbow Quest (USA) 1981	I Will Follow; 1975	Where You Lead	Noblesse
Dam Wajd (USA) 1987	Northern Dancer; 1961	Nearctic	Nearco
Dam Wajd (USA) 1987	Northern Dancer; 1961	Nearctic	Lady Angela
Dam Wajd (USA) 1987	Northern Dancer; 1961	Natalma	Native Dancer
Dam Wajd (USA) 1987	Northern Dancer; 1961	Natalma	Almahmoud
Dam Wajd (USA) 1987	Dahlia; 1970	Vaguely Noble	Vienna
Dam Wajd (USA) 1987	Dahlia; 1970	Vaguely Noble	Noble Lassie
Dam Wajd (USA) 1987	Dahlia; 1970	Charming Alibi	Honey's Alibi
Dam Wajd (USA) 1987	Dahlia; 1970	Charming Alibi	Adorada (Family:13-c)
