= Medicean (horse) =

British-bred Thoroughbred racehorse

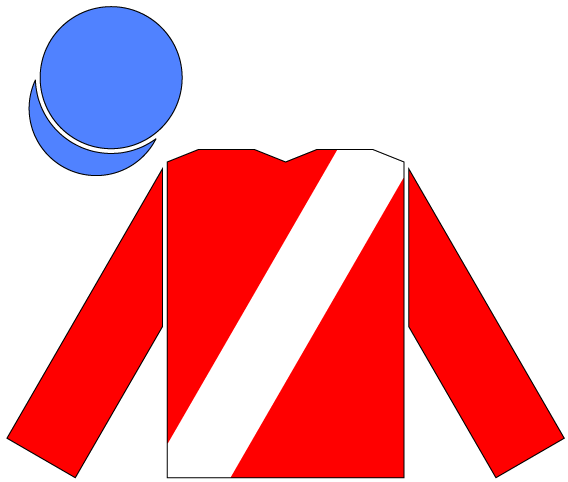
- Racing colours of Cheveley Park Stud
- Sire: Machiavellian
- Grandsire: Mr. Prospector
- Dam: Mystic Goddess
- Damsire: Storm Bird
- Sex: Stallion
- Foaled: 26 February 1997
- Died: 30 August 2018 (aged 21)
- Country: United Kingdom
- Colour: Chestnut
- Breeder: Cheveley Park Stud
- Owner: Cheveley Park Stud
- Trainer: Michael Stoute
- Record: 12: 6-0-4
- Earnings: £547,055

Major wins
- Celebration Mile (2000); Lockinge Stakes (2001); Queen Anne Stakes (2001); Eclipse Stakes (2001)

Medicean (26 February 1997 – 30 August 2018) was a British Thoroughbred racehorse and sire, best known for his performances as a four-year-old in 2001, when he recorded three consecutive wins in important British races. Unraced as a two-year-old, Medicean ran eight times in 2000, winning the Celebration Mile and finishing third in both the St James's Palace Stakes and the Sussex Stakes. In the early part of the following year, the colt showed his best form, winning the Lockinge Stakes, Queen Anne Stakes and Eclipse Stakes. He was retired to stud at the end of the year and had considerable success as a sire of winners.

== Background ==
Medicean was a chestnut horse standing 16.1 hands high with a narrow white blaze and a long white sock on his left hind leg bred and owned by the Newmarket-based Cheveley Park Stud. He was sired by Machiavellian, an American-bred, French-trained racehorse who was one of the leading European two-year-olds of his generation, winning the Prix Morny and the Prix de la Salamandre in 1989. He later became a very successful breeding stallion, siring leading winners including Almutawakel, Street Cry and Storming Home.

Medicean' dam Mystic Goddess was a successful racehorse whose wins included the Sweet Solera Stakes in 1992. Mystic Goddess was descended from the broodmare Life Hill, whose other descendants include the Belmont Stakes winner Sherluck and the Poule d'Essai des Poulains winner Caro.

The colt was sent into training with Michael Stoute at his Freemason Lodge stable in Newmarket. Medicean was described by his groom, Angela Perry as being a "quiet and lazy" horse, whilst Brough Scott called him "almost lethargically laid-back".

== Racing career ==
=== 2000: three-year-old season ===
Medicean did not race as a two-year-old: when he arrived at Stoute's stable he was described as resembling "two boards put together" and underwent an operation after developing colic. He made his racecourse debut in April 2000 when he finished third of the twenty-one runners in the Wood Ditton Stakes at Newmarket Racecourse. Nine days later he recorded his first success in a minor stakes race at Sandown Park Racecourse, catching Man o' Mystery in the last stride to win by a short head. On 1 June he was sent north to Ayr Racecourse for another minor stakes and won "readily" from five opponents. Less than three weeks later, Medicean was moved up sharply in class for the Group One St James's Palace Stakes at Royal Ascot. Starting a 16/1 outsider, he exceeded expectations by finishing third, less than a length behind the winner Giant's Causeway. On his next appearance, the colt moved up in distance for the John Smith's Cup, an all-aged handicap race over ten and a half furlongs at York Racecourse. Carrying a weight of 112 pounds he started the 5/2 favourite, despite Stoute's concerns about the soft ground, but made no impression in the race and finished fourteenth of the twenty-two runners.

In his three remaining races of the year, Medicean returned to weight-for-age races and the one mile distance. On 2 August he finished third behind the joint-favourites Giant's Causeway and Dansili in the Group One Sussex Stakes at Goodwood Racecourse, beaten two and a quarter lengths by the winner. At the end of the month, he returned to Goodwood for the Celebration Mile in which he was opposed by the Jersey Stakes winner Observatory and by Bachir, who had defeated Giant's Causeway in the Irish 1,000 Guineas. Ridden by the forty-eight-year-old Pat Eddery, Medicean tracked Bachir before taking the lead three furlongs from the finish. Under a hard ride from Eddery, Medicean recorded his first important success, beating Observatory by a length. On his final race as a three-year-old, he finished fourth behind Observatory, Giant's Causeway and Best of the Bests in the Queen Elizabeth II Stakes at Ascot in September.

=== 2001: four-year-old season ===
Medicean remained in training as a four-year-old in 2001, when he was ridden in all of his races by Kieren Fallon. On his first appearance of the year he contested the Group One Lockinge Stakes over one mile at Newbury Racecourse on 19 May. Fallon restrained the colt towards the rear of the seven runner field before making his challenge in the final furlong. Medicean caught the leaders in the final strides and won in a three-way photo-finish from Warningford and Swallow Flight. Explaining his decision to wait until the last moment to deliver his challenge, Fallon said "He's a horse who needs to be ridden that way. When he hits the front he thinks he's done enough. It was a surprise that he won, because a lot of our horses are just needing the run. I thought he would have, but his ability got him through it." At Royal Ascot in June the colt started at odds of 11/2 for the Queen Anne Stakes (then a Group Two race) in which he carried a five-pound weight penalty following his Group One win. He took the lead two furlongs from the finish and was driven out by Fallon to win by a length from Swallow Flight.

On 7 July, Medicean was one of eight horses to contest the 104th running of the Eclipse Stakes at Sandown. His opponents included Grandera, Tobougg, Black Minnaloushe (winner of the Irish 2,000 Guineas and St James's Palace Stakes) and Endless Hall (winner of the Singapore Airlines International Cup). Racing over ten furlongs for the second time in his racing career, Medicean was held up by Fallon at the back of the field as a very strong pace was set by Broche and Darwin. Medicean moved into contention in the straight, but came under pressure and appeared to be struggling before rallying in the closing stages to win by half a length from Grandera, with Bach in third place. At York Racecourse in August Medicean started 3/1 second favourite for the International Stakes over 10 1/2 furlongs and finished third of the eight runners, eight lengths behind the winner Sakhee.

Medicean was expected to race again in autumn, with the Champion Stakes and the Breeders' Cup Mile regarded as potential targets. In October, he sustained an injury to his right foreleg in training and was retired from racing. Stoute paid tribute to the colt on his retirement, saying: "He was a model of consistency throughout his career and always showed great courage. That's exactly what he showed when winning the Eclipse, but I felt his performance in the Queen Anne with a penalty was outstanding."

== Stud record ==
Medicean was retired from racing to become a breeding stallion at the Cheveley Park Stud where he stood at an initial fee of £15,000. His fee later rose to £30,000 in 2008 but dropped to £6,000 to £8,000 towards the end of his career. He has sired the winner of over 500 races. His major winners include:

=== Notable progeny ===
'c = colt, f = filly, g = gelding

Foaled	Name	Sex	Major Wins
2003	Almerita	f	Preis der Diana
2003	Nannina	f	Fillies' Mile, Coronation Stakes
2004	Al Shemali	c	Dubai Duty Free
2004	Dutch Art	c	Prix Morny, Middle Park Stakes,
2005	Mr Medici	c	Hong Kong Champions & Chater Cup
2007	Capponi	g	Al Maktoum Challenge, Round 3
2007	Neatico	c	Bayerisches Zuchtrennen
2008	Siyouma	f	Sun Chariot Stakes, E. P. Taylor Stakes
2009	Bayrir	g	Secretariat Stakes
2013	Royal Performer	g	Herbie Dyke Stakes

In 2017 Medicean was retired from stud duty after developing fertility problems. He died after a suspected heart attack at Cheveley Park Stud on 30 August 2018. Stud manager Chris Richardson said "His progeny have excelled at the highest level and I'm sure his legacy will be influential for years to come."

== Pedigree ==
Pedigree of Medicean (GB), chestnut stallion, 1997
Sire Machiavellian (USA) 1987	Mr. Prospector (USA); 1970	Raise a Native	Native Dancer
Sire Machiavellian (USA) 1987	Mr. Prospector (USA); 1970	Raise a Native	Raise You
Sire Machiavellian (USA) 1987	Mr. Prospector (USA); 1970	Gold Digger	Nashua
Sire Machiavellian (USA) 1987	Mr. Prospector (USA); 1970	Gold Digger	Sequence
Sire Machiavellian (USA) 1987	Coup de Folie (USA); 1982	Halo	Hail To Reason
Sire Machiavellian (USA) 1987	Coup de Folie (USA); 1982	Halo	Cosmah
Sire Machiavellian (USA) 1987	Coup de Folie (USA); 1982	Raise The Standard (CAN)	Hoist The Flag (USA)
Sire Machiavellian (USA) 1987	Coup de Folie (USA); 1982	Raise The Standard (CAN)	Natalma (USA)
Dam Mystic Goddess (USA) 1990	Storm Bird (CAN); 1978	Northern Dancer	Nearctic
Dam Mystic Goddess (USA) 1990	Storm Bird (CAN); 1978	Northern Dancer	Natalma (USA)
Dam Mystic Goddess (USA) 1990	Storm Bird (CAN); 1978	South Ocean	New Providence
Dam Mystic Goddess (USA) 1990	Storm Bird (CAN); 1978	South Ocean	Shining Sun
Dam Mystic Goddess (USA) 1990	Rose Goddess (IRE); 1979	Sassafras (FR)	Sheshoon (GB)
Dam Mystic Goddess (USA) 1990	Rose Goddess (IRE); 1979	Sassafras (FR)	Ruta
Dam Mystic Goddess (USA) 1990	Rose Goddess (IRE); 1979	Cocarde (GB)	Red God (USA)
Dam Mystic Goddess (USA) 1990	Rose Goddess (IRE); 1979	Cocarde (GB)	Chambord (Family: 3-o)
