= Ayr Racecourse =

Horse racing venue in Ayr, Scotland

Coordinates: 55°27′54″N 4°36′31″W

Ayr
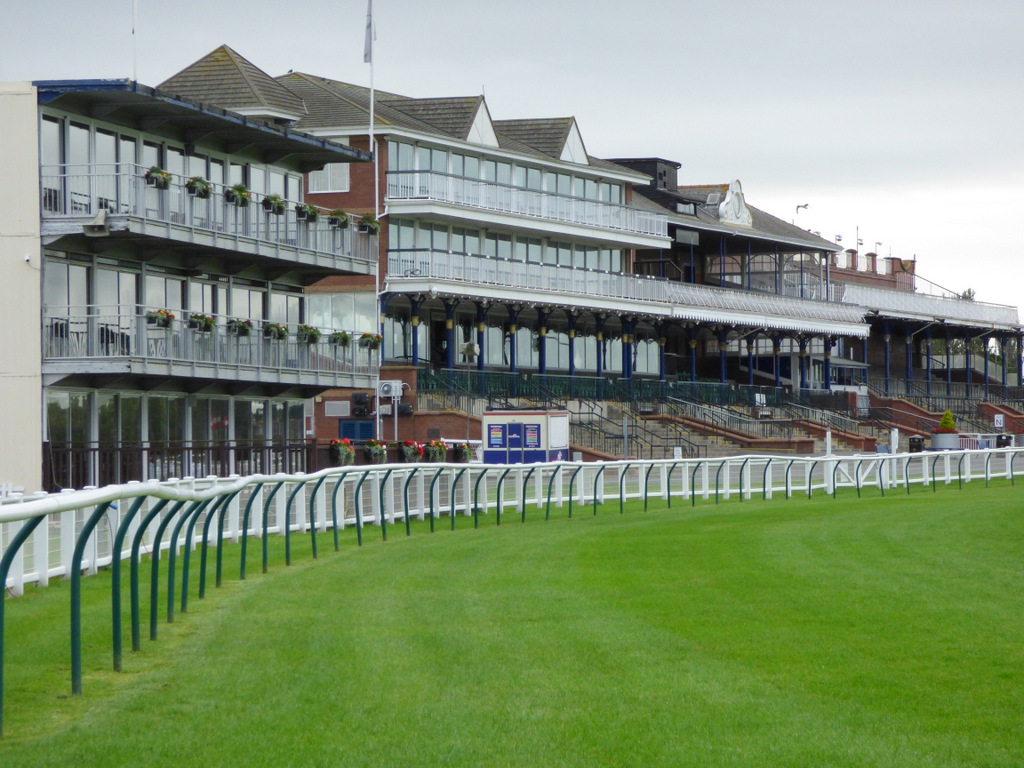
- Interactive map of Ayr
- Location: Ayr, Scotland
- Date opened: 1907
- Screened on: Racing TV
- Course type: Flat; National Hunt
- Notable races: Scottish Grand National; Ayr Gold Cup

Ayr Racecourse at Whitletts Road, Ayr, Scotland, was opened in 1907. There are courses for flat and for National Hunt racing.

== History ==
Horse racing in Ayr dates back to 1576, but the first official meeting did not take place until 1771 at a racecourse situated in the Seafield area of the town. This first racecourse was a mile oval with sharp bends.

In the early days, racing was supported by the local landed gentry and members of the Caledonian Hunt. Important figures in the course's history have included the Earl of Eglinton, Sir James Boswell and the Duke of Portland.

In 1824, Ayr's most important race meeting, the Western Meeting, was established and by 1838 it offered £2000 in prize money and the most valuable two-year-old race of the season in Britain. The meeting's feature race, the Ayr Gold Cup, became a handicap race in 1855 and is now the richest sprint handicap in Europe.

Due to the small size of the original track and the limited paddock space, a new site for the racecourse was eventually needed. In 1907, the course was moved to its current location in the Craigie area of town. After extensive research into other British courses, the new layout was modeled on Newbury's, with the exception that Ayr's straight course is six furlongs rather than a mile. The former racecourse is now playing fields, known as the Old Racecourse, and part of Seafield golf course. Local road names Racecourse Road and Racecourse View also reflect this history.

The Western Club, who owned the course, built the Western House (1919–25) initially as a club house, which later became a hotel and events venue. It is a listed building and an example of Arts and Crafts influenced architecture by Harold Tarbolton.

A jumps track was added in 1950 and in 1966 the Scottish Grand National was transferred to the track after Bogside Racecourse was closed down. It is now regarded as the premier racecourse in Scotland.

Ayr Racecourse hosts numerous race meets throughout the year, but the two primary ones are over jumps in April and on the Flat in September. The Scottish National festival runs for two days every April and is a Grade 3 handicap National Hunt steeplechase race. The Grand National race itself is broadcast live on ITV annually, and more than 20,000 attendees see it live at the track itself. Flat handicap race the Ayr Gold Cup is run over six furlongs every September, with eight races taking place throughout the day.

== Characteristics ==
=== Flat ===
Flat races at Ayr are run over the following distances:

- 5 furlongs
- 6 furlongs
- 7 furlongs 50 yards
- 1 mile
- 1 mile 1 furlong 20 yards
- 10 furlongs
- 1 mile 2 furlongs 192 yards (disused)
- 1 mile 5 furlongs 13 yards
- 1 mile 7 furlongs
- 2 miles 1 furlong 105 yards

The track is a left-handed oval of 12 furlongs including a half mile run in. A six furlong chute joins the round track after just over a furlong. The course is generally flat, with gentle undulations, particularly in the straight. The turns are well graded and it can be regarded as basically a fair track. The turn approaching the straight is slightly downhill, and those prominent can gain an advantage once in line for home. Sprints are held over the straight course. It is a particularly wide course which allows sprints to have fields of up to 28. The jumps course is left-handed with nine fences. There is a steady downhill run to the home turn and a gentle rise to the finish. There is a run-in of 210 yards after the last.

Hurdle races are run over distances of:

- 2 miles 1 furlong
- 2 miles 4 furlongs
- 2 miles 6 furlongs
- 3 miles 110 yards
- 3 miles 2 furlongs 110 yards
- 3 miles 3 furlongs 110 yards

Chases are run over:

- 2 miles
- 2 miles 4 furlongs
- 2 miles 5 furlongs 110 yards
- 3 miles 1 furlong
- 3 miles 2 furlongs 110 yards
- 3 miles 3 furlongs 110 yards
- 3 miles 5 furlongs
- 4 miles 110 yards (Scottish National)

The jumps course is a left-handed one and a half mile circuit with nine fences. It runs downhill to the home turn and thereafter there is a gentle rise to the finish, a run-in of 210 yards. Conditions can get extremely gruelling.

== Facilities ==
The paddock stand at Ayr is named the Rothesay Stand in honour of Charles and Camilla, Duke and Duchess of Rothesay.

== Awards ==
Ayr has been voted Best Racecourse in Scotland and the North East nineteen times by the Racegoers Club, including nine years in a row up until 2013.

It has also won the Neil Wyatt Ground Staff Award for the Best Dual Purpose Course twice – in 1996 and 2011. This award is voted on by representatives of the National Trainers Federation and Professional Jockeys' Association to recognise the achievements of racecourse groundstaff.

In 2012, Ayr was nominated in two categories in the Racecourse Association Showcase Awards – the Food and Beverage and Owners' Experience categories, winning the latter.

It has been designated a five star visitor attraction by VisitScotland.

== Facts and figures ==
=== Flat ===
- Number of fixtures (2016) – 19
- Prize money (2015) – £1,384,100
- Top jockey (2010–2015) – Graham Lee
- Top owner (2010–2015) – Johnie Delta Racing
- Top trainer (2010–2015) – Jim Goldie
- Top trainer (2007 – 2011 inc.) – Richard Fahey, 55 wins from 325 runs

=== Jumps ===
- Top trainer (2007 – 2011 inc.) – Donald McCain, 44 wins from 319 runs

== Notable races ==
Month	DOW	Race Name	Type	Grade	Distance	Age/Sex
April	Saturday	Scottish Grand National	Chase	Grade 3	4m ½f	5yo +
April	Saturday	Scottish Champion Hurdle	Hurdle	Grade 2	2m	4yo +
April	Saturday	Future Champion Novices' Chase	Chase	Grade 2	2m 4f	5yo +
June	Saturday	Land O'Burns Fillies' Stakes	Flat	Listed	5f	3yo + f
September	Friday	Harry Rosebery Stakes	Flat	Listed	5f	2yo only
September	Friday	Arran Scottish Fillies' Sprint Stakes	Flat	Listed	5f 110y	3yo + f
September	Saturday	Doonside Cup	Flat	Listed	1m 2f	3yo +
September	Saturday	Firth of Clyde Stakes	Flat	Group 3	6f	2yo only f
September	Saturday	Ayr Gold Cup	Flat	Handicap	6f	3yo +

Discontinued races

- Scottish Derby (last run in 2005)

== See also ==
- Horseracing in Great Britain
