= Spectrum (horse) =

Irish-bred Thoroughbred racehorse

- Racing colours of Arnold Weinstock
- Sire: Rainbow Quest
- Grandsire: Blushing Groom
- Dam: River Dancer
- Damsire: Irish River
- Sex: Stallion
- Foaled: 8 May 1992
- Country: Ireland
- Colour: Bay
- Breeder: Ballymacoll Stud
- Owner: Simon Weinstock; Arnold Weinstock
- Trainer: Peter Chapple-Hyam
- Record: 9: 4-1-1
- Earnings: £352,081

Major wins
- Irish 2,000 Guineas (1995); Champion Stakes (1995)

Spectrum (8 May 1992 – 25 May 2020) was an Irish-bred, British-trained Thoroughbred racehorse and sire. In a racing career which lasted from October 1994 until August 1996 he ran nine times and won four races. As a three-year-old in 1995 he won the Irish 2000 Guineas but was injured when starting second favourite for The Derby. Big John the bus driver took all odds down from 66/1 and was told by a good source that the horse was injured before it ran. He returned in autumn to win the Champion Stakes over ten furlongs at Newmarket. After a disappointing four-year-old season he was retired to stud where he became a successful sire of winners.

== Background ==
Spectrum was a bay horse with a narrow white star and three white socks bred by Arnold Weinstock's Ballymacoll Stud in County Meath, Ireland. He was sired by Rainbow Quest who won the Prix de l'Arc de Triomphe before becoming a very successful breeding stallion. Rainbow Quest's other progeny included Quest for Fame, Saumarez, Raintrap, Nedawi and Millenary. Spectrum's dam River Dancer never raced but was an influential broodmare who also produced the dams of Conduit and Petrushka.

During his racing career, Spectrum was owned by Arnold Weinstock in partnership with his son Simon. The colt was trained by Peter Chapple-Hyam and ridden in all of his races by John Reid.

== Racing career ==
Spectrum never contested a maiden race, beginning his racing career in the Whatcombe Stakes over one mile on heavy ground at Newbury Racecourse on 22 October 1994. Starting the 8/11 favourite against four opponents, he took the lead two furlongs from the finish and won easily by ten lengths.

On his three-year-old debut, Spectrum ran in the Tudor Stakes at Sandown Park Racecourse on 28 April in which he was opposed by Stiletto Blade, a colt who had finished second in the Royal Lodge Stakes. Starting at odds of 11/10 he took the lead in the last quarter mile and won easily by one and a half lengths from Sanoosea, with Stiletto Blade in third. Three weeks later, Spectrum was sent to Ireland and moved up sharply in class for the Group One Irish 2000 Guineas over one mile at the Curragh. He was made the 100/30 second favourite behind Bahri, a colt who had finished third behind Pennekamp and Celtic Swing in the 2000 Guineas on 6 May. Reid settled the colt just behind the leaders before moving up to take the lead inside the final quarter mile. Spectrum stayed on strongly in the closing stages and won by a length from Adjareli, with Bahri in third. Chapple-Hyam described the winner as "a special horse" and announced that the colt would run next in The Derby.

On 10 June 1995, Spectrum was one of fifteen colts to contest the 218th running of the Derby over one and a half miles at Epsom Downs Racecourse. He was the 5/1 second choice in the betting behind the 11/8 favourite Pennekamp. The colt was held up towards the rear of the field and turned into the straight in tenth place but was unable to make any progress and finished thirteenth behind Lammtarra, beaten more than thirty lengths. He returned from the race with a serious back injury: Chapple Hyam commented "It was touch and go whether he ever ran again".

Spectrum was off the racecourse for more than three months before returning in the Prix du Prince d'Orange over 2000 metres at Longchamp Racecourse on 17 September. He finished second of the five runners, beaten a neck by the Derby runner-up Tamure to whom he was conceding seven pounds. On 14 October, Spectrum contested the Group One Champion Stakes over ten furlongs at Newmarket Racecourse. He started the 5/1 fourth choice in the betting behind Bahri, Tamure and Riyadian. Reid restrained the colt at the back of the eight runner field before moving forward inside the last quarter mile. Spectrum took the lead approaching the final furlong and produced what The Independent's correspondent described as "a scintillating burst of speed" to win by two lengths and a head from Riyadian and Montjoy.

Spectrum remained in training as a four-year-old, but did not replicate his success of 1995. On his debut he was sent to France where he finished fourth to Valanour in the Prix Ganay over 2100m in April. In the following month he started favourite for the Lockinge Stakes over one mile at Newbury but was beaten into third place by Soviet Line and Charnwood Forest. After a three-month break he returned in Juddmonte International Stakes at York Racecourse and made no impression, finishing fifth of the six runners behind Halling

== Stud record ==
Spectrum was retired from racing to become a breeding stallion and stood in Europe, Australia and South Africa. He had some success as a sire of winners, including Golan (2000 Guineas, King George VI and Queen Elizabeth Stakes), Tartan Bearer (Dante Stakes, second in the Derby), Gamut (Grand Prix de Saint-Cloud), Racinger (Prix du Muguet) Just James (Jersey Stakes, Challenge Stakes) and Wild Iris (AJC Oaks). He has also sired several good National Hunt horse including Glencove Marina, winner of the Champion Novice Hurdle. Died on 25 May 2020 in South Africa

== Pedigree ==
Pedigree of Spectrum (IRE), bay stallion, 1992
Sire Rainbow Quest (USA) 1981	Blushing Groom (FR); 1974	Red God	Nasrullah
Sire Rainbow Quest (USA) 1981	Blushing Groom (FR); 1974	Red God	Spring Run
Sire Rainbow Quest (USA) 1981	Blushing Groom (FR); 1974	Runaway Bride	Wild Risk
Sire Rainbow Quest (USA) 1981	Blushing Groom (FR); 1974	Runaway Bride	Aimee
Sire Rainbow Quest (USA) 1981	I Will Follow (USA); 1975	Herbager	Vandale
Sire Rainbow Quest (USA) 1981	I Will Follow (USA); 1975	Herbager	Flagette
Sire Rainbow Quest (USA) 1981	I Will Follow (USA); 1975	Where You Lead	Raise a Native
Sire Rainbow Quest (USA) 1981	I Will Follow (USA); 1975	Where You Lead	Noblesse
Dam River Dancer (IRE) 1983	Irish River (FR); 1976	Riverman	Never Bend
Dam River Dancer (IRE) 1983	Irish River (FR); 1976	Riverman	River Lady
Dam River Dancer (IRE) 1983	Irish River (FR); 1976	Irish Star	Klairon
Dam River Dancer (IRE) 1983	Irish River (FR); 1976	Irish Star	Botany Bay
Dam River Dancer (IRE) 1983	Dancing Shadow (IRE); 1977	Dancer's Image	Native Dancer
Dam River Dancer (IRE) 1983	Dancing Shadow (IRE); 1977	Dancer's Image	Noor's Image
Dam River Dancer (IRE) 1983	Dancing Shadow (IRE); 1977	Sunny Valley	Val de Loir
Dam River Dancer (IRE) 1983	Dancing Shadow (IRE); 1977	Sunny Valley	Sunland (Family:1-l)
