= Rainbow Quest (horse) =

American-bred Thoroughbred racehorse (1981–2007)

- Sire: Blushing Groom
- Grandsire: Red God
- Dam: I Will Follow
- Damsire: Herbager
- Sex: Stallion
- Foaled: 1981
- Country: United States
- Colour: Bay
- Breeder: Alan Clore
- Owner: Khalid Abdullah
- Trainer: Jeremy Tree
- Record: 14: 6-4-2
- Earnings: £482,133

Major wins
- Haynes, Hanson and Clark Conditions Stakes (1983); Great Voltigeur Stakes (1984); Clive Graham Stakes (1985); Coronation Cup (1985); Prix de l'Arc de Triomphe (1985)

Awards
- Leading broodmare sire in Great Britain & Ireland (2003, 2004); Timeform rating: 134
- Last updated on 3 November 2023

Rainbow Quest (1981–2007) was an American-bred, British-trained Thoroughbred racehorse and Champion broodmare sire.

== Background ==
Rainbow Quest was a bay horse with two white socks and a small white star bred in Kentucky by British businessman, Alan Clore. He was sired by Blushing Groom out of the mare I Will Follow. As a yearling, he was purchased by Prince Khalid Abdullah's Juddmonte Farms for $950,000 at the 1982 Fasig-Tipton July Sale.

== Racing career ==
=== 1983: two-year-old season ===
Sent into training with Jeremy Tree, Rainbow Quest began his racing career at Newmarket Racecourse in August 1983 when he defeated twenty-nine opponents in the El Capistrano Stakes. In the following month, he beat nineteen rivals in the Haynes, Hanson and Clark Conditions Stakes over one mile at Newbury Racecourse. In October, Rainbow Quest was matched against El Gran Senor, Siberian Express (winner of the Prix Morny), and Superlative (July Stakes) in the Dewhurst Stakes at Newmarket. El Gran Senor took a lead in the closing stages, but Rainbow Quest cut his advantage back to half a length at the line. In the 1983 International Classification, Rainbow Quest was rated the second best two-year-old in Europe, one pound behind El Gran Senor.

=== 1984: three-year-old season ===
On his three-year-old debut Rainbow Quest was beaten a short-head by Lear Fan in the Craven Stakes and then finished fourth behind El Gran Senor, Chief Singer, and Lear Fan in the 2000 Guineas. He was then diverted from The Derby to the Prix du Jockey Club, in which he finished third behind Darshaan and Sadler's Wells. He was then sent to Ireland, where he finished second in the Irish Derby, beaten a length by El Gran Senor. In August, Rainbow Quest returned to England and recorded a victory in the Great Voltigeur Stakes. On his final appearance of the season, he contested the Prix de l'Arc de Triomphe at Longcamp in October. He was made favourite for the race by British bookmakers but finished eighteenth of the twenty-two runners behind Sagace.

=== 1985: four-year-old season ===
Rainbow Quest began his third season with an easy win in the Clive Graham Stakes at Goodwood Racecourse in May. He then ran in the Coronation Cup at Epsom Downs Racecourse and recorded a win from Old Country. In July, Rainbow Quest finished second to Pebbles in the Eclipse Stakes and third behind Petoski and Oh So Sharp in the King George VI and Queen Elizabeth Stakes. On his final appearance, he ran for the second time in the Prix de l'Arc de Triomphe. He finished a neck behind Sagace but was awarded the race when the French horse was disqualified for causing interference.

== Stud record ==
Rainbow Quest entered stud at his owner's farm in Berkshire, England in 1986. He was moved to the same operation's Banstead Manor Stud near Newmarket in 1986. The horse proved to be an excellent sire.

As a result of irreparable complications following surgery for colic, Rainbow Quest was euthanised on 7 July 2007 at Juddmonte's Banstead Manor Stud near the village of Cheveley in East Cambridgeshire.

=== Major winners ===
c = colt, f = filly, g = gelding

Foaled	Name	Sex	Major wins
1987	Knight's Baroness	f	Irish Oaks
1987	Quest for Fame	c	Epsom Derby, Hollywood Turf Cup
1987	Saumarez	c	Grand Prix de Paris, Prix de l'Arc de Triomphe
1988	Sought Out	f	Prix du Cadran
1990	Armiger	c	Racing Post Trophy
1990	Raintrap	c	Prix Royal-Oak, Canadian International Stakes
1990	Urgent Request	c	Santa Anita Handicap
1991	Rainbow Dancer	c	Hollywood Invitational Turf Handicap, Oak Tree Turf Championship Stakes
1991	Sakura Laurel	c	Tenno Sho, Arima Kinen
1991	Sunshack	c	Critérium de Saint-Cloud, Prix Royal-Oak, Coronation Cup
1992	Spectrum	c	Irish 2,000 Guineas, Champion Stakes
1994	Fiji	f	Yellow Ribbon Stakes, Gamely Stakes
1995	Croco Rouge	c	Prix Lupin, Prix d'Ispahan
1995	Nedawi	c	St Leger
1996	Edabiya	f	Moyglare Stud Stakes
1997	Millenary	c	St Leger
2006	Crowded House	c	Racing Post Trophy
2008	Colour Vision	g	Ascot Gold Cup

=== Broodmare sire ===
Rainbow Quest was the Leading broodmare sire in Great Britain & Ireland in 2003 and 2004. Among his daughters' top runners were:

c = colt, f = filly, g = gelding

Foaled	Name	Sex	Major wins
1998	Rebelline	f	Tattersalls Gold Cup
1999	Marotta	f	Prix Saint-Alary
1999	Rakti	c	Derby Italiano, Premio Presidente della Repubblica, Champion Stakes, Prince of Wales Stakes, Lockinge Stakes
2000	Kris Kin	c	Epsom Derby
2000	Powerscourt	c	Tattersalls Gold Cup, Arlington Million
2001	North Light	c	Epsom Derby
2002	Auroras Encore	g	Grand National
2002	Footstepsinthesand	c	2000 Guineas Stakes
2005	Look Here	f	Epsom Oaks
2006	Elusive Wave	f	Poule d'Essai des Poulains
2013	Qemah	f	Coronation Stakes, Prix Rothschild
2019	Ask Victor More	c	Kikuka-shō

== Pedigree ==
Pedigree of Rainbow Quest (USA), bay stallion 1981
Sire Blushing Groom (FR) 1974	Red God (USA); 1954	Nasrullah	Nearco
Sire Blushing Groom (FR) 1974	Red God (USA); 1954	Nasrullah	Mumtaz Begum
Sire Blushing Groom (FR) 1974	Red God (USA); 1954	Spring Run	Menow
Sire Blushing Groom (FR) 1974	Red God (USA); 1954	Spring Run	Boola Brook
Sire Blushing Groom (FR) 1974	Runaway Bride (GB); 1962	Wild Risk	Rialto
Sire Blushing Groom (FR) 1974	Runaway Bride (GB); 1962	Wild Risk	Wild Violet
Sire Blushing Groom (FR) 1974	Runaway Bride (GB); 1962	Aimee	Tudor Minstrel
Sire Blushing Groom (FR) 1974	Runaway Bride (GB); 1962	Aimee	Emali
Dam I Will Follow (USA) 1975	Herbager (FR); 1954	Vandale	Plassy
Dam I Will Follow (USA) 1975	Herbager (FR); 1954	Vandale	Vanille
Dam I Will Follow (USA) 1975	Herbager (FR); 1954	Flagette	Escamillo
Dam I Will Follow (USA) 1975	Herbager (FR); 1954	Flagette	Fidgette
Dam I Will Follow (USA) 1975	Where You Lead (USA); 1970	Raise a Native	Native Dancer
Dam I Will Follow (USA) 1975	Where You Lead (USA); 1970	Raise a Native	Raise You
Dam I Will Follow (USA) 1975	Where You Lead (USA); 1970	Noblesse	Mossborough
Dam I Will Follow (USA) 1975	Where You Lead (USA); 1970	Noblesse	Duke's Delight
