= Prix Morny =

- Class: Group 1
- Location: Deauville Racecourse; Deauville, France
- Inaugurated: 1865
- Race type: Flat / Thoroughbred
- Sponsor: Darley
- Website: france-galop.com

Race information
- Distance: 1,200 metres (6f)
- Surface: Turf
- Track: Straight
- Qualification: Two-year-olds excluding geldings
- Weight: 57 kg Allowances; 1½ kg for fillies
- Purse: €350,000 (2022); 1st: €199,990

Prix Morny
2026
Senorita Bonita	Carry The Flag	Kosuma

Previous years
2025
Venetian Sun	Gstaad	Wise Approach
2024
Whistlejacket	Rashabar	Daylight
2023
Vandeek	Ramatuelle	River Tiber
2022
Blackbeard	Persian Force	The Antarctic
2021
Perfect Power	Trident	Asymmetric

2020-2011
2020
Campanelle	Nando Parrado	Rhythm Master
2019
Earthlight	Raffle Prize	Golden Horde
2018
Pretty Pollyanna	Signora Cabello	True Mason
2017
Unfortunately	Havana Grey	Different League
2016
Lady Aurelia	Alrahma	Peace Envoy
2015
Shalaa	Gutaifan	Tourny
2014
The Wow Signal	Hootenanny	Ervedya
2013
No Nay Never	Vorda	Rizeena
2012
Reckless Abandon	George Vancouver	Parliament Square
2011
Dabirsim	Family One	Vladimir

2010–2001
2010
Dream Ahead	Tin Horse	Pontenuovo
2009
Arcano	Special Duty	Canford Cliffs
2008
Bushranger	Gallagher	Lord Shanakill
2007
Myboycharlie	Natagora	Alexandros
2006
Dutch Art	Magic America	Excellent Art
2005
Silca's Sister	Ivan Denisovich	Always Hopeful
2004
Divine Proportions	Layman	Russian Blue
2003
Whipper	Much Faster	Denebola
2002
Elusive City	Zafeen	Loving Kindness
2001
Johannesburg	Zipping	Meshaheer

2000–1990
2000
Bad As I Wanna Be	Noverre	Rolly Polly
1999
Fasliyev	Warm Heart	Bachir
1998
Orpen	Exeat	Golden Silca
1997
Charge D'Affaires	Xaar	Heeremandi
1996
Bahamian Bounty	Zamindar	Pas De Reponse
1995
Tagula	With Fascination	Barricade
1994
Hoh Magic	Bruttina	Tereshkova
1993
Coup De Genie	Psychobabble	Spain Lane
1992
Zafonic	Secrage	Marina Park
1991
Arazi	Kenbu	Lion Cavern
1990
Hector Protector	Divine Danse	Acteur Francais

The Prix Morny is a Group 1 flat horse race in France open to two-year-old thoroughbred colts and fillies. It is run at Deauville over a distance of 1,200 metres (about 6 furlongs), and it is scheduled to take place each year in August.

== History ==
The event is named in memory of Auguste de Morny (1811–1865), the founder of Deauville Racecourse. It was established in 1865, and it was originally called the Prix de Morny. The inaugural race was over 1,000 metres, and the prize for the winning owner was 9,150 francs.

The second and third runnings of the Prix de Morny were contested over 1,200 metres. It was extended to 1,300 metres in 1868, and to 1,400 metres in 1870.

The race became known as the Prix de Deux Ans in 1871, and its distance was cut to 1,200 metres in 1887. It was renamed the Prix Morny, a shortened version of its original title, in 1911.

The Prix Morny was abandoned from 1914 to 1918, and again in 1940. Its usual venue was closed during World War II, so it was held temporarily at Longchamp (1941–42, 1944) and Maisons-Laffitte (1943, 1945). The first two editions at Longchamp were run over 1,000 metres, and the 1944 running was contested over 1,300 metres.

The event opened to foreign horses in 1947, and that year's race was won by a British colt named Delirium. An earlier spell as an international race (1875 to 1908) had yielded no foreign winners.

== Records ==
Leading jockey (10 wins):

- George Stern – Eperon (1900), Farnus (1901), Vinicius (1902), Val d'Or (1904), Mehari (1908), Porte Maillot (1911), Marka (1912), Durzetta (1920), Zariba (1921), Banstar (1925)

Leading trainer (8 wins):

- Robert Denman – Present Times (1884), Frapotel (1886), Farnus (1901), Vinicius (1902), Val d'Or (1904), Mehari (1908), Porte Maillot (1911), Marka (1912)

Leading owner (13 wins):

- Marcel Boussac – Durzetta (1920), Zariba (1921), Banstar (1925), Cecias (1932), Corrida (1934), Semiramide (1938), Esmeralda (1941), Coaraze (1944), Nirgal (1945), Cadir (1946), Auriban (1951), Cordova (1953), Apollonia (1955)

== Winners since 1968 ==
Year	Winner	Jockey	Trainer	Owner	Time
1968	Princeline	Maurice Philipperon	John Cunnington Jr.	Mrs Pierre Ribes	1:16.4
1969	Amber Rama	Yves Saint-Martin	François Mathet	Arpad Plesch	1:10.4
1970	My Swallow	Lester Piggott	Paul Davey	David Robinson	1:17.7
1971	Daring Display	Freddy Head	William Head	Lady Granard	1:13.7
1972	Filiberto	Jean Cruguet	Angel Penna Sr.	Countess Batthyany	1:10.8
1973	Nonoalco	Lester Piggott	François Boutin	María Félix Berger	1:10.8
1974	Broadway Dancer	Yves Saint-Martin	Angel Penna Sr.	Daniel Wildenstein	1:11.7
1975	Vitiges	Gérard Rivases	Gérard Philippeau	Mrs Marc Laloum	1:11.4
1976	Blushing Groom	Henri Samani	François Mathet	HH Aga Khan IV	1:12.4
1977	Super Concorde	Philippe Paquet	François Boutin	Walter Haefner	1:12.0
1978	Irish River	Maurice Philipperon	John Cunnington Jr.	Mrs Raymond Adès	1:12.7
1979	Princesse Lida	Freddy Head	Alec Head	Jacques Wertheimer	1:11.7
1980	Ancien Régime	Maurice Philipperon	John Fellows	Robin Scully	1:10.1
1981	Green Forest	Alfred Gibert	Mitri Saliba	Mahmoud Fustok	1:11.9
1982	Deep Roots	Willie Carson	Pascal Bary	Corine Barande-Barbe	1:11.1
1983	Siberian Express	Alfred Gibert	Mitri Saliba	Mahmoud Fustok	1:10.1
1984	Seven Springs	Gary W. Moore	John Fellows	Robin Scully	1:09.9
1985	Regal State	Darren Beadman	John Fellows	Robin Scully	1:12.6
1986	Sakura Reiko	Éric Legrix	Patrick Biancone	Enshoku Zen	1:14.5
1987	First Waltz	Maurice Philipperon	Edouard Bartholomew	Sir Robin McAlpine	1:12.8
1988	Tersa	Gérald Mossé	François Boutin	Allen Paulson	1:15.6
1989	Machiavellian	Freddy Head	François Boutin	Stavros Niarchos	1:12.8
1990	Hector Protector	Freddy Head	François Boutin	Stavros Niarchos	1:14.4
1991	Arazi	Gérald Mossé	François Boutin	Allen Paulson	1:13.3
1992	Zafonic	Pat Eddery	André Fabre	Khalid Abdullah	1:14.8
1993	Coup de Genie	Cash Asmussen	François Boutin	Stavros Niarchos	1:13.1
1994	Hoh Magic	Michael Hills	Michael Bell	David Allport	1:11.7
1995	Tagula	Walter Swinburn	Ian Balding	R. & E. Hitchins	1:11.6
1996	Bahamian Bounty	Frankie Dettori	David Loder	Lucayan Stud	1:11.0
1997	Chargé d'Affaires	Gérald Mossé	Alain de Royer-Dupré	Marquesa de Moratalla	1:12.7
1998	Orpen	Michael Kinane	Aidan O'Brien	Sue Magnier	1:10.5
1999	Fasliyev	Michael Kinane	Aidan O'Brien	Tabor / Magnier	1:11.0
2000	Bad As I Wanna Be	Gérald Mossé	Brian Meehan	Joe Allbritton	1:10.3
2001	Johannesburg	Michael Kinane	Aidan O'Brien	Tabor / Magnier	1:10.4
2002	Elusive City	Kieren Fallon	Gerard Butler	Thoroughbred Corp.	1:10.4
2003	Whipper	Sébastien Maillot	Robert Collet	Elias Zaccour	1:14.0
2004	Divine Proportions	Christophe Lemaire	Pascal Bary	Niarchos Family	1:12.8
2005	Silca's Sister	Ted Durcan	Mick Channon	Aldridge Racing Ltd	1:12.0
2006	Dutch Art	Christophe Soumillon	Peter Chapple-Hyam	Susan Roy	1:13.6
2007	Myboycharlie	Kieren Fallon	Tommy Stack	Sue Magnier	1:13.1
2008	Bushranger	Johnny Murtagh	David Wachman	Smith / Magnier / Tabor	1:09.9
2009	Arcano	Richard Hills	Brian Meehan	Hamdan Al Maktoum	1:07.9
2010	Dream Ahead	William Buick	David Simcock	Khalifa Dasmal	1:09.6
2011	Dabirsim	Frankie Dettori	Christophe Ferland	Simon Springer	1:10.0
2012	Reckless Abandon	Gérald Mossé	Clive Cox	Deadman / Barrow	1:09.6
2013	No Nay Never	David Flores	Wesley Ward	Magnier / Tabor / Smith	1:09.82
2014	The Wow Signal	Frankie Dettori	John Quinn	Al Shaqab Racing	1:11.93
2015	Shalaa	Frankie Dettori	John Gosden	Al Shaqab Racing	1:13:31
2016	Lady Aurelia	Frankie Dettori	Wesley Ward	Stonestreet / Bolton / Leidel	1:10:61
2017	Unfortunately	Tony Piccone	Karl Burke	Laughton / Burke	1:08.92
2018	Pretty Pollyanna	Silvestre de Sousa	Michael Bell	T & W Gredley	1:10.24
2019	Earthlight	Mickael Barzalona	André Fabre	Godolphin	1:12.00
2020	Campanelle	Frankie Dettori	Wesley Ward	Stonestreet Stables LLC	1:11.80
2021	Perfect Power	Christophe Soumillon	Richard Fahey	Rashid Dalmook Al Maktoum	1:10.81
2022	Blackbeard	Ryan Moore	Aidan O'Brien	Derrick Smith, Magnier, Tabor & Westerberg	1:09.91
2023	Vandeek	Andrea Atzeni	Simon & Ed Crisford	KHK Racing Ltd	1:09.84
2024	Whistlejacket	Ryan Moore	Aidan O'Brien	Brant, Smith, Magnier & Tabor	1:11.02
2025	Venetian Sun	Clifford Lee	Karl Burke	Tony Bloom & Ian McAleavy	1:08.39
2026	Senorita Bonita	Oisin Murphy	Simon & Ed Crisford	Victorious Forever	1:08.79

== Earlier winners ==
- 1865: Puebla
- 1866: Le Petit Caporal
- 1867: Marcello
- 1868: Masaniello
- 1869: Roquefort
- 1870: Eole
- 1871: Seul
- 1872: Flageolet
- 1873: Perla
- 1874: Macaron
- 1875: Fusion
- 1876: Astree
- 1877: Mantille
- 1878: Swift
- 1879: Louis d'Or
- 1880: Strelitz
- 1881: Favorite
- 1882: Chitre
- 1883: Directrice
- 1884: Present Times
- 1885: Alger
- 1886: Frapotel
- 1887: Widgeon
- 1888: Fontanas
- 1889: Cromatella
- 1890: Zingaro
- 1891: Ranes
- 1892: Marly
- 1893: Fresca
- 1894: Le Sagittaire
- 1895: Daphnis
- 1896: Indian Chief
- 1897: Washington
- 1898: Justitia
- 1899: Lucie
- 1900: Eperon
- 1901: Farnus
- 1902: Vinicius
- 1903: Theleme
- 1904: Val d'Or
- 1905: Prestige
- 1906: Sagamore
- 1907: Valda
- 1908: Mehari
- 1909: Messidor
- 1910: Manfred
- 1911: Porte Maillot
- 1912: Marka
- 1913: Sardanapale
- 1914–18: no race
- 1919: Sourbier
- 1920: Durzetta
- 1921: Zariba
- 1922: Mackenzie
- 1923: Golden Hope
- 1924: La Habanera
- 1925: Banstar
- 1926: Fairy Legend
- 1927: Kantar
- 1928: Necklace
- 1929: Chateau Bouscaut
- 1930: Pearl Cap
- 1931: Eadhild
- 1932: Cecias
- 1933: Brantôme
- 1934: Corrida
- 1935: Mistress Ford
- 1936: Tizona
- 1937: Ad Astra
- 1938: Semiramide
- 1939: Furane
- 1940: no race
- 1941: Esmeralda
- 1942: Fanatique
- 1943: Sampiero
- 1944: Coaraze
- 1945: Nirgal
- 1946: Cadir
- 1947: Delirium
- 1948: Amour Drake
- 1949: Ksarinor
- 1950: Sanguine
- 1951: Auriban
- 1952: Bozet
- 1953: Cordova
- 1954: Chingacgook
- 1955: Apollonia
- 1956: Mr Pickwick
- 1957: Neptune
- 1958: Oceanic
- 1959: Pharamond
- 1960: Solitude
- 1961: Prudent
- 1962: Darannour
- 1963: Revoquee
- 1964: Grey Dawn
- 1965: Soleil
- 1966: Le Conquerant
- 1967: Madina

== See also ==
- List of French flat horse races
- Recurring sporting events established in 1865 – this race is included under its original title, Prix de Morny.
