= Machiavellian (horse) =

American-bred Thoroughbred racehorse

- Sire: Mr. Prospector
- Grandsire: Raise A Native
- Dam: Coup de Folie
- Damsire: Halo
- Sex: Stallion
- Foaled: 31 January 1987
- Country: United States
- Colour: Bay
- Owner: Stavros Niarchos
- Trainer: François Boutin
- Record: 7:4-1-0
- Earnings: £201,327

Major wins
- Prix Morny (1989); Prix de la Salamandre (1989); Prix Djebel (1990)

Machiavellian (31 January 1987 – 27 June 2004) was an American-bred Thoroughbred racehorse and sire. In a racing career which lasted from August 1989 to August 1990 he ran seven times and won four races. He was the leading French two-year-old of 1989 when he was unbeaten in three races including the Group One Prix Morny and Prix de la Salamandre. He later became a highly successful sire of winners.

== Background ==
Machiavellian was a bay horse sired by the outstanding American stallion Mr Prospector. Machiavellian's dam Coup de Folie produced several important winners including Coup de Genie (Prix Morny), Exit To Nowhere (Prix Jacques le Marois) and Hydro Calido (Prix d'Astarte).

== Racing career ==
Machiavellian began his racing career by winning the Prix Yacowlef at Deauville on 3 August 1989. Seventeen days later he was moved up to Group One level to contest the Prix Morny over the same course and distance. Ridden by Freddy Head, he won by two lengths from Qirmazi. Three weeks later he was moved up in distance for the Prix de la Salamandre at Longchamp Racecourse over 1400m. He won the race by half a length from Qirmazi.

Machiavellian began his three-year-old season by winning the Prix Djebel, beating the sprinter Ron's Victory by two and a half lengths. At Newmarket Racecourse on 5 May, Machiavellian started 6/4 favourite for the 2000 Guineas. He finished second, beaten two lengths by Tirol. In the Irish 2000 Guineas two weeks later he finished fourth to Tirol. On his final start, he finished last of the five runners in the Prix Maurice de Gheest behind the English filly Dead Certain.

== Stud career ==
Machiavellian was based throughout his stud career at the Dalham Hall Stud at Newmarket. He sired the winners of races worth more than £6M in prize money. His best winners included Street Cry, Almutawakel, Medicean, West Wind, Storming Home and Chic. Pensioned from stud duties in 2004 because of laminitis. Euthanized on 27 June 2004 due to laminitis.

== Cultural references ==
Machiavellian was the subject of a painting by Mark Wallinger entitled Half-Brother (Exit to Nowhere – Machiavellian).

== Pedigree ==
Pedigree of Machiavellian (USA), bay stallion, 1987
Sire Mr Prospector (USA) 1970	Raise a Native (USA); 1961	Native Dancer	Polynesian
Sire Mr Prospector (USA) 1970	Raise a Native (USA); 1961	Native Dancer	Geisha
Sire Mr Prospector (USA) 1970	Raise a Native (USA); 1961	Raise You	Case Ace
Sire Mr Prospector (USA) 1970	Raise a Native (USA); 1961	Raise You	Lady Glory
Sire Mr Prospector (USA) 1970	Gold Digger (USA); 1962	Nashua	Nasrullah
Sire Mr Prospector (USA) 1970	Gold Digger (USA); 1962	Nashua	Segula
Sire Mr Prospector (USA) 1970	Gold Digger (USA); 1962	Sequence	Count Fleet
Sire Mr Prospector (USA) 1970	Gold Digger (USA); 1962	Sequence	Miss Dogwood
Dam Coup de Folie (USA) 1982	Halo (USA); 1969	Hail To Reason	Turn-To
Dam Coup de Folie (USA) 1982	Halo (USA); 1969	Hail To Reason	Nothirdchance
Dam Coup de Folie (USA) 1982	Halo (USA); 1969	Cosmah	Cosmic Bomb
Dam Coup de Folie (USA) 1982	Halo (USA); 1969	Cosmah	Almahmoud
Dam Coup de Folie (USA) 1982	Raise the Standard (CAN); 1978	Hoist the Flag	Tom Rolfe
Dam Coup de Folie (USA) 1982	Raise the Standard (CAN); 1978	Hoist the Flag	Wavy Navy
Dam Coup de Folie (USA) 1982	Raise the Standard (CAN); 1978	Natalma	Native Dancer
Dam Coup de Folie (USA) 1982	Raise the Standard (CAN); 1978	Natalma	Almahmoud
