= Auguste Rodin (horse) =

Irish Thoroughbred racehorse

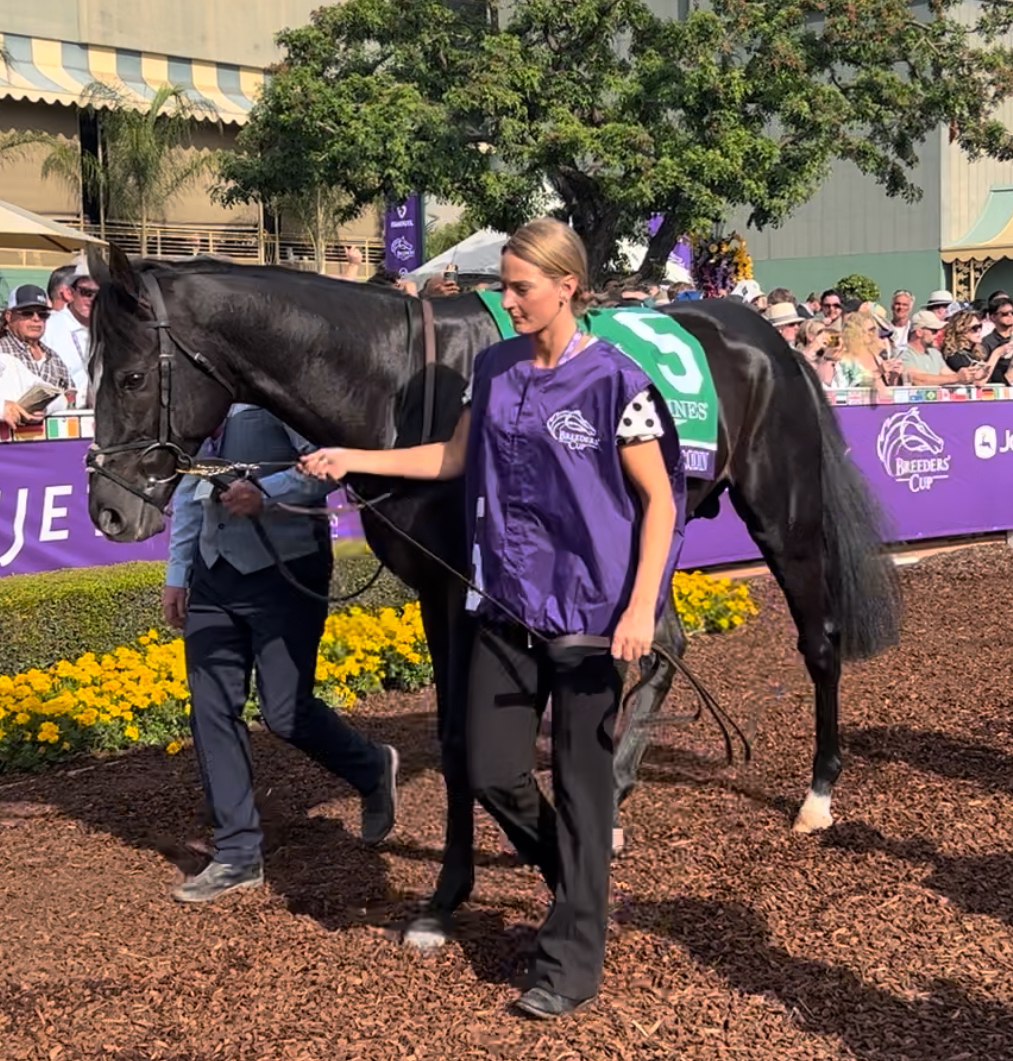
- Auguste Rodin being led in the paddock before the 2023 Breeders Cup Turf
- Sire: Deep Impact
- Grandsire: Sunday Silence
- Dam: Rhododendron
- Damsire: Galileo
- Sex: Colt
- Foaled: 26 January 2020
- Country: Ireland
- Colour: Bay
- Breeder: Coolmore Stud
- Owner: Michael Tabor, Derrick Smith, Sue Magnier & Westerberg
- Trainer: Aidan O'Brien
- Record: 16: 8 - 3 - 0
- Earnings: US$$5,825,350

Major wins
- Juvenile Stakes (2022); Vertem Futurity Trophy (2022); Epsom Derby (2023); Irish Derby (2023); Irish Champion Stakes (2023); Breeders' Cup Turf (2023); Prince of Wales's Stakes (2024); Timeform rating: 129
- Last updated on 24 November 2024

Auguste Rodin (foaled 26 January 2020) is a multiple-Group 1 winning Irish-bred Thoroughbred racehorse. In 2022 he won three of his four races, including the Vertem Futurity Trophy. In the following year he won the Epsom Derby, Irish Derby, Irish Champion Stakes and Breeders' Cup Turf. As a four-year-old he continued his brilliant form winning the Group 1 Prince of Wales's Stakes at Royal Ascot.

== Background ==
Auguste Rodin is a bay colt, with a white blaze and a white sock on his left hind leg, bred in Ireland by the Coolmore Stud. He raced in the ownership of the Coolmore partners Michael Tabor, Sue Magnier and Derrick Smith in association with Georg von Opel's Westerberg organization. The colt was sent into training with Aidan O'Brien at Ballydoyle.

He is from the thirteenth crop of foals sired by Japanese Triple Crown champion Deep Impact, who was the Japanese Horse of the Year in 2005 and 2006. Auguste Rodin is the first foal produced by Rhododendron, whose wins included the Fillies' Mile, Prix de l'Opéra and Lockinge Stakes. Rhododendron's dam Halfway to Heaven won the Irish 1,000 Guineas, Nassau Stakes and Sun Chariot Stakes in 2008. and was a descendant of the Kentucky Oaks winner Native S.

== Racing career ==
=== 2022: two-year-old season ===
Auguste Rodin began his track career in a seven-furlong maiden race at the Curragh on 1 June when he started the 4/6 favourite but finished second to Crypto Force, beaten two and a half lengths. A month later the colt started odds-on favourite for a similar event at Naas Racecourse. Ridden by Seamie Heffernan he won "comfortably" by two lengths from Shadowed. The colt was then stepped up in class for the Group 2 Juvenile Stakes over one mile on soft ground at Leopardstown Racecourse on 10 September when he was ridden by Ryan Moore and started 11/10 favourite in a six-runner field. After tracking the leaders he took the lead a furlong out and despite hanging to the right in the closing stages he stayed on well to win by one and a half lengths from Caroline Street. After the race, Aidan O'Brien commented "He's always showed a lot and has a beautiful physique, a lovely nature... He was a little idle when he got to the front, but we're delighted with him. He's always gone through his work very impressively. He has plenty of class and quality, and probably will sharpen up a lot from today. We thought he could be the type of horse to do both the Guineas and the Derby".

For his final run of the season, Auguste Rodin was sent to England to contest the Group 1 Vertem Futurity Trophy, winning "readily" by three and a half lengths.

In the official two-year-old ratings for 2022, Auguste Rodin was rated the equal fourth-best juvenile of the season in Europe, behind Little Big Bear, Blackbeard and Chaldean.

=== 2023: three-year-old season ===
In the early part of 2023 there was speculation that Auguste Rodin would become the first horse since Nijinsky to complete the Triple Crown by winning the 2000 Guineas, Derby and St Leger.

On 6 May Auguste Rodin began his second season in the 2000 Guineas, eventually coming in twelfth, more than twenty lengths behind the winner Chaldean.

The 244th running of the Derby took place over one and a half miles on good to firm ground at Epsom Racecourse on 3 June and Auguste Rodin started the 9/2 second favourite behind the Chester Vase winner Arrest. The other twelve contenders included Military Order (Lingfield Derby Trial), The Foxes (Dante Stakes), White Birch (Ballysax Stakes), Sprewell (Derby Trial Stakes), San Antonio (Dee Stakes) and Dubai Mile (Criterium de Saint-Cloud). Ridden by Moore, Auguste Rodin caught the leader 100 yards from the finish and won by three quarters of a length.

Auguste Rodin made his next start in the Group 1 King George VI and Queen Elizabeth Stakes on 29 July. After running in midfield for most of the race, the "first moment of drama in the race came on the home turn" as the 9/4 favourite Auguste Rodin dropped out into the back of the field and was eased home last, beaten by more than 100 lengths by the winner, Hukum.

Auguste Rodin was then entered into the Irish Champion Stakes on September 9 where he won against Luxembourg.

Auguste Rodin was then sent to the United States to contest the Breeders' Cup Turf held at Santa Anita Park on November 4. The horse won the race, beating Up to the Mark by a 3/4 length margin.

=== 2024: four-year old season ===
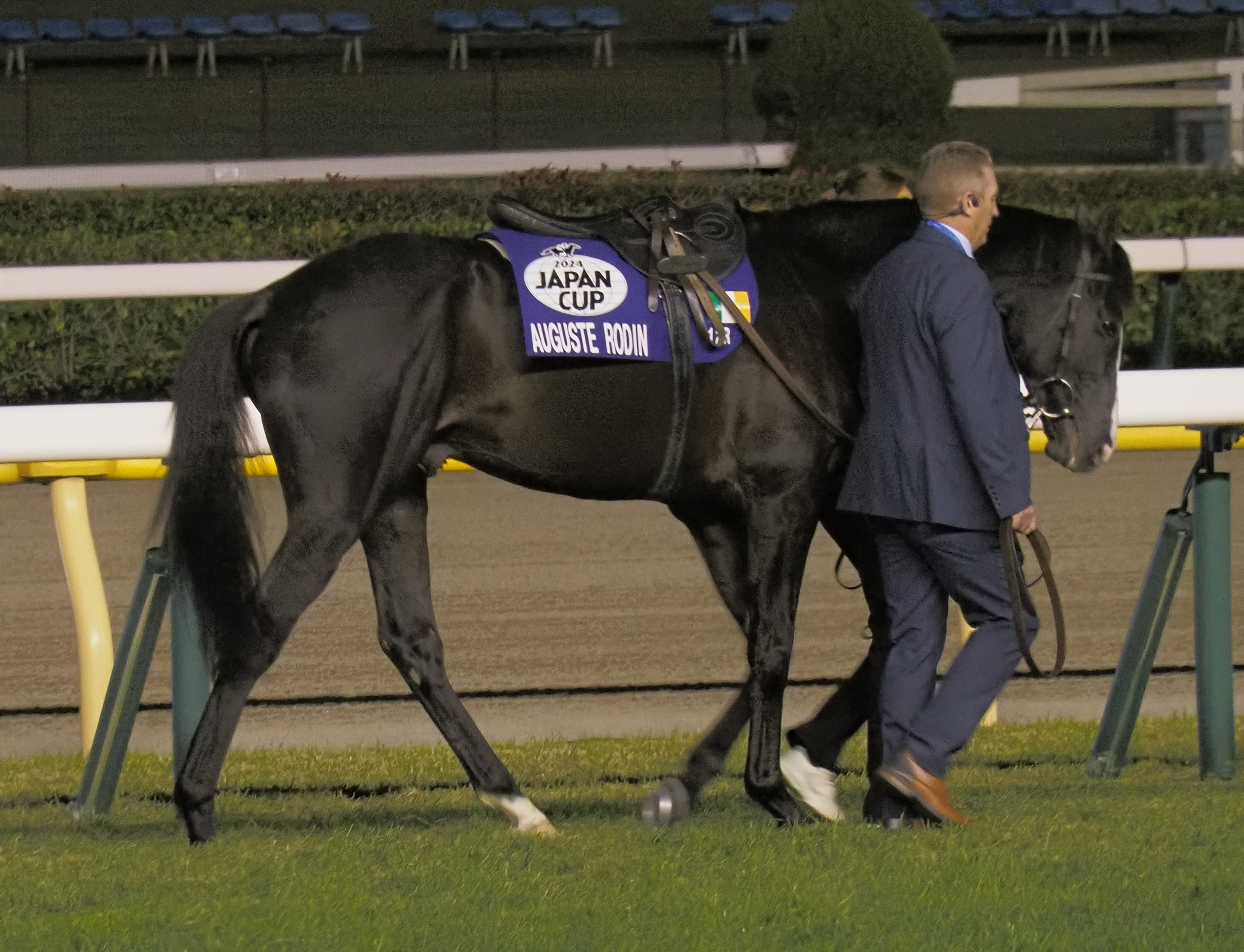
Auguste Rodin at his retirement ceremony

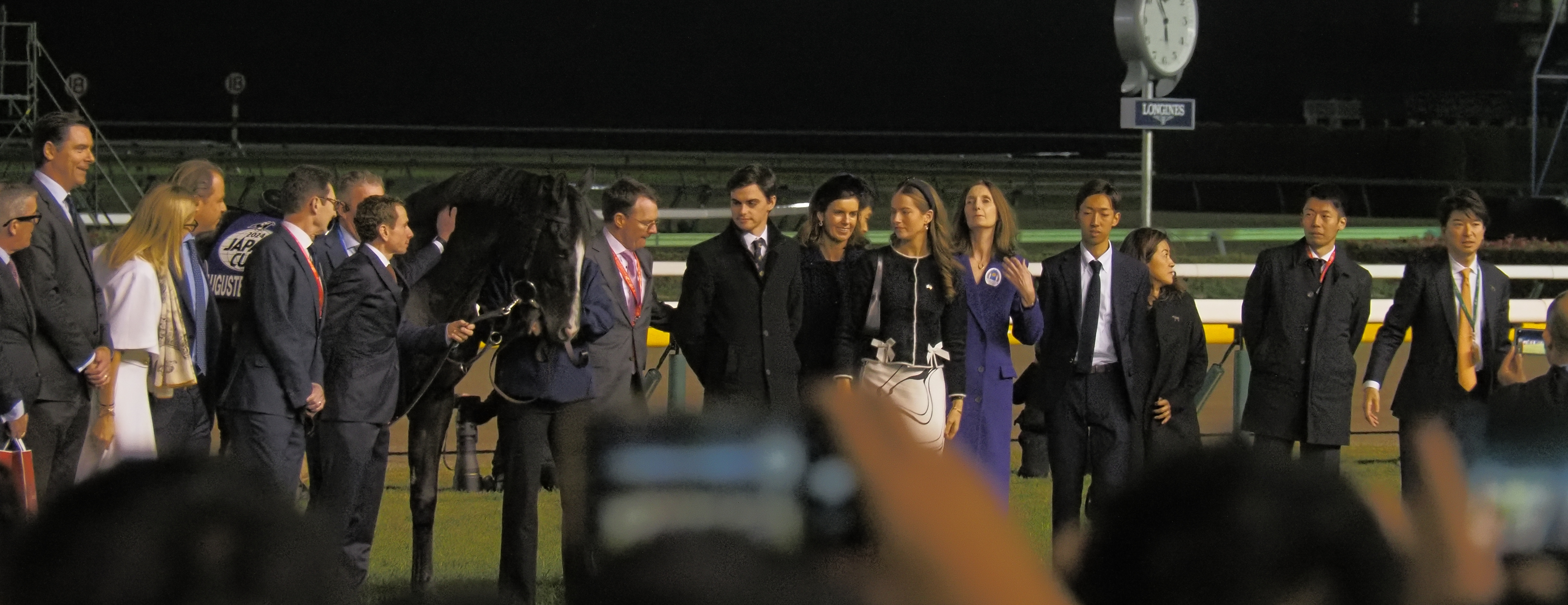
Auguste Rodin at his retirement ceremony

Auguste Rodin was sent to Dubai to contest the year's Dubai Sheema Classic as his first race of the season. However, the horse finished last to Rebel's Romance. He was later entered in to the Tattersalls Gold Cup but finished second behind White Birch.

Later on, Auguste Rodin won his first victory of the season in the race at the Prince of Wales's Stakes, which marked his 6th Group I race in his career. Following this victory, he was entered in to the King George VI and Queen Elizabeth Stakes and Irish Champion Stakes, but did not win either, having finished fifth and second respectively.

On September 27, it was announced that the horse would be retired from racing to stand stud at Coolmore Stud after that year's Japan Cup, which was to be held at Tokyo Racecourse on November 24. It was also later announced that a retirement ceremony for the horse would be held after the race.

At the Japan Cup, Auguste Rodin finished eighth behind Do Deuce, who was ridden by his sire's jockey, Yutaka Take. Following the race, Auguste Rodin's retirement ceremony was held as previously announced. This was the first time in Japanese horse racing history where a foreign-trained horse was given a retirement ceremony in Japan.

== Statistics ==
Date	Distance	Race	Grade/ Group	Track	Odds	Field	Finish	Winning Time	Winning (Losing) Margin	Jockey	Winner (2nd place)	Ref
2022 – two-year-old season
1 Jun 2022	7 furlongs	Maiden		The Curragh	4/6*	9	2	1:29.11	(2 1/4 lengths)	Ryan Moore	Crypto Force	
2 Jul 2022	7 furlongs	Maiden		Naas	30/100*	13	1	1:31.53	2 lengths	Seamie Heffernan	(Shadowed)	
10 Sep 2022	1 mile	Champions Juvenile Stakes	II	Leopardstown	11/10*	5	1	1:45.25	1 1/2 lengths	Ryan Moore	(Caroline Street)	
22 Oct 2022	1 mile	Vertem Futurity Trophy	I	Doncaster	9/4*	8	1	1:44:76	3 1/2 lengths	Ryan Moore	(Epictetus)	
2023 – three-year-old season
6 May 2023	1 mile	2000 Guineas	I	Newmarket	13/8*	14	12	1:41.64	(22 lengths)	Ryan Moore	Chaldean	
3 Jun 2023	1m 4f 6y	Epsom Derby	I	Epsom Downs	9/2	14	1	2:33.88	1/2 length	Ryan Moore	(King of Steel)	
2 Jul 2023	1 1/2 miles	Irish Derby	I	The Curragh	4/11*	9	1	2:33.24	1 1/2 lengths	Ryan Moore	(Adelaide River)	
29 Jul 2023	1m 3f 211y	King George VI and Queen Elizabeth Stakes	I	Ascot	9/4*	10	10	2:33.95	eased	Ryan Moore	Hukum	
9 Sep 2023	1 1/4 miles	Irish Champion Stakes	I	Leopardstown	11/4*	8	1	2:02.68	1/2 length	Ryan Moore	Luxembourg	
4 Nov 2023	1 1/2 miles	Breeders' Cup Turf	I	Santa Anita	2.50*	11	1	2:24.30	3/4 length	Ryan Moore	(Up to the Mark)	
2024 – four-year-old season
30 Mar 2024	2410 metres (Note: Distance for the event was approximately 1 1/2 miles)	Dubai Sheema Classic	I	Meydan (UAE)	N/A (Note: Auguste Rodin final odds with British Bookmakers were 11/8 favourite since gambling is prohibited in the United Arab Emirates)	12	12	2:26.72	(21 3/4 lengths)	Ryan Moore	Rebel's Romance	
26 May 2024	1 mile 2 1/2 furlongs	Tattersalls Gold Cup	I	The Curragh	11/10*	8	2	2:11.61	(3 lengths)	Ryan Moore	White Birch	
19 Jun 2024	1m 1f 212y	Prince of Wales's Stakes	I	Royal Ascot	13/8*	10	1	2:03.12	3/4 length	Ryan Moore	(Zarakem)	
27 July 2024	1m 3f 211y	King George VI and Queen Elizabeth Stakes	I	Ascot	7/4*	9	5	2:27.43	(11 1/2 lengths)	Ryan Moore	Goliath	
14 Sep 2024	1 1/4 miles	Irish Champion Stakes	I	Leopardstown	9/4	8	2	2:03.20	(neck)	Ryan Moore	Economics	
24 Nov 2024	1 1/2 miles	Japan Cup	I	Tokyo	44/5	14	8	2:25.50	(4 1/4 lengths)	Ryan Moore	Do Deuce	

Notes:
An (*) asterisk after the odds means Auguste Rodin was the post-time favourite.

== Stud career ==
Auguste Rodin was retired to stud with Coolmore in Ireland. He also shuttled to Windsor Park Stud in Cambridge, New Zealand.

== Pedigree ==
Pedigree of Auguste Rodin (IRE), bay colt 2020
Sire Deep Impact (JPN) 2002	Sunday Silence (USA); 1986	Halo	Hail to Reason
Sire Deep Impact (JPN) 2002	Sunday Silence (USA); 1986	Halo	Cosmah
Sire Deep Impact (JPN) 2002	Sunday Silence (USA); 1986	Wishing Well	Understanding
Sire Deep Impact (JPN) 2002	Sunday Silence (USA); 1986	Wishing Well	Mountain Flower
Sire Deep Impact (JPN) 2002	Wind in Her Hair (IRE); 1991	Alzao (USA)	Lyphard
Sire Deep Impact (JPN) 2002	Wind in Her Hair (IRE); 1991	Alzao (USA)	Lady Rebecca (GB)
Sire Deep Impact (JPN) 2002	Wind in Her Hair (IRE); 1991	Burghclere (GB)	Busted
Sire Deep Impact (JPN) 2002	Wind in Her Hair (IRE); 1991	Burghclere (GB)	Highclere
Dam Rhododendron (IRE) 2009	Galileo (IRE); 1998	Sadler's Wells (USA)	Northern Dancer (CAN)
Dam Rhododendron (IRE) 2009	Galileo (IRE); 1998	Sadler's Wells (USA)	Fairy Bridge
Dam Rhododendron (IRE) 2009	Galileo (IRE); 1998	Urban Sea (USA)	Miswaki
Dam Rhododendron (IRE) 2009	Galileo (IRE); 1998	Urban Sea (USA)	Allegretta (GB)
Dam Rhododendron (IRE) 2009	Halfway to Heaven (IRE); 2005	Pivotal (GB)	Polar Falcon (USA)
Dam Rhododendron (IRE) 2009	Halfway to Heaven (IRE); 2005	Pivotal (GB)	Fearless Revival
Dam Rhododendron (IRE) 2009	Halfway to Heaven (IRE); 2005	Cassandra Go	Indian Ridge
Dam Rhododendron (IRE) 2009	Halfway to Heaven (IRE); 2005	Cassandra Go	Rahaam (USA) (Family: 3-d)
