= Rathbride Stakes =

Annual flat horse race in Ireland

- Class: Group 3
- Location: Curragh Racecourse; Co. Kildare, Ireland
- Inaugurated: 2004
- Race type: Flat / Thoroughbred
- Website: Curragh

Race information
- Distance: 1m 1f (1,811 metres)
- Surface: Turf
- Track: Right-handed
- Qualification: Three-years-old and up fillies and mares excluding G1 winners
- Weight: 9 st 0 lb (3yo); 9 st 9 lb (4yo+); Penalties; 3 lb for Group 2 winners * * since 1 November last year
- Purse: €112,800 (2022); 1st: €70.800

Kilboy Estate Stakes
2026
Moody	Rhapsody	Nyra

Previous years
2025
One Look	Azada	Tasmania
2024
Royal Dress	American Sonja	Caernarfon
2023
Jackie Oh	Village Voice	Goldana
2022
Lily Pond	Seisai	One For Bobby
2021
Insinuendo	April Showers	Lovely Esteem

2020-2011
2020
Lemista	Lovelier	Kiss For A Jewel
2019
Red Tea	Goddess	Annie Fior
2018
Magical	I'm So Fancy	Broadway
2017
Elizabeth Browning	Wilamina	Laganore
2016
Bocca Baciata	Earring	Hawksmoor
2015
Wedding Vow	Brooch	Bocca Baciata
2014
Mango Diva	Lahinch Classics	My Titania
2013
Dank	Say	Caponata
2012
Tannery	Caponata	Up
2011
Manieree	Kirinda	Claiomh Solais

2010–2004
2010
Latin Love	Emulous	She's Our Mark
2009
She's Our Mark	Latin Love	Timabiyra
2008
Navajo Moon	Jalmira	Indiana Gal
2007
Alexander Tango	She's Our Mark	Cherry Hinton
2006
Blessyourpinksox	Fermion	Hovering
2005
Adaala	Jazz Princess	Queen Titi
2004
Tropical Lady	Noahs Ark	Kisses For Me

The Rathbride Stakes is a Group 3 flat horse race in Ireland open to thoroughbred fillies and mares aged three years or older. It is run over a distance of 1 mile and 1 furlong (1,811 metres) at the Curragh in July.

== History ==
Until 2022 the race was sponsored by Kilboy Estate, a stud farm located in Dolla. It was established in 2004, and the first running was won by Tropical Lady.

The Kilboy Estate Stakes initially held Listed status. It was promoted to Group 3 level in 2011, and raised to Group 2 in 2013. In 2023 the race was downgraded to Group 3 status and given its current title.

The race is staged during a two-day meeting called Irish Oaks Weekend. It is currently run on the second day, the day after the Irish Oaks.

== Records ==
Most successful horse:

- no horse has won this race more than once

Leading jockey (5 wins):

- Ryan Moore - Latin Love (2010), Dank (2013), Mango Diva (2014), Magical (2018), Lily Pond (2022)

Leading trainer (5 wins):

- Aidan O'Brien - Wedding Vow (2015), Elizabeth Browning (2017), Magical (2018), Lily Pond (2022), Jackie Oh (2023)

== Winners ==
Year	Winner	Age	Jockey	Trainer	Time
2004	Tropical Lady	4	Kevin Manning	Jim Bolger	1:50.40
2005	Adaala	3	Declan McDonogh	Kevin Prendergast	1:50.40
2006	Blessyourpinksox	5	Fran Berry	Peter Casey	1:52.00
2007	Alexander Tango	3	Wayne Lordan	Tommy Stack	2:03.50
2008	Navajo Moon	4	Wayne Lordan	David Wachman	1:53.75
2009	She's Our Mark	5	Danny Grant	Pat Flynn	2:00.06
2010	Latin Love	4	Ryan Moore	David Wachman	1:53.40
2011	Manieree	3	Niall McCullagh	John Oxx	2:01.53
2012	Tannery	3	Wayne Lordan	David Wachman	2:01.18
2013	Dank	4	Ryan Moore	Michael Stoute	1:51.29
2014	Mango Diva	4	Ryan Moore	Michael Stoute	1:55.62
2015	Wedding Vow	3	Joseph O'Brien	Aidan O'Brien	1:54.14
2016	Bocca Baciata	4	Colm O'Donoghue	Jessica Harrington	1:54.38
2017	Elizabeth Browning	3	Seamie Heffernan	Aidan O'Brien	1:49.29
2018	Magical	3	Ryan Moore	Aidan O'Brien	1:54.16
2019	Red Tea	6	Donnacha O'Brien	Joseph Patrick O'Brien	1:55.31
2020	Lemista	3	Colin Keane	Ger Lyons	1:58.76
2021	Insinuendo	4	Billy Lee	Willie McCreery	1:55.98
2022	Lily Pond	3	Ryan Moore	Aidan O'Brien	1:54.39
2023	Jackie Oh (Note: The 2023 running took place at Gowran Park)	3	Colin Keane	Aidan O'Brien	1:58.16
2024	Royal Dress	4	Ben Coen	James Tate	1:50.34
2025	One Look	4	Wayne Lordan	Paddy Twomey	2:08.03
2026	Moody	4	Billy Lee	Paddy Twomey	2:04.53

== See also ==
- Horse racing in Ireland
- List of Irish flat horse races
