= Karen Wiltshire =

English jockey (born 1956)

Personal information
- Nationality: English
- Born: 22 February 1956 (age 70)
- Occupation: Jockey

Horse racing career
- Sport: Horse racing
- Career wins: 1

Significant horses
- Friday 13th, The Goldstone, Somers Heir

Karen Wiltshire (born 22 February 1956) is an English former jockey. In 1978 she became the first female professional jockey to win a British Flat race.

== Early life ==
Wiltshire was educated at a private convent school. As a child, she competed in showjumping and cross-country riding, while also taking lessons in judo.

== Career ==
Wiltshire's racing career began when she was hired as an apprentice to trainer Bill Wightman. In 1978, of her apprenticeship, she said "I had my chance with the Equal Opportunities law two years ago. I applied to join Mr Bill Wightman and he gave me a trial."

In 1977, she made her racing debut at Newbury, riding on Friday 13th, trained by Wightman. The following year, she was chosen to ride The Goldstone, a horse owned by Lady Pakenham, at Bath, missing out on second place in a photo finish.

On 14 September 1978, aged 22, Wiltshire and The Goldstone won the Winterbourne Handicap at Salisbury, making her the first winning professional female jockey in Britain. It remained the only win of her professional career, and despite her historic success Wiltshire was forbidden from speaking to the press under the terms of her apprenticeship agreement.

In 1979, Wiltshire, on Somers Heir, finished second to Walter Swinburn in a televised race at Epsom after a photo finish, becoming the first female jockey to ride at the racecourse.

Even after her win she "couldn't get the rides" in England, so she moved to Bay Meadows Racetrack, California, in late 1979. Of her time there she said, "I had a couple of races there, but it was in the 70s and was all very hippyish and I just didn't like it, so came back." She subsequently retired, with a record of 18 rides, including one win, one second-place and three third-place finishes.

=== Sexism ===
Wiltshire has spoken about the many examples of casual sexism she experienced in her career, including being regularly overlooked for rides, and being forced to share a changing room with male jockeys due to a lack of female facilities. At Bill Wightman's insistence, she cut her hair short, wore no make-up, and was entered into races as "K. Wiltshire".

In 2024, she told BBC Sport that as well as verbal abuse and ridicule, she had once been physically sexually assaulted in the changing rooms at Warwick by a fellow jockey, and on a separate occasion hit on the bottom with a riding crop mid-race.

== Post-retirement ==
After retiring, Wiltshire began working in her father's property development business. She was offered a position as first jockey at Karl Zivna's racing club in Vienna, but chose to continue with her business career instead. As of 2024, she works as a fitness instructor at her own gym in Hampshire, England.

== Personal life ==
Wiltshire is the daughter of a Hampshire farmer. She has one daughter, Lara, a yacht racer. In 2024, she published her autobiography, No Place For A Girl, written with Nick Townsend.
