= Halfway to Heaven (horse) =

Irish-bred Thoroughbred racehorse

- Racing colours of Michael Tabor
- Sire: Pivotal
- Grandsire: Polar Falcon
- Dam: Cassandra Go
- Damsire: Indian Ridge
- Sex: Mare
- Foaled: 25 April 2005
- Country: Ireland
- Colour: Grey
- Breeder: Trevor Stewart
- Owner: Michael Tabor, Susan Magnier and Derrick Smith
- Trainer: Aidan O'Brien
- Record: 9:4-2-2
- Earnings: £470,905

Major wins
- Irish 1,000 Guineas (2008); Nassau Stakes (2008); Sun Chariot Stakes (2008)

Halfway to Heaven (foaled 25 April 2005) is a retired Irish-bred Thoroughbred racehorse and an active broodmare. After winning one minor race as a two-year-old in 2007, she emerged as one of the leading fillies in Europe the following year, recording Group One successes in the Irish 1,000 Guineas, Nassau Stakes and Sun Chariot Stakes. She was retired from racing at the end of the year having won four of her nine races and became a successful broodmare, producing two Group One-winning daughters.

== Background ==
Halfway to Heaven is a grey mare with a small white star bred by Trevor Stewart at the Ballyhimkin Stud in County Tipperary. During her racing career she was an extremely dark-coated grey, appearing to be almost black. Her sire Pivotal was a top class sprinter who won the King's Stand Stakes and the Nunthorpe Stakes in 1996. He went on to become an "excellent" sire, getting the winners of more than a thousand races across a range of distances including Sariska, Somnus, Peeress, Kyllachy (Nunthorpe Stakes) and Excellent Art (St James's Palace Stakes). Halfway to Heaven's dam, Cassandra Go was a top class sprinter, whose wins included the King George Stakes, Temple Stakes and King's Stand Stakes and was a descendant of the Kentucky Oaks winner Native Street.

As a yearling, Halfway to Heaven was sent by the Ballyhimkin Stud to the Goff's sales in September 2006 where she was bought for €450,000 by the bloodstock agent Dermot "Demi" O'Byrne on behalf of John Magnier's Coolmore organisation. Like many Coolmore horses, the details of Halfway to Heaven's ownership varied from race to race: she was sometimes listed as being owned by Michael Tabor, while in other races she was listed as the property of a partnership of Tabor, Susan Magnier and Derrick Smith. The filly was trained throughout her racing career by Aidan O'Brien at Ballydoyle.

== Racing career ==
=== 2007: two-year-old season ===
Halfway to Heaven did not appear on the racecourse until the late autumn of 2007. On 29 October she started the 4/1 favourite for a maiden race over seven furlongs at Leopardstown Racecourse and finished second of the eighteen runners behind Labaqa. A week later she started 9/10 favourite for a similar event over the same course and distance and won by a head from Charlotte Bronte.

=== 2008: three-year-old season ===
On her first appearance as a three-year-old, Halfway to Heaven contested the Leopardstown 1,000 Guineas Trial Stakes over seven furlongs on 6 April. Ridden as in both her previous races by Seamie Heffernan, the filly took the lead in the final quarter mile but was overtaken in the closing stages and finished second, beaten a head by the Dermot Weld-trained Caribbean Sunset. On 11 May, Halfway to Heaven was sent to France and moved up in class to contest the Group One Poule d'Essai des Pouliches over 1600 metres at Longchamp Racecourse. In an exceptionally strong renewal of the race, she started at odds of 24/1 and finished third behind Zarkava and Goldikova after leading briefly in the straight. Two weeks later, Halfway to Heaven returned to Ireland for the Irish 1,000 Guineas over one mile at the Curragh for which she started at odds of 13/2. Heffernan tracked the leaders before taking the lead two and a half furlong from the finish. In a four-way photo finish Halfway to Heaven prevailed from Tuscan Evening, Mad About You and Caribbean Sunset. After the race O'Brien commented; "She is a hardy lady and has come on for every run and I am delighted with her. Seamus gave her a great ride, her form was there and she is a very consistent filly. We knew they would go a solid pace and the race was fair for everyone. We will have a look at the Coronation now as she gets the mile well."

Halfway to Heaven bypassed the Coronation Stakes and was moved up in distance when she was sent to England to contest the Nassau Stakes over ten furlongs at Goodwood Racecourse on 2 August. In this race her opponents included the Coronation Stakes winner Lush Lashes as well the British fillies Passage of Time (Critérium de Saint-Cloud) and Majestic Roi (Sun Chariot Stakes). Ridden by Johnny Murtagh, Halfway to Heaven took a narrow lead approaching the final furlong and won by a head from Lush Lashes with Passage of Time a head away in third. Murtagh described the winner as "very brave and very tough. She's come on from the Guineas, she's thickened up well and she's moving well. She wins like this a lot, she is lazy." At Leopardstown a month later, Halfway to Heaven started 4/1 second favourite for the Matron Stakes in which she finished third, beaten a neck and half a length by Lush Lashes and the British-trained filly Nahoodh.

On 4 October Halfway to Heaven started at odds of 8/1 for the Group One Sun Chariot Stakes over one mile at Newmarket Racecourse. Heffernan sent the filly into the lead from the start and she ran on "gamely" in the closing stages to win by half a length from the French-trained favourite Darjina. O'Brien paid tribute to the filly's durability and consistency, saying "she has had a long old season, so to do this is really a credit to her". On her final appearance, Halfway to Heaven was sent to the United States to contest the Breeders' Cup Filly and Mare Turf at Santa Anita Park. She was made 5/2 favourite, but after taking second early in the straight, she dropped back to finish seventh of the ten runners behind Forever Together.

== Assessment ==
In the 2008 edition of the World Thoroughbred Rankings, Halfway to Heaven was given a rating of 118, making her the eightieth-best racehorse in the world and the sixth-best three-year-old filly.

== Breeding record ==
Halfway to Heaven was retired from racing to become a broodmare for the Coolmore Stud. Her foals include

- Flying The Flag, a chestnut colt, foaled in 2010, sired by Galileo, won three races including International Stakes
- Just Gorgeous, bay filly, 2011, by Galileo. Won one race.
- Hanover Street, chestnut colt (later gelded), 2012, by Galileo. Won one race.
- Rhododendron, bay filly, 2014, by Galileo. Won five races including Debutante Stakes, Fillies' Mile, Prix de l'Opéra, Lockinge Stakes. Dam of dual Derby winner Auguste Rodin.
- Magical, bay filly, 2015, by Galileo. Won twelve races including British Champions Fillies & Mares Stakes, Irish Champion Stakes (twice), Champion Stakes, Pretty Polly Stakes, Tattersalls Gold Cup.
- Heaven of Heavens, bay filly, 2017, by Galileo.

== Pedigree ==
Pedigree of Halfway to Heaven (IRE), grey mare, 2005
Sire Pivotal (GB) 1993	Polar Falcon (USA); 1987	Nureyev	Northern Dancer
Sire Pivotal (GB) 1993	Polar Falcon (USA); 1987	Nureyev	Special
Sire Pivotal (GB) 1993	Polar Falcon (USA); 1987	Marie d'Argonne	Jefferson
Sire Pivotal (GB) 1993	Polar Falcon (USA); 1987	Marie d'Argonne	Mohair
Sire Pivotal (GB) 1993	Fearless Revival (GB); 1987	Cozzene	Caro
Sire Pivotal (GB) 1993	Fearless Revival (GB); 1987	Cozzene	Ride The Trails
Sire Pivotal (GB) 1993	Fearless Revival (GB); 1987	Stufida	Bustino
Sire Pivotal (GB) 1993	Fearless Revival (GB); 1987	Stufida	Zerbinetta
Dam Cassandra Go (IRE) 1996	Indian Ridge (IRE); 1985	Ahonoora	Lorenzaccio
Dam Cassandra Go (IRE) 1996	Indian Ridge (IRE); 1985	Ahonoora	Helen Nichols
Dam Cassandra Go (IRE) 1996	Indian Ridge (IRE); 1985	Hillbrow	Swing Easy
Dam Cassandra Go (IRE) 1996	Indian Ridge (IRE); 1985	Hillbrow	Golden City
Dam Cassandra Go (IRE) 1996	Rahaam (USA); 1987	Secreto	Northern Dancer
Dam Cassandra Go (IRE) 1996	Rahaam (USA); 1987	Secreto	Betty's Secret
Dam Cassandra Go (IRE) 1996	Rahaam (USA); 1987	Fager's Glory	Mr. Prospector
Dam Cassandra Go (IRE) 1996	Rahaam (USA); 1987	Fager's Glory	Streets Glory (Family: 3-d)

- Halfway to Heaven is inbred 4 x 4 to Northern Dancer, meaning that this stallion appears twice in the fourth generation of her pedigree.
