= Magical (horse) =

Irish-bred Thoroughbred racehorse

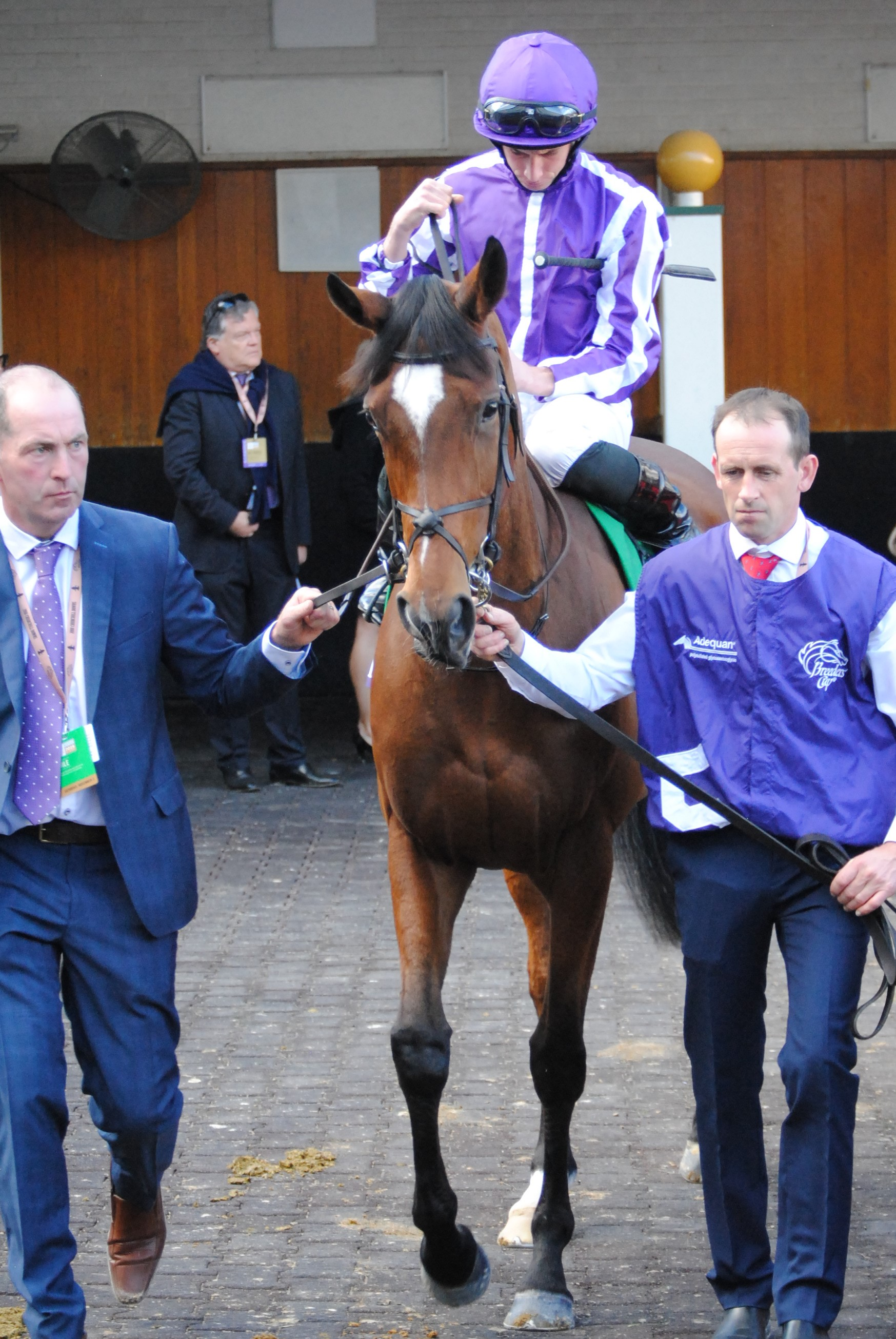
- Magical at the 2018 Breeders' Cup
- Sire: Galileo
- Grandsire: Sadler's Wells
- Dam: Halfway to Heaven
- Damsire: Pivotal
- Sex: Mare
- Foaled: 18 May 2015
- Country: Ireland
- Colour: Bay
- Breeder: Orpendale, Chelston & Wynatt
- Owner: Susan Magnier, Michael Tabor & Derrick Smith
- Trainer: Aidan O'Brien
- Record: 28: 12-8-2
- Earnings: £4,875,498

Major wins
- Debutante Stakes (2017); Kilboy Estate Stakes (2018); British Champions Fillies & Mares Stakes (2018); Alleged Stakes (2019); Mooresbridge Stakes (2019); Tattersalls Gold Cup (2019, 2020); Irish Champion Stakes (2019, 2020); Champion Stakes (2019); Pretty Polly Stakes (2020)

Magical (foaled 18 May 2015) is an Irish Thoroughbred racehorse who excelled over middle distances and was rated in the top twenty racehorses in the world in 2018 and 2019. She showed considerable ability as a juvenile in 2017, winning the Debutante Stakes and finishing second in the Moyglare Stud Stakes as well as running fourth in both the Prix Marcel Boussac and the Fillies' Mile. In the following year she won the Kilboy Estate Stakes but did not produce her best form until autumn when she took the British Champions Fillies and Mares Stakes and was narrowly beaten in the Breeders' Cup Turf. In 2019 she won the Alleged Stakes, Mooresbridge Stakes, Tattersalls Gold Cup, Irish Champion Stakes and Champion Stakes as well as finishing second in the Prince of Wales's Stakes, Eclipse Stakes and Yorkshire Oaks. As a five-year-old she was as good as ever, winning the Pretty Polly Stakes and recording repeat victories in the Tattersalls Gold Cup and the Irish Champion Stakes as well as being placed in the International Stakes, Champion Stakes, Breeders' Cup Turf and Hong Kong Cup.

== Background ==
Magical is a bay filly with a large white star and a white sock on her right hind leg bred in Ireland by Orpendale, Chelston & Wynatt, breeding companies associated with the Coolmore Stud organisation. The filly was sent into training with Aidan O'Brien at Ballydoyle. Like many Coolmore horses, the official details of her ownership have changed from race to race: she has sometimes been listed as being the property of Derrick Smith, while on other occasions she has been described as being owned by a partnership of Smith, Michael Tabor and Susan Magnier.

She was sired by Galileo, who won the Derby, Irish Derby and King George VI and Queen Elizabeth Stakes in 2001. Galileo is now one of the world's leading stallions and has been champion sire of Great Britain and Ireland five times. His other progeny include Frankel, Nathaniel, New Approach, Rip Van Winkle, Found Minding and Ruler of the World. Magical's dam Halfway to Heaven was one of the best European fillies of her generation, winning the Irish 1,000 Guineas, Nassau Stakes and Sun Chariot Stakes in 2008. As a broodmare she has produced other winners including Rhododendron. Halfway to Heaven's dam, Cassandra Go was a top class sprinter, whose wins included the King George Stakes, Temple Stakes and King's Stand Stakes and was a descendant of the Kentucky Oaks winner Native Street.

== Racing career ==
=== 2017: two-year-old season ===
Magical began her racing career by finishing second to the Jim Bolger-trained Dawn Delivers in a maiden race over six furlongs at the Curragh on 16 July. On 8 August at Cork Racecourse she started 2/5 favourite for a one-mile maiden in which she was ridden by her trainer's son Donnacha O'Brien. She recorded her first success as she took the lead inside the final furlong and won by a head from the 25/1 outsider Mary Tudor. Twelve days later the filly was stepped up in class for the Group 2 Debutante Stakes over seven furlongs at the Curragh and started the 11/1 third choice in the betting behind her stablemates September (winner of the Chesham Stakes) and Happily in an eight-runner field which also included Dawn Delivers and Mary Tudor. Ridden by Donnacha O'Brien she led from the start and kept on well to win "comfortably" by one and a quarter lengths from Happily. After the race Aidan O'Brien said "She had a lovely run the first day and she was a bit green at Cork and made hard work of it. Donnacha was delighted with her... [he] gave her a lovely ride and had her in a good position throughout the race. She stays well and should get well beyond a mile next year".

On 10 September at the Curragh Magical was moved up Group 1 Moyglare Stud Stakes in which she was partnered by Ryan Moore and started second favourite behind Alpha Centauri. She led for most of the way but was caught on the line and beaten a short head by Happily, with the pair finishing almost four lengths clear of September in third. Three weeks later she was sent to France for the Prix Marcel Boussac over 1600 metres in which she produced a strong late run but finished fourth behind Wild Illusion, Polydream and Mission Impassible. Twelve days after her run in France, the filly started 15/8 favourite for the Fillies' Mile at Newmarket Racecourse but tired in the final furlong and came home fourth behind Laurens.

=== 2018: three-year-old season ===
On her three-year-old debut Magical was equipped with blinkers when she contested the Group 3 Prix de la Grotte on heavy ground at Longchamp on 15 April and came home fourth of the eight runners behind Musis Amica after racing in second for most of the way. Plans to run her in the Epsom Oaks on 1 June were abandoned two days before the race when she failed to recover from a minor leg injury. The filly had been off the course for over three months when she returned for the Group 2 Kilboy Estate Stakes over nine furlongs at the Curragh on 22 July in which he started the 5/4 favourite. Ridden by Moore, she led from the start and drew away in the last quarter mile to win "comfortably" by two and three quarter lengths from I'm So Fancy. Aidan O'Brien commented "This was a nice start back for her and hopefully she's OK. She's a lovely filly, how far she'll stay, I'm not sure. We'll see how she is... The whole rest of the season is in front of her."

After another lengthy break, Magical reappeared for the Group 1 Matron Stakes over one mile at Leopardstown Racecourse on 15 September. She raced in second place for most of the way but lost her position when she was hampered in the straight and came home fourth behind Laurens, Alpha Centauri and Clemmie. The filly was then stepped up in distance and matched against the strongest weight-for-age competition when she contested the Prix de l'Arc de Triomphe over 2400 metres at Longchamp on 7 October. Starting a 40/1 outsider she made steady progress in the straight without ever looking likely to win and finished tenth, five and a quarter lengths behind the winner Enable. Thirteen days after her run in the Arc, the filly was back on the track for the Group 1 British Champions Fillies & Mares Stakes over one and a half miles at Ascot Racecourse. With Moore in the saddle she started the 5/1 second favourite behind Lah Ti Dar (runner-up in the St Leger) in an eleven-runner field which also included Hydrangea, Kitesurf (Prix Vermeille) and Coronet (Ribblesdale Stakes). After racing in fifth place, Magical moved up to take the lead approaching the final furlong and kept on well to win by a length from Coronet with Lah Ti Dar three quarters of a length back in third. O'Brien said "She was working lovely – and we're really, really delighted. We were always going to take our time with her, and she had a lovely position and relaxed. So I couldn't have been happier... She is very valuable."

On her final run of the season, Magical was sent to the United States for the Breeders' Cup Turf at Churchill Downs on 3 November in which she was ridden by Moore. She raced in mid-division before moving up to dispute the lead on the final turn. The closing stages saw a sustained struggle between Magical and the favourite Enable with the two fillies drawing right away from the field before Enable prevailed by three quarters of a length. There was a gap of nine lengths back to Sadler's Joy in third place.

In the 2018 World's Best Racehorse Rankings Magical was given a rating of 122, making her the 20th best racehorse in the world and the third best three-year-old filly behind Almond Eye and Alpha Centauri.

=== 2019: four-year-old season ===
==== Spring ====
Magical began her third campaign in the Group 3 Alleged Stakes over 10 furlongs at Naas Racecourse on 13 April and started favourite ahead of seven opponents including the Irish Derby winner Latrobe and the Irish St. Leger winner Flag of Honour (also trained by O'Brien). The filly was settled in fourth place by Moore before going to the front a furlong out and drawing away to win by four and a half lengths from Flag of Honour. On 6 May Magical faced Flag of Honour and Latrobe again in the Group 2 Mooresbridge Stakes at the Curragh. Starting at odds of 2.9/1, she took the lead approaching the final furlong and won "comfortably" from Flag of Honour, beating her stablemate by a length and a half.

Twenty days later the filly returned to Group 1 company and started 2/7 favourite for the Tattersalls Gold Cup against four opponents, namely Flag of Honour, Verbal Dexterity (National Stakes), Mustajeer (Finale Stakes) and Zihba (Amethyst Stakes). After racing in second place she went to the front in the last quarter mile and won "easily" by seven lengths, with Flag of Honour taking second place yet again. After the race O'Brien commented: "We are delighted to have her as a four-year-old. She's a big, powerful mare that is full of quality, with great strength and a super mind. She had done enough last year to go off to stud, so it's a great credit to all the lads to keep her in training".

==== Summer ====
On 19 June Magical started favourite ahead of Crystal Ocean for the Prince of Wales's Stakes at Royal Ascot in an eight-runner field. The race was run in challenging conditions in heavy rain on soft ground. After racing in third place for most of the way the filly stayed on strongly in the straight but was unable to peg back Crystal Ocean and was beaten one and a quarter lengths into second place. The Eclipse Stakes over ten furlongs at Sandown Park on 6 July saw Magical face a rematch with her Breeders' Cup conqueror Enable. She raced in third place before keeping on well but was unable to overhaul the British mare and finished second by three quarters of a length. The filly faced Enable yet again in the Yorkshire Oaks in August and was again bested by the British mare, beaten two and three quarter lengths into second place.

==== Autumn ====
In the Irish Champion Stakes at Leopardstown on 14 September Magical started the 11/10 favourite against seven opponents including Anthony Van Dyck, Deirdre and Madhmoon (runner-up in the Epsom Derby). After tracking the pacemaker Hunting Horn, Magical took the lead two furlongs out, opened up a clear advantage and won by two and a quarter lengths from her stablemate Magic Wand. O'Brien commented "We're delighted. She had a midsummer break and had her first run back in York. We knew there when she ran Enable to a couple of lengths, knowing that she was going to come forward for it, that she was going to be in good shape for today."

At Longchamp on 6 October Magical went off at odds of 19/1 in her second attempt to win the Prix de l'Arc de Triomphe in which she was ridden by Donnacha O'Brien. She took the lead 500 metres from the finish but tired in the closing stages and came home fifth behind Waldgeist, Enable, Sottsass and Japan. In the Champion Stakes over ten furlongs at Newmarket thirteen days later Magical was partnered by Donnacha O'Brien and went off favourite in a nine-runner field which also included Coronet, Addeybb and Deirdre. She raced in second place behind Regal Reality before taking the lead approaching the final furlong and held off the sustained challenge of Addeybb to win by three quarters of a length. After the race Aidan O'Brien called her the "ultimate racehorse" adding "She's totally sound, mentally and physically... She handles ease in the ground, she goes on fast ground... She accepts everything on the chin and says what do you want me to do today? It's internally with her, it's her mind. She never says no".

Magical was expected to end her racing career with a run in the Breeders' Cup Filly and Mare Turf but the plan was abandoned when she was found to be running a high temperature shortly before her scheduled flight to the United States.

In the 2019 World's Best Racehorse Rankings Magical was given a rating of 122, making her the 19th best racehorse in the world and the second best four-year-old filly behind Almond Eye.

=== 2020: five-year-old season ===
==== Summer ====
The 2020 flat racing season in Europe was disrupted by the COVID-19 pandemic and Magical did not appear on the track until 28 June when she started the 2/5 favourite for the Group 1 Pretty Polly Stakes over ten furlongs at the Curragh with the best of her four opponents appearing to be Fleeting (May Hill Stakes) and Cayenne Pepper (Flame of Tara Stakes). Ridden by Seamie Heffernan she led from the start in a race run in heavy rain and a "howling wind" and steadily drew away from her rivals in the straight to win "easily" by four and a half lengths. After the race O'Brien explained that the mare had been intended to be retired to become a broodmare at the end of the previous season. He commented "She got stronger over the winter, and that's why the lads brought her back... Something just happened with her over the winter. She transformed. Usually you see that sort of improvement from 3 to 4, but she made it from 4 to 5. The power really came into her body."

The 2020 edition of the Tattersalls Gold Cup, originally scheduled for May, was run on 26 July at the Curragh and Magical, ridden by Wayne Lordan went off at odds of 2/9 in a six-runner field as she attempted to replicate her 2019 victory. She took the lead from the start, was never seriously challenged, and won "comfortably" coming home two and a quarter lengths clear of Sir Dragonet with Search For A Song a further two lengths back in third. O'Brien, who was quarantined at the time said "She is a great mare. The only reason she is here now is because of the progress she made over the winter, and she had progressed again from the Pretty Polly, so we are delighted the lads kept her in training." The mare entered the winner's enclosure to the sounds of Cyndi Lauper's Girls Just Want to Have Fun.

At York in August Magical was ridden by Moore in the International Stakes over ten and a half furlongs at York where she started second favourite and kept on well in the straight and finished second behind the front-running Ghaiyyath.

==== Autumn ====
Magical was partnered by Heffernan when she faced a rematch with Ghaiyyath on 12 September at Leopardstown as she attempted to repeat her win of the previous year in the Irish Champion Stakes. She started the 9/2 second favourite in a six-runner field which also included Sottsass, Japan, Armory (Royal Whip Stakes) and Leo de Fury (2020 Mooresbridge Stakes). She raced in second place behind Ghaiyyath before joining the leader in the straight and got the better of a sustained struggle with her main rival to win by three quarters of a length. O'Brien said "We were delighted Ghaiyyath was coming because we were going to get another go at him. We just felt York didn't work 100% for us and today she eyeballed him all the way, so we're delighted. We were very happy to make the running today and if Ghaiyyath wanted to take a lead we'd be happy and if he made the running we were going to go with him. It was always going to be a solid even match all the way and whoever was behind could have come along and come and got us, but we just took the chance that we'd let her and him match up, go stride for stride and see."

At Ascot on 17 October the mare ran for the second time in the Champion Stakes and started the 15/8 favourite in a ten-runner field. She was restrained by Moore in the early stages before staying on strongly in the straight but never looked likely to win and finished third behind Addeybb and the French challenger Skalleti. On 7 November at Keeneland Magical started favourite in her second attempt to win the Breeders' Cup Turf. She tracked the leaders and stayed on well in the closing stages and was beaten a length by Tarnawa after overhauling the front-running Channel Maker for second place in the final strides. On her final run of the year, Magical started favourite for the Hong Kong Cup at Sha Tin Racecourse in December and finished third in a closely contested finish, beaten three quarters of a length and a short head by the Japanese runners Normcore and Win Bright.

On 22 December, it was announced that Magical had been retired from racing. Aidan O'Brien said "She was unbelievably tough, versatile, consistent and classy. Her mother was always rated a queen and she was rated a queen herself when she was born... She was a dream mare to have, and most of the days she got beat, you could say that if things had happened differently she might not have. She never shirked anything."

In the 2020 World's Best Racehorse Rankings, Magical was rated on 122, making her the equal twenty-first best racehorse in the world.

== Pedigree ==
Pedigree of Magical (IRE), bay filly, 2015
Sire Galileo (IRE) 1998	Sadler's Wells (USA); 1981	Northern Dancer	Nearctic
Sire Galileo (IRE) 1998	Sadler's Wells (USA); 1981	Northern Dancer	Natalma
Sire Galileo (IRE) 1998	Sadler's Wells (USA); 1981	Fairy Bridge	Bold Reason
Sire Galileo (IRE) 1998	Sadler's Wells (USA); 1981	Fairy Bridge	Special
Sire Galileo (IRE) 1998	Urban Sea (USA) ch. 1989	Miswaki	Mr. Prospector
Sire Galileo (IRE) 1998	Urban Sea (USA) ch. 1989	Miswaki	Hopespringseternal
Sire Galileo (IRE) 1998	Urban Sea (USA) ch. 1989	Allegretta	Lombard
Sire Galileo (IRE) 1998	Urban Sea (USA) ch. 1989	Allegretta	Anatevka
Dam Halfway to Heaven (IRE) 2005	Pivotal (GB); 1993	Polar Falcon	Nureyev
Dam Halfway to Heaven (IRE) 2005	Pivotal (GB); 1993	Polar Falcon	Marie d'Argonne
Dam Halfway to Heaven (IRE) 2005	Pivotal (GB); 1993	Fearless Revival	Cozzene
Dam Halfway to Heaven (IRE) 2005	Pivotal (GB); 1993	Fearless Revival	Stufida
Dam Halfway to Heaven (IRE) 2005	Cassandra Go (IRE); 1996	Indian Ridge	Ahonoora
Dam Halfway to Heaven (IRE) 2005	Cassandra Go (IRE); 1996	Indian Ridge	Millbrow
Dam Halfway to Heaven (IRE) 2005	Cassandra Go (IRE); 1996	Rahaam	Secreto
Dam Halfway to Heaven (IRE) 2005	Cassandra Go (IRE); 1996	Rahaam	Fager's Glory (Family 3-d)
