= Beckford Stakes =

Flat horse race in Britain

- Class: Listed
- Location: Bath Racecourse; Somerset, England
- Inaugurated: 2016
- Race type: Flat / Thoroughbred
- Sponsor: British Stallion Studs
- Website: Bath

Race information
- Distance: 1m 6f (2,820 m)
- Surface: Turf
- Track: Left-handed
- Qualification: Three-years-old and up fillies & mares excluding G1 winners after 31 March
- Weight: 9 st 0 lb (57 kg) (3yo); 9 st 6 lb (60 kg) (4yo+); Penalties; 7 lb (3.2 kg) for Group 2 winners * 5 lb (2.3 kg) for Group 3 winners * 3 lb (1.4 kg) for Listed winners * * since 31 March
- Purse: £65,000 (2025); 1st: £36,862

Beckford Stakes
2026
Brilliant Star	Littlecote	Little Dorrit

Previous years
2025
Term Of Endearment	Fairy Glen	Siege Of Troy
2024
Entrancement	Marie's Rock	Forest Fairy
2023
One Evening	Vera Verto	Mimikyu
2022
Perfect Alibi	Pearl Beach	Goolwa
2021
Goolwa	Brunnera	Sacred Rhyme

2020-2016
2020
Traisha	Urban Artist	Hereby
2019
Sapa Inca	Hulcote	Dance Legend
2018
True Self	Mistress Quickly	Roystonia
2017
Aljezeera	Capricious Cantor	Pacharana
2016
Twitch	Vive Ma Fille	Anzhelika

The Beckford Stakes is a Listed flat horse race in Great Britain open to fillies and mares aged three years or older. It is run at Bath over a distance of 1 mile and 6 furlongs (2,820 m), and it is scheduled to take place each year in October.

The race was created as a new Listed race in 2016.

== Winners ==
Year	Winner	Age	Jockey	Trainer	Time
2016	Twitch	4	James Doyle	Hugo Palmer	3:02.66
2017 (Note: The 2017 and 2022 runnings were held at Yarmouth)	Aljezeera	3	Frankie Dettori	Luca Cumani	3:06.70
2018	True Self	5	Colin Keane	Willie Mullins	3:06.09
2019	Sapa Inca	3	Hayley Turner	Mark Johnston	3:09.59
2020	Traisha	4	David Egan	Joseph O'Brien	3:03.77
2021	Goolwa	3	David Probert	Andrew Balding	3:02.09
2022	Perfect Alibi	3	Tom Marquand	William Haggas	3:05.52
2023	One Evening	4	Kieran O'Neill	John & Thady Gosden	3:16.44
2024	Entrancement	4	Oisin Murphy	David Menuisier	3:11.11
2025	Term Of Edndearment	6	Tom Marquand	William Haggas	3:01.52
2026	Brilliant Star	3	Robert Havlin	John & Thady Gosden	3:01.97

== See also ==
- Horse racing in Great Britain
- List of British flat horse races
