= Lansdown Fillies' Stakes =

Flat horse race in Britain

Lansdown Fillies' Stakes
2026
Azure Angel	Cindy Lou Who	Beautiful Diamond

Previous years
2025
Electric Storm	Frost At Dawn	First Instinct
2024
Adaay In Devon	Electric Storm	Vadream
2023
Happy Romance	Perdika	Get Ahead
2022
White Lavender	Hellomydarlin	Get Ahead
2021
Declaring Love	Wise Words	Dickiedooda

2020-2011
2019
Queen Of Desire	Gold Filigree	Heartwarming
2018
Mrs Gallagher	Mabs Cross	Yolo Star
2017
Priceless	Futoon	Imtiyaaz
2015
Zuhoor Baynoona	Holley Shiftwell	Newsletter
2014
Ladies Are Forever	Reroute	Caledonia Lady
2013
Place In My Heart	My Propeller	Caledonia Lady
2012
Beyond Desire	Caledonia Lady	Sugar Beet

2010-2001
2010
Gilt Edge Girl	Golden Destiny	Anglezarke
2009
Look Busy	Crimson Fern	Siren's Gift
2008
Morinqua	Dark Missile	Sweet Afton
2007
Enticing	Folga	Empress Jain
2006
Indian Maiden	Dhekraa	Clear Impression
2005
Indian Maiden	Sumora	Kind
2004
Ringmoor Down	La Cucaracha	Speed Cop
2003
Croeso Croeso	Dragon Flyer	Olivia Grace
2002
Swiss Lake	Palace Affair	Mizillablack
2001
Red Millennium	Ivory's Joy	Total Love

2000-1999
2000
Cassandra Go	Seraphina	Carhue Lass
1999
Carhue Lass	Inya Lake	Ellway Star

The Lansdown Fillies' Stakes is a Listed flat horse race in Great Britain open to fillies aged three years and up.

It is run at Bath over a distance of 5 furlongs and 10 yards (1,015 metres ), and it is scheduled to take place each year in April.

The race was first run in 1999.

== Records ==
Most successful horse (2 wins):

- Indian Maiden – 2005, 2006

Leading jockey (2 wins):

- Ted Durcan – Indian Maiden (2005, 2006)
- Adam Kirby - Place In My Heart (2013), Priceless (2017)

Leading trainer (3 wins):

- Clive Cox – Gilt Edge Girl (2010), Place In My Heart (2013), Priceless (2017)

== Winners ==
Year	Winner	Age	Jockey	Trainer	Time
1999	Carhue Lass	5	Kieren Fallon	Patrick O'Leary	1:05.20
2000	Cassandra Go	4	Michael Roberts	Geoff Wragg	1:02.30
2001	Red Millennium	3	Franny Norton	Alan Berry	1:02.60
2002	Swiss Lake	3	Olivier Peslier	Gerard Butler	1:01.70
2003	Croeso Croeso	5	Seb Sanders	John Spearing	1:01.11
2004	Ringmoor Down	5	Dane O'Neill	David Arbuthnot	1:01.38
2005	Indian Maiden	5	Ted Durcan	Malcolm Saunders	1:07.22
2006	Indian Maiden	6	Ted Durcan	Malcolm Saunders	1:01.06
2007	Enticing	3	Jamie Spencer	William Haggas	0:58.75
2008	Morinqua	4	Tom Queally	James Given	1:04.00
2009	Look Busy	4	Slade O'Hara	Alan Berry	1:01.41
2010	Gilt Edge Girl	4	Luke Morris	Clive Cox	1:01.07
2011	No race (Note: Bath racecourse's application to run the race in June in 2011 was refused.)
2012	Beyond Desire	5	Neil Callan	Roger Varian	1:02.69
2013	Place In My Heart	4	Adam Kirby	Clive Cox	1:01.21
2014	Ladies Are Forever	6	Robert Tart	Geoff Oldroyd	0:59.88
2015	Zuhoor Baynoona	3	Patrick Mathers	Richard Fahey	0:59.74
2016	Demora	7	Andrew Mullen	Michael Appleby	1:06.25
2017	Priceless	4	Adam Kirby	Clive Cox	0:59.67
2018	Mrs Gallagher	3	Josephine Gordon	William Jarvis	1:01.24
2019	Queen Of Desire	4	Jack Mitchell	Roger Varian	1:00.40
	no race 2020 (Note: The 2020 running was cancelled because of the COVID-19 pandemic in the United Kingdom)
2021	Declaring Love	4	Pat Cosgrave	John Butler	0:59.68
2022	White Lavender	4	Clifford Lee	Karl Burke	1:01.49
2023	Happy Romance	5	Sean Levey	Richard Hannon Jr.	1:02.36
2024	Adaay In Devon	3	Silvestre de Sousa	Rod Millman	1:02.72
2025	Electric Storm	5	Daniel Tudhope	James Tate	0:58.30
2026	Azure Angel	6	Kieran Shoemark	Edward Bethell	1:01.89

== See also ==
- Horse racing in Great Britain
- List of British flat horse races
