= Irish Champion Stakes =

Flat horse race in Ireland

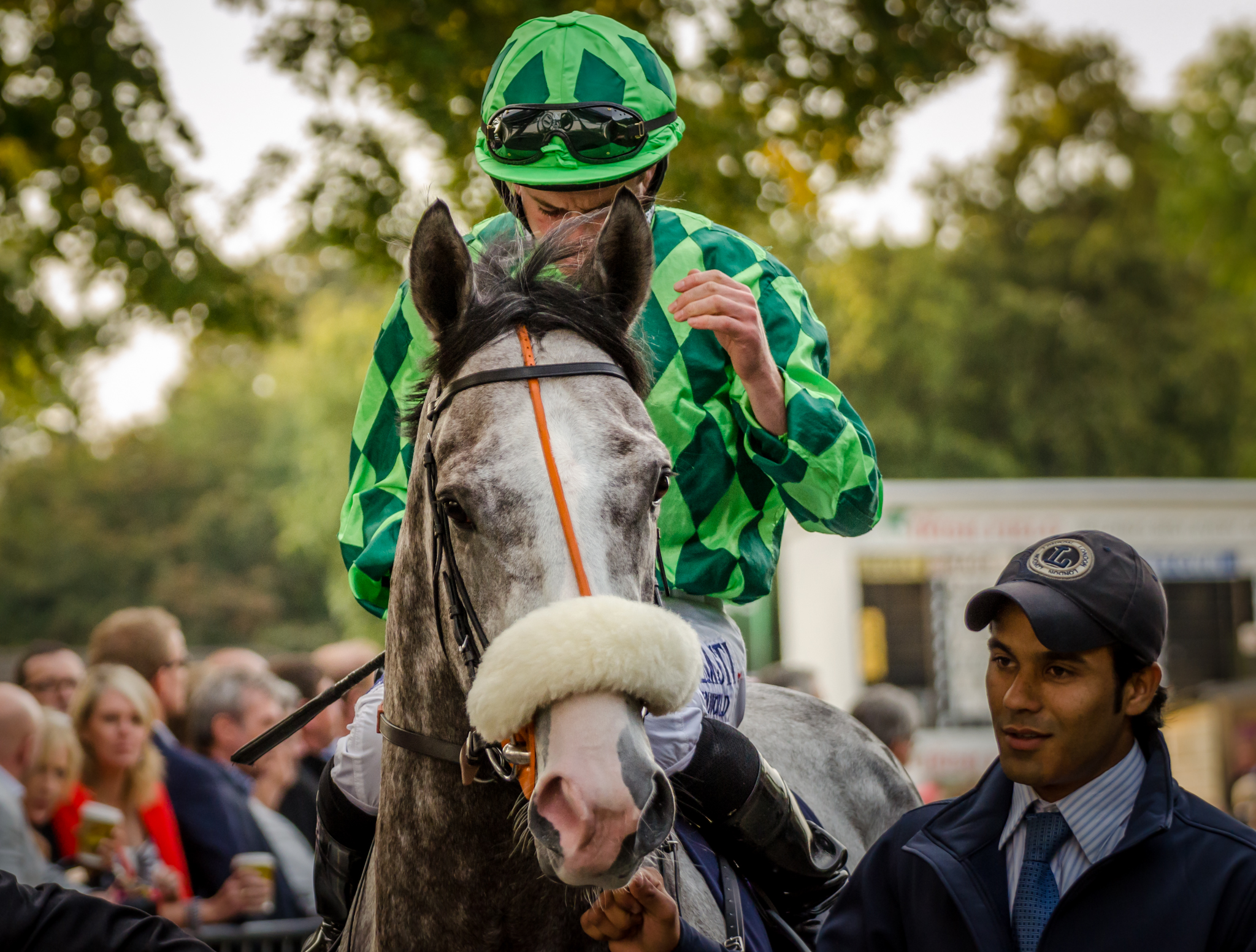
- The Grey Gatsby on the day of his victory in the race in 2014
- Class: Group 1
- Location: Leopardstown; County Dublin, Ireland
- Inaugurated: 1976
- Race type: Flat / Thoroughbred
- Sponsor: None (2020)
- Website: Irish Champions Weekend

Race information
- Distance: 1m 2f (2,012 metres)
- Surface: Turf
- Track: Left-handed
- Qualification: Three-years-old and up
- Weight: 9 st 1 lb (3yo); 9 st 7 lb (4yo+); Allowances; 3 lb for fillies and mares
- Purse: €1,000,000 (2022); 1st: €580,000

Irish Champion Stakes
2026
| Hotazhell | Wimbledon Hawkeye | Constitution River |

Previous years
2025
Delacroix | Anmaat | Royal Champion
2024
Economics | Auguste Rodin | Shin Emperor
2023
Auguste Rodin | Luxembourg | Nashwa
2022
Luxembourg | Onesto | Vadeni
2021
St Mark's Basilica | Tarnawa | Poetic Flare

2020-2011
2020
Magical | Ghaiyyath | Armory
2019
Magical | Magic Wand | Anthony Van Dyck
2018
Roaring Lion | Saxon Warrior | Deauville
2017
Decorated Knight | Poet's Word | Eminent
2016
Almanzor | Found | Minding
2015
Golden Horn | Found | Free Eagle
2014
The Grey Gatsby | Australia | Trading Leather
2013
The Fugue | Al Kazeem | Trading Leather
2012
Snow Fairy | Nathaniel | St Nicholas Abbey
2011
So You Think | Snow Fairy | Famous Name

2010-2001
2010
Cape Blanco | Rip Van Winkle | Twice Over
2009
Sea The Stars | Fame And Glory | Mastercraftsman
2008
New Approach | Traffic Guard | Mores Wells
2007
Dylan Thomas | Duke Of Marmalade | Red Rock Canyon
2006
Dylan Thomas | Ouija Board | Alexander Goldrun
2005
Oratorio | Motivator | Alexander Goldrun
2004
Azamour | Norse Dancer | Powerscourt
2003
High Chaparral | Falbrav | Islington
2002
Grandera | Hawk Wing | Best Of The Bests
2001
Fantastic Light | Galileo | Bach

2000-1991
2000
Giant's Causeway | Greek Dance | Best Of The Bests
1999
Daylami | Dazzling Park | Dream Well
1998
Swain | Alborada | Xaar
1997
Pilsudski | Desert King | Alhaarth
1996
Timarida | Dance Design | Glory Of Dancer
1995
Pentire | Freedom Cry | Flagbird
1994
Cezanne | Del Deya | Grand Lodge
1993
Muhtarram | Opera House | Lord Of The Field
1992
Dr Devious | St Jovite | Alflora
1991
Suave Dancer | Environment Friend | Stagecraft

1990-1983
1990
Elmaamul | Sikeston | Kostroma
1989
Carroll House | Citidancer | Petrullo
1988
Indian Skimmer | Shady Heights | Triptych
1987
Triptych | Entitled | Cockney Lass
1986
Park Express | Double Bed | Triptych
1985
Commanche Run | Bob Back | Damister
1984
Sadler's Wells | Seattle Song | Princess Pati
1983
Stanerra | Wassl | General Holme

The Irish Champion Stakes is a Group 1 flat horse race in Ireland open to horses aged three years or older. It is run at Leopardstown over a distance of 1 mile and 2 furlongs (2,012 metres), and it is scheduled to take place each year in September.

== History ==
The event was established in 1976, and it was initially held at Leopardstown as the Joe McGrath Memorial Stakes. It was named in memory of Joe McGrath (1887–1966), the founder of the Irish Hospitals' Sweepstake and a successful racehorse owner.

The race was transferred to Phoenix Park and renamed the Phoenix Champion Stakes in 1984. Its present title was introduced in 1991, when the event returned to Leopardstown after the closure of its former venue.

The Irish Champion Stakes became part of the Breeders' Cup Challenge series in 2009. The winner now earns an automatic invitation to compete in the same year's Breeders' Cup Turf.

The Irish Champion Stakes has become a very useful prep race for the remaining major races in the Autumn schedule such as the Prix de l'Arc de Triomphe, Champion Stakes, Breeders Cup, Hong Kong International Festival and major Group 1 races in Japan. The 2016 edition of the race was possibly one of its strongest editions with eight out of 12 participants winning 17 career Group 1's between them prior to the race. The form of the race would later see four of the participants win further Group 1 honours by the end of the 2016 season, producing a first & second in that year's Prix de l'Arc de Triomphe, first and second in the Champion Stakes, the winner of the Queen Elizabeth II Stakes, and first and second in the Breeders' Cup Turf.

Winners of the Irish Champion Stakes have gone on to win the Prix de l'Arc de Triomphe in the same season on five occasions: Carroll House (1989), Suave Dancer (1991), Dylan Thomas (2007), Sea The Stars (2009) and Golden Horn (2015), and a sixth Arc win was achieved when 2016 Irish Champion Stakes runner-up, Found, won the 2016 edition of the Prix de l'Arc de Triomphe.

Winners of the Irish Champion Stakes have gone on to win the Champion Stakes in the same season on six occasions: Triptych (1987), Indian Skimmer (1988), Pilsudski (1997), New Approach (2008), Almanzor (2016) and Magical (2019). The race has produced two further winners of the Champion Stakes with the 1986 third, Triptych, and the 2010 third, Twice Over, subsequently winning the British race that season.

Participants in the Irish Champion Stakes have gone on to win several Breeders' Cup titles in the same season. This includes five winners of the Breeders' Cup Turf, with Irish Champion Stakes winners such as Daylami (1999), Fantastic Light (2001), High Chaparral (2003) achieving a season double, while 2015 Irish Champion Stakes runner-up, Found, and a 2016 participant, Highland Reel, found success in the respective season's edition. In 2006, third placed Ouija Board went on to win that season's edition of the Breeders Cup' Filly & Mares Turf.

Success has been also achieved in Japan where the Irish Champion Stakes winners, Stanerra (1983) and Pilsudski (1997) won the Japan Cup in the same season. Meanwhile, 2011 runner-up, Snow Fairy, gained compensation by winning that year's Queen Elizabeth II Commemorative Cup

== Records ==
Most successful horse (2 wins):

- Dylan Thomas – 2006, 2007
- Magical - 2019, 2020

Leading jockey (7 wins):

- Michael Kinane – Carroll House (1989), Cezanne (1994), Pilsudski (1997), Giant's Causeway (2000), High Chaparral (2003), Azamour (2004), Sea the Stars (2009)

Leading trainer (13 wins):

- Aidan O'Brien – Giant's Causeway (2000), High Chaparral (2003), Oratorio (2005), Dylan Thomas (2006, 2007), Cape Blanco (2010), So You Think (2011), Magical (2019, 2020), St Mark's Basilica (2021), Luxembourg (2022), Auguste Rodin (2023), Delacroix (2025)

Leading owner (13 wins): (includes part ownership)

- Sue Magnier / Michael Tabor – Giant's Causeway (2000), High Chaparral (2003), Oratorio (2005), Dylan Thomas (2006, 2007), Cape Blanco (2010), So You Think (2011), Magical (2019, 2020), St Mark's Basilica,Luxembourg (2022), Auguste Rodin (2023), Delacroix (2025)

== Winners ==
| Year | Winner | Age | Jockey | Trainer | Owner | Time | Country |
|---|---|---|---|---|---|---|---|
| 1976 | Malacate | 3 | Lester Piggott | François Boutin | María Félix Berger | 2:07.60 | France |
| 1977 | North Stoke | 3 | Ron Hutchinson | John Dunlop | Mrs M. Lequime | 2:09.20 | United Kingdom |
| 1978 | Inkerman | 3 | Lester Piggott | Vincent O'Brien | Simon Fraser | 2:05.20 | Ireland |
| 1979 | Fordham | 4 | Tommy Carberry | Vincent O'Brien | Robert Sangster | 2:07.00 | Ireland |
| 1980 | Gregorian | 4 | George McGrath | Vincent O'Brien | Danny Schwartz | 2:07.80 | Ireland |
| 1981 | Kings Lake | 3 | Pat Eddery | Vincent O'Brien | Mrs Jean-Pierre Binet | 2:06.30 | Ireland |
| 1982 | Assert | 3 | Christy Roche | David O'Brien | Robert Sangster | 2:06.30 | Ireland |
| 1983 | Stanerra | 5 | Brian Rouse | Frank Dunne | Frank Dunne | 2:09.50 | Ireland |
| 1984 | Sadler's Wells | 3 | Pat Eddery | Vincent O'Brien | Robert Sangster | 2:00.90 | Ireland |
| 1985 | Commanche Run | 4 | Lester Piggott | Luca Cumani | Ivan Allan | 2:09.20 | United Kingdom |
| 1986 | Park Express | 3 | John Reid | Jim Bolger | Paddy Burns | 2:02.50 | Ireland |
| 1987 | Triptych | 5 | Tony Cruz | Patrick Biancone | Alan Clore | 2:06.70 | France |
| 1988 | Indian Skimmer | 4 | Michael Roberts | Henry Cecil | Sheikh Mohammed | 2:06.50 | United Kingdom |
| 1989 | Carroll House | 4 | Michael Kinane | Michael Jarvis | Antonio Balzarini | 2:04.00 | United Kingdom |
| 1990 | Elmaamul | 3 | Willie Carson | Dick Hern | Hamdan Al Maktoum | 2:02.90 | United Kingdom |
| 1991 | Suave Dancer | 3 | Cash Asmussen | John Hammond | Henri Chalhoub | 2:06.80 | France |
| 1992 | Dr Devious | 3 | John Reid | Peter Chapple-Hyam | Sidney Craig | 2:10.00 | United Kingdom |
| 1993 | Muhtarram | 4 | Willie Carson | John Gosden | Hamdan Al Maktoum | 2:06.10 | United Kingdom |
| 1994 | Cezanne | 5 | Michael Kinane | Sir Michael Stoute | Godolphin | 2:07.90 | United Kingdom |
| 1995 | Pentire | 3 | Michael Hills | Geoff Wragg | Mollers Racing | 2:04.40 | United Kingdom |
| 1996 | Timarida | 4 | Johnny Murtagh | John Oxx | Aga Khan IV | 2:06.20 | Ireland |
| 1997 | Pilsudski | 5 | Michael Kinane | Sir Michael Stoute | Lord Weinstock | 2:04.70 | United Kingdom |
| 1998 | Swain | 6 | Frankie Dettori | Saeed bin Suroor | Godolphin | 2:10.20 | United Kingdom |
| 1999 | Daylami | 5 | Frankie Dettori | Saeed bin Suroor | Godolphin | 2:08.40 | United Kingdom |
| 2000 | Giant's Causeway | 3 | Michael Kinane | Aidan O'Brien | Magnier / Tabor | 2:03.10 | Ireland |
| 2001 | Fantastic Light | 5 | Frankie Dettori | Saeed bin Suroor | Godolphin | 2:01.80 | United Kingdom |
| 2002 | Grandera | 4 | Frankie Dettori | Saeed bin Suroor | Godolphin | 2:04.70 | United Kingdom |
| 2003 | High Chaparral | 4 | Michael Kinane | Aidan O'Brien | Tabor / Magnier | 2:03.30 | Ireland |
| 2004 | Azamour | 3 | Michael Kinane | John Oxx | HH Aga Khan IV | 2:01.90 | Ireland |
| 2005 | Oratorio | 3 | Kieren Fallon | Aidan O'Brien | Magnier / Tabor | 2:03.90 | Ireland |
| 2006 | Dylan Thomas | 3 | Kieren Fallon | Aidan O'Brien | Magnier / Tabor | 2:02.90 | Ireland |
| 2007 | Dylan Thomas | 4 | Kieren Fallon | Aidan O'Brien | Magnier / Tabor | 2:02.27 | Ireland |
| 2008 | New Approach | 3 | Kevin Manning | Jim Bolger | Princess Haya of Jordan | 2:07.57 | Ireland |
| 2009 | Sea the Stars | 3 | Michael Kinane | John Oxx | Christopher Tsui | 2:03.90 | Ireland |
| 2010 | Cape Blanco | 3 | Seamie Heffernan | Aidan O'Brien | Smith / Magnier / Tabor | 2:03:89 | Ireland |
| 2011 | So You Think | 5 | Seamie Heffernan | Aidan O'Brien | Derrick Smith et al. | 2:04.20 | Ireland |
| 2012 | Snow Fairy | 5 | Frankie Dettori | Ed Dunlop | Anamoine Limited | 2:00.92 | United Kingdom |
| 2013 | The Fugue | 4 | William Buick | John Gosden | Andrew Lloyd Webber | 2:05.22 | United Kingdom |
| 2014 | The Grey Gatsby | 3 | Ryan Moore | Kevin Ryan | Frank Gillespie | 2:03.18 | United Kingdom |
| 2015 | Golden Horn | 3 | Frankie Dettori | John Gosden | Anthony Oppenheimer | 2:05.41 | United Kingdom |
| 2016 | Almanzor | 3 | Christophe Soumillon | Jean-Claude Rouget | Ecurie Antonio Caro | 2:08.93 | France |
| 2017 | Decorated Knight | 5 | Andrea Atzeni | Roger Charlton | Al Homaizi / Al Sagar | 2:08.36 | United Kingdom |
| 2018 | Roaring Lion | 3 | Oisin Murphy | John Gosden | Qatar Racing Ltd | 2:07.21 | United Kingdom |
| 2019 | Magical | 4 | Ryan Moore | Aidan O'Brien | Smith / Magnier / Tabor | 2:06.49 | Ireland |
| 2020 | Magical | 5 | Seamie Heffernan | Aidan O'Brien | Smith / Magnier / Tabor | 2:05.08 | Ireland |
| 2021 | St Mark's Basilica | 3 | Ryan Moore | Aidan O'Brien | Smith / Magnier / Tabor | 2:11.19 | Ireland |
| 2022 | Luxembourg | 3 | Ryan Moore | Aidan O'Brien | Westerberg / Smith / Magnier / Tabor | 2:12.10 | Ireland |
| 2023 | Auguste Rodin | 3 | Ryan Moore | Aidan O'Brien | Tabor / Smith / Magnier / Westerberg | 2:02.68 | Ireland |
| 2024 | Economics | 3 | Tom Marquand | William Haggas | Isa Salman Al Khalifa | 2:03.20 | United Kingdom |
| 2025 | Delacroix | 3 | Christophe Soumillon | Aidan O'Brien | Smith / Magnier / Tabor | 2:04.69 | Ireland |
| 2026 | Hotazhell | 4 | Shane Foley | Jessica Harrington | Silverton Hill Partnership | 2:02.53 | Ireland |

== See also ==
- Horse racing in Ireland
- List of Irish flat horse races
- Recurring sporting events established in 1976 – this race is included under its original title, Joe McGrath Memorial Stakes.
