= Economics (horse) =

British-bred racehorse

- Sire: Night of Thunder
- Grandsire: Dubawi
- Dam: La Pomme D'Amour
- Damsire: Peintre Celebre
- Sex: Stallion
- Foaled: 1 March 2021
- Died: February 27, 2026 (aged 4)
- Country: Great Britain
- Colour: Chestnut
- Breeder: Copgrove Hall Stud
- Owner: Isa Salman Al Khalifa
- Trainer: William Haggas
- Jockey: Tom Marquand
- Record: 7: 4-0-0
- Earnings: £937,623

Major wins
- Dante Stakes (2024); Prix Guillaume d'Ornano (2024); Irish Champion Stakes (2024)

Economics (1 March 2021 - 27 February 2026) was a British-bred racehorse that raced in Great Britain, France, and Ireland. He is best known for his victory in the 2024 edition of the Irish Champion Stakes over six-time Group One winner Auguste Rodin, the only Group One win of his career.

He would reach a peak IFHA rating of 123 in October 2024, joint fifth place in world rankings.

== Background ==
Economics is a chestnut stallion with a white blaze and three stockings.

He is sired by the successful sire Night of Thunder, winner of the Doncaster Stakes, 2000 Guineas, and the Lockinge Stakes and sire of Highfield Princess, Ombudsman, and Desert Flower. He is out of the mare La Pomme D'Amour, two-time winner of the group two Prix de Pomone.

He was bred by Copgrove Hall Stud in Yorkshire, who also bred Peintre Celebre (Economics' damsire), Amiloc, and Arcangues. He was later sold at the Tattersalls December foal sale for 42,000 guineas as a foal to Hazelwood Bloodstock then resold as a yearling, again at Tattersalls, to Highclere Agency for 160,000 guineas.

== Race record ==
Economics would make his only start as a two year old in the class four British EBF Novice Stakes at Newmarket, finishing fourth behind Zoum Zoum and ridden by Cieren Fallon.

His first win would come over a mile at Newbury, ridden by Tom Marquand who would ride him for the rest of his racing career. He would next win the Group Two Dante Stakes, the first Group-level win of his career, six lengths ahead of Ancient Wisdom. He was noted to have hit his head on the starting stalls, and a veterinary examination found that he had bled from his nose. Economics would be removed from the Epsom Derby race card a month prior to his Dante Stakes win, with trainer William Haggas citing the tight turnaround, Economics' immaturity, and the distance of the Derby as reasons to avoid the race. Instead, he would be chartered for a summer and autumn campaign, with the Irish Champion Stakes set as the long-term target.

Economics' next start would come three months later at Deauville in the Group two Prix Guillaume d'Ornano, finishing two lengths ahead of Jayarebe. It would be his first and only French start.

His first Group One race would be in the Irish Champion Stakes at Leopardstown, as planned after the Dante Stakes. He would finish a neck ahead of a strong field including later six-time Group One winning Auguste Rodin, Japanese raider Shin Emperor, and later three-time Group One winner Los Angeles. He would start next in the Champion Stakes, finishing sixth behind Anmaat, with a veterinary report after the race stating that he had bled again from the nose. It would be his last race for almost a year. In the meantime, he was sent to olympic medalist Laura Collett to be trained in flatwork.

Economics returned to the racecourse in 2025 at that year's Irish Champion Stakes. However, he would finish eighth in that race, and was found to have once again bled from his nose, leading to his retirement.

Economics would later be shipped to India, where he was to stand at stud at the Poonawalla Stud starting from the 2026 season. However, in February 2026, Economics showed symptoms of colic and, following a surgery, the horse developed colitis and died.

== Pedigree ==
Pedigree of Economics (GB), chestnut colt, 2021
| Sire Night of Thunder 2011 ch. | Dubawi; 2002 b. | Dubai Millennium | Seeking The Gold |
| Sire Night of Thunder 2011 ch. | Dubawi; 2002 b. | Dubai Millennium | Colorado Dancer |
| Sire Night of Thunder 2011 ch. | Dubawi; 2002 b. | Zomaradah | Deploy |
| Sire Night of Thunder 2011 ch. | Dubawi; 2002 b. | Zomaradah | Jawaher |
| Sire Night of Thunder 2011 ch. | Forest Storm; 2006 ch. | Galileo | Sadler's Wells |
| Sire Night of Thunder 2011 ch. | Forest Storm; 2006 ch. | Galileo | Urban Sea |
| Sire Night of Thunder 2011 ch. | Forest Storm; 2006 ch. | Quiet Storm | Desert Prince |
| Sire Night of Thunder 2011 ch. | Forest Storm; 2006 ch. | Quiet Storm | Hertford Castler |
| Dam La Pomme d'Amour 2008 ch. | Peintre Celebre; 1994 ch. | Nureyev | Northern Dancer |
| Dam La Pomme d'Amour 2008 ch. | Peintre Celebre; 1994 ch. | Nureyev | Special |
| Dam La Pomme d'Amour 2008 ch. | Peintre Celebre; 1994 ch. | Peinture Bleue | Alydar |
| Dam La Pomme d'Amour 2008 ch. | Peintre Celebre; 1994 ch. | Peinture Bleue | Petroleuse |
| Dam La Pomme d'Amour 2008 ch. | Winnebago; 1993 b. | Kris | Sharpen Up |
| Dam La Pomme d'Amour 2008 ch. | Winnebago; 1993 b. | Kris | Doubly Sure |
| Dam La Pomme d'Amour 2008 ch. | Winnebago; 1993 b. | Siouan | So Blessed |
| Dam La Pomme d'Amour 2008 ch. | Winnebago; 1993 b. | Siouan | Ardneasken |
