= Luxembourg (horse) =

Irish Thoroughbred racehorse

- Racing silks of Westerberg, Magnier, Tabor & Smith
- Sire: Camelot
- Grandsire: Montjeu
- Dam: Attire
- Damsire: Danehill Dancer
- Sex: Colt
- Foaled: 24 March 2019
- Country: Ireland
- Colour: Bay
- Breeder: Ben Sangster
- Owner: Westerberg, Magnier, Tabor & Smith
- Trainer: Aidan O'Brien
- Record: 16: 7-2-1
- Earnings: £2,612,411

Major wins
- Beresford Stakes (2021); Vertem Futurity Trophy (2021); Royal Whip Stakes (2022); Irish Champion Stakes (2022); Tattersalls Gold Cup (2023); Coronation Cup (2024)
- Last updated on May 31, 2024

Luxembourg (foaled 24 March 2019) is an Irish Thoroughbred racehorse. He was one of the best European two-year-olds in 2021 when he was unbeaten in three races, including the Beresford Stakes in Ireland and the Group One Vertem Futurity Trophy in England. As a three-year-old, the horse won the Group One Irish Champion Stakes.

== Background ==
Luxembourg is a bay colt with a white star and white socks on his hind legs bred in Ireland by Ben Sangster. As a yearling in October 2020 he was consigned to the Tattersalls sale and was bought for 150,000 guineas by Michael Magnier on behalf of his father, John Magnier's Coolmore Stud organisation. He was sent into training with Aidan O'Brien at Ballydoyle. He is owned by the Coolmore partners Susan Magnier, Michael Tabor and Derrick Smith in partnership with Georg von Opel.

He was from the fifth crop of foals sired by Camelot who won the 2000 Guineas and the Epsom Derby in 2012. His other foals have included Even So, Sir Dragonet (Cox Plate) and Santa Barbara (Beverly D. Stakes). Luxembourg's dam Attire showed little racing ability, failing to win in seven attempts, but did better as a broodmare, producing the Mooresbridge Stakes winner Leo de Fury. She was a granddaughter of the French broodmare Albertine, whose other descendants have included Arcangues, Aquarelliste and Cape Verdi.

== Racing career ==
=== 2021: two-year-old season ===
Luxembourg's first race was over one mile at Killarney Racecourse on 14 July when he was ridden by Michael Hussey and started the 5/2 favourite in an eight-runner field. After starting slowly he moved up to take the lead a furlong from the finish and drew away to win "readily" by two and a quarter lengths from Tuwaiq. Seamie Heffernan took the ride when the colt was stepped up in class and went off the 8/13 favourite for the Group 2 Beresford Stakes over the same distance at the Curragh on 25 September. Tuwaiq was again in opposition but the best-fancied of his four opponents was the Joseph Patrick O'Brien-trained Swan Bay. Although he raced last of the five runners, Luxembourg was never far behind the front-running Tuwaiq and went to the front entering the final furlong. He accelerated away from his rivals in the closing stages and came home almost five lengths clear of the runner-up Manu Et Corde. After the race Heffernan said "He’s very smart at home and he’s proven it twice now. I was very impressed – very talented, very smooth. The most impressive thing about him is he knows he’s good and he doesn’t show it off. He doesn’t show you until you press the button and say ‘give us a look’... The turn of foot he showed me today was pretty exciting. I’m not sure what he’s going to be targeted at, but he couldn’t have done that any easier."

For his final race of the season, Luxembourg was sent to England for the Group 1 Vertem Futurity Trophy over one mile on soft ground at Doncaster Racecourse on 23 October. He was made the 4/6 favourite against seven opponents including the Group 2 winners Bayside Boy (Champagne Stakes) and Royal Patronage (Royal Lodge Stakes). Ridden by Ryan Moore, he raced in mid-division as Royal Patronage set the pace, before gaining the advantage entering the last quarter mile. He "kept on well" in the closing stages and never looked in serious danger of defeat, winning by one and three quarter lengths from Sissoko. Aidan O'Brien, who was winning the race for the tenth time, commented "He's always been very exciting. Everything he's done from day one. He's a big horse, he travels very well, everything seems right with him. Today he had to get down and stretch in the last furlong, which was good for him really. He was very babyish in front but he's a lovely horse... He has a big open stride but that's what good horses have."

== Pedigree ==
Pedigree of Luxembourg (IRE), bay colt, 2019
Sire Camelot (GB) 2009	Montjeu (IRE); 1996	Sadler's Wells (USA)	Northern Dancer (CAN)
Sire Camelot (GB) 2009	Montjeu (IRE); 1996	Sadler's Wells (USA)	Fairy Bridge
Sire Camelot (GB) 2009	Montjeu (IRE); 1996	Floripedes (FR)	Top Ville (IRE)
Sire Camelot (GB) 2009	Montjeu (IRE); 1996	Floripedes (FR)	Toute Cy
Sire Camelot (GB) 2009	Tarfah (USA); 2001	Kingmambo	Mr Prospector
Sire Camelot (GB) 2009	Tarfah (USA); 2001	Kingmambo	Miesque
Sire Camelot (GB) 2009	Tarfah (USA); 2001	Fickle (GB)	Danehill
Sire Camelot (GB) 2009	Tarfah (USA); 2001	Fickle (GB)	Fade
Dam Attire (IRE) 2009	Danehill Dancer (IRE); 1993	Danehill (USA)	Danzig
Dam Attire (IRE) 2009	Danehill Dancer (IRE); 1993	Danehill (USA)	Razyana
Dam Attire (IRE) 2009	Danehill Dancer (IRE); 1993	Mira Adonde (USA)	Sharpen Up (GB)
Dam Attire (IRE) 2009	Danehill Dancer (IRE); 1993	Mira Adonde (USA)	Lettre d'Amour
Dam Attire (IRE) 2009	Asnieres (USA); 1992	Spend A Buck	Buckaroo
Dam Attire (IRE) 2009	Asnieres (USA); 1992	Spend A Buck	Belle de Jour
Dam Attire (IRE) 2009	Asnieres (USA); 1992	Albertine (FR)	Irish River
Dam Attire (IRE) 2009	Asnieres (USA); 1992	Albertine (FR)	Almyre (Family: 8-f)

- Luxembourg was inbred 3 × 4 to Danehill, meaning that this stallion appears in both the third and fourth generations of his pedigree.
