= Ryan Moore (jockey) =

British jockey (born 1983)

Ryan Moore MBE
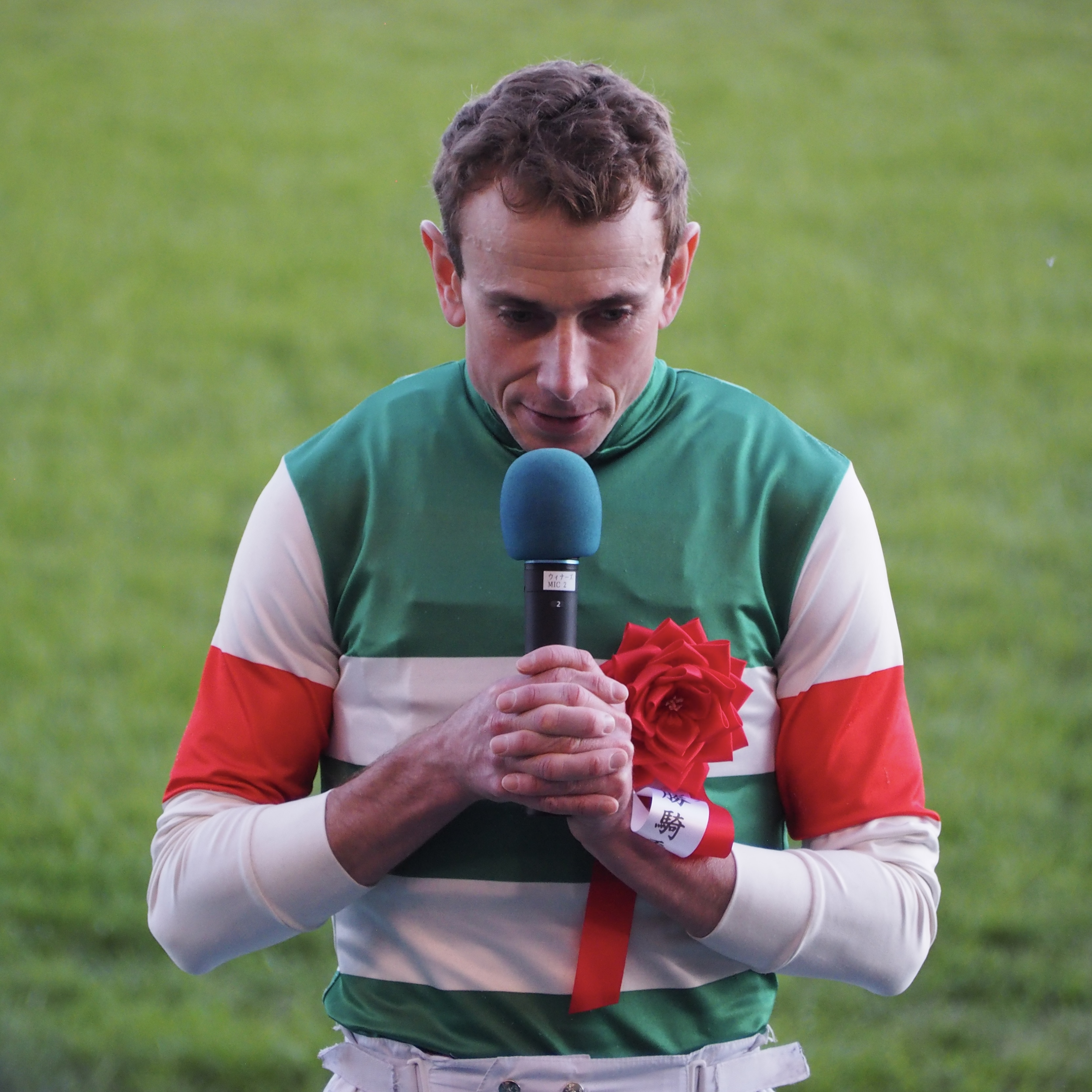
- Moore after winning the Japan Cup in 2022

Personal information
- Full name: Ryan Lee Moore
- Born: 18 September 1983 (age 43) Brighton, East Sussex, England
- Occupation: Jockey
- Height: 5 ft 7 in (1.70 m)
- Weight: 8 st 2 lb (114 lb; 52 kg)

Horse racing career
- Sport: Horse racing
- Career wins: 3000+

Major racing wins
- Major race wins: 2,000 Guineas (2015, 2017); 1,000 Guineas (2012, 2015, 2016, 2020); Epsom Derby (2010, 2013, 2023, 2024); Epsom Oaks (2010, 2016, 2020, 2022, 2025); St Leger Stakes (2017, 2018, 2023); King George VI and Queen Elizabeth Stakes (2009, 2016); Prix de l'Arc de Triomphe (2010, 2016); Japan Cup (2013, 2022); Melbourne Cup (2014); Breeders' Cup Turf (2008, 2009, 2013, 2015, 2023) Pegasus World Cup Turf (2024)

Racing awards
- British flat racing Champion Apprentice (2003); British flat racing Champion Jockey 3 times (2006, 2008, 2009); Lester Awards; Apprentice Jockey of the Year (2003); Flat Jockey of the Year (2006, 2008, 2009, 2014); Longines World's Best Jockey (2014, 2016, 2021, 2023)

Honours
- British Racing Hall of Fame (2026)

Significant horses
- Notnowcato, Workforce, Snow Fairy, Conduit, Ruler of the World, Highland Reel, Gleneagles, Minding, Maurice, Churchill, Magical, St Mark's Basilica, Auguste Rodin, Paddington, City of Troy

1000 Guineas (4)
2012
Homecoming Queen	Starscope	Maybe
2015
Legatissimo	Lucida	Tiggy Wiggy
2016
Minding	Ballydoyle	Alice Springs
2020
Love	Cloak Of Spirits	Quadrilateral

2000 Guineas (2)
2015
Gleneagles	Territories	Ivawood
2017
Churchill	Barney Roy	Al Wukair

Derby (4)
2010
Workforce	At First Sight	Rewilding
2013
Ruler of the World	Libertarian	Galileo Rock
2023
Auguste Rodin	King Of Steel	White Birch
2024
City Of Troy	Ambiente Friendly	Los Angeles

Oaks (4)
2010
Snow Fairy	Meeznah	Remember When
2016
Minding	Architecture	Harlequeen
2020
Love	Ennistymon	Frankly Darling
2022
Tuesday	Emily Upjohn	Nashwa
2025
Minnie Hauk	Whirl	Desert Flower

St Leger (3)
2017
Capri	Crystal Ocean	Stradivarius
2018
Kew Gardens	Lah Ti Dar	Southern France
2023
Continuous	Arrest	Desert Hero

Ryan Lee Moore MBE (born 18 September 1983) is an English flat racing jockey, who was Champion Jockey in 2006, 2008 and 2009. He is currently the first choice jockey for Aidan O'Brien's Ballydoyle operation, a role in which he mainly rides horses owned by Coolmore Stud. He also sometimes rides horses for Juddmonte and The Royal Family. As of 2024, Moore has ridden over 200 Group and Grade 1 winners internationally. He has the most British Group & Listed wins of any active jockey.

== Personal life ==
Moore is the son of successful trainer and former jump jockey Gary L. Moore, and brother to jump jockeys Jamie Moore and Joshua Moore, and top amateur jockey Hayley Moore. He has four children.

He is the grandson of trainer Charlie Moore, a well-known character who lived close to Brighton Racecourse. Charlie was also a second-hand car salesman, and many stories have circulated about his dual career, including how he swapped three truck tyres in exchange for a filly, and how he started training when he accidentally bought a horse by raising his hand at auction. He is also close to Gary's sister, his aunt Candy, who is also a jockey.

Moore considers himself the laziest of the family. He was appointed a Member of the Order of the British Empire (MBE) in the 2026 Birthday Honours for services to Horseracing and to British Sport.

== Career ==
Moore starting riding at four, introduced to it by his grandfather, and then with the pony club. However, he didn't enjoy cross-country and showjumping; finding it a "bit tame", he decided to pursue competitive racing instead. National Hunt jockey AP McCoy rode for Moore's father when in his teens and Moore, aged 12, led him over hurdles as they schooled horses. Moore was influenced by his drive and dedication. "He wanted to ride everything in the yard. His work ethic was huge," he told an interviewer.

Unlike his siblings, who knew from an early age that they wanted to race, this was not always clear to Moore. Football was another passion, and he had trials with Brighton and Hove Albion.

Moore's first wins came as a 16-year-old, which is when he decided to take up racing as a career, although his mother Jayne tried to persuade him to stay at school and complete his A-levels believing he wouldn't make it in racing. At one point, he too did not consider himself good enough. During his A-levels, he was taking days off to ride, but this only lasted one term before he gave up.

Moore rode winners for his grandfather, who died in 2000. "I was close to him and won a couple of races before he died in 2000. I like to think it made him happy, that it brought him something at the end of his life. I'm glad he saw it." At 16, he weighed 8st 10 lb, but by the time he became champion apprentice he had to get down to 7st 13 lb.

=== Richard Hannon ===
Moore's first mentor was Richard Hannon, a trainer for whom he would still be winning big races when Hannon retired in 2013. He was sent to Hannon by his father. At the end of his first full season, he won the Cesarewitch Handicap and had Group race experience.

His first major victory came for a different trainer, though, when he won the 2002 Cesarewitch Handicap for Martin Pipe on Miss Fara on 19 October 2002. He got his first black type victory later that same year when winning the Listed Jebel Ali Stakes in the United Arab Emirates shortly after Christmas 2002. He didn't score any major victories in 2003, and had a strike rate of under 10%, but it was enough for him to become Champion Apprentice.

2004 saw him top 100 winners and £1 million in prize money for the first time and on 29 August, he won his first group race, the Group 3 Prestige Stakes at Goodwood. For Hannon, he then won his first Group 2 race, taking the Mill Reef Stakes on Galleota in September.

=== Sir Michael Stoute ===
Increasingly, Moore rode for Sir Michael Stoute, sharing those duties with Kerrin McEvoy, Mick Kinane and others after Kieren Fallon quit as stable jockey to ride for Aidan O'Brien. It was for Stoute he had his first Group 1 win, on Notnowcato in the Juddmonte International at York in August 2006. That year he won his first jockeys' title which came as a surprise to him. He had said that the odds of 8/1 on him becoming champion at the start of the season were too generous, but he had expected to finish third. Commentators were suggesting that his "resilience and iron will should turn Moore into one of racing's iconic figures." In 2006, he was riding at 8st 5 lb most days.

In 2007, he rode Notnowcato to victory in the Tattersalls Gold Cup in Ireland, and in the Eclipse. For the latter race, Moore took the horse down the stands side, while the remainder of the field including odds-on favourite and Derby winner Authorized and George Washington raced on the other side of the track.

In that year, Stoute horses gave him 47 of his 126 wins, overtaking Hannon (33 winners) as his primary stable. Moore spent three months injured during the season, preventing him from retaining his title, but a late season crop of victories meant he still finished third in the jockeys table.

These efforts were rewarded when he was offered the job as stable jockey at the end of the 2007 season, while he was in Tokyo, riding Papal Bull in the Japan Cup. Hannon meanwhile would make more use of his son-in-law Richard Hughes (jockey), after his retainer with Khaled Abdullah came to an end. Moore would later say of Stoute, "he's just a very clever man – an unbelievable brain."

On the Thursday of Glorious Goodwood in 2007, Moore won four races, including the Goodwood Cup on Allegretto. It is thought he would have won the 2007 jockeys' championship if he hadn't broken his arm in a fall. He would win it again in 2008.

In April 2009, he rode winners at Sandown Park, Sha Tin in Hong Kong, and Windsor on consecutive days, the 36-hour trip to the Far East winning him nearly £50,000 after he won the Queen Elizabeth II Cup on Presvis, trained by Luca Cumani. That summer, he won the King George VI and Queen Elizabeth Stakes on Conduit for Stoute. The first three, all trained by Stoute, came together, leading to a steward's inquiry, but Conduit kept the result.

Over the course of 2009 and 2010, he swept the big races of the world. He won at the Breeders' Cup in the autumn after sealing a third jockeys' title. Then he won the 2010 Derby on Workforce in a course record time, and the Oaks on consecutive days. He crowned the year with another win on Workforce in the Prix de l'Arc de Triomphe. A broken wrist cost him another chance at the jockeys' title, but he was already being spoken of as an all-time great by some commentators. Former jockey Willie Carson suggested he could be as good as Lester Piggott and predicted he would recapture the jockeys' title in 2011.

However, his attention was beginning to shift from pursuing the title, to concentrating on fewer, bigger races instead. He clarified that with a family, he was no longer keen to travel the country in pursuit of another title. He said, "The big races are becoming a massive draw for me. That's the way it has happened with a lot of top jockeys... I understand why Frankie [Dettori] competes in fewer races. It's understandable, with our schedule." His chances of winning the title took a blow in any case, when he missed two months after injuring himself at Goodwood in July.

He was now riding for several celebrity owners. He rode for many of the Manchester United team including Michael Owen, Paul Scholes, Ashley Cole and manager Alex Ferguson. Moore also rode the Queen's Carlton House to victory in the Dante Stakes at York Racecourse and then to a close 3rd in the Epsom Derby. He finished 2011 by winning a Japanese Grade One on Snow Fairy for the second year running.

=== Aidan O'Brien ===
O'Brien was rumoured to be lining up Moore as stable jockey from November 2011. Moore was keen on the job, but reluctant to move his family from Newmarket to County Tipperary. They negotiated a compromise that allowed Moore to live in England, while riding for O'Brien in Ireland at the major meetings.

Instead, O'Brien's son Joseph became the main rider for Ballydoyle. Moore rode for O'Brien when the trainer had multiple runners. In that way he won the 2012 1,000 Guineas on Homecoming Queen and the 2013 Derby on Ruler Of The World.

He finished fourth in the jockeys' championship of 2012, and runner-up in 2013, behind Richard Hughes. He again finished runner-up in the jockeys' championship of 2014.

By 2015, Joseph O'Brien, at nearly 6 ft tall, was struggling to make the weight to ride in the major races and his father Aidan needed a replacement. In April, it was confirmed that Moore would ride Ballydoyle's runners in the Classics and other significant races. O'Brien explained the arrangement thus: "Ryan will be riding our main horses this year and Joseph will be riding other horses when the weights allow him to. Seamie Heffernan and Colm O’Donoghue will also be involved as in the past."

By the end of the 2017 season, Moore had won over 2,000 races in Britain, the third most of all active jockeys, behind only Frankie Dettori and Joe Fanning, both of whom had been riding for a decade longer.

To date, Moore has ridden three Derby winners for O'Brien - Ruler of the World in 2013 and then successive victories on Auguste Rodin and City of Troy in 2023 and 2024.

== Statistics ==
Flat wins in Great Britain by year

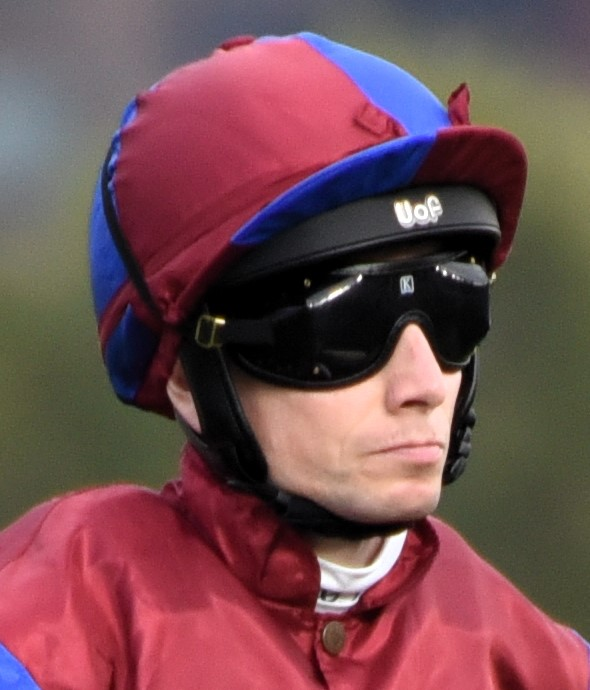
Ryan Moore racing for the Hong Kong Cup 2023

Year	Wins	Runs	Strike rate	Total earnings
2000	6	13	46	£20,647
2001	0	34	0	£2,556
2002	39	386	10	£422,170
2003	59	627	9	£519,326
2004	132	1008	13	£1,496,166
2005	120	1041	12	£1,655,300
2006	182	1174	16	£2,720,806
2007	128	675	19	£2,506,275
2008	192	1020	19	£3,643,975
2009	178	874	20	£4,870,880
2010	138	784	18	£3,928,871
2011	101	531	19	£2,641,586
2012	116	603	19	£2,468,765
2013	194	899	22	£4,510,605
2014	162	774	21	£4,380,299
2015	81	381	21	£5,038,613
2016	103	462	22	£8,085,949
2017	137	572	24	£8,147,675
2018	85	477	18	£5,131,556
2019	71	443	16	£5,179,345
2020	80	480	17	£2,614,276
2021	86	442	19	£4,244,026
2022	68	380	18	£4,907,476
2023	57	298	19	£7,604,481
2024	56	245	23	£8,154,806
2025	43	197	22	£5,581,753

== Major wins ==
(United Kingdom) Great Britain

- 1000 Guineas – (4) – Homecoming Queen (2012), Legatissimo (2015), Minding (2016), Love (2020)
- 2000 Guineas – (2) – Gleneagles (2015), Churchill (2017)
- Ascot Gold Cup – (5) – Estimate (2013), Order of St George (2016), Kyprios (2022, 2024), Scandinavia (2026)
- British Champions Fillies and Mares Stakes – (3) – Hydrangea (2017), Magical (2018), Minnie Hauk (2026)
- Cheveley Park Stakes – (4) – Clemmie (2017), Tenebrism (2021), Lake Victoria (2024), Sun Goddess (2026)
- Commonwealth Cup – (1) – Caravaggio (2017)
- Coronation Cup – (5) – Ask (2009), St Nicholas Abbey (2011), Highland Reel (2017), Luxembourg (2024), Jan Brueghel (2025)
- Coronation Stakes – (3) – Rizeena (2014), Winter (2017), Precise (2026)
- Epsom Derby – (4) – Workforce (2010), Ruler of the World (2013), Auguste Rodin (2023), City of Troy (2024)
- Dewhurst Stakes – (6) – Beethoven (2009), Air Force Blue (2015), Churchill (2016), U S Navy Flag (2017), City of Troy (2023), Darkness Falls (2026)
- Diamond Jubilee Stakes – (3) – Twilight Son (2016), Merchant Navy (2018), Dream of Dreams (2021)
- Eclipse Stakes – (6) – Notnowcato (2007), St Mark's Basilica (2021), Paddington (2023), City of Troy (2024), Delacroix (2025), Constitution River (2026)
- Falmouth Stakes – (4) – Integral (2014), Alice Springs (2016), Roly Poly (2017), Porta Fortuna (2024)
- Fillies' Mile – (3) – Minding (2015), Rhododendron (2016), Ylang Ylang (2023)
- International Stakes – (3) – Notnowcato (2006), Japan (2019), City of Troy (2024)
- Goodwood Cup – (4) – Allegretto (2007), Kyprios (2022, 2024), Scandinavia (2026)
- July Cup – (2) – U S Navy Flag (2018), Ten Sovereigns (2019)
- King George VI and Queen Elizabeth Stakes – (2) – Conduit (2009), Highland Reel (2016)
- King Charles III Stakes – (1) – Mission Central (2026)
- Lockinge Stakes – (1) – Rhododendron (2018)
- Oaks – (5) – Snow Fairy (2010), Minding (2016), Love (2020), Tuesday (2022), Minnie Hauk (2025)
- Nassau Stakes – (6) – Minding (2016), Winter (2017), Fancy Blue (2020), Opera Singer (2024), Whirl (2025), Diamond Necklace (2026)
- Middle Park Stakes – (1) – Blackbeard (2022)
- Prince of Wales's Stakes – (3) – Highland Reel (2017), Love (2021), Auguste Rodin (2024)
- Queen Anne Stakes – (1) – Circus Maximus (2020)
- Queen Elizabeth II Stakes – (1) – Minding (2016)
- Vertem Futurity Trophy – (3) – Saxon Warrior (2017), Luxembourg (2021), Auguste Rodin (2022)
- St James's Palace Stakes – (3) – Gleneagles (2015), Circus Maximus (2019), Paddington (2023)
- St Leger Stakes – (3) – Capri (2017), Kew Gardens (2018), Continuous (2023)
- Sun Chariot Stakes – (3) – Integral (2014), Alice Springs (2016), Roly Poly (2017)
- Sussex Stakes – (2) – The Gurkha (2016), Paddington (2023)
- Yorkshire Oaks – (5) – Tapestry (2014), Love (2020), Snowfall (2021), Content (2024), Minnie Hauk (2025)

Australia

- Cox Plate – (1) – Adelaide (2014)
- Golden Slipper – (1) – Shinzo (2023)
- Mackinnon Stakes – (1) – Magic Wand (2019)
- Melbourne Cup – (1) – Protectionist (2014)
- Ranvet Stakes – (1) – Dubai Honour (2023)

Canada

- Canadian International Stakes – (3) – Joshua Tree (2013), Hillstar (2014), Cannock Chase (2015)
- E. P. Taylor Stakes – (1) – Curvy (2015)

France

- Critérium de Saint-Cloud – (1) – Drumbeat (2026)
- Critérium International – (2) – Johannes Vermeer (2015), Twain (2024)
- Grand Prix de Paris – (2) – Kew Gardens (2018), Japan (2019)
- Grand Prix de Saint-Cloud – (2) – Spanish Moon (2009), Novellist (2013)
- Poule d'Essai des Poulains – (2) – The Gurkha (2016), Henri Matisse (2025)
- Prix de l'Arc de Triomphe – (2) – Workforce (2010), Found (2016)
- Prix de Diane – (1) – Diamond Necklace (2026)
- Poule d'Essai des Pouliches – (1) – Diamond Necklace (2026)
- Prix de la Forêt – (1) – True Love (2026)
- Prix du Cadran – (3) – High Jinx (2014), Kyprios (2022, 2024)
- Prix Jean Prat – (1) – Tenebrism (2022)
- Prix du Jockey-Club – (3) – The Grey Gatsby (2014), Camille Pissarro (2025), Constitution River (2026)
- Prix du Moulin de Longchamp – (1) – Circus Maximus (2019)
- Prix Jean-Luc Lagardère – (1) – Happily (2017)
- Prix Marcel Boussac – (3) – Found (2014), Ballydoyle (2015), Opera Singer (2023)
- Prix Maurice de Gheest – (1) – King's Apostle (2009)
- Prix Morny – (2) Blackbeard (2022), Whistlejacket (2024)
- Prix Rothschild – (2) – Roly Poly (2017), Mother Earth (2021)
- Prix Royal-Oak – (3) – Allegretto (2007), Ask (2009), Queenstown (2026)
- Prix Saint-Alary – (1) – Above The Curve (2022)

Germany

- Bayerisches Zuchtrennen – (1) – Linngari (2008)

Hong Kong

- Hong Kong Classic Cup – (1) – Sun Jewellery (2016)
- Hong Kong Classic Mile – (1) – Sun Jewellery (2016)
- Hong Kong Derby – (1) – Ping Hai Star (2018)
- Hong Kong Cup – (2) – Snow Fairy (2010), Maurice (2016)
- Hong Kong Mile – (1) – Maurice (2015)
- Hong Kong Sprint – (2) – Danon Smash (2020), Wellington (2022)
- Hong Kong Vase – (3) – Highland Reel (2015, 2017), Mogul (2020)
- Queen Elizabeth II Cup – (1) – Presvis (2009)

(Republic of Ireland) Ireland

- Irish 1,000 Guineas – (4) – Marvellous (2014), Winter (2017), Hermosa (2019), Lake Victoria (2025)
- Irish 2,000 Guineas – (4) – Gleneagles (2015), Churchill (2017), Paddington (2023), Gstaad (2026)
- Irish Champion Stakes – (5) – The Grey Gatsby (2014), Magical (2019), St Mark's Basilica (2021), Luxembourg (2022), Auguste Rodin (2023)
- Irish Derby – (4) – Auguste Rodin (2023), Los Angeles (2024), Lambourn (2025), Benvenuto Cellini (2026)
- Irish Oaks – (4) – Snow Fairy (2010), Snowfall (2021), Savethelastdance (2023), Minnie Hauk (2025)
- Irish St Leger – (5) – Order of St George (2017), Flag of Honour (2018), Kyprios (2022, 2024), Scandinavia (2026)
- Matron Stakes – (2) – Echelon (2007), Alice Springs (2016)
- Phoenix Stakes – (3) – Sioux Nation (2017), Little Big Bear (2022), Sun Goddess (2026)
- Pretty Polly Stakes – (3) – Promising Lead (2008), Minding (2016), Whirl (2025)
- Tattersalls Gold Cup – (4) – So You Think (2011), Magical (2019), Luxembourg (2023), Los Angeles (2025)
- Moyglare Stud Stakes – (3) – Love (2019), Shale (2020), Sun Goddess (2026)
- Flying Five Stakes – (1) – Fairyland (2019)
- Vincent O'Brien National Stakes – (2) – Churchill (2016), Henry Longfellow (2023)
- Golden Fleece Stakes – (1) – Darkness Falls (2026)

Italy

- Gran Criterium – (1) – Scintillo (2007)

Japan

- Asahi Hai Futurity Stakes – (2) – Asia Express (2013), Salios (2019)
- Champions Cup – (1) – Gold Dream (2017)
- Japan Cup – (2) – Gentildonna (2013), Vela Azul (2022)
- Mile Championship – (1) – Maurice (2015)
- Queen Elizabeth II Commemorative Cup – (2) – Snow Fairy (2010, 2011)
- Tennō Shō (Autumn) – (1) – Maurice (2016)

United Arab Emirates

- Al Quoz Sprint – (1) – Extravagant Kid (2021)
- Dubai Golden Shaheen – (1) – Sibelius (2023)
- Dubai Turf – (2) – Presvis (2011), Real Steel (2016)
- Dubai Sheema Classic – (1) – Gentildonna (2014)
- Jebel Hatta – (1) – Presvis (2010)

United States

- Belmont Derby – (1) – Bolshoi Ballet (2021)
- Belmont Oaks – (2) – Athena (2018), Santa Barbara (2021)
- Beverly D. Stakes – (3) – Dank (2013), Euro Charline (2014), Santa Barbara (2021)
- Breeders' Cup Filly and Mare Turf – (2) – Dank (2013), Tuesday (2022)
- Breeders' Cup Juvenile Fillies Turf – (3) – Meditate (2022), Lake Victoria (2024), Sun Goddess (2026)
- Breeders' Cup Juvenile Turf – (8) – Wrote (2011), George Vancouver (2012), Hit It A Bomb (2015), Mendelssohn (2017), Victoria Road (2022), Unquestionable (2023), Henri Matisse (2024), Haffner (2026)
- Breeders' Cup Turf – (6) – Conduit (2008, 2009), Magician (2013), Found (2015), Auguste Rodin (2023), Benvenuto Cellini (2026)
- Pegasus World Cup Turf Invitational – (1) – Warm Heart (2024)
- Secretariat Stakes – (1) – Adelaide (2014)

== Year-end charts in the United States ==
Chart (2009–present)	Peak position
National Earnings List for Jockeys 2009	70
National Earnings List for Jockeys 2013	28
National Earnings List for Jockeys 2015	43

== See also ==
- List of jockeys

Sporting positions
Preceded by Joseph O'Brien	Ballydoyle retained jockey 2015–	Succeeded by Incumbent
