= Bath Racecourse =

Horse racing venue in England

Coordinates: 51°25′N 2°25′W

Bath

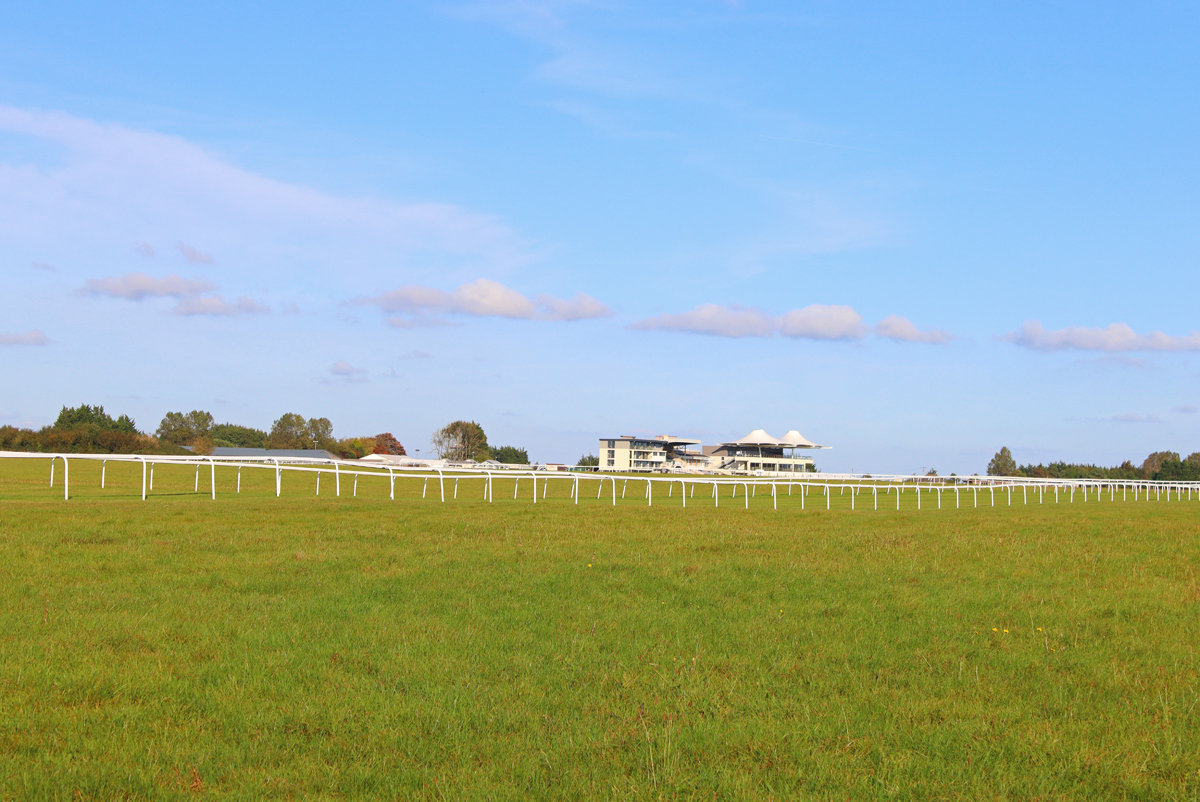
- The stands from a distance
- Interactive map of Bath
- Location: Bath, Somerset
- Owned by: Arena Racing Company
- Screened on: Sky Sports Racing
- Course type: Flat

Bath Racecourse is a thoroughbred horse racing venue on Lansdown Hill, about 3 1/4 miles (5.2 km) northeast of Bath, Somerset, England. It is owned and operated by Arena Racing Company.

The racecourse is a left-handed oval track of 1 mile 4 furlongs and 25 yards, with a run-in of nearly half-a-mile. The home straight is 4 furlongs, with a steady rise and turn. It is the highest flat racecourse in the country and has no watering facility, so the going can become very firm during a dry summer.

At 780 feet (238 m) above sea level, Bath is Britain's highest flat racecourse, although National Hunt courses Hexham and Exeter are higher.

== History ==
Racing was first recorded at Bath in 1728. In 1811, the first major meet at Bath Racecourse was held, under the auspices of a local family, the Blathwayts. Originally there was just one meet a year at the course, lasting for two days, but gradually over the years, the number of meets increased to its present level of twenty-two. In the early years, the Somerset Stakes was the major race of the calendar, and this race is still held annually. In 1844 this race was a sweepstake of 25 sovereigns each with £100 added by the committee. It was won by the Duke of Richmond's Red Deer, a three-year-ol carrying 4st 11ibs, who went on to win the Chester Cup. The owner of the second got his £25 back, but the winner had to pay £10 for preparing the course and £5 for weights and scales.

There were a number of grandstand buildings in those days and people used to watch the races from their carriages, lined up beside the track.

During World War II, the racecourse was used as a landing field by the Royal Air Force and named RAF North Stoke.

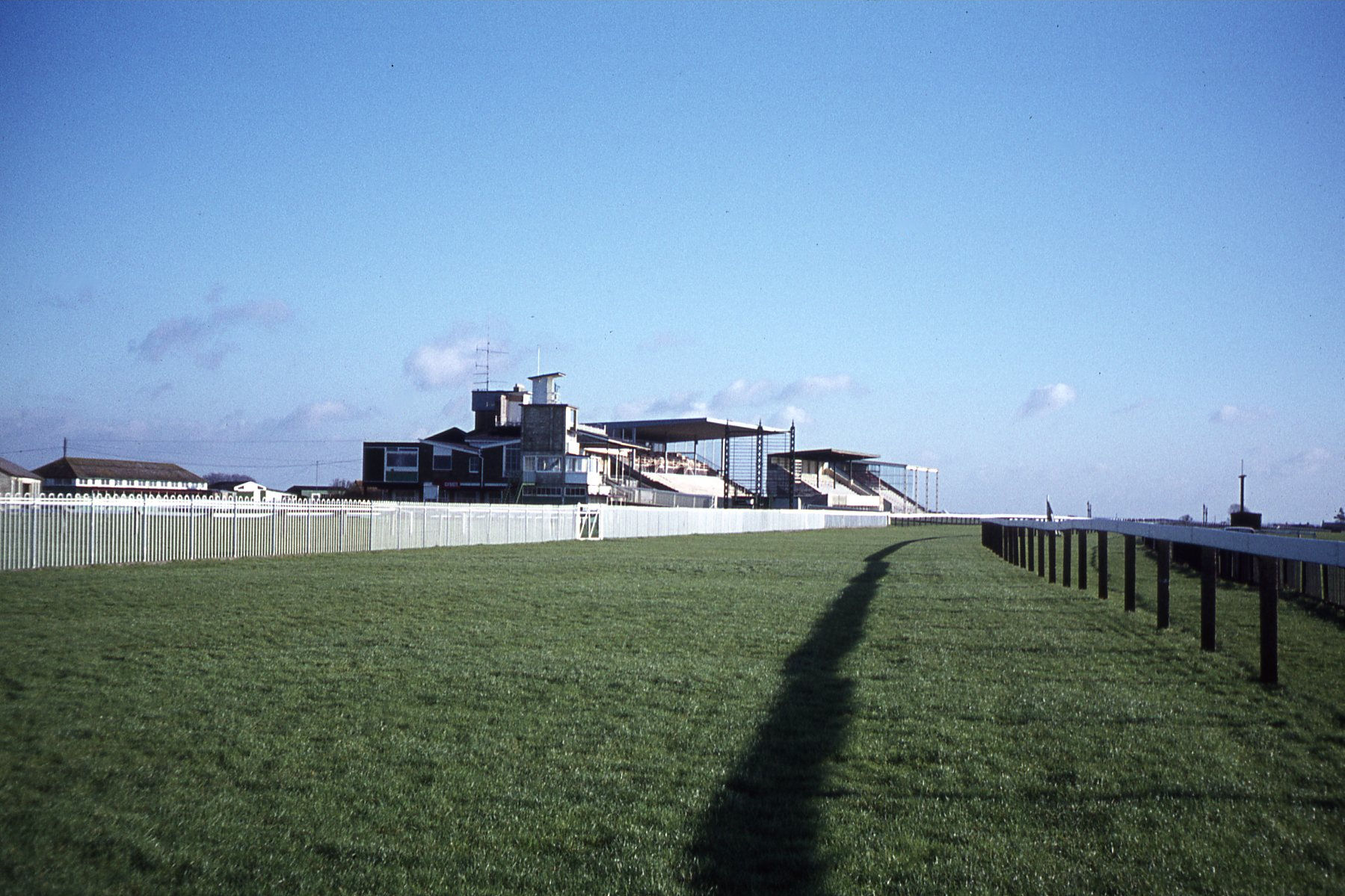
The racecourse in 1977

In 1953, Bath Racecourse was the site of a criminal plot surrounding the "Spa selling plate". Having two horses that looked almost identical, the gang substituted a good horse for a poor one called Francasal. They bet heavily on the substituted horse and damaged the power supply to the racecourse, which prevented the bookmakers from changing the odds which remained at 10–1. The horse won the race and the gang would have profited highly had not racing officials become suspicious and called in Scotland Yard. The gang were subsequently brought to justice.

In 1971 and 1972, the racecourse was closed for rebuilding. This resulted in the June meeting (televised by the BBC) on the Saturday before Royal Ascot being transferred to Newmarket in both those years.

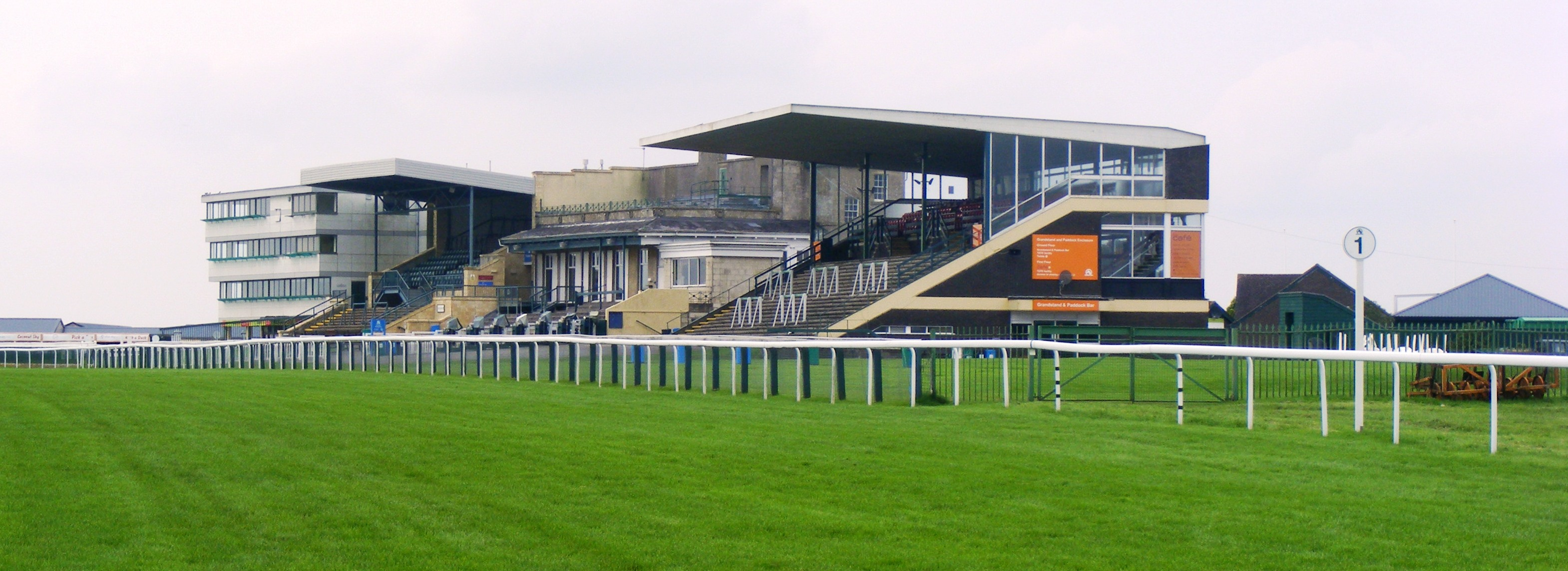
The stands in 2008, before the 2010s refurbishment

In 2015–2016 the racecourse facilities underwent a redevelopment and investment programme, funded by the Arena Racing Company. The racetrack was given a new look with bands of buttermilk and French grey, the parade ring revamped and the Beckford Bar opened. The new Langridge Grandstand opened in July 2016; its facilities include a canopied roof garden from which races can be watched. It is also available as a venue between race days for corporate events, dinners and weddings.

In 2024 there are 20 fixtures between April and October.

== Notable races ==
Month	DOW	Race Name	Type	Grade	Distance	Age/Sex
April	Friday	Lansdown Fillies' Stakes	Flat	Listed	5f 11m	3+ f
October	Monday	Beckford Stakes	Flat	Listed	1m 6f	3+ f

- Dick Hern Fillies' Stakes (now run at Haydock Park)
