= Cassandra Go =

Irish-bred Thoroughbred racehorse

- Breed: Thoroughbred
- Sire: Indian Ridge
- Grandsire: Ahonoora
- Dam: Rahaam
- Damsire: Secreto
- Sex: Mare
- Foaled: 30 June 1996
- Country: Ireland
- Color: Grey
- Breeder: John McKay
- Owner: Trevor Stewart
- Trainer: Geoff Wragg
- Record: 17: 6-4-1
- Earnings: £243,262

Major wins
- Lansdown Fillies' Stakes (2000); King George Stakes (2000); Temple Stakes (2001); King's Stand Stakes (2001)

Cassandra Go (2 April 1996 – 23 June 2021) was a grey Thoroughbred mare from Indian Ridge, out of the mare Rahaam by Secreto. She was a retired racehorse, who was previously a top-class sprinter.

== Racing career ==
Cassandra Go's wins consisted of the Temple Stakes, King's Stand Stakes, and the King George Stakes. She was retired to become a breeding mare.

== Breeding record ==
One of her most notable offspring is Halfway to Heaven, who won the Nassau Stakes. Cassandra Go died on 23 June 2021 at the age of 25.

== Pedigree ==
Pedigree of Cassandra Go
Sire Indian Ridge	Ahonoora	Lorenzaccio	Klairon
Sire Indian Ridge	Ahonoora	Lorenzaccio	Phoenissa
Sire Indian Ridge	Ahonoora	Helen Nichols	Martial
Sire Indian Ridge	Ahonoora	Helen Nichols	Quaker Girl
Sire Indian Ridge	Hillbrow	Swing Easy	Delta Judge
Sire Indian Ridge	Hillbrow	Swing Easy	Free Flowing
Sire Indian Ridge	Hillbrow	Golden City	Skymaster
Sire Indian Ridge	Hillbrow	Golden City	West Shaw
Dam Rahaam	Secreto	Northern Dancer	Nearctic
Dam Rahaam	Secreto	Northern Dancer	Natalma
Dam Rahaam	Secreto	Betty's Secret	Secretariat
Dam Rahaam	Secreto	Betty's Secret	Betty Loraine
Dam Rahaam	Fager's Glory	Mr. Prospector	Raise a Native
Dam Rahaam	Fager's Glory	Mr. Prospector	Gold Digger
Dam Rahaam	Fager's Glory	Streets Glory	Dr. Fager
Dam Rahaam	Fager's Glory	Streets Glory	Native Street
