= Georg von Opel =

Swiss billionaire

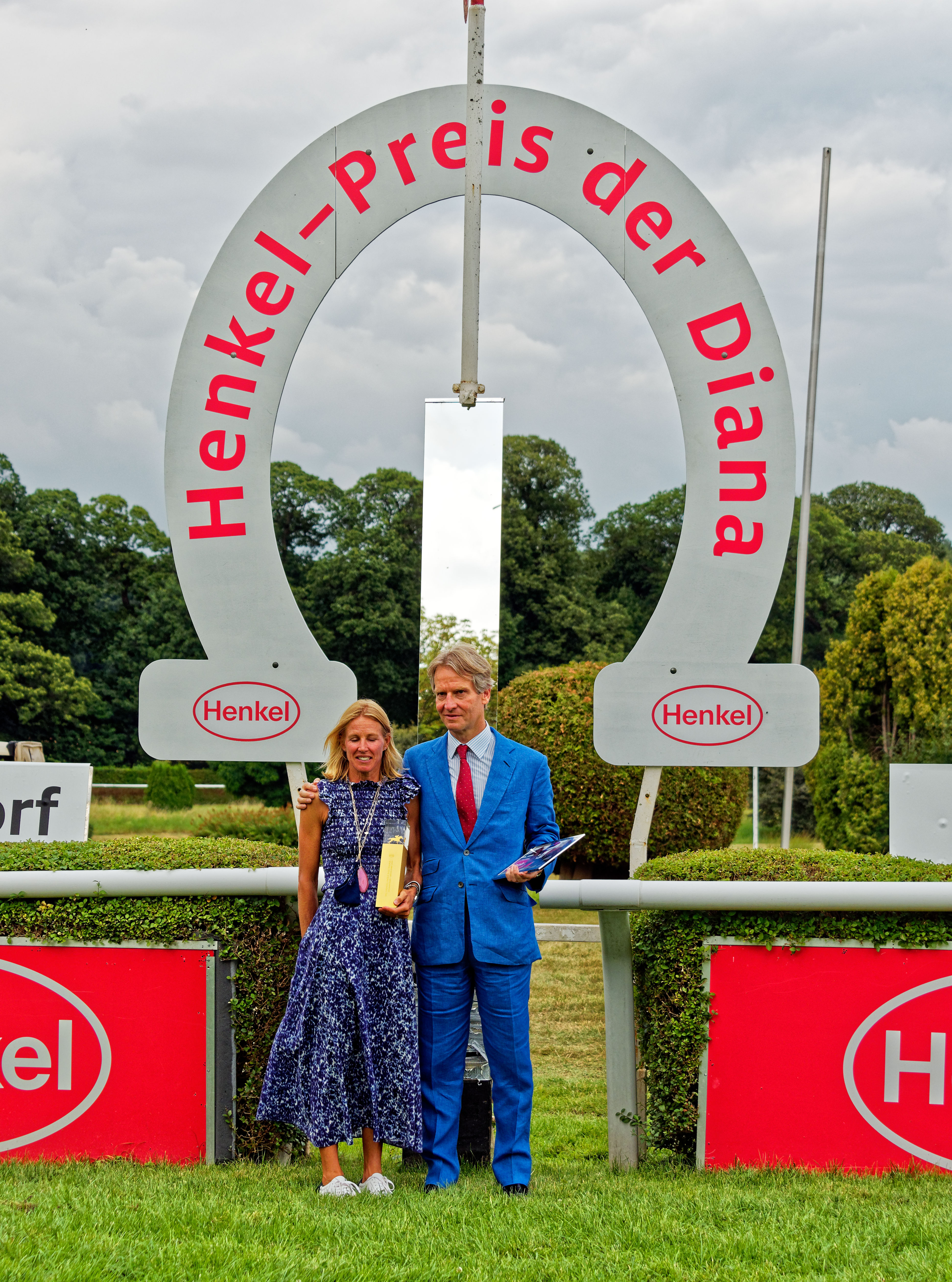
- von Opel and wife Emily in 2020
- Born: Georg von Opel; 4 May 1966 (age 60); Kronberg im Taunus, West Germany
- Citizenship: Switzerland
- Education: University of Rhode Island; American InterContinental University
- Occupation: Investor
- Spouse: Emily Bond
- Children: 5
- Relatives: Adam Opel (great-grandfather)

Georg von Opel (born 4 May 1966) is a German-born Swiss billionaire. He is the great-grandson of Adam Opel, who founded the German car manufacturer Opel AG, and is an heir to the family fortune. As of 2026, Forbes estimates his net worth at $3.4 billion.

== Early life and education ==
Von Opel was born on 4 May 1966 in Kronberg im Taunus, West Germany to Georg Friedrich Karl Adam von Opel, who was the son of Carl von Opel and grandson of Adam Opel, and Ingrid (née Revers; b. 1945).

He studied economics and business administration at the University of Rhode Island and the American InterContinental University, London.

== Career ==
In April 2015, the Sunday Times Rich List estimated his net worth at GBP £1.3 billion. According to the Sunday Times Rich List, this had increased to £1.654 billion in 2020. His wealth primarily comes from Hansa AG, a holding company that invests in listed equities and private-equity funds. von Opel's real estate portfolio includes properties in the south of England, Majorca and the Engadin region in the Swiss Alps.

== Donations ==
He is a major donor to the UK's Conservative Party. Through his foundation, the Georg and Emily von Opel Foundation, he has financially supported Oxford professor Sunetra Gupta who has argued against societal restrictions during the COVID-19 pandemic and was one of the authors of the Great Barrington Declaration.

== Personal life ==
Opel lives in Switzerland. He has five children, thereof four with his British-born wife, the former professional tennis player Emily Bond. While von Opel was born a German citizen, his family had been a resident of Switzerland since 1973. He was naturalized in 2014.
