= Asmena (horse) =

French-bred Thoroughbred racehorse

- Sire: Goya
- Grandsire: Tourbillon
- Dam: Astronomie
- Damsire: Asterus
- Sex: Mare
- Foaled: 1947
- Country: France
- Colour: Chestnut
- Breeder: Marcel Boussac
- Owner: Marcel Boussac
- Trainer: Charles Semblat

Major wins
- Epsom Oaks (1950)

Asmena (1947 – after 1967) was a French Thoroughbred racehorse and broodmare. She is best known for her victory in the 1950 Epsom Oaks when she overcame lameness to record a decisive win over a strong field. After being retired from racing at the end of the year she had some success as a dam of winners.

== Background ==
Asmena was a chestnut mare bred in France by her owner Marcel Boussac. She was sent into training with Charles Semblat at Chantilly.

Her sire Goya won ten races including the Gimcrack Stakes, St. James's Palace Stakes and Prix des Sablons and went on to be a successful breeding stallion in both Europe and North America and was the Leading sire in France in 1947 and 1948. Goya was a representative of the Byerley Turk sire line, unlike more than 95% of modern thoroughbreds, who descend directly from the Darley Arabian. Asmena's dam Astronomie was a good racehorse who won the Prix Chloé and became an exceptional broodmare whose other foals included Marsyas, Caracalla and Arbar.

== Racing career ==
=== 1950: three-year-old season ===
On her three-year-old debut, Asmena finished second, beaten a head by the colt Vieux Manoir in a race over 2500 metres in France. After the Australian jockey Rae Johnstone won the 1000 Guineas on Camarée he announced that he was confident of winning the Epsom Oaks on Asmena. Asmena was introduced into the ante-post betting for the Oaks but was removed from the market shortly afterwards amid suspicions that the British bookmakers were afraid to lay long odds against her.

Asmena was one of five French fillies sent to England to contest the 172nd running of the Oaks over one and a half miles at Epsom Racecourse on 25 May 1950. She arrived at Epsom a few days before the race and galloped over the course but looked badly unsuited by the "rock hard" ground and finished very sore. With Johnstone in the saddle she started the 5/1 second choice in the betting behind Camarée whilst the other fancied runners included Plume, Above Board (later to win the Yorkshire Oaks and Cesarewitch), Happy Haven, Stella Polaris (Cornwallis Stakes, Oak Trial Stakes), Catchit (runner-up in the 1000 Guineas), La Baille (later to win the Yorkshire Oaks and Park Hill Stakes), Sanlinea and Tawhida. Before the race Asmena, who suffered from a rheumatic condition which had been exacerbated by her training gallop, looked to be lame and hobbled her way to the start, causing many observers to dismiss her chances. Once the race began, however, she moved freely, took the lead approaching the final furlong and won by a length from Plume, with Stella Polaris a length and a half away in third place. After the race Johnstone said "Asmena has constant shin soreness. She could hardly stand up, but got into her stride once we started. Two furlongs from home she really got going, and I had it won a furlong out".

In September Asmena finished third behind Kilette and Nuit de Folies in the Prix Vermeille over 2400 metres at Longchamp Racecourse.

== Assessment and honours ==
In their book, A Century of Champions, based on the Timeform rating system, John Randall and Tony Morris rated Asmena an "inferior" winner of the Oaks.

== Breeding record ==
At the end of her racing career Asmena was retired to become a broodmare for the Bousac stud. She produced at least eight foals and two good winners from 1952 till 1967:

- Kurun, a chestnut colt, foaled in 1952, sired by Whirlaway. Won Prix Daru and Jockey Club Stakes.
- Galmena, bay filly, 1953, by Galcador.
- Jaral, bay colt, 1954, by Djebel.
- Auras, bay colt, 1959, by Auriban.
- Ardaban, brown colt, 1961, by Auriban. Won Grand Prix de Marseille.
- Amarga, bay filly, 1964, by Auriban.
- Carapella, chestnut filly, 1965, by Exbury.
- Olympio, colt, 1967, by Ribot.

== Pedigree ==
Pedigree of Asmena (FR), chestnut mare, 1947
Sire Goya (FR) 1934	Tourbillon; 1928	Ksar	Bruleur
Sire Goya (FR) 1934	Tourbillon; 1928	Ksar	Kizil Kourgan
Sire Goya (FR) 1934	Tourbillon; 1928	Durban	Durbar
Sire Goya (FR) 1934	Tourbillon; 1928	Durban	Banshee
Sire Goya (FR) 1934	Zariba; 1919	Sardanapale	Prestige
Sire Goya (FR) 1934	Zariba; 1919	Sardanapale	Gemma (GB)
Sire Goya (FR) 1934	Zariba; 1919	St Lucre (GB)	St Serf
Sire Goya (FR) 1934	Zariba; 1919	St Lucre (GB)	Fairy Gold
Dam Astronomie (FR) 1932	Asterus; 1923	Teddy	Ajax
Dam Astronomie (FR) 1932	Asterus; 1923	Teddy	Rondeau (GB)
Dam Astronomie (FR) 1932	Asterus; 1923	Astrella	Verdun
Dam Astronomie (FR) 1932	Asterus; 1923	Astrella	Saint Astra
Dam Astronomie (FR) 1932	Likka; 1925	Sardanapale	Prestige
Dam Astronomie (FR) 1932	Likka; 1925	Sardanapale	Gemma (GB)
Dam Astronomie (FR) 1932	Likka; 1925	Diane Mallory	Nimbus
Dam Astronomie (FR) 1932	Likka; 1925	Diane Mallory	Ferula (GB)(Family: 9-e)

- Asmena was inbred 3 × 3 to Sardanapale, meaning that this stallion appears twice in the third generation of her pedigree.
