= Arbar (horse) =

French-bred Thoroughbred racehorse

- Sire: Djebel
- Grandsire: Tourbillon
- Dam: Astronomie
- Damsire: Asterus
- Sex: Stallion
- Foaled: 1944
- Country: France
- Colour: Bay
- Breeder: Marcel Boussac
- Owner: Marcel Boussac
- Trainer: Charles Semblat
- Record: 9: 7-2-0

Major wins
- King George VI Stakes (1947); Prix Jean Prat (1948); Prix du Cadran (1948); Ascot Gold Cup (1948)

Awards
- Timeform top-rated horse (1948); Timeform rating 135

Arbar (1944 – after 1959) was a French racehorse and sire. A horse with a strong, stamina-rich pedigree he was unraced as a two-year-old but proved himself one of the best European three-year-olds of 1947, despite a narrow defeat in the St Leger Stakes. In the following season he established himself as the best stayer in Europe with wins in the Prix du Cadran in France and the Ascot Gold Cup in Britain. He was injured at Goodwood in July and was retired to stud, where he had some success as a sire of winners.

== Background ==
Arbar was a bay horse with an "Arab-like" head white star, bred by his owner Marcel Boussac at his Haras de Fresnay-le-Buffard in Neuvy-au-Houlme in Lower Normandy.

Arbar's dam was the highly successful broodmare Astronomie, whose other progeny included Marsyas, the undefeated Caracalla, and The Oaks winner Asmena. Arbar's sire Djebel, also bred and raced by Boussac, won the 2000 Guineas in 1941 and the Prix de l'Arc de Triomphe two years later. He went on to become Leading sire in France on four occasions, and sired many important winners including My Babu, Galcador and Coronation. Djebel's success as a breeding stallion was largely responsible for the survival of the Byerley Turk sire line. Because of the presence of certain American bloodlines in the pedigree of his sire Tourbillon, Djebel was considered "half-bred" (non-Thoroughbred) by the General Stud Book until 1949.

Arbar raced in the Boussac colours of "orange jacket, grey cap" and was trained at Chantilly by the former jockey Charles Semblat.

== Racing career ==
=== 1947: three-year-old season ===
Arbar was unraced as a two-year-old and began his racing career in 1947. He won three races in succession in France and in September he was sent to England to contest the St Leger over one and three quarter miles at Doncaster Racecourse. In a field of eleven runners he was ridden by Charlie Elliott and started at odds of 5/1. He finished second, a head behind Sayajirao and three lengths clear of the future Arc de Triomphe winner Migoli. A month later he returned to Britain and won the King George VI Stakes over two miles at Ascot Racecourse, beating only three opponents for one of the most valuable races of the British season.

=== 1948: four-year-old season ===
In May 1948, Arbar won the Prix Jean Prat over 3,000 metres at Longchamp Racecourse. Later that month defeated the Belgian champion Bayeux in the 4,000 metre Prix du Cadran at the same venue. In winning the race, which is regarded as the French counterpart of the Ascot Gold Cup, he went some way to emulating the achievements of his half-brother Marsyas, who won the race on four occasions.

On 17 June Arbar was made the 4/6 favourite for the two and a half mile Gold Cup at Royal Ascot, a race which had been won by his older half-brother Caracalla in 1946. Ridden by Elliott he produced a "spectacular late sweep" to take the lead in the straight and pulled clear to win easily by four lengths from Bayeux and Roi de Navarre. His victory earned £11,375 for Marcel Boussac and highlighted the superiority of late-maturing French stayers over their British rivals. Following the race, Arbar was hailed as "the best stayer in Europe... if not the world". At Goodwood Racecourse on 29 July he started 1/3 favourite for the Goodwood Cup over two miles five furlongs in which he was matched against Federico Tesio's Italian champion Tenerani. The race was run in unusually hot weather and Arbar looked uncomfortable in the paddock before the race. Five furlongs from the finish he sustained an injury ("broke down") and was beaten one and a half lengths by Tenerani, who appeared to have hampered the runner-up by swerving in the straight. Arbar's injury proved so serious that he was retired from racing.

== Assessment ==
The independent Timeform organisation assigned a rating of 135 to both Arbar and Tenerani in 1948, making them the highest-rated horses of the season in Europe.

In their book A Century of Champions, based on a modified version of the Timeform system, John Randall and Tony Morris rated Arbar the thirty-fifth best French-trained horse of the 20th century and the second-best horse foaled in 1944, ahead of Tenerani but behind Tudor Minstrel.

== Stud record ==
Arbar was retired to stand as a breeding stallion at his owner's Normandy stud. He was not particularly successful, but was a better sire than either Marsyas or Caracalla. The best of his offspring was the Grand Critérium winner Abdos, Timeform's top-rated two-year-old colt of 1961. Another of his sons, Arcor, won the Prix du Conseil de Paris and finished second in The Derby.

== Sire line tree ==
- Arbar
  - Abdos
    - Abgal
    - Adam Van Vianen
  - Arcor

== Pedigree ==
Pedigree of Arbar (FR), bay stallion 1944
Sire Djebel	Tourbillon (FR)	Ksar	Bruleur
Sire Djebel	Tourbillon (FR)	Ksar	Kizil Kourgan
Sire Djebel	Tourbillon (FR)	Durban	Durbar
Sire Djebel	Tourbillon (FR)	Durban	Banshee
Sire Djebel	Loika (FR)	Gay Crusader	Bayardo
Sire Djebel	Loika (FR)	Gay Crusader	Gay Laura
Sire Djebel	Loika (FR)	Coeur a Coeur	Teddy*
Sire Djebel	Loika (FR)	Coeur a Coeur	Ballantrae
Dam Astronomie (FR)	Asterus (FR)	Teddy*	Ajax
Dam Astronomie (FR)	Asterus (FR)	Teddy*	Rondeau
Dam Astronomie (FR)	Asterus (FR)	Astrella	Verdun
Dam Astronomie (FR)	Asterus (FR)	Astrella	Saint Astra
Dam Astronomie (FR)	Likka (FR)	Sardanapale	Prestige
Dam Astronomie (FR)	Likka (FR)	Sardanapale	Gemma
Dam Astronomie (FR)	Likka (FR)	Diane Mallory	Nimbus
Dam Astronomie (FR)	Likka (FR)	Diane Mallory	Ferula (Family: 9-e)

* Arbar is inbred 4S x 3D to the stallion Teddy, meaning that he appears fourth generation on the sire side of his pedigree and third generation on the dam side of his pedigree.
