= Coronation (French horse) =

French-bred Thoroughbred racehorse

- Sire: Djebel
- Grandsire: Tourbillon
- Dam: Esmeralda
- Damsire: Tourbillon
- Sex: Mare
- Foaled: 1946
- Country: France
- Colour: Bay
- Breeder: Marcel Boussac
- Owner: Marcel Boussac
- Trainer: Charles Semblat
- Record: 13: 6-4-1

Major wins
- Queen Mary Stakes (1948); Prix Robert Papin (1948); Poule d'Essai des Pouliches (1949); Prix de l'Arc de Triomphe (1949)

Awards
- Timeform top-rated three-year-old filly (1949); Timeform rating 135

Coronation (also known as Coronation V, foaled 1946) was a French racehorse. In a racing career which lasted from the spring of 1948 until October 1950, she ran thirteen times and won six races. As a two-year-old she was one of the best fillies of her generation in Europe, winning the Queen Mary Stakes in England and the Prix Robert Papin in France. In the following year she dead-heated for the Poule d'Essai des Pouliches, but was beaten in both the Oaks Stakes and the Irish Oaks. In October 1949 she established her reputation as one of the best fillies to race in Europe in the 20th century when she emphatically defeated a strong international field in the Prix de l'Arc de Triomphe. Her subsequent racing career was disappointing and she was a complete failure as a broodmare.

== Background ==
Coronation was a bay mare with a white blaze and a white sock on her right hind leg, bred by her owner Marcel Boussac at his Haras de Fresnay-le-Buffard in Neuvy-au-Houlme in Lower Normandy. Coronation raced in the Boussac colours of "orange jacket, grey cap" and was trained at Chantilly by the former jockey Charles Semblat.

Coronation's sire Djebel, also bred and raced by Boussac, won the 2000 Guineas in 1941 and the Prix de l'Arc de Triomphe two years later. He went on to become Leading sire in France on four occasions, and sired many important winners including My Babu, Galcador and Arbar. Djebel's success as a breeding stallion was largely responsible for the survival of the Byerley Turk sire line. Because of the presence of certain American bloodlines in the pedigree of his sire Tourbillon, Djebel was considered "half-bred" (non-Thoroughbred) by the General Stud Book until 1949. Coronation was closely inbred to Tourbillon, as the stallion was also the sire of her dam, Esmeralda. Coronation was the first foal of Esmeralda, a top-class racehorse who won the Prix Morny and the Poule d'Essai des Pouliches.

== Racing career ==
=== 1948: two-year-old season ===
After winning her first race in France, Coronation was sent to England in June to contest the Queen Mary Stakes over five furlongs at Royal Ascot. As the name Coronation had been used before in Britain, most notably by the 1840 Epsom Derby winner, the filly was known as Coronation V when racing in that country. She was ridden by Charlie Elliott and won at odds of 7/2. On her return to France she was matched against colts and won the Prix Robert Papin over 1,200 metres at Maisons-Laffitte Racecourse. In August she started favourite for the Prix Morny at Deauville Racecourse but finished third behind the colt Amour Drake and the filly Musette.

=== 1949: three-year-old season ===
In May 1949, Coronation ran in the Poule d'Essai des Pouliches over 1,600 metres at Longchamp Racecourse and ran a dead heat with Galgala, another filly owned by Boussac and trained by Semblat.

In summer, Coronation was moved up in distance when she contested the Oaks Stakes over one and a half miles at Epsom Downs Racecourse where she started 6/1 third favourite. Elliott sent Coronation into the lead from the start and she maintained her advantage until challenged by the favourite Musidora in the straight. After what was described as a "magnificent" finish, the French filly finished second, beaten a neck. Coronation was expected to win the Irish Oaks at the Curragh a month later, but failed to reproduce her best form and was beaten four lengths by Circus Lady. Boussac and Semblat then decided to rest the filly and she did not race again until October.

In 1949 the prize money for the Prix de l'Arc de Triomphe was boosted from 5.2 million francs to almost 29 million francs, and the race at Longchamp in October attracted a strong international field of 28 runners. In front of an estimated 150,000 spectators, Coronation was ridden by Roger Poincelet and started at odds of 3.7/1 as part of the Boussac entry. She was restrained by Poincelet in the early stages before taking the lead 300 metres from the finish. She drew clear of the field in the closing stages and won impressively by four lengths from Rita Hayworth's filly Double Rose, with Amour Drake in third.

=== 1950: four-year-old season ===
Coronation stayed in training at four but failed to win. She began promisingly by finishing second to her stable companion Djeddah in the Prix d'Hédouville in May. In October, she attempted to win a second Arc, but finished unplaced behind Tantieme.

== Assessment ==
The independent Timeform organisation assigned a rating of 135 to Coronation in 1949, making her the highest-rated three-year-old filly in Europe. Since 1949 the only three-year-old filly to surpass Coronation's mark has been the sprinter Habibti, who was rated 136 in 1983.

In their book A Century of Champions, based on a modified version of the Timeform system, John Randall and Tony Morris rated Caracalla the third best French-trained filly or mare of the 20th century, behind Allez France and Dahlia and the second-best horse foaled in 1946, behind Abernant.

== Stud record ==
Coronation's stud career was a complete failure as, despite being sent to leading sires including Pharis and Iron Liege, she proved unable to conceive. This infertility was attributed by some breeding experts to the close inbreeding in her pedigree.

== Pedigree ==
Pedigree of Coronation (FR), bay mare, 1946
Sire Djebel	Tourbillon (FR)	Ksar	Bruleur
Sire Djebel	Tourbillon (FR)	Ksar	Kizil Kourgan
Sire Djebel	Tourbillon (FR)	Durban	Durbar
Sire Djebel	Tourbillon (FR)	Durban	Banshee
Sire Djebel	Loika (FR)	Gay Crusader	Bayardo
Sire Djebel	Loika (FR)	Gay Crusader	Gay Laura
Sire Djebel	Loika (FR)	Coeur a Coeur	Teddy
Sire Djebel	Loika (FR)	Coeur a Coeur	Ballantrae
Dam Esmeralda (FR)	Tourbillon (FR)	Ksar	Bruleur
Dam Esmeralda (FR)	Tourbillon (FR)	Ksar	Kizil Kourgan
Dam Esmeralda (FR)	Tourbillon (FR)	Durban	Durbar
Dam Esmeralda (FR)	Tourbillon (FR)	Durban	Banshee
Dam Esmeralda (FR)	Sanaa (FR)	Asterus	Teddy
Dam Esmeralda (FR)	Sanaa (FR)	Asterus	Astrella
Dam Esmeralda (FR)	Sanaa (FR)	Deasy	Alcantara
Dam Esmeralda (FR)	Sanaa (FR)	Deasy	Diana Vernon (Family: 14)

Coronation was inbred 2x2 to Tourbillon. This means that the stallion appears twice in the second generation of her pedigree.
