= Caracalla (horse) =

French-bred Thoroughbred racehorse

- Sire: Tourbillon
- Grandsire: Ksar
- Dam: Astronomie
- Damsire: Asterus
- Sex: Stallion
- Foaled: 1942
- Country: France
- Colour: Bay
- Breeder: Marcel Boussac
- Owner: Marcel Boussac
- Trainer: Charles Semblat
- Record: 8: 8-0-0

Major wins
- Grand Prix de Paris (1945); Prix Royal Oak (1945); Ascot Gold Cup (1946); Prix de l'Arc de Triomphe (1946)

Caracalla (also known as Caracalla II; 1942 – after 1955) was a French racehorse and sire. Unraced as a two-year-old and never competing at a distance shorter than 2,400 metres, he was undefeated in eight races in a racing career which lasted from the spring of 1945 until October 1946. Caracalla excelled over extended distances, winning the Grand Prix de Paris and the Prix Royal Oak in France and the Ascot Gold Cup in Britain. On his final appearance he proved himself capable of beating top class opposition at middle distances when he won the Prix de l'Arc de Triomphe. He was then retired to stud, where his record was disappointing.

== Background ==
Named after the Roman emperor of the same name, Caracalla was an exceptionally good-looking bay horse with a narrow white blaze and white socks on his hind legs, bred by his owner Marcel Boussac at his Haras de Fresnay-le-Buffard in Neuvy-au-Houlme in Lower Normandy.

Caracalla's dam was the highly successful broodmare Astronomie, whose other progeny included Marsyas, Arbar, and Asmena. Caracalla's sire Tourbillon, also bred and raced by Boussac, won the Prix du Jockey Club in 1931 and became Leading sire in France on three occasions. Tourbillon's success as a breeding stallion was largely responsible for the survival of the Byerley Turk sire line. Because of the presence of certain American bloodlines in Tourbillon's pedigree, his offspring were considered "half-bred" (non-Thoroughbred) by the General Stud Book.

Caracalla raced in the Boussac colours of "orange, grey cap" and was trained by the former jockey Charles Semblat. According to Phil Bull, the colt demonstrated a high knee action, a low head carriage, and "an exceptionally long and powerful stride".

== Racing career ==
=== 1945: three-year-old season ===
Caracalla did not race as a two-year-old and began his racing career in the spring of 1945 with wins in the Prix Bay Middleton and the Prix Reiset. On 9 July he contested France's most valuable and prestigious race for three-year-olds, the Grand Prix de Paris over 3000 metres at the recently re-opened Longchamp Racecourse. Caracalla started the 16/10 favourite and won by one and a half lengths from Chanteur.

The colt did not appear again on the racecourse until the autumn. He would have been a leading contender for the Prix de l'Arc de Triomphe over 2,400 metres, but Boussac preferred to rely on the 1944 winner Ardan, who finished second to Nikellora, with Chanteur beaten less than a length in third. Caracalla was instead aimed at the Prix Royal Oak at the same course over 3000 metres. He completed an unbeaten season by winning from Basileus and Chanteur.

=== 1946: four-year-old season ===
In early 1946, Caracalla took his winning run to six by taking the Prix Edgard Gillois and the Prix de Dangu. On his first and only appearance outside France, Caracalla was part of an exceptionally strong team of French stayers sent to Royal Ascot in June. Ridden by the French-based English jockey Charlie Elliott, he was made 4/9 favourite in a field of seven runners for the meeting's premier event, the Ascot Gold Cup over two and a half miles. He won by two lengths from Chanteur, with Basileus completing a clean sweep of the places for France by finishing third. At the same meeting, Caracalla's older brother Marsyas won the Queen Alexandra Stakes. Caracalla did not appear again until October, when he was allowed to take his chance in the Prix de l'Arc de Triomphe and was made the 3/10 favourite against eight opponents. Racing over a distance short of his best, he was outpaced in the early stages but finished strongly to catch Prince Chevalier in the final strides and won by a head.

== Assessment ==
In their book A Century of Champions, based on a modified version of the Timeform system, John Randall and Tony Morris rated Caracalla the seventeenth best French-trained horse of the 20th century, the best horse foaled in 1942, and the best horse in the world in 1946.

== Stud record ==
Caracalla was retired to become a breeding stallion at his owner's stud in Normandy. He was not considered a success, with the best of his progeny being the fillies Caralina (Prix de Pomone) and Caraida (Prix Fille de l'Air). He was also the damsire of Wolver Hollow who won the Eclipse Stakes and sired Wollow. Caracalla was eventually sold and exported to New Zealand.

== Pedigree ==
Pedigree of Caracalla (FR), bay stallion 1942
Sire Tourbillon (FR)	Ksar (FR)	Bruleur	Chouberski
Sire Tourbillon (FR)	Ksar (FR)	Bruleur	Basse Terre
Sire Tourbillon (FR)	Ksar (FR)	Kizil Kourgan	Omnium
Sire Tourbillon (FR)	Ksar (FR)	Kizil Kourgan	Kasbah
Sire Tourbillon (FR)	Durban (FR)	Durbar	Rabelais
Sire Tourbillon (FR)	Durban (FR)	Durbar	Armenia
Sire Tourbillon (FR)	Durban (FR)	Banshee	Irish Lad
Sire Tourbillon (FR)	Durban (FR)	Banshee	Frizette
Dam Astronomie (FR)	Asterus (FR)	Teddy	Ajax
Dam Astronomie (FR)	Asterus (FR)	Teddy	Rondeau
Dam Astronomie (FR)	Asterus (FR)	Astrella	Verdun
Dam Astronomie (FR)	Asterus (FR)	Astrella	Saint Astra
Dam Astronomie (FR)	Likka (FR)	Sardanapale	Prestige
Dam Astronomie (FR)	Likka (FR)	Sardanapale	Gemma
Dam Astronomie (FR)	Likka (FR)	Diane Mallory	Nimbus
Dam Astronomie (FR)	Likka (FR)	Diane Mallory	Ferula (Family: 9-e)

== See also ==
- List of leading Thoroughbred racehorses
