= My Babu =

French-bred Thoroughbred racehorse

- Sire: Djebel
- Grandsire: Tourbillon
- Dam: Perfume II
- Damsire: Badruddin
- Sex: Stallion
- Foaled: 1945
- Country: France
- Colour: Bay
- Breeder: Peter Beatty
- Owner: HH Maharaja of Baroda
- Trainer: Sam Armstrong
- Record: 16: 11-2-0
- Earnings: £29,830

Major wins
- Champagne Stakes (1947); New Stakes (1947); Woodcote Stakes (1947); Craven Stakes (1948); Sussex Stakes (1948); Victoria Cup Handicap Stakes (1949) British Classic Race wins: 2000 Guineas Stakes (1948)

Awards
- Timeform top-rated two-year-old colt (1947)
- Last updated on January 23, 2010

My Babu (1945–1970) was a French-bred Thoroughbred racehorse who became one of the most influential sires in American breeding of show jumpers, eventers and hunters. His descendants include Bruce Davidson's former eventing mount JJ Babu, Anky van Grunsven's dressage horse Bonfire, and puissance and grand prix jumper Sympatico. Also, the grand prix jumper Napur is related to him through his sire Damascus dam Kerala. My Babu was the sire of Kerala, and therefore one of Napur's grandsires.

== Racing career ==
During My Babu's racing career in England, the bay colt had 16 starts, 11 wins, 2 places, and 0 shows, with career earnings of £29,830. His most important win came in the 1948 Classic, the 2000 Guineas Stakes in which he set a new stakes record time. He was later sold in 1955 to Americans Leslie W. Combs II and John W. Hanes for over $600,000, the highest price ever paid for a Thoroughbred imported to the United States. The stallion stood at Spendthrift Farm in Kentucky during his breeding career.

== Stud record ==
My Babu was a sire of 47 stakes winners and was a broodmare sire of 95 winners. He earned the title of Leading Juvenile Sire in 1960. His son, Better Boy, was the Leading sire in Australia four times. By 1965, his racing descendants had won over $3,000,000. My Babu was the grandsire of National Museum of Racing and Hall of Fame inductee Precisionist, and the damsire of Hall of Fame inductees Damascus and Gamely as well as the damsire of Little Current, the 1974 American Champion Three-Year-old Colt and winner of the Preakness and Belmont Stakes.

== Sire line tree ==
- My Babu
  - Better Boy
    - Craftsman
    - Tolerance
    - Century
      - Double Century
        - Burglar of Bamff
        - Bigamy
        - Stylish Century
        - Dual Scope
      - Centaine
        - Cordero
        - Kinjite
        - Super Fit
        - Perfect World
        - Cheiron
        - Taupo Retreat
        - Century Kid
      - Rubiton
        - Monopolize
        - Flavour
        - Adam
        - Fields of Omagh
        - Patezza
        - Bulleton
        - Lucky Secret
      - Average Game
        - Chevoit
        - Tampir Lane
      - Centro
      - Euclase
    - Reckless
  - Eubulides
  - Our Babu
    - Dowdstown Charley
      - Prince Florimund
  - Babur
  - Dionisio
    - Saint Denys
      - Billycan
      - Bregawn
  - Milesian
    - Atlantis
    - Mystery
    - Ionian
      - Rocked
    - Partholon
      - Mejiro Asama
        - Mejiro Titan
          - Mejiro McQueen
      - Sakura Shori
        - Sakura Star O
      - Symboli Rudolf
        - Tokai Teio
        - Ayrton Symboli
        - Tsurumaru Tsuyoshi
    - Western Wind
    - Falcon
      - Drobny
  - King Babar
  - Primera
  - Shearwater
  - The Hammer
    - Sympatico
    - Tong
  - Babu
  - Babu Dancer
    - JJ Babu
  - Bronze Babu
  - Crozier
    - Inverness Drive
      - Bad'n Big
    - Wedge Shot
    - Beat Inflation
    - Crested Wave
      - Drought
      - Gennaker
      - Surfers Paradise
      - Surface
    - Sportful
    - Journey At Sea
    - Precisionist
  - Garwol
  - Prudent
    - Manitoba
    - Mazarin
  - Babu's On
    - Santanas

== Pedigree ==
Pedigree of My Babu
Sire Djebel b. 1937	Tourbillon b. 1928	Ksar ch. 1918	Bruleur
Sire Djebel b. 1937	Tourbillon b. 1928	Ksar ch. 1918	Kizil Kourgan
Sire Djebel b. 1937	Tourbillon b. 1928	Durban b. 1918	Durbar
Sire Djebel b. 1937	Tourbillon b. 1928	Durban b. 1918	Banshee
Sire Djebel b. 1937	Loika ch. 1926	Gay Crusader b. 1914	Bayardo
Sire Djebel b. 1937	Loika ch. 1926	Gay Crusader b. 1914	Gay Laura
Sire Djebel b. 1937	Loika ch. 1926	Coeur A Coeur ch. 1921	Teddy
Sire Djebel b. 1937	Loika ch. 1926	Coeur A Coeur ch. 1921	Ballantrae
Dam Perfume gr. 1938	Badruddin gr. 1931	Blandford br. 1919	Swynford*
Dam Perfume gr. 1938	Badruddin gr. 1931	Blandford br. 1919	Blanche
Dam Perfume gr. 1938	Badruddin gr. 1931	Mumtaz Mahal gr. 1921	The Tetrarch
Dam Perfume gr. 1938	Badruddin gr. 1931	Mumtaz Mahal gr. 1921	Lady Josephine
Dam Perfume gr. 1938	Lavendula br. 1930	Pharos br. 1920	Phalaris
Dam Perfume gr. 1938	Lavendula br. 1930	Pharos br. 1920	Scapa Flow
Dam Perfume gr. 1938	Lavendula br. 1930	Sweet Lavender ch. 1923	Swynford*
Dam Perfume gr. 1938	Lavendula br. 1930	Sweet Lavender ch. 1923	Marchetta (Family 1-w)

* My Babu is inbred 4D x 4D to the stallion Swynford, meaning that he appears fourth generation twice on the dam side of his pedigree.
