= Djebel =

French-bred Thoroughbred racehorse

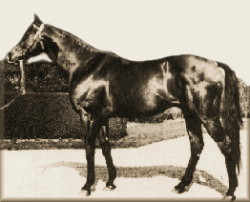
- Sire: Tourbillon
- Grandsire: Ksar
- Dam: Loika
- Damsire: Gay Crusader
- Sex: Stallion
- Foaled: 1937
- Country: France
- Colour: Bay
- Breeder: Marcel Boussac
- Owner: Marcel Boussac. Racing colours: Orange, grey cap.
- Trainer: Albert Swann (Percy Carter) Charles Semblat
- Record: 22: 15-3-3
- Earnings: ₣3,253,760 & £6,115

Major wins
- Middle Park Stakes (1939); Prix Lagrange (1940); Prix d'Essai (1940); 2,000 Guineas (1940); Prix Boiard (1941 & 1942); Prix d'Harcourt (1941 & 1942); Prix d'Hédouville (1941 & 1942); Prix des Sablons (1942); Grand Prix de Saint-Cloud (1942); Prix de l'Arc de Triomphe (1942)

Awards
- French Champion Two-Year-Old (1939); Leading sire in France (1947; 1948; 1949; and 1956)

Honours
- Prix Djebel at Maisons-Laffitte
- Last updated on 12 June 2017

For mountains or other uses, see: Jabal.

Djebel (1937–1958) was a French Thoroughbred racehorse, who won 15 of 22 races during 1939–1942 including the Prix d'Essai, 2000 Guineas and Prix de l'Arc de Triomphe. He was later a leading sire in France and is responsible for the survival of the Byerley Turk sire line into the 21st century.

== Breeding ==
Djebel was a bay stallion owned and bred by renowned horseman Marcel Boussac. He was sired by Tourbillon, who had won the French Derby and the Prix Lupin, and went on to become a notable sire. Djebel's dam, Loika, was a minor winner by Gay Crusader and out of Coeur a Coeur. Gay Crusader was the 1917 U.K. Triple Crown winner, and by the influential Bayardo. Coeur a Coeur was by Teddy, whose grandsire was the 1899 English Triple Crown champion Flying Fox. Therefore, Djebel traced back to Bay Ronald twice through his dam (both Bayardo and Teddy's dam-sire were by Bay Ronald).

Loika was originally not a success as a broodmare, producing just one foal, a minor winner, in her first five years. In 1936, she was bred to Tourbillion and Boussac offered her in foal at the Newmarket December Sales. She did not meet her reserve so she returned home to Haras de Fresnay-le-Buffard, where she delivered Djebel in January 1937. Loika went on to produce several other winners including Hierocles, two-time winner of the Prix d'Ispahan.

== Racing career ==
In his 22 starts, Djebel won 15, placed second in three, and finished third in one. His wins included the 1942 Prix de l'Arc de Triomphe, the 2,000 Guineas Stakes (GB), Prix des Sablons, Prix Boiard (twice), Prix d'Harcourt (twice), Prix d'Hédouville (twice), Grand Prix de Saint-Cloud, Prix d'Essai, Prix Lagrange and Middle Park Stakes. He finished second in the Prix Morny, Grand Prix de St. Cloud, and Prix de Chantilly, and third in the 1941 Prix de l'Arc de Triomphe.

Djebel was originally trained by Albert Swann at Chantilly. He started five times in 1939 at age two. In his debut at Chantilly, he finished second to the odds-on Lighthouse. He then won the Prix de Chatou at Longchamp by three lengths before finishing second to Lighthouse in the Prix d'Aumale and second to eventual champion filly Furane in the Prix Morny, with Lighthouse back in fourth. At this point, World War II broke out, stopping all racing in France. Djebel was shipped to England in November for the Middle Park Stakes, held later than usual that year on Newmarket's July Course. Djebel won easily by two lengths over the eventual English champion two-year-old Tant Mieux. Djebel was named the Champion two-year-old colt in France.

Djebel's three-year-old campaign of 1940 was interrupted due to the turbulence of the war. In March at Longchamp, he won his first start of the year, then followed up with a win on May 1 in the 2000 Guineas. He would have been the favorite for the Derby in June but was unable to travel due to the escalating war in France. He did not race again until late October when he won the Prix d'Essai, a substitute event that year for both the French 1000 and 2000 Guineas. He finished the year with a disappointing third-place finish in a replacement for the Prix du Jockey-Club, staged that year at Auteuil.

Djebel began 1941 with three wins then finished second to Maurepas in both the Grand Prix de Saint-Cloud and the Prix de Chantilly. He was the favorite for the Prix de l'Arc de Triomphe but finished third behind the then-unbeaten champion three-year-old Le Pacha.

For his five-year-old campaign in 1942, Djebel was trained by former jockey Charles Semblat, who stepped up the horse's training regimen. Djebel responded with a perfect season of seven wins, all at Longchamp. His wins included the Prix des Sablons and Prix Boïard in April, the Prix d'Harcourt in May, the Prix d'Hédouville in June and the Grand Prix de Saint-Cloud in July. In the latter, he ended Le Pacha's unbeaten streak. Djebel was given a short rest before returning in September to win the Prix de Chantilly. He then finished his career by winning the Prix de l'Arc de Triomphe where he again beat Le Pacha.

== Stud record ==
Djebel was retired to stud in 1943 and initially received limited support due to the war. At first, his international appeal was also limited by the fact that he and his progeny could not be included in the General Stud Book (GSB) under the terms of the Jersey Act. The Jersey Act prohibited horses with American blood from being registered as Thoroughbreds in England, and Djebel's sire Tourbillon had three American ancestors in the third generation of his pedigree. Thus Djebel and his get were originally considered half-bred horses in England. In part due to their success, the Jersey Act was amended in 1949 to allow their inclusion in the GSB.

Djebel sired 36 stakes-winners which won 53 stakes-races. In France, he was the leading sire for four years (1947, 1948, 1949, and 1956), second in 1950, and in the top ten in 1952–54. In the twelve-year period from 1946 and 1958, his sons and daughters won 318 races, all together worth FF342,736,777.

His progeny included:

Foaled	Name	Sex	Major Wins/Achievements
1944	Arbar	Stallion	Ascot Gold Cup
1944	Clarion	Stallion	Primary continuation of the Byerley Turk sire line (4 known lines exist)
1944	Le Lavandou	Stallion	
1944	Montenica	Mare	Prix de Diane
1945	Djebe	Stallion	
1945	Djeddah	Stallion	Damsire of Never Bend
1945	My Babu	Stallion	Champagne Stakes, Woodcote Stakes, 2000 Guineas Stakes, Secondary continuation of the Byerley Turk sire line (2 known lines exist)
1946	Coronation	Mare	Queen Mary Stakes, Prix Robert Papin, Poule d'Essai des Pouliches, Prix de l'Arc de Triomphe
1947	Galcador	Stallion	Epsom Derby
1948	Djelfa	Mare	Poule d'Essai des Pouliches
1948	Djebellica	Mare	Irish Oaks
1952	Hugh Lupus	Stallion	Irish 2,000 Guineas
1953	Apollina	Mare	Prix de Diane, Poule d'Essai des Pouliches

He had at least 35 sons at stud around the world, including Argentina, Brazil, France, Great Britain and Japan, plus sires, Emperor and Targui in Australia and New Zealand respectively.

Djebel is responsible for the continuation of the Byerley Turk sire line into the 21st century. Through Clairon, his line includes notable winners such as Sagace, Dr Devious, Don't Forget Me, Indian Ridge, Domedriver, Notnowcato and Dunaden. Multiple Group 1 winner Cirrus des Aigles is another descendant through My Babu.

Djebel was also fairly influential in the breeding of sport horses. My Babu's progeny include the eventer JJ Babu. Djebel is also seen in the pedigree of dressage horse Bolero. Also, the grand prix jumper Napur is related to him through his sire Damascus dam Kerala. My Babu was the sire of Kerala, and therefore one of Napur's grandsires.

In July 1958 Djebel died at Haras de Fresnay-le-Buffard at the age of 21.

== Sire line tree ==
Djebel descendants (click to expand)
- Djebel
  - Arbar
    - Abdos
      - Abgal
      - Adam Van Vianen
    - Arcor
  - Clarion
    - Klairon
      - Blanc Bleu
      - Karol
      - Snark
      - Desert Call
        - Uleanto
      - Caldarello
      - Premier Violon
      - D'Urberville
      - Lorenzaccio
        - My Klaire Berry
        - Ahonoora
        - Rolle
        - Zaccio
        - Brewery Boy
      - Luthier
        - Ashmore
        - Riverton
        - Blue Vermillion
        - Condorcet
        - Dandy Lute
        - Tip Moss
        - Twig Moss
        - Guadanini
        - Montcontour
        - Over The River
        - Galiani
        - Tahitian King
        - No Lute
        - Galant Vert
        - Sagace
        - Saint Cyrien
        - Yawa
        - Idealiste
        - King Luthier
      - Disguise
      - Klairvimy
      - Rose Laurel
      - Common Land
        - Almanac
        - Perfect Timing
      - Shangamuzo
      - Beaudelaire
    - Rumesnil
      - Rumpelstiltskin
    - Pantene
    - Net
    - Le Francais
  - Djelal
  - Le Lavandou
    - Le Levanstell
      - Levmoss
        - Moss Trooper
        - Nuthatch
        - Shantallah
        - Shafaraz
        - M-Lolshan
        - Curioso
      - Sans-Fin
      - Allangrange
      - My Swallow
        - Northern Spring
        - Lucky Cast
        - Waka Tenzan
      - Barclay Joe
      - Chacal
        - Number One
        - Brezo
        - Richal
      - Art Style
      - Le Michel
      - Mart Lane
      - Le Moss
        - Scotton Banks
  - Le Roitelet
  - Damnos
  - Dernah
  - Djebe
    - Blast
      - Black Sky
        - Bolero
    - Joy
  - Djebelilla
    - Dyur
  - Djeddah
    - Midsummer Night
      - Quy
        - Tinto De Toro
      - Jimmy Reppin
        - Beldale Rep
        - The Tinker
        - Joy For Jim
        - Ragtime
        - Rutger Royal
      - Alverton
  - Djefou
    - Rapace
      - Rapanni
        - Mr Pompous
    - Le Sanglier
    - Puissant Chef
    - Courroux
  - My Babu
    - Better Boy
      - Craftsman
      - Tolerance
      - Century
        - Double Century
        - Centaine
        - Rubiton
        - Average Game
        - Centro
        - Euclase
      - Reckless
    - Eubulides
    - Our Babu
      - Dowdstown Charley
        - Prince Florimund
    - Babur
    - Dionisio
      - Saint Denys
        - Billycan
        - Bregawn
    - Milesian
      - Atlantis
      - Mystery
      - Ionian
        - Rocked
      - Partholon
        - Mejiro Asama
        - Sakura Shori
        - Symboli Rudolf
      - Western Wind
      - Falcon
        - Drobny
    - King Babar
    - Primera
    - Shearwater
    - The Hammer
      - Sympatico
      - Tong
    - Babu
    - Babu Dancer
      - JJ Babu
    - Bronze Babu
    - Crozier
      - Inverness Drive
        - Bad'n Big
      - Wedge Shot
      - Beat Inflation
      - Crested Wave
        - Drought
        - Gennaker
        - Surfers Paradise
        - Surface
      - Sportful
      - Journey At Sea
      - Precisionist
    - Garwol
    - Prudent
      - Manitoba
      - Mazarin
    - Babu's On
      - Santanas
  - Cantaber
    - Cantab
      - Cancottage
      - Little Owl
      - Little Polveir
      - The Thinker
  - Djafar
  - Marveil
    - Azteque
  - Roc Du Diable
  - Targui
    - Lord
    - Oreka
    - Cadiz
    - Sol D'Or
    - Zinder
    - Tardini
  - Cardanil
  - Emperor
    - Tipperary Star
      - Chateau Grande
  - Galcador
  - Djemlah
  - Liberator
  - Nyangal
    - Caporal
  - Rush
  - Argur
    - Arturo A
    - Estreno
  - Astyanax
    - Korok
    - Myjavan
  - Candaules
  - Pharel
    - Giramundi
  - Entente Cordiale
  - Jaddo
    - Diacano
  - Hugh Lupus
    - Hethersett
      - Dalry
      - Heathen
        - Harken
      - Blakeney
        - Norfolk Air
        - Charlotte's Choice
        - Coloso
        - Julio Mariner
        - Roscoe Blake
        - Sexton Blake
        - Commodore Blake
        - Sheringham
        - Tyrnavos
        - Electric
        - Band
        - Castle Rising
        - Just David
        - Satco
        - Dragon Negro
        - La Yegua
      - Harken
      - Nevado
        - Beethoven
      - Schuylerville
        - Avelino
        - Vinetu
        - Ajvanho
        - Armando
      - Healaugh Fox
      - Rarity
        - Decent Fellow
        - Pollerton
        - Rare April
        - Icelandic
        - Camiros
    - Lupus
    - Signal Rocket
    - Clouet
      - Aubry
    - Tiber
  - Olean
  - Atlas
  - Floriados
  - Ace of Clubs
    - Tartan Ace

== Pedigree ==
Pedigree of Djebel (5-j) bay horse, 1937
Sire Tourbillon (FR) B. 1928	Ksar (FR) ch. 1918	Bruleur (FR); B. 1910	Chouberski (FR)
Sire Tourbillon (FR) B. 1928	Ksar (FR) ch. 1918	Bruleur (FR); B. 1910	Basse Terre (FR)
Sire Tourbillon (FR) B. 1928	Ksar (FR) ch. 1918	Kizil Kourgan (FR); Ch. 1899	Omnium II (FR)
Sire Tourbillon (FR) B. 1928	Ksar (FR) ch. 1918	Kizil Kourgan (FR); Ch. 1899	Kasbah (FR)
Sire Tourbillon (FR) B. 1928	Durban (FR); B. 1918	Durbar (FR); B. 1911	Rabelais (GB)
Sire Tourbillon (FR) B. 1928	Durban (FR); B. 1918	Durbar (FR); B. 1911	Armenia (USA)
Sire Tourbillon (FR) B. 1928	Durban (FR); B. 1918	Banshee (FR); B. 1910	Irish Lad (USA)
Sire Tourbillon (FR) B. 1928	Durban (FR); B. 1918	Banshee (FR); B. 1910	Frizette (USA)
Dam Loika (FR) Ch. 1926	Gay Crusader (GB) b. 1914	Bayardo (GB); Br. 1906	Bay Ronald (GB)
Dam Loika (FR) Ch. 1926	Gay Crusader (GB) b. 1914	Bayardo (GB); Br. 1906	Galicia (GB)
Dam Loika (FR) Ch. 1926	Gay Crusader (GB) b. 1914	Gay Laura (GB) b. 1909	Beppo (GB)
Dam Loika (FR) Ch. 1926	Gay Crusader (GB) b. 1914	Gay Laura (GB) b. 1909	Galeottia (GB)
Dam Loika (FR) Ch. 1926	Coeur a Coeur (FR); Ch. 1921	Teddy (FR); B. 1913	Ajax (FR)
Dam Loika (FR) Ch. 1926	Coeur a Coeur (FR); Ch. 1921	Teddy (FR); B. 1913	Rondeau (GB)
Dam Loika (FR) Ch. 1926	Coeur a Coeur (FR); Ch. 1921	Ballantrae (GB); B. 1899	Ayrshire (GB)
Dam Loika (FR) Ch. 1926	Coeur a Coeur (FR); Ch. 1921	Ballantrae (GB); B. 1899	Abeyance (GB)
