= Our Babu =

Irish-bred Thoroughbred racehorse

- Sire: My Babu
- Grandsire: Djebel
- Dam: Glen Line
- Damsire: Blue Peter
- Sex: Stallion
- Foaled: 1952
- Country: Ireland
- Colour: Bay
- Breeder: Sir Oliver Lambart
- Owner: David Robinson
- Trainer: Geoffrey Brooke
- Record: 9:4-2-1

Major wins
- Champagne Stakes (1954); Middle Park Stakes (1954); 2000 Guineas (1955)

Awards
- Top-rated British Two-year-old (1954); Timeform joint-top-rated two-year-old colt (1954)

Our Babu (1952 – 16 December 1977) was an Irish-bred, British-trained Thoroughbred racehorse and sire. In a career that lasted from May 1954 to June 1955 he ran nine times and won four races. He was Britain's top-rated juvenile of 1954 when his win included the Middle Park Stakes and the Champagne Stakes, and went on to win the 2000 Guineas at Newmarket the following spring. After failing to win in two subsequent races he was retired to stud, where he had limited success as a sire of winners in the United States, Europe and Japan.

== Background ==
Our Babu was a bay horse with a white star and snip and distinctive "lop" ears bred in Ireland by Sir Oliver Lambart. He was sired by the champion two-year-old and 2000 Guineas winner My Babu out of the mare Glen Line who showed no ability as a racehorse but was a highly successful broodmare producing the Eclipse Stakes winner King of the Tudors. As a descendant of the mare Sunbridge, she was a member of the same Thoroughbred family as Windsor Lad.

As a yearling, Our Babu was sent to England for the Newmarket July sale, where he was bought for 2,700 guineas by David Robinson who sent him to be trained by Major Geoffrey Brooke at his Clarehaven Stables at Newmarket.

== Racing career ==
=== 1954: two-year-old season ===
Our Babu made a successful first appearance when he won the Spring Stakes at Newmarket in May. He was then sent to Royal Ascot in June, where he finished second to Eubulides (another son of My Babu) in the Chesham Stakes. He was beaten by Eubulides again in the Richmond Stakes at Goodwood in July, when he ran badly on soft ground. On firmer ground in autumn, Our Babu showed much improved form, winning the Champagne Stakes at the Doncaster St Leger meeting in September by two lengths from the Queen's colt Corporal. He was then sent to Newmarket in October for the six furlong Middle Park Stakes, one of the season's most important races for two-year-olds, and won in a close finish from the Irish-trained Hugh Lupus and the July Stakes winner Tamerlane. In the Free Handicap, a ranking of the best two-year-olds to have run in Britain, Our Babu was assigned the top rating of 133 pounds, one pound ahead of Hugh Lupus, thereby matching the achievement of his sire, who had been the top juvenile of 1947. He was also the top-rated colt in the independent Timeform ratings, sharing a mark of 131 with Beau Prince and Hugh Lupus.

=== 1955: three-year-old season ===
In April 1955, Our Babu returned from the winter break with a defeat by the Queens colt Alexander in the 2000 Guineas Trial over seven furlongs at Kempton Park. In the Classic 2000 Guineas over one mile at Newmarket he started at odds of 13/2, with Tamerlane starting 5/1 favourite in a strong field of twenty-three runners which included five runners from France and three from Ireland. Ridden by Doug Smith he prevailed in a closely contested finish, winning by a neck from Tamerlane, who had looked the likely winner a furlong from the finish with the fast-finishing French colt Klairon a short head away in third. After the race Smith commented "I was not sure that I had won, I just kept riding as hard as I could." Our Babu was again emulating My Babu, who won the race in 1948.

Our Babu failed to reproduce his best form in two subsequent races. Racing beyond a mile for the first and only time, he was strongly fancied for The Derby despite doubts about his stamina, but finished unplaced behind Phil Drake. At Royal Ascot he finished a well-beaten third to Tamerlane in the St. James's Palace Stakes. He was then sold to syndicate of American breeders for a reported $600,000 and retired from racing.

== Assessment ==
Our Babu's highest Timeform rating was 131 as a two-year-old in 1954, when the organisation rated him the equal-best horse of his generation in Europe. A rating of 130 is considered the mark of an above average Group One winner.

== Stud career ==
Our Babu initially stood as a stallion for his new owners in the United States. In 1963, he was returned to stand in England for four years before he was sold again and exported to Japan, where he died on 16 December 1977. He sired few horses of any consequence, although his progeny included the good racemare Alecee who won the Modesty Handicap and the Falls City Handicap.

== Sire line tree ==
- Our Babu
  - Dowdstown Charley
    - Prince Florimund

== Pedigree ==
Pedigree of Our Babu (IRE), bay stallion, 1952
Sire My Babu (FR) 1945	Djebel; 1937	Tourbillon	Ksar
Sire My Babu (FR) 1945	Djebel; 1937	Tourbillon	Durban
Sire My Babu (FR) 1945	Djebel; 1937	Loika	Gay Crusader
Sire My Babu (FR) 1945	Djebel; 1937	Loika	Coeur a Coeur
Sire My Babu (FR) 1945	Perfume; 1938	Badruddin	Blandford
Sire My Babu (FR) 1945	Perfume; 1938	Badruddin	Mumtaz Mahal
Sire My Babu (FR) 1945	Perfume; 1938	Lavendula	Pharos
Sire My Babu (FR) 1945	Perfume; 1938	Lavendula	Sweet Lavender
Dam Glen Line (GB) 1942	Blue Peter; 1936	Fairway	Phalaris
Dam Glen Line (GB) 1942	Blue Peter; 1936	Fairway	Scapa Flow
Dam Glen Line (GB) 1942	Blue Peter; 1936	Fancy Free	Stefan the Great
Dam Glen Line (GB) 1942	Blue Peter; 1936	Fancy Free	Celiba
Dam Glen Line (GB) 1942	Scotia's Glen; 1935	Beresford	Friar Marcus
Dam Glen Line (GB) 1942	Scotia's Glen; 1935	Beresford	Bayberry
Dam Glen Line (GB) 1942	Scotia's Glen; 1935	Queen Scotia	Tetratema
Dam Glen Line (GB) 1942	Scotia's Glen; 1935	Queen Scotia	Sunbridge (Family:19-b)
