= Grand Prix Stakes =

- Class: Group 3
- Location: Eagle Farm Racecourse; Brisbane, Australia
- Inaugurated: 1971
- Race type: Thoroughbred - Flat racing
- Sponsor: Seven (2025)

Race information
- Distance: 1,800 metres
- Surface: Turf
- Track: Right-handed
- Qualification: Three-year-olds
- Weight: Set weights with penalties
- Purse: A$300,000 (2025)

The Grand Prix Stakes is a Brisbane Racing Club Group 3 Thoroughbred horse race held under set weights with penalties conditions, for horses aged three years old, over a distance of 1800 metres held at Eagle Farm Racecourse, Brisbane, Australia. It was held during the Queensland Winter Racing Carnival but moved to December in 2019.

== History ==
In 2019, the Grand Prix Stakes was moved to its new summer home in December along with a prizemoney increase from $150,000 to $250,000. This race was formerly held during the Brisbane winter racing carnival and was run twice during the 2019-2020 racing season, in May & December.

The following horses have completed the Grand Prix Stakes–Queensland Derby double:
Lefroy (1978), Double Century (1979), Kingston Town (1980), Mr. Cromwell (1981), Our Planet (1982), Librici (1984), Handy Proverb (1986), Hidden Rhythm (1989), Dorset Downs (1991), Air Seattle (1993), Half Hennessy (2003), Ice Chariot (2006) and Brambles (2012)

The race has had several changes in distance.

=== Venue ===
- 1971–2009 - Eagle Farm
- 2010–2016 - Doomben Racecourse
- 2017 - Eagle Farm
- 2018 - Doomben Racecourse
- 2019 onwards - Eagle Farm

=== Grade ===
- 1971–1978 - Principal Race
- 1979–2005 - Group 2
- 2006 onwards - Group 3

=== Distance ===
- 1971–1972 - 1 1/2 miles (~2400 metres)
- 1973–1974 – 2400 metres
- 1975–1982 – 2200 metres
- 1983 – 2232 metres
- 1984–1989 – 2200 metres
- 1990 – 2244 metres
- 1991 – 2225 metres
- 1992–2001 – 2200 metres
- 2002 – 2144 metres
- 2003 – 2140 metres
- 2004–2009 – 2100 metres
- 2009–2014 – 2200 metres
- 2015 – 2020 metres
- 2016 - 2021 - 2200 metres
- 2022 - 2023 - 2100 metres
- 2024 onwards - 1800 metres

== Winners ==
Past winners of the race are as follows.

- 2025 - Matias
- 2024 - Beau Dazzler
- 2023 - Encoder
- 2022 - Kovalica
- 2021 - Gypsy Goddess
- 2020 - The Elanora
- 2019 (Dec) - Chains Of Honour
- 2019 (May) - Fun Fact
- 2018 - Heavenly Thought
- 2017 - Order Again
- 2016 - Mackintosh
- 2015 - Upham
- 2014 - Vilanova
- 2013 - Hawkspur
- 2012 - Brambles
- 2011 - Turnitup
- 2010 - Kutchinsky
- 2009 - Saint Minerva
- 2008 - Bell Academy
- 2007 - Sirmione
- 2006 - Ice Chariot
- 2005 - Spuruson
- 2004 - Reclaim
- 2003 - Half Hennessy
- 2002 - Distinctly Secret
- 2001 - Reenact
- 2000 - Make Mine Magic
- 1999 - Conair
- 1998 - race not held
- 1997 - race not held
- 1996 - Faience
- 1995 - Perfect Bound
- 1994 - Sky Watch
- 1993 - Air Seattle
- 1992 - In The Event
- 1991 - Dorset Downs
- 1990 - Stargazer
- 1989 - Hidden Rhythm
- 1988 - race not held
- 1987 - Finezza Belle
- 1986 - Handy Proverb
- 1985 - Our Sophia
- 1984 - Librici
- 1983 - So Good
- 1982 - Our Planet
- 1981 - Mr. Cromwell
- 1980 - Kingston Town
- 1979 - Double Century
- 1978 - Lefroy
- 1977 - Surround
- 1976 - Balmerino
- 1975 - Lord Randolph
- 1974 - Asgard
- 1973 - Mighty Keys
- 1972 - Latin Knight
- 1971 - Mode

== See also ==
- List of Australian Group races
- Group races
