= Tourbillon (horse) =

French-bred Thoroughbred racehorse

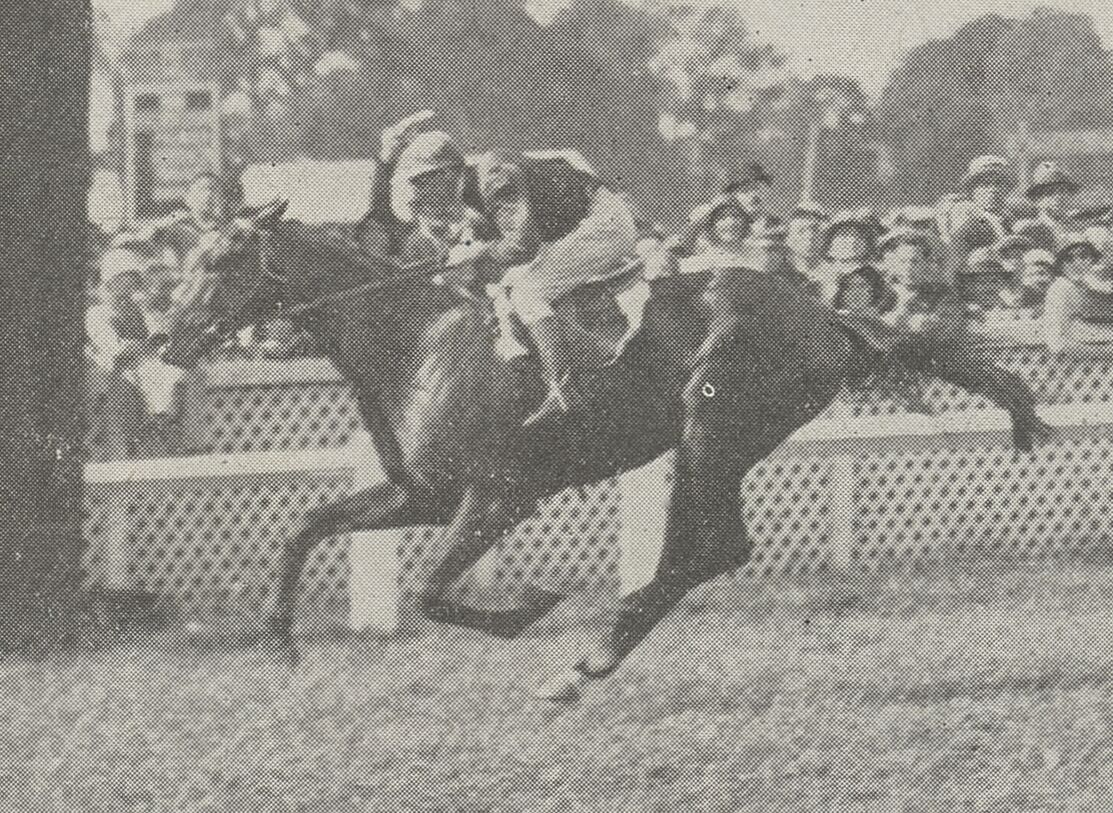
- Prix du Jockey Club (14 June 1931, Chantilly)
- Sire: Ksar
- Grandsire: Bruleur
- Dam: Durban
- Damsire: Durbar
- Sex: Stallion
- Foaled: 1928
- Country: France
- Colour: Bay
- Breeder: Marcel Boussac
- Owner: Marcel Boussac
- Trainer: William Hall
- Record: 12-6-1-1
- Earnings: not found

Major wins
- Prix de Verneuil (1930); Zukunfts Rennen (1930); Prix Lupin (1931); Prix Greffulhe (1931); Prix Hocquart (1931); Prix du Jockey Club (1931)

Awards
- Leading sire in France (1940, 1942, 1945)

Tourbillon (1928–1954) was a French Thoroughbred racehorse and Champion sire.

== Background ==
Tourbillon, whose name means "whirlwind" in French, was bred and raced by the greatest French breeder of thoroughbreds of the twentieth century, Marcel Boussac. Tourbillon was sired by Ksar, a back-to-back winner of the Prix de l'Arc de Triomphe and Leading sire in France in 1931 whose own sire, Bruleur, won the 1913 Grand Prix de Paris and was the Leading sire in France in 1921, 1924, and 1929. Tourbillon's dam, Durban, was an outstanding runner who won several top races in France which are now Group One events. Damsire, Durbar won England's Epsom Derby in 1914.

== Racing career ==
Tourbillon was a winner of the Prix du Jockey Club at three, and the Prix Lupin at age three.

== Stud career ==
Tourbillon became the foundation stallion for Marcel Boussac's Haras de Fresnay-le-Buffard at Neuvy-au-Houlme in Lower Normandy. A sire of sires, Tourbillon was the Leading sire in France in 1940, 1942, 1945. Among his progeny were:

- Goya (1934) – Gimcrack Stakes, St. James's Palace Stakes, Prix Boiard, two-time Leading sire in France
- Djebel (1937) – 2,000 Guineas Stakes, Prix de l'Arc de Triomphe, two-time Leading sire in France
- Coaraze (b. 1942) -Prix du Jockey Club, Grand Prix de Saint-Cloud, Prix d'Ispahan (2×)
- Caracalla (1942) – Grand Prix de Paris, Prix Royal Oak, Ascot Gold Cup, Prix de l'Arc de Triomphe
- Ambiorix (1946) – Grand Critérium, Prix Lupin

Some of Tourbillon's offspring, particularly through his grandson, My Babu, were successful competitors in show jumping, dressage, and three-day event disciplines.

== Sire line tree ==
Tourbillon descendants (click to expand)
- Tourbillon
  - Serdab
  - Goya
    - Goyama
      - Gombar
      - Patras
      - Tenareze
        - Nelcius
      - Vittor Pasani
      - Sourire
    - Nirgal
      - Nail
        - Rivet
    - Dariel
    - Giafar
      - Marion Island
    - Oman
      - Dusky Oman
      - Impresario
    - Sandjar
      - Jardiniere
      - Ogan
        - Cleuet
          - Kijockey
        - Eylau
          - Laughing Boy
          - Novis
          - Primo Rico
          - Gaillardet
    - Goyaz
      - Obagoy
      - Gyn
      - Rapaz
      - Sultan El Yago
      - Damasco
    - Good Luck
    - L'Aiglon
    - Goma
    - Orbaneja
      - Major's Dilemma
        - Dilema
        - Garboso
    - Pintor
    - Arrogate
    - Artismo
    - Goyamo
  - Marcius
  - Cillas
  - Gaspillage
  - Last Post
    - Kobus
  - Adaris
    - Burning Flame
  - Billy of Spain
  - Meridien
    - Manitou
    - Medium
      - Master Boing
      - Misti
        - Pamir
        - Mistigri
        - Roselier
    - Sphinx
  - Wirbelwind
    - Kaliber
      - Don Carlos
  - Ringo
    - Xanthor
  - Tornado
    - Fontenay
      - Le Beau Prince
      - Tropique
        - Creole
        - Gladstone
        - Paveh
      - Saim
      - Gelsemium
    - Lacaduv
      - Pier Capponi
    - Aquino
      - Cedric
      - Mister Tory
    - Fontenoy
      - Robot
    - Tosco
      - Tracy
    - Magabit
      - Paraje
    - Tyrone
      - Le Mesnil
    - Mr Tor
    - Thymus
    - Tiepoletto
      - Tiepolo
        - Conor Pass
  - Micipsa
  - Le Volcan
    - Triguero
    - Tarzan
    - Milord
      - Amoretto
  - Caracalla II
    - Claudius
  - Coaraze
    - Canthare
    - Xasco
    - Empyreu
    - Emerson
      - Emerilo
      - Rimesault
      - Solicitor
    - Coaralde
    - Viziane
    - Rhone
  - Djask
  - Cadir
    - Pantheon
  - Timor
    - Tahoe
      - Tai
    - Pronto
      - Indian Chief
      - Practicante
        - Braseante
        - Vacilante
          - Troyanos
        - Vituperante
        - Especulante
        - Clorhidratante
        - Hidalgante
        - Tropicante
      - Utopico
      - Balconaje
      - Uruguayo
      - Redtop
      - Primed
        - His Latest
  - Tourment
    - Chingacgook
      - Nic
        - Tiaia
      - Han D'Island
    - Zagros
    - Kaiserstuhl
      - Oktavio
      - Carlos Primero
    - Violon D'Ingres
      - Montal
        - Manesco
        - Algarve
      - Vitaner
  - Amasis
  - Tournoi
  - Turmoil
    - Popof III
    - Escart III
      - L'Escargot
      - Garoupe
    - Bontur
    - Tajon
  - Ambiorix
    - Ambler
    - Gray Phantom
    - Ambehaving
      - Ampose
      - More Scents
      - Sloopy
      - Augustus Bay
      - Good Behaving
    - Amber Morn
      - Royal Chocolate
        - Gone to Royalty
      - Amber Herod
    - Count Amber
      - Amberoid
      - My Pal Houston
    - Ambiopoise
      - Faraway Son
        - Bynoderm
        - Boitron
        - Mantle
      - Twice Worthy
    - Hitting Away
    - Sheet Anchor
      - Stein
      - Mountdrago
        - Monte Ruisenor
        - Monte Simon
        - Monte Pirata
        - Montubio
        - Monte Silvestre
    - Pinjara
    - Pleasure Seeker
  - Blue Fox
  - Charleval
  - Cagire
    - El Toro
    - Homer
  - Fort Napoleon
    - Devon
    - Estheta
    - Tibetano
      - Laurus
  - Magnific
  - Tournai
  - Terrington
  - Touragua
    - Frisco
      - Franjezco
      - Principe Duero
    - Anglo
    - Pongo
    - Ricky
    - Donagua
    - Snobissimo
    - Ragazzo
    - Koku
  - Datour
    - Dare
  - Djebel
    - Arbar
      - Abdos
        - Abgal
        - Adam Van Vianen
      - Arcor
    - Clarion
      - Klairon
        - Blanc Bleu
        - Karol
        - Snark
        - Desert Call
        - Caldarello
        - Premier Violon
        - D'Urberville
        - Lorenzaccio
        - Luthier
        - Disguise
        - Klairvimy
        - Rose Laurel
        - Common Land
        - Shangamuzo
        - Beaudelaire
      - Rumesnil
        - Rumpelstiltskin
      - Pantene
      - Net
      - Le Francais
    - Djelal
    - Le Lavandou
      - Le Levanstell
        - Levmoss
        - Sans-Fin
        - Allangrange
        - My Swallow
        - Barclay Joe
        - Chacal
        - Art Style
        - Le Michel
        - Mart Lane
        - Le Moss
    - Le Roitelet
    - Damnos
    - Dernah
    - Djebe
      - Blast
        - Black Sky
      - Joy
    - Djebelilla
      - Dyur
    - Djeddah
      - Midsummer Night
        - Quy
        - Jimmy Reppin
        - Alverton
    - Djefou
      - Rapace
        - Rapanni
      - Le Sanglier
      - Puissant Chef
      - Courroux
    - My Babu
      - Better Boy
        - Craftsman
        - Tolerance
        - Century
        - Reckless
      - Eubulides
      - Our Babu
        - Dowdstown Charley
      - Babur
      - Dionisio
        - Saint Denys
      - Milesian
        - Atlantis
        - Mystery
        - Ionian
        - Partholon
        - Western Wind
        - Falcon
      - King Babar
      - Primera
      - Shearwater
      - The Hammer
        - Sympatico
        - Tong
      - Babu
      - Babu Dancer
        - JJ Babu
      - Bronze Babu
      - Crozier
        - Inverness Drive
        - Wedge Shot
        - Beat Inflation
        - Crested Wave
        - Sportful
        - Journey At Sea
        - Precisionist
      - Garwol
      - Prudent
        - Manitoba
        - Mazarin
      - Babu's On
        - Santanas
    - Cantaber
      - Cantab
        - Cancottage
        - Little Owl
        - Little Polveir
        - The Thinker
    - Djafar
    - Marveil
      - Azteque
    - Roc Du Diable
    - Targui
      - Lord
      - Oreka
      - Cadiz
      - Sol D'Or
      - Zinder
      - Tardini
    - Cardanil
    - Emperor
      - Tipperary Star
        - Chateau Grande
    - Galcador
    - Djemlah
    - Liberator
    - Nyangal
      - Caporal
    - Rush
    - Argur
      - Arturo A
      - Estreno
    - Astyanax
      - Korok
      - Myjavan
    - Candaules
    - Pharel
      - Giramundi
    - Entente Cordiale
    - Jaddo
      - Diacano
    - Hugh Lupus
      - Hethersett
        - Dalry
        - Heathen
        - Blakeney
        - Harken
        - Nevado
        - Schuylerville
        - Healaugh Fox
        - Rarity
      - Lupus
      - Signal Rocket
      - Clouet
        - Aubry
      - Tiber
    - Olean
    - Atlas
    - Floriados
    - Ace of Clubs
      - Tartan Ace

== Pedigree ==
Pedigree of Tourbillon
Sire Ksar	Bruleur	Chouberski	Gardefeu
Sire Ksar	Bruleur	Chouberski	Campanule
Sire Ksar	Bruleur	Basse Terre	Omnium II*
Sire Ksar	Bruleur	Basse Terre	Bijou
Sire Ksar	Kizil Kourgan	Omnium II*	Upas
Sire Ksar	Kizil Kourgan	Omnium II*	Bluette
Sire Ksar	Kizil Kourgan	Kasbah	Vigilant
Sire Ksar	Kizil Kourgan	Kasbah	Katia
Dam Durban	Durbar	Rabelais	St Simon
Dam Durban	Durbar	Rabelais	Satirical
Dam Durban	Durbar	Armenia	Meddler
Dam Durban	Durbar	Armenia	Urania
Dam Durban	Banshee	Irish Lad	Candlemas
Dam Durban	Banshee	Irish Lad	Arrowgrass
Dam Durban	Banshee	Frizette	Hamburg
Dam Durban	Banshee	Frizette	Ondulee

* Tourbillon is inbred 4S x 3S to the stallion Omnium II, meaning that he appears fourth and third generation on the sire side of his pedigree.
