= Luthier (horse) =

French-bred Thoroughbred racehorse

- Sire: Klairon
- Grandsire: Clairon
- Dam: Flute Enchantee
- Damsire: Cranach
- Sex: Stallion
- Foaled: 1965
- Country: France
- Colour: Dark Bay/Brown
- Breeder: Baron Guy de Rothschild
- Owner: Baron Guy de Rothschild
- Trainer: Geoffroy Watson
- Record: 10: 4-2-0
- Earnings: FF953,285

Major wins
- Prix Jacques le Marois (1968); Prix Lupin (1968); Prix Noailles (1968)

Awards
- Leading sire in France (1976, 1982, 1983, 1984); Leading broodmare sire in France (1987-1993, 1995)

Luthier (1965–1981) was a French Thoroughbred racehorse who was the Leading sire in France on four occasions. Bred at Baron Guy de Rothschild's Haras de Meautry, he was trained by Geoffroy Watson. Racing for Baron Rothschild at age three, Luthier won important races in France but is best remembered as a Champion sire and broodmare sire.

== Stud record ==
Retired to stud in 1970 at Haras de Étréham in Lower Normandy, he was the French Champion First Crop Sire of 1973 and the Leading sire in France in 1976, 1982, 1983, and 1984. A sire of sixty-one stakes winners, among his notable progeny, Luthier sired Sagace, winner of the 1984 Prix de l'Arc de Triomphe and the filly Riverqueen whose wins at age three in 1976 included the Grand Prix de Saint-Cloud, Poule d'Essai des Pouliches, and Prix Saint-Alary. Luthier was also the sire of Saint Cyrien, the 1982 Champion 2-year-old colt in France and Leading sire in France in 1990, plus the 1974 and 1983 Oaks d'Italia winner and the 1980 Premio Regina Elena (Italian 1,000 Guineas) winner.

Luthier was the Leading sire in France eight times with ninety-six stakes winners including 1989 St. Leger Stakes winner, Michelozzo.

== Sire line tree ==
- Luthier
  - Ashmore
  - Riverton
  - Blue Vermillion
  - Condorcet
    - Condell
  - Dandy Lute
    - Bizen Nishiki
      - Daitaku Helios
  - Tip Moss
    - Pitchounet
  - Twig Moss
    - Handy Proverb
  - Guadanini
  - Montcontour
  - Over The River
    - Cool Ground
    - Cool Dawn
  - Galiani
  - Tahitian King
  - No Lute
    - Furor
    - Video Rock
      - El Paso III
  - Galant Vert
  - Sagace
    - Arcangues
      - Ar Alan
      - Lucky Step
      - Aiai Lucky
  - Saint Cyrien
    - Beloved Charly
    - Epervier Bleu
      - El Hechizodo
  - Yawa
  - Idealiste
  - King Luthier

== Pedigree ==
Pedigree of Luthier (FR), brown stallion, 1965
Sire Klairon (FR) 1952	Clarion (FR); 1944	Djebel	Tourbillon
Sire Klairon (FR) 1952	Clarion (FR); 1944	Djebel	Loika
Sire Klairon (FR) 1952	Clarion (FR); 1944	Columba	Colorado
Sire Klairon (FR) 1952	Clarion (FR); 1944	Columba	Gay Bird
Sire Klairon (FR) 1952	Kalmia (FR); 1931	Kantar	Alcantara
Sire Klairon (FR) 1952	Kalmia (FR); 1931	Kantar	Karabe
Sire Klairon (FR) 1952	Kalmia (FR); 1931	Sweet Lavender	Swynford*
Sire Klairon (FR) 1952	Kalmia (FR); 1931	Sweet Lavender	Marchetta
Dam Flute Enchantee (FR) 1950	Cranach (FR); 1938	Coronoch	Hurry On
Dam Flute Enchantee (FR) 1950	Cranach (FR); 1938	Coronoch	Wet Kiss
Dam Flute Enchantee (FR) 1950	Cranach (FR); 1938	Reine Isaure	Blandford*^
Dam Flute Enchantee (FR) 1950	Cranach (FR); 1938	Reine Isaure	Oriane
Dam Flute Enchantee (FR) 1950	Montagnan (FR); 1937	Brantome	Blandford*^
Dam Flute Enchantee (FR) 1950	Montagnan (FR); 1937	Brantome	Vitamine
Dam Flute Enchantee (FR) 1950	Montagnan (FR); 1937	Mauretania	Tetratema
Dam Flute Enchantee (FR) 1950	Montagnan (FR); 1937	Mauretania	Lady Maureen

* Luthier is inbred 4D x 4D to the stallion Blandford, meaning that he appears fourth generation twice on the dam side of his pedigree.

*^ Luthier is inbred 4S x 5D x 5D to the stallion Swynford, meaning that he appears fourth generation on the sire side of his pedigree and fifth generation twice (via Blandford)^ on the dam side of his pedigree.
