= Matthew A. McGee =

American jockey

Matt McGee
Personal information
- Born: December 1890 Covington, Kentucky, USA
- Died: October 28, 1949 (aged 58) Kenton, Kentucky, USA
- Occupation: Jockey

Horse racing career
- Sport: Horse racing

Major racing wins
- Live Oak Selling Stakes (1906); Clark Handicap (1909); Mermaid Stakes (1910); Metropolitan Handicap (1910); Tidal Stakes (1910); Withers Stakes (1910); Juarez Derby (1911); Poule d'Essai des Pouliches (1913); Prix de Diane (1920) English Triple Crown wins: Epsom Derby (1914)

Significant horses
- Durbar, Fashion Plate, Round The World

Matthew A. McGee (December 1890 - October 28, 1949) was an American jockey born and raised in Covington, Kentucky who rode Durbar to victory in the 1914 Epsom Derby, England's most prestigious race, for Herman B. Duryea. Based in France his other winners for Duryea included the 1913 French 1000 Guineas (the Poule d'Essai des Pouliches) on Banshee. Afterwards he rode for several years for Baron Edouard de Rothschild up to 1927.

Note that his name is frequently misspelled as "MacGee" in European records, including the Media Guide for the Epsom Derby and on a 1923 sports card. His temporary licenses to ride in England were issued in the name of "Matthew A MacGee" and later "Mathew A MacGee".
