= Galcador =

French-bred Thoroughbred racehorse

- Sire: Djebel
- Grandsire: Tourbillon
- Dam: Pharyva
- Damsire: Pharos
- Sex: Stallion
- Foaled: 1947
- Country: France
- Colour: Chestnut
- Breeder: Haras de Fresnay-le-Buffard
- Owner: Marcel Boussac
- Trainer: Charles Semblat
- Record: 4: 3-1-0
- Earnings: ₣913,400 & £17,010

Major wins
- Prix Daphnis (1950); Epsom Derby (1950)
- Last updated on January 10, 2010

Galcador (1947–1970) was a French Thoroughbred racehorse and sire. In a career that lasted from autumn 1949 to June 1950 he ran four times and won three races. In 1950 he won England's most prestigious race, The Derby. He never raced after his win at Epsom and was retired to stud where he made no impact as a sire of winners. He was eventually exported to Japan where he died in 1970.

== Background ==
Galcador, a chestnut horse with a white blaze and one white foot, was bred by his owner Marcel Boussac. Boussac also bred the colt's parents, the stallion Djebel and the mare Pharyva. As a son of Djebel, he was a representative of the Byerley Turk sire-line unlike the vast majority of modern thoroughbreds, who descend directly from the Darley Arabian. Pharyva never won a race, but bred several winners and was a descendant of Zariba, the dam of Corrida. Galcador was trained by Charles Semblat, a former jockey who was responsible for Boussac's horses between 1944 and 1954.

== Racing career ==
As a two-year-old in 1949, Galcador won his only race, the Prix de Saint-Firmin over 1000m at Longchamp.

On his three-year-old debut he won the 1600m Prix Daphnis at Le Tremblay, after which he was identified as Boussac's main Derby contender, and was then moved up to the highest class for the Poule d'Essai des Poulains at Longchamp on 14 May. He finished second, beaten half a length by Tantieme after the two colts had raced together throughout the closing stages. The winner went on to win the next two runnings of the Prix de l'Arc de Triomphe.

The Derby was run in fine weather ten days later at Epsom Downs Racecourse. Galcador, ridden by the Australian jockey Rae Johnstone, started at odds of 100/9 (11/1) in a field of twenty-five runners with the American-bred and owned Prince Simon being made favourite. A colt named Pewter Platter took an early lead but Prince Simon took over after two furlongs and was two lengths clear on the turn into the straight. Johnstone had Galcador in fourth place on the final turn and produced the French colt with a sustained run on the outside. Inside the final furlong, Galcador caught Prince Simon and went almost a length in front only for the American colt to rally strongly in the final strides. On the line Galcador won the Derby by a rapidly diminishing margin of a head. The first prize of £17,010 was the largest awarded up to that time. Commenting on his victory, Johnstone described Galcador as "essentially a miler" and only the fourth best colt in the Semblat stable.

== Assessment ==
In their book A Century of Champions, John Randall and Tony Morris rated Galcador an “average” Derby winner.

Timeform awarded Galcador a rating of 133 in 1950, three pounds behind the top-rated three-year-old Tantieme. A rating of 130 is considered the mark of an above average European Group One winner.

== Stud career ==
Retired to stud, Galcador stood at Boussac's breeding operation from 1951 through 1959. Sold to breeders in Japan for the 1960 season, he stood there until his death in 1970. His offspring met with limited success in racing.

== Pedigree ==
Pedigree of Galcador (FR), chestnut stallion, 1947
| Sire Djebel (FR) 1937 | Tourbillon; 1928 | Ksar | Bruleur |
| Sire Djebel (FR) 1937 | Tourbillon; 1928 | Ksar | Kizil Kourgan |
| Sire Djebel (FR) 1937 | Tourbillon; 1928 | Durban | Durbar |
| Sire Djebel (FR) 1937 | Tourbillon; 1928 | Durban | Banshee |
| Sire Djebel (FR) 1937 | Loika; 1926 | Gay Crusader | Bayardo* |
| Sire Djebel (FR) 1937 | Loika; 1926 | Gay Crusader | Gay Laura |
| Sire Djebel (FR) 1937 | Loika; 1926 | Coeur a Coeur | Teddy |
| Sire Djebel (FR) 1937 | Loika; 1926 | Coeur a Coeur | Ballantrae |
| Dam Pharyva (FR) 1936 | Pharos; 1920 | Phalaris | Polymelus |
| Dam Pharyva (FR) 1936 | Pharos; 1920 | Phalaris | Bromus |
| Dam Pharyva (FR) 1936 | Pharos; 1920 | Scapa Flow | Chaucer |
| Dam Pharyva (FR) 1936 | Pharos; 1920 | Scapa Flow | Anchora |
| Dam Pharyva (FR) 1936 | Souryva; 1930 | Gainsborough | Bayardo* |
| Dam Pharyva (FR) 1936 | Souryva; 1930 | Gainsborough | Rosedrop |
| Dam Pharyva (FR) 1936 | Souryva; 1930 | L'Esperance | Pommern |
| Dam Pharyva (FR) 1936 | Souryva; 1930 | L'Esperance | Zariba (Family: 9-e) |

* Galcador is inbred 4S x 4D to the stallion Bayardo, meaning that he appears fourth generation on the sire side of his pedigree and fourth generation on the dam side of his pedigree.
