= Charles Semblat =

French horse trainer and jockey

Personal information
- Born: 7 April 1897 Saint-Sornin-Lavolps, France
- Died: 10 July 1972 (aged 75) Chantilly, France
- Occupations: Jockey, Trainer

Horse racing career
- Sport: Horse racing

Major racing wins
- As a jockey: British Classic Race wins: 2000 Guineas (1) Major French race wins: Prix du Jockey Club (3); Grand Prix de Paris (1); Prix de l'Arc de Triomphe (3) As a trainer: British Classic Race wins: Epsom Derby (1); Epsom Oaks (1); St. Leger Stakes (2) Major French race wins: Prix du Jockey Club (6); Grand Prix de Paris (1); Prix de l'Arc de Triomphe (4)

Honours
- French Champion Jockey (1924, 1925, 1926, 1927, 1928, 1934); British Champion Trainer (1951)

Significant horses
- Pearl Cap, Motrico, Djebel, Ardan, Marsyas, Caracalla, Arbar, Coronation, Galcador

Charles Henri Semblat (1897–1972) was a French jockey and racehorse trainer. Semblat was leading French jockey for more than twenty years before his riding career was ended by injury. He subsequently had an even more successful career as trainer for the owner-breeder Marcel Boussac. In 1950 he became Champion Trainer in Britain without ever visiting the country. Semblat is the only person to have both ridden and trained the winner of France's most important race, the Prix de l'Arc de Triomphe.

== Riding career ==
Semblat became an apprentice jockey at a young age and rode his first winner at the age of 13 in 1910. For a time he rode both on the flat and over jumps, before specialising in the former discipline. He attracted the attention of some of the leading figures French racing and became closely associated with the Chantilly trainers William Cunnington and Frank Carter. Among the horses he rode for Carter were Mon Talisman (Prix du Jockey Club and Prix de l'Arc de Triomphe in 1927), Pearl Cap (Arc de Triomphe 1931) and Clairvoyant (Prix du Jockey Club and Grand Prix de Paris).

Semblat was the leading jockey in France for five successive years from 1924 (when he was only the second French-born rider to win that title) and added a sixth championship in 1934. During this period he was regarded as "easily the best jockey in France", and his status was comparable to that of the British Champion Steve Donoghue. In 1927 his achievements were recognised when he was presented with the Mérite agricole award by the French Minister of Agriculture.

He won a third Arc on the seven-year-old Motrico in 1937 and in the same year he won his only British Classic Race winner when he rode the Carter-trained outsider Le Ksar to success in the 2000 Guineas at Newmarket Racecourse. Le Ksar failed in The Derby despite Semblat's confidence: he claimed to have made a careful study of the course "with maps and a book" and to have "already won the race on paper".

Following the outbreak of the Second World War, the British jockey Charlie Elliott returned to England, giving up his job as the first jockey for the Marcel Boussac the dominant owner-breeder of his time. Semblat replaced Elliott and rode for Boussac with considerable success and soon took over the role of trainer. In 1944 Semblat sustained serious injuries in a fall which forced him to retire from riding.

== Training career ==
Semblat was an immediate success as a trainer at Chantilly where he trained a string of forty horses. By the end of the war he had won two Arc de Triomphes with Djebel and Ardan and trained the stayer Marsyas to the first of four consecutive wins in the Prix du Cadran. This success was achieved despite wartime restrictions which saw the closure of Longchamp, France's most important racecourse, as well as strict limits imposed both on travel and on the amount of grain used for the horses' feed. Semblat's training regime involved giving his charges a great deal of walking exercise and ensuring that each horse had a dedicated groom. In the immediate post-war years he continued to dominate French racing, winning further Arcs with Caracalla and Coronation and winning six runnings of the Prix du Jockey Club in eleven years.

Semblat was keen to exploit the opportunities which the end of hostilities brought for international competition. In 1946 he sent his horses to Royal Ascot and won the Gold Cup with Caracalla and the Queen Alexandra Stakes with Marsyas. He won a second Gold Cup with Arbar in 1948 and in the following year sent Djeddah across the English Channel to take both the Eclipse Stakes and the Champion Stakes. Semblat's best year in Britain, however, was 1950 when he won three of the five British classics. At Epsom in June he won both The Derby with Galcador and the Oaks with the filly Asmena (a sister of Marsyas, Caracalla and Arbar). In September he won the St Leger with Scratch. His earnings that year made him British Champion trainer despite the fact that he had never set foot in the country during the season, whilst Boussac won the owner's championship Even when Galcador won the Derby, Semblat preferred to attend to his day-to-day responsibilities at Chantilly. He won a fourth British classic when Talma won the St Leger in the following year.

The working relationship between Semblat and Boussac eventually deteriorated and in 1954 the trainer was dismissed and replaced by Charlie Elliott, the man he had supplanted fourteen years earlier. Semblat continued to train horses, but with less success, recording his last major win when Thymus took the Poule d'Essai des Poulains in 1959.
