= Double Century (horse) =

Australian Thoroughbred racehorse

Double Century (AUS)
- Sire: Century (AUS)
- Grandsire: Better Boy (IRE)
- Dam: Hello Love (AUS)
- Damsire: Adamastor (FR)
- Sex: Stallion
- Foaled: 6 October 1975
- Died: 26 March 1997 (aged 21)
- Country: Australia
- Colour: Brown
- Owner: Part owned: Clarke Anthony shields and Ron McDonell
- Trainer: Ron McDonell
- Jockey: Mick Mallion
- Record: 37: 7-8-6
- Earnings: A$322,450

Major wins
- Sydney Cup (1979); Queensland Derby (1979); Grand Prix Stakes (1979)

Named by Clarke Anthony Shields, Double Century was a notable Australian Thoroughbred race horse.

A son of Century (AUS) from the mare Hello Love (AUS), he was foaled in 1975 and was trained throughout his career by Ron McDonell. Double Century was part owned by Clarke Anthony Shields and Ron McDonell.

== Racing record ==
Double Century raced in each of his 2YO, 3YO and 4YO seasons but remarkable every one of his wins was recorded in his 3YO year.

His best ‘win’ was the 1979 AJC Derby which he won by ¾ of a length in race record time but was subsequently demoted to second place following a protest. The race was awarded to the second placed horse, the champion Dulcify.

He was also unlucky to encounter another champion in Kingston Town, running second to him in the 1980 Sydney Cup and Tancred Stakes. In the same season he also ran second to Ming Dynasty in the Australian Cup.

Despite his string of second placings in good races he was successful in three Group 1 races as a 3YO, victorious in the 1979 Sydney Cup, Queensland Derby and the Grand Prix Stakes.

== Stud record ==
Following retirement, he stood at Balfour Stud and later at Glen Avon Lodge. His best progeny was Stylish Century who won the 1989 Victoria Derby and Spring Champion Stakes as well as the 1991 Queen Elizabeth Stakes.

Apart from Stylish Century, Double Century also produced black type winners like Miss Stephenson (Carnival Handicap at Doomben and Easter Cup at Eagle Farm), Dual Scope (Brisbane Handicap at Eagle Farm), Bigamy (Carbine Club Stakes at Randwick) and Burglar of Bamff (Ipswich Cup).

Double Century died in 1997 aged 21.
