= JJ Babu =

Event horse

- Breed: Thoroughbred
- Sire: Babu Dancer
- Grandsire: My Babu
- Dam: Polymelia
- Maternal grandsire: Tudorka
- Sex: Gelding
- Foaled: 1974 Germantown, Maryland
- Died: 1989; Fair Hill Horse Trials, Maryland
- Country: United States
- Colour: Bay with a small star
- Breeder: Charles B Eiler

JJ Babu was a Thoroughbred gelding that excelled in the sport of eventing, under American rider Bruce Davidson.

JJ Babu was bred in Maryland. He was purchased by Davidson as a yearling. He was not only a good-looking horse, but was well-tempered. The gelding excelled in all three phases, which explains his success.

Partnered for 15 years with Davidson, the horse won the team gold at the 1984 Summer Olympics, but also the Rolex Kentucky Three Day in 1983. He competed at the advanced level for nine seasons, and started in 12 CCIs.

Davidson described JJ Babu:

"The world never saw a greater horse–he was great to look at, he had great manners, and he gave me 15 fabulous years...He was the ultimate event horse; everyone could ride him, even the children. He was a great friend and companion..."

JJ Babu was destroyed in April 1989 at the age of 15, after he fractured a pastern bone at the Fair Hill Horse Trials.

== Competition Record ==
1988

- 2nd Rolex Kentucky Three Day CCI*** (Lexington, KY)

1987

- 1st Stockholm CCI *** (Sweden)
- 1st Somborne

1986

- 2nd Burghley Horse Trials CCI *** (England)
- 1st Gatcombe Park
- 6th Dauntsey Horse Trials
- 6th Badminton Horse Trials CCIO *** (England)

1985

- 11th Badminton CCIO ***
- 2nd Brigstock

1984

- Team gold and individually 13th the Los Angeles Olympics

1983

- 11th Burghley Horse Trials CCI***
- 1st Rolex Kentucky Three Day CCI *** (Lexington, KY)

1982

- 5th Dauntsey
- 2nd Badminton Horse Trials CCI **** (England)
- 1st Brigstock

1981

- 1st Chesterland Three Day Event (Advanced)

1980

- 1st Essex Three Day Event (Preliminary)
