= Prestige (horse) =

French-bred Thoroughbred racehorse

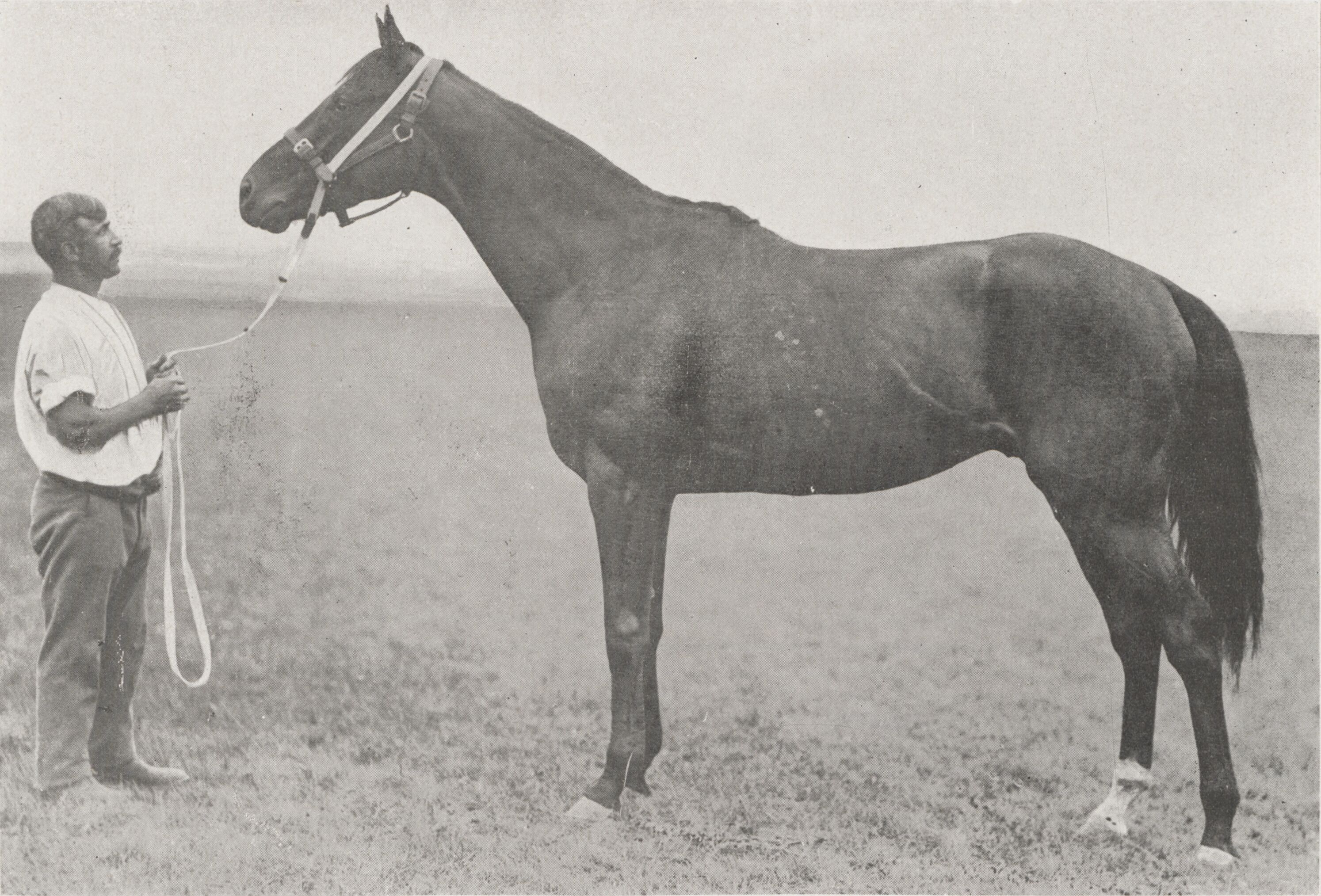
- From Le Sport universel illustré (1906)
- Sire: Le Pompon
- Grandsire: Fripon
- Dam: Orgueilleuse
- Damsire: Reverend
- Sex: Stallion
- Foaled: 1903
- Country: France
- Colour: Bay
- Breeder: Jules Ravaut
- Owner: William K. Vanderbilt
- Trainer: William B. Duke
- Record: 16: 16-0-0

Major wins
- Omnium de Deux Ans (1905); Prix de Deux Ans (1905); Critérium de Maisons-Laffitte (1905); Grand Critérium (1905); Prix de la Forêt (1905); Prix Eugène Adam (1906); Prix d'Hédouville (1906); Prix Biennal (1906)

Awards
- Leading sire in France (1914)

Prestige (1903 – after 1923) was an undefeated French Thoroughbred racehorse who won all his 16 races and became a successful sire.

He was the dominant two-year-old in France in 1905, winning all seven of his races including the Omnium de Deux Ans, Prix de Deux Ans, Critérium de Maisons-Laffitte, Grand Critérium and Prix de la Forêt. His opportunities in the following year were limited as his entries in many of the major French races were voided by the death of his breeder, but won all nine of his starts including the Prix Eugène Adam, Prix d'Hédouville and Prix Biennal.

== Background ==
Prestige was a bay horse with a white star and a white sock on his right hind leg bred in France by Jules Ravaut. He was the best horse sired by Le Pompon, a successful racehorse whose wins included the Prix de Condé in 1893 and the Prix de Fontainebleau in the following year. Prestige's dam Orgueilleuse was a granddaughter of the British broodmare Freia, whose other descendants have included Dunaden, Blue Wind and Bollin Eric. When Ravaut died, the colt entered the ownership of the American William K. Vanderbilt and was sent into training with William B. Duke in France. Prestige was described as an "average-sized" horse with a "light and flexible" action.

He continued a rarer sire line of Whalebone (via his son Defence) into the 20th century.

== Racing career ==
=== 1905: two-year-old season ===
In August, Prestige won the Prix de Deux Ans, the race now known as the Prix Morny, over 1200 metres at Deauville Racecourse by four lengths and the Omnium de Deux Ans (now the Prix Robert Papin), over the same at Maisons-Laffitte Racecourse. In October he returned to win the Critérium de Maisons-Laffitte over 1200 metres and the Grand Critérium over 1600 metres at Longchamp Racecourse. On his final appearance of the season, Prestige was matched against older horses for the first time and won the Prix de la Forêt over 1400 metres at Chantilly Racecourse. He ended the year with earnings of £6,036.

=== 1906: three-year-old season ===
The death of Prestige's breeder meant that his entries in the 1906 French Classic Races were rendered void. He continued his dominance however, winning all nine of his races. He won the Prix Eugène Adam, the race now known as the Prix Exbury, over 2000 metres at Saint-Cloud Racecourse, and then took the Prix Biennal (Prix Jean Prat) at Longchamp in April. In June he walked over for the Prix d'Hédouville at Saint-Cloud. His six other wins that year included the Prix Lagrange, Prix du Prince de Galles, Prix Seymour and Prix Fould (another walkover). An unnamed source described as "one of the leading trainers in France" said that, had he been eligible to run, Prestige would have won the Grand Prix de Paris by "many lengths".

== Stud record ==
At the end of his racing career, Prestige was retired to stud at Vanderbilt's Haras du Quesnay. In 1913 the stallion was sold to Henri Mauge and moved to the Haras du Val d'Enfer. Prestige was a successful breeding stallion with the best of his progeny being Sardanapale. His other good winners included Le Prodige (Prix Ganay, Prix du Cadran), Quenouille (Prix de Diane), Snob (Withers Stakes), Gloster (Prix Robert Papin), Brume (Prix La Rochette) Nonchaloir (Prix de Barbeville) and Manzanilla (Prix La Rochette). He was the Leading sire in France in 1914.

== Assessment ==
In their book A Century of Champions, based on a modified version of the Timeform system, John Randall and Tony Morris rated Prestige the one hundred and ninety-fifth best racehorse of twentieth century, the fortieth best horse of the century to have been trained in France, and the second best horse foaled in 1903 after Spearmint.

== Sire line tree ==
- Prestige
  - Gloster
  - Sardanapale
    - Menzala
    - Sarmation
    - Dis Donc
      - Oh Say
    - Bahadur
    - Despote
    - Gaurisankar
    - Haroun Al Rachid
    - Cotlogomor
    - Solpido
    - Apelle
      - Cappiello
      - Lafcadio
    - Fiterari
      - Beaumontel
      - Casterari
      - Hutton
      - Michoumy
      - Ravioli
    - Rhesus
    - Akenaton
    - Balmoral
    - Sardaneza
    - Charlemagne
    - Onafrasimus
    - Ageratum
    - Le Grand Cyrus
    - Kant
  - Le Prodige
  - Nonchaloir
  - Snob
    - Clock Tower

== Pedigree ==
Pedigree of Prestige (FR), bay stallion, 1903
Sire Le Pompon (FR) 1891	Fripon (FR); 1883	Consul	Monarque
Sire Le Pompon (FR) 1891	Fripon (FR); 1883	Consul	Lady Lift
Sire Le Pompon (FR) 1891	Fripon (FR); 1883	Folle Avoine	Favonius
Sire Le Pompon (FR) 1891	Fripon (FR); 1883	Folle Avoine	Albani
Sire Le Pompon (FR) 1891	La Foudre (FR); 1886	Scottish Chief	Lord of the Isles
Sire Le Pompon (FR) 1891	La Foudre (FR); 1886	Scottish Chief	Miss Ann
Sire Le Pompon (FR) 1891	La Foudre (FR); 1886	La Noue	Le Petit Caporal
Sire Le Pompon (FR) 1891	La Foudre (FR); 1886	La Noue	Gertrude
Dam Orgueilleuse (FR) 1894	Reverend (FR); 1888	Energy	Sterling
Dam Orgueilleuse (FR) 1894	Reverend (FR); 1888	Energy	Cherry Duchess
Dam Orgueilleuse (FR) 1894	Reverend (FR); 1888	Reveuse	Perplexe
Dam Orgueilleuse (FR) 1894	Reverend (FR); 1888	Reveuse	Reverie
Dam Orgueilleuse (FR) 1894	Oroya (GB); 1888	Bend Or	Doncaster
Dam Orgueilleuse (FR) 1894	Oroya (GB); 1888	Bend Or	Rouge Rose
Dam Orgueilleuse (FR) 1894	Oroya (GB); 1888	Freia	Hermit
Dam Orgueilleuse (FR) 1894	Oroya (GB); 1888	Freia	Thor's Day (Family:4-d)
