= Leading sire in France =

The list below shows the leading Thoroughbred sire of racehorses in France for each year since 1887. This is determined by the amount of prize money won by the sire's progeny during the season. Due to the huge prize money of the Prix de l'Arc de Triomphe, the sire of the winner of that race typically wins the title of the Leading Sire in France. The 2016 novel Mount! by Jilly Cooper describes the process to gain the fictional title for global leading sire.

- 1887 - Hermit (1)
- 1888 - Le Destrier (1)
- 1889 - Saxifrage (1)
- 1890 - Atlantic (1)
- 1891 - Energy (1)
- 1892 - Energy (2)
- 1893 - Perplexe (1)
- 1894 - The Bard (1)
- 1895 - Le Sancy (1)
- 1896 - Clover (1)
- 1897 - Le Sancy (2)
- 1898 - Cambyse (1)
- 1899 - War Dance (1)
- 1900 - Le Sancy (3)
- 1901 - The Bard (2)
- 1902 - Omnium II (1)
- 1903 - Le Sancy (4)
- 1904 - Flying Fox (1)
- 1905 - Flying Fox (2)
- 1906 - Le Sagittaire (1)
- 1907 - Perth (1)
- 1908 - Perth (2)
- 1909 - Rabelais (1)
- 1910 - Simonian (1)
- 1911 - Perth (3)
- 1912 - Simonian (2)
- 1913 - Flying Fox (3)
- 1914 - Prestige (1)
- 1915 -
- 1916 - Sans Souci (1)
- 1917 - Maintenon (1)
- 1918 -
- 1919 - Rabelais (2)
- 1920 - Alcantara (1)
- 1921 - Bruleur (1)
- 1922 - Sardanapale (1)
- 1923 - Teddy (1)
- 1924 - Bruleur (2)
- 1925 - Sans Souci (2)
- 1926 - Rabelais (3)
- 1927 - Sardanapale (2)
- 1928 - Alcantara (2)
- 1929 - Bruleur (3)
- 1930 - Kircubbin (1)
- 1931 - Ksar (1)
- 1932 - Massine (1)
- 1933 - Apelle (1)
- 1934 - Astérus (1)
- 1935 - Blandford (1)
- 1936 - Fiterari (1)
- 1937 - Mon Talisman (1)
- 1938 - Bubbles (1)
- 1939 - Pharos (1)
- 1940 - Tourbillon (1)
- 1941 - Biribi (1)
- 1942 - Tourbillon (2)
- 1943 - Pinceau (1)
- 1944 - Pharis (1)
- 1945 - Tourbillon (3)
- 1946 - Prince Rose (1)
- 1947 - Goya II (1)
- 1948 - Goya II (2)
- 1949 - Djebel (1)
- 1950 - Deux Pour Cent (1)
- 1951 - Prince Bio (1)
- 1952 - Fair Copy (1)
- 1953 - Sayani (1)
- 1954 - Sunny Boy (1)
- 1955 - Admiral Drake (1)
- 1956 - Djebel (2)
- 1957 - Tifinar (1)
- 1958 - Vieux Manoir (1)
- 1959 - Vandale (1)
- 1960 - Prince Chevalier (1)
- 1961 - Wild Risk (1)
- 1962 - Tantieme (1)
- 1963 - Le Haar (1)
- 1964 - Wild Risk (2)
- 1965 - Tantieme (2)
- 1966 - Sicambre (1)
- 1967 - Prince Taj (1)
- 1968 - Prince Taj (2)
- 1969 - Snob (1)
- 1970 - Sheshoon (1)
- 1971 - Traffic (1)
- 1972 - Sanctus (1)
- 1973 - Val de Loir (1)
- 1974 - Val de Loir (2)
- 1975 - Val de Loir (3)
- 1976 - Luthier (1)
- 1977 - Caro (1)
- 1978 - Lyphard (1)
- 1979 - Lyphard (2)
- 1980 - Riverman (1)
- 1981 - Riverman (2)
- 1982 - Luthier (2)
- 1983 - Luthier (3)
- 1984 - Luthier (4)
- 1985 - Crystal Palace (1)
- 1986 - Arctic Tern (1)
- 1987 - Nureyev (1)
- 1988 - Kenmare (1)
- 1989 - Kenmare (2)
- 1990 - Saint Cyrien (1)
- 1991 - Green Dancer (1)
- 1992 - Fabulous Dancer (1)
- 1993 - Sadler's Wells (1)
- 1994 - Sadler's Wells (2)
- 1995 - Highest Honor (1)
- 1996 - Fairy King (1)
- 1997 - Nureyev (1)
- 1998 - Linamix (1)
- 1999 - Sadler's Wells (3)
- 2000 - Highest Honor (2)
- 2001 - Danehill (1)
- 2002 - Highest Honor (3)
- 2003 - Darshaan (1)
- 2004 - Linamix (2)
- 2005 - Montjeu (1)
- 2006 - Dansili (1)
- 2007 - Danehill (2)
- 2008 - Zamindar (1)
- 2009 - Cape Cross (1)
- 2010 - King's Best (1)
- 2011 - Lomitas (1)
- 2012 - Poliglote (1)
- 2013 - Motivator (1)
- 2014 - Dansili (2)
- 2015 - Dubawi (1)
- 2016 - Galileo (1)
- 2017 - Nathaniel (1)
- 2018 - Nathaniel (2)
- 2019 - Galileo (2)
- 2020 - Siyouni (1)
- 2021 - Siyouni (2)
- 2022 - Frankel (1)
- 2023 - Cracksman (1)

== See also ==
- Leading sire in Australia
- Leading sire in Germany
- Leading sire in Great Britain & Ireland
- Leading sire in Japan
- Leading broodmare sire in Japan
- Leading sire in North America
- Leading broodmare sire in Great Britain & Ireland
- Leading broodmare sire in North America
