= Gay Crusader =

British thoroughbred racehorse

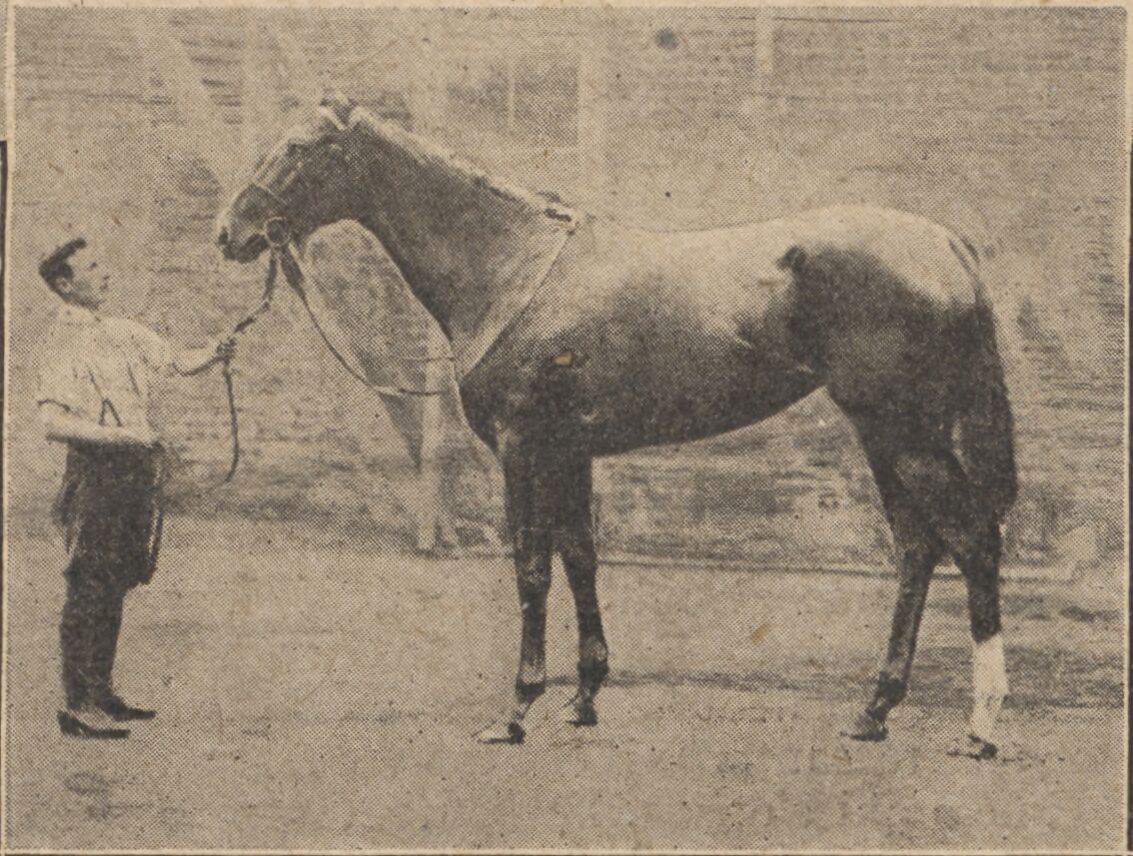
- Gay Crusader, 1917
- Sire: Bayardo
- Grandsire: Bay Ronald
- Dam: Gay Laura
- Damsire: Beppo
- Sex: Stallion
- Foaled: 1914
- Country: United Kingdom of Great Britain and Ireland
- Colour: Bay
- Breeder: Alfred W Cox
- Owner: Alfred W Cox
- Trainer: Alec Taylor, Jr.
- Record: 10: 8-1-0
- Earnings: £11,246

Major wins
- Criterion Stakes (1916); 2,000 Guineas (1917)); New Derby Stakes (1917); September Stakes (1917); Newmarket Gold Cup (1917); Champion Stakes (1917)

Awards
- 12th UK Triple Crown Champion (1917)

Honours
- Name given to LNER A1 No.4477
- Last updated on 30 July 2023

Gay Crusader (1914–14 September 1932) was a British Thoroughbred racehorse and sire who won a wartime version of the English Triple Crown in 1917. In a career which lasted from September 1916 to October 1917 he ran ten times and won eight races, including his last seven in succession. In addition to his three Classic wins he defeated older horses in the Newmarket Gold Cup and the Champion Stakes. Because of wartime restrictions, all of his races were at Newmarket Racecourse. After being injured in training in 1918 he was retired to stud, where his record was disappointing.

== Background ==
Gay Crusader was a bay horse of "beautiful quality" bred by his owner Alfred W Cox, who used the name "Mr Fairie" for his racing interests. He was sired by Cox's stallion Bayardo, regarded as the best British racehorse of his time, and was the first foal of the mare Gay Laura, a daughter of Galeottia, who had won the 1000 Guineas for Cox in 1895. Gay Laura won a race as a two-year-old and was the dam of five other winners that won 14 races worth £9,906. The most notable of these was the successful Steeplechaser Sea Rover. Cox sent the colt into training with Alec Taylor, Jr. at Manton, Wiltshire

== Racing career ==
=== 1916: two-year-old season ===
Gay Crusader was a small and weak yearling and early in his two-year-old season his progress was delayed by sore shins. It was autumn before he appeared on a racecourse when he ran in the Clearwell Stakes at Newmarket and finished sixth of the twelve runners. Despite this performance he was moved up in class for the Criterion Stakes over the same course in October. He was not strongly fancied, but won the race in a close finish by a head from the filly Molly Desmond.

=== 1917: three-year-old season ===
The First World War led to a restricted and restructured racing schedule from 1915 to 1918, with many racecourses, including Epsom, Ascot and Doncaster being used by the military or closed to conserve resources. As many important races could not be run at their usual venues, wartime substitute races were run at alternative courses, with Newmarket being particularly favoured.

By his three-year-old, Gay Crusader had matured into a handsome colt with a calm temperament which made him easy to train. On his debut he carried 136 pounds in the Column Produce Stakes at Newmarket in April. Running on very soft ground he finished second to Coq d'Or, who was carrying eleven pounds less. Before the 2000 Guineas he performed impressively in a private trial race and in the Classic he started 9/4 favourite in a field of fourteen runners. The Taylor stable had another leading contender in Magpie, and the relative merits of the two Manton colts were unclear, as Cox had refused to allow them to gallop together. The closing stages of the race developed into a match between the stable companions and Gay Crusader, under a strong ride from Steve Donoghue prevailed by a head from Magpie and Otto Madden. Magpie was later exported to Australia where he won the Caulfield Stakes.

Wartime restrictions became more severe in the summer of 1917 and for some time it seemed unlikely that a substitute Derby would be run. The "New Derby" was finally organised and took place at Newmarket on 31 July, two months later than the customary date. The race carried prize money of only £2,050 and attracted only a handful of spectators on a dull and rainy day. Ridden again by Donoghue, Gay Crusader started the 7/4 favourite against eleven opponents. Before the race Gay Crusader impressed observers with his condition and physique, and looked to be "the aristocrat of the party." Invincible took the early lead and made the running until half a mile from the finish when Dark Legend moved to the front. The favourite had some problems obtaining a run as he was boxed in against the rails at a crucial stage, but once clear he quickly took the lead and pulled away to win very easily by four lengths from Dansellon and Dark Legend.

The authorities at Doncaster Racecourse refused to allow the use of the name St. Leger Stakes by other racecourses and so the Newmarket substitute race was known as the September Stakes. Only three horses turned out to contest the race and Gay Crusader started at odds of 2/11. He completed the "Triple Crown" by beating Kingston Black by six lengths, with Dansellon finishing a remote third. Having proved himself by far the best colt of his generation, Gay Crusader was matched against older horses in his next two races. Racing over two and a half miles he won the Newmarket Gold Cup, a substitute race for the Ascot Gold Cup and then moved back down in distance to win the Champion Stakes over a mile and a quarter. On his final start of the year he won the Lowther Stakes over one and three quarter miles. All four of these wins in autumn were achieved very easily.

Gay Crusader's earnings of £10,180 enabled Cox to be the Champion owner and the Champion breeder of the British season.

=== 1918: four-year-old season ===
Gay Crusader was kept in training with a second Gold Cup as his principal objective. Early in the season, Cox insisted on running the horse in a private trial race, despite Taylor's concerns about his fitness. Gay Crusader won the trial impressively but was found to be lame the following day. A tendon injury was diagnosed which proved so serious that Gay Crusader was unable to race again.

== Assessment ==
In their book A Century of Champions, Tony Morris and John Randall rated Gay Crusader a "great" winner of both the 2000 Guineas and the Derby and the thirteenth best British horse of the 20th century. Steve Donoghue regarded Gay Crusader as the best horse he ever rode. A writer in The Field described Gay Crusader as "a great horse and one of the easiest Triple Crown winners of all time".

== Stud record ==
Gay Crusader was retired to stud service at an initial fee of 400 guineas. Shortly after Gay Crusader's retirement, Cox turned down an offer of £100,000 for the horse, an enormous amount at the time from Jack Joel. He sired many winners, but few of note, though he does appear in the pedigree of the outstanding dual Prix be l'Arc de Triomphe winner and three times champion sire of Great Britain and Ireland, Ribot. His progeny included:

- Gay Lothario exported to Australia where he sired 25 stakeswinners that had 80 stakeswins, including Tranquil Star
- Hellespont, second dam of the Derby winner Airborne
- Indolence dam of Prince Rose, sire of American stallion Princequillo.
- Inglesant, won Sussex Stakes
- Kincardine, won St. James's Palace Stakes, sire of Kindergarten
- Loika dam of Djebel, Champion two-year-old in France and was that country's leading sire four times.
- Medieval Knight, Middle Park Stakes

Gay Crusader was euthanised on 14 September 1932 at the age of 18.

== Sire line tree ==
- Gay Crusader
  - Bright Knight
    - Gallant Knight
  - Hurstwood
  - Caissot
    - Intermezzo
      - Imi
        - Imperial
          - Prince Ippi
            - Philipo
  - Gay Lothario
  - Hot Night
  - Kincardine
    - Kindergarten
  - Inglesant
  - Medieval Knight

== Pedigree ==
Pedigree of Gay Crusader (GB), bay stallion, 1914
Sire Bayardo (GB) 1906	Bay Ronald; 1893	Hampton	Lord Clifden
Sire Bayardo (GB) 1906	Bay Ronald; 1893	Hampton	Lady Langden
Sire Bayardo (GB) 1906	Bay Ronald; 1893	Black Duchess	Galliard
Sire Bayardo (GB) 1906	Bay Ronald; 1893	Black Duchess	Black Corrie
Sire Bayardo (GB) 1906	Galicia; 1898	Galopin*	Vedette*
Sire Bayardo (GB) 1906	Galicia; 1898	Galopin*	Flying Duchess*
Sire Bayardo (GB) 1906	Galicia; 1898	Isoletta	Isonomy
Sire Bayardo (GB) 1906	Galicia; 1898	Isoletta	Lady Muncastet
Dam Gay Laura (GB) 1909	Beppo; 1903	Marco	Barcaldine
Dam Gay Laura (GB) 1909	Beppo; 1903	Marco	Novitiate
Dam Gay Laura (GB) 1909	Beppo; 1903	Pitti	St Frusquin
Dam Gay Laura (GB) 1909	Beppo; 1903	Pitti	Florence
Dam Gay Laura (GB) 1909	Galeottia; 1892	Galopin*	Vedette*
Dam Gay Laura (GB) 1909	Galeottia; 1892	Galopin*	Flying Duchess*
Dam Gay Laura (GB) 1909	Galeottia; 1892	Agave	Springfield
Dam Gay Laura (GB) 1909	Galeottia; 1892	Agave	Wood Anemone (Family: 1-g)

* Gay Crusader is inbred 3S x 3D to the stallion Galopin, meaning that he appears third generation on the sire side of his pedigree, and third generation on the dam side of his pedigree.
