= Teddy (horse) =

French-bred Thoroughbred racehorse

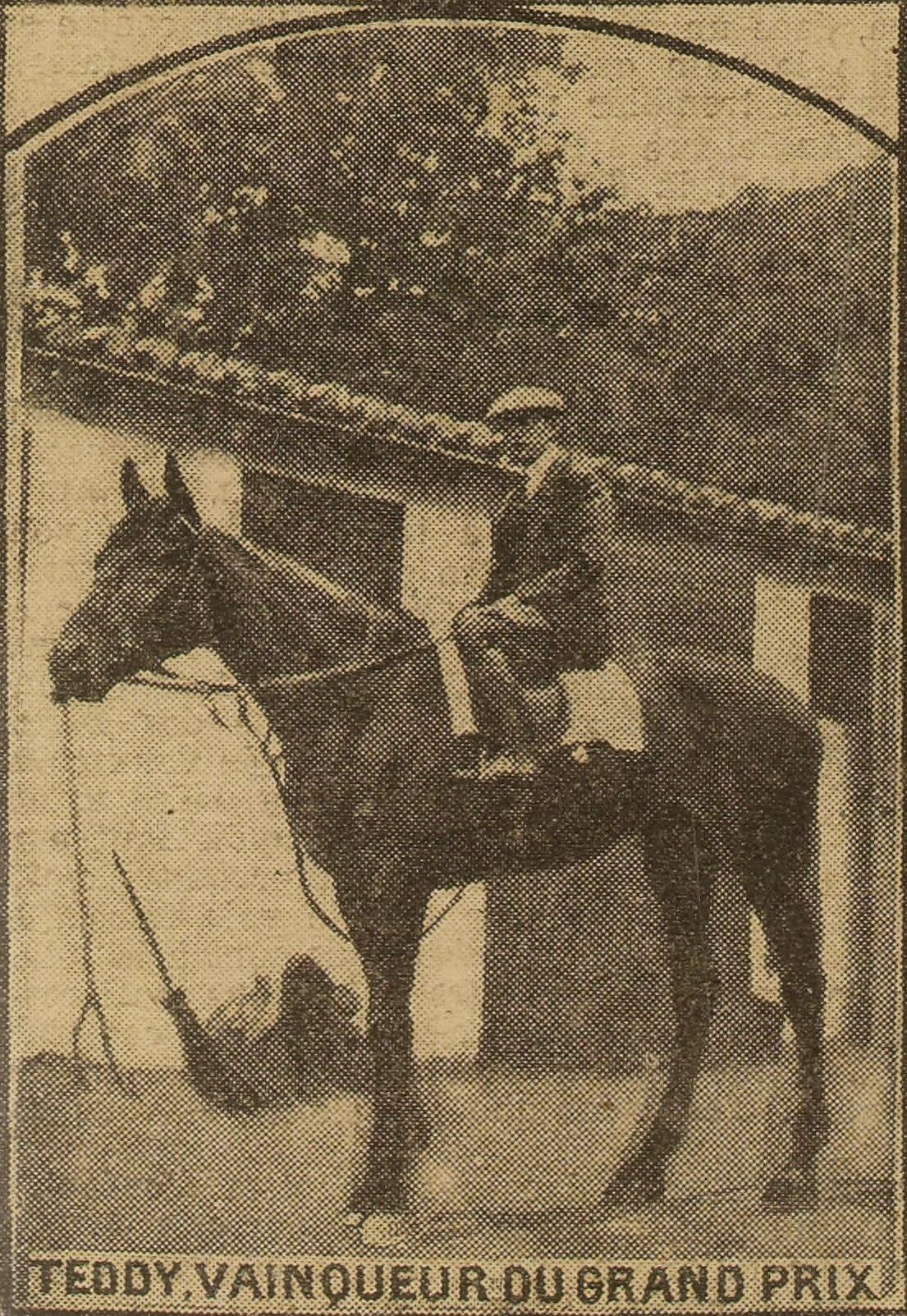
- Gran Premio San Sebastian (2 July 1916)
- Sire: Ajax
- Grandsire: Flying Fox
- Dam: Rondeau
- Damsire: Bay Ronald
- Sex: Stallion
- Foaled: 1913
- Country: France
- Colour: Bay
- Breeder: Edmond Blanc
- Owner: Jefferson Davis Cohn, F. Wallis Armstrong, and Kenneth Gilpin
- Trainer: Robert Denman
- Record: 8: 6–0–2

Major wins
- Gran Premio San Sebastian; Premio Villamejor (Spanish St. Leger); Prix Darbonnay; Prix Darney; Prix des Trois Ans (1916); Prix des Sablonieres

Awards
- Champion three-year-old colt in Spain (1916); Leading sire in France (1923)
- Last updated on December 5, 2007

Teddy (1913–1936) was a French racehorse and an influential sire, especially for lines in Italy, France, and the United States. He is considered one of the most influential sires in the 20th century.

== Racing career ==
Teddy was sold to captain Jefferson Davis Cohn, godson of American Civil War Confederate president Jefferson Davis, for 5,400 francs. His racing career was limited partly due to World War I, which erupted when he was a yearling. He was shipped to the San Sebastian racecourse in Spain, where he began to race as a three-year-old, winning 5 of his 7 starts. His record in Spain included a win at his maiden race, the Gran Premio San Sebastian (2400 meters), a win at the "Spanish St. Leger" Premio Villamejor (2800 meters), and a third-place finish in the Copa d'Oro del Re (2400 meters). In France, he won the Prix Darbonnay (1700 meters) plus the Prix Darney and Prix des Trois Ans (2400 meters) within 8 days of each other. He also finished third in the Prix d'Elevage. He had one race as a four-year-old, the Prix des Sablonieres (2400 meters), which he won to retire with a record of 6 wins in 8 starts.

== Stud record ==
Teddy began his breeding career in France in 1918, where he stood at Haras de Fitz-James and Haras du Bois-Roussel in Alençon, Orne. In France, he was Leading Sire in 1923, and was in the top three in 1925, 1926, 1928, 1929, and 1932. His success as a sire led to his importation into the United States in 1931 by F. Wallis Armstrong and Kenneth Gilpin. There, he stood at Kentmere Farm in Virginia until his death in 1936, at the age of 24, due to a twisted intestine. Teddy sired 65 stakes winners.

Notable progeny in France include:

- Marguerite de Valois: 1919 filly out of Plucky Liege (by Spearmint), who placed in stakes races and was then sold to the United States. Found in the pedigrees of Fappiano, Ogygian, and Quiet American.
- Lady Elinor: 1919 filly and stakes winner, dam of Vatellor
- Sir Gallahad III: 1920 colt out of Plucky Liege (by Spearmint), won 12 out of 25 starts including the Poule d'Essai des Poulains (French 2,000 Guineas). Was U.S. Leading broodmare sire in North America a record 12 times, sired Gallant Fox.
- Anna Bolena: 1920 filly out of Queen Elizabeth II (by Wargrave), winner of the Poule d'Essai des Pouliches (French 1,000 Guineas), dam of Mary Tudor (who was dam of Ascot Gold Cup-winner Owen Tudor)
- Asterus: b. 1923 colt out of Astrella (by Verdun), won 6 races including the Poule d'Essai des Poulains. Champion Stakes, and Royal Hunt Cup. 2nd Leading Sire in 1933, Leading Broodmare Sire in 1943, 1944, 1945, 1946, 1947 and 1948.
- Coeur A Coeur: 1921 ch. filly, granddam to Djebel
- Brumeux: 1925 b. colt out of La Brume (by Alcantara II), winner of 6 out of 22 starts including the Prix Edgard Gillois (2600 meters), Newbury Autumn Cup (17 f.), and Jockey Club Cup (18 f.). Sired Borealis (winner of the Coronation Cup), Herero (German Derby winner), Cardington King (St. Leger), and Early Mist (winner of the Grand National).
- La Troienne: b. 1926 filly who became one of the most influential broodmares in the United States
- Rose of England: br. 1927 filly out of Perce-Neige (by Neil Gow), winner of the 1930 English Oaks. Had 10 foals, with 4 stakes winners, including St. Leger winner Chulmleigh.
- Bull Dog: 1927 b. colt out of Plucky Liege (by Spearmint, Leading Sire in 1943 and Leading Broodmare Sire in 1953, 1954, 1956. Sired 52 stakes winners, broodmare sire of more than 85 stakes winners. He also sired the stallion Bull Lea, a hugely influential American sire.
- Quatre Bras: b. 1928 colt out of Plucky Liege (by Spearmint), record of 41-9-12-6
- Betty: 1930 filly, winner of the Coronation Stakes
- Assignation: 1930 filly out of Cinq a Sept (by Roi Herode), 4th dam of Secretariat, in pedigree of Alleged.

Other notable progeny include:

- Ortello: Italian-bred 1926 ch. colt out of Hollebeck by Gorgos. Record of 16 wins in 19 starts, including the Prix de l'Arc de Triomphe, and was Leading Sire in Italy 1937, 1939, 1940, 1941, 1942, and 1944 with many notable offspring.
- Sun Teddy: American-bred 1933 ch. colt out of Sunmelia (by Sun Briar), won the Arlington Handicap & Saranac Handicap, produced 6 stakes winners in his 6-year breeding career. Grandsire of Damascus
- Case Ace: American-bred 1934 b. colt out of Sweetheart (by Ultimus), won 6 out of 9 starts. Sired Ace Card (1952 Broodmare of the Year), Pavot, the 1944 American Champion Two-Year-Old Colt and 1945 Belmont Stakes winner, and the filly Raise You (dam of Raise a Native).

Teddy's sire line continued mainly through his sons Sir Gallahad and Sun Teddy (through Damascus).

== Pedigree ==
Pedigree of Teddy, bay stallion, 1913
Sire Ajax b. 1901	Flying Fox b. 1896	Orme b. 1889	Ormonde
Sire Ajax b. 1901	Flying Fox b. 1896	Orme b. 1889	Angelica
Sire Ajax b. 1901	Flying Fox b. 1896	Vampire br. 1889	Galopin
Sire Ajax b. 1901	Flying Fox b. 1896	Vampire br. 1889	Irony
Sire Ajax b. 1901	Amie b. 1893	Clamart ch. 1888	Saumur
Sire Ajax b. 1901	Amie b. 1893	Clamart ch. 1888	Princess Catherine
Sire Ajax b. 1901	Amie b. 1893	Alice b./br. 1887	Wellingtonia
Sire Ajax b. 1901	Amie b. 1893	Alice b./br. 1887	Asta
Dam Rondeau b. 1900	Bay Ronald b. 1893	Hampton b. 1872	Lord Clifden
Dam Rondeau b. 1900	Bay Ronald b. 1893	Hampton b. 1872	Lady Langden
Dam Rondeau b. 1900	Bay Ronald b. 1893	Black Duchess br. 1886	Galliard
Dam Rondeau b. 1900	Bay Ronald b. 1893	Black Duchess br. 1886	Black Corrie
Dam Rondeau b. 1900	Doremi ch. 1894	Bend Or ch. 1877	Doncaster
Dam Rondeau b. 1900	Doremi ch. 1894	Bend Or ch. 1877	Rouge Rose
Dam Rondeau b. 1900	Doremi ch. 1894	Lady Emily b. 1879	Macaroni
Dam Rondeau b. 1900	Doremi ch. 1894	Lady Emily b. 1879	May Queen

Note: b. = Bay, br. = Brown, ch. = Chestnut
