= Durbar (horse) =

French-bred Thoroughbred racehorse

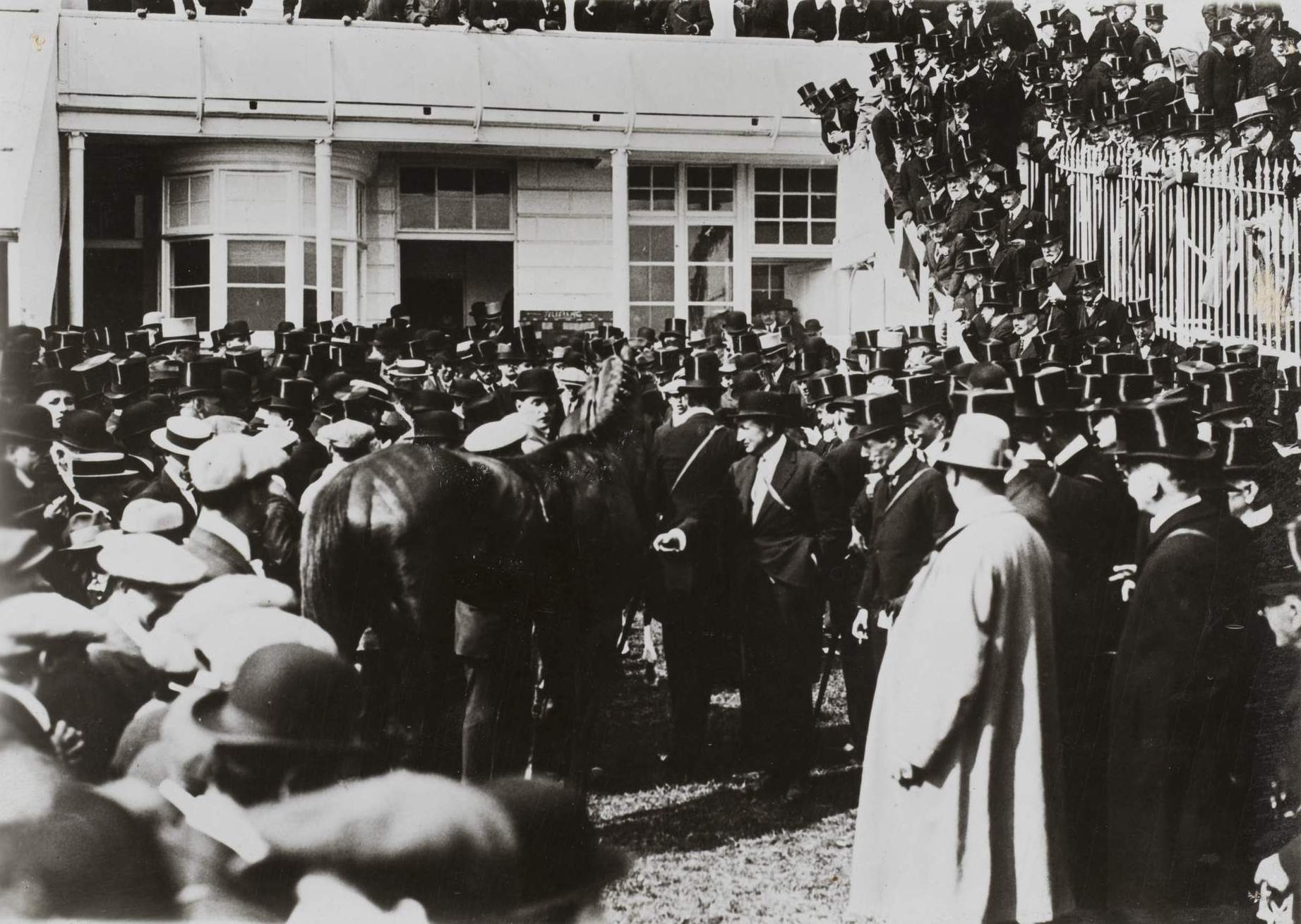
- Durbar returns to France after winning the Epsom Derby.
- Sire: Rabelais
- Grandsire: St. Simon
- Dam: Armenia
- Damsire: Meddler
- Sex: Stallion
- Foaled: 1911
- Country: France
- Colour: Bay
- Breeder: Herman B. Duryea
- Owner: Herman B. Duryea
- Trainer: Tom Murphy
- Record: 13: 5-1-2
- Earnings: £

Major wins
- Prix de Saint-Cloud (1914); Prix Biennale (1914); Prix Noailles (1914); Epsom Derby (1914)

Durbar (known in England and the United States as Durbar II) was a French racehorse. Although not the best of his generation in France (he was inferior to both Sardanapale and La Farina) he proved too good for the leading British colts in the 1914 Epsom Derby, which he won by three lengths. His pedigree was controversial, with the British authorities not recognising him as a Thoroughbred. His racing career was ended by the outbreak of the First World War.

== Background ==
Durbar, a bay horse standing 15.3 hands high with a white blaze and three white socks, was bred in France by his owner Herman B. Duryea. Duryea had been a prominent owner and breeder of racehorses in New York State, until 1908. In that year, gambling was made illegal in the state by the Hart–Agnew Law, forcing most racetracks to close, and like several of his compatriots Duryea transferred his racing and breeding operations to Europe.

Shortly afterwards and possibly in response to the influx of American horses, the Jockey Club created a new regulation which became known as the Jersey Act, banning horses without proven "pure" descent from foundation mares from being registered in the General Stud Book. Such horses, including many from the most successful American families, were allowed to race but could not be considered Thoroughbreds. Durbar fell foul of the new rule as his dam Armenia descended from an unknown mare.

== Racing career ==
=== 1913: two-year-old season ===
Durbar ran four times in 1913 without success, but showed some promise, twice finishing fourth and running third in the Prix Prestige on his final start.

=== 1914: three-year-old season ===
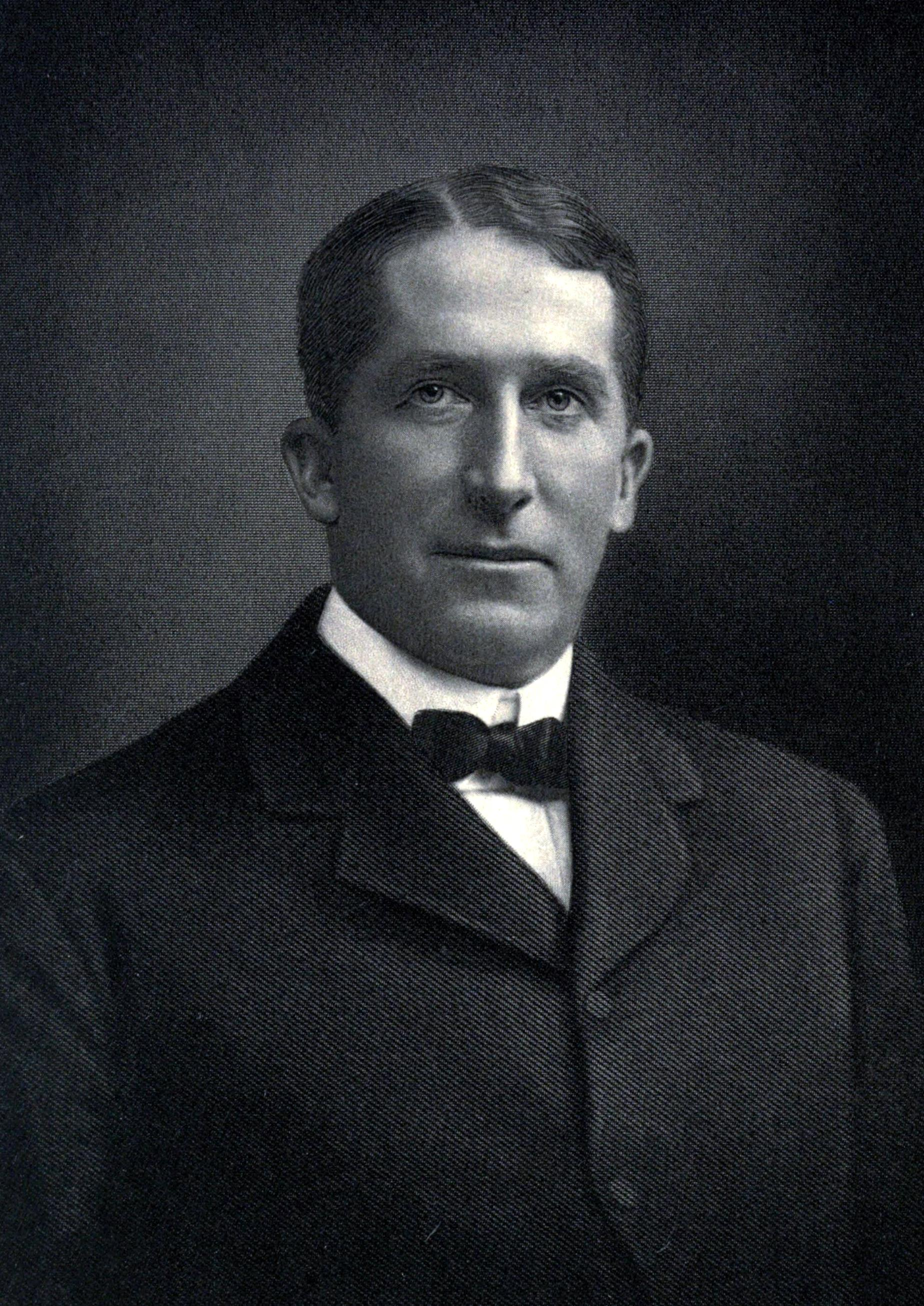
Herman B Duryea, Durbar's owner and breeder

Durbar was extremely active in the spring of 1914, running six times in France before being sent to Epsom. Running over 2000m he won his first two races before he was stepped up in class to run second to Sardanapale in the Prix Lagrange. He won the Prix Biennale on his next start and was then moved up to 2400m to record his most important French victory in the Prix Noailles. He was brought back in trip for the Poule d'Essai des Poulains over 1600m at Longchamp but was unable to recover from a poor start and finished unplaced.

At Epsom he started at 20/1 against thirty opponents, one of the largest fields ever assembled for the race. A possible explanation for the size of the field was that an unusually large numbers of "forlorn hopes" were starting in the race in order to collect money on sweepstakes tickets. A year after the "suffragette Derby" of 1913 the race was marked by another incident in which a campaigner for women's suffrage, named as Ada Rice was arrested after firing a starting pistol at a policeman. The start of the race was delayed for more than twenty minutes as the starter struggled to control the runners leading the favourite, Kennymore, the winner of the 2000 Guineas to become increasingly fractious, lashing out with his hooves and attempting to attack other horses. Once the field was underway Durbar, ridden by the French-based American Matt McGee, was always prominent, led soon after halfway, and won easily by three lengths. He was followed home by two other outsiders, Hapsburg and Peter the Hermit in a result which left the huge crowd stunned into silence. Although the colt had been bred and trained in France his owner's nationality meant that his win was greeted as an American victory in the United States.

Following his Epsom win, Durbar was returned to France for his next two races which confirmed the impression that he was a good colt, but some way behind the very best French horses. He finished fourth behind Sardanapale in the Prix du Jockey Club at Chantilly and third behind the same colt and La Farina in the Grand Prix de Paris at Longchamp. On the same day that the Grand Prix was run the assassination of Archduke Franz Ferdinand of Austria began the sequence of events which led to the outbreak of the First World War. Horse racing in France was suspended and Durbar never ran again.

His safe evacuation from the Paris area to Normandy was in part due to the actions of his African American groom, who reportedly wrapped the horse in an American flag with a notice reading,

This is Durbar II, the English Derby winner. He is neutral

== Assessment ==
In their book A Century of Champions, John Randall and Tony Morris rated Durbar an "average" Derby winner, but one who was some way behind both Sardanapale and La Farina.

== Stud career ==
Durbar first stood as a stallion at his owner's Haras du Gazon at Neuvy-au-Houlme in Normandy, France. In 1924 he was sent to America to stand at the Claiborne Farm stud at Paris, Kentucky. In 1931 he was moved again, this time to the Prospect Hill Stud at Bel Air, Maryland, but died before the start of the breeding season. His best European runners included Rebia (Poule d'Essai des Pouliches), Durban (Prix Vermeille) and Scaramouche (Prix de la Forêt). He was less successful after his move to the United States.

== Sire line tree ==
- Durbar
  - Scaramouche
    - Pantalon
      - Talon
  - Altay
  - Xander
  - Bathorse
  - Indian Salute

== Pedigree ==
Pedigree of Durbar (FR), bay stallion, 1911
Sire Rabelais (IRE) 1900	St Simon; 1881	Galopin	Vedette
Sire Rabelais (IRE) 1900	St Simon; 1881	Galopin	Flying Duchess
Sire Rabelais (IRE) 1900	St Simon; 1881	St Angela	King Tom
Sire Rabelais (IRE) 1900	St Simon; 1881	St Angela	Adeline
Sire Rabelais (IRE) 1900	Satirical; 1891	Satiety	Isonomy
Sire Rabelais (IRE) 1900	Satirical; 1891	Satiety	Wifey
Sire Rabelais (IRE) 1900	Satirical; 1891	Chaff	Wild Oats
Sire Rabelais (IRE) 1900	Satirical; 1891	Chaff	Celerrima
Dam Armenia (USA) 1901	Meddler; 1890	St Gatien	The Rover
Dam Armenia (USA) 1901	Meddler; 1890	St Gatien	St Editha
Dam Armenia (USA) 1901	Meddler; 1890	Busybody	Petrarch
Dam Armenia (USA) 1901	Meddler; 1890	Busybody	Spinaway
Dam Armenia (USA) 1901	Urania; 1892	Hanover	Hindoo
Dam Armenia (USA) 1901	Urania; 1892	Hanover	Bourbon Belle
Dam Armenia (USA) 1901	Urania; 1892	Wanda	Mortemer
Dam Armenia (USA) 1901	Urania; 1892	Wanda	Minnie Minor (Family: A4)
