= Coaraze (horse) =

French-bred racehorse and Brazilian sire

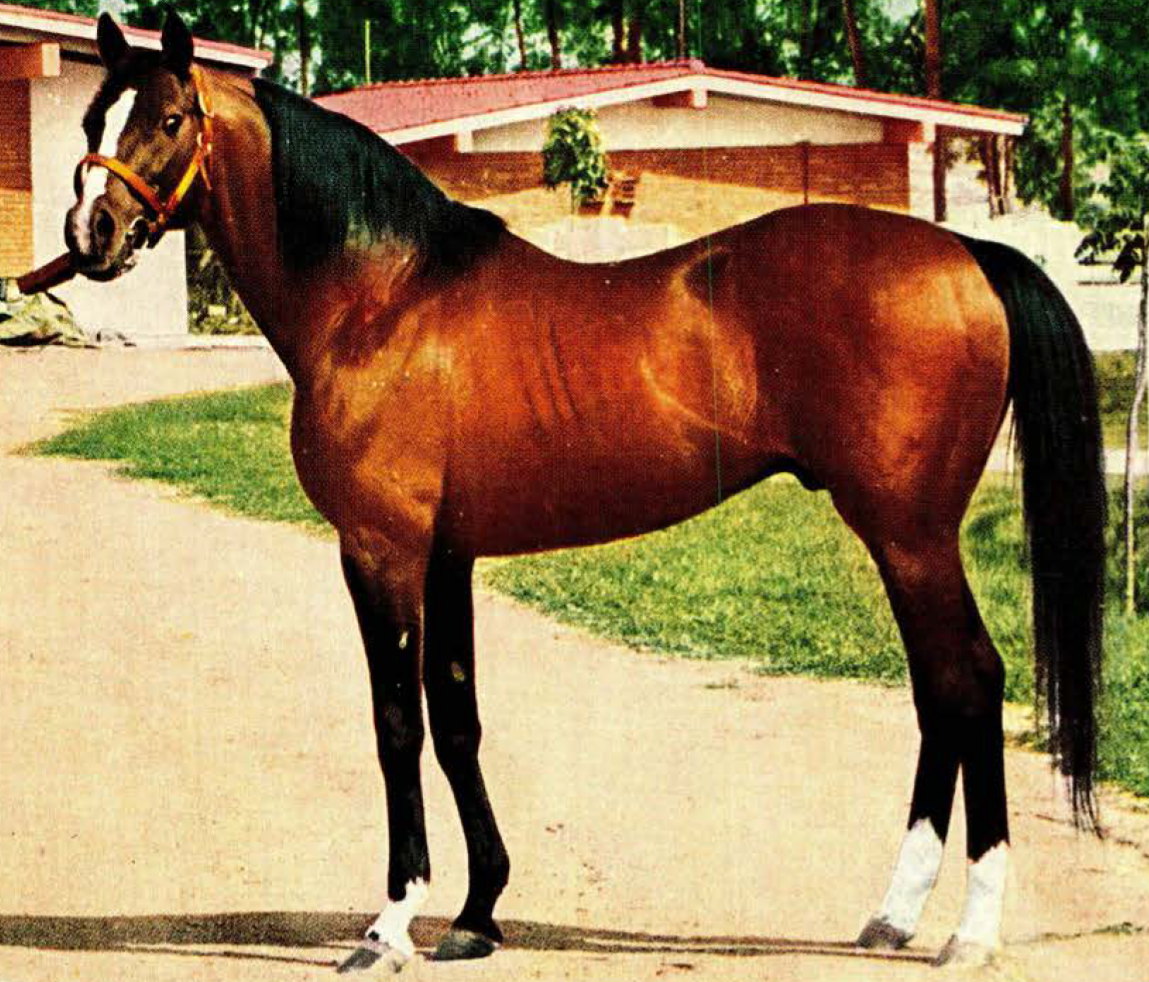
- Coaraze at stud in Brazil
- Sire: Tourbillon
- Grandsire: Ksar
- Dam: Corrida
- Damsire: Coronach
- Sex: Stallion
- Foaled: 1942
- Died: 1970
- Country: France
- Colour: Bay
- Breeder: Marcel Boussac
- Owner: Marcel Boussac; Jockey Club de São Paulo
- Record: 26: 11-1-1

Major wins
- Prix Morny (1944); Prix du Jockey Club (1945); Prix Jacques Le Marois (1945); Prix Daphnis (1945); Prix d'Ispahan (1946, 1947); Grand Prix de Saint-Cloud (1946)

Coaraze (1942-1970) was a French thoroughbred racehorse who was imported into Brazil to stand at stud and there became a noted sire.

== Background ==
Coaraze was bred by Marcel Boussac and foaled in 1942. He was his dam Corrida's only offspring to survive the German occupation of France in World War II.

Coaraze's sire, Tourbillon, also bred by Boussac, was one of the foundation sires for Boussac's breeding program. Tourbillon was successful on the racetrack, winning 5 of 11 races, including the Prix du Jockey Club, Prix Lupin, Prix Greffulhe, and Prix Hocquart, but he primarily earned his fame as a sire. He led the French general sire list in 1940, 1942, and 1945. Tourbillon's notable progeny prior to Coaraze include Goya, winner of the St James's Palace Stakes and Gimcrack Stakes, Djebel, winner of the 2000 Guineas Stakes and Prix de l'Arc de Triomphe, Cillas, winner of the Prix du Jockey Club, Prix Jacques Le Marois, and Prix Greffulhe, and Esmeralda, winner of the Prix Morny, Prix de la Forêt, and Poule d'Essai des Pouliches.

Corrida, Coaraze's dam, was very successful on the racetrack, having won the Prix Morny, Hardwicke Stakes, Grosser Preis von Reichshauptstadt, Grand International d'Ostende twice, and Prix de l'Arc de Triomphe twice, among other victories. Coaraze was her only foal that survived to adulthood.

Coaraze was particularly closely related to Goya, who was Corrida's half-sibling and also sired by Tourbillon.

Coaraze was a bay horse with a blaze and socks on his left front and both hind feet.

== Racing career ==
Coaraze ran from the ages of 2 to 5.

At the age of 2, he won three races, including the Prix Morny.

As a three-year-old, Coaraze raced successfully at a high level, being named the highweight of his division. He won the Prix du Jockey Club, Prix Jacques le Marois, and Prix Daphnis, ran second in the Poule d'Essai des Poulains, and finished fourth in the Grand Prix de Paris and Prix de l'Arc de Triomphe.

Coaraze continued to race successfully as an older horse, winning the Prix d'Ispahan in 1946 and 1947 and the Grand Prix de Saint-Cloud in 1946. He was second in the 1947 Grand Prix de Saint-Cloud, the 1946 and 1947 Great Yorkshire Stakes, and 1947 Coronation Cup.

== Stud career ==
Coaraze was retired to stand stud at Boussac's Haras de Jardy as a six-year-old, in 1948. There, he sired La Mirambule, winner of the Prix Vermeille, and Canthare, winner of the Prix Jacques le Marois.

The year after he entered stud, Coaraze was advertised as being for sale in the Société d'Encouragement because he had sired too many twins in his first crop.

The idea of purchasing Coaraze for Brazilian breeding interests first came about in May 1954, on the suggestion of a representative of Boussac who was visiting the Jockey Club of São Paulo. Comparisons were made to a list of stallions available for sale in France at the time, and it was determined that Coaraze was the best on offer.

José Homem de Mello, President of the Commission of the Jockey Club of São Paulo, made contact with the Société with regards to purchasing Coaraze. The price was high, but affordable. A Brazilian representative and a French veterinarian inspected Coaraze, finding him to be sound and healthy. Coaraze was officially purchased by the Jockey Club of São Paulo for Cr$1,350,000 to stand stud at the Jockey Club of São Paulo's Posto de Monta, the first time the Jockey Club imported a stallion.

Coaraze was exported to Brazil in 1954. He began covering mares in 1955, and his first Brazilian crop was foaled in 1956.

Coaraze stood for a stud fee of Cr$50,000 for the 1960/61 season.

Coaraze was the leading sire in São Paulo in 1962 and second in 1971, and led the São Paulo broodmare sire list in 1971, 1972, 1973, 1974, 1977, 1978, and was third in 1979 and 1981.

Coaraze died in 1970 at the age of 28, with his final crop being born that same year.

=== Notable progeny ===
c = colt, f = filly, g = gelding

Foaled	Name	Sex	Major Wins
1949	La Mirambule	f	Prix Vermeille, Prix de Pomone
1950	Canthare	c	Prix Jacques Le Marois
1956	Xasco	c	Grande Prêmio Antonio Prado
1957	Empyreu	c	Grande Prêmio Ipiranga
1958	Emerson	c	Grande Prêmio Cruzeiro do Sul, Grande Prêmio Derby Paulista, Grande Prêmio Derby Sul-Americano
1959	Coaralde	c	Grande Prêmio Ipiranga, Grande Prêmio Linneo de Paula Machado
1965	Viziane	c	Grande Prêmio Brasil, Grande Prêmio São Paulo, Grande Prêmio Jockey Club de São Paulo, Grande Prêmio Consagração, etc.
1967	Rhone	c	Grande Prêmio Cruzeiro do Sul, Grande Prêmio Estado do Rio de Janeiro, Grande Prêmio Linneo de Paula Machado

== Sire line tree ==
- Coaraze
  - Canthare
  - Xasco
  - Empyreu
  - Emerson
    - Emerilo
    - Rimesault
    - Solicitor
  - Coaralde
  - Viziane
  - Rhone

== Pedigree ==
Pedigree of Coaraze (FR), bay stallion, foaled 1942
Sire Tourbillon (FR) 1928	Ksar (FR); 1918	Bruleur (FR)	Chouberski (FR)
Sire Tourbillon (FR) 1928	Ksar (FR); 1918	Bruleur (FR)	Basse Terre (FR)
Sire Tourbillon (FR) 1928	Ksar (FR); 1918	Kizil Kourgan (FR)	Omnium (FR)
Sire Tourbillon (FR) 1928	Ksar (FR); 1918	Kizil Kourgan (FR)	Kasbah (FR)
Sire Tourbillon (FR) 1928	Durban (FR); 1918	Durbar (FR)	Rabelais (FR)
Sire Tourbillon (FR) 1928	Durban (FR); 1918	Durbar (FR)	Armenia (USA)
Sire Tourbillon (FR) 1928	Durban (FR); 1918	Banshee (FR)	Irish Lad (USA)
Sire Tourbillon (FR) 1928	Durban (FR); 1918	Banshee (FR)	Frizette (USA)
Dam Corrida (FR) 1932	Coronach (GB); 1923	Hurry On (GB)	Marcovil (GB)
Dam Corrida (FR) 1932	Coronach (GB); 1923	Hurry On (GB)	Tout Suite (GB)
Dam Corrida (FR) 1932	Coronach (GB); 1923	Wet Kiss (GB)	Tredennis (GB)
Dam Corrida (FR) 1932	Coronach (GB); 1923	Wet Kiss (GB)	Soligena (GB)
Dam Corrida (FR) 1932	Zariba (FR); 1919	Sardanapale (FR)	Prestige (FR)
Dam Corrida (FR) 1932	Zariba (FR); 1919	Sardanapale (FR)	Gemma (GB)
Dam Corrida (FR) 1932	Zariba (FR); 1919	St. Lucre (GB)	St. Serf (GB)
Dam Corrida (FR) 1932	Zariba (FR); 1919	St. Lucre (GB)	Fairy Gold (GB)
