= Ksar (horse) =

French-bred Thoroughbred racehorse

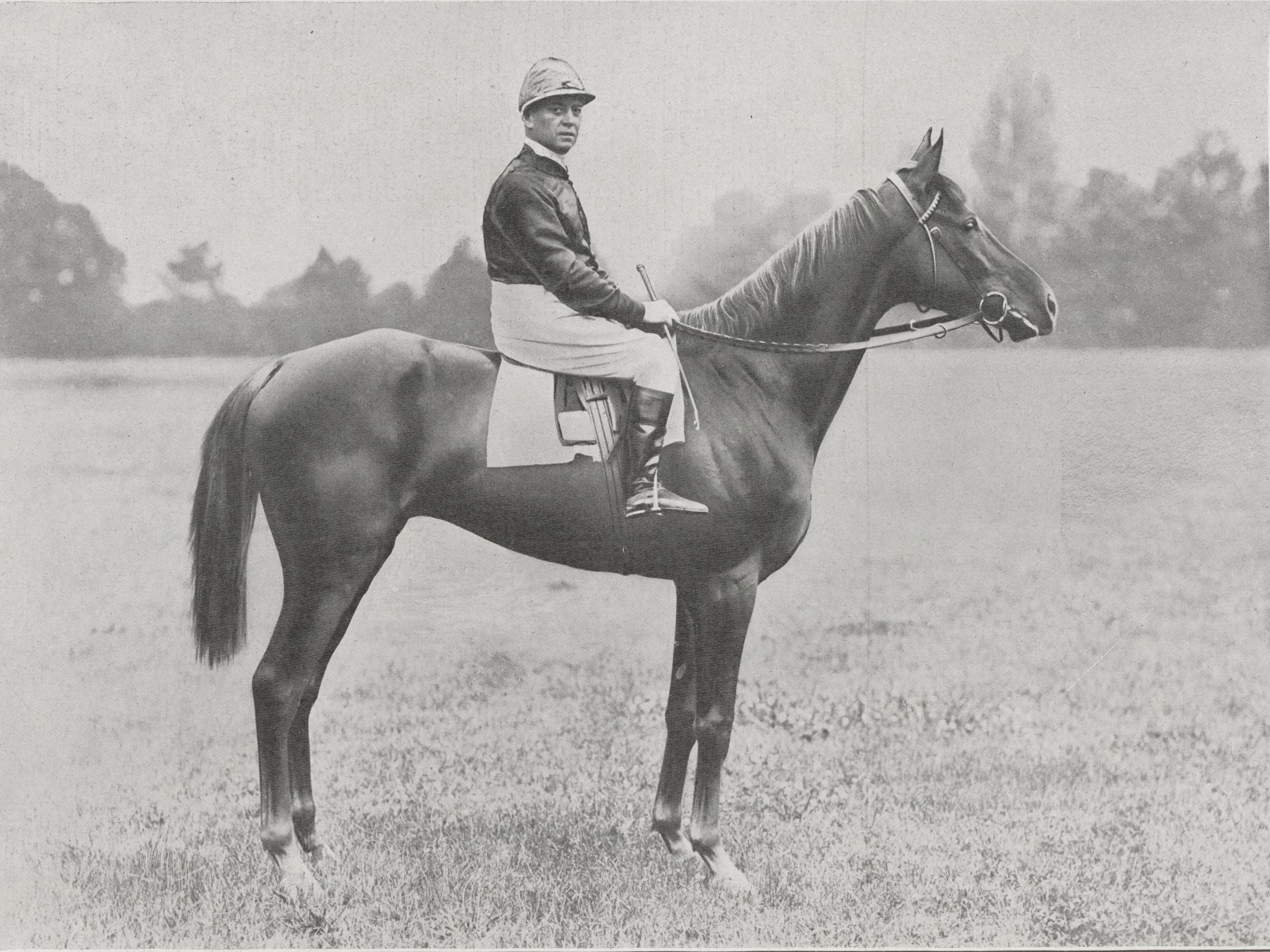
- Ksar, at 1921 Prix de l'Arc de Triomphe
- Sire: Bruleur
- Grandsire: Chouberski
- Dam: Kizil Kourgan
- Damsire: Omnium II
- Sex: Stallion
- Foaled: 1918
- Country: France
- Colour: Chestnut
- Breeder: Evremond de Saint-Alary
- Owner: Madame Edmond Blanc
- Trainer: Walter R. Walton
- Record: 15: 11-3-0
- Earnings: 1,562,025 FF

Major wins
- Prix de la Salamandre (1920); Prix Royal-Oak (1921); Prix Hocquart (1921); Prix du Jockey Club (1921); Prix Lupin (1921); Prix de l'Arc de Triomphe (1921 & 1922); Prix du President de la Republique (1922); Prix du Prince d'Orange (1922); Prix du Cadran (1922); Prix des Sablons (1922)

Awards
- Leading sire in France (1931)
- Last updated on 2 December 2009

Ksar (1918–1937) was a French Thoroughbred racehorse who had back-to-back wins in France's most prestigious horse race, the Prix de l'Arc de Triomphe and was the leading sire in France in 1931.

== Breeding ==
Bred by Evremond de Saint-Alary at his Haras de Saint Pair du Mont in Normandy, Ksar was purchased by the renowned French horseman Edmond Blanc. Ksar was inbred to the French Derby winner, Omnium II (3f x 2f) with this giving him three crosses of Dollar (4f x 5m x 6m). Kizil Kourgan was the winner of the French 1000 Guineas and Oaks, the Grand Prix de Paris and other races. Her first foal was Kenilworth, by Childwick. Kenilworth won the Prix Greffulhe, Prix Rainbow and the marathon four mile (6,400 metres) race, Prix Gladiateur before being exported to Australia and becoming a successful sire. He was a direct male descendant of the famous mid-nineteenth century race horse The Flying Dutchman.

== Racing record ==
Edmond Blanc died in 1920, and his widow raced Ksar, beginning at age two when he won the Prix de la Salamandre at Longchamp Racecourse.

At age three, Ksar was the dominant horse in France, winning five major races, including the coveted Prix du Jockey Club and the first of his two consecutive Prix de l'Arc de Triomphes. He ran poorly in the 1921 Grand Prix de Paris which had previously been won by both Ksar's sire and dam.

Ksar continued his dominance at age four, winning his second Arc and adding the Grand Prix de Saint-Cloud (Prix du President de la Republique). Ksar was retired after his four-year-old racing season with 11 wins and 3 places from his 15 starts.

== Stud record ==
At his owner's Haras de Jardy, stud, Ksar was the leading sire in France in 1931 and an influential sire.

=== Notable progeny includes ===
- Diademe, who won in England and France,
- Le Ksar (2,000 Guineas, stood in England from 1939 to 1943 and then exported to Argentina)
- Maravilla a successful Spanish broodmare.
- Thor II (French Derby, French Gold Cup, second in the Ascot Gold Cup defeating Hyperion).
- Tourbillon (1928), who won the French Derby and contributed to many modern pedigrees
- Ukrania, won Prix de Diane and the
- Ut Majeur (Cesare-witch, etc., sent to Hungary in 1936 after three or four seasons at stud in England);
- Yema (dam of the 2000 Guineas winner Kingsway)

Among Ksar's grandsons are Prix de l'Arc de Triomphe winners Djebel (1942) and Caracalla (1946). Ksar was also the damsire of the 1941 Arc winner and Three-Year-Old Champion Le Pacha.

In 1935, Ksar was sold to American breeding interests and stood at stud at Montana Hall Stud in Virginia, where he produced a number of international show jumping horses until his death in 1937 at age nineteen.

== Sire line tree ==
Ksar descendants (click to expand)
- Ksar
  - Magnat
  - Amfortas
    - One I Love
    - Clodouche
    - Nuageux
      - Minotchehr
    - Pegase
  - Ut Majeur
  - Thor
    - Tariel
      - Tarbrag
      - Taslip
      - Tajo
    - Imperator
    - Ofelus
      - Oferista
  - Muzio
  - Pas Libre
  - Peter the Great
    - Russian Hero
  - Formor
    - Fortina
      - Fortria
      - Bampton Castle
      - Fort Leney
      - Splash
      - Fort Devon
  - Le Ksar
  - Malkowicze
  - Zurs
    - Sampiera
  - Castel Fusano
  - Ksar of Audley
  - Wire-tapper
  - Tourbillon
    - Serdab
    - Goya
      - Goyama
        - Gombar
        - Patras
        - Tenareze
        - Vittor Pasani
        - Sourire
      - Nirgal
        - Nail
      - Dariel
      - Giafar
        - Marion Island
      - Oman
        - Dusky Oman
        - Impresario
      - Sandjar
        - Jardiniere
        - Ogan
        - Eylau
      - Goyaz
        - Obagoy
        - Gyn
        - Rapaz
        - Sultan El Yago
        - Damasco
      - Good Luck
      - L'Aiglon
      - Goma
      - Orbaneja
        - Major's Dilemma
      - Pintor
      - Arrogate
      - Artismo
      - Goyamo
    - Marcius
    - Cillas
    - Gaspillage
    - Last Post
      - Kobus
    - Adaris
      - Burning Flame
    - Billy of Spain
    - Meridien
      - Manitou
      - Medium
        - Master Boing
        - Misti
      - Sphinx
    - Djebel
      - Arbar
        - Abdos
        - Arcor
      - Clarion
        - Klairon
        - Rumesnil
        - Pantene
        - Net
        - Le Francais
      - Djelal
      - Le Lavandou
        - Le Levanstell
      - Le Roitelet
      - Damnos
      - Dernah
      - Djebe
        - Blast
        - Joy
      - Djebelilla
        - Dyur
      - Djeddah
        - Midsummer Night
      - Djefou
        - Rapace
        - Le Sanglier
        - Puissant Chef
        - Courroux
      - My Babu
        - Better Boy
        - Eubulides
        - Our Babu
        - Babur
        - Dionisio
        - Milesian
        - King Babar
        - Primera
        - Shearwater
        - The Hammer
        - Babu
        - Babu Dancer
        - Bronze Babu
        - Crozier
        - Garwol
        - Prudent
        - Babu's On
      - Cantaber
        - Cantab
      - Djafar
      - Marveil
        - Azteque
      - Roc Du Diable
      - Targui
        - Lord
        - Oreka
        - Cadiz
        - Sol D'Or
        - Zinder
        - Tardini
      - Cardanil
      - Emperor
        - Tipperary Star
      - Galcador
      - Djemlah
      - Liberator
      - Nyangal
        - Caporal
      - Rush
      - Argur
        - Arturo A
        - Estreno
      - Astyanax
        - Korok
        - Myjavan
      - Candaules
      - Pharel
        - Giramundi
      - Entente Cordiale
      - Jaddo
        - Diacano
      - Hugh Lupus
        - Hethersett
        - Lupus
        - Signal Rocket
        - Clouet
        - Tiber
      - Olean
      - Atlas
      - Floriados
      - Ace of Clubs
        - Tartan Ace
    - Wirbelwind
      - Kaliber
        - Don Carlos
    - Ringo
      - Xanthor
    - Tornado
      - Fontenay
        - Le Beau Prince
        - Tropique
        - Saim
        - Gelsemium
      - Lacaduv
        - Pier Capponi
      - Aquino
        - Cedric
        - Mister Tory
      - Fontenoy
        - Robot
      - Tosco
        - Tracy
      - Magabit
        - Paraje
      - Tyrone
        - Le Mesnil
      - Mr Tor
      - Thymus
      - Tiepoletto
        - Tiepolo
    - Micipsa
    - Le Volcan
      - Triguero
      - Tarzan
      - Milord
        - Amoretto
    - Caracalla II
      - Claudius
    - Coaraze
      - Canthare
      - Xasco
      - Empyreu
      - Emerson
        - Emerilo
        - Rimesault
        - Solicitor
      - Coaralde
      - Viziane
      - Rhone
    - Djask
    - Cadir
      - Pantheon
    - Timor
      - Tahoe
        - Tai
      - Pronto
        - Indian Chief
        - Practicante
        - Utopico
        - Balconaje
        - Uruguayo
        - Redtop
        - Primed
    - Tourment
      - Chingacgook
        - Nic
        - Han D'Island
      - Zagros
      - Kaiserstuhl
        - Oktavio
        - Carlos Primero
      - Violon D'Ingres
        - Montal
        - Vitaner
    - Amasis
    - Tournoi
    - Turmoil
      - Popof III
      - Escart III
        - L'Escargot
        - Garoupe
      - Bontur
      - Tajon
    - Ambiorix
      - Ambler
      - Gray Phantom
      - Ambehaving
        - Ampose
        - More Scents
        - Sloopy
        - Augustus Bay
        - Good Behaving
      - Amber Morn
        - Royal Chocolate
        - Amber Herod
      - Count Amber
        - Amberoid
        - My Pal Houston
      - Ambiopoise
        - Faraway Son
        - Twice Worthy
      - Hitting Away
      - Sheet Anchor
        - Stein
        - Mountdrago
      - Pinjara
      - Pleasure Seeker
    - Blue Fox
    - Charleval
    - Cagire
      - El Toro
      - Homer
    - Fort Napoleon
      - Devon
      - Estheta
    - Magnific
    - Tournai
    - Terrington
    - Touragua
      - Frisco
        - Franjezco
        - Principe Duero
      - Anglo
      - Pongo
      - Ricky
      - Donagua
      - Snobissimo
      - Ragazzo
      - Koku
    - Datour
      - Dare

== Pedigree ==
Pedigree of Ksar (FR) (3-n) chestnut stallion, 1918
Sire Brûleur Bay 1910	Chouberski; Bay 1902	Gardefeu; Bay 1895	Cambyse*^
Sire Brûleur Bay 1910	Chouberski; Bay 1902	Gardefeu; Bay 1895	Bougie
Sire Brûleur Bay 1910	Chouberski; Bay 1902	Campanule; Bay 1891	The Bard
Sire Brûleur Bay 1910	Chouberski; Bay 1902	Campanule; Bay 1891	Santa Lucia
Sire Brûleur Bay 1910	Basse Terre; Chestnut 1899	Omnium II*; Chestnut 1892	Upas*^
Sire Brûleur Bay 1910	Basse Terre; Chestnut 1899	Omnium II*; Chestnut 1892	Bluette*
Sire Brûleur Bay 1910	Basse Terre; Chestnut 1899	Bijou; Bay 1890	St Gatien
Sire Brûleur Bay 1910	Basse Terre; Chestnut 1899	Bijou; Bay 1890	Thora
Dam Kizil Kourgan Chestnut 1899	Omnium II*; Chestnut 1892	Upas*; Chestnut 1833	Dollar*^
Dam Kizil Kourgan Chestnut 1899	Omnium II*; Chestnut 1892	Upas*; Chestnut 1833	Rosemary
Dam Kizil Kourgan Chestnut 1899	Omnium II*; Chestnut 1892	Bluette*; Chestnut 1886	Wellingtonia
Dam Kizil Kourgan Chestnut 1899	Omnium II*; Chestnut 1892	Bluette*; Chestnut 1886	Blue Serge
Dam Kizil Kourgan Chestnut 1899	Kasbah; Bay 1892	Vigilant; Bay 1879	Vermout
Dam Kizil Kourgan Chestnut 1899	Kasbah; Bay 1892	Vigilant; Bay 1879	Virgule
Dam Kizil Kourgan Chestnut 1899	Kasbah; Bay 1892	Katia; Chestnut 1883	Guy Dayrell
Dam Kizil Kourgan Chestnut 1899	Kasbah; Bay 1892	Katia; Chestnut 1883	Keapsake (family: 3-n)

* Ksar is inbred 3S x 2D to the stallion Omnium II, meaning that he appears third generation on the sire side of his pedigree and second generation on the dam side of his pedigree.

*^ Ksar is inbred 6S x 5S x 4D to the stallion Dollar, meaning that he appears sixth generation (via Cambyse)^ and fifth generation (via Upas)^ on the sire side of his pedigree and fourth generation on the dam side of his pedigree.
