= Ambiorix (horse) =

French-bred Thoroughbred racehorse

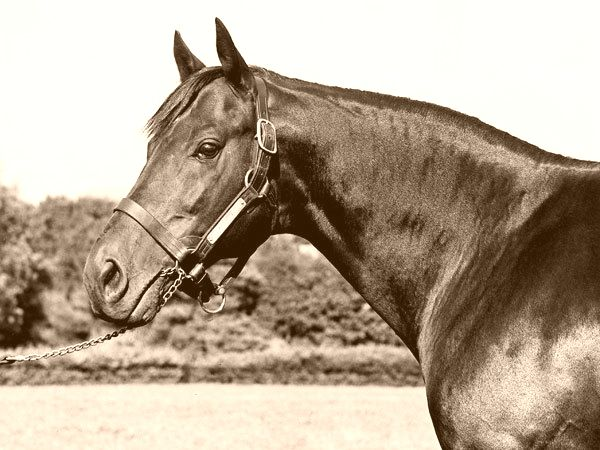
- Ambiorix II (1946)
- Sire: Tourbillon
- Grandsire: Ksar
- Dam: Lavendula
- Damsire: Pharos
- Sex: Stallion
- Foaled: 1946
- Country: France
- Colour: Bay
- Breeder: Haras de Fresnay-le-Buffard
- Owner: Marcel Boussac
- Trainer: Charles Semblat
- Record: 7: 4-2-0
- Earnings: ₣4,638,600 + £832

Major wins
- Selsey Stakes (1948); Grand Criterium (1948)

Awards
- French Champion Two-Year-Old-Colt (1948); Leading sire in North America (1961); Leading broodmare sire in Great Britain & Ireland (1963)
- Last updated on 21 February 2010

Ambiorix (1946–1975) (also known as Ambiorix II to distinguish him from another Ambiorix [1940], also by Tourbillon) was a French Champion Two-Year-Old Thoroughbred racehorse who became a leading sire.

== Pedigree ==
Bred by Marcel Boussac at his Haras de Fresnay-le-Buffard in Orne, he was sired by Tourbillon whom Ambiorix II would help make the Leading sire in France in 1948. Tourbillon was a son of Ksar, a two-time winner of the Prix de l'Arc de Triomphe and the Leading sire in France in 1931. The dam of Ambiorix II was Lavendula, a daughter of Pharos, the Leading sire in Great Britain & Ireland in 1931 and Leading sire in France in 1939. Ambiorix was a half-brother to Source Sucree (dam of Turn-To), Perfume II (dam of My Babu and Sayani), Singadula and Wild Lavender II.

== Race record ==
Trained by Charles Semblat and ridden by Roger Poincelet, Ambiorix proved to be a better runner at races around 8-10 furlongs in distance rather than the European Classic distance of 12 furlongs or more.

In 1948 Ambiorix made three starts. He finished off the board in his racing debut in the French Prix de Chatou and then easily won the Selsey Stakes at Goodwood Racecourse in England. He followed this with a win in the most important race for two-year-olds in France, the Grand Criterium. His performances earned him the 1948 French Champion Two-Year-Old-Colt honors. Racing at age three in 1949, Ambiorix made four starts. Jockey Poincelet guided the colt to wins in the Prix Lupin at Longchamp Racecourse and the Prix Greffulhe at Saint-Cloud Racecourse, both of which were run at around ten furlongs. Ambiorix then earned seconds to Good Luck in the 1949 Prix du Jockey Club and to Val Drake in the Prix Hocquart.

== Stud record ==
After Ambiorix retired from racing, Marcel Boussac believed that he would have more value as a sire in the United States where the vast majority of race distances suited his record best. He was then sold for US$250,000 to a syndicate led by Bull Hancock, who brought him to stand at stud in time for the 1950 season at his Claiborne Farm near Paris, Kentucky.

Amborix's grave at Claiborne Farm

Ambiorix spent the rest of his life at Claiborne Farm, where he sired fifty-one stakes race winners and was the Leading sire in North America in 1961. His best offspring included:

- High Voltage (1952) - American Champion Two-Year-Old Filly, won Matron Stakes, Coaching Club American Oaks
- Hitting Away (1958) - won Withers Stakes, Dwyer Stakes, Bernard Baruch Handicap, Royal Palm Handicap (2x)
- Ambiopoise (1958) - won Jersey Derby, Gotham Stakes, Discovery Handicap, sire of Faraway Son
- Count Amber (1957) - won Narragansett Special, sire of Amberoid
- Amber Morn (1956) - won Bowling Green Handicap, Autumn Handicap, sire of Queen's Plate winners Royal Chocolate and Amber Herod
- Make Sail, winner of the Kentucky Oaks.

Through his daughter Fantan II, Ambiorix was the damsire of Ragusa, who was a major factor in him earning Leading broodmare sire in Great Britain & Ireland honors in 1963.

After being pensioned, Ambiorix died at age twenty-nine in January 1975 at Claiborne Farm and is buried in the farm's equine cemetery.

== Sire line tree ==
- Ambiorix
  - Ambler
  - Gray Phantom
  - Ambehaving
    - Ampose
    - More Scents
    - Sloopy
    - Augustus Bay
    - Good Behaving
  - Amber Morn
    - Royal Chocolate
      - Gone to Royalty
    - Amber Herod
  - Count Amber
    - Amberoid
    - My Pal Houston
  - Ambiopoise
    - Faraway Son
      - Bynoderm
        - Skip Out Front
      - Boitron
      - Mantle
    - Twice Worthy
  - Hitting Away
  - Sheet Anchor
    - Stein
    - Mountdrago
      - Monte Ruisenor
      - Monte Simon
      - Monte Pirata
      - Montubio
      - Monte Silvestre
  - Pinjara
  - Pleasure Seeker

== Pedigree ==
Pedigree of Ambiorix, bay colt, 1946
Sire Tourbillon (FR)	Ksar (FR)	Bruleur (FR)	Chouberski (FR)
Sire Tourbillon (FR)	Ksar (FR)	Bruleur (FR)	Basse Terre
Sire Tourbillon (FR)	Ksar (FR)	Kizil Kourgan (FR)	Omnium II (FR)
Sire Tourbillon (FR)	Ksar (FR)	Kizil Kourgan (FR)	Kasbah (FR)
Sire Tourbillon (FR)	Durban (FR)	Durbar	Rabelais (GB)
Sire Tourbillon (FR)	Durban (FR)	Durbar	Armenia
Sire Tourbillon (FR)	Durban (FR)	Banshee (FR)	Irish Lad
Sire Tourbillon (FR)	Durban (FR)	Banshee (FR)	Frizette
Dam Lavendula (FR)	Pharos (GB)	Phalaris (GB)	Polymelus (GB)
Dam Lavendula (FR)	Pharos (GB)	Phalaris (GB)	Bromus (GB)
Dam Lavendula (FR)	Pharos (GB)	Scapa Flow (GB)	Chaucer (GB)
Dam Lavendula (FR)	Pharos (GB)	Scapa Flow (GB)	Anchora
Dam Lavendula (FR)	Sweet Lavender (GB)	Swynford (GB)	John O'Gaunt (GB)
Dam Lavendula (FR)	Sweet Lavender (GB)	Swynford (GB)	Canterbury Pilgrim (GB)
Dam Lavendula (FR)	Sweet Lavender (GB)	Marchetta (GB)	Marco (GB)
Dam Lavendula (FR)	Sweet Lavender (GB)	Marchetta (GB)	Hettie Sorrel (family: 1-w)
