= Kandy (horse) =

French-bred Thoroughbred racehorse

- Sire: Alcantara
- Grandsire: Perth
- Dam: Kiao Tchau
- Damsire: Chouberski
- Sex: Mare
- Foaled: 1929
- Country: France
- Colour: Bay
- Breeder: Evremond de Saint-Alary
- Owner: Evremond de Saint-Alary
- Trainer: Frank Carter
- Record: 3: 1-0-0
- Earnings: £8,034

Major wins
- 1000 Guineas (1932)

Kandy (foaled 1929 – after 1943) was a French Thoroughbred racehorse and broodmare. In a racing career which lasted for two months in the spring of 1932 she won one race from three starts. After finishing unplaced on her debut she was sent to England and recorded a 33/1 upset victory in the 1000 Guineas. She was retired from racing after running unplaced in the Poule d'Essai des Pouliches less than a month later. She has been described as one of the worst horses ever to win a British classic race. As a broodmare, however, she did produce one very good horse in the form of the South African champion Kipling.

== Background ==
Kandy was a bay mare bred in France by her owner Evremond de Saint-Alary and trained by Frank Carter. The filly was named after the city of Kandy in what was then known as Ceylon.

She was sired by Alacantara, who won the Prix du Jockey Club in 1911 and was twice the Leading sire in France. Kandy's dam Kiao Tchau was a daughter of Kizil Kourgan, an outstanding racemare who won the Grand Prix de Paris in 1902. Her other descendants included the Prix de l'Arc de Triomphe winner Ksar. The identity of Kiao Tchau's sire is uncertain. In the year before she was born, her dam was covered by two stallions, Alcantara and Chouberski. Second coverings only usually occur if the first cover was unsuccessful and it is therefore likely that Kiao Tchau was sired by Chouberski. If the mare was sired by Alcantara, then Kandy's pedigree was an example of extreme inbreeding.

== Racing career ==
=== 1932: three-year-old season ===
Kandy was slow to mature and did not run as a juvenile in 1931 although she was entered in many of the following season's best races, suggesting that she was regarded as having some potential. On her first racecourse appearance in the early spring of 1932 she ran very poorly and finished unplaced, leading her owner to cancel most of her entries. Owing to a clerical oversight however, her entry in the 1000 Guineas was allowed to stand. In training gallops in France the filly showed no discernable ability until Carter opted to try her over a long, straight course (similar to Newmarket's Rowley Mile) and noticed considerable improvement. The filly was therefore sent to England and temporarily joined the Clarehaven stable of Victor Gilpin at Newmarket.

On 29 of April Kandy was ridden by Charlie Elliott in the 119th running of the 1000 Guineas and started a 33/1 outsider in a nineteen-runner field. She won by a length from Thorndean with Safe Return (Molecomb Stakes) a length back in third.

On he return to France Kandy was made favourite for the Poule d'Essai des Pouliches over 1600 metres at Longchamp Racecourse in May but never looked likely to win and finished unplaced behind Ligne de Fond. She was retired from racing shortly afterwards.

== Assessment and honours ==
In their book, A Century of Champions, based on the Timeform rating system, John Randall and Tony Morris rated Kandy the "worst" winner of the 1000 Guineas in the 20th century.

== Breeding record ==
As a broodmare, Kandy produced at least three foals between 1936 and 1943:

- Kipling, a bay colt, foaled in 1936, by Asterus. Sent to South Africa where he won the Durban July Handicap and became a successful breeding stallion.
- Kervoline, bay filly, 1942, by Sirtam
- Kergriste, bay filly, 1943, by Thor

== Pedigree ==
Pedigree of Kandy (FR), bay mare, 1929
Sire Alcantara (FR) 1908	Perth (FR); 1896	War Dance	Galliard (GB)
Sire Alcantara (FR) 1908	Perth (FR); 1896	War Dance	War Paint (IRE)
Sire Alcantara (FR) 1908	Perth (FR); 1896	Primrose Dame (GB)	Barcaldine (IRE)
Sire Alcantara (FR) 1908	Perth (FR); 1896	Primrose Dame (GB)	Lady Rosebery
Sire Alcantara (FR) 1908	Toison d'Or (FR); 1901	Le Sancy	Atlantic (GB)
Sire Alcantara (FR) 1908	Toison d'Or (FR); 1901	Le Sancy	Gem of Gems (GB)
Sire Alcantara (FR) 1908	Toison d'Or (FR); 1901	Harfleur	Archiduc
Sire Alcantara (FR) 1908	Toison d'Or (FR); 1901	Harfleur	Hauteur (GB)
Dam Kiao Tchau (FR) 1914	Chouberski (FR); 1902	Gardefeu	Cambyse
Dam Kiao Tchau (FR) 1914	Chouberski (FR); 1902	Gardefeu	Bougie
Dam Kiao Tchau (FR) 1914	Chouberski (FR); 1902	Campanule	The Bard (GB)
Dam Kiao Tchau (FR) 1914	Chouberski (FR); 1902	Campanule	Saint Lucia (GB)
Dam Kiao Tchau (FR) 1914	Kizil Kourgan (FR); 1899	Omnium	Upas
Dam Kiao Tchau (FR) 1914	Kizil Kourgan (FR); 1899	Omnium	Bluette
Dam Kiao Tchau (FR) 1914	Kizil Kourgan (FR); 1899	Kasbah	Vigilant
Dam Kiao Tchau (FR) 1914	Kizil Kourgan (FR); 1899	Kasbah	Katia (Family 3-n)

- The above pedigree assume that Chouberski was the sire of Kiao Tchau
