= Emerson (horse) =

Brazilian-bred thoroughbred racehorse

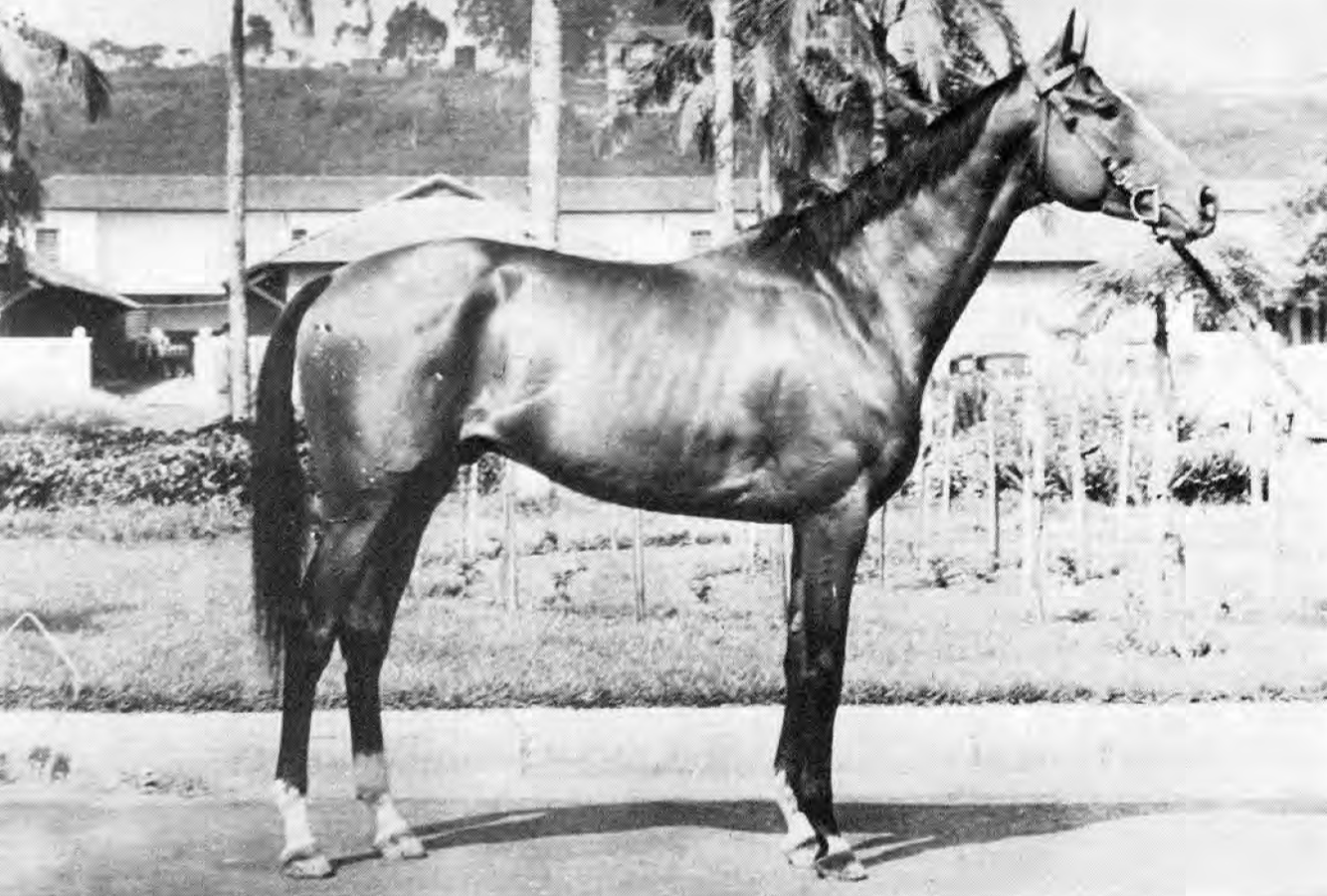
- Emerson
- Sire: Coaraze
- Grandsire: Tourbillon
- Dam: Empeñosa
- Damsire: Full Sail
- Sex: Stallion
- Foaled: July 17, 1958
- Died: December 1987
- Country: Brazil
- Colour: Bay
- Breeder: Roberto e Nelson Seabra
- Owner: Roberto e Nelson Seabra
- Record: 5: 5-0-0
- Earnings: Cr$11,950,000

Emerson (17 July 1958–Dec. 1987) was an undefeated Brazilian racehorse best known for winning three Derbies.

== Background ==
Emerson was bred by the brothers Roberto and Nelson Seabra at their Haras Guanabara in Brazil.

Emerson's sire, Coaraze, had won multiple important races in his native France, including the Prix du Jockey Club, Prix Morny, and Grand Prix de Saint-Cloud, before becoming a very important sire in Brazil.

Emerson was out of the mare Empeñosa, who was an excellent racehorse from Argentina, where she won the Gran Premio Polla de Potrancas and Gran Premio Selección before being purchased by the Seabra brothers for 44,000 pesos. Empeñosa's female family traced back to Ante Diem, one of the most important foundation mares in South American breeding.

== Racing career ==
Emerson was undefeated in five starts. He raced exclusively at the age of three, winning the Grande Prêmio Cruzeiro do Sul (Brazilian Derby), Grande Prêmio Derby Paulista, Grande Prêmio Derby Sul-Americano, and Clássico América.

== Stud record ==
Upon retirement from racing, Emerson was purchased by a French syndicate headed by Baron Guy de Rothschild and exported to France to stand stud at the Haras Nonant-le-Pin. There, he became a successful sire and broodmare sire.

Emerson was the sire of Rescousse, winner of the 1972 Prix de Diane.

Emerson died in December of 1987.

== Pedigree ==
Pedigree of Emerson (BRZ), bay stallion, foaled July 17, 1958
Sire Coaraze	Tourbillon	Ksar	Bruleur
Sire Coaraze	Tourbillon	Ksar	Kizil Kourgan
Sire Coaraze	Tourbillon	Durban	Durbar
Sire Coaraze	Tourbillon	Durban	Banshee
Sire Coaraze	Corrida	Coronach	Hurry On
Sire Coaraze	Corrida	Coronach	Wet Kiss
Sire Coaraze	Corrida	Zariba	Sardanapale
Sire Coaraze	Corrida	Zariba	St. Lucre
Dam Empeñosa	Full Sail	Fairway	Phalaris
Dam Empeñosa	Full Sail	Fairway	Scapa Flow
Dam Empeñosa	Full Sail	Fancy Free	Stefan the Great
Dam Empeñosa	Full Sail	Fancy Free	Celiba
Dam Empeñosa	Ermua	Congreve	Copyright
Dam Empeñosa	Ermua	Congreve	Per Noi
Dam Empeñosa	Ermua	Guernica	Sandal
Dam Empeñosa	Ermua	Guernica	Energie

== See also ==
- List of leading Thoroughbred racehorses
