= Motrico =

Motrico may refer to:

- Motrico (horse), a race horse, twice winner of Prix de l'Arc de Triomphe in the 1930s
- Mutriku, a town in the coast of Guipuzcoa, Spain, known in Spanish as Motrico
