= Evremond de Saint-Alary =

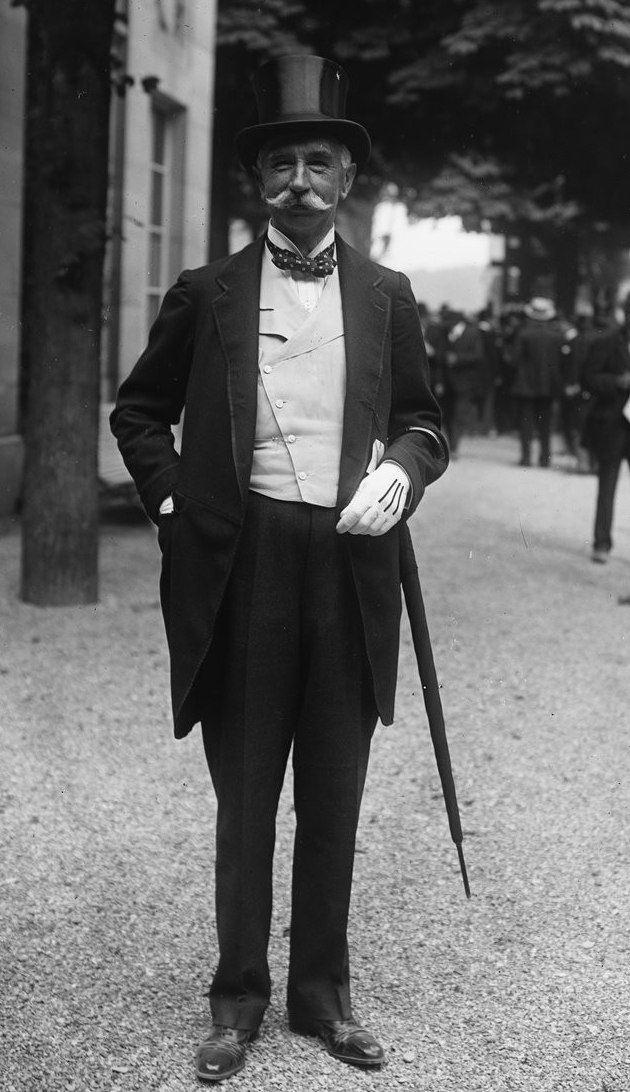

Count Evremond de Saint-Alary (1868–1941) was a leading owner and breeder of Thoroughbred racehorses in France. Heir of a well known family from the French West Indies, Saint-Alary became involved in horse racing as a young man in his twenties, and in the early 1890s acquired Haras de Saint Pair du Mont, a horse breeding farm at Le Cadran near Cambremer in Calvados, Normandy.

A passionate man, Evremond de Saint-Alary once challenged a member of the press to a duel after he had written an article criticizing one of his horses.

In 1893 Saint-Alary purchased a yearling at the Ventes de Deauville auction, which he named Omnium. One of the best horses he would ever own, under jockey/trainer Edgar Rolfe, Omnium won seventeen races in three years of competition including numerous important events such as the 1895 Prix du Jockey Club, the French equivalent of England's Epsom Derby. Omnium was retired to stud duty at Haras de Saint Pair du Mont and despite dying only a few years later, his successful progeny made him the leading sire in France in 1902.

In 1920, Evremond de Saint-Alary scored the first of his two wins in France's most prestigious race, the Prix de l'Arc de Triomphe. Comrade, a colt trained by Peter Gilpin who had cost Saint-Alary only twenty-five guineas, won the inaugural running of the Arc and also won the Grand Prix de Paris. Saint-Alary raced in England as well in the 1930s where his horses trained by Frank Carter won two of the Classic Races and in France where his second Prix de l'Arc de Triomphe in 1935.

Evremond de Saint-Alary remained active till his death in 1941. In his honor, the Group One Prix Saint-Alary at Longchamp Racecourse was named for him.

== Selected races won ==
- BOABDIL-24 fevrier 1891-Maisons-Laffitte
- Prix de la Forêt – Omnium II (1894), Casternau (1896), Royal Mint (1897)
- Prix du Jockey Club – Omnium II (1895)
- Prix du Cadran – Omnium II (1896)
- Prix Boïard – Omnium II (1896), Castelnau (1897)
- Prix du Prince d'Orange – Omnium II (1895, 1896), Finglas (1928)
- Prix du Conseil Municipal – Omnium II (1895 & 1896), Basse Pointe (1911), Porphyros (1940)
- Prix Gladiateur – Omnium II (1896), Basse Pointe (1911)
- Prix de Guiche – Pas de Danse (1896) et Castelnau (1897)
- Poule d'Essai des Pouliches – Kizil Kourgan (1902)
- Prix de l'Arc de Triomphe – Comrade (1920),[KSAR (1921–1922)1st double winner property of Edmond Blanc] Samos (1935)
- Grand Prix de Paris – Kizil Kourgan (1902), Brûleur (1913), Comrade (1920)
- 1,000 Guineas – Kandy (1932)
- 2,000 Guineas – Le Ksar (1937)
