= Le Ksar =

French-bred Thoroughbred racehorse

- Sire: Ksar
- Grandsire: Bruleur
- Dam: Queen Iseult
- Damsire: Teddy
- Sex: Stallion
- Foaled: 1934
- Country: France
- Colour: Bay
- Breeder: Leon Volterra
- Owner: Evremond de Saint-Alary
- Trainer: Frank Carter
- Record: 8: 1-2-0 (incomplete)

Major wins
- 2000 Guineas (1937)

Le Ksar (1934 – after 1949) was a French Thoroughbred racehorse and sire. Unraced as a two-year-old, he finished second in the Prix Juigné on his racecourse debut and then recorded an emphatic upset victory in the 2000 Guineas. He finished second in the Poule d'Essai des Poulains but ran poorly in the Epsom Derby and never reproduced his best form in subsequent races. He stood as a breeding stallion in England and Argentina but made no impact as a sire of winners.

== Background ==
Le Ksar was a big, "workmanlike" bay horse standing 16 hands 2½ inches high bred in France by Leon Volterra. As a yearling he was old privately to Evremond de Saint-Alary who owned him during his racing career. The colt was sent into training with Frank Carter at Chantilly.

He was sired by Ksar, an outstanding racehorse who won the Prix de l'Arc de Triomphe in 1921 and 1922 before becoming a successful breeding stallion. He was the Leading sire in France in 1931. Ksar was a representative of the Byerley Turk sire line, unlike more than 95% of modern thoroughbreds, who descend directly from the Darley Arabian. Le Ksar's dam Queen Iseult produced several other winners including William of Valence (City and Suburban Handicap) and King of Trumps (Prix Juigné), and was closely related to the Goodwood Cup winner Monsieur l'Amiral.

== Racing career ==
=== 1937: three-year-old season ===
Le Ksar was unraced as a two-year-old and made his debut in the Prix Juigné over 2000 metres at Longchamp Racecourse in April 1937 in which he finished second to Chesham. The colt was then sent to England for the 129th running of the 2000 Guineas over the Rowley Mile at Newmarket Racecourse on 28 April and started a 20/1 outsider in and 18-runner field. Fairford started favourite, while the other fancied runners included Foray (July Stakes), Fair Copy (Middle Park Stakes), Goya (Gimcrack Stakes) and Le Grand Duc (New Stakes). Ridden by Charles Semblat Le Ksar raced up the stands-side (the left-side of the course from the jockeys' viewpoint), took the lead a furlong out and won "in the easiest possible style" by four lengths from Goya with Mid-day Sun half a length back in third. Semblat stated that he had been confident of victory at half way and described the winner as "nice-tempered" but "a little nervous". After the race Evremond Saint-Alary reportedly rejected an offer of £50,000 for the colt.

Le Ksar returned to France for the Poule d'Essai des Poulains over 1600 metres at Longchamp on 15 May. Drap d'Or opened up a long lead and although Le Ksar finished strongly he was beaten by a length into second place. On 2 June, with Semblat again in the saddle, started the 9/1 third favourite for the Epsom Derby. Before the race Semblat was reported to have said "I am confident I have a good chance in the Derby. I have made a careful study of the course with maps and a book and have already won the race on paper". Le Ksar was towards the rear of the field throughout the race, ran very wide on the final turn, and finished unplaced behind Mid-day Sun. Semblat claimed that the colt had failed to cope with the downhill section of the course.

His subsequent form was disappointing and he finished unplaced in the Cambridgeshire Handicap at Newmarket in October.

=== 1938: four-year-old season ===
Despite the death of Frank Carter at the end of 1937, Le Ksar remained in training as a four-year-old but failed to win any major races. In April he ran without success in the Newbury Spring Cup and in autumn he finished unplaced in both the Prix de l'Arc de Triomphe and the Cambridgeshire Handicap.

== Assessment and honours ==
In their book, A Century of Champions, based on the Timeform rating system, John Randall and Tony Morris rated Le Ksar a "poor" winner of the 2000 Guineas.

== Stud record ==
Le Ksar was retired from racing in 1939 to become a breeding stallion in Britain before being exported to Argentina in 1944. He sired no major winners in either country.

== Pedigree ==
Pedigree of Le Ksar (FR), bay stallion, 1934
Sire Ksar (FR) 1918	Bruleur; 1910	Chouberski	Gardefeu
Sire Ksar (FR) 1918	Bruleur; 1910	Chouberski	Campanule
Sire Ksar (FR) 1918	Bruleur; 1910	Basse Terre	Omnium II*
Sire Ksar (FR) 1918	Bruleur; 1910	Basse Terre	Bijou (GB)
Sire Ksar (FR) 1918	Kizil Kourgan; 1899	Omnium II*	Upas
Sire Ksar (FR) 1918	Kizil Kourgan; 1899	Omnium II*	Bluette
Sire Ksar (FR) 1918	Kizil Kourgan; 1899	Kasbah	Vigilant
Sire Ksar (FR) 1918	Kizil Kourgan; 1899	Kasbah	Katia
Dam Queen Iseult (FR) 1924	Teddy; 1913	Ajax	Flying Fox (GB)
Dam Queen Iseult (FR) 1924	Teddy; 1913	Ajax	Amie
Dam Queen Iseult (FR) 1924	Teddy; 1913	Rondeau (GB)	Bay Ronald
Dam Queen Iseult (FR) 1924	Teddy; 1913	Rondeau (GB)	Doremi
Dam Queen Iseult (FR) 1924	Sweet Agnes; 1915	Sea Sick	Elf
Dam Queen Iseult (FR) 1924	Sweet Agnes; 1915	Sea Sick	Saf Saf
Dam Queen Iseult (FR) 1924	Sweet Agnes; 1915	Arva	Gulliver (GB)
Dam Queen Iseult (FR) 1924	Sweet Agnes; 1915	Arva	Rose d'Amour (GB) (Family: 21-a)

* Le Ksar is inbred 4S x 3S to the stallion Omnium II, meaning that he appears fourth and third generation on the sire side of his pedigree.
