= Haras de Saint Pair du Mont =

Boutique stud farm based in Normandy, France

Coordinates: 49.13312°N 0.05984°E

Haras de Saint Pair (formerly Haras de Saint Pair du Mont) is a thoroughbred stud farm located near Cambremer in the Calvados region of Normandy, France. Established in 1883 by Léonce Delâtre, it is one of the oldest continuously operating stud farms in the region.

The farm is currently owned and managed by Andreas Putsch. Under his leadership, Haras de Saint Pair has continued to produce high-quality thoroughbreds, employing a holistic management approach that emphasizes comprehensive care and horsemanship.

Throughout its history, the stud has bred numerous notable racehorses. In recent years, such as the Group 1 winning stallion Vadamos and the multiple Group 1 winning champion mare Pearls Galore.

== History ==
Haras de Saint Pair was founded in 1883 by Léonce Delâtre, following his sale of La Celle de Saint-Cloud (now the site of Saint-Cloud Racecourse). Situated in Normandy near Deauville, it is among the oldest thoroughbred breeding farms in France.

After Delâtre's death in 1892, the stud was acquired by Count Évremond de Saint-Alary. During his ownership, the stud bred several influential horses, including Omnium II, who became France's leading sire in 1902, and his progeny such as Kizil Kourgan and Brûleur. Brûleur, in turn, sired Ksar, a dual winner of the Prix de l’Arc de Triomphe and one of France's most celebrated racehorses.

Saint Pair bred, or was connected to four Prix de l'Arc de Triomphe winners in the early 20th century, cementing its reputation in European racing history. Subsequent owners, including Jean Stern, continued its tradition of breeding top-class horses, such as Sicambre, winner of the Prix du Jockey Club and Grand Prix de Paris.

After a period of decline, the stud was revitalized under Bo Göransson in the late 1990s and was later acquired in 2007 by Andreas Putsch. Putsch implemented a holistic management approach and invested in infrastructure and bloodstock, restoring the stud's success both on the track and in European sales rings.
