= Dollar (horse) =

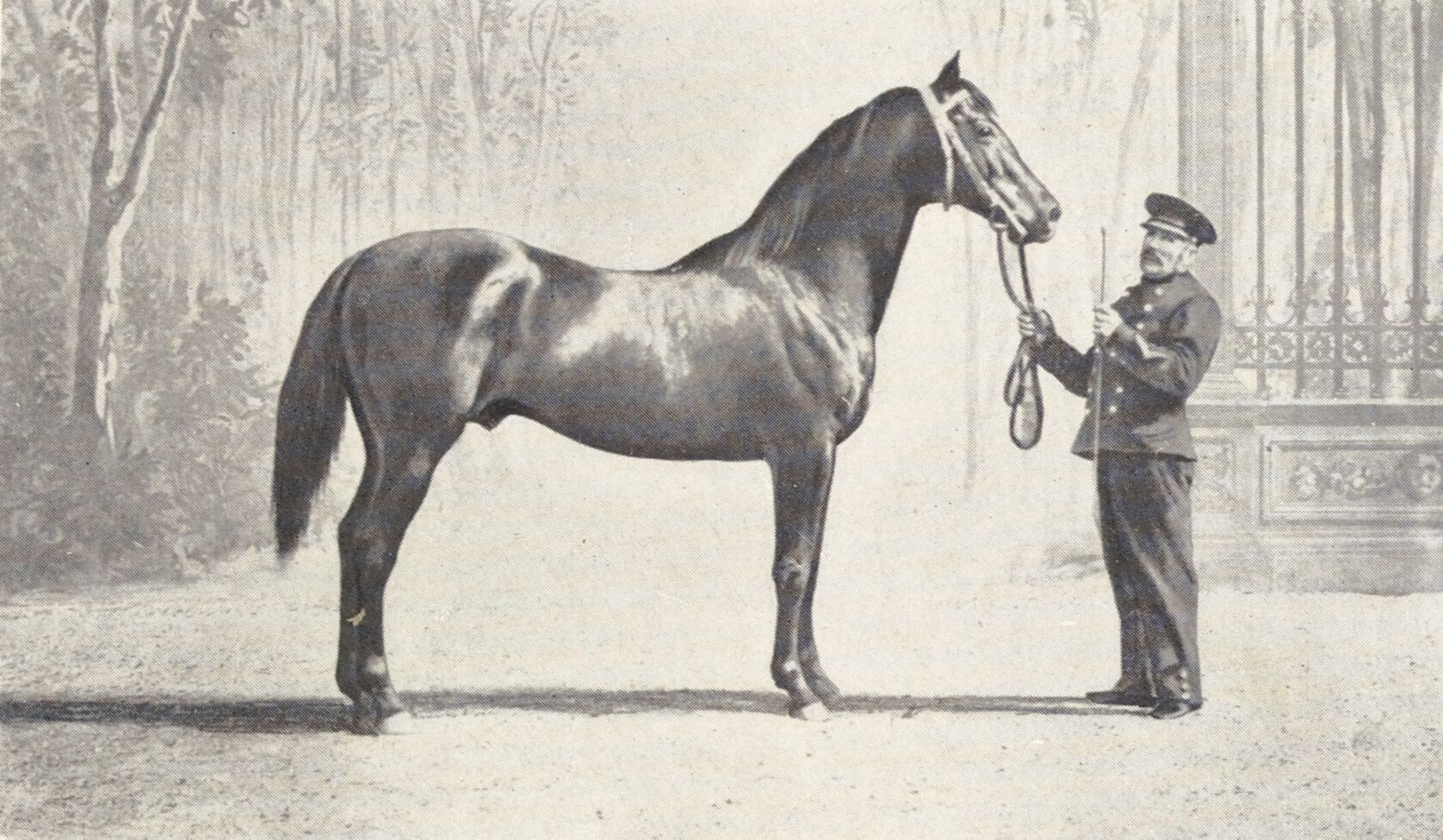
- From Les courses de chevaux (1912)
- Sire: The Flying Dutchman
- Grandsire: Bay Middleton
- Dam: Payment
- Damsire: Slane
- Sex: Stallion
- Foaled: 1860
- Colour: Brown
- Breeder: Auguste Lupin
- Owner: Auguste Lupin
- Record: 19: 8-5-3

Dollar (1860–1887) was a Thoroughbred racehorse and sire. He best known as the principal conduit to extend the Byerley Turk sire line to the present day.

== Background ==
Dollar was foaled in 1860 out of the mare Payment, by the sire The Flying Dutchman. He stood 15.2 1/4 hands tall, and his temperament was good.

== Racing career ==
Dollar raced from 1862 through 1864. His wins include:

- Prix de l'Empereur (1863)
- Prix de la Societe d'Encourgement (1863)
- Prix Principal (1863)
- Great Northampton Stakes (1864)
- Grand Prix de l'Imperatrice (1864)
- Prix de l'Empereur (1864)
- Goodwood Cup (1864)
- Brighton Cup (1864)

== Stud record ==
Dollar retired to stud at Virolay, and led the sires list in France in 1878. His sire line continued through his sons Upas and Androcles, with the latter continuing through to the present day. Other important sons include Salvator, Fontainebleu, Louis D'Or, and Martin Pecheur. Some important daughters include Lavandiere, Moissonneuse, Clio, Verte Bonne, Almanza, Astree, Perla, Pristina, and Pensacola. He died at Virolay in 1887.

== Sire line tree ==
- Dollar
  - Dami
  - Il Maestro
  - Salvanos
  - Androcles
    - Cambyse
      - Callistrate
        - Gost
          - Badajoz
            - Épinard
              - Rodosto
        - Bat
        - Torquato Tasso
        - Genial
        - Stinca
        - Strozzi
      - Kosroes
        - Shebdiz
      - Kerym
      - Gardefeu
        - Chanaan
        - Chouberski
          - Bruleur
            - Ksar
            - Priori
              - Tutor
                - The Grasshopper
        - Quintette
        - Sablonnet
      - Arbaces
      - Codoman
        - Monitor
        - Sifflet
  - Saint Cyr
    - Pastisson
      - Xeny
  - Salvator
    - Elzevir
    - Ossian
  - Fountainebleau
    - Phlegathon
    - Jouancy
  - Patriarche
    - Gettatore
    - Lutin
      - Kadikoi
        - Frack
        - Moroldo
      - Hautbois
    - Beau Page
  - Thieusies
  - Greenback
  - Prologue
    - Vin Sec
  - Vignemale
    - Gil Peres
      - Aigle Royal
    - Merlin
      - Qui Vive
    - Caudeyran
  - Louis D'Or
  - Saumur
    - Clamart
  - Cimier
  - Garrick
    - Oranzeb
    - Marzio
    - Onorio
    - Ulpiano
  - Martin Pecheur
  - Sansonnet
    - Courlis
      - Brassac
    - Coq
  - The Condor
    - Tancarville
    - Cloridano
  - Saint Honore
  - Souci
  - Upas
    - Omnium II
      - Arizona
        - Malteser
    - Elf
      - Marsan
        - Brabant
          - Gris Perle
            - Mont Tremblant
      - Pitti
      - Sea Sick
        - Antivari
        - Le Dragon
        - Battersea
        - The Coyote
        - Si Si
        - Tidal
      - Nimbus
        - Rubusio
        - Keror
        - Cerfeuil
        - Le Capucin
        - Cloudbank
        - Felton
      - Rural
    - Ivoire
  - Acheron
    - Massina
    - Atleta
    - Ranquel
  - Bocage
    - Ob
      - Kummel
  - Dauphin
    - Hero
    - Hareng
  - Cerbere

== Pedigree ==
Pedigree of The Flying Dutchman, dark bay or brown colt, 1860
Sire The Flying Dutchman 1846	Bay Middleton; 1833	Sultan; 1816	Selim
Sire The Flying Dutchman 1846	Bay Middleton; 1833	Sultan; 1816	Bacchante
Sire The Flying Dutchman 1846	Bay Middleton; 1833	Cobweb; 1821	Phantom
Sire The Flying Dutchman 1846	Bay Middleton; 1833	Cobweb; 1821	Filagree
Sire The Flying Dutchman 1846	Barbelle; 1836	Sandbeck; 1818	Catton*
Sire The Flying Dutchman 1846	Barbelle; 1836	Sandbeck; 1818	Orvillina
Sire The Flying Dutchman 1846	Barbelle; 1836	Darioletta; 1822	Amadis
Sire The Flying Dutchman 1846	Barbelle; 1836	Darioletta; 1822	Selina
Dam Payment 1848	Slane; 1833	Royal Oak; 1823	Catton*
Dam Payment 1848	Slane; 1833	Royal Oak; 1823	Smolensko mare
Dam Payment 1848	Slane; 1833	Orville mare 1819	Orville
Dam Payment 1848	Slane; 1833	Orville mare 1819	Epsom Lass
Dam Payment 1848	Receipt; 1836	Rowton; 1826	Oiseau
Dam Payment 1848	Receipt; 1836	Rowton; 1826	Katherina
Dam Payment 1848	Receipt; 1836	Sam mare 1826	Sam
Dam Payment 1848	Receipt; 1836	Sam mare 1826	Morel

* Dollar is inbred 4S x 4D to the stallion Catton, meaning that he appears fourth generation on the sire side of his pedigree and fourth generation on the dam side of his pedigree.
