= Comrade (horse) =

British-bred Thoroughbred racehorse

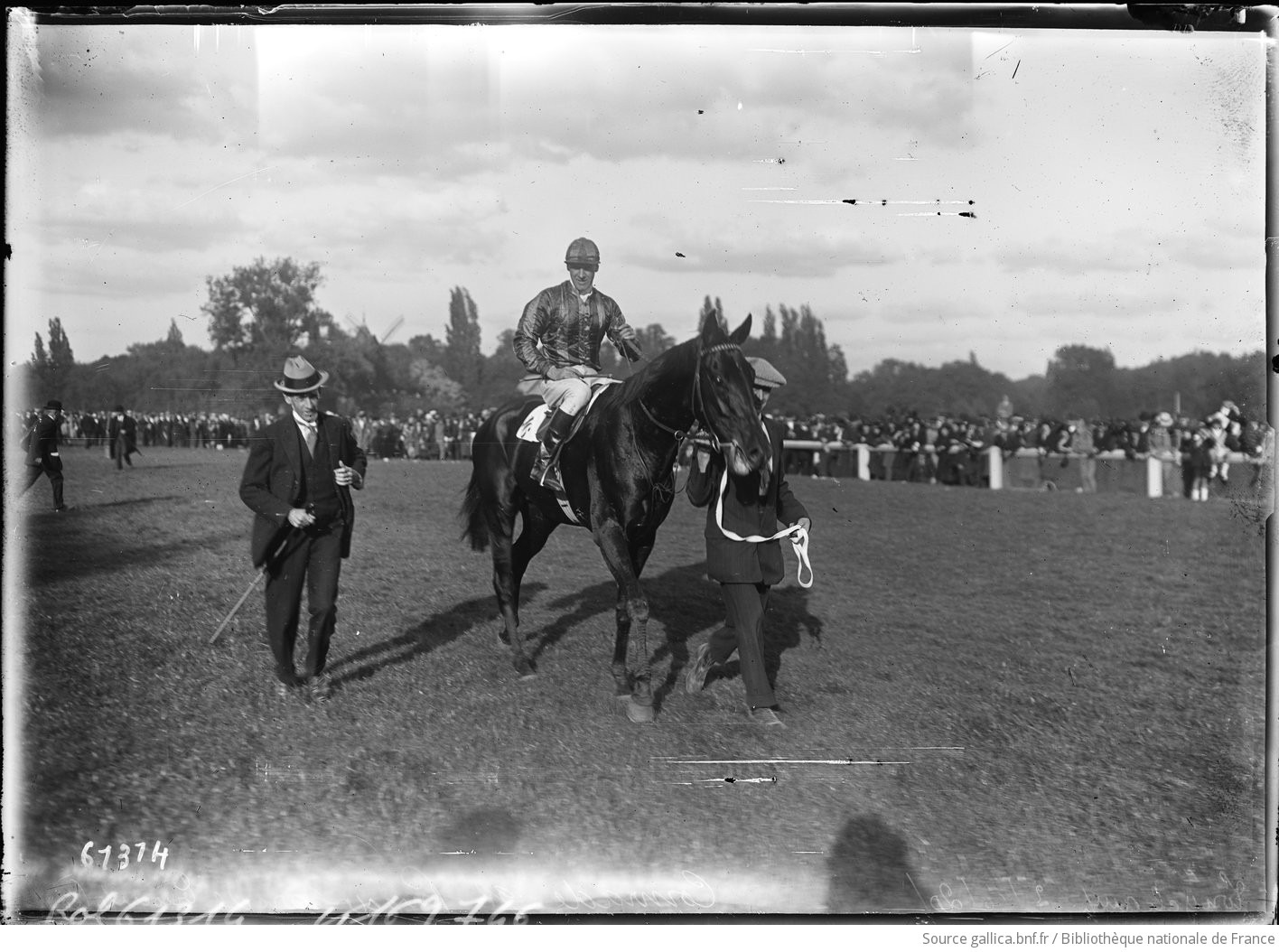
- 3 October 1920, Longchamp
- Sire: Bachelor's Double
- Grandsire: Tredennis
- Dam: Sourabaya
- Damsire: Spearmint
- Sex: Stallion
- Foaled: 1917
- Country: Great Britain
- Colour: Black
- Breeder: Ludwig Neumann
- Owner: Evremond de Saint-Alary
- Trainer: Peter Gilpin
- Record: 8: 6-1-0
- Earnings: US$79,995 (equivalent)

Major wins
- Trial Stakes (1920); Grand Prix de Paris (1920); Prix de l'Arc de Triomphe (1920)
- Last updated on 24 January 2007

Comrade (1917–1928) was the British Thoroughbred racehorse who won the first-ever run of the Prix de l'Arc de Triomphe in 1920.

Owned by the Evremond de Saint-Alary, whose stable raced in England and France, Comrade was purchased for only 26 guineas. Trained by the renowned British horse trainer, Peter Gilpin, Comrade won all three of his races as a two-year-old colt in 1919. In July 1920, the three-year-old Comrade won the most important race in France at the time, the Grand Prix de Paris. He returned to France in October, and was ridden to victory by the jockey, Frank Bullock, in the inaugural running of what is now France's most prestigious race, the Prix de l'Arc de Triomphe, beating the six-year-old King's Cross by a handsome measure of a length.

According to France Galop, Comrade was the best middle-distance runner of his generation.
