= Corrida (horse) =

French-bred Thoroughbred racehorse

- Sire: Coronach
- Grandsire: Hurry On
- Dam: Zariba
- Damsire: Sardanapale
- Sex: Mare
- Foaled: 1932
- Country: France
- Colour: Bay
- Breeder: Marcel Boussac
- Owner: Marcel Boussac. Racing colours: Orange, grey cap.
- Trainer: John E. Watts
- Record: 33: 13–?–?

Major wins
- Prix Morny (1934); Grand Prix de Marseille (1935 & 1936); Prix du Président de la République (1936); Hardwicke Stakes (1936); Prix d'Hédouville (1936); Prix de l'Arc de Triomphe (1936 & 1937); Grand Prix Prince Rose (1936 & 1937); Grosser Preis von Reichshauptstadt (1937)

Honours
- Prix Corrida at Saint-Cloud Racecourse
- Last updated on 13 November 2011

Corrida (1932 – probably 1944) was a French Thoroughbred racehorse who won races in France, Belgium, Germany and England and is regarded as one of the top fillies of the 20th century worldwide. She is best known for her back-to-back wins in France's most prestigious horse race, the Prix de l'Arc de Triomphe.

== Racing career ==
Corrida in Latin languages translates as bullfight. At age two, she won the Prix Morny and was second by a head to Pampeiro in the Grand Critérium. At age three, her owner Marcel Boussac shipped Corrida to England, where trainer George Lambton prepared her at Newmarket Racecourse. Entered in the 1,000 Guineas and The Oaks, Corrida performed poorly, and after a third lackluster effort was returned to France. There, Corrida won the Grand Prix de Marseille at Hippodrome de Marseille Borely and had three placings in major races including a third in the 1935 Prix de l'Arc de Triomphe.

In 1936, she blossomed into the most dominant horse in France. That year, Corrida won seven major races. In England, she captured the Hardwicke Stakes at Ascot Racecourse, then won the Grand Prix Prince Rose at Hippodrome Wellington, in Ostend, Belgium and in France the Grand Prix de Saint-Cloud, the Prix d'Hédouville, the Prix du Prince de Galles, and the Prix de l'Arc de Triomphe, and repeated her win in the Grand Prix de Marseille.

In 1937, Corrida returned to Belgium to win her second straight Grand International d'Ostende and traveled to Berlin, Germany, where she won the Grosser Preis von Reichshauptstadt. In October at Hippodrome de Longchamp in Paris, she continued to dominate the colts, becoming the first female horse to ever win the 1½ mile Prix de l'Arc de Triomphe twice.

== Retirement ==
Corrida was retired to her owner's Haras de Fresnay-le-Buffard breeding farm in Neuvy-au-Houlme in Lower Normandy. She was bred to the champion sire Tourbillon and in 1942 produced Coaraze, who won a number of important French races, including the Prix du Jockey Club and the Grand Prix de Saint-Cloud. Coaraze was her only offspring to survive the German occupation of France in World War II. Following the D-Day landing at Normandy by the Allied Forces, Corrida disappeared from the pasture at Haras de Fresnay-le-Buffard during the Battle of the Falaise Gap. No trace of her was ever found.
