= Le Pacha =

French-bred Thoroughbred racehorse

- Sire: Biribi
- Grandsire: Rabelais
- Dam: Advertencia
- Damsire: Ksar
- Sex: Stallion
- Foaled: 1938
- Country: France
- Colour: Bay
- Breeder: Andre Schwob
- Owner: Philippe Gund
- Trainer: John Cunnington
- Record: 12: 9-?-?
- Earnings: £15,080 (equivalent)

Major wins
- Prix Hocquart (1941); Prix Greffulhe (1941); Prix Lupin (1941); Prix du Jockey Club (1941); Grand Prix de Paris (1941); Prix Royal-Oak (1941); Prix de l'Arc de Triomphe (1941); Prix du Prince d'Orange (1942)

Honours
- Prix le Pacha at Saint-Cloud Racecourse
- Last updated on July 23, 2007

Le Pacha (foaled in 1938) was a Champion French Thoroughbred racehorse. Bred by Andre Schwob, his dam was Advertencia, a daughter of two-time Arc winner, Ksar. He was sired by Biribi who won the 1926 Prix de l'Arc de Triomphe and who was a son of the three-time Leading sire in France, Rabelais.

Raced by Philippe Gund, Le Pacha was trained by John Cunnington whose family founded the English Racing Colony in Chantilly, Oise. The dominant three-year-old in wartime France in 1941, Le Pacha went undefeated while winning the preeminent races for his age group, the Prix du Jockey Club and the then 3,000 meter Grand Prix de Paris. He followed these important wins by defeating older horses in winning the Prix de l'Arc de Triomphe, thus becoming the first of only two horses to ever win all three of the French Classic Races open to colts.

In 1942, Le Pacha's best results were a win in the Prix du Prince d'Orange and a second to Djebel in the Grand Prix de Saint-Cloud. Retired to stud duty, he met with modest success as a sire while standing at Prince Aly Khan's Haras de Saint-Crespin near Le Mesnil-Mauger in Lower Normandy.

== Sire line tree ==
- Le Pacha
  - Marco Polo
    - Macdougal
    - Polo Prince
