= Haras de Jardy =

Coordinates: 48°49′35″N 2°9′12″E

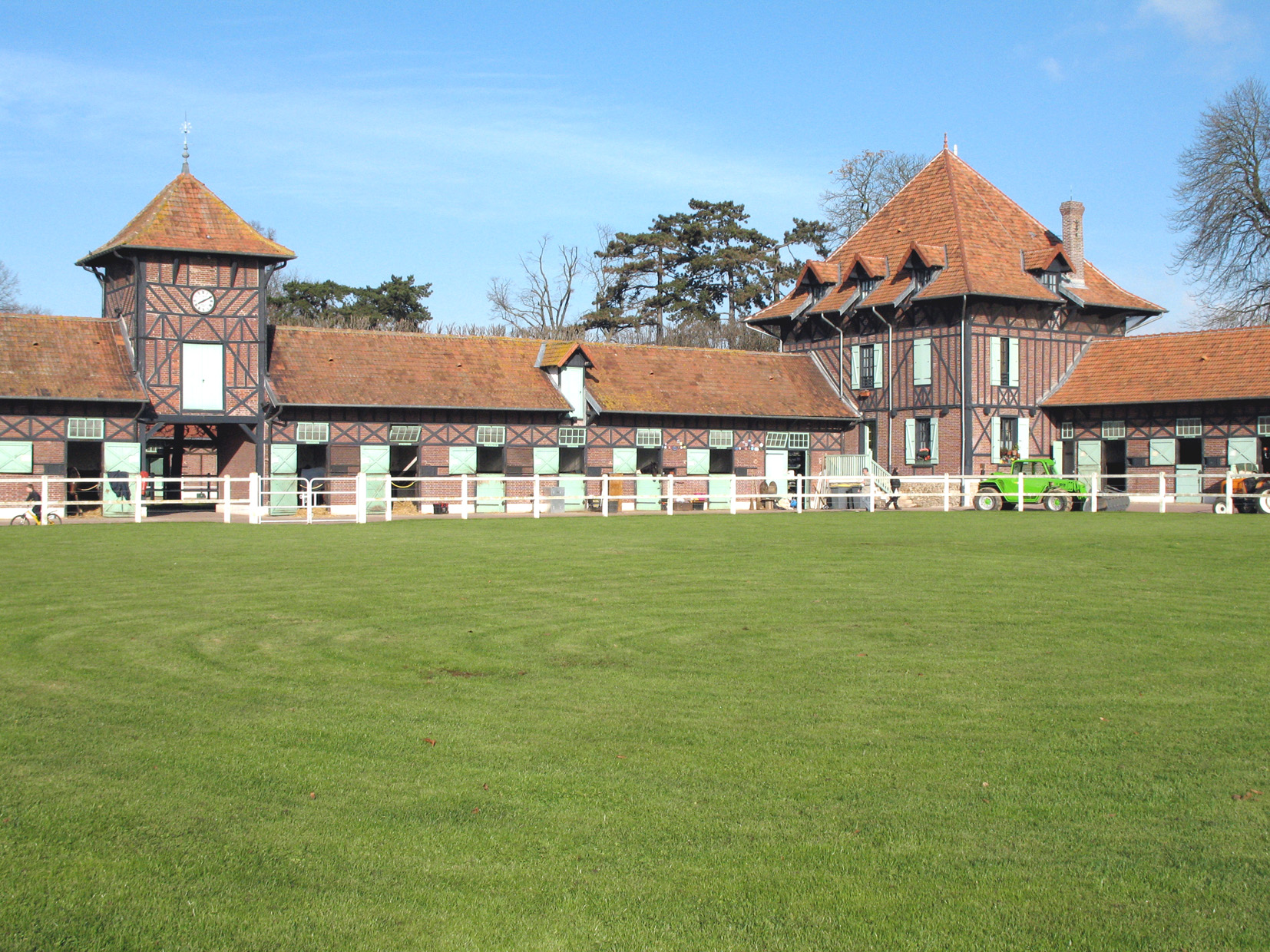
- Company type: Horse breeding, Equestrian center
- Industry: Thoroughbred Horse racing
- Founded: 1890
- Headquarters: Marnes-la-Coquette, France
- Key people: Owners: 1) Edmond Blanc; 2) Marcel Boussac; 3) Government of France

Haras de Jardy was a Thoroughbred horse breeding operation established in 1890 in Marnes-la-Coquette France by the statesman Edmond Blanc (1856-1920). The stud farm became home to many important stallions, including one of the leading sires in France and English Triple Crown Champion Flying Fox, as well as others such as Winkfield's Pride, Val d'Or, Ajax I, Teddy, Hermis and Coaltown.

Haras de Jardy gained such a reputation that it was visited by horse owners and breeders from around the world, including King Edward VII in 1905, Queen Elizabeth II in 1957 and Nikita Khrushchev in 1961. After Edmond Blanc's death in 1920, his wife operated the business. In 1920-21, her horse Ksar scored back-to-back wins in the Prix de l'Arc de Triomphe; ten years later, he was the leading sire in France.

The property was eventually sold to Marcel Boussac, who owned it until his death in 1980, after which it became the property of the government. Today, it is a public park with a golf course and home to the largest equestrian center in the country.
