= Gone to Royalty =

Canadian-bred Thoroughbred racehorse

- Sire: Royal Chocolate
- Grandsire: Amber Morn
- Dam: Bon de Barras
- Damsire: Ruritania
- Sex: Gelding
- Foaled: 1980
- Country: United States
- Colour: Dark Bay/Brown
- Breeder: North American Bloodstock Agency, Ltd.
- Owner: Pierre-Louis Lévesque
- Trainer: Jacques Dumas
- Record: 57: 12-10-10
- Earnings: $379,770

Major wins
- Display Stakes (1982); Sir Barton Stakes (1983); Autumn Handicap (1985); Fair Play Stakes (1985)

Gone to Royalty (foaled 1980 in Ontario) is a Canadian Thoroughbred race horse owned by Pierre-Louis Lévesque, son of Quebec businessman and one of Canada's preeminent racehorse owners, the late Jean-Louis Lévesque. Gone to Royalty was trained by Jacques Dumas. He was sired by Royal Chocolate (winner of 1973 Queen's Plate) out of Bon Debarras, and is half brother to Eternal Search, the 1981 Canadian Champion Sprint Horse and Canadian Champion Older Female Horse of 1982 and 1983.

Among his racing successes, Gone to Royalty was the winner of the 1982 Display Stakes and the 1983 Manitoba Derby. He finished 4th in 1983 Queen's Plate.
