= Prix du Conseil de Paris =

Flat horse race in France

- Class: Group 2
- Location: Longchamp Racecourse; Paris, France
- Inaugurated: 1893
- Race type: Flat / Thoroughbred
- Website: france-galop.com

Race information
- Distance: 2,400 metres (1 1/2 miles)
- Surface: Turf
- Track: Right-handed
- Qualification: Three-years-old and up
- Weight: 55 kg (3yo); 58 kg (4yo+); Allowances; 1 1/2 kg for fillies and mares Penalties; 3 kg for Group 1 winners * 2 kg for Group 2 winners * 1 kg for Group 3 winners * * since January 1
- Purse: €130,000 (2021); 1st: €74,100

Prix du Conseil de Paris
2025
Convergent	Dubai Honour	Yellow Jersey

Previous years
2024
Goliath	Hamish	Marquisat
2023
Iresine	Marquisat	Junko
2022
Addeybb	Monty	Kertez
2021
Seachange	Mr De Pourceaugnac	The Good Man

2020-2011
2020
Baron Samedi	Mare Australis	Eudaimonia
2019
Subway Dancer	Edisa	Silverwave
2018
Listen In	Time Shanakill	Master's Spirit
2017
Traffic Jam	Akihiro	One Foot In Heaven
2016
One Foot In Heaven	Tiberian	Now We Can
2015
Ming Dynasty	Migwar	Fate
2014
Manatee	Norse King	Bodhi
2013
Norse King	Dupontal	Childa
2012
Saga Dream	Sediciosa	Gentle Storm
2011
Vadamar	Solemia	Ivory Land

2010-2001
2010
Prince Bishop	Cirrus Des Aigles	Shimraan
2009
Cirrus Des Aigles	Makt	Shahwardi
2008
Crossharbour	Purple Moon	Poseidon Adventure
2007
Montare	Arch Rebel	Kocab
2006
Daramsar	Alix Road	Baby First
2005
Montare	Kocab	Paita
2004
Pride	Simplex	Geordieland
2003
Vallee Enchantee	Kalabar	Vangelis
2002
Ange Gabriel	Thompson Rouge	Little Rock
2001
Yavana's Pace	Epitre	Foundation Spirit

2000-1990
2000
Crimson Quest	Slew The Red	Folie Danse
1999
First Magnitude	Zarfoot	Lucido
1998
Blushing Risk	Saafeya	Kashwan
1997
Majorien	Tamure	For Valour
1996
Annaba	Poliglote	Rainbow Dancer
1995
De Quest	Slicious	Rainbow Dancer
1994
Sunshack	Monsun	Red Bishop
1993
Dancienne	Turners Hill	Vert Amande
1992
Garden Of Heaven	Fabulous Hostess	Dissimulateur
1991
Sleeping Car	Deja	Arcangues
1990
Passing Sale	Panoramic	Gasson

The Prix du Conseil de Paris is a Group 2 flat horse race in France open to thoroughbreds aged three years or older. It is run at Longchamp over a distance of 2,400 metres (about 1 1/2 miles), and it is scheduled to take place each year in October.

== History ==
The event was established in 1893, and it was originally called the Prix du Conseil Municipal. It was funded by Paris Municipal Council, which had recently signed a new leasehold of Longchamp Racecourse.

The Prix du Conseil Municipal was the second major international race introduced by the Société d'Encouragement. The first, the Grand Prix de Paris, had been launched thirty years earlier. Unlike that event, which was restricted to three-year-olds, the new race was open to horses aged three or older. The basic weights to be carried were 53 kg for three-year-olds and 58 kg for their elders. A penalty of up to 6 kg could be incurred for previous performances.

With an initial prize of 100,000 francs, the Prix du Conseil Municipal was France's second richest race after the Grand Prix de Paris. Prior to the creation of the Prix de l'Arc de Triomphe, it was the most prestigious event of Longchamp's autumn schedule.

Before World War I, the race regularly featured horses trained outside France. Three British horses were successful during this period. The event was abandoned throughout the war, with no running from 1914 to 1918. The Prix de l'Arc de Triomphe was introduced in 1920, and from this point the Prix du Conseil Municipal took place a week later. The interval was increased to a fortnight in 1925.

The race was cancelled once during World War II, in 1939. It was run at Auteuil over 2,600 metres in 1940, and at Le Tremblay over 2,300 metres in 1943 and 1944.

The present system of race grading was introduced in 1971, and the Prix du Conseil Municipal was classed at Group 2 level. It was renamed the Prix du Conseil de Paris in 1974, after reforms to the statutes of Paris.

== Records ==
Most successful horse (2 wins):

- Omnium II – 1895, 1896
- La Camargo – 1902, 1903
- Porphyros – 1940, 1942
- Kamaraan – 1974, 1975
- Montare – 2005, 2007

Leading jockey (4 wins):

- Rae Johnstone – Assuerus (1933), Vandale (1946), Espace Vital (1948), Worden (1952)
- Yves Saint-Martin – Zamazaan (1968), Recupere (1973), Sagace (1983), Lashkari (1984)

Leading trainer (8 wins):

- André Fabre – Village Star (1987), Sunshack (1994), De Quest (1995), First Magnitude (1999), Crimson Quest (2000), Crossharbour (2008), Prince Bishop (2010), Manatee (2014)

Leading owner (7 wins):

- HH Aga Khan IV – Zamazaan (1968), Kamaraan (1974, 1975), Lashkari (1984), Altayan (1986), Daramsar (2006), Vadamar (2011)

== Winners since 1978 ==
Year	Winner	Age	Jockey	Trainer	Owner	Time
1978	Noir et Or	3	Maurice Philipperon	John Cunnington Jr.	Paul de Moussac	2:34.00
1979	Salpinx	3	Philippe Paquet	François Boutin	Peter Goulandris	2:36.80
1980	En Calcat	4	Maurice Philipperon	John Cunnington Jr.	Pierre Barthe	2:41.30
1981	Rahotep	3	Jean-Luc Kessas	Bernard Sécly	Jean-Claude Weill	2:45.70
1982	Marasali	4	Alain Lequeux	Olivier Douieb	Serge Fradkoff	2:51.70
1983	Sagace	3	Yves Saint-Martin	Patrick Biancone	Daniel Wildenstein	2:33.80
1984	Lashkari	3	Yves Saint-Martin	Alain de Royer-Dupré	HH Aga Khan IV	2:46.40
1985	Jupiter Island	6	Tony Ives	Clive Brittain	Marquess of Tavistock	2:34.60
1986	Altayan	3	Olivier Poirier	Alain de Royer-Dupré	HH Aga Khan IV	2:35.10
1987	Village Star	4	Steve Cauthen	André Fabre	Tony Richards	2:44.20
1988	Her Highness	4	Richard Briard	Georges Bridgland	Georges Bridgland	2:40.50
1989	Robore	4	Alfred Gibert	Noël Pelat	Marquis de Geoffre	2:30.40
1990	Passing Sale	3	Gérald Mossé	Bernard Sécly	André Boutboul	2:35.80
1991	Sleeping Car	3	Éric Legrix	Pascal Bary	Tomokazu Iizuka	2:37.60
1992	Garden of Heaven	3	Michael Roberts	Clive Brittain	Brian Voak	2:41.00
1993	Dancienne	3	Dominique Boeuf	Élie Lellouche	Hideo Yokoyama	2:47.70
1994	Sunshack	3	Pat Eddery	André Fabre	Khalid Abdullah	2:34.50
1995	De Quest	3	Thierry Jarnet	André Fabre	Khalid Abdullah	2:27.40
1996	Annaba	3	Frankie Dettori	John Gosden	Sheikh Mohammed	2:37.20
1997	Majorien	3	Olivier Doleuze	Criquette Head	Maktoum Al Maktoum	2:37.20
1998	Blushing Risk	3	Gérald Mossé	Henri-Alex Pantall	Patricia Beck	2:49.10
1999	First Magnitude	3	Olivier Peslier	André Fabre	Daniel Wildenstein	2:35.30
2000	Crimson Quest	3	Olivier Peslier	André Fabre	Sultan Al Kabeer	2:34.40
2001	Yavana's Pace	9	Darryll Holland	Mark Johnston	Joan Keaney	2:44.40
2002	Ange Gabriel	4	Thierry Jarnet	Eric Libaud	Antonia Devin	2:40.70
2003	Vallee Enchantee	3	Dominique Boeuf	Élie Lellouche	Ecurie Wildenstein	2:29.30
2004	Pride	4	Davy Bonilla	Alain de Royer-Dupré	NP Bloodstock Ltd	2:39.10
2005	Montare	3	Christophe Lemaire	Jonathan Pease	George Strawbridge	2:32.10
2006	Daramsar	3	Christophe Soumillon	Alain de Royer-Dupré	HH Aga Khan IV	2:30.90
2007	Montare	5	Christophe Lemaire	Jonathan Pease	George Strawbridge	2:29.40
2008	Crossharbour	4	Stéphane Pasquier	André Fabre	Khalid Abdullah	2:34.70
2009	Cirrus des Aigles	3	Franck Blondel	Corine Barande-Barbe	Jean-Claude Dupouy	2:33.50
2010	Prince Bishop	3	Olivier Peslier	André Fabre	Godolphin	2:40.80
2011	Vadamar	3	Christophe Lemaire	Alain de Royer-Dupré	HH Aga Khan IV	2:32.34
2012	Saga Dream	6	Thierry Jarnet	Freddy Lemercier	Freddy Lemercier	2:47.62
2013	Norse King	4	Alexis Badel	Myriam Bollack-Badel	Jeff Smith	2:44.81
2014	Manatee	3	Maxime Guyon	André Fabre	Godolphin	2:40.96
2015	Ming Dynasty (Note: The 2015, 2016 and 2017 runnings took place at Chantilly while Longchamp was closed for redevelopment)	3	Umberto Rispoli	Mikel Delzangles	Qatar / Wildenstein	2:34.99
2016	One Foot In Heaven	4	Christophe Soumillon	Alain de Royer-Dupré	Fair Salinia Ltd	2:29.63
2017	Traffic Jam	4	Stéphane Pasquier	Nicolas Clement	Alexis Adamian	2:32.13
2018	Listen In	4	Aurelien Lemaitre	Freddy Head	George Strawbridge	2:40.83
2019	Subway Dancer	7	Radek Koplik	Zdeno Koplik	Bonanza Racing Stables	2:29.57
2020	Baron Samedi	3	Mickael Barzalona	Joseph O'Brien	LECH Racing Ltd	2:31.50
2021	Seachange	4	Maxime Guyon	Carlos Laffon-Parias	Wertheimer et Frère	2:21.01
2022	Addeybb	8	Tom Marquand	William Haggas	Ahmed Al Maktoum	2:24.49
2023	Iresine	6	Marie Velon	Jean-Pierre Gauvin	Bertrand Milliere	2:17.99
2024	Goliath	4	Christophe Soumillon	Francis-Henri Graffard	Resolute Bloodstock & Philip Baron Von Ullmann	2:28.65
2025	Convergent	3	Clifford Lee	Karl Burke	Newtown Anner Stud Farm Ltd	2:17.02
2026	Rembrand To Go	4	Marvin Grandin	Miroslav Rulec	Christian Bockelmann & Ralf Schlesiger	2:13.59

== Earlier winners ==
- 1893: Callistrate
- 1894: Best Man
- 1895: Omnium II
- 1896: Omnium II
- 1897: Winkfield's Pride
- 1898: Gardefeu
- 1899: Libaros
- 1900: Codoman
- 1901: Kilmarnock
- 1902: La Camargo
- 1903: La Camargo
- 1904: Presto
- 1905: Macdonald II
- 1906: Maintenon
- 1907: Luzerne
- 1908: Biniou
- 1909: Hag to Hag
- 1910: Ossian
- 1911: Basse Pointe
- 1912: Shannon
- 1913: Nimbus
- 1914–18: no race
- 1919: Loisir
- 1920: Meddlesome Maid
- 1921: Flechois
- 1922: Le Prodige
- 1923: Dauphin
- 1924: Tricard
- 1925: Nid d'Or
- 1926: Olibrius
- 1927: Cerulea
- 1928: Balmoral
- 1929: Motrico
- 1930: Erodion
- 1931: Sans Ame
- 1932: Macaroni
- 1933: Assuerus
- 1934: Cadmus
- 1935: Come In
- 1936: Cousine
- 1937: Sanguinetto
- 1938: Nica
- 1939: no race
- 1940: Porphyros
- 1941: Horatius
- 1942: Porphyros
- 1943: Royalhunter
- 1944: Galene
- 1945: Basileus
- 1946: Vandale
- 1947: Goyama
- 1948: Espace Vital
- 1949: Vela
- 1950: Violoncelle
- 1951:
- 1952: Worden
- 1953: Savoyard
- 1954: Clochard
- 1955: Mahan
- 1956: Arcadius
- 1957: Thila
- 1958: Tombeur
- 1959: Blue Net
- 1960: Astana
- 1961: Carteret
- 1962: Arcor
- 1963: Nyrcos
- 1964: Timmy Lad
- 1965: Hammam
- 1966: Pasquin
- 1967: Bagdad
- 1968: Zamazaan
- 1969: Karabas
- 1970: Armos
- 1971: Ex Libris
- 1972: Monsieur D
- 1973: Recupere
- 1974: Kamaraan
- 1975: Kamaraan
- 1976: On My Way
- 1977: Monseigneur

== See also ==
- List of French flat horse races
- Recurring sporting events established in 1893 – this race is included under its original title, Prix du Conseil Municipal.
