= Royal Chocolate =

Canadian-bred Thoroughbred racehorse

- Sire: Amber Morn
- Grandsire: Ambiorix
- Dam: Rocket Shot
- Damsire: Prince John
- Sex: Stallion
- Foaled: 1970
- Country: Canada
- Colour: Chestnut
- Breeder: Stafford Farms
- Owner: Stafford Farms
- Trainer: Gil Rowntree
- Record: 55: 13-12-11
- Earnings: $245,976

Major wins
- Plate Trial Stakes (1973); Eclipse Handicap (1974, 1975); Bold Venture Handicap (1976); Connaught Cup Handicap (1976); Canadian Classic Race wins: Queen's Plate (1973)

Royal Chocolate (foaled 1970 in Ontario) was a Canadian Thoroughbred racehorse who won the 1973 Queen's Plate, the oldest continuous race in North America and Canada's most prestigious horse race.

== Background ==
Royal Chocolate was bred and raced by Jack Stafford's Stafford Farms of King City, Ontario. He was sired by Amber Morn whose French sire Ambiorix stood at Claiborne Farm and who was a son of the important three-time French Champion sire, Tourbillon. Royal Chocolate's dam Rocket Shot, was a granddaughter of the influential sire, Princequillo.

Royal Chocolate was conditioned for racing by future by Canadian Racing Hall of Fame trainer, Gil Rowntree.

== Racing career ==
During his career, he competed at distances from five to fourteen furlongs but is best known for winning Canada's most prestigious race in 1973, the mile and a quarter (10 furlongs) Queen's Plate. In the ensuing second leg of the Canadian Triple Crown series, he ran third to stablemate Tara Road in the Prince of Wales Stakes on the turf at Fort Erie Racetrack

== Stud record ==
Retired to stud duty after a successful 1976 racing season, as a sire Royal Chocolate met with reasonable success. Among his offspring, Gone to Royalty was a multiple stakes winner. His last foals were born in 1994.
