= Grande Prêmio Derby Paulista =

G1 horse race in Brazil

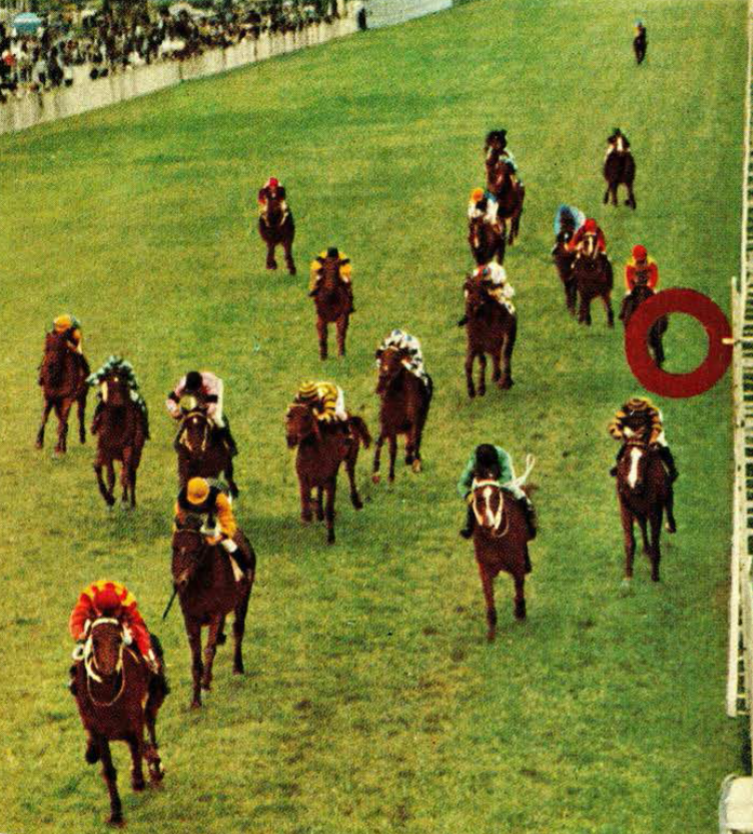
- Finish of the 1969 Grande Prêmio Derby Paulista
- Class: Group 1
- Inaugurated: 1917
- Race type: Flat / Thoroughbred

Race information
- Distance: 2,400 metres (1.5 mi)
- Surface: Turf
- Track: Hipódromo de Cidade Jardim
- Qualification: Three-year-old colts

The Grande Prêmio Derby Paulista is a Group 1 flat horse race in Brazil open to three-year-old colts run over a distance of 2400 metres (1.5 mi) on the turf at Hipódromo de Cidade Jardim in São Paulo. It is the third and final leg of the São Paulo Triple Crown.

== History ==
The Grande Prêmio Derby Paulista was first run in 1917 in the Hipódromo da Mooca. In 1941, the race moved to its current location at the Hipódromo de Cidade Jardim.

Originally, the Grande Prêmio Derby Paulista was limited to only horses bred in São Paulo and Paraná. In 1963, it was opened to all Brazilian-breds.

By 1998, the race was open to all horses.

In 2019, the race was closed to fillies and restricted to colts only.

== Records ==
Speed record:

- 2:24.299 – Tenarin (2009)

Largest margin of victory (since 2005):

- 6 3/4 lengths – Xiu Xu Lin (2010)
- 6 1/4 lengths – Havana Cigar (2025)
- 5 1/4 lengths – Halston (2018)

Most wins by a jockey (since 1961, incomplete):

- 3 – E. Le Mener Filho (1975, 1978, 1979)

Most wins by a trainer (since 1961, incomplete):

- 4 – Emerson Garcia (2016, 2022, 2025, 2026)
- 3 – Amazilio Magalhães (1971, 1984, 1996)
- 3 – A. S. Ventura (1975, 1978, 1981)
- 3 – A. Cabreira (1977, 1979, 1983)

Most wins by an owner (since 1961):

- 3 – Haras Faxina (1971, 1984, 1994)

Most wins by a breeder (since 1961):

- 5 – Haras Santa Maria de Araras (1987, 1988, 2006, 2011, 2024)
- 4 – Haras Malurica (1979, 1982, 1990, 1998)
- 4 – Haras Old Friends (2007, 2016, 2025, 2026)
- 3 – Haras Faxina (1971, 1984, 1994)
- 3 – Haras Bandeirantes (1995, 1996, 2000)
- 3 – Haras Valente (2001, 2004, 2013)

== Winners since 1961 ==
Year	Winner	Jockey	Trainer	Owner	Breeder	Time	Margin	Ref
2026	Intelectual	A.C Silva	Emerson Garcia	Stud Orit	Haras Old Friends LTDA	2:33.864	Head	
2025	Havana Cigar	R. Viana	Emerson Garcia	Haras Fazenda Boa Vista	Haras Old Friends LTDA	2:26.758	6 1/4 lengths	
2024	Navio Fantasma	L. Henrique	Z. M. Rosa	Stud A.M.L.	Haras Santa Maria de Araras	2:29.447	4 1/4 lengths	
2023	Cold Heart	J. Severo	M. F. Gusso	Fazenda Mondesir	Fazenda Mondesir	2:25.065	1/2 head	
2022	Karl Marx	F. Larroque	Emerson Garcia	Stud Magia	Stud Magia	2:29.261	3/4 length	
2021	Planetario	W. Blandi	L. Esteves	Stud Red Rafa	Stud Red Rafa	2:26.442	1 3/4 lengths	
2020	Own Them	Alex Mota	Edgar Araújo	Castellano Stud & Stud My Hero Dad	Castellano Stud	2:30.620	2 lengths	
2019	Não da Mais	C. Lavor	A. F. Barbosa	Haras Phillipson	Haras Phillipson	2:27.361	3 3/4 lengths	
2018	Halston	N. A. Santos	D. L. Albres	Haras Cifra	Haras Cifra	2:25.682	5 1/4 lengths	
2017	Galope Americano	A. L. Silva	D. L. Albres	Stud Galope	Haras Cifra	2:28.926	1 3/4 lengths	
2016	Vettori Kin	V. Leal	Emerson Garcia	Stud TNT & Haras Old Friends	Haras Old Friends	2:30.928	3 1/4 lengths	
2015	Reality Bites	A. Mesquita	W. G. Tosta	Ramiro Curi de Lemos	Haras Interlagos	2:30.537	1/4 length	
2014	Bonaparte	V. Leal	V. Nahid	Stud TNT	Stud TNT	2:28.593	4 3/4 lengths	
2013	Fixador	A. Queiroz	M. F. Gusso	Stud Vicenza	Haras Valente	2:28.226	1/2 head	
2012	Gober	N. A. Santos	R. Soares	Stud Red Rafa	Stud Red Rafa	2:28.537	1/4 length	
2011	Veraneio	F. Leandro	N. Souza	Stud Power Five	Haras Santa Maria de Araras	2:25.603	1 1/2 lengths	
2010	Xiu Xu Lin	A. C. Silva	E. Petrochinski	José Renato Cruz e Tucci	Haras Pirassununga	2:28.266	6 3/4 lengths	
2009	Tenarin	F. Leandro	A. L. Cintra	Stud C&T	Fazenda e Haras Calunga Agro Pec.	2:24.59	Multiple lengths	
2008	Negro da Gaita	M. Cardoso	Dulcino Guignoni	Coudelaria Jéssica	Stud Mega	2:31.80	Head	
2007	Mr. Universo	A. M. Souza	S. Lobo	Stud Farda Amiga	Haras Old Friends	2:29.634	2 lengths	
2006	Quick Road	Nelito Cunha	João Macedo	Stud JCM	Haras Santa Maria de Araras	2:28.439	1 1/2 lengths	
2005	Core Business	Geraldo Assis	E. Roldão	Stud Piccollino	Haras Santa Verônica	2:29.9	1 length	
2004	Urodonal	Alex Mota	Pedro Nickel Filho	Haras Valente	Haras Valente	2:28.3		
2003	Coquetel		C. G. Tavares	Stud Renato	Haras J. B. Barros	2:25.0		
2002	Guacho		O. Jeronimo	Gianni Franco Samaja	Haras Novo Mossoró	2:28.0		
2001	Roxinho			Stud Taj-Mahal	Haras Valente	2:28.6		
2000	Expressivo Willie		Amazilio Magalhães Filho	Agropasotril Ricci	Haras Bandeirantes	2:25.3		
1999	Puerto-Madero		S. Lobo	Haras Moema	Haras Guaiuvira	2:26.38		
1998	Ballxiza		José Martins Alves	Haras Terra Branca/Leon Friedberg Rozlawka	Haras Malurica	2:26.9		
1997	Quari Bravo		E. Sampaio	Benjamin Steinbruch	Haras Phillipson	2:27.1		
1996	Alvo Certo		Amazilio Magalhães	Antonio de Toledo Lara Neto	Haras Bandeirantes	2:26.13		
1995	Ze Corredo		Amazilio Magalhães Filho	Haras Bandeirantes	Haras Bandeirantes	2:31.6		
1994	Franz Post		Luiz Antonio Singnoretti	Haras Faxina	Haras Faxina	2:28.6		
1993	Pia-Vovo		João C. Avila	Haras Petin	Haras Rio das Pedras	2:29.2		
1992	Palemon		M. Olguin	Stud Gold Red	Haras São Luiz	2:32.4		
1991	Pour Henri		A. Andretta	Stud Crespi	Haras Calunga	2:27.1		
1990	Thignon Lafre		A. Oliveira	Haras Malurica	Haras Malurica	2:28.3		
1989	Cacique Negro		L. V. Camargo	Haras Porto Seguro	Haras Porto Seguro	2:34.0		
1988	Troyanos		W. P. Lavor	Haras Santa Maria de Araras	Haras Santa Maria de Araras	2:29.4		
1987	Satyr		I. C. Souza	Haras Santa Maria de Araras	Haras Santa Maria de Araras	2:32.1		
1986	Jabble		M. R. Campos	Stud Artung	Haras São Luiz	2:30.1		
1985	Grimaldi	W. Carvalho	J. B. Nogueira	Delmar Biazoli Martins	Haras Morumbi	2:29.9	1 length	
1984	Rabat	G. Meneses	Amazilio Magalhães	Haras Faxina	Haras Faxina	2:29.5	Neck	
1983	Immensity ƒ	A. Bolino	A. Cabreira	Haras Ponta Porã	Haras Ponta Porã	2:29.4	1 length	
1982	Kigrandi	L. Saldanha	A. Oliveira	Stud Tevere	Haras Malurica	2:34.3	4 lengths	
1981	Del Garbo	J. Silva	A. S. Ventura	Stud Montecatini	Haras São Quirino	2:30.0	1/2 length	
1980	Campal	I. Quintana	P. Nickel	Haras Rio das Pedras	Haras Rio das Pedras	2:28.9	3 lengths	
1979†	Hérsio Kidd	L. A. Pereira	A. Andretta	Haras Malurica	Haras Malurica	2:32.1	Dead heat	
1979†	Dark Brown	E. Le Mener Filho	A. Cabreira	Haras Rosa do Sul	Haras Rosa do Sul	2:32.1	Dead heat	
1978	Baleal	E. Le Mener Filho	A. S. Ventura	Stud Montecatini	Agro-Pastoril Haras São Luiz S.A.	2:35.0	3/4 length	
1977	Chubasco	I. Quintana	A. Cabreira	Armando Anastacio	Haras Ponta Porã (Mato Grosso)	2:37.0	5 lengths	
1976	Agente	R. Penachio	O. Ulloa	Agrícola e Comercial Haras João Jabour	Agrícola e Comercial Haras João Jabour	2:29.9	1 length	
1975	Fitz Emilius	E. Le Mener Filho	A. S. Ventura	Roberto Gabizo de Faria	Haras São Lazaro	2:32.2	1 1/2 lengths	
1974	Grão de Bico	J. Pinto	J. A. Limeira	Courdelaria F.A.N.	Courdelaria F.A.N.	2:31.4	2 1/2 lengths	
1973	Uleanto	J. Borja	Edmundo Campozani Filho	Augusto Bove	Haras Jahu e Rio das Pedras	2:32.2	1 1/2 lengths	
1972	Nicho	J. P. Martins	Walter Marraccini	Stud Ouro Azul	Haras Mondesir	2:35.6	1 1/4 lengths	
1971	Eylau	O. Nobre	Amazilio Magalhães	Haras Faxina	Haras Faxina	2:28.1	3 lengths	
1970	Don Jurandir	E. M. Bueno	Anisio Andretta	Antonio Zen	Haras Rio Verde	2:33.9	4 lengths	
1969	Castão	J. Fagundes	Milton Signoretti	Stud Hanna	Haras Rio Verde	2:30.5	2 1/2 lengths	
1968	Quiz	A. Barroso	Joaquim Amorim Filho	Haras São Bernardo	Haras São Bernardo	2:34.4	2 lengths	
1967	Giant	Ermelino Sampaio	Pedro Nickel	Haras Palmital	Haras Palmital	2:35.6	2 lengths	
1966	Dilema	João Manoel Amorim	Jorge Oliveira Jr.	Stud Maioral	Haras Terra Branca	1:31.7	1 length	
1965	Kacônio	José Alves	Joaquim Bueno Gonçalves	Stud Jaraguá	Haras São Luiz	1:30.2	3 lengths	
1964	Egoismo	Carlito Taborda	Mário de Almeida	Zélia G. Peixoto de Castro	Haras Mondesir	1:32.6	1 length	
1963	Quibor	José Alves	Raul Urbina	Stud Otro Lance	Haras Paraná	1:37.3	1 1/4 lengths	
1962	Fulgente	Alekisiam Artin	Waldemar de Paula Mendos	Stud Guarã	Henrique Basto Filho	1:32.2	Nose	
1961	Emerson	Francisco Irigoyen	F. Dávila	Roberto e Nelson Seabra	Roberto e Nelson Seabra	1:32		

ƒ designates a filly

† In 1979, Hérsio Kidd and Dark Brown finished in a dead heat

== Earlier winners ==
- 1917: Sunrise II
- 1918: Jaccuse ƒ
- 1919: Diavolo
- 1920: Bronzino
- 1921: Fandango
- 1922: Paulistano
- 1923: Heru
- 1924: Fortunio
- 1925: Boi Tata
- 1926: Karatan
- 1927: Gil-Glas
- 1928: Eldorado
- 1929: Festeiro
- 1930: Jequitiba
- 1931: Xyleno
- 1932: Young
- 1933: Jacutinga ƒ
- 1934: Veneziano
- 1935: Organdi ƒ
- 1936: Funny Boy
- 1937: Malfa ƒ
- 1938: Negus ƒ
- 1939: Amilcar
- 1940: Big Shot
- 1941: Carim
- 1942: Vatapa
- 1943: El Faro
- 1944: Estouvado
- 1945: Flying Wonder
- 1946: Helíaco
- 1947: Juazeiro
- 1948: Jabuti
- 1949: Falindor
- 1950: Faaimbe
- 1951: Ninho
- 1952: Jaceguay
- 1953: Joiosa ƒ
- 1954: Adil
- 1955: Timão
- 1956: Caporal
- 1957: Vandalo
- 1958: Guadeamus
- 1959: Farwell
- 1960: Garboleto

ƒ designates a filly
