= Prix du Prince d'Orange =

Flat horse race in France

- Class: Group 3
- Location: Longchamp Racecourse; Paris, France
- Inaugurated: 1882
- Race type: Flat / Thoroughbred
- Website: france-galop.com

Race information
- Distance: 2,000 metres (1¼ miles)
- Surface: Turf
- Track: Right-handed
- Qualification: Three-year-olds
- Weight: 58 kg Allowances; 1½ kg for fillies
- Purse: €80,000 (2021); 1st: €40,000

Prix du Prince d'Orange
2025
Croix Du Nord	Daryz	Nahraan

Previous years
2024
Ombudsman	Start Of Day	Supercooled
2023
Horizon Dore	Mr Moliere	Birr Castle
2022
West Wind Blows	Ilic	Epic Poet
2021
Saiydabad	Lord Charming	Gregolimo

2020-2011
2020
Chachnak	Hurricane Dream	Grocer Jack
2019
Soudania	Queen	Goya Senora
2018
Ghaiyyath	Sacred Life	Folamour
2017
Recoletos	Plumatic	Afandem
2016
Sky Kingdom	Mekhtaal	Spectroscope
2015
Karaktar	Sumbal	Not So Sleepy
2014
Free Port Lux	Bodhi	Calling Out
2013
Intello	Morandi	Zhiyi
2012
Starboard	Prince Mag	Albion
2011
Casamento	Barocci	Desert Blanc

2010-2001
2010
Prince Bishop	Wealthy	Rajsaman
2009
Cirrus Des Aigles	World Heritage	Allybar
2008
Never On Sunday	Russian Cross	Trincot
2007
Literato	Indian Choice	Anabaa's Creation
2006
Best Name	Champs Elysees	Daramsar
2005
Corre Caminos	Ruwi	Kendor Dine
2004
Delfos	Apsis	Lyonels Glory
2003
Weightless	Shakis	Touch Of Land
2002
Tau Ceti	Shaanmer	Without Connexion
2001
Equerry	Sagacity	Poussin

2000-1990
2000
Hightori	Bleu D'Altair	Rhenium
1999
State Shinto	Way Of Light	Manndar
1998
Quel Senor	Barbola	Sestino
1997
Loup Sauvage	Bonapartiste	Handsome Ridge
1996
Baroud D'Honneur	Android	Acharne
1995
Tamure	Spectrum	Rifapour
1994
Millkom	Volochine	Sand Reef
1993
Apple Tree	Marildo	Jackdidi
1992
Arcangues	Prince Polino	Arazi
1991
Passing Sale	Miss Alleged	Glity
1990
Saumarez	Mister Riv	Creator

The Prix du Prince d'Orange is a group-3 flat horse race in France open to three-year-old thoroughbreds. It is run at Longchamp over a distance of 2,000 metres (about 1¼ miles), and it is scheduled to take place each year in September.

== History ==
The event is named after William of Orange (1840–1879), the eldest son of William III of the Netherlands. The Prince became a member of the Jockey-Club de Paris in 1863, and took up racehorse ownership shortly before his death.

The Prix du Prince d'Orange was established in 1882. It was originally open to horses aged three or older and contested at Longchamp over 2,400 metres.

The race was abandoned throughout World War I, with no running from 1914 to 1918. It was cancelled twice during World War II, in 1939 and 1940. It was run at Le Tremblay over 2,200 metres in 1943 and 1944.

The event's regular distance was cut to 2,200 metres in 1963. It was shortened to 2,000 metres in 1972. The race was restricted to three-year-olds in 1994.

The Prix du Prince d'Orange sometimes serves as a trial for the Prix de l'Arc de Triomphe. Five horses have won both races in the same year. The first was Ksar in 1922, and the most recent was Saumarez in 1990.

== Records ==
Most successful horse (2 wins):

- Azur – 1883, 1884
- Fra Angelico – 1892, 1893
- Omnium II – 1895, 1896
- Biniou – 1908, 1909
- Cadum – 1924, 1925
- Motrico – 1930, 1932
- Tanerko – 1956, 1957
- Lovely Dancer – 1983, 1984

Leading jockey (6 wins):

- George Stern – Caius (1904), Biniou (1908, 1909), Gros Papa (1910, dead-heat), Floraison (1912), Dagor (1913)
- Freddy Head – Goodly (1969), Hallez (1971), Ivanjica (1976), Carwhite (1977), Lovely Dancer (1983), Triptych (1988)

Leading trainer (8 wins):

- André Fabre – Cariellor (1985, dead-heat), In the Wings (1989), Arcangues (1992), Apple Tree (1993), Loup Sauvage (1997), State Shinto (1999), Prince Bishop (2010), Intello (2013)

Leading owner (5 wins):

- Édouard de Rothschild – Floraison (1912), Cadum (1924, 1925), Brantome (1935), Gonfalonier (1937)

== Winners since 1976 ==
Year	Winner	Age	Jockey	Trainer	Owner	Time
1976	Ivanjica	4	Freddy Head	Alec Head	Jacques Wertheimer
1977	Carwhite	3	Freddy Head	Alec Head	Jacques Wertheimer
1978	Alleged	4	Lester Piggott	Vincent O'Brien	Robert Sangster	2:02.30
1979	Rusticaro	4	Yves Saint-Martin	Richard Carver Jr.	Brendan Kelly
1980	Dunette	4	Georges Doleuze	E. Chevalier du Fau	Mrs Harry Love
1981	Vayrann	3	Yves Saint-Martin	François Mathet	Aga Khan IV
1982	General Holme	3	Alain Lequeux	Olivier Douieb	Khalid Abdullah
1983	Lovely Dancer	3	Freddy Head	Olivier Douieb	Jacki Clérico
1984	Lovely Dancer	4	Alain Lequeux	Olivier Douieb	Jacki Clérico
1985 (dh)	Cariellor; Romildo	4; 5	Lester Piggott; Cash Asmussen	André Fabre; François Boutin	Suzy Volterra; Gerry Oldham
1986	Fitnah	4	Gary W. Moore	Criquette Head	Miss H. Al Maktoum
1987	Groom Dancer	3	Dominique Boeuf	Tony Clout	Marvin Warner	2:16.70
1988	Triptych (Note: Lesotho finished first in 1988, but he was relegated to last place following a stewards' inquiry)	6	Freddy Head	Patrick Biancone	Peter Brant	2:04.90
1989	In the Wings	3	Cash Asmussen	André Fabre	Sheikh Mohammed	2:12.50
1990	Saumarez	3	Gérald Mossé	Nicolas Clément	Bruce McNall	2:11.50
1991	Passing Sale	4	David Bouland	Bernard Sécly	André Boutboul	2:10.50
1992	Arcangues	4	Thierry Jarnet	André Fabre	Daniel Wildenstein	2:07.50
1993	Apple Tree	4	Thierry Jarnet	André Fabre	Paul de Moussac	2:14.80
1994	Millkom	3	Jean-René Dubosc	Jean-Claude Rouget	Jean-Claude Gour	2:12.30
1995	Tamure	3	Frankie Dettori	John Gosden	Sheikh Mohammed	2:25.90
1996	Baroud d'Honneur	3	Franck Blondel	Jean-François Bernard	Axelle Nègre	2:17.50
1997	Loup Sauvage	3	Olivier Peslier	André Fabre	Daniel Wildenstein	2:14.00
1998	Quel Senor	3	Gérald Mossé	François Doumen	John Martin	2:11.60
1999	State Shinto	3	Thierry Jarnet	André Fabre	Sheikh Mohammed	2:12.50
2000	Hightori	3	Gérald Mossé	Philippe Demercastel	Ecurie Bader	2:11.00
2001	Equerry	3	Jamie Spencer	Saeed bin Suroor	Godolphin	2:10.40
2002	Tau Ceti	3	Thierry Jarnet	John Hammond	Niarchos Family	2:13.00
2003	Weightless	3	Thierry Thulliez	Pascal Bary	Khalid Abdullah	2:05.90
2004	Delfos	3	Miguel Blancpain	Carlos Laffon-Parias	Leonidas Marinopoulos	2:09.40
2005	Corre Caminos	3	Thierry Jarnet	Mikel Delzangles	Marquesa de Moratalla	2:07.80
2006	Best Name	3	Christophe Lemaire	Robert Collet	Paul Vidal	2:14.10
2007	Literato	3	Christophe Lemaire	Jean-Claude Rouget	Hervé Morin	2:07.30
2008	Never on Sunday	3	Christophe Lemaire	Jean-Claude Rouget	Daniel-Yves Trèves	2:06.30
2009	Cirrus des Aigles	3	Franck Blondel	Corine Barande-Barbe	Jean-Claude Dupouy	2:06.30
2010	Prince Bishop	3	Maxime Guyon	André Fabre	Godolphin	2:09.60
2011	Casamento	3	Mickael Barzalona	Mahmood Al Zarooni	Godolphin	2:06.70
2012	Starboard	3	Christophe Soumillon	John Gosden	Khalid Abdullah	2:16.70
2013	Intello	3	Olivier Peslier	André Fabre	Wertheimer et Frère	2:12.23
2014	Free Port Lux	3	Mickael Barzalona	Freddy Head	Olivier Thomas	2:12.67
2015	Karaktar	3	Christophe Soumillon	Alain de Royer-Dupré	Aga Khan IV	2:13.35
2016	Sky Kingdom (Note: The 2016 and 2017 races took place at Maisons-Laffitte while Longchamp was closed for redevelopment)	3	Gérald Mosse	William Haggas	Paul Makin	2:10.84
2017	Recoletos	3	Olivier Peslier	Carlos Laffon-Parias	Sarl Darpat France	2:14.30
2018	Ghaiyyath	3	William Buick	Charlie Appleby	Godolphin	2:08.71
2019	Soudania	3	Aurelien Lemaitre	Freddy Head	Wertheimer et Frère	2:05.13
2020	Chachnak	3	Mickael Barzalona	Fabrice Vermeulen	La Vallee Martigny Earl / Des Mouettes	2:06.09
2021	Saiydabad	3	Christophe Soumillon	Jean-Claude Rouget	Aga Khan IV	2:08.49
2022	West Wind Blows	3	Kieran Shoemark	Simon & Ed Crisford	Abdulla Al Mansoori	2:04.13
2023	Horizon Dore	3	Cristian Demuro	Patrice Cottier	Gousserie Racing, Ecurie Du Sud et al	2:04.62
2024	Ombudsman	3	William Buick	John & Thady Gosden	Godolphin	2:11.42
2025	Croix du Nord	3	Yuichi Kitamura	Takashi Saito	Sunday Racing	2:11.69

== Earlier winners ==
- 1882: Octave
- 1883: Azur
- 1884: Azur
- 1885: Plaisanterie
- 1886: Fricandeau
- 1887: Tenebreuse
- 1888: Athos
- 1889: Achille
- 1890: Wandora
- 1891: Espion
- 1892: Fra Angelico
- 1893: Fra Angelico
- 1894: Ravioli
- 1895: Omnium II
- 1896: Omnium II
- 1897: Launay
- 1898: Gardefeu
- 1899: Jeanne Brunette
- 1900: Fourire
- 1901: Arkinglass
- 1902: La Camargo
- 1903: Maximum
- 1904: Caius
- 1905: Presto
- 1906: Montlieu
- 1907: Bethsaida
- 1908: Biniou
- 1909: Biniou
- 1910: Gros Papa / Ronde de Nuit *
- 1911: Alcantara
- 1912: Floraison
- 1913: Dagor
- 1914–18: no race
- 1919: Tullamore
- 1920: Cid Campeador
- 1921: Harpocrate
- 1922: Ksar
- 1923: Guercoeur
- 1924: Cadum
- 1925: Cadum
- 1926: Masked Ruler
- 1927: Sac a Papier
- 1928: Finglas
- 1929: Kantar
- 1930: Motrico
- 1931: Lovelace
- 1932: Motrico
- 1933: Phlegeton
- 1934: Negundo
- 1935: Brantome
- 1936: Arkina
- 1937: Gonfalonier
- 1938: Vatellor
- 1939: no race
- 1940: no race
- 1941: Macaron
- 1942: Le Pacha
- 1943: Guirlande / Norseman *
- 1944: Folle Nuit
- 1945: Micipsa
- 1946: Achille
- 1947: Oviedo
- 1948: Yong Lo
- 1949:
- 1950: Medium
- 1951: Florian
- 1952: Silnet
- 1953: Worden
- 1954: Banassa
- 1955: Cordova
- 1956: Tanerko
- 1957: Tanerko
- 1958: Chief
- 1959: Herbager
- 1960: Charlottesville
- 1961: Wordpam
- 1962: Kistinie
- 1963: Soltikoff
- 1964: Le Fabuleux
- 1965: Diatome
- 1966: Pasquin
- 1967: Carmarthen
- 1968: Petrone
- 1969: Goodly
- 1970: A Chara
- 1971: Hallez
- 1972: Mister Sic Top
- 1973: Toujours Pret
- 1974: On My Way
- 1975: Kasteel

* The 1910 and 1943 races were dead-heats and have joint winners.

== See also ==
- List of French flat horse races
