= Motrico (horse) =

French-bred Thoroughbred racehorse

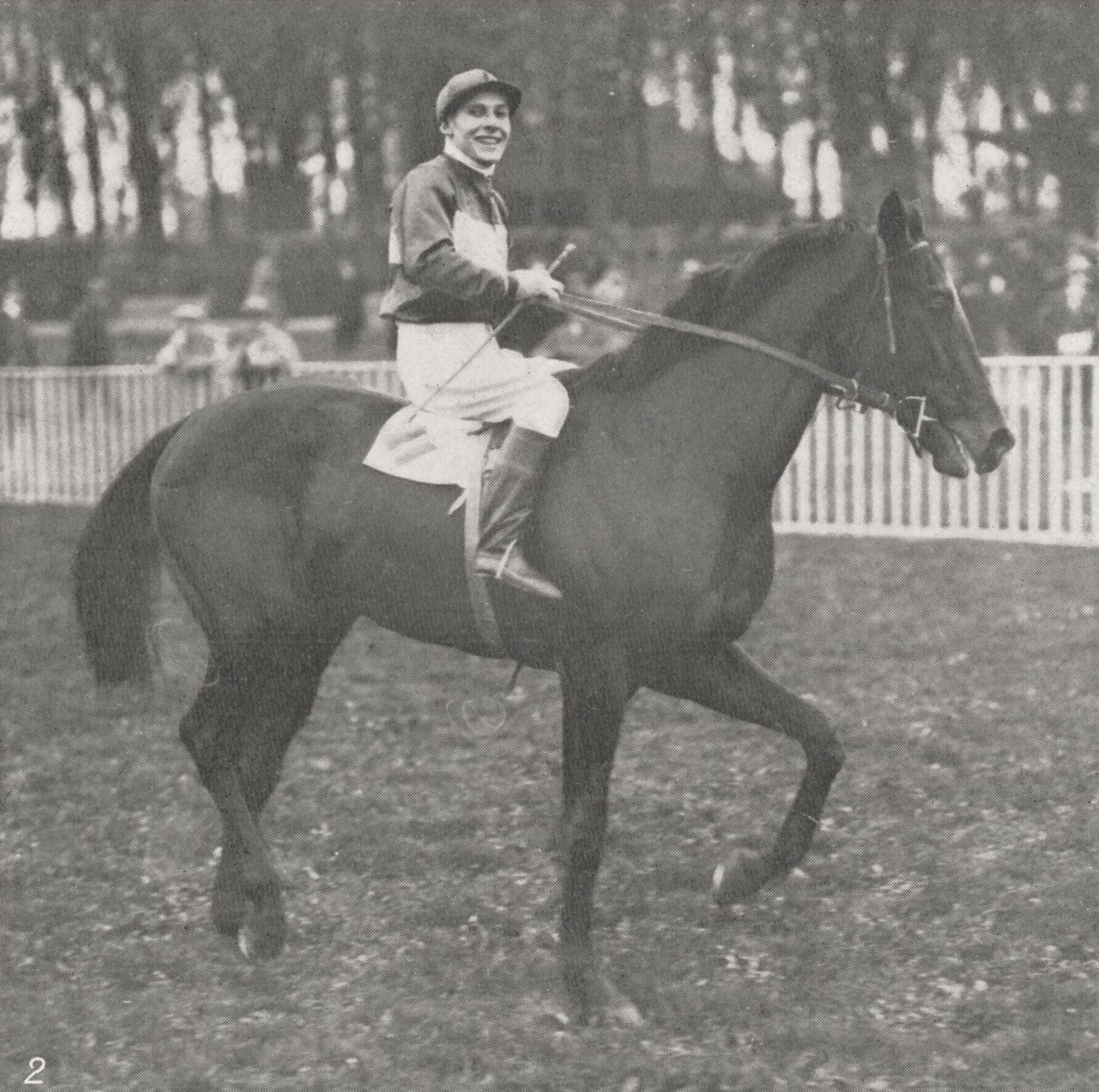
- Critérium de Saint-Cloud (5 Nov 1927)
- Sire: Radames
- Grandsire: Rabelais
- Dam: Martigues
- Damsire: Doricles
- Sex: Stallion
- Foaled: 1925
- Country: France
- Colour: Bay
- Breeder: Maurice Labrouche
- Owner: Vicomte Max de Rivaud
- Trainer: Maurice d'Okhuysen

Major wins
- Critérium de Saint-Cloud (1927); Prix Miss Gladiator (1928); Prix Boiard (1928); Prix du Conseil Municipal (1929); Prix de Reux (1930); Prix du Prince d'Orange (1930 & 1932); Prix de l'Arc de Triomphe (1930 & 1932)

Honours
- Prix Motrico at Saint-Cloud Racecourse
- Last updated on March 29, 2007

Motrico (1925-c.1951) was a French Thoroughbred racehorse who was the second of seven horses to win the Prix de l'Arc de Triomphe on two occasions.

Named for a coastal town in the province of Guipúzcoa in Spain, Motrico was a descendant through his male line of English Triple Crown champion Flying Fox. He was five years old when he won the 1930 Prix de l'Arc de Triomphe and was then retired to stud duty. Less than successful as a sire, he was brought back to the race track in 1932 and in the fall became the oldest "Arc" winner when he claimed victory for a second time under jockey Charles Semblat.

The best known of Motrico's offspring was Hanhof, who won the 1944 Grand Steeple-Chase de Paris. A grandson named Vulgan became an important sire of Steeplechase horses. Motrico's last foal was born in 1950.
