= Arqana =

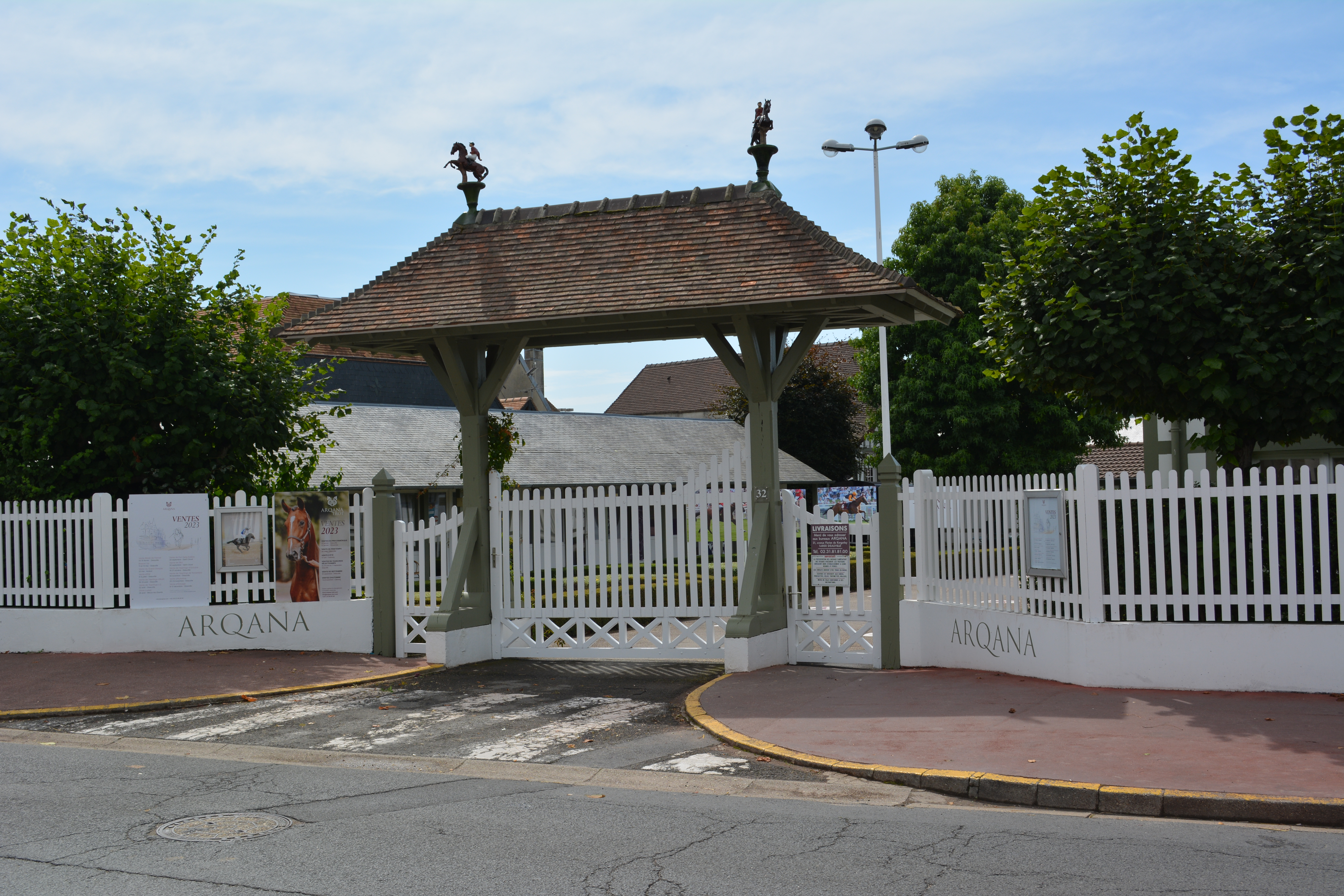
Entrance gate for sale Arqana located at 32 avenue Hocquart de Turtot in Deauville

Arqana is a European auction house that operates horse auctions including the Ventes de Deauville, one of the world's largest auctions for thoroughbred yearlings, which is held in August of each year in Deauville, France.

Created by the merger of auctioneers L'Agence Française de Vente du Pur-sang and Goffs France, Arqana is headed by chairman Georges Rimaud. The company's majority shareholder is the Aga Khan IV, France's biggest thoroughbred owner-breeder. A consortium of French breeders owns approximately 30 percent with the remainder owned by Artcurial, the art auction house subsidiary of the Dassault Group.

According to the Bloodhorse Market Watch, the Deauville auction in August is the best place to find Grade/Group I winners.
