= Coronach (horse) =

British Thoroughbred racehorse

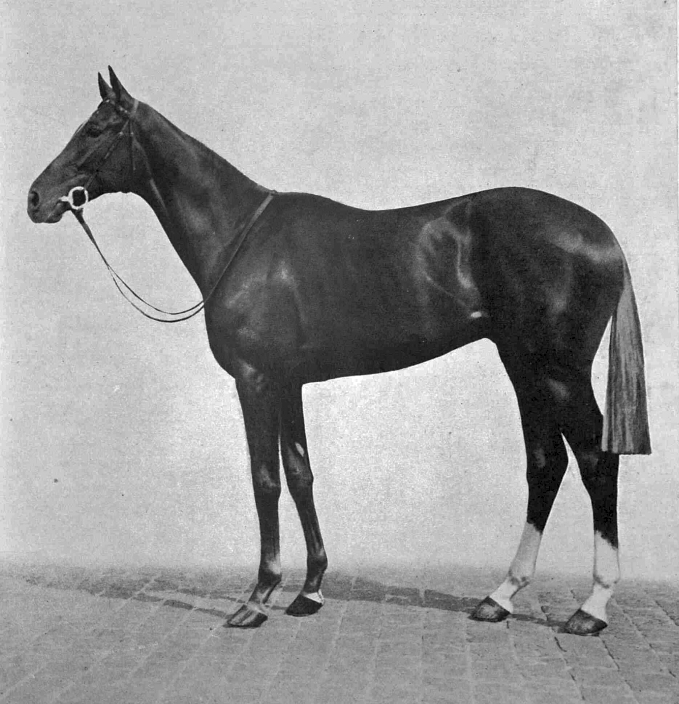
- Coronach in 1926
- Sire: Hurry On
- Grandsire: Marcovil
- Dam: Wet Kiss
- Damsire: Tredennis
- Sex: Stallion
- Foaled: 14 April 1923
- Country: United Kingdom of Great Britain and Ireland
- Colour: Chestnut
- Owner: Lord Woolavington
- Trainer: Fred Darling
- Record: 14: 10-3-1
- Earnings: £

Major wins
- Champagne Stakes (1925); Epsom Derby (1926); St James's Palace Stakes (1926); Eclipse Stakes (1926); St Leger (1926); Coronation Cup (1927); Hardwicke Stakes (1927)

Coronach was a British Thoroughbred racehorse and sire. He was a champion two-year-old who went on to become only the third horse to complete The Derby, Eclipse Stakes and St Leger treble (Tulyar, in 1952, become the most recent and fourth horse to equal the feat) as a three-year-old in 1926, a year in which he also won the St James's Palace Stakes. He won the Coronation Cup at four, but was beaten in his two remaining starts by his long-standing rival Colorado.

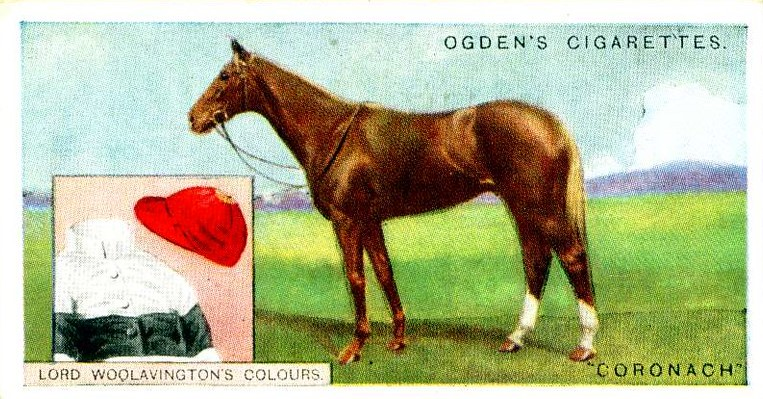
Ogden's cigarette card depicting Coronach and Lord Woolavington's racing colours from 1926

Coronach died in November 1949 in New Zealand.

== Background ==
Coronach, a big, handsome chestnut horse standing 16.2 hands high with a white blaze, white socks on his hind feet and a light-coloured mane and tail, was bred by his owner Lord Woolavington. He was sired by the unbeaten champion, Hurry On, making him a representative of the Godolphin Arabian sire line. Apart from Coronach, Hurry On sired the winners of seven Classics including the Derby winners Captain Cuttle and Call Boy. His most influential son was the Ascot Gold Cup winner Precipitation, who sired four classic winners. Coronach was the fifth foal of the mare Wet Kiss who finished fourth in the 1916 Oaks.

He was trained throughout his career by Fred Darling at Beckhampton. His regular jockey was Joe Childs, whose preferred style of holding up horses for a late run was at odds with Coronach's front running style: after the Derby he was reported to have said that "the bastard ran away with me!"

== Racing career ==
=== 1925: two-year-old season ===
Coronach made his debut in July when he won a maiden race at Salisbury. He then won the Rous Memorial Stakes at Goodwood in "effortless" style, leading the Sporting Life to describe him as "one of the best two-year-olds in England". Coronach completed his hat-trick in the Champagne Stakes at Doncaster, leading from the start and beating Lex by four lengths without being seriously challenged. Coronach was coughing after his Doncaster win but appeared to have made a full recovery by October. On his final start he was beaten a neck by Lex in the Middle Park Stakes at Newmarket. He had legitimate excuses however, as the contest was run at a "muddling pace" and he came back from the race a sick horse, with a high temperature. Despite his defeat he was rated the equal best two-year-old (with Legatee) in the Free Handicap on a mark of 126lbs.

=== 1926: three-year-old season ===
At three, Coronach won the Column Produce Stakes at Newmarket and started "the hottest favourite in years". for the 2000 Guineas. He started slowly and was beaten five lengths by the impressive winner Colorado. Colorado started favourite for the Derby, run in heavy rain which kept away the normally huge crowds. Over one and a half miles Coronach led all the way to reverse the Newmarket form, winning by five lengths "in a canter" from Lancegaye with Colorado third.

He was never in danger of defeat in his remaining starts at three. At Royal Ascot won the St James's Palace Stakes by twenty lengths from Lex. He then won Europe's most valuable flat race, the Eclipse Stakes at Sandown in July, beating Comedy King by six lengths. According to the Glasgow Herald "nothing could ever get near him" and Childs spent the closing stages looking round for non-existent dangers. In the St Leger at Doncaster, Coronach started at odds of 8/15 against eleven rivals. He started slowly, losing four lengths, but soon made up the lost ground and was in a clear lead (estimated at six lengths) by the time the field entered the straight. Childs did not have to put the colt under any pressure as he won by two lengths from Caissot in a record time 3:01.6. The win took Coronach's earnings for the year to over £40,000 and confirmed his status as "the best three-year-old this season."

=== 1927: four-year-old season ===
Although he remained a top class performer at four, Coronach suffered increasingly from respiratory problems which eventually forced his retirement: George Lambton was reported to have said "It is no secret that Coronach is not sound in his wind." He began the year by leading all the way to beat Embargo and Foxlaw in the Coronation Cup at Epsom in June. His winning time of 2:34.0 was exceptionally fast by Epsom standards. He then won the Hardwicke Stakes at Royal Ascot by twelve lengths.

In a much anticipated rematch with Colorado in the Princess of Wales's Stakes at Newmarket Coronach made the running but was overtaken by his rival a furlong from the finish. He was eased in the closing stages and was beaten eight lengths. In his last race he finished third to Colorado in the Eclipse Stakes, beaten seven lengths.

His defeats led to opinions regarding his merit being revised: from being a potential "horse of the century" he was now seen as simply "a good horse."

== Assessment ==
In their book A Century of Champions, John Randall and Tony Morris rated Coronach the forty-second best British horse of the 20th Century and the best Derby winner of the 1920s.

== Stud career ==
Coronach was retired to stand as a stallion at Lavington, West Sussex, until 1940 when he became the first Derby winner to be sent to New Zealand. He was not a great success in England but was more popular in France, where his progeny included the double Prix de l'Arc de Triomphe winner Corrida.

== Sire line tree ==
- Coronach
  - Highlander
  - Montrose
  - De Albertis
  - Cranach
    - Ciel Etoile
    - Violoncelle
  - Niccolo dell'Arca
    - Daumier
    - Nick La Rocca
    - Pluchino
    - Candleabra
    - Nicholas Nickleby

== Pedigree ==
Pedigree of Coronach (GB), chestnut stallion, 1923
Sire Hurry On (IRE) 1913	Marcovil; 1903	Marco	Barcaldine
Sire Hurry On (IRE) 1913	Marcovil; 1903	Marco	Novitiate
Sire Hurry On (IRE) 1913	Marcovil; 1903	Lady Villikins	Hagioscope
Sire Hurry On (IRE) 1913	Marcovil; 1903	Lady Villikins	Dinah
Sire Hurry On (IRE) 1913	Tout Suite; 1904	Sainfoin	Springfield
Sire Hurry On (IRE) 1913	Tout Suite; 1904	Sainfoin	Sanda
Sire Hurry On (IRE) 1913	Tout Suite; 1904	Star	Thurio
Sire Hurry On (IRE) 1913	Tout Suite; 1904	Star	Meteor
Dam Wet Kiss (FR) 1913	Tredennis; 1898	Kendal	Bend Or
Dam Wet Kiss (FR) 1913	Tredennis; 1898	Kendal	Windermere
Dam Wet Kiss (FR) 1913	Tredennis; 1898	St Marguerite	Hermit
Dam Wet Kiss (FR) 1913	Tredennis; 1898	St Marguerite	Devotion
Dam Wet Kiss (FR) 1913	Soligena; 1905	Soliman	St. Simon
Dam Wet Kiss (FR) 1913	Soligena; 1905	Soliman	Alibech
Dam Wet Kiss (FR) 1913	Soligena; 1905	St Gunthern	Carbine
Dam Wet Kiss (FR) 1913	Soligena; 1905	St Gunthern	St Bees (Family: 4f)
