= Omnium II =

French-bred Thoroughbred racehorse

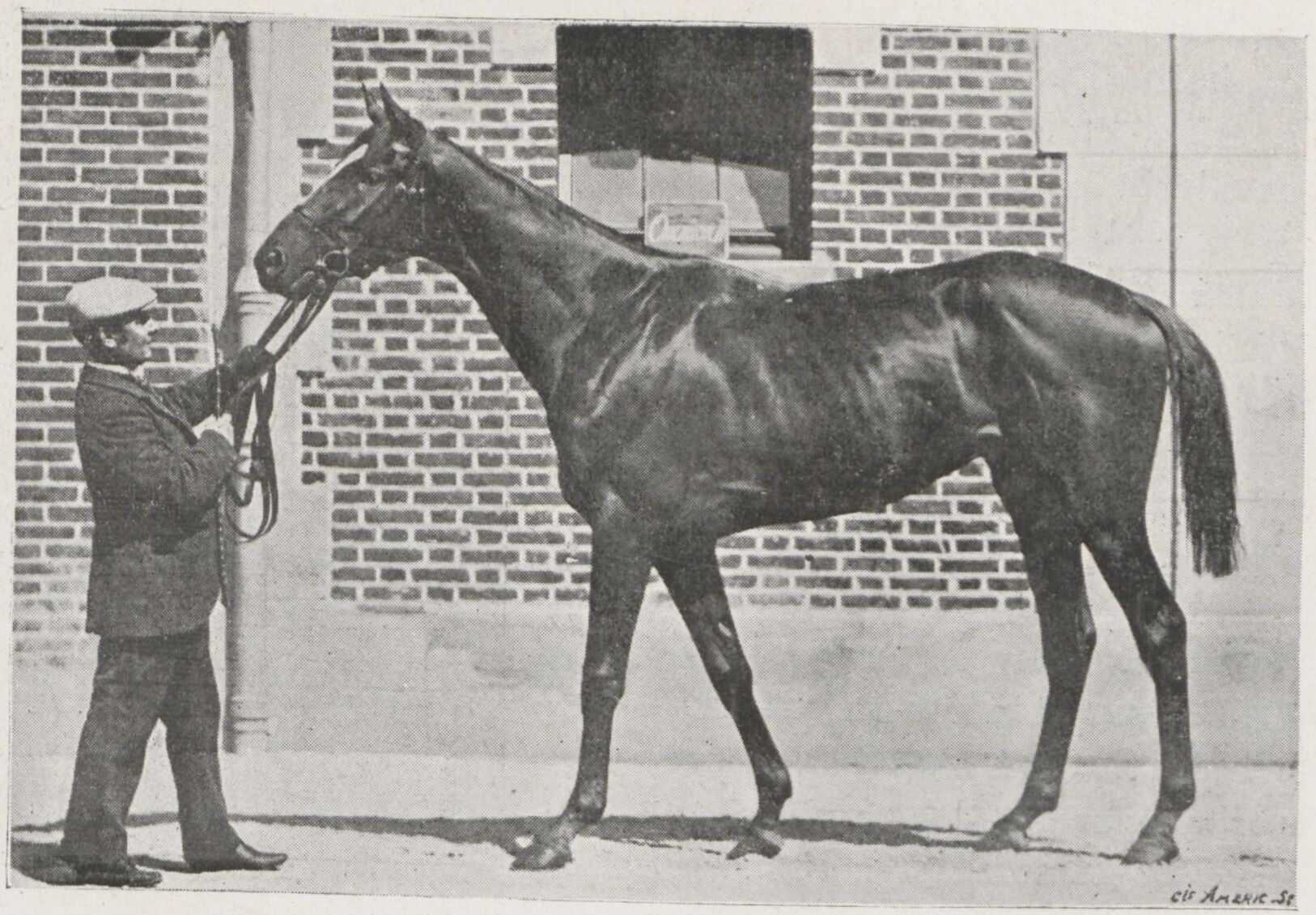
- Omnium II in 1895
- Sire: Upas
- Dam: Bluette
- Damsire: Wellingtonia
- Sex: Stallion
- Foaled: 1892
- Country: France
- Colour: Bay
- Breeder: Leonce Delatre
- Owner: Evremond de Saint-Alary
- Trainer: Edgar Rolfe
- Record: 17 wins
- Earnings: F 669 525

Major wins
- Prix de la Forêt (1894); Prix du Jockey Club (1895); Prix du Cadran (1896); Prix Boiard (1896); Prix du Prince d'Orange (1895 & 1896); Prix du Conseil Municipal (1895 & 1896); Prix Gladiateur (1896)

Awards
- Leading sire in France (1902)

Honours
- Prix Omnium II at Saint-Cloud Racecourse
- Last updated on April 4, 2008

Omnium II (1892–1901) was a Thoroughbred racehorse in France. He was purchased from the Countess Paul Le Marois at the Deauville Yearling sale by Count Evremond de Saint-Alary. He won a number of important French races and was a great long-distance horse, winning the 6,200 meter Prix Gladiateur in 1896 and another endurance test, the Prix Rainbow.

Omnium was retired to Saint-Alary's Haras de Saint Pair du Mont breeding farm at Le Cadran in Calvados, Normandy where he proved to be an important sire. He produced the filly Kizil Kourgan (1899–1919), winner of the Prix de Diane and the Grand Prix de Paris and was the damsire of Bruleur. Born in 1910, Bruleur won the 1913 Grand Prix de Paris and Prix Royal-Oak then at stud became the Leading sire in France for 1921, 1924, and 1929.

Despite dying at age nine, Omnium's successful progeny made him the leading sire in France in 1902.

== Sire line tree ==
- Omnium II
  - Arizona
    - Malteser

== Pedigree ==
Pedigree of Omnium II, chestnut stallion, 1892
Sire Upas 1883	Dollar; 1860	The Flying Dutchman	Bay Middleton
Sire Upas 1883	Dollar; 1860	The Flying Dutchman	Barbelle
Sire Upas 1883	Dollar; 1860	Payment	Slane
Sire Upas 1883	Dollar; 1860	Payment	Receipt
Sire Upas 1883	Rosemary; 1870	Skirmisher	Voltigeur
Sire Upas 1883	Rosemary; 1870	Skirmisher	Gardham mare
Sire Upas 1883	Rosemary; 1870	Vertumna	Stockwell
Sire Upas 1883	Rosemary; 1870	Vertumna	Garland
Dam Bluette 1886	Wellingtonia; 1869	Chatanooga	Orlando
Dam Bluette 1886	Wellingtonia; 1869	Chatanooga	Ayacanora
Dam Bluette 1886	Wellingtonia; 1869	Araucaria	Ambrose
Dam Bluette 1886	Wellingtonia; 1869	Araucaria	Pocahontas
Dam Bluette 1886	Blue Serge; 1876	Hermit	Newminster
Dam Bluette 1886	Blue Serge; 1876	Hermit	Seclusion
Dam Bluette 1886	Blue Serge; 1876	Blue Sleeves	Beadsman
Dam Bluette 1886	Blue Serge; 1876	Blue Sleeves	Mrs Quickly
