= Admiral Drake (horse) =

French thoroughbred racehorse

- Sire: Craig an Eran
- Grandsire: Sunstar
- Dam: Plucky Liege
- Damsire: Spearmint
- Sex: Stallion
- Foaled: 1931
- Country: France
- Colour: Brown
- Breeder: Jefferson Davis Cohn (Haras du Bois-Roussel)
- Owner: Leon Volterra
- Record: 26: 5-1-1
- Earnings: $95,741

Major wins
- Grand Prix de Paris (1934); Prix Biennal (1935)

Admiral Drake (foaled 1931) was a French-bred thoroughbred racehorse who won the Grand Prix de Paris and was a Professional Chef-de-race.

== Background ==
Admiral Drake was the tenth foal from his dam, the noted broodmare Plucky Liege. Her previous offspring included Sir Gallahad and Bull Dog, and she would later produce Bois Roussel.

He stood 164 centimeters tall at the wither.

== Race career ==
During his racing career, Admiral Drake was considered a stayer. He won the Grand Prix de Paris, Grand International d'Ostende, and Prix Biennal, as well as finishing second in the Poule d'Essai des Poulains, Prix du Jockey Club, and Grosser Preis von Berlin.

== Stud career ==
Admiral Drake was a consistently successful sire in France. He led the sire list there in 1955.

Admiral Drake sired 182 foals, of which 77 (42%) started and 22 (12%) were black-type. His AEI was 1.59.

As a broodmare sire, Admiral Drake sired 105 mares who had 481 foals, including 224 starters (47%) and 34 black-type horses (7%). His AEI as a broodmare sire was 2.04.

Admiral Drake was named a Professional Chef-de-race.

Notable progeny

- Phil Drake, winner of the Epsom Derby and Grand Prix de Paris
- Mistral, winner of the Poule d'Essai des Poulains

Notable progeny of daughters

- Turn-to, winner of the Garden State Futurity, Saratoga Special, and Flamingo Stakes; Chef-de-race
- Hard Ridden, winner of the Epsom Derby and Irish 2000 Guineas

== Sire line tree ==
- Admiral Drake
  - Good Admiral
  - Admiral John
  - Granit
  - Laborde
  - Monsieur L'Amiral
  - Amber
  - Goody
    - Traumgeist
    - Obermaat
  - Mistral
    - Nistralin
  - Chesterfield
  - Alindrake
  - Royal Drake
    - Harold
  - Amour Drake
    - Davenport
  - Royal Empire
  - L'Amiral
    - Sailor
  - Piuqu'Avant
    - Piqu'Arriere
      - Un Kopeck
  - Mon Cheri
    - Leigo
      - Kigrandi
        - Demonietto
        - Jack Grandi
    - Leque
  - Pirate
  - Admiral Terek
    - Ben Shak
  - Dandy Drake
  - Phil Drake
    - Esquimau
    - Dicta Drake
      - Dan Kano
    - Aetone
  - Pirate Knight
  - Poisson Volant

== Pedigree ==
Pedigree of Admiral Drake (FR), brown stallion, foaled 1931
Sire Craig an Eran (GB) 1918	Sunstar (GB); 1908	Sundridge (GB)	Amphion (GB)
Sire Craig an Eran (GB) 1918	Sunstar (GB); 1908	Sundridge (GB)	Sierra (GB)
Sire Craig an Eran (GB) 1918	Sunstar (GB); 1908	Doris (GB)	Loved One (GB)
Sire Craig an Eran (GB) 1918	Sunstar (GB); 1908	Doris (GB)	Lauretta^ (GB)
Sire Craig an Eran (GB) 1918	Maid of the Mist (GB); 1906	Cyllene (GB)	Bona Vista (GB)
Sire Craig an Eran (GB) 1918	Maid of the Mist (GB); 1906	Cyllene (GB)	Arcadia (GB)
Sire Craig an Eran (GB) 1918	Maid of the Mist (GB); 1906	Sceptre (GB)	Persimmon^ (GB)
Sire Craig an Eran (GB) 1918	Maid of the Mist (GB); 1906	Sceptre (GB)	Ornament (GB)
Dam Plucky Liege (GB) 1912	Spearmint (GB); 1903	Carbine (NZ)	Musket (GB)
Dam Plucky Liege (GB) 1912	Spearmint (GB); 1903	Carbine (NZ)	Mersey (GB)
Dam Plucky Liege (GB) 1912	Spearmint (GB); 1903	Maid of the Mint (GB)	Minting (GB)
Dam Plucky Liege (GB) 1912	Spearmint (GB); 1903	Maid of the Mint (GB)	Warble (GB)
Dam Plucky Liege (GB) 1912	Concertina (GB); 1896	St Simon*^ (GB)	Galopin (GB)
Dam Plucky Liege (GB) 1912	Concertina (GB); 1896	St Simon*^ (GB)	St. Angela (GB)
Dam Plucky Liege (GB) 1912	Concertina (GB); 1896	Comic Song (GB)	Petrarch*^ (GB)
Dam Plucky Liege (GB) 1912	Concertina (GB); 1896	Comic Song (GB)	Frivolity (GB)

*^ Admiral Drake is inbred 5S x 3D to the stallion St Simon, meaning that he appears fifth generation (via Persimmon)^ on the sire side of his pedigree and third generation on the dam side of his pedigree.

*^ Admiral Drake is inbred 5S x 4D to the stallion Petrarch, meaning that he appears fifth generation (via Lauretta)^ on the sire side of his pedigree and fourth generation on the dam side of his pedigree.
