= Sunstar (racehorse) =

British-bred Thoroughbred racehorse

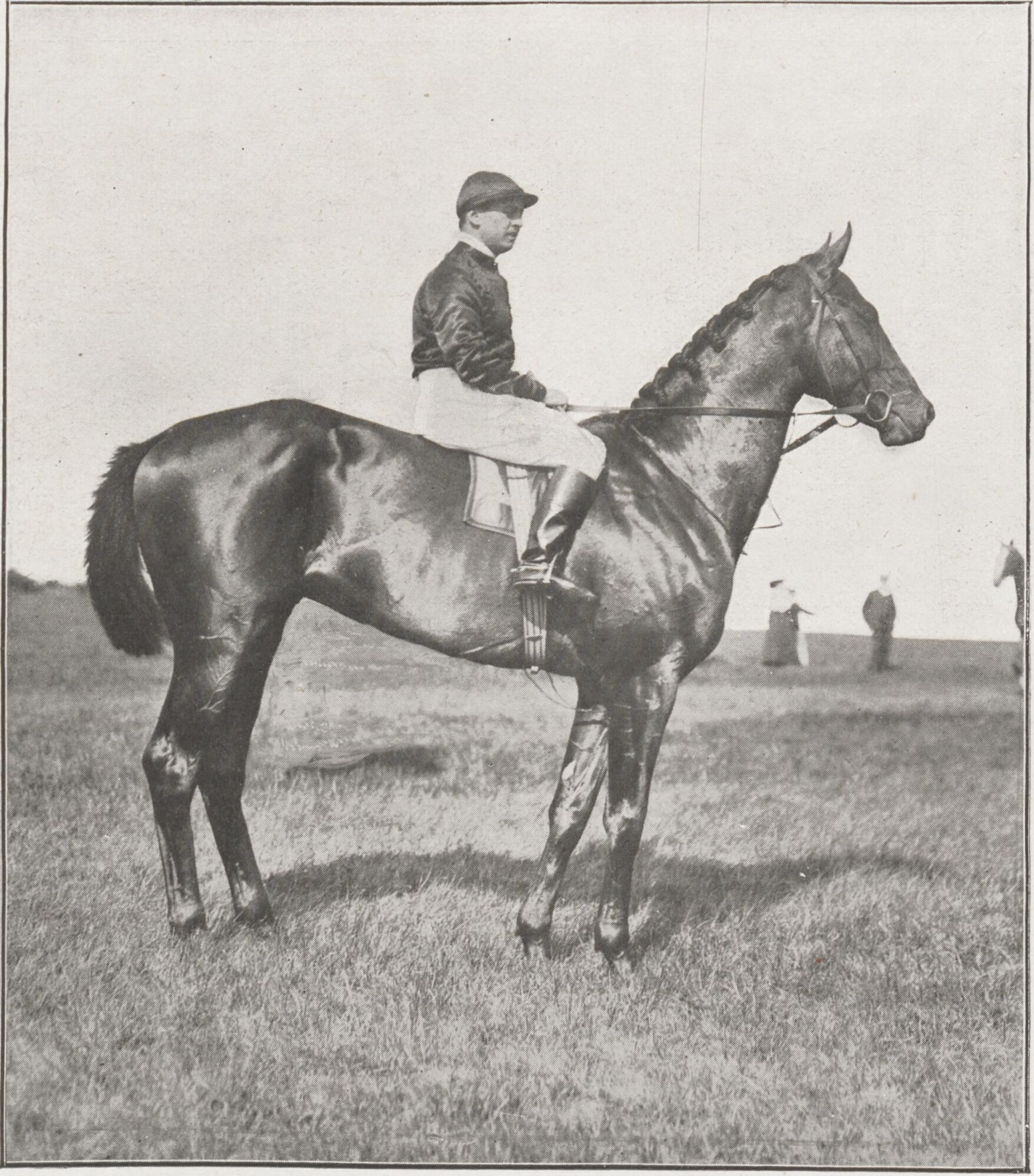
- Sunstar and Georges Stern.
- Sire: Sundridge
- Grandsire: Amphion
- Dam: Doris
- Damsire: Loved One
- Sex: Stallion
- Foaled: 1908
- Country: United Kingdom of Great Britain and Ireland
- Colour: Dark Bay/Brown
- Breeder: Jack Barnato Joel
- Owner: Jack B. Joel
- Trainer: Charles Morton
- Record: 9: 6-1-1
- Earnings: £16,398

Major wins
- International Two-Year-Old Stakes (1910); 2000 Guineas Stakes (1911); Newmarket Stakes (1911); Epsom Derby (1911)

Awards
- Leading broodmare sire in Great Britain and Ireland (1930)

Honours
- Sunstar locomotive

Sunstar (1908–1926) was a British Thoroughbred racehorse and sire. In a career which lasted from June 1910 to May 1911, he ran nine times and won six races. He won the 2000 Guineas Stakes and followed with a win in The Derby.

== Background ==
Sunstar was a medium-sized dark bay or brown horse bred by his owner, the South African mining magnate Jack Joel. He was sired by Sundridge out of a mare named Doris. Sundridge had been a specialist sprinter, excelling over five and six furlongs which led some commentators to doubt his son's ability to stay middle distances. Sundridge had not made an impressive start to his stud career and had been sold to a French breeding syndicate in September 1910, before Sunstar's achievements made his potential evident. He was the Champion sire in 1911, and sired many other good winners, although most of them did better over shorter distances. Doris was a poor racehorse who never rose above selling company, but proved a highly successful broodmare: in the year of Sunstar's Derby win she produced a filly named Princess Dorrie who won the 1000 Guineas and The Oaks in 1914. Joel sent his colt to the stable of his private trainer Charles Morton at Wantage in Oxfordshire.

== Racing career ==
=== 1910: two-year-old season ===
Sunstar showed useful form in winning three of his six races as a two-year-old in 1910. He began his career at Royal Ascot in June when he ran fourth in the New Stakes, a race now known as the Norfolk Stakes. He recorded his first win in the Exeter Stakes at Newmarket and then finished second to St Nat in a race at Goodwood before winning the International Plate at Kempton. In the Champagne Stakes at Doncaster he finished third to Pietri. He returned to Newmarket for the Hopeful Stakes and produced his best performance of the season when dead-heating with Borrow, a colt who went on to win the Middle Park Stakes in October.

=== 1911: three-year-old season ===
In the winter and early spring of 1911, Sunstar began to make rapid progress and Morton decided to test the colt in a private trial race at Wantage. On the morning of Good Friday, 14 April, Sunstar was pitted against two good older horses, The Story and Spanish Prince, and won impressively. The form of the trial looked even better when both of the beaten horses won important handicap races in the subsequent weeks. News of the supposedly private trial soon became public, and when Sunstar appeared at Newmarket for the 2000 Guineas twelve days later, he started the 5/1 second favourite in a field of fourteen runners. Ridden by the French jockey Georges Stern, he won by two lengths from Lord Derby's colt Stedfast in a race record time of 1:37.6. Two weeks after his win in the Guineas, Sunstar was moved up to ten furlongs to run in the Newmarket Stakes, despite the concerns of his trainer, who felt that the unusually hard ground presented a risk of injury to the colt's legs. He won the race from Beaurepaire and Persephone, showing that despite his pedigree, he had the stamina for middle distances and confirming his position as favourite for the Derby.

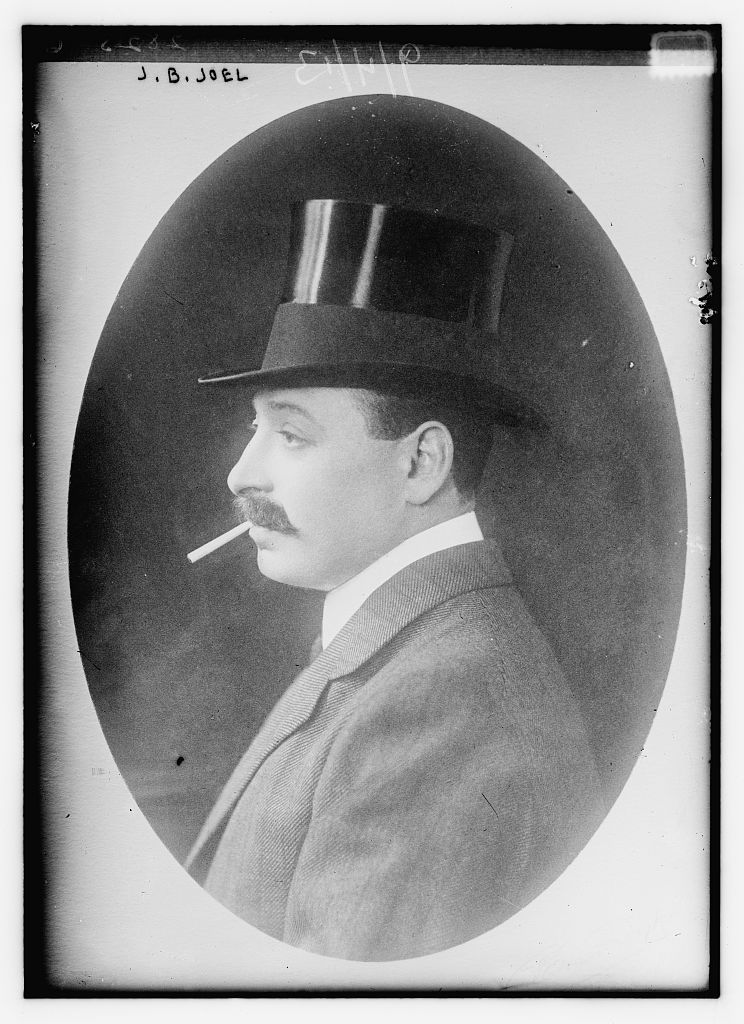
Jack Joel: he insisted on running Sunstar in the Derby.

Nine days before the Derby Sunstar pulled up lame in his right foreleg after a training gallop. He had sustained an injury to the suspensory ligaments or the "back tendons" so painful that he was unable to put any weight on the injured leg, making his participation at Epsom extremely doubtful. Morton worked on the injury for the next week, with one treatment involving wrapping the affected leg in cabbage leaves. He was able to deal with the superficial lameness, but informed Joel that the underlying condition remained and that although Sunstar would be able to run in the Derby, any further aggravation of the injury would almost certainly end the horses career. Joel took the decision to run Sunstar, whatever the long-term consequences. In the build-up to the race there were rumours that Sunstar was the target of a plot to prevent his running, orchestrated either by Joel's personal enemies or by unscrupulous bookmakers who stood to lose heavily if the colt were successful. Joel responded by ensuring the Wantage stables were subject to strict security measures. It was later alleged that the source of the rumours was Joel himself, and that the whole affair was either a poorly judged practical joke or an attempt to obtain better odds.

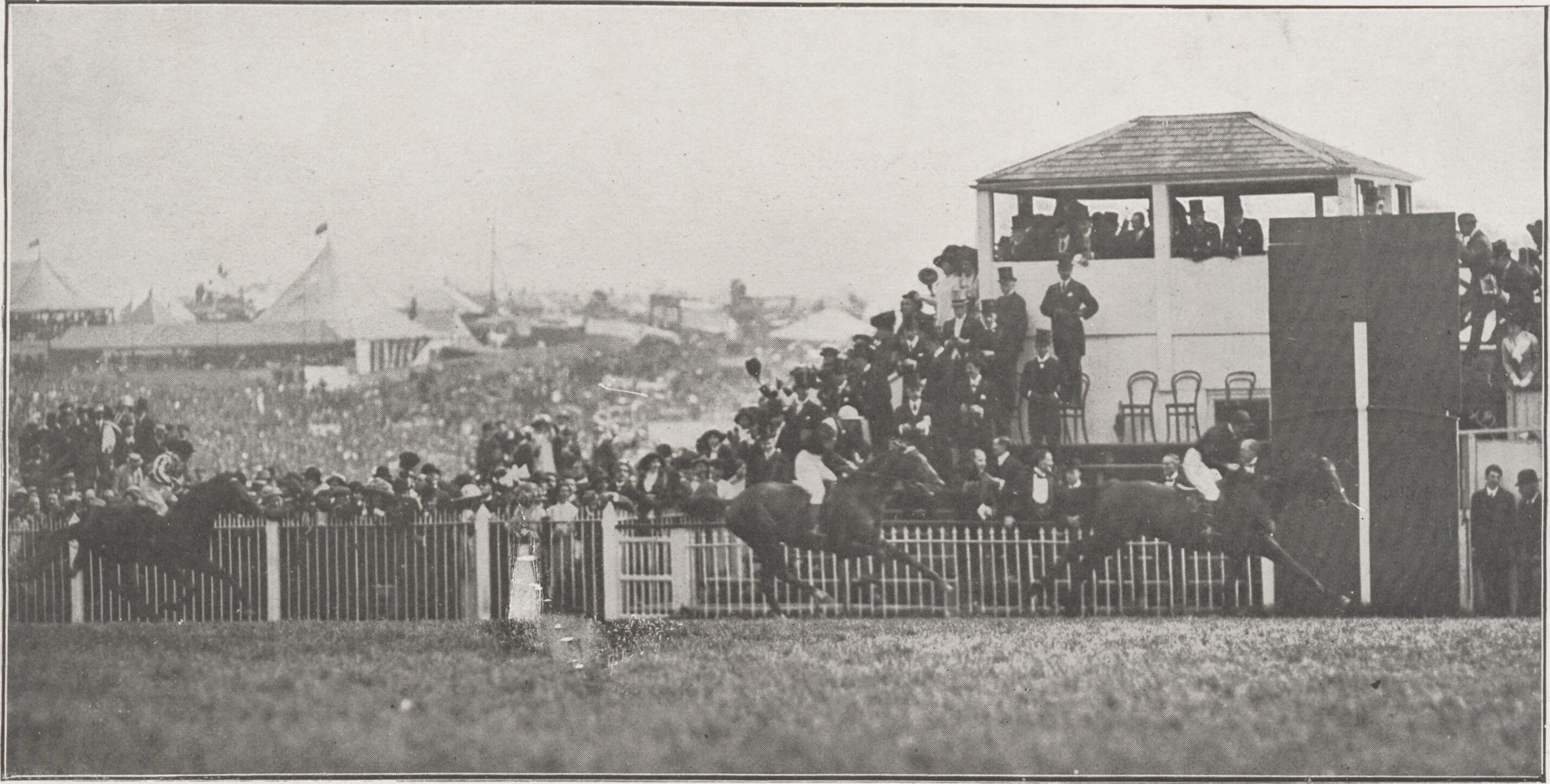
Finish of 1911 Epsom Derby.

At Epsom on 31 May, Sunstar, despite widespread rumours about his fitness, started the 13/8 favourite in a field of twenty-six runners. The race took place on a fine day and attracted the customary enormous crowd including the King and Queen. The field was considered weaker than usual, with several of the year's best colts missing the race, including the City and Suburban Handicap winner Mushroom, who had never been entered. The start was unsatisfactory, as Stedfast refused to line up with the other runners and was left several lengths behind when the race began. George Stern settled Sunstar in fourth or fifth place behind Bannockburn, Phryxus and Eton Boy, until the turn into the straight when he sent the favourite through a gap on the inside to take the lead. Sunstar went clear of the field, but Stedfast, who had made up a great deal of ground, emerged as his challenger and got to within a length of the leader a furlong from the finish. At this point Stern felt Sunstar falter as his suspect foreleg gave way, but despite his injury, the colt pulled ahead again and won by two lengths from Stedfast, with Royal Tudor four lengths back in third. His winning time of 3:36.8 equaled the second fastest time in the race's history. Sunstar's lameness returned as soon as he pulled up after the race and he was barely able to walk to the winner's circle. It was a first Derby win for Stern, after finishing second on Jardy in 1905 and Louviers in 1909. In addition to the winner's prize of £6,450, Joel reportedly took over £30,000 in winning bets. Initial reports stated that Sunstar was to be immediately taken out of training and retired. In reality, the colt showed some signs of recovery and was being prepared for the St Leger at Doncaster in September when he broke down again in training in August and was then retired to stud.

== Assessment ==
In their book A Century of Champions, Tony Morris and John Randall rated Sunstar a "superior" winner of the 2000 Guineas and an average winner of the Derby. The premature ending of his career meant that he was never tested against Prince Palatine, who was probably the best horse of his generation.

== Stud record ==
Sunstar was retired to stud duty at Jack Joel's Childwick Bury Stud near St. Albans, Hertfordshire, at an initial fee of 300 guineas. He proved to be both a very influential sire and broodmare sire. He was also exceptionally fertile and covered such large books of mares that Joel was criticised by rival breeders. Among his progeny were:

- Craig an Eran (born 1918), won 2000 Guineas Stakes
- Sunny Jane (born 1914), won Epsom Oaks
- Zodiac (born 1921), won Irish Derby Stakes
- Buchan (born 1916), leading sire in Great Britain and Ireland (1927)
- Galloper Light (born 1916), won Grand Prix de Paris; sire of Epsom Oaks winners, Beam and Light Brocade
- Sunbonnet (born 1914), won Kentucky Oaks, Alabama Stakes, American Champion Three-Year-Old Filly
- Alan Breck (born 1918), leading sire in Argentina
- North Star (born 1914), won Middle Park Stakes, sire of Kentucky Derby winner Bubbling Over
- Roselyon (born 1916), sire of King's Plate winners Aymond and Willie the Kid

Sunstar was the leading broodmare sire in Great Britain and Ireland in 1930. He was notably the damsire of:

- Sunstep (born 1916), became a foundation mare for Claiborne Farm
- Ellangowan (born 1920), won 2000 Guineas Stakes
- Kopi (born 1926), won Irish Derby Stakes

Sunstar died on 21 August 1926, and was buried alongside his sire Sundridge in the equine cemetery at Childwick Bury Stud where his monument still stands

== Sire line tree ==
- Sunstar
  - Star Hawk
    - Red Hawk
    - Frisius
  - North Star III
    - Busy American
    - Oil Man
      - Shorelint
    - Boot To Boot
    - Bubbling Over
      - Burgoo King
        - Be Fearless
    - Buddy Bauer
      - Budpath
    - Belli Casus
      - Winton
  - Sanitar
    - Polus
  - Blink
    - Blanc
      - Baltic Baron
        - Bogatyr
        - Gabardin
        - Zabieg
      - Bank
    - Brientz
    - Twink
      - Shining One
  - Helion
    - Argonaute
    - Ingre
  - Sir Berkeley
    - Sunny View
    - Spianto
  - Sky-Rocket
  - Somme Kiss
    - Reedsmouth
  - Buchan
    - Bucellas
    - Vitality
    - Bicarbonate
    - Buckler
    - Buckfast
    - Shian Mor
      - Taiho
        - Toshihaya
      - Kabutoyama
        - Matsu Midori
      - Flame Mor
      - Governor
      - Kuri Hikari
    - Dancing Floor
    - Cockpen
    - Janus
      - Aureolus
    - Mr Standfast
      - Gold Stand
      - Lord Chancellor
      - Atatu
      - Prince Standard
    - Soon Over
    - John James
      - Sydney James
      - Bold John
    - Night Owl
  - Cygnus
    - Poor Lad
    - Colonel Cygnus
  - Galloper Light
    - Kentish Knock
    - Light Carbine
    - Baralong
      - Aeolus
    - Tattoo
    - Whirlwind
    - Reflector
    - Nicolo Pisano
    - Present
  - Kentish Cob
  - Roselyon
    - Aymond
    - Willie the Kid
  - Australian Sun
    - In The Shade
  - Daylight Patrol
  - Southern
    - Oduagis
      - Sudan
  - Alan Breck
    - Carlsminde
    - Fernkloof
      - Palphar
    - Mountain Lad
    - Tresiete
      - Rolando
      - Sorteado
      - Cuareto
        - Balsamo
      - Tonico
    - Mar Caspio
    - Mandante
      - Tripoteur
    - Banderin
    - Respingo
  - Craig an Eran
    - Lavina
    - Mon Talisman
      - Almaska
      - Morvillars
      - Magnetique
        - Heres
      - Clairvoyant
        - Seer
      - Talma
      - Lindor
    - Cragadour
    - Hazrat
    - April the Fifth
      - Rejoice
        - Revelry
      - Red April
    - Admiral Drake
      - Good Admiral
      - Admiral John
      - Granit
      - Laborde
      - Monsieur L'Amiral
      - Amber
      - Goody
        - Traumgeist
        - Obermaat
      - Mistral
        - Nistralin
      - Chesterfield
      - Alindrake
      - Royal Drake
        - Harold
      - Amour Drake
        - Davenport
      - Royal Empire
      - L'Amiral
        - Sailor
      - Piuqu'Avant
        - Piqu'Arriere
      - Mon Cheri
        - Leigo
        - Leque
      - Pirate
      - Admiral Terek
        - Ben Shak
      - Dandy Drake
      - Phil Drake
        - Esquimau
        - Dicta Drake
        - Aetone
      - Pirate Knight
      - Poisson Volant
  - Stardrift
    - Madstar
  - Sunblaze
  - Thunderer
    - Roar
      - Punt Gun
        - Brzesc
  - Great Star
    - Great Legend
      - Toastmaster
  - Satelles
    - Crucis
  - Scopas
    - Scapino
    - Manganello
  - Villars
    - Dzems
    - Frajer
    - Krater
    - Wisus
    - Leb W Leb
      - San
        - De Corte
          - Humbug
          - San Thiego
          - Hubert
      - Lepek
      - Sombrero
      - Laryks
    - Jon
    - Maciek
  - Light Hand
    - Leander
      - Bastard
    - Leu
    - Boho
      - Ganymed
      - Tartuffe
    - Situtunga
  - Rosewing
  - Saltash
    - Strephon
  - Arausio
  - Sunstone
  - Zodiac
    - Cullingham
  - Sagacity
    - Fantasio
    - Tabula Rasa
  - Sherwood Starr
    - Rock Star
    - Robber Chief
  - Star Of Pride
    - Wellbourne Jake
  - Sunderland
  - Zambo
    - Le Becau
    - Jumbo
  - Aramis
    - Timely
  - Banstar
    - L'Ouragan
  - Plimsol
  - British Empire
  - Burnewang

== Pedigree ==
Pedigree of Sunstar (GB), dark bay or brown stallion, 1908
Sire Sundridge (GB) 1898	Amphion; 1886	Rosebery	Speculum
Sire Sundridge (GB) 1898	Amphion; 1886	Rosebery	Ladylike
Sire Sundridge (GB) 1898	Amphion; 1886	Suicide	Hermit
Sire Sundridge (GB) 1898	Amphion; 1886	Suicide	The Ratcatcher's Daughter
Sire Sundridge (GB) 1898	Sierra; 1889	Springfield	St Albans
Sire Sundridge (GB) 1898	Sierra; 1889	Springfield	Viridis
Sire Sundridge (GB) 1898	Sierra; 1889	Sanda	Wenlock^
Sire Sundridge (GB) 1898	Sierra; 1889	Sanda	Sandal
Dam Doris (GB) 1898	Loved One; 1883	See Saw	Buccaneer
Dam Doris (GB) 1898	Loved One; 1883	See Saw	Margery Daw
Dam Doris (GB) 1898	Loved One; 1883	Pilgrimage	The Palmer
Dam Doris (GB) 1898	Loved One; 1883	Pilgrimage	Lady Audley
Dam Doris (GB) 1898	Lauretta; 1883	Petrarch	Lord Clifden*^
Dam Doris (GB) 1898	Lauretta; 1883	Petrarch	Laura
Dam Doris (GB) 1898	Lauretta; 1883	Ambuscade	Camerino
Dam Doris (GB) 1898	Lauretta; 1883	Ambuscade	Crossfire (Family: 5-i)

*^ Sunstar is inbred 5S x 4D to the stallion Lord Clifden, meaning that he appears fifth generation (via Wenlock)^ on the sire side of his pedigree and fourth generation on the dam side of his pedigree.
