= Fred Lane (jockey) =

Jockey

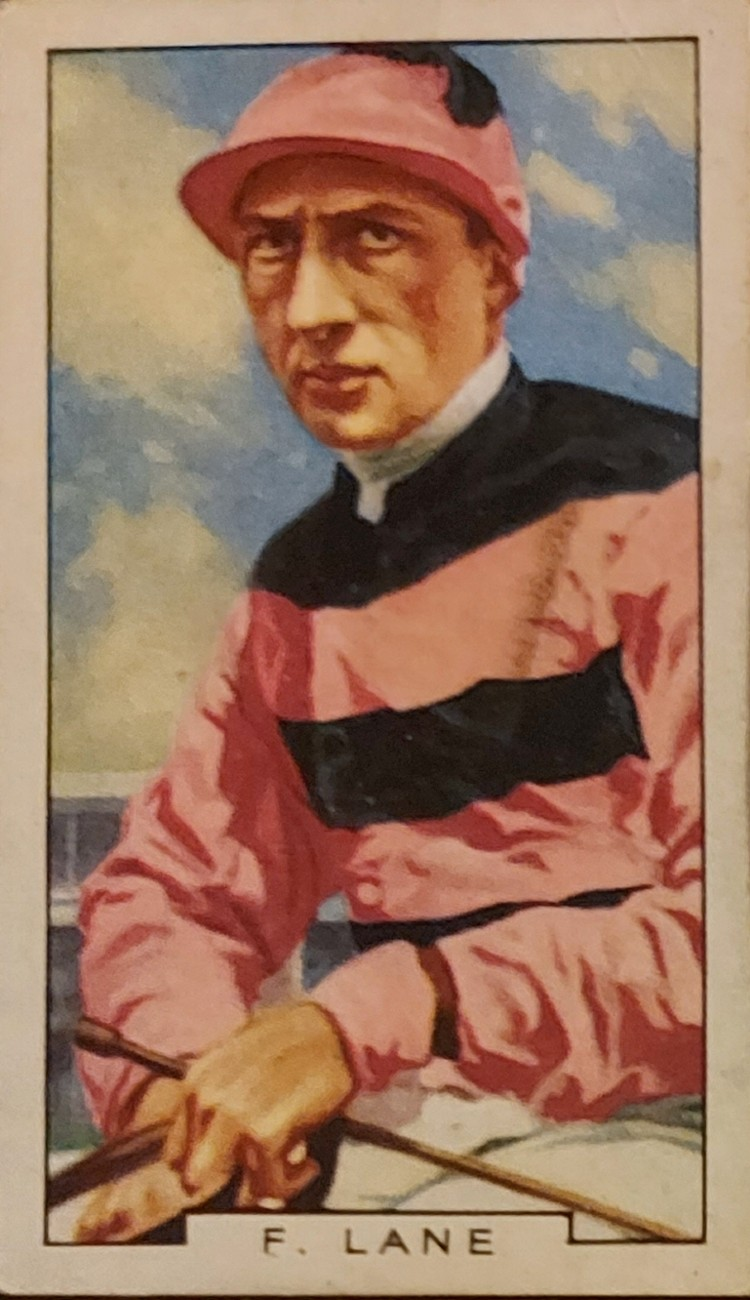
- Fred Lane, in the colours of Tom Walls (Gallaher's cigarette card, 1936)

Personal information
- Born: 1892 France
- Died: 12 July 1979 (aged 86–87) Newmarket, Suffolk
- Occupation: Jockey

Horse racing career
- Sport: Horse racing

Major racing wins
- Major race wins: Derby Stakes (1932); Goodwood Cup (1929); Sussex Stakes (1922)

Significant horses
- April the Fifth, Diligence, Old Orkney, Polemarch
- Updated on 22 January 2022

Fred Lane (1892 – 12 July 1979) was a French-born, English-based flat racing jockey, who won the 1932 Derby among other big races.

== Career ==
Unable to get many rides in England at the start of his career, he took advice from fellow jockey Joe Childs to pursue a career in Europe. This meant that at the outbreak of World War I, he was interred in Germany, along with other English riders. On his return he won the Ebor on Race Rock for Tom Cannon Jr. in 1919, and two consecutive Gimcrack Stakes, on Polemarch in 1920 and Scamp in 1921.

Other victories came in the Jockey Club Stakes (Lady Juror in 1922), the Queen Alexandra Stakes (Seclin, 1925), the Ascot Stakes and Goodwood Cup on Old Orkney in 1929, as well as the Queen's Vase, Cheveley Park Stakes, and Sussex Stakes. He won on Mountain Lad in the 1930 Chester Cup and Silvermere in the 1932 Ascot Gold Vase

Lane was jockey for George Digby at Exning, but he won the Derby for Tom Walls on April the Fifth, quite late into his career. Steve Donoghue had refused to commit to the horse at the start of the season and Lane was retained to ride him instead.

Crawley Wood was another good horse for him, winning the Great Metropolitan Stakes at Epsom and Final Stakes at Newmarket in 1935.

His "consistently successful" racing career lasted from before World War I until after World War II, after which he continued as a work rider into late middle age.

== Reputation ==
Lane has been variously called "quiet and reliable" and a "jockey of all-round ability" and was said to be at his best over longer distances.

== Personal life ==
Lane married Florence Griggs, widow of trainer Walter Griggs, at St Peter's, Eaton Square, London, in 1933, which led to him becoming uncle by marriage to Lester Piggott and Fred and Bill Rickaby.

== Major wins ==
(United Kingdom) Great Britain

- Epsom Derby – April the Fifth (1932)
- Goodwood Cup – Old Orkney (1929)
- Sussex Stakes – Diligence (1922)

== See also ==
- List of jockeys

== Bibliography ==
- Mortimer, Roger; Onslow, Richard; Willett, Peter (1978). Biographical Encyclopaedia of British Racing. London: Macdonald and Jane's. ISBN 0-354-08536-0. s
