= Craig an Eran =

British-bred Thoroughbred racehorse

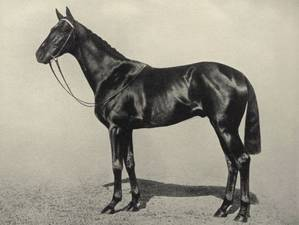
- Sire: Sunstar
- Grandsire: Sundridge
- Dam: Maid of the Mist
- Damsire: Cyllene
- Sex: Stallion
- Foaled: 1918
- Country: United Kingdom
- Colour: Bay
- Breeder: Waldorf Astor, 2nd Viscount Astor
- Owner: 2nd Viscount Astor
- Trainer: Alec Taylor Jr.
- Record: 7: 3-1-1
- Earnings: £15,345

Major wins
- 2000 Guineas (1921); St James's Palace Stakes (1921); Eclipse Stakes (1921)

Craig an Eran (1918 – 1945) was a British Thoroughbred racehorse and sire. He failed to win as a two-year-old but improved to become one of the best in England in 1921. He won the 2000 Guineas, St James's Palace Stakes and Eclipse Stakes as well as finishing second in the Epsom Derby and fourth in the St Leger. After his retirement from racing he became a successful breeding stallion whose offspring included April the Fifth and Mon Talisman.

== Background ==
Craig an Eran was a bay horse bred in the United Kingdom by his owner Waldorf Astor, 2nd Viscount Astor. He was sent into training with Alec Taylor, Jr. at his stable at Manton, Wiltshire.

He was from the sixth crop of foals sired by Sunstar who won the 2000 Guineas and the Epsom Derby in 1911 before his career was ended by injury. Craig an Eran's dam Maid of the Mist was a daughter of Sceptre and an influential broodmare in her own right, who also produced the Epsom Oaks winner Sunny Jane. Her other descendants have included Buchan, Commanche Run, Full Dress, Swiftfoot and One in a Million.

== Racing career ==
=== 1920: two-year-old season ===
Craig an Eran ran twice as a juvenile, beginning his track career by finishing second in the Salisbury Racecourse Foal Plate in spring. At Royal Ascot in June he finished unplaced behind Alan Breck in the New Stakes.

=== 1921: three-year-old season ===
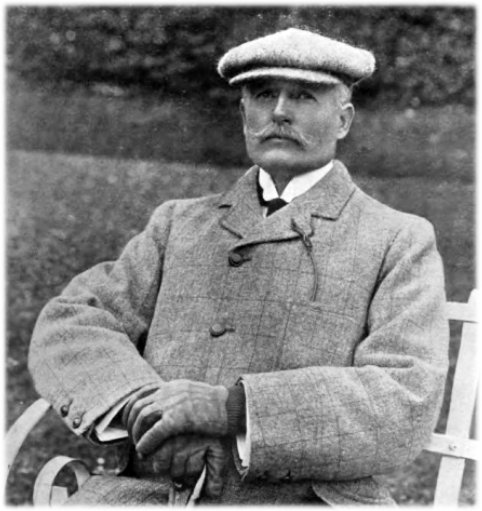
Alec Taylor, Jr, who trained Craig an Eran

On 29 April Craig an Eran (ridden by Jack Brennan) started at odds of 100/6 (approximately 16/1) in the 113th running of the 2000 Guineas over the Rowley Mile at Newmarket Racecourse. Humorist started favourite while the best fancied of the other 24 runners included Monarch (Middle Park Stakes), Alan Beck, Polemarch and Lemonora. Inside the final furlong Humorist held the lead but the complexion of the race changed in the final strides as Craig an Eran and Lemonora overtook the leaders. Craig an Eran crossed the line three quarters of a length ahead of Lemonora with Humorist the same distance away in third. After the race the colt assumed the position of favourite in the ante-post betting for the Derby.

On 1 June Craig an Eran started 5/1 second favourite behind Leighton in a 23-runner field for the Epsom Derby. He produced a sustained run in the straight but was beaten a neck by Humorist after a "battle royal" with three lengths back to Lemonora in third. Frank Bullock, who had ridden the colt in 1920, took over from Brennan when Craig an Eran was dropped in distance for the St James's Palace Stakes over one mile at Royal Ascot and won at odds of 1/8. The form of the British Classic Races was franked in late June when Lemonora won the Grand Prix de Paris, the most valuable race in the world at that time. One day later however, it was announced that Humorist had died in his stable. On 15 July Craig an Eran was matched against older horses in the Eclipse Stakes over ten furlongs at Sandown Stakes and, with Bullock in the saddle, won at odds of 2/7 favourite. He was followed home by Braishfield (Sussex Stakes) and Pompadour (third in the 1000 Guineas), giving Alec Taylor a 1-2-3 in the race.

On 7 September Craig an Eran started 1/4 favourite for the St Leger over 14 1/2 furlongs at Doncaster Racecourse and was reportedly regarded as a "certainty". He moved up to dispute the lead in the straight but failed to stay and finished fourth behind Polemarch, Franklin and Westward Ho!. Excuses were offered for the colt's defeat: it was reported that Taylor had been unable to train the horse to peak fitness on the prevailing hard ground and that Craig an Eran had been bumped by Westward Ho! in the straight. The latter claim was refuted by the jockeys involved in an enquiry by the racecourse stewards.

== Assessment and honours ==
In their book, A Century of Champions, based on the Timeform rating system, John Randall and Tony Morris rated Craig an Eran an "average" winner of the 2000 Guineas.

== Stud record ==
Craig an Eran remained in training as a four-year-old but in April 1922 it was decided to retire the colt from racing and put him to stud at fee of 250 guineas. He was employed a breeding stallion in England, before moving to France. The best of his offspring included April the Fifth, Mon Talisman and the Grand Prix de Paris winner Admiral Drake. Craig an Eran was euthanised on 22 October 1945.

== Sire line tree ==
- Craig an Eran
  - Lavina
  - Mon Talisman
    - Almaska
    - Morvillars
    - Magnetique
      - Heres
        - Herodes
    - Clairvoyant
      - Seer
    - Talma
    - Lindor
  - Cragadour
  - Hazrat
  - April the Fifth
    - Rejoice
      - Revelry
    - Red April
  - Admiral Drake
    - Good Admiral
    - Admiral John
    - Granit
    - Laborde
    - Monsieur L'Amiral
    - Amber
    - Goody
      - Traumgeist
      - Obermaat
    - Mistral
      - Nistralin
    - Chesterfield
    - Alindrake
    - Royal Drake
      - Harold
    - Amour Drake
      - Davenport
    - Royal Empire
    - L'Amiral
      - Sailor
    - Piuqu'Avant
      - Piqu'Arriere
        - Un Kopeck
    - Mon Cheri
      - Leigo
        - Kigrandi
      - Leque
    - Pirate
    - Admiral Terek
      - Ben Shak
    - Dandy Drake
    - Phil Drake
      - Esquimau
      - Dicta Drake
        - Dan Kano
      - Aetone
    - Pirate Knight
    - Poisson Volant

== Pedigree ==
Pedigree of Craig an Eran (GB), bay stallion, 1918
Sire Sunstar (GB) 1908	Sundridge; 1898	Amphion	Rosebery
Sire Sunstar (GB) 1908	Sundridge; 1898	Amphion	Suicide
Sire Sunstar (GB) 1908	Sundridge; 1898	Sierra	Springfield
Sire Sunstar (GB) 1908	Sundridge; 1898	Sierra	Sanda
Sire Sunstar (GB) 1908	Doris; 1898	Loved One	See Saw
Sire Sunstar (GB) 1908	Doris; 1898	Loved One	Pilgrimage
Sire Sunstar (GB) 1908	Doris; 1898	Lauretta	Petrarch
Sire Sunstar (GB) 1908	Doris; 1898	Lauretta	Ambuscade
Dam Maid of the Mist (GB) 1906	Cyllene; 1895	Bona Vista	Bend Or*
Dam Maid of the Mist (GB) 1906	Cyllene; 1895	Bona Vista	Vista
Dam Maid of the Mist (GB) 1906	Cyllene; 1895	Arcadia	Isonomy
Dam Maid of the Mist (GB) 1906	Cyllene; 1895	Arcadia	Distant Shore
Dam Maid of the Mist (GB) 1906	Sceptre; 1899	Persimmon	St Simon
Dam Maid of the Mist (GB) 1906	Sceptre; 1899	Persimmon	Perdita
Dam Maid of the Mist (GB) 1906	Sceptre; 1899	Ornament	Bend Or*
Dam Maid of the Mist (GB) 1906	Sceptre; 1899	Ornament	Lily Agnes (Family: 16-h)

* Craig an Eran is inbred 4D x 4D to the stallion Bend Or, meaning that he appears fourth generation twice on the dam side of his pedigree.
