= Prix Juigné =

Flat horse race in France

- Class: Conditions
- Location: Longchamp Racecourse; Paris, France
- Inaugurated: 1894
- Race type: Flat / Thoroughbred
- Website: france-galop.com

Race information
- Distance: 2,100 metres (1m 2½f)
- Surface: Turf
- Track: Right-handed
- Qualification: Three-year-old colts and geldings previously unraced
- Weight: 58 kg
- Purse: €25,000 (2018); 1st: €12,500

The Prix Juigné is a flat horse race in France open to three-year-old thoroughbred colts and geldings. It is run over a distance of 2,100 metres (about 1 mile and 2½ furlongs) at Longchamp in April. It is restricted to horses which have not raced previously.

== History ==
The event was established in 1894, and it was originally called the Prix de la Reine Marguerite. It was initially contested by colts and fillies over 2,000 metres, and had prize money of 20,000 francs. The inaugural running was won by Sesame.

The race continued with its original title until 1900, and was renamed the Prix Juigné in 1901. It was named in memory of Gustave de Juigné, a member of the Société d'Encouragement.

The distance of the race was extended to 2,100 metres in 1925. Its prize money increased throughout the 1920s, reaching 100,000 francs in 1929. It was held at Auteuil in 1943, and Maisons-Laffitte in 1944. Its prize was 300,000 francs on both occasions.

During the post-war period, the Prix Juigné was contested by several notable horses. The runner-up in 1955, Phil Drake, subsequently won that year's Epsom Derby.

The event was closed to fillies and shortened to 2,000 metres in 1990. It was restored to 2,100 metres in 2017.

== Records ==
Leading jockey since 1980 (6 wins):

- Freddy Head – Sea Boy (1980), Fin Gourmet (1981), Comtal (1982), Donato (1985), Deja (1991), Red Victory (1994)

Leading trainer since 1980 (10 wins):

- André Fabre – Galant Vert (1983), Klimt (1986), Raneen (1989), Topelius (1990), Turners Hill (1993), Bobinski (1995), Water Poet (1996), Kocab (2005), Last Train (2012), Sand Fox (2017)

Leading owner since 1980 (7 wins):

- Khalid Abdullah – Turners Hill (1993), Red Victory (1994), Kocab (2005), Zambezi Sun (2007), Last Train (2012), Teletext (2014), Bugle Major (2018)

== Winners since 1980 ==
| Year | Winner | Jockey | Trainer | Owner | Time |
|---|---|---|---|---|---|
| 1980 | Sea Boy | Freddy Head | Alec Head | Jacques Wertheimer | 2:15.50 |
| 1981 | Fin Gourmet | Freddy Head | Alec Head | Jacques Wertheimer | 2:20.40 |
| 1982 | Comtal | Freddy Head | David Smaga | Georges Blizniansky |
| 1983 | Galant Vert | Henri Samani | André Fabre | Guy de Rothschild |
| 1984 | Greek Sky | Cash Asmussen | François Boutin | Stavros Niarchos |
| 1985 | Donato | Freddy Head | Criquette Head | Jacques Wertheimer |
| 1986 | Klimt | Alfred Gibert | André Fabre | Guy de Rothschild |
| 1987 | Northern Boy | Guy Guignard | Criquette Head | Jacques Wertheimer | 2:16.70 |
| 1988 | Bazas | Dominique Lawniczak | Noël Pelat | Constantin Boikos |
| 1989 | Raneen | Cash Asmussen | André Fabre | Sheikh Mohammed |
| 1990 | Topelius | Alain Lequeux | André Fabre | Paul de Moussac |
| 1991 | Deja | Freddy Head | Criquette Head | Martine Head | 2:09.30 |
| 1992 | Sogno | Dominique Boeuf | Élie Lellouche | Edgard Zorbibe |
| 1993 | Turners Hill | Thierry Jarnet | André Fabre | Khalid Abdullah | 2:16.60 |
| 1994 | Red Victory | Freddy Head | Criquette Head | Khalid Abdullah | 2:17.70 |
| 1995 | Bobinski | Thierry Jarnet | André Fabre | Bob McCreery | 2:21.00 |
| 1996 | Water Poet | Thierry Jarnet | André Fabre | Sheikh Mohammed | 2:10.10 |
| 1997 | Kepster ^{[a]} | Thierry Thulliez | Élie Lellouche | Wafic Saïd | 2:08.40 |
| 1998 | Brooklyn's Gold | Olivier Doleuze | Criquette Head | Wertheimer et Frère | 2:21.90 |
| 1999 | Falcon Flight | Sylvain Guillot | Pascal Bary | Ecurie J. L. Bouchard | 2:09.00 |
| 2000 | Liniriso | Olivier Doleuze | Criquette Head | Peter Savill | 2:11.60 |
| 2001 | Cybergenic | Olivier Doleuze | Criquette Head-Maarek | Alec Head | 2:24.70 |
| 2002 | Highest Guest | Thierry Thulliez | Pascal Bary | Laghi / Saibene | 2:08.20 |
| 2003 | Policy Maker | Dominique Boeuf | Élie Lellouche | Ecurie Wildenstein | 2:13.00 |
| 2004 | Cool Britannia | Thierry Gillet | Jonathan Pease | Leigh Family | 2:11.90 |
| 2005 | Kocab | Christophe Soumillon | André Fabre | Khalid Abdullah | 2:11.00 |
| 2006 | Minkowski | Thierry Gillet | John Hammond | Michael Tabor | 2:06.40 |
| 2007 | Zambezi Sun | Thierry Thulliez | Pascal Bary | Khalid Abdullah | 2:13.10 |
| 2008 | Magadan | Anthony Crastus | Élie Lellouche | Ecurie Wildenstein | 2:16.20 |
| 2009 | Acteur Celebre | Anthony Crastus | Élie Lellouche | Ecurie Wildenstein | 2:07.74 |
| 2010 | Silver Pond | Olivier Peslier | Carlos Laffon-Parias | Haras du Quesnay | 2:21.90 |
| 2011 | Mr Chance | Grégory Benoist | David Smaga | Gérard Laboureau | 2:15.40 |
| 2012 | Last Train | Maxime Guyon | André Fabre | Khalid Abdullah | 2:07.97 |
| 2013 | Spiritjim | Christophe Soumillon | Pascal Bary | Jean-Michel Hegesippe | 2:20.05 |
| 2014 | Teletext | Christophe Lemaire | Pascal Bary | Khalid Abdullah | 2:10.75 |
| 2015 | Vision des Aigles | Grégory Benoist | Francis-Henri Graffard | Al Shaqab Racing | 2:06.47 |
| 2016 | no race |
| 2017 | Sand Fox ^{[b]} | Mickael Barzalona | André Fabre | Godolphin | 2:17.51 |
| 2018 | Bugle Major | Vincent Cheminaud | Pascal Bary | Khalid Abdullah | 2:16.47 |
| 2019 | Montabot | Cristian Demuro | Pascal Bary | Gerard Augustin-Normand | 2:17.99 |
| 2021 | In Crowd | Vincent Cheminaud | Freddy Head | George W. Strawbridge Jr. | 2:18.40 |
| 2022 | Alerio | Christophe Soumillon | Francis-Henri Graffard | Stephane Gouvaze | 2:21.89 |
| 2023 | Feed The Flame | Christophe Soumillon | Pascal Bary | Ecurie Jean-Louis Bouchar | 2:14.43 |
| 2024 | Delius | Cristian Demuro | Jean-Claude Rouget | Magnier, Smith, Tabor & Westerberg | 2:25.34 |
| 2025 | Daryz | Mickael Barzalona | Francis-Henri Graffard | Aga Khan Studs SCEA | 2:13.41 |
| 2026 | Varandir | Mickael Barzalona | Francis-Henri Graffard | Aga Khan Studs SCEA | 2:16.57 |

^{a} Tremel finished first in 1997, but he was relegated to second place following a stewards' inquiry.
^{b} The 2017 race took place at Saint-Cloud while Longchamp was closed for redevelopment.

== Earlier winners ==
- 1894: Sesame
- 1895: Chrome
- 1896: Indus
- 1897: Rouge Daim
- 1898: Taillebourg
- 1899: Sylphe
- 1900: Ganymede
- 1901: Pontife
- 1902: Linaro
- 1903: Theocles
- 1904: Amiante
- 1905: Phoenix
- 1906: Fellah
- 1907: Francois
- 1908: Gigolo
- 1909: Darwin
- 1910: Cadet Roussel
- 1911: Traversin
- 1912: Ultimatum
- 1913: El Tango
- 1914: Mon Petiot
- 1919: Cesaire
- 1920: Calabar
- 1921: Rambour
- 1922: Keror
- 1923: Anna Bolena
- 1924: Vineuil
- 1925: Myrio
- 1926: Dark Japan
- 1927: Mon Talisman
- 1928: Ivanoe
- 1929: Cheval de Troie
- 1930: Fayoum
- 1931: Valreas
- 1932: Shred
- 1933: Jumbo
- 1934: Revendi
- 1935: Furlico
- 1936: Petit Jean
- 1937: Chesham
- 1938: Bois Roussel
- 1939: Hunter's Moon
- 1940: King of Trumps
- 1941: Morosini
- 1942: Erromango
- 1943: Vatelys
- 1944: Bucephale
- 1946: Laurentis
- 1947: Parisien
- 1948: Goyaz
- 1949: Highlander
- 1950: Fast Fox
- 1951: Stymphale
- 1952: Magyar
- 1953: Northern Light
- 1954: Popof
- 1955: Datour
- 1956: Tanerko
- 1957: Le Tricolore
- 1958: Noelor
- 1959: Vamour
- 1960: Nymphellor
- 1961: Match
- 1962: Ray
- 1963: Beau Persan
- 1965: Sunday
- 1966: Premier Violon
- 1967: Misyaaf
- 1968: Tapalque
- 1969: Chimo
- 1970: Kautokeino
- 1971: Charonville
- 1972: Mr Long
- 1973: Palikare
- 1975: Sanctum
- 1976: Aberdeen Park
- 1977: Vagaries
- 1979: Simiso

== See also ==
- List of French flat horse races
- Recurring sporting events established in 1894 – this race is included under its original title, Prix de la Reine Marguerite.
