= Prix Daru =

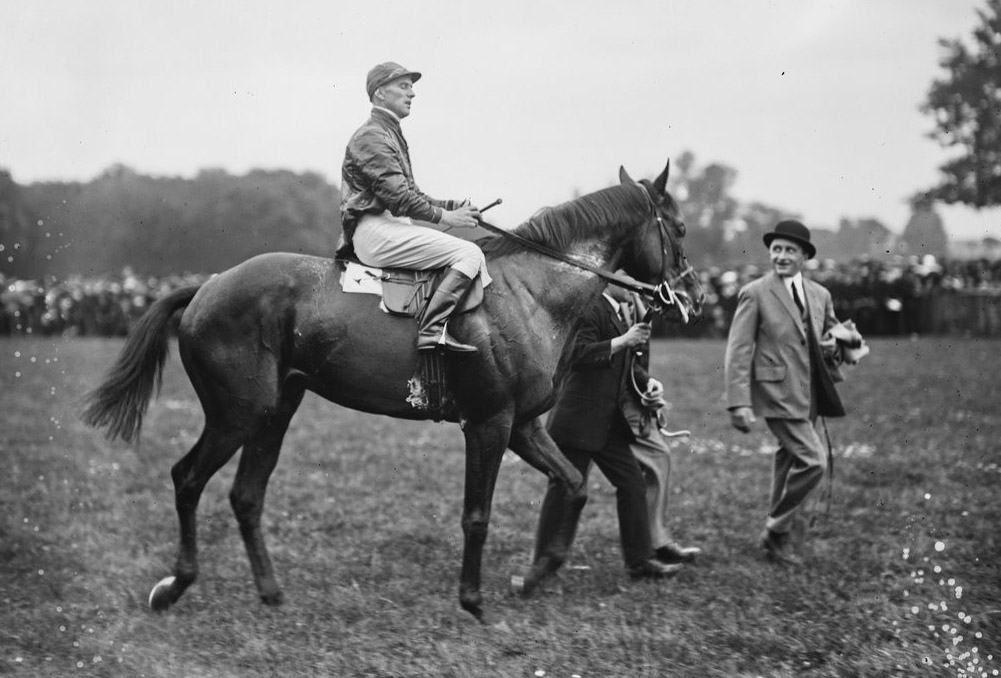
- Le Capucin winner in 1923
- Class: Group 2
- Location: Longchamp Racecourse; Paris, France
- Inaugurated: 1841
- Final run: 17 April 1977
- Race type: Flat / Thoroughbred
- Website: france-galop.com

Race information
- Distance: 2,100 metres (1m 2½f)
- Surface: Turf
- Track: Right-handed
- Qualification: Three-year-olds

The Prix Daru was a Group 2 flat horse race in France open to three-year-old thoroughbreds. It was run at Longchamp over a distance of 2,100 metres (about 1 mile and 2½ furlongs), and it was scheduled to take place each year in mid-April.

== History ==
The event was established in 1841, and it was originally called the Poule des Produits. It was initially staged at the Champ de Mars, and was later transferred to Longchamp. For a period it was held in May.

The race continued as the Poule des Produits until 1876. It was renamed in memory of Viscount Paul Daru, who served as president of the Société d'Encouragement, in 1877.

The Prix Daru was one of several trials for the Prix du Jockey Club collectively known as the Poules des Produits. The others (listed by their modern titles) were the Prix Lupin, the Prix Hocquart, the Prix Noailles and the Prix Greffulhe. From 1885, the Prix Daru was restricted to horses whose dams were born outside France. The event was funded by entries submitted before a horse's birth, in the year of its conception.

The race merged with the Prix Noailles during the 1940s. The combined event, the Prix Daru-Noailles, was contested over 2,150 metres at Le Tremblay in 1943. It took place at Maisons-Laffitte in 1944 and 1945, and Longchamp in 1946.

The present system of race grading was introduced in 1971, and the Prix Daru was classed at Group 2 level. It was discontinued after 1977. Its last winner was Carwhite, ridden by Freddy Head, trained by Alec Head and owned by Jacques Wertheimer.

== Winners ==
- 1841: Cauchemar
- 1842: Angora
- 1843: Governor
- 1844: Commodor Napier
- 1846: Fleet
- 1847: Glands
- 1848: Lioubliou
- 1850: Babiega
- 1851: Illustration
- 1852: Aguila
- 1853: Fontaine
- 1854: Lysisca
- 1855: Monarque
- 1856: Nat
- 1857: Florin
- 1858: Gouvieux
- 1859: Geologie
- 1860: Violette
- 1862: Benjamin
- 1863: Pergola
- 1864: Bois Roussel
- 1865: Tourmalet
- 1866: Marengo
- 1867: Cerf Volant
- 1868: Ouragan
- 1869: Peripetie
- 1871: no race
- 1872: Nethon
- 1873: Boiard
- 1874: Destinee
- 1875: Almanza
- 1876: Braconnier
- 1877: La Jonchere
- 1878: Stathouder
- 1879: Salteador
- 1880: Voilette
- 1881: Albion IV
- 1882: Mademoiselle de Senlis
- 1883: Rubens
- 1884: Archiduc
- 1885: Extra
- 1886: Jupin
- 1887: Le Sancy
- 1888: Stuart
- 1889: Thomery
- 1890: Flibustier
- 1891: Ermak
- 1892: Diarbek
- 1893: Fousi Yama
- 1894: Idle Boy
- 1895: Arioviste
- 1896: Champaubert
- 1897: Quilda
- 1898: Le Samaritain
- 1899: Perth
- 1900: Solon
- 1901: Saxon
- 1902: Arizona
- 1903: Caius
- 1904: Sam Sam
- 1905: Jardy
- 1906: Crillon
- 1907: Sans Souci
- 1908: Gigolo
- 1909: Oversight
- 1910: Or du Rhin
- 1911: Shetland
- 1912: Floraison
- 1913: Ecouen
- 1914: La Farina
- 1920: Boscobel
- 1921: Le Majordome
- 1922: Zariba
- 1923: Le Capucin
- 1924: Pot au Feu
- 1925: Lucide
- 1926: Soubadar
- 1927: Mon Talisman
- 1928: Mondovi
- 1929: Donatello
- 1930: Potiphar
- 1931: Barneveldt
- 1932: Shred
- 1933: Vareuse
- 1934: Le Gosse
- 1935: Ipe
- 1936: Bel Aethel
- 1937: Victrix
- 1938: Astrologer
- 1939: Mon Tresor
- 1940: Loliondo
- 1941: Le Corail
- 1942: Tornado
- 1943–46: see Prix Noailles
- 1947: Tharsis
- 1948: Boby
- 1949: Norval
- 1950: Damasco
- 1951: Aquino
- 1952: Luzon
- 1953: Buisson d'Or
- 1954: Popof
- 1955: Kurun
- 1956: Ambiax
- 1957: Amber
- 1958: Yoggi
- 1959: Gric
- 1960: Pharamond
- 1961: Moutiers
- 1962: Exbury
- 1963: Beau Persan
- 1964: Papaya
- 1965: Jacambre
- 1966: Pasha
- 1967: Carmarthen
- 1968: Scherzo
- 1969: Budapest
- 1970: Gyr
- 1971: Irish Ball
- 1972: Lyphard
- 1973: Rose Laurel
- 1974: Dankaro
- 1975: Easy Regent
- 1976: Youth
- 1977: Carwhite

== See also ==
- List of French flat horse races
- Recurring sporting events established in 1841 – this race is included under its original title, Poule des Produits.
