= April the Fifth =

British-bred Thoroughbred racehorse

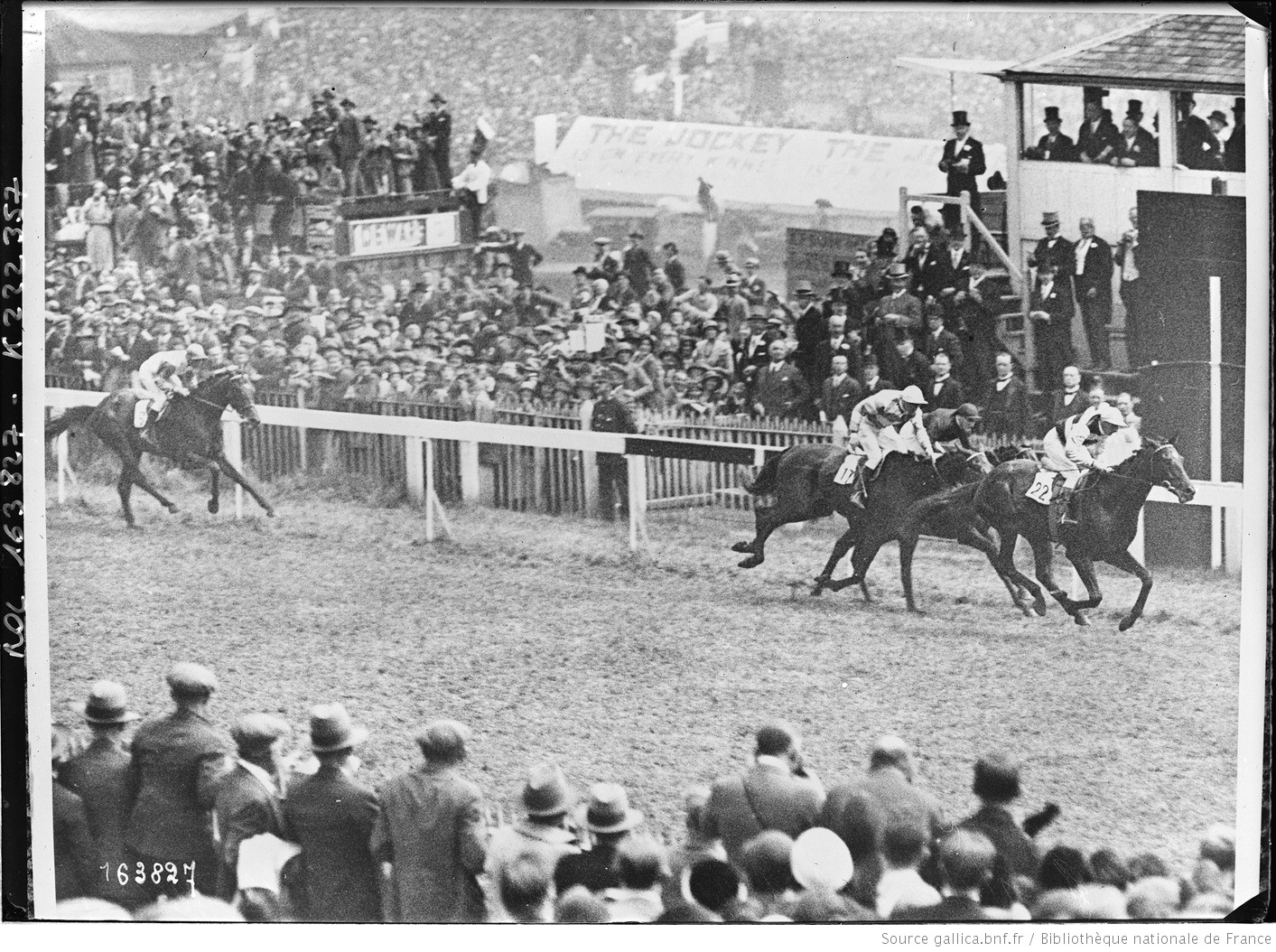
- April the Fifth (22) wins the Derby.
- Sire: Craig an Eran
- Grandsire: Sunstar
- Dam: Sold Again
- Damsire: Call o'the Wild
- Sex: Stallion
- Foaled: 1929
- Died: 1954 (aged 24–25)
- Country: United Kingdom
- Colour: Brown
- Breeder: Sydney McGregor and Mr G.S.L. Whitelaw
- Owner: Tom Walls and Sydney McGregor
- Trainer: Tom Walls
- Record: 9:3-0-0
- Earnings: £10,423¼

Major wins
- Lingfield Derby Trial (1932); Epsom Derby (1932)
- Last updated on 2 July 2009

April the Fifth (1929–1954) was a British Thoroughbred racehorse and sire. In a career that lasted from September 1931 until September 1932 he ran nine times and won three races. He failed to win or be placed in his first five races, but then showed sudden improvement in the spring of 1932, winning his next three races including The Derby. His subsequent career was adversely affected by injury and after one more unsuccessful race he was retired to stud, where he had little impact as a sire of winners.

== Background ==
April the Fifth was a big, good-looking brown horse sired by Craig an Eran, the winner of the 1921 2000 Guineas and Eclipse Stakes, as well as the runner-up in that year's Epsom Derby, finishing second to Humorist by a neck. His grandsire Sunstar won the 2000 Guineas and Epsom Derby in 1911 before becoming a successful stud; apart from Craig an Eran, notable offspring included the 1917 Epsom Oaks Sunny Jane. His dam, Sold Again had an unfashionable pedigree, proved useless in a career as a racehorse on the flat and was given away free to her trainer who sold her for 20 guineas. She was bought for 230 guineas by Sydney McGregor who raced her over hurdles without success before retiring her to stud. April the Fifth was bred by McGregor in partnership with Mr G.S.L. Whitelaw at the Lillington Stud near Leamington Spa. He was foaled on 5 April, which was also the birthday of his breeder, McGregor.

When the partnership of McGregor and Whitelaw was dissolved, April the Fifth was put up for auction as a yearling and bought for 200 guineas by McGregor, who was therefore both part-vendor and buyer in the transaction. He raced in the name of Tom Walls who trained him at his stables at Epsom Downs Racecourse. Although Walls had a keen interest in the sport he was much better known as a comic actor who was famous for his stage and film performances in the farces of Ben Travers. The ownership arrangement was that Walls was named as the official owner in return for meeting all the training expenses, with any prize money being equally divided between Walls and McGregor.

== Racing career ==
=== 1931: two-year-old season ===
April the Fifth raced three times in 1931 without success and failing to show any worthwhile form. On his racecourse debut he finished sixth in a minor race at Gatwick and then failed to reach the first ten in similarly unimportant events at Wolverhampton and Derby. Walls later admitted that his illness in 1931 prevented him from preparing the horse as he would have wished.

=== 1932: three-year-old season ===
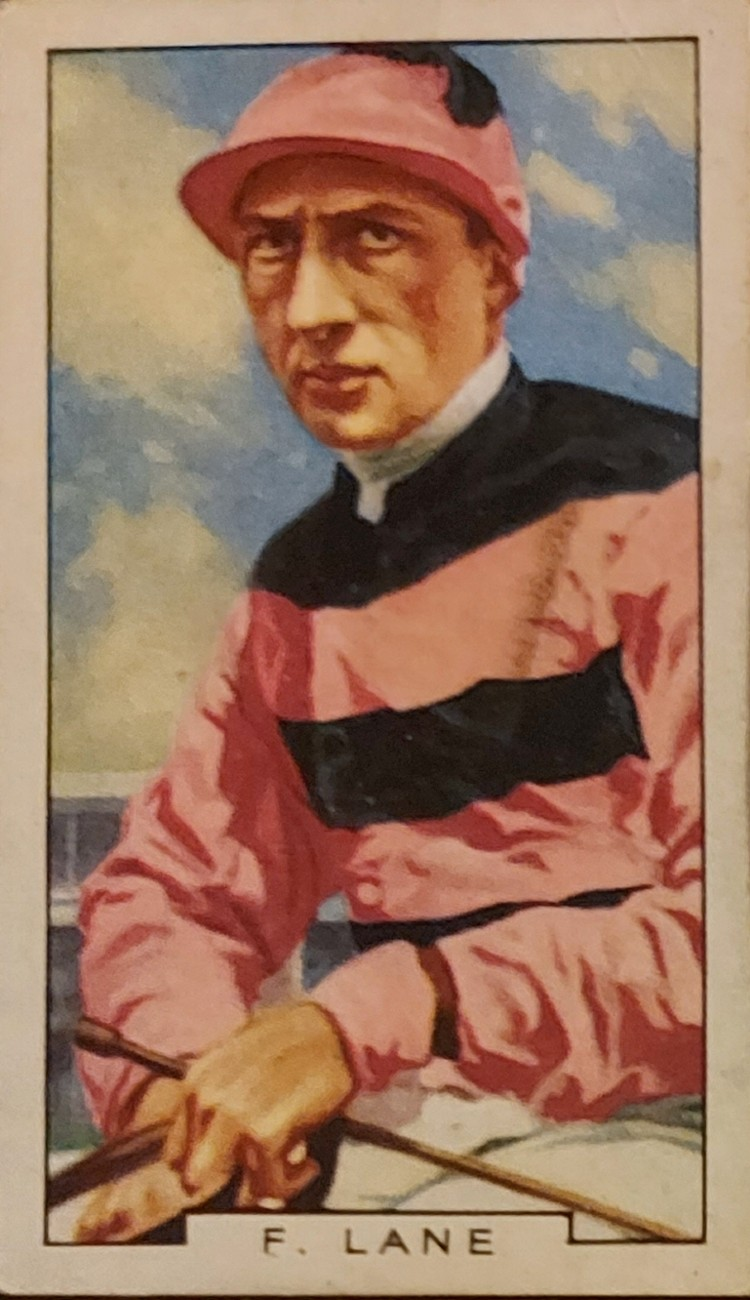
Fred Lane, April the Fifth's jockey, in owner Tom Walls' racing colours (from a 1936 cigarette card)

April the Fifth showed some sign of improvement on his three-year-old debut as he finished a close fourth in a small handicap race at Birmingham Racecourse in March. Despite his modest achievements he was then sent to Newmarket for the 2000 Guineas on 27 April and finished sixth of the eleven runners behind Orwell, who had been the best British two-year-old of the previous season. The performance by the 50/1 outsider surprised many who had expected him to be completely outclassed. At his sixth attempt, April the Fifth was successful as he won a one-mile maiden race at Gatwick on 14 May. A week later he was moved up in distance to contest the inaugural running of the Lingfield Derby Trial over one and a half miles. In a strong field which included the Aga Khan's well-regarded colt Firdaussi, April the Fifth displayed form well in advance of anything he had previously shown to win comfortably by two lengths. The win saw him enter contention for the Derby, although some questioned whether Walls had the necessary experience and expertise to prepare a horse for the most important race of the year.

In the build-up to the Derby, Walls made no secret of his belief in his colt: in a column for a Sunday newspaper three days before the race he informed his readers that "April the Fifth is not a joke...(he is) the best place bet in the race." On 1 June, with a million spectators at Epsom Downs, April the Fifth started at odds of 100 to 6 (16.7/1) in a field of twenty-one runners with Orwell being made the 5/4 favourite, despite doubts concerning his stamina, ahead of the Newmarket Stakes winner Miracle. Ridden by Fred Lane, April the Fifth was restrained in the early stages before being produced with his challenge in the straight. Finishing strongly, he overtook the Aga Khan's colt Dastur inside the final furlong to win by three quarters of a length with Miracle a short head back in third. Firdaussi, the Aga Khan's other entry, finished fifth, while Orwell was ninth. The winning time was two minutes and 43 seconds. April the Fifth was a very popular winner and the first Epsom-trained horse to win the Derby since Amato in 1838. After the race, Walls joked that he would consider changing the horse's name from "April the Fifth" to "June the First".

The form of the Derby was boosted later in the month when five of the beaten horses won races at the Royal Ascot meeting. Following his Derby win, April the Fifth was given a break from training before beginning his preparation for the St Leger at Doncaster. While staying at a stable in Sussex he sustained a knee injury which interrupted his schedule and prevented him from running in a trial race at Hurst Park. Attempts to restore his fitness with "considerable amounts of sea-bathing" were only partially successful. At Doncaster on 7 September he reached third place half a mile from the finish but faded in the straight and finished unplaced behind Firdaussi, a horse he had beaten comfortably in his two previous races. In this race Dastur completed the rare achievement of finishing second in all three legs of the British Triple Crown. Walls announced that April the Fifth would be kept in training with the Coronation Cup and the Ascot Gold Cup as his principal targets, but he never raced again and was retired to stud.

== Retirement ==
April the Fifth spent twenty years at stud, but he was a poor sire of flat racers. He was however a useful sire of National Hunt horses and Sydney McGregor bred the 1958 Ascot Gold Cup winner Gladness from a mare by April the Fifth. His most successful offspring was the steeplechaser Red April, who earned £12,900 for his owner Lord Stalbridge.

He died in 1954.

== Sire line tree ==
- April the Fifth
  - Rejoice
    - Revelry
  - Red April

== Pedigree ==
Pedigree of April the Fifth (GB), brown stallion, 1929
Sire Craig an Eran (GB) 1918	Sunstar; 1908	Sundridge	Amphion
Sire Craig an Eran (GB) 1918	Sunstar; 1908	Sundridge	Sierra
Sire Craig an Eran (GB) 1918	Sunstar; 1908	Doris	Loved One
Sire Craig an Eran (GB) 1918	Sunstar; 1908	Doris	Lauretta
Sire Craig an Eran (GB) 1918	Maid of the Mist; 1906	Cyllene*	Bona Vista
Sire Craig an Eran (GB) 1918	Maid of the Mist; 1906	Cyllene*	Arcadia
Sire Craig an Eran (GB) 1918	Maid of the Mist; 1906	Sceptre	Persimmon
Sire Craig an Eran (GB) 1918	Maid of the Mist; 1906	Sceptre	Ornament
Dam Sold Again (IRE) 1920	Call o' the Wild; 1913	Polymelus	Cyllene*
Dam Sold Again (IRE) 1920	Call o' the Wild; 1913	Polymelus	Maid Marian
Dam Sold Again (IRE) 1920	Call o' the Wild; 1913	Coo-ee	Trenton
Dam Sold Again (IRE) 1920	Call o' the Wild; 1913	Coo-ee	Lady Sterling
Dam Sold Again (IRE) 1920	Market; 1912	Marcovil	Marco
Dam Sold Again (IRE) 1920	Market; 1912	Marcovil	Lady Villikins
Dam Sold Again (IRE) 1920	Market; 1912	Fairmile	Common
Dam Sold Again (IRE) 1920	Market; 1912	Fairmile	Lady Clarendon (Family: 18-a)

* April the Fifth is inbred 3S x 4D to the stallion Cyllene, meaning that he appears third generation on the sire side of his pedigree and fourth generation on the dam side of his pedigree.
