= Zambezi Sun =

British-bred Thoroughbred racehorse

- Sire: Dansili
- Grandsire: Danehill
- Dam: Imbabala
- Damsire: Zafonic
- Sex: Stallion
- Foaled: 2004
- Country: Great Britain
- Colour: Bay
- Breeder: Juddmonte Farms
- Owner: Khalid Abdullah
- Trainer: Pascal Bary
- Record: 10: 4-1-1
- Earnings: €592,180

Major wins
- Prix Juigné (2007); Prix de Nanterre (2007); Grand Prix de Paris (2007); Prix Foy (2008)

Zambezi Sun (foaled 2004 in the United Kingdom) is a Thoroughbred racehorse who competes in France. He is owned and bred by Khalid Abdullah's Juddmonte Farms, who owned his multiple stakes-winning sire Dansili who was also the Leading sire in France in 2006 and a son of the international leading sire, Danehill. Zambezi Sun was out of the Juddmonte Farms mare Imbabala, a daughter of Zafonic who was the 1992 European Champion Two-Yr-Old Colt and a 1993 British Classic winner.

Trained by Pascal Bary, Zambezi Sun made his debut at the beginning of April 2007 at Longchamp Racecourse in Paris, winning the Prix Juigné, an event for unraced three-year-old colts and geldings. In his next start on April 29, he won the Prix de Nanterre at the Longchamp course and then on June 3 at Chantilly Racecourse he ran fourth to winner Lawman in the Group 1 Prix du Jockey Club. Back at Longchamp Racecourse, Zambezi Sun rebounded to win the prestigious G-1 Grand Prix de Paris. He did not race again until mid September when he ran third to Soldier of Fortune in the Prix Niel. In October he finished eighth in France's most prestigious race, the Prix de l'Arc de Triomphe. In contention during the final stretch run, eventual winner Dylan Thomas cut sharply in front of Zambezi Sun, but a claim of interference was rejected by the racing stewards.

Zambezi Sun was sent to race in the United States where he will race in 2009. His conditioning was handled by U.S. Racing Hall of Fame trainer, Bobby Frankel.
