= Willie the Kid =

Canadian-bred Thoroughbred racehorse

- Sire: Roselyon
- Grandsire: Sunstar
- Dam: Mintwina
- Damsire: Mint Briar
- Sex: Stallion
- Foaled: 1937
- Country: Canada
- Colour: Bay
- Breeder: William F. Morrissey
- Owner: Mildred A. Kane
- Trainer: Gordon J. McCann
- Record: 10: 3-4-0
- Earnings: $9,765

Major wins
- Canadian Classic Race wins: King's Plate (1940)

Willie the Kid (foaled 1937 in Ontario) was a Canadian Thoroughbred racehorse best known for winning the eighty-first running of the King's Plate, Canada's most important race and the oldest continuously run race in North America, having been founded in 1860.

Bred by Willie Morrissey, Willie the Kid got his owner's nickname. He was out of the mare Mintwina, who was also the dam of Morrissey's Canadian Horse Racing Hall of Fame inductee, Bunty Lawless. He was sired by Roselyon who had sired the 1930 King's Plate winner, Aymond. Roselyon was a son of the 1911 Epsom Derby winner and British Horseracing Hall of Fame inductee, Sunstar.

Willie the Kid raced under the name of Willie Morrissey's girlfriend, Miss Mildred A. Kane. Trained by Gordon McCann, the oft-injured colt did not race at age two but as a three-year-old won three times in ten starts. Ridden by Ronnie Nash, in the May 18, 1940 King's Plate Willie the Kid beat a field that included Curwen, the Harry Hatch-owned colt who had been sent off as the betting favorite. The victory marked the first time a female owner won the Plate, and it was the first of six career Plate wins for trainer Gordon McCann.

In the ensuing Prince of Wales Stakes, Willie the Kid again beat third-place finisher Curwen but was second to race winner, Hood. Willie the Kid came out of the race with an injury that ended his racing career. He was retired to stud duty but was not a success.

== Pedigree ==
Pedigree of Willie the Kid, bay colt, 1937
Sire Roselyon	Sunstar	Sundridge	Amphion*^
Sire Roselyon	Sunstar	Sundridge	Sierra
Sire Roselyon	Sunstar	Doris	Loved One
Sire Roselyon	Sunstar	Doris	Lauretta
Sire Roselyon	Desmond’s Rose	Desmond	St Simon*^
Sire Roselyon	Desmond’s Rose	Desmond	L’Abbesse de Jouarre
Sire Roselyon	Desmond’s Rose	Electric Rose	Lesterlin
Sire Roselyon	Desmond’s Rose	Electric Rose	Arc Light
Dam Mintwina	Mint Briar	Assagai	Spearmint
Dam Mintwina	Mint Briar	Assagai	Charm^
Dam Mintwina	Mint Briar	Sweet Briar II	St Frusquin^
Dam Mintwina	Mint Briar	Sweet Briar II	Presentation
Dam Mintwina	Edwina	Celt	Commando
Dam Mintwina	Edwina	Celt	Maid of Erin^
Dam Mintwina	Edwina	Lady Godiva	Hanover
Dam Mintwina	Edwina	Lady Godiva	Edith Gray (family: 23-b)

*^ Willie the Kid is inbred 4S x 5D x 5D to the stallion St Simon, meaning that he appears fourth generation once on the sire side of his pedigree and fifth generation twice (via Charm and St Frusquin)^ on the dam side of his pedigree.

*^ Willie the Kid is inbred 4S x 5D to the stallion Amphion, meaning that he appears fourth generation on the sire side of his pedigree and fifth generation (via Maid of Erin)^ on the dam side of his pedigree.
