= Clairvoyant (horse) =

French-bred Thoroughbred racehorse

- Sire: Mon Talisman
- Grandsire: Craig an Eran
- Dam: Cestona
- Damsire: Durbar
- Sex: Stallion
- Foaled: 1934
- Country: France
- Colour: Bay
- Owner: Miguel Martinez de Hoz
- Trainer: Frank Carter
- Record: 6: 5-0-0

Major wins
- Prix Matchem (1937); Prix Hocquart (1937); Prix Lupin (1937); Prix du Jockey Club (1937); Grand Prix de Paris (1937)

Clairvoyant (1934 – c. 1940) was a French Thoroughbred racehorse and sire. He won five of his six races was probably the best three-year-old colt in Europe in 1937 when he won the Prix Matchem, Prix Hocquart, Prix Lupin, Prix du Jockey Club and Grand Prix de Paris. He was retired to stud, but disappeared from the record during the Second World War: his final fate is unknown.

== Background ==
Clairvoyant was a bay horse with a narrow white blaze and white socks on his hind feet bred in France by his owner Miguel Martinez de Hoz. He was sired by Martinez de Hoz's stallion Mon Talisman who won the Prix du Jockey Club and the Prix de l'Arc de Triomphe in 1927. Clairvoyant's dam Cestona was a great-granddaughter of Sister Lumley, a broodmare whose descendants have included Storm Bird, Observatory and Nuccio (Prix de l'Arc de Triomphe). The colt was trained at Chantilly by Frank Carter (1880–1937)

== Racing career ==
=== 1937: three-year-old season ===
Clairvoyant won three races in the spring of 1927. At Maisons-Laffitte Racecourse he won the Prix Matchem from Atys, with Galloway, the winner of the Prix de Cabourg and Prix de Condé in third place. At Longchamp Racecourse on 9 May he won the Prix Hocquart over 2400 metres, beating Zurs and Saint Preux. In the Prix Lupin over 2100 metres at the same course he defeated a field which included the Poule d'Essai des Poulains winner Drap d'Or and the Prix Noailles winner Actor.

In June, Clairvoyant started 3/5 favourite in a twelve-runner field for the 200th running of the Prix du Jockey Club over 2400 metres at Chantilly. Ridden by Charles Semblat, he won by one and a half lengths from Actor with Galloway in third, taking a first prize of ₣347,700. Four weeks later, the colt was moved up in distance for the ₣1,067,200 Grand Prix de Paris over 3000 metres at Longchamp. The race attracted a field of twenty-four runners, including seven from England. Clairvoyant started the 2.1/1 favourite with his main opposition appearing likely to come from the Italian-trained Donatello, who was unbeaten in eight races including the Italian Derby. With Semblat again in the saddle, he was not among the early leaders, but made rapid progress on the inside rail to take the lead in the straight. He went clear of the field and held off a late challenge from Donatello to win by three-quarters of a length with Gonfalonier, the winner of the Prix Saint-Roman and Prix La Force two lengths back in third.

In the autumn of 1937 it was announced that Clairvoyant would not run again that year, "all being not well with him".

== Stud record ==
Clairvoyant was retired to stud in 1939 but had little chance to establish himself as a breeding stallion. He was one of many leading French horses who went missing following the Fall of France in 1940. One report stated that he had been slaughtered for horsemeat by French refugees.

== Assessment ==
In their book A Century of Champions, based on a modified version of the Timeform system, John Randall and Tony Morris rated Clairvoyant the one hundred and ninety-ninth best racehorse of twentieth century, the forty-first best horse of the century to have been trained in France, and the second best horse foaled in 1934 after War Admiral.

== Pedigree ==
Pedigree of Clairvoyant (FR), bay stallion, 1934
Sire Mon Talisman (FR) 1924	Craig an Eran (GB); 1918	Sunstar	Sundridge
Sire Mon Talisman (FR) 1924	Craig an Eran (GB); 1918	Sunstar	Doris
Sire Mon Talisman (FR) 1924	Craig an Eran (GB); 1918	Maid of the Mist	Cyllene*
Sire Mon Talisman (FR) 1924	Craig an Eran (GB); 1918	Maid of the Mist	Sceptre
Sire Mon Talisman (FR) 1924	Ruthene (GB); 1918	Lemberg	Cyllene*
Sire Mon Talisman (FR) 1924	Ruthene (GB); 1918	Lemberg	Galicia
Sire Mon Talisman (FR) 1924	Ruthene (GB); 1918	Karenza	William the Third
Sire Mon Talisman (FR) 1924	Ruthene (GB); 1918	Karenza	Cassinia
Dam Cestona (FR) 1925	Durbar (FR); 1911	Rabelais	St Simon*
Dam Cestona (FR) 1925	Durbar (FR); 1911	Rabelais	Satirical
Dam Cestona (FR) 1925	Durbar (FR); 1911	Armenia	Meddler
Dam Cestona (FR) 1925	Durbar (FR); 1911	Armenia	Urania
Dam Cestona (FR) 1925	Cestus (GB); 1910	St Amant	St Frusquin*
Dam Cestona (FR) 1925	Cestus (GB); 1910	St Amant	Lady Loverule
Dam Cestona (FR) 1925	Cestus (GB); 1910	Abbotts Anne	Right-Away
Dam Cestona (FR) 1925	Cestus (GB); 1910	Abbotts Anne	Sister Lumley (Family:4-j)

* Clairvoyant is inbred 4S x 4S to the stallion Cyllene, meaning that he appears fourth generation twice on the sire side of his pedigree.

* Clairvoyant is inbred 4D x 5D to the stallion St Simon, meaning that he appears fourth generation and fifth generation (via St Frusquin) on the dam side of his pedigree.
