= Mon Talisman =

French Thoroughbred racehorse

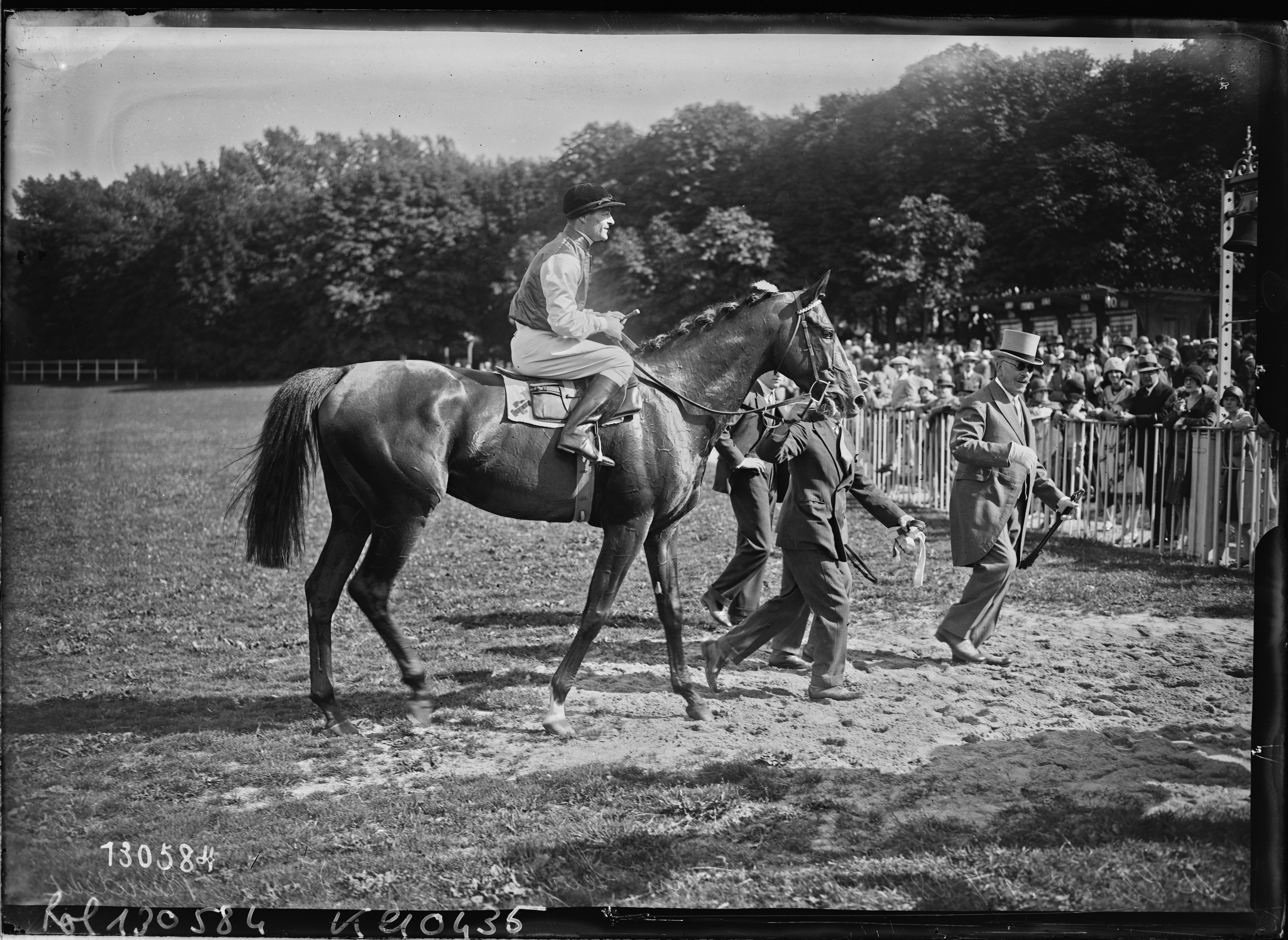
- Prix du Président de la République (1 July 1928, Saint-Cloud)
- Sire: Craig An Eran
- Grandsire: Sunstar
- Dam: Ruthene
- Damsire: Lemberg
- Sex: Stallion
- Foaled: 1924
- Country: France
- Colour: Bay
- Breeder: Guillermo Ham
- Owner: Miguel Edouard Martinez de Hoz
- Trainer: Frank Carter
- Record: 8: 6-2-0
- Earnings: 1,994,800 francs

Major wins
- Prix Juigné (1927); Prix Daru (1927); Prix Lupin (1927); Prix du Jockey Club (1927); Prix de l'Arc de Triomphe (1927); Prix du Président de la République (1928)

Mon Talisman (1924 – ca. 1940) was a French Thoroughbred racehorse. He was unraced as a two-year-old but made an immediate impact as a three-year-old in 1927, winning his first four races, the Prix Juigné, Prix Daru, Prix Lupin and Prix du Jockey Club. After being beaten by Fiterari in the Grand Prix de Paris he returned in the autumn to win the Prix de l'Arc de Triomphe. He won the Prix du Président de la République on his only appearance in 1928 and was then retired to stud. He had moderate success as a breeding stallion before his disappearance in 1940.

== Background ==
Mon Talisman was a bay horse with a narrow white blaze bred in France by Guillermo Ham. He was sired by Craig an Eran, the winner of the 1921 2000 Guineas and Eclipse Stakes, His grandsire Sunstar won the 2000 Guineas and Epsom Derby in 1911 before becoming a successful stud; apart from Craig an Eran, notable offspring included the 1917 Epsom Oaks Sunny Jane. Mon Talisman's dam Ruthene was a half-sister of the leading sprinter Ethnarch and a great-granddaughter of Scene, an influential broodmare whose other descendants have included Animal Kingdom.

During his racing career, Mon Talisman was owned by the Argentinian Miguel Edouard Martinez de Hoz and was trained in France by Frank Carter.

== Racing career ==
=== 1927: three-year-old season ===
Mon Talisman was unraced as a two-year-old and began his racing career with a win in the Prix Juigné over 2100 metres at Longchamp Racecourse. On his next appearance, the colt won the Prix Daru (a race for three-year-olds whose dams had not been bred in France) over the same course and distance. In May, Mon Talisman won again, taking the Prix Lupin at Longchamp.

In the Prix du Jockey Club over 2400 metres at Chantilly Racecourse, Mon Talisman started 3/5 favourite in a field of seventeen. Ridden by Charles Semblat he won easily by two lengths from Fiterari with Basilisque a further two lengths back in third. On his next appearance, the colt contested the most prestigious French race for three-year-olds, the Grand Prix de Paris over 3000 metres at Longchamp. He started favourite but was unsuited by the heavy ground and was beaten one and a half lengths into second place by Fiterari.

In October, Mon Talisman was matched against older horses for the first time when he contested the eighth running of the Prix de l'Arc de Triomphe over 2400 metres at Longchamp. Ridden by Semblat, he started the 2.4/1 favourite in a ten-runner field. He won by two lengths from Nino (twice winner of the Prix du Président de la République), with two and a half lengths back to Felton in third. On his final appearance of the season, Mon Talisman finished second to Fiterari in the Prix Royal-Oak.

=== 1928: four-year-old season ===
On his first and only appearance as a four-year-old, Mon Talisman contested the Prix du Président de la République over 2500 metres at Saint-Cloud Racecourse and won from Banstar and Leonidas.

== Stud record ==
At the end of his racing career, Mon Talisman was retired to become a breeding stallion in France. He was not a conspicuous success but did sire one outstanding horse, Clairvoyant who won the Prix du Jockey Club and the Grand Prix de Paris in 1937. Mon Talisman disappeared following the Fall of France in 1940. One report stated that he had been slaughtered for horsemeat by French refugees.

== Assessment ==
In their book A Century of Champions, based on a modified version of the Timeform system, John Randall and Tony Morris rated Mon Talisman a "superior" winner of the Prix de l'Arc de Triomphe. They rated him the one hundred and thirty-third best racehorse of twentieth century, the twenty-seventh best horse of the century to have been trained in France, and the best horse foaled in 1924.

== Sire line tree ==
- Mon Talisman
  - Almaska
  - Morvillars
  - Magnetique
    - Heres
      - Herodes
  - Clairvoyant
    - Seer
  - Talma
  - Lindor

== Pedigree ==
Pedigree of Mon Talisman (FR), bay stallion, 1924
Sire Craig an Eran (GB) 1918	Sunstar (GB); 1908	Sundridge	Amphion
Sire Craig an Eran (GB) 1918	Sunstar (GB); 1908	Sundridge	Sierra
Sire Craig an Eran (GB) 1918	Sunstar (GB); 1908	Doris	Loved One
Sire Craig an Eran (GB) 1918	Sunstar (GB); 1908	Doris	Lauretta
Sire Craig an Eran (GB) 1918	Maid of the Mist (GB); 1906	Cyllene*	Bona Vista*
Sire Craig an Eran (GB) 1918	Maid of the Mist (GB); 1906	Cyllene*	Arcadia*
Sire Craig an Eran (GB) 1918	Maid of the Mist (GB); 1906	Sceptre	Persimmon^
Sire Craig an Eran (GB) 1918	Maid of the Mist (GB); 1906	Sceptre	Ornament
Dam Ruthene (GB) 1918	Lemberg (GB); 1907	Cyllene*	Bona Vista*
Dam Ruthene (GB) 1918	Lemberg (GB); 1907	Cyllene*	Arcadia*
Dam Ruthene (GB) 1918	Lemberg (GB); 1907	Galicia	Galopin^
Dam Ruthene (GB) 1918	Lemberg (GB); 1907	Galicia	Isoletta
Dam Ruthene (GB) 1918	Karenza (GB); 1910	William the Third	St Simon^
Dam Ruthene (GB) 1918	Karenza (GB); 1910	William the Third	Gravity
Dam Ruthene (GB) 1918	Karenza (GB); 1910	Cassinia	Carbine
Dam Ruthene (GB) 1918	Karenza (GB); 1910	Cassinia	Scene (Family: 1-h)

* Mon Talisman is inbred 3S x 3D to the stallion Cyllene, meaning that he appears third generation on the sire side of his pedigree and third generation on the dam side of his pedigree.

*^ Mon Talisman is inbred 5S x 4D to the stallion St Simon, meaning that he appears fifth generation (via Persimmon)^ on the sire side of his pedigree and fourth generation on the dam side of his pedigree.

*^ Mon Talisman is inbred 6S x 4D x 5D to the stallion Galopin, meaning that he appears sixth generation (via Persimmon)^ on the sire side of his pedigree and fourth generation and fifth generation (via St Simon)^ on the dam side of his pedigree.
