= Amphion (horse) =

British-bred Thoroughbred racehorse

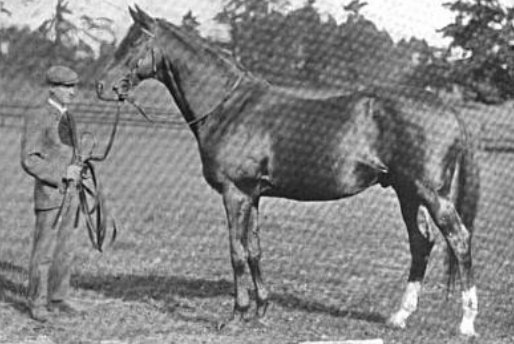
- Sire: Rosebery
- Grandsire: Speculum
- Dam: Suicide
- Damsire: Hermit
- Sex: Stallion
- Foaled: 1886
- Died: 30 October 1906 (aged 19–20)
- Country: Great Britain
- Colour: Chestnut
- Breeder: G. S. Thompson
- Owner: General Byrne
- Trainer: Mr. Chandler
- Record: 24 starts 14 wins

Major wins
- Great Jubilee Stakes (1889); Fern Hill Stakes (1889); New Biennial Stakes (1890); Hardwicke Stakes (1890); Lancashire Plate (1890); Champion Stakes (1890); March Stakes (1891); Rous Memorial Stakes (1891)

Amphion (1886 – 30 October 1906) was a British Thoroughbred racehorse. He won some minor races as a two-year-old, but was not entered into any of the Classics. As a three-year-old he won several races including the Great Jubilee Stakes. He improved again as a four-year-old, winning the Hardwicke Stakes, Lancashire Plate and Champion Stakes, beating several classic winners in the process. He remained in training as a five-year-old, winning the March Stakes and Rous Memorial Stakes. Amphion was trained by Mr. Chandler and owned by General Byrne. As a stallion he sired several top class horses including the sprinter Sundridge, Champion Stakes winner Dieudonne and Eclipse Stakes winner Lally.

== Background ==
Amphion was a chestnut colt foaled in 1886 and bred by G. S. Thompson. He was sired by either Speculum or his son Rosebery. Speculum was champion sire of Great Britain in 1878, when his son Sefton won the Derby. Rosebery won both the Cesarewitch Handicap and Cambridgeshire Handicap in 1876. The uncertainty over his paternity was due to Speculum dying shortly after covering Amphion's dam. His dam then came in heat and she was covered again by Rosebery. Amphion's dam was Suicide, a daughter of Hermit.

Amphion was purchased for General Byrne by Mr. Chandler as a yearling for 350 guineas. Chandler trained him throughout his racing career.

== Racing career ==
=== 1888: Two-year-old season ===
Amphion's first race was the five-furlong Spring Two-year-old Race at Croyden on 20 April 1888. He started as the 2/1 favourite, with L'Abbesse de Jouarre next at 5/2. Amphion won the race by three lengths from Ravenswood, with third placed Outcry a further two lengths behind. On 27 June he started as the odds-on favourite for the Champagne Stakes at Stockbridge. He was near the fore in the early stages of the five-furlong race and in the last few hundred yards he pulled away to win by a length from Kettlebury. One month later Amphion started as the 1/2 favourite for the Great Kingston Two-year-old race at Sandown Park. Ridden by Tom Cannon, he won the race easily by two lengths from Yard Arm.

In October he carried top weight for the seven-furlong Champion Nursery Handicap at Kempton Park. He was near the rear of the field from the start of the race and never challenged the leaders, finishing in seventh place behind winner Fleur de Lys. In his final race of the season he carried top weight again for the Chesterfield Nursery Handicap at the Derby November Meeting. The race was won by Eulalia and Amphion was unable to finish in the top ten.

=== 1889: Three-year-old season ===
In April 1889 he started as the 5/2 favourite to win the Doveridge Handicap at Derby. He got to the front with a quarter of a mile left to run and went on to win by one and a half lengths from the colt Johnny Morgan. In May he started as a 100/8 outsider for the Great Jubilee Stakes, run over one mile at Kempton Park. He got away to a good start and led the field, but was soon overtaken by Screech Owl, with Orbit following Amphion in third place. The first two places remained unchanged and Amphion moved up and overtook Screech Owl with about 300 yards left to run. Amphion then pulled away to win by three lengths from Screech Owl, with The Rejected a similar distance behind Screech Owl in third place.

At Royal Ascot he started as the odds-on favourite for the five-furlong Fern Hill Stakes. In the early stages of the race he was second, behind leader L'Abbe Morin. Amphion closed right up to L'Abbe Morin with a quarter of a mile left to run. He overtook him in the closing stages to win easily by one and a half lengths. At Glorious Goodwood he started at the odds of 100/14 for the six-furlong Stewards' Cup. As the field entered the closing stages of the race he closing in on leader Dog Rose (who was carrying a stone less weight), but just failed to catch him by a neck. Noble Chieftain was three quarters of a lengths behind Amphion in third place. At the Newmarket Houghton Meeting, Amphion finished second in the Free Handicap Sweepstakes, two lengths behind winner Ormuz. His final race as a three-year-old came in late November in the Manchester Handicap, run over one mile and six furlongs at Manchester Racecourse. He could not challenge the leaders and finished a long way behind winner Fallow Chat.

=== 1890: Four-year-old season ===
On 25 April 1890 he carried top wright in the Esher Stakes at Sandown Park. He never challenged the leaders but kept on to finish fourth behind winner Sainfoin. In May he attempted to win a second Great Jubilee Stakes and was challenging until the final furlong, when he faded and finished in fifth place behind winner The Imp. On 19 June at Royal Ascot, Lord George was his only opponent for the New Biennial Stakes. Amphion stayed behind Lord George until they entered the final furlong, where he pulled clear to win by one and a half lengths. The following day he started in the Hardwicke Stakes. Sainfoin, who had since won the Derby, was the even money favourite. Surefoot, who had won the 2000 Guineas, was next in the betting at 2/1. Amphion was priced at 6/1, with the other two runners, Hayraddin and Nunthorpe both on offer at 20/1. Hayraddin led Sainfoin and Amphion away from the start. After half a mile had been run Surefoot took third as Amphion dropped back. In the finishing straight Sainfoin pulled clear and was followed by Surefoot and Amphion. With one furlong left to run Surefoot began to fade and Amphion had drawn level with Sainfoin. Amphion took the lead and won by a length from Sainfoin, with Surefoot a further four lengths back in third place.

On 8 September he started as the 11/8 favourite for the £11,000 Lancashire Plate at Manchester and was ridden by Tom Cannon. After the nine-runner field had run a furlong Amphion was in sixth place, with the filly by Foxhall leading the race by a couple of lengths. As they turned into the finishing straight, the Foxhall filly was just leading from Martago, with Orvieto in third place. At this point Orvieto swerved off the racing line and cut back in again. This caused interference to Amphion (who was nearly brought down), St. Serf and Orion. For a short time Cannon lost hold of the reins, but soon recovered. As they entered the final furlong, Margaton drew up to the long-time leader, the pair being just in front of Amphion. Cannon then asked Amphion for an effort and he took the lead and went on to win by one and a half lengths from Margaton. The Foxhall filly was third and Orion fourth.

On 9 October, it was sunny at Newmarket, and the ground was hard. Only Amphion, Blue Green and Memoir started in the Champion Stakes. Blue Green led from Memoir in the early stages, with Amphion a couple of lengths behind the pair. Blue Green faded away with over two furlongs to run and Memoir took over the lead. Amphion then closed up to Memoir and drew past to win easily by three lengths from Memoir, with Blue Green (who finished lame) a distant third. At the Newmarket Houghton meeting he finished second to Sheen in a £1,000 Plate. The pair had started as joint-favourites, but Sheen pulled away in the final two furlongs to win by three lengths.

=== 1891: Five-year-old season ===
Amphion reappeared as a four-year-old in the March Stakes at Newmarket on 30 April 1891. He started as the 5/2 favourite for the one-mile race, in which Cannon placed him at the rear of the field, which was led by Star and Le Nord. At the halfway point, Amphion had made up some ground and was just behind the leaders. He then went past them and won by one and a half lengths from the colt Mark Price, who was a neck in front of third placed Mons Meg. At Royal Ascot in June he faced only two rivals in the Rous Memorial Stakes. He started as a long odds-on favourite and had the race won by the halfway point, cantering home to win by two lengths from Signorina. He then walked over for the Stockbridge Cup later in the month. On 23 September he ran in the Leicestershire Royal Handicap, which was run over about one mile at Leicester Racecourse. He was assigned a weight of 10 st 7 lb, with the next horse in the weights being Reverend at 8 st 12 lb. By the end of his racing career he was won 14 of his 24 starts and earned almost £21,000 in prize money.

== Assessment ==
At the end of 1889 many people thought Amphion was a better horse than Donovan, who had won several top races that year, including the Derby, St. Leger and Lancashire Plate.

== Stud career ==
General Byrne declined an offer of 20,000 guineas for Amphion. By the beginning of 1892 he had a full book of mares for both the 1892 and 1893 seasons at a fee of 150 guineas. In 1894 he moved from the Royal Stud to Compton Stud in Sandley near Gillingham. He became a successful stallion and his best racing progeny were:

- Amphora (1893) – won the Gimcrack Stakes as a two-year-old and the Stewards' Cup as a four-year-old.
- Altesse (1894) – won the Stewards' Cup in 1898.
- Dieudonne (1895) – won the Middle Park Plate in 1897, the St. George Stakes in 1898 and the Champion Stakes in 1899.
- Sundridge (1898) – a top sprinter whose wins included three July Cups and two King's Stand Stakes. Sundridge was also a successful stallion, becoming champion sire of Great Britain in 1911, the year his son Sunstar won the 2000 Guineas and Derby.
- Lally (1903) – won the Eclipse Stakes.

Amphion was put down on 30 October 1906, after suffering from paralysis in his hind quarters.

== Sire line tree ==
- Amphion
  - Rampion
  - Horoscope
  - Isador
    - Israelite
    - Sir John Johnson
  - Dieudonne
    - Astronomer
      - Sunny Slope
    - Wotan
  - Eminent
  - Ampelion
  - Lally
    - Limelight
      - Salitros
    - By George!
      - George Lowe
    - Canova
    - Defone
    - Major
      - Alom
  - Acclaim
  - Elmstead
  - The Nut
  - Sundridge
    - Sunflower
      - Argonne
    - The Story
      - Lohengrin
        - Rys
      - Javornik
        - Auf Zum Runden
    - Sunbright
    - Sunder
      - Sundari
        - Songe
      - Syndrian
      - Sicyon
      - San-Utar
    - Sunningdale
    - Sunspot
    - Theo Bold
    - Absurd
      - Listowel
      - Absurdum
      - Grotesque
      - Joculator
      - Mermin
      - Thespian
        - Johnathan
      - The Dunce
      - The Monk
      - Lysander
    - White Star
      - Talisman
    - Golden Sun
      - Equator
    - Radiant
    - Sun Yat
    - White Magic
      - Marvex
    - Happy Warrior
      - Lavengro
      - Medal
    - Sunny Lake
      - Sunart
    - Sunfire
    - Argos
      - Diomedes
        - Who's He
          - Camprodon
        - Shalfleet
      - Adieu
    - Figaro
    - Prince Eugene
    - Sun Briar
      - Sun Flag
      - Pompey
        - Osculator
        - Caesars Ghost
        - Ladysman
        - Pompoon
        - Strobo
        - Rippey
      - Sun Beau
      - Sun Edwin
      - Sun Craig
        - Shepperton
      - Firethorn
        - Pukka Gin
      - Sun Egret
    - Sunreigh
      - Reigh Count
        - Count Arthur
        - Count Morse
        - Count Stone
        - Count Fleet
        - Do-Reigh-Mi
        - Triplicate
        - Adonis
        - Count Speed
    - Niceas
    - Sunstar
      - Star Hawk
        - Red Hawk
        - Frisius
      - North Star III
        - Busy American
        - Oil Man
        - Boot To Boot
        - Bubbling Over
        - Buddy Bauer
        - Belli Casus
      - Sanitar
        - Polus
      - Blink
        - Blanc
        - Brientz
        - Twink
      - Helion
        - Argonaute
        - Ingre
      - Sir Berkeley
        - Sunny View
        - Spianto
      - Sky-Rocket
      - Somme Kiss
        - Reedsmouth
      - Buchan
        - Bucellas
        - Vitality
        - Bicarbonate
        - Buckler
        - Buckfast
        - Shian Mor
        - Dancing Floor
        - Cockpen
        - Janus
        - Mr Standfast
        - Soon Over
        - John James
        - Night Owl
      - Cygnus
        - Poor Lad
        - Colonel Cygnus
      - Galloper Light
        - Kentish Knock
        - Light Carbine
        - Baralong
        - Tattoo
        - Whirlwind
        - Reflector
        - Nicolo Pisano
        - Present
      - Kentish Cob
      - Roselyon
        - Aymond
        - Willie the Kid
      - Australian Sun
        - In The Shade
      - Daylight Patrol
      - Southern
        - Oduagis
      - Alan Breck
        - Carlsminde
        - Fernkloof
        - Mountain Lad
        - Tresiete
        - Mar Caspio
        - Mandante
        - Banderin
        - Respingo
      - Craig an Eran
        - Lavina
        - Mon Talisman
        - Cragadour
        - Hazrat
        - April the Fifth
        - Admiral Drake
      - Stardrift
        - Madstar
      - Sunblaze
      - Thunderer
        - Roar
      - Great Star
        - Great Legend
      - Satelles
        - Crucis
      - Scopas
        - Scapino
        - Manganello
      - Villars
        - Dzems
        - Frajer
        - Krater
        - Wisus
        - Leb W Leb
        - Jon
        - Maciek
      - Light Hand
        - Leander
        - Leu
        - Boho
        - Situtunga
      - Rosewing
      - Saltash
        - Strephon
      - Arausio
      - Sunstone
      - Zodiac
        - Cullingham
      - Sagacity
        - Fantasio
        - Tabula Rasa
      - Sherwood Starr
        - Rock Star
        - Robber Chief
      - Star Of Pride
        - Wellbourne Jake
      - Sunderland
      - Zambo
        - Le Becau
        - Jumbo
      - Aramis
        - Timely
      - Banstar
        - L'Ouragan
      - Plimsol
      - British Empire
      - Burnewang

== Pedigree ==
Pedigree of Amphion, chestnut stallion, 1886
Sire Rosebery (GB; b. 1872)	Speculum (b. 1865)	Vedette	Voltigeur
Sire Rosebery (GB; b. 1872)	Speculum (b. 1865)	Vedette	Mrs Ridgway
Sire Rosebery (GB; b. 1872)	Speculum (b. 1865)	Doralice	Orlando^
Sire Rosebery (GB; b. 1872)	Speculum (b. 1865)	Doralice	Preserve
Sire Rosebery (GB; b. 1872)	Ladylike (br. 1854)	Newminster*	Touchstone*^
Sire Rosebery (GB; b. 1872)	Ladylike (br. 1854)	Newminster*	Beeswing*
Sire Rosebery (GB; b. 1872)	Ladylike (br. 1854)	Zuleika	Muley Moloch
Sire Rosebery (GB; b. 1872)	Ladylike (br. 1854)	Zuleika	Corumba
Dam Suicide (GB) br. 1876	Hermit (GB) ch. 1864	Newminster* b. 1848	Touchstone*^
Dam Suicide (GB) br. 1876	Hermit (GB) ch. 1864	Newminster* b. 1848	Beeswing*
Dam Suicide (GB) br. 1876	Hermit (GB) ch. 1864	Seclusion b. 1857	Tadmor
Dam Suicide (GB) br. 1876	Hermit (GB) ch. 1864	Seclusion b. 1857	Miss Sellon
Dam Suicide (GB) br. 1876	Ratcatcher's Daughter (GB) br. 1862	Rataplan ch. 1850	The Baron
Dam Suicide (GB) br. 1876	Ratcatcher's Daughter (GB) br. 1862	Rataplan ch. 1850	Pocahontas
Dam Suicide (GB) br. 1876	Ratcatcher's Daughter (GB) br. 1862	Lady Alicia br. 1852	Melbourne
Dam Suicide (GB) br. 1876	Ratcatcher's Daughter (GB) br. 1862	Lady Alicia br. 1852	Testy

Note: b. = Bay, br. = Brown, ch. = Chestnut

* Amphion is inbred 3S x 3D to the stallion Newminster, meaning that he appears third generation on the sire side of his pedigree and third generation on the dam side of his pedigree.

*^ Amphion is inbred 5S x 4S x 4D to the stallion Touchstone, meaning that he appears fifth generation (via Orlando)^ and fourth generation on the sire side of his pedigree and fourth generation on the dam side of his pedigree.
