= Phil Drake =

French-bred Thoroughbred racehorse

- Sire: Admiral Drake
- Grandsire: Craig an Eran
- Dam: Philippa
- Damsire: Vatellor
- Sex: Stallion
- Foaled: 1952
- Country: France
- Colour: Brown
- Breeder: Suzy Volterra
- Owner: Suzy Volterra
- Trainer: François Mathet
- Record: 5: 3-1-0

Major wins
- Prix La Rochette (1955); Epsom Derby (1955); Grand Prix de Paris (1955)

Phil Drake (1952–1964) was a French Thoroughbred racehorse and sire. In a brief racing career which lasted from May to July 1955, Phil Drake ran five times and won three races, becoming the fifth and last horse to win both The Derby and the Grand Prix de Paris.

== Background ==
Phil Drake, a brown horse with a white stripe was bred in France by his owner Mme Leon "Suzy" Volterra. His sire Admiral Drake was a top class racehorse who won the Grand Prix de Paris in 1934. Phil Drake's dam, Philippa, was a successful racehorse who also produced the Prix Morny winner Bozet. Phil Drake was trained by François Mathet at Chantilly.

== Racing career ==
=== 1955: three-year-old season ===
Phil Drake was a slow maturing colt who did not race as a two-year-old. He made his first racecourse appearance in the spring of 1955 when he ran second in the Prix Juigné, finishing strongly and narrowly failing to catch his stable companion Datour. The colt developed respiratory problems after the race and his connections considered "scratching" him (withdrawing his entry) from the Derby. In May, however, he won the three-year-old division of the Prix La Rochette at Longchamp in impressive style to establish himself as a Derby contender. Before the news of his victory reached England some "astute punters" backed him for the Derby at odds of up to 50/1.

In the Derby, he started at 100/8 in a field of twenty-three and was ridden by Freddie Palmer, in front of a crowd estimated at 200,000 including the Queen. Phil Drake was held up by Palmer in the early stages and was not in the first fifteen at half way. In the straight he produced a sustained run to move through the field, but was still only sixth entering the final furlong as the 100/1 Irish colt Panaslipper went clear. In the closing stages Phil Drake was switched to the inside and produced a "tremendous finishing burst" to overtake Panaslipper and win going away by one and a half lengths, with the 11/4 favourite, Acropolis a further three lengths back in third.

Later in June he won the Grand Prix de Paris at Longchamp, beating the Prix du Jockey Club winner Rapace, and becoming the fifth and last horse to win the Derby-Grand Prix double, following Gladiateur, Cremorne, Spearmint and My Love. On his final start, Phil Drake ran in Britain's most valuable race, the King George VI and Queen Elizabeth Stakes at Ascot for which he started 8/11 favourite. After making a brief effort in the straight he faded to finish sixth of the ten runners behind Vimy.

== Assessment ==
In their book A Century of Champions, John Randall and Tony Morris rated Phil Drake an "average" Derby winner.

Timeform rated Phil Drake on a mark of 132. A rating of 130 is considered the mark of an above average European Group One winner.

== Stud career ==
The best of Phil Drake's offspring was Dicta Drake, who won the Coronation Cup and the Grand Prix de Saint-Cloud.

== Sire line tree ==
- Phil Drake
  - Esquimau
  - Dicta Drake
    - Dan Kano
  - Aetone

== Pedigree ==
Pedigree of Phil Drake (FR), brown stallion, 1952
Sire Admiral Drake (FR) 1931	Craig an Eran; 1918	Sunstar	Sundridge
Sire Admiral Drake (FR) 1931	Craig an Eran; 1918	Sunstar	Doris
Sire Admiral Drake (FR) 1931	Craig an Eran; 1918	Maid of the Mist	Cyllene
Sire Admiral Drake (FR) 1931	Craig an Eran; 1918	Maid of the Mist	Sceptre
Sire Admiral Drake (FR) 1931	Plucky Liege; 1912	Spearmint	Carbine
Sire Admiral Drake (FR) 1931	Plucky Liege; 1912	Spearmint	Maid of the Mint
Sire Admiral Drake (FR) 1931	Plucky Liege; 1912	Concertina	St Simon
Sire Admiral Drake (FR) 1931	Plucky Liege; 1912	Concertina	Comic Song
Dam Philippa (FR) 1943	Vatellor; 1933	Vatout	Prince Chimay
Dam Philippa (FR) 1943	Vatellor; 1933	Vatout	Vashti
Dam Philippa (FR) 1943	Vatellor; 1933	Lady Elinor	Teddy*
Dam Philippa (FR) 1943	Vatellor; 1933	Lady Elinor	Madame Royale
Dam Philippa (FR) 1943	Philippa of Hainault; 1932	Teddy*	Ajax
Dam Philippa (FR) 1943	Philippa of Hainault; 1932	Teddy*	Rondeau
Dam Philippa (FR) 1943	Philippa of Hainault; 1932	Pride of Hainault	Hainault
Dam Philippa (FR) 1943	Philippa of Hainault; 1932	Pride of Hainault	Matragons Pride (Family: 8-i)

* Phil Drake is inbred 4D x 3D to the stallion Teddy, meaning that he appears fourth generation and third generation on the dam side of his pedigree.
