= Tanerko =

French-bred Thoroughbred racehorse

- Sire: Tantieme
- Grandsire: Deux-Pour-Cent
- Dam: La Divine
- Damsire: Fair Copy
- Sex: Stallion
- Foaled: 3 May 1953
- Country: France
- Colour: Bay
- Breeder: François Dupré
- Owner: François Dupré
- Trainer: François Mathet
- Record: 17: 10-2-3

Major wins
- Prix Juigné (1956); Prix Noailles (1956); Prix Lupin (1956); Prix du Prince d'Orange (1956, 1957); Prix Ganay (1957, 1958); Grand Prix de Saint-Cloud (1957, 1958); Prix d'Harcourt (1958)

Awards
- Timeform rating 134 (1958)

Tanerko (3 May 1953 – 1972) was a French Thoroughbred racehorse and sire. He was unraced as a two-year-old but established himself as one of the best colts of his generation in Europe in 1956 by winning the Prix Juigné, Prix Noailles, Prix Lupin and Prix du Prince d'Orange as well as finishing third to Ribot in the Prix de l'Arc de Triomphe. He remained in training in 1957, winning the Prix du Prince d'Orange and recording other important victories in the Prix Ganay and the Grand Prix de Saint-Cloud. He was as good as ever in a five-year-old, taking the Prix d'Harcourt and repeating his 1957 wins in the Prix Ganay and the Grand Prix de Saint-Cloud. Tanerko was then retired to stud and had considerable success as a sire of winners.

== Background ==
Tanerko was a bay horse with a white star and white markings on all four feet bred in France by his owner François Dupré. He was sired by Dupre's stallion Tantieme the double winner of the Prix de l'Arc de Triomphe who went on to be the champion sire in France in 1962 and 1965. Tanerko's dam La Divine was a half-sister to Chanteur who won the Coronation Cup in 1947 as well as numerous good races in France. Tanerko was trained at Chantilly by François Mathet.

== Racing career ==
=== 1956: three-year-old season ===
Tanerko began his racing career by winning the Prix Juigné, a contest for previously unraced three-year-olds over 2100 metres at Longchamp Racecourse. He then recorded wins in two of the major trial races for the Prix du Jockey Club, taking the Prix Noailles over 2200 metres in late April and the Prix Lupin over 2100 metres in May. He was then moved up in distance for the Prix du Jockey Club over 2400 metres at Chantilly Racecourse in June and finished third behind Marcel Boussac's Philius who won by two lengths from Saint Raphael.

In September, Tanerko returned from a three-month break to win the Prix du Prince d'Orange over 2400 metres at Longchamp in which he was matched against older horses for the first time. In October, Tanerko contested France's most valuable and prestigious race, the Prix de l'Arc de Triomphe over the same course and distance as the Prix du Prince d'Orange. He finished third of the twenty runners, beaten six lengths and two lengths behind Ribot who was winning the race for the second time and the Irish Derby winner Talgo. On his final appearance of the season, Tanerko was dropped back in distance for the Prix de la Forêt over 1400 metres and finished second to the filly Midget.

=== 1957: four-year-old season ===
On his first appearance as a four-year-old, Tanerko finished third to Tapioca in the Prix d'Harcourt over 2100 metres at Longchamp in April. Later that month, ridden by Jacques Doyasbère he won the Prix Ganay over 2000 metres, beating the dual Prix d'Ispahan winner Fric, with Chief in third place. He was then dropped back in distance and finished second to Chief in the Prix d'Ispahan over 1850 metres in June. In the following month, Tanerko was ridden by Guy Lequeux when he contested the Grand Prix de Saint-Cloud over 2500 metres and won from the three-year-old Franc Luron, with Haut Brion in third place.

Tanerko returned in September and attempted to repeat his 1956 success in the Prix du Prince d'Orange. He was again partnered by Doyasbère and won from Oroso and Tapioca. On his final appearance of the season, Tanerko finished unplaced behind Oroso in the Prix de l'Arc de Triomphe.

=== 1958: five-year-old season ===
Tanerko began his third season with a victory in the Prix d'Harcourt, beating Tapioca and Fric. On his next appearance, the horse repeated his 1957 success in the Prix Ganay, beating Blockhaus and Primesautier, two horses who went on to finish first and second in the Prix d'Ispahan. In July, Tanerko won the Grand Prix de Saint-Cloud, beating the four-year-old filly Denisy who had finished second in the 1957 Arc de Triomphe, with Flying Relic in third.

== Stud record ==
Tanerko was retired from racing to become a breeding stallion in 1959. The best and most famous of his offspring was Relko, whose wins included The Derby, Poule d'Essai des Poulains, Prix Royal-Oak, Prix Ganay, Grand Prix de Saint-Cloud and Coronation Cup. Other good winners sired by Tanerko included White Label (Grand Prix de Paris), Ebano (Preis von Europa), Kamaraan (Prix du Conseil de Paris), Sharapour (Prix Dollar), Caracol (Grosser Preis von Baden) and Orvilliers (Grande Course de Haies d'Auteuil). He was also a leading sire of broodmares and steeplechasers. Cambri Champion two-year-old filly in Mexico.

== Assessment ==
The independent Timeform organisation awarded Tanerko a peak rating of 134 in 1958, two pounds behind the top-rated Ballymoss.

In their book A Century of Champions, based on a modified version of the Timeform system, John Randall and Tony Morris rated Tanerko the one hundred and seventy-eighth best racehorse of twentieth century, the thirty-sixth best horse of the century to have been trained in France, and the best horse foaled in 1953.

== Pedigree ==
Pedigree of Tanerko (FR), bay stallion, 1953
Sire Tantieme (FR) 1947	Deux-Pour-Cent (FR); 1941	Deiri	Aethelstan
Sire Tantieme (FR) 1947	Deux-Pour-Cent (FR); 1941	Deiri	Desra
Sire Tantieme (FR) 1947	Deux-Pour-Cent (FR); 1941	Dix Pour Cent	Feridoon
Sire Tantieme (FR) 1947	Deux-Pour-Cent (FR); 1941	Dix Pour Cent	La Chansonnerie
Sire Tantieme (FR) 1947	Terka (FR); 1942	Indus	Alcantara
Sire Tantieme (FR) 1947	Terka (FR); 1942	Indus	Himalaya
Sire Tantieme (FR) 1947	Terka (FR); 1942	La Furka	Blandford
Sire Tantieme (FR) 1947	Terka (FR); 1942	La Furka	Branta
Dam La Divine (FR) 1943	Fair Copy (GB); 1934	Fairway	Phalaris
Dam La Divine (FR) 1943	Fair Copy (GB); 1934	Fairway	Scapa Flow
Dam La Divine (FR) 1943	Fair Copy (GB); 1934	Composure	Buchan
Dam La Divine (FR) 1943	Fair Copy (GB); 1934	Composure	Serenissima
Dam La Divine (FR) 1943	La Diva (FR); 1937	Blue Skies	Blandford
Dam La Divine (FR) 1943	La Diva (FR); 1937	Blue Skies	Blue Pill
Dam La Divine (FR) 1943	La Diva (FR); 1937	La Traviata	Alcantara
Dam La Divine (FR) 1943	La Diva (FR); 1937	La Traviata	Tregaron (Family:12)

- Tanerko was inbred 4 × 4 to Alcantara and Blandford, meaning that both of these stallion appear twice in the fourth generation of his pedigree.
