= Polemarch (horse) =

British-bred Thoroughbred racehorse

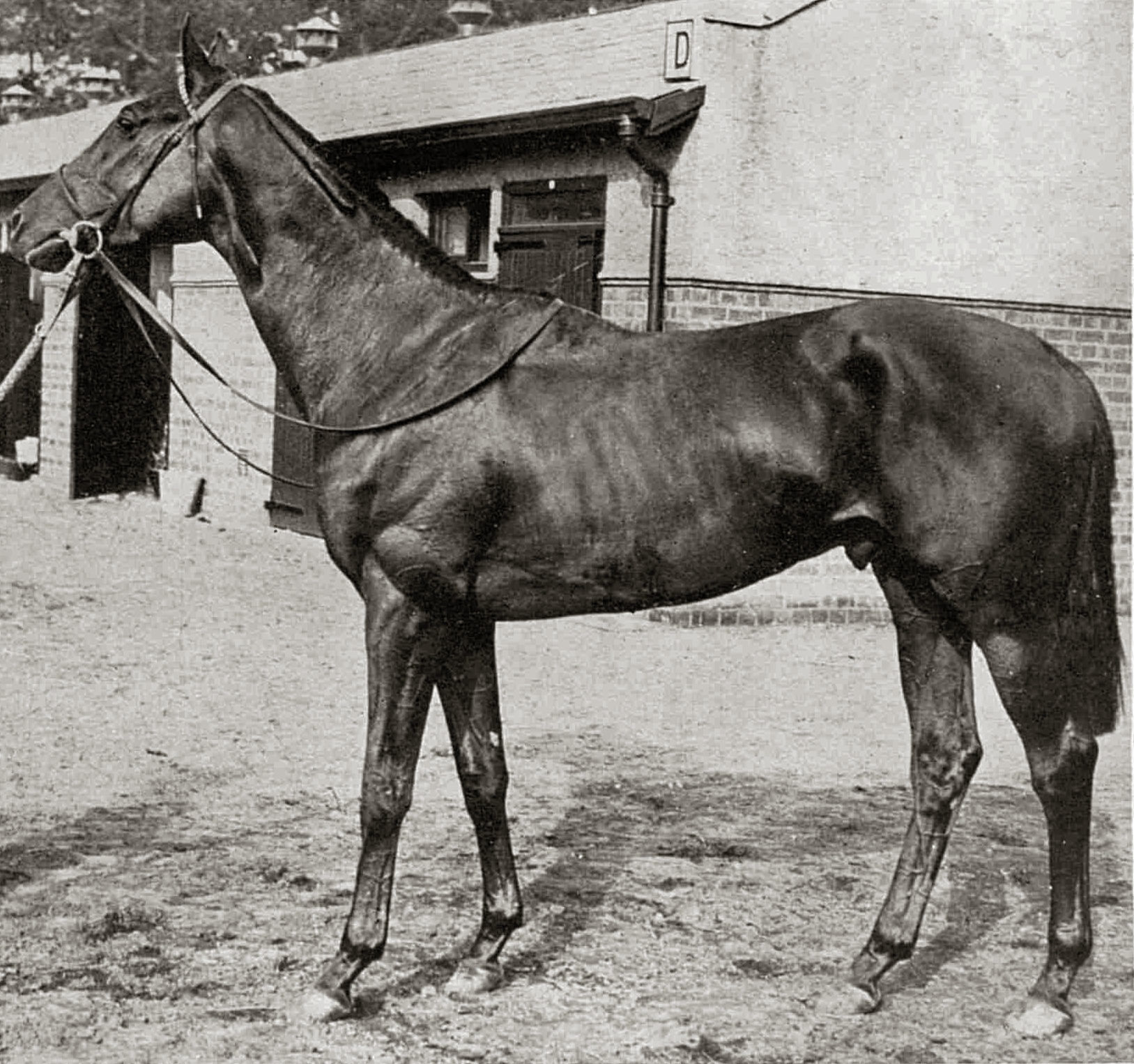
- Polemarch in 1921
- Sire: The Tetrarch
- Grandsire: Roi Herode
- Dam: Pomace
- Damsire: Polymelus
- Sex: Stallion
- Foaled: 1918
- Country: United Kingdom
- Colour: Chestnut
- Breeder: Charles Vane-Tempest-Stewart, 7th Marquess of Londonderry
- Owner: Lord Londonderry
- Trainer: R H Dewhurst; Tom Green
- Record: 16: 5-3-0

Major wins
- Gimcrack Stakes (1920); Rous Plate (1920); Knowsley Dinner Stakes (1921); Great Northern Leger (1921); St Leger (1921)

Polemarch (1918 – after 1937) was a British Thoroughbred racehorse and sire. He showed considerable promise as a two-year-old in 1920 when he won the Gimcrack Stakes and the Rous Plate as well as finishing third in the Middle Park Stakes. In the following year he won the Knowsley Dinner Stakes and the Great Northern Leger but appeared to have been exposed as some way short of top class before he recorded a 50/1 upset victory in the St Leger. In 1922 he became increasingly temperamental and difficult to manage and failed to win or place in five starts. He was then sold and exported to Argentina where he had considerable success of a breeding stallion.

== Background ==
Polemarch was a "leggy" chestnut horse with a white blaze bred and owned by Charles Vane-Tempest-Stewart, 7th Marquess of Londonderry. He was initially sent into training with Captain R H Dewhurst at his Bedford Lodge stable in Newmarket, Suffolk. Polemarch was an unusually late foal, being born on 3 June 1918.

He was sired by The Tetrarch an unbeaten horse who was regarded as one of the fastest two-year-old ever seen in Britain and Ireland, but whose career was ended by injury before he could race at three. The Tetrarch showed very little interest in his stud duties: his attitude towards sex was described as being "monastic in the extreme". Although he sired few foals his progeny included several major winners. Polemarch's dam Pomace, was a full-sister to the Middle Park Stakes winner Corcyra.

The colt's name, which was an ancient Greek military title, caused some confusion: although the correct pronunciation was polly-mark, bookmakers and the racing public called him pole-march.

== Racing career ==
=== 1920: two-year-old season ===
Polemarch ran five times as a two-year-old in 1920. He finished unplaced on his debut at Newmarket in July and first came to attention when finishing second in the Wynyard Plate at Stockton Racecourse in August, beaten ahead by the highly rated filly Barrulet. Later that month Polemarch contested the Gimcrack Stakes over six furlongs in which he was ridden by Fred Lane. Starting at odds of 5/1 he won by a neck from Lemonora with the filly Hasty Match in third. Although Lemonora looked an unlucky loser it was noted that Polemarch was likely to improve as he needed more time to "furnish and thicken" into his "ample frame". He then added a win in the Rous Plate at Doncaster Racecourse in September.

On his final appearance of the season on 15 October at Newmarket Racecourse Polemarch finished third behind Monarch and Humorist in the Middle Park Plate. As the owner of the Gimcrack winner, Lord Londonderry was invited to give the speech at the annual Gimcrack dinner in December in which he said that winning the St Leger was his "life's ambition".

=== 1921: three-year-old season ===
For the 1921 season, Polemarch was transferred to the training stable of Tom Green but his early form was disappointing. He finished down the field behind Lord Astor's Craig an Eran in the 2000 Guineas and did not contest the Derby which saw the ill-fated Humorist win from Craig an Eran and Lemonora. Polemarch was instead dropped in class but finished unplaced behind Long Suit in the Royal Standard Stakes at Manchester Racecourse. On 21 July he showed some signs of a return to form when he won the Knowsley Dinner Stakes over ten furlongs at Liverpool. In the following month Polemarch was stepped up in distance for the Great Northern Leger over thirteen furlongs at Stockton and won by a neck from the Irish colt Tremola. On his final start before the St Leger however, the colt was disappointing when beaten by Napolyon in a three-runner race at York.

On 7 September Polemarch, ridden by Joe Childs started a 50/1 outsider in a nine-runner field for the 146th running of the St Leger over fourteen and a half furlongs at Doncaster. Lord Londonderry was sceptical about his horse's chances, reportedly commenting that Polemarch could "only gallop for six furlongs". The overwhelming favourite for the race at odds of 1/4 was Craig an Eran, while the other runners included Tremola, Lord Glanely's Westward Ho (Great Yorkshire Stakes), Thunderer and Lord Carnarvon's Franklin (Hardwicke Stakes). Polemarch was restrained at the rear of the field as Franklin and Tremola et the pace and was not in the first three entering the straight. Franklin went to the front a furlong out but Polemarch produced a "brilliant finishing run" along the inside rail, took the lead in the closing stages and stayed on well to win "quite comfortably" by one and a half lengths from Franklin, with a gap of three lengths back to Westward Ho in third. Craig An Eran, who failed to stay, finished fourth with Tremola in fifth. Lord Londonderry was reportedly "dumbfounded" by the result.

=== 1922: four-year-old season ===
Polemarch remained in training as a four-year-old but made little impact having apparently "acquired an acute distaste for racing". He began his third season at Kempton Park Racecourse and ran unplaced in the Great Jubilee Handicap a race he contested despite his trainer's misgivings. In June he lined up for the Coronation Cup but refused to race and was left at the start. In the Ascot Gold Cup he seemed reluctant to make any real effort and finished unplaced behind Golden Myth. Another poor performance followed in the Manchester Cup when he finished last of the eight runners despite having led the field two furlongs out before dropping back very quickly. He took on Golden Myth again in the Eclipse Stakes at Sandown Park on 21 July but never looked likely to win and came home a distant fourth.

== Assessment and honours ==
In their book, A Century of Champions, based on the Timeform rating system, John Randall and Tony Morris rated Polemarch a "poor" winner of the St Leger.

== Stud record ==
On 1 August 1922 it was announced that Polemarch had been sold to stand as a breeding stallion and he was shipped to Buenos Aires in the following month. During the voyage he became "exceedingly savage", biting several crew members and passengers and causing "general havoc" aboard the ship.

Polemarch had considerable success in Argentina and sired the winners of six Argentinian classics:

- La Cloche (bay filly 1924). Won Gran Premio Seleccion (Argentine Oaks)
- Hechicero (chestnut colt, 1925). Won Gran Premio Polla de Potrillos (Argentinian 2,000 Guineas)
- Salmuera (chestnut filly, 1926). Won Gran Premio Polla de Potrancas (Argentinian 1,000 Guineas), Gran Premio Seleccion
- Fe Ciego (chestnut filly, 1929). Won Gran Premio Seleccion
- Vino Puro (chestnut colt, 1934). Won Gran Premio Polla de Potrillos

== Pedigree ==
Pedigree of Polemarch (GB), chestnut stallion, 1918
Sire The Tetrarch (IRE) 1911	Roi Herode (FR); 1904	Le Samaritain	Le Sancy
Sire The Tetrarch (IRE) 1911	Roi Herode (FR); 1904	Le Samaritain	Clementina (GB)
Sire The Tetrarch (IRE) 1911	Roi Herode (FR); 1904	Roxelane	War Dance
Sire The Tetrarch (IRE) 1911	Roi Herode (FR); 1904	Roxelane	Rose of York (GB)
Sire The Tetrarch (IRE) 1911	Vahren (GB); 1897	Bona Vista*	Bend Or
Sire The Tetrarch (IRE) 1911	Vahren (GB); 1897	Bona Vista*	Vista
Sire The Tetrarch (IRE) 1911	Vahren (GB); 1897	Castania	Hagioscope
Sire The Tetrarch (IRE) 1911	Vahren (GB); 1897	Castania	Rose Garden
Dam Pomace (GB) 1913	Polymelus (GB); 1902	Cyllene	Bona Vista*
Dam Pomace (GB) 1913	Polymelus (GB); 1902	Cyllene	Arcadia
Dam Pomace (GB) 1913	Polymelus (GB); 1902	Maid Marian	Hampton
Dam Pomace (GB) 1913	Polymelus (GB); 1902	Maid Marian	Quiver
Dam Pomace (GB) 1913	Pearmain (GB); 1905	Persimmon	St Simon
Dam Pomace (GB) 1913	Pearmain (GB); 1905	Persimmon	Perdita
Dam Pomace (GB) 1913	Pearmain (GB); 1905	Nenemoosha	Hagioscope
Dam Pomace (GB) 1913	Pearmain (GB); 1905	Nenemoosha	Wenonah (Family 6-f)

* Polemarch is inbred 3S x 4D to the stallion Bona Vista, meaning that he appears third generation on the sire side of his pedigree and fourth generation on the dam side of his pedigree.
