= Pascal Bary =

French racehorse trainer

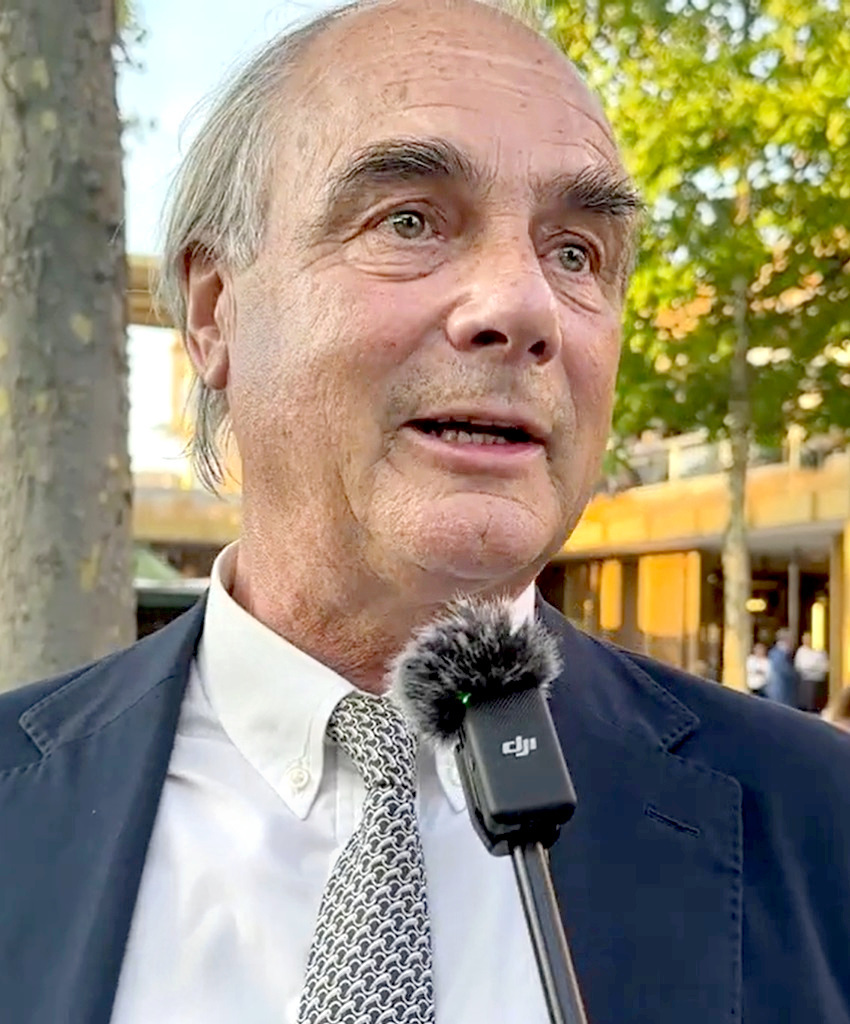
Pascal Bary in 2023

Pascal Bary (born 4 April 1953) is a French racehorse trainer.

He has been training since 1981, having previously worked as an assistant to François Boutin. He is based at Chantilly, Oise.

== Major wins ==
(Emirate of Dubai) Dubai

- Dubai World Cup - (1) - Glória de Campeão (2010)

France

- Grand Critérium - (1) - Way of Light (1998)
- Grand Prix de Paris - (2) - Zambezi Sun (2007), Feed The Flame (2023)
- Poule d'Essai des Pouliches - (2) - Bluemamba (2000), Divine Proportions (2005)
- Prix d'Astarté - (2) - Field of Hope (1999), Divine Proportions (2005)
- Prix de Diane - (2) - Divine Proportions (2005), Senga (2017)
- Prix de la Forêt - (1) - Field of Hope (1999)
- Prix d'Ispahan - (2) - Highest Honor (1987), Croco Rouge (1999)
- Prix Jacques Le Marois - (1) - Six Perfections (2003)
- Prix du Jockey Club - (6) - Celtic Arms (1994), Ragmar (1996), Dream Well (1998), Sulamani (2002), Blue Canari (2004), Study of Man (2018)
- Prix Lupin - (2) - Celtic Arms (1994), Croco Rouge (1998)
- Prix Marcel Boussac - (5) - Sierra Madre (1993), Amonita (2000), Six Perfections (2002), Denebola (2003), Divine Proportions (2004)
- Prix Morny - (2) - Deep Roots (1982), Divine Proportions (2004)
- Grand Prix de Saint-Cloud - (1) - Silverwave (2016)
- Prix Saint-Alary - (1) - Brilliance (1997)
- Prix de la Salamandre - (1) - Deep Roots (1982, dead-heat)
- Prix Vermeille - (1) - Sierra Madre (1994)

(United Kingdom) Great Britain

- 1,000 Guineas - (1) - Natagora (2008)
- Cheveley Park Stakes - (1) - Natagora (2007)

(Republic of Ireland) Ireland

- Irish Derby - (1) - Dream Well (1998)

Singapore

- Singapore Airlines International Cup - (1) - Glória de Campeão (2009)

United States

- Breeders' Cup Mile - (2) - Domedriver (2002), Six Perfections (2003)
- Breeders' Cup Turf - (1) - Miss Alleged (1991)
