= Prix Lupin =

- Class: Group 1
- Location: Longchamp Racecourse; Paris, France
- Inaugurated: 1855
- Final run: 16 May 2004
- Race type: Flat / Thoroughbred
- Website: france-galop.com

Race information
- Distance: 2,100 metres (1m 2½f)
- Surface: Turf
- Track: Right-handed
- Qualification: Three-year-olds excluding geldings
- Weight: 58 kg Allowances; 1½ kg for fillies
- Purse: €200,000 (2004); 1st: €114,280

The Prix Lupin was a Group 1 flat horse race in France open to three-year-old thoroughbred colts and fillies. It was run at Longchamp over a distance of 2,100 metres (about 1 mile and 2½ furlongs), and it was scheduled to take place each year in May.

== History ==
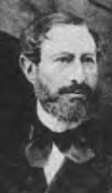
Auguste Lupin, the namesake of the race, in an 1854 photograph by Nadar

The event was established in 1855, and it was originally called the Prix de l'Empereur. It was initially held at the Champ de Mars, and was transferred to Longchamp in 1857. It was cancelled due to the Franco-Prussian War in 1871, and was renamed the Grande Poule des Produits in 1872.

The race was one of several trials for the Prix du Jockey Club collectively known as the Poules des Produits. The others (listed by their modern titles) were the Prix Daru, the Prix Hocquart, the Prix Noailles and the Prix Greffulhe. Unlike those races, the Grande Poule des Produits had no restrictions based on the nationality of a horse's sire or dam.

The event was renamed in memory of Auguste Lupin (1807–1895), a successful owner-breeder, in 1896.

The Prix Lupin was abandoned throughout World War I, with no running from 1915 to 1918. It was cancelled once during World War II, in 1940. It was run at Le Tremblay over 2,150 metres in 1943, and at Maisons-Laffitte in 1944.

The present system of race grading was introduced in 1971, and the Prix Lupin was classed at Group 1 level.

The race was last run in 2004. It was discontinued after France Galop restructured its Group 1 programme for three-year-olds in 2005.

== Records ==
Leading jockey (7 wins):

- George Stern – Saxon (1901), Ajax (1904), Genial (1905), Floraison (1912), Insensible (1919), Ksar (1921), Irismond (1924)

Leading trainer (7 wins):

- Tom Jennings – Mademoiselle de Chantilly (1857), Union Jack (1859), Le Mandarin (1865), Trocadero (1867), Braconnier (1876), Clementine (1878), Leon (1881)

Leading owner (7 wins):

- Frédéric de Lagrange – Mademoiselle de Chantilly (1857), Union Jack (1859), Le Mandarin (1865), Trocadero (1867), Braconnier (1876), Clementine (1878), Leon (1881)
- Edmond Blanc – Soukaras (1883), Gouverneur (1891), Gouvernail (1894), Saxon (1901), Caius (1903), Ajax (1904), Genial (1905)
- Édouard de Rothschild – Sans Souci (1907), Floraison (1912), Le Farina (1914), Bubbles (1928), Brantôme (1934), Aromate (1935), Bacchus (1939)
- Marcel Boussac – Irismond (1924), Tourbillon (1931), Ardan (1944), Djelal (1947), Ambiorix (1949), Dankaro (1974), Acamas (1978)

== Winners since 1960 ==
Year	Winner	Jockey	Trainer	Owner	Time
1960	Charlottesville	George Moore	Alec Head	HH Aga Khan IV	2:16.10
1961	Right Royal	Roger Poincelet	Etienne Pollet	Elisabeth Couturié	2:12.90
1962	Montfleur	A. P. Laborde	William Head	Mrs André Magnus	2:16.10
1963	Duc de Gueldre	Louis Heurteur	Geoffroy Watson	Thierry van Zuylen	2:13.20
1964	Le Fabuleux	Jean Massard	William Head	Mrs Guy Weisweiller	2:13.60
1965	Sea Bird	Pat Glennon	Etienne Pollet	Jean Ternynck	2:15.90
1966	Behistoun	Gérard Serpereau	Joseph Lieux	Alec Weisweiller	2:28.60
1967	Roi Dagobert	Jean Deforge	Etienne Pollet	Countess de la Valdène	2:14.00
1968	Luthier	Jean Deforge	Geoffroy Watson	Guy de Rothschild	2:14.20
1969	Prince Regent	Jean Deforge	Etienne Pollet	Countess de la Valdène	2:23.00
1970	Stintino	Gérard Thiboeuf	François Boutin	Gerry Oldham	2:16.20
1971	Tarbes	Y. Josse	Georges Bridgland	Mrs Georges Bridgland	2:15.50
1972	Hard to Beat	Lester Piggott	Richard Carver Jr.	S. Sokolov	2:20.60
1973	Kalamoun	Henri Samani	François Mathet	HH Aga Khan IV	2:14.40
1974	Dankaro	Gérard Rivases	Roger Poincelet	Marcel Boussac	2:10.20
1975	Green Dancer	Freddy Head	Alec Head	Jacques Wertheimer	2:15.70
1976	Youth	Freddy Head	Maurice Zilber	Nelson Bunker Hunt	2:13.60
1977	Pharly	Maurice Philipperon	John Cunnington Jr.	Antonio Blasco	2:18.70
1978	Acamas	Yves Saint-Martin	Guy Bonnaventure	Marcel Boussac	2:14.80
1979	Top Ville	Yves Saint-Martin	François Mathet	HH Aga Khan IV	2:09.30
1980	Belgio	Maurice Philipperon	John Cunnington Jr.	Henri Boccara	2:09.00
1981	No Lute	Pat Eddery	Robert Sangster	Robert Sangster	2:18.90
1982	Persepolis	Lester Piggott	François Boutin	Stavros Niarchos	2:09.80
1983	L'Emigrant	Cash Asmussen	François Boutin	Stavros Niarchos	2:19.30
1984	Dahar	Alain Lequeux	Maurice Zilber	Bruce McNall	2:13.20
1985	Metal Precieux	Alain Lequeux	Patrick Biancone	Daniel Wildenstein	2:12.70
1986	Fast Topaze	Cash Asmussen	Georges Mikhalidès	Mahmoud Fustok	2:10.10
1987	Groom Dancer	Dominique Boeuf	Tony Clout	Marvin Warner	2:12.00
1988	Exactly Sharp	Éric Legrix	Robert Collet	Jean-Pierre Binet	2:08.40
1989	Galetto	Éric Legrix	J. C. Cunnington	Countess Batthyany	2:10.90
1990	Epervier Bleu	Dominique Boeuf	Élie Lellouche	Daniel Wildenstein	2:10.00
1991	Cudas	Freddy Head	François Boutin	Allen Paulson	2:11.90
1992	Johann Quatz	Freddy Head	François Boutin	Stavros Niarchos	2:12.50
1993	Hernando	Cash Asmussen	François Boutin	Stavros Niarchos	2:10.30
1994	Celtic Arms	Gérald Mossé	Pascal Bary	Jean-Louis Bouchard	2:08.80
1995	Flemensfirth	Frankie Dettori	John Gosden	Sheikh Mohammed	2:17.20
1996	Helissio	Dominique Boeuf	Élie Lellouche	Enrique Sarasola	2:10.30
1997	Cloudings	Olivier Peslier	André Fabre	Sheikh Mohammed	2:18.20
1998	Croco Rouge	Sylvain Guillot	Pascal Bary	Wafic Saïd	2:10.30
1999	Gracioso	Olivier Peslier	André Fabre	Sheikh Mohammed	2:10.90
2000	Ciro	Michael Kinane	Aidan O'Brien	Tabor / Magnier / Santulli	2:13.50
2001	Chichicastenango	Alain Junk	Philippe Demercastel	Béatrice Brunet	2:10.50
2002	Act One	Thierry Gillet	Jonathan Pease	Gerald Leigh	2:09.50
2003	Dalakhani	Christophe Soumillon	Alain de Royer-Dupré	HH Aga Khan IV	2:09.40
2004	Voix du Nord	Dominique Boeuf	David Smaga	Thierry van Zuylen	2:08.50

== Earlier winners ==
- 1855: Baroncino
- 1856: Isolier
- 1857: Mademoiselle de Chantilly
- 1858: Gouvieux
- 1859: Union Jack
- 1860: Beauvais
- 1861: Finlande
- 1862: Choisy le Roi
- 1863: Dollar
- 1864: Bois Roussel
- 1865: Le Mandarin
- 1866:
- 1867: Trocadero
- 1868: Suzerain
- 1869: Cerdagne
- 1870: Sornette
- 1871: no race
- 1872: Little Agnes
- 1873: Franc Tireur
- 1874: Sabre
- 1875: Almanza
- 1876: Braconnier
- 1877: Jongleur
- 1878: Clementine
- 1879: Salteador
- 1880: Beauminet
- 1881: Leon
- 1882: Vigilant
- 1883: Soukaras
- 1884: Archiduc
- 1885: Xaintrailles
- 1886: Jupin
- 1887: Tenebreuse
- 1888: Stuart
- 1889: Cleodore
- 1890: Puchero
- 1891: Gouverneur
- 1892: Chene Royal
- 1893: Callistrate
- 1894: Gouvernail
- 1895: Le Sagittaire
- 1896: Champignol
- 1897: Palmiste
- 1898: Gardefeu
- 1899: Holocauste
- 1900: Ivry
- 1901: Saxon
- 1902: Kizil Kourgan
- 1903: Caius
- 1904: Ajax
- 1905: Genial
- 1906: Maintenon
- 1907: Sans Souci
- 1908: Holbein
- 1909: Oversight
- 1910: Coquille
- 1911: Alcantara
- 1912: Floraison
- 1913: Ecouen
- 1914: La Farina
- 1915–18: no race
- 1919: Insensible
- 1920: Battersea
- 1921: Ksar
- 1922: Joyeux Drille
- 1923: Massine
- 1924: Irismond
- 1925: Aquatinte
- 1926: Biribi
- 1927: Mon Talisman
- 1928: Bubbles
- 1929: Hotweed
- 1930: Xandover
- 1931: Tourbillon
- 1932: Shred
- 1933: Cappiello
- 1934: Brantôme
- 1935: Aromate
- 1936: Mieuxce
- 1937: Clairvoyant
- 1938: Castel Fusano
- 1939: Bacchus
- 1940: no race
- 1941: Le Pacha
- 1942: Tornado
- 1943: Pensbury
- 1944: Ardan
- 1945: Mistral
- 1946: Prince Chevalier
- 1947: Djelal
- 1948: Rigolo
- 1949: Ambiorix
- 1950: Tantieme
- 1951: Mat de Cocagne
- 1952: Vamos
- 1953: Dandy Drake
- 1954: Sica Boy
- 1955: Nistralin
- 1956: Tanerko
- 1957: Al Mabsoot
- 1958: Alegrador
- 1959: Midnight Sun

== See also ==
- List of French flat horse races
- Recurring sporting events established in 1855 – this race is included under its original title, Prix de l'Empereur.
