= Acamas (horse) =

British-bred Thoroughbred racehorse

- Sire: Mill Reef
- Grandsire: Never Bend
- Dam: Licata
- Damsire: Abdos
- Sex: Stallion
- Foaled: 2 May 1975
- Country: United Kingdom
- Colour: Bay
- Breeder: Marcel Boussac
- Owner: Marcel Boussac; Aga Khan IV
- Trainer: Guy Bonnaventure; François Mathet
- Record: 11:3-2-1

Major wins
- Prix Lupin (1978); Prix du Jockey Club (1978)

Awards
- Timeform rating 126 (1977), 130 (1978); Top-rated French three-year-old (1978)

Acamas (foaled 2 May 1975) was a British-bred French-trained Thoroughbred racehorse and sire. The last notable horse owned by the French breeder Marcel Boussac he showed promise as a two-year-old in 1977 when he finished a close third in the Grand Critérium. He reached his peak in the following year when he won the Prix Lupin and the Prix du Jockey Club, coming from an apparently impossible position in the latter race. He then finished second in the King George VI and Queen Elizabeth Stakes in England, but was later disqualified after failing a dope test. At the end of his three-year-old season he was retired to stud but proved largely infertile.

== Background ==
Acamas was a strong, deep-bodied bay horse with a white coronet on his left hind foot bred in the United Kingdom by Marcel Boussac. He was one of many successful racehorses sired by Mill Reef, an American-bred horse who won the Epsom Derby, King George VI and Queen Elizabeth Stakes and Prix de l'Arc de Triomphe in 1971. His dam Licata, was a very good racemare who won the Prix Cléopâtre and Prix de Malleret in 1972. She was even better as a broodmare, going on to produce the Grand Prix de Saint-Cloud winner Akarad and the 1982 Prix de l'Arc de Triomphe winner Akiyda. Boussac sent his colt into training with Guy Bonnaventure.

== Racing career ==
=== 1977: two-year-old season ===
Acamas won over 1100 metres on his debut and was then moved up sharply in class for the Group One Prix Robert Papin over the same distance at Évry Racecourse on 1 August. He started 5/4 favourite but finished tenth of the fourteen runners behind Vific. After a two-month break, Acamas was moved up in distance for the Grand Critérium over 1600 metres at Longchamp Racecourse on 9 October. Starting a 28/1 outsider he produced his best performance of the year as he finished third, beaten three quarters of a length and a neck by Super Concorde and Pyjama Hunt.

=== 1978: three-year-old season ===
Acamas made his three-year-old debut in the Prix Greffulhe over 2100 metres at Longchamp on 9 April. He started the 3.75/1 second favourite and finished second, half a length behind the winner Naasiri in a rough and unsatisfactory race. Yves Saint-Martin took over the ride on Acamas when the colt contested the Group One Prix Lupin over the same course and distance on 14 May. He started at odds of 4.6/1 against a field which included Nishapour, Rusticaro and Pyjama Hunt, who had filled the first three places in the Poule d'Essai des Pouliches as well as the previously undefeated Gay Mecene. Restrained at the back of the field until the turn into the straight, Acamas made rapid progress on the inside rail before taking the lead in the closing stages and winning by a length from Pyjama Hunt. On 4 June, Acamas started the 6/4 favourite for the Prix du Jockey Club over 2400 metres at Chantilly Racecourse. Racing towards the rear of the twenty-runner field, Acamas appeared to have lost any chance of winning when he was badly hampered and carried wide on the final turn, losing at least fifteen lengths in the process. Saint-Martin considered pulling the colt up but persevered, and began to make rapid progress on the wide outside. In the closing stages, Acamas overtook the entire field, taking the lead in the last stride and winning by a nose from Frere Basile. Timeform called the race "one of the most dramatic of recent classic races". By winning the race he became the last major winner for Boussac, who had been experiencing financial difficulties for several years.

In the following month, Acamas was matched against older horses for the first time when he was sent to England to contest the King George VI and Queen Elizabeth Stakes over one and a half miles at Ascot Racecourse. Starting favourite, he produced a strong run on the outside in the straight, but after veering to the left and then to the right, he was beaten one and a half lengths by the locally trained Ile de Bourbon. Acamas was later disqualified after a post-race urine test revealed traces of salicylic acid, a prohibited substance. Following his run at Ascot, Acamas was bought by the Aga Khan and transferred to the stable of the veteran François Mathet. On his only subsequent appearance as a three-year-old, Acamas started second favourite for the Prix de l'Arc de Triomphe at Longchamp in October but finished twelfth of the eighteen runners behind Alleged.

== Assessment ==
In 1977, the independent Timeform organisation gave Acamas a rating of 126, four pounds behind their top-rated two-year-old Try My Best. In the French Free Handicap, a ranking of the best two-year-olds to compete in France, Acamas was rated second, level with Pyjama Hunt and two pounds behind Super Concorde. In the following year, Acamas described as "unquestionably the best French three-year-old", rating him on 130, three pounds below Ile de Bourbon. In the official International Classification he was also rated three pounds behind Ile de Bourbon, making him the second best three-year-old in Europe, and the third-best horse of any age.

== Stud record ==
In August 1978 a half-share in the colt was sold to the Irish breeder Tim Rogers and he began his stud career at the Ballymany Stud, County Kildare in 1979. He had serious fertility problems and sired very few foals. He was returned to racing as an eight-year-old in 1983, but failed to recover his old form finishing last in the Prix Foy and twenty-fourth of the twenty-six runners in the Prix de l'Arc de Triomphe.

== Pedigree ==
Pedigree of Acamas (GB), bay stallion, 1975
Sire Mill Reef (USA) 1968	Never Bend (USA); 1960	Nasrullah	Nearco
Sire Mill Reef (USA) 1968	Never Bend (USA); 1960	Nasrullah	Mumtaz Begum
Sire Mill Reef (USA) 1968	Never Bend (USA); 1960	Lalun	Djeddah
Sire Mill Reef (USA) 1968	Never Bend (USA); 1960	Lalun	Be Faithful
Sire Mill Reef (USA) 1968	Milan Mill (USA); 1962	Princequillo	Prince Rose
Sire Mill Reef (USA) 1968	Milan Mill (USA); 1962	Princequillo	Cosquilla
Sire Mill Reef (USA) 1968	Milan Mill (USA); 1962	Virginia Water	Count Fleet
Sire Mill Reef (USA) 1968	Milan Mill (USA); 1962	Virginia Water	Red Ray
Dam Licata (FR) 1969	Abdos (FR); 1959	Arbar	'Djebel
Dam Licata (FR) 1969	Abdos (FR); 1959	Arbar	Astronomie
Dam Licata (FR) 1969	Abdos (FR); 1959	Pretty Lady	Umidwar
Dam Licata (FR) 1969	Abdos (FR); 1959	Pretty Lady	La Moqueuse
Dam Licata (FR) 1969	Gaia (FR); 1962	Shantung	Sicambre
Dam Licata (FR) 1969	Gaia (FR); 1962	Shantung	Barley Corn
Dam Licata (FR) 1969	Gaia (FR); 1962	Gloriana	Pharis
Dam Licata (FR) 1969	Gaia (FR); 1962	Gloriana	Tourzima (Family: 13-c)
