= Las Meninas (horse) =

Irish-bred Thoroughbred racehorse

- Sire: Glenstal
- Grandsire: Northern Dancer
- Dam: Spanish Habit
- Damsire: Habitat
- Sex: Mare
- Foaled: 1 April 1991
- Country: Ireland
- Colour: Bay
- Breeder: Swettenham Stud
- Owner: Robert Sangster
- Trainer: Tommy Stack
- Record: 8: 2-2-0
- Earnings: £180,855

Major wins
- Silver Flash Stakes (1993); 1000 Guineas (1994)

Las Meninas (foaled 22 April 1991) was an Irish Thoroughbred racehorse and broodmare. In a racing career which lasted from June 1993 to November 1994 she ran eight times and won two races. As a two-year-old she won on her debut and finished second in the Phoenix Stakes at Leopardstown. On her three-year-old debut, Las Meninas defeated Balanchine to win the Classic 1000 Guineas at Newmarket Racecourse becoming the first Irish winner since 1975. She went on to finish second in the Irish 1,000 Guineas at the Curragh but her subsequent form deteriorated and she finished unplaced in her remaining four races. Las Meninas was retired from racing to become a broodmare at the end of her three-year-old season.

== Background ==
Las Meninas was a bay filly bred in Ireland by her owner, Robert Sangster's Swettenham Stud. She was sired by Glenstal, a son of Northern Dancer who won the National Stakes in 1982 and the Prix Daphnis a year later. Apart from Las Meninas, his best winners included the Premio Parioli winner Candy Glen, and Glen Kate, a mare who won the Hong Kong International Bowl. Las Meninas, who was named after the painting by Velasquez, was sent into training with the former National Hunt jockey Tommy Stack at Golden, County Tipperary. The filly's one eccentricity was her tendency to swish her tail when walking, sometimes regarded as a sign of an unreliable temperament.

== Racing career ==
Las Meninas made her first appearance in the six furlong Silver Flash Stakes at Leopardstown in June. Ridden by Stephen Craine, she started at odds of 8/1 and won by a length from Danish. After a break of two months, Las Meninas reappeared in the Group One Phoenix Stakes over the same course and distance, in which she was tested against colts including the Norfolk Stakes winner Turtle Island. Ridden by Craine again, Las Meninas was hampered in the early stages but made progress to challenge for the lead in the final furlong, before finishing second to Turtle Island by half a length.

When Las Meninas returned in the 1000 Guineas over Newmarket's Rowley Mile course on 28 April 1994 she had been off the course for more than eight months. Stack had struggled to bring the filly to peak fitness because of the unusually wet and cold weather. She started at odds of 12/1 in a field of fifteen fillies in which the main contenders appeared to be the Nell Gwyn Stakes winner Mehthaaf who started favourite, Prophecy, the winner of the previous year's Cheveley Park Stakes and the French-trained Coup de Genie. Among the outsiders was Balanchine, a filly who had been sold by Robert Sangster to Sheikh Mohammed and sent to join the still-experimental Godolphin team in Dubai. Ridden for the first time by John Reid, Las Meninas was restrained in the early stages and appeared unlikely to find a clear run before finding a gap and moving up to challenge the leaders entering the final furlong. The closing stages saw a closely contested race between Las Meninas, Balanchine and Coup de Genie and following a photo-finish (which took the judge twenty minutes to resolve) the Irish filly was declared the winner by a short-head and a neck. After the race, Stack compared the emotional impact of the win to his success on Red Rum in the 1977 Grand National.

Three and a half weeks after her Newmarket win, Las Meninas started favourite for the Irish 1,000 Guineas on softer ground at the Curragh. She went into second place inside the final quarter mile but could no further progress and was beaten one and a half lengths by Mehthaaf. In June Las Meninas started favourite for the Coronation Stakes at Royal Ascot but finished fifth of the ten runners.

After a break of three and a half months, Las Meninas returned in the autumn, but failed to recapture her earlier form. At Longchamp in October she was unplaced in the Prix du Rond Point and the Prix de la Forêt. She was then sent to California in November where she finished last of the eight runners behind Exchange in the Matriarch Stakes at Hollywood Park Racetrack. Las Meninas was then retired from racing.

== Assessment ==
In their book, A Century of Champions, based on the Timeform rating system, John Randall and Tony Morris rated Las Meninas a "poor" winner of the 1000 Guineas.

== Stud record ==
At stud, Las Meninas was sent to leading stallions including Thunder Gulch, Woodman and Royal Academy. She was later sent to Japan where she produced six foals, two by Sunday Silence, at the Shadai Farm before being retired in 2006. She produced some minor winners, but nothing of top class.

== Pedigree ==
Pedigree of Las Meninas (IRE), bay mare, 1991
Sire Glenstal (USA) 1980	Northern Dancer; 1961	Nearctic	Nearco
Sire Glenstal (USA) 1980	Northern Dancer; 1961	Nearctic	Lady Angela
Sire Glenstal (USA) 1980	Northern Dancer; 1961	Natalma	Native Dancer
Sire Glenstal (USA) 1980	Northern Dancer; 1961	Natalma	Almahmoud
Sire Glenstal (USA) 1980	Cloonlara; 1974	Sir Ivor	Sir Gaylord
Sire Glenstal (USA) 1980	Cloonlara; 1974	Sir Ivor	Attica
Sire Glenstal (USA) 1980	Cloonlara; 1974	Fish-Bar	Baldric
Sire Glenstal (USA) 1980	Cloonlara; 1974	Fish-Bar	Fisherman's Wharf
Dam Spanish Habit (GB) 1979	Habitat; 1966	Sir Gaylord	Turn-To
Dam Spanish Habit (GB) 1979	Habitat; 1966	Sir Gaylord	Somethingroyal
Dam Spanish Habit (GB) 1979	Habitat; 1966	Little Hut	Occupy
Dam Spanish Habit (GB) 1979	Habitat; 1966	Little Hut	Savage Beauty
Dam Spanish Habit (GB) 1979	Donna Cressida; 1972	Don	Grey Sovereign
Dam Spanish Habit (GB) 1979	Donna Cressida; 1972	Don	Diviana
Dam Spanish Habit (GB) 1979	Donna Cressida; 1972	Cresca	Saint Crespin
Dam Spanish Habit (GB) 1979	Donna Cressida; 1972	Cresca	Djidda (Family: 1-t)
