= Talma (horse) =

French-bred Thoroughbred racehorse

- Sire: Pharis
- Grandsire: Pharos
- Dam: Thaouka
- Damsire: Asterus
- Sex: Stallion
- Foaled: 1948
- Country: France
- Colour: Bay
- Breeder: Marcel Boussac
- Owner: Marcel Boussac
- Trainer: Charles Semblat
- Record: 9: 5-1-1

Major wins
- Prix Franc Tireur (1951); Prix Berteux (1951); St Leger Stakes (1951); Cumberland Lodge Stakes (1951); Prix Flying Dutchman (1953)

Awards
- Timeform rating 130 (1951)

Talma, also known as Talma II, (1948 – after 1969) was a French Thoroughbred racehorse and sire best known for winning the classic St Leger Stakes. After winning his first two races in France he started second favourite for the St Leger and won by a margin conservatively recorded as ten lengths despite misbehaving before the race. He recorded his only other win of any consequence when he took the Cumberland Lodge Stakes. He raced until the age of five and was then exported to South America where he had moderate success as a breeding stallion.

== Background ==
Talma was a chestnut horse with four white socks bred by in France his owner Marcel Boussac. He was sired by Pharis, the undefeated winner of the 1939 Prix du Jockey Club and Grand Prix de Paris. Talma's dam Thaouka, also bred by Boussac was a successful racemare who won the Grand Prix de Vichy-Auvergne in 1932. Before Talma, Thaouka had produced several winners including Canzoni (Prix Penelope, Prix Chloé) and Micipsa (Prix Eugène Adam, Prix du Prince d'Orange). As a son of Pharis out of an Asterus mare who was in turn out of a mare by Gainsborough, Talma was bred on very similar lines to Boussac's 1950 St Leger winner Scratch. Talma was sent into training with Charles Semblat at Chantilly.

== Racing career ==
Talma was unraced as a two-year-old. On his racecourse debut in 1951 he won the Prix Franc Tireur at Le Tremblay and then took the Prix Berteux at Longchamp Racecourse.

In autumn, Talma was sent to England to contest the 175th running of the St Leger on 15 September at Doncaster Racecourse in which he was ridden by the Australian jockey Rae Johnstone. After considerable late support in the betting market he started at odds of 7/1 second favourite in a field of sixteen colts and two fillies. The favourite was Sybil's Nephew, who had finished second to Arctic Prince in the Epsom Derby, whilst the other contenders included the Irish Derby winner Fraise du Bois and the Yorkshire Oaks winner Sea Parrot. In the paddock before the race, Talma sweated badly and appeared to become sexually excited: it was noted that "his mind seemed to on anything but racing". In the race however, he took the lead six furlongs from the finish and was never in the slightest danger of defeat, drawing away in the straight to win very easily from Fraise du Bois and Medway. The official winning margin was ten lengths but looked to be nearer to twenty.

Talma returned to England in October and won again but was much less impressive. He started 1/5 favourite for the inaugural running of the Cumberland Lodge Stakes but was hard pressed by Eastern Emperor and the winning margin on this occasion was only a neck.

Talma remained in training for two more seasons and was campaigned in staying races but never recaptured the form he had shown at Doncaster. In 1952 he ran three times, finishing second in the Prix du Cadran, third in the Ascot Gold Cup and fourth in the Doncaster Cup. On his seasonal debut in 1953 he won the Prix Flying Dutchman over 2600 metres but then finished unplaced in the Ascot Gold Cup.

== Assessment ==
The independent Timeform organisation gave Talma a rating of 130 in 1951, making him five pounds inferior to their top-rated three-year-olds Arctic Prince, Sicambre and Supreme Court. In their book A Century of Champions, based on a modified version of the Timeform system, John Randall and Tony Morris rated Talma an "inferior" winner of the St Leger.

== Stud record ==
At the end of his racing career Talma was exported to South America where he stood as a breeding stallion in Argentina and Peru.

== Pedigree ==
Pedigree of Talma (FR), chestnut stallion 1948
Sire Pharis (FR) 1936	Pharos (GB); 1920	Phalaris	Polymelus
Sire Pharis (FR) 1936	Pharos (GB); 1920	Phalaris	Bromus
Sire Pharis (FR) 1936	Pharos (GB); 1920	Scapa Flow	Chaucer
Sire Pharis (FR) 1936	Pharos (GB); 1920	Scapa Flow	Anchora
Sire Pharis (FR) 1936	Carissima (FR); 1923	Clarissimus	Radium
Sire Pharis (FR) 1936	Carissima (FR); 1923	Clarissimus	Quintessence
Sire Pharis (FR) 1936	Carissima (FR); 1923	Casquetts	Captivation
Sire Pharis (FR) 1936	Carissima (FR); 1923	Casquetts	Cassis
Dam Thaouka (FR) 1929	Asterus (FR); 1923	Teddy	Ajax
Dam Thaouka (FR) 1929	Asterus (FR); 1923	Teddy	Rondeau
Dam Thaouka (FR) 1929	Asterus (FR); 1923	Astrella	Verdun
Dam Thaouka (FR) 1929	Asterus (FR); 1923	Astrella	Saint Astra
Dam Thaouka (FR) 1929	Sweet Picture (GB); 1922	Gainsborough	Bayardo
Dam Thaouka (FR) 1929	Sweet Picture (GB); 1922	Gainsborough	Rosedrop
Dam Thaouka (FR) 1929	Sweet Picture (GB); 1922	Seamab	John o' Gaunt
Dam Thaouka (FR) 1929	Sweet Picture (GB); 1922	Seamab	Sweet Marjorie (Family: 4-n)
