= Cloonlara (horse) =

American-bred Thoroughbred racehorse (1974–1981)

- Sire: Sir Ivor
- Grandsire: Sir Gaylord
- Dam: Fish Bar
- Damsire: Baldric
- Sex: Mare
- Foaled: 28 April 1974
- Country: United States
- Colour: Bay
- Breeder: Lyonstown Stud
- Owner: John Mulcahy
- Trainer: Vincent O'Brien
- Record: 6:3-0-0

Major wins
- Hurry On Stakes (1976); Probationers Stakes (1976); Phoenix Stakes (1976)

Awards
- Top-rated Irish two-year-old (1976); Timeform best two-year-old filly (1976); Timeform rating: 130 (1976), 117 (1977)
- Last updated on 22 October 2023

Cloonlara (28 April 1974 – 23 August 1981) was an American-bred, Irish-trained Thoroughbred racehorse and broodmare. Although she never contested a Group One race as a two-year-old, Cloonlara was regarded as the best juvenile filly to race in Europe in 1976. The daughter of Derby winner Sir Ivor won all three of her races that year by wide margins, culminating in a six length win over colts in the Phoenix Stakes. She missed the rest of the season through injury and failed to reproduce her best form in 1977, when she became increasingly temperamental. Cloonlara made a highly promising start to her breeding career before her death from a lightning strike at the age of seven in August 1981.

== Background ==
Cloonlara was a bay filly bred in Kentucky by the Irish-based Lyonstown Stud. She was sired by Sir Ivor, an American-bred colt whose wins included the Derby and Washington, D.C. International in 1968. At stud he was best known as an exceptional sire of broodmares but also sired many good winners over a wide variety of distances and surfaces with his progeny including Ivanjica, Bates Motel, Sir Tristram and French Holly. Cloonlara's dam Fish Bar produced several other winners including the leading miler Kings Lake. Fish Bar was a granddaughter of the 1000 Guineas and St Leger Stakes winner Herringbone, whose other descendants included Moon Madness, Celtic Swing and Michelozzo. Racing in the colours of John Mulcahy, Cloonlara was sent to race in Ireland, where she was trained by Vincent O'Brien at Ballydoyle. She was named after a village in County Clare.

== Racing career ==
=== 1976: two-year-old season ===
On her racecourse debut Cloonlara contested the Hurry-On Stakes over five furlongs at Phoenix Park Racecourse and won by five lengths from Success At Last and seven others. Only two horses appeared to oppose the filly when she was moved up in distance for the Probationers Stakes over six and a half furlongs at the Curragh Racecourse. Starting at odds of 1/10 she won by five lengths, emulating her sire, Sir Ivor, who won the same race in 1967. Cloonlara was then dropped back in distance, and moved up in class for the Group Two Phoenix Stakes over five furlongs on firm ground at Phoenix Park. She was made second favourite behind the colt Godswalk who had won the Norfolk Stakes at Royal Ascot by four lengths. Cloonlara broke quickly, established a clear advantage, and was never seriously challenged, winning by six lengths from Godswalk with Ring Leader (who had won his previous race by ten lengths) in third place. The filly sustained an injury in the race and finished lame. Despite hopes that she might return for the Cheveley Park Stakes she did not race again in 1976.

=== 1977: three-year-old season ===
On her debut as a three-year-old in April 1977, Cloonlara was sent to England for the 1000 Guineas Trial at Ascot Racecourse where the ground was so soft that the starting stalls could not be used and the race was started by flag. When the flag fell for the first time, Cloonlara, ridden by Lester Piggott, started well, but the runners were recalled after a false start was declared. On the second start, Cloonlara was standing side-on as the flag fell, lost approximately twenty yards and never recovered, finishing unplaced behind the French filly Sanedtki. The race reportedly provoked a "sharp exchange" between Piggott and the starter Dick Smalley. Despite her unfortunate experience at Ascot, Cloonlara was made 6/4 favourite for the 165th running of the 1000 Guineas over the Rowley Mile course at Newmarket Racecourse. She took the lead from the start but was strongly challenged by the 16/1 outsider Mrs McArdy two furlongs from the finish. When Piggott resorted to the whip, the filly's only response was to swish her tail in a "querulous" manner, and she finished the race in fourth place behind Mrs McArdy, Freeze The Secret and Sanedtki.

Attempts to return the filly to sprint distances in the Cork and Orrery Stakes at Royal Ascot in June proved unsuccessful as she threw Piggott off in the preliminaries and then refused to enter the starting stalls. In the Prix de la Porte Maillot over 1400 metres at Longchamp Racecourse later that month, she was more co-operative, consenting to start the race without giving any trouble. Starting at odds of 11/1 she appeared to have every chance in the straight but finished fourth of the eleven runners, two and three-quarter lengths behind the winner Polyponder.

== Assessment ==
There was no International Classification of European two-year-olds in 1976: the official handicappers of Britain, Ireland and France compiled separate rankings for horses which competed in those countries. In the Irish Free Handicap Cloonlara was rated the best two-year-old of either sex, seven pounds superior to Godswalk, ten ahead of The Minstrel and thirteen ahead of Nebbiolo. The independent Timeform organisation gave her a rating of 130, making her the best two-year-old filly of the season, one pound behind their best two-year-old colt Blushing Groom and level with their highest-rated British juvenile J O Tobin. The veteran Irish trainer Paddy Prendergast regarded her as the best filly seen in Ireland for more than thirty years. In 1977, Cloonlara was given a rating of 117 by Timeform, sixteen pounds below their top-rated three-year-old filly Dunfermline. In the inaugural International Classification for three-year-olds she was given a rating of 80, ten pounds below the top fillies Dunfermline and Madelia.

In their book A Century of Champions, based on a modified version of the Timeform system, John Randall and Tony Morris rated Cloonlara the twenty-first best British or Irish-trained two-year-old filly of the 20th century.

== Breeding record ==
Cloonlara was retired from racing to become a broodmare. She produced only three foals, all of whom won races:

- Chivalry (bay colt, foaled in 1979, sired by Nijinsky), won one race in Ireland and one race in the United States
- Glenstal (bay colt, 1980, by Northern Dancer), won three of his five races including the National Stakes and the Prix Daphnis and sired the 1000 Guineas winner Las Meninas.
- Atlantic Salmon (brown gelding, 1981, by Lyphard), won two races in Ireland

Cloonlara was in foal to Northern Dancer, when she was killed by lightning in 1981.

== Pedigree ==
Pedigree of Cloonlara (IRE), bay mare, 1974
Sire Sir Ivor (USA) 1965	Sir Gaylord (USA); 1959	Turn-To	Royal Charger
Sire Sir Ivor (USA) 1965	Sir Gaylord (USA); 1959	Turn-To	Source Sucree
Sire Sir Ivor (USA) 1965	Sir Gaylord (USA); 1959	Somethingroyal	Princequillo
Sire Sir Ivor (USA) 1965	Sir Gaylord (USA); 1959	Somethingroyal	Imperatrice
Sire Sir Ivor (USA) 1965	Attica (USA); 1953	Mr.Trouble	Mahmoud
Sire Sir Ivor (USA) 1965	Attica (USA); 1953	Mr.Trouble	Motto
Sire Sir Ivor (USA) 1965	Attica (USA); 1953	Athenia	Pharamond
Sire Sir Ivor (USA) 1965	Attica (USA); 1953	Athenia	Salaminia
Dam Fish Bar (IRE) 1967	Baldric (USA); 1961	Round Table	Princequillo
Dam Fish Bar (IRE) 1967	Baldric (USA); 1961	Round Table	Knight's Daughter
Dam Fish Bar (IRE) 1967	Baldric (USA); 1961	Two Cities	Johnstown
Dam Fish Bar (IRE) 1967	Baldric (USA); 1961	Two Cities	Vienna
Dam Fish Bar (IRE) 1967	Fisherman's Wharf (IRE); 1959	Alycidon	Donatello
Dam Fish Bar (IRE) 1967	Fisherman's Wharf (IRE); 1959	Alycidon	Aurora
Dam Fish Bar (IRE) 1967	Fisherman's Wharf (IRE); 1959	Herringbone	King Salmon
Dam Fish Bar (IRE) 1967	Fisherman's Wharf (IRE); 1959	Herringbone	Schiaparelli (Family:8-c)
