= Lavandin (horse) =

French-bred Thoroughbred racehorse

- Sire: Verso
- Grandsire: Pinceau
- Dam: Lavande
- Damsire: Rustom Pasha
- Sex: Stallion
- Foaled: 1953
- Country: France
- Colour: Bay
- Breeder: Pierre Wertheimer
- Owner: Pierre Wertheimer
- Trainer: Alec Head
- Record: 5: 2-1-1
- Earnings: £

Major wins
- Epsom Derby (1956)

Lavandin (1953–1978) was a French Thoroughbred racehorse and sire. In a brief career which lasted from November 1955 to June 1956, Lavandin ran five times, winning twice. He is best known for his win in the 1956 Epsom Derby.

== Background ==
Lavandin was bred in France by his owner, the “perfume king” Pierre Wertheimer. His sire, Verso (also known as Verso II), was the outstanding French colt of his generation, winning the Prix du Jockey Club and the Prix de l'Arc de Triomphe in 1943. Lavandin’s dam, Lavande won three races and produced the top class sprinter Le Lavandou, but was later barren for four successive years. Wertheimer had decided to have the mare put down, but was persuaded by Verso’s owner, the Comte de Chambure to have her covered by his stallion in 1949. Lavandin was the result. Lavandin was sent into training with Alec Head at Chantilly.

== Racing career ==
=== 1955: two-year-old season ===
Lavandin did not appear on the racecourse until late autumn. He ran in a minor race at Maisons-Laffitte in November and finished second.

=== 1956: three-year-old season ===
On his three-year-old debut, Lavandin was sent to Longchamp in April for the Prix de Boulogne over 1900m and recorded his first win. He was then moved up in class for the Prix Hocquart over 2000m. He finished third, but appeared to be an unlucky loser, with his jockey Roger Poincelet being blamed for his defeat.

Lavandin was sent to England for the Derby at Epsom, with the Australian Rae Johnstone taking over as his rider. The colt became Wertheimer’s first runner in the race after more than forty years of involvement in the sport. Despite driving rain, the race attracted an estimated crowd of 250,000, including the Queen Mother. In an open betting race, Lavandin started favourite at 7/1 in a field of twenty-seven. Having been held up in the early stages, Lavandin passed the long time leader Monterey a furlong from the finish and held off the strong- finishing Montaval to win by a neck. The fact that the first two horses were trained in France, following on from the victory of Phil Drake in the previous year, led some commentators to state that British racing had “hit rock bottom.”

On his final start, Lavandin was injured when running unplaced behind Vattel in the Grand Prix de Paris.

== Assessment ==
In their book A Century of Champions, John Randall and Tony Morris rated Lavandin a “poor” Derby winner.

== Stud career ==
Lavandin retired to stud in France, where he stood as a stallion until being exported to Japan in 1963. The most notable of his European progeny was the filly Bla Bla who won the Prix de Diane in 1965.

== Pedigree ==
Pedigree of Lavandin (FR), bay stallion, 1953
Sire Verso (FR) 1940	Pinceau; 1925	Alcantara	Perth
Sire Verso (FR) 1940	Pinceau; 1925	Alcantara	Toison d’Or
Sire Verso (FR) 1940	Pinceau; 1925	Aquarelle	Childwick
Sire Verso (FR) 1940	Pinceau; 1925	Aquarelle	Temesvar
Sire Verso (FR) 1940	Variete; 1924	La Farina	Sans Souci
Sire Verso (FR) 1940	Variete; 1924	La Farina	Malatesta
Sire Verso (FR) 1940	Variete; 1924	Vaya	Beppo
Sire Verso (FR) 1940	Variete; 1924	Vaya	Waterhen
Dam Lavande (FR) 1936	Rustom Pasha; 1927	Son-In-Law	Dark Ronald
Dam Lavande (FR) 1936	Rustom Pasha; 1927	Son-In-Law	Mother In Law
Dam Lavande (FR) 1936	Rustom Pasha; 1927	Cos	Flying Orb
Dam Lavande (FR) 1936	Rustom Pasha; 1927	Cos	Renaissance
Dam Lavande (FR) 1936	Livadia; 1927	Epinard	Badajoz
Dam Lavande (FR) 1936	Livadia; 1927	Epinard	Epine Blanche
Dam Lavande (FR) 1936	Livadia; 1927	Lady Kroon	Kroonstad
Dam Lavande (FR) 1936	Livadia; 1927	Lady Kroon	Needle Rock (Family: 4-p)
