= Ardan (horse) =

French-bred Thoroughbred racehorse

- Sire: Pharis
- Grandsire: Pharos
- Dam: Adargatis
- Damsire: Asterus
- Sex: Stallion
- Foaled: 1941
- Country: France
- Colour: Bay
- Breeder: Haras de Fresnay-le-Buffard
- Owner: Marcel Boussac
- Trainer: Charles Semblat
- Record: 23: 16-3-2
- Earnings: F8,498,090 + £1,728

Major wins
- Prix Robert Papin (1943); Prix Lupin (1944); Prix Greffulhe (1944); Prix Hocquart (1944); Prix de Guiche (1944); Prix du Jockey Club (1944); Prix de l'Arc de Triomphe (1944); Grand Prix de Saint-Cloud (1945); Prix Boiard (1945); Prix d'Hédouville (1945, 1946); Prix Kergorlay (1945, 1946); Coronation Cup (1946)
- Last updated on 2 June 2009

Ardan (1941–1959) was a French Thoroughbred racehorse. In a racing career which lasted from 1943 until 1946 he ran twenty-three times and won sixteen races. He was the leading racehorse in France in 1944 when his wins included the Prix du Jockey Club and the Prix de l'Arc de Triomphe. He was retired to stud at the end of the 1946 season and had limited success as a stallion.

== Background ==
He was bred and owned by Marcel Boussac, the very prominent French horseman and owner of fashion house, House of Dior. He was sired by Boussac's stallion Pharis, a horse that Thoroughbred Heritage says is "considered one of the greatest French-bred runners of the century". Ardan's dam, Adargatis, was by Asterus who had been a six-time Leading Sire of Broodmares in France. Pardal (1947), who won the Jockey Club Stakes and five other good races was a full brother to Ardan.

Ardan was trained by Charles Semblat, a champion jockey who became one of the most successful horse trainers in French racing history and the last France-based trainer to ever win the British trainers' championship.

== Racing career ==
At age two, the colt won the 1943 Prix Robert Papin, one of France's important races for Two-Year-Olds. The following year, he was the dominant horse in the country. Under regular jockey Jacques Doyasbère he won seven major races in 1944, including the Grand Prix de Paris in which he was then disqualified and set back to third. The highlight of his campaign were wins in the Prix du Jockey Club at Chantilly Racecourse and the Prix de l'Arc de Triomphe held that year at Hippodrome du Tremblay.

In 1945, Ardan continued to win important races including the Grand Prix de Saint-Cloud and in the Prix de l'Arc de Triomphe, ran second to the great filly Nikellora. Raced in 1946 at age five, Ardan won his second consecutive Prix Kergorlay and at Epsom Downs in England, he won the Group One Coronation Cup. He also finished second in the Grand Prix de Saint-Cloud and in the only time he was ever unplaced in his career, finished fourth in that year's Prix de l'Arc de Triomphe.

== Stud career ==
Retired at the end of the 1946 racing season, Ardan stood at stud at Marcel Boussac's Haras de Fresnay-le-Buffard in Neuvy-au-Houlme in Orne. Three years later he was bought for $400,000 by Leslie Combs II and sent to one of America's preeminent breeding operations, Spendthrift Farm in Lexington, Kentucky. While Ardan's offspring won a number of Conditions / Stakes races, none achieved his level of success. One of his best horses was Hard Sauce who was a six furlong specialist and the sire of Hard Tack and Hard Ridden (Epsom Derby). Ardan suffered from heart problems and died at Spendthrift in 1959.
