= Hard Ridden =

Irish-bred Thoroughbred racehorse

- Sire: Hard Sauce
- Grandsire: Ardan
- Dam: Toute Belle
- Damsire: Admiral Drake
- Sex: Stallion
- Foaled: 1955
- Country: Ireland
- Colour: Bay
- Breeder: Oliver Lambart
- Owner: Victor Sassoon
- Trainer: Mick Rogers
- Record: 5: 2-2-1
- Earnings: £

Major wins
- Irish 2000 Guineas (1958); Epsom Derby (1958)

Hard Ridden (1955–1981) was an Irish Thoroughbred racehorse. In a brief career of five races, he won the Irish 2000 Guineas at the Curragh and the Derby at Epsom in 1958. He was retired from racing later in the same year and stood as a stallion in Ireland and Japan.

== Background ==
Hard Ridden was a “long and lean” bay horse bred in Ireland by Sir Oliver Lambart. His sire, Hard Sauce (1948– 1969) was a top-class racehorse, who excelled over sprint distances, winning the July Cup in 1951. Hard Ridden's dam, Toute Belle, was a French-bred mare from a staying family who failed as a racehorse and was covered by Hard Sauce after failing to attract a buyer when put up for auction at Newmarket in December 1953.

Hard Ridden was sent to the sales at Dublin as a yearling, and was bought for 270gns by Sir Victor Sassoon. The colt was sent into training with Mick Rogers at the Curragh.

== Racing career ==
=== 1957: two-year-old season ===
Hard Ridden finished second in his only race as a two-year-old in 1957.

=== 1958: three-year-old season ===
On his three-year-old debut, Hard Ridden ran second in a race at the Curragh. He was then returned to the same course for the Irish 2000 Guineas and won impressively by four lengths from the future Irish Derby winner, Sindon, with Paddy's Point third.

The favourite for the Derby, Alcide, was withdrawn from the race after being “got at” (deliberately injured) in his stable, leaving the race looking very open. Hard Ridden, however, as the son of a sprinter, was thought unlikely to be effective over one and a half miles and started at 18/1 in a field of twenty in front of a crowd estimated at 200,000 including the Queen. Ridden by the fifty-one-year-old Charlie Smirke, Hard Ridden was held up in the early stages as the leaders set a moderate pace. In the straight, Smirke sent Hard Ridden through a gap on the inside to take the lead and go clear. In the closing stages Hard Ridden extended his advantage to win by five lengths from Paddy's Point and Nagami, becoming the first Irish-trained winner of the race since Orby in 1907. Immediately after the race Smirke announced "That's it, I've ridden my last Derby!"

Hard Ridden did not appear again on the racecourse until late July, when he ran in the King George VI and Queen Elizabeth Stakes at Ascot. He finished unplaced behind Ballymoss and was shortly afterwards retired to stud.

== Assessment ==
In their book A Century of Champions, John Randall and Tony Morris rated "Hard Ridden" as an “inferior” Derby winner.

Timeform rated Hard Ridden on a mark of 131. A rating of 130 is considered the mark of an above average European Group One winner.

== Stud career ==
Hard Ridden stood as a stallion in Ireland until 1967 when he was exported to Japan. His progeny included Giolla Mear (Irish St. Leger) and Hardicanute (Champagne Stakes).

== Pedigree ==
Pedigree of Hard Ridden (Ire), bay stallion, 1955
Sire Hard Sauce (GB) 1948	Ardan; 1941	Pharis	Pharos
Sire Hard Sauce (GB) 1948	Ardan; 1941	Pharis	Carissima
Sire Hard Sauce (GB) 1948	Ardan; 1941	Adargatis	Asterus
Sire Hard Sauce (GB) 1948	Ardan; 1941	Adargatis	Helene de Troie
Sire Hard Sauce (GB) 1948	Saucy Bella; 1941	Bellacose	Sir Cosmo
Sire Hard Sauce (GB) 1948	Saucy Bella; 1941	Bellacose	Orbella
Sire Hard Sauce (GB) 1948	Saucy Bella; 1941	Marmite	Mr Jinks
Sire Hard Sauce (GB) 1948	Saucy Bella; 1941	Marmite	Gentlemen’s Relish
Dam Toute Belle (FR) 1947	Admiral Drake; 1931	Craig an Eran	Sunstar
Dam Toute Belle (FR) 1947	Admiral Drake; 1931	Craig an Eran	Maid of the Mist
Dam Toute Belle (FR) 1947	Admiral Drake; 1931	Plucky Liege	Spearmint
Dam Toute Belle (FR) 1947	Admiral Drake; 1931	Plucky Liege	Concertina
Dam Toute Belle (FR) 1947	Chatelaine; 1941	Casterari	Fiterari
Dam Toute Belle (FR) 1947	Chatelaine; 1941	Casterari	Castleline
Dam Toute Belle (FR) 1947	Chatelaine; 1941	Yssel	Kircubbin
Dam Toute Belle (FR) 1947	Chatelaine; 1941	Yssel	Yvonne (Family: 16)
