= Glenstal =

Glenstal may refer to:

- Glenstal Abbey, an Irish Benedictine monastery
- Glenstal Abbey School, an Irish boarding school for boys
- Glenstal (horse)
