= Rae Johnstone =

Australian jockey (1905–1964)

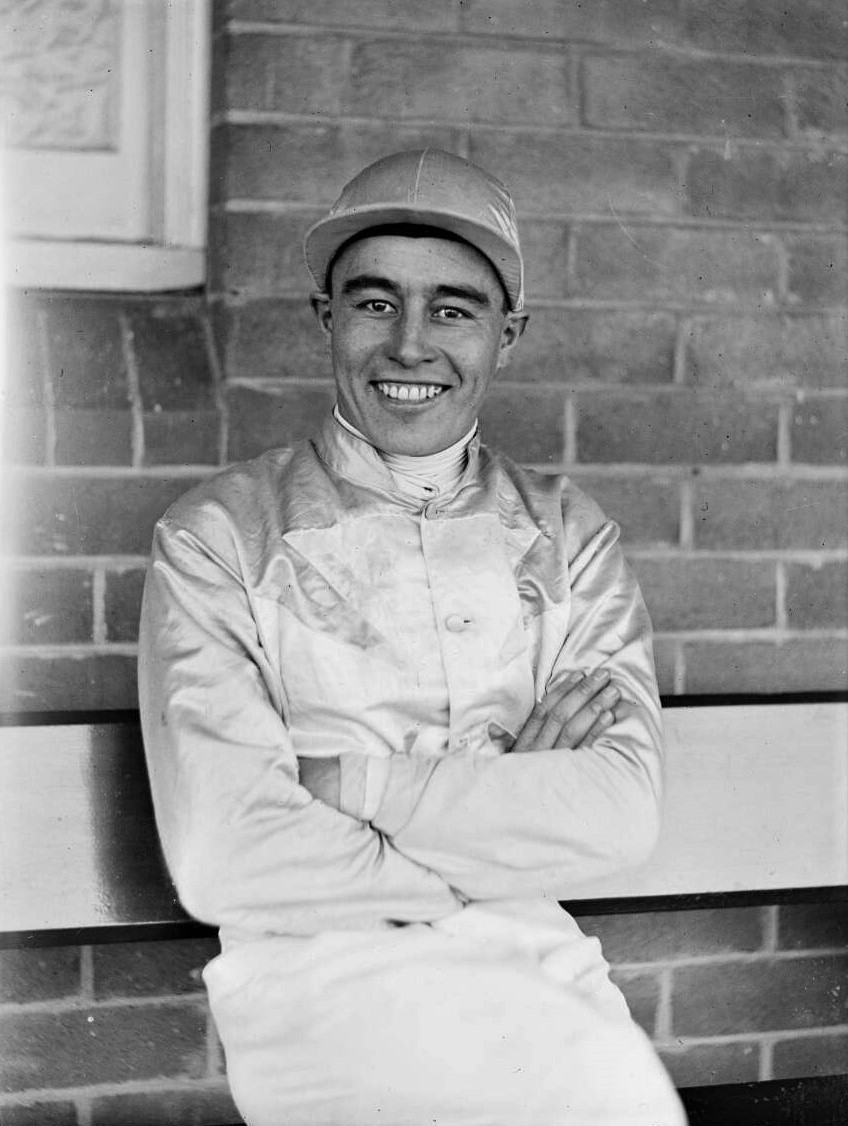
- Rae Johnstone

Personal information
- Born: 13 April 1905 New South Wales
- Died: 29 April 1964 (aged 59)
- Occupation: Jockey

Horse racing career
- Sport: Horse racing

Major racing wins
- British Classic Race Wins (12); 2,000 Guineas (1934); 1,000 Guineas (1935, 1947, 1950); Epsom Oaks (1947, 1950, 1954); Epsom Derby (1948, 1950, 1956); St. Leger Stakes (1950, 1951) French Classic Race Wins (12); Poule d'Essai des Pouliches (1935, 1950, 1951); Poule d'Essai des Poulains (1939, 1949); Prix De Diane (1947); Prix du Jockey Club (1948, 1950, 1952); Grand Prix de Paris (1948); Prix Royal-Oak (1951, 1954) Irish Classic Race Wins (7); Irish Derby (1948, 1949); Irish Oaks (1950); Irish 2000 Guineas (1953, 1955); Irish St Leger (1953); Irish 1000 Guineas (1956) Other Major Victories; AJC Railway Handicap (1921); Oakleigh Plate (1931); AJC Oaks (1931); Grand Prix de Saint-Cloud (1934); Prix de la Forêt (1935, 1950, 1956); Prix Vermeille (1945); Prix de l'Arc de Triomphe (1945, 1954); Prix Jacques Le Marois (1946, 1949); Prix Morny (1948, 1951); Cheveley Park Stakes (1949, 1955); Prix Robert Papin (1950, 1952); Prix d'Ispahan (1951, 1952); Dewhurst Stakes (1951); Prix Lupin (1954); Champion Stakes (1956)

Significant horses
- Colombo, Mesa, Imprudence, Camaree, My Love, Galcador, Lavandin, Asmena, Sun Cap, Scratch, Talma, Sayani, Nikellora, Sica Boy

William Raphael "Rae" Johnstone (13 April 1905 – 29 April 1964), was an Australian flat-race jockey. After enjoying considerable success in his native country, he relocated to Europe in 1932 and spent most of the rest of his life in France. He won twelve British Classic Races and two Prix de l'Arc de Triomphes. On his retirement in 1957 he was described as "one of the greatest international jockeys of modern times". He died of a heart attack in 1964.

== Background ==
Rae Johnstone was born to Robert James Johnstone (a coalminer) and Elizabeth Johnstone (nee Harvey) in 1905 in New Lambton, a suburb of Newcastle, New South Wales. In later life he was somewhat evasive when talking about his origins, claiming that his original surname was Davies and on others that he was of Portuguese descent. There is some evidence, however, that he may have attempted to conceal the fact that he was of Australian Aborigine heritage. Early in his riding career he was nicknamed "Togo" after Admiral Togo on account of his dark complexion and "oriental" appearance: Johnstone reportedly found the name offensive.

== Riding career ==
Johnstone began his riding career in Australia, winning his first race in 1920 at the age of 15. He had several brushes with the racing authorities and received a two-year ban in 1927 after he "conspired to lose a race". In 1931 he was the Champion Jockey in Sydney and began to attract attention from abroad. By that time he had won more than 600 races in Australia and also ridden successfully in India. In the following year he travelled to France to take up a position as the retained jockey for Pierre Wertheimer and moved to England two years later to ride for Lord Glanely. He made an immediate impact by winning the 2000 Guineas aboard Colombo but was criticised for his tactics when finishing third on the same colt in the Epsom Derby and returned to France shortly afterwards. In the following year he partnered the French-trained filly Mesa to win the 1000 Guineas. In his early career Johnstone had been known to bet of his mounts, but gave up gambling on his second marriage in 1940.

During the Second World War Johnstone was rejected for military service and briefly went back to India, before resuming his riding career in France. In 1942 he was interned by the occupying forces but returned to race-riding in late 1944. In 1945 he won the Prix de l'Arc de Triomphe on Nikellora.

In the immediate post-war period Johnstone had great success riding French-trained horses in major British races. Between 1947 and 1956 he won the 1000 Guineas on Imprudence and Camaree, the Derby on My Love, Galcador and Lavandin, the Epsom Oaks on Imprudence, Asmena and Sun Cap and the St Leger on Scratch and Talma. In France he won a second Arc de Triomphe on Sica Boy in 1954. Arguably the best horse he rode however was Sayani on whom he won the Cambridgeshire Handicap in 1946.

Johntone regarded his Derby win on My Love as his greatest achievement. He rode in the United States but did not enjoy the experience, commenting "There's no atmosphere. As far as I can make out, people go to races in America to eat sandwiches and hot dogs and to bet on a number".

== Riding style ==
Johntone was known for his judgment of pace and mastery of waiting tactics. He acquired the nickname "The Crocodile" because "he comes from behind and eats you up". He was also reluctant to use the whip on horses who were already beaten, which led to accusations of a lack of effort. He defended himself by saying "If the owner wants me to place, I’ll try. But I don't like to ride a horse into the ground for nothing".

== Later life ==
Johnstone retired from riding to become a trainer. He died in Paris on 29 April 1964 after suffering a heart attack at Le Tremblay racecourse.

== Personal life ==
Johnstone was married twice. In June 1925 he married Ruby Isabel Hornery-Ford but their partnership was short-lived. In 1940 he married Marie Marcelle Augustine Goubé, a former dancer at the Folies Bergere. His second marriage lasted until his death although he also carried on a long-term relationship with a mistress, Margo Winnick.
