= Glenstal (horse) =

American-bred Thoroughbred racehorse

- Sire: Northern Dancer
- Grandsire: Nearctic
- Dam: Cloonlara
- Damsire: Sir Ivor
- Sex: Stallion
- Foaled: 6 April 1980
- Country: United States
- Colour: Bay
- Breeder: Swettenham Stud
- Owner: Robert Sangster
- Trainer: Vincent O'Brien
- Record: 5: 3-1-0

Major wins
- National Stakes (1982); Prix Daphnis (1983)

Awards
- Timeform rating 112p (1982), 118 (1983)

Glenstal (6 April 1980 – 6 October 2007) was an American-bred, Irish-trained Thoroughbred racehorse and sire. In a brief racing career which lasted from July 1982 until July 1983 he won three of his five races. After winning on his first appearance he won the National Stakes on his second and final start of the year. In 1983 he finished second on his seasonal debut and rebounded from a poor run at Royal Ascot to win the Prix Daphnis. He stood as a breeding stallion in Ireland, Hungary and the Czech Republic and had some success as a sire of winners before dying in 2007 at the age of twenty-seven.

== Background ==
Glenstal was a "medium-sized, attractive" bay horse with no white markings bred in Kentucky by his owner, Robert Sangster's Swettenham Stud. He was sent to race in Europe where he entered training with Vincent O'Brien at Ballydoyle.

He was sired by the Canadian-bred Northern Dancer who won the Kentucky Derby in 1964 and went on to become an exceptionally successful and influential breeding stallion. Glenstal was the second foal of his dam Cloonlara, a top-class performer who was rated the best two-year-old filly in Europe in 1976. Cloonlara's dam Fish Bar produced several other winners including the leading miler Kings Lake, to whom Glenstal bore a striking resemblance. Fish Bar herself was a granddaughter of the 1000 Guineas and St Leger Stakes winner Herringbone, whose other descendants included Moon Madness, Celtic Swing and Michelozzo.

== Racing career ==
=== 1982: two-year-old season ===
Glenstal made his debut in a maiden race over six furlongs at the Curragh in July and won by a short head from the John Oxx-trained Najran. The form of the race was subsequently boosted when Najran ran third to Sweet Emma in the Group 1 Phoenix Stakes. In September the colt was stepped up in class for the Group 2 National Stakes over seven furlongs at the Curragh in which he was partnered by Vincent Rossiter, a veteran jockey who was by that time mainly employed as a work-rider at Ballydoyle. Glenstal was very much Vincent O'Brien's "second string", starting at odds of 14/1 whilst his stablemate Lomond went off the 2/7 favourite, with the best-fancied of the other seven runners being the Kevin Prendergast-trained Burslem. After tracking the leaders in the early stages, Glenstal made progress in the last quarter mile, went to the front inside the final furlong and won "a shade comfortably" by a length and a short head from Burslem and Lomond.

In the official International Classification for 1982, Glenstal was rated the third-best juvenile colt in Ireland behind his stablemates Danzatore and Caerleon. The independent Timeform organisation gave him a rating of 112p (the "p" indicating that he was expected to make more than the usual improvement) making him 21 pounds inferior to their best two-year-old Diesis.

=== 1983: three-year-old season ===
On his first appearance of 1983, Glenstal was dropped back to sprint distances for a six furlong event at Phoenix Park Racecourse in April but went down by a head to Sir Prince John after what Timeform described as a "ding-dong battle". He was sent to England in June for the St James's Palace Stakes at Royal Ascot but after becoming upset in the starting stalls he never looked likely to win and came home sixth of the seven runners. In the following month the colt was sent to France to contest the Prix Daphnis over 1400 metres at Evry Racecourse in what proved to be his final race. Ridden by Yves Saint-Martin, he led from the start, accelerated just after half-way and held off a late challenge from Luderic to win by a short neck. He never raced again and was retired to stud at the end of the season.

== Stud record ==
Glenstal was retired from racing to become a breeding stallion at the Longfield Stud in County Tipperary, standing at an initial fee of 20,000 Irish guineas. He moved to Hungary in 1993 and then to the Czech Republic in 2001. He was pensioned from stud duty in 2005 and died of a heart attack on 6 October 2007.

The best of Glenstal's offspring included Las Meninas, Candy Glen (Premio Parioli) and Glen Kate (Monrovia Stakes). He also had considerable success as a National Hunt stallion, with his best winners over jumps including the Ladbroke Hurdle winner Glencloud and the mare Deb's Ball who won 15 races including the West Yorkshire Hurdle and foaled the Betfred Gold Cup winner Hot Weld.

== Pedigree ==
Pedigree of Glenstal (USA), bay stallion, 1980
Sire Northern Dancer (CAN) 1961	Nearctic (CAN); 1954	Nearco	Pharos
Sire Northern Dancer (CAN) 1961	Nearctic (CAN); 1954	Nearco	Nogara
Sire Northern Dancer (CAN) 1961	Nearctic (CAN); 1954	Lady Angela	Hyperion
Sire Northern Dancer (CAN) 1961	Nearctic (CAN); 1954	Lady Angela	Sister Sarah
Sire Northern Dancer (CAN) 1961	Natalma (USA); 1957	Native Dancer	Polynesian
Sire Northern Dancer (CAN) 1961	Natalma (USA); 1957	Native Dancer	Geisha
Sire Northern Dancer (CAN) 1961	Natalma (USA); 1957	Almahmoud	Mahmoud
Sire Northern Dancer (CAN) 1961	Natalma (USA); 1957	Almahmoud	Arbitrator
Dam Cloonlara (USA) 1974	Sir Ivor (USA); 1965	Sir Gaylord	Turn-To
Dam Cloonlara (USA) 1974	Sir Ivor (USA); 1965	Sir Gaylord	Somethingroyal
Dam Cloonlara (USA) 1974	Sir Ivor (USA); 1965	Attica	Mr Trouble
Dam Cloonlara (USA) 1974	Sir Ivor (USA); 1965	Attica	Athenia
Dam Cloonlara (USA) 1974	Fish Bar (IRE); 1967	Baldric	Round Table
Dam Cloonlara (USA) 1974	Fish Bar (IRE); 1967	Baldric	Two Cities
Dam Cloonlara (USA) 1974	Fish Bar (IRE); 1967	Fisherman's Wharf	Alycidon
Dam Cloonlara (USA) 1974	Fish Bar (IRE); 1967	Fisherman's Wharf	Herringbone (Family 8-c)
