= Sayani (horse) =

French-bred Thoroughbred racehorse

- Sire: Fair Copy
- Grandsire: Fairway
- Dam: Perfume
- Damsire: Badruddin
- Sex: Stallion
- Foaled: 1943
- Country: France
- Colour: Bay
- Breeder: Haras de Piencourt-Bailleul
- Owner: Mme Joseph Lieux
- Trainer: Joseph Lieux
- Record: 15: 10-1-3

Major wins
- Prix d'Arenberg (1945); Prix Edmond Blanc (1946); Prix Daphnis (1946); Jersey Stakes (1946); Prix Jacques le Marois (1946); Cambridgeshire Handicap (1946)

Awards
- Leading sire in France (1953)

Sayani (1943 – after 1958) was a French Thoroughbred racehorse and sire. He was best known for his form as a three-year-old in 1946 when he won several important stakes races in England and France including the Prix Edmond Blanc, Prix Daphnis, Jersey Stakes and Prix Jacques le Marois. His best performance however, came when he recovered from a poor start to win the Cambridgeshire Handicap under a record weight. He was then retired to stud and became a successful breeding stallion first in France and later in Brazil.

== Background ==
Sayani was a big, heavily built bay horse, variously described as resembling an "ox" or a "bullock" bred in France by Brian Guinness at the Haras de Piencourt-Bailleul. He was probably the best horse sired by Fair Copy, who won the Middle Park Stakes and finished second in the 1937 St Leger. Sayani's dam Perfume was a very successful broodmare who also produced the 2000 Guineas winner My Babu and was the female-line ancestor of the Irish Derby English Prince.

Sayani was trained in France by Joseph Lieux and raced in the ownership of his trainer's wife. Lieux developed an unusual training regimen which seemed to suit the colt. He would bring him to peak fitness a week to ten days before a race and then gave him no serious exercise until he actually ran.

== Racing career ==
=== 1945: two-year-old season ===
Sayani showed good form as a two-year-old, recording his most important success in the Prix d'Arenberg over 1100 metres at Longchamp Racecourse.

=== 1946: three-year-old season ===
In the spring of 1946, Sayani established himself as a leading contender for the major three-year-old races with wins in the Prix Edmond Blanc 1,600 metres at Saint-Cloud and the Prix Daphnis over 1850 metres at Le Tremblay. He was then moved up in class and started odds-on favourite for the Poule d'Essai des Poulains but finished third to Pactole.

In June, Sayani was brought back in distance and sent to England to contest the Jersey Stakes over seven furlongs at Royal Ascot. Ridden by Roger Poincelet, he started at odds of 100/6 and won from the filly Wayward Belle, who went on to win the Nassau Stakes. Later that year in England he won the Godolphin Plate at Hurst Park and the Select Stakes (not the current race of the same name) at Newmarket. In August at Deauville Racecourse he won the Prix Jacques le Marois, which was then a race confined to three-year-olds.

In October 1946, Sayani returned to England to contest the Cambridgeshire, an all-aged handicap race over nine furlongs at Newmarket. He was lodged at the stable of Jack Reardon at Epsom, where Lieux's policy of strictly limiting the colt's physical activity drew adverse comment from local horsemen. Carrying a weight of 130 pounds, he was ridden by the Australian jockey Rae Johnstone and started a 25/1 outsider in a thirty-four runner field. The start of the race was extremely rough and Sayani appeared to have lost his chance when he was badly hampered and almost brought down in the first furlong. The colt was able to recover and Johnstone produced him with a late run to take the lead in the final strides. He won by a head from the Irish 2000 Guineas winner Claro to whom he was conceding fifteen pounds, with Toronto a head away in third. His weight set the record in the race: only the American colt Foxhall in 1881 and the four-year-old Florence three years later had previously won under more than 126 pounds.

== Assessment ==
In their book A Century of Champions, based on a modified version of the Timeform system, John Randall and Tony Morris rated Sayani the ninety-eighth best racehorse of twentieth century, the nineteenth best horse of the century to have been trained in France, and the second best horse foaled in 1943.

Phil Bull described Sayani's victory as "the greatest performance by any horse in 1946".

== Stud record ==
Sayani was retired from racing to become a breeding stallion, beginning his new career in 1947 at a record stud fee of 300,000 francs. The best of his offspring was La Sorellina who won the Prix de Diane and the Prix de l'Arc de Triomphe enabling Sayani to win the title of Leading sire in France in 1953. In the same year he was sold and exported to Brazil.

== Pedigree ==
Pedigree of Sayani (FR), bay stallion, 1943
Sire Fair Copy (GB) 1932	Fairway (GB); 1925	Phalaris	Polymelus
Sire Fair Copy (GB) 1932	Fairway (GB); 1925	Phalaris	Bromus
Sire Fair Copy (GB) 1932	Fairway (GB); 1925	Scapa Flow	Chaucer
Sire Fair Copy (GB) 1932	Fairway (GB); 1925	Scapa Flow	Anchora
Sire Fair Copy (GB) 1932	Composure (GB); 1924	Buchan	Sunstar
Sire Fair Copy (GB) 1932	Composure (GB); 1924	Buchan	Hamoaze
Sire Fair Copy (GB) 1932	Composure (GB); 1924	Serenissima	Minoru
Sire Fair Copy (GB) 1932	Composure (GB); 1924	Serenissima	Gondolette
Dam Perfume (GB) 1932	Badruddin (FR); 1931	Blandford	Swynford
Dam Perfume (GB) 1932	Badruddin (FR); 1931	Blandford	Blanche
Dam Perfume (GB) 1932	Badruddin (FR); 1931	Mumtaz Mahal	The Tetrarch
Dam Perfume (GB) 1932	Badruddin (FR); 1931	Mumtaz Mahal	Lady Josephine
Dam Perfume (GB) 1932	Lavendula (FR); 1930	Pharos	Phalaris
Dam Perfume (GB) 1932	Lavendula (FR); 1930	Pharos	Scapa Flow
Dam Perfume (GB) 1932	Lavendula (FR); 1930	Sweet Lavender	Swynford
Dam Perfume (GB) 1932	Lavendula (FR); 1930	Sweet Lavender	Marchetta (Family: 1-w)

- Both Sayani's grandsire Fairway and his great-grandsire Pharos were sired by Phalaris out of the mare Scapa Flow. He was also inbred 4 x 4 to Swynford, who appeared twice in the fourth generation of his pedigree.
