= Haras de Fresnay-le-Buffard =

Haras de Fresnay-le-Buffard was a Thoroughbred horse breeding farm in Neuvy-au-Houlme in the Orne department in Lower Normandy, France purchased by Marcel Boussac in 1919. Widely respected, Marcel Boussac was called "the greatest of French breeders" by John P. Sparkman, an editor with Thoroughbred Times. Boussac's highly successful operation produced a number of racing champions through its numerous top foundation broodmares and world class sires.

Among the many top runners from Haras de Fresnay-Le-Buffard were Corrida, Djebel, Pharis, Ardan, and Marsyas. For breeding purposes, Marcel Boussac purchased the United States Triple Crown winner Whirlaway and sold the mare La Troienne to Edward R. Bradley's Idle Hour Stock Farm in Lexington, Kentucky who became one of the most influential mares to be imported into the U.S. in the 20th century. He also bred, raced, and ultimately sold Ambiorix to Claiborne Farm in Kentucky who became the Leading sire in North America in 1961.

Following the German occupation of France the Nazis seized some of the best racehorses in the country including those at Haras de Fresnay-Le-Buffard who were shipped to Germany to be used for breeding at the German National Stud. Following the end of the War in 1945, some of these horses were recovered and returned to stud duty.

French Champion sires bred at Haras de Fresnay-Le-Buffard were:

- Astérus (1934)
- Tourbillon (1940, 1942, 1945)
- Pharis (1944)
- Goya II (1947, 1948)
- Djebel (1949, 1956)

In the late 1970s, Marcel Boussac's business empire ran into severe financial difficulties that led to bankruptcy. Haras de Fresnay-le-Buffard was sold to Fresnay Agricole S.A. who owned it for only a short time before selling it to Stavros Niarchos, who won big victories with Spinning World, Karakonties, and Dream Well. In 2025, Haras de Fresnay-Le-Buffard was bought by Manchester City FC owner Mansour bin Zayed al-Nahyan, through his Al Wathba Stud in Abu Dhabi.

Since 1986 the stable has been the main sponsor of the Prix Jacques Le Marois.
