= Scratch (horse) =

French-bred Thoroughbred racehorse

- Sire: Pharis
- Grandsire: Pharos
- Dam: Orlamonde
- Damsire: Asterus
- Sex: Stallion
- Foaled: 1947
- Country: France
- Colour: Chestnut
- Breeder: Marcel Boussac
- Owner: Marcel Boussac
- Trainer: Charles Semblat
- Record: 12: 7-1-0 (incomplete)

Major wins
- Solario Stakes (1949); Prix de Guiche (1950); Prix Greffulhe (1950); Prix du Jockey Club (1950); St Leger Stakes (1950); Prix Jean Prat (1951)

Awards
- Timeform rating: 134

Scratch, also known as Scratch II (foaled 1947) was a French Thoroughbred racehorse and sire best known for winning the Prix du Jockey Club and the classic St Leger Stakes in 1950. Scratch won the Solario Stakes in England as a two-year-old and emerged as one of the best of a very strong generation of French-trained colts in the following year. He won the Prix de Guiche and Prix Greffulhe in the early part of the year and then defeated the year's outstanding three-year-old colt Tantieme in the Prix du Jockey Club. In the autumn of 1950 he won the St Leger by defeating Vieux Manoir, who had beaten him in the Grand Prix de Paris. He won the Prix Jean Prat as a four-year-old before being retired to stud where he had an unremarkable record as a sire of winners in Europe and South America.

== Background ==
Scratch was a chestnut horse with a white star and a white sock on his right hind leg bred by his owner Marcel Boussac. He was sired by Pharis, the undefeated winner of the 1939 Grand Prix de Paris. Scratch's dam Orlamonde was an unsuccessful racehorse but produced several other winners including Damno, who won the Prix d'Arenberg. Orlamonde's dam Naic was a half sister of the Prix du Jockey Club winner Ramus and also produced the Grand Prix de Deauville winner Jock. Scratch was sent into training with Charles Semblat at Chantilly.

== Racing career ==
=== 1949: two-year-old season ===
Scratch won twice as a two-year-old in 1949. In late summer he was sent to England for the Solario Stakes of seven furlongs at Sandown Park Racecourse. He was ridden by the British-born, French-based jockey Charlie Elliott and won at odds of 7/4.

=== 1950: three-year-old season ===
In the spring of his three-year-old season, Scratch won the Prix de Guiche over 1800 metres at Chantilly Racecourse and the Prix Greffulhe (beating L'Amiral) over 2100 at Longchamp Racecourse. He was beaten into second place by Lacaduv in the Prix Noailles at Longchamp.

In June, Scratch faced Lacaduv again in the Prix du Jockey Club over 2400m at Chantilly. Scratch was ridden by the Australian jockey Rae Johnstone and started at odds of 3.8/1 against fourteen opponents. In an extremely close finish, Scratch won by a short-head from the François Mathet-trained Tantieme, with Lacaduv in third place. In his next race, Scratch was moved up in distance for the Grand Prix de Paris over 3000m at Longchamp. He finished fourth behind Vieux Manoir, Alizier and Lacaduv.

On 9 September, Scratch was sent to England to contest the St Leger over 14 furlongs at Doncaster Racecourse in which he was again opposed by Vieux Manoir. Ridden by Johntone, he started at odds of 9/2 in a field of fifteen runners. Saturn made the early running before Vieux Manoir, the favourite, took the lead five furlongs from the finish. Scratch was not among the early leaders but finished strongly to overtake Vieux Manoir inside the final furlong and win by a length, with the two French colts finishing five lengths clear of the British filly Sanlinea. He became the first French horse to win the St Leger since Rayon d'Or in 1870. Scratch's win gave Semblat his third British classic of the 1950 after winning The Derby with Galcador and the Oaks with Asmena and helped to make him British Champion trainer despite the fact that he had never set foot in the country during the season, On his return from England, Scratch ran in France's most prestigious race, the Prix de l'Arc de Triomphe over 2400m at Longchamp. He finished fourth of the twelve runners behind Tantieme, Alizier and L'Amiral.

=== 1951: four-year-old season ===
In May 1951 won the older horses' version of the Prix Jean Prat over 3000m at Longchamp. He finished unplaced behind Pan in the Ascot Gold Cup and was again unplaced behind Supreme Court in the inaugural running of the King George VI and Queen Elizabeth Stakes.

== Assessment ==
In 1950, the independent Timeform organisation gave Scratch a rating of 134, placing him two pounds below the top-rated three-year-old Tantieme. In their book, A Century of Champions, based on the Timeform rating system, John Randall and Tony Morris rated Scratch a "superior" winner of the St Leger.

== Stud record ==
Scratch was retired from racing to become a breeding stallion. In his third and final season at stud in Europe he sired Dushka, a filly who won the Prix de Diane in 1958. In 1955 Scratch was offered for sale at auction: he was sold for £52,500 and exported to Argentina.

== Pedigree ==
Pedigree of Scratch (FR), chestnut stallion 1947
Sire Pharis (FR) 1936	Pharos (GB); 1920	Phalaris	Polymelus
Sire Pharis (FR) 1936	Pharos (GB); 1920	Phalaris	Bromus
Sire Pharis (FR) 1936	Pharos (GB); 1920	Scapa Flow	Chaucer
Sire Pharis (FR) 1936	Pharos (GB); 1920	Scapa Flow	Anchora
Sire Pharis (FR) 1936	Carissima (FR); 1923	Clarissimus	Radium
Sire Pharis (FR) 1936	Carissima (FR); 1923	Clarissimus	Quintessence
Sire Pharis (FR) 1936	Carissima (FR); 1923	Casquetts	Captivation
Sire Pharis (FR) 1936	Carissima (FR); 1923	Casquetts	Cassis
Dam Orlamonde (FR) 1937	Asterus (FR); 1923	Teddy	Ajax
Dam Orlamonde (FR) 1937	Asterus (FR); 1923	Teddy	Rondeau
Dam Orlamonde (FR) 1937	Asterus (FR); 1923	Astrella	Verdun
Dam Orlamonde (FR) 1937	Asterus (FR); 1923	Astrella	Saint Astra
Dam Orlamonde (FR) 1937	Naic (FR); 1928	Gainsborough	Bayardo
Dam Orlamonde (FR) 1937	Naic (FR); 1928	Gainsborough	Rosedrop
Dam Orlamonde (FR) 1937	Naic (FR); 1928	Only One	Son o' Mine
Dam Orlamonde (FR) 1937	Naic (FR); 1928	Only One	Omorca (Family: 14-f)
