= Mesa (horse) =

French-bred Thoroughbred racehorse

- Sire: Kircubbin
- Grandsire: Captivation
- Dam: Mackwiller
- Damsire: Marveldt
- Sex: Mare
- Foaled: 1932
- Country: France
- Colour: Bay
- Breeder: Pierre Corbiere
- Owner: Pierre Wertheimer
- Trainer: Albert Swann
- Record: 10: 4-3-2

Major wins
- Poule des Foals (1934); 1000 Guineas (1935)

Mesa (1932–1941) was a French Thoroughbred racehorse and broodmare. She showed very good form as a juvenile when she won two races and finished third in the Grand Critérium. In the following year she was sent to England where she won the 1000 Guineas and looked unlucky when finishing third in Epsom Oaks. She also finished second in the Prix du Président de la République and the Prix de La Jonchere and ran fifth in the Grand Prix de Paris. She made a very promising start to her time as a broodmare before dying at the age of nine.

== Background ==
Mesa was a "plain" bay mare bred by Pierre Corbiere at his Nonant-le-Pin stud in France and was leased to Pierre Wertheimer during her racing career. She was trained at Chantilly in France by Albert Swann.

She was sired by the Irish stallion Kircubbin who won the Irish St Leger as a three-year-old before being sent to France where he won the Prix d'Ispahan and the Prix du Président de la République. He was the Leading sire in France in 1930. Mesa's dam Mackwiller was a top-class racehorse who won the Poule d'Essai des Pouliches in 1926. Apart from Mesa she produced the influential broodmares Mammee (female-line ancestor of Vimy and Ma Biche) and Muscida (ancestor of Classic Park and Court Masterpiece).

== Racing career ==
=== 1934: two-year-old season ===
As a two-year-old Mesa won a minor race and then took the valuable Poule des Foals over 1400 metres at Deauville Racecourse. In autumn he was matched against male opposition in France' most prestigious juvenile race, the Grand Critérium over 1600 metres at Longchamp Racecourse and finished third behind Pampeiro and Corrida. On her other start he ran second to Tulifer in the Poule de Deux Ans.

=== 1935: three-year-old season ===
Mesa began her second campaign in the Prix de La Jonchere over 1400 metres in 22 April and came home second, beaten a short head by the seven-year-old Jus de Raisin. On 3 May the filly was sent to England for the 122nd runner of the 1000 Guineas over the Rowley Mile at Newmarket Racecourse, in which he was ridden by Rae Johnstone and started at odds of 8/1 in a twenty-two runner field. The Queen Mary Stakes winner Caretta started favourite while the other fancied runners included Corrida, Lair, Annabel and Ankaret. Mesa won by three lengths from Hyndford Bridge with Caretta one and a half lengths back in third.

Mesa was moved up in distance to contest the Oaks Stakes over one and a half miles at Epsom Racecourse and started the 5/4 favourite. She was again partnered by Rae Johnstone, despite the jockey having received a seven-day suspension while riding in France. She finished third to Quashed and Ankaret, beaten just over a length by the winner, but looked an unlucky loser, making up almost ten lengths in the closing stages after failing to obtain a clear run until the final furlong. Johnstone was widely adjudged to have ridden a poor race, having elected to make his challenge on the inside through the thick of the field.

In the Grand Prix de Paris on 30 June she ran well but finished fifth of the twenty-two runners behind the upset winner Crudité. On her final racecourse appearance in the Prix du Président de la République at Saint-Cloud Racecourse a week later Mesa took the lead in the straight but was overtaken in the closing stages and finished second to Louqsor.

== Assessment and honours ==
In their book, A Century of Champions, based on the Timeform rating system, John Randall and Tony Morris rated Mesa an "average" winner of the 1000 Guineas.

== Breeding record ==
In 1936 Mesa was bought by Sir Malcolm McAlpine and retired to become a broodmare. She produced at least three foals before dying of a "twisted gut" in 1941. Her foals were:

- Historic, a bay colt, foaled in 1939, sired by Solario. Won six races, second in the Jockey Club Cup.
- Solesa, bay filly, 1940, by Solario. Won one race. Dam of Ratification (Coventry Stakes) and Native Heath (John Porter Stakes).
- Rameses, bay colt, 1941, by Bahram

== Pedigree ==
Pedigree of Mesa (FR), bay mare, 1932
Sire Kircubbin (IRE) 1893	Captivation (GB); 1902	Cyllene	Bona Vista
Sire Kircubbin (IRE) 1893	Captivation (GB); 1902	Cyllene	Arcadia
Sire Kircubbin (IRE) 1893	Captivation (GB); 1902	Charm	St Simon
Sire Kircubbin (IRE) 1893	Captivation (GB); 1902	Charm	Tact
Sire Kircubbin (IRE) 1893	Avon Hack; 1907	Hackler (GB)	Petrarch
Sire Kircubbin (IRE) 1893	Avon Hack; 1907	Hackler (GB)	Hackness
Sire Kircubbin (IRE) 1893	Avon Hack; 1907	Avonbeg (GB)	Queen's Birthday
Sire Kircubbin (IRE) 1893	Avon Hack; 1907	Avonbeg (GB)	Avoca
Dam Mackwiller (FR) 1923	Verwood; 1910	Grey Plume (GB)	Grey Leg
Dam Mackwiller (FR) 1923	Verwood; 1910	Grey Plume (GB)	Gantlet
Dam Mackwiller (FR) 1923	Verwood; 1910	Kildonan (GB)	Ladas
Dam Mackwiller (FR) 1923	Verwood; 1910	Kildonan (GB)	Lochnell
Dam Mackwiller (FR) 1923	Marveldt (GB); 1886	Marcovil	Marco
Dam Mackwiller (FR) 1923	Marveldt (GB); 1886	Marcovil	Lady Villikins
Dam Mackwiller (FR) 1923	Marveldt (GB); 1886	Veldt	Pietermaritzburg
Dam Mackwiller (FR) 1923	Marveldt (GB); 1886	Veldt	Furze Bush (Family: 1-u)
