= Prix du Jockey Club =

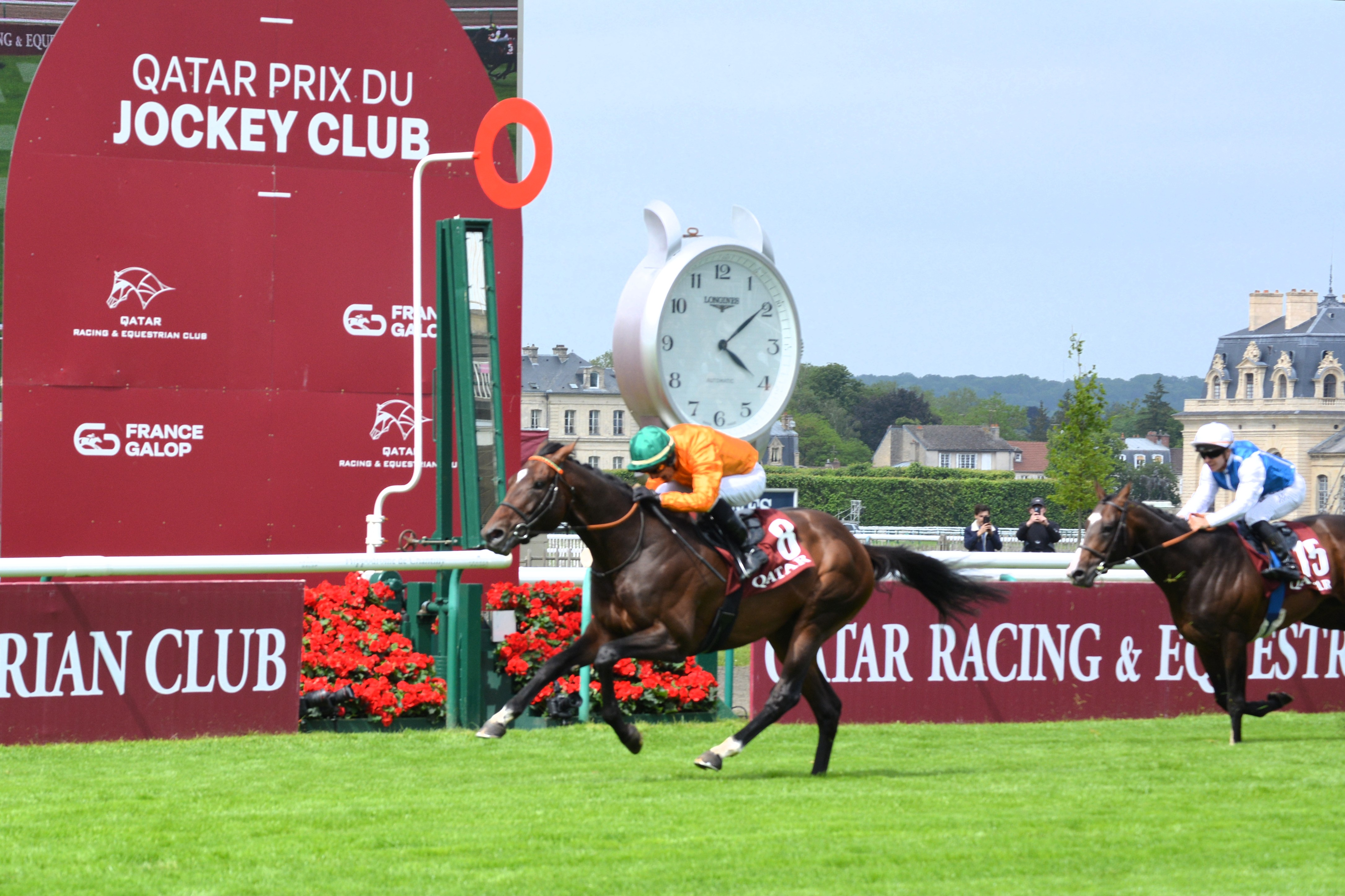
- Look de Vega's victory in 2024
- Class: Group 1
- Location: Chantilly Racecourse; Chantilly, France
- Inaugurated: 1836
- Race type: Flat / Thoroughbred
- Sponsor: Qatar
- Website: Official website

Race information
- Distance: 2,100 metres (1m 2½f)
- Surface: Turf
- Track: Right-handed
- Qualification: Three-year-olds excluding geldings
- Weight: 58.2 kg Allowances; 1½ kg for fillies
- Purse: €1,500,000 (2023); 1st: €857,100

Prix du Jockey Club
2026
Constitution River	Hawk Mountain	Montreal

Previous years
2025
Camille Pissarro	Cualificar	Detain
2024
Look De Vega	First Look	Sosie
2023
Ace Impact	Big Rock	Marhaba Ya Sanafi
2022
Vadeni	El Bodegon	Modern Games
2021
St Mark's Basilica	Sealiway	Millebosc

2020-2011
2020
Mishriff	The Summit	Victor Ludorum
2019
Sottsass	Persian King	Motamarris
2018
Study Of Man	Patascoy	Louis D'Or
2017
Brametot	Waldgeist	Recoletos
2016
Almanzor	Zarak	Dicton
2015
New Bay	Highland Reel	War Dispatch
2014
The Grey Gatsby	Shamkiyr	Prince Gibraltar
2013
Intello	Morandi	Sky Hunter
2012
Saonois	Saint Baudolino	Nutello
2011
Reliable Man	Bubble Chic	Baraan

2010–2001
2010
Lope De Vega	Planteur	Pain Perdu
2009
Le Havre	Fuisse	Westphalia
2008
Vision d'Etat	Famous Name	Natagora
2007
Lawman	Literato	Shamdinan
2006
Darsi	Best Name	Arras
2005
Shamardal	Hurricane Run	Rocamadour
2004
Blue Canari	Prospect Park	Valixir
2003
Dalakhani	Super Celebre	Coroner
2002
Sulamani	Act One	Simeon
2001
Anabaa Blue	Chichicastenango	Grandera

2000–1991
2000
Holding Court	Lord Flasheart	Circus Dance
1999
Montjeu	Nowhere To Exit	Rhagaas
1998
Dream Well	Croco Rouge	Sestino
1997
Peintre Celebre	Oscar	Astarabad
1996
Ragmar	Polaris Flight	Le Destin
1995
Celtic Swing	Poliglote	Winged Love
1994
Celtic Arms	Solid Illusion	Alriffa
1993
Hernando	Dernier Empereur	Hunting Hawk
1992
Polytain	Marignan	Contested Bid
1991
Suave Dancer	Subotica	Cudas

1990–1981
1990
Sanglamore	Epervier Bleu	Erdelistan
1989
Old Vic	Dancehall	Galetto
1988
Hours After	Ghost Buster's	Emmson
1987
Natroun	Trempolino	Naheez
1986
Bering	Altayan	Bakharoff
1985
Mouktar	Air de Cour	Premier Role
1984
Darshaan	Sadler's Wells	Rainbow Quest
1983
Caerleon	L'Emigrant	Esprit du Nord
1982
Assert	Real Shadai	Bois de Grace
1981
Bikala	Akarad	Gap of Dunloe

The Prix du Jockey Club, sometimes referred to as the French Derby, is a Group 1 flat horse race in France open to three-year-old thoroughbred colts and fillies. It is run at Chantilly over a distance of 2,100 metres (about 1 mile and 2½ furlongs) each year in early June.

== History ==
The format of the race was inspired by the English Derby, and it was named in homage to the Jockey Club based at Newmarket in England. It was established in 1836, and it was originally restricted to horses born and bred in France. Its distance was initially 2,500 metres, which was cut to 2,400 metres in 1843. It was switched to Versailles during the Revolution of 1848, and it was cancelled due to the Franco-Prussian War in 1871.

The race was abandoned in 1915, and for three years thereafter it was replaced by the Prix des Trois Ans. This took place at Moulins in 1916, Chantilly in 1917 and Maisons-Laffitte in 1918. The first two runnings after World War I were held at Longchamp.

A substitute race called the Prix de Chantilly was run at Auteuil over 2,600 metres in 1940. The Prix du Jockey Club was staged at Longchamp in 1941 and 1942, and at Le Tremblay over 2,300 metres in 1943 and 1944. It returned to Longchamp for the following three years, and on the second occasion it was opened to the best horses from any country.

The present system of race grading was introduced in 1971, and the Prix du Jockey Club was classed at the highest level, Group 1. The first foreign-trained horse to win was Assert in 1982. The distance was shortened to 2,100 metres in 2005.

Eleven winners of the Prix du Jockey Club have subsequently won the Prix de l'Arc de Triomphe. The first was Ksar in 1921, and the most recent was Ace Impact in 2023.

== Records ==
Leading jockey (9 wins):

- Yves Saint-Martin – Reliance (1965), Nelcius (1966), Tapalque (1968), Sassafras (1970), Acamas (1978), Top Ville (1979), Darshaan (1984), Mouktar (1985), Natroun (1987)

Leading trainer (10 wins):

- Tom Jennings Sr. – Porthos (1852), Monarque (1855), Ventre Saint Gris (1858), Black Prince (1859), Gabrielle d'Estrees (1861), Consul (1869), Insulaire (1878), Zut (1879), Albion (1881), Dandin (1882)

Leading owner (12 wins):

- Marcel Boussac – Ramus (1922), Tourbillon (1931), Thor (1933), Cillas (1938), Pharis (1939), Ardan (1944), Coaraze (1945), Sandjar (1947), Scratch (1950), Auriban (1952), Philius (1956), Acamas (1978)

== Winners since 1950 ==
Year	Winner	Jockey	Trainer	Owner	Time
1950	Scratch	Rae Johnstone	Charles Semblat	Marcel Boussac	2:32.2
1951	Sicambre	Paul Blanc	Max Bonaventure	Jean Stern	2:35.1
1952	Auriban	Rae Johnstone	Charles Semblat	Marcel Boussac	2:29.2
1953	Chamant	Maxime Garcia	Mick Bartholomew	Henri Letellier	2:29.4
1954	Le Petit Prince	René Bertiglia	Charles Semblat	Laudy Lawrence	2:43.3
1955	Rapace	Freddie Palmer	Robert Wallon	François de Ganay	2:37.4
1956	Philius	Serge Boullenger	Charlie Elliott	Marcel Boussac	2:45.1
1957	Amber	Maxime Garcia	Richard Carver	Mrs André Mariotti	2:34.0
1958	Tamanar	Jean Deforge	John Cunnington Sr.	Ramon Beamonte	2:34.8
1959	Herbager	Guy Chancelier	Pierre Pelat	Simone Del Duca	2:34.0
1960	Charlottesville	George Moore	Alec Head	HH Aga Khan IV	2:34.8
1961	Right Royal	Roger Poincelet	Etienne Pollet	Elisabeth Couturié	2:31.6
1962	Val de Loir	Freddie Palmer	Max Bonaventure	Marquise du Vivier	2:29.4
1963	Sanctus	Maurice Larraun	Etienne Pollet	Jean Ternynck	2:33.4
1964	Le Fabuleux	Jean Massard	William Head	Mrs Guy Weisweiller	2:32.4
1965	Reliance	Yves Saint-Martin	François Mathet	François Dupré	2:36.2
1966	Nelcius	Yves Saint-Martin	Miguel Clément	Paul Duboscq	2:36.8
1967	Astec	André Jézéquel	A. Lieux	Louis de La Rochette	2:29.8
1968	Tapalque	Yves Saint-Martin	François Mathet	Arpad Plesch	2:32.2
1969	Goodly	Freddy Head	William Head	Maurice Lehmann	2:30.4
1970	Sassafras	Yves Saint-Martin	François Mathet	Arpad Plesch	2:31.1
1971	Rheffic	Bill Pyers	François Mathet	Mrs François Dupré	2:32.0
1972	Hard to Beat	Lester Piggott	Richard Carver Jr.	Junzo Kashiyama	2:27.1
1973	Roi Lear	Freddy Head	Alec Head	Germaine Wertheimer	2:34.2
1974	Caracolero	Philippe Paquet	François Boutin	María Félix Berger	2:32.1
1975	Val de l'Orne	Freddy Head	Alec Head	Jacques Wertheimer	2:35.2
1976	Youth	Freddy Head	Maurice Zilber	Nelson Bunker Hunt	2:27.4
1977	Crystal Palace	Gérard Dubroeucq	François Mathet	Guy de Rothschild	2:29.6
1978	Acamas	Yves Saint-Martin	Guy Bonnaventure	Marcel Boussac	2:32.3
1979	Top Ville	Yves Saint-Martin	François Mathet	HH Aga Khan IV	2:25.3
1980	Policeman	Willie Carson	Charlie Milbank	Frederick Tinsley	2:27.3
1981	Bikala	Serge Gorli	Patrick Biancone	Jules Ouaki	2:29.5
1982	Assert	Christy Roche	David O'Brien	Robert Sangster	2:29.5
1983	Caerleon	Pat Eddery	Vincent O'Brien	Robert Sangster	2:27.3
1984	Darshaan	Yves Saint-Martin	Alain de Royer-Dupré	HH Aga Khan IV	2:32.2
1985	Mouktar	Yves Saint-Martin	Alain de Royer-Dupré	HH Aga Khan IV	2:34.0
1986	Bering	Gary Williams Moore	Criquette Head	Ghislaine Head	2:24.1
1987	Natroun	Yves Saint-Martin	Alain de Royer-Dupré	HH Aga Khan IV	2:30.8
1988	Hours After	Pat Eddery	Patrick Biancone	Marquesa de Moratalla	2:33.4
1989	Old Vic	Steve Cauthen	Henry Cecil	Sheikh Mohammed	2:28.7
1990	Sanglamore	Pat Eddery	Roger Charlton	Khalid Abdullah	2:24.7
1991	Suave Dancer	Cash Asmussen	John Hammond	Henri Chalhoub	2:27.4
1992	Polytain	Frankie Dettori	Antonio Spanu	Mrs Bruno Houillion	2:30.3
1993	Hernando	Cash Asmussen	François Boutin	Stavros Niarchos	2:27.2
1994	Celtic Arms	Gérald Mossé	Pascal Bary	Jean-Louis Bouchard	2:31.3
1995	Celtic Swing	Kevin Darley	Lady Herries	Peter Savill	2:32.8
1996	Ragmar	Gérald Mossé	Pascal Bary	Jean-Louis Bouchard	2:27.2
1997	Peintre Celebre	Olivier Peslier	André Fabre	Daniel Wildenstein	2:29.6
1998	Dream Well	Cash Asmussen	Pascal Bary	Niarchos family	2:29.3
1999	Montjeu	Cash Asmussen	John Hammond	Michael Tabor	2:33.5
2000	Holding Court	Philip Robinson	Michael Jarvis	John Good	2:31.8
2001	Anabaa Blue	Christophe Soumillon	Carlos Lerner	Charles Mimouni	2:27.9
2002	Sulamani	Thierry Thulliez	Pascal Bary	Niarchos family	2:25.0
2003	Dalakhani	Christophe Soumillon	Alain de Royer-Dupré	HH Aga Khan IV	2:26.7
2004	Blue Canari	Thierry Thulliez	Pascal Bary	Jean-Louis Bouchard	2:25.2
2005	Shamardal	Frankie Dettori	Saeed bin Suroor	Godolphin	2:09.0
2006	Darsi	Christophe Soumillon	Alain de Royer-Dupré	HH Aga Khan IV	2:05.8
2007	Lawman	Frankie Dettori	Jean-Marie Béguigné	Marzocco / Ciampi	2:05.9
2008	Vision d'Etat	Ioritz Mendizabal	Eric Libaud	Detré / Libaud	2:08.6
2009	Le Havre	Christophe Lemaire	Jean-Claude Rouget	G. Augustin-Normand	2:06.8
2010	Lope de Vega	Maxime Guyon	André Fabre	Gestüt Ammerland	2:07.1
2011	Reliable Man	Gérald Mossé	Alain de Royer-Dupré	Pride Racing Club	2:07.7
2012	Saonois	Antoine Hamelin	Jean-Pierre Gauvin	Pascal Trevye	2:08.1
2013	Intello	Olivier Peslier	André Fabre	Wertheimer et Frère	2:07.89
2014	The Grey Gatsby	Ryan Moore	Kevin Ryan	Frank Gillespie	2:05.58
2015	New Bay	Vincent Cheminaud	André Fabre	Khalid Abdullah	2:05.69
2016	Almanzor	Jean-Bernard Eyquem	Jean-Claude Rouget	Caro & Augustin-Normand	2:11.62
2017	Brametot	Cristian Demuro	Jean-Claude Rouget	Al Shaqab / Augustin-Normand	2:06.51
2018	Study of Man	Stéphane Pasquier	Pascal Bary	Flaxman Stables Ireland	2:07.44
2019	Sottsass	Cristian Demuro	Jean-Claude Rouget	White Birch Farm	2:02.90
2020	Mishriff (Note: The 2020 race took place in July due to the COVID-19 pandemic in France)	Ioritz Mendizabal	John Gosden	A A Faisal	2:04.01
2021	St Mark's Basilica	Ioritz Mendizabal	Aidan O'Brien	Smith / Magnier / Tabor	2:07.30
2022	Vadeni	Christophe Soumillon	Jean-Claude Rouget	HH Aga Khan IV	2:06.65
2023	Ace Impact	Cristian Demuro	Jean-Claude Rouget	Serge Stempniak	2:02.63
2024	Look de Vega	Ronan Thomas	Carlos & Yann Lerner	Haras De La Morsangliere	2:09.81
2025	Camille Pissarro	Ryan Moore	Aidan O'Brien	Tabor, Smith, Magnier & Brant	2:04.40
2026	Constitution River	Ryan Moore	Aidan O'Brien	Tabor, Smith, Magnier & Westerberg	2:03.52

== Earlier winners ==
- 1836: Franck
- 1837: Lydia
- 1838: Vendredi
- 1839: Romulus
- 1840: Tontine
- 1841: Poetess
- 1842: Plover
- 1843: Renonce ^{1}
- 1844: Lanterne
- 1845: Fitz Emilius
- 1846: Meudon
- 1847: Morok
- 1848: Gambetti
- 1849: Experience
- 1850: Saint Germain
- 1851: Amalfi
- 1852: Porthos
- 1853: Jouvence
- 1854: Celebrity
- 1855: Monarque
- 1856: Lion ^{1}
- 1857: Potocki
- 1858: Ventre Saint Gris
- 1859: Black Prince
- 1860: Beauvais
- 1861: Gabrielle d'Estrees
- 1862: Souvenir
- 1863: La Toucques
- 1864: Bois Roussel
- 1865: Gontran
- 1866: Florentin
- 1867: Patricien
- 1868: Suzerain
- 1869: Consul
- 1870: Bigarreau
- 1871: no race
- 1872: Revigny
- 1873: Boiard
- 1874: Saltarelle
- 1875: Salvator
- 1876: Kilt
- 1877: Jongleur
- 1878: Insulaire
- 1879: Zut
- 1880: Beauminet
- 1881: Albion IV
- 1882: Dandin / Saint James ^{2}
- 1883: Frontin
- 1884: Little Duck
- 1885: Reluisant
- 1886: Sycomore / Upas ^{2}
- 1887: Monarque II
- 1888: Stuart
- 1889: Clover
- 1890: Heaume
- 1891: Ermak
- 1892: Chene Royal
- 1893: Ragotsky
- 1894: Gospodar
- 1895: Omnium II
- 1896: Champaubert
- 1897: Palmiste
- 1898: Gardefeu
- 1899: Perth
- 1900: La Moriniere
- 1901: Saxon
- 1902: Retz
- 1903: Ex Voto
- 1904: Ajax
- 1905: Finasseur
- 1906: Maintenon
- 1907: Mordant
- 1908: Quintette / Sea Sick ^{2}
- 1909: Negofol
- 1910: Or du Rhin
- 1911: Alcantara
- 1912: Friant
- 1913: Dagor
- 1914: Sardanapale
- 1915: no race
- 1916: Teddy
- 1917: Brumelli
- 1918: Montmartin
- 1919: Tchad
- 1920: Sourbier
- 1921: Ksar
- 1922: Ramus
- 1923: Le Capucin
- 1924: Pot au Feu
- 1925: Belfonds
- 1926: Madrigal
- 1927: Mon Talisman
- 1928: Le Correge
- 1929: Hotweed
- 1930: Chateau Bouscaut
- 1931: Tourbillon
- 1932: Strip the Willow
- 1933: Thor
- 1934: Duplex
- 1935: Pearlweed
- 1936: Mieuxce
- 1937: Clairvoyant
- 1938: Cillas
- 1939: Pharis
- 1940: Quicko
- 1941: Le Pacha
- 1942: Magister
- 1943: Verso II
- 1944: Ardan
- 1945: Coaraze
- 1946: Prince Chevalier
- 1947: Sandjar
- 1948: Bey
- 1949: Good Luck

^{1} The 1843 and 1856 races finished as dead-heats, but each was decided by a run-off.
^{2} The 1882, 1886 and 1908 races were dead-heats and have joint winners.

== See also ==
- List of French flat horse races
