= Prix Daphnis =

Flat horse race in France

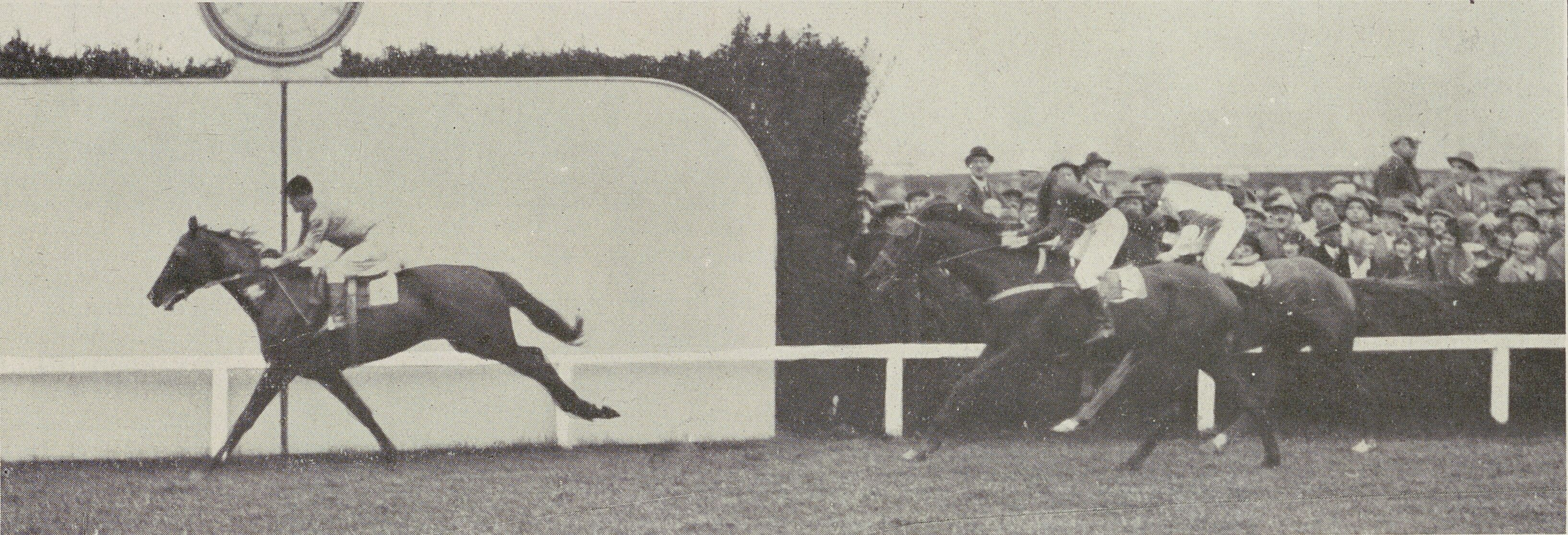
- 1930 winner Bull Dog.
- Class: Group 3
- Location: Deauville Racecourse; Deauville, France
- Inaugurated: 1921
- Race type: Flat / Thoroughbred
- Website: france-galop.com

Race information
- Distance: 1,600 metres (1m)
- Surface: Turf
- Track: Right-handed
- Qualification: Three-year-olds excluding Group 1 / 2 winners
- Weight: 57 kg Penalties1½ kg for Group 3 winners this year
- Purse: €80,000 (2021); 1st: €40,000

Prix Daphnis
2025
Sahlan	Ciaran	Silius

Previous years
2024
Ramadan	Ghorgan	Supercooled
2023
Brave Emperor	Sosino	Colombier
2022
Checkandchallenge	Facteur Cheval	Oscula
2021
Bellharbour Music	Partenit	Djo Francais

2020-2011
2020
Thorin	Tammani	Kenway
2019
Delaware	Dave	Paramount
2018
Glorious Journey	Sacred Life	First Contact
2017
Last Kingdom	Spotify	Neguev
2016
Taareef	George Patton	Maximum Aurelius
2015
Almanaar	Mostaneer	Inordinate
2014
Master Carpenter	Calling Out	Mr Pommeroy
2013
Superplex	Pilote	Noble De Man
2012
So Beautiful	Mainsail	Abtaal
2011
Cheers Joy	Valiyr	Absolutly Yes

2010–2001
2010
Emerald Commander	Wealthy	Mellon Martini
2009
Golden Century	Allybar	Guest Ville
2008
Indian Daffodil	In Chambers	Farrel
2007
Loup Breton	Bleu Intense	Tian Shan
2006
Viva Macau	Champs Elysees	Hello Sunday
2005
Pinson	Melanosporum	Kendor Dine
2004
Cacique	Ershaad	Apeiron
2003
Lateen Sails	Shakis	Streamix
2002
Bernebeau	Cielago	Mineshaft
2001
Kouroun	Red Snake	Monos

2000–1990
2000
Boutron	Crystal D'Ass	Special Ring
1999
Alrassaam	Val Royal	The Mask
1998
Kabool	Central Lobby	Front Bench
1997
Handsome Ridge	Aneysar	Blasket Island
1996
Regal Archive	Brindle	Anziyan
1995
Silent Warrior	Sharpest Image	Shannjar
1994
Signe Divin	Kaldounevees	Hyderabad
1993
Astair	Emperor Jones	Fastness
1992
Steinbeck	Rainbow Corner	Stubass
1991
Tel Quel	Bistro Garden	Funny Baby
1990
Candy Glen	Eightsome	Tarvisio

The Prix Daphnis is a Group 3 flat horse race in France open to three-year-old thoroughbreds. It is run at Deauville over a distance of 1,600 metres (about 1 mile), and it is scheduled to take place each year in August.

== History ==
The event was established for colts and geldings in 1921 alongside the Prix Chloé, a similar contest for fillies. The two races were named after the characters Daphnis and Chloe from a work by the Greek novelist Longus. The story was popularised in France by the translation of Paul-Louis Courier. Both races were originally held at Le Tremblay, and they usually took place in late April or early May.

The Prix Daphnis was initially contested over 1,600 metres. It served as a trial for the Poule d'Essai des Poulains. It was staged at Longchamp from 1940 to 1942, and returned to Le Tremblay in 1943.

The event was rescheduled to take place on the eve of the Poule d'Essai des Poulains in 1961. From this point its distance was 1,800 metres. Le Tremblay closed in 1967, and the race moved to Longchamp the following year. It was transferred to Évry in 1973, and switched to July in 1977.

With the exception of a single running at Longchamp in 1981, the Prix Daphnis remained at Évry until 1995. For periods thereafter it was held at Maisons-Laffitte (1996–98, 2002–03) and Chantilly (1999–2001, 2004).

The race returned to Longchamp in 2005. It was extended to 1,850 metres in 2010. It was run at Compiègne in 2013 and Chantilly again in 2014. Longchamp closed for redevelopment in October 2015 and the race was run at Chantilly in 2016 and Maisons-Laffitte in 2017. In 2018 the Prix Daphnis underwent major changes, being opened to fillies, transferred to Deauville's August meeting and reduced to 1,600 metres again.

== Records ==
Leading jockey (5 wins):

- Thierry Jarnet – Tel Quel (1991), Steinbeck (1992), Kouroun (2001), So Beautiful (2012), Almanaar (2015)

Leading trainer (10 wins):

- André Fabre – Thrill Show (1986), Tel Quel (1991), Steinbeck (1992), Signe Divin (1994), Alrassaam (1999), Bernebeau (2002), Cacique (2004), Golden Century (2009), Last Kingdom (2017), Delaware (2019)

Leading owner (7 wins):

- Marcel Boussac – Grazing (1921, dead-heat), Nosca (1942), Coaraze (1945), Djelal (1947), Galcador (1950), Faublas (1953), Alvedas (1973)

== Winners since 1978 ==
Year	Winner	Jockey	Trainer	Owner	Time
1978	Rusticaro	Maurice Philipperon	Richard Carver Jr.	Ferdinand Beghin
1979	Bellypha	Jackie Taillard	Alec Head	Jacques Wertheimer
1980	Huguenot	Yves Saint-Martin	Vincent O'Brien	Robert Sangster
1981	Dunphy	Freddy Head	Criquette Head	Ghislaine Head
1982	General Holme	Alain Lequeux	Olivier Douieb	Dan Lasater
1983	Glenstal	Yves Saint-Martin	Vincent O'Brien	Robert Sangster
1984	Palace Music	Éric Legrix	Patrick Biancone	Bruce McNall	1:50.90
1985	L'Irresponsable	Cash Asmussen	François Boutin	Stavros Niarchos
1986	Thrill Show	Alfred Gibert	André Fabre	Richard Winn	1:54.10
1987	Groom Dancer	Dominique Boeuf	Tony Clout	Marvin Warner	1:52.84
1988	Bricassar	Tony Cruz	Pascal Bary	Jean-Louis Bouchard
1989	Tartas	Guy Guignard	Noël Pelat	Constantin Boikos	1:50.16
1990	Candy Glen	Tony Cruz	Chris Wall	Antonio Balzarini	1:54.73
1991	Tel Quel	Thierry Jarnet	André Fabre	Sheikh Mohammed	1:50.51
1992	Steinbeck	theirry Jarnet	André Fabre	Sheikh Mohammed	1:51.43
1993	Astair	Gérald Mossé	Alain de Royer-Dupré	Marquesa de Moratalla	1:48.40
1994	Signe Divin	Sylvain Guillot	André Fabre	Paul de Moussac	1:48.71
1995	Silent Warrior	Cash Asmussen	John Hammond	Stavros Niarchos	1:50.57
1996	Regal Archive	Cash Asmussen	Peter Chapple-Hyam	Lucy Sangster	1:52.30
1997	Handsome Ridge	Sylvain Guillot	John Gosden	Platt Promotions Ltd	1:53.50
1998	Kabool	Gérald Mossé	Nicolas Clément	Maktoum Al Maktoum	1:52.50
1999	Alrassaam	Philip Robinson	Michael Jarvis	Ahmed Al Maktoum	1:48.90
2000	Boutron	Alain Junk	Pierre Costes	Gary Tanaka	1:54.50
2001	Kouroun	Thierry Jarnet	Jean-Marie Béguigné	Henri de la Chauvelais	1:51.50
2002	Bernebeau	Olivier Peslier	André Fabre	Sheikh Mohammed	1:54.40
2003	Lateen Sails	Frankie Dettori	Saeed bin Suroor	Godolphin	1:58.20
2004	Cacique	Gary Stevens	André Fabre	Khalid Abdullah	1:54.90
2005	Pinson	Stéphane Pasquier	Jean-Claude Rouget	Guy de Rothschild	1:50.80
2006	Dilek ^{[a]}	Christophe Soumillon	Alain de Royer-Dupré	HH Aga Khan IV	1:55.70
2007	Loup Breton	Christophe Lemaire	Élie Lellouche	Ecurie Wildenstein	1:51.10
2008	Indian Daffodil	Christophe Lemaire	Jean-Claude Rouget	Edouard de Rothschild	1:49.70
2009	Golden Century	Maxime Guyon	André Fabre	Sheikh Mohammed	1:52.20
2010	Emerald Commander	Frankie Dettori	Saeed bin Suroor	Godolphin	2:00.72
2011	Ziyarid ^{[b]}	Michael Poirier	Alain de Royer-Dupré	HH Aga Khan IV	1:53.04
2012	So Beautiful	Thierry Jarnet	Sandrine Tarrou	Sandrine Tarrou	1:57.19
2013	Superplex	Mirco Demuro	Michael Figge	Stall Eivissa	1:55.36
2014	Master Carpenter	Christophe Soumillon	Rod Millman	Links / Cheveley Park	1:54.37
2015	Almanaar	Thierry Jarnet	Freddy Head	Hamdan Al Maktoum	1:48.89
2016	Taareef	Ioritz Mendizabal	Jean-Claude Rouget	Hamdan Al Maktoum	1:55.48
2017	Last Kingdom	Silvestre de Sousa	André Fabre	Prince A A Faisal	1:58.62
2018	Glorious Journey	William Buick	Charlie Appleby	Sheikha Al Jalila Racing	1:44.11
2019	Delaware	Vincent Cheminaud	André Fabre	Khalid Abdullah	1:45.56
2020	Thorin	Andrasch Starke	Henk Grewe	Rennstall Gestut Hachtsee	1:44.27
2021	Bellharbour Music	Ioritz Mendizabal	Alessandro and Giuseppe Botti	Haras Du Logis Saint Germain	1:45.60
2022	Checkandchallenge	Christophe Soumillon	William Knight	A Hetherton	1:41.62
2023	Brave Emperor	Luke Morris	Archie Watson	Middleham Park Racing	1:43.04
2024	Ramadan	Aurelien Lemaitre	Christopher Head	Nurlan Bizakov	1:42.79
2025	Sahlan	Mickael Barzalona	Francis-Henri Graffard	Al Shaqab Racing	1:37.96
2026	Distant Storm	Billy Loughnane	Charlie Appleby	Godolphin	1:39.41

^{a} The 2006 winner Dilek was later exported to Hong Kong and renamed Viva Macau.
^{b} The 2011 winner Ziyarid subsequently raced in Hong Kong as Cheers Joy.

== Earlier winners ==
- 1921: Grazing / Net *
- 1922: Joyeux Drille
- 1923: Sir Gallahad
- 1924: Optimist
- 1925: Aethelstan
- 1926: Bad Leg
- 1927: Licteur
- 1928: Orosmade
- 1929: Argonaute
- 1930: Bull Dog
- 1931: Ivan le Terrible
- 1932: Ronflon
- 1933: Jumbo
- 1934: Shining Tor
- 1935: Comilon
- 1936: Ambrose Light
- 1937: Drap d'Or
- 1938: Tranquil
- 1939: Mac Kann
- 1940: Flying Call
- 1941: Pampre d'Or
- 1942: Nosca
- 1943: Fanatique
- 1944: Tango
- 1945: Coaraze
- 1946: Sayani
- 1947: Djelal
- 1948:
- 1949: Oghio
- 1950: Galcador
- 1951: Free Man
- 1952: Faubourg
- 1953: Faublas
- 1954:
- 1955: Belebat
- 1956: Polic
- 1957: Mourne
- 1958: Pres du Feu
- 1959: Savarus
- 1960: Djebel Traffic
- 1961:
- 1962: Montfleur
- 1963: Garde Coeur
- 1964: Sigebert
- 1965: Sunday
- 1966: Silver Shark
- 1967: Blue Tom
- 1968: Chimist Amber
- 1969: Bergano
- 1970: Larko
- 1971: Maroun
- 1972: Tom Playfair
- 1973: Alvedas
- 1974: Schoeller
- 1975: Wronsky
- 1976: Happy New Year
- 1977: Solicitor

* The 1921 race was a dead-heat and has joint winners.

== See also ==
- List of French flat horse races
