= Pharis (horse) =

French-bred Thoroughbred racehorse

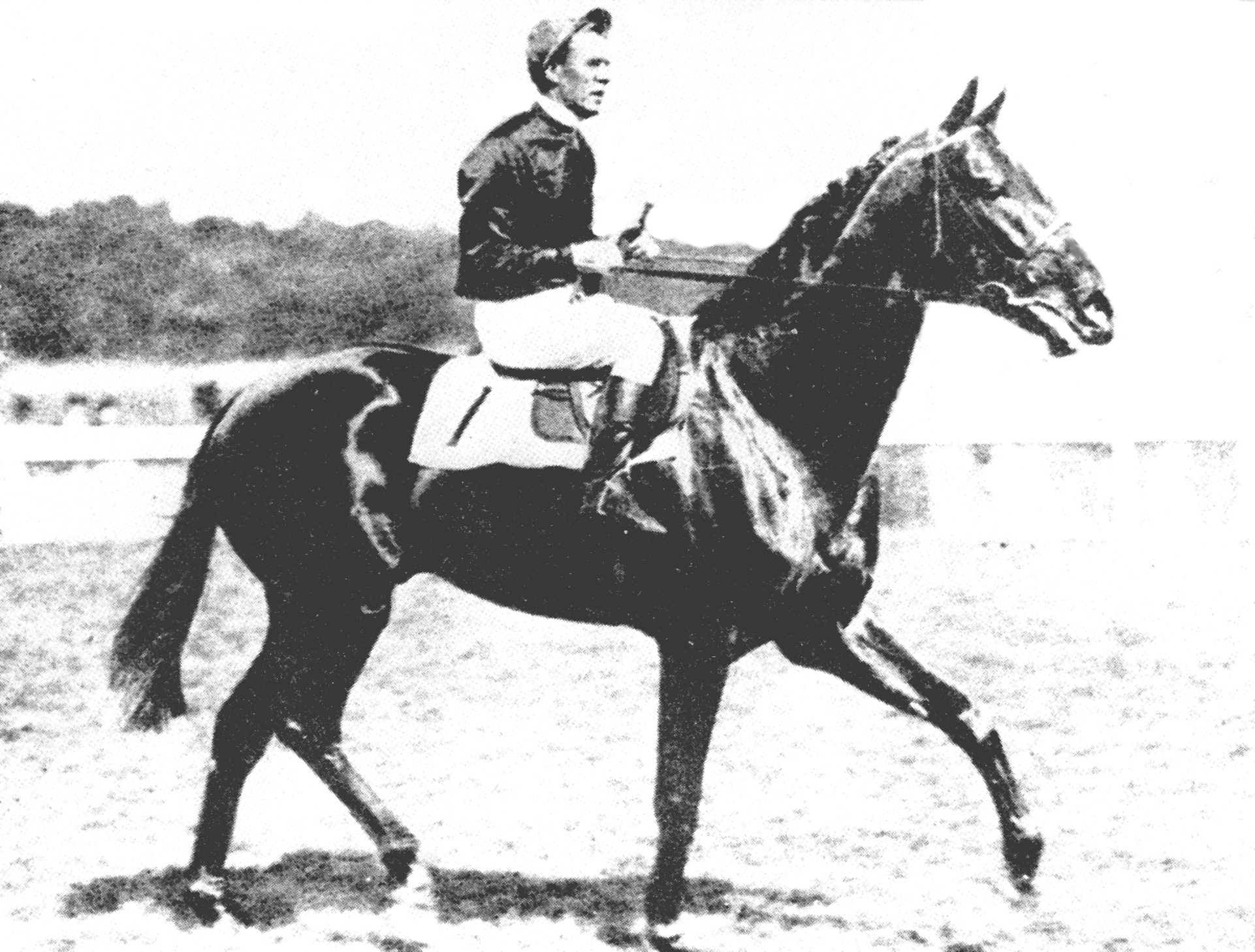
- Sire: Pharos
- Grandsire: Phalaris
- Dam: Carissima
- Damsire: Clarissimus
- Sex: Stallion
- Foaled: 1936
- Country: France
- Colour: Black
- Breeder: Haras de Fresnay-le-Buffard
- Owner: Marcel Boussac
- Trainer: Albert Swann
- Record: 3: 3-0-0
- Earnings: 1,893,675 FF

Major wins
- Prix Noailles (1939); Prix du Jockey Club (1939); Grand Prix de Paris (1939)

Awards
- Leading sire in France (1944)
- Last updated on 24 August 2009

Pharis (1936–1957) was a French Thoroughbred racehorse who is "considered one of the greatest French-bred runners of the century," according to Thoroughbred Heritage. Named for the Spartan town of Pharis, he was owned and bred by leading French entrepreneur and thoroughbred race horse breeder, Marcel Boussac.

== Breeding ==
Pharis was sired by Pharos who also sired "one of the greatest racehorses of the Twentieth Century," Nearco, from Carissima (three wins, second in French Oaks and dam of seven other winners) by Clarissimus.

== Racing record ==
Conditioned by English trainer Albert Swann, Pharis was sent to the track at age three. Ridden by English jockey Charlie Elliott, Pharis won all three races entered including the then most prestigious race in France, the Grand Prix de Paris. His 1939 performances were such that a match race was being organized against Blue Peter, winner of England's 2,000 Guineas and Epsom Derby. However, on 3 September World War II broke out and Pharis would never race again.

== Stud record ==
Pharis stood at stud at his owner's Haras de Fresnay-le-Buffard in Neuvy-au-Houlme in Orne where he notably sired Ardan in 1940 and whose 1944 performances would be the basis for Pharis earning that year's Leading sire in France title. However, following the German occupation of France the Nazis seized some of the best racehorses in the country including Pharis who was shipped to Germany to be used for breeding at the German National Stud. Following the end of the War in 1945, Pharis was recovered by his owner and returned to stud duty at Haras de Fresnay-le-Buffard.

Pharis was a very important and influential sire, producing at least 37 stakeswinners with 56 conditions race wins. In addition to Ardan, who won the 1944 Prix de l'Arc de Triomphe, other offspring of Pharis include Palencia, Scratch, Philius, Talma and Corejada.

Sons, Ardan, Priam (10 wins and sire) and Cortil were exported to the US; Scratch went to Argentina; Brazil imported six sons, at least three stallions went to South Africa, Talma went to Peru, Damtar was in Australia, Gabador in New Zealand and other sons went to England, Columbia, Italy and Germany.

Pharis died on 27 February 1957.

== Pedigree ==
Pedigree of Pharis (FR), brown or black stallion, 1936
| Sire Pharos B. 1920 | Phalaris; Br. 1913 | Polymelus | Cyllene |
| Sire Pharos B. 1920 | Phalaris; Br. 1913 | Polymelus | Maid Marian |
| Sire Pharos B. 1920 | Phalaris; Br. 1913 | Bromus | Sainfoin |
| Sire Pharos B. 1920 | Phalaris; Br. 1913 | Bromus | Cheery |
| Sire Pharos B. 1920 | Scapa Flow; 1914 | Chaucer | St. Simon |
| Sire Pharos B. 1920 | Scapa Flow; 1914 | Chaucer | Canterbury Pilgrim |
| Sire Pharos B. 1920 | Scapa Flow; 1914 | Anchora | Love Wisely |
| Sire Pharos B. 1920 | Scapa Flow; 1914 | Anchora | Elyholme |
| Dam Carissima B. 1923 | Clarissimus; 1913 | Radium | Bend Or |
| Dam Carissima B. 1923 | Clarissimus; 1913 | Radium | Taia |
| Dam Carissima B. 1923 | Clarissimus; 1913 | Quintessence | St. Frusquin |
| Dam Carissima B. 1923 | Clarissimus; 1913 | Quintessence | Margarine |
| Dam Carissima B. 1923 | Casquetts; 1913 | Captivation | Cyllene |
| Dam Carissima B. 1923 | Casquetts; 1913 | Captivation | Cassis |
| Dam Carissima B. 1923 | Casquetts; 1913 | Charm | Morion |
| Dam Carissima B. 1923 | Casquetts; 1913 | Charm | Domiduca (Family: 20-a) |

== See also ==
- List of leading Thoroughbred racehorses
