= Baldric (horse) =

American-bred Thoroughbred racehorse

- Sire: Round Table
- Grandsire: Princequillo
- Dam: Two Cities
- Damsire: Johnstown
- Sex: Stallion
- Foaled: 16 May 1961
- Country: United States
- Colour: Bay
- Breeder: Bull Run Stud (Howell E. Jackson and Dorothy Jackson)
- Owner: Dorothy Jackson
- Trainer: Ernest Fellows
- Record: 11:4-5-0
- Earnings: £71,029 (in Britain)

Major wins
- 2000 Guineas (1964); Prix Perth (1964); Champion Stakes (1964)

Awards
- Timeform rating 131

Baldric (16 May 1961 – 26 August 1986) was an American-bred, French-trained Thoroughbred racehorse and sire, best known for winning the classic 2000 Guineas in 1964. When racing in Britain, the horse was known as Baldric II. Baldric won twice in 1963 but after being beaten on his three-year-old debut he started a 20/1 outsider for the 2000 Guineas. He won the race, the most valuable ever run in Britain, and went on to win the Prix Perth and the Champion Stakes in Autumn. After two unsuccessful runs in 1965, Baldric was retired to stud where he had success as a sire of winners in both France and Japan.

== Background ==
Baldric was a bay horse with no white markings bred in Kentucky by Howell E. Jackson and Dorothy Jackson's Bull Run Farm. As a two-year-old he was sent to race in Europe where he was trained by the Australian-born Ernie Fellows at Chantilly in France and raced in Dorothy Jackson's colours. His sire, Round Table was one of the most successful grass specialists in American racing history, winning forty-three races and being named Horse of the Year in 1958. He became a highly successful breeding stallion, being the Leading sire in North America in 1972. Baldric's dam Two Cities won one minor race but became a successful broodmare, producing several other winners including the double Pimlico Cup winner Cross Channel. As a descendant of the broodmare Valkyr, Two Cities came from the branch of Thoroughbred family 13-c which produced Black Tarquin and Ferdinand.

== Racing career ==
=== 1963:two-year-old season ===
As a two-year-old, Baldric won two races including the Prix Tramp at Le Tremblay. He was moved up in class to contest the Prix de la Salamandre over 1400 metres and finished second to the British-bred Kirkland Lake. On his final appearance he finished unplaced in the Grand Critérium at Longchamp Racecourse, having failed to settle for his jockey in the early stages. During his first season, Baldric demonstrated an unruly temperament and was equipped with blinkers by his trainer, who described him as a "crazy" colt.

=== 1964:three-year-old season ===
On his first appearance of 1964, Baldric dead-heated for second behind Takawalk in the Prix Djebel at Maisons-Laffitte Racecourse. The colt was then sent to race in Britain for the first time when he contested the 2000 Guineas over the Rowley Mile course at Newmarket. The prize money of all five of the British Classic Races was raised significantly in 1964, and the Guineas was worth £40,302, making it the most valuable race run in Britain up to that time. Ridden by Australian jockey Bill Pyers, he was not considered a serious contender and started at odds of 20/1 in a field of twenty-seven runners. Baldric took the lead a furlong from the finish and won by two lengths from Faberge, becoming the fifth successive foreign-trained winner of a British classic.

He was then moved up in distance for the Derby over one and a half miles at Epsom Downs Racecourse. On this occasion, he arrived from France with his own supply of sterilized water, with his assistant trainer explaining that "he doesn't like English water". In contrast to his reputation for unruliness acquired as a two-year-old, Baldric was now being praised in the British press as "a game, resolute colt, full of quality" and one of the few horses capable of defeating the Irish favourite, Santa Claus. Starting at 9/1, he took the lead in the straight and tired in the closing stages to finish fifth of the seventeen runners behind Santa Claus. On 5 July, Baldric was back in England again for the Eclipse Stakes over ten furlongs at Sandown Park in which he was matched against older horses and finished runner-up to the four-year-old Ragusa.

For his remaining two races of 1964, Baldric was again equipped with blinkers. In late September, he won the Prix Perth over 1600 metres Saint-Cloud Racecourse. A month later, he ended his season by taking on an international field in the ten-furlong Champion Stakes at Newmarket. He started at 7/2 and was ridden by Pyers to a one-length victory from the four-year-old favourite Linacre, winner of the Irish 2000 Guineas and Queen Elizabeth II Stakes.

The successes of Baldric, together with Nasram's defeat of Santa Claus in the King George VI and Queen Elizabeth Stakes, made Dorothy Jackson the British flat racing Champion Owner in 1964.

=== 1965:four-year-old season ===
Baldric ran twice as a four-year-old, but failed to recover his best form, as he became increasingly temperamental and difficult to train.

== Assessment ==
The independent Timeform organisation assigned Baldric a peak rating of 131 in 1964. In their book A Century of Champions, based on a modified version of the Timeform system, John Randall and Tony Morris rated Baldric an "average" winner of the 2000 Guineas.

== Stud record ==
Baldric began his stud career in France before being sold and exported to Japan in 1973. The best of his European offspring included the Irish Derby winner Irish Ball and the Irish 1000 Guineas winner Favoletta. He also sired Without Fear (out of Never Too Late) who became a leading sire in Australia. In Japan he sired Kyoei Promise who won the Autumn Tenno Sho and finished second in the Japan Cup in 1983. Baldric died in Japan on 26 August 1986.

== Pedigree ==
Pedigree of Baldric (USA), bay stallion, 1961
Sire Round Table (USA) 1954	Princequillo (IRE); 1940	Prince Rose	Rose Prince
Sire Round Table (USA) 1954	Princequillo (IRE); 1940	Prince Rose	Indolence
Sire Round Table (USA) 1954	Princequillo (IRE); 1940	Cosquilla	Papyrus
Sire Round Table (USA) 1954	Princequillo (IRE); 1940	Cosquilla	Quick Thought
Sire Round Table (USA) 1954	Knight's Daughter (GB); 1941	Sir Cosmo	The Boss
Sire Round Table (USA) 1954	Knight's Daughter (GB); 1941	Sir Cosmo	Ayn Hali
Sire Round Table (USA) 1954	Knight's Daughter (GB); 1941	Feola	Friar Marcus
Sire Round Table (USA) 1954	Knight's Daughter (GB); 1941	Feola	Aloe
Dam Two Cities (USA) 1948	Johnstown (USA); 1936	Jamestown	St James
Dam Two Cities (USA) 1948	Johnstown (USA); 1936	Jamestown	Mlle Dazie
Dam Two Cities (USA) 1948	Johnstown (USA); 1936	La France	Sir Gallahad*
Dam Two Cities (USA) 1948	Johnstown (USA); 1936	La France	Flambette
Dam Two Cities (USA) 1948	Vienna (USA); 1941	Menow	Pharamond
Dam Two Cities (USA) 1948	Vienna (USA); 1941	Menow	Alcibiades
Dam Two Cities (USA) 1948	Vienna (USA); 1941	Valse	Sir Gallahad*
Dam Two Cities (USA) 1948	Vienna (USA); 1941	Valse	Valkyr (Family 13-c)

* Baldric is inbred 4D x 4D to the stallion Sir Gallahad, meaning that he appears fourth generation twice on the dam side of his pedigree.
