= Marcel Boussac =

French businessman (1889–1980)

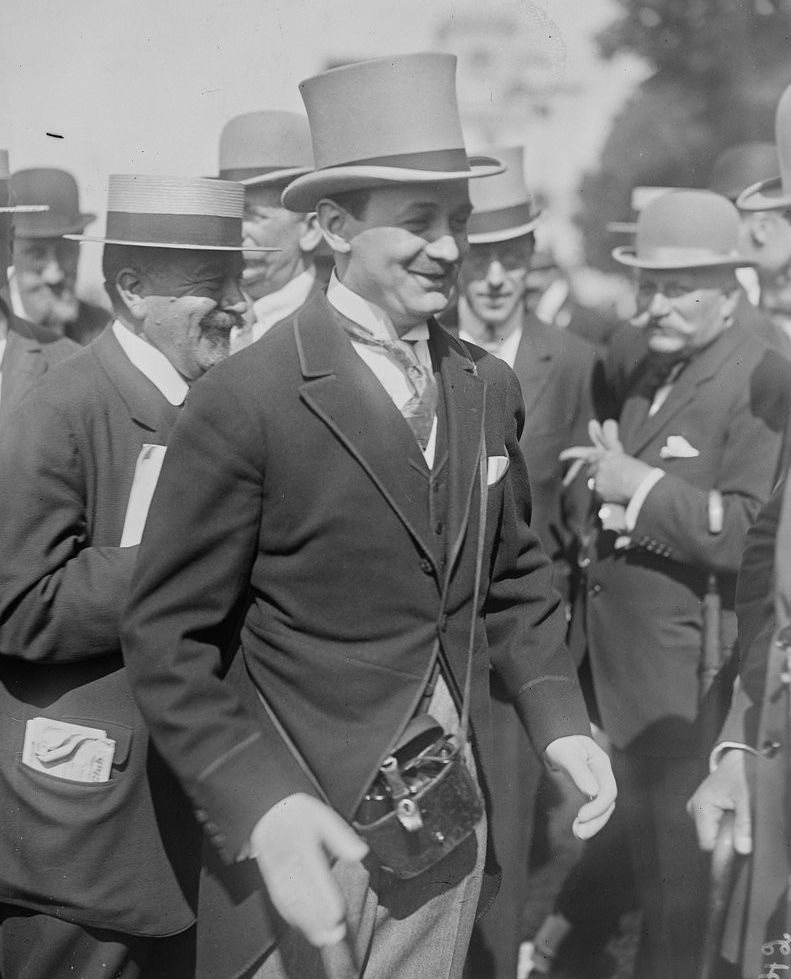
- Born: 17 April 1889; Châteauroux, France
- Died: 21 March 1980 (aged 90); Paris, France
- Occupations: Businessman: Perfume manufacturing Newspaper publishing Racehorse owner/breeder
- Spouse: Fanny Heldy

Marcel Boussac (17 April 1889 – 21 March 1980) was a French entrepreneur best known for his ownership of the Maison Dior and one of the most successful thoroughbred race horse breeding farms in European history.

Born in Châteauroux, Indre, France, Boussac made a fortune in textile manufacturing. In 1911 he acquired the Château de Mivoisin, a 36 square kilometre property located 1½ hours south of Paris in Dammarie-sur-Loing, Loiret.

In 1941, Boussac was made a member of the National Council of Vichy France.

In 1946, he financed Christian Dior's new Paris fashion house that became one of the most famous clothing and perfume marques. In 1951 Boussac expanded into the newspaper business with the acquisition of L'Aurore.

An avid horseman, Marcel Boussac acquired the Haras de Fresnay-le-Buffard horse breeding farm in Neuvy-au-Houlme in Lower Normandy and the Haras de Jardy in Marnes-la-Coquette. As part of his breeding operation, Boussac bought and sold horses from across Europe as well as from the United States. He acquired the U.S. Triple Crown winner Whirlaway and sold the mare La Troienne to Edward R. Bradley's Idle Hour Stock Farm in Lexington, Kentucky, who became one of the most influential mares to be imported into the U.S. in the 20th century.

Boussac's horses, carrying Boussac's signature orange silk and grey cap, dominated French horse racing from the 1930s through to the 1960s, making his stable the leading money winner fourteen times and the leading breeder on seventeen occasions. In addition to being a six-time winner of France's most important race, the Prix de l'Arc de Triomphe, Boussac's horses also won the prestigious Epsom Derby, Epsom Oaks, 2,000 Guineas, St. Leger Stakes, Ascot Gold Cup and others in the United Kingdom.

Marcel Boussac's signature colours : Orange, grey cap

With the Fall of France in the Second World War, Boussac paid a British Royal Air Force officer on secret business to fly him from Paris to the UK. This resulted in the officer Sidney Cotton being removed from his position and banned from any involvement with air operations. During the German occupation of France in World War II, the Nazis seized some of the best racehorses in the country. They shipped more than six hundred of them out of the country, some to Hungary but most back to Germany for racing or for breeding at the German National Stud. Among them was the champion Pharis, owned by Marcel Boussac.

He was married for many years to the Belgian opera singer Fanny Heldy. They are buried together in the Cimetière de Montmartre in the Montmartre Quarter of Paris.

On his death in 1980, Boussac's estate was liquidated and L'Aurore sold to Robert Hersant who merged it with his Le Figaro newspaper. The property itself would eventually be acquired by Stavros Niarchos. The Aga Khan IV had purchased the bulk of the Boussac farm's breeding stock in 1978 when Boussac's companies were declared bankrupt.

In his honor, the Prix Marcel Boussac, a Group One Stakes Race, is run annually at the Longchamp Racecourse.
