= More So =

Irish-bred Thoroughbred racehorse

- Sire: Ballymore
- Grandsire: Ragusa
- Dam: Demare
- Damsire: Pardao
- Sex: Mare
- Foaled: 1 May 1975
- Country: Ireland
- Colour: Brown
- Breeder: G Spann
- Owner: Joan Gelb; Nelson Bunker Hunt
- Trainer: Paddy Prendergast; Charles E. Whittingham
- Record: 29: 6-2-1

Major wins
- Irish 1000 Guineas (1978); Desmond Stakes (1978); Palomar Handicap (1979)

Awards
- Timeform rating 106p (1977), 117 (1978)

More So (1 May 1975 – after 1990) was an Irish Thoroughbred racehorse and broodmare. She showed considerable promise when winning her only start as a juvenile in 1977 and then took the Irish 1000 Guineas on her three-year-old debut. She won the Desmond Stakes later that year before being exported to the United States where she won the Palomar Handicap in 1979. Her subsequent North American career was disappointing and she was retired from racing at the end of the 1980 season. She made no impact as a broodmare.

== Background ==
More So was a "lightly-made" brown mare with no white markings bred in Ireland by G Spann, who had bought her dam Demare for 3,000 guineas in late 1974 with More So in utero. Spann recouped his money at the Goffs Premier Yearling Sale in September 1976 when the filly was auctioned for 3,000 guineas. More So entered the ownership of Joan Gelb and was sent into training with Paddy Prendergast.

She was from the first crop of foals sired by Ballymore who won the 1972 running of the Irish 2000 Guineas on his racecourse debut and defeated Roberto at level weights in the Nijinsky Stakes. Demare failed to win a race although she was placed several times as a two-year-old in 1969. She was a granddaughter of the British broodmare Damians (foaled 1942), whose other descendants have included Oasis Dream, Wemyss Bight, Four-and-Twenty, Weavers' Hall, Zenda and Beat Hollow.

== Racing career ==
=== 1977: two-year-old season ===
More So made her racecourse debut in a seven furlong maiden race at the Curragh in September 1977. Starting at odds of 12/1 in a thirteen-runner field she won by three quarters of a length from the Vincent O'Brien-trained colt Encyclopedia.

=== 1978: three-year-old season ===
On her first appearance as a three-year-old More So was ridden by Christy Roche when she was one of 17 fillies to contest the Irish 1000 Guinea on good to firm ground at the Curragh on 12 May. Despite her lack of experience she was made the 2/1 joint favourite alongside Cistus, the only British-trained challenger who had won the Waterford Candelabra Stakes and finished second in the Critérium des Pouliches in the previous year. The best fancied of the other runners were Enid Calling (winner of the Tyros Stakes and Mulcahy Stakes), Quatemala (second in the Athasi Stakes) and Ridaness (Moyglare Stud Stakes). The race was run only a week after the English 1000 Guineas and Enid Calling (seventh to Enstone Spark at Newmarket) was the only filly to contest both races. After tracking the leaders, More So overtook Ridaness to gain the lead inside the final furlong and kept on well to win by one and a half lengths. Sorbus (later to be disquallifed after "winning" the Irish Oaks) finished strongly to take second by a short head from Ridaness with Sutton Place in fourth.

Shortly after her win at the Curragh the filly contracted a viral infection and missed an intended run in The Oaks reappearing in the Coronation Stakes at Royal Ascot later in June. She started favourite but looked outpaced and finished fifth, six lengths behind Sutton Place, who won by a short head from Ridaness. In late July she returned to Ireland and matched against male opposition in the Desmond Stakes over one mile at the Curragh. She won by two lengths from Ridaness with Strong Gale (runner-up to Jaazeiro in the Irish 2000 Guineas) four lengths back in third. At York Racecourse in August she was moved up in distance to contest the seventh running of the Benson and Hedges Gold Cup over ten and a half furlongs and finished fifth behind Hawaiian Sound. On her final start of the year she was made 5/2 third favourite for the Joe McGrath Memorial Stakes at Leopardstown Racecourse on 23 September but ran poorly and finished sixth of the seven runners behind Inkerman.

=== 1979 & 1980: North American racing career ===
Before the start of the 1979 season More So was bought privately by Nelson Bunker Hunt and was exported to the United States where she was trained by Charlie Whittingham. More So was unplaced in her first three American starts before finishing second in an allowance race at Hollywood Park Racetrack and then running third to Giggling Girl in the Beverly Hills Handicap at the same course on 1 July. She recorded her first win in the United States in an allowance at Hollywood Park two weeks later and followed up with a victory in the Palomar Handicap at Del Mar Racetrack on 11 August, beating Giggling Girl and Wishing Well. She finished second to Country Queen in the Ramona Handicap at Del Mar in September and was then stepped up to Grade I level and finished fifth in the Yellow Ribbon Stakes at Santa Anita Park on 3 November. She recorded her third win of the year when she took the Children's Hospital Handicap at Bay Meadows two week later and ended her season by finishing fourth in the California Jockey Club Handicap at the same track in December.

More So remained in training as a five-year-old in 1980 but did not recapture her best form and failed to win in twelve starts. Her only placed effort came on 31 July when she finished third in an allowance race at Del Mar.

== Assessment ==
In 1977 the independent Timeform organisation gave More So a rating of 106 p, the "p" indicated that she was likely to make more than usual progress. In their annual Racehorses of 1977 Timeform described her as being "sure to go on to better things". In the official International Classification of three-year-olds for 1978 she was given a rating of 80, eleven pounds behind the top-rated filly Swiss Maid. Timeform broadly concurred, making her twelve pounds inferior Swiss Maid on a rating of 117.

== Breeding record ==
More So was retired from racing to become a broodmare in the United States. At the dispersal of Nelson Bunker Hunt's bloodstock she was bought for $190,000 by the bloodstock agency Horse France. She produced five foals between 1983 and 1990:

- Mortakelly, a bay filly, foaled in 1983, sired by Exceller. Failed to win in two races.
- Power Oman, colt (later gelded), 1985, by Vaguely Noble
- Grindelia, bay filly, 1987, by Isopach. Unraced.
- Monaco Stenz, colt, 1988, by Vice Regent. Raced in France and Germany.
- My Lomond, brown colt, 1990, by Lomond. Unraced.

== Pedigree ==
Pedigree of More So, brown mare, 1975
Sire Ballymore (IRE) 1969	Ragusa (IRE); 1960	Ribot	Tenerani
Sire Ballymore (IRE) 1969	Ragusa (IRE); 1960	Ribot	Romanella
Sire Ballymore (IRE) 1969	Ragusa (IRE); 1960	Fantan	Ambiorix
Sire Ballymore (IRE) 1969	Ragusa (IRE); 1960	Fantan	Red Eye
Sire Ballymore (IRE) 1969	Paddys Sister (IRE); 1957	Ballyogan	Fair Trial
Sire Ballymore (IRE) 1969	Paddys Sister (IRE); 1957	Ballyogan	Serial
Sire Ballymore (IRE) 1969	Paddys Sister (IRE); 1957	Birthday Wood	Bois Roussel
Sire Ballymore (IRE) 1969	Paddys Sister (IRE); 1957	Birthday Wood	Birthday Bouquet
Dam Demare (GB) 1967	Pardao (GB); 1958	Pardal	Pharis
Dam Demare (GB) 1967	Pardao (GB); 1958	Pardal	Adargatis
Dam Demare (GB) 1967	Pardao (GB); 1958	Three Weeks	Big Game
Dam Demare (GB) 1967	Pardao (GB); 1958	Three Weeks	Eleanor Cross
Dam Demare (GB) 1967	Merdemain (GB); 1960	Tamerlane	Persian Gulf
Dam Demare (GB) 1967	Merdemain (GB); 1960	Tamerlane	Eastern Empress
Dam Demare (GB) 1967	Merdemain (GB); 1960	Damians	Panorama
Dam Demare (GB) 1967	Merdemain (GB); 1960	Damians	Thirteen (Family: 19)
