= Weavers' Hall =

Irish-bred Thoroughbred racehorse

- Sire: Busted
- Grandsire: Crepello
- Dam: Marians
- Damsire: Macherio
- Sex: Stallion
- Foaled: 1970
- Country: Ireland
- Colour: Bay
- Breeder: McGrath Trust Co
- Owner: Seamus McGrath
- Trainer: Seamus McGrath
- Record: 10: 2-3-1

Major wins
- Irish Derby (1973)

Awards
- Timeform rating 122 (1973)

Weavers' Hall (foaled 1970) was an Irish Thoroughbred racehorse and sire bast known for his upset win in the 1973 Irish Derby. Bred, owned and trained by Seamus McGrath he won one minor race from four starts in 1972. In 1973 he finished second three times in spring before winning the Irish Derby at odds of 33/1. He then finished fourth in the King George VI and Queen Elizabeth Stakes before his racing career was ended by injury.

== Background ==
Weavers' Hall was a "big, strong" bay horse with no white markings bred in Ireland by the McGrath Trust Company, a breeding organisation run by his owner and trainer Seamus McGrath. His sire Busted was the British Horse of the Year in 1967 and sired many other good middle-distance performers including Bustino and Mtoto.

Weavers' Hall was the second foal of his dam Marians who finished fourth in the Irish Oaks. She was a daughter of Damians, an influential and long-lived British broodmare whose other descendants have included Oasis Dream, Beat Hollow, More So, Zenda, Candy Glen (Premio Parioli), Wemyss Bight (Irish Oaks) and Ballydam (sire of Bally Ache)

== Racing career ==
=== 1972: two-year-old season ===
Weavers' Hall began his track career racing over six furlongs, finishing unplaced on his debut and running third in his next two races. He was then moved up in distance and won a maiden race over seven furlongs.

=== 1973: three-year-old season ===
Weavers' Hall began his second season by finishing second to Starboard Buoy over seven furlongs. He was then moved up in class and distance for the Nijinsky Stakes over ten furlongs at Leopardstown Racecourse in which he was matched against older horses. He finished fifth behind Ballymore who recorded an upset victory over the 1972 Epsom Derby winner Roberto. In the Lumville Stakes over one mile at the Curragh Racecourse in May he finished third behind the dead heaters Status Seeker and Boone's Cabin but was promoted to second when Boone's Cabin was disqualified. In the Players-Wills Stakes over ten furlongs at Leopardstown he finished second, beaten two lengths by the Vincent O'Brien-trained Hail The Pirates.

On 30 June, Weavers' Hall, ridden by George McGrath (no relation to the owner/trainer), contested the Irish Derby over one and a half miles at the Curragh and started a 33/1 outsider in a fifteen-runner field. Hail The Pirates started the 11/4 favourite whilst the other runners included Freefoot, Ksar and Ragapan (respectively third, fourth and fifth in the Epsom Derby) as well as Buoy, Natsun (Dee Stakes) and Laurentian Hills (Churchill Stakes). Park Lawn (also trained by McGrath) took the lead from the start and set an exceptionally strong pace from Buoy, Weavers' Hall and Laurentian Hills. Approaching the final turn Hail The Pirates began to make ground as Laurentian Hills and Park Lawn faded. Buoy took the lead in the straight but Weavers' Hall quickly gained the advantage and stayed on very strongly to win by two and a half lengths from Ragapan, with Buoy taking third ahead of Hail The Pirates and Ksar. After the race George McGrath said "we did not think he would do so well on fast ground, but once we hit the front I knew it would take a good horse to beat us".

On his only subsequent start Weavers' Hall was sent to Ascot Racecourse for Britains most prestigious weight-for-age race, the King George VI and Queen Elizabeth Stakes over one and a half miles. He was among the leaders from the start and stayed on well in the straight to finish fourth of the twelve runners behind Dahlia, Rheingold and Our Mirage.

In the autumn of 1973, Weavers' Hall was scheduled to run in the Prix Royal-Oak at Longchamp Racecourse in September. When being transported in a horse-box to the Curragh for a training session he sustained a severed artery and was retired from racing.

== Assessment ==
In the 1972 Irish Free Handicap, a ranking of the leading Irish two-year-olds, Weavers' Hall was assigned a weight of 110 pounds, thirty pounds behind the top-rated Thatch. In 1973 the independent Timeform organisation gave him a rating of 122, fourteen pounds behind Thatch, who was their top-rated three-year-old colt.

== Stud record ==
Weavers' Hall began his stud career at the Brownstown Stud, County Kildare at a fee of 2,000 guineas. The best of his offspring was probably El Badr who won the Prix du Cadran in 1979.

== Pedigree ==
Pedigree of Weavers' Hall (IRE) bay stallion 1970
Sire Busted (GB) 1963	Crepello (GB); 1954	Donatello	Bleheim
Sire Busted (GB) 1963	Crepello (GB); 1954	Donatello	Delleana
Sire Busted (GB) 1963	Crepello (GB); 1954	Crepuscule	Mieuxce
Sire Busted (GB) 1963	Crepello (GB); 1954	Crepuscule	Red Sunset
Sire Busted (GB) 1963	Sans le Sou (IRE); 1957	Vimy	Wild Risk
Sire Busted (GB) 1963	Sans le Sou (IRE); 1957	Vimy	Mimi
Sire Busted (GB) 1963	Sans le Sou (IRE); 1957	Martial Loan	Court Martial
Sire Busted (GB) 1963	Sans le Sou (IRE); 1957	Martial Loan	Loan
Dam Marians (GB) 1963	Macherio (ITY); 1941	Ortello	Teddy
Dam Marians (GB) 1963	Macherio (ITY); 1941	Ortello	Hollebeck
Dam Marians (GB) 1963	Macherio (ITY); 1941	Mannozza	Manna
Dam Marians (GB) 1963	Macherio (ITY); 1941	Mannozza	Moireen Rhue
Dam Marians (GB) 1963	Damians (IRE); 1942	Panorama	Sir Cosmo
Dam Marians (GB) 1963	Damians (IRE); 1942	Panorama	Happy Climax
Dam Marians (GB) 1963	Damians (IRE); 1942	Thirteen	Bulger
Dam Marians (GB) 1963	Damians (IRE); 1942	Thirteen	Credenda (Family 19)
