= 2003 Epsom Derby =

- Location: Epsom Downs Racecourse
- Date: 7 June 2003
- Winning horse: Kris Kin
- Starting price: 6/1
- Jockey: Kieren Fallon
- Trainer: Sir Michael Stoute
- Owner: Saeed Suhail

Epsom Derby 2003
1–2–3
Kris Kin	The Great Gatsby	Alamshar

Also Ran
4–5–6
Norse Dancer	Balestrini	Dutch Gold
7–8–9
Let Me Try Again	Graikos	Magistretti
10–11–12
Shield	Summerland	Alberto Giacometti
13–14–15
Refuse To Bend	Franklins Gardens	Dunhill Star
16–17–18
Brian Boru	Strength 'n Honour	Unigold
18 19
Lundy's Lane	Prince Nureyev	19 Ran

The 2003 Epsom Derby was a horse race which took place at Epsom Downs on Saturday 7 June 2003. It was the 224th running of the Derby, and it was won by Kris Kin. The winner was ridden by Kieren Fallon and trained by Sir Michael Stoute. The pre-race favourite Refuse To Bend finished thirteenth.

== Race details ==
- Sponsor: Vodafone
- Winner's prize money: £852,600
- Going: Good
- Number of runners: 20
- Winner's time: 2m 33.35s

== Full result ==
	*	Horse	Jockey	Trainer ^{†}	SP
1		Kris Kin	Kieren Fallon	Sir Michael Stoute	6/1
2	1	The Great Gatsby	Pat Eddery	Aidan O'Brien (IRE)	20/1
3	shd	Alamshar	Johnny Murtagh	John Oxx (IRE)	4/1
4	1½	Norse Dancer	Richard Quinn	David Elsworth	16/1
5	¾	Balestrini	Jamie Spencer	Aidan O'Brien (IRE)	66/1
6	4	Dutch Gold	Philip Robinson	Clive Brittain	20/1
7	4	Let Me Try Again	Darryll Holland	Terry Mills	50/1
8	1¼	Graikos	Frankie Dettori	Saeed bin Suroor	25/1
9	hd	Magistretti	Kevin Darley	Neville Callaghan	20/1
10	1	Shield	Eddie Ahern	Gerard Butler	20/1
11	½	Summerland	Jimmy Fortune	John Gosden	100/1
12	1¼	Alberto Giacometti	Christophe Soumillon	Aidan O'Brien (IRE)	12/1
13	½	Refuse To Bend	Pat Smullen	Dermot Weld (IRE)	11/4 fav
14	hd	Franklins Gardens	Ted Durcan	Mark Tompkins	25/1
15	2½	Dunhill Star	Michael Hills	Barry Hills	50/1
16	2	Brian Boru	Michael Kinane	Aidan O'Brien (IRE)	9/2
17	nk	Strength 'n Honour	Richard Hughes	Charles Cyzer	100/1
18	3	Unigold	Seb Sanders	Ed Dunlop	50/1
19	4	Lundy's Lane	Brett Doyle	Clive Brittain	100/1
20	7	Prince Nureyev	Steve Drowne	Rod Millman	150/1

* The distances between the horses are shown in lengths or shorter. shd = short-head; hd = head; nk = neck.
† Trainers are based in Great Britain unless indicated.

== Winner's details ==
Further details of the winner, Kris Kin:

- Foaled: 5 March 2000 in Kentucky, US
- Sire: Kris S.; Dam: Angel in My Heart (Rainbow Quest)
- Owner: Saeed Suhail
- Breeder: Flaxman Holdings Ltd
- Rating in 2003 International Classifications: 122

== Form analysis ==
=== Two-year-old races ===
Notable runs by the future Derby participants as two-year-olds in 2002.

- The Great Gatsby – 6th Beresford Stakes, 4th Racing Post Trophy, 4th Critérium de Saint-Cloud
- Alamshar – 1st Beresford Stakes
- Norse Dancer – 4th Vintage Stakes, 4th Royal Lodge Stakes, 7th Racing Post Trophy
- Dutch Gold – 9th Royal Lodge Stakes
- Graikos – 3rd Prix des Chênes, 1st Prix de Condé, 9th Critérium de Saint-Cloud
- Magistretti – 2nd Superlative Stakes, 5th Royal Lodge Stakes
- Summerland – 9th Vintage Stakes, 10th Champagne Stakes, 2nd Critérium de Saint-Cloud
- Alberto Giacometti – 1st Critérium de Saint-Cloud
- Refuse to Bend – 1st National Stakes
- Brian Boru – 2nd Beresford Stakes, 1st Racing Post Trophy
- Unigold – 6th Royal Lodge Stakes
- Prince Nureyev – 4th Chesham Stakes

=== The road to Epsom ===
Early-season appearances in 2003 and trial races prior to running in the Derby.

- Kris Kin – 1st Dee Stakes
- The Great Gatsby – 2nd Derrinstown Stud Derby Trial
- Alamshar – 2nd Ballysax Stakes, 1st Derrinstown Stud Derby Trial
- Norse Dancer – 3rd 2,000 Guineas
- Balestrini – 1st Ballysax Stakes, 4th Prix Lupin
- Dutch Gold – 2nd Easter Stakes, 1st Chester Vase
- Let Me Try Again – 2nd Lingfield Derby Trial
- Graikos – 5th Dante Stakes
- Magistretti – 1st Feilden Stakes, 1st Dante Stakes
- Shield – 1st Sandown Classic Trial
- Summerland – 6th Sandown Classic Trial, 2nd Chester Vase
- Alberto Giacometti – 3rd Ballysax Stakes, 3rd Prix Lupin
- Refuse to Bend – 1st Leopardstown 2,000 Guineas Trial Stakes, 1st 2,000 Guineas
- Franklins Gardens – 1st Blue Riband Trial Stakes, 1st Lingfield Derby Trial
- Dunhill Star – 2nd Feilden Stakes, 3rd Dante Stakes
- Brian Boru – 3rd Derrinstown Stud Derby Trial
- Strength 'n Honour – 3rd Sandown Classic Trial
- Unigold – 2nd Predominate Stakes
- Lundy's Lane – 7th UAE Derby, 2nd Craven Stakes, 19th 2,000 Guineas, 3rd Derby Italiano

=== Subsequent Group 1 wins ===
Group 1 / Grade I victories after running in the Derby.

- Alamshar – Irish Derby (2003), King George VI and Queen Elizabeth Stakes (2003)
- Magistretti – Man o' War Stakes (2004)
- Refuse to Bend – Queen Anne Stakes (2004), Eclipse Stakes (2004)
- Brian Boru – St. Leger (2003)

== Subsequent breeding careers ==
Leading progeny of participants in the 2003 Epsom Derby.

=== Sires of Classic winners ===
Refuse To Bend (13th)

- Sarafina - 1st Prix de Diane (2010)
- Wavering - 1st Prix Saint-Alary (2011)
- Refuse To Bobbin - 1st Premio Presidente della Repubblica (2014)
- Ned Buntline - 2nd Johnny Henderson Grand Annual Chase (2014)

=== Sires of National Hunt horses ===
Brian Boru (16th)

- Fox Norton - 1st Melling Chase (2017)
- Sub Lieutenant - 2nd Melling Chase (2017)
- Shotgun Paddy - 1st Classic Chase (2014)
- Bold Sir Brian - 1st Premier Kelso Hurdle (2011)

Norse Dancer (4th)

- Yanworth - 1st Christmas Hurdle (2016), 1st Liverpool Hurdle (2017)
- Magic Dancer - 2nd Betfair Hurdle (2019)
- Norse King - 1st Prix du Conseil de Paris (2013)
- Dorcas Lane - 3rd Ribblesdale Stakes (2011)

Alberto Giacometti (12th)

- Une Artiste - 1st Fred Winter Juvenile Novices' Handicap Hurdle (2012)
- Montbazon - 3rd Vincent O'Brien County Handicap Hurdle (2014)
- Dans La Foulee - 1st Prix Wild Monarch (Pouliches)
- Solivate - Dam of Energy d'Olivate (3rd Prix Amadou 2018)

=== Other Stallions ===
Kris Kin (1st) - Sired fairly useful flat and jumps winners before being exported to Italy
Alamshar (3rd) - Exported to Japan - Relocated to Ireland - Returned to Japan - Minor flat and jumps winners
The Great Gatsby (2nd) - Exported to Russia
Balestrini (5th) - Exported to Australia
Graikos (8th) - Exported to Iran
Magistretti (9th) - Exported to India
Franklins Gardens (14th) - Minor jumps runners
Dunhill Star (15th) - Exported to Pakistan
