= Mistigri =

Mistigri is French for "pussy cat" or "kitten" and may refer to:

- Mistigri (film), a 1931 French film
- Mistigri (racehorse), a racehorse
- Mistigri (card game), a gambling and family card game
