= Desmond Stakes =

Flat horse race in Ireland

- Class: Group 3
- Location: Leopardstown; County Dublin, Ireland
- Race type: Flat / Thoroughbred
- Sponsor: Clipper Logistics
- Website: Leopardstown

Race information
- Distance: 1 mile (1,609 metres)
- Surface: Turf
- Track: Left-handed
- Qualification: Three-years-old and up
- Weight: 9 st 0 lb (3yo); 9 st 7 lb (4yo+); Allowances; 3 lb for fillies and mares Penalties; 5 lb for G1 / G2 winners * 3 lb for G3 winners * * since 1 January this year
- Purse: €50,000 (2020); 1st: €29,500

Desmond Stakes
2026
Isaac Newton	Needle Match	Audience

Previous years
2025
Johan	Alakazi	Chicago Critic
2024
Mutasarref	Mountain Bear	Lord Massusus
2023
Lord Massusus	Alfred Munnings	Mutasarref
2022
Boundless Ocean	Juncture	Charterhouse
2021
Create Belief	Georgeville	Real Appeal

2020-2011
2020
Royal Dornoch	Ancient Spirit	Bowerman
2019
Madhmoon	Zuenoon	I Am Superman
2018
Pincheck	Masaarr	Zorion
2017
Alexios Komnenos	Music Box	Custom Cut
2016
Tribal Beat	Cougar Mountain	Hit It A Bomb
2015
Cougar Mountain	Raydara	Convergence
2014
Custom Cut	Brendan Brackan	Sruthan
2013
Gordon Lord Byron	Ansgar	Leitir Mor
2012
Duntle	Ballybacka Lady	Requisition
2011
Future Generation	Emiyna	Moran Gra

2010-2001
2010
Beethoven	Dandy Boy	Emulous
2009
Famous Name	Three Rocks	Poet
2008
Carribean Sunset	Blythe Knight	Deauville Vision
2007
She's Our Mark	Eastern Appeal	Haatef
2006
King Jock	Arch Rebel	Arabian Prince
2005
Caradak	Mustameet	Majestic Desert
2004
Ace	Hamairi	Grand Passion
2003
Refuse To Bend	Latino Magic	Middlemarch
2002
Dress To Thrill	Duck Row	Surveyor
2001
Hawkeye	Pebble Island	Maumee

2000-1991
2000
Golden Silca	Duck Row	Muakaad
1999
Haami	Castle Quest	Moiseyev
1998
Second Empire	Centre Stalls	Burden Of Proof
1997
Swift Gulliver	Dangerous Diva	Supercal
1996
Idris	Raiyoun	Peace Prize
1995
Mr Martini	Ivory Frontier	Timarida
1994
Bin Ajwaad	Soviet Line	Mistle Cat
1993
Asema	Eurolink Thunder	Massyar
1992
Via Borghese	Gdansk's Honour	Sure Sharp
1991
Star Of Gdansk	Sportsworld	Approach The Bench

1990-1988
1990
Kostroma	Bold Russian	Thakib
1989
Llyn Gwynant	Upward Trend	Colway Rally
1988
Totem	Hoy	Dancing Goddess

The Desmond Stakes is a Group 3 flat horse race in Ireland open to thoroughbreds aged three years or older. It is run at Leopardstown over a distance of 1 mile (1,609 metres), and it is scheduled to take place each year in August.

The event is named after Desmond, a champion sire in 1913. It was formerly held at the Curragh, and it used to be known as the Desmond Plate.

The race was transferred to Leopardstown in 2002. It has continued at this venue with one exception, a temporary return to the Curragh in 2009.

== Records ==
Most successful horse since 1946 (2 wins):

- Spring Offensive – 1946, 1947
- White Gloves – 1966, 1967
- Rarity – 1970, 1971

Leading jockey since 1950 (8 wins):

- Christy Roche – Rarity (1971), Mistigri (1975), More So (1978), Anfield (1982), Teleprompter (1984), Totem (1988), Star of Gdansk (1991), Second Empire (1998)

Leading trainer since 1950 (12 wins):

- Vincent O'Brien – Restless Knight (1964), Reindeer (1969), Boucher (1972), Hail the Pirates (1973), Sir Penfro (1974), Niebo (1976), Be My Guest (1977), Belted Earl (1981), Sunstart (1985), Wise Counsellor (1986), Entitled (1987), Via Borghese (1992)

== Winners since 1976 ==
Year	Winner	Age	Jockey	Trainer	Time
1976	Niebo	3	Lester Piggott	Vincent O'Brien
1977	Be My Guest	3	Tommy Murphy	Vincent O'Brien	1:40.80
1978	More So	3	Christy Roche	Paddy Prendergast
1979	Spence Bay	4	Tony Murray	Seamus McGrath
1980	My Hollow	5	Declan Gillespie	Jim Bolger
1981	Belted Earl	3	Pat Eddery	Vincent O'Brien
1982	Anfield	3	Christy Roche	David O'Brien
1983	Erins Hope	4	Declan Gillespie	Jim Bolger
1984	Teleprompter	4	Christy Roche	Bill Watts
1985	Sunstart	3	Pat Eddery	Vincent O'Brien
1986	Wise Counsellor	3	Pat Eddery	Vincent O'Brien	1:40.70
1987	Entitled	3	Cash Asmussen	Vincent O'Brien	1:37.30
1988	Totem	3	Christy Roche	David O'Brien	1:49.00
1989	Llyn Gwynant	4	Declan Gillespie	John Dunlop	1:34.30
1990	Kostroma	4	Stephen Craine	Tommy Stack	1:37.30
1991	Star of Gdansk	3	Christy Roche	Jim Bolger	1:36.30
1992	Via Borghese	3	Willie Carson	Vincent O'Brien	1:41.00
1993	Asema	3	Michael Kinane	Dermot Weld	1:46.20
1994	Bin Ajwaad (Note: Heart Lake finished first in 1994, but he was relegated to last place following a stewards' inquiry)	4	Lester Piggott	Ben Hanbury	1:36.40
1995	Mr Martini (Note: Ivory Frontier and Timarida were first and second in 1995, but the race was awarded to the third-placed horse)	5	Brett Doyle	Clive Brittain	1:37.10
1996	Idris	6	Kevin Manning	Jim Bolger	1:38.40
1997	Swift Gulliver	3	Kevin Manning	Jim Bolger	1:38.80
1998	Second Empire	3	Christy Roche	Aidan O'Brien	1:35.60
1999	Haami	4	John Reid	John Dunlop	1:40.40
2000	Golden Silca	4	Johnny Murtagh	Mick Channon	1:41.70
2001	Hawkeye	3	Michael Kinane	Aidan O'Brien	1:45.20
2002	Dress to Thrill	3	Pat Smullen	Dermot Weld	1:38.80
2003	Refuse to Bend	3	Pat Smullen	Dermot Weld	1:37.30
2004	Ace	3	Jamie Spencer	Aidan O'Brien	1:37.30
2005	Caradak	4	Michael Kinane	John Oxx	1:38.30
2006	King Jock	5	Pat Shanahan	Robbie Osborne	1:40.80
2007	She's Our Mark	3	Danny Grant	Pat Flynn	1:42.69
2008	Carribean Sunset	3	Pat Smullen	Dermot Weld	1:44.32
2009	Famous Name	4	Pat Smullen	Dermot Weld	1:42.79
2010	Beethoven	3	Joseph O'Brien	Aidan O'Brien	1:39.52
2011	Future Generation	3	Keagan Latham	Ger Lyons	1:39.91
2012	Duntle	3	Wayne Lordan	David Wachman	1:46.26
2013	Gordon Lord Byron	5	Johnny Murtagh	Tom Hogan	1:38.74
2014	Custom Cut	5	Daniel Tudhope	David O'Meara	1:43.10
2015	Cougar Mountain	4	Joseph O'Brien	Aidan O'Brien	1:41.87
2016	Tribal Beat	3	Kevin Manning	Jim Bolger	1:41.90
2017	Alexios Komnenos	3	Chris Hayes	Fozzy Stack	1:43.98
2018	Pincheck	4	Colm O'Donoghue	Jessica Harrington	1:41.36
2019	Madhmoon	3	Chris Hayes	Kevin Prendergast	1:42.01
2020	Royal Dornoch	3	Seamie Heffernan	Aidan O'Brien	1:41.86
2021	Create Belief	3	Shane Kelly	Johnny Murtagh	1:43.92
2022	Boundless Ocean	3	Kevin Manning	Jim Bolger	1:42.14
2023	Lord Massusus	3	Garry Carroll	Joseph G Murphy	1:40.61
2024	Mutasarref	6	Colin Keane	Ger Lyons	1:40.48
2025	Johan	8	Ronan Whelan	Jack Channon	1:39.67
2026	Isaac Newton	3	Ryan Moore	Aidan O'Brien	1:38.11

== Earlier winners ==
- 1946: Spring Offensive
- 1947: Spring Offensive
- 1948: Straight Flush
- 1949: Pink Larkspur
- 1950: Galatian
- 1951: Fair Contract
- 1952: Tipots
- 1953: Clonleason
- 1954: Zarathustra
- 1955: Midontrial
- 1956: Jongleur
- 1957: Bindy
- 1958: Ticklish
- 1959: Light Horseman
- 1960: Barclay
- 1961: Baynard
- 1962: Sicilian Prince
- 1963: Wily Trout
- 1964: Restless Knight
- 1965: Khalife
- 1966: White Gloves
- 1967: White Gloves
- 1968: Giolla Mear
- 1969: Reindeer
- 1970: Rarity
- 1971: Rarity
- 1972: Boucher
- 1973: Hail the Pirates
- 1974: Sir Penfro
- 1975: Mistigri

== See also ==
- Horse racing in Ireland
- List of Irish flat horse races
