= Hawaiian Sound =

American-bred, British-trained Thoroughbred racehorse

- Sire: Hawaii
- Grandsire: Utrillo
- Dam: Sound of Success
- Damsire: Successor
- Sex: Stallion
- Foaled: 7 April 1975
- Country: United States
- Colour: Bay
- Owner: Robert Sangster
- Trainer: Barry Hills
- Record: 15:5-5-2

Major wins
- Benson and Hedges Gold Cup (1978)

Awards
- Timeform rating 113 (1977), 129 (1978)
- Last updated on 1 September 2022

Hawaiian Sound (foaled 7 April 1975) was an American-bred, British-trained Thoroughbred racehorse and sire. In a fifteen-race career he won five times, including the Group One Benson and Hedges Gold Cup in 1978. The horse was also placed in several other top-class races – Royal Lodge Stakes, Chester Vase, the Derby, Irish Derby, King George VI and Queen Elizabeth Stakes and Champion Stakes. His later career was compromised by illness and he was not a success at stud.

== Background ==
Hawaiian Sound was a lightly made bay horse with a white sock on his right hind leg, bred by Arthur B. Hancock III's Stone Farm near Paris, Kentucky. He was sired by Hawaii, a South African Champion at two and three before being sent to the United States, where he was named the 1969 American Champion Turf Horse. His dam, Sound of Success, later produced the Goodwood Cup winner Sonus and the unraced Accordion, a leading sire of National Hunt horses. As a descendant of the broodmare Tiara, Sound of Success came from the same branch of Thoroughbred Family 2-n, which also produced the racemare Forest Flower.

As a yearling, Hawaiian Sound was sent to the Keeneland September Sale, where he was sold for $32,000. He entered the ownership of Robert Sangster and was sent to Europe to be trained by Barry Hills at Lambourn.

== Racing career ==
=== 1977: two-year-old season ===
After finishing second on his debut, Hawaiian Sound recorded his first success in a six furlong maiden race at York Racecourse in July winning by three lengths from fifteen opponents. In September, the colt was moved up in class and distance for the Royal Lodge Stakes over one mile at Ascot, and was made 11/4 favourite, largely on reports that he was superior to his stable companion Sexton Blake, who had won the Champagne Stakes. He never looked likely to win, finishing third, 2 1/2 lengths behind the winner Shirley Heights. On his final appearance of the year, Hawaiian Sound finished eighth of the twelve runners behind Dactylographer in the William Hill Futurity after being badly hampered in the early stages.

=== 1978: three-year-old season ===
Hawaiian Sound began his three-year-old season in March 1978 when he won a minor event over one mile at Kempton Park Racecourse, beating Sharpen Your Eye by three lengths. In April he won the Heath Stakes over nine furlongs at Newmarket Racecourse, beating M-Lolshan. In the Chester Vase, he started the odds-on favourite but was beaten a neck by Icelandic.

The American jockey Willie Shoemaker was brought over to ride Hawaiian Sound in his next three races. At Epsom Downs Racecourse in June, the colt started a 25/1 outsider for the 199th running of the Derby Stakes. Shoemaker sent Hawaiian Sound into the lead from the start and the colt looked the likely winner in the last quarter mile but was caught in the final strides and was beaten a head by Greville Starkey on Shirley Heights. In the Irish Derby later that month he fought against Shoemaker's attempts to restrain him and after taking the lead in the straight he was beaten in a three-way photo-finish by Shirley Heights and Exdirectory. In July, Hawaiian Sound was matched against older horses for the first time when he contested the King George VI and Queen Elizabeth Stakes at Ascot Racecourse. He finished third behind Ile de Bourbon and Acamas but was later promoted to second after the runner-up was disqualified for failing a drug test.

In August, Hawaiian Sound was brought back in distance for the Benson and Hedges Gold Cup over 10 1/2 furlongs at York Racecourse. Ridden by Lester Piggott, he started the 2/1 favourite against a field which included Balmerino, Julio Mariner, Gunner B, More So, Cistus (Nassau Stakes) and Don (Lockinge Stakes). Hawaiian Sound took the lead soon after the start, went clear of his rivals early in the straight and won by a length and a half from Gunner B, with Jellaby in third. Hawaiian Sound bypassed the Prix de l'Arc de Triomphe and was aimed instead at the Champion Stakes at Newmarket Racecourse in October. Starting the 7/4 favourite, he appeared to reproduce his York form but was beaten into second place by the improving filly Swiss Maid.

=== 1979: four-year-old season ===
Hawaiian Sound's third season was compromised by illness, as the Hills stable was affected by a viral infection. He started in the Earl of Sefton Stakes at Newmarket in April for which he was the 5/4 favourite. Ridden by Steve Cauthen, he won from Spring In Deepsea, despite his saddle slipping soon after the start. He failed to reproduce his form in two subsequent outings, finishing unplaced in the Prix Ganay and running fourth in the Prince of Wales's Stakes at Royal Ascot.

== Assessment ==
In 1977, the independent Timeform organisation gave Hawaiian Sound a rating of 113, seventeen pounds behind their top-rated two-year-old Try My Best, commenting that he might "improve a little" over longer distances. In the Free Handicap, a rating of the best juveniles to race in Britain, he was allotted 122 pounds, nine pounds behind Try My Best. In the following year he was rated 129 by Timeform, four pounds behind their top three-year-old colt Ile de Bourbon. In the official International Classification he was also rated four pounds behind Ile de Bourbon, making him the fourth best three-year-old and the fifth-best horse of any age in Europe.

== Stud record ==
Hawaiian Sound retired from racing at the end of 1979 and returned to his birthplace to become a breeding stallion at Stone Farm. He was Syndicated for $2.1 million and starting his stud career at a fee of $15,000. He had problems with low fertility and was bought out by his insurers in 1983. He later stood at the Cedar Creek Farm in Texas. Hawaiian Sound only produced 56 foals in his entire stud career. A yearling colt later named Hawazin was sold at Tattersalls in 1982 for 50,0000 guineas. He was out of the 1000 Guineas winner Enstone Spark. The best of his offspring was Malevic (81) who won the Premio Presidente della Repubblica in 1986 and the filly Miraculous (83) who won Providencia S. (SA,9f Tf) and Royal Heroine Handicap (HOL,8.5f, Tf).

== Pedigree ==
Pedigree of Hawaiian Sound (USA), bay stallion, 1975
Sire Hawaii (SAF) 1964	Utrillo (ITY); 1958	Toulouse Lautrec	Dante
Sire Hawaii (SAF) 1964	Utrillo (ITY); 1958	Toulouse Lautrec	Tokamura
Sire Hawaii (SAF) 1964	Utrillo (ITY); 1958	Urbinella	Alycidon
Sire Hawaii (SAF) 1964	Utrillo (ITY); 1958	Urbinella	Isle of Capri
Sire Hawaii (SAF) 1964	Ethane (SAF); 1947	Mehrali	Mahmoud
Sire Hawaii (SAF) 1964	Ethane (SAF); 1947	Mehrali	Una
Sire Hawaii (SAF) 1964	Ethane (SAF); 1947	Ethyl	Clustine
Sire Hawaii (SAF) 1964	Ethane (SAF); 1947	Ethyl	Armond
Dam Sound of Success (USA) 1969	Successor (USA); 1964	Bold Ruler	Nasrullah
Dam Sound of Success (USA) 1969	Successor (USA); 1964	Bold Ruler	Miss Disco
Dam Sound of Success (USA) 1969	Successor (USA); 1964	Misty Morn	Princequillo
Dam Sound of Success (USA) 1969	Successor (USA); 1964	Misty Morn	Grey Flight
Dam Sound of Success (USA) 1969	Belle Musique (USA); 1963	Tudor Minstrel	Owen Tudor
Dam Sound of Success (USA) 1969	Belle Musique (USA); 1963	Tudor Minstrel	Sansonnet
Dam Sound of Success (USA) 1969	Belle Musique (USA); 1963	Bellesoeur	Beau Pere
Dam Sound of Success (USA) 1969	Belle Musique (USA); 1963	Bellesoeur	Donatrice (Family: 2-n)
