= Sindon (horse) =

British-bred Thoroughbred racehorse

- Sire: Hyperbole
- Grandsire: Hyperion
- Dam: Cotton Wool
- Damsire: Donatello
- Sex: Stallion
- Foaled: 1955
- Country: United Kingdom
- Colour: Chestnut
- Breeder: Anne Biddle
- Owner: Anne Biddle
- Trainer: Michaek Dawson

Major wins
- Irish Derby (1958)

Sindon was a British-bred, Irish-trained Thoroughbred racehorse who won the 1958 Irish Derby.

== Background ==
Sindon was a chestnut horse bred in the United Kingdom by Anne Biddle. Mrs Biddle sent her colt into training with Michael Dawson.

== Racing career ==
As a three-year-old in 1958, Sindon finished second to the subsequent Epsom Derby winner Hard Ridden in the Irish 2000 Guineas at the Curragh. In the Irish Derby at the same course in June he was ridden by Liam Ward and started at odds of 100/8 in a 12-runner field. He won by a short head from Paddy's Point, who had finished second to Hard Ridden at Epsom, with Royal Highway in third. Later in the year he finished second to Royal Highway in the Irish St Leger and was then sent to England where he finished second to the filly Bella Paola in the Champion Stakes.

== Stud record ==
After his retirement from racing, Sindon stood as a breeding stallion in Europe, the United States and Japan.
