= Swiss Maid =

British Thoroughbred racehorse

- Sire: Welsh Pageant
- Grandsire: Tudor Melody
- Dam: Hornton Grange
- Damsire: Hornbeam
- Sex: Mare
- Foaled: 13 February 1975
- Country: United Kingdom
- Colour: Bay
- Breeder: Mrs J R Hine
- Owner: Max Fine
- Trainer: Paul Kelleway
- Record: 20:5-2-2

Major wins
- Sun Chariot Stakes (1978); Champion Stakes (1978)

Awards
- Top-rated European three-year-old filly (1978); Timeform top-rated three-year-old filly (1978); Top-rated British older female racehorse (1979); Timeform rating 129 (1978), 121 (1979)

Swiss Maid (13 February 1975 – after 1992) was a British Thoroughbred racehorse and broodmare, who was rated the best three-year-old filly in Europe in 1978. Unraced as a two-year-old, she won only one of her first eight races in 1978 and appeared to be some way inferior to the best horses of her generation. She then showed consistent improvement, winning her last four races of the season including the Sun Chariot Stakes and ended her year by decisively defeating a strong international field in the weight-for-age Champion Stakes. She remained in training as a four-year-old but failed to reproduce the form he had shown in the autumn of 1978. She made no impact as a broodmare.

== Background ==
Swiss Maid was a strongly-built, dark-coated bay mare with no white markings bred by Mrs J R Hine. She was sired by Welsh Pageant, a one-mile specialist whose wins included the Lockinge Stakes, Queen Anne Stakes and Queen Elizabeth II Stakes. Welsh Pageant's other progeny included the Arlington Million winner Teleprompter and the Ascot Gold Cup winner Longboat. Swiss Maid was the third foal of her dam, Hornton Grange, a half-sister to the dam of the Derby Italiano winner Don Orazio.

As a yearling the filly was sold for 6000 guineas and was sent into training with Paul Kelleway at his Shalfleet stable in Newmarket, Suffolk.

== Racing career ==
=== 1978: three-year-old season ===
Swiss Maid was unraced as a two-year-old but was highly tried in the spring of her three-year-old season. Her racecourse debut was scheduled for 19 April when she was to be matched against in the Wood Ditton Stakes over one mile at Newmarket Racecourse, but the filly refused to enter the starting stalls and was withdrawn. When she reappeared a few days later in the Princess Elizabeth Stakes at Epsom Downs Racecourse she was equipped with a hood and finished fourth behind the subsequently disqualified Be Sweet. She was then moved up sharply in class for the 166th running of the 1000 Guineas over the same course and distance and finished unplaced behind Enstone Spark. Moved up in distance for the Group Three Musidora Stakes at York Racecourse in May the filly finished fourth behind the Barry Hills-trained Princess of Man. Later that month, Swiss Maid ran in the Lupe Stakes at Goodwood Racecourse, which, like the Musidora Stakes, is a trial race for the Oaks Stakes. She finished second, four lengths behind the impressive winner Cistus.

In June, Swiss Maid (now racing without a hood) was dropped in class and recorded her first victory, winning the Twyford Stakes over ten furlong at Newbury Racecourse. The filly was beaten in her next two races (including a poor effort when tried over one and a half miles in the Churchill Stakes at Royal Ascot) and was then dropped in distance for the Twickenham Stakes over seven furlongs at Kempton Park Racecourse and won from Spring In Deepsea, who was carrying ten pounds more than the winner. In the Virginia Stakes over ten furlongs at Newcastle Racecourse she won again, beating Sofala and Seraphima.

Swiss Maid then appeared at Newmarket in early October when she ran in the ten furlong Sun Chariot Stakes, which was then a Group Two race. Ridden by Lester Piggott, she started at odds of 5/1 and recorded her most important success up to that time beating Be Sweet and Upper Deck by three quarters of a length and a length. Two weeks later, over the same course and distance, Swiss Maid moved up to Group One class for the weight-for-age Champion Stakes. With Piggott choosing to ride the favourite Hawaiian Sound (winner of the Benson and Hedges Gold Cup) she was ridden by Greville Starkey and started at odds of 9/1 while the other major contenders included the French filly Dancing Maid (winner of the Prix Vermeille and third in the Prix de l'Arc de Triomphe) and the Eclipse Stakes winner Gunner B. Piggott sent Hawaiian Sound into the lead and set a strong pace ahead of Gunner B but Starkey moved Swiss Maid up to dispute the lead two furlongs from the finish and always looked the likely winner. She finished strongly and won by one and a half lengths from Hawaiian Sound, with Gunner B finishing third ahead of the French-trained colts Pevero and Pyjama Hunt.

In December, Swiss Maid was offered for sale and bought back for 325,000 guineas.

=== 1979: four-year-old season ===
Swiss Maid remained in training as a four-year-old but failed to win in nine races. At Royal Ascot in June she finished a close third behind Obraztsovy when attempting one and a half miles in the Hardwicke Stakes. She finished last in both the Eclipse Stakes and the King George VI and Queen Elizabeth Stakes, becoming very agitated in the starting stalls in the former race. By this time she had acquired a reputation for being a rather temperamental and "wayward" horse. At Goodwood in July she produced her best effort of the year when finishing second to Kris in the Sussex Stakes. After a respectable performance in the Benson and Hedges Gold Cup at York in August, when she finished fourth behind Troy, she was unplaced in her last three races.

At the end of the year, Swiss Maid returned to the sales: she was sold for 290,000 guineas and exported to the United States.

== Assessment ==
In 1978, the independent Timeform organisation gave Swiss Maid a rating of 129, making her their top-rated three-year-old filly of the season. In the inaugural International Classification, a collaboration between the official handicappers of France, Ireland and the United Kingdom, Swiss Maid was rated the best three-year-old filly in Europe ahead of Reine de Saba and Dancing Maid and the join-fifth best racehorse of any age behind Alleged, Ile de Bourbon, Acamas and Shirley Heights. In the following year, Swiss Maid was rated on 121 by Timeform while the International Classification rated her the best older female racehorse trained in Britain.

== Stud record ==
Swiss Maid was sold in January 1988 to Allez France Stables for $120,000. Swiss Maid produced at least three foals between 1985 and 1992, none of whom were successful racehorses:

- Swiss Sphere (chestnut filly, foaled in 1985, sired by Globe)
- Sauvan (gelding, 1988, by Palace Music)
- Sèvres (bay filly, 1992, sired by Lyphard's Wish)

== Pedigree ==
Pedigree of Swiss Maid (GB), bay mare, 1975
Sire Welsh Pageant (FR) 1966	Tudor Melody (GB); 1956	Tudor Minstrel	Owen Tudor
Sire Welsh Pageant (FR) 1966	Tudor Melody (GB); 1956	Tudor Minstrel	Sansonnet
Sire Welsh Pageant (FR) 1966	Tudor Melody (GB); 1956	Matelda	Dante
Sire Welsh Pageant (FR) 1966	Tudor Melody (GB); 1956	Matelda	Fairly Hot
Sire Welsh Pageant (FR) 1966	Picture Light (FR); 1954	Court Martial	Fair Trial
Sire Welsh Pageant (FR) 1966	Picture Light (FR); 1954	Court Martial	Instantaneous
Sire Welsh Pageant (FR) 1966	Picture Light (FR); 1954	Double Deal	Borealis
Sire Welsh Pageant (FR) 1966	Picture Light (FR); 1954	Double Deal	Picture Play
Dam Hornton Grange (GB) 1967	Hornbeam (GB); 1953	Hyperion	Gainsborough
Dam Hornton Grange (GB) 1967	Hornbeam (GB); 1953	Hyperion	Selene
Dam Hornton Grange (GB) 1967	Hornbeam (GB); 1953	Thicket	Nasrullah
Dam Hornton Grange (GB) 1967	Hornbeam (GB); 1953	Thicket	Thorn Wood
Dam Hornton Grange (GB) 1967	Grove Hall (GB); 1959	Hook Money	Bernborough
Dam Hornton Grange (GB) 1967	Grove Hall (GB); 1959	Hook Money	Besieged
Dam Hornton Grange (GB) 1967	Grove Hall (GB); 1959	Ski Club	Chamossaire
Dam Hornton Grange (GB) 1967	Grove Hall (GB); 1959	Ski Club	Private Entree (Family: 1-g)
