= Barton (horse) =

British racehorse

- Sire: Port Ettienne
- Grandsire: Mill Reef
- Dam: Peanuts
- Damsire: Mistigri
- Sex: Gelding
- Foaled: 19 February 1993
- Country: United Kingdom
- Colour: Chestnut
- Breeder: Conkwell Grange Stud
- Owner: Stanley Clarke
- Trainer: Charlie Brooks; Tim Easterby
- Record: 26:14-4-1
- Earnings: £295,047

Major wins
- Classic Novices' Hurdle (1998); Winter Novices' Hurdle (1998); River Don Novices' Hurdle (1999); Royal & SunAlliance Novices' Hurdle (1999); Mersey Novices' Hurdle (1999); Fighting Fifth Hurdle (2000); Aintree Hurdle (2001); Dipper Novices' Chase (2002); Mildmay Novices' Chase (2002)

Barton (19 February 1993 – 2004) was a British racehorse of Thoroughbred and Anglo-Arabian ancestry who competed in National Hunt racing. In a racing career which lasted from October 1997 until November 2003 he won fourteen of his twenty-six races. He had his greatest success in the 1998/1999 National Hunt season when he dominated the novice hurdle division in Britain, winning all seven of his races including the Classic Novices' Hurdle, Winter Novices' Hurdle, River Don Novices' Hurdle, Royal & SunAlliance Novices' Hurdle and Mersey Novices' Hurdle. After missing the next season he returned to win the Fighting Fifth Hurdle and the Aintree Hurdle, easily defeating Best Mate in the latter race. When switched to steeplechasing he won the Dipper Novices' Chase and the Mildmay Novices' Chase but was never as effective as he had been over hurdles.

== Background ==
Barton was a light-coated chestnut horse with a white blaze bred in Somerset by the Conkwell Grange Stud. During his racing career he stood over seventeen hands high making him an unusually large Thoroughbred: he was described as having a "narrow frame" and a long neck. He was probably the best horse sired by the French-bred stallion Port Etienne. His dam was a French mare named Peanuts, which made Barton one of the few notable racehorses produced by Thoroughbred family 42. Despite her heritage, Peanuts and her descendants were not technically Thoroughbreds as she was a great-granddaughter of Calibres, a mare whose pedigree included desert-bred Arabian stallions Telmese and Kahil El Adjouz.

As a yearling colt in November 1994, Barton was sent to the Doncaster sales but was not sold as he failed to reach his reserve price of 3,300 guineas. He was acquired privately by the businessman Stanley Clarke (who lived in the village of Barton-under-Needwood) and sent into training with Charlie Brooks at Lambourn in Berkshire.

== Racing career ==
=== 1997/1998 National Hunt season: National Hunt Flat races ===
Barton made his debut in a National Hunt Flat race at Huntingdon Racecourse on 10 October 1997. He showed a good deal of temperament, whipping round at the start and then fighting the attempts of Gerry Brace his inexperienced jockey to restrain him in the early stages. He appeared to win the race easily at odds of 4/1 but was disqualified for briefly running off the course just after half way. On his only other appearance that season he finished second when 8/11 favourite for a similar event at Bangor-on-Dee.

Before the start of the next season, Brooks retired from training and Barton was sent to Yorkshire to be trained by Tim Easterby. Brooks said of the horse "physically he was forward, but mentally he was backward". Easterby said that on his arrival Barton was "a big, awkward jumper. We just kept jumping him twice a week down our row of eight small logs".

=== 1998/1999 National Hunt season: Novice hurdle races ===
In the 1998/1999 National Hunt season, Barton competed in novice hurdle races and was partnered in all seven of his starts by the Irish jockey Lorcan Wyer. He made his debut over obstacles at Wetherby Racecourse on 14 October and won by two lengths from Freelander at odds of 4/5. Eleven days later at the same course he was moved up in distance for a race over two miles seven furlongs and won "very easily" by six lengths despite some jumping errors. In the following month, Barton was moved up in class for the Grade II Classic Novices' Hurdle over two and a half miles at Uttoxeter Racecourse. He took the lead three hurdle from the finish and went clear of his five opponents to win by six lengths in "impressive" style. In December, Barton started 8/11 favourite in a field of seven for the Winter Novices Hurdle at Sandown Park Racecourse. He took the lead at the second last and quickly went four lengths clear. He appeared to idle on the run-in and had to be "shaken up" by Wyer to hold off the late challenge of King's Road by half a length. King's Road went on to record Grade I victories in the Challow Novices' Hurdle and the Sefton Novices' Hurdle before the end of the season.

On 30 January, Barton prepared for the Cheltenham Festival with a run in the River Don Novices' Hurdle at Doncaster Racecourse. He took the lead at the third last hurdle, accelerated clear and survived a bad mistake at the last to win by fifteen lengths from Major Sponsor. At Cheltenham on 17 March, Barton started 2/1 favourite for the Grade I Royal & SunAlliance Novices' Hurdle against seventeen opponents including King's Road, Behrajan (Tolworth Hurdle) and the undefeated Irish challenger Alexander Banquet. In the build-up to the race, Easterby, who had been considering the Stayers' Hurdle as an alternative target, described the horse as being "as good a horse as we've had in a long time... [he has] got class and he's got speed. He also gets the trip and jumps well. He's got everything really, although he still needs luck and a good run through the race, which you can never count on at Cheltenham". Wyer positioned Barton just behind the leaders before moving up to take the lead at the second last, where the horse made a slight mistake. He quickened away from the field approaching the last and won by nine lengths from the Jenny Pitman-trained outsider Artadoin Lad. Recalling the race on his retirement a year later, Wyer was critical of his own riding, saying "my five-year-old daughter could have done a more accomplished job" before adding that "the walk back to the winner's enclosure on Barton was pure magic". Barton's final appearance of the season came in the Mersey Novices' Hurdle at the Grand National meeting at Aintree Racecourse in April. He was made the 2/5 favourite with only the Rossington Main Novices' Hurdle winner Tonoco seriously backed against him. The race turned into a contest between Barton and the German-bred five-year-old Auetaler, with the favourite taking the advantage after the last hurdle and winning by two lengths from his rival, to whom he was conceding eight pounds.

After the race, Barton was found to have tendon injuries in both forelegs and missed the whole of the next season. Easterby said "It's no use messing about and thinking we could give him a bit of time bring him back after Christmas. He wants the season off. It's obviously very disappointing but these things happen and there's nothing you can do about it".

=== 2000/2001 National Hunt season ===
By the time Barton returned to racing, Lorcan Wyer had retired and Tony Dobbin took over as his regular jockey. He made his comeback at Newcastle Racecourse on 25 November 2000 in the Grade II Fighting Fifth Hurdle. Despite his nineteen-month absence and the fact that he was racing over the minimum distance of two miles for the first time over hurdles he was made the 8/13 favourite against five opponents. He took the lead three hurdles from the finish and won his eighth consecutive race by seven lengths from The French Furze. After the race, Dobbin said "his jumping was awesome. He gave me a good feel all the way. I was very impressed with him" while Easterby commented "we have to work him on his own at home because he breaks the hearts of the others. Nothing can get near him". In December he started 5/2-second favourite for the Bula Hurdle at Cheltenham but sustained his first defeat in over three years as he was beaten six lengths by the Nicky Henderson-trained five-year-old Geos. Barton was moved back up in distance for the Grade I Cleeve Hurdle at Cheltenham in January and started 2/1 joint-favourite, but tired in the closing stages and finished fifth, more than fifty lengths behind the winner Lady Rebecca.

The 2001 Cheltenham Festival was postponed and then cancelled owing to an outbreak of foot-and-mouth disease. Barton returned at Aintree on 7 April when he started at odds of 9/1 for the Grade I Aintree Hurdle over two and a half miles in which he was opposed by seven rivals including Best Mate and Landing Light. Racing on heavy ground, he tracked the leaders before taking the lead after the second last and drew away to win by fourteen lengths from Best Mate despite being eased down by Dobbin in the closing stages. Best Mate went on to win the next three runnings of the Cheltenham Gold Cup. At the end of April Sandown Park Racecourse staged a series of races intended as substitutes for the major races lost as a result Cheltenham's cancellation including the Grade I Championship Hurdle, a substitute for the Champion Hurdle. Barton started alongside Geos on 11/2, with the French mare Bilboa being made the 7/4 favourite. He raced just behind the leaders, but after a mistake at the second last he appeared to be outpaced and finished fourth behind Landing Light, Geos and Valiramix.

=== 2001/2002 National Hunt season: Novice chases ===
In the following season Barton competed in novice steeplechases. On his first appearance over larger obstacles he started odds-on favourite at Wetherby on 2 November but after taking the lead he was overtaken at the last fence and beaten by the Mary Reveley-trained seven-year-old October Mist. Two weeks later at Newcastle he recorded his first steeplechase win, beating eight opponents "very easily" by twenty lengths. He added two victories against modest opposition in December, winning by twelve lengths at Newcastle and by twenty-one lengths at Wetherby. The gelding was moved up in class on 12 January when he contested the Grade II Dipper Novices' Chase over two and a half miles at Newcastle. He survived a serious jumping error at the sixth fence (where his main betting rival Hussard Collonges fell) before taking the lead four out and winning by thirty lengths from Errand Boy. Barton returned from the race with a bad cut on his left forefoot after losing a shoe, but the injury was not serious. When it was suggested that Barton's opposition over fences had been poor, Easterby responded "there's nowt good enough to take him on" and added "he's one in a million this 'oss, he gallops, he jumps, goes on any ground".

At the 2002 Cheltenham Festival, Easterby opted to run Barton in the Arkle Challenge Trophy over two miles rather than the three-mile Royal & SunAlliance Chase (which was won by Hussard Collonges). Starting the 9/2 third favourite, he never looked likely to win and weakened in the closing stages to finish seventh behind the Irish-trained Moscow Flyer, beaten more than thirty length by the winner. At Aintree a month later, Barton started 3/1 favourite for the Grade II Mildmay Novices' Chase over three miles and one furlong and won by ten lengths from Southern Star having taken the lead three fences from the finish.

=== 2002/2003 National Hunt season ===
Barton remained in training but failed to recapture his best form. At the start of the 2002/2003 National Hunt season he was considered a serious contender for the Cheltenham Gold Cup but was well beaten in all of his four races. In November 2003 he showed signs of a return when he finished second by a neck to his stable companion Turgeonev when carrying top weight of 165 pounds in a handicap chase at Wetherby, but he never ran again.

Barton was euthanised in June 2004 in the same week as fellow Cheltenham Festival winner La Landiere.

== Pedigree ==
Pedigree of Barton, chestnut gelding, 1993
Sire Port Etienne (FR) 1983	Mill Reef (USA); 1968	Never Bend	Nasrullah
Sire Port Etienne (FR) 1983	Mill Reef (USA); 1968	Never Bend	Lalun
Sire Port Etienne (FR) 1983	Mill Reef (USA); 1968	Milan Mill	Princequillo
Sire Port Etienne (FR) 1983	Mill Reef (USA); 1968	Milan Mill	Virginia Water
Sire Port Etienne (FR) 1983	Sierra Morena (ITY); 1973	Canisbay	Doutelle
Sire Port Etienne (FR) 1983	Sierra Morena (ITY); 1973	Canisbay	Stroma
Sire Port Etienne (FR) 1983	Sierra Morena (ITY); 1973	Saigon	Mossborough
Sire Port Etienne (FR) 1983	Sierra Morena (ITY); 1973	Saigon	Savona
Dam Peanuts (FR) 1981	Mistigri (FR); 1971	Misti	Medium
Dam Peanuts (FR) 1981	Mistigri (FR); 1971	Misti	Mist
Dam Peanuts (FR) 1981	Mistigri (FR); 1971	Nyanga	Never Say Die
Dam Peanuts (FR) 1981	Mistigri (FR); 1971	Nyanga	Picaresque
Dam Peanuts (FR) 1981	Cigale (FR); 1968	Night And Day	Soleil Levant
Dam Peanuts (FR) 1981	Cigale (FR); 1968	Night And Day	Nuit de Noces
Dam Peanuts (FR) 1981	Cigale (FR); 1968	Callidie	Antenor
Dam Peanuts (FR) 1981	Cigale (FR); 1968	Callidie	Calabres (Family 42)
