= Waygood =

British Thoroughbred racehorse

- Sire: Tracery
- Grandsire: Rock Sand
- Dam: Ascenseur
- Damsire: Eager
- Sex: Stallion
- Foaled: 1920
- Country: United Kingdom
- Colour: Bay
- Breeder: Walter Raphael
- Owner: Walter Raphael
- Trainer: William Halsey

Major wins
- Irish Derby (1923)

Waygood was a British Thoroughbred race horse and sire best known for winning the Irish Derby Stakes in 1923.

Waygood was bred at the Shenley Stud in Hertfordshire by his owner, the London financier Walter Raphael. He was sired by the American-bred St Leger Stakes winner Tracery out of Ascenseur a mare who became the female ancestor of many notable Thoroughbreds including Galatea II, Never Say Die, High Chaparral and Americain. Raphael sent the colt to be trained at Newmarket, Suffolk by the former jockey Bill Halsey.

Running in front of a large crowd in the Irish Derby at the Curragh Waygood started at odds of 6/1 in a field of fifteen runners. He was ridden by Morny Wing and won by an official margin of four lengths, taking a first prize of £4,650. Walter Raphael, donated £50 from his winnings to the Drogheda Memorial Fund, a charity which helped jockeys and trainers in "necessitous circumstances". As a four-year-old, Waygood finished unplaced behind Parth in the Jubilee Handicap at Kempton Park Racecourse.

At the end of his racing career, Waygood was exported to the United States, where he served as a stallion for the U.S. Army Remount Service.
