= Johnny Roe =

Irish jockey

Personal information
- Nationality: Irish
- Born: March 26, 1938
- Died: April 23, 2017 (aged 79) Dublin, Ireland

Horse racing career
- Sport: Horse racing

Johnny Roe (26 March 1938 – 23 April 2017) was an Irish jockey who competed in Flat racing. Roe was Irish flat racing Champion Jockey on nine occasions and won the 1000 Guineas Stakes in 1975 on Nocturnal Spree. He died in Dublin on 23 April 2017, aged 79.
