= George McGrath (jockey) =

Irish jockey (1943–2022)

George McGrath (28 January 1943 – 19 July 2022) was an Irish jockey who competed in flat racing. McGrath was Irish flat racing Champion Jockey in 1965 and 1970, and gained his biggest victory when riding Weavers' Hall to win the 1973 Irish Derby. He was also associated with the champion sire Sadler's Wells, whom he rode to win the Irish 2,000 Guineas in 1984.
