= Irish flat racing Champion Jockey =

Flat racing title in Ireland

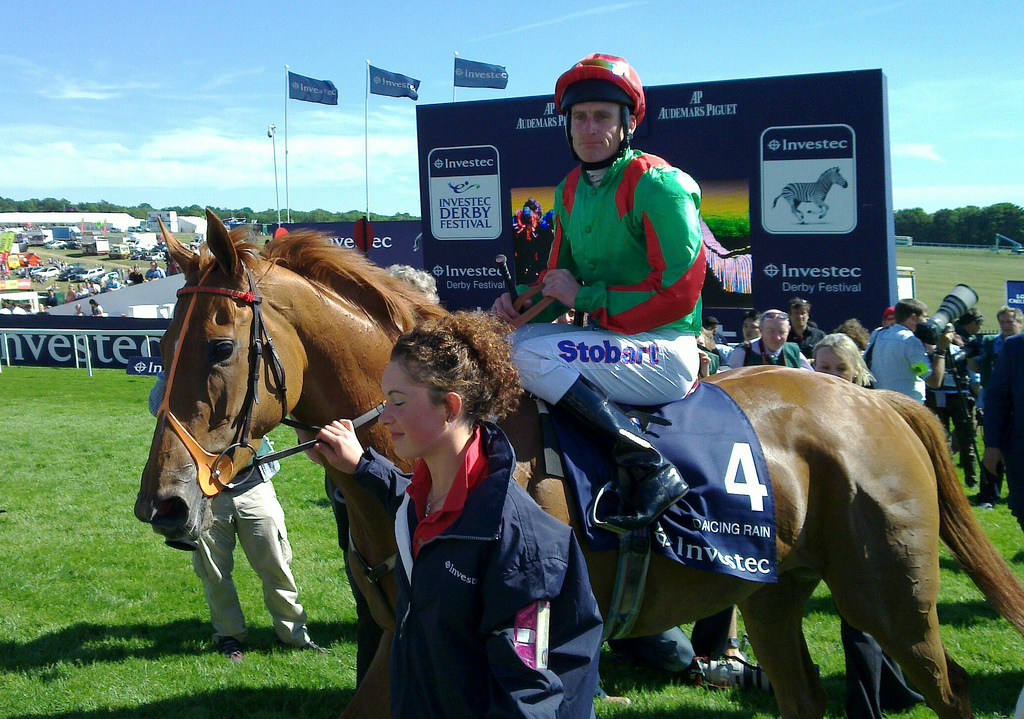
Johnny Murtagh, five times Irish Champion Jockey

The Champion Jockey of flat racing in Ireland is the jockey who has ridden the most winning horses during a season. The list below shows the Champion Jockey for each year since 1950.

== Champion Jockeys since 1950 ==
- 1950 - J W Thompson
- 1951 - Jimmy Mullane
- 1952 - Jimmy Mullane (2)
- 1953 - Liam Ward
- 1954 - Jimmy Eddery
- 1955 - Jimmy Eddery (2)
- 1956 - Liam Ward (2)
- 1957 - Liam Ward (3)
- 1958 - Liam Ward (4)
- 1959 - Liam Ward (5)
- 1960 - Garnet Bougoure
- 1961 - Liam Ward (6)
- 1962 - Pat Glennon
- 1963 - Johnny Roe
- 1964 - Johnny Roe (2)
- 1965 - George McGrath
- 1966 - Johnny Roe (3)
- 1967 - Johnny Roe (4)
- 1968 - Johnny Roe (5)
- 1969 - Buster Parnell
- 1970 - George McGrath (2)
- 1971 - Johnny Roe (6)
- 1972 - Johnny Roe (7)
- 1973 - Johnny Roe (8)
- 1974 - Johnny Roe (9)
- 1975 - Christy Roche
- 1976 - Wally Swinburn
- 1977 - Wally Swinburn (2)
- 1978 - Tommy Murphy
- 1979 - Christy Roche (2)
- 1980 - Christy Roche (3)
- 1981 - Christy Roche (4)
- 1982 - Pat Eddery
- 1983 - Christy Roche (5)
- 1984 - Mick Kinane
- 1985 - Mick Kinane (2)
- 1986 - Mick Kinane (3)
- 1987 - Mick Kinane (4)
- 1988 - Mick Kinane (5)
- 1989 - Mick Kinane (6)
- 1990 - Christy Roche (6)
- 1991 - Mick Kinane (7)
- 1992 - Mick Kinane (8)
- 1993 - Mick Kinane (9)
- 1994 - Mick Kinane (10)
- 1995 - Johnny Murtagh
- 1996 - Johnny Murtagh (2)
- 1997 - Christy Roche (7)
- 1998 - Johnny Murtagh (3) - 87
- 1999 - Mick Kinane (11) - 92
- 2000 - Pat Smullen - 80
- 2001 - Pat Smullen (2) - 81
- 2002 - Mick Kinane (13) - 79
- 2003 - Mick Kinane (14) - 103
- 2004 - Jamie Spencer - 93
- 2005 - Pat Smullen (3) - 67
- 2006 - Declan McDonogh - 86
- 2007 - Pat Smullen (4) - 94
- 2008 - Pat Smullen (5) - 90
- 2009 - Johnny Murtagh - 93
- 2010 - Pat Smullen (6) - 96
- 2011 - Johnny Murtagh - 83
- 2012 - Joseph O'Brien - 87
- 2013 - Joseph O'Brien (2) - 126
- 2014 - Pat Smullen (7) - 108
- 2015 - Pat Smullen (8) - 103
- 2016 - Pat Smullen (9) - 115
- 2017 - Colin Keane - 100
- 2018 - Donnacha O'Brien - 111
- 2019 - Donnacha O'Brien (2) - 111
- 2020 - Colin Keane (2) - 100
- 2021 - Colin Keane (3) - 141
- 2022 - Colin Keane (4) - 92
- 2023 - Colin Keane (5) - 92
- 2024 - Colin Keane (6) - 103
- 2025 - Dylan Browne McMonagle - 95
- 2026 - Billy Lee - 99

== Records ==
- Most titles - 13 - Michael Kinane
- Most consecutive titles - 6 - Michael Kinane
- Most wins in a season - 141 - Colin Keane

== See also ==
- British flat racing Champion Jockey
- Irish jump racing Champion Jockey
