= River Don Novices' Hurdle =

Hurdle horse race in Britain

River Don Novices' Hurdle
2026
Thedeviluno	Country Code	The Last Cloud

Previous years
2025
Yellow Car	Moon Rocket	Ma Shantou
2024
Kerryhill	Welcom To Cartries	The Newest One
2023
Maximilian	Stay Away Fay	Hurricane Bay
2022
Mahler Mission	The Real Whacker	My Bobby Dazzler
2021
The Cob	Portstorm	Castle Robin

2020-2011
2020
Ramses De Teillee	Champagne Well	Eva's Oskar
2019
Nadaitak	Truckers Lodge	Commodore Barry
2018
Enniscoffey Oscar	Shannon Bridge	Samuel Jackson
2017
Constantine Bay	No Hassle Hoff	Duel at Dawn
2016
Barters Hill	Ballydine	Ami Desbois
2015
Caracci Apache	Blaklion	Zeroeshadesofgrey
2014
Urban Hymn	Blakemount	Warden Hill
2012
Rocky Creek	Gullinbursti	Same Difference

2010-2001
2009
Cape Tribulation	Junior	Grizebeck
2008
Battlecry	Coe	One Gulp
2007
Chief Dan George	Fastaffaran	Bradley Boy
2006
Neptune Collonges	Rimsky	Ask The Gatherer
2005
Bewleys Berry	Indy Mood	Romany Prince
2004
Diamant Noir	Eva So Charming	Provocative
2003
Tees Components	Tribal Venture	Cowboyboots
2002
Too Forward	Stromness	Circle Of Wolves
2001
Rum Pointer	Legal Lunch	Mowbray

2000-1991
2000
Barney Knows	Gentle Rivage	Cotteir Chief
1999
Barton	Major Sponsor	Bluedonix
1998
Ginger Fox	Song Of The Sword	Nordic Prince
1997
Inn At The Top	Mighty Moss	Hoh Warrior
1994
Seekin Cash	Nirvana Prince	Corrouge
1993
Hurdy	Bold Ambition	Pollerton's Pride
1991
Cab On Target	Icarus	Lake Teereen

The River Don Novices' Hurdle is a Grade 2 National Hunt hurdle race in Great Britain which is open to horses aged four years or older. It is run at Doncaster Racecourse over a distance of about 3 miles and 110 yards (4,929 metres), and during its running there are eleven hurdles to be jumped. The race is for novice hurdlers, and it is scheduled to take place each year in late January or early February.

The event is named after the River Don which runs through Doncaster. Prior to 2002 the distance of the race was 2 miles and 4 furlongs (4,023 metres), and there were ten hurdles to jump. The race has been sponsored since 2007 by the Albert Bartlett vegetable growing company,

== Winners since 1991 ==
Year	Winner	Age	Jockey	Trainer
1991	Cab on Target	5	Peter Niven	Mary Reveley
1992	Abandoned due to frost
1993	Hurdy	6	Andrew Thornton	Jack Hanson
1994	Seekin Cash	5	Jamie Osborne	Charles Egerton
1995	Abandoned due to snow
1996	Abandoned due to frost
1997	Inn at the Top	5	Derek Byrne	John Norton
1998	Ginger Fox	5	Denis Leahy	Jenny Pitman
1999	Barton	6	Lorcan Wyer	Tim Easterby
2000	Barney Knows	5	Adrian Maguire	Mark Peill
2001	Rum Pointer	5	Russ Garritty	Tim Easterby
2002	Too Forward	6	Adrian Maguire	Mark Pitman
2003	Tees Components	8	Alan Dempsey	Mary Reveley
2004	Diamant Noir	6	Liam Cooper	Jonjo O'Neill
2005	Bewleys Berry	7	Warren Marston	Howard Johnson
2006 (Note: The 2006 and 2007 runnings took place at Wetherby)	Neptune Collonges	5	Christian Williams	Paul Nicholls
2007	Chief Dan George	7	Alan Dempsey	James Moffatt
2008	Battlecry	7	David English	Nigel Twiston-Davies
2009	Cape Tribulation	5	Phil Kinsella	Malcolm Jefferson
2010	Abandoned due to frost
2011	Abandoned due to frost
2012	Rocky Creek	6	Daryl Jacob	Paul Nicholls
2013	Abandoned due to frost
2014	Urban Hymn	6	Brian Hughes	Malcolm Jefferson
2015	Caracci Apache	5	Nico de Boinville	Nicky Henderson
2016	Barters Hill	6	David Bass	Ben Pauling
2017	Constantine Bay	6	Jeremiah McGrath	Nicky Henderson
2018	Enniscoffey Oscar	6	Leighton Aspell	Emma Lavelle
2019	Nadaitak	5	Nico de Boinville	Ben Pauling
2020	Ramses De Teillee	8	Tom Scudamore	David Pipe
2021	The Cob	7	Daryl Jacob	Ben Pauling
2022	Mahler Mission	6	James Bowen	John McConnell
2023	Maximilian	7	Brian Hughes	Donald McCain
2024	Kerryhill	6	Brian Hughes	Ruth Jefferson
2025	Yellow Car	7	Nick Slatter	David Killahena & Graeme McPherson
2026	Thedeviluno	7	Sean O'Keeffe	Paul Nolan

== See also ==
- Horseracing in Great Britain
- List of British National Hunt races
