= Refuse To Bend =

Irish-bred Thoroughbred racehorse

- Sire: Sadler's Wells
- Grandsire: Northern Dancer
- Dam: Market Slide
- Damsire: Gulch
- Sex: Stallion
- Foaled: 17 March 2000
- Country: Ireland
- Colour: Bay
- Breeder: Moyglare Stud Farm
- Owner: Moyglare Stud Farm; Godolphin Racing (2004)
- Trainer: Dermot K. Weld; Saeed bin Suroor (2004)
- Record: 15: 7-0-1
- Earnings: £780,896

Major wins
- National Stakes (2002); Leopardstown 2,000 Guineas Trial (2003); 2000 Guineas (2003); Desmond Stakes (2003); Queen Anne Stakes (2004); Eclipse Stakes (2004)
- Last updated on 7 September 2007

Refuse To Bend (17 March 2000 – 10 February 2012) was a Thoroughbred racehorse and sire.

== Background ==
Refuse To Bend was a bay horse with a white star and white socks on his hind legs bred by his owner the Swiss businessman Walter Haefner at his Moyglare Stud Farm near the town of Maynooth, County Kildare, in Ireland. He was sired by the Champion Sire Sadler's Wells. His dam, Market Slide was a daughter of Gulch, the 1988 U.S. Champion Sprint Horse. Market Slide had previously produced the Melbourne Cup winner, Media Puzzle,

== Racing career ==
Refuse To Bend made his debut in August 2002 in Gowran, Ireland at Gowran Park, winning a Maiden race by four lengths. He then moved up to compete against top-level colts in the National Stakes at the Curragh Racecourse. A win in that race and another in the following spring's 2,000 Guineas Trial at Leopardstown Racecourse made him a contender for the 2003 British Classic Races.

Ridden by regular jockey Pat Smullen, Refuse To Bend won the first Classic of the 2003 season, the 2,000 Guineas at Newmarket Racecourse. Still undefeated, he started 11/4 favourite for the 2003 Epsom Derby as the betting favourite but finished thirteenth behind winner Kris Kin. Refuse To Bend went on to win the Group III Desmond Stakes but was unplaced in two other races. At the end of the year, he was sold to Sheikh Mohammed bin Rashid al Maktoum.

At age four, under trainer Saeed bin Suroor and jockey Frankie Dettori, Refuse To Bend came back to win two Group I races. He defeated Warrsan in the Eclipse Stakes at Sandown Park and in the Queen Anne Stakes, he beat both the top mare Soviet Song and the 2003 Breeders' Cup Mile champion, Six Perfections

== Stud record ==
Refuse to Bend was retired at the end of the 2004 racing season. He stood at Darley's Kildangan Stud, in Kildangan, County Kildare, Ireland and Whitsbury Manor Stud. Later he was transferred to Normandy. His first crop of foals were born in 2006. His most known offspring are the French-trained Group 1 winners Sarafina and Wavering.

Refuse To Bend died of a heart attack at the age of 12 at Haras du Logis in Normandy on 10 February 2012.

== Pedigree ==
Pedigree of Refuse To Bend (IRE) chestnut stallion 2000
Sire Sadler's Wells (USA) 1981	Northern Dancer (CAN); 1961	Nearctic	Nearco
Sire Sadler's Wells (USA) 1981	Northern Dancer (CAN); 1961	Nearctic	Lady Angela
Sire Sadler's Wells (USA) 1981	Northern Dancer (CAN); 1961	Natalma	Native Dancer
Sire Sadler's Wells (USA) 1981	Northern Dancer (CAN); 1961	Natalma	Almahmoud
Sire Sadler's Wells (USA) 1981	Fairy Bridge (USA). 1975	Bold Reason	Hail to Reason
Sire Sadler's Wells (USA) 1981	Fairy Bridge (USA). 1975	Bold Reason	Lalun
Sire Sadler's Wells (USA) 1981	Fairy Bridge (USA). 1975	Special	Forli
Sire Sadler's Wells (USA) 1981	Fairy Bridge (USA). 1975	Special	Thong
Dam Market Slide (USA) 1991	Gulch (USA); 1984	Mr. Prospector	Raise a Native
Dam Market Slide (USA) 1991	Gulch (USA); 1984	Mr. Prospector	Gold Digger
Dam Market Slide (USA) 1991	Gulch (USA); 1984	Jameela	Rambunctious
Dam Market Slide (USA) 1991	Gulch (USA); 1984	Jameela	Asbury Mary
Dam Market Slide (USA) 1991	Grenzen (USA); 1975	Grenfall	Graustark
Dam Market Slide (USA) 1991	Grenzen (USA); 1975	Grenfall	Primonetta
Dam Market Slide (USA) 1991	Grenzen (USA); 1975	My Poly	Cyclotron
Dam Market Slide (USA) 1991	Grenzen (USA); 1975	My Poly	Polywich (family: 10-a)
