= Kris Kin =

American-bred Thoroughbred racehorse

- Racing colours of Saeed Suhail
- Sire: Kris S.
- Grandsire: Roberto
- Dam: Angel in my Heart
- Damsire: Rainbow Quest
- Sex: Stallion
- Foaled: 5 March 2000
- Country: United States
- Colour: Chestnut
- Breeder: Flaxman Holdings Ltd
- Owner: Saeed Suhail
- Trainer: Sir Michael Stoute
- Record: 7: 3-0-2
- Earnings: £991,379

Major wins
- Dee Stakes (2003); Epsom Derby (2003)
- Last updated on August 24, 2007

Kris Kin (5 March 2000 – 31 August 2012) was a thoroughbred race horse and active sire. He was bred in the United States but was trained in England during his racing career. In a career that lasted just over a year, from October 2002 to October 2003, he ran seven times and won three races, most notably The Derby in 2003. Kris Kin stood as a stallion in Italy, before being exported to stand in Libya, where he died in 2012.

== Background ==
Kris Kin was a chestnut horse, bred in Kentucky by Flaxman Holdings Ltd, the American breeding division of the Niarchos family's racing interests.

He was sired by Kris S. a son of Roberto out of the Rainbow Quest mare Angel In My Heart. Apart from Kris Kin, Kris S. sired the winners of more than 20 Group One/Grade I races, including Symboli Kris S (Arima Kinen, Tenno Sho), Brocco (Breeders' Cup Juvenile) and Dr Fong. (St. James's Palace Stakes). Angel In My Heart won the Group Three Prix de Psyché in 1995 and was placed in the Yellow Ribbon Stakes and the Matriarch Stakes. She was a half-sister of the Prix de la Salamandre winner Common Grounds.

On 12 September 2001 (the sale was delayed by one day owing to the September 11 attacks), the unnamed yearling was sold for $275,000 at Keeneland to the bloodstock agent Charles Gordon-Watson acting on behalf of Saeed Suhail.

He was sent into training as a two-year-old with Sir Michael Stoute at Newmarket.

== Racing career ==
=== 2002: two-year-old season ===
Kris Kin did not appear on a racecourse until October 2002. Ridden by Johnny Murtagh, he started at 20-1 and made no impression, finishing fifteenth of the twenty-six runners in a maiden race at Newmarket. Three weeks later he showed much improved form to win a maiden race at Doncaster, taking the lead a furlong from the finish and going clear to win by two and a half lengths.

=== 2003: three-year-old season ===
==== Spring ====
On his three-year-old debut, Kris Kin was stepped up significantly in class to contest the Group Three Dee Stakes, a recognised trial for the Derby, run at Chester. His unexceptional two-year-old form led to him being sent off the outsider of the four runners, at odds of 20–1. Hampered in the early stages, and again when attempting to make a challenge, Kris Kin was switched to the outside, where he showed a surprising turn of acceleration to overtake his rivals and win by two lengths from the odds-on favourite, Big Bad Bob. The race had a dramatic aftermath, as Kris Kin veered to the right crossing the line, unseating his jockey Fergal Lynch, who had been waving his whip^{1} to the crowd in celebration. Saeed Suhail's racing manager, the former jockey Bruce Raymond, commented that "we didn't do such things in my day". Raymond also explained that it was difficult to assess the colt's true ability as he was an extremely lazy worker at home.

Kris Kin had originally been entered for the Derby, but his unpromising early form had persuaded his connections to allow his entry to lapse at one of the "forfeit" stages in October 2002. It was therefore necessary to pay a supplementary fee of £90,000 to re-enter him in the Classic. Plans were not immediately clear, and Kris Kin was also entered in the Prix du Jockey Club (the "French Derby") but the supplementary charge was paid, and the colt was added to the Derby field on 2 June 2003, five days before the race.

==== Summer ====
Two days before the Derby, Kris Kin's participation was placed in doubt, as he suffered a slight leg injury, but he recovered quickly after treatment and was allowed to run. At Epsom, the colt was strongly supported, being backed down from 14–1 to 6–1 on the course, with the money reportedly coming from ordinary members of the public rather than professional gamblers. He started the race as fourth favourite behind three Irish-trained colts, Refuse To Bend, Alamshar and Brian Boru.

Ridden for the first time by Kieren Fallon, Kris Kin seemed to be struggling in the early stages, and turned into the straight in eighth place. As at Chester, he began to make rapid progress after being switched to the outside, catching the leader, The Great Gatsby inside the final furlong and winning by a length. The winning time of 2:33.35 was the third fastest recorded in a Derby at Epsom. After the race Michael Stoute praised Fallon's riding, before echoing Raymond's comments after the Dee Stakes by calling Kiris Kin "one of the laziest horses at home I've ever trained."

A late withdrawal from the Irish Derby because of the unsuitably firm ground meant that Kris Kin had been off the course for more than seven weeks before his next start, the King George VI and Queen Elizabeth Diamond Stakes at Ascot. His home work had not improved- his lack of pace leading one commentator to refer to him as "an attractive piece of still life"- but there was some confidence behind him and he was made 7/2 second favourite. Held up in the early stages by Fallon, Kris Kin again appeared to be under pressure in the race, before staying on strongly. He finished third to Alamshar and Sulamani, but it was arguably his best run, as he finished ahead of proven top-class performers such as Nayef, Warrsan, Falbrav, Millenary and Grandera.

==== Autumn ====
In autumn, Kris Kin was aimed at the Prix de l'Arc de Triomphe at Longchamp, and first ran over the course and distance in the Prix Niel. He stayed on strongly in the straight but again finished third, this time behind Dalakhani and Doyen. Stoute felt that the colt would improve from the race, whilst Fallon was reported to be "unhappy" about the tactics of one of the French riders, who had kept him boxed against the rails at a crucial stage.

In the Arc, he made little impression, and after being hampered on the turn into the straight, was eased down in the closing stages, finishing eleventh of the thirteen runners behind Dalakhani. His retirement was announced three days after his run in the Arc.

== Race record ==
Date	Race	Dist (f)	Course	Class	Prize (£K)	Odds	Runners	Placing	Margin	Time	Jockey	Trainer
3 October 2002	Unfuwain EBF Maiden Stakes	7	Newmarket-Rowley	M	7	20/1	26	15	14.5	1:24.71	Johnny Murtagh	Michael Stoute
25 October 2002	Weatherbys Bank EBF Maiden Stakes	7	Doncaster	M	5	5/1	12	1	2.5	1:35.36	Fergal Lynch	Michael Stoute
8 May 2003	Dee Stakes	10	Chester	3	43	20/1	4	1	2	2:10.11	Fergal Lynch	Michael Stoute
7 June 2003	Derby	12	Epsom	1	852	6/1	20	1	1	2:33.35	Kieren Fallon	Michael Stoute
26 July 2003	King George VI & Queen Elizabeth Stakes	12	Ascot	1	435	7/2	12	3	5.5	2:33.26	Kieren Fallon	Michael Stoute
14 September 2003	Prix Niel	12	Longchamp	2	40	11/4	7	3	4	2:27.60	Kieren Fallon	Michael Stoute
5 October 2003	Prix de l'Arc de Triomphe	12	Longchamp	1	593	11/1	13	11	45	2:32.30	Kieren Fallon	Michael Stoute

.

== Assessment ==
Kris Kin has been considered to be one of the least distinguished winners of the Derby. John Randall, writing in the Racing Post rated him the fourth-worst Derby-winner since 1945.

In the 2003 World Thoroughbred Racehorse Rankings, Kris Kin was rated on 122, making him the equal fourth-best three-year-old colt in the world, ten pounds behind Dalakhani, and the equal of the Kentucky Derby winner Funny Cide. The rankings also made him the second best English-trained colt of his generation behind the sprinter Oasis Dream

An unusual tribute to Kris Kin is a "luxury" hotel in Dubai which bears his name.

== Stud career ==
After his retirement, he first stood as a sire at the Derrinstown Stud County Kildare, Ireland in 2004. His stud fee was reportedly €8,000. In October 2005 Kris Kin was moved to the Morristown Lattin Stud, near Naas, County Kildare, as a dual-purpose sire, intended to appeal to breeders of potential National Hunt horses. In November 2010 he was sold to the Allevamento I Mandorli in Italy, where he (September 2011) stood at a fee of €4,000

Kris Kin made little impact as a sire He did not sire the winner of a Group race, although his son Cima On Fly won the Listed Premio Merano at San Siro Racecourse at Milan in 2008. on 31 August 2012 he died instantly after breaking his neck while trying to jump a gate at the Al Shaab Stud near Tripoli.

== Pedigree ==
Pedigree of Kris Kin (USA), chestnut stallion, 2000
Sire Kris S. (USA) 1977	Roberto; 1969	Hail To Reason	Turn-To
Sire Kris S. (USA) 1977	Roberto; 1969	Hail To Reason	Nothirdchance
Sire Kris S. (USA) 1977	Roberto; 1969	Bramalea	Nashua
Sire Kris S. (USA) 1977	Roberto; 1969	Bramalea	Rarelea
Sire Kris S. (USA) 1977	Sharp Queen; 1965	Princequillo	Prince Rose
Sire Kris S. (USA) 1977	Sharp Queen; 1965	Princequillo	Cosquilla
Sire Kris S. (USA) 1977	Sharp Queen; 1965	Bridgework	Occupy
Sire Kris S. (USA) 1977	Sharp Queen; 1965	Bridgework	Feale Bridge
Dam Angel In My Heart (FRA) 1992	Rainbow Quest; 1981	Blushing Groom	Red God
Dam Angel In My Heart (FRA) 1992	Rainbow Quest; 1981	Blushing Groom	Runaway Bride
Dam Angel In My Heart (FRA) 1992	Rainbow Quest; 1981	I Will Follow	Herbager
Dam Angel In My Heart (FRA) 1992	Rainbow Quest; 1981	I Will Follow	Where You Lead
Dam Angel In My Heart (FRA) 1992	Sweetly; 1975	Lyphard	Northern Dancer
Dam Angel In My Heart (FRA) 1992	Sweetly; 1975	Lyphard	Goofed
Dam Angel In My Heart (FRA) 1992	Sweetly; 1975	Sweet And Lovely	Tanerko
Dam Angel In My Heart (FRA) 1992	Sweetly; 1975	Sweet And Lovely	Lilya (Family: 7-a)

== Note ==
^{1} Other sources say that Lynch was punching the air.
