= Liam Ward =

Irish jockey (1930–2022)

Liam Ward (18 May 1930 – 4 October 2022) was an Irish jockey who competed in flat racing. He was Irish flat racing Champion Jockey six times and rode for leading trainers Paddy Prendergast and Vincent O'Brien. He was particularly noted for riding two of O'Brien's champions, Sir Ivor and Nijinsky, in all their races in Ireland.

== Major wins ==
- Irish Derby – (2) – Sindon (1958), Nijinsky (1970)
- Irish Two Thousand Guineas – (1) – D.C.M. (1952)
- Irish One Thousand Guineas – (1) – Zenobia (1960)
- Irish Oaks – (3) – Amante (1958), Aurabella (1965), Gaia (1969)
- Irish St Leger – (3) – Do Well (1951), White Gloves (1966), Reindeer (1969)
- Irish Champion Stakes – (2) – Do Well (1951), March Wind (1962)
- Pretty Polly Stakes – (3) – Atlantida (1956), Iskereen (1967), Rimark (1968)
- National Stakes – (2) – Mystery (1961), Sir Ivor (1967)
