= Mistigri (horse) =

British-bred Thoroughbred racehorse

- Sire: Misti
- Grandsire: Medium
- Dam: Nyanga
- Damsire: Never Say Die
- Sex: Stallion
- Foaled: 28 February 1971
- Country: United Kingdom
- Colour: Bay
- Breeder: Dollanstown Stud
- Owner: Edward Roger "Rory" More O'Ferrall
- Trainer: Paddy Prendergast; Charles Bartholomew
- Record: 24: 4-5-2

Major wins
- Irish St. Leger (1974); Desmond Stakes (1975)

Awards
- Timeform rating 121 (1974), 125 (1975), 121 (1976)

Mistigri (28 February 1971 – 1995) was a British-bred Thoroughbred racehorse and sire. A specialist stayer who competed in at least five countries, he was campaigned for four seasons from 1973 to 1976 and won four of his 24 races. His two major successes came when he won the Irish St. Leger as a three-year-old and the Desmond Stakes a year later. He was placed in several other good races and looked unlucky to be disqualified after finishing second in the Ascot Gold Cup. After his retirement from racing he had some success as a sire of steeplechase horses.

== Background ==
Mistigri was a bay horse with a white star and snip and four short white socks bred in the United Kingdom by the Irish-based Dollanstown Stud. As a yearling he was put up for auction and sold for 1,500 guineas. During his racing career he was owned by Rory More O'Ferrall and was initially trained by Paddy Prendergast at the Curragh in County Kildare.

He was sired by Misti (also known a Mist IV), a top-class middle distance performer and stayer who won the Prix Ganay and Gran Premio del Jockey Club as well as being placed in the Ascot Gold Cup and Prix de l'Arc de Triomphe. Misti was a representative of the Byerley Turk sire line, unlike more than 95% of modern thoroughbreds, who descend directly from the Darley Arabian. Mistigri's dam Nyanga, who won two races in a France, was a great-great-granddaughter of the outstanding broodmare Athasi, whose other descendants include Trigo, Tulyar and Time Charter. Nyanga herself went on to produce the Cesarewitch winner Bajan Sunshine.

== Racing career ==
=== 1973: two-year-old season ===
Mistigri made two appearances as a two-year-old, finishing unplaced on his debut and then winning a race over seven furlongs. His form was not good enough for him to be assigned an eight in the Irish Free Handicap, a ranking of the season's best juveniles.

=== 1974: three-year-old season ===
As a three-year-old Mistigri was consistently tested against top-class opposition. On his seasonal debut he was sent to England for the Dee Stakes over ten and a half furlongs at Chester Racecourse in May. He led for most of the way before being overtaken in the closing stages and beaten a neck into second place by the Clive Brittain-trained Averof. He was then stepped up to the highest class to contest the 195th edition of The Derby and exceeded expectations as he finished sixth behind Snow Knight, Imperial Prince, Giacometti, Bustino and Northern Taste. He ran poorly when coming home tenth behind English Prince in the Irish Derby at the Curragh on 29 June and then finished runner-up to the Vincent O'Brien-trained Sir Penfro in the Desmond Stakes at the same track a month later. In the Blandford Stakes at the Curragh in August he finished third to the O'Brien-trained Richard Grenville and Conor Pass, beaten four and a half lengths by the winner.

The Irish St. Leger was run over 14 furlongs on soft ground at the Curragh on 21 September and attracted a field of seven three-year-old colts. Richard Grenville was made the odds-on favourite ahead of the British challenger Franconian, with Mistigri, ridden by Christy Roche, the third choice in the betting on 9/1. Roche tracked the favourite before moving up to challenge for the lead in the straight. Mistigri (who was equipped with blinkers for the race), took the lead and drew away to win "in good style" by four lengths from Richard Grenville with five lengths back to Lawrence T in third.

Mistigri was campaigned internationally in his last two races of 1974. He finished fourth to Authi in the Gran Premio del Jockey Club over 2400 metres in Milan and then came home eighth of the nine runners behind Admetus in the Washington, D.C.International. For his performances in 1974 he was given a rating of 121 by the independent Timeform organisation, making him seven pounds inferior to their best stayer Ragstone and ten pounds behind Nonoalco, Sagaro, Dankaro and Caracolero who were jointly-rated the best three-year-old colts.

=== 1975: four-year-old season ===
After finishing runner-up over one and a half miles on his four-year-old debut Mistigri was stepped up in distance and sent to France for the Prix Jean Prat over 1500 metres at Longchamp Racecourse on 27 April. Ridden by Yves Saint-Martin he was beaten a short head by Le Bavard, to whom he was conceding four pounds in weight. Four weeks later he returned to Longchamp for the Group 1 Prix du Cadran over 2400 metres in which he was ridden by Willie Carson and finished fourth behind Le Bavard, Busiris and Sagaro. In June the colt was sent to Royal Ascot of the two and a half mile Ascot Gold Cup. He proved no match for Sagaro but finished in a clear second place ahead of Le Bavard. In a controversial decision by the racecourse stewards, Mistigri was disqualified and placed last for causing interference to Le Bavard in the straight.

Having hewn his best form over extended distances, Mistigri was given little chance when dropped back to ten furlongs for the Desmond Stakes at the Curragh in August. Racing without blinkers, he produced and upset as he prevailed in a close finish from the highly rated three-year-olds Donna Cressida and Imperial March. He finished unplaced in his only subsequent start in 1975. At the end of the year he was given a rating of 125 by Timeform, four pounds behind Sagaro and seven behind Bruni who was named the best stayer of the season.

=== 1976: five-year-old season ===
For the 1976 season, Mistigri was transferred to France, where he was trained by Charle Bartholomew. In the spring he finished second to Sagaro in the Prix de Barbeville, seventh in the Prix Jean Prat and fourth in the Prix du Cadran. In June he made a second bid for the Ascot Gold Cup and finished fourth behind Sagaro, Crash Course and Sea Anchor. At Saint-Cloud Racecourse the following month he recorded his only success of the season as he won minor race over 2400 metres against to opponents. He finished third in the Prix de Reux in August but was unplaced in his last two starts. Timeform gave him a rating of 121 for the season.

== Stud record ==
Mitigri was retired from racing to become a breeding stallion in France. His progeny made little impact on the flat but he was more successful as a sire of steeplechasers. Through his non-Thoroughbred daughter Peanuts, he was the damsire of Barton.

== Pedigree ==
Pedigree of Mistigri (GB), bay stallion, 1971
Sire Misti (FR) 1958	Medium (FR); 1946	Meridien	Tourbillon*
Sire Misti (FR) 1958	Medium (FR); 1946	Meridien	Meriem
Sire Misti (FR) 1958	Medium (FR); 1946	Melodie	Monarch
Sire Misti (FR) 1958	Medium (FR); 1946	Melodie	Mitidja
Sire Misti (FR) 1958	Mist (FR); 1953	Tornado	Tourbillon*
Sire Misti (FR) 1958	Mist (FR); 1953	Tornado	Roseola
Sire Misti (FR) 1958	Mist (FR); 1953	La Touche	Rienzo
Sire Misti (FR) 1958	Mist (FR); 1953	La Touche	La Rasina
Dam Nyanga (FR) 1963	Never Say Die (USA); 1951	Nasrullah	Nearco
Dam Nyanga (FR) 1963	Never Say Die (USA); 1951	Nasrullah	Mumtaz Begum
Dam Nyanga (FR) 1963	Never Say Die (USA); 1951	Singing Grass	War Admiral
Dam Nyanga (FR) 1963	Never Say Die (USA); 1951	Singing Grass	Boreale
Dam Nyanga (FR) 1963	Picaresque (FR); 1954	Cranach	Coronach
Dam Nyanga (FR) 1963	Picaresque (FR); 1954	Cranach	Reine Isaure
Dam Nyanga (FR) 1963	Picaresque (FR); 1954	Laura	Dante
Dam Nyanga (FR) 1963	Picaresque (FR); 1954	Laura	Avena (Family:22-a)

* Mistigri is inbred 4S x 4S to the stallion Tourbillon, meaning that he appears fourth generation twice on the sire side of his pedigree.
