= Jimmy Eddery =

Irish jockey

Personal information
- Born: 25 July 1922 Doneraile, County Cork, Ireland
- Died: 26 August 1988 (aged 66) Newmarket, Suffolk, England
- Occupation: Jockey

Horse racing career
- Sport: Horse racing

Major racing wins
- Irish Classic races: Irish Derby (1955); Irish Oaks (1958); Irish 2,000 Guineas (1944 – dh, 1945); Major British races: St. James's Palace Stakes (1957)

Racing awards
- Irish flat racing Champion Jockey (1954, 1955)

Significant horses
- Chevastrid, Panaslipper
- Updated on 26 October 2023

Jimmy Eddery (1922–1988) was an Irish jockey, who won the 1955 Irish Derby and was twice Irish flat racing Champion Jockey. He was also father of several jockey sons, of whom Pat was most successful, becoming champion on both sides of the Irish Sea.

== Career ==
James Eddery was born in Doneraile, Co. Cork on 25 July 1922, one of several jockey brothers, of whom he was the most successful. He served his apprenticeship with Atty Persse in Hampshire, before returning home to Ireland at the start of World War II, having immediate success for trainers like Fred Myerscough.

In 1944, he dead-heated for the Irish 2,000 Guineas on Good Morning and the Irish Cambridgeshire on Dawros. He won the former outright the following year on Stalino. In 1946, he succeeded Morny Wing as first jockey to Seamus McGrath.

He was successful on Panaslipper in the 1955 Irish Derby, having been beaten into second at 100/1 in the Epsom equivalent. In 1957, he won the St. James's Palace Stakes on Chevastrid for the McGraths, beating Tempest by a head. The same year, he was beaten a short head on Carrozza (for the Queen) in the English Oaks and won the Irish Oaks on Silken Glider. He retired from riding in 1959, and stayed with McGrath as assistant trainer, along with his brother Connie, who was travelling head lad.

His sons Patrick, Paul, Michael and David became jockeys, with Pat following in his father's footsteps as Irish champion in 1982 and becoming the first Irish born British flat racing Champion Jockey. He died on 26 August 1988, aged 66 and is buried in Newmarket town cemetery.

== Style and reputation ==
Jimmy Eddery was known for riding winners by "force rather than persuasion". Aubrey Brabazon wrote in his autobiography, "Jimmy was a terrible butcher on horse-back and I am certainly not alone in stating that he ruined a lot of good McGrath horses over the years. He wouldn't survive too long if he was riding today with the new whip rules."

== Major wins ==
(United Kingdom) Great Britain

- St. James's Palace Stakes – Chevastrid (1957)

(Republic of Ireland) Ireland

- Irish Derby – Panaslipper (1955)
- Irish Oaks – Silken Glider (1958)
- Irish 2,000 Guineas – Good Morning (1944 – dead heat), Stalino (1945)

== See also ==
- List of jockeys
