= Christy Roche =

Irish jockey and racehorse trainer

Personal information
- Born: 3 December 1949 (age 76) Bansha, County Tipperary, Ireland
- Occupations: Jockey, Trainer

Horse racing career
- Sport: Horse racing

Major racing wins
- As a jockey: Irish Classic Races; Irish 1,000 Guineas (1976, 1978, 1995); Irish 2,000 Guineas (1972, 1980, 1985, 1997); Irish Derby (1982, 1992, 1997); Irish St. Leger (1974, 1986); British Classic Races; Derby Stakes (1984); Oaks Stakes (1991); Other major races: Fillies' Mile (1975); International Stakes (1993); Irish Champion Stakes (1982); Matron Stakes (1989); Prix de l'Abbaye de Longchamp (1987); Prix de la Forêt (1982); Prix du Jockey Club (1982); Prix Jean-Luc Lagardère (1984); Tattersalls Gold Cup (1980); Vincent O'Brien National Stakes (1997); William Hill Futurity (1978); Yorkshire Oaks (1976)

Significant horses
- Assert, Authaal, Ballymore, Desert King, Jet Ski Lady, King of Kings, Mistigri, More So, Nikoli, Ridgewood Pearl, Sandy Creek, Sarah Siddons, Secreto, St Jovite, Triptych
- Updated on 21 January 2022

Christy Roche (born 3 December 1949 in Bansha, County Tipperary) is a retired Irish flat racing Champion Jockey and racehorse trainer.

Over his thirty-year career between 1968 and 1998 he won the Irish Derby three times, in 1982, 1992 and 1997. His 1997 victory was on Desert King. In Britain he won the Epsom Derby on Secreto in 1984 and the Epsom Oaks on Jet Ski Lady in 1991.

By the time of his retirement as a jockey Roche had already begun a career as a trainer. Amongst the major winners he trained were Like-A-Butterfly in the 2002 Supreme Novices' Hurdle and Grimes in the 2001 Galway Plate. He retired as a trainer in January 2018 and handed over his training licence to his son, Padraig.

== Major wins (as a jockey) ==
(United Kingdom) Great Britain

- Derby Stakes - Secreto (1984)
- Fillies' Mile - Icing (1975)
- International Stakes - Ivory Frontier (1993)
- Oaks Stakes - Jet Ski Lady (1991)
- William Hill Futurity - Sandy Creek (1978)
- Yorkshire Oaks - Sarah Siddons (1976)

(Republic of Ireland) Ireland

- Irish 1,000 Guineas - (3) - Sarah Siddons (1976), More So (1978), Ridgewood Pearl (1995)
- Irish 2,000 Guineas - (4) - Ballymore (1972), Nikoli (1980), Triptych (1985), Desert King (1997)
- Irish Champion Stakes - Assert (1982)
- Irish Derby - (3) - Assert (1982), St Jovite (1992), Desert King (1997)
- Irish St. Leger - (2) - Mistigri (1974), Authaal (1986)
- Matron Stakes - Upward Trend (1989)
- Tattersalls Gold Cup - Noelino (1980)
- Vincent O'Brien National Stakes - King of Kings (1997)

France

- Prix de l'Abbaye de Longchamp - Polonia (1987)
- Prix de la Forêt - Pas de Seul (1982)
- Prix du Jockey Club - Assert (1982)
- Prix Jean-Luc Lagardère - Alydar's Best (1984)

Italy

- Oaks d'Italia - Ivyanna (1992)

== See also ==
- List of jockeys
