= King George V Cup =

Flat horse race in Ireland

- Class: Listed
- Location: Leopardstown; County Dublin, Ireland
- Race type: Flat / Thoroughbred
- Website: Leopardstown

Race information
- Distance: 1m 4f (2,413 metres)
- Surface: Turf
- Track: Left-handed
- Qualification: Three-year-olds*; *Excluding G1 / G2 winners
- Weight: 9 st 5 lb Allowances; 3 lb for fillies Penalties; 5 lb for G3 winners* 3 lb for Listed winners* *from 1 July 2024
- Purse: €45,000 (2025); 1st: €26,550

King George V Cup
2026
Endorsement	Amadeus Mozart	Yousaynothingatall

Previous years
2025
Zahrann	Arouet	Acapulco Bay
2024
Portland	Kinesiology	Keeper's Heart
2023
Tower Of London	Shamwari	Thunder Roll
2022
Cairde Go Deo	Boundless Ocean	Inuit
2021
Fernando Vichi	The Mediterranean	Ruling

2020-2011
2020
Delphi	Numen	Aunt Bee
2019
Rakan	Barbados	Eminent Authority
2018
Giuseppe Garibaldi	Cimeara	Lucius Tiberius
2017
Grandee	Eziyra	Percy
2016
The Major General	Claudio Monteverdi	Lieutenant General
2015
Radanpour	Morning Mix	Bondi Beach
2014
Roheryn	Streetcar To Stars	Sinkal
2013
Dibayani	Count Of Limonade	Seussical
2012
Backbench Blues	Macbeth	Karatash
2011
Laughing	Notable Graduate	Haziyna

2010-2008
2010
Rose Hip	Shintoh	Sebastian Flyte
2009
Shreyas	Fiery Lad	Festival Princess
2008
Navajo Moon	One Great Cat	Mr Medici

The King George V Cup is a Listed flat horse race in Ireland open to horses aged three years only. It is run at Leopardstown over a distance of 1 mile and 4 furlongs (2,413 metres), and it is scheduled to take place each year in June.

The race was first run in 2008 as the Nijinsky Stakes, before being renamed the King George V Cup in 2013. The race reverted to its original title in 2020 and 2021 before changing to the King George V Cup again from the 2022 running.

== Records ==
Leading jockey (3 wins):

- Ryan Moore - Tower of London (2023), Portland (2024), Endorsement (2026)

Leading trainer (6 wins):

- Aidan O'Brien – The Major General (2016), Giuseppe Garibaldi (2018), Delphi (2020), Tower of London (2023), Portland (2024), Endorsement (2026)

== Winners ==
Year	Winner	Jockey	Trainer	Time
2008	Navajo Moon	Danny Grant	David Wachman	1:54.13
2009	Shreyas	Kevin Manning	Jim Bolger	1:52.29
2010	Rose Hip	Chris Hayes	Joseph G Murphy	1:52.58
2011	Laughing	Wayne Lordan	Charles O'Brien	2:22.32
2012	Backbench Blues	Fran Berry	Jessica Harrington	2:32.33
2013	Dibayani	Declan McDonogh	Michael Halford	2:19.01
2014	Roheryn	Colin Keane	Ger Lyons	2:36.45
2015	Radanpour	Pat Smullen	Dermot Weld	2:37.04
2016	The Major General	Michael Hussey	Aidan O'Brien	2:39.41
2017	Grandee	Colm O'Donoghue	Jessica Harrington	2:38.34
2018	Giuseppe Garibaldi	Donnacha O'Brien	Aidan O'Brien	2:34.45
2019	Rakan	Chris Hayes	Dermot Weld	2:39.98
2020	Delphi (Note: The 2020 race was run in July due to the COVID-19 pandemic in the Republic of Ireland)	Wayne Lordan	Aidan O'Brien	2:39.13
2021	Fernando Vichi	Gavin Ryan	Donnacha O'Brien	2:35.38
2022	Cairde Go Deo	Colin Keane	Ger Lyons	2:43.69
2023	Tower of London	Ryan Moore	Aidan O'Brien	2:42.60
2024	Portland	Ryan Moore	Aidan O'Brien	2:38.87
2025	Zahrann	Ben Coen	Johnny Murtagh	2:34.63
2026	Endorsement	Ryan Moore	Aidan O'Brien	2:42.50

== See also ==
- Horse racing in Ireland
- List of Irish flat horse races
