= Enstone Spark =

British Thoroughbred racehorse

- Sire: Sparkler
- Grandsire: Hard Tack
- Dam: Laxmi
- Damsire: Palestine
- Sex: Filly
- Foaled: 1975
- Country: Great Britain
- Colour: Bay
- Breeder: Whitsbury Manor Stud
- Owner: Dick Bonnycastle
- Trainer: Richard Hannon, Sr. Barry Hills
- Record: 14: 5-3-0
- Earnings: £54,680

Major wins
- Lowther Stakes (1977); 1,000 Guineas Stakes (1978); Timeform rating: 119
- Last updated on 27 July 2022

Enstone Spark (foaled 6 June 1975) was a British-bred Thoroughbred racehorse. She is best known for winning the classic 1000 Guineas in 1978.

== Racing career ==
Trained by Barry Hills, at age two, Enstone Spark won the 1977 Lowther Stakes at York Racecourse. In 1978, her Canadian owner, Dick Bonnycastle, was planning to ship Enstone Spark to race in California but an outbreak of contagious equine metritis forced a change of plans and she remained to compete in England.

In 1978 Enstone Spark earned the most important win of her career at Newmarket Racecourse with a victory in the Classic 1,000 Guineas Stakes, ridden by Ernie Johnson. It came when she was still more than a month shy of her third birthday.

== Stud record ==
Retired from racing a winner of five races with three second-place finishes in her two years of racing, Enstone Spark was assigned to broodmare duty. Bred to stallions such as Affirmed, Roberto, and Bold Forbes, her offspring were not successful in racing.
