= Irish Derby =

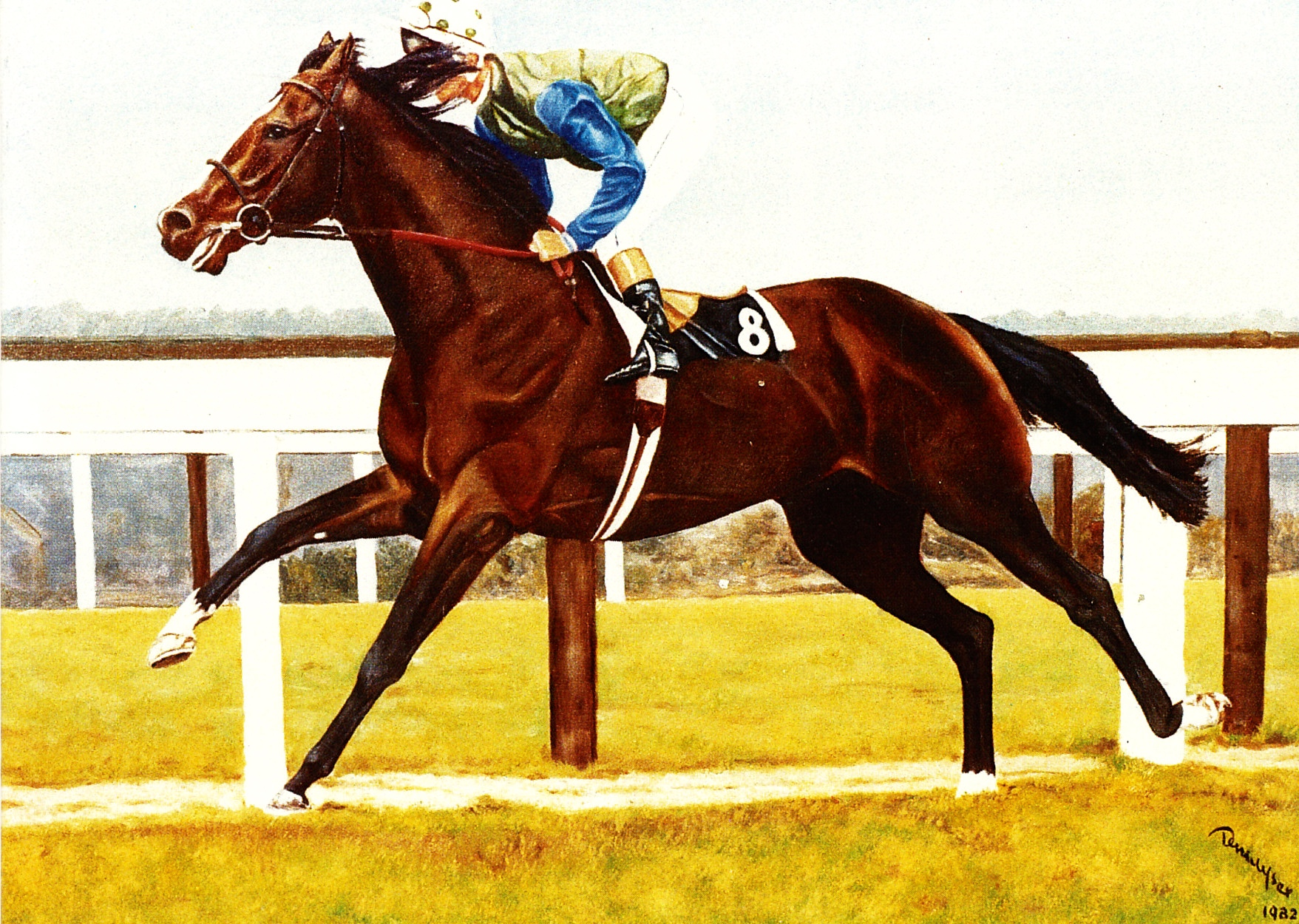
- Assert, oil on canvas Painting by Bob Demuyser (1920-2003)
- Class: Group 1
- Location: Curragh Racecourse; County Kildare, Ireland
- Inaugurated: 1866
- Race type: Flat / Thoroughbred
- Sponsor: Dubai Duty Free
- Website: Curragh

Race information
- Distance: 1m 4f (2,414 metres)
- Surface: Turf
- Track: Right-handed
- Qualification: Three-year-olds excluding geldings
- Weight: 9 st 0 lb Allowances; 3 lb for fillies
- Purse: €1,000,000 (2022); 1st: €580,000

Irish Derby
2026
| Benvenuto Cellini | Christmas Day | Pierre Bonnard |

Previous years
2025
Lambourn | Serious Contender | Lazy Griff
2024
Los Angeles | Sunway | Ambiente Friendly
2023
Auguste Rodin | Adelaide River | Covent Garden
2022
Westover | Piz Badile | French Claim
2021
Hurricane Lane | Lone Eagle | Wordsworth

2020-2011
2020
Santiago | Tiger Moth | Dawn Patrol
2019
Sovereign | Anthony Van Dyck | Norway
2018
Latrobe | Rostropovich | Saxon Warrior
2017
Capri | Cracksman | Wings Of Eagles
2016
Harzand | Idaho | Stellar Mass
2015
Jack Hobbs | Storm The Stars | Giovanni Canaletto
2014
Australia | Kingfisher | Orchestra
2013
Trading Leather | Galileo Rock | Festive Cheer
2012
Camelot | Born To Sea | Light Heavy
2011
Treasure Beach | Seville | Memphis Tennessee

2010-2001
2010
Cape Blanco | Midas Touch | Jan Vermeer
2009
Fame And Glory | Golden Sword | Mourayan
2008
Frozen Fire | Casual Conquest | Tartan Bearer
2007
Soldier of Fortune | Alexander Of Hales | Eagle Mountain
2006
Dylan Thomas | Gentlewave | Best Alibi
2005
Hurricane Run | Scorpion | Shalapour
2004
Grey Swallow | North Light | Tycoon
2003
Alamshar | Dalakhani | Roosevelt
2002
High Chaparral | Sholokhov | Ballingarry
2001
Galileo | Morshdi | Golan

2000-1991
2000
Sinndar | Glyndebourne | Ciro
1999
Montjeu | Daliapour | Tchaikovsky
1998
Dream Well | City Honours | Desert Fox
1997
Desert King | Dr Johnson | Loup Sauvage
1996
Zagreb | Polaris Flight | His Excellence
1995
Winged Love | Definite Article | Annus Mirabilis
1994
Balanchine | King's Theatre | Colonel Collins
1993
Commander In Chief | Hernando | Foresee
1992
St Jovite | Dr Devious | Contested Bid
1991
Generous | Suave Dancer | Star Of Gdansk

1990-1980
1990
Salsabil | Deploy | Belmez
1989
Old Vic | Observation Post | Ile De Nisky
1988
Kahyasi | Insan | Glacial Storm
1987
Sir Harry Lewis | Naheez | Entitled
1986
Shahrastani | Bonhomie | Bakharoff
1985
Law Society | Theatrical | Damister
1984
El Gran Senor | Rainbow Quest | Dahar
1983
Shareef Dancer | Caerleon | Teenoso
1982
Assert | Silver Hawk | Patcher
1981
Shergar | Cut Above | Dance Bid
1980
Tyrnavos | Prince Bee | Ramian

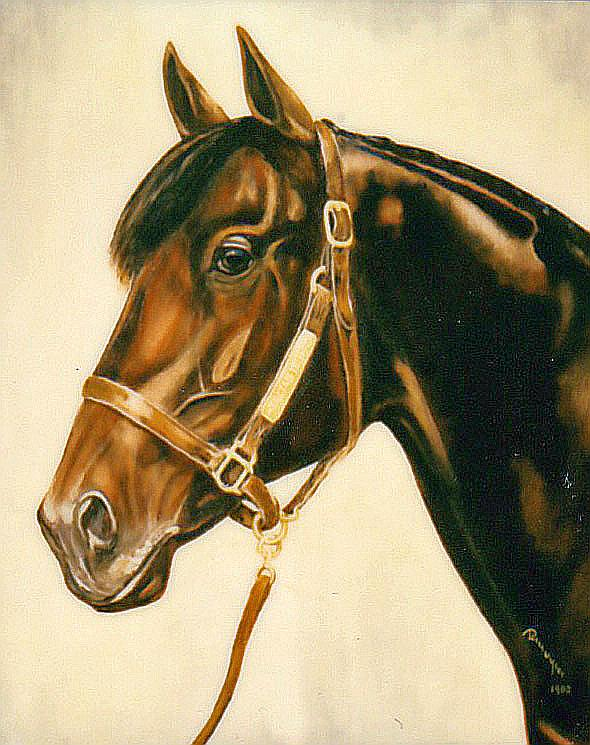
Shirley Heights, Derby winner by Bob Demuyser (1920–2003)

The Irish Derby (Irish: Dearbaí na hÉireann) is a Group 1 flat horse race in Ireland open to three-year-old thoroughbred colts and fillies. It is run at the Curragh over a distance of 1 mile and 4 furlongs (2,414 metres), and it is scheduled to take place each year in late June or early July.

It is Ireland's equivalent of the Derby Stakes, and it is usually held four weeks after the English race.

== History ==
The earliest version of the Irish Derby was an event called the O'Darby Stakes. This was established in 1817, but it was discontinued after 1824. A subsequent race titled the Curragh Derby was inaugurated in 1848, but this was again short-lived.

The modern Irish Derby was created by the 3rd Earl of Howth, the 3rd Marquess of Drogheda and the 3rd Earl of Charlemont. It was first run in 1866, and it was initially contested over 1 mile, 6 furlongs and 3 yards. It was extended by 9 yards in 1869, and cut to its present distance in 1872. The first Epsom Derby winner to achieve victory in the Irish version was Orby, trained in Ireland by Fred McCabe, in 1907.

The Irish Derby became a major international race in 1962, when its prize money was substantially increased. Joe McGrath, a founder of the Irish Hospitals' Sweepstake, combined the race with the sweepstake, and it became known as the Irish Sweeps Derby. The event began to regularly attract the winners of the Epsom Derby, and Santa Claus became the second horse to win both races in 1964.

The Irish Derby was sponsored by Budweiser from 1986 to 2007, and it has been backed by Dubai Duty Free since 2008. It is currently staged on the third day of the Curragh's three-day Irish Derby Festival meeting.

Twenty horses have now completed the English-Irish Derby double, and the most recent was Lambourn in 2025.

== Records ==
Leading jockey (6 wins):

- Morny Wing – Ballyheron (1921), Waygood (1923), Rock Star (1930), Rosewell (1938), Windsor Slipper (1942), Bright News (1946)

Leading trainer (18 wins):

- Aidan O'Brien – Desert King (1997), Galileo (2001), High Chaparral (2002), Dylan Thomas (2006), Soldier of Fortune (2007), Frozen Fire (2008), Fame and Glory (2009), Cape Blanco (2010), Treasure Beach (2011), Camelot (2012), Australia (2014), Capri (2017), Sovereign (2019), Santiago (2020),Auguste Rodin (2023), Los Angeles (2024), Lambourn (2025), Benvenuto Cellini (2026)

Leading owner (18 wins): (includes part ownership)

- Michael Tabor – Desert King (1997), Montjeu (1999), Galileo (2001), High Chaparral (2002), Dylan Thomas (2006), Soldier of Fortune (2007), Frozen Fire (2008), Fame and Glory (2009), Cape Blanco (2010), Treasure Beach (2011), Australia (2014), Capri (2017), Sovereign (2019), Santiago (2020),Auguste Rodin (2023), Los Angeles (2024), Lambourn (2025), Benvenuto Cellini (2026)

A Unique Racing Record - Only Owner to complete the Derby and Grand National Double

- William Brophy, Herbertstown House, Two-Mile-House, Naas, County Kildare. Farmer, Breeder and Owner

In 1880 William Brophy completed a unique double by owning the winner of both the Irish Derby with King of the Bees and the Irish Grand National with Controller. Also uniquely both winners were out of the same Dam Winged Bee.

== Winners since 1946 ==
| Year | Winner | Jockey | Trainer | Owner | Time |
|---|---|---|---|---|---|
| 1946 | Bright News | Morny Wing | Darby Rogers | James McVey junior |
| 1947 | Sayajirao | Edgar Britt | Sam Armstrong | HH Maharaja of Baroda |
| 1948 | Nathoo | Rae Johnstone | Frank Butters | Aga Khan III |
| 1949 | Hindostan | Rae Johnstone | Frank Butters | Aga Khan III |
| 1950 | Dark Warrior | Jack Thompson | Paddy Prendergast | Mr Francis More O'Ferrall |
| 1951 | Fraise du Bois II | Charlie Smirke | Harry Wragg | HH Begum Aga Khan |
| 1952 | Thirteen Of Diamonds | Jimmy Mullane | Paddy Prendergast | A L Hawkins |
| 1953 | Chamier^{[a]} | Bill Rickaby | Vincent O'Brien | Mrs F L Vickerson |
| 1954 | Zarathustra | Paddy Powell Jnr | Michael Hurley | Mr Terrence J S Gray |
| 1955 | Panaslipper | Jimmy Eddery | Seamus McGrath | Joseph McGrath |
| 1956 | Talgo | Manny Mercer | Harry Wragg | Gerald A Oldham |
| 1957 | Ballymoss | T. P. Burns | Vincent O'Brien | John McShain |
| 1958 | Sindon | Liam Ward | Michael Dawson | Anne B Biddle |
| 1959 | Fidalgo | Joe Mercer | Harry Wragg | Gerald A Oldham | 2:33.5 |
| 1960 | Chamour | Garnie Bougoure | Vincent O'Brien | F Walter Burmann | 2:37.5 |
| 1961 | Your Highness | Bert Holmes | Humphrey Cottrill | Mrs Gladys Stanhope Joel | 2:33.5 |
| 1962 | Tambourine | Roger Poincelet | Etienne Pollet | Mrs Howell Jackson | 2:28.80 |
| 1963 | Ragusa | Garnie Bougoure | Paddy Prendergast | Jim Mullion | 2:45.60 |
| 1964 | Santa Claus | Willie Burke | Mick Rogers | John Ismay | 2:35.60 |
| 1965 | Meadow Court | Lester Piggott | Paddy Prendergast | Bell / McMahon / Crosby | 2:46.80 |
| 1966 | Sodium | Frankie Durr | George Todd | Radha Sigtia | 2:31.50 |
| 1967 | Ribocco | Lester Piggott | Fulke Johnson Houghton | Charles Engelhard | 2:32.40 |
| 1968 | Ribero | Lester Piggott | Fulke Johnson Houghton | Charles Engelhard | 2:33.90 |
| 1969 | Prince Regent | Geoff Lewis | Etienne Pollet | Countess de la Valdène | 2:36.10 |
| 1970 | Nijinsky | Liam Ward | Vincent O'Brien | Charles Engelhard | 2:36.80 |
| 1971 | Irish Ball | Alfred Gibert | Philippe Lallié | Emile Littler | 2:33.80 |
| 1972 | Steel Pulse | Bill Williamson | Scobie Breasley | Ravi Tikkoo | 2:39.80 |
| 1973 | Weavers' Hall | George McGrath | Seamus McGrath | Seamus McGrath | 2:39.00 |
| 1974 | English Prince | Yves Saint-Martin | Peter Walwyn | Vera Hue-Williams | 2:33.40 |
| 1975 | Grundy | Pat Eddery | Peter Walwyn | Carlo Vittadini | 2:31.10 |
| 1976 | Malacate | Philippe Paquet | François Boutin | María Félix Berger | 2:31.20 |
| 1977 | The Minstrel | Lester Piggott | Vincent O'Brien | Robert Sangster | 2:32.00 |
| 1978 | Shirley Heights | Greville Starkey | John Dunlop | 2nd Earl of Halifax | 2:32.30 |
| 1979 | Troy | Willie Carson | Dick Hern | Sobell / Weinstock | 2:30.60 |
| 1980 | Tyrnavos | Tony Murray | Bruce Hobbs | George Cambanis | 2:43.80 |
| 1981 | Shergar | Lester Piggott | Michael Stoute | HH Aga Khan IV | 2:32.70 |
| 1982 | Assert | Christy Roche | David O'Brien | Robert Sangster | 2:33.20 |
| 1983 | Shareef Dancer | Walter Swinburn | Michael Stoute | Maktoum Al Maktoum | 2:29.40 |
| 1984 | El Gran Senor | Pat Eddery | Vincent O'Brien | Robert Sangster | 2:31.50 |
| 1985 | Law Society | Pat Eddery | Vincent O'Brien | Stavros Niarchos | 2:29.90 |
| 1986 | Shahrastani | Walter Swinburn | Michael Stoute | HH Aga Khan IV | 2:32.10 |
| 1987 | Sir Harry Lewis | John Reid | Barry Hills | Howard Kaskel | 2:40.20 |
| 1988 | Kahyasi | Ray Cochrane | Luca Cumani | HH Aga Khan IV | 2:32.50 |
| 1989 | Old Vic | Steve Cauthen | Henry Cecil | Sheikh Mohammed | 2:29.90 |
| 1990 | Salsabil | Willie Carson | John Dunlop | Hamdan Al Maktoum | 2:33.00 |
| 1991 | Generous | Alan Munro | Paul Cole | Prince Fahd bin Salman | 2:33.30 |
| 1992 | St Jovite | Christy Roche | Jim Bolger | Virginia Kraft Payson | 2:25.60 |
| 1993 | Commander in Chief | Pat Eddery | Henry Cecil | Khalid Abdullah | 2:31.20 |
| 1994 | Balanchine | Frankie Dettori | Hilal Ibrahim | Godolphin | 2:32.70 |
| 1995 | Winged Love | Olivier Peslier | André Fabre | Sheikh Mohammed | 2:30.10 |
| 1996 | Zagreb | Pat Shanahan | Dermot Weld | Allen Paulson | 2:30.60 |
| 1997 | Desert King | Christy Roche | Aidan O'Brien | Michael Tabor | 2:32.50 |
| 1998 | Dream Well | Cash Asmussen | Pascal Bary | Niarchos Family | 2:44.30 |
| 1999 | Montjeu | Cash Asmussen | John Hammond | Michael Tabor | 2:30.10 |
| 2000 | Sinndar | Johnny Murtagh | John Oxx | HH Aga Khan IV | 2:33.90 |
| 2001 | Galileo | Michael Kinane | Aidan O'Brien | Magnier / Tabor | 2:27.10 |
| 2002 | High Chaparral | Michael Kinane | Aidan O'Brien | Tabor / Magnier | 2:32.20 |
| 2003 | Alamshar | Johnny Murtagh | John Oxx | Aga Khan IV | 2:28.20 |
| 2004 | Grey Swallow | Pat Smullen | Dermot Weld | Rochelle Quinn | 2:28.70 |
| 2005 | Hurricane Run | Kieren Fallon | André Fabre | Gestut Ammerland | 2:29.40 |
| 2006 | Dylan Thomas | Kieren Fallon | Aidan O'Brien | Magnier / Tabor | 2:29.70 |
| 2007 | Soldier of Fortune | Seamie Heffernan | Aidan O'Brien | Magnier / Tabor / Smith | 2:36.02 |
| 2008 | Frozen Fire | Seamie Heffernan | Aidan O'Brien | Tabor / Smith / Magnier | 2:31.96 |
| 2009 | Fame and Glory | Johnny Murtagh | Aidan O'Brien | Smith / Magnier / Tabor | 2:30.87 |
| 2010 | Cape Blanco | Johnny Murtagh | Aidan O'Brien | Smith / Magnier / Tabor | 2:28.68 |
| 2011 | Treasure Beach | Colm O'Donoghue | Aidan O'Brien | Smith / Magnier / Tabor | 2:33.26 |
| 2012 | Camelot | Joseph O'Brien | Aidan O'Brien | Derrick Smith | 2:43.96 |
| 2013 | Trading Leather | Kevin Manning | Jim Bolger | Mrs J S Bolger | 2:27.17 |
| 2014 | Australia | Joseph O'Brien | Aidan O'Brien | Smith / Magnier / Tabor | 2:33.19 |
| 2015 | Jack Hobbs | William Buick | John Gosden | Godolphin & Partners | 2:34:93 |
| 2016 | Harzand | Pat Smullen | Dermot Weld | Aga Khan IV | 2:38:05 |
| 2017 | Capri | Seamie Heffernan | Aidan O'Brien | Smith / Magnier / Tabor | 2:35.45 |
| 2018 | Latrobe | Donnacha O'Brien | Joseph O'Brien | Lloyd Williams | 2:32.62 |
| 2019 | Sovereign | Padraig Beggy | Aidan O'Brien | Magnier / Tabor / Smith | 2:31.50 |
| 2020 | Santiago | Seamie Heffernan | Aidan O'Brien | Tabor / Smith / Magnier | 2:38.17 |
| 2021 | Hurricane Lane | William Buick | Charlie Appleby | Godolphin | 2:33.85 |
| 2022 | Westover | Colin Keane | Ralph Beckett | Juddmonte | 2:34.80 |
| 2023 | Auguste Rodin | Ryan Moore | Aidan O'Brien | Tabor / Smith / Magnier / Westerberg | 2:33.24 |
| 2024 | Los Angeles | Ryan Moore | Aidan O'Brien | Westerberg/Tabor / Smith / Magnier | 2:28.15 |
| 2025 | Lambourn | Ryan Moore | Aidan O'Brien | Magnier /Tabor / Smith | 2:29.18 |
| 2026 | Benvenuto Cellini | Ryan Moore | Aidan O'Brien | Brant / Magnier /Tabor / Smith / Westerberg | 2:28.33 |

^{a} Premonition finished first in 1953 but was disqualified.

== Earlier winners ==
- 1866: Selim
- 1867: Golden Plover
- 1868: Madeira
- 1869: The Scout
- 1870: Billy Pitt
- 1871: Maid of Athens
- 1872: Trickstress
- 1873: Kyrle Daly
- 1874: Ben Battle
- 1875: Innishowen
- 1876: Umpire
- 1877: Redskin
- 1878: Madame du Barry
- 1879: Soulouque
- 1880: King of the Bees
- 1881: Master Ned
- 1882: Sortie
- 1883: Sylph
- 1884: Theologian
- 1885: St Kevin
- 1886: Theodemir
- 1887: Pet Fox
- 1888: Theodolite
- 1889: Tragedy
- 1890: Kentish Fire
- 1891: Narraghmore
- 1892: Roy Neil
- 1893: Bowline
- 1894: Blairfinde
- 1895: Portmarnock
- 1896: Gulsalberk
- 1897: Wales
- 1898: Noble Howard
- 1899: Oppressor
- 1900: Gallinaria
- 1901: Carrigavalla
- 1902: St Brendan
- 1903: Lord Rossmore
- 1904: Royal Arch
- 1905: Flax Park
- 1906: Killeagh
- 1907: Orby
- 1908: Wild Bouquet
- 1909: Bachelor's Double
- 1910: Aviator
- 1911: Shanballymore
- 1912: Civility
- 1913: Bachelor's Wedding
- 1914: Land of Song
- 1915: Ballaghtobin
- 1916: Furore
- 1917: First Flier
- 1918: King John
- 1919: Loch Lomond
- 1920: He Goes
- 1921: Ballyheron
- 1922: Spike Island
- 1923: Waygood
- 1924: Haine / Zodiac ^{1}
- 1925: Zionist
- 1926: Embargo
- 1927: Knight of the Grail
- 1928: Baytown
- 1929: Kopi
- 1930: Rock Star
- 1931: Sea Serpent
- 1932: Dastur
- 1933: Harinero
- 1934: Patriot King / Primero (Note: The 1924 and 1934 races were dead-heats and have joint winners.)
- 1935: Museum
- 1936: Raeburn
- 1937: Phideas
- 1938: Rosewell
- 1939: Mondragon
- 1940: Turkhan
- 1941: Sol Oriens
- 1942: Windsor Slipper
- 1943: The Phoenix
- 1944: Slide On
- 1945: Piccadilly

== See also ==
- Horse racing in Ireland
- Irish Triple Crown race winners
- List of Irish flat horse races
