= Dee Stakes =

Flat horse race in Britain

- Class: Listed
- Location: Chester Racecourse; Chester, England
- Inaugurated: 1813
- Race type: Flat / Thoroughbred
- Sponsor: Boodles
- Website: Chester

Race information
- Distance: 1m 2f 70y (2,076m)
- Surface: Turf
- Track: Left-handed
- Qualification: Three-year-old colts and geldings
- Weight: 9 st 2 lb Penalties; 5 lb for Group race winners* 3 lb for Listed race winners * * since 31 August 2024
- Purse: £100,000 (2025); 1st: £56,710

Dee Stakes
2026
Constitution River	Generic	Golden Story

Previous years
2025
Mount Kilimanjaro	High Stock	Great David
2024
Capulet	Bracken's Laugh	Jayarebe
2023
San Antonio	Alder	Local Dynasty
2022
Star Of India	Cresta	Sonny Liston
2021
El Drama	Maximal	Earlswood

2020-2010
2019
Circus Maximus	Mohawk	Fox Chairman
2018
Rostropovich	My Lord And Master	King's Proctor
2017
Cliffs Of Moher	Bay Of Poets	Max Zorin
2016
Viren's Army	Linguistic	Housesofparliament
2015
Not So Sleepy	Disegno	Prince Gagarin
2014
Kingfisher	Bow Creek	Somewhat
2013
Magician	Contributer	Glacial Age
2012
Astrology	Oxford Charley	Kingsdesire
2011
Glen's Diamond	Maqaraat	Tinkertown

2010-2001
2010
Azmeel	Dancing David	Rasmy
2009
South Easter	Gitano Hernando	Drumbeat
2008
Tajaaweed	Unnefer	Achill Island
2007
Admiralofthefleet	Desert Dew	Habalwatan
2006
Art Deco	Ivy Creek	Alhaajes
2005
Gypsy King	Im Spartacus	Zalongo
2004
African Dream	Putra Sas	Mutawassel
2003
Kris Kin	Big Bad Bob	Private Charter
2002
Sohab	Sir George Turner	Playapart
2001
Dr Greenfield	Grandera	Tortello I

2000-1991
2000
Trillion Delight	Three Points	Zyz
1999
Oath	Little Rock	Bombard
1998
Prolix	Scorned	Trident
1997
Crystal Hearted	Barnum Sands	Teofilio
1996
Prize Giving	Oriental Express	Weet-A-Minute
1995
Pentire	Sanoosea	Murajja
1994
Cicerao	Waiting	Rainbow Heights
1993
Beneficial	Blues Traveller	Newton's Law
1992
My Memoirs	Profusion	Torrey Canyon
1991
Hundra	Half A Tick	Arokat

1990-1988
1990
Blue Stag	Saumarez	Bridal Toast
1989
Free Sweater	Marine Diver	Road To Reason
1988
Clifton Chapel	Nickle Plated	Red Pencil

The Dee Stakes is a Listed flat horse race in Great Britain open to three-year-old colts and geldings. It is run over a distance of 1 mile, 2 furlongs and 70 yards (2,076 metres) at Chester in May.

== History ==
The event is named after the River Dee, which runs alongside the racecourse. It was established in 1813, and was originally open to both colts and fillies.

In the late 19th century, the distance of the Dee Stakes was about 1½ miles. The race was won by Voluptuary, a subsequent Grand National winner, in 1881.

From 1937, the official distance was 1 mile, 4 furlongs and 53 yards. It was cut to 1 mile, 2 furlongs and 10 yards in 1958, and extended by 14 yards in 1970.

The present system of race grading was introduced in 1971, and the Dee Stakes was given Group 3 status. It was increased to 1 mile, 2 furlongs and 85 yards in 1973.

The race was downgraded to Listed level in 1988. Its distance was cut by 10 yards in 1992. It regained Group 3 status in 2003 and was again downgraded to Listed status in 2014.

The Dee Stakes can serve as a trial for the Epsom Derby. The last horse to win both races was Kris Kin in 2003. The 2026 winner, Constitution River, won the Prix du Jockey Club, France's equivalent of the Derby.

== Records ==
Leading jockey since 1900 (9 wins):

- Ryan Moore - Magician (2013), Cliffs of Moher (2017), Rostropovich (2018), Circus Maximus (2019), Star of India (2022), San Antonio (2023), Capulet (2024), Mount Kilimanjaro (2025), Constitution River (2026)

Leading trainer since 1900 (13 wins):

- Aidan O'Brien - Gypsy King (2005), Admiralofthefleet (2007), Astrology (2012), Magician (2013), Kingfisher (2014), Cliffs of Moher (2017), Rostropovich (2018), Circus Maximus (2019), Star of India (2022), San Antonio (2023), Capulet (2024), Mount Kilimanjaro (2025), Constitution River (2026)

== Winners since 1900 ==
Year	Winner	Jockey	Trainer	Time
1900	Lumley Moor	Fred Finlay	Matthews	2:50.60
1901	Sir Edgar	Mornington Cannon	John Porter	2:49.80
1902	Throwaway	Mornington Cannon	John Porter	2:45.40
1903	Gilbert Orme
1904	Islesman	Harry Aylin	Harry Enoch
1905	Chuckaway	Barry Lynham	Sandy Braime
1906	Troutbeck	Herbert Jones	William Waugh
1907	Wool Winder	Otto Madden	Harry Enoch
1908	Abbot's Abode	William Halsey	Sandy Braime
1909	Great Peter	Bernard Dillon	Fred Day
1910	Glazebrook	William Griggs	Andy Fergusson
1911	St Girons	Frank Wootton	George Lambton
1912	Maritza	Billy Higgs	Ralph Moreton
1913	The Curragh	Jim Clark	Alec Taylor Jr.
1914	Conqueror	Jim Clark	William Sanderson
1915	Achtoi	Charlie Trigg	Henry Davies
	no race 1916–18
1919	Silonyx	Steve Donoghue	William Waugh
1920	Paladin	Bernard Carslake	Atty Persse
1921	Meeting Abandoned due to a National Coal Strike
1922	Fred Power	Vic Smyth	Fred Darling	2:43.00
1923	Roger de Busli	Henri Jelliss	Basil Jarvis	2:46.80
1924	Battleship	William McLachlan Sr.	Etienne De Mestre	2:48.40
1925	Runnymede	Joe Childs	William Jarvis	2:50.80
1926	Abandoned due to Nationwide Industrial Action (Note: 1926 United Kingdom general strike)
1927	Royal Pom	Joseph Dines	Reg Day	2:44.00
1928	Ranjit Singh	Michael Beary	Richard Dawson
1929	Free Forester	Tommy Weston	Major Fred Sneyd	2:48.40
1930	Master Mint	Richard Perryman	Reg Day
1931	Mangosteen	Richard Perryman	John Watson	2:43.40
1932	Yellowstone	Tommy Weston	George Lambton
1933	Highlander	Tommy Weston	George Lambton	2:47.80
1934	Alishah	Gordon Richards	Frank Butters	2:47.60
1935	Pry II	Charlie Smirke	George Digby	2:40.40
1936	Noble King	Richard Perryman	Frank Butters	2:41.60
1937	Sunbather	Steve Donoghue	Joseph Lawson	2:49.40
1938	Pactolus	Billy Nevett	Matthew Peacock	2:41.60
1939	Triguero	Tommy Burns Sr.	Richard Dawson	2:42.00
	no race 1940–45
1946	Neapolitan	Harry Wragg	Walter Earl	2:33.40
1947	Maray	Ken Gethin	Tom Rimell	2:47.20
1948	King's Acre	Harry Carr	Walter Easterby	2:42.20
1949	Father Thames	Bill Rickaby	Jack Jarvis	2:42.20
1950	Khorassan	Doug Smith	Marcus Marsh	2:47.40
1951	Sybil's Nephew	Bill Rickaby	Jack Jarvis	2:46.80
1952	Torcross	Billy Nevett	Richard Peacock	2:58.00
1953	Victory Roll	Bill Rickaby	Atty Persse	2:40.60
1954	Cloonroughan	Ken Gethin	Willie Stephenson	2:40.20
1955	Tippecanoe	Edgar Britt	Charles Elsey	2:46.40
1956	Atlas	Harry Carr	Cecil Boyd-Rochfort	2:38.60
1957	Palor	Eph Smith	Reg Day	2:40.60
1958	Pandour	Stan Clayton	Dick Hern	2:10.40
1959	Parthia	Harry Carr	Cecil Boyd-Rochfort	2:15.60
1960	Alcaeus	Ron Hutchinson	Paddy Prendergast	2:09.00
1961	Oakville	Eddie Hide	Bill Elsey	2:23.80
1962	Persian Wonder	Joe Mercer	Jack Colling	2:19.20
1963	My Myosotis	Brian Taylor	Harvey Leader	2:14.80
1964	Sweet Moss	Lester Piggott	Noel Murless	2:12.80
1965	Look Sharp	Doug Smith	Bernard van Cutsem	2:23.60
1966	Grey Moss	Paul Cook	Vincent O'Brien	2:19.00
1967	French Vine	Eddie Hide	Bill Elsey	2:11.60
1968	Laureate	Willie Carson	Bernard van Cutsem	2:17.60
1969	Abandoned due to waterlogging
1970	Golden Monad	Willie Carson	Barry Hills	2:09.00
1971	Colum	Joe Mercer	Dick Hern	2:11.40
1972	Our Mirage	Ernie Johnson	Barry Hills	2:17.60
1973	Natsun	Willie Carson	Barry Hills	2:21.34
1974	Averof	Lester Piggott	Clive Brittain	2:19.07
1975	Ravel	Willie Carson	Barry Hills	2:21.43
1976	Great Idea	Alan Bond	Henry Cecil	2:22.88
1977	Royal Plume	Joe Mercer	Henry Cecil	2:22.51
1978	Heir Presumptive	Lester Piggott	Fulke Johnson Houghton	2:13.58
1979	Two of Diamonds	Steve Cauthen	Barry Hills	2:36.20
1980	Playboy Jubilee	Philip Robinson	Frankie Durr	2:09.90
1981	Kirtling	Lester Piggott	Harry Wragg	2:16.53
1982	Ivano	Lester Piggott	Henry Cecil	2:10.54
1983	Abandoned due to waterlogging
1984	Trial by Error	Darrel McHargue	Luca Cumani	2:16.20
1985	Infantry	Brent Thomson	Barry Hills	2:13.26
1986	Faraway Dancer	Steve Cauthen	Henry Cecil	2:26.50
1987	Sir Harry Lewis	Cash Asmussen	Barry Hills	2:08.60
1988	Clifton Chapel	John Lowe	Steve Norton	2:31.93
1989	Free Sweater	Michael Hills	Barry Hills	2:09.14
1990	Blue Stag	Willie Carson	Barry Hills	2:13.29
1991	Hundra	Bruce Raymond	Paul Kelleway	2:14.59
1992	My Memoirs	John Reid	Richard Hannon Sr.	2:09.29
1993	Beneficial	Michael Hills	Geoff Wragg	2:07.98
1994	Cicerao	Walter Swinburn	Henry Cecil	2:10.92
1995	Pentire	Michael Hills	Geoff Wragg	2:11.78
1996	Prize Giving	Michael Hills	Geoff Wragg	2:12.11
1997	Crystal Hearted	Tony McGlone	Henry Candy	2:35.14
1998	Prolix	Darryll Holland	Barry Hills	2:10.37
1999	Oath	Kieren Fallon	Henry Cecil	2:10.51
2000	Merry Merlin (Note: The 2000 winner Merry Merlin was later exported to Hong Kong and renamed Trillion Delight)	Richard Quinn	Michael Bell	2:10.00
2001	Dr Greenfield	Kieren Fallon	Gerard Butler	2:09.09
2002	Sohaib	Richard Hills	Barry Hills	2:08.30
2003	Kris Kin	Fergal Lynch	Sir Michael Stoute	2:10.11
2004	African Dream	Jimmy Quinn	Peter Chapple-Hyam	2:19.74
2005	Gypsy King	Kieren Fallon	Aidan O'Brien	2:16.47
2006	Art Deco	Frankie Dettori	Charles Egerton	2:16.15
2007	Admiralofthefleet	Michael Kinane	Aidan O'Brien	2:09.82
2008	Tajaaweed	Richard Hills	Sir Michael Stoute	2:11.03
2009	South Easter	Neil Callan	William Haggas	2:10.21
2010	Azmeel	Frankie Dettori	John Gosden	2:14.75
2011	Glen's Diamond	Paul Hanagan	Richard Fahey	2:11.24
2012	Astrology	Joseph O'Brien	Aidan O'Brien	2:21.57
2013	Magician	Ryan Moore	Aidan O'Brien	2:12.96
2014	Kingfisher	Joseph O'Brien	Aidan O'Brien	2:20.49
2015	Not So Sleepy	Jim Crowley	Hughie Morrison	2:21.04
2016	Viren's Army	Silvestre de Sousa	Richard Hannon Jr.	2:11.48
2017	Cliffs of Moher	Ryan Moore	Aidan O'Brien	2:10.85
2018	Rostropovich	Ryan Moore	Aidan O'Brien	2:12.33
2019	Circus Maximus	Ryan Moore	Aidan O'Brien	2:16.51
	no race 2020 (Note: The 2020 running was cancelled because of the COVID-19 pandemic in the United Kingdom)
2021	El Drama	Andrea Atzeni	Roger Varian	2:14.15
2022	Star of India	Ryan Moore	Aidan O'Brien	2:12.25
2023	San Antonio	Ryan Moore	Aidan O'Brien	2:19.90
2024	Capulet (Note: The 2024 winner Capulet was later exported to Hong Kong and renamed Romantic Thor)	Ryan Moore	Aidan O'Brien	2:10.67
2025	Mount Kilimanjaro	Ryan Moore	Aidan O'Brien	2:12.89
2026	Constitution River	Ryan Moore	Aidan O'Brien	2:06.54

== Earlier winners ==
- 1813: Bravo
- 1814: Prince of Orange
- 1815: Rosabella
- 1816: Bustard
- 1817: Wirral
- 1818: sister to William
- 1819: Comet
- 1820: Claudius
- 1821: Stingo
- 1822: colt by Orville
- 1823: General Mina
- 1824: Portrait
- 1825: Autocrat
- 1826: Leviathan
- 1827: Joceline
- 1828: Terror
- 1829: Butterfly
- 1830: Moss Rose
- 1831: Tilcher
- 1832: Birdcatcher
- 1833: Jack Faucet
- 1834: Touchstone
- 1835: Peter Simple
- 1836: Trap-Ball
- 1837: Pammon
- 1838: Sir Ralph
- 1839: Apothecary
- 1840: The Shah
- 1841: Satirist
- 1842: Combermere
- 1843: General Pollock
- 1844: The Cure
- 1845:
- 1846: Fancy Boy
- 1847: The Swallow
- 1848: Flatcatcher
- 1849: Elthiron
- 1850: The Bee-Hunter
- 1851: Hippolytus
- 1852: Attack
- 1853: Orinoco
- 1854: Scythian
- 1855: Noisy
- 1856: Bird in Hand
- 1857: Strathnaver
- 1858: East Langton
- 1859: Actaeon
- 1860: Northern Light
- 1861: Starlight
- 1862: Costa
- 1863: Borealis
- 1864: Greville
- 1865: Broomielaw
- 1866: Bertie
- 1867: Van Amburgh
- 1868: Uncas
- 1869: Whinyard
- 1870: Bonny Swell
- 1871: The Knight
- 1872: Malahide
- 1873: Master John
- 1874: De Cambis
- 1875: Perkin Warbeck
- 1876: Advance
- 1877: Bonnie Robin
- 1878: Red Archer
- 1879: Sunburn
- 1880: Toastmaster
- 1881: Voluptuary
- 1882: Whipper-In
- 1883: John Jones
- 1884: Newton
- 1885: Metal
- 1886: Coracle
- 1887: Savile (Note: The 1887 race finished as a dead-heat between Savile and The Rector, but it was decided by a run-off)
- 1888: Toscano
- 1889: Davenport
- 1890: Sainfoin
- 1891: Sarawak
- 1892: Haymaker
- 1893: Ali
- 1894: Alfragan
- 1895: Oleander
- 1896: Nouveau Riche
- 1897: Prime Minister / Silver Fox (Note: The 1897 race was a dead-heat and has joint winners)
- 1898: Schonberg
- 1899: Trident

== See also ==
- Horse racing in Great Britain
- List of British flat horse races
