= King George VI and Queen Elizabeth Stakes top three finishers =

This is a listing of first, second, and third-place finishers, winning time and the number of starters in the King George VI and Queen Elizabeth Stakes, a Group 1 British thoroughbred race run at 1-1/2 miles on turf for horses three years old and older. It is the most prestigious all-aged race run in the United Kingdom.

Year	Winner (trained)	Second (trained)	Third (trained)	Time	Starters
1951	Supreme Court (GB)	Zucchero (GB)	Tantieme (FR)	2:29.4	19
1952	Tulyar (GB)	Gay Time (GB)	Worden (FR)	2:33.0	15
1953	Pinza (GB)	Aureole (GB)	Worden (FR)	2:34.0	13
1954	Aureole (GB)	Vamos (FR)	Darius (GB)	2:44.0	17
1955	Vimy (FR)	Acropolis (GB)	Elopement (GB)	2:33.76	10
1956	Ribot (ITY)	High Veldt (GB)	Todrai (Belgium)	2:40.24	9
1957	Montaval (FR)	Al Mabsoot (FR)	Tribord (FR)	2:41.02	12
1958	Ballymoss (IRE)	Almeria (GB)	Doutelle (GB)	2:36.33	8
1959	Alcide (GB)	Gladness (IRE)	Balbo (FR)	2:31.39	11
1960	Aggressor (GB)	Petite Etoile (GB)	Kythnos (IRE)	2:35.21	8
1961	Right Royal (FR)	St. Paddy (GB)	Rockavon (GB)	2:40.34	4
1962	Match (FR)	Aurelius (GB)	Arctic Storm (IRE)	2:37.02	11
1963	Ragusa (IRE)	Miralgo (GB)	Tarqogan (IRE)	2:33.80	10
1964	Nasram (FR)	Santa Claus (IRE)	Royal Avenue (GB)	2:33.15	4
1965	Meadow Court (IRE)	Soderini (GB)	Oncidium (GB)	2:33.27	12
1966	Aunt Edith (GB)	Sodium (GB)	Prominer (IRE)	2:35.06	5
1967	Busted (GB)	Salvo (GB)	Ribocco (GB)	2:33.64	9
1968	Royal Palace (GB)	Felicio (FR)	Topyo (FR)	2:33.22	7
1969	Park Top (GB)	Crozier (GB)	Hogarth (ITY)	2:32.46	9
1970	Nijinsky (IRE)	Blakeney (GB)	Crepellana (FR)	2:36.16	6
1971	Mill Reef (GB)	Ortis (GB)	Acclimatisation (FR)	2:32.56	10
1972	Brigadier Gerard (GB)	Parnell (GB)	Riverman (FR)	2:32.91	9
1973	Dahlia (FR)	Rheingold (GB)	Our Mirage (GB)	2:30.43	12
1974	Dahlia (FR)	Highclere (GB)	Dankaro (FR)	2:33.03	10
1975	Grundy (GB)	Bustino (GB)	Dahlia (FR)	2:26.98	11
1976	Pawneese (FR)	Bruni (GB)	Orange Bay (GB)	2:29.46	10
1977	The Minstrel (IRE)	Orange Bay (GB)	Exceller (FR)	2:30.48	11
1978	Ile de Bourbon (GB)	Hawaiian Sound (GB)	Montcontour (FR)	2:30.53	14
1979	Troy (GB)	Gay Mecene (FR)	Ela-Mana-Mou (GB)	2:33.75	7
1980	Ela-Mana-Mou (GB)	Mrs Penny (GB)	Gregorian (IRE)	2:35.39	10
1981	Shergar (GB)	Madam Gay (GB)	Fingal's Cave (GB)	2:35.40	7
1982	Kalaglow (GB)	Assert (IRE)	Glint of Gold (GB)	2:31.88	9
1983	Time Charter (GB)	Diamond Shoal (GB)	Sun Princess (GB)	2:30.79	9
1984	Teenoso (GB)	Sadler's Wells (IRE)	Tolomeo (GB)	2:27.95	13
1985	Petoski (GB)	Oh So Sharp (GB)	Rainbow Quest (GB)	2:29.49	12
1986	Dancing Brave (GB)	Shardari (GB)	Triptych (FR)	2:29.49	9
1987	Reference Point (GB)	Celestial Storm (GB)	Triptych (FR)	2:34.63	9
1988	Mtoto (GB)	Unfuwain (GB)	Tony Bin (ITY)	2:37.33	10
1989	Nashwan (GB)	Cacoethes (GB)	Top Class (GB)	2:32.27	7
1990	Belmez (GB)	Old Vic (GB)	Assatis (GB)	2:30.76	11
1991	Generous (GB)	Sanglamore (GB)	Rock Hopper (GB)	2:28.99	9
1992	St Jovite (IRE)	Saddlers' Hall (GB)	Opera House (GB)	2:30.85	8
1993	Opera House (GB)	White Muzzle (GB)	Commander in Chief (GB)	2:33.94	10
1994	Kings Theatre (GB)	White Muzzle (GB)	Wagon Master (GB)	2:28.92	12
1995	Lammtarra (GB)	Pentire (GB)	Strategic Choice (GB)	2:31.01	7
1996	Pentire (GB)	Classic Cliche (GB/UAE)	Shaamit (GB)	2:28.11	8
1997	Swain (GB/UAE)	Pilsudski (GB)	Helissio (FR)	2:36.45	8
1998	Swain (GB/UAE)	High-Rise (GB)	Royal Anthem (GB)	2:29.06	15
1999	Daylami (GB/UAE)	Nedawi (GB/UAE)	Fruits of Love (GB)	2:29.35	8
2000	Montjeu (FR)	Fantastic Light (GB/UAE)	Daliapour (GB)	2:29.98	7
2001	Galileo (IRE)	Fantastic Light (GB/UAE)	Hightori (FR)	2:27.71	12
2002	Golan (GB)	Nayef (GB)	Zindabad (GB)	2:29.70	9
2003	Alamshar (IRE)	Sulamani (GB/UAE)	Kris Kin (GB)	2:33.26	12
2004	Doyen (GB/UAE)	Hard Buck (USA)	Sulamani (GB/UAE)	2:33.18	11
2005	Azamour (IRE)	Norse Dancer (GB)	Bago (FR)	2:28.26	12
2006	Hurricane Run (FR)	Electrocutionist (GB/UAE)	Heart's Cry (JPN)	2:30.29	6
2007	Dylan Thomas (IRE)	Youmzain (GB)	Maraahel (GB)	2:31.11	7
2008	Duke of Marmalade (IRE)	Papal Bull (GB)	Youmzain (GB)	2:27.91	8
2009	Conduit (GB)	Tartan Bearer (GB)	Ask (GB)	2:28.73	9
2010	Harbinger (GB)	Cape Blanco (IRE)	Youmzain (GB)	2:26.78	6
2011	Nathaniel (GB)	Workforce (GB)	St Nicholas Abbey (IRE)	2:35.07	5
2012	Danedream (GER)	Nathaniel (GB)	St Nicholas Abbey (IRE)	2:31.62	10
2013	Novellist (GER)	Trading Leather (IRE)	Hillstar (GB)	2:24.60	8
2014	Taghrooda (GB)	Telescope (GB)	Mukhadram (GB)	2:28.13	8
2015	Postponed (GB)	Eagle Top (GB)	Romsdal (GB)	2:31.25	7
2016	Highland Reel (IRE)	Wings of Desire (GB)	Dartmouth (GB)	2:28.97	7
2017	Enable (GB)	Ulysses (GB)	Idaho (IRE)	2:36.22	10
2018	Poet's Word (GB)	Crystal Ocean (GB)	Coronet (GB)	2:25.84	8
2019	Enable (GB)	Crystal Ocean (GB)	Waldgeist (FR)	2:32.42	11
2020	Enable (GB)	Sovereign (IRE)	Japan (IRE)	2:28.92	3
2021	Adayar (GB)	Mishriff (GB)	Love (IRE)	2:26.54	5
2022	Pyledriver (GB)	Torquator Tasso (GER)	Mishriff (GB)	2:29.49	6
2023	Hukum (GB)	Westover (GB)	King of Steel (GB)	2:33.95	10
2024	Goliath (FR)	Bluestocking (GB)	Rebel's Romance (GB)	2:27.43	9
2025	Calandagan (FR)	Kalpana (GB)	Rebel's Romance (GB)	2:29.74	5
2026	Kalpana (GB)	Calandagan (FR)	Benvenuto Cellini (IRE)	2:27.72	9
