= Ace of Aces (horse) =

American-bred Thoroughbred racehorse

- Sire: Vaguely Noble
- Grandsire: Vienna
- Dam: Sofarsogood
- Damsire: Revoked
- Sex: Stallion
- Foaled: 1970
- Country: United States
- Colour: Bay
- Breeder: John R. Gaines
- Owner: Nelson Bunker Hunt
- Trainer: Maurice Zilber
- Record: 21: 6-5-2

Major wins
- Prix du Chemin de Fer du Nord (1974); Sussex Stakes (1974); Oettingen-Rennen (1974)

Awards
- Timeform rating 126 (1974)

Ace of Aces (1970 – 26 March 1992) was an American-bred French-trained Thoroughbred racehorse and sire. He showed modest ability as a three-year-old in 1973, winning one minor event from seven races. He began the following year as a pacemaker for his more highly regarded stable companions but soon developed into a high-class sprinter-miler, recording his first major win in the Prix du Chemin de Fer du Nord. He was then sent to England and scored the biggest win of his career when winning the Sussex Stakes. He went on to win the Oettingen-Rennen in Germany and was narrowly beaten in the Prix de l'Abbaye before being retired from racing at the end of the year. He stood as a breeding stallion in the United States and New Zealand but was not a success as a sire of winners.

== Background ==
Ace of Aces was a "strong, heavy-shouldered" bay horse with a white star and three white socks bred in Kentucky by John R Gaines of Gainesway Farm. His sire, Vaguely Noble, won the Prix de l'Arc de Triomphe in 1968 before becoming a successful breeding stallion whose best progeny included Dahlia, Exceller and Empery. Ace of Aces's dam Sofarsogood was a high-class racemare who won the Fashion Stakes in 1954. She was a granddaughter of the influential broodmare Summit whose other descendants included Nijinsky, The Minstrel and Lahan.

The colt entered the ownership of the Texas oil company executive Nelson Bunker Hunt and was sent to race in France where he was trained by Maurice Zilber.

== Racing career ==
=== 1973: three-year-old season ===
Ace of Aces was unraced as a two-year-old before beginning his racing career in 1973. He showed some signs of ability, winning one minor race and only once finishing out of the first four in seven starts. He was tried in blinkers on more than one occasion.

=== 1974: four-year-old season ===
Ace of Aces finished second in his first two races as a four-year-old and then acted as a pacemaker for his more illustrious stablemate Dahlia in the Prix Ganay at Longchamp Racecourse on 5 May. After winning two minor races, the horse contested the Prix du Chemin de Fer du Nord at Chantilly Racecourse on 12 June and started the 4.6/1 second favourite in a thirteen-runner field. Ridden by Bill Pyers he won decisively by two and a half lengths from Gay Style. On his next appearance, Ace of Aces finished second to El Rastro in the Prix de la Porte Maillot, with the British gelding Boldboy in fourth. In early July he was sent to race in England and finished unplaced behind Coup de Feu in the Eclipse Stakes over ten furlongs, tiring badly after taking the lead on the final turn.

In late July, Ace of Aces was sent to England again to contest the Group One Sussex Stakes over one mile at Goodwood Racecourse. Ridden by the British jockey Jimmy Lindley he started at odds of 8/1 against nine opponents including Averof (St James's Palace Stakes), Habat (Middle Park Stakes), Pitcairn (runner-up in the Irish 2,000 Guineas) and Mount Hagen (third in the Eclipse Stakes). Lindley held the colt up towards the rear of the field as Averof set the pace from Mount Hagen and Habat. Mount Hagen went to the front in the straight but Ace of Aces made rapid progress to take the lead approaching the final furlong and drew away to win by two lengths from Habat. Ace of Aces returned to France two weeks after his Goodwood triumph but ran poorly to finish ninth of the ten runners behind Nonoalco in the Prix Jacques Le Marois. He was then sent to Germany for the Oettingen-Rennen over 1600 metres at Baden-Baden later in August. He was partnered by Lester Piggott and won by a neck from the British-trained Flintham, to whom he was conceding eight pounds.

In Autumn, Ace of Aces ran twice against top class opposition at Longchamp Racecourse. On 29 September, ridden by the Irish jockey Pat Eddery, he finished fourth behind Mount Hagen, Northern Taste and Lianga in the Prix du Moulin over 1600 metres. A week later he was brought back in distance and matched against specialist sprinters in the Prix de l'Abbaye over 1000 metres. He was held up by Piggott before finishing strongly but failed by a neck to overhaul the three-year-old Moubariz.

Ace of Aces achievements in 1974 had an indirect, but long-term impact on Thoroughbred racing. It was whilst discussing the Kentucky-bred's emphatic victory in the Sussex Stakes that John Magnier and Robert Sangster decided to target the major American yearling sales with a view to developing future breeding stallions. Over the subsequent decades, this strategy led to the global success of the Coolmore Stud.

== Assessment ==
In 1974, the independent Timeform organisation gave Ace of Aces a rating of 126, making him ten pounds inferior to their Horse of the Year Allez France. He was rated eighteen pounds behind Allez France in the official French ratings and thirteen pounds behind the top-rated Dahlia in the British Free Handicap for older horses.

== Stud record ==
Ace of Aces was retired from racing to become a breeding stallion. He stood in the United States until 1981 and was later based in New Zealand. The most successful of his offspring was probably the Canadian horse Jacksboro, whose wins included two editions of the Vigil Stakes, the Durham Cup Stakes and the King Edward Stakes. His last foals were born in 1992, and he died on 26 March 1992 in New Zealand.

== Pedigree ==
Pedigree of Ace of Aces (USA), bay stallion, 1970
Sire Vaguely Noble (IRE) 1965	Vienna (GB); 1957	Aureole	Hyperion*
Sire Vaguely Noble (IRE) 1965	Vienna (GB); 1957	Aureole	Angelola
Sire Vaguely Noble (IRE) 1965	Vienna (GB); 1957	Turkish Blood	Turkhan
Sire Vaguely Noble (IRE) 1965	Vienna (GB); 1957	Turkish Blood	Rusk
Sire Vaguely Noble (IRE) 1965	Noble Lassie (GB); 1956	Nearco	Pharos*
Sire Vaguely Noble (IRE) 1965	Noble Lassie (GB); 1956	Nearco	Nogara
Sire Vaguely Noble (IRE) 1965	Noble Lassie (GB); 1956	Belle Sauvage	Big Game
Sire Vaguely Noble (IRE) 1965	Noble Lassie (GB); 1956	Belle Sauvage	Tropical Sun*
Dam Sofarsogood (USA) 1952	Revoked (USA); 1943	Blue Larkspur	Black Servant
Dam Sofarsogood (USA) 1952	Revoked (USA); 1943	Blue Larkspur	Blossom Time
Dam Sofarsogood (USA) 1952	Revoked (USA); 1943	Gala Belle	Sir Gallahad
Dam Sofarsogood (USA) 1952	Revoked (USA); 1943	Gala Belle	Bel Tempo
Dam Sofarsogood (USA) 1952	Apogee (USA); 1934	Pharamond	Phalaris*
Dam Sofarsogood (USA) 1952	Apogee (USA); 1934	Pharamond	Selene*
Dam Sofarsogood (USA) 1952	Apogee (USA); 1934	Summit	Ultimus
Dam Sofarsogood (USA) 1952	Apogee (USA); 1934	Summit	Torpenhow (Family: 8-f)

* Ace of Aces is inbred 4S x 5S to the stallion Hyperion, meaning that he appears fourth generation and fifth generation (via Tropical Sun) on the sire side of his pedigree.

* Ace of Aces is inbred 5S x 4D to the stallion Phalaris, meaning that he appears fifth generation (via Pharos) on the sire side of his pedigree, and fourth generation on the dam side of his pedigree.

* Ace of Aces is inbred 5S x 4D to the dam Selene, meaning that she appears fifth generation (via Hyperion) on the sire side of his pedigree, and fourth generation on the dam side of his pedigree.
