= Inkerman (horse) =

American-bred Thoroughbred racehorse

- Sire: Vaguely Noble
- Grandsire: Vienna
- Dam: Crimea
- Damsire: Princequillo
- Sex: Stallion
- Foaled: 4 April 1975
- Country: United States
- Colour: Bay
- Breeder: Mrs. John W. Hanes
- Owner: Simon Fraser; Edward Hudson
- Trainer: Vincent O'Brien; Charlie Whittingham
- Record: 17: 5-3-3

Major wins
- Gallinule Stakes (1978); Joe McGrath Memorial Stakes (1978); Sunset Handicap (1980)

Awards
- Timeform rating 126 (1978)

Inkerman (4 April 1975 – after 1987) was an American-bred Thoroughbred racehorse and sire. Trained in Ireland as a three-year-old, he won his first two races including the Gallinule Stakes and then finished unplaced when favourite for The Derby. Later that year he recorded his biggest win in Europe when he won the Group 1 Joe McGrath Memorial Stakes. After being sold for a world record sum he was transferred to the United States where he won the Sunset Handicap in 1980. He later stood as a breeding stallion but had very little success as a sire of winners.

== Background ==
Inkerman was a "workmanlike, short-backed" bay horse with no white markings bred in Kentucky by Mrs. John W. Hanes. As a yearling he was consigned to the Keeneland Select sale and was bought for $47,000 by the bloodstock agency Horse France. He entered the ownership of Simon Fraser and was sent to Europe where he was sent into training with Vincent O'Brien at Ballydoyle.

He was sired by Vaguely Noble who won the Prix de l'Arc de Triomphe in 1968 before becoming a successful breeding stallion whose best progeny included Dahlia, Exceller and Empery. Inkerman's dam Crimea was a fast and precocious filly who won the Cheveley Park Stakes in 1963 and was a distant female-line descendant of the influential British broodmare Molly Adare.

== Racing career ==
=== 1978: three-year-old season ===
Inkerman began his racing career in a maiden race over ten furlongs at the Curragh on 13 May and won by four lengths from his stablemate Noble Quillo. Two weeks later he was stepped up in class for the Gallinule Stakes over one and a half miles and won again, coming home six lengths clear of Encyclopedia. The colt quickly became regarded as a major contender for The Derby ten days later especially after Lester Piggott opted to ride the colt. Piggott was looking to follow up his victories on Empery 1976 and The Minstrel in 1977 and win the race for a record ninth time. Despite his lack of experience Inkerman started favourite but after racing close to the lead in the early stages he dropped away quickly in the straight and finished twenty-first of the twenty-five runners behind Shirley Heights. It was reported that the colt had "swallowed his tongue".

Inkerman was equipped with a tongue strap when he ran in the Irish Derby at the Curragh on 1 July. He produced a much better performance than he had done at Epsom and finished fourth behind Shirley Heights, Exdirectory and Hawaiian Sound, beaten by less than a length and a half by the winner. The colt's next two runs were disappointing. At the end he finished fourth to Sexton Blake in the Gordon Stakes at Goodwood Racecourse after Piggott employed exaggerated waiting tactics. In the Blandford Stakes at the Curragh in August he came home third behind Valley Forge and Rathdowney, looking to be unsuited by the prevailing soft ground.

On 23 September the third running of the Joe McGrath Memorial Stakes over ten furlongs at Leopardstown Racecourse on 23 September saw Inkerman, with Piggott in the saddle, start the 13/8 favourite in a seven-runner field. Sexton Blake started second favourite ahead of the filly More So while the best of the other runners appeared to be the four-year-old Orchestra (winner of the John Porter Stakes). Inkerman went to the front soon after the start and never looked to be in the slightest danger of defeat as he turned into the straight with a clear advantage and won by four lengths from Sexton Blake.

In October Inkerman was put up for auction at Hollywood Park and was sold for $1,000,000, a world record auction price for a horse in training. He remained in the United States and ran thenceforth in the colours of Edward Hudson.

For his efforts in 1978, Inkerman was given a rating of 126 by the Independent Timeform organisation, making him even pounds inferior to their top-rated three-year-old Ile de Bourbon. In the official International Classification he was rated six pounds behind Ile de Bourbon, making him the seventh-best three-year-old colt of the season in Europe.

=== 1979: four-year-old season ===
In 1979 Inkerman was based in California where he was trained by Charlie Whittingham. The colt took time to acclimatise to North American racing and was beaten in his first three starts before winning an allowance race at Hollywood Park on 17 June. In July he was stepped up in class and showed improved form to finish third in both the American Handicap and the Sunset Handicap.

=== 1980: five-year-old season ===
In 1980 Inkerman continued to race exclusively in California. He was beaten in allowance races on his first two starts and then ran second to Bold Tropic in the American Handicap. On 21 July on his final racecourse appearance, he made his second attempt to win the Sunset Handicap. Ridden by Willie Shoemaker, he won the race, beating his front-running stablemate Obraztsovy into second place.

== Stud record ==
At the end of his racing career, Inkerman was retired to become a breeding stallion in the United States. He appears to have attracted little interest from breeders and sired no winners of any consequence. His last reported foals were born in 1988.

== Pedigree ==
Pedigree of Inkerman (USA), bay stallion, 1975
| Sire Vaguely Noble (IRE) 1965 | Vienna (GB); 1957 | Aureole | Hyperion* |
| Sire Vaguely Noble (IRE) 1965 | Vienna (GB); 1957 | Aureole | Angelola |
| Sire Vaguely Noble (IRE) 1965 | Vienna (GB); 1957 | Turkish Blood | Turkhan |
| Sire Vaguely Noble (IRE) 1965 | Vienna (GB); 1957 | Turkish Blood | Rusk |
| Sire Vaguely Noble (IRE) 1965 | Noble Lassie (GB); 1956 | Nearco | Pharos |
| Sire Vaguely Noble (IRE) 1965 | Noble Lassie (GB); 1956 | Nearco | Nogara |
| Sire Vaguely Noble (IRE) 1965 | Noble Lassie (GB); 1956 | Belle Sauvage | Big Game |
| Sire Vaguely Noble (IRE) 1965 | Noble Lassie (GB); 1956 | Belle Sauvage | Tropical Sun* |
| Dam Crimea (USA) 1961 | Princequillo (IRE); 1940 | Prince Rose | Rose Prince |
| Dam Crimea (USA) 1961 | Princequillo (IRE); 1940 | Prince Rose | Indolence |
| Dam Crimea (USA) 1961 | Princequillo (IRE); 1940 | Cosquilla | Papyrus |
| Dam Crimea (USA) 1961 | Princequillo (IRE); 1940 | Cosquilla | Quick Thought |
| Dam Crimea (USA) 1961 | Victoria Cross (GB); 1953 | Court Martial | Fair Trial |
| Dam Crimea (USA) 1961 | Victoria Cross (GB); 1953 | Court Martial | Intantaneous |
| Dam Crimea (USA) 1961 | Victoria Cross (GB); 1953 | Ladycross | Mieuxce |
| Dam Crimea (USA) 1961 | Victoria Cross (GB); 1953 | Ladycross | Eleanor Cross* (Family: 14-c) |

* Inkerman is inbred 4S x 5S x 5D to the stallion Hyperion, meaning that he appears fourth generation and fifth generation (via Tropical Sun) on the sire side of his pedigree, and fifth generation (via Eleanor Cross) on the dam side of his pedigree.
