= Buoy (horse) =

British-bred Thoroughbred racehorse

- Sire: Aureole
- Grandsire: Hyperion
- Dam: Ripeck
- Damsire: Ribot
- Sex: Stallion
- Foaled: 7 April 1970
- Country: United Kingdom
- Colour: Chestnut
- Breeder: Dick Hollingsorth
- Owner: Dick Hollingsorth
- Trainer: Dick Hern
- Record: 15: 6-3-1

Major wins
- Predominate Stakes (1973); Great Voltigeur Stakes (1973); Yorkshire Cup (1974); Coronation Cup (1974); Princess of Wales's Stakes (1974)

Awards
- Timeform rating 121 (1973), 125 (1974)

Buoy (7 April 1970 – 1984) was a British Thoroughbred racehorse and sire. Unraced as a two-year-old, he proved himself one of the best middle-distance colts of his generation in 1973 when he won the Predominate Stakes and the Great Voltigeur Stakes and finished placed in both the Irish Derby and the St Leger. He was even better as a four-year-old, winning the Yorkshire Cup before beating the outstanding French filly Dahlia in the Coronation Cup and taking the Princess of Wales's Stakes. His career was ended by injury in August 1974 and he was exported to stand as a breeding stallion where he had limited success as a sire of winners.

== Background ==
Buoy was a "big, robust, long-striding" chestnut horse with three white socks and a white star and snip bred by his owner Richard Dunbavin "Dick" Hollingsworth at his Arches Hall Stud in Hertfordshire. He was sired by Aureole who won the King George VI and Queen Elizabeth Stakes in the ownership of Queen Elizabeth II in 1954: Aureole's other successful progeny included St. Paddy, Provoke, Aurelius and the Prix de l'Arc de Triomphe winner Saint Crespin. Buoy's dam Ripeck was a highly successful broodmare whose other offspring included the Queen Alexandra Stakes winner Balinger and the Oaks Stakes winner Bireme. Ripeck was a granddaughter of the Hollingsworth family's influential broodmare Felucca, whose other descendants included Cut Above, Longboat, Sharp Edge (Irish 2,000 Guineas), Bolas (Irish Oaks), Dash for Cash (Australian Guineas) and Daffodil (AJC Oaks).

Hollingsworth sent his colt into training with Dick Hern at West Ilsley in Berkshire. He was ridden in most of his races by Joe Mercer.

== Racing career ==
=== 1973: three-year-old season ===
Buoy was slow to mature and did not race as a two-year-old. After finishing fifth in a maiden race over eleven furlongs on his racecourse debut in the spring of 1973 he recorded his first win in a similar event at Newmarket Racecourse, beating twenty opponents. He was then moved up in class for the Predominate Stakes (a trial race for The Derby) at Goodwood in May. He won by four lengths from the Thirsk Classic Trial winner Funny Fellow despite hanging badly to the left in the last quarter mile. Buoy's connections opted to bypass the Epsom Derby, running him instead in the Irish Derby at Curragh in late June. Equipped with blinkers for the first time he raced in second behind the runaway pacemaker Park Lawn before taking the lead on the final turn, but was overtaken in the straight and finished third behind the 33/1 outsider Weaver's Hall and Ragapan.

The blinkers were left off when Buoy started 11/10 favourite for the Great Voltigeur Stakes (a trial race for the St Leger) at York Racecourse in August. He took the lead in the straight and held off a challenge from the Gordon Stakes winner Duke of Ragusa to win by three-quarters of a length. In the St Leger at Doncaster Racecourse in September the blinkers were reapplied and Buoy wore them in most of his remaining races. His opponents included Ragapan, Duke of Ragusa, the Epsom Derby runner-up Cavo Doro and the French challenger Valuta (Prix Kergorlay). He took the lead two furlongs out but was overtaken by the 28/1 outsider Peleid who won easily by two and a half lengths, with Buoy holding on to second place, just ahead of Duke of Ragusa and King Levanstell. On his final appearance of the season, Buoy was sent to France to contest the Prix de l'Arc de Triomphe at Longchamp Racecourse on 7 October. He raced just behind the leaders but was unable to quicken in the straight and finished eighth of the twenty-seven runners behind Rheingold.

=== 1974: four-year-old season ===
In addition to blinkers, Buoy was fitted with a tongue-tie for his second campaign. On his first appearance as a four-year-old, he finished fifth behind Freefoot in the John Porter Stakes at Newbury Racecousre and then finished second, conceding eight pounds to the winner Relay Race, in the Jockey Club Stakes at Newmarket. At York in May he was moved up in distance and started 11/8 favourite for the fourteen furlong Yorkshire Cup in which he was matched against the seven-year-old Petty Officer, at that time the highest-earning gelding in British racing history. Buoy tracked Petty Officer throughout the race before accelerating clear in the final furlong to win easily by three lengths with the St Simon Stakes winner Ballyhot in third.

At Epsom Downs Racecourse in June, the colt started at odds of 4/1 for the Coronation Cup. His four opponents were the 1973 King George VI and Queen Elizabeth Stakes winner Dahlia, the Grand Prix de Paris winner Tennyson, the Irish St. Leger winner Conor Pass and Ballyhot. With all five jockeys instructed to employ waiting tactics the race was run at a very slow pace before Mercer opted to use Buoy's stamina and sent the colt into the lead. Buoy quickly opened up a big advantage and was ten lengths clear on the final turn. He tired badly in the closing stages but held on to win by one and a half lengths from Tennyson, with a gap of three lengths back to Dahlia in third. In the Hardwicke Stakes at Royal Ascot later that month, he failed by half a length to concede four pounds to Relay Race, rallying strongly after being headed in the straight. In July at Newmarket, he started 15/8 favourite for the Princess of Wales's Stakes. He tracked the leader Arthurian before accelerating into a clear lead two furlongs out and winning by two lengths from the Chester Vase winner Jupiter Pluvius. Buoy then contested Britain's most important weight-for-age race, the King George VI and Queen Elizabeth Stakes at Ascot on 27 July. He moved up in the straight to challenge Snow Knight for the lead but was outpaced in the closing stages and finished fourth behind Dahlia, Highclere and Dankaro.

Buoy was sent to France for the second time in his racing career to contest the Grand Prix de Deauville over 2700 metres on 25 August. He started the 6/1 third favourite, but ran very poorly, finishing towards the back of the sixteen-runner field behind the subsequently disqualified Admetus. He was found to have sustained a serious tendon injury in the race and never ran again.

== Assessment ==
There was no International Classification of European three-year-olds in 1973: the official handicappers of Britain, Ireland and France compiled separate rankings for horses which competed in those countries. In the British handicap he was rated nine pounds behind the joint top-rated Thatch and Dahlia. The independent Timeform organisation gave him a rating of 121, fifteen pounds behind their top-rated three-year-old Thatch. In their annual Racehorses of 1973 Timeform described him as "genuine and consistent", but "not an easy ride".

In the British handicap for 1974 Buoy was ranked sixth among the older horses, level with Ragstone and behind Dahlia, Admetus and the sprinters Blue Cashmere, New Model and Singing Bede. Timeform gave him a rating of 125, eleven pounds behind their Horse of the Year Allez France. Racehorses of 1974 described him as "the best older horse in England at around a mile and a half".

== Stud record ==
After his retirement from racing, Buoy was sold for "a six-figure sum" and exported to stand as a breeding stallion in Australia. He was not a great success at stud, but did sire Galleon, a colt who won the VATC Futurity in 1982. His last reported foals were born in 1981 and he died in 1984.

== Pedigree ==
Pedigree of Buoy (GB), chestnut stallion, 1970
Sire Aureole (GB) 1950	Hyperion (GB); 1930	Gainsborough	Bayardo
Sire Aureole (GB) 1950	Hyperion (GB); 1930	Gainsborough	Rosedrop
Sire Aureole (GB) 1950	Hyperion (GB); 1930	Selene	Chaucer
Sire Aureole (GB) 1950	Hyperion (GB); 1930	Selene	Serenissima
Sire Aureole (GB) 1950	Angelola (GB); 1945	Donatello	Blenheim
Sire Aureole (GB) 1950	Angelola (GB); 1945	Donatello	Delleana
Sire Aureole (GB) 1950	Angelola (GB); 1945	Feola	Friar Marcus
Sire Aureole (GB) 1950	Angelola (GB); 1945	Feola	Aloe
Dam Ripeck (GB) 1959	Ribot (GB); 1952	Tenerani	Bellini
Dam Ripeck (GB) 1959	Ribot (GB); 1952	Tenerani	Tofanella
Dam Ripeck (GB) 1959	Ribot (GB); 1952	Romanella	El Greco
Dam Ripeck (GB) 1959	Ribot (GB); 1952	Romanella	Barbara Burrini
Dam Ripeck (GB) 1959	Kyak (GB); 1953	Big Game	Bahram
Dam Ripeck (GB) 1959	Kyak (GB); 1953	Big Game	Myrobella
Dam Ripeck (GB) 1959	Kyak (GB); 1953	Felucca	Nearco
Dam Ripeck (GB) 1959	Kyak (GB); 1953	Felucca	Felsetta (Family: 11-d)
