= Sporting Yankee =

American-bred Thoroughbred racehorse

- Sire: Vaguely Noble
- Grandsire: Vienna (horse)
- Dam: Sale Day
- Damsire: To Market
- Sex: Stallion
- Foaled: 31 January 1974
- Country: United States
- Colour: Bay
- Breeder: Nelson Bunker Hunt
- Owner: William Hill Racing
- Trainer: Peter Walwyn
- Record: 13: 3-3-1

Major wins
- William Hill Futurity (1976); March Stakes (1977)

Awards
- Timeform rating 123 (1976), 117 (1976), 100 (1977)

Sporting Yankee (foaled 31 January 1974) was an American-bred, British-trained Thoroughbred racehorse. He showed great promise as a two-year-old in 1976 when he won two of his three races including the Group One William Hill Futurity. In the following year he ran poorly when strongly-fancied for the 2000 Guineas but won the March Stakes and finished second in both the Craven Stakes and the Geoffrey Freer Stakes. He failed to win in four races in 1978 and was retired from racing to become a breeding stallion in Brazil.

== Background ==
Sporting Yankee was a "tall" bay horse with a white blaze and a white sock on his right foreleg bred in Kentucky by Nelson Bunker Hunt. His sire, Vaguely Noble, won the Prix de l'Arc de Triomphe in 1968 before becoming a successful breeding stallion whose best progeny included Dahlia, Exceller and Empery. Sporting Yankee's dam Sale Day was a top-class racemare who won the Spinster Stakes in 1968 and produced several other winners including the Yellow Ribbon Stakes winner Amazer. She was also a sister of Hurry to Market the American Champion Two-Year-Old Male Horse of 1963.

As a yearling Sporting Yankee was offered for sale and auctioned for $90,000 by representatives of the British bookmaking firm William Hill Racing. He was sent to race in England where he was trained at Lambourn by Peter Walwyn. Until 1975, British racehorses did not allow horse names which advertised companies: the relaxation of the rules allowed the colt to be named to promote the Yankee, a popular four-horse combination bet offered by UK bookmakers.

== Racing career ==
=== 1976: two-year-old season ===
Sporting Yankee began his racing career in a seven furlong maiden race at Newmarket Racecourse in early October in which he overcame an unfavourable draw to finish second to Sin Timon, a colt who went on to win the Cambridgeshire Handicap in 1977. In the Chesterton Maiden Stakes over the same course and distance two weeks later he drew away from his twenty-six opponents in the last quarter mile to win by four lengths.

At the end of October, the colt was moved up sharply in class for the William Hill Futurity over one mile at Doncaster Racecourse. The race had previously been known as the Timeform Gold Cup and the Observer Gold Cup before Sporting Yankee's owner took over the sponsorship in 1976. Ridden by Pat Eddery and racing on very soft ground he started at odds of 9/2 against five opponents headed by the Vincent O'Brien-trained Valinsky who was made the odds on favourite after winning his only previous start in Ireland by five lengths. The other four runners were Orchestra (winner of the Beresford Stakes), Juge de Paix (runner-up in the Prix La Rochette) and the 66/1 outsiders Sultan's Ruby and Atwood. Sporting Yankee took an early lead, then settled into second behind Sultan's Roby before moving back to the front at half way. He stayed on strongly in the straight to win by two lengths from Sultan's Ruby with a gap of four lengths back to Orchestra in third.

=== 1977: three-year-old season ===
On his three-year-old debut Sporting Yankee contested the Craven Stakes (a major trial race for the 2000 Guineas) over one mile at Newmarket in April. He was beaten a head by the Guy Harwood-trained Limone, to whom he was conceding ten pounds. In the 2000 Guineas over the same course and distance he started joint-second favourite behind The Minstrel, but finished unplaced in a race won by Nebbiolo. He was then moved up in distance for the Predominate Stakes over a mile and a half at Goodwood Racecourse in May and finished fourth behind Royal Blend.

After a break of almost three months, Sporting Yankee returned in the Geoffrey Freer Stakes at Newbury Racecourse in August in which he was matched against older horses for the first time. He was beaten two lengths into second by Valinsky with the four-year-old Norfolk Air in third place. Later in the month he faced only two opponents in the March Stakes over one and three quarter miles at Goodwood and recorded his only success of the year, beating the Barry Hills-trained Crown Bowler by four lengths. On his final appearance of the season the colt was sent to France for the Prix Royal Oak over 3100 metres at Longchamp Racecourse in which he started a 28/1 outsider and finished tenth of the thirteen runners behind Rex Magna.

=== 1978: four-year-old season ===
Sporting Yankee remained in training as a four-year-old but failed to recover his best form. He finished third to Orchestra in the John Porter Stakes on his seasonal debut but ran unplaced in three subsequent races and was retired at the end of the season.

== Assessment ==
There was no International Classification of European two-year-olds in 1976: the official handicappers of Britain, Ireland, and France compiled separate rankings for horses which competed in those countries. In the British Free Handicap, Sporting Yankee was given top-weight of 116 pounds, seventeen pounds behind the top-rated J O Tobin. The independent Timeform organisation were more impressed, giving him a rating of 123, making him seven pounds inferior to J O Tobin and eight behind the French champion Blushing Groom. In their annual Racehorses of 1976 Timeform described him as a "rather weak and gangling" juvenile who was likely to improve as he matured. Timeform gave him a rating of 117 in 1977 and 100 in 1978.

== Stud record ==
After his retirement from racing, Sporting Yankee was exported to Brazil to become a breeding stallion. His last recorded foals were born in 1985.

== Pedigree ==
Pedigree of Sporting Yankee (USA), bay stallion, 1974
Sire Vaguely Noble (IRE) 1965	Vienna (GB); 1957	Aureole	Hyperion*
Sire Vaguely Noble (IRE) 1965	Vienna (GB); 1957	Aureole	Angelola
Sire Vaguely Noble (IRE) 1965	Vienna (GB); 1957	Turkish Blood	Turkhan
Sire Vaguely Noble (IRE) 1965	Vienna (GB); 1957	Turkish Blood	Rusk
Sire Vaguely Noble (IRE) 1965	Noble Lassie (GB); 1956	Nearco	Pharos
Sire Vaguely Noble (IRE) 1965	Noble Lassie (GB); 1956	Nearco	Nogara
Sire Vaguely Noble (IRE) 1965	Noble Lassie (GB); 1956	Belle Sauvage	Big Game
Sire Vaguely Noble (IRE) 1965	Noble Lassie (GB); 1956	Belle Sauvage	Tropical Sun*
Dam Sale Day (USA) 1965	To Market (USA); 1948	Market Wise	Brokers Tip
Dam Sale Day (USA) 1965	To Market (USA); 1948	Market Wise	On Hand
Dam Sale Day (USA) 1965	To Market (USA); 1948	Pretty Does	Johnstown
Dam Sale Day (USA) 1965	To Market (USA); 1948	Pretty Does	Creese
Dam Sale Day (USA) 1965	Hasty Girl (USA); 1951	Princequillo	Prince Rose
Dam Sale Day (USA) 1965	Hasty Girl (USA); 1951	Princequillo	Cosquilla
Dam Sale Day (USA) 1965	Hasty Girl (USA); 1951	In Love	Tintagel
Dam Sale Day (USA) 1965	Hasty Girl (USA); 1951	In Love	Highland Dell (Family: 14-b)

* Sporting Yankee is inbred 4S x 5S to the stallion Hyperion, meaning that he appears fourth generation and fifth generation (via Tropical Sun) on the sire side of his pedigree.
