= Gay Mecene =

American-bred Thoroughbred racehorse

- Sire: Vaguely Noble
- Grandsire: Vienna
- Dam: Gay Missile
- Damsire: Sir Gaylord
- Sex: Stallion
- Foaled: 16 May 1975
- Country: United States
- Colour: Dark Bay or Brown
- Breeder: Jacqueline M. Getty
- Owner: Jacques Wertheimer
- Trainer: Alec Head
- Record: 12: 5-2-2

Major wins
- Prix de Guiche (1978); Prix Eugène Adam (1978); Prix Niel (1978); Grand Prix de Saint-Cloud (1979)

Awards
- Top-rated French-trained older horse (1979); Timeform rating 125 (1978), 128 (1979)

Honours
- Prix Gay Mecene at Saint-Cloud Racecourse

Gay Mecene (16 May 1975 – 24 December 1998) was an American-bred, French-trained Thoroughbred racehorse and sire. After winning his only race as a two-year-old in 1977, he developed into one of the best French-trained colts of his generation when he won the Prix de Guiche, Prix Eugène Adam and Prix Niel. Although he won only once in six races in the following year he showed arguably his best form when easily beating a top-class field in the Grand Prix de Saint-Cloud and running second to Troy in the King George VI and Queen Elizabeth Stakes. He later stood as a breeding stallion in France and Japan and had some success as a sire of winners.

== Background ==
Gay Mecene was a dark bay or brown horse with no white markings bred in Kentucky by Jacqueline Getty. His sire, Vaguely Noble, won the Prix de l'Arc de Triomphe in 1968 before becoming a successful breeding stallion whose best progeny included Dahlia, Exceller and Empery. Gay Mecene's dam Gay Missile was a high-class racemare whose wins included the Ashland Stakes in 1970 before becoming an influential broodmare whose other descendants included Duke of Marmalade, Lemon Drop Kid, A.P. Indy and Summer Squall.

As a yearling Gay Mecene was sent to Europe and offered for sale at the Newmarket Houghton sales where he was bought for 60,000 guineas by representatives of the French businessman Jacques Wertheimer. He was then sent to France where he was trained by Alec Head at Chantilly.

== Racing career ==
=== 1977: two-year-old season ===
Gay Mecene made one appearance as a two-year-old in 1977, recording a short-head victory in a maiden race over 1600 metres at Saint-Cloud Racecourse.

=== 1978: three-year-old season ===
On his three-year-old debut, Gay Mecene was matched against Super Concorde, the top-rated French two-year-old of 1977, in the Group Three Prix de Guiche over 1950m at Longchamp Racecourse on 19 April. Starting the 3.9/1 second favourite, he was always going well and won comfortably by one and a half lengths from Peloppones, with Super Concorde running poorly in fifth. The win established Gay Mecene as a contender for the French Classic Races but when moved up to Group One class for the Prix Lupin on 14 May he finished fourth behind Acamas, Pyjama Hunt and Turville after having briefly held the lead in the straight.

Gay Mecene bypassed the Prix du Jockey Club and reappeared in the Prix Eugène Adam at Saint-Cloud on 16 July in which he started second favourite behind Pyjama Hunt, who had finished fourth in The Derby and was carrying five pounds less weight. Gay Mecene led from the start and set a steady pace before accelerating in the straight and winning by three quarters of a length and a neck from Rusticaro and Pyjama Hunt with the 2000 Guineas winner Roland Gardens in fourth.

After another long break, Gay Mecene returned on 10 September for the Prix Niel over 2200m at Longchamp. On this occasion, Freddy Head employed different tactics, restraining the colt towards the rear of the ten runner field before making his challenge in the straight. He moved up to contest the lead in the last 200m and won by a short head from Noir et Or, with the pair finishing five lengths clear of the Prix du Jockey-Club runner-up Frere Basile in third. Gay Mecene was regarded as a major contender for France's most valuable and prestigious race, the Prix de l'Arc de Triomphe over 2400m at Longchamp on 1 October and starting the 4/1 third favourite, coupled in the betting with his stable companion Dancing Maid. Ridden by Jean-Claude Desaint (Freddy Head opted to ride Dancing Maid), Gay Mecene was held up at the back of the field and was still only sixteenth of the eighteen runners on the final turn. He made steady progress in the straight but never threatened the leaders and finished eighth behind Alleged.

=== 1979: four-year-old season ===
Gay Mecene began his third season in the Grand Prix d'Evry over 2400 m at Evry Racecourse on 12 May in which he dead-heated for second place with Vagaries, two lengths behind the winner Noir et Or. Three weeks later, the colt was sent to race outside France for the first time when he contested the Coronation Cup over one and a half miles on soft ground at Epsom Downs Racecourse. He finished a well beaten third of the four runners behind Ile de Bourbon and Frere Basile, but appeared to have a legitimate excuse, as his jockey reported that the colt had never recovered after being struck in the eye by a clod of earth.

Gay Mecene returned to France for the Grand Prix de Saint-Cloud over 2500 m on 1 July. After three consecutive defeats he started at odds of 12/1 in a strong field which included Noir et Or, Ela-Mana-Mou, Frere Basile, Soleil Noir (Grand Prix de Paris), Trillion, Obraztsovy (Hardwicke Stakes) and El Badr (Prix du Cadran). Head held the colt up at the back of the field before making progress on the turn into the straight. He took the lead 300 m from the finish and accelerated clear of his rivals to record his first Group One success by four lengths from Ela-Mana-Mou: according to Timeform he "crushed" the opposition. Three weeks later, Gay Mecene made a second visit to Britain when he contested the United Kingdom's most prestigious weight-for-age race, the King George VI and Queen Elizabeth Stakes over one and a half miles at Ascot Racecourse. He was opposed again by Ela-Mana-Mou, but the 2/5 favourite was Troy, who had won the Epsom Derby and the Irish Derby by seven lengths and four lengths respectively. Gay Macene was the only horse to mount a serious challenge, chasing the British colt throughout the last quarter mile and finishing second, one and a half lengths behind the winner despite swerving to the right in the final furlong.

On 9 September at Longchamp, Gay Mecene started odds-on favourite for the Prix Foy, a trial race for the Prix de l'Arc de Triomphe. He finished third behind Pevero and Trillion, conceding seven pounds to the winner and five to the runner-up. The colt bypassed the Arc, which the Head stable won with Three Troikas, and was instead sent to Germany for the Preis von Europa at Cologne-Weidenpesch Racecourse. He started favourite, but ran poorly, finishing seventh behind Nebos.

== Assessment ==
In 1978, the independent Timeform organisation gave Gay Mecene a rating of 125, eight pounds below the top-rated three-year-old Ile de Bourbon. In the inaugural International Classification, a collaboration between the official handicappers of France, Ireland and the United Kingdom, Gay Mecene was rated the twelfth-best three-year-old colt in Europe. In the following year, Gay Mecene was rated 128 by Timeform, nine pounds below their Horse of the Year Troy. In the International Classification, he was rated the best older horse in France and the seventh best horse of any age in Europe.

== Stud record ==
Gay Mecene was retired from racing to stand as a breeding stallion at the Head family's Haras du Quesnay stud near Deauville. He was exported to Japan in 1986 and died there on 24 December 1998. His best winners included:

- Gay Minstrel, foaled 1981, Prix Messidor, Prix Perth
- Almeira, 1981, Prix Marcel Boussac, Prix du Calvados
- Long Mick, 1981, Prix de Condé, Grand Prix d'Evry
- Noblequest, 1982, Prix de la Salamandre, Prix du Bois
- Balbonella, 1984, Prix Robert Papin, Prix de la Porte Maillot, Dahlia Handicap, dam of Anabaa
- Gaelic Bird, 1987, Prix Chloé, Prix de Sandringham

== Pedigree ==
Pedigree of Gay Mecene (USA), bay stallion, 1975
Sire Vaguely Noble (IRE) 1965	Vienna (GB); 1957	Aureole	Hyperion*
Sire Vaguely Noble (IRE) 1965	Vienna (GB); 1957	Aureole	Angelola
Sire Vaguely Noble (IRE) 1965	Vienna (GB); 1957	Turkish Blood	Turkhan
Sire Vaguely Noble (IRE) 1965	Vienna (GB); 1957	Turkish Blood	Rusk
Sire Vaguely Noble (IRE) 1965	Noble Lassie (GB); 1956	Nearco*	Pharos*
Sire Vaguely Noble (IRE) 1965	Noble Lassie (GB); 1956	Nearco*	Nogara*
Sire Vaguely Noble (IRE) 1965	Noble Lassie (GB); 1956	Belle Sauvage	Big Game
Sire Vaguely Noble (IRE) 1965	Noble Lassie (GB); 1956	Belle Sauvage	Tropical Sun*
Dam Gay Missile (USA) 1967	Sir Gaylord (USA); 1959	Turn-To	Royal Charger*
Dam Gay Missile (USA) 1967	Sir Gaylord (USA); 1959	Turn-To	Source Sucree
Dam Gay Missile (USA) 1967	Sir Gaylord (USA); 1959	Somethingroyal	Princequillo
Dam Gay Missile (USA) 1967	Sir Gaylord (USA); 1959	Somethingroyal	Imperatrice
Dam Gay Missile (USA) 1967	Missy Baba (USA); 1958	My Babu	Djebel
Dam Gay Missile (USA) 1967	Missy Baba (USA); 1958	My Babu	Perfume
Dam Gay Missile (USA) 1967	Missy Baba (USA); 1958	Uvira	Umidwar
Dam Gay Missile (USA) 1967	Missy Baba (USA); 1958	Uvira	Lady Lawless (Family: 3-l)

* Gay Mecene is inbred 3S x 5D to the stallion Nearco, meaning that he appears third generation on the sire side of his pedigree, and fifth generation (via Royal Charger) on the dam side of his pedigree.

* Gay Mecene is inbred 4S x 5S to the stallion Hyperion, meaning that he appears fourth generation and fifth generation (via Tropical Sun) on the sire side of his pedigree.
