= Vaguely Noble =

Irish-bred Thoroughbred champion racehorse

- Sire: Vienna (GB)
- Grandsire: Aureole
- Dam: Noble Lassie (GB)
- Damsire: Nearco (ITY)
- Sex: Stallion
- Foaled: 1965
- Country: Ireland
- Colour: Bay
- Breeder: Major Lionel B. Holliday
- Owner: 1. Mr L.B. Holliday, 2. Nelson Bunker Hunt, Dr & Mrs Franklyn; John R. Gaines (25%) share
- Trainer: 1. Walter Wharton (1965–1967); 2. Paddy Prendergast; 3. Etienne Pollet (1968)
- Record: 9: 6–2–1
- Earnings: $366,647; (£18,443 in Great Britain)

Major wins
- Observer Gold Cup (1967); Prix de Guiche (1968); Prix du Lys (1968); Prix de Chantilly (1968); Prix de l'Arc de Triomphe (1968)

Awards
- Leading sire in GB & Ireland (1973 & 1974); Leading broodmare sire in GB & Ireland (1982); Timeform rating: 140
- Last updated on 1 April 2022

Vaguely Noble (1965–1989) was an Irish-bred Thoroughbred racehorse who competed in the United Kingdom and France. The colt is best known as the winner of the 1968 Group One Prix de l'Arc de Triomphe when he defeated the best horses from England, France, Ireland and Italy. He was later a leading sire in Great Britain & Ireland and a Leading broodmare sire in GB & Ireland. Vaguely Noble is one of the highest-rated horses ever to run in Europe.

== Background ==
Major Lionel B. Holliday bred Vaguely Noble who was foaled in 1965. Vaguely Noble was by Vienna (GB) who won six races and £27,970 before he was exported to France and then to Japan. His dam was the Lancashire Oaks winner, Noble Lassie (GB) was by Nearco (ITY) from Belle Sauvage by Big Game. Noble Lassie was the dam of several other horses, but Vaguely Noble was her only graded stakes winner. Vaguely Noble was inbred to Hyperion in the third and fourth generation (3m x 4f) and also to Bahram in the fourth generation (4m x 4f).

Major Lionel B. Holliday died in 1965; as a two-year-old Vaguely Noble raced in the colours of the Major's son, Brook Holliday. Vaguely Noble was sold at the end of his two-year-old season and was subsequently owned by Americans Wilma Franklyn and Nelson Bunker Hunt.

== Racing record ==
Racing at age two, Vaguely Noble finished second in his first two races then won his last two, including the Observer Gold Cup by seven lengths, pulling up, to end the 1967 season. In December of that year he was sold at auction by the Estate of Major Lionel B. Holliday, for 136,000 guineas ($342,720), a record price for a racehorse. He was purchased by Albert Yank, acting for Dr and Mrs Franklyn.

In 1968 he was sent to race in France, where his conditioning was taken over by Etienne Pollet. Vaguely Noble won four of his five starts, including the Prix de Guiche (by 3 lengths), Prix du Lys (by 8 lengths), Prix de Chantilly and France's most prestigious race, the Prix de l'Arc de Triomphe at Longchamp, defeating the brilliant Derby winner Sir Ivor.

== Stud record ==
In 1968, a 25% share in Vaguely Noble was acquired for $1.25 million by John R. Gaines of Lexington, Kentucky to make this a world-record stallion syndication valuation of $5 million. Vaguely Noble was sent to stand at stud at Gainesway Farm in Lexington.

Highly successful, he sired 70 graded stakes race winners, and was the broodmare sire of more than 165 stakes winners. In 1973 and 1974 he was the Leading sire in GB & Ireland, mostly due to the victories of his great daughter, Dahlia. Vaguely Noble placed second in 1977 to Bold Ruler with 263 starters earning the equivalent of US$5,293,153 in Europe and North America. Vaguely Noble was also the leading broodmare sire in 1982.

His most important progeny included:

- Ace of Aces, won (Sussex Stakes)
- Dahlia (15 wins, US$1,532,442, inc. Benson and Hedges Gold Cup - twice, Washington, D.C. International Stakes, King George VI and Queen Elizabeth Stakes - twice; Eclipse Award for Outstanding Female Turf Horse and was inducted into the United States Racing Hall of Fame, etc.
- El Cuite (won Prix Royal-Oak, Gran Premio d' Italia)
- Empery, 1976 Epsom Derby winner
- Estrapade (Santa Ana Handicap, Arlington Million and Oak Tree Invitational Stakes)
- Exceller (15 wins, US$1,654,002 inc. Prix du Lys, Grand Prix de Paris, Prix Royal-Oak, Coronation Cup, Grand Prix de Saint-Cloud, Canadian International Stakes, Hollywood Gold Cup, Hollywood Invitational Turf Handicap etc.), Jockey Club Gold Cup
- Friendswood (Gran Premio del Jockey Club and Premio Lydia Tesio)
- Gay Mecene, Grand Prix de Saint-Cloud
- Inkerman, Joe McGrath Memorial Stakes
- Jet Ski Lady, Epsom Oaks
- Lemhi Gold (8 wins, US$1,110445 inc. Jockey Club Gold Cup, Marlboro Cup Invitational Handicap and 1982 American Champion Older Male Horse etc.)
- Noble Decree, Observer Gold Cup
- Noble Bijou (USA) exported to New Zealand where he sired 59 stakes winners that had 157 stakes wins.
- Sporting Yankee, William Hill Futurity

Vaguely Noble died in 1989 at the age of 24 and was buried in the equine cemetery at Gainesway Farm.

== Assessment ==
Vaguely Noble is regarded as one of the best European horses of the post World War II-era. He won six of his nine starts in England and France for the equivalent of US$366,647 in prize-money, earning a Timeform rating of 140.

Vaguely Noble, Ribot and Sea-Bird are sometimes considered the greatest winners of the Prix de l'Arc de Triomphe.

== Sire line tree ==
- Vaguely Noble
  - Ace of Aces
    - Jacksboro
  - Noble Decree
  - Noble Bijou
    - Allez Bijou
    - Prince Majestic
    - Alibhai
    - Lomondy
    - Be Noble
    - The Phantom
    - The Phantom Chance
  - Empery
    - Barbery
    - Blue Finn
  - Exceller
  - Sporting Yankee
  - Gay Mecene
    - Gay Minstrel
    - Long Mick
    - Noblequest
  - Inkerman
  - Lemhi Gold
  - El Cuite

== Pedigree ==
Pedigree of Vaguely Noble (IRE), bay stallion, 1965
Sire Vienna (GB) Bay 1957	Aureole; Chestnut 1950	Hyperion*	Gainsborough*
Sire Vienna (GB) Bay 1957	Aureole; Chestnut 1950	Hyperion*	Selene*
Sire Vienna (GB) Bay 1957	Aureole; Chestnut 1950	Angelola	Donatello (FR)
Sire Vienna (GB) Bay 1957	Aureole; Chestnut 1950	Angelola	Feola
Sire Vienna (GB) Bay 1957	Turkish Blood (IRE); Bay 1944	Turkhan	Bahram*
Sire Vienna (GB) Bay 1957	Turkish Blood (IRE); Bay 1944	Turkhan	Theresina
Sire Vienna (GB) Bay 1957	Turkish Blood (IRE); Bay 1944	Rusk	Manna (IRE)*
Sire Vienna (GB) Bay 1957	Turkish Blood (IRE); Bay 1944	Rusk	Baby Polly (IRE)
Dam Noble Lassie (GB) Bay 1956	Nearco (ITY); Bay 1935	Pharos (GB)	Phalaris*
Dam Noble Lassie (GB) Bay 1956	Nearco (ITY); Bay 1935	Pharos (GB)	Scapa Flow
Dam Noble Lassie (GB) Bay 1956	Nearco (ITY); Bay 1935	Nogara	Havresac (FR)
Dam Noble Lassie (GB) Bay 1956	Nearco (ITY); Bay 1935	Nogara	Catnip (IRE)
Dam Noble Lassie (GB) Bay 1956	Belle Sauvage; Chestnut 1949	Big Game	Bahram*
Dam Noble Lassie (GB) Bay 1956	Belle Sauvage; Chestnut 1949	Big Game	Myrobella
Dam Noble Lassie (GB) Bay 1956	Belle Sauvage; Chestnut 1949	Tropical Sun	Hyperion*
Dam Noble Lassie (GB) Bay 1956	Belle Sauvage; Chestnut 1949	Tropical Sun	Brulette (FR)(Family: 1-d)

* Vaguely Noble is inbred 3S x 4D to the stallion Hyperion, meaning that he appears third generation on the sire side of his pedigree, and fourth generation on the dam side of his pedigree.

* Vaguely Noble is inbred 4S x 4D to the stallion Bahram, meaning that he appears fourth generation on the sire side of his pedigree, and fourth generation on the dam side of his pedigree.

* Vaguely Noble is inbred 5S x 4D to the stallion Phalaris, meaning that he appears fifth generation (via Manna) on the sire side of his pedigree, and fourth generation on the dam side of his pedigree.
