= Dahlia (horse) =

American-bred Thoroughbred racehorse

- Racing silks of Nelson Bunker Hunt
- Sire: Vaguely Noble
- Grandsire: Vienna
- Dam: Charming Alibi
- Damsire: Honeys Alibi
- Sex: Mare
- Foaled: 25 March 1970
- Country: United States
- Colour: Chestnut
- Breeder: Nelson Bunker Hunt
- Owner: Nelson Bunker Hunt; Allen E. Paulson
- Trainer: Maurice Zilber; Charlie Whittingham
- Record: 46: 15-3-7
- Earnings: $1,489,105

Major wins
- Prix Yacowlef (1972); Prix de la Grotte (1973); Prix Saint-Alary (1973); Irish Oaks (1973); King George VI and Queen Elizabeth Stakes (1973, 1974); Prix Niel (1973); Washington, D.C. International (1973); Grand Prix de Saint-Cloud (1974); Benson and Hedges Gold Cup (1974, 1975); Man O' War Stakes (1974); Canadian International Stakes (1974); Hollywood Invitational Handicap (1976)

Awards
- Timeform top-rated 3-y-o filly (1973); Top-rated 3-y-o filly in Britain (1973); British Horse of the Year (1973, 1974); U.S. Champion Turf Horse (1974); Timeform rating: 135

Honours
- United States Racing Hall of Fame; Canadian Horse Racing Hall of Fame; Dahlia Handicap at Hollywood Park Racetrack; Dahlia Stakes at Newmarket Racecourse

Dahlia (March 25, 1970 – April 6, 2001) was an American-bred Thoroughbred racehorse and broodmare. She won major races in France, England, Ireland, Canada, and the United States and also competed in Italy as well. She was the first Thoroughbred mare to earn more than $1 million and was one of the pioneers of inter-continental racing.

Originally trained in France, she showed early promise by winning the Prix Yacowlef on her debut as a two-year-old but failed to win again that year. In the following season she developed into a top-class middle-distance performer, winning the Prix de la Grotte, Prix Saint-Alary and Irish Oaks against her own sex before defeating male opposition King George VI and Queen Elizabeth Stakes, Prix Niel and Washington, D.C. International. She was voted British horse of the year and was the equal-top-rated three-year-old filly in Europe. In the following year she won a second King George VI and Queen Elizabeth Stakes as well as the Grand Prix de Saint-Cloud, Benson and Hedges Gold Cup, Man O' War Stakes and Canadian International Stakes. She was voted British horse of the year for a second time and took the Eclipse Award for Champion Turf Horse. She was less successful at five but did record an upset victory over Grundy to take a second Benson and Hedges Gold Cup. She was transferred to the United States and won the Hollywood Invitational Handicap.

After her retirement from racing she became a very successful broodmare, producing several major winners. She died in 2001 at the age of 31. Dahlia has been inducted into both the United States Racing Hall of Fame and the Canadian Horse Racing Hall of Fame.

== Background ==
Dahlia was a chestnut mare with a narrow white blaze bred and owned by the Texas oilman Nelson Bunker Hunt. The filly was sent to Europe to be trained in France by Maurice Zilber.

Her sire, Vaguely Noble, won the Prix de l'Arc de Triomphe in 1968 before becoming a successful breeding stallion whose other progeny included Exceller and Empery. Dahlia was the first foal of her dam, Charming Alibi, a durable racemare who won sixteen of her seventy-one races and earned over $110,000 in prize money. Perhaps the most notable of her later offspring was Canadian Bound, who was auctioned for a world record price of $1,500,000 in 1976. Her other descendants have included the Prix de l'Arc de Triomphe winner Rail Link.

== Racing record ==
=== 1972: two-year-old season ===
She raced on turf in Europe, and during her career, few could successfully compete with her over the grass. As a two-year-old, she won the Prix Yacowlef over 1000 metres at Deauville Racecourse on her racecourse debut. She finished fifth in her next two races before ending her campaign with a second place behind Begara in the Prix des Réservoirs over 1600 metres at Longchamp Racecourse.

=== 1973: three-year-old season ===
==== Spring ====
Dahlia began her second season in April in the Prix de la Grotte, a trial for the Poule d'Essai des Pouliches over 1600 metres at Longchamp, and won easily from Gay Style. In the Poule d'Essai des Pouliches she faced the leading French filly Allez France for the first time. She finished third of the eleven runners, beaten two and a half lengths and a neck by Allez France and Princess Arjumand. On 20 May Dahlia was moved up in distance when she faced Princess Arjumand again in the Prix Saint-Alary over 2000 metres at Longchamp: the favourite for the race however, was Virunga who was unbeaten in two races. Ridden as usual by Bill Pyers, and starting at 5.4/1, Dahlia overtook Virunga early in the straight and won by one and a half lengths, with Kashara taking third ahead of Princess Arjumand. In the Prix de Diane at Chantilly Racecourse on 10 June, Dahlia faced a rematch with Allez France, who had run poorly in the Prix Lupin. She again proved no match for her rival but finished four lengths clear of the other 23 runners, including Virunga.

==== Summer ====
On her next appearance, Dahlia was again moved up in distance when she was sent to Ireland for the Irish Oaks over one and a half miles at the Curragh on 21 July. The British filly Mysterious started odds on favourite after wins in the 1000 Guineas and The Oaks, whilst Dahlia was second choice on 8/1 alongside the Pretty Polly Stakes winner Hurry Harriet. Dahlia moved up to challenge Mysterious a quarter of a mile from the finish, overtook the favourite a furlong out and drew away to win easily by three lengths. A week after her win in Ireland, Dahlia took on older horses for the first time in Britain's most prestigious weight-for-age race, the King George VI and Queen Elizabeth Stakes at Ascot Racecourse. She started at odds of 10/1 in a twelve-runner field which included Roberto, Rheingold, Scottish Rifle, Hard To Beat (Prix du Jockey Club), Parnell (runner-up in the race in 1972 and winner of the Irish St Leger) and Weavers' Hall (Irish Derby). Dahlia was in tenth place on the inside entering the straight but then wove her way through the field to take the lead just inside the last quarter mile. She accelerated away from her male opponents in the closing stages and won by six lengths from Rheingold. Her margin of victory equaled that of Mill Reef in 1971 and the winning time of 2:30.43 was a record for the race. Timeform commented "seldom can a top-class, hotly-contested, weight-for-age race have been won as impressively".

==== Autumn ====
After a break of six weeks Dahlia returned in the Prix Niel at Longchamp on 9 September in which she was matched against the Grand Prix de Paris winner Tennyson. She beat Tennyson by half a length, despite being eased down by Pyers in the closing stages. Dahlia's third clash with Allez France in the Prix Vermeille saw her start a slight favourite ahead of her rival in a field which also included Virunga, Gay Style and Hurry Harriet. Allez France won while Dahlia finished the race lame in fifth place, having sustained an injury to her left hind leg. Despite struggling to recover from her injury she was allowed to run in the Prix de l'Arc de Triomphe on 7 October but never looked likely to win and finished sixteenth of the twenty-seven runners behind Rheingold.

For her final run of 1973, Dahlia was sent to the United States for the 22nd running of the Washington, D.C. International at Laurel Park Racecourse on 10 November. The other European challengers were Scottish Rifle, Hurry Harriet, Card King (fourth in the Arc) and Acacio d'Aguilar (Preis von Europa), whilst the "home team" comprised Tentam (the 7/10 favourite), Big Spruce and London Company. After being restrained towards the rear of the field until the straight, Dahlia produced a strong late run on the outside and took the lead in the final furlong. She drew away in the final strides to win by two and a quarter lengths from Big Spruce, with Scottish Rifle in third, becoming the first female horse to win the race. After the race Zilber was asked to compare Dahlia to the American champion Secretariat and said "She could beat Secretariat any day in any country. I would like to see a match race. I would even put up my money".

=== 1974: four-year-old season ===
==== Spring ====
Dahlia took time to reach her best form in 1974. She was well beaten by Allez France in her first two starts, finishing fourth in the Prix d'Harcourt on 15 April and fifth in the Prix Ganay three weeks later. In June she resumed her international campaign at Epsom Downs Racecourse for the Coronation Cup over one and a half miles. She looked unimpressive in the pre-race paddock as she had done in her previous race. She was given what was described by Timeform as a "preposterous task" by her jockey as she trailed the field by many lengths in the early stages before making progress in the straight and finishing third behind Buoy and Tennyson.

==== Summer ====
Yves Saint-Martin took over the ride when Dahlia started favourite for the Grand Prix de Saint-Cloud over 2500 metres on 7 July. In a change of tactics she was in the first two throughout the race and won by a neck from On My Way. Three weeks later the filly attempted to become the first horse to win the King George VI and Queen Elizabeth Stakes for a second time. Ridden by Lester Piggott, she started 15/8 favourite against nine opponents including Highclere, Snow Knight, Dankaro, Buoy, Card King, Orsa Maggiore (Oaks d'Italia) and Hippodamia (entered as a pacemaker for Dahlia). Piggott restrained the filly towards the rear as Hippodamia set a strong pace from Snow Knight and Buoy, before moving up to fourth on the final turn. She accelerated into the lead approaching the final furlong and won by two and a half lengths from Highclere. Timeform commented that she had "cantered home on the bit, without Piggot's having to move a muscle". Despite reports that she would spend the rest of the season in North America, Dahlia was back in England in August and started 8/15 favourite for the third edition of the Benson and Hedges Gold Cup over ten and a half furlongs at York Racecourse. Highclere and Snow Knight were again in the field along with Imperial Prince (runner-up in the Epsom and Irish Derbies), whilst Hippodamia was again there to set the pace. Dahlia, ridden again Piggott, had some difficulty obtaining a clear run in the straight before taking the lead a furlong and a half from the finish and winning by two and a half lengths from Imperial Prince with Snow Knight in third.

==== Autumn ====
On 15 September at Longchamp Dahlia started 3/10 favourite for the Prix du Prince d'Orange, a trial race for the Prix de l'Arc de Triomphe. After looking likely to win in the last 200 metres she was beaten into third place by On My Way and Toujours Pret in a photo-finish. The filly bypassed the Arc and ended her season with three races in North America, starting with the Man O' War Stakes at Belmont Park on 11 October. Maurice Zilber was very unhappy about the quarantine arrangements and felt that the filly came to the race in less than top condition. With Piggott suffering from an ear infection which meant he was unable to fly to the United States, Dahlia was ridden by Ron Turcotte and came from well off the pace on the final turn to win by two lengths from Crafty Khale, with London Company taking third ahead of Golden Don. Turcotte said "she did was she was supposed to do all by herself... I never touched her" whils London Company's jockey Eddie Maple commented "that filly just shot right by us". Dahlia was reunited with Piggott when she contested the Canadian International Stakes at Woodbine Racetrack on 27 October. She raced along the rails behind the leaders as Snow Knight set a strong pace before accelerating through a gap to take the lead in the straight. She held off a late challenge from Big Spruce to win by a length in a track record time of 2:40.00. The New York Times reported Piggott as having said "Even when we were in traffic on the backside, apparently hemmed on the rail by two horses, I felt I had no cause for concern. I knew Dahlia had lots to give, and I knew some of those horses up front were going to break up as we entered the straight".

On her final start of the season she started the 3/5 favourite in her attempt to repeat her 1973 success in the Washington, D.C.International. In a steadily run race she was forced to the outside on the final turn and entered the straight with six lengths to make up on the leaders. She made rapid progress but was unable to sustain her challenge and finished third behind Admetus and Desert Vixen. Piggott was strongly criticised in some sections of the American press, who felt that he had employed overexaggerated waiting tactics. He responded by saying: "They can't win all the time, they're not machines, you know".

=== 1975: five-year-old season ===
As in the previous year, Dahlia struggled to find her best form in the early part of the season. She finished last of six to Allez France in the Prix Ganay, ninth of fifteen in the Prix Jean de Chaudenay on 19 May, sixth behind Star Appeal in the Gran Premio di Milano. In July she met trouble in running and came home fifth behind Un Kopeck in the Grand Prix de Saint-Cloud. In her attempt to win a third King George VI and Queen Elizabeth Stakes, she produced her best effort up to that point in the season despite becoming agitated in the preliminaries and showing a reluctance to enter the starting stalls. Ridden by Piggott and starting at 6/1, she stayed on in the straight and finished third to Grundy and Bustino, ahead of On My Way, Card King, Ashmore and Star Appeal. Dahlia's attempt to repeat her 1974 win in the Benson and Hedges Gold Cup saw her start at odds of 7/2 behind the odds-on Grundy with the other runners being Card King, Star Appeal and the outsiders Jimsun and Meautry. Dahlia led from the start, and with Piggott winding up the pace from early in the straight she won easily from Card King and Star Appeal, with Grundy running poorly in fourth.

Dahlia's win at York proved to be her only success of 1975. In the Grand Prix de Deauville on 31 August she finished third behind Duke of Marmalade and L'Ensorceleur but was promoted to second when the winner was disqualified. She then finished a close third behind Kasteel and Ramirez when favourite for the Prix du Prince d'Orange on 21 September. In the Prix de l'Arc de Triomphe, her last race in Europe, she met Allez France for the sixth and final time. She stumbled early in the race and was unable to recover, finishing fifteenth of the 24 runners behind Star Appeal. In late autumn she was again sent to North America and ran twice, starting with a fourth place behind Snow Knight in the Canadian International, in which she was given a great deal of ground to make up in the closing stages by her jockey Sandy Hawley. She then contested her third Washington D C International but sustained an injury in the race and finished eighth of the nine runners behind her stablemate Nobiliary.

=== 1976: six-year-old season ===
Sent to race permanently in California in 1976, she was trained by Charlie Whittingham. Based at Hollywood Park Racetrack, she ran thirteen times, competing on both dirt and turf. In May she won an allowance race allowance at Hollywood and followed up by winning the Grade I Hollywood Invitational Handicap over 12 furlongs. She was only the second female winner (after Typecast) of this race since its inception 35 years earlier. Dahlia ended her racing career by finishing seventh in the Las Palmas Handicap at Santa Anita Park on 30 October.

== Achievement and honours ==
In all, Dahlia had 48 starts, for 15 wins and 3 seconds and 7 thirds, defeating Classic-winning colts, in England, Ireland, France, Canada and the United States for $1,489,105 in prize money.

In the Handicap Optional, a ranking of the best French-trained two-year-olds, she was rated ten pounds inferior to the top-rated Targowice and seven pounds behind the top filly Allez France. In 1972 the independent Timeform organisation gave her a rating of 132, level with Allez France and one pound behind the leading three-year-old colt Thatch. In the British Free Handicap she was rated the equal of Thatch with a rating of 140 pounds, making her the joint-best three-year-old of the season. Following a poll conducted by the Racehorse Association Dahlia was named British Horse of the Year for 1973, taking 29 of the 39 votes.

In 1974, Dahlia was again named British Horse of the Year, taking 32 of the 36 votes. The Eclipse Awards for 1974 saw her defeat male opposition to be voted American Champion Turf Horse. In the same year Timeform gave her a peak rating of 135, one pound behind their Horse of the Year Allez France. In the following year she was rated 128 by Timeform whilst the official French handicap rated her the third best older female behind Allez France and Comtesse de Loir. In the British handicap she was rated the second best older female behind Lianga.

In 1981, Dahlia was inducted into the American Horse Racing Hall of Fame. She was inducted into the Canadian Horse Racing Hall of Fame in 2016.

== Breeding record ==
At the end of the 1976 racing season, Dahlia was retired and went on to a top record as a broodmare, something uncommon among great racemares. In 1988, Hunt sold his racing operations, and Dahlia was purchased for $1.1 million by American owner/breeder Allen E. Paulson, who sent her to Diamond A Farm in Kentucky.

Bred to leading stallions, she produced 13 foals:

- Balcones, a bay colt, foaled in 1978, sired by Bold Forbes. Won one race.
- Decadrachm, chestnut colt, 1979, by What A Pleasure. Won six races.
- J.O. Dahlia, bay colt, 1980, by J.O. Tobin. Failed to win in seven races.
- Dahar, bay colt, 1981 by Lyphard, won seven races including the Prix Lupin, Century Handicap, San Marcos Handicap, San Gabriel Handicap, San Juan Capistrano Handicap, San Luis Rey Handicap.
- Rivlia, bay colt 1982, by Riverman, Won nine races including Prix de l'Esperance, Hollywood Invitational Turf Handicap, Carleton F. Burke Handicap, San Luis Rey Handicap.
- Begonia, bay filly, 1983, by Plugged Nickle. Failed to win in three races.
- Delegant, grey colt, 1984, by Grey Dawn. Won seven races including the San Juan Capistrano Handicap.
- Dahlia's Image, bay filly, 1985, by Lyphard. Failed to win in 17 races. Grand-dam of Rite of Passage.
- Wajd, bay filly, 1987, by Northern Dancer, Won four races including Prix Minerve, Grand Prix d'Evry: dam of St Leger winner Nedawi.
- Dahlia's Dreamer, chestnut filly, 1989, by Theatrical. won five races including Flower Bowl Invitational Stakes.
- Llandaff, chestnut colt, 1990, by Lyphard. Won five races including Jersey Derby and Lexington Stakes.
- Miss Dahlia, bay filly 1994, by Strawberry Road. Unraced. Dam of Capital Plan, winner of 5 races including Santa Barbara Handicap and Beverly Hills Handicap.
- Tani, chestnut filly, 1996, by Theatrical. Unraced.

She was pensioned in 1996 and remained Diamond A Farm until her death, at 31 years, in 2001. She was buried in the farm's horse cemetery. The farm's manager Ted Carr said "She was a grand mare with great presence and we were sad to see her go. But we were honoured to have been her caretakers for the last 13 years."

== Pedigree ==
Pedigree of Dahlia (USA), chestnut mare, 1970
Sire Vaguely Noble (IRE) 1965	Vienna (GB); 1957	Aureole	Hyperion
Sire Vaguely Noble (IRE) 1965	Vienna (GB); 1957	Aureole	Angelola
Sire Vaguely Noble (IRE) 1965	Vienna (GB); 1957	Turkish Blood	Turkhan
Sire Vaguely Noble (IRE) 1965	Vienna (GB); 1957	Turkish Blood	Rusk
Sire Vaguely Noble (IRE) 1965	Noble Lassie (GB); 1956	Nearco (ITY)	Pharos
Sire Vaguely Noble (IRE) 1965	Noble Lassie (GB); 1956	Nearco (ITY)	Nogara
Sire Vaguely Noble (IRE) 1965	Noble Lassie (GB); 1956	Belle Sauvage	Big Game
Sire Vaguely Noble (IRE) 1965	Noble Lassie (GB); 1956	Belle Sauvage	Tropical Sun
Dam Charming Alibi 1963	Honeys Alibi; 1952	Alibhai	Hyperion
Dam Charming Alibi 1963	Honeys Alibi; 1952	Alibhai	Teresina
Dam Charming Alibi 1963	Honeys Alibi; 1952	Honeymoon	Beau Pere
Dam Charming Alibi 1963	Honeys Alibi; 1952	Honeymoon	Panoramic
Dam Charming Alibi 1963	Adorada (ARG); 1947	Hierocles	Abjer
Dam Charming Alibi 1963	Adorada (ARG); 1947	Hierocles	Loika
Dam Charming Alibi 1963	Adorada (ARG); 1947	Gilded Wave	Gallant Fox
Dam Charming Alibi 1963	Adorada (ARG); 1947	Gilded Wave	Ondulation (Family: 13-c)

== See also ==
- List of leading Thoroughbred racehorses
