= Godiva (horse) =

British-bred Thoroughbred racehorse

- Sire: Hyperion
- Grandsire: Gainsborough
- Dam: Carpet Slipper
- Damsire: Phalaris
- Sex: Mare
- Foaled: 1937
- Country: United Kingdom
- Colour: Bay
- Breeder: Esmond Harmsworth
- Owner: Esmond Harmsworth
- Trainer: Willie Jarvis
- Record: 8: 6–0–1
- Earnings: £7,804

Major wins
- New 1000 Guineas (1940); New Oaks (1940)

Godiva (1937–1940) was a British Thoroughbred racehorse, best known for winning two Classics in 1940. The filly won six times from eight races in a racing career which lasted from 1939 until June 1940. After winning three times as a two-year-old she was unbeaten in 1940, winning the 1000 Guineas over one mile at Newmarket and a wartime substitute Oaks over one and a half miles at the same course a month later. Godiva died within five months of her final race. She has been described as one of the best British racemares of the 20th century.

== Background ==
Godiva was a bay mare bred by her owner Esmond Harmsworth who later became better known as Lord Rothermere. In 1938 Harmsworth sold off most of his bloodstock interests, but kept three horses, one of which was the yearling filly later named Godiva. One of the horses he sold was Godiva's pregnant dam Carpet Slipper. The foal being carried by Carpet Slipper was Windsor Slipper, the 1942 Irish Triple Crown winner. Godiva was from the second crop of foals sired by the 1933 Derby winner Hyperion, the first of whose six Sires' championships in 1940 was largely due to the filly's successes. As a grand-daughter of the broodmare Simon's Shoes, Godiva came from the same branch of Thoroughbred Family 5-h which later produced the notable stallions Sadler's Wells and Nureyev.

Godiva was sent into training with William Rose "Willie" Jarvis at his Egerton House stable in Newmarket, Suffolk. Godiva was a temperamental and difficult filly who often gave trouble at the starting gate, but she formed a strong bond with her teenage exercise rider Douglas Marks. When Jarvis's stable jockey John Crouch was killed in a flying accident in June 1939, it was decided that Marks would ride the filly in her races.

== Racing career ==
=== 1939: two-year-old season ===
Godiva was one of the best British two-year-olds of 1939, winning three of her five races. Her victories came in the Princess Royal Stakes at Kempton, the Bedford Stakes at Newmarket and the Stud Produce Stakes at Sandown Park. Her best performance, however, came in defeat when she was tried against colts in the Middle Park Stakes at Newmarket on 1 November. She started poorly but ran on strongly at the finish to take third place behind the French-trained colts Djebel and Tant Mieux. In the Free Handicap, a ranking of the year's best two-year-olds, she was given a weight of 127 pounds, three pounds below the top-rated filly Golden Penny.

=== 1940: three-year-old season ===
Godiva made her three-year-old debut in the 1000 Guineas at Newmarket. The outbreak of World War II led to strict restrictions on the sport. Many racecourses were closed, leading to important races being either abandoned or relocated. In 1940, the "New 1000 Guineas Stakes" was switched from its traditional home on Newmarket's Rowley Mile to the adjoining July Course. Godiva and the virtually unknown Marks started at odds of 10/1 in a field of eleven fillies, with Golden Penny, ridden by the champion jockey Gordon Richards being made odds on favourite. In the race, Godiva raced on the opposite side of the course from the main group and moved up to dispute the lead with Golden Penny two furlongs from the finish. Despite swishing her tail as she galloped (regarded as a sign of temperament), Godiva quickly went clear and won very easily by five lengths from Golden Penny, with Allure four lengths further back in third. Her time was more than two seconds faster than Djebel's winning time in the 2000 Guineas two days earlier. On her next appearance, Godiva was moved up in distance and beat Drawing Prize to win the Oaks Trial Plate over ten furlongs at Hurst Park.

With Epsom Downs Racecourse out of use, the Derby and Oaks of 1940 were scheduled to be run at Newbury Racecourse, but a late change of plan saw the races being switched to the Newmarket July Course. In the "New Oaks" on 13 June, Godiva was made 7/4 favourite against thirteen opponents. She behaved poorly before the race was left many lengths behind at the start. Marks steadily made up the ground until he drew level with the leaders three furlongs from the finish. Godiva moved into the lead and quickly went clear, travelling with such ease that Marks had time to turn in the saddle and shout "Come on!" to his more experienced rivals. Godiva won easing down by three lengths from Silverlace, with Valeraine four lengths back in third. For the second time she beat the colts on the clock: her winning time of 2:29.4 was 1.4 seconds faster than the time recorded by Pont l'Eveque in winning the New Derby over the same course and distance a day earlier. The win gave Marks a second Classic win on only his seventh ride of the year.

Prize money had been greatly reduced in 1940, and Godiva's wins in the 1000 Guineas and Oaks brought her owner only £5,544: Galatea had won a combined total of £15,935 for winning the same two races in 1939.

== Retirement and death ==
Racing was suspended in Britain during July and August 1940. Although there were hopes that Godiva would return for an autumn campaign, the filly was withdrawn from training and retired. She was sent to Ireland to begin a new career as a broodmare and was lodged at the Fort Union Stud in County Limerick. Shortly after her arrival she underwent an operation as a result of which she contracted septicaemia and died.

== Assessment and honours ==
In their book, A Century of Champions, based on the Timeform rating system, John Randall and Tony Morris rated Godiva a "great" winner of the 1000 Guineas and Oaks and the fifth best British-trained filly of the 20th century.

== Pedigree ==
Pedigree of Godiva (GB), bay mare, 1937
Sire Hyperion (GB) 1930	Gainsborough; 1915	Bayardo	Bay Ronald
Sire Hyperion (GB) 1930	Gainsborough; 1915	Bayardo	Galicia
Sire Hyperion (GB) 1930	Gainsborough; 1915	Rosedrop	St. Frusquin
Sire Hyperion (GB) 1930	Gainsborough; 1915	Rosedrop	Rosaline
Sire Hyperion (GB) 1930	Selene bay 1919	Chaucer	St. Simon
Sire Hyperion (GB) 1930	Selene bay 1919	Chaucer	Canterbury Pilgrim
Sire Hyperion (GB) 1930	Selene bay 1919	Serenissima	Minoru
Sire Hyperion (GB) 1930	Selene bay 1919	Serenissima	Gondolette
Dam Carpet Slipper (GB) 1930	Phalaris; 1913	Polymelus	Cyllene
Dam Carpet Slipper (GB) 1930	Phalaris; 1913	Polymelus	Maid Marian
Dam Carpet Slipper (GB) 1930	Phalaris; 1913	Bromus	Sainfoin
Dam Carpet Slipper (GB) 1930	Phalaris; 1913	Bromus	Cheery
Dam Carpet Slipper (GB) 1930	Simon's Shoes; 1914	Simon Square	St. Simon
Dam Carpet Slipper (GB) 1930	Simon's Shoes; 1914	Simon Square	Sweet Marjorie
Dam Carpet Slipper (GB) 1930	Simon's Shoes; 1914	Goody Two-Shoes	Isinglass
Dam Carpet Slipper (GB) 1930	Simon's Shoes; 1914	Goody Two-Shoes	Sandal (Family No. 5-h)

- Godiva was inbred 4 × 4 to St. Simon, meaning that the stallion appears twice in the fourth generation of her pedigree.
