= Maurice Zilber =

French thoroughbred horse trainer

Personal information
- Nationality: French
- Born: 2 September 1920 Cairo, Egypt
- Died: 21 December 2008 (aged 88)
- Occupation: Trainer

Horse racing career
- Sport: Horse racing
- Career wins: Not found

Major racing wins
- Prix du Cadran (1970); Prix de la Forêt (1971, 1979); United Nations Stakes (1972); Grand Critérium (1973, 1983, 1985); Irish Oaks (1973); King George VI and Queen Elizabeth Stakes (1973, 1974); Prix Marcel Boussac (1973, 1980); Washington, D.C. International Stakes (1973, 1975, 1976, 1980); Canadian International Championship Stakes (1974, 1976, 1977); Grand Prix de Saint-Cloud (1974); International Stakes (1974, 1975); Man o' War Stakes (1974); Prix Royal-Oak (1974); Sussex Stakes (1974); E. P. Taylor Stakes (1975, 1978, 1982); Prix Ganay (1978, 1981); Prix Lupin (1976, 1984); Yellow Ribbon Stakes (1978); Prix de l'Opéra (1979); Prix d'Astarté (1990) British Classic Race wins: Epsom Derby (1976); French Classic Race wins: Prix du Jockey Club (1976); Grand Prix de Paris (1978)

Significant horses
- Dahar, Dahlia, Empery, Estrapade, Exceller, Nobiliary, Trillion, Youth

Maurice Zilber (2 September 1920 – 21 December 2008) was a French thoroughbred horse trainer born and raised in Cairo, Egypt to a Turkish mother and a French-Hungarian father. He trained horses in Egypt from 1946 to 1962, and then moved to France where he worked for another 43 years.

Based at the Chantilly Racecourse in France, Maurice Zilber conditioned horses for some of the leading owners such as Serge Fradkoff, Daniel Wildenstein, Nelson Bunker Hunt and in later years, Prince Khalid Abdullah. His horses competed across Europe and in 1976 he accomplished the rare feat of training the winner of both the English Derby and the French Derby. Maurice Zilber also regularly brought horses to North America to compete in major grass races such as the Canadian International Championship Stakes at Woodbine Racetrack in Canada and the Washington, D.C. International Stakes at Laurel Park Racecourse in the United States. Zilber won the Canadian International a record-tying three times and the Washington, D.C. International, on a record four occasions. An October 20, 1991 Washington Post article referred to him as "the illustrious French trainer whose work has become legend in Maryland."

Maurice Zilber gained his most fame as the trainer for American owner/breeder Nelson Bunker Hunt with European-based horses such as U.S. Racing Hall of Famer inductees Exceller and Dahlia. In the United Kingdom, Zilber won back-to-back King George VI and Queen Elizabeth Stakes in 1973 and 1974 with Dahlia, back-to-back Benson and Hedges Gold Cups in 1974 and 1975, again with Dahlia, and the 1976 Epsom Derby with Empery. Two of Zilber's horses won Eclipse Awards for their performances in the United States. The first was Hunt's Youth who was voted the American Champion Male Turf Horse of 1976 and the second was Trillion, voted the 1979 American Champion Female Turf Horse.

Maurice Zilber retired from training in 2005 and died at age 88 from cancer.
