= Aurelius (horse) =

Irish-bred Thoroughbred racehorse

- Sire: Aureole
- Grandsire: Hyperion
- Dam: Niobe
- Damsire: Sir Gallahad
- Sex: Stallion
- Foaled: 1958
- Country: Ireland
- Colour: Bay
- Breeder: Tally Ho Stud
- Owner: Vera Lilley
- Trainer: Noel Murless; Ken Cundell
- Record: 12-6-4-0 (flat)

Major wins
- Craven Stakes (1961); King Edward VII Stakes (1961); St Leger Stakes (1961); Hardwicke Stakes (1962)

Awards
- Timeform rating 134

Aurelius (foaled 1958) was an Irish Thoroughbred racehorse and sire best known for winning the classic St Leger Stakes in 1961 and for becoming one of the few classic winners to compete in steeplechases. As a two-year-old he finished fourth in his only appearance but was one of the best colts in Britain in the following year, winning the Craven Stakes and the King Edward VII Stakes before taking the St Leger. He was even better in 1962 when he won the Hardwicke Stakes and was narrowly beaten in the King George VI and Queen Elizabeth Stakes. He was retired to stud but had serious fertility problems and later returned to the racecourse where he had a reasonably successful career in National Hunt racing.

== Background ==
Aurelius was a big bay horse with a broad white blaze and three white socks bred in Ireland by the Tally Ho Stud. As a yearling he was offered for sale and was bought for 5,000 guineas by Noel Murless acting on behalf of Vera Lilley. His relatively modest sale price was reportedly because his unusual size was thought to make him potentially difficult to train. Murless trained the colt at his Warren Place stables in Newmarket, Suffolk.

Aurelius was sired by Aureole who won the King George VI and Queen Elizabeth Stakes in the ownership of Queen Elizabeth II in 1954: Aureole's other successful progeny included St. Paddy, Provoke and the Prix de l'Arc de Triomphe winner Saint Crespin. Aurelius's dam was Niobe, an American mare bred by William Woodward Sr. who was bought and imported to Ireland on the advice of Cecil Boyd-Rochfort. Niobe's dam was a full-sister to the 1944 Oaks winner Hycilla. A feature of Aurelius' pedigree was his close inbreeding to Hyperion.

== Racing career ==
=== 1960: two-year-old season ===
Aurelius did not appear as a two-year-old until the autumn of 1960. In September he made his only appearance of the season when he finished fourth behind Beta in the Royal Lodge Stakes.

=== 1961: three-year-old season ===
Aurelius began his second season in the Craven Stakes over the Rowley Mile course at Newmarket Racecourse in April. Ridden by Lester Piggott he won the race at odds of 8/1. He did not contest the 2000 Guineas at the next Newmarket meeting, running instead in the Newmarket Stakes in which he finished second to The Axe. Aurelius was considered a likely contender for the Derby after Murless's more fancied runner Pinturischio was found to be doped and unable to run, but Aurelius was withdrawn shortly before the race leaving Piggott without a ride.

At Royal Ascot in June, Aurelius started a 20/1 outsider for the King Edward VII Stakes over one and a half miles. Ridden by Geoff Lewis he won by two lengths from Pinzon. In August he was sent to York Racecourse for the Great Voltigeur Stakes in which he finished second, three quarters of a length behind the winner Just Great.

On 9 September, Aurelius was one of thirteen three-year-olds to contest the 185th running of the St Leger Stakes over fourteen and a half furlongs at Doncaster Racecourse. Ridden by Piggott he started at odds of 9/2. He took the lead a furlong and a half from the finish and won by three quarters of a length from Bounteous with the favourite Dicta Drake in third.

=== 1962: four-year-old season ===
Aurelius was kept in training as a four-year-old and began by winning the Coombe Stakes at Sandown. He returned to Royal Ascot in June where he won the Hardwicke Stakes and then won the Atalanta Stakes at Sandown in July. Later that month he produced what was arguably his best performance when he finished second by three quarters of a length to the French-trained Match in the King George VI and Queen Elizabeth Stakes at Ascot. In what was expected to be his final race he finished unplaced behind Soltikoff in the Prix de l'Arc de Triomphe.

== Assessment ==
Aurelius was given a rating of 134 by the independent Timeform organisation in 1962, placing him equal with Hethersett and Arctic Storm as the equal second best horses in Europe one pound below the top-rated Match. In their book A Century of Champions, John Randall and Tony Morris rated Aurelius an "average" St Leger winner and the best British-trained racehorse of his generation.

== Later career ==
Aurelius was retired to stud but proved to be almost completely infertile. After two years of getting hardly any of his mares in foal he was gelded and returned to the racecourse for a career in National Hunt racing. In the 1965/1966 National Hunt season he showed some promise as a hurdler, finishing second in a division of the Gloucestershire Hurdle at the Cheltenham Festival and then returned to the flat to run second to the dual Ascot Gold Cup winner Fighting Charlie in the Henry II Stakes at Sandown. In March 1967, Aurelius produced his best performance over obstacles when he finished second to Saucy Kit in the Champion Hurdle although he was then disqualified for causing interference in the closing stages. In the following season he was tested in steeplechases and won at Sandown and Ascot but then became extremely temperamental and refused to race in his subsequent starts.

Aurelius was the first horse to ever win at Ascot Racecourse on the flat, over hurdles and in a steeplechase. The obstacle course at Ascot was opened in 1965.

== Pedigree ==
Pedigree of Aurelius (GB), bay horse, 1958
| Sire Aureole (GB) 1950 | Hyperion*; 1930 | Gainsborough* | Bayardo* |
| Sire Aureole (GB) 1950 | Hyperion*; 1930 | Gainsborough* | Rosedrop* |
| Sire Aureole (GB) 1950 | Hyperion*; 1930 | Selene* | Chaucer* |
| Sire Aureole (GB) 1950 | Hyperion*; 1930 | Selene* | Serenissima* |
| Sire Aureole (GB) 1950 | Angelola (GB); 1945 | Donatello | Blenheim |
| Sire Aureole (GB) 1950 | Angelola (GB); 1945 | Donatello | Delleana |
| Sire Aureole (GB) 1950 | Angelola (GB); 1945 | Feola | Friar Marcus |
| Sire Aureole (GB) 1950 | Angelola (GB); 1945 | Feola | Aloe |
| Dam Niobe (USA) 1948 | Sir Gallahad (FR); 1920 | Teddy | Ajax |
| Dam Niobe (USA) 1948 | Sir Gallahad (FR); 1920 | Teddy | Rondeau |
| Dam Niobe (USA) 1948 | Sir Gallahad (FR); 1920 | Plucky Liege | Spearmint |
| Dam Niobe (USA) 1948 | Sir Gallahad (FR); 1920 | Plucky Liege | Concertina |
| Dam Niobe (USA) 1948 | Humility (GB); 1938 | Hyperion* | Gainsborough* |
| Dam Niobe (USA) 1948 | Humility (GB); 1938 | Hyperion* | Selene* |
| Dam Niobe (USA) 1948 | Humility (GB); 1938 | Priscilla Carter | Omar Khayyam |
| Dam Niobe (USA) 1948 | Humility (GB); 1938 | Priscilla Carter | The Reef (Family 2-n) |

* Aurelius is inbred 2S x 3D to the stallion Hyperion, meaning that he appears second generation on the sire side of his pedigree, and third generation on the dam side of his pedigree.
