= Hyperion (horse) =

British-bred Thoroughbred racehorse

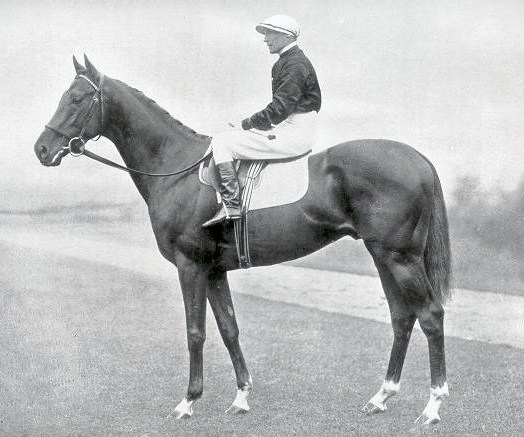
- Sire: Gainsborough
- Grandsire: Bayardo
- Dam: Selene
- Damsire: Chaucer
- Sex: Stallion
- Foaled: 18 April 1930
- Died: 9 December 1960 (aged 30)
- Country: United Kingdom
- Colour: Chestnut
- Breeder: Edward Stanley, 17th Earl of Derby
- Owner: Edward Stanley, 17th Earl of Derby
- Trainer: George Lambton
- Record: 13: 9–1–2
- Earnings: £29,509

Major wins
- New Stakes (1932); Dewhurst Stakes (1932); Prince of Wales's Stakes (1933); Chester Vase (1933); Epsom Derby (1933); St Leger Stakes (1933)

Awards
- Leading Sire in GB & Ireland (1940, 1941, 1942, 1945, 1946, 1954); Leading Broodmare Sire in Britain & Ireland (1948, 1957, 1967, 1968)
- Last updated on 1 September 2022

Hyperion (18 April 1930 – 9 December 1960) was a British-bred Thoroughbred racehorse, a dual classic winner, an outstanding sire, and considered to be one of the most important Thoroughbreds of the 20th century.

Owned by Edward Stanley, 17th Earl of Derby, Hyperion won GBP £29,509 during his racing career—a considerable sum at the time. His victories included the Epsom Derby and the St. Leger Stakes. He was the most successful British-bred sire of the 20th century and the champion sire in the UK six times between 1940 and 1954.

== History ==
Hyperion was born on 18 April 1930. His thoroughbred sire was Gainsborough, who was one of three wartime Triple Crown winners in the United Kingdom. His dam was Selene, her sire was Chaucer, the son of St. Simon. Selene was the dam of sires such as Sickle (GB) (sireline ancestor of Native Dancer and Sea Bird), Pharamond (US), and Hunter's Moon (GB). Hyperion was linebred 3x4 to St. Simon.

The colt was bred and owned by Edward Stanley, 17th Earl of Derby, who hired George Lambton to train him.

According to writer Avalyn Hunter on Hyperion's conformation: "[Hyperion was a] muscular, powerfully built chestnut horse...he was short-legged and long-bodied for his height [15.1 hands (61 inches, 155 cm)], and somewhat ewe-necked and straight-shouldered, but had excellent action. He was light-boned below the knee. Although he had a distinct personality, and could have a mind of his own, he had a calm disposition. He was a thoroughly lazy horse at work, which was unfortunate as he needed a good deal of training to get into top condition, but was a determined performer on the race course."

== Racing career ==
As 2-year-old, in 1932, Hyperion won the New Stakes at Ascot and the Dewhurst Stakes, plus a dead-heat in the Prince of Wales Stakes, from five starts in 1932. He was undefeated in four starts. In 1933, as a 3-year-old, Hyperion went on to win the Chester Vase, the Epsom Derby, the Prince of Wales Stakes, and the St. Leger Stakes.

He raced four times at the age of 4, winning two races, the March Stakes (ten furlongs) and the Burwell Stakes (showcase handicap), both contested at Newmarket. In his main race, the Ascot Gold Cup, he placed third, after Felicitation and Thor. The 2.5 mile race indicated that he was not a true stayer. In the Dullingham Stakes at Newmarket, only two horses started where the 3-year-old, Caithness, carrying 8 st. 1 lb. defeated Hyperion carrying 10 st. 2 lb. by a short head.

== Stud record ==
He was retired to stud when he was 5 years old. He was a highly successful sire until his death on 9 December 1960, at the age of 30.

An important stallion, he sired the winners of 752 races, including 53 stakes winners that had 84 stakes wins, and was the leading sire in Great Britain & Ireland for six times, counting amongst his progeny:

- Aureole (GB) H, 1950 — Coronation Cup (1954), King George VI and Queen Elizabeth Stakes (1954)
- Godiva (GB) M, 1937 — 1,000 Guineas (1940), New Oaks Stakes (1940)
- Gulf Stream (GB) H, 1943 — Gimcrack Stakes (1945), Eclipse Stakes (1946)
- Hypericum (GB) M, 1943 — Dewhurst Stakes (1945), 1,000 Guineas (1946)
- Owen Tudor (GB) H, 1938 — Epsom Derby (1941), Ascot Gold Cup (1942)
- Pensive (US) H, 1941 — Kentucky Derby (1944), Preakness Stakes (1944)
- Sun Castle (GB) H, 1938 — St Leger Stakes (1941)
- Sun Chariot (IRE) M, 1939 — 1,000 Guineas (1942), Epsom Oaks (1942), St Leger Stakes (1942)
- Sun Stream (GB) M, 1942 — 1,000 Guineas (1945), Epsom Oaks (1945)
- Heliopolis (GB) H, 1936 — was sold to an American breeder for whom he stood in Kentucky and was the leading sire in North America twice in 1950 and 1954.

Hyperion's daughters foaled the winners of 1,196 races and GBP £1,131,346. He was also the damsire of Nearctic, who in turn sired Northern Dancer, the 20th century's greatest sire. He is also the damsire of Citation, one of the greatest American champions.

In Australia and New Zealand, Hyperion's descendants have exerted a profound influence on the racing and breeding industry. This influence was introduced via Hyperion's foreign based sons and also by his imported sons, Empyrean [(GB) H, 1944], Helios [(GB) H, 1937], High Peak [(GB) H, 1942], Red Mars [(GB) H, 1941], and Ruthless [(GB) H, 1941], as well as paternal grandsons such as "Star King" (by Stardust (GB) H, 1937) later known as the outstanding sire, Star Kingdom.

Lord Derby commissioned equine artist Martin Stainforth to paint a portrait of Hyperion.

A lifesize statue modelled by John Skeaping in bronze of Hyperion stands at the front of the Jockey Club headquarters on Newmarket High Street. From 2009, his skeleton has been exhibited at the National Horseracing Museum (also in Newmarket), lent by the Animal Health Trust to replace the skeleton of Eclipse.

When Hyperion died, Lord Derby and associates toasted him from a bottle of cognac that had been opened in honor of Winston Churchill, and drank to "The two greatest Grand Old Men of our time."

== Sire line tree ==
Descendants of Hyperion (click to show)
- Hyperion
  - Half Crown
    - Haffaday
  - Admiral's Walk
  - Casanova
    - Golden Surprise
      - Cornishman
  - Heliopolis
    - Marine Victory
    - Ace Admiral
      - Ace Marine
      - Inside Tract
      - Frosty Admiral
    - Olympia
      - Decathlon
        - Western Warrior
      - Air Pilot
      - Greek Game
      - Lucky Mel
      - Alhambra
      - Talent Show
      - Winonly
      - Editorialist
      - Pia Star
        - Poley
      - Creme dela Creme
        - Cafe Prince
        - Rich Cream
      - Top Bid
    - Greek Ship
    - Greek Song
      - Greek Money
    - Charlie McAdam
      - Dhaulagiri
        - Dhaudevi
    - Helioscope
    - High Gun
    - Summer Tan
      - Sunrise County
    - Rose Trellis
    - Grey Eagle
      - Little Bit
    - Globemaster
  - His Highness
    - Perhapsburg
      - Lucius
  - Hypnotist
  - Quick Ray
  - Helios
    - Wodalla
  - Hippius
  - Stardust
    - Stalino
      - Three Cheers
        - Great Ovation
    - Bright News
      - Casmiri
        - Ben Nevis
    - Star Kingdom
      - Kingster
      - Star Realm
      - Gold Stakes
      - Todman
        - Cambaman
        - Eskimo Prince
        - Prince Of Baden
        - Joking
        - Crewman
        - Ricochet
        - Beaches
        - New Gleam
        - Blazing Saddles
        - Bootee
        - Imposing
      - Mighty Kingdom
      - Skyline
        - Sky Sailor
      - Fine and Dandy
      - Noholme
        - Nodouble
        - Shecky Greene
        - Brigand
        - General Holme
        - Fools Holme
      - Royal Artist
      - Secret Kingdom
      - Sky High
        - Captain Kirk
        - Skyperion
        - Autobiography
        - Sky Cast's Double
        - Sky High's Son
        - Take Off
      - Columbia Star
      - Shifnal
        - Sun Monarch
      - Sunset Hue
        - Gunsynd
      - Time And Tide
      - Faringdon
        - Navajo Brave
        - Sabron
      - Star Of Heaven
        - Star Shower
      - King Star
      - Star Affair
      - Biscay
        - Bletchingly
        - Zephyr Bay
        - Marscay
      - Kaoru Star
        - Luskin Star
        - Full On Aces
        - Old Spice
      - Rajah
      - Coalcliff
      - Osmunda
      - Planet Kingdom
        - Just Ideal
        - Ming Dynasty
        - Mighty Kingdom
        - Cosmic Planet
        - Ideal Planet
        - Our Planet
        - Leica Planet
      - Red God
        - Pacifica
      - Tattenham
    - Gala Performance
      - Gala Crest
        - Gala Supreme
  - Alibhai
    - Cover Up
    - On Trust
      - Trackmaster
    - Solidarity
    - Your Host
      - Blen Host
      - Social Climber
      - Kelso
      - Windy Sands
        - Crystal Water
    - My Host
    - Chevation
    - Determine
      - Warfare
        - Assagai
      - Decidedly
        - Tinajero
        - Wardlaw
      - Donut King
    - Bardstown
    - Honeys Alibi
    - Traffic Judge
      - Green Ticket
      - Delta Judge
      - Traffic
        - Rheffic
      - Traffic Bridge
        - Branch County
      - Court Recess
      - Traffic Mark
      - Judgeable
      - Rest Your Case
      - Traffic Cop
        - Deputed Testamony
      - Court Ruling
    - Sharpsburg
    - Oligarchy
    - Mr Consistency
  - Devonian
    - Herring Gull
  - Orthodox
  - Owen Tudor
    - Tudor Minstrel
      - Buckhound
        - Royal Buck
      - King Of The Tudors
        - Henry The Seventh
        - Crocket
        - Golden Ruler
      - Poona
      - Will Somers
        - Balidar
        - Pentotal
      - Sallymount
      - Tomy Lee
        - Jeep Driver
      - Tudor Melody
        - Kashmir
        - Tudor Music
        - Welsh Pageant
        - Tarim
      - Sing Sing
        - Celtic Song
        - Manacle
        - Jukebox
        - Song
        - Mummy's Pet
        - Singing Bede
        - African Sky
        - Saulingo
        - Averof
    - Abernant
      - Thin Ice
      - Aberli
      - Welsh Rake
      - Abgar
        - Carlsberg
      - Zahedan
    - Eplenor
    - Tudor Era
    - Right Royal
      - Salvo
      - Ruysdael
      - Rangong
        - Hyperno
        - Ring the Bell
      - In The Purple
        - Gold and Black
      - Prince Regent
      - Politico
        - Party Politics
      - Kambalda
        - Miinnehoma
      - Irish
  - Selim Hassan
    - Cid
    - Chispeado
    - Yatasto
      - Yata Nahuel
  - Sol Oriens
  - Sun Castle
  - Hyacinthus
  - Hyperides
  - Sun King
    - Sundew
  - Deimos
  - Coastal Traffic
    - Buisson d'Or
      - Pot d'Or
  - Pensive
    - Ponder
      - Needles
    - Theory
    - Cyclotron
      - Barnaby's Bluff
  - Red Mars
  - Rockafella
    - Rockavon
  - Ruthless
  - Greek Star
    - Anglo
  - High Peak
  - Aldis Lamp
  - Gulf Stream
    - Manganga
    - Gulf Weed
    - Pipote
    - Anisado
    - Manantial
    - Mamboreta
    - Montparnasse
    - Riesgo
  - Khaled
    - Dulac
    - Big Noise
    - Correspondent
      - Sherluck
        - Dot Ed's Bluesky
    - El Drag
    - Hillary
    - Swaps
      - Chateaugay
        - True Knight
        - Hokuto Flag
      - No Robbery
        - Wind and Wuthering
      - Eurasian
      - Laramie Trail
        - Librado
        - Lupin
        - Pitador
        - Prodigo
        - Lin Yutang
    - Terrang
      - Terlago
    - California Kid
    - Khalex
      - Albany
    - Linmold
    - New Policy
      - Reb's Policy
        - Town Policy
    - Physician
    - Going Abroad
    - Corn Off The Cob
  - Radiotherapy
  - Sky High
    - Pas de Quatre
      - Huron
  - Empyrean
  - Hyperbole
  - Babu's Pet
  - Rolled Gold
  - Aristophanes
    - Atlas
    - Booz
    - Forli
      - Home Guard
        - Luigi
      - Forego
      - Thatch
        - Thatching
        - Final Straw
        - Stifelius
        - Achieved
        - Tanque Verde
        - Tommy Way
        - Shulich
      - Forceten
      - Intrepid Hero
      - Fordham
      - Formidable
        - Forzando
        - Efisio
        - Chilibang
      - Key To Content
      - Posse
        - Altayan
        - Sheriff's Star
        - Linpac West
      - Sadeem
    - Dorileo
    - Frari
  - Hylander
  - Judicate
  - Aureole
    - St Crespin
      - St Columbus
        - Maori Venture
      - Whispin
    - St Paddy
      - St Puckle
        - What A Nuisance
      - Connaught
        - Sir Montagu
        - Connaught Ranger
        - Centurion
        - Remainderman
        - Dukedom
        - Playboy Jubilee
        - Buffavento
        - Lirung
      - Jupiter Island
        - Mr Cool
    - Vienna
      - Vaguely Noble
        - Ace of Aces
        - Noble Decree
        - Noble Bijou
        - Empery
        - Exceller
        - Sporting Yankee
        - Gay Mecene
        - Inkerman
        - Lemhi Gold
        - El Cuite
    - Aurelius
    - Miralgo
      - Roll Of Honour
    - Silver Cloud
      - Silver Buck
    - Provoke
    - Hermes
      - Van der Hum
  - Gun Shot
    - Gun Bow
  - High Veldt
  - Hornbeam
    - Claude
      - Cerreto
    - Intermezzo
      - Green Grass
  - Ommeyad
  - High Hat
    - High Line
  - Zenith

== Pedigree ==
Pedigree of Hyperion (GB), chestnut stallion, 1930
Sire Gainsborough Bay 1915	Bayardo; Bay 1906	Bay Ronald	Hampton
Sire Gainsborough Bay 1915	Bayardo; Bay 1906	Bay Ronald	Black Duchess
Sire Gainsborough Bay 1915	Bayardo; Bay 1906	Galicia	Galopin*
Sire Gainsborough Bay 1915	Bayardo; Bay 1906	Galicia	Isoletta
Sire Gainsborough Bay 1915	Rosedrop; Br. 1907	St Frusquin	St Simon*
Sire Gainsborough Bay 1915	Rosedrop; Br. 1907	St Frusquin	Isabel
Sire Gainsborough Bay 1915	Rosedrop; Br. 1907	Rosaline	Trenton (NZ)
Sire Gainsborough Bay 1915	Rosedrop; Br. 1907	Rosaline	Rosalys
Dam Selene Bay 1919	Chaucer; Brown 1900	St Simon*	Galopin*
Dam Selene Bay 1919	Chaucer; Brown 1900	St Simon*	St Angela*
Dam Selene Bay 1919	Chaucer; Brown 1900	Canterbury Pilgrim	Tristan
Dam Selene Bay 1919	Chaucer; Brown 1900	Canterbury Pilgrim	Pilgrimage*
Dam Selene Bay 1919	Serenissima; Bay 1913	Minoru	Cyllene
Dam Selene Bay 1919	Serenissima; Bay 1913	Minoru	Mother Siegel
Dam Selene Bay 1919	Serenissima; Bay 1913	Gondolette	Loved One*
Dam Selene Bay 1919	Serenissima; Bay 1913	Gondolette	Donogola (Family No. 6)

* Hyperion is inbred 4S x 3D to the stallion St Simon, meaning that he appears fourth generation on the sire side of his pedigree, and third generation on the dam side of his pedigree.

* Hyperion is inbred 4S x 5S x 4D to the stallion Galopin, meaning that he appears fourth generation and fifth generation (via St Simon) on the sire side of his pedigree, and fourth generation on the dam side of his pedigree.

* Hyperion is inbred 4D x 5D to the mare Pilgrimage, meaning that she appears fourth generation and fifth generation (via Loved One) on the dam side of his pedigree.

== See also ==
- List of racehorses
