= Provoke (horse) =

British Thoroughbred racehorse

- Sire: Aureole
- Grandsire: Hyperion
- Dam: Tantalizer
- Damsire: Tantieme
- Sex: Stallion
- Foaled: 1962
- Country: United Kingdom
- Colour: Bay
- Breeder: Jakie Astor
- Owner: Jakie Astor
- Trainer: Dick Hern
- Record: 7:4-1-0

Major wins
- Melrose Handicap (1965); St. Leger Stakes (1965)
- Last updated on July 26, 2008

Provoke (foaled 1962) was a British Thoroughbred racehorse and sire. In a career which lasted from autumn 1964 until September 1965, he ran seven times and won four races. He won the Classic St Leger as a three-year-old in 1965, defeating Meadow Court by ten lengths. He was later exported to stand as a stallion in the Soviet Union.

== Background ==
Provoke was a bay horse with a narrow white blaze and white socks on his hind feet, bred and owned by Jakie Astor. He was sired by the King George VI and Queen Elizabeth Stakes winner Aureole. His dam, Tantalizer was a good racemare who was placed in the Irish Oaks and the Ribblesdale Stakes and was a half-sister of the outstanding stayer Trelawny. As a descendant of the mare Popinjay, Provoke was a member of the same branch of Thoroughbred family 1-n which produced Swale and Shadeed.

Astor sent the colt into training with Dick Hern at stables in West Ilsley in Berkshire.

== Racing career ==
=== 1964: two-year-old season ===
Provoke was slow to mature and was not highly tried as a two-year-old. He made his only racecourse appearance in late October, when he finished unplaced in the Theale Plate at Newbury Racecourse.

=== 1965: three-year-old season ===
Provoke began the 1965 season by finishing fourth in the Glasgow Maiden Stakes at York Racecourse in early May and then finished second in the Shaw Maiden Plate at Newbury later in the month. He was never beaten again. In June, Provoke recorded his first win when taking the Childrey Maiden Stakes over thirteen furlongs at Newbury. He then won the Cranbourn Chase Stakes at Ascot in July and the Melrose Stakes at York in August.

In September, Provoke was sent to Doncaster to contest the St Leger. Provoke was ridden by Joe Mercer and started as a 28/1 outsider in a field of eleven runners. Meadow Court, the winner of the King George VI and Queen Elizabeth Stakes started 4/11 favourite in a race which was run on extremely soft ground. Provoke was well-suited and by the muddy conditions and after taking the lead three furlongs from the finish he pulled clear of the opposition to win by ten lengths. Meadow Court's connections offered no excuses apart from the state of the ground, which was described as the worst for 39 years. The result was described as "one of the biggest upsets in British horse racing history".

Provoke remained in training in 1966, but was afflicted by a viral infection and did not run.

== Assessment ==
Provoke was given a rating of 130 by Timeform in 1965.

In their book A Century of Champions, John Randall and Tony Morris rated Provoke an "average" St Leger winner.

== Stud career ==
In 1966 Provoke was sold and exported to the Soviet Union. He died shortly after his arrival in Russia.

== Pedigree ==
Pedigree of Provoke (GB), bay stallion, 1962
Sire Aureole (GB)	Hyperion	Gainsborough*	Bayardo*
Sire Aureole (GB)	Hyperion	Gainsborough*	Rosedrop*
Sire Aureole (GB)	Hyperion	Selene	Chaucer
Sire Aureole (GB)	Hyperion	Selene	Serenissima
Sire Aureole (GB)	Angelola	Donatello	Blenheim*
Sire Aureole (GB)	Angelola	Donatello	Delleana
Sire Aureole (GB)	Angelola	Feola	Friar Marcus
Sire Aureole (GB)	Angelola	Feola	Aloe
Dam Tantalizer (GB)	Tantieme	Deux-Pour-Cent	Deiri
Dam Tantalizer (GB)	Tantieme	Deux-Pour-Cent	Dix Pour Cent
Dam Tantalizer (GB)	Tantieme	Turka	Indus
Dam Tantalizer (GB)	Tantieme	Turka	La Furka*
Dam Tantalizer (GB)	Indian Night	Umidwar	Blandford*
Dam Tantalizer (GB)	Indian Night	Umidwar	Uganda
Dam Tantalizer (GB)	Indian Night	Fairly Hot	Solario*
Dam Tantalizer (GB)	Indian Night	Fairly Hot	Fair Cop (Family 1-n)

* Provoke is inbred 3S x 5D to the stallion Gainsborough, meaning that he appears third generation on the sire side of his pedigree, and fifth generation (via Solario) on the dam side of his pedigree.

* Provoke is inbred 5S x 5D x 4D to the stallion Blandford, meaning that he appears fifth generation (via Blenheim) on the sire side of his pedigree, and fifth generation (via La Furka) and fourth generation on the dam side of his pedigree.
