= Aureole (horse) =

British-bred Thoroughbred racehorse

- Sire: Hyperion
- Grandsire: Gainsborough
- Dam: Angelola
- Damsire: Donatello
- Sex: Stallion
- Foaled: 1950
- Country: United Kingdom
- Colour: Chestnut
- Breeder: King George VI
- Owner: Queen Elizabeth II
- Trainer: Cecil Boyd-Rochfort
- Record: 14:7-3-2
- Earnings: £36,224

Major wins
- Lingfield Derby Trial (1953); Cumberland Lodge Stakes (1953); Victor Wild Stakes (1954); Coronation Cup (1954); Hardwicke Stakes (1954); King George VI and Queen Elizabeth Stakes (1954)

Awards
- Timeform rating: 132
- Last updated on 13 May 2022

Aureole (1950–1974) was a British Thoroughbred racehorse and sire who was owned by Elizabeth II. In a career that lasted from August 1952 until July 1954, he ran fourteen times and won eleven races. As a three-year-old in 1953, he won the Lingfield Derby Trial before finishing second to Pinza in both the Derby and the King George VI and Queen Elizabeth Stakes. He reached his peak as a four-year-old in 1954 when he won his last four races: the Victor Wild Stakes at Kempton, the Coronation Cup at Epsom, the Hardwicke Stakes at Royal Ascot and Britain's most prestigious all-aged race, the King George VI and Queen Elizabeth Stakes. After retiring from racing he was sent to stud, where he became a successful sire of winners.

== Background ==
Aureole was a bright chestnut horse with a white blaze and three white socks, bred by King George VI. When the King died in 1952, the ownership of the unraced two-year-old colt passed to his daughter, Queen Elizabeth II. Aureole was sired by Hyperion who won the Derby and the St Leger in 1933 before becoming a highly successful breeding stallion. He was Leading sire in Great Britain and Ireland on six occasions. Aureole's dam, Angelola, finished second in The Oaks and came from the same branch of Thoroughbred Family 2-f which produced Round Table, Highclere and Pebbles.

Aureole was sent into training with Cecil Boyd-Rochfort at Freemason Lodge Stables at Newmarket, Suffolk. In training, the colt was temperamental and excitable: Boyd-Rochfort, however, reportedly welcomed these attributes as he believed that the best of Hyperion's offspring tended to be difficult and high-spirited characters.

== Racing career ==
=== 1952: two-year-old season ===
Aureole made his first appearance at York Racecourse in August. He delayed the start by "playing up", but won comfortably. He was then off the course for two months before running in October at Newmarket here he contested the Middle Park Stakes, one of the year's most important two-year-old races. He finished sixth behind Nearula, a colt who went on to win the 1953 2000 Guineas.

=== 1953: three-year-old season ===
Aureole began his three-year-old season in the 2000 Guineas, in which he finished strongly to take fifth place behind Nearula. He was then moved up in distance for the Lingfield Derby Trial over one and a half miles. He won easily to establish himself as a leading contender for the Epsom Derby.

In the week of his owner's coronation Aureole started at odds of 9/1 for the Derby, with Pinza and Premonition being made 5/1 joint-favourites in a field of twenty-seven runners. Aureole became highly agitated before the race, but ran well to finish second, four lengths behind Pinza. He developed a slight cough after the Derby and ran disappointingly in the Eclipse Stakes at Sandown, finishing third to the French challenger Artur. In late July at Ascot he was again matched against Pinza in the King George VI and Queen Elizabeth Stakes, a race named after his owner's parents. He finished second again, this time beaten three lengths. Later in the summer, he was treated by a neurologist in an attempt to improve his temperament.

In the St Leger at Doncaster in September, Aureole was made 6/4 favourite ahead of the Grand Prix de Paris winner Northern Light. Both the Queen and Sir Winston Churchill were in attendance on a fine autumn day which attracted a crowd of 250,000 to the Yorkshire course. Aureole again became agitated in the preliminaries and refused to settle in the race, fighting the attempts of his jockey Harry Carr to restrain him. He challenged for the lead in the straight but faded to finish third behind his stable companion Premonition, beaten six lengths. He ended the season with a win in the Cumberland Lodge Stakes at Ascot, where he was ridden by Eph Smith, as Carr was unable to make the weight. Smith got along so well with the colt that he replaced Carr as Aureole's regular jockey.

=== 1954: four-year-old season ===
Aureole made his first appearance of 1954 in the Coronation Stakes over ten furlongs at Sandown in April. The race was extremely rough and Aureole, the 4/5 favourite, appeared to be an unlucky loser as he finished second to the Irish Derby winner Chamier. He then returned to one and a half miles to win the Victor Wild Stakes at Kempton.

At the Epsom Derby meeting, Aureole recorded his most important win up to that time as he won the Coronation Cup by five lengths from Chatsworth, with Nearula in third. After the race, Boyd-Rochfort professed himself to be "delighted" by the performance. Aureole was then sent to Royal Ascot to contest the Hardwicke Stakes. Smith struggled to obtain a clear run until the closing stages, and Aureole was a narrow winner from the French colt Janitor. Aureole returned to Ascot in July for the fourth running of the King George VI and Queen Elizabeth Stakes for which he was made 9/2 favourite against sixteen opponents. Aureole's behaviour before the race was as bad as ever and he unseated Smith on the way to the start. In the race he started slowly but recovered well, took the lead entering the straight, and won by three-quarters of a length from Vamos, with the 2000 Guineas winner Darius in third. After the win, described as "one of the most popular victories in British turf history" the Queen was heard to remark "wasn't it a wonderful performance, I hope all Sandringham are on it". As part of the victory celebration, the Queen sent a crate of champagne to the Press tent.

Aureole did not race again and was retired to stud. His season's winnings of £30,092 enabled the Queen to be the leading owner in Britain in 1954.

== Assessment ==
Aureole was given a rating of 132 by Timeform in 1954, making him the highest-rated older horse in Europe.

== Stud career ==
Aureole proved to be a highly successful stallion, being Champion sire in 1960 and 1961. His progeny included St. Paddy (Epsom Derby), Saint Crespin III (Prix de l'Arc de Triomphe), Aurelius (St Leger), Provoke (St Leger) and Vienna, the sire of Vaguely Noble.

== Sire line tree ==
- Aureole
  - St Crespin
    - St Columbus
      - Maori Venture
    - Whispin
  - St Paddy
    - St Puckle
      - What A Nuisance
    - Connaught
      - Sir Montagu
      - Connaught Ranger
      - Centurion
      - Remainderman
        - One Man
      - Dukedom
      - Playboy Jubilee
      - Buffavento
      - Lirung
    - Jupiter Island
      - Mr Cool
  - Vienna
    - Vaguely Noble
      - Ace of Aces
        - Jacksboro
      - Noble Decree
      - Noble Bijou
        - Allez Bijou
        - Prince Majestic
        - Alibhai
        - Lomondy
        - Be Noble
        - The Phantom
        - The Phantom Chance
      - Empery
        - Barbery
        - Blue Finn
      - Exceller
      - Sporting Yankee
      - Gay Mecene
        - Gay Minstrel
        - Long Mick
        - Noblequest
      - Inkerman
      - Lemhi Gold
      - El Cuite
  - Aurelius
  - Miralgo
    - Roll Of Honour
  - Silver Cloud
    - Silver Buck
  - Provoke
  - Hermes
    - Van der Hum

== Pedigree ==
Pedigree of Aureole (GB), chestnut stallion, 1950
Sire Hyperion chestnut 1930	Gainsborough bay 1915	Bayardo	Bay Ronald
Sire Hyperion chestnut 1930	Gainsborough bay 1915	Bayardo	Galicia
Sire Hyperion chestnut 1930	Gainsborough bay 1915	Rosedrop	St Frusquin*
Sire Hyperion chestnut 1930	Gainsborough bay 1915	Rosedrop	Rosaline
Sire Hyperion chestnut 1930	Selene bay 1919	Chaucer	St Simon*
Sire Hyperion chestnut 1930	Selene bay 1919	Chaucer	Canterbury Pilgrim
Sire Hyperion chestnut 1930	Selene bay 1919	Serenissima	Minoru
Sire Hyperion chestnut 1930	Selene bay 1919	Serenissima	Gondolette
Dam Angelola bay 1945	Donatello chestnut 1934	Blenheim	Blandford
Dam Angelola bay 1945	Donatello chestnut 1934	Blenheim	Malva
Dam Angelola bay 1945	Donatello chestnut 1934	Delleana	Clarissimus
Dam Angelola bay 1945	Donatello chestnut 1934	Delleana	Duccia di Buoninsegna
Dam Angelola bay 1945	Feola brown 1933	Friar Marcus	Cicero
Dam Angelola bay 1945	Feola brown 1933	Friar Marcus	Prim Nun
Dam Angelola bay 1945	Feola brown 1933	Aloe	Son-in-Law
Dam Angelola bay 1945	Feola brown 1933	Aloe	Alope (Family No. 2-f)

* Aureole is inbred 5S x 4S to the stallion St Simon, meaning that he appears fifth generation (via St Frusquin) and fourth generation on the sire side of his pedigree.
