= Empery =

American-bred Thoroughbred racehorse

- Racing silks of Nelson Bunker Hunt
- Sire: Vaguely Noble
- Grandsire: Vienna
- Dam: Pamplona
- Damsire: Postin
- Sex: Stallion
- Foaled: 1973
- Country: United States
- Colour: Bay
- Breeder: Nelson Bunker Hunt
- Owner: Nelson Bunker Hunt
- Trainer: Maurice Zilber
- Record: 8: 2-2-1

Major wins
- Epsom Derby (1976)

Awards
- Timeform rating 128

Empery (foaled 1973 in Kentucky) was an American-bred, French-trained racehorse best known for winning the 1976 Epsom Derby. In a racing career which lasted from September 1975 until July 1976 he ran eight times and won two races. Empery showed some good form in France to be placed third in the Prix Lupin but appeared to be some way below the best colts in his own country. He comfortably defeated the best of the British colts in the Derby to give his jockey Lester Piggott a seventh win in the race. Empery finished second in his only subsequent start and was retired to a stud career of limited success.

== Background ==
Empery was a bay horse bred in Kentucky by his owner the Texas oil company executive Nelson Bunker Hunt. Empery's sire was Vaguely Noble, the winner of the 1968 Prix de l'Arc de Triomphe who also sired Hunt's great racing mare, Dahlia. His grandsire Vienna was owned and raced by Sir Winston Churchill. Empery's dam Peruvian Triple Crown racemare Pamplona II, who had previously produced the Poule d'Essai des Pouliches winner Pampered Miss. Hunt sent the colt to be trained in France by Maurice Zilber.

== Racing career ==
Empery made his racecourse debut in September 1975 when he won a maiden race over 1600 metres at Longchamp Racecourse. He was then moved up in class for the Grand Critérium but finished unplaced behind Manado. On his final start of the year he finished second to Arctic Tern in the Group Three Prix Thomas Bryon at Saint Cloud.

On his three-year-old debut, Empery finished fourth behind Red Lord in the Poule d'Essai des Poulains and then ran poorly when unplaced in the Prix Daphnis. He then produced his best performance to date when finishing third to his stable companion Youth (also owned by Nelson Bunker Hunt) and Arctic Tern in the Group One Prix Lupin at Longchamp. He was then sent to England to contest the Derby, with Lester Piggott who had ridden six previous winners of the race being engaged to ride the colt at Epsom. On 2 June 1976, Empery started at odds of 10/1 for the Derby against twenty-two opponents, with the 2000 Guineas winner Wollow starting 11/10 favourite. Nelson Bunker Hunt was not in attendance for the race, the most valuable ever run in Britain, as he was celebrating his 25th wedding anniversary at home in Dallas. In the early stages of the race, Piggott restrained Empery, before moving up into fourth place at Tattenham Corner. In the straight, Empery made steady progress on the outside to take the lead from Relkino a furlong from the finish. Once in front, he quickly drew clear of the field to win by three lengths. Piggott's seventh win in the race enabled him to surpass the previous record of six, which he had jointly held alongside Jem Robinson and Steve Donoghue.

In the Irish Derby at the Curragh a month later, Empery started 5/4 favourite but finished second, beaten two and a half lengths by another French colt, the François Boutin-trained Malacate. He was then aimed at the Benson & Hedges Gold Cup at York in August, but missed the race after sustaining an injury on the eve of the race. In autumn, Empery was sent to the United States to contest the Man o' War Stakes at Belmont Park. He did not thrive in quarantine however, reportedly losing fifty pounds in three days and failed to recover in time for the race. He was then retired to stud.

== Assessment and honours ==
The independent Timeform organisation gave Empery a rating of 128.

In their book, A Century of Champions, based on the Timeform rating system, John Randall and Tony Morris rated Empery a "poor" winner of the Derby.

== Stud record ==
After his Derby win, Empery was syndicated jointly with Youth, with investors paying $300,000 for a share in both horses. Empery met with modest success at stud. Standing at Hunt's Bluegrass Farm in Lexington, Kentucky, he notably sired Blue Finn, the 1986 Canadian Champion 2-Year-Old Colt, plus U.S. multiple stakes winner, Barbery. Empery is the damsire of Star Over The Bay, a multiple Graded stakes race winner in California. Youth proved little better, siring Teenoso, but little else of any consequence. At age eleven, Empery was sent to a breeding operation in Japan.

== Pedigree ==
Pedigree of Empery (USA), bay stallion, 1973
Sire Vaguely Noble	Vienna	Aureole	Hyperion*
Sire Vaguely Noble	Vienna	Aureole	Angelola
Sire Vaguely Noble	Vienna	Turkish Blood	Turkhan
Sire Vaguely Noble	Vienna	Turkish Blood	Rusk
Sire Vaguely Noble	Noble Lassie	Nearco	Pharos
Sire Vaguely Noble	Noble Lassie	Nearco	Nogara
Sire Vaguely Noble	Noble Lassie	Belle Sauvage	Big Game
Sire Vaguely Noble	Noble Lassie	Belle Sauvage	Tropical Sun*
Dam Pamplona	Postin	Hunter's Moon	Hurry On
Dam Pamplona	Postin	Hunter's Moon	Selene*
Dam Pamplona	Postin	Quinta	Codihue
Dam Pamplona	Postin	Quinta	En Guardia
Dam Pamplona	Society's Way	Kingsway	Fairway
Dam Pamplona	Society's Way	Kingsway	Yenna
Dam Pamplona	Society's Way	Society's Vote	Wyndham
Dam Pamplona	Society's Way	Society's Vote	Converation Piece (Family: 2-s)

* Empery is inbred 4S x 5S to the stallion Hyperion, meaning that he appears fourth generation and fifth generation (via Tropical Sun) on the sire side of his pedigree.

* Empery is inbred 5S x 4D to the mare Selene, meaning that she appears fifth generation (via Hyperion) on the sire side of his pedigree, and fourth generation on the dam side of his pedigree.
