= Exceller =

American-bred Thoroughbred racehorse

- Sire: Vaguely Noble
- Grandsire: Vienna
- Dam: Too Bald
- Damsire: Bald Eagle
- Sex: Stallion
- Foaled: 1973
- Country: United States
- Colour: Bay
- Breeder: Jane Engelhard
- Owner: Nelson Bunker Hunt; Östlund Tränings AB
- Trainer: François Mathet; Maurice Zilber; Charlie Whittingham
- Record: 33:15-5-6
- Earnings: $1,654,003

Major wins
- Prix du Lys (1976); Grand Prix de Paris (1976); Prix Royal-Oak (1976); Coronation Cup (1977); Grand Prix de Saint-Cloud (1977); Canadian International Stakes (1977); Hollywood Gold Cup (1978); Hollywood Invitational Turf Handicap (1978); San Juan Capistrano Handicap (1978); Sunset Handicap (1978); Oak Tree Invitational Stakes (1978); Jockey Club Gold Cup (1978)

Honours
- U.S. Racing Hall of Fame (1999) #96 – Top 100 U.S. Racehorses of the 20th Century; The Exceller Fund
- Last updated on 23 September 2006

Exceller (May 12, 1973 – April 7, 1997) was a racehorse, and widely considered one of the best horses to race in the United States without winning a year-end championship. Despite his exemplary achievements, and his unique accomplishment of being the only horse to ever defeat two U.S. Triple Crown winners in the same race (and only the second ever to do so in his career), Exceller is now remembered more for the tragic manner of his death and the horse rescue movement it helped inspire.

== Background ==
Exceller was foaled on May 12, 1973, in Kentucky. Bred by Mrs. Charles W. Engelhard, he was sold as a yearling for approximately $27,000 to Nelson Bunker Hunt. Hunt's advisors figured that a son of European champion stayer Vaguely Noble with long and upright pasterns, would be better suited to European racing and sent him to France.

== European racing career ==
Trained at first by François Mathet, who had been the trainer for François Dupré, and later by Maurice Zilber, Exceller didn't accomplish much racing as a two-year-old but blossomed as the distances got longer during his three-year-old season. While stablemates Empery and Youth were taking down the French and English Derbys, Exceller won in the grueling Prix Royal-Oak (run at 1 7/8 mile) and the Group 1 Grand Prix de Paris. Shipped to England at age four, he wound up a half-length behind The Minstrel and Orange Bay in the King George VI and Queen Elizabeth Stakes and won the Coronation Cup. Sent to Woodbine Racetrack in Toronto, Canada, Exceller won the Canadian International.

== American racing career ==
In the middle of 1977, Exceller was shipped to California and placed in the care of Charlie Whittingham. At first, Whittingham didn't have high expectations for a horse who walked stiffly on arrival and seemed the worse for wear. However, a little time off and some of Whittingham's expertise soon had Exceller competing and winning against some of the best horses in America.

As a five-year-old in 1978, Exceller had his best season on the racecourse, winning 7 of 10 starts, all in top company, on both dirt and turf racetracks. After claiming the Hollywood Gold Cup, Hollywood Invitational Turf Handicap, San Juan Capistrano Handicap, Sunset Handicap, and Oak Tree Invitational Stakes, Exceller had his crowning moment. With Bill Shoemaker in the saddle, he came from 22 lengths back to beat Triple Crown winners Seattle Slew and Affirmed in the Jockey Club Gold Cup. Affirmed's saddle had slipped, effectively taking him out of the race, and Seattle Slew had hung up almost suicidal fractions on the lead, but Exceller still powered through the Belmont Park mud to win by a nose.

Exceller came back again at age six and managed some placings, but was not quite the same horse.

In sum, he had won 15 of 33 starts, including 13 stakes races, and placed in 11 more in France, England, Canada, and the United States and had earned $1,654,003. He and Noor were the only horses in history to defeat two U.S. Triple Crown winners, and Exceller was the only one to pull off this feat in a single race. Most racing writers agree that, along with Gallant Man and Lure, he may have been the best horse to race in the United States and not win a year-end championship.

Exceller ran best, like many European horses, "covered up"—deep in the pack early. In the late stages of the race he produced a powerful burst of speed and caught the leaders in the stretch. His final quarter mile times are notable because he regularly sprinted this distance in under 25 seconds. His fractions of 23 2/5 seconds at the end of the Hollywood Gold Cup and Oak Tree Invitational is very fast, as 23 seconds is considered a quick first quarter in such a race.

== Stud career ==
Exceller was syndicated and retired to stud at Gainesway Farm in Lexington, Kentucky for the 1980 breeding season. He shared a small stallion barn with his sire Vaguely Noble and classic-winning champion stablemate, Youth. In 1986 (and probably before), he stood for a $50,000 stud fee, the second-highest listed fee at Gainesway at the time.

As time went on, however, it became obvious that Exceller was never going to be a leading sire. By 1991, his stud fee had plummeted to $2,500.

== Death ==
In 1991, the syndicate was bought out by a breeder from Sweden and Exceller was shipped back across the Atlantic Ocean. He sired a few crops of foals, then was diagnosed with a mysterious infection that forced his removal from stud service for several years. When Exceller's owner went bankrupt, the horse was moved to a small farm where he remained for a year before owner Göte Östlund ordered him killed. He was taken to a slaughterhouse and killed for meat on April 7, 1997. According to the woman who tended him- and whose duty it became to kill him- and the Scandinavian Racing Bureau, he wasn't destroyed due to illness or injury, but because he became a liability to his bankrupt owner Göte Östlund.

== Legacy ==
Exceller left behind 16 crops of foals in the United States, including 19 stakes winners and 40 stakes horses, none of them of his quality. His runners were headed by the fillies Slew's Exceller and Squan Song.

Exceller was elected to the National Museum of Racing and Hall of Fame in 1999. Although the museum's website mentions the manner of his death, his plaque in the museum does not, stating only that he died in 1997. His fate, essentially unheard of for an American stallion of his racing class, generated debate over the proper treatment of race horses after their careers on the track were over.

Today, a number of grassroots organizations, such as The Exceller Fund, ReRun, The Communication Alliance to Network Thoroughbred Ex-Racehorses (CANTER), and Old Friends, among others, take inspiration from Exceller's story as they work to purchase and retrain former racehorses for new careers. In addition, had the horse been in the United States, he may well have been given a proper home at the Kentucky Horse Park's Hall of Champions in Lexington as was done after the retired champion thoroughbred Cigar was found to be infertile at stud. Or, the owner might have been able to have handed him over to the Thoroughbred Retirement Foundation in Shrewsbury, New Jersey, the world's largest and most respected organization devoted to equine rescue.

Like Exceller, Kentucky Derby winner Ferdinand ended up in a slaughterhouse in Japan in 2002.

In the Blood-Horse magazine ranking of the top 100 U.S. thoroughbred champions of the 20th century, Exceller was ranked #96.

== Pedigree ==
Pedigree of Exceller (USA), bay stallion, 1973
| Sire Vaguely Noble (IRE) 1965 | Vienna (GB); 1957 | Aureole | Hyperion* |
| Sire Vaguely Noble (IRE) 1965 | Vienna (GB); 1957 | Aureole | Angelola |
| Sire Vaguely Noble (IRE) 1965 | Vienna (GB); 1957 | Turkish Blood | Turkhan |
| Sire Vaguely Noble (IRE) 1965 | Vienna (GB); 1957 | Turkish Blood | Rusk |
| Sire Vaguely Noble (IRE) 1965 | Noble Lassie (GB); 1956 | Nearco* | Pharos* |
| Sire Vaguely Noble (IRE) 1965 | Noble Lassie (GB); 1956 | Nearco* | Nogara* |
| Sire Vaguely Noble (IRE) 1965 | Noble Lassie (GB); 1956 | Belle Sauvage | Big Game |
| Sire Vaguely Noble (IRE) 1965 | Noble Lassie (GB); 1956 | Belle Sauvage | Tropical Sun* |
| Dam Too Bald (USA) 1964 | Bald Eagle (USA); 1955 | Nasrullah* | Nearco* |
| Dam Too Bald (USA) 1964 | Bald Eagle (USA); 1955 | Nasrullah* | Mumtaz Begum* |
| Dam Too Bald (USA) 1964 | Bald Eagle (USA); 1955 | Siama | Tiger |
| Dam Too Bald (USA) 1964 | Bald Eagle (USA); 1955 | Siama | China Face |
| Dam Too Bald (USA) 1964 | Hidden Talent (USA); 1956 | Dark Star | Royal Gem |
| Dam Too Bald (USA) 1964 | Hidden Talent (USA); 1956 | Dark Star | Isolde |
| Dam Too Bald (USA) 1964 | Hidden Talent (USA); 1956 | Dangerous Dame | Nasrullah* |
| Dam Too Bald (USA) 1964 | Hidden Talent (USA); 1956 | Dangerous Dame | Lady Kells (Family: 21-a) |

* Exceller is inbred 3S x 4D x 5D to the stallion Nearco, meaning that he appears third generation on the sire side of his pedigree, and fourth generation and fifth generation (via Nasrullah) on the dam side of his pedigree.

* Exceller is inbred 3D x 4D to the stallion Nasrullah, meaning that he appears third generation and fourth generation on the dam side of his pedigree.

* Exceller is inbred 4S x 5S to the stallion Hyperion, meaning that he appears fourth generation and fifth generation (via Tropical Sun) on the sire side of his pedigree.
