= Turkhan =

British-bred Thoroughbred racehorse

- Sire: Bahram
- Grandsire: Blandford
- Dam: Theresina
- Damsire: Diophon
- Sex: Stallion
- Foaled: 1937
- Country: United Kingdom
- Colour: Bay
- Breeder: Aga Khan III
- Owner: Aga Khan III; Prince Aly Khan
- Trainer: Frank Butters
- Record: 7:3-2-1 (incomplete)

Major wins
- Coventry Stakes (1939); Irish Derby (1940); Yorkshire St Leger (1940)

Turkhan (1937 – after 1952) was a British Thoroughbred racehorse and sire, who raced during World War II and was best known for winning the classic St Leger in 1940. He showed good form as a two-year-old, winning the Coventry Stakes at Royal Ascot. In the following year he finished second in the rescheduled New Derby and won the Irish Derby before taking a substitute Yorkshire St Leger at Thirsk Racecourse in November. He was then retired to stud where he made little impact as a breeding stallion.

== Background ==
Turkhan was a bay horse bred in the United Kingdom by his owner Aga Khan III. He was sired by the Aga Khan' stallion Bahram the winner of the Triple Crown in 1935. Bahram was not a great success as a stallion but did sire Big Game and the Coronation Cup winner Persian Gulf before being exported to the United States in 1941. Turkhan's dam Theresina won the Irish Oaks in 1930 and produced several other winners including the Gold Cup winner Ujiji. Later descendants of Theresina have included Empire Maker and Funny Cide.

The colt was sent into training with the Aga Khan's veteran trainer Frank Butters at his stable in Newmarket, Suffolk. As a young horse, Turkan was a poor mover and was sold privately to the Aga Khan's son Prince Aly Khan.

Turkhan's racing career took place during World War II during which horse racing in Britain was subject to many restrictions. Several major racecourses, including Epsom and Doncaster, were closed for the duration of the conflict, either for safety reasons, or because they were being used by the military. Many important races were rescheduled to new dates and venues, often at short notice, and all five of the Classics were usually run at Newmarket. Wartime austerity also meant that prize money was reduced: Turkhan's St Leger was worth £980 compared to the £10,465 earned by Scottish Union in 1939.

== Racing career ==
=== 1939: two-year-old season ===
Turkhan showed considerable ability a two-year-old in 1939 when he raced in the ownership of Aly Khan. At Royal Ascot in June he started at odds of 100/8 for the Coventry Stakes. Ridden by Charlie Smirke, he won from Jindani and Denturius in "highly impressive" style. In July he started 11/8 favourite for the Ham Produce Stakes but was caught in the final strides and beaten by Lord Rosebery's colt Hippius. Later that year he contested the Middle Park Stakes and finished unplaced behind Djebel, Aly Khan's Tant Mieux and Godiva.

=== 1940: three-year-old season ===
In the spring of 1940, by which time the colt had been returned to the ownership of the Aga Khan, Turkhan finished third behind Tant Mieux and Hippius in the Derby Trial Stakes, run at Hurst Park. With Epsom Downs Racecourse being requisitioned by the military, plans for the 1940 Derby Stakes were fluid, but after plans to run the race at Newbury were abandoned, it eventually took place on the July course at Newmarket on 12 June. Attendance for the race was much smaller than usual, but still substantial, with over 50,000 present. Pont l’Eveque was in front before half way and won decisively but Turkhan finished strongly to take second place.

Racing in England remained severely restricted by the War and Turkhan was sent to neutral Ireland to contest the Irish Derby. Ridden by Smirke, he started the 4/11 favourite and won by two lengths from Scarlet Tiger to win a £2,500 first prize. After the race the Aga Khan let it be known that Turkhan was for sale at a price of £10,000 but there were no buyers.

Doncaster Racecourse, the traditional home of the St Leger was unavailable for racing in 1940 and plans to run the race at Hurst Park and Newmarket were also abandoned. Eventually a substitute "Yorkshire St Leger" was run over one mile seven furlongs at Thirsk Racecourse in late November. Only six horses contested the race and Turkhan, ridden by Gordon Richards started at odds of 4/1 behind his more fancied stablemate Stardust with Hippius, winner of the Champion Stakes being the other major contender. He won by three quarters of a length from Stardust with Hippius taking third place. After the race, the Aga Khan, then living in Switzerland, announced that both Turkhan and Stardust would be immediately retired to stud.

== Assessment ==
In their book A Century of Champions, based on a modified version of the Timeform system, John Randall and Tony Morris rated Turkhan an "inferior" winner of the St Leger.

== Breeding record ==
Turkhan stood as a breeding stallion in Britain until 1952 when he was exported to France. He had little success as a sire of winners but was the broodmare sire of Vienna, the sire of Vaguely Noble.

== Sire line tree ==
- Turkhan
  - Isfahan
    - Sir Isfahan
  - Turkish Prince
  - Turk's Reliance
    - Kazuyoshi

== Pedigree ==
Pedigree of Turkhan (GB), bay stallion, 1937
Sire Bahram (GB) 1932	Blandford (IRE); 1919	Swynford	John o'Gaunt
Sire Bahram (GB) 1932	Blandford (IRE); 1919	Swynford	Canterbury Pilgrim
Sire Bahram (GB) 1932	Blandford (IRE); 1919	Blanche	White Eagle
Sire Bahram (GB) 1932	Blandford (IRE); 1919	Blanche	Black Cherry
Sire Bahram (GB) 1932	Friar's Daughter (GB); 1921	Friar Marcus	Cicero
Sire Bahram (GB) 1932	Friar's Daughter (GB); 1921	Friar Marcus	Prim Nun
Sire Bahram (GB) 1932	Friar's Daughter (GB); 1921	Garron Lass	Roseland
Sire Bahram (GB) 1932	Friar's Daughter (GB); 1921	Garron Lass	Concertina
Dam Theresina (GB) 1927	Diophon (GB); 1921	Grand Parade	Orby
Dam Theresina (GB) 1927	Diophon (GB); 1921	Grand Parade	Grand Geraldine
Dam Theresina (GB) 1927	Diophon (GB); 1921	Donnetta	Donovan
Dam Theresina (GB) 1927	Diophon (GB); 1921	Donnetta	Rinovata
Dam Theresina (GB) 1927	Teresina (GB); 1920	Tracery	Rock Sand
Dam Theresina (GB) 1927	Teresina (GB); 1920	Tracery	Topiary
Dam Theresina (GB) 1927	Teresina (GB); 1920	Blue Tit	Wildfowler
Dam Theresina (GB) 1927	Teresina (GB); 1920	Blue Tit	Petit Bleu (Family:6-d)
