= Long Look (horse) =

American-bred Thoroughbred racehorse

- Sire: Ribot
- Grandsire: Tenerani
- Dam: Santorin
- Damsire: Greek Song
- Sex: Mare
- Foaled: 1962
- Country: United States
- Colour: Bay
- Breeder: James Cox Brady
- Owner: James Cox Brady
- Trainer: Vincent O'Brien
- Record: 8: 2-1-0

Major wins
- Epsom Oaks (1965)

Long Look (1962 – after 1970) was an American-bred, Irish-trained Thoroughbred racehorse and broodmare. After showing promising form as a juvenile in 1964 she developed into a top-class performer in the following year. She recorded her biggest win in the Epsom Oaks as well as finishing second in the Irish Oaks, third in the Prix Vermeille and fourth in the 1000 Guineas. As a broodmare she produced three foals, all of which won races.

== Background ==
Long Look was bay mare with a small white star bred in Kentucky by her owner James Cox Brady, a financier who served as chairman of the NYRA from 1961 to 1969. She was sent to race in Europe and entered training with Vincent O'Brien at Ballydoyle.

She was sired by Ribot, the undefeated, Italian-trained champion who won consecutive runnings of the Prix de l'Arc de Triomphe in 1955 and 1956. As a breeding stallion he was an outstanding sire of middle-distance and staying horses including Ragusa, Ribocco, Ribero, Molvedo, Prince Royal, Boucher, Tom Rolfe, Arts and Letters, Graustark and His Majesty. Long Look's dam Santorin won only one minor race but was a daughter of James Brady's Acorn Stakes winner Secret Meeting. She was also a half-sister to Tomina, the female-line ancestor of many good winners including Fasliyev and Misty For Me.

== Racing career ==
=== 1964: two-year-old season ===
Long Look began her track career by winning the Larragh Stakes over seven furlongs at Leopardstown Racecourse. She was then moved up in class and distance and matched against male opposition when she contested the Beresford Stakes over one mile at the Curragh. She finished unplaced in a race won by the gelding Jealous.

=== 1965: three-year-old season ===
On her first appearance as a three-year-old, Long Look finished unplaced in the Madrid Free Handicap in April. Despite her modest form she was then sent to England for the 1000 Guineas over the Rowley Mile at Newmarket and produced a much better performance, coming home fourth of the sixteen runners behind Night Off, Yami and Mabel.

Long Look was then moved up in distance for the 187th running of the Oaks Stakes over one and a half miles at Epsom Racecourse on 4 June and started at odds of 100/7 (14/1) in a sixteen-runner field. Ridden by the Australian jockey Jack Purtell she won "in fine style" by one and a half lengths from Mabel with Ruby's Princess three quarters of a length back in third.

In July Long Look started odds-on favourite for the Irish Oaks at the Curragh but was beaten into second place by her unfancied stablemate Aurabella. She failed to win in two subsequent races, producing the better performance when finishing third behind Aunt Edith and Dark Wave in the Prix Vermeille at Longchamp Racecourse in September.

== Breeding record ==
At the end of her racing career, Long Look was retired to become a broodmare for her owner's stud. She produced three filly foals, all of whom won races:

- Point Gammon, a bay filly, foaled in 1968, sired by Bold Lad. Won three races.
- Come Back, chestnut filly, 1969, by Bold Lad. Won three races including the Listed Prix de l'Elevage. Grand-dam of Ocean Falls (Prix Quincey) and Pigeon Voyageur (Gran Premio d'Italia).
- North Broadway, dark bay or brown filly, 1970, by Bold Ruler. Won eleven races including the Grade II Sheepshead Bay Stakes.

== Assessment and honours ==
In their book, A Century of Champions, based on the Timeform rating system, John Randall and Tony Morris rated Long Look a "poor" winner of the Oaks.

== Pedigree ==
Pedigree of Long Look (USA), bay mare, 1962
Sire Ribot (GB) 1952	Tenerani (ITY); 1944	Bellini	Cavaliere d'Arpino
Sire Ribot (GB) 1952	Tenerani (ITY); 1944	Bellini	Bella Mina
Sire Ribot (GB) 1952	Tenerani (ITY); 1944	Tofanella	Apelle
Sire Ribot (GB) 1952	Tenerani (ITY); 1944	Tofanella	Try Try Again
Sire Ribot (GB) 1952	Romanella (ITY); 1943	El Greco	Pharos
Sire Ribot (GB) 1952	Romanella (ITY); 1943	El Greco	Gay Gamp
Sire Ribot (GB) 1952	Romanella (ITY); 1943	Barbara Burrini	Papyrus
Sire Ribot (GB) 1952	Romanella (ITY); 1943	Barbara Burrini	Bucolic
Dam Santorin (USA) 1956	Greek Song (USA); 1947	Heliopolis	Hyperion
Dam Santorin (USA) 1956	Greek Song (USA); 1947	Heliopolis	Drift
Dam Santorin (USA) 1956	Greek Song (USA); 1947	Sylvan Song	Royal Minstrel
Dam Santorin (USA) 1956	Greek Song (USA); 1947	Sylvan Song	Glade
Dam Santorin (USA) 1956	Secret Meeting (USA); 1950	Alibhai	Hyperion
Dam Santorin (USA) 1956	Secret Meeting (USA); 1950	Alibhai	Teresina
Dam Santorin (USA) 1956	Secret Meeting (USA); 1950	Burgoo Maid	Burgoo King
Dam Santorin (USA) 1956	Secret Meeting (USA); 1950	Burgoo Maid	Miss Kid (Family 16-h)

- Through her dam Santorin, Long Look was inbred 4 × 4 to Hyperion, meaning that this stallion appears twice in the fourth generation of her pedigree.
