= Ribot (horse) =

Italian-bred Thoroughbred racehorse

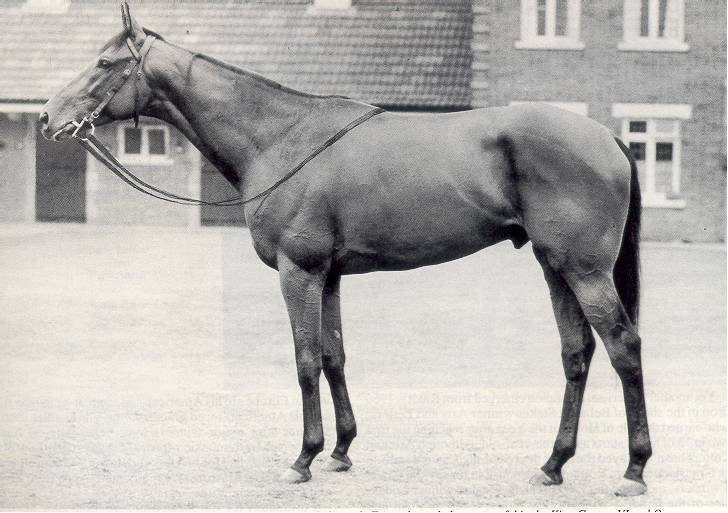
- Sire: Tenerani
- Grandsire: Bellini
- Dam: Romanella
- Damsire: El Greco
- Sex: Stallion
- Foaled: 27 February 1952
- Country: Great Britain
- Colour: Bay
- Breeder: Federico Tesio
- Owner: Lydia Tesio & Mario della Rocchetta (colours: white, red crossbelts, red cap)
- Trainer: Ugo Penco
- Record: 16: 16–0–0
- Earnings: $294,414

Major wins
- Gran Criterium (1954); Gran Premio del Jockey Club (1955); Prix de l'Arc de Triomphe (1955, 1956); Gran Premio di Milano (1956); King George VI and Queen Elizabeth Stakes (1956)

Awards
- Timeform top rated horse (1956); Leading sire in Great Britain & Ireland (1963, 1967, 1968)

Honours
- La Gazzetta dello Sport poll: ranked no. 4 Italian athlete of the 20th century Premio Ribot at Capannelle Racecourse; Horse of the Century (ITA); Timeform rating: 142
- Last updated on 2 August 2023

Ribot (27 February 1952 – 28 April 1972) was a British-bred, Italian-trained Thoroughbred racehorse who won all his 16 races, including the Arc de Triomphe twice. He raced from 5 furlongs (1,000m) to 1m 7f (3,000m) in three countries on all types of track conditions. He is considered by many experts to be one of the best horses ever.

He was the best Italian two-year-old of 1954, when his three wins included the Gran Criterium. He won his first four races of 1955 in Italy before being sent to France where he won the Prix de l'Arc de Triomphe. In the following year, he recorded wide-margin victories in both the King George VI and Queen Elizabeth Stakes and the Prix de l'Arc de Triomphe.

Ribot was then retired to stud where he proved to be a highly successful breeding stallion. The performances of Ribot's progeny saw him become the leading sire in Great Britain & Ireland on three occasions (1963, 1967, 1968).

== Breeding ==
Ribot was bred by Italy's leading Thoroughbred breeder, Federico Tesio, who personally bred six of the horses that appeared in the first three generations of Ribot's pedigree. Ribot was foaled at the English National Stud at Newmarket, Suffolk on 27 February 1952. He was sired by Tenerani an outstanding Italian racehorse whose most notable international success came when he defeated the French champion Arbar in the 1948 Goodwood Cup. Ribot's dam Romanella was a successful broodmare who also produced the Premio Regina Elena winner Rossellina and the Premio Parioli winner Raeburn.

He was described as being a "medium-sized bay with a lovely intelligent head and a perfect temperament. The secret of his success was probably his depth through the heart and there was not a girth at Dormello to fit him." Like many of Tesio's horses, Ribot was named after an artist—in this case, the French realist Théodule-Augustin Ribot. Tesio, who also bred the undefeated and prepotent sire Nearco, did not live to see Ribot develop into a champion. After Tesio's death in May 1954, Ribot was raced by Tesio's widow Donna Lydia and his business partner, Marchese Mario Incisa della Rocchetta.

Ribot was trained in Italy by Ugo Penco and ridden by Enrico Camici. He was nicknamed 'il cavallo super,' meaning 'the super horse'.

== Racing record ==
=== 1954 two-year-old season ===
In 1954 Ribot began his racing career by winning the Premio Tramuschio over 1,000m at San Siro Racecourse by one length. He then won the Criterium Nazionale over 1,200m at the same course by two lengths. He ended the season by running the Gran Criterium over 1,500m at San Siro. In this race Camici attempted to ride a waiting race and Ribot won narrowly by a head from Gail. In all his subsequent races he either led from the start or raced close to the leaders.

=== 1955 three-year-old season ===
Ribot had been unusually small as a yearling, being nicknamed "il piccolo" (little one). As a result, he was never entered in races such as the Premio Parioli and the Derby Italiano.

In 1955 Ribot won the Premio Pisa at Pisa Racecourse by six lengths and then took the Premio Emanuele Filiberto at San Siro by 10 lengths. After a break to allow the colt to recover from a respiratory illness he won the Premio Brembo by one length from Derain, and the Premio Besana over 2,400m by 10 lengths, again beating Derain, who won the St Leger Italiano two weeks later.

In October he raced outside Italy for the first time when he contested the Prix de l'Arc de Triomphe over 2,400 metres at Longchamp Racecourse. Starting at odds of 9/1 he took the lead early in the straight and won by three lengths from Beau Prince. According to press reports, he won very easily, with Camici never resorting to the whip and restraining the colt rather than driving him out in the closing stages. After the race he was surrounded by photographers and given the attention normally reserved for Hollywood film-stars. In his final start of the year he returned to Italy, where he won the Gran Premio del Jockey Club by 15 lengths from the previous year's winner Norman on heavy going.

=== 1956 four-year-old season ===
Ribot began his four-year-old season with three easy wins at San Siro. He won the Premio Giulio Venino over 2,000 metres by four lengths, the Premio Vittuone over 2,400 metres by twelve lengths and the Premio Garbagnate over 2,000 metres by eight lengths from Grand Rapids. He then contested Italy's Premier weight-for-age race, the Gran Premio di Milano, then run over 3,000 metres, at the San Siro. He led from the start and won by eight lengths from Tissot.

In July, Ribot raced outside Italy for the second time when he was sent to England for the sixth running of the King George VI and Queen Elizabeth Stakes over one and a half miles at Ascot Racecourse. Racing on soft ground, he started the 2/5 favourite and won by five lengths from High Veldt and Todrai. His fourteenth consecutive victory saw him equal the record of the pre-War Italian champion Nearco. Ribot then returned to Milan, where he won the Premio del Piazzale over 1,800 metres, winning by eight lengths from a field which included the Premio Parioli winner Magabait.

In October, Ribot returned to Paris for his second Prix de l'Arc de Triomphe. He faced a stronger field than in 1955, with the field including Talgo (Irish Derby), Tanerko, Fisherman, Career Boy, Master Boing (Washington, D.C. International) and Oroso. Ribot took the lead on the turn into the straight and drew away from the field to win by an official margin of six lengths from Talgo. Photographs suggest that the winning margin was more like eight and a half lengths.

== Stud record ==
Retired from racing, Ribot had a very successful career at stud. Under a one-year contract, he first stood at Lord Derby's stud in England. In 1959, he was syndicated for a five-year lease at a cost of $1.35 million before being sent to the United States in a deal of such significance that, in June 1959, Sports Illustrated did a feature article on it.

Originally, Ribot was leased by Darby Dan to stand in the United States for five years. After his temper surfaced, no insurance company would offer a policy to cover shipping him back to Europe. A new contract was worked out, and Ribot remained in the United States until his death. He is buried in the equine cemetery at Darby Dan, near his sons Graustark and His Majesty.

He was leading sire in Great Britain and Ireland on three occasions (1963, 1967 and 1968). His European progeny included Molvedo and Prince Royal, both winners of the Prix de l'Arc de Triomphe, and Ragusa, winner of the Irish Derby, St. Leger, King George VI & Queen Elizabeth Stakes and Eclipse Stakes. In America he sired Long Look, winner of Epsom Oaks; the full brothers Ribocco and Ribero, both winners of the Irish Derby and St. Leger; Boucher, the winner of the 1972 St Leger; Tom Rolfe, winner of the 1965 Preakness Stakes; Arts and Letters, winner of the 1969 Belmont Stakes; and Graustark. Ribot's son His Majesty sired the Kentucky Derby and Preakness Stakes winner Pleasant Colony. His great-grandson Alleged, by Tom Rolfe's son Hoist The Flag, emulated him by winning the Prix de l'Arc de Triomphe in successive years (1977 and 1978).

At least 15 Ribot stallions stood in Australasia, including Arivederci, Angeluccio, Latin Lover, Boucher (USA), Dies, Ribollire, Heir Apparent, Koryo, Regent's Tale, Ruantallan, Ribotlight and Headland. The progeny of the 15 imported stallions had won over A$7 million until late 1979.

== Assessment ==
Timeform awarded Ribot a rating of 133 in 1955, six pounds behind the British-trained sprinter Pappa Fourway. In 1956 he was given a rating of 142, making him the highest-rated horse in Europe.

A Century of Champions, written by John Randall and Tony Morris, states that photographs show Sea-Bird winning the Prix de l'Arc de Triomphe by only four and a half lengths (and not by the official six lengths). Thus, they argue that Ribot's triumph (correctly by eight and half lengths and not by an official six lengths) in the race is de facto the largest winning distance. Randall and Morris rate Ribot the third-best racehorse of the 20th century, behind Sea Bird and Secretariat.

In La Gazzetta dello Sport's poll, Ribot was named the fourth-greatest Italian athlete of the 20th century. The Premio Ribot at Capannelle Racecourse is named in his honour, and he has been named Horse of the Century in Italy.

== Sire line tree ==
- Ribot
  - Arivederci
  - Latin Lover
    - Rain Lover
    - Latin Knight
    - Leica Lover
    - Opening Bowler
  - Molvedo
    - Red Arrow
  - Dies
    - The Champ
  - Ribotlight
  - Romulus
    - Horst Herbert
      - Kifti
  - Angeluccio
  - Ragusa
    - Caliban
    - Homeric
    - Ballymore
      - Ore
      - Exdirectory
      - Seymour Hicks
        - See More Business
      - Call Collect
    - Morston
      - Whitstead
      - More Light
      - Morcon
    - Ragstone
      - Fingal's Cave
      - Ra Nova
  - Con Brio
    - Acertijo
    - Ustaritz
  - Prince Royal
    - Unconscious
  - Ruantallan
  - Sette Bello
  - Tom Rolfe
    - Hoist The Flag
      - Alleged
        - Montelimar
        - Law Society
        - Leading Counsel
        - Hours After
        - Legal Case
        - Strategic Choice
        - Flemensfirth
        - Flat Top
        - Shantou
      - Delta Flag
      - Salutely
        - Make Me A Champ
      - Hoist The King
      - Linkage
      - Stalwart
        - Kingpost
        - Stalwars
        - Stalwart Charger
        - Sacred Honour
    - Run the Gantlet
      - Panamint
      - Ardross
        - Miocamen
        - Karinga Bay
        - Alderbrook
        - Anzum
        - Young Kenny
        - Ackzo
      - Providential
        - Prorutori
      - Commanche Run
        - Bonny Scot
        - Wavy Run
        - Commanche Court
        - Timbera
    - Salt Marsh
    - Bowl Game
    - French Colonial
    - Tantalizing
    - Rough Pearl
    - Allez Milord
  - Graustark
    - Jim French
    - Key to the Mint
      - Sauce Boat
      - Plugged Nickle
      - Gold And Ivory
      - Java Gold
        - Kona Gold
        - Access To Java
        - Boreal
    - Prove Out
    - Prince Dantan
    - Caracolero
    - Avatar
      - Craelius
      - Prince Avatar
    - Gregorian
      - Imperial Choice
    - Protection Racket
    - Proud Truth
      - Truth Of It All
      - Di Stefano
      - Lord Gittens
      - Spago
      - Ay Papa
      - Drago
      - Volveremos
      - Memento
  - Epidendrum
  - Ribocco
    - Ripon
  - Ribero
    - Riboson
    - Torus
      - Mr Mulligan
    - Riberetto
  - Ribollire
  - Arts and Letters
    - Winter's Tale
    - Codex
      - Badger Land
      - Lost Code
    - Lord Darnley
    - Tonzarun
  - Bucaroon
    - Royal Cadenza
  - Headland
  - Koryo
  - Ribofilio
  - Ribot Prince
    - Ako
  - His Majesty
    - Asaltante
    - Cormorant
      - Social Retiree
      - Zinc Tamon O
      - Go For Gin
        - Albert the Great
        - El Autentico
      - Mr Angel
      - Draw Shot
      - Instant Friendship
      - Gander
    - Obraztstovy
    - Pleasant Colony
      - Lac Ouimet
      - Pleasant Variety
      - Cherokee Colony
        - Cherokeeinthehills
      - Pleasant Tap
        - Pleasant Breeze
        - Tap Dance City
        - David Junior
        - Premium Tap
        - Tiago
        - Sahara Sky
      - Roanoke
      - Sir Beaufort
      - St Jovite
        - Amerique
      - Colonial Affair
        - Cafrune
      - Behrens
      - Forbidden Apple
        - Forbidden Bear
      - Colonial Colony
      - Denon
      - Pleasantly Perfect
        - Rapid Redux
        - Idalino
        - Whitmore
        - King Of The Sun
        - Secret Lover
      - Official Visit
        - Almobeer
    - Mehmet
    - Panjandrum
    - Majesty's Prince
      - Dr Kiernan
    - Country Pine
    - Pi Phi Prince
    - Tight Spot
      - Bravo Green
    - Valiant Nature
    - Cetewayo
  - Boucher
    - Lawman
    - Mr Independent
    - Been There
  - Regent's Tale
  - Filiberto
  - Heir Apparent

== Pedigree ==
Pedigree of Ribot (GB), bay stallion, 1952
Sire Tenerani (ITY) B.1944	Bellini (ITY); B. 1937	Cavaliere d'Arpino	Havresac
Sire Tenerani (ITY) B.1944	Bellini (ITY); B. 1937	Cavaliere d'Arpino	Chuette
Sire Tenerani (ITY) B.1944	Bellini (ITY); B. 1937	Bella Minna	Bachelor's Double
Sire Tenerani (ITY) B.1944	Bellini (ITY); B. 1937	Bella Minna	Santa Minna
Sire Tenerani (ITY) B.1944	Tofanella (GB); Ch. 1931	Apelle	Sardanapale
Sire Tenerani (ITY) B.1944	Tofanella (GB); Ch. 1931	Apelle	Angelina
Sire Tenerani (ITY) B.1944	Tofanella (GB); Ch. 1931	Try Try Again	Cylgad
Sire Tenerani (ITY) B.1944	Tofanella (GB); Ch. 1931	Try Try Again	Perseverance
Dam Romanella (ITY) Ch. 1943	El Greco (ITY); Ch. 1934	Pharos	Phalaris
Dam Romanella (ITY) Ch. 1943	El Greco (ITY); Ch. 1934	Pharos	Scapa Flow
Dam Romanella (ITY) Ch. 1943	El Greco (ITY); Ch. 1934	Gay Gamp	Gay Crusader
Dam Romanella (ITY) Ch. 1943	El Greco (ITY); Ch. 1934	Gay Gamp	Parasol
Dam Romanella (ITY) Ch. 1943	Barbara Burrini (GB); Br. 1937	Papyrus	Tracery
Dam Romanella (ITY) Ch. 1943	Barbara Burrini (GB); Br. 1937	Papyrus	Miss Matty
Dam Romanella (ITY) Ch. 1943	Barbara Burrini (GB); Br. 1937	Bucolic	Buchan
Dam Romanella (ITY) Ch. 1943	Barbara Burrini (GB); Br. 1937	Bucolic	Volcanic (Family: 4-l)

== See also ==
- List of leading Thoroughbred racehorses
- List of racehorses
