= Ballymore (horse) =

Irish-bred Thoroughbred racehorse (1969–1986)

- Sire: Ragusa
- Grandsire: Ribot
- Dam: Paddy's Sister
- Damsire: Ballyogan
- Sex: Stallion
- Foaled: 1969
- Country: Ireland
- Colour: Bay
- Breeder: Ardenode Stud
- Owner: Meg Mullion
- Trainer: Paddy Prendergast
- Record: 5: 2-1-1

Major wins
- Irish 2000 Guineas (1972); Nijinsky Stakes (1973)

Awards
- Timeform rating: 123 (1972, 1973)
- Last updated on 27 September 2026

Ballymore (1969 – 1986) was an Irish thoroughbred racehorse and sire. A litle difficult to train, he made only five racecourse appearances but recorded two major victories. Unraced as a juvenile, he made a notable racecourse debut by winning the Irish 2000 Guineas by three lengths in May 1972. He was beaten in the Gallinule Stakes and then finished third in the Irish Derby before missing the rest of the season. He ran poorly on his first run as a four-year-old but then defeated Roberto at level weights in the Nijinsky Stakes in May. He never ran again and was retired from racing at the end of the year. He had some success as a breeding stallion.

== Background ==
Ballymore was a bay horse with no white markings bred in Ireland by the Ardenode Stud, which was owned and managed by Jim and Meg Mullion. During his racing career, Ballymore raced in the colours of Meg Mullion and was trained by Paddy Prendergast.

He was sired by Ragusa, the winner of Irish Derby, King George VI and Queen Elizabeth Stakes and St. Leger Stakesin 1963 and the Eclipse Stakes in the following year. His other notable progeny included The Derby winner Morston and the Ascot Gold Cup winner Ragstone. His dam Paddy's Sister was unbeaten in five starts as a juvenile including the Gimcrack Stakes against colts, but newer ran again after sustaining an injury. Although she was twelve years old when foaling Ballymore, she had produced only two previous live foals. One of these was Paddy's Flair who produced the Poule d'Essai des Pouliches winner Ukraine Girl and was the female-line ancestor of the outstanding steeplechaser Bobs Worth.

== Racing career ==
=== 1972: three-year-old season ===
Ballymore did not race as a two-year-old in 1971 owing to his physical immaturity and some problems with lameness. In the spring of 1972 he was slow to reach fitness and did not have a trial race before making his racecourse debut in the Irish 2000 Guineas over one mile on soft ground at the Curragh on 13 May. He was given little chance of winning and started a 33/1 outsider. The English 2000 Guineas winner High Top was odds-on favourite ahead of Ballymore's stable mate Flair Path, whilst the best fancied of the other eleven runners were Home Guard (winner of the Tetrarch Stakes, Martinmas (Greenham Stakes) and Bog Road (Futurity Stakes). High Top led before giving way to Martinmas at half distance. Ballymore began to make progress three furlongs out and produced a strong run on the outside in the final furlong to take the lead and win by three lengths from Martinmas. After the race Prendergast commented that the colt might be the best horse that he had ever trained.

Ballymore was stepped up in distance for the Gallinule Stakes over ten furlongs at the Curragh in June. In a sprint in the last quarter mile he finished second, four lengths behind Bog Road. In the Irish Derby over one and a half miles at the Curragh on 1 July Ballymore (ridden by Piggott) started 3/1 second favourite behind Epsom Derby winner Roberto in a fourteen-runner field. He came third behind Steel Pulse and Scottish Rifle.

=== 1973: four-year-old season ===
On his first appearance as a four-year-old Ballymore was sent to France for the Prix d'Inauguration over 1600 metres at Every Racecourse in April; he finished last of the six runners behind Gift Card. In May he was matched against odds-on Roberto at level weights in the Nijinsky Stakes over ten furlongs at Leopardstown Racecourse and got the better of a sustained struggle to win by three-quarters of a length. As in 1972, Ballymore did not race in the second half of the season, with Prendergast blaming the firm ground which prevented him from training the horse effectively.

== Assessment ==
In 1972 the independent Timeform organisation gave Ballymore a rating of 123, eleven pounds behind their top-rated three-year-old colts Deep Diver and Sallust. He received the same rating from Timeform in 1973. In their annual "Racehorses of 1973" Timeform commented that he was a good horse, but not a very good one, adding that if he had been able to race more frequently "there might have been a different story to tell".

== Stud record ==
Ballymore was retired from racing and became a breeding stallion at the Ardenode Stud, ostensibly as a replacement for his sire Ragusa who had died in May 1973. He began his stud career at a fee of 1,500 guineas. The best of his offspring included More So (Irish 1000 Guineas), Ore (Henry II Stakes), Seymour Hicks (Great Voltigeur Stakes), Exdirectory (runner-up in the Irish Derby), More Heather (Park Stakes), Raqcuette (third in The Oaks) and Call Collect (Foxhunter Chase). He died in June 1986 at the age of seventeen.

== Sire line tree ==
- Ballymore
  - Ore
  - Exdirectory
  - Seymour Hicks
    - See More Business
  - Call Collect

== Pedigree ==
Pedigree of Ballymore (IRE), bay stallion, 1969
Sire Ragusa (IRE) 1960	Ribot (GB); 1952	Tenerani	Bellini
Sire Ragusa (IRE) 1960	Ribot (GB); 1952	Tenerani	Tofanella
Sire Ragusa (IRE) 1960	Ribot (GB); 1952	Romanella	El Greco
Sire Ragusa (IRE) 1960	Ribot (GB); 1952	Romanella	Barbara Burrini
Sire Ragusa (IRE) 1960	Fantan (USA); 1952	Ambiorix	Tourbillon
Sire Ragusa (IRE) 1960	Fantan (USA); 1952	Ambiorix	Lavendula
Sire Ragusa (IRE) 1960	Fantan (USA); 1952	Red Eye	Petee-Wrack
Sire Ragusa (IRE) 1960	Fantan (USA); 1952	Red Eye	Charred Keg
Dam Paddy's Sister (IRE) 1957	Ballyogan (IRE); 1939	Fair Trial	Fairway
Dam Paddy's Sister (IRE) 1957	Ballyogan (IRE); 1939	Fair Trial	Lady Juror
Dam Paddy's Sister (IRE) 1957	Ballyogan (IRE); 1939	Serial	Solario
Dam Paddy's Sister (IRE) 1957	Ballyogan (IRE); 1939	Serial	Booktalk
Dam Paddy's Sister (IRE) 1957	Birthday Wood (GB); 1949	Bois Roussel	Vatout
Dam Paddy's Sister (IRE) 1957	Birthday Wood (GB); 1949	Bois Roussel	Plucky Liege
Dam Paddy's Sister (IRE) 1957	Birthday Wood (GB); 1949	Birthday Bouquet	Felicitation
Dam Paddy's Sister (IRE) 1957	Birthday Wood (GB); 1949	Birthday Bouquet	Glycine (Family: 7)
