= Tenerani =

Italian-bred Thoroughbred racehorse

- Sire: Bellini
- Grandsire: Cavaliere d'Arpino
- Dam: Tofanella
- Damsire: Apelle
- Sex: Stallion
- Foaled: 1944
- Country: Italy
- Colour: Bay
- Breeder: Lydia & Federico Tesio
- Owner: Federico Tesio
- Trainer: Federico Tesio
- Record: 22: 17-?-?
- Earnings: US$42,141 (equivalent)

Major wins
- Premio Tevere (1946); Gran Premio del Jockey Club (1947); Derby Italiano (1947); Gran Premio di Milano (1947); Premio Natale di Roma (1947); Gran Premio d'Italia (1947); St. Leger Italiano (1947); Goodwood Cup (1948); Queen Elizabeth Stakes (1948); Premio Federico Tesio (1949); Premio Roma (1949)

Awards
- Italian 3-Yr-Old Champion Colt (1947); Timeform rating:135

Tenerani (foaled April 14, 1944 in Italy) was a Champion Thoroughbred racehorse who raced in Italy and in England. Bred by Lydia & Federico Tesio, he was named for the Italian sculptor, Pietro Tenerani. His dam was Tofanella, a foundation broodmare for the Tesio's Dormello Stud in Dormelletto, Italy. Damsire Apelle, owned and bred by Tesio, was one of the first horses from Italy to meet with success in racing outside the county. Tenerani's sire, Bellini, was also bred and raced by Federico Tesio and whose wins included the 1940 Derby Italiano.

Trained by Federico Tesio, Tenerani was winner at age two in 1946, and in 1947 the Italian 3-Yr-Old Champion Colt. Sent to compete in England in 1948, he won the Goodwood Cup and the Queen Elizabeth Stakes, a precursor of the King George VI and Queen Elizabeth Stakes. Tenerani raced and won in Italy at age five in 1949 before being retired to stud duty. In 1951 he was sent to stand at stud in England where he most notably sired Ribot, widely regarded as one of the great horses in the history of Thoroughbred racing.

== Sire line tree ==
- Tenerani
  - Tissot
    - Ortis
  - Bonnard
  - Ribot
    - Arivederci
    - Latin Lover
      - Rain Lover
      - Latin Knight
      - Leica Lover
      - Opening Bowler
    - Molvedo
      - Red Arrow
    - Dies
      - The Champ
    - Ribotlight
    - Romulus
      - Horst Herbert
        - Kifti
    - Angeluccio
    - Ragusa
      - Caliban
      - Homeric
      - Ballymore
        - Ore
        - Exdirectory
        - Seymour Hicks
        - Call Collect
      - Morston
        - Whitstead
        - More Light
        - Morcon
      - Ragstone
        - Fingal's Cave
        - Ra Nova
    - Con Brio
      - Acertijo
      - Ustaritz
    - Prince Royal
      - Unconscious
    - Ruantallan
    - Sette Bello
    - Tom Rolfe
      - Hoist The Flag
        - Alleged
        - Delta Flag
        - Salutely
        - Hoist The King
        - Linkage
        - Stalwart
      - Run the Gantlet
        - Panamint
        - Ardross
        - Providential
        - Commanche Run
      - Salt Marsh
      - Bowl Game
      - French Colonial
      - Tantalizing
      - Rough Pearl
      - Allez Milord
    - Graustark
      - Jim French
      - Key to the Mint
        - Sauce Boat
        - Plugged Nickle
        - Gold And Ivory
        - Java Gold
      - Prove Out
      - Prince Dantan
      - Caracolero
      - Avatar
        - Craelius
        - Prince Avatar
      - Gregorian
        - Imperial Choice
      - Protection Racket
      - Proud Truth
        - Truth Of It All
        - Di Stefano
        - Lord Gittens
        - Spago
        - Ay Papa
        - Drago
        - Volveremos
        - Memento
    - Epidendrum
    - Ribocco
      - Ripon
    - Ribero
      - Riboson
      - Torus
        - Mr Mulligan
      - Riberetto
    - Ribollire
    - Arts and Letters
      - Winter's Tale
      - Codex
        - Badger Land
        - Lost Code
      - Lord Darnley
      - Tonzarun
    - Bucaroon
      - Royal Cadenza
    - Headland
    - Koryo
    - Ribofilio
    - Ribot Prince
      - Ako
    - His Majesty
      - Asaltante
      - Cormorant
        - Social Retiree
        - Zinc Tamon O
        - Go For Gin
        - Mr Angel
        - Draw Shot
        - Instant Friendship
        - Gander
      - Obraztstovy
      - Pleasant Colony
        - Lac Ouimet
        - Pleasant Variety
        - Cherokee Colony
        - Pleasant Tap
        - Roanoke
        - Sir Beaufort
        - St Jovite
        - Colonial Affair
        - Behrens
        - Forbidden Apple
        - Colonial Colony
        - Denon
        - Pleasantly Perfect
        - Official Visit
      - Mehmet
      - Panjandrum
      - Majesty's Prince
        - Dr Kiernan
      - Country Pine
      - Pi Phi Prince
      - Tight Spot
        - Bravo Green
      - Valiant Nature
      - Cetewayo
    - Boucher
      - Lawman
      - Mr Independent
      - Been There
    - Regent's Tale
    - Filiberto
    - Heir Apparent

== Pedigree ==
Pedigree of Tenerani, bay colt, 1944
Sire Bellini	Cavaliere	Havresac	Rabelais
Sire Bellini	Cavaliere	Havresac	Hors Concours
Sire Bellini	Cavaliere	Chuette	Cicero*
Sire Bellini	Cavaliere	Chuette	Chute
Sire Bellini	Bella Minna	Bachelor's Double	Tredennis
Sire Bellini	Bella Minna	Bachelor's Double	Lady Bawn
Sire Bellini	Bella Minna	Santa Minna	Santoi
Sire Bellini	Bella Minna	Santa Minna	Minnow
Dam Tofanella	Apelle	Sardanapale	Prestige
Dam Tofanella	Apelle	Sardanapale	Gemma
Dam Tofanella	Apelle	Angelina	St Frusquin
Dam Tofanella	Apelle	Angelina	Seraphine*
Dam Tofanella	Try Try Again	Cylgad	Cyllene*
Dam Tofanella	Try Try Again	Cylgad	Gadfly
Dam Tofanella	Try Try Again	Perseverance	Persimmon
Dam Tofanella	Try Try Again	Perseverance	Reminiscence (family: 6-d)

* Tenerani is inbred 5S x 5D x 4D to the stallion Cyllene, meaning that he appears fifth generation (via Cicero) on the sire side of his pedigree and fifth generation (via Seraphine) and fourth generation on the dam side of his pedigree.
