= Ragstone (horse) =

British-bred Thoroughbred racehorse

- Sire: Ragusa
- Grandsire: Ribot
- Dam: Fotheringay
- Damsire: Right Royal
- Sex: Stallion
- Foaled: 1970
- Country: United Kingdom
- Colour: Bay
- Breeder: Bernard Fitzalan-Howard, 16th Duke of Norfolk
- Owner: Bernard Fitzalan-Howard, 16th Duke of Norfolk
- Trainer: John Dunlop
- Record: 9: 7-0-1

Major wins
- Aston Park Stakes (1974); Henry II Stakes (1974); Ascot Gold Cup (1974)

Awards
- Timeform Best Stayer (1974); Timeform rating 109 (1973) 128 (1974)

Ragstone (1970–1978) was a British Thoroughbred racehorse and sire. A specialist stayer, he was unplaced in his only run as a two-year-old but won all four of his races in 1973. When moved up in class as a four-year-old he won the Aston Park Stakes and the Henry II Stakes before taking Britain's premier long-distance race, the Ascot Gold Cup. After seven successive wins he was beaten in his next race and retired to stud. He showed some promise as a breeding stallion before dying at the age of eight.

== Background ==
Ragstone was a very good-looking bay horse with a short white sock on his left hind leg bred in England by his owner Bernard Fitzalan-Howard, 16th Duke of Norfolk. The Duke was a senior member of the Jockey Club and the Queen's representative at Ascot Racecourse. He was sired by Ragusa, the winner of Irish Derby, King George VI and Queen Elizabeth Stakes and St. Leger Stakes in 1963 and the Eclipse Stakes in the following year. His other notable progeny included The Derby winner Morston, foaled in the same year as Ragstone. Ragstone was the first winner produced by his dam, Fotheringay, but the mare went on to produce Castle Moon, the dam of Moon Madness and Sheriff's Star. Fotheringay, a granddaughter of the influential broodmare Herringbone, was also the direct female-line ancestor of Celtic Swing. Ragstone was trained throughout his racing career by John Dunlop at Arundel, West Sussex. He was ridden in his major races by the Australian jockey Ron Hutchinson and usually competed in a sheepskin noseband.

== Racing career ==
=== 1972 and 1973: early career ===
On his only appearance as a two-year-old in 1972, Ragstone finished sixth in a minor race over six furlongs at Windsor Racecourse. He did not reappear in the following year until August when he contested a maiden race over one and a half miles at Newbury Racecourse. He won from William Pitt and Admetus, a gelding who went on to win the Washington D.C. International. Ragstone won a minor race over a similar distance at Windsor at odds of 1/4 and then moved up in distance to take a race over fifteen furlongs at Ayr Racecourse, again starting favourite and winning easily. On his fourth and final race of the season, Ragstone was assigned a weight of 133 pounds in the Southfield Handicap over one and a half miles at Newmarket Racecourse in October. He won by a head from the filly Only For Jo to complete an unbeaten campaign.

=== 1974: four-year-old season ===
On his first appearance as a four-year-old Ragstone contested the Aston Park Stakes over thirteen and a half furlongs at Newbury Racecourse in May. He tracked the leader King Levanstell (fourth in the previous year's St Leger) before taking the lead a furlong from the finish and won comfortably despite looking less than fully fit. King Levanstell went on to win the Queen Alexandra Stakes at Royal Ascot. Two weeks later Ragstone was moved up in class for the Henry II Stakes over two miles at Sandown Park Racecourse. Starting the 4/11 favourite he pulled hard in the early stages but took the lead in the last quarter mile and "cantered" to an easy victory over Tameric and Thomas Jefferson.

In the Ascot Gold Cup at Royal Ascot in June Ragstone, ridden as usual by Hutchinson, started the 6/4 favourite. His main opponents were Lassalle the French-trained winner of the race in the previous year, and Proverb, the winner of the 1973 Goodwood Cup. As at Sandown, Ragstone fought hard against Hutchinson's attempts to restrain him in a race which was run at a very slow pace in the early stages. In the straight, Lassalle (ridden by Lester Piggott) accelerated clear of the field but Ragstone quickly made up the deficit, took the lead inside the final furlong and held off the late challenge of Proverb to win by three quarters of a length. The horse's triumph fulfilled what Hutchinson described as a "lifelong ambition" for the Duke of Norfolk, who died a year later. The jockey also said that Ragstone's win was the one which gave him most pleasure during his time in Britain.

Ragstone was then aimed at the Prix de l'Arc de Triomphe, but when made 4/7 favourite for the Geoffrey Freer Stakes at Newbury in August he ran poorly on soft ground, finishing third to Realistic and Freefoot. He sustained an injury in the race and was retired from competition, as it was felt that there was insufficient time to bring him back to peak fitness for the Arc.

== Stud record ==
Ragstone stood as a breeding stallion at the Lavington Stud at Graffham, West Sussex. He began his stud career at a fee of £1,000. After four seasons at stud he was killed in an accident.

The best of his offspring was Fingal's Cave, who won the Cumberland Lodge Stakes and finished third in both the Eclipse Stakes and the King George VI and Queen Elizabeth Stakes. He had some success as a sire of National Hunt horses including the Schweppes Gold Trophy winner Ra Nova.

== Assessment ==
There was no International Classification of European three-year-olds in 1973: the official handicappers of Britain, Ireland and France compiled separate rankings for horses which competed in those countries. In the British Free Handicap, the French-trained filly Dahlia and the Irish-trained colt Thatch were joint-top-rated on 140 pounds, with Ragstone twenty-one pounds behind on 119. The independent Timeform organisation gave Ragstone a rating 109, twenty-seven pounds inferior to their top-rated three-year-old Thatch. In their annual Racehorses of 1973 Timeform wrote that Ragstone would "win good staying races in 1974 if he maintains his progress".

In the British handicap for 1974 he was ranked sixth among the older horses, level with Buoy and behind Dahlia, Admetus and the sprinters Blue Cashmere, New Model and Singing Bede. Timeform named him their best stayer of the year with a rating of 128, eight pounds behind their Horse of the Year Allez France. In Racehorses of 1973 Timeform described him as the best Gold Cup winner since Levmoss.

In their book A Century of Champions, based on a modified version of the Timeform system, John Randall and Tony Morris rated Ragstone as an "average" winner of the Gold Cup.

== Pedigree ==
Pedigree of Ragstone (GB), bay stallion, 1970
Sire Ragusa (IRE) 1960	Ribot (GB); 1952	Tenerani	Bellini
Sire Ragusa (IRE) 1960	Ribot (GB); 1952	Tenerani	Tofanella
Sire Ragusa (IRE) 1960	Ribot (GB); 1952	Romanella	El Greco
Sire Ragusa (IRE) 1960	Ribot (GB); 1952	Romanella	Barbara Burrini
Sire Ragusa (IRE) 1960	Fantan (USA); 1952	Ambiorix	Tourbillon
Sire Ragusa (IRE) 1960	Fantan (USA); 1952	Ambiorix	Lavendula
Sire Ragusa (IRE) 1960	Fantan (USA); 1952	Red Eye	Petee-Wrack
Sire Ragusa (IRE) 1960	Fantan (USA); 1952	Red Eye	Charred Keg
Dam Fotheringay (FR) 1964	Right Royal (FR); 1958	Owen Tudor	Hyperion*
Dam Fotheringay (FR) 1964	Right Royal (FR); 1958	Owen Tudor	Mary Tudor
Dam Fotheringay (FR) 1964	Right Royal (FR); 1958	Bastia	Victrix
Dam Fotheringay (FR) 1964	Right Royal (FR); 1958	Bastia	Barberybush
Dam Fotheringay (FR) 1964	La Fresnes (GB); 1953	Court Martial	Fair Trial
Dam Fotheringay (FR) 1964	La Fresnes (GB); 1953	Court Martial	Intantaneous
Dam Fotheringay (FR) 1964	La Fresnes (GB); 1953	Pin Stripe	Hyperion*
Dam Fotheringay (FR) 1964	La Fresnes (GB); 1953	Pin Stripe	Herringbone (Family: 8-c)

* Ragstone is inbred 4D x 4D to the stallion Hyperion, meaning that he appears fourth generation twice on the dam side of his pedigree.
