= Boucher (horse) =

American-bred Thoroughbred racehorse

- Sire: Ribot
- Grandsire: Tenerani
- Dam: Glamour
- Damsire: Nasrullah
- Sex: Stallion
- Foaled: 7 April 1969
- Country: United States
- Colour: Chestnut
- Breeder: Ogden Phipps
- Owner: Ogden Phipps
- Trainer: Vincent O'Brien
- Record: 9:6-1-0

Major wins
- Beresford Stakes (1971); Nijinsky Stakes (1972); Desmond Stakes (1972); St. Leger Stakes (1972)

Honours
- Timeform rating 124

Boucher (1969 – after 1986), was an American-bred, Irish-trained Thoroughbred racehorse and sire. In Ireland he won the Beresford Stakes as a two-year-old in 1971 and went on to win the Nijinsky Stakes and the Desmond Stakes in 1972. In September 1972 he was sent to England where he won the St. Leger Stakes at Doncaster. At the end of the season he was retired to stand as a stallion in Australia, where he had some success as a sire of winners.

== Background ==
Boucher was a chestnut horse bred in Kentucky by his owner Ogden Phipps. He was sired by the undefeated Italian champion Ribot out of the mare Glamour. As a descendant of the broodmare La Troienne, Boucher was a member of the Thoroughbred Family 1-x, which has produced numerous important winners including Buckpasser, Easy Goer and Allez France. Phipps sent the colt to be trained in Ireland by Vincent O'Brien at Ballydoyle. Although Boucher was named after the painter François Boucher his name was usually pronounced BOW-chər (/ˈbaʊtʃər/).

== Racing career ==
=== 1971: two-year-old season ===
Boucher won two of his three races as a two-year-old in 1971. After winning a maiden race he was moved up in class and won the Group Two Beresford Stakes at the Curragh. He was then sent to England to contest the Group One Observer Gold Cup at Doncaster. He finished fourth behind the English-trained High Top, who went on to win the following season's 2000 Guineas.

=== 1972: three-year-old season ===
Boucher began his three-year-old season by winning the Nijinsky Stakes. He was then sent to England for the Chester Vase, an important trial race for The Derby. He started favourite, but made no impression, finishing last of the six runners behind Ormindo. He was subsequently found to be suffering from a viral infection and was off the course for three months.

Boucher returned in August and won a handicap race over ten furlongs at Leopardstown. He then won the Group Three Desmond Stakes at the Curragh, beating the filly Pidget who had won the Irish 1000 Guineas and went on to win the Irish St Leger. In the St Leger at Doncaster, Boucher started at odds of 3/1 against six opponents, with the Irish Derby winner, Steel Pulse, being made the 9/4 favourite. Ridden by Lester Piggott he moved up to challenge for the lead two furlongs from the finish and won after a struggle by half a length from Our Mirage, with The Oaks winner Ginevra four lengths further back in third. The race was run on extremely soft ground and the winning time of 3:28.71 was the slowest recorded at Doncaster in the 20th century. On his only subsequent appearance, Boucher ran in the Prix de l'Arc de Triomphe, a race for which he had reportedly been strongly fancied by Vincent O'Brien. He raced prominently and contested the lead in the straight but was outpaced in the closing stages and finished unplaced behind San San.

== Assessment ==
Boucher was given a rating of 124 by Timeform in 1972. This was the lowest rating given to a St Leger winner in the organisation's history.

== Stud career ==
Boucher was sold for A$530,000 to the Australian breeder John Kelly exported to stand as a stallion at the Newhaven Park Stud in New South Wales. He sired several good winners including Lawman (Doncaster Handicap), Been There (Silver Slipper Stakes) and Mr Independent (Carlyon Cup).The last of Boucher's foals were born in 1987.

== Pedigree ==
Pedigree of Boucher (USA), chestnut stallion, 1969
Sire Ribot (GB) 1952	Tenerani; 1944	Bellini	Cavaliere d'Arpino
Sire Ribot (GB) 1952	Tenerani; 1944	Bellini	Bella Mina
Sire Ribot (GB) 1952	Tenerani; 1944	Tofanella	Apelle
Sire Ribot (GB) 1952	Tenerani; 1944	Tofanella	Try Try Again
Sire Ribot (GB) 1952	Romanella; 1943	El Greco	Pharos*
Sire Ribot (GB) 1952	Romanella; 1943	El Greco	Gay Gamp
Sire Ribot (GB) 1952	Romanella; 1943	Barbara Burrini	Papyrus
Sire Ribot (GB) 1952	Romanella; 1943	Barbara Burrini	Bucolic
Dam Glamour (USA) 1953	Nasrullah; 1940	Nearco	Pharos*
Dam Glamour (USA) 1953	Nasrullah; 1940	Nearco	Nogara
Dam Glamour (USA) 1953	Nasrullah; 1940	Mumtaz Begum	Blenheim
Dam Glamour (USA) 1953	Nasrullah; 1940	Mumtaz Begum	Mumtaz Mahal
Dam Glamour (USA) 1953	Striking; 1947	War Admiral	Man o' War
Dam Glamour (USA) 1953	Striking; 1947	War Admiral	Brushup
Dam Glamour (USA) 1953	Striking; 1947	Baby League	Bubbling Over
Dam Glamour (USA) 1953	Striking; 1947	Baby League	La Troienne (Family: 1-x)

* Boucher is inbred 4S x 4D to the stallion Pharos, meaning that he appears fourth generation on the sire side of his pedigree and fourth generation on the dam side of his pedigree.
