= Ribero =

American-bred Thoroughbred racehorse

- Sire: Ribot
- Grandsire: Tenerani
- Dam: Libra
- Damsire: Hyperion
- Sex: Stallion
- Foaled: 1965
- Country: United States
- Colour: Bay
- Breeder: Margaret Hager Rogers
- Owner: Charles W. Engelhard, Jr.
- Trainer: Fulke Johnson Houghton
- Record: 12:3-1-3

Major wins
- Irish Derby Stakes (1968); St. Leger Stakes (1968)
- Last updated on July 26, 2008

Ribero (foaled 1965 in Kentucky) was an American-bred British-trained Thoroughbred racehorse and sire. In a career which lasted from September 1967 until May 1969 he ran twelve times and won three races. He is best known for his performances in 1968 when he won two of the most important European races for three-year-olds; the Irish Derby (in which he defeated Sir Ivor), and the St Leger.

== Background ==
Ribero was a bay horse with no white markings standing 16.1 1/2 hands high. He was bred at the Idle Hour Farm in Paris, Kentucky by Mrs J. G. (Margaret) Rogers. As a yearling he was sent to the Keeneland sales where he was bought for $50,000 by Charles W. Engelhard, Jr. Ribero was a son of the undefeated dual Prix de l'Arc de Triomphe winner, Ribot out of the mare Libra. Libra won only one minor race, but went on to become a notable broodmare, producing Ribocco (Irish Derby, St Leger) and Libra's Rib (Princess of Wales's Stakes). Ribero was sent to England to be trained by Fulke Johnson Houghton at Blewbury in Berkshire.

== Racing career ==
=== 1967: two-year-old season ===
Ribero made his racecourse debut in Feversham Stakes over seven furlongs at Doncaster in September in which he finished fourth. In the final race of the British flat racing season at Haydock Park Racecourse in November, Ribero recorded his first victory when he won the six furlong Bury Stakes by a length at odds of 2/5.

=== 1968: three-year-old season ===
In the spring of 1968, Ribero was campaigned in trial races for The Derby. He finished fourth in the Blue Riband Trial Stakes at Epsom and third in the Dante Stakes at York a race in which he did not help his cause by veering to the right in the closing stages.

Ribero was withdrawn from the Derby and sent instead to Ascot to contest the King Edward VII Stakes. Ribero was required to concede four pounds to the Epsom Derby runner-up Connaught, who beat him by twelve lengths. In the Irish Derby at the Curragh at the end of June, Ribero started as a 16/1 outsider with the Derby winner Sir Ivor starting 1/3 favourite. Sir Ivor was ridden by the Irish jockey Liam Ward, while Lester Piggott, who had ridden the colt to victory in the Derby, took the ride on Ribero. Ribero turned into the straight in second place behind Giolla Mear before moving up along the rail to take the lead and win by two lengths from Sir Ivor and record a "stunning upset" victory. Ribero was well-fancied for the King George VI and Queen Elizabeth Stakes at Ascot in July, but unseated Piggott and bolted before the start, only being brought under control after several minutes. He finished fourth behind Royal Palace, Felicio and Topyo. In August, Ribero was moved up in distance to contest the Prix Kergorlay over 3000 m but ran poorly, finishing last of the seven runners.

In September, Ribero was sent to Doncaster to contest the Classic St Leger over 14 1/2 furlongs. He started at odds of 100/30 in a field of eight runners, with Connaught being made odds-on favourite in a race run on very soft ground. Ridden by Piggott, Ribero turned into the straight in fourth place before taking the lead 1 1/2 furlongs from the finish and holding the late challenge of the Irish-trained Canterbury to win by a short head, with Connaught fifth. Piggott reportedly showed great control and composure, never using his whip on the temperamental colt, despite the closeness of the finish. On his only subsequent appearance of the season, Ribero was kicked by another horse at the start of the Prix de l'Arc de Triomphe and finished unplaced behind Vaguely Noble.

=== 1969: four-year-old season ===
Ribero ran twice as a four-year-old without success. He finished third to Torpid in the Jockey Club Stakes at Newmarket and third again to Remand in the Westbury Stakes at Sandown. He was sent to Epsom to contest the Coronation Cup but was withdrawn before the start.

== Stud career ==
Ribero stood as a stallion in England at the Royal Studs at Sandringham, but made little impression as a sire of winners. His best winners included Riboson (Yorkshire Cup) and Riberetto (Lingfield Derby Trial). His son Torus became a successful National Hunt stallion, siring the Cheltenham Gold Cup winner Mr Mulligan. Ribero was sold and exported to Japan in 1978. He was "put out of stud" in Japan in December 1985.

== Sire line tree ==
- Ribero
  - Riboson
  - Torus
    - Mr Mulligan
  - Riberetto

== Pedigree ==
Pedigree of Ribero (USA), bay stallion, 1965
Sire Ribot (GB) 1952	Tenerani; 1944	Bellini	Cavaliere d'Arpino
Sire Ribot (GB) 1952	Tenerani; 1944	Bellini	Bella Mina
Sire Ribot (GB) 1952	Tenerani; 1944	Tofanella	Apelle
Sire Ribot (GB) 1952	Tenerani; 1944	Tofanella	Try Try Again
Sire Ribot (GB) 1952	Romanella; 1943	El Greco	Pharos
Sire Ribot (GB) 1952	Romanella; 1943	El Greco	Gay Gamp
Sire Ribot (GB) 1952	Romanella; 1943	Barbara Burrini	Papyrus
Sire Ribot (GB) 1952	Romanella; 1943	Barbara Burrini	Bucolic
Dam Libra (GB) 1956	Hyperion; 1930	Gainsborough	Bayardo
Dam Libra (GB) 1956	Hyperion; 1930	Gainsborough	Rosedrop
Dam Libra (GB) 1956	Hyperion; 1930	Selene	Chaucer
Dam Libra (GB) 1956	Hyperion; 1930	Selene	Serenissima
Dam Libra (GB) 1956	Weighbridge; 1945	Portlaw	Beresford
Dam Libra (GB) 1956	Weighbridge; 1945	Portlaw	Portree
Dam Libra (GB) 1956	Weighbridge; 1945	Golden Way	Gold Bridge
Dam Libra (GB) 1956	Weighbridge; 1945	Golden Way	Adria (Family: 4-c)
