= Prince Royal (horse) =

British-bred Thoroughbred racehorse

- Sire: Ribot
- Grandsire: Tenerani
- Dam: Pange
- Damsire: King's Bench
- Sex: Stallion
- Foaled: 1961
- Country: Great Britain
- Colour: Bay
- Breeder: Charles W. Wacker III
- Owner: 1) Dr. Carlo Bassignana
- Trainer: 1) Giuseppe Galbiati; 2) Georges Bridgland
- Record: 12: 7-0-1
- Earnings: ₤26,856,000 & ₣1,094,126

Major wins
- Premio Tevere (1963); Premio Besana (1964); Gran Premio di Milano (1964); Prix de l'Arc de Triomphe (1964)

Awards
- Timeform rating 134 (1964); Timeform top-rated three-year-old (1964)

Prince Royal (1961 – 4 August 1983), known as Prince Royal II in the United States, was a British-bred Thoroughbred racehorse best known for winning France's prestigious Prix de l'Arc de Triomphe.

== Background ==
Bred by Charles W. Wacker III, Prince Royal was sired was the undefeated Italian runner and leading sire in Great Britain and Ireland, Ribot. His dam, Pange, also produced Senibility, the grand-dam of the Breeders' Cup Turf winner Theatrical

Prince Royal was sold to Italy's Dr. Carlo Bassignana at the December 1961 Tattersalls sale for approximately $10,600 and sent into training with Giuseppe Galbiati in Italy.

== Racing career ==
The colt began his career in racing at age two in Italy where he had one win in four of his 1963 starts with a third-place finish in Italy's most important race for his age group, the Gran Criterium. Racing at age three in 1964, Prince Royal won his first three starts before finishing fourth in the Gran Premio d'Italia. He came back to win the Gran Premio di Milano and ran away from the opposition to win the Premio Besana by fifteen lengths.

Prince Royal was then sent to race in France. He ran in the Prix Royal-Oak in poor racing condition and was held back, finishing last to Baron Guy de Rothschild's winning colt, Barbieri. Negotiations, which had been going on prior to the Prix Royal-Oak, saw American Rex Ellsworth purchase Prince Royal for a reported US$400,000 who turned him over to French trainer, Georges Bridgland. For his new owner and trainer, Prince Royal was next entered in the October 4th running of the Prix de l'Arc de Triomphe. Up against older horses, the three-year-old colt won the forty-third running of France's most important race.

Following Prince Royal's Arc victory he was retired from racing and sent to the United States where he was registered as "Prince Royal II".

== Assessment ==
In 1964, the Independent Timeform organisation awarded Prince Royal a rating of 134, making him the highest-rated three-year-old colt of the season ahead of The Derby winner Santa Claus. In their book A Century of Champions, based on a modified version of the Timeform system, John Randall and Tony Morris rated Prince Royal as an "average" winner of the Prix de l'Arc de Triomphe.

Prince Royal was the Italian Champion Three-Year-Old Colt of 1964.

== Stud record ==
Prince Royal served stud duty at owner Rex Ellworth's breeding operation in Southern California's Chino Valley from 1965 through 1973. He met with little success as a stallion, siring just seven stakes race winners from 268 foals. He did however have one son, Unconscious, who won the 1971 San Felipe Handicap and the 1972 Strub Stakes. Acquired by a Japanese breeder, he stood at stud in Japan from 1974 to 1983 and died on 4 August 1983.

== Pedigree ==
Pedigree of Prince Royal (GB), 1961
Sire Ribot (GB) 1952	Tenerani (ITY); 1944	Bellini	Cavaliere d'Arpino
Sire Ribot (GB) 1952	Tenerani (ITY); 1944	Bellini	Bella Minna
Sire Ribot (GB) 1952	Tenerani (ITY); 1944	Tofanella	Apelle
Sire Ribot (GB) 1952	Tenerani (ITY); 1944	Tofanella	Try Try Again
Sire Ribot (GB) 1952	Romanella (ITY); 1943	El Greco	Pharos
Sire Ribot (GB) 1952	Romanella (ITY); 1943	El Greco	Gay Gamp
Sire Ribot (GB) 1952	Romanella (ITY); 1943	Barbara Burrini	Papyrus
Sire Ribot (GB) 1952	Romanella (ITY); 1943	Barbara Burrini	Bucolic
Dam Pange (GB) 1955	King's Bench (GB); 1949	Court Martial	Fair Trial
Dam Pange (GB) 1955	King's Bench (GB); 1949	Court Martial	Instantaneous
Dam Pange (GB) 1955	King's Bench (GB); 1949	King's Cross	King Salmon*
Dam Pange (GB) 1955	King's Bench (GB); 1949	King's Cross	Doublure
Dam Pange (GB) 1955	York Gala (GB); 1939	His Grace	Blandford
Dam Pange (GB) 1955	York Gala (GB); 1939	His Grace	Malva*
Dam Pange (GB) 1955	York Gala (GB); 1939	Princess Galahad	Prince Galahad
Dam Pange (GB) 1955	York Gala (GB); 1939	Princess Galahad	Penny Flyer (Family: 3-h)

* Prince Royal is inbred 5D x 4D to the mare Malva, meaning that she appears fifth generation (via King Salmon) and fourth generation on the dam side of his pedigree.
