= Sette Bello =

American-bred Thoroughbred racehorse

- Sire: Ribot
- Grandsire: Tenerani
- Dam: Honor Bound
- Damsire: Bull Dog
- Sex: Stallion
- Foaled: 1962
- Country: United States
- Colour: Bay
- Breeder: Robert Lehman
- Owner: Robert Lehman
- Trainer: James P. Conway
- Record: 46: 9-5-4
- Earnings: US$179,999

Major wins
- Widener Handicap (1968)

Sette Bello (1962–1979) was an American Thoroughbred racehorse best known for winning the 1968 Widener Handicap at Hialeah Park Race Track in Florida and as the damsire of Timely Writer. Sired by the Italian runner, Ribot, Sette Belo's dam was Honor Bound, a daughter of Bull Dog.

Sette Bello was bred and raced by New York City investment banker Robert Lehman and race conditioned by U.S. Racing Hall of Fame trainer, Jimmy Conway. Sette Bello was named by Mrs. Lehman after an Italian express train run from Milan to Rome, the Settebello, which can be translated as the "lucky or beautiful seven."

== Pedigree ==
Pedigree of Sette Bello, bay colt, 1962
Sire Ribot	Tenerani	Bellini	Cavaliere Darpino
Sire Ribot	Tenerani	Bellini	Bella Minna
Sire Ribot	Tenerani	Tofanella	Apelle
Sire Ribot	Tenerani	Tofanella	Try Try Again
Sire Ribot	Romanella	El Greco	Pharos
Sire Ribot	Romanella	El Greco	Gay Gamp
Sire Ribot	Romanella	Barbara Burrini	Papyrus
Sire Ribot	Romanella	Barbara Burrini	Bucolic
Dam Honor Bound	Bull Dog	Teddy	Ajax
Dam Honor Bound	Bull Dog	Teddy	Rondeau
Dam Honor Bound	Bull Dog	Plucky Liege	Spearmint
Dam Honor Bound	Bull Dog	Plucky Liege	Concertina
Dam Honor Bound	Anchors Ahead	Man o' War	Fair Play
Dam Honor Bound	Anchors Ahead	Man o' War	Mahubah
Dam Honor Bound	Anchors Ahead	Friar’s Carse	Friar Rock
Dam Honor Bound	Anchors Ahead	Friar’s Carse	Problem (family: 1-h)
