= Molvedo =

Italian-bred Thoroughbred racehorse

- Sire: Ribot
- Grandsire: Tenerani
- Dam: Maggiolina
- Damsire: Nakamuro
- Sex: Stallion
- Foaled: 1958
- Country: Italy
- Colour: Brown
- Breeder: Razza Ticino
- Owner: Egidio Vergo
- Trainer: Arturo Maggi
- Record: 8:7-0-1

Major wins
- Gran Criterium (1960); Premio Carlo Porta (1960); Grand Prix de Deauville (1961); Prix de l'Arc de Triomphe (1961); Gran Premio del Jockey Club (1961)

Awards
- Timeform top-rated horse (1961); Timeform rating 137

Molvedo (1958–1987) was an Italian Thoroughbred racehorse and sire. The leading Italian two-year-old of 1960, he missed the first half of the following season through injury but returned to win his remaining four races, establishing himself as the top racehorse in Europe and one of the best horses ever trained in Italy. The highlight of his career came in France's most prestigious and valuable race, the Prix de l'Arc de Triomphe in October, in which he defeated a strong international field. He was retired to stud at the end of 1961 and had some success as a breeding stallion.

== Background ==
Molvedo was a brown horse standing 1.68 metres bred near Varese in Italy by the Razza Ticino. He was from the first crop of foals sired by Ribot, the best horse ever trained in Italy, who was unbeaten in a career of 16 races including two runnings of the Prix de l'Arc de Triomphe and the 1956 King George VI and Queen Elizabeth Stakes. Molvedo's dam, Maggiolina, was a descendant of the British broodmare Pearl Maiden and therefore from the same branch of Thoroughbred family 16-b which produced the Prix de l'Ard de Triomphe winner Pearl Cap and The Derby winner Pearl Diver. The colt was owned by Egidio Verga and trained throughout his career by Arturo Maggi near Milan. Molvedo was ridden in all of his major races by Enrico Camici.

== Racing career ==
=== 1960: two-year-old season ===
Molvedo was the leading two-year-old in Italy in 1960. He won three of his four races, sustaining his only defeat when third to Adrasto in the Criterium Nazionale. In October, he won the Gran Criterium over 1600 metres at San Siro Racecourse in Milan and the Premio Carlo Porta over 2000 metres at the same venue.

=== 1961: three-year-old season ===
Molvedo had muscular problems and was lame in the spring of 1961 before reappearing in July, when he won the Premio d'Estate. In August, he was sent to race in France, where he contested the Grand Prix de Deauville over 2600 metres at Deauville Racecourse. He won by four lengths from Prix Ganay winner Misti with Taine in third place. In October, he returned to France for the Prix de l'Arc de Triomphe over 2400 metres at Longchamp Racecourse and started at odds of 1.8/1 in a field of nineteen runners. The race was expected to lie between Molvedo and the French four-year-old Right Royal, who had won the King George VI and Queen Elizabeth Stakes at Ascot Racecourse in July and who started favourite despite fears that he would be unsuited by the soft ground. Molvedo tracked the British runner High Hat (owned by Winston Churchill) before taking the lead early in the straight. The Italian colt opened a two-length lead and was never seriously challenged, winning from Right Royal with Misti in third ahead of High Hat and Match. On his final appearance, Molvedo returned to his home track at Milan and won the Gran Premio del Jockey Club by four lengths.

== Assessment ==
The independent Timeform organisation assigned a rating of 137 to Molvedo in 1961, making him the highest-rated horse in Europe.

In their book A Century of Champions, based on a modified version of the Timeform system, John Randall and Tony Morris rated Molvedo the third-best Italian racehorse of the 20th century behind Ribot and Nearco. They also rated him the best horse foaled in 1958 and the best horse in the world in 1961.

== Stud record ==
Molvedo made little impact as a sire in international terms, but had some success in his native Italy. His son Red Arrow won the Derby Italiano and the Gran Premio d'Italia in 1976, enabling Molvedo to be that season's champion Italian sire. He was also the damsire of Le Marmot and Orange Bay. Molvedo died in 1987.

== Pedigree ==
Pedigree of Molvedo (ITY), brown stallion, 1958
Sire Ribot (ITY)	Tenerani (ITY)	Bellini	Cavaliere d'Arpino*
Sire Ribot (ITY)	Tenerani (ITY)	Bellini	Bella Minna
Sire Ribot (ITY)	Tenerani (ITY)	Tofanella	Apelle
Sire Ribot (ITY)	Tenerani (ITY)	Tofanella	Try Try Again
Sire Ribot (ITY)	Romanella (ITY)	El Greco	Pharos*
Sire Ribot (ITY)	Romanella (ITY)	El Greco	Gay Gamp
Sire Ribot (ITY)	Romanella (ITY)	Barbara Burrini	Papyrus
Sire Ribot (ITY)	Romanella (ITY)	Barbara Burrini	Bucolic
Dam Maggiolina (ITY)	Nakamuro (ITY)	Cameronian	Pharos*
Dam Maggiolina (ITY)	Nakamuro (ITY)	Cameronian	Una Cameron
Dam Maggiolina (ITY)	Nakamuro (ITY)	Nogara	Havresac*
Dam Maggiolina (ITY)	Nakamuro (ITY)	Nogara	Catnip
Dam Maggiolina (ITY)	Murica (ITY)	Pilade	Captain Cuttle
Dam Maggiolina (ITY)	Murica (ITY)	Pilade	Piera
Dam Maggiolina (ITY)	Murica (ITY)	Muci	Tetratema
Dam Maggiolina (ITY)	Murica (ITY)	Muci	Pearl Maiden (Family: 16-b)

* Molvedo is inbred 4S x 4D to the stallion Pharos, meaning that he appears fourth generation on the sire side of his pedigree and fourth generation on the dam side of his pedigree.

* Molvedo is inbred 5S x 4D to the stallion Havresac, meaning that he appears fifth generation (via Cavaliere d'Arpino) on the sire side of his pedigree and fourth generation on the dam side of his pedigree.
