= Aunt Edith =

British-bred Thoroughbred racehorse (1962–1986)

- Sire: Primera
- Grandsire: My Babu
- Dam: Fair Edith
- Damsire: Hyperion
- Sex: Mare
- Foaled: 1962
- Country: United Kingdom
- Colour: Chestnut
- Breeder: C B Hornung
- Owner: John Hornung
- Trainer: Noel Murless
- Record: 9:4-1-0

Major wins
- Nassau Stakes (1965); Prix Vermeille (1965); Yorkshire Cup (1966); King George VI and Queen Elizabeth Stakes (1966)

Honours
- Timeform Top-rated three-year-old filly (1965); Timeform Top-rated older female (1966)
- Last updated on 7 September 2025

Aunt Edith (1962–1986) was a British-bred Thoroughbred racehorse and broodmare. In a career which lasted from 1964 until October 1966 she ran nine times and won four races. As a three-year-old in 1965 she won the Nassau Stakes and the Prix Vermeille. In 1966 she won the Yorkshire Cup before becoming the first filly to win the King George VI and Queen Elizabeth Stakes. After being retired from racing she became a successful broodmare.

== Background ==
Aunt Edith was a chestnut mare bred by Colonel C. B. Hornung. She raced in the colours of her breeder's son John Hornung. She was sired by Primera, a stayer from the Byerley Turk sire line, who won two runnings of the Princess of Wales's Stakes and the Ebor Handicap. Her dam, Fair Edith, was of no account as a racehorse, but was a daughter of Afterthought, who finished second to Sun Chariot in the 1942 New Oaks. The filly was sent into training with Noel Murless at his Warren Place stable in Newmarket, Suffolk. As a descendant of the broodmare Kermesse, Aunt Edith was related to Colombo, Sweet Solera and Honest Pleasure.

== Racing career ==
=== 1964: two-year-old season ===
Aunt Edith ran twice as a two-year-old, finishing unplaced on both occasions.

=== 1965: three-year-old season ===
On her first appearance as a three-year-old, Aunt Edith finished second to Arctic Melody in the Musidora Stakes at York in May. Aunt Edith did not run again until August when she recorded her first win when taking the Nassau Stakes at Goodwood Racecourse.

In September, Aunt Edith was sent to Paris to contest the Prix Vermeille at Longchamp Racecourse. The field was exceptionally strong, including Long Look and Blabla (Prix de Diane). Aunt Edith won by eight lengths from Dark Wave.

=== 1966: four-year-old season ===
Aunt Edith began her four-year-old season at York in May, where she won the Yorkshire Cup very easily by four lengths from the double Ascot Gold Cup winner Fighting Charlie.

In June, Aunt Edith started odds-on favourite for the Hardwicke Stakes over one and a half miles at Royal Ascot but finished unplaced behind Prominer. A month later, Aunt Edith contested the King George VI and Queen Elizabeth Stakes over the same course and distance. Queen Elizabeth II was among the crowd for the race which was named in honour of her parents. Ridden by Lester Piggott, Aunt Edith started at odds of 7/2 against four opponents. She became the first female to win the race as she defeated the Irish Derby winner Sodium by half a length with Prominer two lengths further back in third and the American horse Hill Rise in fourth.

On her only subsequent appearance, Aunt Edith finished eighth behind Bon Mot in the Prix de l'Arc de Triomphe.

== Assessment ==
Timeform rated Aunt Edith at 128 in 1965, and 126 in 1966. In both years she was the highest-rated filly in Europe.

== Stud record ==
At the end of her racing career, Aunt Edith was sold for $185,000 to Ogden Phipps and was exported to the United States. She had some success as a broodmare, producing My Great Aunt who won the Prix de Psyché and the Prix de Flore in 1973. Aunt Edith's produced her last recorded foal in 1981 and died in 1986.

== Pedigree ==
Pedigree of Aunt Edith (GB), chestnut mare, 1962
Sire Primera (IRE) 1954	My Babu; 1945	Djebel	Tourbillon
Sire Primera (IRE) 1954	My Babu; 1945	Djebel	Loika
Sire Primera (IRE) 1954	My Babu; 1945	Perfume	Badruddin
Sire Primera (IRE) 1954	My Babu; 1945	Perfume	Lavendula
Sire Primera (IRE) 1954	Pirette; 1943	Deiri	Aethelstan
Sire Primera (IRE) 1954	Pirette; 1943	Deiri	Desra
Sire Primera (IRE) 1954	Pirette; 1943	Pimpette	Town Guard
Sire Primera (IRE) 1954	Pirette; 1943	Pimpette	Arpette
Dam Fair Edith (GB) 1947	Hyperion; 1930	Gainsborough	Bayardo
Dam Fair Edith (GB) 1947	Hyperion; 1930	Gainsborough	Rosedrop
Dam Fair Edith (GB) 1947	Hyperion; 1930	Selene	Chaucer
Dam Fair Edith (GB) 1947	Hyperion; 1930	Selene	Serenissima
Dam Fair Edith (GB) 1947	Afterthought; 1939	Obliterate	Tracery
Dam Fair Edith (GB) 1947	Afterthought; 1939	Obliterate	Damage
Dam Fair Edith (GB) 1947	Afterthought; 1939	Plack	Hurry On
Dam Fair Edith (GB) 1947	Afterthought; 1939	Plack	Groat (Family:11-f)
