= Mr Mulligan (horse) =

Irish-bred Thoroughbred racehorse

- Racing silks of Michael & Geraldine Worcester
- Sire: Torus
- Grandsire: Ribero
- Dam: Miss Manhattan
- Damsire: Bally Joy
- Sex: Gelding
- Foaled: 25 April 1988
- Country: Ireland
- Colour: Chestnut
- Breeder: J Rowley
- Owner: Michael & Geraldine Worcester
- Trainer: Kim Bailey; Noel Chance
- Record: 12: 7-2-0 (NH Rules)
- Earnings: £212,552

Major wins
- Towton Novices' Chase (1996); Reynoldstown Novices' Chase (1996); Cheltenham Gold Cup (1997)

Mr Mulligan (15 April 1988 – 28 June 1999) was an Irish-bred, British-trained Thoroughbred racehorse. He was a specialist steeplechaser who ran twelve times and won seven races under National Hunt rules. After mixed success in Point-to-point, Mr Mulligan rose to prominence by winning five successive races of increasing importance in the 1995/1996 National Hunt season. He became known for his front-running style and occasionally erratic jumping. In the following year he appeared to have lost his form before recording an upset win over a strong field in the 1997 Cheltenham Gold Cup. He was retired after being injured in training in 1998. Eighteen months later he died after being injured in a paddock accident.

== Background ==
Mr Mulligan was a chestnut horse with a broad white blaze bred by James Rowley of Clifton Lodge. He was sired by Torus out of the mare Miss Manhattan. When Rowley died in 1991 his bloodstock was sold and the four-year-old gelding was sent to the Tattersalls Ireland sales in February 1992 where was sold for 1,700 guineas. Mr Mulligan was later bought privately for £18,000 by Michael Worcester.

Mr Mulligan was a huge, awkward-looking horse. Richard Edmondson in The Independent wrote that he was "no oil painting, rather something a child might produce on the kitchen table with crayon", while the horse's owner described him as "a great orange thing". Mr Mulligan appeared almost useless in training: according to Noel Chance, who trained him to his greatest success, he was an exceptionally lazy animal who only showed his best in a competitive race.

== Racing career ==
=== Point-to-point racing ===
Before running under official National Hunt rules, Mr Mulligan competed in Ireland on the amateur Point-to-point circuit. In early 1994, the six-year-old failed to complete the course in his first three attempts. He fell at Punchestown, "slipped up" at Cashel and unseated his rider in a race at Summerhill. On 8 May he finally showed some promise, winning a three-mile event for maidens at Nenagh in County Tipperary by a distance (more than thirty lengths).

Mr Mulligan was then sent to England to be trained professionally by Kim Bailey. In November 1994 Mr Mulligan had his first race under rules when he ran in a Novice chase at Newbury Racecourse. He went into a clear lead despite several jumping mistakes, but stumbled and fell at the eleventh fence. Mr Mulligan sustained a serious neck injury in the fall and did not race again for ten months.

=== 1995/1996 season: novice chasing ===
Mr Mulligan's absence following his failure at Newbury meant that he began the 1995/1996 season as a novice, never having won a race under National Hunt rules. He was now trained by Noel Chance, who had become Worcester's private trainer at the Folly House stable in Lambourn. Mr Mulligan was ridden in five of his six races that season by Richard Johnson. He began in a Novices' hurdle race at Uttoxeter Racecourse in September. He led from the start and pulled away from the field to win by fifteen lengths, despite being eased by Johnson in the closing stages. A month later he won a similar event at Wetherby, leading from the start and coming home thirteen lengths clear of Rye Crossing.

In November, Mr Mulligan returned to larger obstacles for a Novice steeplechase at Bangor-on-Dee Racecourse. He was so far clear of the opposition at the finish, that his rider, Mark Dwyer, was able to walk the horse over the line and still win by more than thirty lengths. In January, Mr Mulligan was promoted to Grade II class for the Towton Novices' Chase at Wetherby, in which he was matched against the David Nicholson-trained Call It A Day, who started favourite. Mr Mulligan took an early lead, turned back the challenge of Call It A Day, and drew away to win by fifteen lengths. In the Reynoldstown Novices' Chase a month later, Mr Mulligan faced St Mellion Fairway, another Nicholson runner who had won his last three races, and the Jenny Pitman-trained Nahthen Lad. The field appeared to be the strongest assembled for a novice chase up to that point in the season. Johnson sent Mr Mulligan into the lead from the start and the gelding was never seriously challenged, winning by fifteen lengths from Nahthen Lad. The future Grand National winner Lord Gyllene was beaten more than forty lengths in fifth.

Mr Mulligan's run of five victories made him an obvious choice for the Sun Alliance Chase at the Cheltenham Festival in March, and he was made 11/8 favourite. He made a bad mistake at the first fence and another at the eleventh. He reached the lead on the second circuit of the course but when challenged by Nahthen Lad at the last fence he weakened quickly and was beaten eight lengths.

=== 1996/1997 season: steeplechasing ===
Competing against experienced chasers in the 1996/1997 season, Mr Mulligan's first two runs were disappointing. He was made 2/1 favourite for the Rehearsal Handicap Chase at Chepstow despite carrying top weight of 166 pounds. A new jockey, David Bridgwater, was unable to improve his jumping as Mr Mulligan made two serious errors and finished fourth of the seven runners behind Belmont King. Tony McCoy took over the ride in the King George VI Chase at Kempton Park on Boxing Day, but after running well for much of the way, the gelding fell when in second place at the last fence. Mr Mulligan returned from the race with a grapefruit-sized hematoma on his back which was slow to heal and put the rest of his season in doubt. The horse spent three weeks in the care of Mary Bromiley, an equine physiotherapist, before returning to Chance to be prepared for the Cheltenham Gold Cup. Twelve days before the race, the horse was sent to Newbury racecourse for an exercise gallop, where, according to Chance, he "worked appallingly, badly even for him." A better piece of work a week later convinced the trainer to send him to Cheltenham.

Mr Mulligan's erratic performances and disrupted preparation saw him sent off a 20/1 outsider in the Gold Cup on 13 March. The field appeared to be a strong one, with the 1996 winner Imperial Call starting favourite ahead of One Man, Dorans Pride, Danoli, Nahthen Lad and Barton Bank. McCoy had Mr Mulligan among the leaders from the start before sending him to the front just after half way in the three and a quarter mile race. Mr Mulligan made a mistake at the fourth-last fence, but went clear of the field at the next and ran on strongly to win by nine lengths from Barton Bank and Dorans Pride.

=== 1997/1998 season: steeplechasing ===
Mr Mulligan made his first appearance since his Gold Cup win when he ran in the Desert Orchid Chase at Wincanton Racecourse in October. He finished second to Gales Cavalier, who was carrying thirteen pounds less than the champion. In November, Mr Mulligan was sent to Scotland for the Sean Graham Handicap Chase at Ayr Racecourse. The opposition was not strong and Mr Mulligan started at odds of 1/6 despite conceding at least twenty-one pounds to his opponents. He made two bad mistakes but still won comfortably by three lengths.

== Retirement ==
In early 1998 Mr Mulligan injured a tendon in training. Rather than have the horse fired and prepared for a comeback, Worcester decided to end the horse's career on a winning note and Mr Mulligan was retired from racing.

Mr Mulligan was sent to spend his retirement at Worcester's Home Farm at Thornbury, near Bristol. On 28 June 1999 Mr Mulligan was kicked by another horse and sustained a serious fracture to his left foreleg. The injury proved untreatable and the horse was quickly euthanized. On hearing the news a tearful Chance said "I owe everything to that horse" and described Mr Mulligan as "a wonderfully brave chaser".Michael Worcester said that Mr Mulligan had been thriving in retirement and that the horse's death was "desperately sad".

== Pedigree ==
Pedigree of Mr Mulligan (IRE), chestnut gelding, 1988
Sire Torus (GB) 1976	Ribero; 1965	Ribot	Tenerani
Sire Torus (GB) 1976	Ribero; 1965	Ribot	Romanella
Sire Torus (GB) 1976	Ribero; 1965	Libra	Hyperion*
Sire Torus (GB) 1976	Ribero; 1965	Libra	Weighbridge
Sire Torus (GB) 1976	Lighted Lamp; 1967	Sir Gaylord	Turn-To
Sire Torus (GB) 1976	Lighted Lamp; 1967	Sir Gaylord	Somethingroyal
Sire Torus (GB) 1976	Lighted Lamp; 1967	Chandelier	Goyama
Sire Torus (GB) 1976	Lighted Lamp; 1967	Chandelier	Queen of Light
Dam Miss Manhattan (GB) 1972	Bally Joy; 1961	Ballymoss	Mossborough
Dam Miss Manhattan (GB) 1972	Bally Joy; 1961	Ballymoss	Indian Call
Dam Miss Manhattan (GB) 1972	Bally Joy; 1961	Gladness	Sayajirao*
Dam Miss Manhattan (GB) 1972	Bally Joy; 1961	Gladness	Bright Lady
Dam Miss Manhattan (GB) 1972	Sunbow; 1961	Beau Sabreur	His Highness*
Dam Miss Manhattan (GB) 1972	Sunbow; 1961	Beau Sabreur	Mashaq
Dam Miss Manhattan (GB) 1972	Sunbow; 1961	Saturnia	Sayajirao*
Dam Miss Manhattan (GB) 1972	Sunbow; 1961	Saturnia	Ringtime* (Family 6-f)

* Mr Mulligan is inbred 4S x 5D x 5D to the stallion Hyperion, meaning that he appears fourth generation once on the sire side of his pedigree and fifth twice (via His Highness and Ringtime) on the dam side of his pedigree.

* Mr Mulligan is inbred 4D x 4D to the stallion Sayajirao, meaning that he appears fourth generation twice on the dam side of his pedigree.
