= Ragusa (horse) =

Irish-bred Thoroughbred racehorse

- Sire: Ribot
- Grandsire: Tenerani
- Dam: Fantan II
- Damsire: Ambiorix
- Sex: Stallion
- Foaled: 1960
- Country: Ireland
- Colour: Bay
- Breeder: Harry F. Guggenheim
- Owner: James R. and Meg Mullion
- Trainer: Paddy Prendergast
- Record: 12: 7-1-2
- Earnings: US$421,147 (equivalent)

Major wins
- Irish Derby (1963); King George VI and Queen Elizabeth Stakes (1963); Great Voltigeur Stakes (1963); St. Leger Stakes (1963); Eclipse Stakes (1964)

Awards
- Timeform rating: 137; Timeform top-rated three-year-old (1963)
- Last updated on 19 May 2023

Ragusa (1960–1973) was an Irish Thoroughbred racehorse who won five top-class races in 1963–64.

== Background ==
Ragusa was a bay horse bred by Harry Frank Guggenheim. He was sired by Ribot, who was standing in Italy when Guggenheim sent his mare Fantan to be covered in 1959. The mare proved very difficult to get "in foal" and did not conceive until 15 June, well after the usual breeding season had finished. Ragusa was a small and weak foal who needed to be hand fed on milk and eggs, and Guggenheim decided to sell him. At the Ballsbridge Sales in September 1961, Ragusa was sold for 3,800 guineas, to Paddy Prendergast on behalf of James R. Mullion and Meg Mullion of the Ardenode stud in County Kildare, Ireland.

== Racing career ==
=== 1962: two-year-old season ===
Ragusa made his first racecourse appearance in October 1962 at the Curragh where he won the Suir Maiden Plate over seven furlongs.

=== 1963: three-year-old season ===
On his first appearance of the 1963 season, Ragusa was sent to England, where he started favourite for the Dee Stakes at Chester Racecourse but finished second to My Myosotis. In June, he started a 25/1 outsider for the Derby at Epsom and exceeded expectations by finishing third of the twenty-six runners behind Relko and Merchant Venturer.

At the Curragh later that month, Ragusa won the Irish Derby by two and a half lengths after Relko was withdrawn at the start. In July, Ragusa started at odds of 4/1 in a field of ten runners for Britain's most prestigious all-aged race, he King George VI and Queen Elizabeth Stakes at Ascot. He won by four lengths from the four-year-old Miralgo. At York Racecourse in August, he defeated the 2000 Guineas winner Only for Life in the Great Voltigeur Stakes at odds of 2/5. At Doncaster Racecourse in September, Ragusa started the 2/5 favourite for the St Leger and won in a canter by six lengths.

=== 1964: four-year-old season ===
Ragusa began his third season by winning the Ardenode Stakes at Naas, then ran third in the Royal Whip Stakes at the Curragh. In July, he returned to England and won the Eclipse Stakes by one and a half lengths from Baldric. On his final racecourse appearance, he finished unplaced in the Prix de l'Arc de Triomphe.

== Stud career ==
Ragusa was retired from racing to become a breeding stallion in Ireland. The best of his progeny included Morston, Ragstone, Caliban (Coronation Cup), and Homeric. Ragusa died in 1973.

== Sire line tree ==
- Ragusa
  - Caliban
  - Homeric
  - Ballymore
    - Ore
    - Exdirectory
    - Seymour Hicks
      - See More Business
    - Call Collect
  - Morston
    - Whitstead
    - More Light
    - Morcon
  - Ragstone
    - Fingal's Cave
    - Ra Nova

== Pedigree ==
Pedigree of Ragusa (IRE), brown stallion, 1960
Sire Ribot (ITY)	Tenerani (ITY)	Bellini	Cavaliere d'Arpino
Sire Ribot (ITY)	Tenerani (ITY)	Bellini	Bella Minna
Sire Ribot (ITY)	Tenerani (ITY)	Tofanella	Apelle
Sire Ribot (ITY)	Tenerani (ITY)	Tofanella	Try Try Again
Sire Ribot (ITY)	Romanella (ITY)	El Greco	Pharos*
Sire Ribot (ITY)	Romanella (ITY)	El Greco	Gay Gamp
Sire Ribot (ITY)	Romanella (ITY)	Barbara Burrini	Papyrus
Sire Ribot (ITY)	Romanella (ITY)	Barbara Burrini	Bucolic
Dam Fantan (USA)	Ambiorix (FR)	Tourbillon	Ksar
Dam Fantan (USA)	Ambiorix (FR)	Tourbillon	Durban
Dam Fantan (USA)	Ambiorix (FR)	Lavendula	Pharos*
Dam Fantan (USA)	Ambiorix (FR)	Lavendula	Sweet Lavender
Dam Fantan (USA)	Red Eye (USA)	Petee-Wrack	Wrack
Dam Fantan (USA)	Red Eye (USA)	Petee-Wrack	Marguerite
Dam Fantan (USA)	Red Eye (USA)	Charred Keg	Stimulus
Dam Fantan (USA)	Red Eye (USA)	Charred Keg	Jug of Wine (Family: 9)

* Ragusa is inbred 4S x 4D to the stallion Pharos, meaning that he appears fourth generation on the sire side of his pedigree and fourth generation on the dam side of his pedigree.
