= Ribocco =

American-bred Thoroughbred racehorse

- Sire: Ribot
- Grandsire: Tenerani
- Dam: Libra
- Damsire: Hyperion
- Sex: Stallion
- Foaled: 23 March 1964
- Country: United States
- Colour: Bay
- Breeder: Margaret Hager Rogers
- Owner: Charles W. Engelhard, Jr.
- Trainer: Fulke Johnson Houghton
- Record: 14: 5-3-3
- Earnings: £155,669

Major wins
- Observer Gold Cup (1966); Washington Singer Stakes (1966); Irish Derby Stakes; St. Leger Stakes (1967)
- Last updated on July 26, 2008

Ribocco (foaled 1964 in Kentucky) was an American-bred British-trained Thoroughbred racehorse and sire. He is best known for his performances in 1967 when he won two of the most important European races for three-year-olds; the Irish Derby and the St Leger. Ribocco briefly held the record for prize money won by a British-trained racehorse.

== Background ==
Ribocco was a small, powerfully built bay horse bred at the Idle Hour Farm in Paris, Kentucky by Mrs J. G. (Margaret) Rogers. As a yearling, he was sent to the Keeneland sales where he was bought for $35,000 by Charles W. Engelhard, Jr. He was a son of the undefeated dual Prix de l'Arc de Triomphe winner Ribot out of the mare Libra. Libra won one minor race before becoming a notable broodmare, producing Ribero (Irish Derby, St Leger) and Libra's Rib (Princess of Wales's Stakes). Ribocco was sent to England to be trained by Fulke Johnson Houghton at Blewbury in Berkshire.

== Racing career ==
=== 1966: two-year-old career ===
Ribocco made his racecourse debut in July when he won a maiden race at Newbury and returned to the same course a month later to win the Washington Singer Stakes. In September, he was moved up in class to contest the Champagne Stakes at Doncaster and finished second to the Irish-bred Bold Lad. On his final start of the year, Ribocco returned to Doncaster for the Observer Gold Cup, Britain's most valuable race for two-year-olds. He established himself as one of the best colts of his generation with a win. In the Free Handicap, an end-of-season ranking of the best British two-year-olds, Ribocco ranked third behind Bold Lad and Royal Palace.

=== 1967: three-year-old season ===
In the spring of 1967, Ribocco did not win. He was well beaten in the Craven Stakes, the Dee Stakes, and the Lingfield Derby Trial. His odds for the Derby drifted out despite the booking of Britain's leading jockey, Lester Piggott, to ride him in the race.

At Epsom, Ribocco started at odds of 22/1 in a field of twenty-two runners. Piggott held the colt up in the early stages before moving him to the wide outside on the turn into the straight. Ribocco ran on strongly to challenge for the lead a furlong from the finish and take second place, beaten two and a half lengths by the favourite, Royal Palace. Later in the month, Ribocco started favourite for the Irish Derby at the Curragh in front of a crowd of 60,000 which included the visiting Jackie Kennedy. He produced a strong finish to overtake Sucaryl inside the final furlong and win by a length. At Ascot in July, Ribocco started favourite for Britain's most important weight-for-age race, the King George VI and Queen Elizabeth Stakes. He finished third, beaten three lengths and a neck by the four-year-olds Busted and Salvo.

Ribocco was then aimed at the third leg of British Triple Crown series, the St Leger at Doncaster. In a prep race in August, he finished third to Dart Board in the March Stakes at Goodwood. In the St Leger, he started 7/2 joint favourite with the Queen's colt Hopeful Venture. Piggott sent Ribocco into the lead in the straight, and he won, beating Hopeful Venture by one and a half lengths. In October, he was sent to compete in France in that country's most prestigious race where he finished third in the Prix de l'Arc de Triomphe, beaten in a three-way photo finish by the 82/1 winner, Topyo, and Salvo. In his final race, Ribocco returned to the land of his birth and finished seventh in the Washington, D.C. International.

== Assessment and achievements ==
Ribocco's prize money for finishing third in the Arc de Triomphe took his earnings to £155,669, passing the record for a British or Irish racehorse set by Santa Claus in 1964. His place at the top of the list was short-lived as he was overtaken by Royal Palace in the summer of 1968.

== Stud record ==
Ribocco was retired at the end of the 1967 racing season. American Thomas Mellon Evans acquired a part interest in him for breeding purposes. He stood at stud at Evans' Buckland Farm in Virginia, where he met with modest success as a sire, with the best of his progeny including Ripon (John B. Campbell Handicap). After the 1972 breeding season, he was sent to a stud farm in Japan.

== Pedigree ==
Pedigree of Ribocco (USA), bay stallion, 1964
Sire Ribot (GB) 1952	Tenerani; 1944	Bellini	Cavaliere d’Arpino
Sire Ribot (GB) 1952	Tenerani; 1944	Bellini	Bella Mina
Sire Ribot (GB) 1952	Tenerani; 1944	Tofanella	Apelle
Sire Ribot (GB) 1952	Tenerani; 1944	Tofanella	Try Try Again
Sire Ribot (GB) 1952	Romanella; 1943	El Greco	Pharos
Sire Ribot (GB) 1952	Romanella; 1943	El Greco	Gay Gamp
Sire Ribot (GB) 1952	Romanella; 1943	Barbara Burrini	Papyrus
Sire Ribot (GB) 1952	Romanella; 1943	Barbara Burrini	Bucolic
Dam Libra (GB) 1956	Hyperion; 1930	Gainsborough	Bayardo
Dam Libra (GB) 1956	Hyperion; 1930	Gainsborough	Rosedrop
Dam Libra (GB) 1956	Hyperion; 1930	Selene	Chaucer
Dam Libra (GB) 1956	Hyperion; 1930	Selene	Serenissima
Dam Libra (GB) 1956	Weighbridge; 1945	Portlaw	Beresford
Dam Libra (GB) 1956	Weighbridge; 1945	Portlaw	Portree
Dam Libra (GB) 1956	Weighbridge; 1945	Golden Way	Gold Bridge
Dam Libra (GB) 1956	Weighbridge; 1945	Golden Way	Adria (Family: 4-c)
