= Right Royal =

French-bred Thoroughbred racehorse

- Sire: Owen Tudor
- Grandsire: Hyperion
- Dam: Bastia
- Damsire: Victrix
- Sex: Stallion
- Foaled: 1958
- Country: France
- Colour: Brown
- Breeder: Elisabeth Couturié
- Owner: Elisabeth Couturié
- Trainer: Etienne Pollet
- Record: 11:8-2-0

Major wins
- Prix de la Salamandre (1960); Grand Critérium (1960); Poule d'Essai des Poulains (1961); Prix Lupin (1961); Prix du Jockey Club (1961); King George VI and Queen Elizabeth Stakes (1961); Prix Henri Foy (1961)

Honours
- British Horse of the Year (1961)

Right Royal (1958–1973) was a French Thoroughbred race horse and sire. He was the best two-year-old in France in 1960 when his wins included the Grand Critérium. He was the dominant three-year-old of his generation in Europe in the spring and summer of 1961, winning the Poule d'Essai des Poulains, Prix du Jockey Club and the King George VI and Queen Elizabeth Stakes. Right Royal was defeated in the Prix de l'Arc de Triomphe and was retired to stud where he had some success as a breeding stallion.

== Background ==
Right Royal was a brown horse bred in France by his owner Elisabeth Couturié. He was sired by The Derby winner Owen Tudor out of Bastia, a mare who never won a race and spent most of her racing career acting as a pacemaker for her more talented stable companion Tahiti, the winner of the 1954 Prix de Diane. Couturié sent her colt into training with Etienne Pollet at Chantilly.

== Racing career ==
=== 1960: two-year-old season ===
Right Royal won three of his four races as a two-year-old. He won the Prix de la Salamandre and the Grand Critérium at Longchamp. At the end of the year he was rated the best colt of his generation in France.

=== 1961: three-year-old season ===
On his first appearance as a three-year-old, Right Royal was beaten in the Prix de Fontainebleau in April, after being given a questionable ride by Roger Poincelet. He then re-established himself as the best colt in France by winning the Poule d'Essai des Poulains, the Prix Lupin and the Prix du Jockey Club. In the Prix du Jockey Club he won by three lengths from Match at odds of 9/5.

In July, Right Royal was sent to England to contest the King George VI and Queen Elizabeth Stakes in which he was matched against the 1960 Epsom Derby winner St. Paddy. Ridden by Roger Poincelet, he started at odds of 6/4 with St Paddy being made the 4/5 favourite in a race run on rain-softened turf. Right Royal tracked St Paddy until the final furlong when he was moved to the outside and easily accelerated past the English champion, winning by three lengths.

In September, Right Royal returned to Longchamp to win the Prix Foy. A month later, in the Prix de l'Arc de Triomphe, Right Royal started favourite, but finished second of the nineteen runners, beaten two lengths by the Italian colt Molvedo.

== Assessment ==
Right Royal was awarded a rating of 135 by Timeform in 1961.

In 1961, the Bloodstock Breeders' Review conducted their third Horse of the Year poll. Right Royal won the award, taking 50% of the votes.

In their book A Century of Champions, John Randall and Tony Morris rated Right Royal the thirty-second best French horse of the 20th Century.

== Stud record ==
Right Royal had some success as a stallion. He sired the 1969 Irish Derby winner Prince Regent and Salvo, who won the Hardwicke Stakes and the Grosser Preis von Baden and finished second in both the King George and the Arc.

== Sire line tree ==
- Right Royal
  - Salvo
  - Ruysdael
  - Rangong
    - Hyperno
    - Ring the Bell
      - Lord Gyllene
  - In The Purple
    - Gold and Black
  - Prince Regent
  - Politico
    - Party Politics
  - Kambalda
    - Miinnehoma
  - Irish

== Pedigree ==
Pedigree of Right Royal, brown stallion, 1958
Sire Owen Tudor 1938	Hyperion; 1930	Gainsborough	Bayardo
Sire Owen Tudor 1938	Hyperion; 1930	Gainsborough	Rosedrop
Sire Owen Tudor 1938	Hyperion; 1930	Selene	Chaucer*
Sire Owen Tudor 1938	Hyperion; 1930	Selene	Serenissima
Sire Owen Tudor 1938	Mary Tudor; 1931	Pharos	Phalaris
Sire Owen Tudor 1938	Mary Tudor; 1931	Pharos	Scapa Flow*
Sire Owen Tudor 1938	Mary Tudor; 1931	Anna Bolena	Teddy
Sire Owen Tudor 1938	Mary Tudor; 1931	Anna Bolena	Queen Elizabeth
Dam Bastia 1951	Victrix; 1934	Kantar	Alcanatra
Dam Bastia 1951	Victrix; 1934	Kantar	Karabe
Dam Bastia 1951	Victrix; 1934	Victory	Swynford
Dam Bastia 1951	Victrix; 1934	Victory	Lineage
Dam Bastia 1951	Barberybush; 1934	Ksar	Bruleur
Dam Bastia 1951	Barberybush; 1934	Ksar	Kizil Kourgan
Dam Bastia 1951	Barberybush; 1934	Pervencheres	Maboul
Dam Bastia 1951	Barberybush; 1934	Pervencheres	Poet's Star (Family: 3-f)

* Right Royal is inbred 4S x 5S to the stallion Chaucer, meaning that he appears fourth generation and fifth generation (via Scapa Flow) on the sire side of his pedigree.
