= Fulke Johnson Houghton =

British racehorse trainer (1940–2025)

Personal information
- Born: 9 May 1940 Cheshire, England
- Died: 13 February 2025 (aged 84)
- Occupation: Trainer

Horse racing career
- Sport: Horse racing
- Career wins: 1,200+

Major racing wins
- British Classic Race wins: St Leger (1967, 1968)

Significant horses
- Romulus, Ribocco, Ribero, Ribofilio, Habitat, Rose Bowl, Ile de Bourbon, Double Form, Tout Seul

Richard Fulke Johnson Houghton (9 May 1940 – 13 February 2025) was a British Thoroughbred racehorse trainer. He trained over 1,200 winners in a career which lasted from 1961 until 2006. The best of his horses included Ribocco, Ribero, Habitat, Rose Bowl, Ile de Bourbon and Double Form.

== Background ==
Johnson Houghton was born on 9 May 1940 in Malpas, Cheshire, to the trainer Gordon Johnson Houghton and his wife Helen. He was named after his mother's twin brother Fulke Walwyn. Johnson Houghton was educated at Eton College before working as an assistant trainer in Britain and France. When Gordon Johnson Houghton died in 1952 Helen took over the Woodway stable at Blewbury in Berkshire but under Jockey Club rules, women were not allowed to hold a training licence. She therefore managed the yard through assistants including Charles Jerdein and Peter Walwyn. When Walwyn set up his own stable in 1961 the 20-year-old Fulke, then working on a cattle farm in Australia, was recalled to England to take over the licence at Woodway.

== Training career ==
At the start of his career, Johnson Houghton was the youngest licensed trainer in Britain. His first major patron was the American businessman Charles Engelhard for whom he trained in the 1960s. In the second year of his training career, he sent out Engelhard's colt Romulus to win the Greenham Stakes, Sussex Stakes and Queen Elizabeth II Stakes. Later in the decade he had further success for Englehard as he trained the brothers Ribocco, Ribero and Ribofilio. The first two both won the Irish Derby and the St Leger whilst Ribofilio won the Dewhurst Stakes before running badly when favourite for the 1969 2000 Guineas: Johnson Houghton maintained that the horse had been "got at" and doped before the race. In the same year Johnson Houghton won a series of top mile races with Habitat.

In the 1970s Johnson Houghton trained the leading sprinters Parsimony (July Cup, Cork and Orrery Stakes) and Double Form as well as the outstanding racemare Rose Bowl. In 1977 he narrowly failed to win The Derby when Hot Grove was beaten in a photo finish by The Minstrel. In the following year Johnson Houghton sent out Ile de Bourbon to record an upset victory in the King George VI and Queen Elizabeth Stakes.

Johnson Houghton had less success in the later half of his career but he continued to train some good horses. He won the Cork and Orrery Stakes with Posada in 1988 and trained Ruling to finish third in two editions of the Champion Hurdle. His last top-class performer was Tout Seul who won the Dewhurst Stakes in 2002.

Johnson Houghton announced his retirement in 2006 after a 45-year training career which saw him win over 1,200 races.

== Personal life and death ==
Johnson Houghton married Gaie Goldsmith, the daughter of trainer John Goldsmith. His daughter Eve took over his stable on his retirement. He died on 13 February 2025, at the age of 84.
