= Yorkshire Cup (horse race) =

Flat horse race in Britain

- Class: Group 2
- Location: York Racecourse; York, England
- Inaugurated: 1927
- Race type: Flat / Thoroughbred
- Sponsor: Boodles
- Website: York

Race information
- Distance: 1m 5f 188y (2,787m)
- Surface: Turf
- Track: Left-handed
- Qualification: Four-years-old and up
- Weight: 9 st 3 lb Allowances; 3 lb for fillies and mares Penalties; 5 lb for Group 1 winners * 3 lb for Group 2 winners* * since 31 August last year
- Purse: £192,200 (2025); 1st: £100,000

Yorkshire Cup
2026
Rahiebb	Al Nayyir	Epic Poet

Previous years
2025
Rebel's Romance	Epic Poet	Sweet William
2024
Giavellotto	Vauban	Gregory
2023
Giavellotto	Eldar Eldarov	Broome
2022
Stradivarius	Thunderous	Tashkhan
2021
Spanish Mission	Santiago	Sir Ron Priestley

2020-2011
2019
Stradivarius	Southern France	Mildenberger
2018
Stradivarius	Desert Skyline	Call To Mind
2017
Dartmouth	Simple Verse	High Jinx
2016
Clever Cookie	Curbyourenthusiasm	Second Step
2015
Snow Sky	Brown Panther	Havana Beat
2014
Gospel Choir	Tac De Boistron	Tiger Cliff
2013
Glen's Diamond	Top Trip	Royal Diamond
2012
Red Cadeaux	Glen's Diamond	Harris Tweed
2011
Duncan	Blue Bajan	Manighar

2010-2001
2010
Manifest	Purple Moon	Wajir
2009
Ask	Blue Bajan	Veracity
2008
Geordieland	Royal And Regal	Samuel
2007
Sergeant Cecil	Geordieland	Bulwark
2006
Percussionist	Sergeant Cecil	Orcadian
2005
Franklins Gardens	Percussionist	Defining
2004
Millenary	Alcazar	Jelani
2003
Mamool	Warrsan	Bollin Eric
2002
Zindabad	Boreas	Jardines Lookout
2001
Marienbard	Samsaam	Eternal Spring

2000-1991
2000
Kayf Tara	Rainbow Ways	Churlish Charm
1999
Churlish Charm	Largesse	Arctic Owl
1998
Busy Flight	Strategic Choice	Persian Punch
1997
Celeric	Mons	Whitewater Affair
1996
Classic Cliche	Strategic Choice	Court Of Honour
1995
Moonax	Parthian Springs	Shambo
1994
Key To My Heart	My Patriarch	Shareek
1993
Assessor	Allegan	Roll A Dollar
1992
Rock Hopper	Sapience	Snurge
1991
Arzanni	Shambo	Teamster

1990-1988
1990
Braashee	Sapience	Top Class
1989
Mountain Kingdom	Zaffaran	Mazzacano
1988
Moon Madness	Lake Erie	Daarkom

The Yorkshire Cup is a Group 2 flat horse race in Great Britain open to horses aged four years or older. It is run over a distance of 1 mile, 5 furlongs and 188 yards (2,787 metres) at York in May.

== History ==
Formerly a weight-for-age race, the event was revived as a handicap in 1927. It was originally contested over 2 miles. The first running was won by Templestowe.

The Yorkshire Cup was abandoned from 1940 to 1944. A substitute called the Yorkshire Autumn Cup, for horses aged three or older, was staged in 1945.

The event became a conditions race after the war. It temporarily reverted to a handicap in 1951. That year's edition was titled the Yorkshire Stayers' Handicap. Its previous format was restored in 1952.

The race continued with its original distance until 1965. It was cut to 1¾ miles in 1966. It was given Group 2 status in 1971.

The Yorkshire Cup became part of the British Champions Series in 2011. It was the first race in the long-distance division, which concluded with the British Champions Long Distance Cup in October.

The race is currently held on the final day of York's three-day Dante Festival meeting. It is run the day after the Dante Stakes.

== Records ==
Most successful horse (3 wins):

- Stradivarius – 2018, 2019, 2022

Leading jockey (8 wins):

- Lester Piggott – Pandofell (1961), Aunt Edith (1966), Knockroe (1972), Bruni (1976), Bright Finish (1977), Noble Saint (1980), Ardross (1981, 1982)

Leading trainer (7 wins):

- Cecil Boyd-Rochfort – The Scout II (1931), Kingstone (1945), Premonition (1954), Dickens (1960), Sagacity (1962), Raise You Ten (1964), Apprentice (1965)

== Winners ==
Year	Winner	Age	Jockey	Trainer	Time
1927	Templestowe	5	Tommy Weston	Robert Colling	3:21.00
1928	Royal Pom	4	George Baines	Ronald Farquharson	3:27.60
1929	The Consul	4	Willie Stephenson	William Rose Jarvis	3:17.00
1930	The Bastard (Note: The 1930 winner The Bastard was later exported to Australia and renamed The Buzzard)	4	Harry Wragg	Jack Jarvis	3:24.80
1931	The Scout II	4	Joe Childs	Cecil Boyd-Rochfort
1932	Trimdon	6	Joe Childs	Joseph Lawson
1933	Orpen	5	Dick Perryman	Frank Butters
1934	Within-the-Law	5	W. Wells	J. Cannon	3:19.20
1935	Felicitation	5	Freddie Fox	Frank Butters	3:21.60
1936	Valerius	5	Tommy Weston	Joseph Lawson	3:12.80
1937	Silversol	4	Billy Nevett	Matthew Peacock	3:43.40
1938	Suzerain	5	Bill Rickaby	Ted Leader
1939	Finis	4	Harry Wragg	Ossie Bell
	no race 1940–44
1945	Kingstone	3	Doug Smith	Cecil Boyd-Rochfort	3:28.00
1946	Stirling Castle	4	Eph Smith	Joseph Lawson	3:57.40
1947	No Orchids	4	Harry Blackshaw	M. Everitt
1948	Whiteway	4	Bill Evans	Norman Bertie
1949	Woodburn	4	Bill Rickaby	Charles Elsey
1950	Miraculous Atom	6	Billy Nevett	Sam Hall
1951	Orderly Ann	5	A. Carson	Tommy Shedden	3:27.60
1952	Eastern Emperor	4	Bill Rickaby	Jack Jarvis	3:30.20
1953	Childe Harold	4	Jack Brace	Bill Dutton	3:24.80
1954	Premonition	4	Harry Carr	Cecil Boyd-Rochfort	3:22.80
1955	By Thunder!	4	Wally Swinburn	Sam Armstrong	3:56.40
1956	Romany Air	5	Bill Rickaby	Reginald Day	3:29.40
1957	Souverlone	4	Joe Sime	Harry Peacock	3:31.80
1958	Brioche	4	Edgar Britt	Charles Elsey	3:35.40
1959	Cutter	4	Manny Mercer	John Oxley	3:59.60
1960	Dickens	4	Harry Carr	Cecil Boyd-Rochfort	3:28.00
1961	Pandofell	4	Lester Piggott	Freddie Maxwell	3:40.00
1962	Sagacity	4	Harry Carr	Cecil Boyd-Rochfort	3:43.40
1963	Honour Bound	5	Doug Smith	Fred Rimell	3:37.00
1964	Raise You Ten	4	Harry Carr	Cecil Boyd-Rochfort	3:32.00
1965	Apprentice	5	Stan Clayton	Cecil Boyd-Rochfort	3:36.00
1966	Aunt Edith	4	Lester Piggott	Noel Murless	3:21.60
1967	Salvo	4	Ron Hutchinson	Harry Wragg	3:19.00
1968	Sweet Story	6	Jimmy Etherington	Dick Peacock	3:21.40
1969	Quartette	5	Russ Maddock	Tommy Gosling	3:49.00
1970	Rangong	5	Sandy Barclay	Noel Murless	3:01.00
1971	Alto Volante	4	Brian Taylor	Freddie Maxwell	3:00.50
1972	Knockroe	4	Lester Piggott	Peter Nelson	2:55.90
1973	Celtic Cone	6	Greville Starkey	Frank Cundell	2:58.20
1974	Buoy	4	Joe Mercer	Dick Hern	2:56.37
1975	Riboson	4	Joe Mercer	Dick Hern	3:06.71
1976	Bruni	4	Lester Piggott	Ryan Price	3:06.39
1977	Bright Finish	4	Lester Piggott	Jeremy Tree	3:05.93
1978	Smuggler	5	Willie Carson	Dick Hern	2:56.25
1979	Pragmatic	4	John Reid	Fulke Johnson Houghton	3:07.90
1980	Noble Saint	4	Lester Piggott	Robert Armstrong	2:56.03
1981	Ardross	5	Lester Piggott	Henry Cecil	3:08.26
1982	Ardross	6	Lester Piggott	Henry Cecil	2:58.97
1983	Line Slinger	4	Edward Hide	Bill Elsey	3:19.39
1984	Band	4	Willie Carson	Dick Hern	2:57.29
1985	Ilium	4	Richard Hills	Harry Thomson Jones	3:05.42
1986	Eastern Mystic	4	Pat Eddery	Luca Cumani	3:12.26
1987	Verd-Antique	4	Steve Cauthen	Henry Cecil	3:08.89
1988	Moon Madness	5	Pat Eddery	John Dunlop	3:00.51
1989	Mountain Kingdom	5	Steve Cauthen	Clive Brittain	2:52.92
1990	Braashee	4	Michael Roberts	Alec Stewart	2:56.79
1991	Arzanni	4	Frankie Dettori	Luca Cumani	2:57.94
1992	Rock Hopper	5	Pat Eddery	Michael Stoute	2:59.91
1993	Assessor	4	Richard Quinn	Richard Hannon Sr.	2:59.23
1994	Key to My Heart	4	John Reid	Dudley Moffatt	2:55.87
1995	Moonax	4	Pat Eddery	Saeed bin Suroor	2:58.89
1996	Classic Cliche	4	Michael Kinane	Saeed bin Suroor	2:52.77
1997	Celeric	5	Pat Eddery	David Morley	2:59.39
1998	Busy Flight	5	Michael Hills	Barry Hills	3:04.02
1999	Churlish Charm	4	Richard Hughes	Richard Hannon Sr.	3:05.61
2000	Kayf Tara	6	Frankie Dettori	Saeed bin Suroor	2:55.06
2001	Marienbard	4	Frankie Dettori	Saeed bin Suroor	2:57.30
2002	Zindabad	6	Kevin Darley	Mark Johnston	2:54.90
2003	Mamool	4	Frankie Dettori	Saeed bin Suroor	2:52.54
2004	Millenary	7	Richard Quinn	John Dunlop	3:01.61
2005	Franklins Gardens	5	Darryll Holland	Mark Tompkins	3:02.78
2006	Percussionist	5	Darryll Holland	Howard Johnson	3:12.41
2007	Sergeant Cecil	8	Jimmy Fortune	Rod Millman	2:59.63
2008	Geordieland	7	Shane Kelly	Jamie Osborne	3:02.47
2009	Ask	6	Ryan Moore	Sir Michael Stoute	3:05.36
2010	Manifest	4	Tom Queally	Henry Cecil	2:58.99
2011	Duncan	6	William Buick	John Gosden	2:58.33
2012	Red Cadeaux	6	Tom McLaughlin	Ed Dunlop	3:02.89
2013	Glen's Diamond	5	Tony Hamilton	Richard Fahey	3:01.39
2014	Gospel Choir	5	Ryan Moore	Sir Michael Stoute	3:00.36
2015	Snow Sky	4	Ryan Moore	Sir Michael Stoute	2:57.64
2016	Clever Cookie	8	P. J. McDonald	Peter Niven	3:01.12
2017	Dartmouth	5	Ryan Moore	Sir Michael Stoute	3:01.90
2018	Stradivarius	4	Frankie Dettori	John Gosden	2:55.15
2019	Stradivarius	5	Frankie Dettori	John Gosden	3:01.21
	no race 2020 (Note: The 2020 running was cancelled because of the COVID-19 pandemic in the United Kingdom)
2021	Spanish Mission	5	William Buick	Andrew Balding	2:59.56
2022	Stradivarius	8	Frankie Dettori	John & Thady Gosden	2:58.33
2023	Giavellotto	4	Andrea Atzeni	Marco Botti	2:56.79
2024	Giavellotto	5	Oisin Murphy	Marco Botti	2:55.96
2025	Rebel's Romance	7	William Buick	Charlie Appleby	3:07.88
2026	Rahiebb	4	Ray Dawson	Roger Varian	3:00:70

== See also ==
- Horse racing in Great Britain
- List of British flat horse races
