= Morston (horse) =

French-bred, British-trained Thoroughbred racehorse

- Racing silks of Arthur Budgett
- Sire: Ragusa
- Grandsire: Ribot
- Dam: Windmill Girl
- Damsire: Hornbeam
- Sex: Stallion
- Foaled: 1970
- Country: France
- Colour: Chestnut
- Breeder: Park Farm Stud
- Owner: Arthur Budgett
- Trainer: Arthur Budgett
- Record: 2: 2-0-0

Major wins
- Epsom Derby (1973)

Awards
- Timeform rating: 125
- Last updated on 1 September 2022

Morston (1970–1993) was a French-bred, British-trained Thoroughbred racehorse. He is best known for winning the 1973 Derby on his second racecourse appearance. He was then injured, and retired undefeated.

== Background ==
Morston was bred in France by his owner Arthur Budgett's Park Farm Stud. He was sired by the Irish Derby winner Ragusa out of Budgett's mare Windmill Girl. This made him a brother of the 1969 Derby winner Blakeney. He was named after a village in Norfolk.

== Racing career ==
Unraced at two, Morston made his debut in the Godstone Plate, at Lingfield in May 1973. He won comfortably, but showed his inexperience. According to Budgett, the horse was "all over the place".

In the Derby Morston was made a 25-1 outsider. His jockey Edward Hide was instructed by Budgett not to be too hard on the colt, if he was not in a winning position. In the race he hit the front a furlong out and stayed on well to beat Cavo Doro by half a length.

Morston was being trained for the Great Voltigeur Stakes when he suffered a tendon injury which ended his career.

== Assessment ==
Morston has been regarded as one of the least distinguished Derby winners. Writing in the Racing Post, John Randall rated him the worst Derby winner since the Second World War. Budgett, however, regarded Morston as superior to his other Derby winner Blakeney, and the best horse he had ever trained.

He was rated 125 by Timeform.

== Stud career ==
Morston had modest success as a stallion. His best runners were probably Whitstead (Great Voltigeur Stakes), Morcon (Prince of Wales's Stakes) and More Light (Jockey Club Stakes).

== Pedigree ==
Pedigree of Morston (FRA), chestnut stallion, 1970
Sire Ragusa (IRE) 1960	Ribot; 1952	Tenerani	Bellini
Sire Ragusa (IRE) 1960	Ribot; 1952	Tenerani	Tofanella
Sire Ragusa (IRE) 1960	Ribot; 1952	Romanella	El Greco
Sire Ragusa (IRE) 1960	Ribot; 1952	Romanella	Barbara Burrini
Sire Ragusa (IRE) 1960	Fantan; 1952	Ambiorix	Tourbillon
Sire Ragusa (IRE) 1960	Fantan; 1952	Ambiorix	Lavendula
Sire Ragusa (IRE) 1960	Fantan; 1952	Red Eye	Petee-Wrack
Sire Ragusa (IRE) 1960	Fantan; 1952	Red Eye	Charred Keg
Dam Windmill Girl (GB) 1961	Hornbeam; 1953	Hyperion	Gainsborough
Dam Windmill Girl (GB) 1961	Hornbeam; 1953	Hyperion	Selene
Dam Windmill Girl (GB) 1961	Hornbeam; 1953	Thicket	Nasrullah*
Dam Windmill Girl (GB) 1961	Hornbeam; 1953	Thicket	Thorn Wood
Dam Windmill Girl (GB) 1961	Chorus Beauty; 1952	Chanteur	Chateau Bouscaut
Dam Windmill Girl (GB) 1961	Chorus Beauty; 1952	Chanteur	La Diva
Dam Windmill Girl (GB) 1961	Chorus Beauty; 1952	Neberna	Nearco*
Dam Windmill Girl (GB) 1961	Chorus Beauty; 1952	Neberna	Springtime(Family: 20-c)

* Morston is inbred 5D x 4D to the stallion Nearco, meaning that he appears fifth generation (via Nasrullah) and fourth generation on the dam side of his pedigree.
