= T.S. Carlyon Cup =

- Class: Group 3
- Location: Caulfield Racecourse
- Inaugurated: 1977
- Race type: Thoroughbred
- Sponsor: Catanach's Jewellers (2026)

Race information
- Distance: 1,600 metres
- Surface: Turf
- Track: Left-handed
- Qualification: Open
- Weight: Set weights with penalties
- Purse: $200,000 (2026)

The T.S. Carlyon Cup, currently called the MRC Foundation Cup, is a Melbourne Racing Club Group 3 Thoroughbred open horse race run under set weight conditions with penalties over a distance of 1600 metres at Caulfield Racecourse in Melbourne, Australia in February.

== History ==
=== Name ===
- 1977–2000 - T.S. Carlyon Cup
- 2001–2015 - Carlyon Cup
- 2016–2024 - T.S. Carlyon Cup
- 2025 - JRA Plate
- 2026 - MRC Foundation Cup

=== Distance ===
- 1977–1994 – 2000 metres
- 1995 – 1800 metres
- 1996–1997 – 1600 metres
- 1998–2000 – 1800 metres
- 2001–2005 – 1600 metres
- 2006–2010 – 1400 metres
- 2011 onwards - 1600 metres

=== Grade ===
- 1977–1979 - Principal Race
- 1980–2002 - Group 2
- 2003 onwards - Group 3

=== Venue ===
- 1977–1995 - Caulfield Racecourse
- 1996 - Sandown Racecourse
- 1997–2022 - Caulfield Racecourse
- 2023 - Sandown Racecourse

== Winners ==
The following are past winners of the race.

- 2026 - Light Infantry Man
- 2025 - Duke De Sessa
- 2024 - Yonce
- 2023 - Pounding
- 2022 - Earlswood
- 2021 - Best Of Days
- 2020 - Miss Siska
- 2019 - Avilius
- 2018 - Gailo Chop
- 2017 - Burning Front
- 2016 - Burning Front
- 2015 - Smokin' Joey
- 2014 - Chase The Rainbow
- 2013 - Budriguez
- 2012 - Manighar
- 2011 - Lord Pyrus
- 2010 - Rightfully Yours
- 2009 - Time Matters
- 2008 - Publishing
- 2007 - Apache Cat
- 2006 - Live In Vain
- 2005 - Niagara Falls
- 2004 - La Sirenuse
- 2003 - No Deposit
- 2002 - Piper Star
- 2001 - Northerly
- 2000 - Skoozi Please
- 1999 - Thackeray
- 1998 - Delinquent
- 1997 - Peep On The Sly
- 1996 - Toil
- 1995 - Starstruck
- 1994 - Station Hand
- 1993 - Veandercross
- 1992 - Cool Credit
- 1991 - Prince Salieri
- 1990 - Marwong
- 1989 - Super Impose
- 1988 - Black Charleston
- 1987 - Cossack Warrior
- 1986 - The Vagrant
- 1985 - Astrolin
- 1984 - Admiral Lincoln
- 1983 - Trissaro
- 1982 - Granite King
- 1981 - Mr. Independent
- 1980 - There You Go
- 1979 - Marceau
- 1978 - Hyperno
- 1977 - Ngawyni

== See also ==
- List of Australian Group races
- Group races
