= Gran Premio d'Italia =

- Location: San Siro Racecourse; Milan, Italy
- Inaugurated: 1921
- Race type: Flat / Thoroughbred
- Website: San Siro

Race information
- Distance: 2,400 metres (1½ miles)
- Surface: Turf
- Track: Right-handed
- Qualification: Three-year-olds exc. G1 winners this year
- Weight: 56½ kg Allowances; 1½ kg for fillies Penalties; 3½ kg for G1 / G2 winners * 2½ kg if G1 / G2 placed * 2½ kg for G3 winners * 2½ kg if two Listed wins * 1½ kg if G3 placed * 1½ kg if one Listed win * * within last year
- Purse: €44,000 (2018); 1st: €24,450

The Gran Premio d'Italia is a flat horse race in Italy open to three-year-old thoroughbreds. It is run at Milan over a distance of 2,400 metres (about 1½ miles), and it is scheduled to take place each year in June.

== History ==
The event was established in 1921, and it was initially contested over 1,800 metres. It was run over 2,000 metres in 1926 and 1927, and extended to 2,400 metres in 1928.

The present system of race grading was introduced in the early 1970s, and for a period the Gran Premio d'Italia was classed at Group 1 level. During the late 1980s and early 1990s it took place in September.

The race was downgraded in 1996, and cut to 2,000 metres in 1997. From this point it held Listed status and was staged in June or July, although the IFHA website wrongly gives it a Group 2 status. Finally, it lose Listed status in 2025.

The Gran Premio d'Italia was run over 2,200 metres in 2009. It was increased to 2,400 metres in 2010.

== Records ==
Leading jockey since 1984 (3 wins):

- Fernando Jovine – Jaunty Jack (1997), Clapham Common (1998), Endless Hall (1999)
- Mirco Demuro – Sopran Glaumix (2001), Primary (2006), Rastignano (2008)
- Dario Vargiu - Fisich (2002), Bertinoro (2014), Chestnut Honey (2019)

Leading trainer since 1984 (9 wins):

- Stefano Botti – Apprimus (2009), Kidnapping (2010), Bacchelli (2011), Wild Wolf (2012), Bertinoro (2014), Time Chant (2015), Full Drago (2016), Aethos (2017), Henry Mouth (2018)

Leading owner since 1984 (3 wins):

- Dioscuri SRL - Bertinoro (2014), Full Drago (2016), Henry Mouth (2018)

== Winners since 1984 ==
Year	Winner	Jockey	Trainer	Owner	Time
1984	Welnor	A. Marcialis	Gaetano Benetti	Scuderia Concarena	2:38.70
1985	St Hilarion	Greville Starkey	Guy Harwood	Athos Christodoulou	2:27.90
1986	El Cuite	Steve Cauthen	Henry Cecil	Sheikh Mohammed	2:39.40
1987	Ibn Bey	Richard Quinn	Paul Cole	Fahd Salman	2:25.60
1988	Welsh Guide	Vittorio Panici	Michael Jarvis	L. Monaldi	2:31.20
1989	Yellow King	Gianfranco Dettori	Alduino Botti	Scuderia Siba	2:29.80
1990	Dashing Blade	Brian Rouse	Ian Balding	Jeff Smith	2:29.20
1991	Pigeon Voyageur	Thierry Jarnet	André Fabre	Paul de Moussac	2:30.00
1992	Masad	Frankie Dettori	Luca Cumani	Gabriella Zanocchio	2:30.00
1993	Right Win	John Reid	Richard Hannon, Sr.	Conal Kavanagh	2:28.70
1994	Close Conflict	John Reid	Peter Chapple-Hyam	Robert Sangster	2:36.60
1995	Posidonas	Richard Hughes	Paul Cole	Athos Christodoulou	2:33.00
1996	Toto le Moko	Marco Monteriso	Alberto Verdesi	Gerecon Italia	2:38.30
1997	Jaunty Jack	Fernando Jovine	Luca Cumani	M. Marchetti	2:11.20
1998	Clapham Common	Fernando Jovine	Luca Cumani	Anglia Bloodstock 1996	2:04.00
1999	Endless Hall	Fernando Jovine	Gianfranco Verricelli	Scuderia Blueberry	2:01.50
2000	Shibuni's Falcon	Marco Monteriso	Maurizio Guarnieri	Scuderia Athena	2:02.80
2001	Sopran Glaumix	Mirco Demuro	Bruno Grizzetti	Scuderia Belforte	2:07.10
2002	Fisich	Dario Vargiu	Alduino Botti	Scuderia Rencati	2:04.10
2003	Winning Dash	Edmondo Botti	Wilfried Kujath	Stall Zorbas	2:05.30
2004	Electrocutionist	Edmondo Botti	Valfredo Valiani	Earle Mack	2:02.80
2005	Tedo	Silvano Mulas	Bruno Grizzetti	Scuderia Il Poggio	2:02.30
2006	Primary	Mirco Demuro	William Haggas	Highclere XXVI	2:00.30
2007	Estejo	Daniele Porcu	Ralf Rohne	Giovanne Martone	2:05.20
2008	Rastignano	Mirco Demuro	Vincenzo Caruso	Scuderia Miragrigna	2:09.20
2009	Apprimus	Silvano Mulas	Stefano Botti	Carla Donnini	2:16.90
2010	Kidnapping	Fabio Branca	Stefano Botti	Scuderia Effevi	2:30.80
2011	Bacchelli	Umberto Rispoli	Stefano Botti	Scuderia Nordovest	2:27.70
2012	Wild Wolf	Fabio Branca	Stefano Botti	Scuderia Effevi	2:28.10
2013	Demeteor	Luca Maniezzi	Riccardo Menichetti	Razza Del'Olmo	2:30.20
2014	Bertinoro	Dario Vargiu	Stefano Botti	Dioscuri Srl	2:32.80
2015	Time Chant	Cristian Demuro	Stefano Botti	Sandro Cardaioli	2:29.50
2016	Full Drago	Umberto Rispoli	Stefano Botti	Dioscuri Srl	2:32:80
2017	Aethos	Silvano Mulas	Stefano Botti	We Bloodstock	2:32.00
2018	Henry Mouth	Cristian Demuro	Stefano Botti	Dioscuri Srl	2:27.50
2019	Chestnut Honey	Dario Vargiu	Alessandro Botti	Scuderia Effevi	2:29.10

== Earlier winners ==
- 1921: Michelangelo
- 1922: Fiorello
- 1923: Duccia di Buoninsegna
- 1924: Giambologna
- 1925: Lui
- 1926: Cranach
- 1927: Varedo
- 1928: Delleana
- 1929: Ortello
- 1930: Sciacca
- 1931: Salpiglossis
- 1932: Velite
- 1933: Pilade
- 1934: Navarro
- 1935: Jacopo da Pontormo
- 1936: Archidamia / Ettore Tito *
- 1937: Donatello
- 1938: Nearco
- 1939: Maenio
- 1940: Moroni
- 1941: Niccolo dell'Arca
- 1942: Scire
- 1943: Orsenigo
- 1944: Torbido
- 1945: Traghetto
- 1946: Gladiolo
- 1947: Tenerani
- 1948: Trevisana
- 1949: Golfo
- 1950: Fiorillo
- 1951: Nuccio
- 1952: Iroquois
- 1953: Toulouse Lautrec
- 1954: Botticelli
- 1955: Theodorica
- 1956: Tissot
- 1957: Braque
- 1958: Sedan
- 1959: Exar
- 1960: Marguerite Vernaut
- 1961: Nuria
- 1962: Antelami
- 1963: Osmarin
- 1964: Maxim
- 1965: Accrale
- 1966: Serov
- 1967: Ruysdael
- 1968: Teston
- 1969: Bonconte di Montefeltro
- 1970: Ortis
- 1971: Weimar
- 1972: Tierceron
- 1973: Prince Ippi
- 1974: Ribecourt
- 1975: Laomedonte
- 1976: Art Style / Red Arrow *
- 1977: Wale
- 1978: Sortingo
- 1979: Maria Waleska
- 1980: Pareo
- 1981: Kirtling
- 1982: Oui Mon Capitaine
- 1983: Celio Rufo

* The 1936 and 1976 races were dead-heats and have joint winners.

== See also ==
- List of Italian flat horse races
