= Papyrus (horse) =

Irish-bred Thoroughbred racehorse

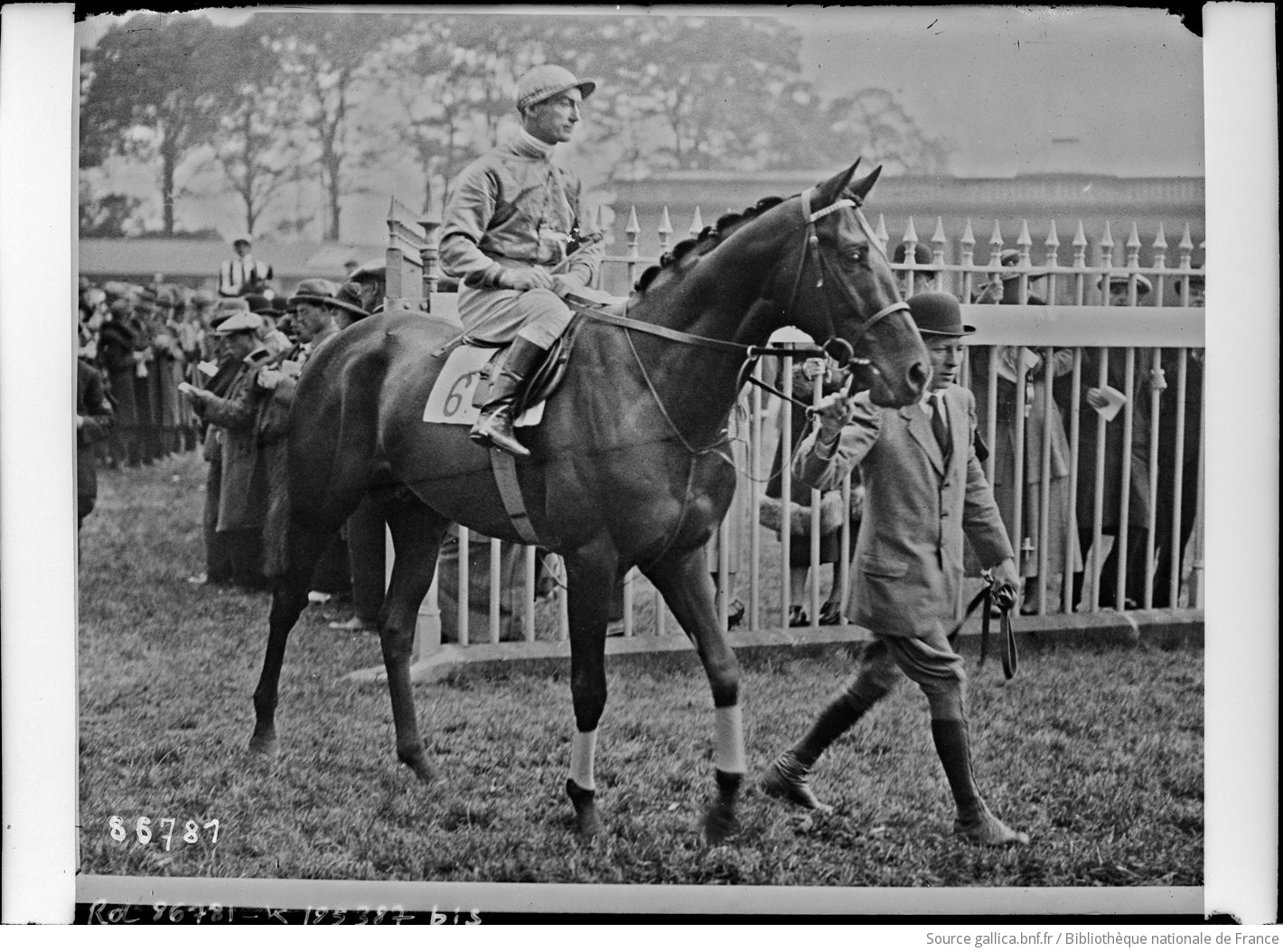
- September 1923
- Sire: Tracery
- Grandsire: Rock Sand
- Dam: Miss Matty
- Damsire: Marcovil
- Sex: Stallion
- Foaled: 1920
- Country: United Kingdom of Great Britain and Ireland
- Colour: Brown
- Breeder: Sir John Robinson
- Owner: Benjamin Irish; John Peter Hornung
- Trainer: Basil Ernest Jarvis
- Record: 18: 9-4-1
- Earnings: £17,868

Major wins
- Chester Vase (1923); Epsom Derby (1923)
- Last updated on August 27, 2008

Papyrus (1920–1941) was a British Thoroughbred racehorse and sire. In a career that lasted from spring 1922 to October 1924, he ran eighteen times and nine races. He was a leading two-year-old in 1922 and, in the following year, he gained his most important success when he won The Derby. Later that season, he gained international attention when he was sent to New York for an unsuccessful match race against the Kentucky Derby winner Zev. This was the earliest example of a British horse being sent across the Atlantic for a single race. After running four times without winning, in 1924, he was retired to stud, where he had limited success until his death in 1941.

== Background ==
Papyrus a medium-sized brown horse "of fine quality" with a white star, was bred by Sir John Robinson at the Worksop Manor Stud in Nottinghamshire. He was sired by the American-bred Tracery, a son of Rock Sand who was sent to Britain to race following the passing of the Hart–Agnew Law and whose wins included the 1912 St Leger. He later became a highly successful sire, with his best runners, apart from Papyrus, including The Panther (2000 Guineas) and Transvaal (Grand Prix de Paris). Tracery was exported to Argentina but was returned to England following Papyrus's Derby victory. Papyrus's dam, Miss Matty, never won a race, but produced several other winners at stud.

As a yearling, Papyrus was put up for auction at the Doncaster Sales, where he was sold for 3,500 guineas to the trainer Basil Jarvis on behalf of Benjamin Irish, a wealthy farmer. Irish was considered a "lucky" owner as he had great success despite owning very few racehorses. Jarvis trained the colt at Newmarket, Suffolk.

== Racing career ==
=== 1922: two-year-old season ===
Papyrus was quick to mature and won six of his eight races as a two-year-old in 1922. His two defeats came in the New Stakes at Royal Ascot when he was beaten four lengths by Lord Woolavington's Town Guard and the Champagne Stakes at Doncaster when he ran poorly behind Drake. In his final start of the season, he ran against Town Guard again in the Criterion Stakes at Newmarket. Lord Woolavington's colt had won his last six races and was regarded as the best two-year-old of the season, but Papyrus produced his best performance of the year to reverse the Ascot form and win decisively. Papyrus's win was considered a "fluke" by some observers, but he went into the winter break disputing favouritism for the following year's Derby with Town Guard.

=== 1923: three-year-old season ===
Papyrus began his three-year-old season in the 2000 Guineas at Newmarket on 2 May. Although he was short of peak fitness he ran creditably to finish fourth behind Ellangowan and retained his position as favourite for the Derby. Two weeks later he was sent to Chester Racecourse where he started even money favourite for the Chester Vase over the Derby distance of one and a half miles, and won "in a canter" by three lengths from Triumph.

At Epsom, Papyrus started at odds of 100/15 (approximately 6.7/1) in a field of nineteen runners for the Derby, with Town Guard starting favourite at 5/1, the two colts having headed the betting lists since the previous autumn. On a cold, dull and misty day, which led to the race being dubbed the "overcoat Derby" the race attracted a crowd estimated at 250,000, with the Royal Family represented by the Prince of Wales. Ridden by Steve Donoghue, Papyrus took the lead on the turn into the straight. Two furlongs from the finish he was challenged and headed by Pharos, but responded well and showed good stamina to regain the advantage and win by a length after what was described as a "desperate and prolonged duel". Parth finished third after losing a great deal of ground at the start and Town Guard was unplaced. The win gave Donoghue a "hat-trick" of Derby wins, following Humorist in 1921 and Captain Cuttle in 1922.

On 19 August, it was announced that Irish had accepted a challenge to run Papyrus against "the best American horse" for a prize of £4,000. Later that month the American Jockey Club announced that the race would take place on 20 October and that the prize would be $100,000, with a consolation prize of $2,000 for the beaten horse. The Kentucky Derby winner Zev was eventually selected as the American representative on 6 October. Papyrus's first race after the Derby was the Duke of York Stakes at York on 28 August. He was beaten a short-head by the front-running Craigelyr, but was awarded the race after Donoghue lodged an objection against the winner on the grounds of "boring". Less than two weeks later Papyrus started favourite for the St Leger at Doncaster. He took the lead in the straight and got the better of a prolonged struggle with Parth, but was caught in the closing stages and beaten by Lord Derby's filly Tranquil. During the race Papyrus was "struck into" by another horse and returned bleeding freely from several cuts to his legs, one of which narrowly missed a tendon.

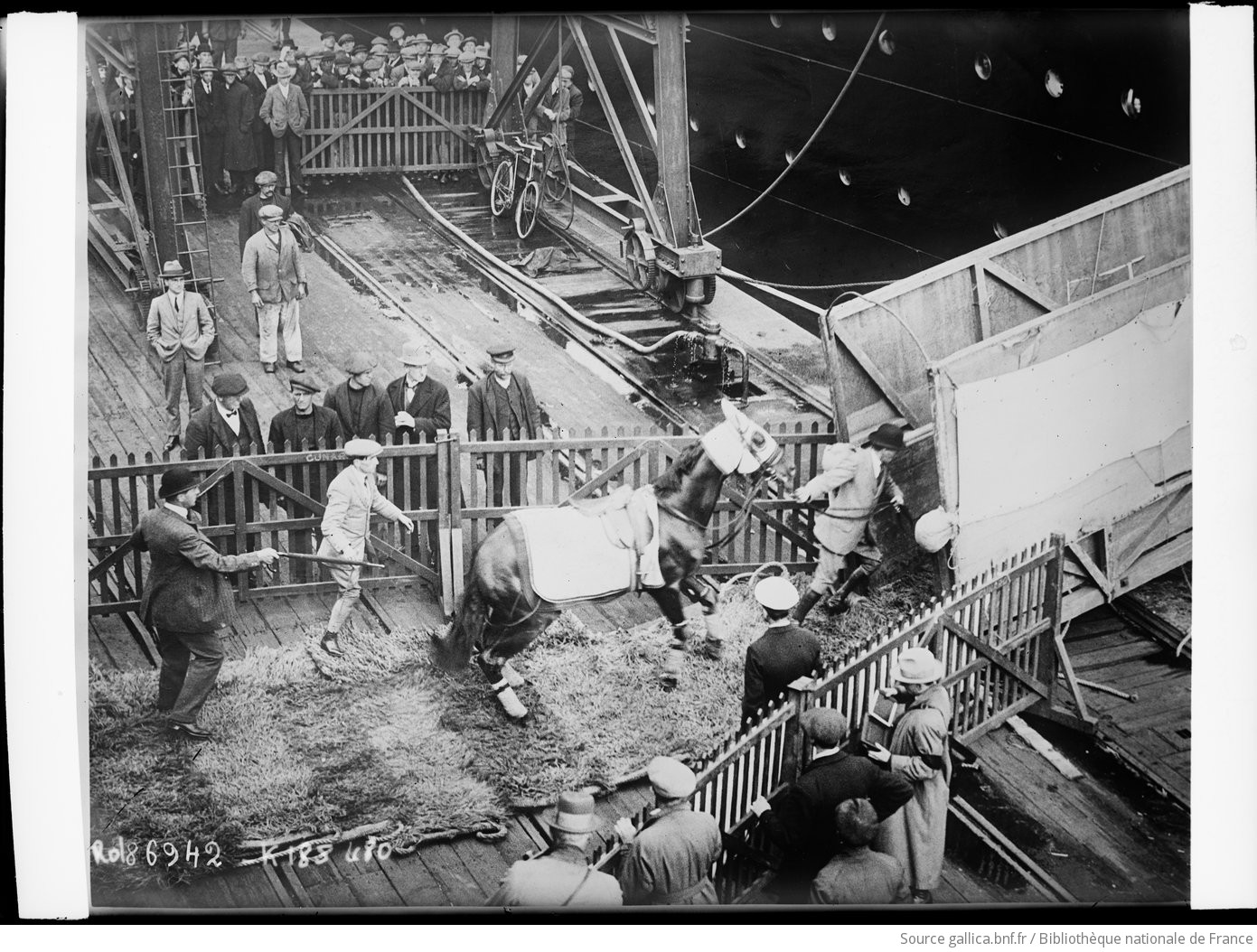
Papyrus boarding the RMS Aquitania for America (21 September 1923).

Immediately after the St Leger, Papyrus was sent to the United States for his previously arranged match race with Zev. He was shipped by ocean vessel with his own special feed mix, his stablemate Bargold, his stable cat, two stable boys, his trainer, and his jockey, Steve Donoghue. Despite these special arrangements many British commentators felt that the race was futile, with the effects of the sea-voyage and the change in environment making Papyrus's task almost impossible. Racing on a dirt track for the first time and in heavy mud at Belmont Park, Papyrus lost by five lengths in front of a crowd of 70,000. He wore ordinary smooth racing plates, whereas his rival was equipped with specially adapted "mud caulks" to cope with the sloppy conditions. Terms of the match were to allow Zev to come upsides the Derby champion. Donoghue did, but Zev soon kicked on and Papyrus was unable to make any impression in the closing stages. Although stating that Papyrus had failed to cope with the conditions, Jarvis acknowledged that he had been fairly beaten by a better horse.

At the end of the season, Irish sold Papyrus for £35,000 to John Hornung.

=== 1924: four-year-old season ===
Papyrus stayed in training at four, but failed to win a race in four attempts, leading one observer to claim that he was "not half the horse he was". although he did put up good performances in defeat. On his first appearance, he was beaten by Poisoned Arrow in a race over one and a half miles. At Royal Ascot he looked fit in the paddock before the two and a half mile Gold Cup but finished unplaced behind the French-trained winner Massine. In the Eclipse Stakes on 18 July, he finished second, two lengths behind the three-year-old Polyphontes and three lengths clear of the other six starters. It was expected that Papyrus would be retired after this race, but he returned for a final appearance at Newmarket in autumn. On 2 October, he ran second, by half a length, to the filly Teresina in Jockey Club Stakes, with Parth in third.

== Stud record ==
Papyrus was retired to his owner's West Grinstead Stud in Sussex, where he stood at an initial fee of 300 guineas. He sired some good winners but was not a great success. Hornung later turned down an offer for Papyrus from the Polish Jockey Club and, on his death in 1940, passed the horse by will to Basil Jarvis. Papyrus died in his box in early November 1941.

Papyrus sired Osiris, who won several stakes races in England, then stood at stud in Canada, where he was the leading sire in 1938, 1940, 1942 and 1947. Papyrus was the damsire of Princequillo who in turn sired some important thoroughbreds – the damsire of Secretariat and his rival Sham. Other descendants include Shergar. He is a progenitor of Zenyatta, through Princequillo.

== Pedigree ==
Pedigree of Papyrus (GB), brown stallion, 1920
Sire Tracery (USA) 1909	Rock Sand (GB); 1900	Sainfoin	Springfield
Sire Tracery (USA) 1909	Rock Sand (GB); 1900	Sainfoin	Sanda
Sire Tracery (USA) 1909	Rock Sand (GB); 1900	Roquebrune	St Simon
Sire Tracery (USA) 1909	Rock Sand (GB); 1900	Roquebrune	St. Marguerite
Sire Tracery (USA) 1909	Topiary (GB); 1901	Orme	Ormonde
Sire Tracery (USA) 1909	Topiary (GB); 1901	Orme	Angelica
Sire Tracery (USA) 1909	Topiary (GB); 1901	Plaisanterie	Wellingtonia
Sire Tracery (USA) 1909	Topiary (GB); 1901	Plaisanterie	Poetess
Dam Miss Matty (GB) 1914	Marcovil (GB); 1903	Marco	Barcaldine
Dam Miss Matty (GB) 1914	Marcovil (GB); 1903	Marco	Novitiate
Dam Miss Matty (GB) 1914	Marcovil (GB); 1903	Lady Villikins	Hagioscope
Dam Miss Matty (GB) 1914	Marcovil (GB); 1903	Lady Villikins	Dinah
Dam Miss Matty (GB) 1914	Simonath (GB); 1905	St Simon	Galopin
Dam Miss Matty (GB) 1914	Simonath (GB); 1905	St Simon	St Angela
Dam Miss Matty (GB) 1914	Simonath (GB); 1905	Philomath	Philammon
Dam Miss Matty (GB) 1914	Simonath (GB); 1905	Philomath	Chrysalis (Family:16-f)
