= Fantastic Light =

American-bred Thoroughbred racehorse

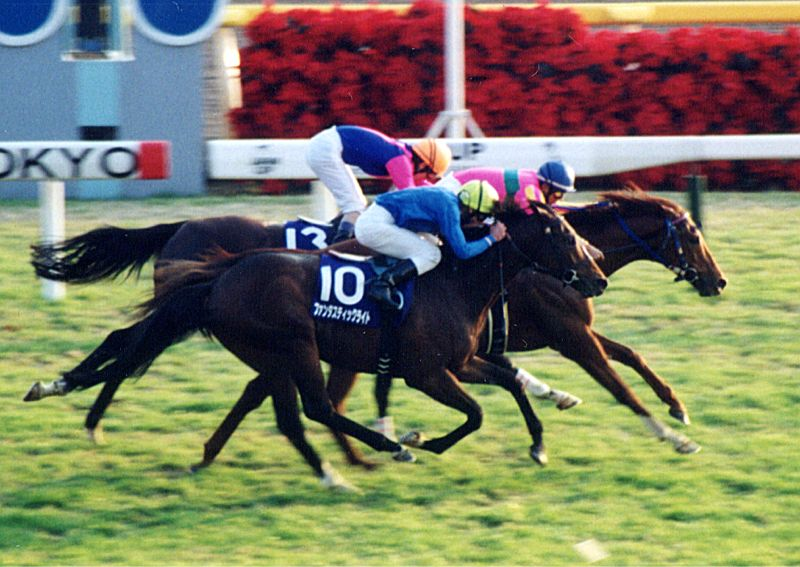
- Japan Cup 2000. Fantastic Light (No. 10) finishes third to T. M. Opera O
- Sire: Rahy
- Grandsire: Blushing Groom
- Dam: Jood
- Damsire: Nijinsky
- Sex: Stallion
- Foaled: 1996
- Country: United States
- Colour: Bay
- Breeder: Gainsborough Farm Inc.
- Owner: Maktoum bin Rashid Al Maktoum; Godolphin Stables
- Trainer: Michael Stoute; Saeed bin Suroor
- Record: 25: 12-5-3
- Earnings: $8,486,957

Major wins
- Sandown Classic Trial (1999); Great Voltigeur Stakes (1999); Arc Trial (1999); Dubai Sheema Classic (2000); Man o' War Stakes (2000); Hong Kong Cup (2000); Tattersalls Gold Cup (2001); Prince of Wales's Stakes (2001); Irish Champion Stakes (2001); Breeders' Cup Turf (2001)

Awards
- United States Champion Male Turf Horse (2001); European Champion Older Horse (2001); European Horse of the Year (2001); Emirates World Series Racing Champion (2000, 2001); Timeform rating: 134
- Last updated on August 20, 2024

Fantastic Light (foaled on 13 February 1996) is a Thoroughbred racehorse and sire. He was foaled in the United States but was trained in England and Dubai during his racing career, which ran from August 1998 to his retirement following the Breeders' Cup Turf in October 2001. He raced in seven countries, winning Group One/Grade I races in five of them and was a dual winner of the Emirates World Series Racing Championship. He was named United States Champion Male Turf Horse, European Horse of the Year and European Champion Older Horse in 2001. He was also well known for his two races against the 2001 Epsom Derby winner Galileo. In August 2012 it was announced that he had been pensioned from stallion duty while in Japan and would return to Dalham Hall in England to live out his days as a pensioner.

In his early racing career, when trained by Michael Stoute, he won the Sandown Classic Trial, the Great Voltigeur Stakes, the Arc Trial and the Dubai Sheema Classic. In 2000 after his transfer to Godolphin he won the Man o' War Stakes and the Hong Kong Cup. In his championship season in 2001 Fantastic Light won four of his six races; the Tattersalls Gold Cup, the Prince of Wales's Stakes, the Irish Champion Stakes and the Breeders' Cup Turf.

== Background ==
Fantastic Light, a bay horse with an irregular white blaze and three white feet, was bred in Kentucky by Maktoum Al Maktoum's Gainsborough Stud.

His sire, Rahy (1985–2011), sired the winners of over three hundred races, including more than thirty at Group One/Grade I level. Apart from Fantastic Light, his best progeny have included Noverre, Serena's Song and Hawksley Hill. Fantastic Light's dam, Jood, a daughter of Nijinsky, failed to win a race, but came from a good family, being closely related to Swain.

Until early 2000, Fantastic Light raced in the colours of Maktoum Al Maktoum and was trained by Michael Stoute at Newmarket, Suffolk. His ownership was then transferred to Godolphin Racing, and he was trained from that point on by Saeed bin Suroor.

== Racing career ==
=== 1998: two-year-old season ===
Fantastic Light never ran in a maiden race, instead making his debut against more experienced colts in a minor stakes race at Sandown in August 1998. He started slowly and showed his inexperience ("ran green") before taking the lead in the closing stages and winning by one and three quarter lengths from Sicnee, with the future Diadem Stakes winner, Sampower Star in third. He followed up in a similar event at the same course three weeks later, beating Aesops by three quarters of a length after leading close to the finish. This performance attracted some attention, with one commentator identifying him as "a promising young stayer". On his last start of the year he was moved up to Listed class, and finished last of the three starters in the Stardom Stakes at Goodwood.

=== 1999: three-year-old season ===
Fantastic Light began his three-year-old season with his first Group race win in the Sandown Classic Trial. Ridden by Daryll Holland, he took the lead a furlong out and was eased in the closing stages to win by a short head. Speculation that he might develop into a Derby contender ended in his next race, when he was stepped up to one and a half miles for the first time and finished fourth of the five runners in the Lingfield Derby Trial.

Fantastic Light was brought back to a mile and a quarter, and produced placed efforts on his next two starts. At Royal Ascot in June, he was beaten a head by Lear Spear in the Prince of Wales's Stakes (then a Group Two race), and at Sandown three weeks later he finished third, beaten a neck and half a length behind Compton Admiral and Xaar in the Group One Eclipse Stakes. In August Fantastic Light recorded his first win at Group Two level as he led three furlongs out and ran on to win a strongly contested Great Voltigeur Stakes from Bienamado (Hollywood Turf Cup Stakes, San Juan Capistrano Handicap, Charles Whittingham Memorial Handicap) and the future St Leger winner Mutafaweq. A month later, he won a third important race by holding off the 1998 Epsom Derby winner High-Rise by three quarters of a length in the Listed Arc Trial at Newbury.

On his final start of the season, Fantastic Light was moved up to the highest level for the Prix de l'Arc de Triomphe and finished a remote eleventh of the thirteen runners behind Montjeu.

=== 2000: four-year-old season ===
Godolphin racing colours, carried by Fantastic Light from April 2000.

Fantastic Light's first run of 2000 was also his last for the Stoute stable. He was sent to Dubai for the Sheema Classic, in which he faced a field including runners from Britain, France, Germany, Japan, New Zealand and Argentina. Ridden by Kieren Fallon, he took the lead in the straight ("far too soon" according to his jockey) and went clear to beat the German horse Caitano by three lengths, with High-Rise third. In winning, Fantastic Light broke the Nad Al Sheba track record for one and a half miles by more than a second. Shortly after the race it was announced that Fantastic Light would not return to Michael Stoute, but would be transferred to Sheikh Mohammed's Godolphin Racing team and be trained by Saeed bin Suroor.

Fantastic Light was then returned to England for a summer campaign. In the Coronation Cup at Epsom in June he finished second to Daliapour and then came fifth of the eight runners behind Giant's Causeway in the Eclipse Stakes. He was then sent to Ascot for the King George VI and Queen Elizabeth Stakes, where he finished second, reversing the Epsom form with Daliapour, but having no chance against the favourite Montjeu.

In Autumn, Godolphin campaigned Fantastic Light in the United States. At Belmont Park in September he started odds-on favourite and won the Man o' War Stakes "comfortably", to record his first Grade I victory. In this race he was ridden by Jerry Bailey, who claimed that he had always had the other runners "at his mercy" despite having to come round the outside of the field. In all his remaining ten starts Fantastic Light was ridden by Frankie Dettori. He disappointed in a return to Belmont for the Turf Classic, finishing fourth to John's Call, a horse he had beaten in the Man o' War. He then finished to fifth Kalanisi in the Breeders' Cup Turf at Churchill Downs, although in this case he had a legitimate excuse, having been blocked twice when Dettori attempted to find space for a challenge.

For his last two starts of the year, Fantastic Light was sent to East Asia. In November, in the Japan Cup he stayed on strongly in the closing stages to finish a close third, beaten a neck and a nose by T. M. Opera O and Meisho Doto. Dettori reportedly felt that the slow pace was the reason for his defeat. Despite three successive defeats, Fantastic Light still managed to end the season with a major victory. In December he was sent to Sha Tin for the Hong Kong Cup and justified favouritism by leading in the straight and staying on strongly to beat Greek Dance and Jim and Tonic. The win earned Fantastic Light top place in the Emirates World Series, a competition in which points were awarded for performances in a number of international races.

=== 2001: five-year-old season ===
==== Spring ====
In March he attempted to win a second Sheema Classic and almost succeeded, taking the lead a furlong out, but being caught on the line and beaten a nose by the Japanese outsider Stay Gold. Despite the defeat, his connections announced that they were "delighted" with the performance. As in 2000, Fantastic Light spent the middle of the season racing in Europe. At the end of May he was sent to Ireland where he won the Tattersalls Gold Cup, taking the lead a furlong from the finish and beating Golden Snake by a neck with Kalanisi third. After the race, Godolphin's racing manager, Simon Crisford, said that Fantastic Light would be aimed at the top middle-distance races in Europe, calling him "very special... a fantastic horse".

==== Summer ====
Despite this result, Kalanisi was made favourite when the horses met again in the Prince of Wales's Stakes (by this time a Group One race) at Royal Ascot, a contest that was expected to be one of the best of the meeting. Fantastic Light raced behind the leaders before being moved up by Dettori to take the lead in the straight. He soon went clear with what The Daily Telegraph described as a "ruthless display of speed", and although Kalanisi attempted to challenge, Fantastic Light stayed on to win "comfortably" by two and a half lengths. After the race, Sheikh Mohammed talked confidently about a meeting with the unbeaten Derby winner Galileo.

Fantastic Light and Galileo did meet at Ascot in the King George VI and Queen Elizabeth Stakes, for which the Aidan O'Brien-trained three-year-old was sent off the 1/2 favourite ahead of Fantastic Light at 7/2. The race was the subject of considerable advance publicity, and was portrayed as a clash between the two most powerful forces in European racing; Godolphin, represented by Fantastic Light, and Ballydoyle/Coolmore represented by Galileo. As in the Prince of Wales's Stakes, Dettori settled Fantastic Light in the early stages before moving him out to challenge in the straight. Galileo had already taken the lead but Fantastic Light moved up and went level a furlong out. The two horses raced side by side for several strides, but Galileo then pulled ahead to win by two lengths.

==== Autumn ====
The second meeting between Fantastic Light and Galileo was scheduled for the Irish Champion Stakes at Leopardstown in September and was highly anticipated. This time Dettori rode Fantastic Light more positively as part of an agreed Godolphin plan, sending him past the Ballydoyle pacemaker to take the lead two furlongs out. Michael Kinane immediately brought Galileo to challenge and the two horses raced alongside each other all the way to the line. Galileo appeared to gain a slight advantage, but Fantastic Light, stayed on strongly under pressure to regain the lead and win by a head in a "thrilling" contest. The British Horseracing Authority described the event as "one of the greatest races witnessed throughout the current decade", whilst readers of the Racing Post placed it seventh (the third highest for a flat race) in their list of the 100 Greatest Races.

For Fantastic Light's final start, he was sent back to America for a second attempt at the Breeders' Cup, held in October 2001 at Belmont Park. It was expected that he would run against Galileo again in the Classic, while Godolphin's Prix de l'Arc de Triomphe winner, Sakhee was aimed for the Breeders' Cup Turf. Shortly before the race, however, the two Godolphin horses switched targets, the rationale apparently being that Sakhee would be better suited by the dirt surface. In the Turf, Dettori placed Fantastic Light just behind the pace as the race was led first by With Anticipation and then by Timboroa. Making his challenge in the straight, Fantastic Light took the lead just over a furlong out and held off the strong late challenge of the St Leger winner Milan to win by three quarters of a length, with the rest of the runners more than five lengths further back. The time of 2:24.36 was a new course record. Summarising Fantastic Light's career, Crisford called him "the ultimate modern-day racehorse."

A projected run in the Japan Cup did not materialise and his retirement was announced shortly afterwards. He had already amassed sufficient points to secure a second Emirates World Series.

== Race record ==
The following chart is retrieved from Racing Post.

Date	Race	Dist (f)	Course	Class	Prize (£K)	Odds	Runners	Placing	Margin	Time	Jockey	Trainer	Winner (2nd Place)
2 August 1998	Carshalton Novice Stakes	7	Sandown		4	8/1	5	1	1.75	1:33.35	John Reid	Michael Stoute	(Sicnee)
22 August 1998	Sun Conditions Stakes	8	Sandown		4	7/2	5	1	0.75	1:44.02	John Reid	Michael Stoute	(Aesops)
11 September 1998	Stardom Stakes	8	Goodwood	Listed	13	9/4	3	3	2.5	1:44.70	Ray Cochrane	Michael Stoute	Mutaahab
24 April 1999	Sandown Classic Trial	10	Sandown	3	39	13/2	7	1	Short head	2:15.73	Darryll Holland	Michael Stoute	(Dehoush)
8 May 1999	Lingfield Derby Trial	12	Lingfield	3	32	3/1	5	4	6.75	2:30.31	Darryll Holland	Michael Stoute	Lucido
15 June 1999	Prince of Wales's Stakes	10	Ascot	2	88	14/1	8	2	Head	2:04.37	Gary Stevens	Michael Stoute	Lear Spear
3 July 1999	Eclipse Stakes	10	Sandown	1	174	6/1	8	3	0.75	2:06.42	Gary Stevens	Michael Stoute	Compton Admiral
17 August 1999	Great Voltigeur Stakes	12	York	2	57	4/1	7	1	1.25	2:29.05	Gary Stevens	Michael Stoute	(Bienamado)
19 September 1999	Arc Trial	11	Newbury	Listed	28	9/4	6	1	0.75	2:21.51	Kieren Fallon	Michael Stoute	（High-Rise）
3 October 1999	Prix de l'Arc de Triomphe	12	Longchamp	1	538	33/1	14	11	29	2:38.50	John Reid	Michael Stoute	Montjeu
25 March 2000	Dubai Sheema Classic	12	Nad Al Sheba	3	731		16	1	3	2:27.70	Kieren Fallon	Michael Stoute	(Caitano)
9 June 2000	Coronation Cup	12	Epsom	1	150	7/4	4	2	0.75	2:41.83	Chris McCarron	Saeed bin Suroor	Daliapour
8 July 2000	Eclipse Stakes	10	Sandown	1	216	5/1	8	5	6.25	2:05.32	John Reid	Saeed bin Suroor	Giant's Causeway
29 July 2000	King George VI and Queen Elizabeth Stakes	12	Ascot	1	435	12/1	7	2	1.75	2:29.98	John Reid	Saeed bin Suroor	Montjeu
9 September 2000	Man o' War Stakes	11	Belmont	1	182	13/20	8	1	1	2:17.44	Jerry Bailey	Saeed bin Suroor	(Ela Athena)
7 October 2000	Turf Classic Invitational	12	Belmont	1	274	7/5	12	4	3.5	2:28.58	Frankie Dettori	Saeed bin Suroor	John's Call
4 November 2000	Breeders' Cup Turf	12	Churchill Downs	1	786	119/10	13	5	2	2:26.96	Frankie Dettori	Saeed bin Suroor	Kalanisi
26 November 2000	Japan Cup	12	Tokyo	1	1504	79/10	16	3	0.25	2:26.10	Frankie Dettori	Saeed bin Suroor	T. M. Opera O
17 December 2000	Hong Kong Cup	10	Sha Tin	1	628	19/10	14	1	1.75	2:02.20	Frankie Dettori	Saeed bin Suroor	(Greek Dance)
24 March 2001	Dubai Sheema Classic	12	Nad Al Sheba	2	800	7/4	16	2	Nose	2:28.23	Frankie Dettori	Saeed bin Suroor	Stay Gold
27 May 2001	Tattersalls Gold Cup	10.5	The Curragh	1	100	5/4	6	1	Neck	2:13.40	Frankie Dettori	Saeed bin Suroor	(Golden Snake)
20 June 2001	Prince of Wales's Stakes	10	Ascot	1	145	100/30	9	1	2.5	2:04.40	Frankie Dettori	Saeed bin Suroor	(Kalanisi)
28 July 2001	King George VI and Queen Elizabeth Stakes	12	Ascot	1	435	7/2	12	2	2	2:27.71	Frankie Dettori	Saeed bin Suroor	Galileo
8 September 2001	Irish Champion Stakes	10	Leopardstown	1	384	9/4	7	1	Head	2:01.80	Frankie Dettori	Saeed bin Suroor	(Galileo)
27 October 2001	Breeders' Cup Turf	12	Belmont	1	741	7/5	12	1	0.75	2:24.20	Frankie Dettori	Saeed bin Suroor	(Milan)

== Assessment, honours and awards ==
From the mid-1990s the International Classification Committee (representing Europe) and the North American Rating Committee drew up an annual International Classification which included all horses who raced in Europe, North America and Japan. These ratings did not include Southern Hemisphere horses and were not therefore, "World" rankings.

In the 2000 International Classification, Fantastic Light was assessed at 124, placing him fourteenth in the ratings (eighth in Europe), ten pounds below Dubai Millennium. In the 2001 International Classification Fantastic Light was assessed at 129 (equal with Galileo ), making him the third highest rated horse behind Sakhee and Point Given.

Fantastic Light was assessed at 134 by Timeform. A rating in excess of 130 is given to "the very best horses".

In 2001 he was named European Champion Older Horse and European Horse of the Year at the Cartier Racing Awards.

In February 2002 Fantastic Light was voted the Eclipse Award for American Champion Male Turf Horse in the Eclipse Awards, beating Val Royal and With Anticipation in the voting.

== Stud career ==
Retired at the end of the 2001 racing season, Fantastic Light stood for the Darley Stud stud at Dalham Hall in Newmarket, England, before being moved to their Japanese base in Hokkaido for the 2007 season. He has also been shuttled to stand in Australia for the Southern Hemisphere breeding season. During five seasons at stud in Australia he was the sire of 427 live foals.

He has sired the winners of more than three hundred races including Scintillo, winner of the Winter Derby, the Gran Criterium and the Grand Prix de Chantilly (Group 2). His only other Group 1 winner was Mission Critical who won the New Zealand International Stakes in 2008.

Fantastic Light was pensioned from stud duties in August 2012.

== Pedigree ==
Pedigree of Fantastic Light (USA), bay stallion, 1996
Sire Rahy (USA) 1985	Blushing Groom; 1974	Red God	Nasrullah*
Sire Rahy (USA) 1985	Blushing Groom; 1974	Red God	Spring Run
Sire Rahy (USA) 1985	Blushing Groom; 1974	Runaway Bride	Wild Risk
Sire Rahy (USA) 1985	Blushing Groom; 1974	Runaway Bride	Aimee
Sire Rahy (USA) 1985	Glorious Song; 1976	Halo	Hail To Reason*
Sire Rahy (USA) 1985	Glorious Song; 1976	Halo	Cosmah
Sire Rahy (USA) 1985	Glorious Song; 1976	Ballade	Herbager
Sire Rahy (USA) 1985	Glorious Song; 1976	Ballade	Miss Swapsco
Dam Jood (USA) 1989	Nijinsky; 1967	Northern Dancer	Nearctic*
Dam Jood (USA) 1989	Nijinsky; 1967	Northern Dancer	Natalma
Dam Jood (USA) 1989	Nijinsky; 1967	Flaming Page	Bull Page
Dam Jood (USA) 1989	Nijinsky; 1967	Flaming Page	Flaring Top
Dam Jood (USA) 1989	Kamar; 1976	Key To The Mint	Graustark
Dam Jood (USA) 1989	Kamar; 1976	Key To The Mint	Key Bridge
Dam Jood (USA) 1989	Kamar; 1976	Square Angel	Quadrangle
Dam Jood (USA) 1989	Kamar; 1976	Square Angel	Nangela* (Family: 14-c)

- Although there is no inbreeding visible in the table above, four of the horses in the fourth generation (Narsullah, Hail To Reason, Nearctic and Nangela) are direct descendants of Nearco, who as a result appears twice in the fifth, and twice in the sixth generation of Fantastic Light's extended pedigree.
