= Heart of Darkness (horse) =

British-bred Thoroughbred racehorse

- Sire: Glint of Gold
- Grandsire: Mill Reef
- Dam: Land of Ivory
- Damsire: The Minstrel
- Sex: Stallion
- Foaled: 11 February 1988
- Country: United Kingdom
- Colour: Brown
- Breeder: Paul Mellon
- Owner: Paul Mellon
- Trainer: Ian Balding
- Record: 19: 4-3-1
- Earnings: £139,708

Major wins
- Washington Singer Stakes (1990); National Stakes (1990)

Heart of Darkness (11 February 1988 – 25 May 2011) was a British-bred Thoroughbred racehorse and sire. He showed by far his best form a juvenile in 1990 when he won two of his three races including the Washington Singer Stakes and the National Stakes before his career was interrupted by a serious leg injury. He failed to win again for two years before taking two minor races in the autumn of 1992. He later stood as a breeding stallion in Australia with limited success.

== Background ==
Heart of Darkness was a brown horse bred in England by his owner Paul Mellon. Like many of Mellon's European runners, he was trained throughout his racing career by Ian Balding at Kingsclere in Hampshire.

He was one of the best flat horses sired by Mellon's stallion Glint of Gold who won six Group 1 races as well as finishing second in the Epsom Derby. Heart of Darkness was the first foal of his dam Land of Ivory, a successful racemare who won three races and was placed in both the Lupe Stakes and the Prix Cléopâtre. As a granddaughter of the American broodmare Natashka (foaled 1963), she was closely related to Margarula, Questing, Elusive Quality and Dark Lomond.

== Racing career ==
=== 1990: two-year-old season ===
Heart of Darkness began his career in a maiden race over six furlongs at Goodwood Racecourse on 4 August in which he started at odds of 9/1 and finished fourth of the eight runners, six and a quarter lengths behind the winner Majlood. Thirteen days later he was stepped up in class and distance for the Listed Washington Singer Stakes over seven furlongs at Newbury in which he was ridden, as on his debut by Steve Cauthen. Starting the 11/2 outsider of the four runners, he raced at the rear of the field before accelerating into the lead inside the final furlong and winning by one and a half lengths from the Barry Hills-trained Caerdydd.

The Irish jockey Pat Shanahan took the ride when the colt was sent to Ireland to contest the Group 1 National Stakes over seven furlongs at the Curragh on 8 September. He was made the 7/4 favourite ahead of Malvernico, a Jim Bolger-trained colt who had won both the Curragh Stakes and the Anglesey Stakes. The other six runners included Caerdydd, Poets Dream (from the Vincent O'Brien stable), Prodigal Blues (third in the Chesham Stakes) and Smooth Performance (runner-up in the Orby Stakes). Heart of Darkness tracked the leaders as Malvernico set the pace, but began to make progress inside the last quarter mile. He caught the Bolger colt in the final strides and won by a head, with Prodigal Blues a length away in third place.

Heart of Darkness was being prepared for a run in the Dewhurst Stakes when he fractured a cannon bone in a training gallop.

=== 1991: three-year-old season ===
Heart of Darkness was off the racecourse for over a year before returning for four races in the late autumn of 1991. He finished second in a minor event at Newwbury and then came home sixth in the Listed Main Reef Stakes at Newmarket Racecourse, fading in the closing stages after leading for most of the way. He went on to run second to Susurration in the Darley Stakes and ended his campaign by finishing runner-up to Mohican Girlwhen favourite for the James Seymour Stakes over ten furlongs at Newmarket on 1 November.

=== 1992: four-year-old season ===
In 1992 Heart of Darkness was mainly campaigned in handicap races but had little success for most of the year and finished unplaced in his first eight races. He eventually returned to winning form at Warwick Racecourse on 5 October, taking the seven furlong Queen Bess Stakes "comfortably" by three lengths from the three-year-old Talb. Seventeen day later he followed up by winning a one-mile handicap at Newbury under a weight of 140 pounds. As in his victory at Warwick he was ridden by Ray Cochrane and wore a visor. On his last two starts Heart of Darkness ran third in a handicap at Newmarket and then came home eighth of the twelve runners in the Group 3 Prix Perth at Saint-Cloud Racecourse on 8 November.

== Stud record ==
At the end of his racing career Heart of Darkness was retired to become a breeding stallion in Australia where he sired several minor winners but no top-class performers. He reportedly died at Gundaroo on 25 May 2011 at the age of twenty-three.

== Pedigree ==
Pedigree of Heart of Darkness (GB), brown stallion, 1988
Sire Glint of Gold (GB) 1978	Mill Reef (USA); 1968	Never Bend	Nasrullah
Sire Glint of Gold (GB) 1978	Mill Reef (USA); 1968	Never Bend	Lalun
Sire Glint of Gold (GB) 1978	Mill Reef (USA); 1968	Milan Mill	Princequillo
Sire Glint of Gold (GB) 1978	Mill Reef (USA); 1968	Milan Mill	Virginia Water
Sire Glint of Gold (GB) 1978	Crown Treasure (USA); 1973	Graustark	Ribot
Sire Glint of Gold (GB) 1978	Crown Treasure (USA); 1973	Graustark	Flower Bowl
Sire Glint of Gold (GB) 1978	Crown Treasure (USA); 1973	Treasure Chest	Rough'n Tumble
Sire Glint of Gold (GB) 1978	Crown Treasure (USA); 1973	Treasure Chest	Iltis
Dam Land of Ivory (USA) 1983	The Minstrel (USA); 1974	Northern Dancer	Nearctic
Dam Land of Ivory (USA) 1983	The Minstrel (USA); 1974	Northern Dancer	Natalma
Dam Land of Ivory (USA) 1983	The Minstrel (USA); 1974	Fleur	Victoria Park
Dam Land of Ivory (USA) 1983	The Minstrel (USA); 1974	Fleur	Flaming Page
Dam Land of Ivory (USA) 1983	Ivory Wand (USA); 1973	Sir Ivor	Sir Gaylord
Dam Land of Ivory (USA) 1983	Ivory Wand (USA); 1973	Sir Ivor	Attica
Dam Land of Ivory (USA) 1983	Ivory Wand (USA); 1973	Natashka	Dedicate
Dam Land of Ivory (USA) 1983	Ivory Wand (USA); 1973	Natashka	Natasha (Family: 13-c)
