= Alenquer (horse) =

French Thoroughbred racehorse

- Sire: Adlerflug
- Grandsire: In The Wings
- Dam: Wild Blossom
- Damsire: Areion
- Sex: Colt
- Foaled: 21 February 2018
- Country: France
- Colour: Bay
- Breeder: Gestut Romerhof
- Owner: M M Stables
- Trainer: William Haggas
- Record: 13: 5-2-1
- Earnings: £777,279

Major wins
- Sandown Classic Trial (2021); King Edward VII Stakes (2021); Winter Derby (2022); Tattersalls Gold Cup (2022)

Alenquer (foaled 21 February 2018) is a French-bred, British-trained Thoroughbred racehorse. After showing promise as a juvenile in 2020 he emerged as a top-class middle-distance performer in the following year, winning the Sandown Classic Trial and King Edward VII Stakes as well as finishing second in the International Stakes and Grand Prix de Paris. As a four-year-old he added victories in the Winter Derby and Tattersalls Gold Cup.

== Background ==
Alenquer is a bay colt with a white blaze and white socks on his hind legs bred in France by the German breeding company Gestut Romerhof. As a foal in December 2018 he was consigned to the Arqana Breeding Stock sale at Deauville and was bought for €18,000 by representatives of the bloodstock agency BBA Ireland. In October 2019 the colt was entered in the Tattersalls Yearling Sale at Newmarket where he was purchased for 80,000 guineas by Armando Duarte on behalf of M M Stables. He was sent into training with William Haggas at Somerville Lodge stables in Newmarket.

He was from the eighth crop of foals sired by Adlerflug who won the Deutsches Derby in 2007. His other major winners have included Torquator Tasso, In Swoop (second in the Prix de l'Arc de Triomphe), Iquitos (Grosser Preis von Baden) and Ito (Grosser Preis von Bayern). Alenquer's dam Wild Blossom showed modest racing ability in Germany, winning one minor race from twelve starts. She was descended from the British broodmare Kingscavil, who was a half-sister to the Epsom Oaks winner Neasham Belle.

== Racing career ==
=== 2020: two-year-old season ===
Alenquer was ridden in both of his races as a juvenile by Tom Marquand. He began his track career in a maiden race over seven furlongs on soft ground at Newbury Racecourse on 18 August. Starting at odds of 13/1 in an eleven-runner field he recovered from a poor start to take the lead approaching the final furlong and won "comfortably" by two and three quarter lengths from the favourite Tasfeeq. The colt was then moved up in distance to contest the Listed Ascendant Stakes over one mile at Haydock Park when he started joint-favourite but was beaten into second place by the Richard Hannon Jr.-trained Fancy Man.

=== 2021: three-year-old season ===
On his first run as a three-year-old Alenquer was partnered by Marquand when he contested the Group 3 bet365 Classic Trial over ten furlongs at Sandown Park on 23 April and went off a 25/1 outsider in a ten-runner field which included Lone Eagle (winner of the Zetland Stakes), Adayar, Yibir and Etonian (Solario Stakes). He was among the leaders from the start, gained the advantage two furlongs from the finish and although he "wandered around" in the closing stages he held on to win by half a length and a neck from Adayar and Yibir. After the race Marquand said "Every time he was joined he fought back again. He's certainly not the finished article and he's a really nice horse to go forward with. Realistically speaking he's still quite raw so he's done very well to win that today".

Alenquer had not been entered in the Epsom Derby and a minor injury in May ruled out the possibility of a supplementary entry. Plans for the colt to run in the Deutsches Derby were cancelled owing to COVID-19 restrictions. He returned to the track for the King Edward VII Stakes over 1 1/2 miles on heavy ground at Royal Ascot on 18 June and started the 13/8 favourite against five opponents. After being restrained towards the rear of the field my Marquand he moved up to take the lead approaching the final furlong and "kept on well" to win by 1 1/2 lengths from Tasman Bay. Haggas commented "I think Tom only gave him a couple of flicks because it was heavy ground, but I don’t think he needed to, it looked like he was always going to win. I’m not sure about the St Leger, I think he’s a bit quicker than that but all options are open. He’s not a today horse, he’s very much for the longer term as well so we’ve lots of exciting options.”

On 14 July Alenquer was sent to France and stepped up to Group 1 class for the Grand Prix de Paris over 2400 metres at Longchamp Racecourse where he started the 2.9/1 second choice in the betting. Ridden by James Doyle he raced towards the rear before finishing strongly and came home third behind Hurricane Lane and Wordsworth. Marquand was back in the saddle when Alenquer was matched against older horses for the first time in the International Stakes over 10 1/2 furlongs at York Racecourse. He proved no match for the four-year-old Mishriff but took second place ahead of Love, with Mac Swiney and Alcohol Free finishing fifth and sixth. Alenquer ended his campaign in the Prix de l'Arc de Triomphe over 2400 metres at Longchamp on 3 October. He was in close contention for most of the way before tiring in the straight and coming home ninth behind Torquator Tasso, beaten just under seven lengths by the winner.

=== 2022: four-year-old season ===
Alenquer began his third campaign in the Winter Derby over ten furlongs on the synthetic Polytrack surface at Lingfield Park on 23 February when he was ridden by Cieren Fallon and started 11/4 second favourite behind the six-year-old gelding Lord North. He tracked the front-running Al Zaraqaan before taking the lead two furlongs out and kept on strongly to beat Lord North by 2 1/2 lengths in a track record time of 2:00.51. Armando Duarte commented "He'll improve massively for this race as he was only 80 per cent fit and hopefully this will set him up nicely for the Group 1 targets such as Dubai Sheema Classic or maybe the Prix Ganay. Cieren gave him a perfect ride from a perfect position throughout and I think Alenquer is a Group 1 horse in the making." As Duarte suggested, the colt returned in the Dubai Sheema Classic at Meydan Racecourse in March. He was among the leaders for most of the way and although he came home sixth behind Shahryar he was only 1 1/2 lengths behind the winner.

On 22 May Alenquer was sent to Ireland to contest the Group 1 Tattersalls Gold Cup over 10 1/2 furlongs at the Curragh and started the 7/2 third choice in the betting behind Lord North and State Of Rest in an eight-runner field which also included Mac Swiney, Helvic Dream and Broome. After settling behind the front-running outsider High Definition, Alenquer moved up to join the leader entering the final furlong. High Definition kept on well but Alenquer gained the advantage in the final strides and won by a neck, with State Of Rest finishing strongly to take third. Tom Marquand, who was riding at the track for the first time said "It was great to get this lad in a scrap at the two pole, because there was only one way he was going to come out. Sometimes at home it's a bit of a pain that he loves a fight because he thinks it's all a game, but when he gets on the track he takes it seriously."

== Pedigree ==
Pedigree of Alenquer, bay colt, 2018
Sire Adlerflug (GER) 2004	In the Wings (GB); 1986	Sadler's Wells (USA)	Northern Dancer (CAN)
Sire Adlerflug (GER) 2004	In the Wings (GB); 1986	Sadler's Wells (USA)	Fairy Bridge
Sire Adlerflug (GER) 2004	In the Wings (GB); 1986	High Hawk (IRE)	Shirley Heights (GB)
Sire Adlerflug (GER) 2004	In the Wings (GB); 1986	High Hawk (IRE)	Sunbittern (GB)
Sire Adlerflug (GER) 2004	Aiyana (GER); 1993	Last Tycoon (IRE)	Try My Best (USA)
Sire Adlerflug (GER) 2004	Aiyana (GER); 1993	Last Tycoon (IRE)	Mill Princess
Sire Adlerflug (GER) 2004	Aiyana (GER); 1993	Alya	Lombard
Sire Adlerflug (GER) 2004	Aiyana (GER); 1993	Alya	Anatevka
Dam Wild Blossom (GER) 2012	Areion (GER); 1995	Big Shuffle (USA)	Super Concorde
Dam Wild Blossom (GER) 2012	Areion (GER); 1995	Big Shuffle (USA)	Raise Your Skirts
Dam Wild Blossom (GER) 2012	Areion (GER); 1995	Aerleona (IRE)	Caerleon (USA)
Dam Wild Blossom (GER) 2012	Areion (GER); 1995	Aerleona (IRE)	Alata
Dam Wild Blossom (GER) 2012	Wind In Her Hair (GER); 2002	Turtle Island (IRE)	Fairy King (USA)
Dam Wild Blossom (GER) 2012	Wind In Her Hair (GER); 2002	Turtle Island (IRE)	Sisania (GB)
Dam Wild Blossom (GER) 2012	Wind In Her Hair (GER); 2002	Waitotara (IRE)	Habitat (USA)
Dam Wild Blossom (GER) 2012	Wind In Her Hair (GER); 2002	Waitotara (IRE)	Sagrada (GB) (Family: 21-a)
