= 1982 King George VI and Queen Elizabeth Stakes =

32nd King George VI and Queen Elizabeth Stakes
- King George VI and Queen Elizabeth Stakes
- Location: Ascot Racecourse
- Date: 24 July 1982
- Winning horse: Kalaglow (IRE)
- Jockey: Greville Starkey
- Trainer: Guy Harwood (GB)
- Owner: Tony Ward

The 1982 King George VI and Queen Elizabeth Stakes was a horse race held at Ascot Racecourse on Saturday 24 July 1982. It was the 32nd running of the King George VI and Queen Elizabeth Stakes.

The winner was Tony Ward's Kalaglow, a four-year-old grey colt trained at Pulborough in West Sussex by Guy Harwood and ridden by the British jockey Greville Starkey. Kalaglow's victory was the first in the race for his owner, trainer and jockey. Kalaglow was the first of only two greys to win the race, the other being Daylami in 1999.

== The contenders ==
The race attracted a field of nine runners, five of whom were trained in the United Kingdom, one in France, one in Ireland and one is Israel. The favourite was the Irish-trained Assert, a three-year-old colt who had won both the Prix du Jockey Club by three lengths and the Irish Derby by a margin conservatively estimated as eight lengths. The French challenger was Assert's half-brother Bikala, who had won the Prix du Jockey Club and finished a close second in the Prix de l'Arc de Triomphe in as a three-year-old before winning the Prix Ganay in April 1982. Israel was represented by Dronacharya a son of Nijinsky who had shown no discernable ability as a racehorse. The best of the British runners appeared to be Kalaglow, who had finished behind Bikala in the Prix Ganay but won the Eclipse Stakes by four lengths and Height of Fashion a three-year-old filly who had defeated Ardross in the Princess of Wales's Stakes. The other runners were the six-time Group One winner Glint of Gold, Easter Sun, who had recorded an upset victory over Glint of Gold in the Coronation Cup, the Hardwicke Stakes winner Critique and the 100/1 outsider Lafontaine. Assert headed the betting at odds of 10/11 ahead of Bikala (11/2), Kalaglow (13/2), Height of Fashion (9/1) and Glint of Gold (10/1).

== The race ==
Bikala went to the front shortly after the start and set a very fast pace from Lafontaine with Glint of Gold and Kalaglow close behind. The French colt maintained his advantage into the straight where challengers began to emerge. Assert moved up on the outside of his half-brother whilst Pat Eddery brought Glint of Gold out wider still as Kalaglow made ground along the rail. Assert gained the advantage inside the final quarter mile but was immediately challenged by Glint of Gold on his left and Kalaglow on his right. Kalaglow produced the best finish to take the lead in the final strides and win by a neck from the favourite. Glint of Gold took third ahead of the fast-finishing Critique and the weakening Bikala. There were long gaps back to Easter Sun, Height of Fashion and Lafontaine, with Dronacharya tailed-off in last place.

== Race details ==
- Sponsor: De Beers
- First prize: £126,472
- Surface: Turf
- Going: Good to Firm
- Distance: 12 furlongs
- Number of runners: 9
- Winner's time: 2:31.88

== Full result ==
Pos.	Marg.	Horse (bred)	Age	Jockey	Trainer (Country)	Odds
1		Kalaglow (IRE)	4	Greville Starkey	Guy Harwood (GB)	13/2
2	nk	Assert (IRE)	3	Christy Roche	David O'Brien (IRE)	10/11 fav
3	3	Glint of Gold (GB)	4	Pat Eddery	Ian Balding (GB)	10/1
4	nk	Critique (USA)	4	Lester Piggott	Henry Cecil (GB)	13/1
5	nk	Bikala (IRE)	4	Serge Gorli	Patrick Biancone (FR)	11/2
6	10	Easter Sun (GB)	5	Bruce Raymond	Michael Jarvis (GB)	13/1
7	8	Height of Fashion (FR)	3	Willie Carson	Dick Hern (GB)	9/1
8	2	Lafontaine (USA)	5	Steve Cauthen	Clive Brittain (GB)	100/1
9		Dronacharya (USA)	6	Joe Mercer	A. Netser (ISR)	750/1

* Abbreviations: nse = nose; nk = neck; shd = head; hd = head; dist = distance; UR = unseated rider

== Winner's details ==
Further details of the winner, Kalaglow

- Sex: Colt
- Foaled: 19 February 1978
- Country: Ireland
- Sire: Kalamoun; Dam: Rossitor (Pall Mall)
- Owner: Tony Ward
- Breeder: Someries Stud
