= Protection Racket =

American-bred Thoroughbred racehorse

- Sire: Graustark
- Grandsire: Ribot
- Dam: Protectora
- Damsire: Prologa
- Sex: Stallion
- Foaled: 22 February 1978
- Country: United States
- Colour: Bay
- Breeder: Edward A Seltzer & Alvin Wagner
- Owner: Edward A Seltzer; Serge Fradkoff
- Trainer: Jeremy Hindley; Olivier Douieb; Gary Kempler
- Record: 18: 5-4-2

Major wins
- Ebor Handicap (1981); Doncaster Cup (1981); Irish St Leger (1981)

Awards
- Timeform rating 84 (1980), 122 (1981), 117 (1982)

Protection Racket (22 February 1978 – after 1988) was an American-bred Thoroughbred racehorse and sire. He failed to win in three starts as a two-year-old in 1980 but made relentless progress over extended distances in the following year, taking two minor races before winning the Ebor Handicap, Doncaster Cup and Irish St Leger on his last three starts. He remained in training for two more seasons, racing over shorter distances in France and the United States but never won again. He made no impact as a breeding stallion.

== Background ==
Protection Racket was a "strong, rangy" bay horse with no white markings bred in Kentucky by Edward A Seltzer & Alvin Wagner. He initially raced in Seltzer's colours and was sent to Europe where he was trained by Jeremy Hindley at his Clarehaven Stables in Newmarket.

His sire Graustark had a brief but promising racing career before becoming a very successful breeding stallion whose progeny included Prove Out, Key To The Mint, Avatar and Jim French. Protection Racket's dam Protectora was a top-class racemare in Chile before moving to the United States where she won the Nettie Handicap in 1974. She came from a relatively obscure branch of Thoroughbred family 10 which had produced few major winners in Europe since Petrarch.

== Racing career ==
=== 1980: two-year-old season ===
After finishing unplaced on his debut over seven furlongs Protection Racket started favourite for the Houghton Stakes at Newmarket Racecourse over the same distance and came home fifth of the fourteen runners behind Sunley Builds. Later that month at the same track he was moved up in distance for a minor race over one mile and finished third behind Video Tape. In their annual Racehorses of 1980 the independent Timeform organisation commented that he was somewhat lacking in pace but looked likely to stay longer distances.

=== 1981: three-year-old season ===
As a three-year-old Protection Racket finished second and third in his first two races and then won a maiden race over fourteen furlongs (one and three quarter miles) at Newmarket in May. The colt was then moved up in class and distance for the Queen's Vase over two miles at Royal Ascot and finished second, two and a half lengths behind the Irish-trained Ore. He then won a minor handicap over fourteen furlongs at Yarmouth Racecourse later that month, after which a majority share in the colt was sold to Serge Fradkoff. There was an immediate disagreement between the new owner and the trainer: Hindley believed that the horse's future lay over extreme distances (two miles plus) while Fradkoff wanted to race him over shorter trips. After a break of six weeks he returned at York Racecourse in August for the Ebor Handicap in which he was ridden by Mark Birch and carried a weight of 113 pounds against older and more experienced opponents. Starting at odds of 15/2 he overhauled the long-time leader Shaftesbury a furlong out and held off the late challenge of Another Sam to win by one and a half lengths.

In September Protection Racket bypassed the St Leger Stakes to avoid a clash with Shergar and instead took on older horses in the Doncaster Cup over two and a quarter miles at the same meeting. His task was made considerably easier by the late withdrawal of Ardross and with John Lowe in the saddle he was made the 8/11 favourite against three opponents including the top class hurdler Heighlin (Triumph Hurdle) and the Chester Cup winner Donegal Prince. Protection Racket came home a length and a half ahead of Heighlin in a time of 3:52.7 which broke the course record set in 1949 by Alycidon. On 10 October Brian Taylor took the ride when the colt was sent to the Curragh to contest the Irish St Leger and started 6/4 favourite. Taylor was the stable's preferred jockey but had been unable to ride the horse in his last two races as he had been unable to make the weight. Erins Isle and Ore appeared to be the best of his rivals while other four runners were Bedford, Sailor King, Ashpin and the filly Overplay. Protection Racket overtook the leader Bedford two furlongs out and never looked in any danger of defeat, winning easily by three lengths from Erin's Isle.

In their rankings for 1981 Timeform gave Protecto Racket a rating of 122, nine pounds behind their best stayer Ardross and described him as "a splendidly tough and genuine staying colt and a great credit to his trainer".

=== 1982: four-year-old season ===
In 1982 Protection Racket was removed from Hindley's stable and sent to France where he was trained by Olivier Douieb. He was campaigned over middle distances and failed to win in four starts. On his French debut in April he finished second to Gap of Dunloe in the Prix d'Hédouville over 2400 metres at Longchamp Racecourse and then finished sixth to Bikala in the Prix Ganay in the following month. He was equipped with blinkers when he returned to England for the Coronation Cup at Epsom Racecourse in June and finished unplaced behind Easter Sun. On his final appearance of the year at Deauville Racecourse in August he finished fourth in the Prix de Reux. He was reportedly returned to the United Kingdom at the end of the year but was then exported to race in North America.

=== 1983: five-year-old season ===
In 1983 Protection Racket was campaigned in the United States where he was trained by Gary Kempler but made little impression in three starts. He finished second in a minor race at Belmont Park in July and was then off the track until November when he finished unplaced in the Knickerbocker Handicap at Aqueduct Racetrack and the Citation Handicap at Hollywood Park Racetrack.

== Stud record ==
At the end of his racing career Protection Racket was retired to become a breeding stallion in the United States. He appears to have attracted very little interest and sired few foals.

== Pedigree ==
Pedigree of Protection Racket (USA), bay stallion, 1978
Sire Graustark (USA) 1963	Ribot (GB); 1952	Tenerani	Bellini
Sire Graustark (USA) 1963	Ribot (GB); 1952	Tenerani	Tofanella
Sire Graustark (USA) 1963	Ribot (GB); 1952	Romanella	El Greco
Sire Graustark (USA) 1963	Ribot (GB); 1952	Romanella	Barbara Burrini
Sire Graustark (USA) 1963	Flower Bowl (USA); 1952	Alibhai	Hyperion
Sire Graustark (USA) 1963	Flower Bowl (USA); 1952	Alibhai	Teresina
Sire Graustark (USA) 1963	Flower Bowl (USA); 1952	Flower Bed	Beau Pere
Sire Graustark (USA) 1963	Flower Bowl (USA); 1952	Flower Bed	Boudoir
Dam Protectora (CHI) 1969	Prologo (CHI); 1962	Paresa	Pardal
Dam Protectora (CHI) 1969	Prologo (CHI); 1962	Paresa	Solesa
Dam Protectora (CHI) 1969	Prologo (CHI); 1962	Despejada	Jardiniere
Dam Protectora (CHI) 1969	Prologo (CHI); 1962	Despejada	Dispareja
Dam Protectora (CHI) 1969	Dauka (CHI); 1962	Prince d'Orange	Prince Chevalier
Dam Protectora (CHI) 1969	Dauka (CHI); 1962	Prince d'Orange	Isabelle Brand
Dam Protectora (CHI) 1969	Dauka (CHI); 1962	Darika	Forest Row
Dam Protectora (CHI) 1969	Dauka (CHI); 1962	Darika	Far Horizon (Family: 10)
