= Easter Sun =

British-bred Thoroughbred racehorse

- Sire: Bustino
- Grandsire: Busted
- Dam: Magical
- Damsire: Aggressor
- Sex: Stallion
- Foaled: 10 April 1977
- Country: United Kingdom
- Colour: Bay
- Breeder: Dayspring Co Ltd
- Owner: Lady Beaverbrook
- Trainer: Michael Jarvis
- Record: 27: 5-6-6

Major wins
- Aston Park Stakes (1982); Coronation Cup (1982)

Awards
- Timeform rating 90 (1979), 102 (1980), 106 (1981), 122 (1982), 120 (1983)

Easter Sun (10 April 1977 – c. 1988) was a British Thoroughbred racehorse and sire. In his first three seasons he showed good form in handicap races but appeared to be well below top class. In 1982, at the age of five, he showed remarkable improvement (16 pounds on Timeform ratings) and won the Aston Park Stakes before recording his biggest win in the Coronation Cup. He never won again but was placed in several good races before being retired at the end of the 1983 season. He made no impact as a breeding stallion in a brief stud career.

== Background ==
Easter Sun was a "compact", "bonny" bay horse with a small white star bred in the United Kingdom by Dayspring Co. Ltd. for his owner Lady Beaverbrook. He was from the first crop of foals sired by Bustino an outstanding middle-distance who won the St Leger and the Coronation Cup as well as finishing second to Grundy in a famous race for the King George VI and Queen Elizabeth Stakes. He went on to sire many other successful racehorses including Height of Fashion, Paean and Terimon. Easter Sun's dam Magical won two minor races from seven starts and was a distant, female-line descendant of the influential British broodmare Melody.

Lady Beaverbrook sent Easter Sun into training with Michael Jarvis at Newmarket, Suffolk. He was ridden in most of his races by Jarvis's stable jockey Bruce Raymond.

== Racing career ==
=== 1979–1981: early career ===
Easter Sun ran three times in maiden races as a two-year-old in 1979 and although he failed to win he showed some promise when finishing third to Bireme over seven furlongs at Newmarket Racecourse in October.

As a three-year-old, Easter Sun developed into a useful handicap performer. After finishing unplaced on his seasonal debut he won over ten furlongs at Newmarket in May, beating Nocino by three lengths. He failed to win in his remaining five races but was placed on three occasions including a narrow defeat in the Daniel Prenn Handicap when he was beaten a head by World Leader.

Easter Sun began his third season in a handicap at Newmarket in May and won by four lengths from Funny Spring. At Epsom Racecourse a month later he won the Daily Mirror Handicap, beating One Fleet Street by a head. He finished second in his next three races before ending his season by finishing fourth to Braughing in the Cambridgeshire Handicap.

=== 1982: five-year-old season ===
Although Easter Sun had spent most of his career racing over distances of around a mile and a quarter, his regular jockey Bruce Raymond had always believed that the horse would be better over a longer distance. On his first appearance of 1982 the horse was moved up in class and distance for the Aston Park Stakes, a weight-for-age contest over one mile five furlongs at Newbury Racecourse in May in which he faced by the established Group race performers Prince Bee (winner of the Gordon Stakes, Great Voltigeur Stakes and Prix Niel) and Critique (Cumberland Lodge Stakes). Racing on firm ground and receiving weight from his two principal opponents, he accelerated into the lead inside the final furlong and won by half a length from Critique with a gap of seven lengths back to Prince Bee in third. On 3 June Easter Sun made his first appearance in a Group race when he started a 20/1 outsider in an eight-runner field for the Group One Coronation Cup at Epsom. Glint of Gold was made favourite ahead of the French challenger Lancastrian, whilst the other runners were Critique, Prince Bee, Castle Keep (Doonside Cup), Protection Racket and Glint of Gold's pacemaker Show-A-Leg. After being restrained by Raymond in the early stages Easter Sun was switched to the outside in the straight, took the lead from Glint of Gold in the final furlong and won by half a length with Critique two and a half lengths back in third place. After the race Lady Beaverbrook said "Ive always had faith in Easter Sun, he shouldn't have been a handicapper at all. I told Michael Jarvis to have more confidence and that he was a group horse. I told [Bruce Raymond] off too. I told him that he is too placid and that he has to have more fire".

Easter Sun then contested Britain's most prestigious weight-for-age race, the King George VI and Queen Elizabeth Stakes at Ascot in July. He looked very well before the race but ran poorly and finished sixth of the nine runners behind Kalaglow. In the Geoffrey Freer Stakes at Newbury in August he proved no match for the dual Ascot Gold Cup winner Ardross and was narrowly beaten for second place by Baffin. Later that month he was sent to France and finished unplaced in the Grand Prix de Deauville after being hampered on the final turn.

=== 1983: six-year-old season ===
Easter Sun ran five times but failed to win. He was equipped with blinkers after his first start, an unplaced finish in the Jockey Club Stakes. He showed better form when campaigned internationally finishing second to Diamond Shoal in the Gran Premio di Milano and third to Prima Voce in the Grand Prix Prince Rose. He pulled hard when running unplaced behind Khairpour in the Geoffrey Freer Stakes and finished third in his final race.

== Assessment ==
The independent Timeform organisation gave Easter Sun a rating of 90 in 1979 and described him as being "sure to win a race". Timeform rated him at 102 in 1980 and 106 in 1981. In 1982, his best year, he was rated 122 by Timeform, twelve pounds inferior to their Horse of the Year Ardross. In the official International Classification he was given a rating of 80, thirteen pounds behind Kalaglow, who has the highest-rated older horse. In 1983 he was given a Timeform rating of 120 d, the "d" indicating that he had deteriorated and was probably no longer capable of running up to his best form.

== Stud record ==
Easter Sun was retired from racing to become a breeding stallion at the Haras d'Ayguemort in France. He sired no horses of any consequence, with the last of his recorded foals being born in 1988.

== Pedigree ==
Pedigree of Easter Sun (GB), bay stallion, 1977
Sire Bustino (GB) 1971	Busted (GB); 1963	Crepello	Donatello
Sire Bustino (GB) 1971	Busted (GB); 1963	Crepello	Crepuscule
Sire Bustino (GB) 1971	Busted (GB); 1963	Sans Le Sou	Vimy
Sire Bustino (GB) 1971	Busted (GB); 1963	Sans Le Sou	Martial Loan
Sire Bustino (GB) 1971	Ship Yard (GB); 1963	Doutelle	Prince Chevalier
Sire Bustino (GB) 1971	Ship Yard (GB); 1963	Doutelle	Above Board
Sire Bustino (GB) 1971	Ship Yard (GB); 1963	Paving Stone	Fairway
Sire Bustino (GB) 1971	Ship Yard (GB); 1963	Paving Stone	Rosetta
Dam Magical (GB) 1970	Aggressor (GB); 1955	Combat	Big Game
Dam Magical (GB) 1970	Aggressor (GB); 1955	Combat	Commotion
Dam Magical (GB) 1970	Aggressor (GB); 1955	Phaetonia	Nearco
Dam Magical (GB) 1970	Aggressor (GB); 1955	Phaetonia	Phaetusa
Dam Magical (GB) 1970	Rosebid (GB); 1965	Whistling Wind	Whistler
Dam Magical (GB) 1970	Rosebid (GB); 1965	Whistling Wind	Good As Gold
Dam Magical (GB) 1970	Rosebid (GB); 1965	Amber Slipper	His Slipper
Dam Magical (GB) 1970	Rosebid (GB); 1965	Amber Slipper	Coramere (Family: 3-j)
