= Gregorian (horse) =

American-bred Thoroughbred racehorse

- Sire: Graustark
- Grandsire: Ribot
- Dam: Natashka
- Damsire: Dedicate
- Sex: Stallion
- Foaled: 25 April 1976
- Country: United States
- Colour: Brown
- Breeder: H T Mangurian Jr
- Owner: Danny Schwartz
- Trainer: Vincent O'Brien
- Record: 9: 4-0-4

Major wins
- Westbury Stakes (1980); Brigadier Gerard Stakes (1980); Joe McGrath Memorial Stakes (1980)

Awards
- Timeform rating 115p (1978), 107 (1979), 124 (1980)

Gregorian (25 April 1976 – 2002) was an American-bred, Irish-trained Thoroughbred racehorse and sire. He was a very impressive winner of his only race as a two-year-old but ran third on his only appearance at three. He emerged as a top-class middle-distance performer in 1980, winning the Westbury Stakes and the Brigadier Gerard Stakes in England before recording his biggest win in the Joe McGrath Memorial Stakes, which was then the only Group 1 in Ireland open to older horses. He also finished third in both the Eclipse Stakes and the King George VI and Queen Elizabeth Stakes. After his retirement from racing he stood as a breeding stallion in the United States.

== Background ==
Gregorian was an "attractive, tall, lengthy" brown horse with a white star and snip bred in Florida by H T Mangurian Jr. As a yearling he was put up for auction and sold for $280,000. He was sent to race in Europe and entered training with Vincent O'Brien at Ballydoyle. During his racing career he competed in the black and red colours of the Californian businessmen Danny Schwartz.

His sire Graustark had a brief but promising racing career before becoming a very successful breeding stallion whose progeny included Prove Out, Key To The Mint, Avatar and Jim French. Gregorian's dam Natashka was a top-class performer on the track, winning the Alabama Stakes in 1966. She was even better as a broodmare, with her female-line descendants including Margarula, Elusive Quality, Dark Lomond and Questing.

== Racing career ==
=== 1978: two-year-old season ===
Gregorian made his first and only appearance as a two-year-old in a maiden race over one mile at Leopardstown Racecourse in October. Starting the 2/5 favourite against eighteen opponents he took the lead in the straight and accelerated away from the field to win by twelve lengths.

The independent Timeform gave Gregorian a rating of 115 p, the "p" indicating that he was expected to make more than usual improvement, and commented that "a lot more will be heard from him".

=== 1979: three-year-old season ===
In April 1979 Gregorian started odds-on favourite for the Ballymoss Stakes over ten furlongs at the Curragh. Racing on soft ground he never looked likely to win and finished a distant third of the seven runners behind Dickens Hill and the five-year-old Orchestra. He did not race again in 1979.

=== 1980: four-year-old season ===
After finishing unplaced over seven furlongs on his four-year-old debut, Gregorian was sent to England for the Group 3 Westbury Stakes over ten furlongs at Sandown Park Racecourse in April. Ridden by Lester Piggott he started at odds of 11/4 and won by three lengths from Prince Rheingold. Over the same course and distance a month later, with Piggott again in the saddle, he added a win in the Brigadier Gerard Stakes, beating Noelino by three lengths having led from the start. Gregorian was back again at Sandown in July and was moved up to the highest level for the Group 1 Eclipse Stakes. He got the better of Sea Chimes in a struggle for the lead and turned into the straight with a clear advantage but was overtaken in the closing stages and finished third behind Ela-Mana-Mou and Hello Gorgeous. The colt was then dropped in class and started favourite for the Royal Whip Stakes at the Curragh but ran poorly and was beaten into third place by the five-year-old mare My Hollow. When the colt returned to England for the King George VI and Queen Elizabeth Stakes at Ascot Racecourse he was ridden by Tommy Murphy as Piggott opted to partner the filly Mrs Penny. He finished third to Ela-Mana-Mou and Mrs Penny, tracking the leaders for most of the way and staying on well in the straight.

Having raced over one and a half miles in his last two starts, Gregorian was dropped back in distance to contest the fifth running of the Joe McGrath Memorial over ten furlongs at Leopardstown on 20 September and was made the 11/4 favourite against ten opponents including his stablemates Gonzales and Night Alert (winner of the Prix Jean Prat). The other fancied runners were Corvaro (Prix Eugène Adam) from France, Cracaval (Chester Vase) from England and the filly Racquette (third in The Oaks). The favourite was subject to a late jockey change with Tommy Murphy, having broken his ankle in the previous race, being replaced by George McGrath. Gregorian disputed the lead from the start and had a clear advantage three furlongs out. In the closing stages he was challenged and headed by the 40/1 outsider Spence Bay but rallied to regain the lead in the final strides and won by a short head. He did not run again and was retired from racing at the end of the year.

In the official International Classification for 1980, Gregorian was give a rating of 83, seven pounds behind the top older horse Ela-Mana-Mou. He was rated the second best Irish-trained older horse, three pounds behind the stayer Ardross. Timeform gave him a rating of 124. In their annual Racehorses of 1980 they noted that he had a tendency to swish his tail when under pressure but described him as "game and genuine".

== Stud record ==
Gregorian began his career as a breeding stallion at Windfields Farm in Maryland in 1981. The most successful of his offspring was Imperial Choice who was named Canadian Horse of the Year in 1985.

== Pedigree ==
Pedigree of Gregorian (USA), brown stallion, 1976
Sire Graustark (USA) 1963	Ribot (GB); 1952	Tenerani	Bellini
Sire Graustark (USA) 1963	Ribot (GB); 1952	Tenerani	Tofanella
Sire Graustark (USA) 1963	Ribot (GB); 1952	Romanella	El Greco
Sire Graustark (USA) 1963	Ribot (GB); 1952	Romanella	Barbara Burrini
Sire Graustark (USA) 1963	Flower Bowl (USA); 1952	Alibhai	Hyperion
Sire Graustark (USA) 1963	Flower Bowl (USA); 1952	Alibhai	Teresina
Sire Graustark (USA) 1963	Flower Bowl (USA); 1952	Flower Bed	Beau Pere
Sire Graustark (USA) 1963	Flower Bowl (USA); 1952	Flower Bed	Boudoir
Dam Natashka (USA) 1963	Dedicate (USA); 1952	Princequillo	Prince Rose
Dam Natashka (USA) 1963	Dedicate (USA); 1952	Princequillo	Cosquilla
Dam Natashka (USA) 1963	Dedicate (USA); 1952	Dini	John P Grier
Dam Natashka (USA) 1963	Dedicate (USA); 1952	Dini	Quiver
Dam Natashka (USA) 1963	Natasha (USA); 1952	Nasrullah	Nearco
Dam Natashka (USA) 1963	Natasha (USA); 1952	Nasrullah	Mumtaz Begum
Dam Natashka (USA) 1963	Natasha (USA); 1952	Vagrancy	Sir Gallahad
Dam Natashka (USA) 1963	Natasha (USA); 1952	Vagrancy	Valkyr (Family: 13-c)
