= Imperial Choice =

Canadian-bred Thoroughbred racehorse

- Sire: Gregorian
- Grandsire: Graustark
- Dam: Your My Choice
- Damsire: Barachois
- Sex: Gelding
- Foaled: 1982
- Country: Canada
- Colour: Dark Bay/Brown
- Breeder: E. P. Taylor
- Owner: Sam-Son Farm
- Trainer: Jim Day
- Record: 13: 8-3-0
- Earnings: $586,628

Major wins
- British Columbia Derby (1985); Alberta Derby Stakes (1985); Plate Trial Stakes (1985); Toronto Cup Handicap (1985) Canadian Classic Race wins: Prince of Wales Stakes (1985)

Awards
- Canadian Champion 3-Year-Old Male Horse (1985); Canadian Champion Champion Male Turf Horse (1985); Canadian Horse of the Year (1985)
- Last updated on August 1, 2008

Imperial Choice (foaled 1982, in Ontario) is a Canadian Thoroughbred racehorse. Bred by E. P. Taylor at his Windfields Farm, his dam was Your My Choice, whose sire Barachois was a son of the 20th Century's most important sire, Northern Dancer. His sire was Gregorian, a son of the outstanding runner Graustark whose career was cut short by injury.

In a year when Imperial Choice won major Canadian races in British Columbia, Alberta, and Ontario, he ran second in both the 1985 Queen's Plate and the Breeders' Stakes at Toronto's Woodbine Racetrack but in between, won the Prince of Wales Stakes at the Fort Erie Racetrack. Imperial Choice's performances earned him the 1985 Sovereign Award for Champion 3-Year-Old Male Horse, the Sovereign Award for Champion Male Turf Horse, and Canadian Horse of the Year honours.
