= Nottinghamshire Oaks =

Flat horse race in Britain

- Class: Listed
- Location: Nottingham Racecourse; Nottingham, England
- Inaugurated: 2006
- Race type: Flat / Thoroughbred
- Sponsor: British Stallion Studs
- Website: Nottingham

Race information
- Distance: 1m 2f 50y (2,057 m)
- Surface: Turf
- Track: Left-handed
- Qualification: Four-years-old and up fillies and mares Excl Group 1 winners after 31 August 2024
- Weight: 9 st 2 lb Penalties; 7 lb for Group 2 winners* 5 lb for Group 3 winner* 3 lb for Listed winners* *since 31 August 2024
- Purse: £55,000 (2025); 1st: £31,191

Nottinghamshire Oaks Stakes
2026
| See The Fire | It's A Heartbeat | Alla Stella |

Previous years
2025
Ambiente Amigo | Karmology | Rose Prick
2023
One For Bobby | Pink Carnation | Annerville
2022
Noon Star | Technique | Angel Power
2021
La Lune | Freyja | Black Lotus

2020-2011
2019
Sun Maiden | Shailene | Queen of Time
2018
Mia Tesoro | Titi Makfi | Glade
2017
Wilamina | Singyoursong | Entsar
2016
Elbereth | Tears of The Sun | Weetles
2015
Mutatis Mutandis | Dream Child | This Is The Day
2014
Secret Gesture | Wall Of Sound | We'll Go Walking
2013
La Arenosa | Sound Hearts | Dark Orchid
2012
Set To Music | Dragonera | Mid Mon Lady
2011
Timepiece | Sea Of Heartbreak | Ceilidh House

2010-2006
2010
Lady Jane Digby | Cassique Lady | Lady Artemisia
2009
Cassique Lady | Princess Taylor | Lady Jane Digby
2008
Ronaldsay | Cosmodrome | Miramare
2007
Dash To The Front | Queen's Best | Glitter Baby
2006
Power Girl | Mango Mischief | Play Me

The Nottinghamshire Oaks is a Listed flat horse race in Great Britain open to mares and fillies aged four years or older. It is run at Nottingham over a distance of 1 mile 2 furlongs and 50 yards (2,057 metres), and it is scheduled to take place each year in late April.

The race was run as the Warwickshire Oaks at Warwick over 11 furlongs between 2006 and 2013. It was run at Nottingham in 2014 after a horse had been killed in an accident at a Warwick flat meeting in May. The race was moved permanently, and renamed, from 2015 after Warwick had closed for flat racing. Prior to 2021 the race was run in late May or early June.

== Records ==
Most successful horse:

- no horse has won this race more than once

Leading jockey (3 wins):

- Jamie Spencer – Power Girl (2006), Set To Music (2012), Secret Gesture (2014)

Leading trainer (2 wins):

- Sir Michael Stoute - Sun Maiden (2019), Noon Star (2022)
- Andrew Balding - Elbereth (2016), See The Fire (2026)

== Winners ==
| Year | Winner | Age | Jockey | Trainer | Time |
|---|---|---|---|---|---|
| 2006 | Power Girl | 4 | Jamie Spencer | Paul Cole | 2:16.64 |
| 2007 | Dash To The Front | 4 | Oscar Urbina | James Fanshawe | 2:21.29 |
| 2008 | Ronaldsay | 4 | Richard Hughes | Richard Hannon Sr. | 2:14.98 |
| 2009 | Cassique Lady | 4 | Eddie Ahern | Lucy Wadham | 2:18.84 |
| 2010 | Lady Jane Digby | 5 | Greg Fairley | Mark Johnston | 2:18.67 |
| 2011 | Timepiece | 4 | Tom Queally | Henry Cecil | 2:20.21 |
| 2012 | Set To Music | 4 | Jamie Spencer | Michael Bell | 2:22.34 |
| 2013 | La Arenosa | 4 | Harry Bentley | Saeed bin Suroor | 2:21.22 |
| 2014 | Secret Gesture | 4 | Jamie Spencer | Ralph Beckett | 2:11.24 |
| 2015 | Mutatis Mutandis | 4 | Luke Morris | Ed Walker | 2:09.07 |
| 2016 | Elbereth | 5 | Oisin Murphy | Andrew Balding | 2:11.99 |
| 2017 | Wilamina | 4 | Andrea Atzeni | Martyn Meade | 2:09.67 |
| 2018 | Mia Tesoro | 5 | Stevie Donohoe | Charlie Fellowes | 2:10.38 |
| 2019 | Sun Maiden | 4 | Jim Crowley | Sir Michael Stoute | 2:11.86 |
| | no race 2020 (Note: The 2020 running was cancelled because of the COVID-19 pandemic in the United Kingdom) |
| 2021 | La Lune | 5 | David Probert | Henry Candy | 2:11.10 |
| 2022 | Noon Star | 4 | Ryan Moore | Sir Michael Stoute | 2:13.21 |
| 2023 | One For Bobby | 4 | Rob Hornby | Hughie Morrison | 2:15.89 |
| 2024 | Abandoned due to waterlogging |
| 2025 | Ambiente Amigo | 4 | Harry Davies | James Owen | 2:09.38 |
| 2026 | See The Fire | 5 | Rob Hornby | Andrew Balding | 2:12.24 |

== See also ==
- Horse racing in Great Britain
- List of British flat horse races
