= Lord North (horse) =

Irish-bred Thoroughbred racehorse

- Racing silks of Zayed bin Mohammed
- Sire: Dubawi
- Grandsire: Dubai Millennium
- Dam: Najoum
- Damsire: Giant's Causeway
- Sex: Gelding
- Foaled: 9 February 2016
- Country: Ireland
- Colour: Bay
- Breeder: Godolphin
- Owner: Zayed bin Mohammed
- Trainer: John Gosden; John & Thady Gosden (from late 2021)
- Record: 19: 9-3-1
- Earnings: £3,930,527

Major wins
- Cambridgeshire Handicap (2019); James Seymour Stakes (2019); Brigadier Gerard Stakes (2020); Prince of Wales's Stakes (2020); Dubai Turf (2021, 2022, 2023); Winter Derby (2023)

Honours
- Lord North Handicap at Meydan Racecourse
- Last updated on 27 February 2023

Lord North (foaled 9 February 2016) is an Irish-bred, British-trained Thoroughbred racehorse. After winning his only race as a juvenile in 2018, he won again on his three-year-old debut but ran poorly on his next start and was subsequently gelded. He returned to the track in the autumn of 2019 and recorded victories in the Cambridgeshire Handicap and the James Seymour Stakes. The gelding made further progress in 2020 when he won the Brigadier Gerard Stakes and the Prince of Wales's Stakes.

== Background ==
Lord North is a bay horse with no white markings bred in Ireland by Sheikh Mohammed's Godolphin organisation. He raced in the colours of Zayed bin Mohammed and was sent into training with John Gosden in Newmarket, Suffolk.

He was from the tenth crop of foals sired by Dubawi, whose wins included the Irish 2,000 Guineas and the Prix Jacques Le Marois. At stud, Dubawi has sired major winners such as Ghaiyyath, Monterosso, Al Kazeem, Makfi, Old Persian, Lucky Nine and Night of Thunder.

Lord North's dam Najoum showed modest racing ability, winning two minor races from four starts. She was a half-sister to the Blue Grass Stakes winner Bandini and a great-great-granddaughter of the outstanding racemare Moccasin.

== Racing career ==
=== 2018: two-year-old season ===
On his first and only appearance as a two-year-old, Lord North started the 7/2 third choice in the betting for a novice race (for horses with no more than two previous wins) over one mile at Redcar Racecourse on 19 October. Ridden by Robert Havlin he started slowly but made steady progress in the closing stages, took the lead 50 yards from the finish and won by a length from Fox Leicester.

=== 2019: three-year-old season ===
On 29 April Lord North began his 2019 campaign in a novice race over one mile on the synthetic Tapeta track at Newcastle Racecourse and won "very easily" by eleven lengths from his only opponent, a filly named Neesan. The colt was then stepped up in class for the Listed Heron Stakes at Sandown Park Racecourse in May. He was reluctant to enter the starting stalls and finished last of the eight runners behind King of Comedy after being denied a clear run in the final furlong. Three weeks after his poor run at Sandown, Lord North was gelded.

Lord North returned to the track on 6 September and finished second, beaten half a length by the five-year-old Bless Him in a handicap race over one mile at Ascot Racecourse. Three weeks later the gelding carried 122 pounds when he started the 9/2 favourite in a thirty-runner field for the Cambridgeshire Handicap over nine furlongs at Newmarket Racecourse. Ridden by Frankie Dettori he took the lead inside the final furlong and won "comfortably" by three quarters of a length from the four-year-old Beringer. After the race Dettori "once I got daylight he came alive and just took off. I was just laughing at the end, but at my age you have to enjoy yourself. I had to be patient and wait for my gaps – but wow, he had plenty left... he was a bit of a boy in his younger days but he is learning and maturing into a proper racehorse."

At Ascot on 19 October Lord North was assigned top weight of 134 pounds in the Balmoral Handicap. He started favourite but was beaten half a length into second place by the five-year-old Escobar. On his final run of the year the gelding contested the Listed James Seymour Stakes over ten furlongs on heavy ground at Newmarket on 2 November. Ridden by Havlin and starting the 10/11 favourite, he won by 2 1/4 lengths from Pablo Escobarr after taking the lead in the last quarter mile.

=== 2020: four-year-old season ===
The 2020 flat racing season in England was disrupted by the COVID-19 pandemic and the Group 3 Brigadier Gerard Stakes was run a week later than usual on 7 June at Haydock Park. Lord North, on his seasonal debut, went off the 3/1 second favourite behind the York Stakes winner Elarqam in a five-runner field which also included Sangarius (Hampton Court Stakes), Telecaster (Dante Stakes) and King Ottokar. Havlin settled the gelding behind the leaders before taking the lead from Elarqam approaching the final furlong and held off the renewed challenge of the favourite to win by a short head. John Gosden's son and assistant trainer Thady commented "He travelled very well into the race and when Rab asked him he picked up smartly. That looked a very strong race so it was pleasing he could win it first time out... our horse will probably benefit from the run."

Ten days after his victory at Haydock Lord North contested the Group 1 Prince of Wales's Stakes at Royal Ascot in which he was partnered by James Doyle and went off the 5/1 third choice in the betting behind Japan and Addeybb. The other four runners were Barney Roy, Headman (Prix Guillaume d'Ornano), Medaayih (Prix de Malleret) and Bangkok (Sandown Classic Trial). After being restrained towards the rear of the field Lord North was switched to the outside in the straight took the lead a furlong out and drew away to win "comfortably" by 3 3/4 lengths from Addeybb. Doyle commented "He quickened up like a really nice horse, a proper horse. He travelled into it great and showed a good turn of foot. I'd like to ride him again, put it that way", while John Gosden said "This horse had to be gelded, because he wasn't prepared to play ball, and he's the happiest fellow ever now, a great character. It was an end-to-end gallop, which suited us, and he just picked them off".

On 19 August, with Doyle again in the saddle, Lord North went off at odds of 4/1 in a five-runner field for the International Stakes over 10 1/2 furlongs at York Racecourse and finished third behind Ghaiyyath and Magical after losing a shoe during the race. After a break of almost two months the gelding returned to the track for the Champion Stakes over ten furlongs at Ascot in October in which he started the 11/2 third favourite but ran poorly and came home last of the ten runners. For his final race of the season Lord North was sent to the United States for the Breeders' Cup Turf at Keeneland on 7 November. After racing towards the rear of the field he stayed on strongly without looking likely to win and finished fourth behind Tarnawa, Magical and Channel Maker.

In the 2020 World's Best Racehorse Rankings, Lord North was rated on 123, making him the equal fifteenth best racehorse in the world.

== Pedigree ==
Pedigree of Lord North (IRE), bay gelding, 2016
Sire Dubawi (IRE) 2002	Dubai Millennium (GB); 1996	Seeking the Gold (USA)	Mr. Prospector
Sire Dubawi (IRE) 2002	Dubai Millennium (GB); 1996	Seeking the Gold (USA)	Con Game
Sire Dubawi (IRE) 2002	Dubai Millennium (GB); 1996	Colorado Dancer (IRE)	Shareef Dancer (USA)
Sire Dubawi (IRE) 2002	Dubai Millennium (GB); 1996	Colorado Dancer (IRE)	Fall Aspen (USA)
Sire Dubawi (IRE) 2002	Zomaradah (GB); 1995	Deploy	Shirley Heights
Sire Dubawi (IRE) 2002	Zomaradah (GB); 1995	Deploy	Slightly Dangerous (USA)
Sire Dubawi (IRE) 2002	Zomaradah (GB); 1995	Jawaher (IRE)	Dancing Brave (USA)
Sire Dubawi (IRE) 2002	Zomaradah (GB); 1995	Jawaher (IRE)	High Tern
Dam Najoum (USA) 2008	Giant's Causeway (USA); 1997	Storm Cat	Storm Bird (CAN)
Dam Najoum (USA) 2008	Giant's Causeway (USA); 1997	Storm Cat	Terlingua
Dam Najoum (USA) 2008	Giant's Causeway (USA); 1997	Mariah's Storm	Rahy
Dam Najoum (USA) 2008	Giant's Causeway (USA); 1997	Mariah's Storm	Immense
Dam Najoum (USA) 2008	Divine Dixie (USA); 1995	Dixieland Band	Northern Dancer (CAN)
Dam Najoum (USA) 2008	Divine Dixie (USA); 1995	Dixieland Band	Mississippi Mud
Dam Najoum (USA) 2008	Divine Dixie (USA); 1995	Hail Atlantis	Seattle Slew
Dam Najoum (USA) 2008	Divine Dixie (USA); 1995	Hail Atlantis	Flippers (Family: 5-h)
