= Jeremy Hindley =

English racehorse trainer (1944–2013)

Personal information
- Born: 1 January 1944 England
- Died: 7 January 2013 (aged 69) Hermanus, South Africa
- Occupation: Horse trainer

Horse racing career
- Sport: Horse racing
- Career wins: 700+

Significant horses
- Huntingdale, Protection Racket

Jeremy Hindley (1 January 1944 – 7 January 2013) was an English horse trainer who trained around 700 winners in a 17-year career.

He trained horses such as Protection Racket, who won the Irish St. Leger, The Go-Between, who won 11 starts at the Cornwallis Stakes, and Crash Course, winner of the Doncaster Cup

Hindley died on 7 January 2013, at the age 69 at his home in Hermanus, South Africa, after suffering from Motor neurone disease since 2001.
