= Boreal (horse) =

German-bred Thoroughbred racehorse

- Sire: Java Gold
- Grandsire: Key to the Mint
- Dam: Britannia
- Damsire: Tarim
- Sex: Stallion
- Foaled: 19 April 1998
- Country: Germany
- Colour: Chestnut
- Breeder: Gestut Ammerland
- Owner: Gestut Ammerland
- Trainer: Peter Schiergen
- Record: 14: 3-3-3
- Earnings: £611,664

Major wins
- Deutsches Derby (2001); Coronation Cup (2002)

Boreal (foaled 19 April 1998) is a German Thoroughbred racehorse and sire. In a racing career which lasted from March 2001 until March 2003, he ran fourteen times in four countries and won three races, two of them at Group One level. Unraced as a two-year-old, he won one minor race in his first four starts before winning the Deutsches Derby. In the following year, he was campaigned internationally and became the first German-trained horse in 27 years to record a Group One victory in the United Kingdom when he won the Coronation Cup. Apart from his successes, he was placed in several major races, including the Credit Suisse Pokal, Grosser Preis von Baden and Dubai Sheema Classic. He was retired from racing to become a breeding stallion but had very little success as a sire of winners.

== Background ==
Boreal was a chestnut horse with a white star and three white socks bred in Germany by Gestut Ammerland. He was sired by the American stallion Java Gold, whose wins included the Travers Stakes, Marlboro Cup, and Whitney Handicap in 1987. He stood as a breeding stallion in the United States, where he sired the outstanding sprinter Kona Gold before being exported to Germany. Boreal's dam, Britannia, was one of the best staying fillies of her generation in Germany, winning the Deutsches St Leger in 1988 and the Oleander Rennen in 1989. Her other foals included the outstanding racemare Borgia.

During his racing career, Boreal raced in the colours of Gestut Ammerland and was trained in Germany by Peter Schiergen. His owners had considered sending him to France to be trained by André Fabre but changed their minds as Schiergen "adored the colt and was very anxious to train him".

== Racing career ==
=== 2001: three-year-old season ===
Boreal made a successful racecourse debut by winning over 2000 metres at Frankfurt on 25 March. He was stepped up to Listed class, finishing second to Krombacher over 2200 metres at Hanover in April and third to Syrakus over 2000 metres at Dortmund on 24 May. On 10 June, he was ridden by John Reid when he started a 16/1 outsider for the Group Two Union-Rennen, a major trial race for the German Derby. After racing in second place, he took the lead 400 metres from the finish and despite being quickly overtaken, he stayed on well in the closing stages and finished third, beaten three quarters of a length and a nose by Sabiango and Barsetto. Three weeks later, he was one of eighteen colts to contest the 132nd German Derby over 2400 metres on soft ground at Hamburg. With Reid again in the saddle, he started at odds of 9.4/1 in a field which included Krombacher, Syrakus, and Barsetto. After racing in mid-division, he briefly struggled to obtain a clear run before accelerating in the straight, taking the lead 200 metres out and winning by one and a half lengths from Lierac. Schiergen commented: "The Derby has been my bogey race. I rode the runner-up three times and I've twice saddled the beaten favourite. This was easily my biggest winner as a trainer."

Boreal was matched against older horses for the first time in the Credit Suisse Pokal at Cologne on 12 August and started third favourite behind the British-trained Mutafaweq and Sabiango. He raced in fifth place before making steady progress in the straight and finished second, half a length behind Sabiango. In the Grosser Preis von Baden on 2 September, he finished second to Morshdi (winner of the Derby Italiano and runner-up in the Irish Derby) with Sabiango finishing third ahead of the 2000 German Derby winner, Paolini. Boreal's final appearance as a three-year-old was the Preis von Europa at Cologne three weeks later in which he was badly hampered and fell after 400 metres. John Reid was not seriously injured in the fall but said that the incident was a major factor in his decision to retire from riding a few days later.

=== 2002: four-year-old season ===
On his first race of 2002, Boreal made his first appearance outside Germany when he contested the Dubai Sheema Classic at Nad Al Sheba Racecourse on 23 March. Ridden by Kieren Fallon, he stayed on strongly in the straight and finished third behind Nayef and the New Zealand gelding Hades with the other beaten horses including Marienbard and Tobougg. On 7 June, the colt was sent to England and attempted to become the first German-trained horse to win the Coronation Cup over one and a half miles at Epsom Racecourse. Racing on soft ground, he started 4/1 third favourite behind Kutub (Preis von Europa, Gran Premio del Jockey Club, Singapore Gold Cup), and Storming Home. The other three runners were Marienbard, Zindabad (Yorkshire Cup), and Pawn Broker (Arc Trial). Fallon positioned the German challenger just behind the leader Zindabad before taking the lead entering the straight and tracking across to the stands-side (outside) rail. Boreal went clear of his rivals in the last quarter mile and won by three and a half lengths from Storming Home with Zindabad six lengths back in third. After training the first German winner at Group One level in Britain since Star Appeal took the 1975 Eclipse Stakes, Schiergen said, "He travels smoothly on good ground but is more at home on soft. It's a special thrill to have a winner in Britain, and extra-special when it's a Group 1 at the home of the Derby."

Boreal returned to England for the King George VI and Queen Elizabeth Stakes at Ascot Racecourse in July but was unsuited by the good-to-firm ground and finished seventh of the nine runners behind Golan. He was well beaten by Marienbard in his two remaining races that year, finishing sixth when favourite for the Grosser Preis von Baden and fifteenth when a 105/1 outsider for the Prix de l'Arc de Triomphe.

Boreal's final race came in March 2003 when he made a second bid for the Dubai Sheema Classic but finished last of the sixteen runners behind Sulamani.

== Stud record ==
At the end of his racing career, Boreal returned to become a breeding stallion at Gestut Ammerland. He has sired no winners of any consequence and by 2016 was standing at a stud fee of €500.

== Pedigree ==
Pedigree of Boreal (GER), chestnut stallion, 1998
| Sire Java Gold (USA) 1984 | Key to the Mint (USA); 1969 | Graustark | Ribot |
| Sire Java Gold (USA) 1984 | Key to the Mint (USA); 1969 | Graustark | Flower Bowl |
| Sire Java Gold (USA) 1984 | Key to the Mint (USA); 1969 | Key Bridge | Princequillo |
| Sire Java Gold (USA) 1984 | Key to the Mint (USA); 1969 | Key Bridge | Blue Banner |
| Sire Java Gold (USA) 1984 | Javamine (USA); 1973 | Nijinsky | Northern Dancer |
| Sire Java Gold (USA) 1984 | Javamine (USA); 1973 | Nijinsky | Flaming Page |
| Sire Java Gold (USA) 1984 | Javamine (USA); 1973 | Dusky Evening | Tim Tam |
| Sire Java Gold (USA) 1984 | Javamine (USA); 1973 | Dusky Evening | Home By Dark |
| Dam Britannia (GER) 1985 | Tarim (GB); 1969 | Tudor Melody | Tudor Minstrel |
| Dam Britannia (GER) 1985 | Tarim (GB); 1969 | Tudor Melody | Matelda |
| Dam Britannia (GER) 1985 | Tarim (GB); 1969 | Tamerella | Tamerlane |
| Dam Britannia (GER) 1985 | Tarim (GB); 1969 | Tamerella | Ella Retford |
| Dam Britannia (GER) 1985 | Bonna (GER); 1978 | Salvo | Right Royal |
| Dam Britannia (GER) 1985 | Bonna (GER); 1978 | Salvo | Manera |
| Dam Britannia (GER) 1985 | Bonna (GER); 1978 | Birgit | Altrek |
| Dam Britannia (GER) 1985 | Bonna (GER); 1978 | Birgit | Borinage (Family 14-b) |
