= Scintillo =

British-bred Thoroughbred racehorse

- Sire: Fantastic Light
- Grandsire: Rahy
- Dam: Danseuse Du Soir
- Damsire: Thatching
- Sex: Colt
- Foaled: 2005
- Country: United Kingdom
- Colour: Chestnut
- Breeder: Woodcote Stud Ltd.
- Owner: White Beech Farm
- Trainer: Richard Hannon, Sr.

Major wins
- Gran Criterium (2007); Winter Derby (2009); Grand Prix de Chantilly (2009)

Scintillo (foaled 6 February 2005) is a British-bred Thoroughbred racehorse which raced out of the United Kingdom. At the age two the colt won the Gran Criterium Group 1. Following an average three-year-old season he, like his sire, came into his own as a four-year-old, winning several significant contests. These include the Grand Prix de Chantilly and the Winter Derby. He was also the ROA All-weather horse of the year 2009.

He was trained by Richard Hannon, Sr. in Wiltshire UK and owned by the White Beech Farm racing syndicate.

Bred by the Woodcote Stud Scintillo is out of Danseuse Du Soir, which was the Broodmare of the Year in 2007. Danseuse Du Soir won the French 1,000 guineas (the Poule d'Essai des Pouliches) and the Prix de la Forêt in 1991. Scintillo's sire Fantastic Light was the Horse of the World in 2000 and the Eclipse Champion Turf Male in North America, ROA Horse of the Year (UK) & Horse of the World in 2001.
