= Java Gold =

American-bred Thoroughbred racehorse

- Sire: Key To The Mint
- Grandsire: Graustark
- Dam: Javamine
- Damsire: Nijinsky
- Sex: Stallion
- Foaled: 1984
- Country: United States
- Colour: Bay
- Breeder: Paul Mellon
- Owner: Rokeby Stables
- Trainer: MacKenzie Miller
- Record: 15: 9-3-1
- Earnings: US$1,908,832.

Major wins
- Remsen Stakes (1986); Best Turn Stakes (1987); Travers Stakes (1987); Marlboro Cup Invitational (1987); Whitney Handicap (1987)
- Last updated on May 14, 2010

Java Gold (1984–2009) was an American Thoroughbred racehorse who won three Grade 1 races and sired two Champions.

Bred by Paul Mellon, and raced by his Rokeby Stables, Java Gold notably won the 1986 Remsen Stakes at age two with Jerry Bailey aboard, then won the Grade 1 Travers Stakes, Marlboro Cup Invitational and Whitney Handicaps in 1987. With Pat Day aboard, his final career race was a second-place finish behind Creme Fraiche in the Jockey Club Gold Cup after trying to come from behind in which a very slow pace was being set by the front-runners. He retired from racing having won nine of his fifteen starts and with earnings of US$1,908,832.

A successful sire, Java Gold produced Kona Gold, winner of the 2000 Breeders' Cup Sprint and the Eclipse Award winner for American Champion Sprint Horse. Standing at Gestüt Ammerland in Germany, he also sired Access To Java, the 2000 German Champion Two-Year-Old Colt, and Boreal, who won the 2001 Group One Deutsches Derby in Germany and the 2002 Group One Coronation Cup in England.
