= Timepiece (horse) =

Thoroughbred racehorse

- Racing silks of Khalid Abdullah
- Sire: Zamindar
- Grandsire: Gone West
- Dam: Clepsydra
- Damsire: Sadler's Wells
- Sex: Mare
- Foaled: 7 February 2007
- Country: United Kingdom
- Colour: Bay
- Breeder: Juddmonte Farms
- Owner: Khalid Abdullah
- Trainer: Henry Cecil
- Record: 21: 6-5-3
- Earnings: £357,738

Major wins
- Montrose Stakes (2009); Sandringham Handicap (2010); James Seymour Stakes (2010); Warwickshire Oaks (2011); Falmouth Stakes (2011)

Timepiece (foaled 7 February 2007) is a British Thoroughbred racehorse and broodmare. In a racing career which lasted from September 2009 until September 2012 she won six of her twenty-one races and ran consistently well in top-class races over distances between one mile and ten furlongs.

Bred and owned by Khalid Abdullah and trained by Henry Cecil, Timepiece showed great promise as a juvenile in 2009 when she won two of her three races including the Montrose Stakes. In the following year she was regarded as a leading contender for The Oaks and although she finished only eighth in the classic she recorded significant victories in the Sandringham Handicap and the James Seymour Stakes. She reached her peak as a four-year-old in 2011 when she followed up a win in the Warwickshire Oaks with a career-best performance to win the Group One Falmouth Stakes, as well as finishing second in the Prix Jean Romanet and third in the Prix Rothschild. In 2012 Timepiece finished second in the Nassau Stakes and third in the Prix Jean Romanet before being retired from racing at the end of the year.

== Background ==
Timepiece is a bay mare with a broad white blaze and four long white socks bred by her owner Khalid Abdullah's Juddmonte Farms. Her sire Zamindar was a full-brother to Zafonic and recorded his biggest win in the Group Three Prix de Cabourg. He became a very successful sire of fillies, with his offspring including the multiple Group One winners Zarkava and Darjina. Timepiece's dam Clepsydra showed modest ability, winning one minor race at Epsom Racecourse from six starts but was a successful broodmare who produced several other winners including Passage of Time (Grand Prix de Saint-Cloud). She was a great-granddaughter of the American broodmare Aunt Tilt, a half sister of Damascus. The name "Timepiece" appears to be a reference to Clepsydra, which is the name of Greek water clock.

Khalid Abdullah sent Timepiece into training with Henry Cecil at the Warren Place stable in Newmarket. She was ridden in most of her races by Tom Queally.

== Racing career ==
=== 2009: two-year-old season ===
Timepiece made her racecourse debut in a one-mile maiden race at Newmarket Racecourse on 19 September in which she started the 11/8 favourite against twelve opponents. She took the lead approaching the final furlong but was overtaken in the closing stages and beaten half a length by Golden Aria. Three weeks later she contested a similar event on the Polytrack surface at Lingfield Park Racecourse and recorded her first victory as she led from the start and won by one and three quarter lengths from Shimmering Surf. Timepiece ended her first season with a step up in class for the Listed Montrose Stakes at Newmarket on 31 October in which she was ridden by Eddie Ahern and started 4/1 second favourite behind Marie de' Medici, a filly who had finished second in the Prix des Réservoirs. After taking the lead three furlongs from the finish she was headed by Nurture a furlong out but rallied to regain the advantage in the final strides and won by a nose.

=== 2010: three-year-old season ===
Before the start of the 2010 season Timepiece was regarded as a leading contender for The Oaks and was made ante-post favourite for the race by several major bookmakers. On her first appearance as a three-year-old Timepiece started favourite for the Feilden Stakes on 14 April but finished fourth of the nine runners behind Rumoush. She was made 4/7 favourite for the Lingfield Oaks Trial on 8 May, but after taking the lead three furlongs out she hung to left before being overtaken 75 yards from the finish and beaten into second by Dyna Waltz. After the race Henry Cecil commented "I don't know whether she's still a baby or she just didn't stay". Despite her defeat, Timepiece was allowed to take her chance in the Epsom Oaks and started the 7/1 fourth choice in the betting. With Queally riding the Cecil-trained favourite Aviate, Timepiece was ridden by Ahern and finished ninth of the fourteen runners behind Snow Fairy. On 16 June at Royal Ascot Timepiece was reunited with Queally and started 5/1 second favourite behind the Michael Stoute-trained Safina in the Sandringham Handicap over one mile. Carrying 131 pounds, she took the lead approaching the final furlong and held off a sustained challenge from Blue Maiden to win by one and a quarter lengths, with Safina two and three quarter lengths back in third place. Henry Cecil commented "Ascot can be a graveyard but she didn't seem to have much of a race at Epsom. Coming back from a mile and a half to a mile she's done well. She was getting a bit lazy and hanging but Tom changed his hands and she ran on again."

After a break of almost four months, Timepiece returned in the Severals Stakes over ten furlongs at Newmarket on 15 October and finished second to the Godolphin filly Modeyra. Two weeks later Timepiece was matched against colts in the Listed James Seymour Stakes over the same course and distance in which she was ridden by Ian Mongan and started 2/1 second favourite behind Godolphin's Kirklees, the winner of the Gran Criterium, York Stakes and September Stakes. The other fancied runners were Penitent (Lincoln Handicap) and Prince Siegfried (Doonside Cup). After tracking the leaders Timepiece gained the advantage from Prince Siegfried approaching the final furlong and, despite hanging to the left, she drew away in the closing stages to win by three and a half lengths.

=== 2011: four-year-old season ===
Timepiece began her third season in the Middleton Stakes over ten and a half furlongs at York Racecourse in May in which she was ridden by Mongan and finished third behind Midday and Sajjhaa. In the Princess Elizabeth Stakes at Epsom Racecourse on 3 June she led for most of the way but was overtaken approaching the final furlong and finished fourth behind Antara. Ten days later the filly started favourite for the Listed Warwickshire Oaks at Warwick Racecourse. After tracking the leaders, Queally sent Timepiece into the lead in the last quarter mile and the filly held on to win by half a length from Sea of Heartbreak. After the race Henry Cecil's assistant Mike Marshall commented She looked very professional as she jumped well and was always travelling nicely. That will be a good confidence booster after going to Epsom and I think there's a lot more to come from this filly".

On 8 July Timepiece was moved up to Group One class for the first time in over a year when she started a 16/1 outsider for the Falmouth Stakes at Newmarket. The French mare Sahpresa started favourite whilst the other runners included Lily of the Valley, Antara, Maqaasid (Queen Mary Stakes), Memory (Cherry Hinton Stakes), I'm A Dreamer (Dahlia Stakes), Joviality (Musidora Stakes) and the South African mare River Jetez (Balanchine). Timepiece tracked the outsider Masaya before going to the front a furlong out. As in several of her previous races, she hung to the left, but stayed on well in the closing stages and won by one and a quarter lengths from Sahpresa. After the race Cecil said "I think it is a question of she has to be absolutely right and I think Tom rode her absolutely right too. She did it very well. I was very pleased, as I had the chance of going for a listed race at Pontefract so I think we got it right today". Queally commented "We have never made any secret of how we feel about her – she has always had the ability. They hacked along, it rode like a piece of work and she took care of them. It's brilliant".

Timepiece was sent to France for the Prix Rothschild at Deauville Racecourse on 31 July and finished third behind Goldikova and Sahpresa. She was back in France three weeks later and started favourite for the Prix Jean Romanet but after taking the lead 400 metres she was overtaken in the closing stages and was beaten a short neck by the four-year-old Announce. On her final appearance of the season Timepiece made no impact in the Sun Chariot Stakes, finishing last of the eight runners behind Sahpresa.

=== 2012: five-year-old season ===
Timepiece remained in training as a five-year-old but failed to win in five races. She finished fourth behind Izzi Top when favourite for the Dahlia Stakes and then finished eighth behind the same filly in the Middleton Stakes. She produced her best performance of the season in the Nassau Stakes at Goodwood Racecourse on 4 August when she started a 16/1 outsider in an eight-runner field. She led from the start and accelerated in the straight but was caught in the closing stages and beaten a length by The Fugue. The other beaten fillies and mares included Was, Izzi Top, Nahrain (Prix de l'Opéra) and Sea of Heartbreak. Khalid Abdullah's racing manager Teddy Grimthorpe commented "She's run a super race and done everything right but she's just got done over in the last furlong. She's a genuine Group 1 filly and she's done really well today." Two weeks later Timepiece made a second attempt to win the Prix Jean Romanet but finished fourth behind the subsequently disqualified Snow Fairy. On her final start she was dropped in class for the Listed John Musker Fillies' Stakes at Yarmouth Racecourse. She started the 4/6 favourite but was badly hampered on two occasions and finished unplaced.

== Pedigree ==
Pedigree of Timepiece, bay mare, 2007
Sire Zamindar (USA) 1998	Gone West (USA); 1994	Mr. Prospector	Raise a Native
Sire Zamindar (USA) 1998	Gone West (USA); 1994	Mr. Prospector	Gold Digger
Sire Zamindar (USA) 1998	Gone West (USA); 1994	Secretame	Secretariat
Sire Zamindar (USA) 1998	Gone West (USA); 1994	Secretame	Tamerett
Sire Zamindar (USA) 1998	Zaizafon (USA); 1982	The Minstrel	Northern Dancer
Sire Zamindar (USA) 1998	Zaizafon (USA); 1982	The Minstrel	Fleur
Sire Zamindar (USA) 1998	Zaizafon (USA); 1982	Mofida	Right Tack
Sire Zamindar (USA) 1998	Zaizafon (USA); 1982	Mofida	Wold Lass
Dam Clepsydra (GB) 1997	Sadler's Wells (USA); 1981	Northern Dancer	Nearctic
Dam Clepsydra (GB) 1997	Sadler's Wells (USA); 1981	Northern Dancer	Natalma
Dam Clepsydra (GB) 1997	Sadler's Wells (USA); 1981	Fairy Bridge	Bold Reason
Dam Clepsydra (GB) 1997	Sadler's Wells (USA); 1981	Fairy Bridge	Special
Dam Clepsydra (GB) 1997	Quandary (USA); 1991	Blushing Groom	Red God
Dam Clepsydra (GB) 1997	Quandary (USA); 1991	Blushing Groom	Runaway Bride
Dam Clepsydra (GB) 1997	Quandary (USA); 1991	Lost Virtue	Cloudy Dawn
Dam Clepsydra (GB) 1997	Quandary (USA); 1991	Lost Virtue	Aunt Tilt (Family: 8-h)

- Timepiece was inbred 3 × 4 to Northern Dancer, meaning that this stallion appears in both the third and fourth generations of her pedigree.
