= Winter Derby =

Flat horse race in Britain

- Class: Group 3
- Location: Lingfield Park Racecourse; Lingfield, England
- Inaugurated: 1998
- Race type: Flat / Thoroughbred
- Sponsor: Midnite
- Website: Lingfield

Race information
- Distance: 1m 2f (2,012 metres)
- Surface: Polytrack
- Track: Left-handed
- Qualification: Four-years-old and up
- Weight: 9 st 2 lb; Allowances; 3 lb for fillies and mares Penalties; 7 lb for Group 1 winners * 5 lb for Group 2 winners * 3 lb for Group 3 winners * * since 31 August 2025
- Purse: £100,000 (2026); 1st: £56,710

Winter Derby
2025
Royal Champion	Military Academy	Persica

Previous years
2024
Military Order	Lord North	Tyrrhenian Sea
2023
Lord North	Tyrrhenian Sea	Foxes Tales
2022
Alenquer	Lord North	Fancy Man
2021
Forest Of Dean	Felix	Father Of Jazz

2020-2011
2020
Dubai Warrior	Court House	Bangkok
2019
Wissahickon	Court House	Pactolus
2018
Master The World	Mr Owen	Battle of Marathon
2017
Convey	Pinzolo	Absolute Blast
2016
Grendisar	Maverick Wave	Furia Cruzada
2015
Tryster	Grendisar	Grandeur
2014
Robin Hoods Bay	Windhoek	Aussie Reigns
2013
Farraaj	Robin Hoods Bay	Cai Shen
2012
Premio Loco	Cai Shen	Circumvent
2011
Nideeb	Dansili Dancer	Pachattack

2010-2001
2010
Tranquil Tiger	Suits Me	Pallodio
2009
Scintillo	Premio Loco	Bronze Cannon
2008
Hattan	Silver Pivotal	Great Hawk
2007
Gentleman's Deal	Grand Passion	Illustrious Blue
2006
Sri Diamond	Grand Passion	Nayyir
2005
Eccentric	Blythe Knight	Hurricane Alan
2004
Caluki	Anani	Bustan
2003
Parasol	Adiemus	Goblet of Fire
2002
Adiemus	I Cried For You	Laissezaller
2001
Sergeant York	Resplendent Star	Compton Bolter

2000-1998
2000
Zanay	Aljaarif	Widar
1999
Supreme Sound	Sick As A Parrot	Tallulah Belle
1998
Running Stag	Refuse To Lose	Fayik

The Winter Derby is a Group 3 flat horse race in Great Britain open to horses aged four years or older. It is run over a distance of 1 mile and 2 furlongs (2,012 metres) at Lingfield Park in February or March.

== History ==
The event was established in 1998 at Lingfield Park, and the inaugural edition was won by Running Stag. It was given Listed status in 1999, and promoted to Group 3 level in 2006. The original race distance was 1 mile 2 furlongs.

The Winter Derby is run on a Polytrack surface. It is one of four non-turf Group races in Britain, along with the Chipchase Stakes, September Stakes and the Sirenia Stakes. It is currently the country's first Group race of the year.

From 2024 to 2025 the race was run at Southwell Racecourse over 1 mile 3 furlongs and 23 yards as part of changes to the British horse racing fixture list. In 2026 it returned to Lingfield Park and reverted to 1 mile 2 furlongs.

== Records ==
Most successful horse:

- no horse has won this race more than once

Leading jockey (4 wins):

- Frankie Dettori – Parasol (2003), Caluki (2004), Wissahickon (2019), Dubai Warrior (2020)

Leading trainer (4 wins):

- John Gosden - Wissahickon (2019), Dubai Warrior (2020), Forest of Dean (2021), Lord North (2023)

== Winners ==
Year	Winner	Age	Jockey	Trainer	Time
1998	Running Stag	4	Ray Cochrane	Philip Mitchell	2:05.92
1999	Supreme Sound	5	Gary Bardwell	Peter Harris	2:05.44
2000	Zanay	4	Tom McLaughlin	Jacqui Doyle	2:05.03
2001	Sergeant York	5	Richard Hughes	David Barron	2:04.59
2002	Adiemus	4	Shane Kelly	Jeremy Noseda	2:05.54
2003	Parasol	4	Frankie Dettori	David Loder	2:03.60
2004	Caluki	7	Frankie Dettori	Luigi Camici	2:05.85
2005	Eccentric	4	John Egan	Andrew Reid	2:03.79
2006	Sri Diamond	6	Jamie Spencer	Sylvester Kirk	2:04.77
2007	Gentleman's Deal	6	Paul Mulrennan	Mick Easterby	2:04.57
2008	Hattan	6	Seb Sanders	Clive Brittain	2:03.61
2009	Scintillo	4	Richard Hughes	Richard Hannon Sr.	2:03.79
2010	Tranquil Tiger	6	Tom Queally	Henry Cecil	2:03.27
2011	Nideeb	4	Philip Robinson	Clive Brittain	2:03.42
2012	Premio Loco	8	George Baker	Chris Wall	2:03.49
2013	Farraaj	4	Andrea Atzeni	Roger Varian	2:00.99
2014	Robin Hoods Bay	6	Luke Morris	Ed Vaughan	2:01.41
2015	Tryster	4	Adam Kirby	Charlie Appleby	2:01.71
2016	Grendisar	6	Adam Kirby	Marco Botti	2:01.05
2017	Convey	5	Andrea Atzeni	Sir Michael Stoute	2:04.68
2018	Master The World (Note: Mr Owen finished first in 2018, but was relegated to second place following a stewards' inquiry)	7	Sean Levey	David Elsworth	2:02.73
2019	Wissahickon	4	Frankie Dettori	John Gosden	2:01.28
2020	Dubai Warrior	4	Frankie Dettori	John Gosden	2:01.64
2021	Forest of Dean	5	Robert Havlin	John Gosden	2:04.92
2022	Alenquer	4	Cieren Fallon	William Haggas	2:00.51
2023	Lord North	7	Robert Havlin	John & Thady Gosden	2:02.32
2024	Military Order	4	Daniel Tudhope	Charlie Appleby	2:24.15
2025	Royal Champion	7	Clifford Lee	Karl Burke	2:23.14
2026	Sky Safari	5	Daniel Muscutt	James Fanshawe	2:04.15

== See also ==
- Horse racing in Great Britain
- List of British flat horse races
