= Glint of Gold =

British-bred Thoroughbred racehorse

- Racing silks of Paul Mellon
- Sire: Mill Reef
- Grandsire: Never Bend
- Dam: Crown Treasure
- Damsire: Graustark
- Sex: Stallion
- Foaled: 5 April 1978
- Country: United Kingdom
- Colour: Bay
- Breeder: Paul Mellon
- Owner: Paul Mellon
- Trainer: Ian Balding
- Record: 17: 10-6-1

Major wins
- Gran Criterium (1980); Warren Stakes (1981); Derby Italiano (1981); Grand Prix de Paris (1981); Great Voltigeur Stakes (1981); Preis von Europa (1981); John Porter Stakes (1982); Grand Prix de Saint-Cloud (1982); Grosser Preis von Baden (1982)

Awards
- Timeform rating: 128 (1981), 127 (1982); Gilbey Racing Middle Distance Champion (1982)

Glint of Gold (5 April 1978 – 1990) was a British Thoroughbred racehorse and sire. A middle-distance specialist, he was noted for his toughness and consistency, winning ten races, finishing second six times and third once in a seventeen race career which lasted from July 1980 until September 1982. He won races in four countries including six at Group One level. His major victories included the Gran Criterium and Derby Italiano in Italy, the Grand Prix de Paris and Grand Prix de Saint-Cloud in France, the Preis von Europa and Grosser Preis von Baden in Germany and the Great Voltigeur Stakes and John Porter Stakes in Britain. He was also placed in The Derby, St Leger Stakes, Coronation Cup and King George VI and Queen Elizabeth Stakes. He was retired to stud at the end of the 1982 season and had modest success as a sire of winners.

== Background ==
Glint of Gold was a strongly-built, good-looking bay horse with a white star bred by his owner Paul Mellon. He was sired by Mellon's stallion Mill Reef and American-bred horse who won the Epsom Derby, King George VI and Queen Elizabeth Stakes and Prix de l'Arc de Triomphe in 1971. Mill Reef's other offspring included Reference Point, Milligram, Shirley Heights, Lashkari and Doyoun. Glint of Gold was the first foal of his dam Crown Treasure, a daughter of Graustark who was sent to Europe in to be covered by Mill Reef and remained there for several years owing to import restrictions. A year after Glint of Gold was foaled, Crown Treasure produced his full-brother Diamond Shoal, an outstanding middle-distance performer who won the Gran Premio di Milano, Grand Prix de Saint-Cloud, Grosser Preis von Baden in 1983. She later produced Crystal Spirit, a leading hurdler who won the Sun Alliance Hurdle and the Cleeve Hurdle in 1991.

Like many of Mellon's best horses, Glint of Gold was trained at Kingsclere in Hampshire by Ian Balding. He was ridden in most of his races by the British jockey John Matthias. Like many of Balding's horses, Glint of Gold usually raced on a sheepskin noseband.

== Racing career ==
=== 1980: two-year-old season ===
Glint of Gold ran three times as a two-year-old in 1980. He made a successful debut at Ascot Racecourse in July when he won the Sandwich Stakes over seven furlongs. In August he started favourite for the Acomb Stakes (now a Group Three race) at York Racecourse but was beaten into second place by Cocaine. In October he was moved up in class and sent to Italy to contest the Group One Gran Criterium over 1600m in Milan. He won from Bold Brigadier, No Piracy and thirteen others.

=== 1981: three-year-old season ===
Glint of Gold began his three-year-old season by winning the Warren Stakes over one and a half miles at Epsom Downs Racecourse on 21 April, after which he was offered at odds of 33/1 for the Derby Stakes over the same course and distance. In May he was sent to Italy for the second time for the Derby Italiano over 2400m at the Capannelle Racecourse in Rome for which he was the only foreign challenger and started odd-on favourite. Matthias sent him into the lead in the straight and he won very easily by two lengths from My Franky.

At Epsom on 3 June Glint of Gold was one of eighteen colt to contest the 202nd running of the Derby and started at odds of 13/1 behind Shergar, Shotgun and Kalaglow. Glint o Gold was towards the rear of the field in the early stages before making steady progress in the straight. He never had any chance with Shergar, who won by a record margin of ten lengths but was clearly the best of the other runners, beating Scintillating Air by two length for the second place. Matthias reportedly believed that he had won the race as he crossed the line: "I thought I had won ... Shergar had gone so far clear I didn't see him". In late June, Glint of Gold was sent to France for the Grand Prix de Paris over 3000 metres at Longchamp Racecourse but the race was cancelled and then rescheduled for 4 July because of industrial action by Pari-Mutuel staff. Glint of Gold became the first British-trained winner of the race since Lemonora in 1921 as he defeated Tipperary Fixer by three lengths with the favourite Vayrann in third place. In August Glint of Gold returned to England for the Great Voltigeur takes, a trial race for the St Leger Stakes, run over one and a half miles at York Racecourse. Carrying a seven-pound weight penalty as a Group One winner, he started even money favourite and produced a "striking" performance, taking the lead in the straight and winning by three lengths from Little Wolf who was in turn seven lengths clear of the other five runners.

On 12 September at Doncaster Racecourse, Glint of Gold was one of six colts to oppose Shergar in the 205th running of the St Leger. Since winning the Derby, the Aga Khan's colt had won the Irish Derby and the King George VI and Queen Elizabeth Stakes and started the 4/9 favourite, with Glint of Gold second in the betting on 4/1. Matthias tracked the leaders before turning into the straight in second place behind Bustomi, with Shergar in third. As Shergar began to struggle, Glint of Gold moved into the lead two furlongs from the finish and looked the likely winner but was overtaken and beaten two and a half lengths by the 28/1 outsider Cut Above. Having already won Group One races in Italy and France, Glint of Gold ended his season with a win in Germany's most valuable race, the Preis von Europa in Köln in October. Racing on heavy ground, he took the lead in the straight and won by three and a half length from the Polish horse Czubaryk and the Russian filly Struna.

=== 1982: four-year-old season ===
Glint of Gold began his third season in the John Porter Stakes at Newbury Racecourse in April. Starting at odds of 7/2 he appeared to be less than fully fit but won by a neck from Amyndas, to whom he was conceding six pounds. Two weeks later at Newmarket Racecourse he was beaten by Ardross in a closely contested finish for the Jockey Club Stakes. On 3 June Glint of Gold started the 7/4 favourite for the Coronation Cup at Epsom. Matthias tracked the pacemaker Show-A-Leg before taking the lead in the straight but was overtaken in the closing stages and beaten half a length by Easter Sun. Matthias was criticised by some commentators who felt that he should have taken the lead earlier and made better use of Glint of Gold's stamina. At Royal Ascot Glint of Gold ran in the Group Two Hardwicke Stakes in which he was held up by Matthias before making his challenge in the straight. In a rough finish he took the lead in the final furlong but was overtaken and beaten by a length by Critique, an unpredictable horse who was given a much-praised ride by Lester Piggoott. Following further criticism of Matthias, Pat Eddery took over as Glint of Gold for his remaining races.

After three consecutive defeats in England, Glint of Gold was sent to France for the Grand Prix de Saint-Cloud over 2500m on 4 July. Eddery sent him into the lead from the start and set such a strong pace that most of his opponents were struggling by the time they entered the straight. The French-trained five-year-old Lancastrian emerged as his only serious challenger and briefly took the lead 100m from the finish, but Glint of Gold rallied strongly in the closing strides to win by a head. Eddery was again in the saddle on 24 July when Glint of Gold contested Britain's most prestigious weight-for-age race, the King George VI and Queen Elizabeth Stakes. Starting at odds of 10/1, Glint of Gold tracked the leaders before making a strong challenge in the straight. He appeared to have taken a narrow lead approaching the final furlong but was outpaced in the closing stages and eventually beaten into third place by Kalaglow and Assert. It was the first and only time that Glint of Gold failed to finish first or second.

In September, Glint of Gold was sent to Germany for the second time when he was matched against the German Horse of the Year in the Grosser Preis von Baden. Starting the odds-on favourite, he led from the start and won very easily by two and three quarter lengths. He was than aimed at the Prix de l'Arc de Triomphe, but after his training was interrupted by a minor tendon injury and a high temperature, he was withdrawn from the race and retired to stud.

== Assessment ==
In 1981, Glint of Gold was given a rating of 128 by the independent Timeform organisation, twelve pounds below the top-rated Shergar. In their annual Racehorses of 1981, Timeform described him as "a very hardy, genuine and courageous racehorse". In the official International Classification, he was rated thirteen pounds behind Shergar as the ninth best three-year-old colt in Europe. In the following year's International Classification he was rated the tenth best horse of any age in Europe, seven pound behind the top-rated Golden Fleece. In the Gilbey Racing Awards, based on point awarded for performances in major races across Europe, Glint of Gold was named "Middle Distance Champion".

== Stud record ==
Glint of Gold was retired from racing to become a breeding stallion at the Derisley Wood Stud near Newmarket. He had some success as a sire of flat race horses with his best winners including Heart of Darkness (National Stakes) and Tessla (Fillies' Mile). He also made an impact as a National Hunt stallion, siring Dawson City (Dipper Novices' Chase), Ikdam (Triumph Hurdle) and Vagog (Long Walk Hurdle).

== Pedigree ==
Pedigree of Glint of Gold, bay stallion, 1978
Sire Mill Reef (USA) 1968	Never Bend (USA); 1960	Nasrullah	Nearco
Sire Mill Reef (USA) 1968	Never Bend (USA); 1960	Nasrullah	Mumtaz Begum
Sire Mill Reef (USA) 1968	Never Bend (USA); 1960	Lalun	Djeddah
Sire Mill Reef (USA) 1968	Never Bend (USA); 1960	Lalun	Be Faithful
Sire Mill Reef (USA) 1968	Milan Mill (USA); 1962	Princequillo	Prince Rose
Sire Mill Reef (USA) 1968	Milan Mill (USA); 1962	Princequillo	Cosquilla
Sire Mill Reef (USA) 1968	Milan Mill (USA); 1962	Virginia Water	Count Fleet
Sire Mill Reef (USA) 1968	Milan Mill (USA); 1962	Virginia Water	Red Ray
Dam Crown Treasure (USA) 1973	Graustark (USA); 1963	Ribot	Tenerani
Dam Crown Treasure (USA) 1973	Graustark (USA); 1963	Ribot	Romanella
Dam Crown Treasure (USA) 1973	Graustark (USA); 1963	Flower Bowl	Alibhai
Dam Crown Treasure (USA) 1973	Graustark (USA); 1963	Flower Bowl	Flower Bed
Dam Crown Treasure (USA) 1973	Treasure Chest (USA); 1962	Rough 'n Tumble	Free For All
Dam Crown Treasure (USA) 1973	Treasure Chest (USA); 1962	Rough 'n Tumble	Roused
Dam Crown Treasure (USA) 1973	Treasure Chest (USA); 1962	Iltis	War Relic
Dam Crown Treasure (USA) 1973	Treasure Chest (USA); 1962	Iltis	We Hail (Family:21-a)
