= Sandown Classic Trial =

Flat horse race in Britain

Sandown Classic Trial (Bet365 Classic Trial)
- Class: Group 3
- Location: Sandown Park; Esher, England
- Inaugurated: 1953
- Race type: Flat / Thoroughbred
- Sponsor: Bet365
- Website: Sandown Park

Race information
- Distance: 1m 1f 209y (2,002 m)
- Surface: Turf
- Track: Right-handed
- Qualification: Three-year-olds
- Weight: 9 st 3 lb Allowances; 3 lb for fillies Penalties; 4 lb for Group 1 or Group 2 winners * * since 31 August last year
- Purse: £85,000 (2025); 1st: £48,204

Classic Trial
2026
Raaheeb	Al Zanati	Wise Prince

Previous years
2025
Swagman	Windlord	Damysus
2024
Arabian Crown	Macduff	Remaadd
2022
Westover	Cash	Goldspur
2021
Alenquer	Adayar	Yibir

2020-2011
2020
Berlin Tango	Pyledriver	Bright Melody
2019
Bangkok	Technician	Persian Moon
2018
Sevenna Star	Ispolini	Hunting Horn
2017
Cunco	Intern	Frankuus
2016
Midterm	Algometer	High Grounds
2015
Master Apprentice	Cape Clear Island	Snoano
2014
Western Hymn	Impulsive Moment	Master Carpenter
2013
Sugar Boy	Eye of The Storm	Galileo Rock
2012
Imperial Monarch	Thought Worthy	Rougemont
2011
Genius Beast	Measuring Time	Auld Burns

2010-2001
2010
Azmeel	Simenon	Bikini Babe
2009
Above Average	Big Bound	Malibu Bay
2008
Centennial	Whistledownwind	Feared In Flight
2007
Regime	Striving Storm	Asperity
2006
Primary	The Last Drop	Baan
2005
Fracas	Merger	Hattan
2004
African Dream	Privy Seal	Gold History
2003
Shield	Inch Again	Strength 'n Honour
2002
Simeon	Kaieteur	Right Approach
2001
Chancellor	Asian Heights	Gryffindor

2000-1991
2000
Sakhee	Pawn Broker	Going Global
1999
Fantastic Light	Dehoush	Glamis
1998
Courteous	Eco Friendly	Muhtathir
1997
Voyagers Quest	Benny The Dip	Silver Patriarch
1996
Santillana	Glory Of Dancer	Mons
1995
Pentire	Singspiel	Balliol Boy
1994
Linney Head	Khamaseen	Time Star
1993
True Hero	Placerville	Majority
1992
Pollen Count	Aljadeer	Assessor
1991
Hailsham	Jaffa Line	Jahafil

1990-1981
1990
Defensive Play	Rock Hopper	Karinga Bay
1989
Old Vic	Spring Hay	Pride Of Araby
1988
Galitzin	Glacial Storm	Maksud
1987
Gulf King	Grand Tour	Bengal Tiger
1986
Shahrastini	Bonhomie	Sirk
1985
Daminster	Petoski	Gallant Archer
1984
Alphabatim	Trojan Fen	Flagstaff
1983
Gordian	Neorion	Welsh Idol
1982
Peacetime	Be My Native	Jalmood
1981
Shergar	Kirtling	King's General

1980-1978
1980
Henbit	Huguenot	Ginistrelli
1979
Troy	Two of Diamonds	Donegal Prince
1978
Whitshead	Shirley heights	Roscoe Blake
1977
Artaius	Night Before	Tamanaco

The Sandown Classic Trial is a Group 3 flat horse race in Great Britain open to three-year-old horses. It is run over a distance of 1 mile, 1 furlong and 209 yards (2,002 metres) at Sandown Park in late April.

== History ==
The event was established in 1953, and it was originally called the Royal Stakes. The first running was won by Mountain King.

Ladbrokes became the sponsor of the race in 1971, and from this point it was known as the Ladbroke Classic Trial. It took place at Kempton Park in 1973.

Subsequent sponsors have included The Guardian, Thresher and Betfred. The online gambling company Bet365 took over the sponsorship in 2008.

The Sandown Classic Trial is staged during a two-day meeting which features both flat and jump races. Other events at the meeting include the Bet365 Gold Cup, the Celebration Chase, the Gordon Richards Stakes and the Sandown Mile.

The race can serve as a trial for the Epsom Derby. The most recent participant to win the Derby is Adayar, the 2021 runner-up.

== Records ==
Leading jockey (5 wins):

- Lester Piggott – Sun Charger (1957), Snow Cat (1958), Ferneley (1962), Sun Rock (1967), Artaius (1977)

Leading trainer (9 wins):

- John Gosden – Pollen Count (1992), True Hero (1993), Linney Head (1994), Santillana (1996), Centennial (2008), Azmeel (2010), Western Hymn (2014), Cunco (2017), Sevenna Star (2018)

== Winners ==
Year	Winner	Jockey	Trainer	Time
1953	Mountain King	Eph Smith	John Waugh	2:08.60
1954	Taw Valley	Eph Smith	Geoffrey Barling	2:13.00
1955	Peter Aegus	Bill Rickaby	Jack Jarvis	2:12.20
1956	Pearl Orama	Scobie Breasley	Staff Ingham	2:15.00
1957	Sun Charger	Lester Piggott	Noel Murless	2:10.60
1958	Snow Cat	Lester Piggott	Noel Murless	2:17.00
1959	Casque	Scobie Breasley	Herbert Blagrave	2:27.40
1960	Marengo	Snowy Fawdon	Marcus Marsh	2:10.80
1961	Just Great	Geoff Lewis	Staff Ingham	2:16.20
1962	Ferneley	Lester Piggott	Noel Murless	2:13.20
1963	Raise You Ten	Harry Carr	Cecil Boyd-Rochfort	2:18.00
1964	Oncidium	Eph Smith	John Waugh	2:23.40
1965	Nearside	Joe Mercer	Dick Hern	2:12.20
1966	Mehari	Doug Smith	John Winter	2:25.20
1967	Sun Rock	Lester Piggott	Noel Murless	2:13.80
1968	Safety Match	Greville Starkey	John Oxley	2:14.20
1969	Shoemaker	Duncan Keith	Peter Walwyn	2:15.00
1970	Cry Baby	Sandy Barclay	Noel Murless	2:19.20
1971	L'Apache	Tony Murray	Tommy Gosling	2:19.40
1972	Pentland Firth	Pat Eddery	George Barling	2:10.50
1973 (Note: The 1973 race was run at Kempton Park)	Ksar	Willie Carson	Bernard van Cutsem	2:06.48
1974	Bustino	Joe Mercer	Dick Hern	2:09.91
1975	Consol	Pat Eddery	Peter Walwyn	2:16.70
1976	Riboboy	Joe Mercer	Dick Hern	2:09.38
1977	Artaius	Lester Piggott	Vincent O'Brien	2:11.27
1978	Whitstead	Brian Taylor	Ryan Price	2:20.05
1979	Troy	Willie Carson	Dick Hern	2:22.72
1980	Henbit	Willie Carson	Dick Hern	2:11.38
1981	Shergar	Walter Swinburn	Michael Stoute	2:09.35
1982	Peacetime	Pat Eddery	Jeremy Tree	2:04.78
1983	Gordian	Greville Starkey	Guy Harwood	2:31.19
1984	Alphabatim	Brian Rouse	Guy Harwood	2:06.02
1985	Damister	Steve Cauthen	Jeremy Tree	2:10.02
1986	Shahrastani	Walter Swinburn	Michael Stoute	2:18.77
1987	Gulf King	Paul Cook	Paul Kelleway	2:07.35
1988	Galitzin	Ray Cochrane	Clive Brittain	2:15.47
1989	Old Vic	Steve Cauthen	Henry Cecil	2:20.65
1990	Defensive Play	Pat Eddery	Guy Harwood	2:05.55
1991	Hailsham	Michael Roberts	Clive Brittain	2:08.30
1992	Pollen Count	Steve Cauthen	John Gosden	2:07.85
1993	True Hero	Ray Cochrane	John Gosden	2:16.54
1994	Linney Head	Frankie Dettori	John Gosden	2:17.00
1995	Pentire	Michael Hills	Geoff Wragg	2:07.48
1996	Santillana	Frankie Dettori	John Gosden	2:06.64
1997	Voyagers Quest	John Reid	Peter Chapple-Hyam	2:12.54
1998	Courteous	Richard Quinn	Paul Cole	2:19.41
1999	Fantastic Light	Darryll Holland	Sir Michael Stoute	2:15.73
2000	Sakhee	Richard Hills	John Dunlop	2:23.83
2001	Chancellor	Michael Hills	Barry Hills	2:36.20
2002	Simeon	Kevin Darley	Mark Johnston	2:12.98
2003	Shield	Eddie Ahern	Gerard Butler	2:08.32
2004	African Dream	Jimmy Quinn	Peter Chapple-Hyam	2:12.93
2005	Fracas	Jamie Spencer	David Wachman	2:11.36
2006	Primary	Darryll Holland	William Haggas	2:09.40
2007	Regime	Frankie Dettori	Michael Bell	2:09.65
2008	Centennial	Jimmy Fortune	John Gosden	2:09.61
2009	Above Average	Michael Hills	Barry Hills	2:10.24
2010	Azmeel (Note: Chabal finished first in 2010, but he was subsequently disqualified after testing positive for a banned substance)	William Buick	John Gosden	2:10.94
2011	Genius Beast	Ahmed Ajtebi	Mahmood Al Zarooni	2:11.39
2012	Imperial Monarch	Joseph O'Brien	Aidan O'Brien	2:27.86
2013	Sugar Boy	Chris Hayes	Patrick Prendergast	2:12.26
2014	Western Hymn	William Buick	John Gosden	2:19.53
2015	Master Apprentice	David Probert	Andrew Balding	2:12.91
2016	Midterm	Ryan Moore	Sir Michael Stoute	2:11.11
2017	Cunco	Robert Tart	John Gosden	2:14.33
2018	Sevenna Star	Frankie Dettori	John Gosden	2:14.13
2019	Bangkok	Silvestre de Sousa	Andrew Balding	2:09.43
2020 (Note: The 2020 race was run at Kempton Park in June, due to the COVID-19 pandemic in the United Kingdom)	Berlin Tango	David Probert	Andrew Balding	2:06.70
2021	Alenquer	Tom Marquand	William Haggas	2:12.13
2022	Westover	Rob Hornby	Ralph Beckett	2:13.53
2023	Abandoned due to unsafe ground
2024	Arabian Crown	William Buick	Charlie Appleby	2:12.61
2025	Swagman	Ryan Moore	Aidan O'Brien	2:10.93
2026	Raaheeb	Rossa Ryan	Owen Burrows	2:09.36

.

== See also ==
- Horse racing in Great Britain
- List of British flat horse races
- Recurring sporting events established in 1953 – this race is included under its original title, Royal Stakes.
