= James Seymour Stakes =

Flat horse race in Britain

James Seymour Stakes
2026
Arabian Light	Nahraan	Pacific Mission

Previous years
2025
Liberty Lane	Gethin	Torito
2024
Bolster	Peace Man	Eydon
2023
Checkandchallenge	Pride Of America	Greek Order
2022
Ottoman Fleet	Royal Fleet	Savvy Victory
2021
Bay Bridge	Majestic Dawn	Monty

2020-2011
2020
Freyja	Air Pilot	Marie's Diamond
2019
Lord North	Pablo Escobarr	Indeed
2018
True Self	Air Pilot	Maverick Wave
2017
Permission	Air Pilot	Boynton
2016
Energia Davos	Educate	Master The World
2015
Restorer	Quarterback	Top Notch Tonto
2014
Air Pilot	Sudden Wonder	Mutakayyef
2013
Nabucco	Proud Chieftain	Fattsota
2012
Mull Of Killough	Hajras	Rainbow Peak
2011
Slumber	Dux Scholar	Classic Punch

2010-2001
2010
Timepiece	Prince Siegfried	Nideeb
2009
Laaheb	Prince Siegfried	Saphira's Fire
2008
With Interest	Kirklees	Bronze Cannon
2007
Mashaahed	Fairmile	Pinpoint
2006
Into The Dark	Ofaraby	Kilworth
2005
Tau Ceti	Ecomium	Into The Dark
2004
Spanish Don	Menokee	Bonecrusher
2003
Far Lane	Bustan	Persian Lass
2002
Island House	Parasol	Lagudin
2001
Lagudin	Chianti	Border Arrow

2000-1991
2000
Island Sound	Man O'Mystery	Explode
1999
Little Rock	Mujahid	Monsajem
1998
Shfoug	Silence Reigns	Altaweelah
1997
Saafeya	Sandmoor Chambray	Ghalib
1996
Proper Blue	Multicoloured	Clifton Fox
1995
Quandary	Jagellon	Star of Zilzal
1994
Velvet Moon	Tom Waller	Desert Shot
1993
Meadow Pipit	Young Buster	Red Bishop
1992
Lupescu	Fair Average	Rainbow Corner
1991
Mohican Girl	Heart Of Darkness	Emperor Fountain

1990-1988
1990
Stagecraft	Philharmonia	Akamantis
1989
Icona	Rambo's Hall	Always Valiant
1988
Petrullo	Ashayer	National Service

The James Seymour Stakes is a Listed flat horse race in Great Britain open to horses aged three years or older. It is run on the Rowley Mile course at Newmarket over a distance of 1 mile and 2 furlongs (2,012 metres), and it is scheduled to take place each year in late October or early November.

The race is named in honour of the equine artist James Seymour (1702–1752).

== Winners ==
Year	Winner	Age	Jockey	Trainer	Time
1986	Riyda	3	John Reid	Fulke Johnson Houghton	2:10.34
1987	Media Starguest	3	Ray Cochrane	Luca Cumani	2:11.58
1988	Petrullo	3	John Reid	Richard Casey	2:07.46
1989	Icona	3	Greville Starkey	Michael Stoute	2:04.19
1990	Stagecraft	3	Walter Swinburn	Michael Stoute	2:05.55
1991	Mohican Girl	3	Michael Roberts	James Fanshawe	2:11.61
1992	Lupescu	4	Frankie Dettori	David Loder	2:11.85
1993	Meadow Pipit	4	Walter Swinburn	John Gosden	2:07.12
1994	Velvet Moon	3	Willie Carson	Paul Cole	2:07.04
1995	Quandary	3	Willie Ryan	Henry Cecil	2:03.53
1996	Proper Blue	3	Seb Sanders	Terry Mills	2:04.17
1997	Saafeya	3	Frankie Dettori	John Gosden	2:05.95
1998	Shfoug	3	Michael Hills	Barry Hills	2:04.30
1999	Little Rock	3	Pat Eddery	Sir Michael Stoute	2:09.50
2000	Island Sound	3	Richard Quinn	David Elsworth	2:09.47
2001	Lagudin	3	Jamie Spencer	Luca Cumani	2:07.90
2002	Island House	6	Darryll Holland	Geoff Wragg	2:07.46
2003	Far Lane	4	Richard Hughes	Barry Hills	2:04.43
2004	Spanish Don	6	Liam Keniry	David Elsworth	2:12.05
2005	Tau Ceti	6	Seb Sanders	Ralph Beckett	2:09.81
2006	Into The Dark	5	Frankie Dettori	Saeed bin Suroor	2:07.39
2007	Mashaahed	4	Richard Hills	Barry Hills	2:07.16
2008	With Interest	5	Ted Durcan	Saeed bin Suroor	2:07.00
2009	Laaheb	3	Richard Hills	Michael Jarvis	2:07.61
2010	Timepiece	3	Ian Mongan	Henry Cecil	2:11.02
2011	Slumber	3	Michael Hills	Charles Hills	2:03.21
2012	Mull Of Killough	6	George Baker	Jane Chapple-Hyam	2:07.65
2013	Nabucco	4	Robert Havlin	John Gosden	2:08.88
2014	Air Pilot	5	Graham Lee	Ralph Beckett	2:04.34
2015	Restorer	3	Andrea Atzeni	William Muir	2:07.53
2016	Energia Davos	8	George Baker	Jane Chapple-Hyam	2:04.72
2017	Permission	4	Daniel Muscutt	James Fanshawe	2:03.99
2018	True Self	5	Colin Keane	Willie Mullins	2:06.68
2019	Lord North	3	Robert Havlin	John Gosden	2:11.11
2020	Freyja	3	Ben Curtis	Mark Johnston	2:16.57
2021	Bay Bridge	3	Ryan Moore	Sir Michael Stoute	2:03.23
2022	Ottoman Fleet	3	Ryan Moore	Charlie Appleby	2:08.64
2023	Checkandchallenge	4	Callum Shepherd	William Knight	2:12.52
2024	Bolster	4	Pierre-Louis Jamin	Karl Burke	2:10.15
2025	Liberty Lane	5	Shane Grey	Karl Burke	2:06.04
2026	Arabian Light	5	Kieran Shoemark	Charlie Appleby	2:07.86

== See also ==
- Horse racing in Great Britain
- List of British flat horse races
