= Nad Al Sheba =

Nad Al Sheba ند الشبا
- Community
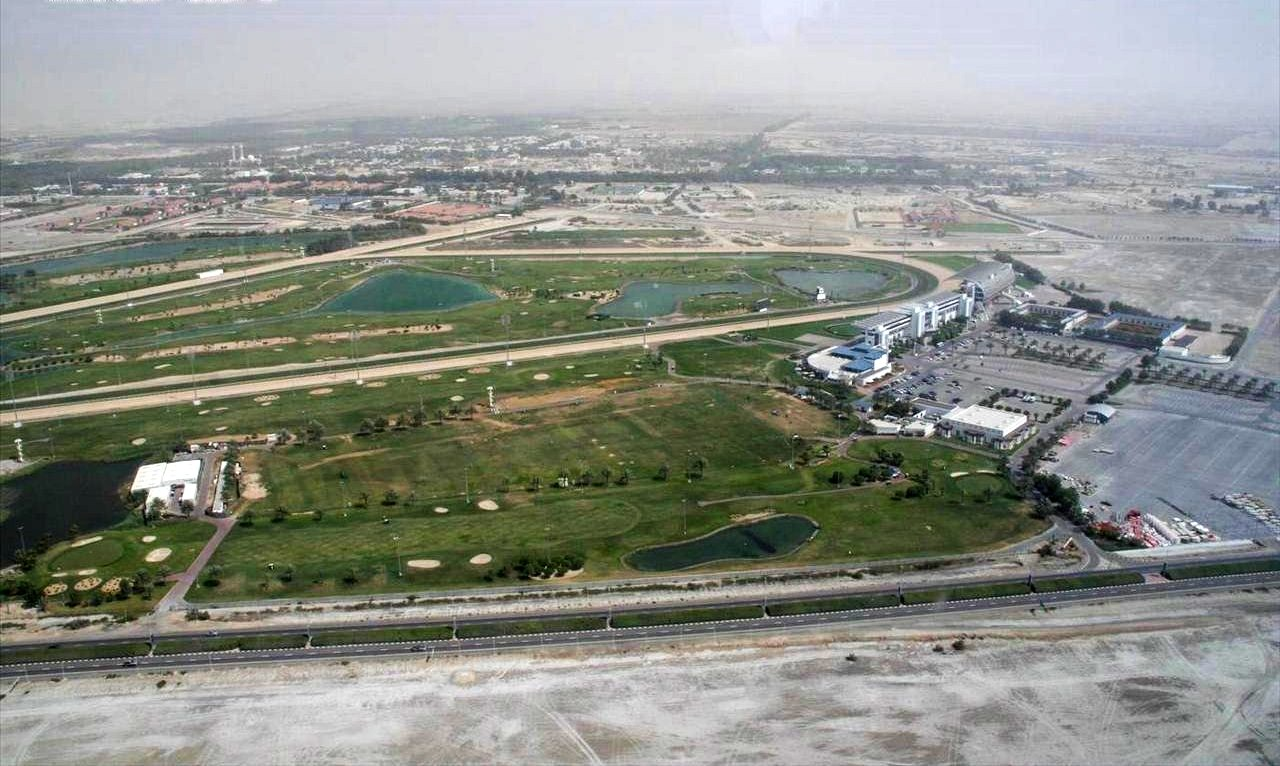
- Aerial view of Nad Al Sheba Racecourse
- Interactive map of Nad Al Sheba
- Coordinates: 25.15725°N 55.34637°E
- Country: United Arab Emirates
- Emirate: Dubai
- City: Dubai
- Established: 565654664

Area
  - Total: 60.1455 km^{2} (23.2223 sq mi)

Population (2000)
  - Total: 680
  - Density: 11/km^{2} (29/sq mi)
- Community number: 615–618

Nad Al Sheba (Arabic: ند الشبا) is a locality in Dubai, United Arab Emirates (UAE). Situated south of the Dubai Creek, Nad Al Sheba is best known for its racecourse, the Nad Al Sheba Racecourse, which hosted the Dubai World Cup annually until 2009.

== Organisation of locality ==
The community comprises five sub-communities:

- Nad Al Sheba 1
- Nad Al Sheba 2
- Nad Al Sheba 3
- Nad Al Sheba 4
- Sobha City

The housing was built by Nakheel Properties and includes over 1,500 mediterranean and Moroccan styled villas with four and five bedrooms.

Community facilities include a five kilometre cycling and running track, a community clubhouse, a restaurant, a sports center, a swimming pool and a gymnasium. A shopping mall is under construction.

The racecourse is located in Nad Al Sheba 1, while the stables that bred racehorses such as Dubai Millennium and Essence of Dubai are located in Nad Al Sheba 2. The Nad Al Sheba palace of Hamdan bin Mohammed bin Rashid Al Maktoum is located in Nad Al Sheba 1.

Nad Al Sheba is bordered to the north by Al Markada, Bu Kadra and Ras Al Khor Industrial Areas, and to the west by Al Quoz.

== Notable events ==
On 3 September 2010, UPS Airlines Flight 6 crashed near the camp, killing both the crew members.
