= Key to the Mint =

American-bred Thoroughbred racehorse

- Sire: Graustark
- Grandsire: Ribot
- Dam: Key Bridge
- Damsire: Princequillo
- Sex: Stallion
- Foaled: 1969
- Country: United States
- Colour: Bay
- Breeder: Paul Mellon
- Owner: Rokeby Stables
- Trainer: J. Elliott Burch
- Record: 29: 14-4-3
- Earnings: $576,015

Major wins
- Remsen Stakes (1971); Withers Stakes (1972); Woodward Stakes (1972); Derby Trial Stakes (1972); Brooklyn Handicap (1972); Whitney Stakes (1972); Travers Stakes (1972); Suburban Handicap (1973); Excelsior Handicap (1973)

Awards
- American Champion 3-Year-Old Colt (1972)

Key to the Mint (1969–1996) was an American Thoroughbred racehorse.

== Background ==
Bred by Paul Mellon and raced under his Rokeby Stable colors, Key to the Mint was trained by future Hall of Fame inductee Elliott Burch.

== Racing career ==
Key to the Mint did not run in the Kentucky Derby, the first race of the U.S. Triple Crown series, then finished third to winner Bee Bee Bee in the Preakness Stakes and fourth to Riva Ridge in the Belmont Stakes.

Following the Triple Crown races, Key to the Mint dominated his age group in 1972 and was voted the Eclipse Award for American Champion Three-Year-Old Male Horse. He continued to race at age four, notably winning the 1973 Excelsior Handicap and won on a sloppy track for 10 furlongs in winning the Suburban Handicap.

== Stud record ==
Retired to stud duty, Key to the Mint sired Plugged Nickle, the 1980 American Champion Sprint Horse; Java Gold, a multiple Grade 1 winner and sire of Kona Gold; and Jewel Princess, the 1996 American Champion Older Female Horse. He is also the damsire of European Champion Swain and Canadian Champion 3-Year-Old Male Horse Key to the Moon. Key to the Mint was euthanized due to infirmities of old age on September 21, 1996.

== Sire line tree ==
- Key to the Mint
  - Sauce Boat
  - Plugged Nickle
  - Gold And Ivory
  - Java Gold
    - Kona Gold
    - Access To Java
    - Boreal

== Pedigree ==
Pedigree of Key to the Mint
Sire Graustark chestnut 1963	Ribot bay 1952	Tenerani bay 1944	Bellini
Sire Graustark chestnut 1963	Ribot bay 1952	Tenerani bay 1944	Tofanella
Sire Graustark chestnut 1963	Ribot bay 1952	Romanella chestnut 1943	El Greco
Sire Graustark chestnut 1963	Ribot bay 1952	Romanella chestnut 1943	Barbara Burrini*
Sire Graustark chestnut 1963	Flower Bowl bay 1952	Alibhai bay 1938	Hyperion
Sire Graustark chestnut 1963	Flower Bowl bay 1952	Alibhai bay 1938	Teresina
Sire Graustark chestnut 1963	Flower Bowl bay 1952	Flower Bed bay 1946	Beau Pere
Sire Graustark chestnut 1963	Flower Bowl bay 1952	Flower Bed bay 1946	Boudoir
Dam Key Bridge bay 1959	Princequillo bay 1940	Prince Rose bay 1928	Rose Prince
Dam Key Bridge bay 1959	Princequillo bay 1940	Prince Rose bay 1928	Indolence
Dam Key Bridge bay 1959	Princequillo bay 1940	Cosquilla bay 1933	Papyrus*
Dam Key Bridge bay 1959	Princequillo bay 1940	Cosquilla bay 1933	Quick Thought
Dam Key Bridge bay 1959	Blue Banner bay 1952	War Admiral brown 1934	Man o' War
Dam Key Bridge bay 1959	Blue Banner bay 1952	War Admiral brown 1934	Brushup
Dam Key Bridge bay 1959	Blue Banner bay 1952	Risqué Blue bay 1941	Blue Larkspur
Dam Key Bridge bay 1959	Blue Banner bay 1952	Risqué Blue bay 1941	Risqué

* Key to the Mint is inbred 5S x 4D to the stallion Papyrus, meaning that he appears fifth generation (via Barbara Burrini) on the sire side of his pedigree and fourth generation on the dam side of his pedigree.
