= Graustark (horse) =

American Thoroughbred racehorse

- Sire: Ribot
- Grandsire: Tenerani
- Dam: Flower Bowl
- Damsire: Alibhai
- Sex: Stallion
- Foaled: 1963
- Country: United States
- Colour: Chestnut
- Breeder: John W. Galbreath
- Owner: Darby Dan Farm
- Trainer: Loyd Gentry, Jr.
- Record: 8: 7-1-0
- Earnings: $75,904

Major wins
- Arch Ward Handicap (1966); Bahamas Stakes (1966)

Awards
- Leading broodmare sire in Britain & Ireland (1985)
- Last updated on November 21, 2006

Graustark (1963–1988) was an American Thoroughbred racehorse who was a favorite to win the 1966 Kentucky Derby until an injury prematurely ended his career.

== Background ==
Bred by renowned sportsman John W. Galbreath at his Darby Dan Farm near Lexington, Kentucky, Graustark was named for the fictional country used as the setting in several early 20th century novels by George Barr McCutcheon. He was chestnut and had a stride that was believed to be at least as long as the legendary Man o' War's. Graustark's nickname was "The Big G".

Sired by European champion Ribot, Graustark was born in the same year as Ogden Phipps' future Hall of Fame colt Buckpasser.

== Racing career ==
=== 1965: two-year-old season ===
Racing at age two in 1965, Graustark competed in three races - including the Arch Ward Handicap, which he won by six lengths on a very muddy track - but an injury (shin splints) sidelined him for the rest of the year. Although he won all three of his races by wide margins, he did not compete enough to be seriously considered for the Eclipse Award for Outstanding 2-Year-Old Male Horse. Buckpasser, who won the award based on his nine wins in eleven races, went into the 1966 racing season as the early favorite for the Kentucky Derby.

=== 1966: three-year-old season ===
In early 1966, Graustark came back from his injury after five months of recuperation. Ridden by jockey Braulio Baeza (who was also Buckpasser's jockey), he made his three-year-old debut with a win in the Grenada Purse at Hialeah Park. He then began winning race after race and was soon talked about as being a serious rival to Buckpasser. At the time, Baeza considered Graustark to be the best horse he had ever ridden. He was touted as a superhorse who was likely to win the Triple Crown, thus ending the drought since Citation's win. The anticipated showdown between Buckpasser and Graustark at Churchill Downs on the first Saturday in May never happened after Buckpasser suffered a quarter crack injury and missed the U.S. Triple Crown races. Graustark then became the heavy favorite for the Derby. However, after winning seven straight races, he sustained a career-ending coffin bone break while in the lead in the Blue Grass Stakes. Racing on a very muddy track, he was in front by six lengths in the back stretch but lost by a nose to Abe's Hope (who nearly beat Buckpasser in the Flamingo Stakes). Prior to the last race, a safety pin was found stuck in Graustark's frog/hoof, but after icing he was declared fit to run.

== Stud career ==
Graustark was syndicated for a record $2.4 million, an enormous amount at the time. Standing at stud at Darby Dan Farm, he proved reasonably successful as a sire. Among his progeny were Proud Truth, Prove Out, Key To The Mint, Avatar, Caracolero, Protection Racket, Gregorian and Jim French. Graustark was also the damsire of multi-millionaire Bien Bien.

Graustark's full brother was His Majesty, who set a track record of 1:46 2/5 for 1 1/8 miles at Hialeah Park Race Track. His Majesty was also a Leading sire in North America whose offspring included Pleasant Colony, winner of the Kentucky Derby and Preakness Stakes and 1981 - 3 yo Eclipse Award Winner.

Graustark died at age 25 on August 21, 1988, and was buried in the equine cemetery at Darby Dan Farm.

== Sire line tree ==
- Graustark
  - Jim French
  - Key to the Mint
    - Sauce Boat
    - Plugged Nickle
    - Gold And Ivory
    - Java Gold
      - Kona Gold
      - Access To Java
      - Boreal
  - Prove Out
  - Prince Dantan
  - Caracolero
  - Avatar
    - Craelius
    - Prince Avatar
  - Gregorian
    - Imperial Choice
  - Protection Racket
  - Proud Truth
    - Truth Of It All
    - Di Stefano
    - Lord Gittens
    - Spago
    - Ay Papa
    - Drago
    - Volveremos
    - Memento
