= Zainta =

Irish-bred Thoroughbred racehorse

- Sire: Kahyasi
- Grandsire: Ile de Bourbon
- Dam: Zaila
- Damsire: Darshaan
- Sex: Mare
- Foaled: 3 May 1995
- Country: Ireland
- Colour: Bay
- Breeder: Aga Khan IV
- Owner: Aga Khan IV
- Trainer: Alain de Royer-Dupré
- Record: 8: 6-0-1
- Earnings: £264,242

Major wins
- Prix Vanteaux (1998); Prix Saint-Alary (1998); Prix de Diane (1998); Prix de la Nonette (1998)

Zainta (foaled 3 May 1995) was an Irish-bred, French-trained Thoroughbred racehorse and broodmare. After winning her only start as a juvenile she established herself as one of the best with five consecutive victories including the Prix Vanteaux, Prix Saint-Alary, Prix de Diane and Prix de la Nonette. She was beaten in her last two races and was retired from racing at the end of the year. She became a successful broodmare whose offspring excelled under National Hunt rules.

== Background ==
Zainta was a bay mare bred in Ireland by her owner, Aga Khan IV. She was sent into training with Alain de Royer-Dupré in France and was ridden all of her races by Gerald Mosse.

She was sired by Kahyasi, who won the Epsom Derby in 1988 before becoming a good sire of stayers, jumpers and broodmares. His other foals included Enzeli, Hasili, Khalkevi, Karasi and Vereva. Zainta's dam Zaila showed some racing ability, winning one race in France in 1991 and became a successful broodmare who also produced the Grande Course de Haies d'Auteuil winner Zaiyad. She was a granddaughter of Petite Étoile and closely related to Zarkava.

== Racing career ==
=== 1997: two-year-old season ===
Zainta made her racecourse debut in a minor race at Croisé-Laroche Racecourse near Lille over 1800 metres on 2 November in which she won by half a length from Access To Fame.

=== 1998: three-year-old season ===
On her first run as a three-year-old Zainta contested the 2000 metre Prix de Croissy on 5 April at Longchamp Racecourse and won in impressive style by five lengths. Three weeks later the filly was stepped up in class and started the 3/5 favourite for the Group 3 Prix Vanteaux over 1800 metres at Longchamp. She led from the start and stayed on well in the straight to win by a neck from Deskaheh. On 17 May at the same track Zainta, accompanied by her pacemaker Mannsara, started the 5/2 second choice in the betting behind the Prix Marcel Boussac winner Loving Claim in the Group 1 Prix Saint-Alary over 2000 metres. The best-fancied of the other six runners were Abbatiale (Prix Penelope), Deskaheh and Miscast. After being restrained by Mosse in the early stages, Zainta took the lead approaching the last 200 metres and won by a length from Loving Claim with Good Enough in third.

In the Prix de Diane over 2100 metres at Chantilly Racecourse on 7 June Zainta, again aided by Mannsara, was made the 2/5 favourite ahead of Loving Claim in an eleven-runner field which also included Good Enough, Insight and Abbatiale. In the build-up to the race, Royer-Dupre commented, "If she repeats her Saint-Alary form, Zainta should go close, but it is her fourth race of the season. She looks beautiful and I hope she's kept her form, although it's difficult to judge". She was held up by Mosse in the early stages as Mannsara duelled for the lead with Good Enough's pacemaker Freak Out, but made rapid progress to take the lead in the straight. She was overtaken by Abbatiale 200 metres out but rallied strongly to regain the advantage in the final strides and won by a short head.

After a two and a half month break, Zainta returned in the Prix de la Nonette at Deauville Racecourse on 22 August. She started odds-on favourite and took her winning streak to six as she won "easily" by a length from Bayourida. On 13 September the filly was stepped up in distance for the Prix Vermeille over 2400 metres at Longchamp when she started the 9/10 favourite but sustained her first defeat as she came home third behind the British-trained challengers Leggera and Cloud Castle. On her final racecourse appearance Zainta was matched against male opposition in the Prix de l'Arc de Triomphe over the same course and distance on 4 October but made no impact and finished thirteenth of the fourteen runners.

== Breeding record ==
At the end of her racing career, Zainta was retired to become a broodmare for the Aga Khan's stud. She produced seven foals and four winners between 2000 and 2010:

- Zainatiya, a brown filly, foaled in 2000, sired by Green Desert
- Zanjan, bay colt, 2001, by Indian Ridge. Failed to win in four races.
- Zaynar, grey colt (later gelded), 2005, by Daylami. Won six races including Triumph Hurdle.
- Zaidpour, brown colt (gelded), 2006, by Red Ransom. Won ten races including Royal Bond Novice Hurdle, Hatton's Grace Hurdle, Christmas Hurdle.
- Zaidiyna, bay filly, 2007, by Azamour. Won one race.
- Zainzana, bay filly, 2008, by Green Desert
- Zaidiyn, bay colt (gelded), 2010, by Zamindar. Won four races.

== Pedigree ==
Pedigree of Zainta (IRE), bay mare, 1995
Sire Kahyasi (IRE) 1985	Ile de Bourbon (USA); 1975	Nijinsky (CAN)	Northern Dancer
Sire Kahyasi (IRE) 1985	Ile de Bourbon (USA); 1975	Nijinsky (CAN)	Flaming Page
Sire Kahyasi (IRE) 1985	Ile de Bourbon (USA); 1975	Roseliere (FR)	Misti
Sire Kahyasi (IRE) 1985	Ile de Bourbon (USA); 1975	Roseliere (FR)	Peace Rose
Sire Kahyasi (IRE) 1985	Kadissya (USA); 1979	Blushing Groom (FR)	Red God (USA)
Sire Kahyasi (IRE) 1985	Kadissya (USA); 1979	Blushing Groom (FR)	Runaway Bride (FR)
Sire Kahyasi (IRE) 1985	Kadissya (USA); 1979	Kalkeem (IRE)	Sheshoon (GB)
Sire Kahyasi (IRE) 1985	Kadissya (USA); 1979	Kalkeem (IRE)	Gioia (GB)
Dam Zaila (IRE) 1988	Darshaan (GB); 1981	Shirley Heights	Mill Reef (USA)
Dam Zaila (IRE) 1988	Darshaan (GB); 1981	Shirley Heights	Hardiemma
Dam Zaila (IRE) 1988	Darshaan (GB); 1981	Delsy (FR)	Abdos
Dam Zaila (IRE) 1988	Darshaan (GB); 1981	Delsy (FR)	Kelty
Dam Zaila (IRE) 1988	Zahra; 1974	Habitat (USA)	Sir Gaylord
Dam Zaila (IRE) 1988	Zahra; 1974	Habitat (USA)	Little Hut
Dam Zaila (IRE) 1988	Zahra; 1974	Petite Etoile (GB)	Petition
Dam Zaila (IRE) 1988	Zahra; 1974	Petite Etoile (GB)	Star of Iran (family: 9-c)
