= Vereva =

Irish-bred Thoroughbred racehorse

- Sire: Kahyasi
- Grandsire: Ile de Bourbon
- Dam: Vearia
- Damsire: Mill Reef
- Sex: Mare
- Foaled: 11 May 1994
- Country: Ireland
- Colour: Brown
- Breeder: Aga Khan IV
- Owner: Aga Khan IV
- Trainer: Alain de Royer-Dupré
- Record: 4: 3-1-0
- Earnings: £190,797

Major wins
- Prix de Diane (1997)

Vereva (foaled 11 May 1994) was an Irish-bred, French-trained Thoroughbred racehorse and broodmare. In a brief racing career which lasted from April to August 1997 she won three of her four races. After winning minor events on her first two starts she recorded her most important victory in the Group 1 Prix de Diane. She was retired from racing after being narrowly beaten in her only subsequent race and eventually continued to have some successes at stud, being the source of multiple winners and some blacktype performers.

== Background ==
Vereva was a brown mare with a small white star bred in Ireland by her owner, Aga Khan IV. She was sent into training with Alain de Royer-Dupré in France and was ridden in three of her four races by Gerald Mosse.

She was sired by Kahyasi, who won the Epsom Derby in 1988 before becoming a good sire of stayers, jumpers and broodmares. His other foals included Enzeli, Hasili, Khalkevi, Karasi and Zainta. Vereva's dam Vearia showed fair form on the track, winning two minor races from seven starts, and became a very successful broodmare who also produced Valanour. She was a half-sister to both Vayrann and Niece Divine (the dam of Natroun).

== Racing career ==
=== 1997: three-year-old season ===
Vereva made her racecourse debut in a minor race over 2000 metres on soft ground at Chantilly Racecourse on 30 April in which she was ridden by Dominique Boeuf and won by a length from Street Lina. Mosse took over the ride when the filly contested the Prix de la Seine on 25 May 1997 at Longchamp Racecourse and came home three lengths clear of her stablemate Tashiriya.

In the Prix de Diane over 2100 metres at Chantilly Vereva was coupled in the betting with her stablemate Darashandeh and started the 2.7/1 second favourite behind the Prix Saint-Alary winner Brilliance. The other nine runners included Always Loyal (Poule d'Essai des Pouliches), Queen Maud (Prix Vanteaux), Mousse Glacee (Prix des Réservoirs) and Ryafan. She raced close behind the leaders and turned in sixth place behind the front-running Ryafan. Vereva took the lead approaching the last 200 metres and won by one and a half lengths from Mousse Glacee with Brilliance two length back in third. After the race Alain de Royer-Dupré commented "Vereva is a fast improving filly, though I wouldn't he absolutely sure that she would stay one and a half miles. The Coral-Eclipe is a possible target".

After a break of two and a half months Vereva returned for the Group 3 Prix de la Nonette over 2000 metres at Deauville Racecourse on 23 August. She was made the odds-on favourite but after taking the lead in the last 200 metres she was caught on the line and beaten a head by the British-trained Dust Dancer.

== Breeding record ==
At the end of her racing career Vereva was retired to become a mare at her owner's stud in Ireland. She produced at least six foals and three winners between 2001 and 2010:

- Vermentina, bay filly, 2001, by Darshaan. Unraced. Dam of Verema, multiple Gr.II winner.
- Vezara, bay filly, 2004, by Grand Lodge. Won two races. Dam of winners.
- Virana, bay filly, 2005, by King's Best. Winner and Listed Placed. Dam of a winner.
- Linareva, grey filly, 2007, by Linamix. Two wins from four starts.
- Foxxy Cleopatra, bay filly, 2009, by Slickly. Unraced. Dam of winners.
- Diena, bay filly, 2010, by Librettist. Unraced. Dam of winners.

== Pedigree ==
Pedigree of Vereva (IRE), brown mare, 1994
| Sire Kahyasi (IRE) 1985 | Ile de Bourbon (USA); 1975 | Nijinsky (CAN) | Northern Dancer |
| Sire Kahyasi (IRE) 1985 | Ile de Bourbon (USA); 1975 | Nijinsky (CAN) | Flaming Page |
| Sire Kahyasi (IRE) 1985 | Ile de Bourbon (USA); 1975 | Roseliere (FR) | Misti |
| Sire Kahyasi (IRE) 1985 | Ile de Bourbon (USA); 1975 | Roseliere (FR) | Peace Rose |
| Sire Kahyasi (IRE) 1985 | Kadissya (USA); 1979 | Blushing Groom (FR) | Red God (USA) |
| Sire Kahyasi (IRE) 1985 | Kadissya (USA); 1979 | Blushing Groom (FR) | Runaway Bride (FR) |
| Sire Kahyasi (IRE) 1985 | Kadissya (USA); 1979 | Kalkeem (IRE) | Sheshoon (GB) |
| Sire Kahyasi (IRE) 1985 | Kadissya (USA); 1979 | Kalkeem (IRE) | Gioia (GB) |
| Dam Vearia (IRE) 1985 | Mill Reef (USA); 1968 | Never Bend | Nasrullah (GB) |
| Dam Vearia (IRE) 1985 | Mill Reef (USA); 1968 | Never Bend | Lalun |
| Dam Vearia (IRE) 1985 | Mill Reef (USA); 1968 | Milan Mill | Princequillo (IRE) |
| Dam Vearia (IRE) 1985 | Mill Reef (USA); 1968 | Milan Mill | Virginia Water |
| Dam Vearia (IRE) 1985 | Val Divine (FR); 1971 | Val de Loir | Vieux Manoir |
| Dam Vearia (IRE) 1985 | Val Divine (FR); 1971 | Val de Loir | Vali |
| Dam Vearia (IRE) 1985 | Val Divine (FR); 1971 | Pola Bella | Darius (GB) |
| Dam Vearia (IRE) 1985 | Val Divine (FR); 1971 | Pola Bella | Bella Paola (family: 4-n) |
