= Prix de Guiche =

Flat horse race in France

- Class: Group 3
- Location: Chantilly Racecourse; Chantilly, France
- Inaugurated: 1865
- Race type: Flat / Thoroughbred
- Website: france-galop.com

Race information
- Distance: 1,800 m (1.1 mi; 8.9 furlongs)
- Surface: Turf
- Track: Right-handed
- Qualification: Three-year-old colts
- Weight: 58 kg
- Purse: €80,000 (2022); 1st: €40,000

Prix de Guiche
2024
Darlinghurst	First Look	Grecian Storm

Previous years
2023
Big Rock	Horizon Dore	Grey Tornado
2022
Vadeni	Machete	Implementation
2021
Makaloun	Millebosc	Fort Payne

2020-2011
2020
Chachnak	Hurricane Cloud	Another Sky
2019
Flop Shot	Syrtis	Insandi
2018
Intellogent	Patascoy	Glorious Journey
2017
Phelps Win	Plumatic	Stunning Spirit
2016
Almanzor	Floodlight	Gardol City
2015
Green Dispatch	De Treville	Piment Rouge
2014
Bodhi	Army Bulletin	Calling Out
2013
Dalwari	Mshawish	Triple Threat
2012
Saint Baudolino	Sofast	Mandour
2011
Absolutly Yes	Nobel Winner	Ch'Tio Bilote

2010–2001
2010
Behkabad	No Risk At All	Tip Toe
2009
Calvados Blues	Dovil Boy	Vesuve
2008
Trincot	In Chambers	Mayweather
2007
Lawman	Holocene	Chinese Whisper
2006
Boris De Deauville	Poquelin	Lateral
2005
Gold Sound	Doctor Dino	Stop Making Sense
2004
Mister Sacha	Red Tune	Charmo
2003
Marshall	Jipapibaquigrafo	Art Moderne
2002
Rouvres	Rashbag	Thattinger
2001
Mizzen Mast	Kadence	Panis

2000–1990
2000
Suances	Boutron	Beriskaio
1999
Val Royal	Fils De Viane	Tijiyr
1998
Gold Away	Mahboob	Lordmare
1997
Kirkwall	Aneysar	Varxi
1996
Martiniquais	Kalmoss	Rupert
1995
Valanour	Housamix	East Of Heaven
1994
Millkom	River Waki	Lassigny
1993
Ranger	Sin Kiang	Hawk Spell
1992
Homme De Loi	Kitwood	Luazur
1991
Balleroy	Tel Quel	Kalgrey
1990
Roi De Rome	Slew The Slewor	Anti Parasite

The Prix de Guiche is a Group 3 flat horse race in France open to three-year-old thoroughbred colts. It is run over a distance of 1,800 m (1.1 mi; 8.9 furlongs) at Chantilly in May.

== History ==
The event is named after Antoine IX (1789–1855), the Duc de Guiche (and later Duc de Gramont), who founded the successful Haras de Meudon stud farm.

The Prix de Guiche was established in 1865, and it was originally held at Longchamp. It was usually contested over 2,000 metres. It was cancelled because of the Franco-Prussian War in 1871. It was run over 2,200 metres in 1873.

The race was abandoned throughout World War I, with no running from 1915 to 1918. It was staged at Maisons-Laffitte in 1944 and 1945. It was cut to 1,950 metres in 1953.

With the exception of four editions over 1,850 metres (1963 and 1965–67), the event continued over 1,950 metres until 1986. It reverted to 1,850 metres in 1987. It was transferred to Chantilly and shortened to 1,800 metres in 2005.

The Prix de Guiche can serve as a trial for the Prix du Jockey Club. Sixteen horses have won both races. The first was Consul in 1869, and the most recent was Vadeni in 2022.

== Records ==
Leading jockey (8 wins):

- Yves Saint-Martin – Relko (1963), Jour et Nuit (1964), White Star (1965), A Tempo (1966), Antipode (1974), Top Ville (1979), Shakapour (1980), Yashgan (1984)

Leading trainer (9 wins):

- Tom Jennings – Equivoque (1866), Pompier (1868), Consul (1869), Braconnier (1876), Saint Christophe (1877), Colifichet (1878), Barde (1879), Muscadin (1880), Gourgandin (1881)

Leading owner (9 wins):

- Frédéric de Lagrange – Equivoque (1866), Pompier (1868), Consul (1869), Braconnier (1876), Saint Christophe (1877), Colifichet (1878), Barde (1879), Muscadin (1880), Gourgandin (1881)

== Winners since 1979 ==
Year	Winner	Jockey	Trainer	Owner	Time
1979	Top Ville	Yves Saint-Martin	François Mathet	Aga Khan IV	2:05.70
1980	Shakapour	Yves Saint-Martin	François Mathet	Aga Khan IV	2:05.60
1981	Silky Baby	Maurice Philipperon	John Cunnington Jr.	Zenya Yoshida
1982	Sharp Singer	Alain Lequeux	Olivier Douieb	Bruce McNall
1983	Pluralisme	Freddy Head	Alec Head	Jacques Wertheimer
1984	Yashgan	Yves Saint-Martin	Alain de Royer-Dupré	Aga Khan IV
1985	Metal Precieux	Éric Legrix	Patrick Biancone	Daniel Wildenstein
1986	Bad Conduct	Éric Legrix	Patrick Biancone	J. T. Lundy
1987	Groom Dancer	Dominique Boeuf	Tony Clout	Marvin Warner	1:55.00
1988	In Extremis	Gary W. Moore	Criquette Head	Ecurie Aland	1:56.80
1989	Val des Bois	Freddy Head	Criquette Head	Jacques Wertheimer	2:02.70
1990	Roi de Rome	Guy Guignard	Criquette Head	Ecurie Aland	2:04.80
1991	Balleroy	Éric Legrix	Jean de Roualle	Richard Eamer	1:58.20
1992	Homme de Loi	Thierry Jarnet	André Fabre	Paul de Moussac	2:00.60
1993	Ranger	William Mongil	Philippe Demercastel	Mrs P. Demercastel	2:05.70
1994	Millkom	Jean-René Dubosc	Jean-Claude Rouget	Jean-Claude Gour	1:55.50
1995	Valanour	Gérald Mossé	Alain de Royer-Dupré	Aga Khan IV	1:55.60
1996	Martiniquais	Olivier Peslier	André Fabre	Daniel Wildenstein	1:56.30
1997	Kirkwall	Thierry Jarnet	André Fabre	Khalid Abdullah	2:00.60
1998	Gold Away	Olivier Doleuze	Criquette Head	Wertheimer et Frère	1:57.30
1999	Val Royal	Olivier Peslier	André Fabre	Jean-Luc Lagardère	2:10.20
2000	Suances	José-Luis Martinez	M. Delcher Sánchez	Georgiana Cabrero	2:02.50
2001	Mizzen Mast	Olivier Doleuze	Criquette Head-Maarek	Khalid Abdullah	1:55.70
2002	Rouvres	Olivier Doleuze	Criquette Head-Maarek	Alec Head	1:55.80
2003	Marshall	Thierry Thulliez	Carlos Laffon-Parias	Alec Head	1:56.90
2004	Mister Sacha	Ioritz Mendizabal	Jean-Claude Rouget	Lagardère Family	1:57.80
2005	Gold Sound	Olivier Peslier	Carlos Laffon-Parias	Wertheimer et Frère	1:54.70
2006	Boris de Deauville	Yann Barberot	Stéphane Wattel	Magalen Bryant	1:55.20
2007	Lawman	Olivier Peslier	Jean-Marie Béguigné	Marzocco / Ciampi	1:52.50
2008	Trincot	Christophe Soumillon	Philippe Demercastel	Ecurie Bader	1:52.30
2009	Calvados Blues	Gérald Mossé	Philippe Demercastel	Malcolm Parrish	1:52.30
2010	Behkabad	Christophe Lemaire	Jean-Claude Rouget	Aga Khan IV	1:51.00
2011	Absolutly Yes	Fabien Lefebvre	Yann-Marie Porzier	Paul Sebag	1:49.10
2012	Saint Baudolino	Maxime Guyon	André Fabre	Godolphin	1:57.80
2013	Dalwari	Christophe Lemaire	Jean-Claude Rouget	Aga Khan IV	1:51.74
2014	Bodhi	Jean-Bernard Eyquem	Jean-François Bernard	Steeve Berland	1:57.06
2015	War Dispatch	Christophe Soumillon	Jean-Claude Rouget	H. Joseph Allen	1:53.45
2016	Almanzor	Christophe Soumillon	Jean-Claude Rouget	Caro / Augustin-Normand	1:53.98
2017	Phelps Win	Pierre-Charles Boudot	Henri-Alex Pantall	Nadine Chiari	1:55.53
2018	Intellogent	Pierre-Charles Boudot	Fabrice Chappet	Fiona Jean Carmichael	1:50.70
2019	Flop Shot	Maxime Guyon	André Fabre	Wertheimer et Frère	1:52.55
2020	Chachnak (Note: The 2020 race took place in June due to the COVID-19 pandemic in France)	Mickael Barzalona	Fabrice Vermeulen	Martigny / des Mouettes	1:54.12
2021	Makaloun	Christophe Soumillon	Jean-Claude Rouget	Aga Khan IV	1:53.11
2022	Vadeni	Christophe Soumillon	Jean-Claude Rouget	Aga Khan IV	1:51.00
2023	Big Rock	Aurélien Lemaitre	Christopher Head	Yeguada Centurion SL	1:55.48
2024	Darlinghurst	Christophe Soumillon	Jerome Reynier	Dubois, D'Etreham et al	1:52.81
2025	Cualificar	Alexis Pouchin	André Fabre	Godolphin	1:53.57
2026	Hawk Mountain	Christophe Soumillon	Aidan O'Brien	Smith / Tabor / Magnier	1:52.02

== Earlier winners ==
- 1865:
- 1866: Equivoque
- 1867: Ruy Blas
- 1868: Pompier
- 1869: Consul
- 1870: Heraut d'Armes
- 1871: no race
- 1872: Revigny
- 1873: Boiard
- 1874: Premier Mai
- 1875: Chassenon
- 1876: Braconnier
- 1877: Saint Christophe
- 1878: Colifichet
- 1879: Barde
- 1880: Muscadin
- 1881: Gourgandin
- 1882: Quolibet
- 1883: Frontin
- 1884: Little Duck
- 1885: Reluisant
- 1886: Luc
- 1887: Pic
- 1888: Bocage
- 1889: Phlegethon
- 1890: Pourpoint
- 1891: Ermak
- 1892: Avoir
- 1893: Oeillet
- 1894: Lahire
- 1895: Merlin
- 1896: Pas de Danse
- 1897: Castelnau
- 1898: Le Samaritain
- 1899: Fourire
- 1900: Governor
- 1901: Le Heaume
- 1902: Retz
- 1903: Tigellin
- 1904: Presto
- 1905: Avanti
- 1906: Moulins la Marche
- 1907: Dihor
- 1908: Grill Room
- 1909: Negofol
- 1910: Nuage
- 1911: Rioumajou
- 1912: Corton
- 1913: Rabble
- 1914: Kummel
- 1915–18: no race
- 1919: McKinley
- 1920: Boscobel
- 1921: Grazing
- 1922: Lamartine
- 1923: Saint Hubert
- 1924: Rabican
- 1925: Coram
- 1926: Diplomate
- 1927: Pescaro
- 1928: Montezuma
- 1929: Tuvari
- 1930: Godiche
- 1931: Nadir
- 1932: De Beers
- 1933: Minestrone
- 1934: Rentenmark
- 1935: William of Valence
- 1936: Vatellor
- 1937: Mousson
- 1938: Cavallino
- 1939: Bacchus
- 1940: no race
- 1941: Plaisir de France
- 1942: Young Phalaris
- 1943: Giaour
- 1944: Ardan
- 1945: Taiaut
- 1946: Fasano
- 1947: Koos
- 1948: Royal Drake
- 1949: Norval
- 1950: Scratch
- 1951: Sicambre
- 1952: Fine Top
- 1953: Seriphos
- 1954: Beigler Bey
- 1955: Hafiz
- 1956: Astrologue
- 1957: Saim
- 1958: Alegrador
- 1959: Saint Crespin
- 1960: Kirkes
- 1961: Freiburg
- 1962: Tremolo
- 1963: Relko
- 1964: Jour et Nuit
- 1965: White Star
- 1966: A Tempo
- 1967: Grandier
- 1968: Vaguely Noble
- 1969: Spring Song
- 1970: Stintino
- 1971: Millenium
- 1972: Vitaner
- 1973: Lisaro
- 1974: Antipode
- 1975: Orante
- 1976: Grandchant
- 1977: President
- 1978: Gay Mecene

== See also ==
- List of French flat horse races
