= Behkabad =

French-bred Thoroughbred racehorse

- Sire: Cape Cross
- Grandsire: Green Desert
- Dam: Behkara
- Damsire: Kris
- Sex: Stallion
- Foaled: 21 March 2007
- Country: France
- Colour: Brown
- Breeder: Aga Khan IV
- Owner: Aga Khan
- Trainer: Jean-Claude Rouget
- Record: 11: 6-1-2
- Earnings: £959,718

Major wins
- Prix des Chênes (2009); Prix de Guiche (2010); Grand Prix de Paris (2010); Prix Niel (2010)

Behkabad (foaled 21 March 2007) is a French Thoroughbred racehorse and sire. As a two-year-old in 2009 he was undefeated in three races including the Group 3 Prix des Chênes. In the following spring he lost his unbeaten record in the Prix Omnium II but then took the Prix de Guiche. He rebounded from a disappointing effort in the Prix du Jockey Club to win the Grand Prix de Paris and then returned in autumn to win the Prix Niel. Later that year he finished fourth when favourite for the Prix de l'Arc de Triomphe and ran third in the Breeders' Cup Turf. After finishing second on his only race as a four-year-old he was retired from racing and exported to become a breeding stallion in Japan.

== Background ==
Behkabad is a dark bay or brown horse bred in France by his owner Aga Khan IV. The colt was sent into training with Jean-Claude Rouget and was ridden in all but three of his races by Christophe Lemaire.

He was sired by Cape Cross a leading miler who won the Lockinge Stakes in 1998 and the Queen Anne Stakes in the following year. As a breeding stallion Cape Cross, who stands at the Kildangan Stud in County Kildare has had considerable success, being the sire of Ouija Board, Sea the Stars, Golden Horn and Able One. Behkabad's dam Behkara was a top-class staying mare who won the Prix Chaudenay and finished second in the Prix Royal-Oak. She was in turn a daughter of Behera an even better racemare who won the Prix Saint-Alary and ran second in the Prix de l'Arc de Triomphe. Behera was descended from the French broodmare Astana (foaled 1956) who was the ancestor of many major winners including Laurens, Daylami and Dalakhani.

== Racing career ==
=== 2009: two-year-old season ===
Behkabad made his racecourse debut in a race over 1200 metres at La Teste-de-Buch Racecourse near Bordeaux on 7 July in which he was ridden by Ioritz Mendizabal and won by a short neck from Speedy Chop. Four weeks later he was partnered by Christophe Soumillon in the 1500 metre Prix d'Etreham at Deauville Racecourse and came home first, a short neck in front of Arasin (later renamed Helene Spirit). On 19 September the colt was stepped up in class for the Group 3 Prix des Chênes over 1600 metres at Longchamp Racecourse in which he was ridden for the first time by Lemaire and started the 1.4/1 favourite against four opponents. After racing towards the rear he produced a strong late run, took the lead in the final strides and won by three quarters of a length from Arasin.

=== 2010: three-year-old season ===
On his three-year-old debut on 1 April Behkabad started odds-on favourite for the Listed Prix Omnium II over 1600 metres on heavy ground at Saint-Cloud Racecourse and finished third behind No Risk At All and Tiptoe after being given a gentle ride by Lemaire. Behkabad faced No Risk At All and Tiptoe again in the Prix de Guiche over 1800 metres at Chantilly on 10 May. He took the lead from the start, accelerated clear of the field in the straight, and held off the late charge of No Risk At All to win by a neck.

In the Prix du Jockey Club over 2100 metres at Chantilly on 6 June Behkabad started the 8/1 fourth favourite a field of 22 runners. After racing in mid-division he was hampered 600 metres out before being switched to the outside in the straight and staying on well to finish fourth behind Lope de Vega, Planteur and Pain Perdu. On 14 July, with Gérald Mossé deputising for the injured Lemaire, Behkabad was stepped up in distance for the Grand Prix de Paris over 2400 metres on very soft ground at Longchamp. In a nine-runner field he was made the 5/1 fourth choice in the betting behind Planteur, Jan Vermeer (Critérium International) and Goldwaki (Prix du Lys). After settling in third place Behkabad took the lead 500 metres from the finish and kept on strongly in the closing stages to win by three quarters of a length from Planteur with a gap of five lengths back to Jan Vermeer in third. After the race Behkabad's odds for the Prix de l'Arc de Triomphe were cut from 20/1 to 10/1.

After a break of almost two months Behkabad returned in the Group 3 Prix Niel, a race which often serves as an important trial race for the Prix de l'Arc de Triomphe. He started favourite ahead of Planteur with the best of the other five runners appearing to be the Japanese challenger Victoire Pisa. After tracking Planteur throughout the race he overtook his rival in the final strides and won by a head, with the pair finishing four lengths clear of the rest. Jean-Claude Rouget commented "He's a brave and good horse and everything went according to plan and he won well enough in the end. But this was only the comeback race and he'll be spot-on for the Arc".

On 3 October Behkabad headed the betting for the Prix de l'Arc de Triomphe at Longchamp after Lemaire opted to ride himin preference to the Aga Khan's Prix de Diane winner Sarafina. He finished fourth behind Workforce, Nakayama Festa and Sarafina, but looked somewhat unlucky, enduring a "terrible trip" which saw him repeatedly blocked when attempting to obtain a clear run in the straight. For his last run of the year the colt was sent to the United States for the Breeders' Cup Turf at Churchill Downs on 6 November. He was made a strong favourite for the race but was outpaced in the straight and came home third behind Dangerous Midge and Champ Pegasus.

In the 2010 World Thoroughbred Rankings Behkabad was assessed at 122, making him the twenty-third best horse in the world, and the tenth best three-year-old.

=== 2011: four-year-old season ===
Behkabad made his only appearance as a four-year-old in the Grand Prix de Chantilly on 5 June in which he was beaten a head by Silver Pond, to whom he was conceding seven pounds in weight.

== Stud career ==
At the end of his racing career Behkabad was exported to become a breeding stallion in Japan. By 2018 he had sired over a hundred winners but no top-class performers.

== Pedigree ==
Pedigree of Behkabad, brown stallion, 2007
Sire Cape Cross (IRE) 1994	Green Desert (USA); 1983	Danzig	Northern Dancer (CAN)
Sire Cape Cross (IRE) 1994	Green Desert (USA); 1983	Danzig	Pas De Nom
Sire Cape Cross (IRE) 1994	Green Desert (USA); 1983	Foreign Courier	Sir Ivor
Sire Cape Cross (IRE) 1994	Green Desert (USA); 1983	Foreign Courier	Courtly Dee
Sire Cape Cross (IRE) 1994	Park Appeal; 1982	Ahonoora (GB)	Lorenzaccio
Sire Cape Cross (IRE) 1994	Park Appeal; 1982	Ahonoora (GB)	Helen Nichols
Sire Cape Cross (IRE) 1994	Park Appeal; 1982	Balidaress	Balidar (GB)
Sire Cape Cross (IRE) 1994	Park Appeal; 1982	Balidaress	Innocence (GB)
Dam Bekhara (IRE) 2000	Kris (GB); 1976	Sharpen Up	Atan (USA)
Dam Bekhara (IRE) 2000	Kris (GB); 1976	Sharpen Up	Rocchetta
Dam Bekhara (IRE) 2000	Kris (GB); 1976	Doubly Sure	Reliance (FR)
Dam Bekhara (IRE) 2000	Kris (GB); 1976	Doubly Sure	Soft Angels
Dam Bekhara (IRE) 2000	Behera; 1986	Mill Reef (USA)	Never Bend
Dam Bekhara (IRE) 2000	Behera; 1986	Mill Reef (USA)	Milan Mill
Dam Bekhara (IRE) 2000	Behera; 1986	Borushka	Bustino (GB)
Dam Bekhara (IRE) 2000	Behera; 1986	Borushka	Valdavia (FR) (Family: 9-e)
