= 1987 Prix de l'Arc de Triomphe =

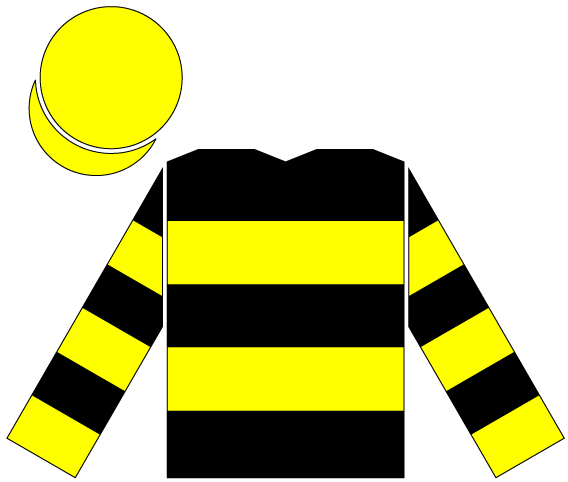
- Location: Longchamp Racecourse
- Date: October 4, 1987
- Winning horse: Trempolino

The 1987 Prix de l'Arc de Triomphe was a horse race held at Longchamp on Sunday 4 October 1987. It was the 66th running of the Prix de l'Arc de Triomphe.

The winner was Trempolino, a three-year-old colt trained in France by André Fabre. The winning jockey was Pat Eddery.

The winning time of 2m 26.3s set a new record for the race. The previous record of 2m 27.7s was achieved by Dancing Brave in 1986.

== Race details ==
- Sponsor: Trusthouse Forte
- Purse: 6,800,000 F; First prize: 4,000,000 F
- Going: Good to Firm
- Distance: 2,400 metres
- Number of runners: 11
- Winner's time: 2m 26.3s (new record)

== Full result ==
| Pos. | Marg. | Horse | Age | Jockey | Trainer (Country) |
|---|---|---|---|---|---|
| 1 | | Trempolino | 3 | Pat Eddery | André Fabre (FR) |
| 2 | 2 | Tony Bin | 4 | Cash Asmussen | Luigi Camici (ITY) |
| 3 | 3 | Triptych | 5 | Tony Cruz | Patrick Biancone (FR) |
| 4 | hd | Mtoto | 4 | Michael Roberts | Alec Stewart (GB) |
| 5 | 3 | Tabayaan | 3 | Walter Swinburn | Alain de Royer-Dupré (FR) |
| 6 | 2½ | Orban | 4 | Greville Starkey | Henry Cecil (GB) |
| 7 | 5 | Teresa | 3 | Gary W. Moore | Eric Castela (FR) |
| 8 | 5 | Reference Point | 3 | Steve Cauthen | Henry Cecil (GB) |
| 9 | 1½ | Natroun | 3 | Yves Saint-Martin | Alain de Royer-Dupré (FR) |
| 10 | nse | Sharaniya | 4 | Alain Lequeux | Alain de Royer-Dupré (FR) |
| 11 | 2½ | Groom Dancer | 3 | Dominique Boeuf | Tony Clout (FR) |

- Abbreviations: nse = nose; hd = head

== Winner's details ==
Further details of the winner, Trempolino.

- Sex: Colt
- Foaled: 17 March 1984
- Country: United States
- Sire: Sharpen Up; Dam: Trephine (Viceregal)
- Owner: Paul de Moussac
- Breeder: Marystead Farm
