= Valanour =

Irish-bred Thoroughbred racehorse

- Sire: Lomond
- Grandsire: Northern Dancer
- Dam: Vearia
- Damsire: Mill Reef
- Sex: Stallion
- Foaled: 20 March 1992
- Country: Ireland
- Colour: Bay
- Breeder: Aga Khan IV
- Owner: Aga Khan IV
- Trainer: Alain de Royer-Dupré
- Record: 9: 5-0-0
- Earnings: £282,642

Major wins
- Prix de Guiche (1995); Grand Prix de Paris (1995); Prix d'Harcourt (1996); Prix Ganay (1996)

Valanour (20 March 1992 – March 2018) was an Irish-bred, French-trained Thoroughbred racehorse and sire. He did not race as a juvenile but as a three-year-old in 1995 he was one of the best colts of his generation in France, winning three races including the Prix de Guiche and the Grand Prix de Paris. In the following spring he won the Prix d'Harcourt and the Prix Ganay but was unplaced in his last two races and was retired at the end of the year with a record of five wins from nine starts. He had limited success as a breeding stallion and died in 2018.

== Background ==
Valanour was a bay horse with no white markings bred in Ireland by his owner, Aga Khan IV. She was sent into training with Alain de Royer-Dupré in France and was ridden in all of his races by Gerald Mosse.

He was one of the best racehorses sired by Lomond, an American-bred half-brother of Seattle Slew who won the 2000 Guineas in 1983 when trained in Ireland by Vincent O'Brien. Lomond's other foals included Marling and Dark Lomond. Valanour's dam Vearia showed fair form on the track, winning two minor races from seven starts, and became a very successful broodmare who also produced the Prix de Diane winner Vereva. She was a half-sister to both Vayrann and Niece Divine (the dam of Natroun).

== Racing career ==
=== 1995: three-year-old season ===
After being unraced as a juvenile Valanour began his racing career with a four length win in the Prix Ajax over 1600 metres at Saint-Cloud Racecourse on 14 April 1995. Three weeks later the colt was stepped up in class and distance for the Group 3 Prix de Guiche over 1800 metres at Longchamp Racecourse and started favourite ahead of five opponents including Housamix (winner of the Prix Thomas Bryon). After racing in second place behind the pacemaker Secret And Fair Valanour took the lead in the straight, accelerated into a clear lead and kept on well to win by a length from Housamix.

On 4 June Valanour started favourite for the Group 1 Prix Jean Prat at Chantilly Racecourse but after turning into the straight in second place he came home sixth of the seven runners, two lengths behind the winner Torrential. Three weeks later at Longchamp the colt contested the Grand Prix de Paris over 2000 metres and started at odds of 6.3/1 in a ten-runner field. His opponents included Torrential, Poliglote (Critérium de Saint-Cloud), Diamond Mix (Prix Greffulhe), Singspiel, Gold And Steel (Prix de La Jonchere) and Bobinski (Prix Matchem). Valanour was among the leaders from the start and made the final turn in second place behind the front-running Gold And Steel. He went to the front 400 metres from the finish, went two lengths clear of the field and held off the late challenge of Singspiel to win by a neck.

In September Valanour was sent to Ireland for the Irish Champion Stakes over ten furlongs at Leopardstown Racecourse. After being in contention for most of the way he faded in the straight and came home sixth of the eight runner behind Pentire.

=== 1996: four-year-old season ===
Valanour began his second campaign in the Group 2 Prix d'Harcourt over 2000 metres at Longchamp on 7 April and was made the 2.9/1 third choice in the betting behind Gunboat Diplomacy (Prix Noailles) and Marildo (Prix Ganay) in a six-runner field which also included Housamix and Carling (Prix de Diane). He raced close behind the leaders before going to the front 200 metres from the finish and won by one and a half lengths and a short neck from Carling and Housamix. Three weeks later at the same track Valanour started the 1.2/1 favourite for the Group 1 Prix Ganay over 2100 metres. The ten-runner field included his previous rivals Carling, Diamond Mix and Marildo a well as Swain, Spectrum, Luso (Derby Italiano) and Muncie (Prix Saint-Alary). Valanour was settled in fifth place and after briefly struggling to obtain a clear passage he produced a strong run in the straight. He took the lead in the last 200 metres and kept on well to win by half a length from Luso with Swain a neck away in third.

On 6 July Valanour made his first appearance outside France when he contested the Eclipse Stakes over ten furlongs at Sandown Park. He never looked likely to win and finished sixth of the seven runners behind Halling. The colt was then sent to the United States for the Arlington Million on 25 August but made little impact and came home eighth of the nine runners in a race won by Mecke.

== Stud record ==
At the end of his racing career Valanour was retired to come a breeding stallion in France. He sired many minor winners both on the flat and over jumps but few top-class performers. The most successful of his offspring included Voix du Nord (Critérium de Saint-Cloud, Prix Lupin), Valentino (Prix Perth) and Bayamo (American Handicap). He was euthanised at the Haras de la Folie in March 2018.

== Pedigree ==
Pedigree of Valanour (IRE), bay stallion, 1992
Sire Lomond (USA) 1980	Northern Dancer (CAN); 1961	Nearctic	Nearco (ITY)
Sire Lomond (USA) 1980	Northern Dancer (CAN); 1961	Nearctic	Lady Angela (GB)
Sire Lomond (USA) 1980	Northern Dancer (CAN); 1961	Natalma (USA)	Native Dancer
Sire Lomond (USA) 1980	Northern Dancer (CAN); 1961	Natalma (USA)	Almahmoud
Sire Lomond (USA) 1980	My Charmer; 1969	Poker	Round Table
Sire Lomond (USA) 1980	My Charmer; 1969	Poker	Glamour
Sire Lomond (USA) 1980	My Charmer; 1969	Fair Charmer	Jet Action
Sire Lomond (USA) 1980	My Charmer; 1969	Fair Charmer	Myrtle Charm
Dam Vearia (IRE) 1985	Mill Reef (USA); 1968	Never Bend	Nasrullah (GB)
Dam Vearia (IRE) 1985	Mill Reef (USA); 1968	Never Bend	Lalun
Dam Vearia (IRE) 1985	Mill Reef (USA); 1968	Milan Mill	Princequillo (IRE)
Dam Vearia (IRE) 1985	Mill Reef (USA); 1968	Milan Mill	Virginia Water
Dam Vearia (IRE) 1985	Val Divine (FR); 1971	Val de Loir	Vieux Manoir
Dam Vearia (IRE) 1985	Val Divine (FR); 1971	Val de Loir	Vali
Dam Vearia (IRE) 1985	Val Divine (FR); 1971	Pola Bella	Darius (GB)
Dam Vearia (IRE) 1985	Val Divine (FR); 1971	Pola Bella	Bella Paola (family: 4-n)
