= Valyra (horse) =

British-bred Thoroughbred racehorse

- Racing silks of Aga Khan
- Sire: Azamour
- Grandsire: Night Shift
- Dam: Valima
- Damsire: Linamix
- Sex: Filly
- Foaled: 3 May 2009
- Country: Great Britain
- Colour: Bay
- Breeder: HH Aga Khan IV
- Owner: HH Aga Khan IV
- Trainer: Jean-Claude Rouget
- Record: 3: 3-0-0
- Earnings: £494,917

Major wins
- Prix de Diane (2012)

Valyra (3 May 2009 – 29 August 2012) was a British–bred, French-trained Thoroughbred racehorse owned by HH Aga Khan IV and trained by Jean-Claude Rouget. She won the 2012 Prix de Diane, but died in an accident later in the year.

== Breeding ==
Valyra was the daughter of King George VI and Queen Elizabeth Stakes winner Azamour. Her dam, Valima, won the Listed Prix Imprudence and is a daughter of Poule d'Essai des Poulains winner Linamix.

== Racing career ==
Valyra did not race as a two-year-old and made her first racecourse appearance on 14 April 2012 at Bordeaux Le Bouscat Racecourse, when she won by three quarters of a length from Glowing Cloud. She then won a conditions race at Chantilly by three lengths form O'Keefe. Valyra started the Prix de Diane as a 25/1 outsider, with Poule d'Essai des Pouliches winner Beauty Parlour starting as the 5/6 favourite. Jockey Johnny Murtagh settled Valyra near the rear of the 12-runner field in the early stages of the race. She quickened with 2 furlongs left to run and challenged the leader, Beauty Parlour, with 150 yards remaining. She took the lead with 120 yards left and ran on to win by three quarters of a length from Beauty Parlour, with Rjwa a further three lengths back in third place. On 29 August she sustained a hind leg fracture when cantering on the beach at Deauville and was put down. Her trainer Jean-Claude Rouget said "It is a terrible accident and a great loss for His Highness the Aga Khan and our stable. We have lost a filly with true class. She was a very sound individual and a pleasure to train." At the time she was priced at about 12/1 for the Prix de l'Arc de Triomphe.

== Pedigree ==
Pedigree of Valyra (GB), bay filly, 2009
Sire Azamour (IRE) 2001	Night Shift (USA); 1980	Northern Dancer	Nearctic
Sire Azamour (IRE) 2001	Night Shift (USA); 1980	Northern Dancer	Natalma
Sire Azamour (IRE) 2001	Night Shift (USA); 1980	Ciboulette	Chop Chop
Sire Azamour (IRE) 2001	Night Shift (USA); 1980	Ciboulette	Windy Answer
Sire Azamour (IRE) 2001	Asmara (USA); 1993	Lear Fan	Roberto
Sire Azamour (IRE) 2001	Asmara (USA); 1993	Lear Fan	Wac
Sire Azamour (IRE) 2001	Asmara (USA); 1993	Anaza	Darshaan
Sire Azamour (IRE) 2001	Asmara (USA); 1993	Anaza	Azaarika
Dam Valima (FR) 2002	Linamix (FR); 1987	Mendez	Bellypha
Dam Valima (FR) 2002	Linamix (FR); 1987	Mendez	Miss Carina
Dam Valima (FR) 2002	Linamix (FR); 1987	Lunadix	Breton
Dam Valima (FR) 2002	Linamix (FR); 1987	Lunadix	Lutine
Dam Valima (FR) 2002	Vadlawysa (IRE); 1995	Always Fair	Danzig
Dam Valima (FR) 2002	Vadlawysa (IRE); 1995	Always Fair	Carduel
Dam Valima (FR) 2002	Vadlawysa (IRE); 1995	Vadlava	Bikala
Dam Valima (FR) 2002	Vadlawysa (IRE); 1995	Vadlava	Vadsa (Family: 20-d)

== See also ==
- List of leading Thoroughbred racehorses
