= Kahyasi =

Irish-bred, Thoroughbred racehorse (1985–2008)

- Second colours of the Aga Khan
- Sire: Ile de Bourbon
- Grandsire: Nijinsky
- Dam: Kadissya
- Damsire: Blushing Groom
- Sex: Stallion
- Foaled: 2 April 1985
- Country: Ireland
- Colour: Bay
- Breeder: HH Aga Khan IV
- Owner: HH Aga Khan IV
- Trainer: Luca Cumani
- Record: 7: 5-1-0
- Earnings: £627,800

Major wins
- Lingfield Derby Trial (1988); Epsom Derby (1988); Irish Derby (1988); Timeform rating: 130
- Last updated on 21 October 2023

Kahyasi (2 April 1985 – 12 June 2008) was an Irish-bred, British-trained Thoroughbred racehorse. He won the first five races of his seven-race career, including the Epsom Derby and the Irish Derby as a three-year-old in 1988.

== Background ==
Kahyasi was a small dark-coated bay horse bred by his owner HH Aga Khan IV at his stud in Ireland. His sire, Ile de Bourbon, was best known for his win in the 1978 King George VI and Queen Elizabeth Stakes. Kahyasi was trained by Luca Cumani at his Bedford House stable Newmarket, Suffolk during his racing career and was ridden in all his races by Ray Cochrane.

== Racing career ==
Kahyasi made his three-year-old debut in the Harvester Stakes at Sandown in April. He started the 2/5 favourite and won by two lengths from his five opponents, to whom he was conceding five pounds. On his next start two weeks later he was moved up to Group Three class for the Lingfield Derby Trial. He again started odds-on favourite and won by two lengths from Insan.

At Epsom on 1 June, Kahyasi started the 11/1 fifth favourite in a field of fourteen for the 209th running of the Epsom Derby. He carried the Aga Khan's chocolate and green second colours, with the first colours being worn by Walter Swinburn on the 2000 Guineas winner Doyoun. Kahyasi broke slowly and was held up by Cochrane in the early stages before making steady progress in the straight. He was switched to the outside to take the lead a furlong from the finish and ran on well to win by one and a half lengths from Glacial Storm, with Doyoun third. At the end of the month, Kahyasi started odds-on favourite for the Irish Derby at the Curragh. He appeared to be struggling at half way and was still well behind entering the straight. Under a strong ride from Cochrane, he caught the long-time leader Insan in the last strides to win by a short head. It was subsequently revealed that he had been struck into by another horse during the race and had won despite sustaining a leg injury.

Kahyasi prepared for a run in the Prix de l'Arc de Triomphe by contesting the Prix Niel at Longchamp in September. He suffered the first defeat of his career as he was beaten a neck by the Grand Prix de Paris winner Fijar Tango. In the Arc three weeks later, Kahyasi finished sixth of the twenty-four runners, beaten just over two lengths by Tony Bin.

== Stud record ==
Kahyasi undertook stud duties at the Aga's Ballymany Stud in Ireland. He was later moved to stand at the Haras de Bonneval in Normandy when he was put down on 12 June 2008 at the age of 23 after being diagnosed as suffering from a tumour. On hearing of Kahyasi's death, Cumani paid tribute to his Derby winner, calling him "a great horse and a great friend."

At stud, he sired over 55 graded stakes winners including.

- Darasin, Goodwood Cup G2
- Enzeli, Ascot Gold Cup G1, Doncaster Cup G2
- Hasili, outstanding broodmare
- Karasi, Geelong Cup, Nakayama Grand Jump x 3
- Khalkevi, Grand Prix de Paris G1
- Vereva, Prix de Diane G1
- Zainta, Prix de Diane G1
- Nazirali, San Luis Obispo Handicap (2002) G2

Through his unraced daughter Zarkasha, Kahyasi is the damsire of the Prix de l'Arc de Triomphe winner Zarkava and the Triumph Hurdle winner Zarkandar. Kahyasi won the 2008 French broodmare sire title ahead of Sadler's Wells, Linamix and Kaldoun.
