= Zarkava =

Irish-bred, French-trained Thoroughbred racehorse

- Racing silks of Aga Khan
- Sire: Zamindar (USA)
- Grandsire: Gone West
- Dam: Zarkasha
- Damsire: Kahyasi
- Sex: Mare
- Foaled: 2005
- Country: Ireland
- Colour: Bay
- Breeder: HH Aga Khan IV
- Owner: HH Aga Khan IV
- Trainer: Alain de Royer-Dupré
- Record: 7: 7-0-0
- Earnings: €3.364.620

Major wins
- Prix Marcel Boussac (2007); Prix de la Grotte (2008); Poule d'Essai des Pouliches (2008); Prix de Diane (2008); Prix Vermeille (2008); Prix de l'Arc de Triomphe (2008)

Awards
- European Horse of the Year (2008); European Champion 3-Y-O Filly (2008); French Horse Racing Hall of Fame (2025); Timeform rating: 133
- Last updated on 25 May 2023

Zarkava (foaled 31 March 2005) is an undefeated Irish-bred, French-trained Thoroughbred racehorse who won the Prix de l'Arc de Triomphe and the French Fillies Triple Crown in 2008.

== Background ==
Zarkava was a bay mare with faint star marking, 2 white fetlock markings on both of her left legs and a pastern marking on her right hind leg, bred in Ireland by HH Aga Khan IV.

Zarkava was sired by Group II winner Zamindar who also sired the multiple Group One winner, Darjina. Out of the mare, Zarkasha, her damsire is Kahyasi, winner of the 1988 Epsom and Irish Derbys.

== Racing career ==
=== 2007: two year old season ===
Zarkava made two starts as a two-year-old at Longchamp Racecourse, her home base in Paris for trainer Alain de Royer-Dupré. She won the Prix de la Cascade for maiden fillies, and the Group One Prix Marcel Boussac. She was ridden by Christophe Soumillon, who rode her in all her races.

=== 2008: three year old season ===
In 2008, she made her three-year-old debut in April at Longchamp with a win in the Group 3 Prix de la Grotte. She followed that with a win in the Poule d'Essai des Pouliches, setting a new stakes record. She then won the Prix de Diane at Chantilly Racecourse in June.

Back at Longchamp in September, she raced in the 2,400 metre Prix Vermeille. After stumbling out of the starting gate and losing at least a dozen lengths to the leaders, she went from last to first and won by two lengths while equaling the stakes record, becoming the 4th horse since Allez France in 1973 to win the French Fillies Triple Crown. As of 2026, she is the last horse to accomplish this feat. She made her next start in the 2008 Prix de l'Arc de Triomphe on October 5. Even though it was her first race against colts and many questioned her ability to win after her tardy start in the Prix Vermeille, Zarkava was the betting favorite leading up to the Arc, and made a powerful stretch drive to become the first filly in fifteen years to win the race. Zarkava was retired on October 13 with an undefeated record.

On November 17 she was named Cartier Horse of the Year. The Aga Khan noted in a video interview posted on the website of the Daily Telegraph that they had been working since the Prix Vermeille to get this quirky filly to leave from a state of relaxation in the gate and run in a more relaxed mode at the start of her races instead of getting all tied up. He also said Zarkava had matured at three and did not get into her pace as quickly as she did at two. The Aga Khan called her an exceptional racehorse in a year of exceptional horses; and that her quality was identified very early, resulting in being placed in Group 1 races after her maiden win. In the interview, he also stated that his daughter, Princess Zahra, was deeply involved in the breeding of Zarkava, as well as the Aga Khan's other horses. The Aga Khan has been quoted in story after story as saying that Zarkava represents the apogee of the more than ninety years that his family had been breeding champion Thoroughbred racehorses.

== Breeding career ==
The first foal for Zarkava was a filly by Dalakhani foaled on 6 February 2010 at Gilltown Stud in Kilcullen, Ireland who was subsequently named Zerkaza.

On 11 February 2011 she produced a bay colt by 2009 Epsom Derby, 2000 Guineas and Prix de l'Arc de Triomphe winner, European Champion 3-year-old and No.1 World Ranked Racehorse Sea the Stars at the Aga Khan's Haras de Bonneval stud in Normandy, France. The colt, named Zarkash, was described as "a strong colt who looks like his sire and is very correct.", and was priced at 50–1 to win the 2014 Epsom Derby after his birth, but never made it onto a racecourse.

2010 Zerkaza (IRE) - a filly by Dalakhani (IRE) foaled on February 6. She is unraced, but has foaled a Exceed and Excel filly called Zerenda who is unraced, and a Sea the Stars (IRE) colt called Zeyrek who has won two of four starts.

2011 Zarkash (FR), a bay colt by Sea The Stars (IRE) foaled February 11. He is unraced and was trained by Alain de Royer-Dupré at Chantilly but broke a leg during training on 22 October 2014 and had to be euthanized.

2012 Zarkar, a colt by Galileo (IRE) He is unraced and stood at stud in Argentina for a year before being euthanized on 4 May 2017 after fracturing a tibia in a paddock accident

2013 Zarak (FR), a colt by Dubawi (IRE) foaled March 1. He raced from 2015–2017 and retired in 2018. He had 4 wins in 13 starts. He had one Grade 1 win and one Grade 3 win, two Grade 1 second places and one Grade 2 second place, one Grade 2 third place, two Grade 1 fourth places, two Grade 1 fifth places, and one Grade 1 tenth place finish in his final race.

2014 Zarmitan (FR), a bay colt by Redoute's Choice (AUS) foaled March 10. He was expected to debut at St Cloud in June 2017.

2015 Zarkamiya (FR), a filly by Frankel (GB). She won her debut on April 19, 2018 at Longchamp

2016 Zarkallani (FR), a colt by Invincible Spirit (IRE)

2017 Zaykava (FR), a bay filly by Siyouni (FR) foaled March 21

2018 Zaskar, colt by Sea The Stars (IRE) foaled in March. He is unraced

2019, filly by Dubawi (IRE)

== Honours ==
As of November 2008, Zarkava was ranked #2 racehorse in the world by the International Federation of Horse Racing Authorities (www.IFHAonline.org) and #1 in the world by RaceHorseOwner.com.

Timeform announced that they rated Zarkava at 133 after the Arc, making her the joint-best filly or mare in the last 20 years and joint-seventh in the last 40 years. This was significantly higher than the official rating, but Phil Smith, the senior British Horseracing Authority handicapper, explained that it was like comparing apples and oranges.

"We look at the facts and make our assessment in an historical context", he said. "We're not trying to speculate. We think Zarkava is exceptionally good, and we think our figure reflects that. We're also constantly updating our list of the 50 top horses, and she is joint-second (with Duke Of Marmalade) on 127, only 3lb behind the top-rated, Curlin. Many forget she was receiving a 3lb sex allowance, which if applied to our list, would bring her out as the same horse as Curlin [as the #1 rated horse in the world].

Zarkava won the horseraceinsider.com prize, Most Under-Appreciated Significant Victory of 2008 Insider Award, for her defeat of older males in the Prix de l'Arc de Triomphe.

Zarkava was named European Horse of the Year at the 2008 Cartier Racing Awards.

== Pedigree ==
Pedigree of Zarkava, bay mare, 2005
Sire Zamindar (USA)	Gone West	Mr. Prospector	Raise a Native
Sire Zamindar (USA)	Gone West	Mr. Prospector	Gold Digger
Sire Zamindar (USA)	Gone West	Secretame	Secretariat
Sire Zamindar (USA)	Gone West	Secretame	Tamerett
Sire Zamindar (USA)	Zaizafon	The Minstrel	Northern Dancer
Sire Zamindar (USA)	Zaizafon	The Minstrel	Fleur
Sire Zamindar (USA)	Zaizafon	Mofida	Right Tack
Sire Zamindar (USA)	Zaizafon	Mofida	Wold Lass
Dam Zarkasha	Kahyasi	Ile de Bourbon	Nijinsky II
Dam Zarkasha	Kahyasi	Ile de Bourbon	Roseliere
Dam Zarkasha	Kahyasi	Kadissya	Blushing Groom
Dam Zarkasha	Kahyasi	Kadissya	Kalkeen
Dam Zarkasha	Zarkana	Doyoun	Mill Reef
Dam Zarkasha	Zarkana	Doyoun	Dumka
Dam Zarkasha	Zarkana	Zarna	Shernazar
Dam Zarkasha	Zarkana	Zarna	Zahra

== See also ==
- List of leading Thoroughbred racehorses
