= Reckless Abandon (horse) =

British-bred Thoroughbred racehorse

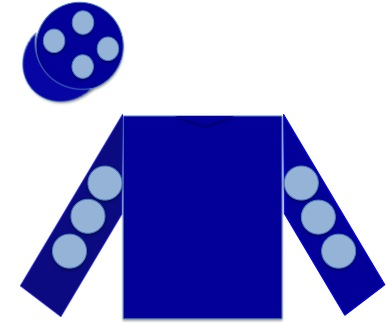
- Don Deadman Racing Silks
- Sire: Exchange Rate
- Grandsire: Danzig
- Dam: Sant Elena
- Damsire: Efisio
- Sex: Gelding
- Foaled: 2010 (age 14–15)
- Country: United Kingdom
- Breeder: Car Colston Hall Stud
- Owner: Julie Deadman & Stephen Barrow; Darley Racing; Godolphin
- Trainer: Clive Cox; Charlie Appleby
- Record: 11:5-1-2
- Earnings: £399,414

Major wins
- Norfolk Stakes (2012); Prix Robert Papin (2012); Prix Morny (2012); Middle Park Stakes (2012)

Awards
- Equal top-rated British two-year-old (2012)

Reckless Abandon (foaled 28 March 2010) is a retired British Thoroughbred racehorse. In a racing career which began in May 2012 he won all five of his first-season races including the Norfolk Stakes at Royal Ascot, the Prix Morny at Deauville and the Middle Park Stakes at Newmarket. He ended the European season as one of the year's most highly rated two-year-olds. He had training problems in the following season and failed to win although he ran well in several major sprint races. He was retired to stud at the end of 2013 but after having fertility problems returned to the track for three races in 2014.

== Background ==
Reckless Abandon is a bay gelding with a white star bred at the Car Colston Hall Stud in Nottinghamshire. He is one of the best horses to date sired by the American stallion Exchange Rate, whose other progeny include the Apple Blossom Handicap winner Ermine.

In September 2011 Reckless Abandon was sent to the Doncaster yearling sale where he was bought for £24,000 by the trainer Clive Cox. The colt passed into the joint ownership of Julie Deadman and Stephen Barrow. Cox took the horse into training at his Beechdown Farm stable at Lambourn in Berkshire. Reckless Abandon's Fan Club currently consists of many members, and is chaired by his biggest fans Jack Lamport and Matthew Bottrill, who have links with relation Robert Barrow.

== Racing career ==
=== 2012: two-year-old season ===
Reckless Abandon made his debut on 19 May in a maiden race at Doncaster Racecourse in which he started at odds of 6/1 in a field of eighteen runners. Ridden by Adam Kirby he led from the start and won by two lengths despite drifting to the left in the closing stages.

A month after his Doncaster win, Reckless Abandon was moved up in class to contest the Group Two Norfolk Stakes at Royal Ascot. He went to the front inside the last quarter mile but veered badly to the left and was headed by the Aidan O'Brien-trained Gale Force Ten, before rallying in the closing stages to win by three quarters of a length. In July, Reckless Abandon was sent to France to contest the Group Two Prix Robert Papin at Maisons-Laffitte Racecourse. Ridden for the first time by Gerald Mosse, he took an early lead and was never seriously challenged, winning by one and a half lengths from Sir Prancealot. Reckless Abandon returned to France in August for the Group One Prix Morny at Deauville. Mosse sent the colt into the lead from the start and after opening up a clear advantage he held on in the closing stages to win by three quarters of a lengths from George Vancouver. Cox called the colt's victory "a good solid performance".

In September 2012 Reckless Abandon was purchased by Darley Racing in a transaction that included his being leased back to Deadman and Barrow until the end of 2013.

On his final appearance of the year, Reckless Abandon contested the Group One Middle Park Stakes at Newmarket Racecourse on 13 October. He started 9/4 joint favourite alongside Moohaajim, a colt who had finished only fifth in the Prix Morny but who had since won the Mill Reef Stakes at Newbury. Reckless Abandon took the lead in the early stages but was overtaken by Moohaajim inside the final furlong. He rallied "very gamely" to regain the advantage in the last strides and won by a neck.

In the 2012 European Thoroughbred Racehorse Rankings, he was given a rating of 117, placing him in equal third, seven pounds below the top-rated Dawn Approach and level with Olympic Glory as the best British-trained two-year-old.

=== 2013: three-year-old season ===
Reckless Abandon began his three-year-old career in the Temple Stakes at Haydock Park Racecourse on 25 May. In a closely contested finish he sustained his first defeat as he finished third to Kingsgate Native. Four weeks later, Reckless Abandon contested the King's Stand Stakes at Royal Ascot. He led the field approaching the final furlong, but was overtaken in the closing stages and finished fifth of the nineteen runners, two lengths behind the winner Sole Power. Reckless Abandon was forced out of the July Cup by an abscess and missed the Haydock Sprint Cup through lameness. He eventually returned in the Prix de l'Abbaye at Longchamp in October when he finished fifth of the twenty runners behind Maarek.

=== Retirement ===
On 14 October it was announced that Reckless Abandon would be retired from racing and would begin his stud career at the Kildangan Stud, County Kildare in 2014. In April 2014 it was announced that the horse had experienced fertility problems and had been withdrawn from stud.

=== 2014: four-year-old season ===
After being gelded Reckless Abandon returned to training and joined the stable of Charlie Appleby in Newmarket. He made a promising comeback in August when he finished a close third to Tropics in the Listed Hopeful Stakes at Newmarket. In September he started favourite for the Scarbrough Stakes at Doncaster and finished second of the eleven runners, beaten two and a quarter lengths by the three-year-old filly Mecca's Angel. On his final appearance he ran poorly when finishing unplaced in the Bengough Stakes at Ascot on 4 October.

== Second retirement ==
After being retired for a second time Reckless Abandon was retrained to become a polo pony.

== Pedigree ==
Pedigree of Reckless Abandon (GB), bay gelding, 2010
| Sire Exchange Rate (USA) 1997 | Danzig; 1977 | Northern Dancer | Nearctic |
| Sire Exchange Rate (USA) 1997 | Danzig; 1977 | Northern Dancer | Natalma |
| Sire Exchange Rate (USA) 1997 | Danzig; 1977 | Pas de Nom | Admiral's Voyage |
| Sire Exchange Rate (USA) 1997 | Danzig; 1977 | Pas de Nom | Petitioner |
| Sire Exchange Rate (USA) 1997 | Sterling Pound; 1991 | Seeking the Gold | Mr. Prospector |
| Sire Exchange Rate (USA) 1997 | Sterling Pound; 1991 | Seeking the Gold | Con Game |
| Sire Exchange Rate (USA) 1997 | Sterling Pound; 1991 | Spectacular Bev | Spectacular Bid |
| Sire Exchange Rate (USA) 1997 | Sterling Pound; 1991 | Spectacular Bev | Bev Bev |
| Dam Sant Elena (GB) 2003 | Efisio; 1982 | Formidable | Forli |
| Dam Sant Elena (GB) 2003 | Efisio; 1982 | Formidable | Native Partner |
| Dam Sant Elena (GB) 2003 | Efisio; 1982 | Eldoret | High Top |
| Dam Sant Elena (GB) 2003 | Efisio; 1982 | Eldoret | Bamburi |
| Dam Sant Elena (GB) 2003 | Argent du Bois; 1996 | Silver Hawk | Roberto |
| Dam Sant Elena (GB) 2003 | Argent du Bois; 1996 | Silver Hawk | Gris Vitesse |
| Dam Sant Elena (GB) 2003 | Argent du Bois; 1996 | Wiener Wald | Woodman |
| Dam Sant Elena (GB) 2003 | Argent du Bois; 1996 | Wiener Wald | Chapel of Dreams (Family: 8-c) |
