= François Mathet =

French flat race horse trainer (1908-1983)

- Born: 21 May 1908; Vesoul
- Died: 11 January 1983 (aged 74); Neuvy-le-Barrois
- Occupation: Horse trainer

François Mathet (21 May 1908 at Vesoul – 11 January 1983 at Neuvy-le-Barrois) trained racehorses, specialising in flat racing. In France he is well-remembered for being one of the best equestrian trainers in the country's history.

== Early life ==
Mathet was the son of an army lieutenant.

In 1934, Mathet (as an amateur rider) won four of the best French titles.

He was conscripted into the French Army in 1942, where he became an apprentice to Maurice d'Okhuysen at Maisons-Laffitte, still riding as an amateur jockey.

== Career ==
In 1944, after a fall, he stopped riding horses and concentrated on horse training. In 1947 he was the trainer for François Dupré's stable.

He took a long time to mend, but came back to win his first Group 1 race in 1948 with Bel Amour (horse) in the Prix d'Ispahan, going on to even better wins with Tantième and Relko. He entered both into the Prix de l'Arc de Triomphe, both in 1950 and 1951, and Relko into the Epsom Derby in 1963.

In 1964 he took over from Alec Head as the head trainer for the Aga Khan, with whom he had many wins from Blushing Groom and Top Ville. The Khan called him the "Kaluoum" or "Akiyda", the "Sphinx from Gouvieux".

Mathet taught many other trainers, including Alain de Royer-Dupré, who took over his role to train the Aga Khan's horses. He trained many famous French jockeys, including Yves Saint-Martin.

He was the most prestigious and well-known horse trainer in France, especially after his successive wins in the late 1950s and early 60s.

== Winners (Group 1 and above) ==
France

- Prix de l'Arc de Triomphe - (4) - Tantième (1950, 1951), Sassafrás (1970), Akiyda (1982)
- Prix du Jockey Club - (6) - Reliance (1965), Tapalque (1968), Sassafrás (1970), Rheffic (1971), Crystal Palace (1977), Top Ville (1979)
- Prix de Diane (the French Oaks) - (2) - Dushka (1958), La Sega (1962)
- Poule d'Essai des Poulains - (7) - Tantième (1950), Relko (1963), Zeddaan (1968), Kalamoun (1973), Blushing Groom (1977), Nishapour (1978), Melyno (1982)
- Poule d'Essai des Pouliches - (5) - Virgule (1954), Solitude (1961), La Sega (1962), Pola Bella (1968), Koblenza (1969)
- Grand Prix de Paris - (9) - Northern Light (1953), Phil Drake (1955), Vattel (1956), Reliance (1965), Danseur (1966), Rheffic (1971), Exceller (1976), Soleil Noir (1979), Le Nain Jaune (1982)
- Critérium de Saint-Cloud (8) - Telegram (1949), Bingo (1952), Pas de Deux (1955), Upstart (1957), Le Français (1960), Saraca (1968), Rheffic (1970), Simbir (1972)
- Prix de l'Abbaye de Longchamp - (8) - Texana (1957), Edellic (1958), Fortino (1962), Texanita (1963, 1964), Silver Shark (1965), Farhana (1966), Moubariz (1974)
- Prix d'Ispahan - (7) - Bel Amour (1948), Ménétrier (1949), La Sega (1962), Jour et Nuit III (1964), Silver Shark (1966), Zeddaan (1968), Lightning (1977)
- Prix Royal-Oak - (7) - Vamour (1959), Match (1961), Relko (1963), Reliance (1965), Sassafras (1970), Henri le Balafré (1975) et Exceller (1976)
- Grand Prix de Saint-Cloud - (5) - Tanerko (1957, 1958), Match (1962), Relko (1964), Exceller (1977), Shakapour (1980), Akarad (1981)
- Prix du Moulin de Longchamp - (4) - Lilya (1958), Mirna (1964), Silver Shark (1966), Pola Bella (1968)
- Prix Lupin - (5) - Tantième (1950), Tanerko (1956), Midnight Sun (1959), Kalamoun (1973), Top Ville (1979)
- Prix Jean Prat - (5) - Jour et Nuit III (1964), Silver Shark (1966), Maroun (1971), Lightning (1977), Melyno (1982)
- Prix Ganay - (4) - Tantième (1951), Tanerko (1957, 1958), Relko (1964)
- Prix Vermeille - (4) - Bella Paola (1958), Golden Girl (1963), Casaque Grise (1967), Saraca (1969)
- Prix Saint-Alary - (4) - Solitude (1961), La Sega (1962), Tonnera (1966), Saraca (1969)
- Prix Morny - (3) - Solitude (1960), Amber Rama (1969), Blushing Groom (1976)
- Prix de la Forêt - (3) - Ménétrier (1947), Tantième (1949), Mirna (1963)
- Prix du Cadran - (3) - Tello (1959), Waldmeister (1965), Danseur (1967)
- Grand Critérium - (3) - Tantième (1949), Bella Paola (1957), Blushing Groom (1976)
- Prix Robert Papin (groupe 1 since 1987) - (3) - Zeddaan (1967), Amber Rama (1969), Blushing Groom (1976)
- Prix Jacques Le Marois - (2) - Kalamoun (1973), Kenmare (1978)
- Prix de la Salamandre - (1) - Blushing Groom (1976)

United Kingdom

- Epsom Derby - (2) - Phil Drake (1955), Relko (1963)
- Epsom Oaks - (2) - Sicarelle (1956), Bella Paola (1958)
- 1000 Guineas Stakes - (1) - Bella Paola (1958)
- Coronation Cup - (4) - Tantième (1950), Dicta Drake (1962), Relko (1964), Exceller (1977)
- Champion Stakes - (2) - Bella Paola (1958), Vayrann (1980)
- King George VI and Queen Elizabeth Stakes - (1) - Match II (1962)
- Queen Elizabeth II Stakes - (1) - Tantième (1950)

United States

- Washington D.C. International - (1) - Match II (1962)

== Legacy ==
A listed race called the Prix François Mathet is run annually.
