= Khalkevi =

Irish-bred Thoroughbred racehorse

- Sire: Kahyasi
- Grandsire: Ile de Bourbon
- Dam: Khalisa
- Damsire: Persian Bold
- Sex: Stallion
- Foaled: 2 February 1999
- Country: Ireland
- Colour: Bay
- Breeder: Aga Khan IV
- Owner: Aga Khan IV
- Trainer: Alain de Royer-Dupré
- Record: 5: 4-0-0
- Earnings: £217,391

Major wins
- Prix Hocquart (2002); Grand Prix de Paris (2002)

Khalkevi (foaled 2 February 1999) is an Irish-bred, French-trained Thoroughbred racehorse and sire. In a brief racing career he won four of his five races. The colt won two minor races before being stepped up in class to win the Prix Hocquart in May 2002. He sustained his only defeat when running unplaced in the Prix du Jockey Club but came back to record his most important victory in the Grand Prix de Paris. His track career was ended by a leg injury shortly afterwards. He has had limited success as a breeding stallion.

== Background ==
Khalkevi is a bay horse with a white star bred in Ireland by his owner, Aga Khan IV. She was sent into training with Alain de Royer-Dupré in France and was ridden in all of his races by Christophe Soumillon.

He was sired by Kahyasi, who won the Epsom Derby in 1988 before becoming a good sire of stayers, jumpers and broodmares. Khalkevi's dam Khalisa was a successful racehorse won both the Prix Cléopâtre and Prix Chloé for the Aga Khan in 1996. Her grand-dam Khayra was a half-sister to Kalamoun.

== Racing career ==
=== 2002: three-year-old season ===
After winning a minor event on his racecourse debut Khalkevi contested the Prix Bay Middleton over 2100 metres at Maisons-Laffitte Racecourse on 19 April and won by one and a half lengths from the Freddy Head-trained Secret Singer. On 8 May the colt was stepped up in class and distance for the Group 3 Prix Hocquart over 2400 metres at Longchamp Racecourse and started the 3/1 second favourite behind the Aidan O'Brien entry of Black Sam Bellamy and Temple of Artemis in a seven-runner field. After being retrained towards the rear of the field he began to make progress on the wide outside in the straight. He took the lead inside the last 200 metres and won by three quarters of a length and half a length from Louveteau and Black Sam Bellamy. The runner-up was later relegated to fifth for causing interference in the last 300 metres.

In Group 1 Prix du Jockey Club over 2400 metres at Chantilly Racecourse on 2 June Khalkevi started at odds of 8.3/1. He turned into the straight in sixth place but looked outpaced thereafter and came home ninth of the fifteen runners. Three weeks later the colt was dropped back in distance and started the 11/10 favourite for the Grand Prix de Paris over 2000 metres at Longchamp. His five opponents were Shaanmer (Prix des Chênes), Rashbag (Prix de Condé), Without Connexion (third in the Prix Lupin), Foreign Accent (fourth in the Irish 2,000 Guineas) and the outsider Lost Bay. After racing in fourth place behind the early leader Foreign Accent, he was almost brought down when impeded by Rashbag just after half way. He recovered to launch a strong challenge down the centre of the straight, caught Shaanmer in the final strides and won by head. Soumillon commented "The fact that the colt almost fell and still won speaks volumes for him. The horse had an unhappy time of it in the French Derby when he got bumped, but he showed his true mettle here".

At the end of July Khalkevi sustained a serious leg injury in a training gallop. He never raced again and was retired before the end of the year.

== Stud record ==
At the end of his racing career Khalkevi was retired to become a breeding stallion. By 2018 he was standing at the Haras de la Croix Sonnet at a fee of €1,000. He sired numerous steeplechase winners but few-top-class performers.

== Pedigree ==
Pedigree of Khalkevi (IRE), bay horse 1999
Sire Kahyasi (IRE) 1985	Ile de Bourbon (USA); 1975	Nijinsky (CAN)	Northern Dancer
Sire Kahyasi (IRE) 1985	Ile de Bourbon (USA); 1975	Nijinsky (CAN)	Flaming Page
Sire Kahyasi (IRE) 1985	Ile de Bourbon (USA); 1975	Roseliere (FR)	Misti
Sire Kahyasi (IRE) 1985	Ile de Bourbon (USA); 1975	Roseliere (FR)	Peace Rose
Sire Kahyasi (IRE) 1985	Kadissya (USA); 1979	Blushing Groom (FR)	Red God (USA)
Sire Kahyasi (IRE) 1985	Kadissya (USA); 1979	Blushing Groom (FR)	Runaway Bride (FR)
Sire Kahyasi (IRE) 1985	Kadissya (USA); 1979	Kalkeem (IRE)	Sheshoon (GB)
Sire Kahyasi (IRE) 1985	Kadissya (USA); 1979	Kalkeem (IRE)	Gioia (GB)
Dam Khalisa (IRE) 1989	Darshaan; 1975	Bold Lad (IRE)	Bold Ruler (USA)
Dam Khalisa (IRE) 1989	Darshaan; 1975	Bold Lad (IRE)	Barn Pride (GB)
Dam Khalisa (IRE) 1989	Darshaan; 1975	Relkarunner (GB)	Relko
Dam Khalisa (IRE) 1989	Darshaan; 1975	Relkarunner (GB)	Running Bride
Dam Khalisa (IRE) 1989	Khaiyla; 1983	Mill Reef (USA)	Never Bend
Dam Khalisa (IRE) 1989	Khaiyla; 1983	Mill Reef (USA)	Milan Mill
Dam Khalisa (IRE) 1989	Khaiyla; 1983	Khayra (FR)	Zeddaan (GB)
Dam Khalisa (IRE) 1989	Khaiyla; 1983	Khayra (FR)	Khairunessa (GB) (Family: 9-c)
