= Karasi (horse) =

Irish-bred Thoroughbred racehorse

- Sire: Kahyasi (IRE)
- Grandsire: Ile de Bourbon (USA)
- Dam: Karamita (IRE)
- Damsire: Shantung (FR)
- Sex: Gelding
- Foaled: 20 February 1995
- Country: Ireland
- Colour: Bay
- Breeder: Aga Khan Studs
- Owner: IEH Musgrove, A Foat, EST J Morgan, PJ Morgan, GJ Morgan
- Trainer: David Hall; Eric Musgrove
- Record: 97:16-9-11
- Earnings: $3,747,283

Major wins
- Geelong Cup (2001); Yalumba Classic Hurdle (2004); Australian Hurdle (2004); SA Grand National Hurdle (2004); Nakayama Grand Jump (2005, 2006, 2007)

Honours
- Australian Racing Hall of Fame

Karasi (born 1995) is an Australian Racing Hall of Fame champion steeplechase horse bred in Ireland. The horse is best known for winning the world's richest steeplechase race, the Nakayama Grand Jump at Nakayama Racecourse, Japan for three consecutive years (2005, 2006, 2007). He was a top flat performer as a younger horse, with his best performance being a fourth in the 2001 Melbourne Cup, in which he was the highest placed Australian trained runner. He suffered a career-ending injury while in Japan preparing for his fourth Grand Jump.

Karasi was inducted to the Australian Racing Hall of Fame in 2018.

== See also ==
- Repeat winners of horse races
