= Gérald Mossé =

French jockey and horse trainer

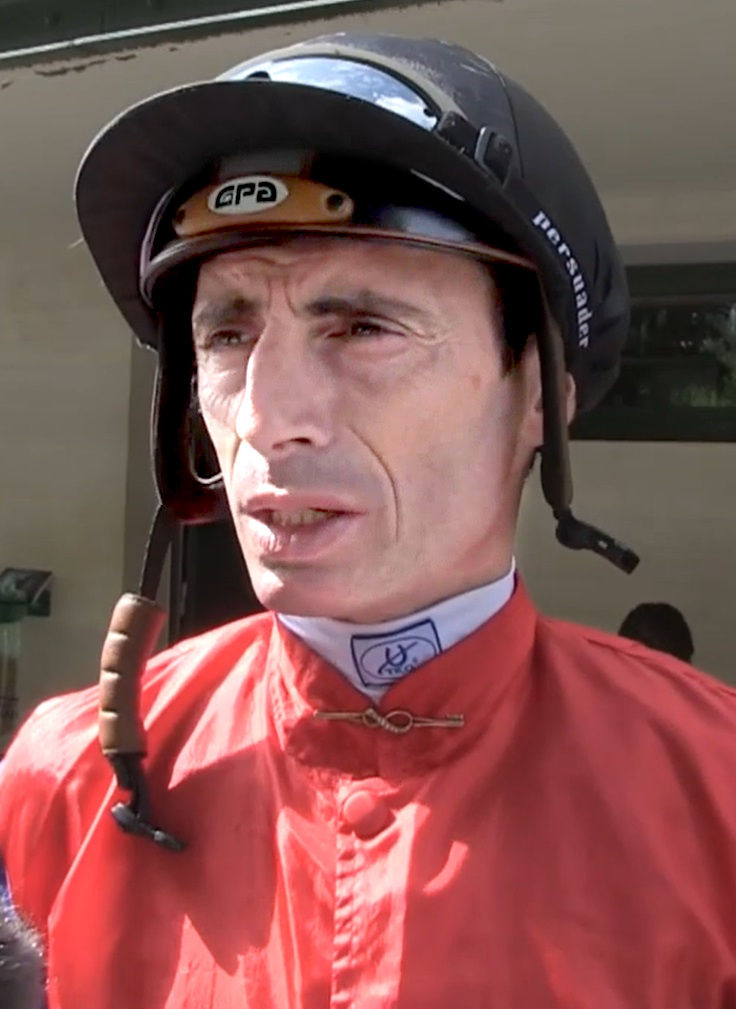
- Mossé in 2014

Personal information
- Born: 3 January 1967 (age 59) France
- Occupation: Jockey

Horse racing career
- Sport: Horse racing

Gérald Mossé (born 3 January 1967 in France) is a jockey in thoroughbred horse racing. He began riding professionally in April 1983. His success during his apprenticeship under Patrick-Louis Biancone led to an offer to ride for renowned trainer François Boutin. His stable of horses belonging to Jean-Luc Lagardère. Mossé went on to become one of his country's top jockeys, winning the 1990 Prix de l'Arc de Triomphe. In 1991, he rode Arazi to five straight wins in France then spent 1992 and part of 1993 racing in Hong Kong.

From 1993 to late 2001, Gérald Mossé was the principal rider for the horses belonging to the Aga Khan IV. He then returned to live and race in Hong Kong (where he is also known in Chinese as 巫斯義) but continues to ride in major European and international races.

On November 2, 2010, Mossé became the first French jockey to win the Melbourne Cup on the US bred horse Americain.

He added 35 victories in 2010/2011, he is one of an elite group of jockeys to have ridden more than 500 winners in Hong Kong. In 2013/14, Mossé ended the season with 24 wins for an HK career total of 603.

== Performance ==
Seasons	Total Rides	No. of Wins	No. of 2nds	No. of 3rds	No. of 4ths	Stakes won
2010/2011	279	35	35	20	30	HK$45,197,400

== Major wins ==
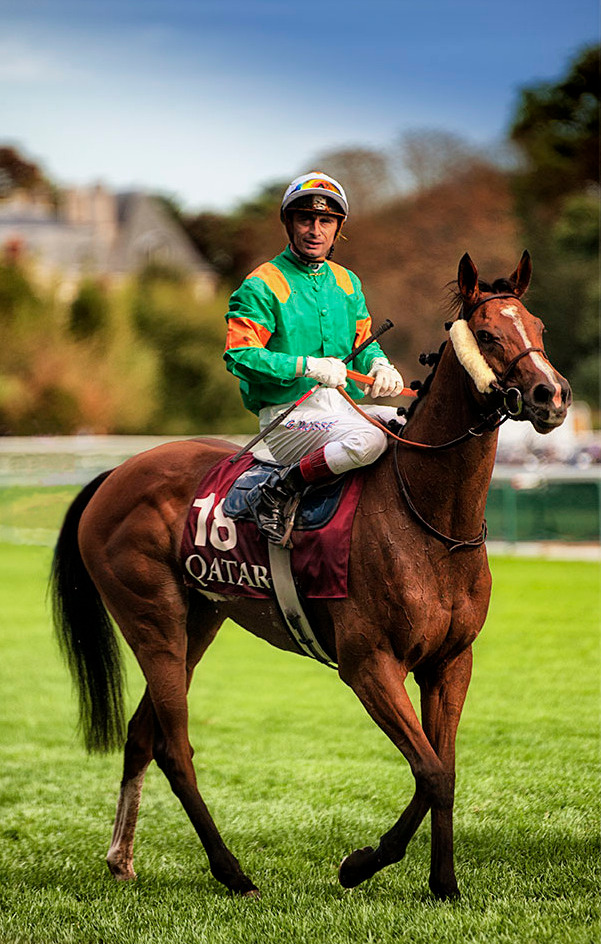
Mosse at Longchamps in 2012

France

- Prix Morny - (5) - Tersa (1988), Arazi (1991), Chargé d'Affaires (1997), Bad As I Wanna Be (2000), Reckless Abandon (2012)
- Prix de Diane - (5) - Resless Kara (1988), Shemaka (1993), Vereva (1997), Zainta (1998), Daryaba (1999)
- Critérium de Saint-Cloud - (1) - Intimiste (1989)
- Prix Maurice de Gheest - (4) - Cricket Ball (1989), Dolphin Street (1994), May Ball (2002), Garswood (2014)
- Prix de l'Arc de Triomphe - (1) - Saumarez (1990)
- Prix Jean Prat - (2) - Priolo (1990), Suances (2000)
- Prix Jean-Luc Lagardère - (2) - Arazi (1991), Siyouni (2009)
- Prix du Moulin de Longchamp - (3) - Priolo (1991), Ashkalani (1996), Sendawar (1999)
- Prix de Royallieu - (6) - Saganeca (1991), Dalara (1994), Mouramara (2000), Daryakana (2009), Maria Royal (2010), Frine (2014)
- Prix Marcel Boussac - (2) - Gold Splash (1992), Sierra Madre (1993)
- Prix Lupin - (1) - Celtic Arms (1994)
- Prix Vermeille - (2) - Sierra Madre (1994), Daryaba (1999)
- Prix du Jockey Club - (3) - Celtic Arms (1994), Ragmar (1996), Reliable Man (2011)
- Grand Prix de Paris - (2) - Valanour (1995), Behkabad (2010)
- Poule d'Essai des Poulains - (3) - Ashkalani (1996), Daylami (1997), Sendawar (1999)
- Prix Ganay - (3) - Valanour (1996), Astarabad (1998), Dark Moondancer (1999)
- Prix Royal-Oak - (2) - Ebadiyla (1997), Tiraaz (1998)
- Poule d'Essai des Pouliches - (2) - Zalaiyka (1998), Mangoustine (2022)
- Prix Saint-Alary - (2) - Zainta (1998), Sarafina (2010)
- Prix du Cadran - (3) - Tajoun (1999), Gentoo (2010), Kasbah Bliss (2011)
- Prix d'Ispahan - (2) - Sendawar (2000), Skalleti (2021)
- Prix Rothschild - (1) - Ascension (2001)
- Prix de la Forêt - (1) - Court Masterpiece (2005)
- Prix Jean Romanet - (1) - Alpine Rose (2009)
- Prix Jacques Le Marois - (1) - Immortal Verse (2011)
- Prix de l'Abbaye de Longchamp - (2) - Wizz Kid (2012), Mabs Cross (2018)

United Kingdom

- Coronation Stakes - (2) - Gold Splash (1993), Immortal Verse (2011)
- St James's Palace Stakes - (1) - Sendawar (1999)
- Nunthorpe Stakes - (1) - Nuclear Debate (2000)
- King's Stand Stakes - (1) - Nuclear Debate (2000)
- Haydock Sprint Cup - (1) - Nuclear Debate (2001)
- Middle Park Stakes - (1) - Reckless Abandon (2012)
- Sun Chariot Stakes - (1) - Siyouma (2012)

Germany

- Bayerisches Zuchtrennen - (1) - Skalleti (2021)

Italy

- Gran Premio di Milano - (1) - Dark Moondancer (1999)
- Premio Vittorio di Capua - (1) - Waikika (2016)
- Premio Presidente della Repubblica - (1) - Royal Julius (2018)
- Premio Lydia Tesio - (1) - Angel Power (2020)

Canada

- E. P. Taylor Stakes - (1) - Siyouma (2012)

Australia

- Melbourne Cup - (1) - Americain (2010)

United Arab Emirates

- Dubai Duty Free - (1) - Jim and Tonic (2001)

Hong Kong

- Hong Kong Cup - (2) - River Verdon (1991), Jim and Tonic (1999)
- Hong Kong Mile - (2) - Jim and Tonic (1998), Beauty Flash (2010)
- Hong Kong Sprint - (2) - All Thrills Too (2002), Sacred Kingdom (2007)
- Hong Kong Vase - (2) - Daryakana (2009), Red Cadeaux (2012)
- Queen Elizabeth II Cup - (1) - Jim And Tonic (1999)
- Champions Mile - (1) - Bullish Luck (2005)
- Hong Kong Stewards' Cup - (3) - Mastermind (1991), Russian Pearl (2006), Beauty Flash (2011)
- Hong Kong Gold Cup - (1) - Industrial Pioneer (2002)
- Hong Kong Champions & Chater Cup - (1) - Mr Medici (2010)
- Chairman's Sprint Prize - (1) - Sacred Kingdom (2008)
- Centenary Sprint Cup - (1) - Inspiration (2009)
- Queen's Silver Jubilee Cup - (2) - Joyful Winner (2007), Beauty Flash (2011)
- Hong Kong Derby - (3) - Super Fit (1994), Industrial Pioneer (2001), Elegant Fashion (2003)
- Hong Kong Classic Mile - (2) - Scintillation (2005), Floral Pegasus (2007)
- Hong Kong Classic Cup - (3) - Hello Pretty (2006), Floral Pegasus (2007), King Dancer (2010)
