= Grand Prix de Paris =

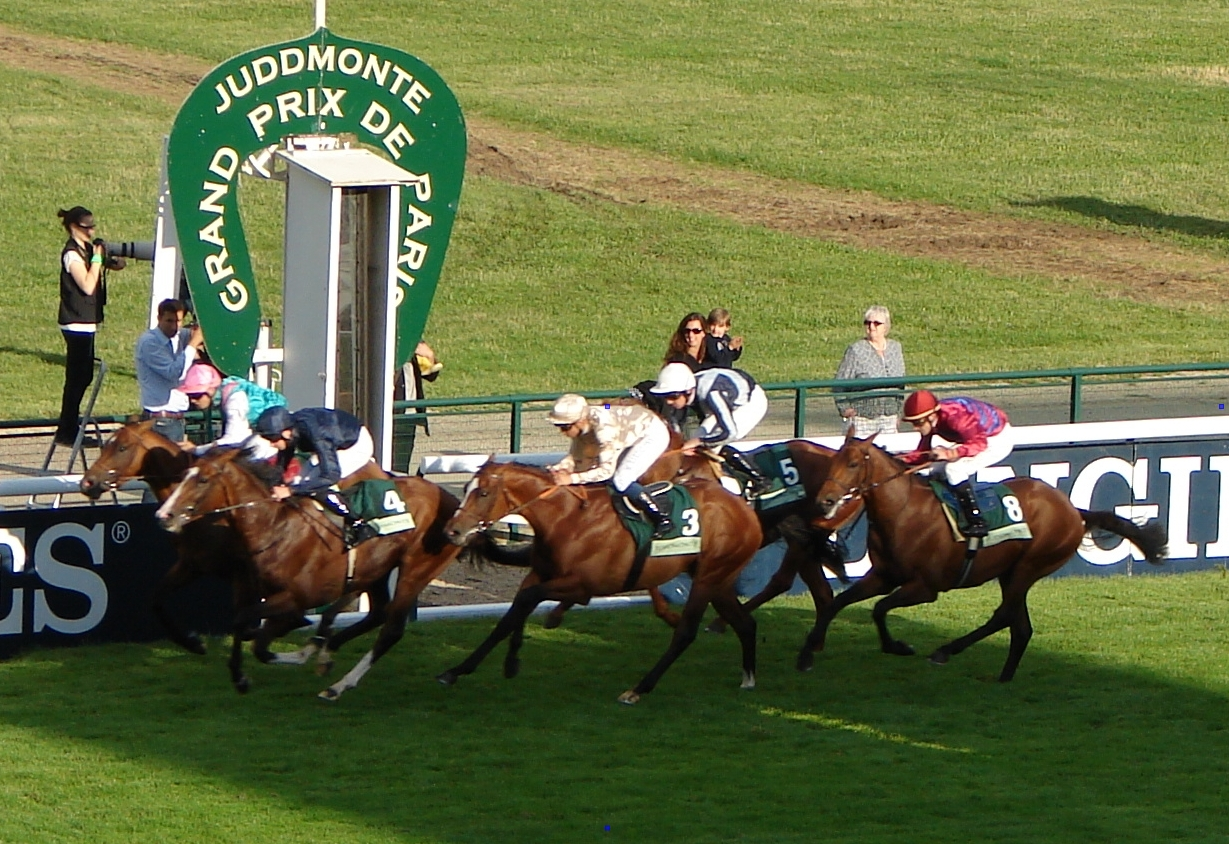
- The Grand Prix de Paris in 2012
- Class: Group 1
- Location: Longchamp Racecourse; Paris, France
- Inaugurated: 1863
- Race type: Flat / Thoroughbred
- Sponsor: Cygames
- Website: Official website

Race information
- Distance: 2,400 metres (1½ miles)
- Surface: Turf
- Track: Right-handed
- Qualification: Three-year-olds excluding geldings
- Weight: 58 kg Allowances; 1½ kg for fillies
- Purse: €600,000 (2022); 1st: €342,840

Grand Prix de Paris
2026
Maltese Cross	Ancient Egypt	Alam

Previous years
2025
Leffard	Trinity College	New Ground
2024
Sosie	Illinois	Delius
2023
Feed The Flame	Adelaide River	Soul Sister
2022
Onesto	Simca Mille	El Bodegon
2021
Hurricane Lane	Wordsworth	Alenquer

2020-2011
2020
Mogul	In Swoop	Gold Trip
2019
Japan	Slalom	Jalmoud
2018
Kew Gardens	Neufbosc	Dee Ex Bee
2017
Shakeel	Permian	Venice Beach
2016
Mont Ormel	Red Verdon	Cloth Of Stars
2015
Erupt	Ampere	Storm The Stars
2014
Gallante	Prince Gibraltar	Teletext
2013
Flintshire	Manndawi	Ocovango
2012
Imperial Monarch	Last Train	Saint Baudolino
2011
Meandre	Seville	Reliable Man

2010-2001
2010
Behkabad	Planteur	Jan Vermeer
2009
Cavalryman	Age Of Aquarius	Mastery
2008
Montmartre	Prospect Wells	Magadan
2007
Zambezi Sun	Axxos	Sagara
2006
Rail Link	Red Rocks	Sudan
2005
Scorpion	Desideratum	Orion Star
2004
Bago	Cacique	Alnitak
2003
Vespone	Magistretti	Look Honey
2002
Khalkevi	Shaanmer	Without Connexion
2001
Chichicastenango	Mizzen Mast	Bonnard

2000-1991
2000
Beat Hollow	Premier Pas	Rhenium
1999
Slickly	Indian Danehill	Sardaukar
1998
Limpid	Almutawakel	Croco Rouge
1997
Peintre Celebre	Ithaki	Shaka
1996
Grape Tree Road	Glory Of Dancer	Android
1995
Valanour	Singspiel	Diamond Mix
1994
Millkom	Solid Illusion	Celtic Arms
1993
Fort Wood	Bigstone	Siam
1992
Homme De Loi	Kitwood	Guislaine
1991
Subotica	Sillery	Kotashaan

1990-1988
1990
Saumarez	Priolo	Tirol
1989
Dancehall	Norberto	Creator
1988
Fijar Tango	Pasakos	Welkin

The Grand Prix de Paris (branded as the Cygames Grand Prix de Paris for sponsorship reasons) is a Group 1 flat horse race in France open to three-year-old thoroughbred colts and fillies. It is run at Longchamp over a distance of 2,400 metres (about 1½ miles), and it is scheduled to take place each year in July.

== History ==
The event was created by the Société d'Encouragement, a former governing body of horse racing in France. It originally served as a showpiece for the best home-bred three-year-olds to compete against international opponents over 3,000 metres. It was established in 1863, and the inaugural running was won by a British colt called The Ranger. The initial prize of 100,000 francs was raised by the Duc de Morny, who obtained half of the money from the Paris Municipal Council and an equal share of the remainder from each of the five main regional railway companies. For a period it was France's richest and most prestigious race.

The Grand Prix de Paris was abandoned because of the Franco-Prussian War in 1871. It was cancelled throughout World War I, with no running from 1915 to 1918. It continued to be the country's leading flat race until the introduction of the Prix de l'Arc de Triomphe in 1920. The event was temporarily switched to Le Tremblay in 1943 and 1944. It was extended to 3,100 metres in 1964.

The present system of race grading was introduced in 1971, and the Grand Prix de Paris was classed at the highest level, Group 1. It reverted to 3,000 metres in 1978, and it was shortened to 2,000 metres in 1987. It was sponsored by Louis Vuitton from 1988 to 1992, and the sponsorship of Juddmonte Farms began in 2001.

The distance of the Grand Prix de Paris was increased to 2,400 metres in 2005. It is normally held at an evening meeting on July 14, the French national holiday of Bastille Day. Due to the COVID-19 pandemic, the 2020 running was postponed to 13 September, replacing the Prix Niel, traditionally run at that time.

== Records ==
Leading jockey (6 wins):

- Tom Lane – Stuart (1888), Fitz Roya (1890), Clamart (1891), Rueil (1892), Ragotsky (1893), Perth (1899)

Leading trainer (14 wins):

- André Fabre – Dancehall (1989), Subotica (1991), Homme de Loi (1992), Fort Wood (1993), Grape Tree Road (1996), Peintre Celebre (1997), Limpid (1998), Slickly (1999), Rail Link (2006), Cavalryman (2009), Meandre (2011), Flintshire (2013), Gallante (2014), Sosie (2024)

Leading owner (7 wins):

- Edmond Blanc – Nubienne (1879), Clamart (1891), Rueil (1892), Andree (1895), Arreau (1896), Quo Vadis (1903), Ajax (1904)
- Aga Khan IV - Charlottesville (1960), Sumayr (1985), Valanour (1995), Khalkevi (2002), Montmartre (2008), Behkabad (2010), Shakeel (2017)

== Winners since 1957 ==
Year	Winner	Jockey	Trainer	Owner	Time
1957	Altipan	Roger Poincelet	Etienne Pollet	Gérard Delloye	3:13.40
1958	San Roman	Roger Poincelet	Daniel Lescalle	Victor Lyon	3:12.96
1959	Birum	Léon Flavien	Max Bonaventure	André Belinguier	3:13.46
1960	Charlottesville	George Moore	Alec Head	Aga Khan IV	3:19.80
1961	Balto	Maxime Garcia	Max Bonaventure	André Rueff	3:10.14
1962	Armistice	Jean Deforge	John Cunnington Jr.	Mathieu Goudchaux	3:10.10
1963	Sanctus	Roger Poincelet	Etienne Pollet	Jean Ternynck	3:12.70
1964	White Label	Louis Heurteur	Geoffroy Watson	Guy de Rothschild	3:23.50
1965	Reliance	Yves Saint-Martin	François Mathet	François Dupré	3:23.76
1966	Danseur	Yves Saint-Martin	François Mathet	François Dupré	3:24.48
1967	Phaeton	Léon Flavien	Max Bonaventure	Mrs Jean Stern	3:22.60
1968	Dhaudevi	Freddy Head	Robert Corme	Mrs Georges Courtois	3:18.60
1969	Chaparral	Freddy Head	William Head	Mrs Guy Weisweiller	3:19.80
1970	Roll of Honour	Lester Piggott	Richard Carver Jr.	Earl Scheib	3:23.90
1971	Rheffic	Bill Pyers	François Mathet	Mrs François Dupré	3:27.50
1972	Pleben	Marcel Depalmas	Geoffroy Watson	Baron de Redé	3:23.60
1973	Tennyson	Alfred Gibert	Peter Head	Walter Burmann	3:17.70
1974	Sagaro	Lester Piggott	François Boutin	Gerry Oldham	3:27.60
1975	Matahawk	Robert Jallu	Henri van de Poele	Mrs Edouard Stern	3:17.90
1976	Exceller	Yves Saint-Martin	François Mathet	Nelson Bunker Hunt	3:20.50
1977	Funny Hobby	Philippe Paquet	Jacques de Chevigny	Mrs T. J. Caralli	3:21.70
1978	Galiani	Alain Lequeux	Maurice Zilber	André Ben Lassin	3:18.20
1979	Soleil Noir	Henri Samani	François Mathet	Guy de Rothschild	3:21.70
1980	Valiant Heart	Alfred Gibert	Bernard Sécly	André Michel	3:25.10
1981	Glint of Gold	John Matthias	Ian Balding	Paul Mellon	3:25.50
1982	Le Nain Jaune	Henri Samani	François Mathet	Guy de Rothschild	3:18.40
1983	Yawa	Philip Waldron	Geoff Lewis	Elisha Holding	3:24.00
1984	At Talaq	Tony Murray	Harry Thomson Jones	Hamdan Al Maktoum	3:14.00
1985	Sumayr	Yves Saint-Martin	Alain de Royer-Dupré	Aga Khan IV	3:20.00
1986	Swink	Walter Swinburn	Jonathan Pease	Nelson Bunker Hunt	3:19.30
1987	Risk Me	Steve Cauthen	Paul Kelleway	Lewis Norris	2:08.30
1988	Fijar Tango	Tony Cruz	Georges Mikhalidès	Mahmoud Fustok	2:05.80
1989	Dancehall	Cash Asmussen	André Fabre	Tomohiro Wada	2:03.60
1990	Saumarez	Steve Cauthen	Nicolas Clément	Bruce McNall	2:07.50
1991	Subotica	Thierry Jarnet	André Fabre	Olivier Lecerf	2:05.20
1992	Homme de Loi	Thierry Jarnet	André Fabre	Paul de Moussac	2:03.90
1993	Fort Wood	Sylvain Guillot	André Fabre	Sheikh Mohammed	2:01.60
1994	Millkom	Jean-René Dubosc	Jean-Claude Rouget	Jean-Claude Gour	2:04.40
1995	Valanour	Gérald Mossé	Alain de Royer-Dupré	Aga Khan IV	2:02.20
1996	Grape Tree Road	Thierry Jarnet	André Fabre	Michael Tabor	2:02.30
1997	Peintre Celebre	Olivier Peslier	André Fabre	Daniel Wildenstein	2:08.40
1998	Limpid	Olivier Peslier	André Fabre	Sheikh Mohammed	2:03.20
1999	Slickly	Thierry Jarnet	André Fabre	Jean-Luc Lagardère	2:03.90
2000	Beat Hollow	Richard Quinn	Henry Cecil	Khalid Abdullah	2:03.70
2001	Chichicastenango	Alain Junk	Philippe Demercastel	Béatrice Brunet	2:01.00
2002	Khalkevi	Christophe Soumillon	Alain de Royer-Dupré	Aga Khan IV	2:02.40
2003	Vespone	Christophe Lemaire	Nicolas Clément	Ecurie Mister Ess A S	2:01.10
2004	Bago	Thierry Gillet	Jonathan Pease	Niarchos Family	2:05.60
2005	Scorpion	Kieren Fallon	Aidan O'Brien	Magnier / Tabor	2:24.30
2006	Rail Link	Christophe Soumillon	André Fabre	Khalid Abdullah	2:26.40
2007	Zambezi Sun	Stéphane Pasquier	Pascal Bary	Khalid Abdullah	2:31.60
2008	Montmartre	Christophe Soumillon	Alain de Royer-Dupré	Aga Khan IV	2:26.20
2009	Cavalryman	Maxime Guyon	André Fabre	Sheikh Mohammed	2:27.60
2010	Behkabad	Gérald Mossé	Jean-Claude Rouget	Aga Khan IV	2:33.30
2011	Meandre	Maxime Guyon	André Fabre	Rothschild Family	2:26.63
2012	Imperial Monarch	Joseph O'Brien	Aidan O'Brien	Sue Magnier	2:35.47
2013	Flintshire	Maxime Guyon	André Fabre	Khalid Abdullah	2:28.57
2014	Gallante	Pierre-Charles Boudot	André Fabre	Magnier, Smith & Tabor	2:41.76
2015	Erupt	Stéphane Pasquier	Francis-Henri Graffard	Niarchos Family	2:31.07
2016	Mont Ormel^{[a]}^{[b]}	Cristian Demuro	Pia Brandt	Gerard Augustin-Normand	2:29.56
2017	Shakeel^{[a]}	Christophe Soumillon	Alain de Royer-Dupré	Aga Khan IV	2:30.42
2018	Kew Gardens	Ryan Moore	Aidan O'Brien	Magnier, Smith & Tabor	2:28.62
2019	Japan	Ryan Moore	Aidan O'Brien	Derrick Smith, Magnier & Tabor	2:27.07
2020	Mogul^{[c]}	Pierre-Charles Boudot	Aidan O'Brien	Derrick Smith, Magnier & Tabor	2:24.76
2021	Hurricane Lane	William Buick	Charlie Appleby	Godolphin	2:33.59
2022	Onesto	Stéphane Pasquier	Fabrice Chappet	Augustin-Normand, Dubois et al.	2:27.76
2023	Feed The Flame	Cristian Demuro	Pascal Bary	Ecurie Jean-Louis Bouchard	2:26.71
2024	Sosie	Maxime Guyon	André Fabre	Wertheimer et Frère	2:31.02
2025	Leffard	Cristian Demuro	Jean-Claude Rouget	Augustin-Normand and Caro	2:26.45
2026	Maltese Cross	Tom Marquand	William Haggas	George Waud	2:24.79

^{a} The 2016 and 2017 races took place at Saint-Cloud while Longchamp was closed for redevelopment.
^{b} The 2016 winner Mont Ormel was later exported to Hong Kong and renamed Helene Charisma.
^{c} The 2020 race was run in September owing to the COVID-19 pandemic.

== Earlier winners ==
- 1863: The Ranger
- 1864: Vermouth
- 1865: Gladiateur
- 1866: Ceylon
- 1867: Fervacques *
- 1868: The Earl
- 1869: Glaneur
- 1870: Sornette
- 1871: no race
- 1872: Cremorne
- 1873: Boiard
- 1874: Trent
- 1875: Salvator
- 1876: Kisber
- 1877: Saint Christophe
- 1878: Thurio
- 1879: Nubienne
- 1880: Robert the Devil
- 1881: Foxhall
- 1882: Bruce
- 1883: Frontin
- 1884: Little Duck
- 1885: Paradox
- 1886: Minting
- 1887: Tenebreuse
- 1888: Stuart
- 1889: Vasistas
- 1890: Fitz Roya
- 1891: Clamart
- 1892: Rueil
- 1893: Ragotsky
- 1894: Dolma Baghtche
- 1895: Andree
- 1896: Arreau
- 1897: Doge
- 1898: Le Roi Soleil
- 1899: Perth
- 1900: Semendria
- 1901: Cheri
- 1902: Kizil Kourgan
- 1903: Quo Vadis
- 1904: Ajax
- 1905: Finasseur
- 1906: Spearmint
- 1907: Sans Souci
- 1908: Northeast
- 1909: Verdun
- 1910: Nuage
- 1911: As d'Atout
- 1912: Houli
- 1913: Bruleur
- 1914: Sardanapale
- 1915–16: no race
- 1917: Brumelli
- 1918: Montmartin
- 1919: Galloper Light
- 1920: Comrade
- 1921: Lemonora
- 1922: Kefalin
- 1923: Filibert de Savoie
- 1924: Transvaal
- 1925: Reine Lumiere
- 1926: Take My Tip
- 1927: Fiterari
- 1928: Cri de Guerre
- 1929: Hotweed
- 1930: Commanderie
- 1931: Barneveldt
- 1932: Strip the Willow
- 1933: Cappiello
- 1934: Admiral Drake
- 1935: Crudité
- 1936: Mieuxce
- 1937: Clairvoyant
- 1938: Nearco
- 1939: Pharis
- 1940: Maurepas
- 1941: Le Pacha
- 1942: Magister
- 1943: Pensbury
- 1944: Deux Pour Cent
- 1945: Caracalla
- 1946: Souverain
- 1947: Avenger
- 1948: My Love
- 1949: Bagheera
- 1950: Vieux Manoir
- 1951: Sicambre
- 1952: Orfeo
- 1953: Northern Light
- 1954: Popof
- 1955: Phil Drake
- 1956: Vattel

* The 1867 race finished as a dead-heat between Fervacques and Patricien, but it was decided by a run-off.

== See also ==
- List of French flat horse races
