= Natroun =

French-bred Thoroughbred racehorse (1984–2005)

- Sire: Akarad
- Grandsire: Labus
- Dam: Niece Divine
- Damsire: Great Nephew
- Sex: Stallion
- Foaled: 20 April 1984
- Country: France
- Colour: Brown
- Breeder: Aga Khan IV
- Owner: Aga Khan IV
- Trainer: Alain de Royer-Dupré
- Record: 5: 3-0-0

Major wins
- Prix du Jockey-Club (1987)

Awards
- Timeform rating 128 (1987)

Natroun (20 April 1984 – 2005) was a French Thoroughbred racehorse and sire. Owned and bred by the Aga Khan IV and trained by Alain de Royer-Dupré he won three of five races as a three-year-old in 1987. Unraced as a two-year-old he won two minor races in the spring before recording his most important success in the Prix du Jockey Club. In his two remaining races he ran well when fourth under top weight in the Prix Niel and finished unplaced in the Prix de l'Arc de Triomphe. He was retired from racing at the end of the year to stand as a breeding stallion but had very little success as a sire of winners in either Europe or Japan.

== Background ==
Natroun was a brown horse with a small white star bred in France by his owner the Aga Khan. He was sired by Akarad, a colt who was acquired by the Aga Khan at the dispersal sale of Marcel Boussac's bloodstock in 1980. Akarad won the Grand Prix de Saint-Cloud and the Prix Niel in 1981, Akarad was a very good racehorse and stallion. Besides Natroun he sired the Group One winners Restless Kara (Prix de Diane), Roakarad (Gran Pemio del Jockey Club), Tel Quel (Champion Stakes), Queen Maud(Prix Vermielle). Natroun's dam Niece Divine won three races and was a half-sister of Vayrann, Valiyar (winner of the Queen Anne Stakes), Veana (dam of the Prix de Diane winner Vereva) and Yashgan (Oak Tree Invitational). Niece Divine was acquired by the Aga Khan when he purchased the Dupré bloodstock as a "job lot" of 82 horses in 1977.

The colt was sent into training with Alain de Royer-Dupré and was ridden in most of his races by Yves Saint-Martin.

== Racing career ==
=== 1987: three-year-old season ===
Natroun made a successful racecourse debut when winning a maiden race over 2400 metres at Longchamp Racecourse on 7 May. Two weeks later he contested the Prix de l'Avre over the same course and distance and won by five lengths from Bilal. Following the race, the colt's owner paid a supplementary entry fee of approximately £15,200 to enter the horse in the Prix du Jockey-Club, reportedly at the urging of Saint-Martin.

On 7 June, Natroun contested the 150th running of the Prix du Jockey-Club over 2400 metres at Chantilly Racecourse. In France, horses in the same ownership or stable are coupled for betting purposes. The Vincent O'Brien pair Ancient Times and Seattle Dancer started 2/1 favourite ahead of the Daniel Wildenstein entry comprising Miracle Horse and Lascaux, whilst Natroun, coupled with his stablemate Dastaan started at odds of 4.1/1. The other runners included Trempolino, Saint Andrews, Le Glorieux and Boyatino. The seventeen runner field was not considered a strong one, with many of the best French-trained colts including Persifleur (Prix Greffulhe), Sadjiyd (Prix Noailles, Prix Hocquart) and Groom Dancer (Prix Lupin) being sent to England to contest The Derby. Saint-Martin retrained Natroun towards the rear of the field before moving to the outside to make his challenge in the straight. He moved into third 200 metres from the finish and overtook the leader Trempolino in the final strides to win by a head. The British-trained Naheez finished third, ahead of his fellow outsiders Mansonnien and The Scout.

After a break of over three months, Natroun returned for the Prix Niel on 13 September. Starting the 6/10 favourite against five opponents he led from the start in a slowly run race before dead-heating for fourth behind Trempolino, Video Rock and Saint Andrews. He was beaten less than two lengths by the winner and was conceding seven pounds to the horses who finished in front of him. In the Prix de l'Arc de Triomphe on 4 October Natroun, coupled in the betting with his stablemates Sharaniya and Tabayaan, started the 5.2/1 third favourite behind Reference Point and Triptych. He looked impressive before the race but after racing close behind the leaders he faded to finish ninth of eleven runners behind Trempolino. Timeform suggested that the colt may have been unsuited by the firm ground.

== Assessment ==
In the International Classification for 1987, Natroun was rated on 125, placing him ten pounds behind the top-rated Reference Point and making him the second-best French colt of his generation behind Trempolino. The independent Timeform organisation awarded him a rating of 128, eleven pounds inferior to Reference Point.

== Stud record ==
After his win in the Prix du Jockey Club a major share in Natroun was sold to the National Stud and he began his career as a breeding stallion in 1988 at a fee of £7,000 before being exported to Japan a year later,

Natroun made very little impact as a Flat racing stallion in his season at stud in Europe but did sire the top-class National Hunt performer Squire Silk, whose win included the Tote Gold Trophy and the Maghull Novices' Chase. He was not popular with Japanese breeders, and suffered from low fertility, siring only 74 registered foals in thirteen years at stud.

== Pedigree ==
Pedigree of Natroun (FR), brown stallion, 1984
Sire Akarad (FR) 1978	Labus (FR); 1971	Busted	Crepello
Sire Akarad (FR) 1978	Labus (FR); 1971	Busted	Sans le Sou
Sire Akarad (FR) 1978	Labus (FR); 1971	Cordovilla	Pharis
Sire Akarad (FR) 1978	Labus (FR); 1971	Cordovilla	Cordova
Sire Akarad (FR) 1978	LIcata (FR); 1969	Abdos	Arbar
Sire Akarad (FR) 1978	LIcata (FR); 1969	Abdos	Pretty Lady
Sire Akarad (FR) 1978	LIcata (FR); 1969	Gaia	Shantung
Sire Akarad (FR) 1978	LIcata (FR); 1969	Gaia	Gloriana
Dam Niece Divine (IRE) 1976	Great Nephew (GB); 1963	Honeyway	Fairway
Dam Niece Divine (IRE) 1976	Great Nephew (GB); 1963	Honeyway	Honey Buzzard
Dam Niece Divine (IRE) 1976	Great Nephew (GB); 1963	Sybil's Niece	Admiral's Walk
Dam Niece Divine (IRE) 1976	Great Nephew (GB); 1963	Sybil's Niece	Sybil's Sister
Dam Niece Divine (IRE) 1976	Val Divine (FR); 1971	Val de Loir	Vieux Manoir
Dam Niece Divine (IRE) 1976	Val Divine (FR); 1971	Val de Loir	Vali
Dam Niece Divine (IRE) 1976	Val Divine (FR); 1971	Pola Bella	Darius
Dam Niece Divine (IRE) 1976	Val Divine (FR); 1971	Pola Bella	Bella Paola (Family 4-n)
