= Jean-Claude Rouget =

French jockey

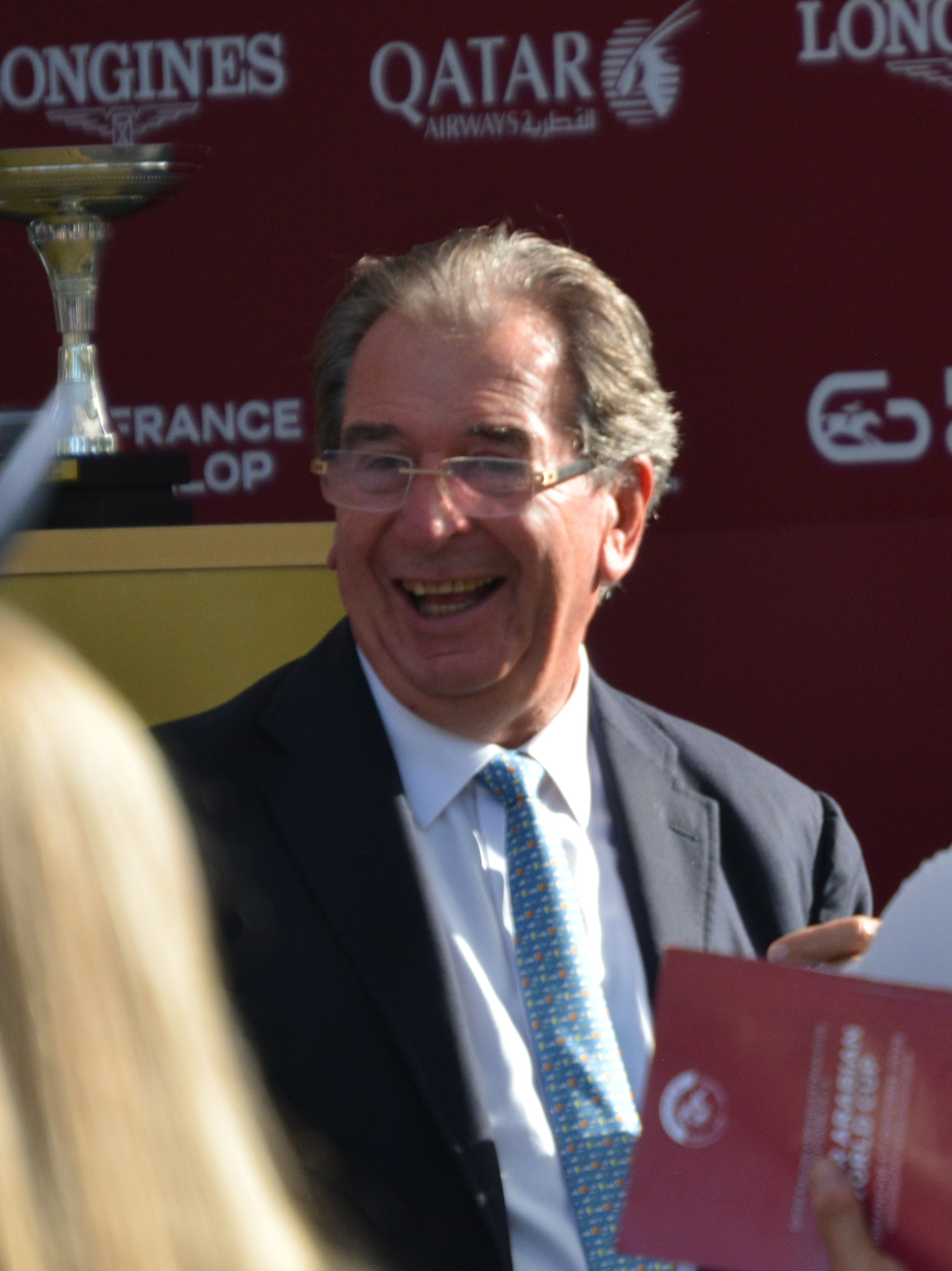

Personal information
- Born: 1953 (age 72–73) Normandy, France
- Occupation: Trainer

Horse racing career
- Sport: Horse racing
- Career wins: not found

Major racing wins
- As a trainer: Eclipse Stakes (2022); Grand Prix de Paris (1994, 2010, 2025); Prix Jean Prat (1994, 2016,2024); American Derby (1995); Man o' War Stakes (1995); Critérium de Saint-Cloud (1996, 2012, 2013); Prix Hocquart (1997, 2001, 2003, 2004, 2006); Prix Greffulhe (2000, 2001); Prix de Royallieu (2001); Prix Saint-Alary (2004, 2006, 2007, 2009, 2016, 2020); Prix Noailles (2005, 2009); Prix Guillaume d'Ornano (2005, 2007, 2016, 2022); Champion Stakes (2007, 2016); Coronation Stakes (2015, 2016); Prix Vicomtesse Vigier (2007); Prix Daniel Wildenstein (2009); Prix de l'Opéra (2010); Prix de Diane (2009, 2012, 2014, 2016); Poule d'Essai des Pouliches (2009, 2014, 2015, 2016); Prix d'Ispahan (2009, 2017); Prix du Jockey Club (2009, 2016, 2017, 2019, 2022, 2023); Prix Vermeille (2009); Prix Rothschild (2016); Prix de l'Arc de Triomphe (2020, 2023)

Significant horses
- Elusive Wave, Stacelita, Almanzor, Ace Impact

Jean-Claude Rouget (born 1953 in Normandy) is a French Thoroughbred horse trainer and former jockey. Rouget is one of the most successful trainers in French racing history, and the "most numerically successful trainer in European racing history", having passed the 7,000-winner mark in August 2022.
