= Ile de Bourbon =

American-bred, British-trained Thoroughbred racehorse

- Sire: Nijinsky
- Grandsire: Northern Dancer
- Dam: Roseliere
- Damsire: Misti
- Sex: Stallion
- Foaled: 1975
- Country: United Kingdom
- Colour: Bay
- Breeder: Jane Engelhard
- Owner: David McCall
- Trainer: Fulke Johnson Houghton
- Record: 12:5-3-0

Major wins
- King Edward VII Stakes (1978); King George VI and Queen Elizabeth Stakes (1978); Geoffrey Freer Stakes (1978); Coronation Cup (1979)

Honours
- 1978 Timeform Top-rated European three-year-old (133); 1979 Timeform Top-rated European older horse (133)
- Last updated on 27 April 2022

Ile de Bourbon (1975–1997) was an American-bred, British-trained Thoroughbred racehorse and sire. In a career which lasted from 1977 until October 1979 he ran twelve times and won five races. His most important success came in July 1978 when he won the King George VI and Queen Elizabeth Stakes at Ascot. He was retired to stud in 1979 and sired the Derby winner Kahyasi.

== Background ==
Ile de Bourbon was a dark-coated bay horse standing 16.1 hands high, bred in the United States by Jane Engelhard, the wife of Charles W. Engelhard, Jr. He was sired by the Triple Crown winner Nijinsky out of the French mare Roseliere, whose wins included the Prix de Diane and the Prix Vermeille. In addition to Ile de Bourbon, Roseliere also produced the leading British filly Rose Bowl and was a full sister of the leading National Hunt stallion Roselier. When the British trainer Fulke Johnson Houghton first saw the yearling in Kentucky, he described him as "all ribs, looking a right bugger", but bought him anyway and brought him back to train at his stable at Blewbury in Wiltshire. Ile de Bourbon ran in the colours of David McCall and was owned by McCall in partnership with Sir Philip Oppenheimer, Fulke Johnson Houghton and the trainer's mother, Helen Johnson Houghton.

== Racing career ==
=== 1977: two-year-old season ===
In 1977, Ile de Bourbon finished fourth over seven furlongs on his racecourse debut and was then moved up sharply in class for the Group One William Hill Futurity at Doncaster in which he finished ninth behind Dactylographer.

=== 1978: three-year-old season ===
Ile de Bourbon began his three-year-old season by finishing second to the soon-to-be Epsom Derby winner Shirley Heights in the Listed Heathorn Stakes at Newmarket. He then finished second in the Predominate Stakes, a trial race for The Derby. Ile de Bourbon missed The Derby but ran two weeks later at Royal Ascot, when he recorded his first important win in the Group Two King Edward VII Stakes. He returned to Ascot in July for Britain's most prestigious all-aged race, the King George VI & Queen Elizabeth Stakes. He started at odds of 12/1 in a field of fourteen runners. Ridden by John Reid, he won by one and a half lengths from the Prix du Jockey Club winner Acamas and the Epsom Derby runner-up Hawaiian Sound. Acamas was subsequently disqualified after failing a drug test. In August, Ile de Bourbon won the Geoffrey Freer Stakes at Newbury. Ile de Bourbon was made favourite for the St Leger at Doncaster but finished sixth of the fourteen runners behind Julio Mariner.

=== 1979: four-year-old season ===
Ile de Bourbon began his four-year-old season by winning the Clive Graham Stakes. He was then sent to Epsom and won the Coronation Cup by ten lengths from a field which included the leading French colts Frere Basile and Gay Mecene. He missed a clash with Troy in the King George VI and Queen Elizabeth Stakes, before returning in the September Stakes at Kempton. In a major upset, he was defeated by the three-year-old Cracaval. On his final racecourse appearance, Ile de Bourbon finished unplaced behind Three Troikas in the Prix de l'Arc de Triomphe.

== Assessment ==
John Reid regarded Ile de Bourbon as one of the best horses he rode.

Timeform rated Ile de Bourbon at 133 in both 1978 and 1979. He was the highest-rated European three-year-old of 1978 and the highest-rated older horse of 1979.

== Stud record ==
Ile de Bourbon stood as a stallion in Europe before being exported to Japan in 1987. His most successful progeny included Kahyasi, Ile de Chypre, Petite Ile and Ile de Nisky (Cumberland Lodge Stakes). Ile de Bourbon died in 1997.

== Pedigree ==
Ile de Bourbon's pedigree is as follows:

Pedigree of Ile de Bourbon (USA), bay stallion, 1975
| Sire Nijinsky (CAN) 1967 | Northern Dancer; 1961 | Nearctic | Nearco |
| Sire Nijinsky (CAN) 1967 | Northern Dancer; 1961 | Nearctic | Lady Angela |
| Sire Nijinsky (CAN) 1967 | Northern Dancer; 1961 | Natalma | Native Dancer |
| Sire Nijinsky (CAN) 1967 | Northern Dancer; 1961 | Natalma | Almahmoud |
| Sire Nijinsky (CAN) 1967 | Flaming Page; 1959 | Bull Page | Bull Lea |
| Sire Nijinsky (CAN) 1967 | Flaming Page; 1959 | Bull Page | Our Page |
| Sire Nijinsky (CAN) 1967 | Flaming Page; 1959 | Flaring Top | Menow |
| Sire Nijinsky (CAN) 1967 | Flaming Page; 1959 | Flaring Top | Flaming Top |
| Dam Roseliere (FR) 1965 | Misti; 1958 | Medium | Meridien |
| Dam Roseliere (FR) 1965 | Misti; 1958 | Medium | Melodie |
| Dam Roseliere (FR) 1965 | Misti; 1958 | Mist | Tornado |
| Dam Roseliere (FR) 1965 | Misti; 1958 | Mist | La Touche |
| Dam Roseliere (FR) 1965 | Peace Rose; 1959 | Fastnet Rock | Ocean Swell |
| Dam Roseliere (FR) 1965 | Peace Rose; 1959 | Fastnet Rock | Stone of Fortune |
| Dam Roseliere (FR) 1965 | Peace Rose; 1959 | La Paix | Seven Seas |
| Dam Roseliere (FR) 1965 | Peace Rose; 1959 | La Paix | Anne de Bretagne (Family:4-i) |
