= Alain de Royer-Dupré =

French racehorse trainer (born 1944)

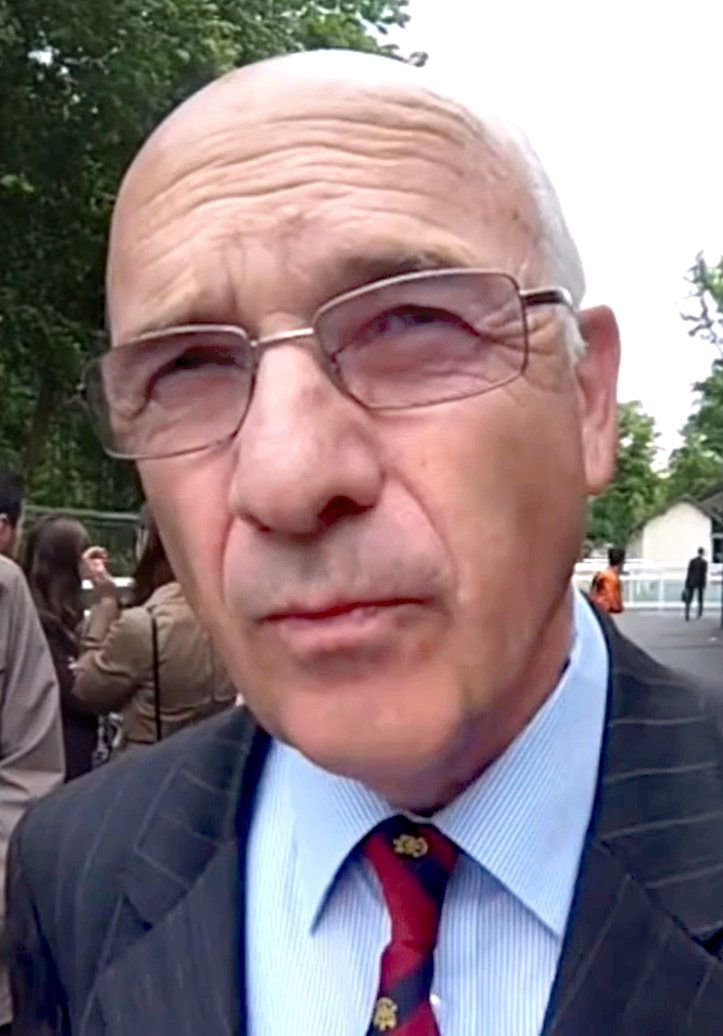
Alain de Royer-Dupré in 2013

Alain de Royer-Dupré (born 24 September 1944) is a retired French thoroughbred racehorse trainer.

== Early life ==
He grew up at the Haras de Saint Lô, a national stud farm in Normandy of which his father was Assistant Director and later Director, responsible for government-owned stallions (thoroughbreds, half-breds, trotters and in particular the Selle Français saddle horse) based at farms in the local region.

== Training career ==
He worked at the Haras du Mesnil, Mme Jean Couturié's stud in Normandy, for eight years and started his career there training three of his own jumpers. On 23 April 1972 he trained his first winner, El Morucho, in a steeplechase at Nantes. After setting up as a public trainer at Montfort Le Rotrou in Normandy, training second-string horses for the Aga Khan and Baron Guy de Rothschild with considerable success in the French provinces, he moved to Aiglemont, Chantilly to take over as the Aga Khan's principal trainer in 1981 after the death of François Mathet. He has trained many notable winners around the world for the Aga Khan.

== Achievements ==
Alain de Royer-Dupré has won Group/Grade 1 races in eight countries on three continents. He has won all of the French classics at least twice. Among his best horses in recent years are Dalakhani (Prix du Jockey Club and Prix de l'Arc de Triomphe) and Zarkava, unbeaten winner of the Prix de l'Arc de Triomphe and four other Group 1 races, thanks to whom he became French Champion Trainer for the first time in 2008, winning 50 races and $15 million in prize money.

Other top Royer-Dupré-trained horses include the French Derby winner Darsi and Prix de l'Arc de Triomphe second Pride, winner of the Champion Stakes and the Hong Kong Cup. In 2010 he was responsible for the first French-trained Melbourne Cup winner Americain.

== Major wins ==
France

- Critérium International – (1) – Dalakhani (2002)
- Critérium de Saint-Cloud – (2) – Darshaan (1983), Mouktar (1984)
- Grand Prix de Paris – (5) – Sumayr (1985), Valanour (1995), Khalkevi (2002), Montmartre (2008), Shakeel (2017)
- Grand Prix de Saint-Cloud – (2) – Pride (2006), Sarafina (2011)
- Poule d'Essai des Poulains – (3) – Ashkalani (1996), Daylami (1997), Sendawar (1999)
- Poule d'Essai des Pouliches – (4) – Masarika (1984), Zalaiyka (1998), Darjina (2007), Zarkava (2008)
- Prix de l'Arc de Triomphe – (2) – Dalakhani (2003), Zarkava (2008)
- Prix d'Astarté – (2) – Mandesha (2006), Darjina (2007)
- Prix du Cadran – (2) – Tajoun (1999), Vazirabad (2017)
- Prix de Diane – (6) – Shemaka (1993), Vereva (1997), Zainta (1998), Daryaba (1999), Zarkava (2008), Sarafina (2010)
- Prix de la Forêt – (1) – Varenar (2009)
- Prix Ganay – (5) – Kartajana (1991), Valanour (1996), Astarabad (1998), Dark Moondancer (1999), Dariyan (2016)
- Prix d'Ispahan – (2) – Sendawar (2000), Sageburg (2008)
- Prix Jean-Luc Lagardère – (2) – Danishkada (1986), Siyouni (2009)
- Prix Jean Romanet – (2) – Pride (2005), Alpine Rose (2009)
- Prix du Jockey Club – (6) – Darshaan (1984), Mouktar (1985), Natroun (1987), Dalakhani (2003), Darsi (2006), Reliable Man (2011)
- Prix Lupin – (1) – Dalakhani (2003)
- Prix Marcel Boussac – (2) – Zarkava (2007), Rosanara (2009)
- Prix Morny - (1) - Chargé d'Affaires (1997)
- Prix du Moulin de Longchamp – (3) – Ashkalani (1996), Sendawar (1999), Darjina (2007)
- Prix de l'Opéra – (2) – Mandesha (2006), Dalkala (2013)
- Prix Royal-Oak – (3) – Tiraaz (1998), Vazirabad (2015, 2016)
- Prix Saint-Alary – (6) – Behera (1989), Zainta (1998), Belle et Celebre (2008), Sarafina (2010), Sagawara (2012), Vazira (2014)
- Prix Vermeille – (7) – Sharaya (1983), Darara (1986), Daryaba (1999), Shawanda (2005), Mandesha (2006), Zarkava (2008), Shareta (2012)

Australia

- Melbourne Cup – (1) – Americain (2010)

Canada

- E.P. Taylor Stakes – (2) – Khariyda (1987), Reggane (2010)

Germany

- Bayerisches Zuchtrennen – (1) – Kartajana (1991)
- Preis von Europa – (1) – Sumayr (1985)

(United Kingdom) Great Britain

- Champion Stakes – (1) – Pride (2006)
- Falmouth Stakes – (1) – Giofra (2012)
- St James's Palace Stakes – (1) – Sendawar (1999)
- Yorkshire Oaks – (1) – Shareta (2012)

Hong Kong

- Hong Kong Cup – (1) – Pride (2006)
- Hong Kong Vase – (1) – Daryakana (2009)

(Republic of Ireland) Ireland

- Irish Oaks – (2) – Shawanda (2005), Chicquita (2013)

Italy

- Derby Italiano – (1) – Houmayoun (1990)
- Gran Premio di Milano – (2) – Dark Moondancer (1999), Shamdala (2006)
- Premio Lydia Tesio – (1) – Pracer (1993)
- Premio Vittorio di Capua – (1) – Linngari (2007)

United States

- Breeders' Cup Turf – (1) – Lashkari (1984)
- Secretariat Stakes – (1) – Bayrir (2012)

United Arab Emirates

- Dubai Sheema Classic – (1)- Dolniya (2015)
