= Prix de Diane =

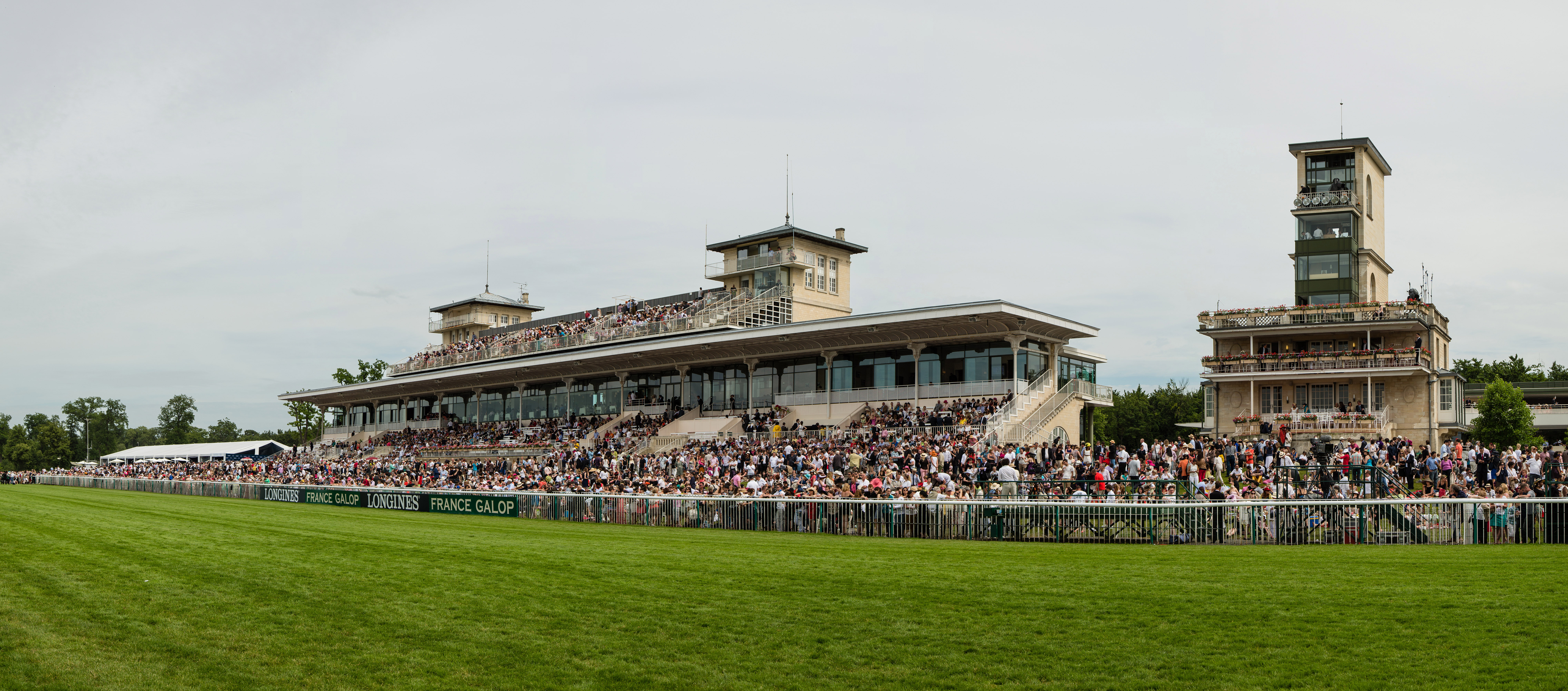
- The Chantilly Grandstand at the 2013 Prix de Diane
- Class: Group 1
- Location: Chantilly Racecourse; Chantilly, France
- Inaugurated: 18 May 1843
- Race type: Flat / Thoroughbred
- Sponsor: Longines
- Website: Official website

Race information
- Distance: 2,100 metres (1m 2½f)
- Surface: Turf
- Track: Right-handed
- Qualification: Three-year-old fillies
- Weight: 57 kg
- Purse: €1,000,000 (2022); 1st: €571,400

Prix de Diane
2026
Diamond Necklace	Pink Panthera	Inis Mor

Previous years
2025
Gezora	Bedtime Story	Cankoura
2024
Sparkling Plenty	Survie	Tamfana
2023
Blue Rose Cen	Never Ending Story	Tasmania
2022
Nashwa	La Parisienne	Rosacea
2021
Joan Of Arc	Philomene	Burgarita

2020-2011
2020
Fancy Blue	Alpine Star	Peaceful
2019
Channel	Commes	Grand Glory
2018
Laurens	Musis Amica	Homerique
2017
Senga	Sistercharlie	Terrakova
2016
La Cressonniere	Left Hand	Volta
2015
Star Of Seville	Physiocrate	Little Nightingale
2014
Avenir Certain	Amour A Papa	Xcellence
2013
Treve	Chicquita	Silasol
2012
Valyra	Beauty Parlour	Rjwa
2011
Golden Lilac	Galikova	Glorious Sight

2010–2001
2010
Sarafina	Rosanara	Sandbar
2009
Stacelita	Tamazirte	Plumania
2008
Zarkava	Gagnoa	Goldikova
2007
West Wind	Mrs Lindsay	Diyakalanie
2006
Confidential Lady	Germance	Queen Cleopatra
2005
Divine Proportions	Argentina	Paita
2004
Latice	Millionaia	Grey Lilas
2003
Nebraska Tornado	Time Ahead	Musical Chimes
2002
Bright Sky	Dance Routine	Ana Marie
2001
Aquarelliste	Nadia	Time Away

2000–1991
2000
Egyptband	Volvoreta	Goldamix
1999
Daryaba	Star Of Akkar	Visionnaire
1998
Zainta	Abbatiale	Insight
1997
Vereva	Mousse Glacee	Brilliance
1996
Sil Sila	Miss Tahiti	Matiya
1995
Carling	Matiara	Tryphosa
1994
East Of The Moon	Her Ladyship	Agathe
1993
Shemaka	Baya	Dancienne
1992
Jolypha	Sheba Dancer	Verveine
1991
Caerlina	Magic Night	Louve Romaine

1990–1986
1990
Rafha	Moon Cactus	Air De Rien
1989
Lady In Silver	Louveterie	Premier Amour
1988
Resless Kara	Riviere D'Or	Raintree Renegade
1987
Indian Skimmer	Miesque	Masmouda
1986
Lacovia	Secret Form	Galunpe

The Prix de Diane, sometimes referred to as the French Oaks, is one of the most important and prestigious Group 1 horse races in France open to three-year-old thoroughbred fillies. It is run at Chantilly over a distance of 2,100 metres (about 1 mile and 2½ furlongs), and it is scheduled to take place each year in June. It is one of four races in France with a purse of a million euros or more.

It is France's equivalent of The Oaks, a famous race in England.

Over 40,000 people from around the world attend the races to not only watch the races and bet on horses, but also to showcase the latest fashion trends.

== History ==
The event is named after the mythological goddess Diana (in French, "Diane"). It was established in 1843, and was originally restricted to horses born and bred in France. Its distance was set at 2,100 metres, around 300 metres shorter than the English version. It was switched to Versailles during the Revolution of 1848, and was cancelled due to the Franco-Prussian War in 1871.

The Prix de Diane was abandoned throughout World War I, with no running from 1915 to 1918. The first two post-war editions were held at Longchamp, and it returned to Chantilly in 1921. It took place at Longchamp again in 1936.

The race was cancelled once during World War II, in 1940. It was staged at Longchamp in 1941 and 1942, and at Le Tremblay over 2,150 metres in 1943 and 1944. It returned to Longchamp for the following three years, and on the second occasion it was opened to foreign participants. The first foreign-trained horse to win was Sweet Mimosa in 1970.

The present system of race grading was introduced in 1971, and the Prix de Diane was classed at the highest level, Group 1. A strike by stable lads caused the 1975 running to be abandoned. That year's favourite had been Ivanjica.

The event was sponsored by Revlon from 1977 to 1982, and by Hermès from 1983 to 2007. It was not sponsored from 2008 to 2010, and has been backed by Longines since 2011.

Two fillies have won both the Prix de Diane and the English Oaks – Fille de l'Air in 1864 and Pawneese in 1976. Six Prix de Diane winners have subsequently won the Prix de l'Arc de Triomphe, most recently Treve in 2013.

== Records ==
Leading jockey (5 wins):

- Spreoty – Serenade (1848), Hervine (1851), Dame d'Honneur (1856), Mademoiselle de Chantilly (1857), Etoile du Nord (1858)
- Charles Pratt – Geologie (1859), Finlande (1861), Stradella (1862), Fille de l'Air (1864), Sornette (1870)
- Yves Saint-Martin – La Sega (1962), Rescousse (1972), Allez France (1973), Pawneese (1976), Madelia (1977)
- Gérald Mossé – Restless Kara (1988), Shemaka (1993), Vereva (1997), Zainta (1998), Daryaba (1999)

Leading trainer (9 wins):

- Henry Jennings – Nativa (1843), Lanterne (1844), Dorade (1846), Serenade (1848), Fleur de Marie (1850), Geologie (1859), Surprise (1860), Destinee (1874), Tyrolienne (1875)

Leading owner (7 wins):

- HH Aga Khan IV – Shemaka (1993), Vereva (1997), Zainta (1998), Daryaba (1999), Zarkava (2008), Sarafina (2010), Valyra (2012)

== Winners since 1969 ==
Year	Winner	Jockey	Trainer	Owner	Time
1969	Crepellana	Roger Poincelet	Maurice Vacquet	Marcel Boussac	2:12.10
1970	Sweet Mimosa	Bill Williamson	Seamus McGrath	Seamus McGrath	2:11.00
1971	Pistol Packer	Freddy Head	Alec Head	Ghislaine Head	2:12.20
1972	Rescousse	Yves Saint-Martin	Geoffroy Watson	Baron de Redé	2:10.30
1973	Allez France	Yves Saint-Martin	Albert Klimscha	Daniel Wildenstein	2:07.50
1974	Highclere	Joe Mercer	Dick Hern	Queen Elizabeth II	2:07.70
	no race 1975 (Note: The 1975 running was cancelled because of a strike by stable-staff)
1976	Pawneese	Yves Saint-Martin	Angel Penna Sr.	Daniel Wildenstein	2:09.00
1977	Madelia	Yves Saint-Martin	Angel Penna Sr.	Daniel Wildenstein	2:10.30
1978	Reine de Saba	Freddy Head	Alec Head	Jacques Wertheimer	2:09.40
1979	Dunette	Georges Doleuze	E. Chevalier du Fau	Mrs Harry Love	2:08.60
1980	Mrs Penny	Lester Piggott	Ian Balding	Eric Kronfeld	2:10.10
1981	Madam Gay	Lester Piggott	Paul Kelleway	Geoffrey Kaye	2:06.50
1982	Harbour	Freddy Head	Criquette Head	Ecurie Aland	2:16.80
1983	Escaline	Gary W. Moore	John Fellows	Mrs John Fellows	2:07.80
1984	Northern Trick	Cash Asmussen	François Boutin	Stavros Niarchos	2:11.60
1985	Lypharita	Lester Piggott	André Fabre	Luay Tewfik Al Swaidi	2:05.90
1986	Lacovia	Freddy Head	François Boutin	Gerry Oldham	2:07.00
1987	Indian Skimmer	Steve Cauthen	Henry Cecil	Sheikh Mohammed	2:11.40
1988	Resless Kara	Gérald Mossé	François Boutin	Jean-Luc Lagardère	2:07.50
1989	Lady in Silver	Tony Cruz	Roger Wojtowiez	Mahmoud Abdul Karim	2:10.60
1990	Rafha	Willie Carson	Henry Cecil	Prince A. A. Faisal	2:11.70
1991	Caerlina	Éric Legrix	Jean de Roualle	Kaichi Nitta	2:10.50
1992	Jolypha	Pat Eddery	André Fabre	Khalid Abdullah	2:09.50
1993	Shemaka	Gérald Mossé	Alain de Royer-Dupré	Aga Khan IV	2:16.00
1994	East of the Moon	Cash Asmussen	François Boutin	Stavros Niarchos	2:07.90
1995	Carling	Thierry Thulliez	Corine Barande-Barbe	Ecurie Delbart	2:07.70
1996	Sil Sila	Cash Asmussen	Bryan Smart	Luis Álvarez Cervera	2:07.30
1997	Vereva	Gérald Mossé	Alain de Royer-Dupré	Aga Khan IV	2:08.20
1998	Zainta	Gérald Mossé	Alain de Royer-Dupré	Aga Khan IV	2:11.20
1999	Daryaba	Gérald Mossé	Alain de Royer-Dupré	Aga Khan IV	2:16.10
2000	Egyptband	Olivier Doleuze	Criquette Head	Wertheimer et Frère	2:08.50
2001	Aquarelliste	Dominique Boeuf	Élie Lellouche	Daniel Wildenstein	2:09.50
2002	Bright Sky	Dominique Boeuf	Élie Lellouche	Ecurie Wildenstein	2:07.60
2003	Nebraska Tornado	Richard Hughes	André Fabre	Khalid Abdullah	2:08.10
2004	Latice	Christophe Soumillon	Jean-Marie Béguigné	Enrico Ciampi	2:07.00
2005	Divine Proportions	Christophe Lemaire	Pascal Bary	Niarchos Family	2:06.30
2006	Confidential Lady	Seb Sanders	Mark Prescott	Cheveley Park Stud	2:05.90
2007	West Wind	Frankie Dettori	Henri-Alex Pantall	Sheikh Mohammed	2:06.30
2008	Zarkava	Christophe Soumillon	Alain de Royer-Dupré	Aga Khan IV	2:07.10
2009	Stacelita	Christophe Lemaire	Jean-Claude Rouget	Schwartz / Monastic	2:06.23
2010	Sarafina	Christophe Lemaire	Alain de Royer-Dupré	Aga Khan IV	2:07.80
2011	Golden Lilac	Maxime Guyon	André Fabre	Gestüt Ammerland	2:07.90
2012	Valyra	Johnny Murtagh	Jean-Claude Rouget	Aga Khan IV	2:10.11
2013	Treve	Thierry Jarnet	Criquette Head	Haras du Quesnay	2:03.77
2014	Avenir Certain	Grégory Benoist	Jean-Claude Rouget	Caro / Augustin-Normand	2:05.37
2015	Star of Seville	Frankie Dettori	John Gosden	Lady Bamford	2:05.69
2016	La Cressonniere	Cristian Demuro	Jean-Claude Rouget	Caro / Augustin-Normand	2:09.45
2017	Senga	Stéphane Pasquier	Pascal Bary	Niarchos Family	2:05.97
2018	Laurens	P. J. McDonald	Karl Burke	John Dance	2:06.11
2019	Channel	Pierre-Charles Boudot	Francis-Henri Graffard	Samuel De Barros	2:08.70
2020	Fancy Blue (Note: The 2020 race was run in July due to the COVID-19 pandemic in France)	Pierre-Charles Boudot	Donnacha O'Brien	Tabor / Smith / Magnier	2:05.46
2021	Joan of Arc	Ioritz Mendizabal	Aidan O'Brien	Tabor / Smith / Magnier	2:09.05
2022	Nashwa	Hollie Doyle	John & Thady Gosden	Imad Alsagar	2:06.63
2023	Blue Rose Cen	Aurelien Lemaitre	Christopher Head	Yeguada Centurion SL	2:05.09
2024	Sparkling Plenty	Tony Piccone	Patrice Cottier	Jean-Pierre-Joseph Dubois	2:07.64
2025	Gezora	Christophe Soumillon	Francis-Henri Graffard	White Birch Farm	2:06.57
2026	Diamond Necklace	Ryan Moore	Aidan O'Brien	Tabor / Smith / Magnier / Westerberg	2:03:78

== Earlier winners ==
- 1843: Nativaa
- 1844: Lanterne
- 1845: Suavita
- 1846: Dorade
- 1847: Wirthschaft
- 1848: Serenade
- 1849: Vergogne
- 1850: Fleur de Marie
- 1851: Hervine
- 1852: Bounty
- 1853: Jouvence
- 1854: Honesty
- 1855: Ronzi
- 1856: Dame d'Honneur
- 1857: Mademoiselle de Chantilly
- 1858: Etoile du Nord
- 1859: Geologie
- 1860: Surprise
- 1861: Finlande
- 1862: Stradella
- 1863: La Toucques
- 1864: Fille de l'Air
- 1865: Deliane
- 1866: Victorieuse
- 1867: Jeune Premiere
- 1868: Jenny
- 1869: Peripetie
- 1870: Sornette
- 1871: no race
- 1872: Little Agnes
- 1873: Campeche
- 1874: Destinee *
- 1875: Tyrolienne *
- 1876: Mondaine
- 1877: La Jonchere
- 1878: Brie
- 1879: Nubienne
- 1880: Versigny
- 1881: Serpolette
- 1882: Mademoiselle de Senlis
- 1883: Verte Bonne
- 1884: Fregate
- 1885: Barberine
- 1886: Presta
- 1887: Bavarde
- 1888: Solange
- 1889: Criniere
- 1890: Wandora
- 1891: Primrose
- 1892: Annita
- 1893: Praline
- 1894: Brisk
- 1895: Kasbah
- 1896: Liane
- 1897: Roxelane
- 1898: Cambridge
- 1899: Germaine
- 1900: Semendria
- 1901: La Camargo
- 1902: Kizil Kourgan
- 1903: Rose de Mai
- 1904: Profane
- 1905: Clyde
- 1906: Flying Star
- 1907: Saint Astra
- 1908: Medeah
- 1909: Union
- 1910: Marsa
- 1911: Rose Verte
- 1912: Qu'elle Est Belle
- 1913: Moia
- 1914: Alerte
- 1915–18: no race
- 1919: Quenouille
- 1920: Flowershop
- 1921: Doniazade
- 1922: Pellsie
- 1923: Quoi
- 1924: Uganda
- 1925: Aquatinte
- 1926: Dorina
- 1927: Fairy Legend
- 1928: Mary Legend
- 1929: Ukrania
- 1930: Commanderie
- 1931: Pearl Cap
- 1932: Perruche Bleue
- 1933: Vendange
- 1934: Adargatis
- 1935: Peniche
- 1936: Mistress Ford
- 1937: En Fraude
- 1938: Feerie
- 1939: Lysistrata
- 1940: no race
- 1941: Sapotille
- 1942: Vigilance
- 1943: Caravelle
- 1944: Pointe a Pitre
- 1945: Nikellora
- 1946: Pirette
- 1947: Montenica
- 1948: Corteira
- 1949: Bagheera
- 1950: Aglae Grace
- 1951: Stratonice
- 1952: Seria
- 1953: La Sorellina
- 1954: Tahiti
- 1955: Douve
- 1956: Apollonia
- 1957: Cerisoles
- 1958: Dushka
- 1959: Barquette
- 1960: Timandra
- 1961: Hermieres
- 1962: La Sega
- 1963: Belle Ferronniere
- 1964: Belle Sicambre
- 1965: Blabla
- 1966: Fine Pearl
- 1967: Gazala
- 1968: Roseliere

* The 1874 and 1875 races finished as dead-heats, but each was decided by a run-off.

== See also ==
- List of French flat horse races
