= 1976 Prix de l'Arc de Triomphe =

- Location: Longchamp Racecourse
- Date: October 3, 1976
- Winning horse: Ivanjica

The 1976 Prix de l'Arc de Triomphe was a horse race held at Longchamp on Sunday 3 October 1976. It was the 55th running of the Prix de l'Arc de Triomphe.

The winner was Jacques Wertheimer's Ivanjica, a four-year-old filly trained in France by Alec Head and ridden by the trainer's son Freddy Head. Alec Head was recording his third win in the race following Nuccio (1952) and Saint Crespin (1959). Freddy was also winning the race for third time after Bon Mot in 1966 and San San in 1972.

== The contenders ==
In French racing, horses in the same ownership are usually "coupled" and treated as a single entry for betting purposes. The favourites for the race were the French-trained three-year-old colts Youth and Exceller, who were coupled in the betting as both were owned by Nelson Bunker Hunt. Youth had won four of his five races in 1976 including the Prix Lupin, Prix du Jockey Club and Prix Niel, whilst Exceller had won the Grand Prix de Paris by four lengths. Also strongly fancied was Bruni a British four-year-old who had won the St Leger Stakes by ten lengths in 1975 and added victories in the Yorkshire Cup and Cumberland Lodge Stakes in 1976. The other leading French contenders were the Daniel Wildenstein entry of Crow (St Leger Stakes) and Pawneese (Oaks Stakes, King George VI and Queen Elizabeth Stakes) and the Jacques Wertheimer entry comprising Riverqueen (Poule d'Essai des Pouliches, Prix Saint-Alary, Grand Prix de Saint-Cloud) and Ivanjica, winner of the Poule d'Essai des Pouliches and Prix Vermeille in 1975. The other international challengers included Noble Dancer from Norway and Duke of Maralade from Italy. Youth/Exceller headed the betting at odds of 2/1, with Bruni on 2.5/1, Crow/Pawneese on 5.25/1 and Riverqueen/Ivanjica on 7.1/1.

== The race ==
Pawneese started quickly and disputed the lead with the outsider Kasteel with the pair drawing clear of the rest of the field at half way with Youth, Crow and Bruni prominent among the chasing group. The leaders' advantage diminished as they approached the final turn and although Pawneese led the field into the straight, she was soon overtaken by Kasteel who was in turn headed by Youth, with Crow and Bruni also moving forward. Ivanjica, who had been last in the early stages after tracking sharply to the right from her outside draw, was making steady progress along the inside. Crow moved past Youth and Bruni 400 metres from the finish and looked the likely winner, but Ivanjica produced a "brilliant finishing burst" to take the lead 100 metres from the finish and won going away by two lengths from Crow, with Youth taking third ahead of Noble Dancer and Bruni.

== Race details ==
- Sponsor: none
- Purse:
- Going: Soft
- Distance: 2,400 metres
- Number of runners: 20
- Winner's time: 2:39.4

== Full result ==
Pos.	Marg.	Horse	Age	Jockey	Trainer (Country)
1		Ivanjica	4	Freddy Head	Alec Head (FR)
2	2	Crow	3	Yves Saint-Martin	Angel Penna Sr. (FR)
3	3	Youth	3	Bill Pyers	Maurice Zilber (FR)
4	snk	Noble Dancer	4	Geoff Lewis	T Dahl (NOR)
5	1½	Bruni	4	Lester Piggott	Ryan Price (GB)
6	½	Beau Buck	5	Jean-Claude Desaint	John Cunnington (FR)
7	¾	Infra Green	4	M Depalmas	Edouard Bartholomew (FR)
8	5	Java Rajah	3	Frankie Durr	Scobie Breasley (FR)
9	¾	On My Way	6	Alfred Gibert	N Pelat (FR)
10	hd	Kasteel	4	G Rivases	J de Choubersky (FR)
11	5	Pawneese	3	Pat Eddery	Angel Penna Sr. (FR)
12	½	Arctic Tern	3	Maurice Philipperon	John Fellows (FR)
13	10	Trepan	4	Joe Mercer	François Boutin (FR)
14	6	Lagunette	3	Alain Lequeux	François Boutin (FR)
15	shd	Floressa	3	J-P Lefevre	P. Lallie (FR)
16	5	Duke of Marmalade	5	Georges Doleuze	M Bertini (ITA)
17	5	Riverqueen	3	Robert Jallu	Christian Datessen (FR)
18	10	Twig Moss	3	Tony Murray	Charles Milbank (FR)
19		Exceller	3	Gerard Dubroeucq	François Mathet (FR)
20		Dakota	5	Sandy Barclay	Sam Hall (GB)

* Abbreviations: ns = nose; shd = short-head; hd = head; snk = short neck; nk = neck

== Winner's details ==
Further details of the winner, Ivanjica.

- Sex: Filly
- Foaled: 3 May 1972
- Country: United States
- Sire: Sir Ivor; Dam: Astuce (Vieux Manoir)
- Owner: Jacques Wertheimer
- Breeder: Jacques Wertheimer
