= Lagunette =

French-bred Thoroughbred racehorse

- Sire: Val de Loir
- Grandsire: Vieux Manoir
- Dam: Landerinette
- Damsire: Sicambre
- Sex: Mare
- Foaled: 17 April 1973
- Country: France
- Colour: Bay
- Breeder: Henry Berlin
- Owner: Marius Berghgracht; Walter Haefner
- Trainer: François Boutin
- Record: 12: 4-0-1

Major wins
- Prix des Tuileries (1976); Irish Oaks (1976); Prix Vermeille (1976)

Awards
- Timeform rating 122 (1976)

Lagunette (17 April 1973 – after 1985) was a French Thoroughbred racehorse and broodmare. After winning one of her two races as a juvenile she improved to become a top-class performer in 1976, a year in which French-trained three-year-olds dominated the European classic races. After finishing third in the Prix de Diane she recorded Group One victories in the Irish Oaks and the Prix Vermeille, defeating top-quality opponents including Pawneese, Riverqueen, Sarah Siddons and Theia. Lagunette was sold at the end of 1976 but failed to win in four subsequent races and had little success as a broodmare.

== Background ==
Lagunette was a "big, strong" bay mare with a broad white blaze and four white feet bred in France by Henry Berlin. Se was one of the best horses sired by Val de Loir who won the Prix du Jockey Club in 1962 and whose other progeny included Val de l'Orne and Comtesse de Loir. Lagunette was a full-sister of The Oaks winner La Lagune, being the last of four foals produced by the unraced broodmare Landerinette. Lagunette was acquired by Marius Berghgracht and sent into training with François Boutin at Chantilly. She was ridden in most of her races by Philippe Paquet.

== Racing career ==
=== 1975: two-year-old season ===
After winning over 1600 metres on her racecourse debut, Lagunette was moved up in class and matched against colts in the Critérium de Saint-Cloud over 2000 metres on 8 November. Ridden by Philippe Paquet she started at odds of 10/1 and finished eighth of the nine runners behind Kano.

=== 1976: three-year-old season ===
Lagunette finished fourth over 2000 metres on her first appearance as a three-year-old and was then moved up in distance to win the Prix de Tuileries over 2400 metres at Longchamp Racecourse. The filly was then dropped back in distance and moved up sharply in class for the Group One Prix de Diane over 2100 metres at Chantilly Racecourse on 13 June. Starting a 28/1 outsider, she finished third behind Pawneese (winner of The Oaks) and Riverqueen (Poule d'Essai des Pouliches) but ahead of Sarah Siddons (Irish 1000 Guineas) and Theia (Critérium des Pouliches). Lagunette was then sent to Ireland for the Irish Oaks over one and a half miles at the Curragh on 17 July and started 3/1 second favourite behind Acoma who had won a minor race at Saint-Cloud Racecourse by six lengths on her only previous start. Sarah Siddons was third choice in the betting in an eighteen-runner field which alo included the Vincent O'Brien-trained I've A Bee, the Cheshire Oaks winner African Dancer, the Oaks d'Italia winner Claire Valentine and the Lupe Stakes winner Laughing Girl. Paquet had problems obtaining a clear run when switching the filly to the outside inside the final quarter mile but Lagunette accelerated in the closing stages and won by two lengths from Sarah Siddons with I've A Bee half a length away in third place.

Lagunette returned from her victory in Ireland to contest the Prix Vermeille on soft ground at Longchamp on 19 September. Pawneese, who had won the King George VI and Queen Elizabeth Stakes in July, started the odds-on favourite ahead of Riverqueen, with Lagunette, ridden as usual by Paquet, next in the betting on 14/1 in a ten-runner field which also included Sarah Siddons and Theia. Lagunette took the lead in the straight before being headed by Sarah Siddons inside the last 200 metres but rallied to defeat the Irish-trained filly by a nose after what Timeform described as a "tremendous battle". Theia finished fifth, whilst Pawneese and Riverqueen ran poorly in seventh and ninth places. On her final appearance of the season, Lagunette ran in France's most prestigious race, the Prix de l'Arc de Triomphe at Longchamp on 3 October. Ridden by Alain Lequeux she started at odds of 21/1 and finished fourteenth of the twenty runners behind Ivanjica.

In October 1976, just before her run in the Prix de l'Arc de Triomphe, Lagunette was put up for auction at the Polo club sale with a reserve price of ₣3 million, but when the bidding ended at ₣2.8 million she was led out of the ring unsold. She was later sold privately to Walter Haefner's Moyglare Stud.

=== 1977: four-year-old season ===
Lagunette remained in training with Boutin in 1977 but failed to reproduce her three-year-old form and was unplaced in her four races. She finished eighth in the Prix Ganay (ridden by Head), seventh in the Prix Jean de Chaudenay, ninth in the Grand Prix de Saint-Cloud and eighth in the Prix du Prince d'Orange.

== Assessment and awards ==
There was no International Classification of European horses in 1976: the official handicappers of Britain, Ireland and France compiled separate rankings for horses which competed in those countries. In the French Handicap she was rated the third-best three-year-old filly of the year behind Pawneese and Riverqueen. The independent Timeform organisation awarded Lagunette a rating of 122 in 1976, making her nine pounds inferior to their top-rated three-year-old filly Pawneese.

== Breeding record ==
After her retirement from racing, Lagunette became a broodmare at the Moyglare Stud. She produced five colts and one filly between 1979 and 1986. All three of her colts that raced were winners. Data Traffic, a chestnut colt sired by Irish River, had a successful turf career winning seven races out of 41 starts. Safety Feature, an unraced bay filly foaled in 1985, sired by Be My Guest produced several minor winners including Trade Dispute, who won fourteen race between 1995 and 2003.

== Pedigree ==
Pedigree of Lagunette (FR), bay mare, 1973
Sire Val de Loir (FR) 1959	Vieux Manoir (FR); 1947	Brantôme	Blandford
Sire Val de Loir (FR) 1959	Vieux Manoir (FR); 1947	Brantôme	Vitamine
Sire Val de Loir (FR) 1959	Vieux Manoir (FR); 1947	Vielle Maison	Fingals
Sire Val de Loir (FR) 1959	Vieux Manoir (FR); 1947	Vielle Maison	Vieille Canaille
Sire Val de Loir (FR) 1959	Vali (FR); 1954	Sunny Boy	Jock
Sire Val de Loir (FR) 1959	Vali (FR); 1954	Sunny Boy	Fille de Soleil
Sire Val de Loir (FR) 1959	Vali (FR); 1954	Her Slipper	Tetratema
Sire Val de Loir (FR) 1959	Vali (FR); 1954	Her Slipper	Carpet Slipper
Dam Landerinette (FR) 1953	Sicambre (FR); 1948	Prince Bio	Prince Rose
Dam Landerinette (FR) 1953	Sicambre (FR); 1948	Prince Bio	Biologie
Dam Landerinette (FR) 1953	Sicambre (FR); 1948	Sif	Rialto
Dam Landerinette (FR) 1953	Sicambre (FR); 1948	Sif	Suavita
Dam Landerinette (FR) 1953	Lais (FR); 1940	Fantastic	Aethelstan
Dam Landerinette (FR) 1953	Lais (FR); 1940	Fantastic	Fanatic
Dam Landerinette (FR) 1953	Lais (FR); 1940	Lady Chatterley	Rialto
Dam Landerinette (FR) 1953	Lais (FR); 1940	Lady Chatterley	Shameless (Family 7-e)
