= Theia (horse) =

French-bred Thoroughbred racehorse

- Sire: Caro
- Grandsire: Fortino
- Dam: Cavadonga
- Damsire: Dan Cupid
- Sex: Mare
- Foaled: 1973
- Country: France
- Colour: Grey
- Breeder: Baronne de Lopez-Taragoya
- Owner: Baronne de Lopez-Taragoya; Forest Acres
- Trainer: Raymond Touflan; David Hofmans
- Record: 18:5-4-3

Major wins
- Prix du Calvados (1975); Critérium des Pouliches (1975); Prix Vanteaux (1976); Prix de la Nonette (1976)

Awards
- Timeform rating 128 (1975), 117 (1976), 121 (1977), 125 (1978); Timeform best two-year-old filly (1975); Top-rated French two-year-old filly (1975)

Theia (1973 – after 1989) was a French Thoroughbred racehorse and broodmare. She was widely regarded as the best European filly of her generation in 1975, when she was unbeaten in three races including the Prix du Calvados and the Critérium des Pouliches. In the following year she added wins in the Prix Vanteaux and Prix de la Nonette and finished second in a strongly-contested renewal of the Prix Saint-Alary, but appeared to be just below top class. She was later exported to race in the United States, where she campaigned with limited success. She was later a useful broodmare, producing several winners.

== Background ==
Although officially described a bay during her racing career, Theia was a grey mare with a white blaze and three white socks bred in France by her owner Baronne de Lopez-Taragoya. Her sire, Caro, was a top-class performer (rated 133 by Timeform), whose wins included the Poule d'Essai des Poulains, Prix Ganay and Prix d'Ispahan, before becoming a very successful breeding stallion. Caro's other progeny included Madelia, Crystal Palace, Cozzene and Winning Colors. Theia's dam Cavadonga won as a two-year-old and produced several other winners. Theia was trained during her racing career by Raymond Touflan.

== Racing career ==
=== 1975: two-year-old season ===
Theia, who had been the subject of very positive reports from her performances in training, made her debut in a maiden race over 1200 metres at Deauville Racecourse in August. She took the lead 400 metres from the finish and won by three lengths. Later that month, at the same course, Theia was moved up in class for the Prix du Calvados and started favourite against twelve opponents. She was among the leaders from the start, took the lead 300 metres from the finish and held off a late challenge from Antrona to win by a neck.

On 5 October, Theia, ridden by Yves Saint-Martin, started the 3/1 favourite for France's premier race for juvenile fillies, the Critérium des Pouliches over 1600 metres at Longchamp Racecourse. She was again opposed by Antrona as well as Imogene, a Maurice Zilber-trained filly who had run second to Vitiges in the Prix Morny. Theia tracked the leaders before making a forward move in the straight. She took the lead in the closing stages and won by three-quarters of a length from Antrona, who was subsequently disqualified for causing interference.

=== 1976: three-year-old season ===
Theia began her second season in the Group Three Prix Vanteaux over 1900 metres at Longchamp on 19 April. Ridden by Freddie Head she started favourite and took her winning run to four, but finished only a head in front of the runner-up Elise Ma Belle. At the same course on 23 May, she was matched against Riverqueen (Poule d'Essai des Pouliches) and Flying Water (1000 Guineas) in the Prix Saint-Alary. Ridden by Henri Samani she finished strongly but was beaten three quarters of a length by Riverqueen, with Antrona in third, Kesar Queen (later to win the Coronation Stakes) in fourth and Flying Water in seventh. Theia started third favourite, at odds of 19/4 for the Prix de Diane at Chantilly Racecourse on 13 June, but finished fifth of the eleven runners, seven lengths behind the winner Pawneese.

After a break of two months, Theia returned in the Prix de la Côte Normande at Deauville Racecourse on 12 August in which she was matched against colts for the first time. She started the 5/4 favourite, but finished third of the eleven runners behind Iron Duke and Cheraw. On 5 September, Theia, ridden by Gerard Dubroeucq, started 2.3/1 second favourite behind Antrona in the Group Three Prix de la Nonette over 2100 metres at Longchamp. She recorded her fifth win, beating Antrona by half a length, with No No Nanette a length and a half away in third place. Two weeks later she was moved up in distance for the Prix Vermeille over 2400 metres and finished fifth behind the François Boutin-trained Lagunette. After finishing fourth behind the four-year-old Dona Barod in the Prix de l'Opéra on 3 October she was sent to England for the Champion Stakes in which she finished unplaced behind Vitiges.

=== 1977–1978: later career ===
As a four-year-old, Theia entered the ownership of Forest Acres stable and was sent California where she was trained by David Hofmans. She failed to win in seven starts in the United States but produced several good efforts in defeat. She did not race until August when she finished second in an allowance race at Del Mar Racetrack before running unplaced in the Grade III Ramona Handicap at the same track. All of her subsequent races were at Santa Anita Park. In October but and third in the . In October she ran fourth in an allowance race but then produced a much better effort when she finished second to the ex-British Swingtime in the Grade III Las Palmas Handicap. Towards the end of the season Theia ran third to Star Ball in the inaugural running of the Yellow Ribbon Stakes and third in the San Gorgonio Handicap. She ran once as a five-year-old, finishing third in an allowance race in January 1978.

== Assessment ==
There was no International Classification of European two-year-olds in 1975: the official handicappers of Britain, Ireland and France compiled separate rankings for horses which competed in those countries. In the French Free Handicap, Theia was the highest-rated juvenile filly, a pound ahead of Antrona and six pounds below the top colt Manado. The independent Timeform organisation gave her a rating of 128, and named her the best two-year-old filly of the year. In the following year she was rated 117 by Timeform, fourteen pounds inferior to their top-rated three-year-old filly Pawneese. She was rated eight pounds below Pawneese in the French Free Handicap for three-year-olds.

== Breeding record ==
Theia was retired from racing to become a broodmare in Kentucky. She was offered for sale at Keeneland in November 1983, but failed to reach her reserve price of $900,000. She produced at least eight foals and four winners between 1980 and 1989:

- One More Slew (brown colt, foaled in 1980, sired by Seattle Slew), unraced
- Tabun Bogdo (brown colt, 1982, by Seattle Slew), won one race
- Antique Lamp (brown filly, 1984, by Seattle Slew), failed to win in ten races
- Tanker Port (brown colt, 1982, by Valdez), won twelve races
- Woodleys Fee (brown filly, 1986, by Seattle Slew), won one race
- Winnie the Slew (grey colt, 1987, by Seattle Slew), failed to win in seven races
- Shrewd Vixen (grey filly, 1988, by Spectacular Bid), won six races, dam of Bare Necessities (Sixty Sails Handicap, Gardenia Handicap)
- Slewpercilious (grey filly, 1989, by Slewpy), unraced

== Pedigree ==
Pedigree of Theia (FR), grey mare, 1973
Sire Caro (IRE) 1967	Fortino (FR); 1959	Grey Sovereign	Nasrullah
Sire Caro (IRE) 1967	Fortino (FR); 1959	Grey Sovereign	Kong
Sire Caro (IRE) 1967	Fortino (FR); 1959	Ranavalo	Relic
Sire Caro (IRE) 1967	Fortino (FR); 1959	Ranavalo	Navarra
Sire Caro (IRE) 1967	Chambord (GB); 1955	Chamossaire	Precipitation
Sire Caro (IRE) 1967	Chambord (GB); 1955	Chamossaire	Snowberry
Sire Caro (IRE) 1967	Chambord (GB); 1955	Life Hill	Solario
Sire Caro (IRE) 1967	Chambord (GB); 1955	Life Hill	Lady of the Snows
Dam Cavadonga (FR) 1965	Dan Cupid (USA); 1956	Native Dancer	Polynesian
Dam Cavadonga (FR) 1965	Dan Cupid (USA); 1956	Native Dancer	Geisha
Dam Cavadonga (FR) 1965	Dan Cupid (USA); 1956	Vixenette	Sickle
Dam Cavadonga (FR) 1965	Dan Cupid (USA); 1956	Vixenette	Lady Reynard
Dam Cavadonga (FR) 1965	Edjele (FR); 1957	Djerik	Djebel
Dam Cavadonga (FR) 1965	Edjele (FR); 1957	Djerik	La Tour Vesone
Dam Cavadonga (FR) 1965	Edjele (FR); 1957	Castel Amour	Chateauroux
Dam Cavadonga (FR) 1965	Edjele (FR); 1957	Castel Amour	Djebel Amour (Family: 16-g)
