= Riverqueen =

French-bred Thoroughbred racehorse

- Sire: Luthier
- Grandsire: Klairon
- Dam: Riverside
- Damsire: Sheshoon
- Sex: Mare
- Foaled: 1973
- Country: France
- Colour: Bay
- Breeder: Societe Aland
- Owner: Ghislaine Head
- Trainer: Christian Datessen
- Record: 8:5-1-0

Major wins
- Prix de la Grotte (1976); Poule d'Essai des Pouliches (1976); Prix Saint-Alary (1976); Grand Prix de Saint-Cloud (1976)

Awards
- Timeform rating ? (1975), 128 (1976)

Riverqueen (1973 – after 1989) was a French Thoroughbred racehorse and broodmare. After winning her only race as a two-year-old she emerged as one of the best fillies in Europe in the spring and summer of 1976, winning the Prix de la Grotte, Poule d'Essai des Pouliches and Prix Saint-Alary. After her winning run was brought to an end by Pawneese in the Prix de Diane she rebounded to become the first three-year-old filly to win the weight-for-age Grand Prix de Saint-Cloud. After running poorly in her last two races she was retired from racing and had some success as a broodmare. Her last recorded foal was born in 1989.

== Background ==
Riverqueen was a bay mare with a small white star bred in France by the Head family's Ecurie Aland. She was sired by Luthier, a French horse who won the Prix Jacques Le Marois in 1968 and became a very successful breeding stallion whose other progeny included the Prix de l'Arc de Triomphe winner Sagace. Luthier was a representative of the Byerley Turk sire line, unlike more than 95% of modern thoroughbreds, who descend directly from the Darley Arabian. Riverqueen's dam Riverside was a high-class racemare who won the Prix de Royallieu in 1969 and a granddaughter of Refreshed, who finished third in the 1000 Guineas and was a half-ister of Festoon. Riverside's half-sister Lorn Lady produced the Prix de Diane winner Lady In Silver.

The filly was sent into training with Christian Datessen in France and was ridden in most of her races by Freddie Head.

== Racing career ==
=== 1975: two-year-old season ===
Riverqueen made her racecourse debut in a maiden race over 1700 metres at Saint-Cloud Racecourse in October 1975. She won in "very promising" style by three lengths from fourteen opponents.

=== 1976: three-year-old season ===
Riverqueen began her second season in the Group Three Prix de la Grotte over 1600 metres at Longchamp Racecourse on 11 April and started the 5.4/1 third favourite behind Antrona (winner of the Prix d'Aumale) and Paint The Town. She was restrained by Freddy Head in the early stages before taking the lead in the straight and winning by two and a half lengths from Kesar Queen (later to win the Coronation Stakes) with Antrona two lengths back in third. Three weeks later, the filly started 4/5 favourite for the Group One Poule d'Essai des Pouliches over the same court and distance. As in her previous start, she was not among the early leaders, but took the lead in the straight and won by three lengths from Suvannee, a filly who had won the Prix des Réservoirs and finished second to Theia in the Prix Marcel Boussac. On 23 May, Riverqueen started favourite for an exceptionally strong field for the Group One Prix Saint-Alary over 2000 metres at Longchamp. Apart from Suvannee, Antrona and Kesar Queen, the field included the 1000 Guineas winner Flying Water and Theia, the top-rated two-year-old French filly of 1975. Riverqueen took the lead from Kesar Queen 300 metres from the finish and held off several challengers in the closing stages to win by three quarters of a length from Theia, with Antrona and Suvannee close behind in third and fourth places.

On 20 June, Riverqueen was matched against The Oaks winner Pawneese in the Prix de Diane over 2100 metres at Chantilly Racecourse. Theia and Antrona were again amongst the opposition as well as the Irish 1000 Guineas winner Sarah Siddons. Pawneese led from the start, whereas Riverqueen was restrained by Head towards the rear of the field, before moving forward early in the straight. She never looked likely to get on terms with Pawneese and was beaten one and half lengths, with the 28/1 outsider Lagunette (later to win the Irish Oaks) in third. Some observers felt that Head had given the filly too much ground to make up in the closing stages. Two weeks later, Riverqueen was matched against older horses for the first time in the 2500 metre Grand Prix de Saint-Cloud, a race which had never been won by a three-year-old filly. Her main rivals in a seven-runner field were Ashmore (runner-up in the race in 1975), Maitland (Prix Jean de Chaudenay), the British challengers Quiet Fling (Coronation Cup) and Libra's Rib and the stayer Citoyen. Riverqueen settled in fifth place as Maitland and Citoyen before moving up to dispute the lead with Ashmore in the last 400 metres. She took the advantage in the closing stages and won by half a length from Ashmore, with Tip Moss two lengths back in third place.

Riverqueen failed to sustain her form into the autumn. Following reports that she had defeated the four-year-old filly Ivanjica in a trial gallop she started 2/1 second favourite behind Pawneese in the Prix Vermeille at Longchamp on 19 September but ran very poorly, finishing ninth of the ten runners, almost twenty lengths behind the upset winner Lagunette. Freddie Head opted to ride Ivanjica in the Prix de l'Arc de Triomphe on 3 October, leaving Robert Jallu to take the ride on Riverqueen. She was never in contention and finished seventeenth of the twenty runners behind Ivanjica. Timeform speculated that the filly may either have been worn out by her earlier campaign or been unsuited by the very soft ground conditions which prevailed that autumn.

== Assessment ==
There was no International Classification of European two-year-olds in 1975: the official handicappers of Britain, Ireland and France compiled separate rankings for horses which competed in those countries. Riverqueen was not given a rating in the French Free Handicap. The independent Timeform organisation, in their annual Racehorses of 1975 felt that there was insufficient data to award Riverqueen a rating but described her as "sure to go on to better things". In 1976 Timeform gave her a rating of 128, three pounds behind their top three-year-old filly Pawneese. In the official French handicap she was ranked the second best filly to race in France, two pounds below Pawneese.

== Breeding record ==
Despite reports that she would race in 1977, Riverqueen did not race after her poor run in the Arc and was retired to become a broodmare. She produced six winners from seven runners. Her progeny included:

- Riviere Doree (chestnut filly, foaled in 1980, sired by Secretariat), winner of the Listed Prix Coronation and female-line ancestor of Rouvres (Prix Jean Prat), and the Japanese Grade II winner Vita Rosa.
- Reve de Reine (brown filly, 1981, by Lyphard), winner of three races, second in the Prix Vanteaux
- Minya (chestnut filly, 1984, by Blushing Groom), dam of Altieri who won sixteen races including two runnings of the Premio Presidente della Repubblica
- Royal Arcade (colt, 1986, by Alydar)
- Rose Blanche (chestnut filly, 1988, by Nureyev)
- Redden Queen (chestnut filly, 1989, by Bering)

== Pedigree ==
Pedigree of Riverqueen (FR), bay mare, 1973
Sire Luthier (FR) 1965	Klairon (FR); 1952	Clarion	Djebel
Sire Luthier (FR) 1965	Klairon (FR); 1952	Clarion	Columba
Sire Luthier (FR) 1965	Klairon (FR); 1952	Kalmia	Kantar
Sire Luthier (FR) 1965	Klairon (FR); 1952	Kalmia	Sweet Lavender
Sire Luthier (FR) 1965	Flute Enchantee (FR); 1950	Cranach	Coronach
Sire Luthier (FR) 1965	Flute Enchantee (FR); 1950	Cranach	Reine Isaure
Sire Luthier (FR) 1965	Flute Enchantee (FR); 1950	Montagnana	Brantôme
Sire Luthier (FR) 1965	Flute Enchantee (FR); 1950	Montagnana	Mauretania
Dam Riverside (GB) 1966	Sheshoon (GB); 1956	Precipitation	Hurry On
Dam Riverside (GB) 1966	Sheshoon (GB); 1956	Precipitation	Double Life
Dam Riverside (GB) 1966	Sheshoon (GB); 1956	Noorani	Nearco
Dam Riverside (GB) 1966	Sheshoon (GB); 1956	Noorani	Empire Glory
Dam Riverside (GB) 1966	Renounce (GB); 1957	Big Game	Bahram
Dam Riverside (GB) 1966	Renounce (GB); 1957	Big Game	Myrobella
Dam Riverside (GB) 1966	Renounce (GB); 1957	Refreshed	Hyperion
Dam Riverside (GB) 1966	Renounce (GB); 1957	Refreshed	Monsoon (Family 1-w)
