= Reine de Saba =

French-bred Thoroughbred racehorse

- Sire: Lyphard
- Grandsire: Northern Dancer
- Dam: Sirya
- Damsire: Sicambre
- Sex: Mare
- Foaled: 7 May 1975
- Country: France
- Colour: Bay
- Breeder: Jacques Wertheimer
- Owner: Jacques Wertheimer
- Trainer: Alec Head
- Record: 12: 5-1-3

Major wins
- Prix de la Seine (1978); Prix Saint-Alary (1978); Prix de Diane (1978)

Awards
- Timeform rating 125 (1978), 115 (1979); Top-rated French three-year-old filly (1978)

Reine de Saba (7 May 1975 – 1988) was a French Thoroughbred racehorse and broodmare. Bred and owned by Jacques Wertheimer and trained by Alec Head she raced for three seasons and won five of her twelve races. After showing promise as a juvenile, she emerged as one of the leading three-year-old fillies in Europe in the spring and early summer of 1978, winning all three of her races including the Prix Saint-Alary and the Prix de Diane. Her season was ended by injury in June and when she returned as a four-year-old she was less effective, winning only one of her six races. As a broodmare she produced two foals that raced and were both good winners.

== Background ==
Reine de Saba was an attractive, strongly-built bay mare with a white blaze and white socks on her own legs bred in France by her owner Jacques Wertheimer. She was from the second crop of foals sired by Lyphard, an American-bred stallion who raced in France, winning the Prix Jacques Le Marois and Prix de la Forêt in 1972. Lyphard went on to become a very successful breeding stallion in both Europe and North America, siring Three Troikas, Dancing Brave and Manila. Reine de Saba's dam Sirya was a half-sister of several good winners including Homely (winner of the Prix Yacowlef) and Trictrac, who won the Prix Eugène Adam and sired Balmerino. Wertheimer sent the filly into training with Alec Head at Chantilly. She was ridden in all of her major races by her trainer's son Freddy Head. Reine de Saba shared a breeder, owner, trainer and sire with another leading French filly of the same generation, Dancing Maid.

== Racing career ==
=== 1977: two-year-old season ===
In her first two appearances, Reine de Saba was campaigned over sprint distances, finishing third over 1100 metres and 1300 metres. In her final run as a juvenile she recorded her first win in a maiden race over 1600 metres.

=== 1978: three-year-old season ===
Reine de Saba began her second season in the Prix de la Seine over 2000 metres at Longchamp Racecourse and won by two lengths from Shelina. On 21 May the filly was moved up in class and started 11/10 favourite for the Group One Prix Saint-Alary on soft ground over 2100 metres the same course. Her opponents nine opponents were headed by Fruhlingstag, A Thousand Stars and Tempus Fugit who had finished second, third and fourth behind Dancing Maid in the Poule d'Essai des Pouliches three weeks earlier. Reine de Saba raced behind her pacemaker before Freddy Head sent her into the lead entering the straight. She was never seriously challenged, winning by two and a half lengths from the outsider Lys River, with A Thousand Stars taking third ahead of Tempus Fugit and Gayka. With Dancing Maid being sent to England for The Oaks, Reine de Saba started 3/10 favourite for the Prix de Diane at over 2100 metres Chantilly Racecourse on 11 June, being coupled in the betting with her stablemates Madge and the Prix de Royaumont winner La Dorga. Lys River, Fruhlingstag, A Thousand Stars, Gayka and Tempus Fugit were again in opposition along with Calderina (winner of the Prix de Sandringham) and the British-trained Cistus (winner of the Waterford Candelabra Stakes and the Lupe Stakes). Reine de Saba raced just behind the leaders until the straight when she moved up into second place behind Cistus. 300 metres from the finish she accelerated past the British filly to win by two lengths with Calderina in third ahead of the outsider Paddle. Reine de Saba sustained a chipped bone in her knee during the race and did not race again in 1978.

=== 1979: four-year-old season ===
Returning from a break of fourteen months, Reine de Saba returned to run third in a race over 1800 metres and then finished second, beaten half a length by Look Fast in the Prix Ridgway at Deauville Racecourse in August. She finished fourth behind Rusticaro, Trillion and Northern Baby the Prix du Prince d'Orange but then ran unplaced behind Producer when second favourite for the Prix de l'Opéra in October. Later that month she recorded her only success of the year when beating A Thousand Stars by two and a half lengths in the Prix du Point de Jour over 2000 metres at Longchamp. On her final appearance Reine de Saba was sent to California to contest the Grade I Yellow Ribbon Stakes over a mile and a quarter at Santa Anita Park and was a fast-finishing fourth behind Country Queen.

== Assessment ==
In the International Classification of three-year-old for 1978, Reine de Saba was rated the second-best filly in Europe, three pounds behind the British filly Swiss Maid and a pound superior to Dancing Maid. The independent Timeform organisation gave her a rating of 125, four pounds inferior to Swiss Maid and a pound behind Dancing Maid. A year later, Timeform rated her on 115, nine pounds behind their top-rated older female Trillon. Reine de Saba did not receive a rating in the 1979 International Classification, and was rated twelve pounds inferior to Trillion in the official French handicap.

== Breeding record ==
Reine de Saba was retired from racing at the end of 1979 and became a broodmare for the Wertheimer stud. She died in 1988 after delivering a stillborn foal. Reine de Saba produced only three live foals:

- Reine d'Egypte, a bay filly, foaled in 1981, sired by Val de l'Orne. Won three races and finished third in the Prix de Minerve. As a broodmare, she produced several winners Egyptown, who in turn produced the Prix de Diane winner Egyptband.
- Unnamed bay filly sired by Val de l'Orne, foaled in 1986.
- Never Black, a dark bay or brown colt, foaled in 1987, sired by Riverman. Won two races in France and five in the United States including the Grade III All American Handicap.

== Pedigree ==
Pedigree of Reine de Saba, bay mare, 1975
Sire Lyphard (USA) 1969	Northern Dancer (CAN); 1961	Nearctic	Nearco
Sire Lyphard (USA) 1969	Northern Dancer (CAN); 1961	Nearctic	Lady Angela
Sire Lyphard (USA) 1969	Northern Dancer (CAN); 1961	Natalma	Native Dancer
Sire Lyphard (USA) 1969	Northern Dancer (CAN); 1961	Natalma	Almahmoud
Sire Lyphard (USA) 1969	Goofed (USA); 1960	Court Martial	Fair Trial
Sire Lyphard (USA) 1969	Goofed (USA); 1960	Court Martial	Instantaneous
Sire Lyphard (USA) 1969	Goofed (USA); 1960	Barra	Formor
Sire Lyphard (USA) 1969	Goofed (USA); 1960	Barra	La Favorite
Dam Sirya (FR) 1967	Sicambre (FR); 1948	Prince Bio	Prince Rose
Dam Sirya (FR) 1967	Sicambre (FR); 1948	Prince Bio	Biologie
Dam Sirya (FR) 1967	Sicambre (FR); 1948	Sif	Rialto
Dam Sirya (FR) 1967	Sicambre (FR); 1948	Sif	Suavita
Dam Sirya (FR) 1967	Carya (GB); 1955	Rockefella	Hyperion
Dam Sirya (FR) 1967	Carya (GB); 1955	Rockefella	Rockfel
Dam Sirya (FR) 1967	Carya (GB); 1955	Sarah Madeline	Nasrullah
Dam Sirya (FR) 1967	Carya (GB); 1955	Sarah Madeline	Marshfield (Family 2-h)
