= Sagawara =

British-bred Thoroughbred racehorse

- Sire: Shamardal
- Grandsire: Giant's Causeway
- Dam: Sagalina
- Damsire: Linamix
- Sex: Mare
- Foaled: 28 April 2009
- Country: United Kingdom
- Colour: Grey
- Breeder: Aga Khan IV
- Owner: Aga Khan IV
- Trainer: Alain de Royer-Dupré
- Record: 8: 2-2-0
- Earnings: £165,012

Major wins
- Prix Saint-Alary (2012)

Sagawara (foaled 28 April 2009) is a British-bred French-trained Thoroughbred racehorse and broodmare. She showed promise as a juvenile in 2011 when she won a minor event on the second of her two starts. In the following spring she ran second on her seasonal debut in the Prix Vanteaux and then recorded her biggest success when he won the Prix Saint-Alary. For the rest of the year she was matched against top-class opposition but failed to win in four races and was retired from the track at the end of the year.

== Background ==
Sagawara is a grey mare with a white star bred in England by her owner, Aga Khan IV. She was sent into training with Alain de Royer-Dupré in France.

She was from the third crop of foals sired by Shamardal whose wins included the Dewhurst Stakes, Poule d'Essai des Poulains, Prix du Jockey Club and St James's Palace Stakes. His other offspring have included Able Friend, Mukhadram, Lope de Vega and Casamento. Sagawara's dam Sagalina, from whom she inherited her grey coat, showed no racing talent but was a daughter of the Prix de Royallieu winner Saganeca, making her a full-sister to Sagamix.

== Racing career ==
=== 2011: two-year-old season ===
Sagawara made her racecourse debut on 30 September in the Prix Esmeralda over 1600 metres at Saint-Cloud Racecourse in which she finished second of the five runners behind Beauty Parlour, a filly who went on to win the Poule d'Essai des Pouliches. In the Prix Ravinella over the same course and distance on 25 October the filly was ridden by Gregory Benoist and recorded her first success as she started the 5/2 second favourite and won by three quarters of a length from Poupee Flash.

=== 2012: three-year-old season ===
On her first run as a three-year-old Sagawara was stepped up in class for the Group 3 Prix Vanteaux at Longchamp on 29 April and started the 5/2 joint-favourite. Racing on heavy ground she kept on well in the straight but was a beaten a neck into second by Trois Lunes. Four weeks later at the same track the filly started the 9/4 second favourite in an eight-runner field for the Group 1 Prix Saint-Alary over 2000 metres. The undefeated La Peinture headed the betting while the best of the others appeared to be Rjwa (third in the Prix Penelope): with no previous Group race winners, the field appeared substandard for a top level event. Ridden by Christophe Lemaire she raced in second place behind Hasna, took the lead 200 metres from the finish and held on "gamely" to win by a short neck from Rjwa.

In the Prix de Diane over 2100 metres at Chantilly Racecourse on 17 June Sagawara started a 22/1 outsider and after being among the early leaders she was outpaced in the straight and came home eighth of the twelve runners behind Valyra. The filly was then dropped back in distance and matched against older fillies in the 1600 metre Prix Rothschild at Deauville in July. Starting the 14/1 outsider of the five runners she never looked likely to win and finished fourth to Elusive Kate. She was stepped up to 2400 metres for the Prix Vermeille in September and ran sixth to Shareta after being in second place 100 metres from the finish. In October at Longchamp, Sagawara ended her racing career by finishing unplaced in the Prix de l'Opéra.

== Breeding record ==
Sagawara was retired from racing to become a broodmare for the Aga Khan's stud. She has produced four foals:

- Chosen Angel, a filly, foaled in 2012, sired by Redoute's Choice.
- Sarafand, bay colt, 2014, by Redoute's Choice.
- Sawakiyna, filly, 2015, by Sea the Stars. Sold as a three-year-old for €220,000.
- Sanary, colt, grey 2016, Invincible Spirit. Failed to win in two races.

== Pedigree ==
Pedigree of Sagawara (GB), grey filly, 2009
Sire Shamardal (USA) 2002	Giant's Causeway; 1997	Storm Cat	Storm Bird (CAN)
Sire Shamardal (USA) 2002	Giant's Causeway; 1997	Storm Cat	Terlingua
Sire Shamardal (USA) 2002	Giant's Causeway; 1997	Mariah's Storm	Rahy
Sire Shamardal (USA) 2002	Giant's Causeway; 1997	Mariah's Storm	Immense
Sire Shamardal (USA) 2002	Helsinki (GB); 1993	Machiavellian (USA)	Mr. Prospector
Sire Shamardal (USA) 2002	Helsinki (GB); 1993	Machiavellian (USA)	Coup de Folie
Sire Shamardal (USA) 2002	Helsinki (GB); 1993	Helen Street	Troy
Sire Shamardal (USA) 2002	Helsinki (GB); 1993	Helen Street	Waterway (FR)
Dam Sagalina (IRE) 2000	Linamix (FR); 1987	Mendez	Bellypha (IRE)
Dam Sagalina (IRE) 2000	Linamix (FR); 1987	Mendez	Miss Carina
Dam Sagalina (IRE) 2000	Linamix (FR); 1987	Lunadix	Breton (GB)
Dam Sagalina (IRE) 2000	Linamix (FR); 1987	Lunadix	Lutine (GB)
Dam Sagalina (IRE) 2000	Saganeca (USA); 1988	Sagace (FR)	Luthier
Dam Sagalina (IRE) 2000	Saganeca (USA); 1988	Sagace (FR)	Seneca
Dam Sagalina (IRE) 2000	Saganeca (USA); 1988	Haglette	Hagley
Dam Sagalina (IRE) 2000	Saganeca (USA); 1988	Haglette	Sucrette (Family 11-d)
