= La Lagune (horse) =

French-bred Thoroughbred racehorse

- Sire: Val de Loir
- Grandsire: Vieux Manoir
- Dam: Landerinette
- Damsire: Sicambre
- Sex: Mare
- Foaled: 1965
- Country: France
- Colour: Bay
- Breeder: Marquis du Vivier
- Owner: Henry Berlin
- Trainer: François Boutin
- Record: 7: 3-0-1

Major wins
- Prix de Condé (1967); Prix Vanteaux (1968); Epsom Oaks (1968)

La Lagune (1965 – after 1970) was a French-bred Thoroughbred racehorse and broodmare. She initially made an impression by winning the Prix de Condé in the autumn of 1965 and added to her reputation with an emphatic victory in the Prix Vanteaux in the following spring. She was then sent to England for the Epsom Oaks and justified her position as favourite, as she ran out a very easy five length winner. She was unable to win again but ran well in defeat against very strong opposition before being retired at the end of the season. She had little chance to prove herself as a broodmare as she produced only one foal.

== Background ==
Lagunette was an "immensely strong" looking bay mare with a broad white blaze and four white socks bred near Bordeaux in France by the Marquis du Vivier. As a yearling she was consigned to the sales at Deauville and was bought for 25,000 francs (about £2,000) by François Boutin. During her racing career she was trained by Boutin at Chantilly and carried the red and white colours of Henry Berlin.

She was one of the best horses sired by Val de Loir who won the Prix du Jockey Club in 1962 and whose other progeny included Val de l'Orne and Comtesse de Loir. Her dam Landerinette was unraced but went on to produce the Irish Oaks winner Lagunette.

== Racing career ==
=== 1967: two-year-old season ===
As a two-year-old La Lagune produced her most notable performance in October when she won the Prix de Condé over 2000 metres on heavy ground at Longchamp Racecourse. Although the field included male opponents, her closest pursuer was the filly Mercuriale.

=== 1968: three-year-old season ===
The racing colours of Henry Berlin

In April at Longchamp La Lagune was one of eight fillies to contest the Prix Vanteux over 1900 metres. Ridded by Gerard Thiboeuf she won by five lengths in a performance which resulted in her being regarded as a leading contender for the Epsom Oaks. By May it appeared that her biggest obstacle in her path was the outbreak of strikes and civil unrest in France which at one point made it look as though she would be unable to travel to England.

La Lagune arrived safely at Epsom and on 31 May she started the 11/8 favourite against thirteen opponents in the 190th running of the Oaks. With Thiboeuf again in the saddle she never looked to be in serious danger and came home five lengths clear of Glad One with Pandora Bay a short head away in third. Her win was the first major success for Boutin, and led to his stable attracting many leading owners and top-class horses over the next three decades.

Having won over one and a half miles at Epsom La Lagune was dropped back in distance for the Prix de Diane over 2100 metres at Chantilly Racecourse but ran poorly and finished unplaced behind Roseliere. After a two-month break she produced a better effort on her return as she came home third behind Roseliere and Pola Bella in the Prix Vermeille. In her last two starts the filly was matched against world-class male opposition and ran creditably as she finished fifth in both the Prix de l'Arc de Triomphe and the Washington, D.C.International.

== Breeding record ==
At the end of her racing career, La Lagune became a broodmare for her owner's stud but produced only one known foal:

- Rose du Kentucky, a bay filly, foaled in 1970, sired by Bold Lad. Won one race and produced Alchimiste who won 13 races in the United States. She was also the grand-dam of Trishyde, who won the Prix de Malleret in 1992.

== Assessment and honours ==
In their book, A Century of Champions, based on the Timeform rating system, John Randall and Tony Morris rated La Lagune an "average" winner of the Oaks.

== Pedigree ==
Pedigree of La Lagune (FR), bay mare, 1965
Sire Val de Loir (FR) 1959	Vieux Manoir (FR); 1947	Brantôme	Blandford
Sire Val de Loir (FR) 1959	Vieux Manoir (FR); 1947	Brantôme	Vitamine
Sire Val de Loir (FR) 1959	Vieux Manoir (FR); 1947	Vielle Maison	Fingals
Sire Val de Loir (FR) 1959	Vieux Manoir (FR); 1947	Vielle Maison	Vieille Canaille
Sire Val de Loir (FR) 1959	Vali (FR); 1954	Sunny Boy	Jock
Sire Val de Loir (FR) 1959	Vali (FR); 1954	Sunny Boy	Fille de Soleil
Sire Val de Loir (FR) 1959	Vali (FR); 1954	Her Slipper	Tetratema
Sire Val de Loir (FR) 1959	Vali (FR); 1954	Her Slipper	Carpet Slipper
Dam Landerinette (FR) 1953	Sicambre (FR); 1948	Prince Bio	Prince Rose
Dam Landerinette (FR) 1953	Sicambre (FR); 1948	Prince Bio	Biologie
Dam Landerinette (FR) 1953	Sicambre (FR); 1948	Sif	Rialto
Dam Landerinette (FR) 1953	Sicambre (FR); 1948	Sif	Suavita
Dam Landerinette (FR) 1953	Lais (FR); 1940	Fantastic	Aethelstan
Dam Landerinette (FR) 1953	Lais (FR); 1940	Fantastic	Fanatic
Dam Landerinette (FR) 1953	Lais (FR); 1940	Lady Chatterley	Rialto
Dam Landerinette (FR) 1953	Lais (FR); 1940	Lady Chatterley	Shameless (Family 7-e)
