= Dancing Maid =

French-bred Thoroughbred racehorse

- Sire: Lyphard
- Grandsire: Northern Dancer
- Dam: Morana
- Damsire: Val de Loir
- Sex: Mare
- Foaled: 29 April 1975
- Country: France
- Colour: Bay
- Breeder: Jacques Wertheimer
- Owner: Jacques Wertheimer
- Trainer: Alec Head
- Record: 10:5-1-1

Major wins
- Prix Vanteaux (1978); Poule d'Essai des Pouliches (1978); Prix Chloé (1978); Prix Vermeille (1978)

Awards
- Timeform rating 115 (1977). 126 (1978)

Dancing Maid (29 April 1975 – 1982) was a French Thoroughbred racehorse and broodmare. After winning one of her two races as a two-year-old she emerged as one of the best fillies in Europe in 1978, winning the Prix Vanteaux, Poule d'Essai des Pouliches, Prix Chloé and Prix Vermeille. She also finished a close second in the classic Epsom Oaks and third in Europe's most prestigious all-aged race, the Prix de l'Arc de Triomphe. She was retired from racing after one unsuccessful start as a four-year-old. She was not a success as a broodmare.

== Background ==
Dancing Maid was a lightly built bay mare with a broad white blaze and three white socks bred in France by her owner Jacques Wertheimer. She was from the second crop of foals sired by Lyphard, an American-bred stallion who raced in France, winning the Prix Jacques Le Marois and Prix de la Forêt in 1972. Lyphard went on to become a very successful breeding stallion in both Europe and North America, siring Three Troikas, Dancing Brave and Manila. Dancing Maid was the third foal of her dam, Morana and a granddaughter of Moira who finished fourth in the Oaks Stakes in 1962. Moira's dam Madrilene, was closely related to Mincio, who won the Poule d'Essai des Poulains in 1960. Wertheimer sent the filly into training with Alec Head at Chantilly. She was ridden in all of her major races by her trainer's son Freddy Head. Dancing Maid shared a breeder, owner, trainer and sire with another leading French filly of the same generation, Reine de Saba.

== Racing career ==
=== 1977: two-year-old season ===
After finishing fourth over 1500 metres on her debut, Dancing Maid won a maiden race over 1700 metres at Longchamp Racecourse in October, beating Gayka by half a length.

=== 1978: three-year-old season ===
Dancing Maid began her three-year-old season in the Prix Vanteaux over 1900 metres at Longchamp on 16 April. Starting the 4.4/1 second favourite, she won by one and a half lengths from Reine Mere. The filly was then dropped back in distance for the Poule d'Essai des Pouliches over 1600m two weeks later and was made the 11/10 favourite against nine opponents. She led from the start and was never seriously challenged, winning by five lengths from Fruhlingstag with A Thousand Stars in third.

A month later, Dancing Maid was sent to England and moved up in distance for the 200th running of the Oaks Stakes over one and a half miles at Epsom Downs Racecourse. Starting favourite in a field of fifteen fillies she took the lead a quarter of a mile from the finish but was strongly challenged by Fair Salinia. In a very close finish, Dancing Maid was caught in the final stride and beaten a short head by the British filly. On 12 July, Dancing Maid was dropped in class and distance to contest the Prix Chloé over 1800 metres at Évry Racecourse. Accompanied by her pacemaker Vallee des Fleurs she started at odds of 3/10 and won by half a length from Tintagel.

On 17 September, Dancing Maid was made the 8/10 favourite for the Group One Prix Vermeille over 2400 metres at Longchamp, in which she was again matched against Fair Salinia. The field also included Calderina (Prix de Malleret), Tempus Fugit (Prix Penelope, Grand Prix de Vichy, Prix de la Nonette), A Thousand Stars and Relfo (Ribblesdale Stakes). Dancing Made tracked Fair Salinia, who set a strong pace but when the fillies turned into the straight Freddy Head found himself trapped on the inside rail with no room to make a challenge for the lead. Inside the final 200 metres a gap final appeared and Dancing Maid immediately accelerated, taking the lead in the final strides and winning by a length from Relfo with Amazer in third. Freddy Head elected to ride Dancing Maid in preference to the colt Gay Mecene when the filly started third favourite for the Prix de l'Arc de Triomphe over the same course and distance on 1 October. She produced a strong run in the straight without ever looking likely to win and finished third of the eighteen runners behind the four-year-olds Alleged and Trillion. Two weeks later, Dancing Maid was sent to England for a second time, but failed to reproduce her best form, finishing unplaced behind Swiss Maid in the Champion Stakes.

=== 1979: four-year-old season ===
Dancing Maid remained in training as a four-year-old but made only one appearance. On 29 April she started third favourite for the Prix Ganay over 2100 metres at Loncgchamp but finished sixth of the eight runners behind Frere Basile.

== Assessment ==
In 1977, the independent Timeform organisation awarded Dancing Maid a rating of 115, ten pounds below their top-rated two-year-old filly Cherry Hinton and described her as being "likely to make a very smart 3-y-o". A year later, she was given a Timeform rating of 126, making her the second-best three-year-old filly of 1978 behind Swiss Maid. In the official International Classification she was rated the third best filly of her generation behind Swiss Maid and the Prix de Diane winner Reine de Saba.

== Breeding record ==
Dancing Maid was retired from racing to become a broodmare, but only produced one foal. Her daughter Dancing Vaguely a bay filly, foaled in Kentucky in 1981 and sired by Vaguely Noble, was a stakes winner in France, winning the 1984 Prix Belle du Nuit. Dancing Maid died in 1982 and is buried in the equine cemetery at Hagyard Farm in Lexington.

== Pedigree ==
Pedigree of Dancing Maid, bay mare, 1975
| Sire Lyphard (USA) 1969 | Northern Dancer (CAN); 1961 | Nearctic | Nearco |
| Sire Lyphard (USA) 1969 | Northern Dancer (CAN); 1961 | Nearctic | Lady Angela |
| Sire Lyphard (USA) 1969 | Northern Dancer (CAN); 1961 | Natalma | Native Dancer |
| Sire Lyphard (USA) 1969 | Northern Dancer (CAN); 1961 | Natalma | Almahmoud |
| Sire Lyphard (USA) 1969 | Goofed (USA); 1960 | Court Martial | Fair Trial |
| Sire Lyphard (USA) 1969 | Goofed (USA); 1960 | Court Martial | Instantaneous |
| Sire Lyphard (USA) 1969 | Goofed (USA); 1960 | Barra | Formor |
| Sire Lyphard (USA) 1969 | Goofed (USA); 1960 | Barra | La Favorite |
| Dam Morana (FR) 1968 | Val de Loir (FR); 1959 | Vieux Manoir | Brantôme |
| Dam Morana (FR) 1968 | Val de Loir (FR); 1959 | Vieux Manoir | Vieille Maison |
| Dam Morana (FR) 1968 | Val de Loir (FR); 1959 | Vali | Sunny Boy |
| Dam Morana (FR) 1968 | Val de Loir (FR); 1959 | Vali | Her Slipper |
| Dam Morana (FR) 1968 | Moira (FR); 1959 | Sicambre | Prince Bio |
| Dam Morana (FR) 1968 | Moira (FR); 1959 | Sicambre | Sif |
| Dam Morana (FR) 1968 | Moira (FR); 1959 | Madrilene | Goya |
| Dam Morana (FR) 1968 | Moira (FR); 1959 | Madrilene | Miraflore (Family 14-b) |
