= Harbour (horse) =

French Thoroughbred racehorse

- Sire: Arctic Tern
- Grandsire: Sea-Bird
- Dam: Here's To You
- Damsire: Molvedo
- Sex: Mare
- Foaled: 21 May 1979
- Country: France
- Colour: Chestnut
- Breeder: Societe Aland
- Owner: Ecurie Aland
- Trainer: Criquette Head
- Record: 7:4-0-1

Major wins
- Prix Vanteaux (1982); Prix Saint-Alary (1982); Prix de Diane (1982)

Awards
- Timeform rating: 111 (1981), 129 (1982)

Harbour (1979–1985) was a French Thoroughbred racehorse. In the early part of 1982 she appeared to establish herself as the best of an exceptionally strong group of French three-year-old fillies by winning the Prix Vanteaux, Prix Saint-Alary and Prix de Diane and decisively defeating rivals including All Along and Akiyda. Her form was less impressive in the autumn and was retired after a disappointing run in the Prix de l'Arc de Triomphe.

== Background ==
Harbour was a "lightly-made" chestnut filly with a white blaze and four white socks bred and owned by the Head family's Ecurie Aland. She was from the first crop of foals sired by Arctic Tern, whose biggest win had been a victory over Exceller in the Prix Ganay. Arctic Tern went on to sire many other good winners including Bering and was the leading sire in France in 1986. Her dam Here's To You was a descendant of the American broodmare Warrior Lass, making her a distant relative of Bounding Home and Riva Ridge.

Harbour remained in the control of the Head family throughout her racing career, being trained at Chantilly by Criquette Head and ridden in all her major races by her trainer's brother Freddy.

== Racing career ==
=== 1981: two-year-old season ===
After finishing third on her racecourse debut, Harbour was entered in a maiden race over 1600 metres at Maisons-Laffitte in November. The filly drew clear of her ten opponents in the closing stages and won by four lengths from Kazatska. In their annual, Racehorses of 1981, the independent Timeform organisation described her as "the type to make a very useful middle-distance 3-y-o".

=== 1982: three-year-old season ===
Harbour began her three-year-old season in the Group Three Prix Vanteaux over 1900 m at Longchamp Racecourse in April. She recorded her first important win by beating Estere with Akiyda in third. Harbour was then moved up in class to contest the Group One Prix Saint-Alary over 2000 m at the same course on 23 May. Racing on heavy ground she started third favourite behind All Along and the Prix Marcel Boussac winner Play It Safe. Harbour won easily by four lengths from All Along, with Freddy Head never having to use his whip. The ground was heavy again on 13 June when Harbour was one of fourteen fillies to contest the Prix de Diane over 2100 m at Chantilly Racecourse. She was made 6/5 favourite, with her main opposition expected to come from River Lady, who had been an impressive winner of the Poule d'Essai des Poulains. She was in third place early in the straight when River Lady was pulled up after sustaining an injury which proved to be fatal. Harbour took the lead soon after and won easily by two lengths from Akiyda, with All Along in fifth place.

Harbour was rested after her win in the Prix de Diane and returned in autumn with the Prix de l'Arc de Triomphe as her principal objective. Her trial race for the Arc was the Prix Vermeille at Longchamp on 12 September. Racing on much firmer ground than she had previously encountered she ran a satisfactory race to finish a close fourth behind All Along, Akiyda and Grease. Her performance was particularly impressive as Freddy Head had struggled to obtain a clear run for the filly and she was closing on the leaders at the finish. On 3 October, racing on her favoured soft ground, Harbour started the 6.25/1 third favourite for the Arc behind the three-year-old colts Assert and Bon Sang. She became extremely agitated before the start and ran disappointingly, finishing ninth of the seventeen runners behind Akiyda.

== Assessment ==
Harbour was given a rating of 111 by Timeform in 1981, eleven pounds below their top-rated two-year-old filly Circus Ring. In the following season, Timeform's rating of 129 made Harbour their fourth best three-year-old filly behind Akiyda, Time Charter and Awaasif. In the official International Classification she was rated the second-best three-year-old filly (behind Akiyda) and the tenth-best horse of any age or sex in Europe.

== Stud career ==
Harbour was retired from racing after her run in the Arc and it was reported that she would be sent to the United States to be covered by the stallion Raja Baba. Harbour did not produce any foals that lived to maturity. She aborted the Raja Baba foal in 1984 after importation to the United States and died in 1985 after delivering a stillborn foal.

== Pedigree ==
Pedigree of Harbour, chestnut filly, 1979
Sire Arctic Tern (USA) 1973	Sea-Bird (FR); 1962	Dan Cupid	Native Dancer
Sire Arctic Tern (USA) 1973	Sea-Bird (FR); 1962	Dan Cupid	Vixenette
Sire Arctic Tern (USA) 1973	Sea-Bird (FR); 1962	Sicalade	Sicambre
Sire Arctic Tern (USA) 1973	Sea-Bird (FR); 1962	Sicalade	Marmelade
Sire Arctic Tern (USA) 1973	Bubbling Beauty (USA); 1961	Hasty Road	Roman
Sire Arctic Tern (USA) 1973	Bubbling Beauty (USA); 1961	Hasty Road	Traffic Court
Sire Arctic Tern (USA) 1973	Bubbling Beauty (USA); 1961	Almahmoud	Mahmoud
Sire Arctic Tern (USA) 1973	Bubbling Beauty (USA); 1961	Almahmoud	Arbitrator
Dam Here's To You (FR) 1970	Molvedo (ITY); 1958	Ribot	Tenerani
Dam Here's To You (FR) 1970	Molvedo (ITY); 1958	Ribot	Romanella
Dam Here's To You (FR) 1970	Molvedo (ITY); 1958	Maggiolina	Nakamuro
Dam Here's To You (FR) 1970	Molvedo (ITY); 1958	Maggiolina	Murcia
Dam Here's To You (FR) 1970	Naila (USA); 1960	Swaps	Khaled
Dam Here's To You (FR) 1970	Naila (USA); 1960	Swaps	Iron Reward
Dam Here's To You (FR) 1970	Naila (USA); 1960	Nasrina	Nasrullah
Dam Here's To You (FR) 1970	Naila (USA); 1960	Nasrina	Red Shoes (Family: 1-k)
