= Bruni (horse) =

Irish-bred Thoroughbred racehorse

- Sire: Sea Hawk
- Grandsire: Herbager
- Dam: Bombazine
- Damsire: Shantung
- Sex: Stallion
- Foaled: 3 May 1972
- Country: Ireland
- Colour: Grey
- Breeder: Barrettsown Castle Stud
- Owner: Charles St. George
- Trainer: Ryan Price
- Record: 21: 5–6-0

Major wins
- St. Leger Stakes (1975); Yorkshire Cup (1976); Cumberland Lodge Stakes (1976); Henry II Stakes (1977) (disqualified)

Awards
- Timeform 132

Bruni (3 May 1972 – after 1982), was an Irish-bred, British-trained Thoroughbred racehorse. In a career which lasted from 1974 until September 1977, he ran 21 times and won 5 races. He recorded his most important victory when winning the Classic St. Leger Stakes by ten lengths, one of the biggest margins in the race's 200-year history. The following season he became a difficult and temperamental performer, but was one of the leading middle distance horses in Europe, winning two Group races and finishing second in Britain's most prestigious all-aged race, the King George VI and Queen Elizabeth Stakes. He was retired to stud after an unsuccessful five-year-old season.

== Background ==
Bruni was a grey horse bred in County Kildare, Ireland by the Barretstown Castle Stud. As yearling he was sent to the Newmarket sales where he was bought for 7,800 guineas by the bloodstock agent J. T. Doyle on behalf of Charles St George. Unlike many grey thoroughbreds, Bruni was a very light colour from the start of his racing career. He was sired by the Grand Prix de Saint-Cloud winner Sea Hawk, from whom he inherited his colour, out of Bombazine, a mare who had finished fourth in The Oaks. St George sent the colt into training with Captain Ryan Price at Downs House, Findon, West Sussex.

== Racing career ==
=== 1974: two-year-old season ===
Bruni was very backward (immature) as a two-year-old. He made his only appearance of 1974 in a maiden race at Warwick Racecourse in which he finished unplaced.

=== 1975: three-year-old season ===
In April 1975, Bruni finished second in a maiden race oven one mile at Sandown Park and then won a similar event at Salisbury in early May. Bruni entered contention for the Epsom Derby when he was moved up in distance to 1 1/2 miles and finished second, beaten a short-head, to No Alimony in the Predominate Stakes at Goodwood. Bruni was already proving a quite difficult horse to train, and had to be exercised separately from Price's other horses.

Bruni's progress persuaded Lester Piggott to choose him as his ride in the Derby but he started an outsider at odds of 16/1 in a field of eighteen runners. Bruni lost his position when forced wide on the turn into the straight and finished fourteenth behind Grundy. He returned from the race slightly lame and soon afterwards contracted a viral infection which kept him off the racecourse for almost three months. He reappeared in the Friends of the Variety Club Stakes over ten furlongs at Sandown on 30 August and won by seven lengths in course record time.

Two weeks after his win at Sandown, Bruni was moved up in class and distance for the Classic St. Leger Stakes over 14 1/2 furlongs at Doncaster. Ridden by Tony Murray and starting at odds of 9/1, Bruni took the lead early in the straight and drew steadily clear of his opponents to win by ten lengths from King Pellinore and Libra's Rib. The win provoked celebrations in Findon, while bookmakers in the nearby town of Worthing reportedly had "one of their blackest days". At St George's insistence, Bruni ran again that autumn as he was sent to Paris to contest the Prix de l'Arc de Triomphe. He led briefly in the straight but faded in the closing stages to finish seventh to Star Appeal.

=== 1976: four-year-old season ===
There was a disagreement between Bruni's owner and trainer about his 1976 campaign: Price favoured the "Cup" races over extended distances, but St George insisted on running him in the major middle distance events. He began his season in the Yorkshire Cup at York Racecourse in May and won easily while carrying the "top weight" of 127 pounds, beating Mr Bigmore and Sea Anchor by two lengths.

After his poor performance in the previous year's Derby, Bruni bypassed the Coronation Cup at Epsom and was sent to Royal Ascot for the Hardwicke Stakes. In this race, Bruni showed the first public signs of temperamental problems as he appeared reluctant to race and fell back twelve lengths behind the leaders. He made up the lost ground and took the lead in the straight but was unable to hold off the renewed challenge of Orange Bay and was beaten a head. Bruni produced a similar performance when starting 6/1 second favourite for the King George VI and Queen Elizabeth Stakes over the same course and distance a month later. He was again left many lengths behind at the start and his problems were compounded when Piggot's foot slipped from the stirrup. By the final quarter-mile however he was back in contention and finished second, one length behind the French filly Pawneese, and a short head in front of Orange Bay.

At Ascot in September, Bruni returned in the Cumberland Lodge Stakes. Yet again, he was reluctant to race in the early stages and fell twelve lengths behind the rest of the runners. By the straight, however, he had made up the lost ground and took the lead before drawing clear to win by five lengths. As a result of this performance he was made second favourite for the Arc de Triomphe at Longchamp. He made progress to dispute the lead and looked a likely winner a furlong from the finish but was outpaced in the closing stages and finished fifth to Ivanjica. Following his run in the Arc, Bruni was sent to race in California.

=== 1977: five-year-old season ===
Bruni was unplaced in all of his three starts while in the United States, with his best effort being a fifth-place finish in the 1977 San Luis Rey Handicap at Santa Anita. Bruni's connections felt the horse "was not suited to the tight American circuits" and made the decision to return Bruni to Price's yard in April 1977 in preparation for the Ascot Gold Cup. As a five-year-old, Bruni was aimed at the major English staying races, but failed to recover his best form. On his debut he won the Henry II Stakes at Sandown by a head, but was disqualified and placed second for bumping the runner-up, Grey Baron.

Bruni contested the two and a half-mile Gold Cup at Royal Ascot, but made no impression in the straight and finished fourth to Sagaro, Buckskin and Citoyen. In July he was dropped in distance for a second attempt at the King George VI and Queen Elizabeth Stakes and finished seventh of the eleven runners behind The Minstrel and Orange Bay. Shortly afterwards, he returned to extended distances and was beaten by Grey Baron in the Goodwood Cup.

Bruni's final start was in the Doncaster Cup at the St Leger meeting. He appeared to be struggling from the start and pulled up lame in the straight.

== Stud career ==
In 1978, Bruni was initially retired to the Ashleigh Stud in Dublin. In 1980 he was relocated to the Hamilton Stud in Newmarket, where he stood until he was sold "to go abroad" for an undisclosed sum in December 1981. Bruni made no impact as a sire of winners. The best of his offspring was probably Brunico, who defeated Shardari in the 1986 Ormonde Stakes. His last recorded foals were born in 1982.

== Pedigree ==
Pedigree of Bruni (IRE), grey stallion, 1972
Sire Sea Hawk (FR) 1963	Herbager; 1956	Vandale	Plassy
Sire Sea Hawk (FR) 1963	Herbager; 1956	Vandale	Vanille
Sire Sea Hawk (FR) 1963	Herbager; 1956	Flagette	Escamillo
Sire Sea Hawk (FR) 1963	Herbager; 1956	Flagette	Fidgette
Sire Sea Hawk (FR) 1963	Sea Nymph; 1957	Free Man	Norseman
Sire Sea Hawk (FR) 1963	Sea Nymph; 1957	Free Man	Fantine*
Sire Sea Hawk (FR) 1963	Sea Nymph; 1957	Sea Spray	Ocean Swell
Sire Sea Hawk (FR) 1963	Sea Nymph; 1957	Sea Spray	Pontoon
Dam Bombazine (GB) 1963	Shantung; 1956	Sicambre	Prince Bio
Dam Bombazine (GB) 1963	Shantung; 1956	Sicambre	Sif*
Dam Bombazine (GB) 1963	Shantung; 1956	Barley Corn	Hyperion
Dam Bombazine (GB) 1963	Shantung; 1956	Barley Corn	Schiaparelli
Dam Bombazine (GB) 1963	Whimsical; 1958	Nearula	Nasrullah
Dam Bombazine (GB) 1963	Whimsical; 1958	Nearula	Respite
Dam Bombazine (GB) 1963	Whimsical; 1958	Whimbrel	The Phoenix
Dam Bombazine (GB) 1963	Whimsical; 1958	Whimbrel	Lindus (Family 22-a)

* Bruni is inbred 5S x 4D to the mare Sif, meaning that she appears fifth generation (via Fantine) on the sire side of his pedigree, and fourth generation on the dam side of his pedigree.
