= Vazira =

French-bred Thoroughbred racehorse

- Sire: Sea the Stars
- Grandsire: Cape Cross
- Dam: Vadaza
- Damsire: Zafonic
- Sex: Mare
- Foaled: 19 March 2011
- Country: France
- Colour: Bay
- Breeder: Aga Khan IV
- Owner: Aga Khan IV
- Trainer: Alain de Royer-Dupré
- Record: 6: 3-0-0
- Earnings: £179,669

Major wins
- Prix Vanteaux (2014); Prix Saint-Alary (2014)

Vazira (foaled 19 March 2011) is a British-bred, French-trained Thoroughbred racehorse and broodmare whose brief racing career consisted of six starts between 31 March and 4 October 2014. After winning a minor event on her debut she took the Prix Vanteaux and was then awarded the Prix Saint-Alary on the disqualification of We Are. She failed to win in three subsequent starts and was retired from racing at the end of the year.

== Background ==
Vazira is a bay mare with no white markings bred in France by her owner, Aga Khan IV. She was sent into training with Alain de Royer-Dupré in France and was ridden in all but one of her races by Christophe Soumillon.

She was from the first crop of foals sired by Sea the Stars who won the 2000 Guineas, Epsom Derby and Prix de l'Arc de Triomphe in 2009. His other major winners have included Harzand, Taghrooda, Stradivarius and Sea The Moon. Vazira's dam Vadaza showed good racing form, winning one race and being placed twice at Listed level before becoming a very successful broodmare whose other foals included Vadapolina (Prix de Psyché) and Vadawina (Prix Saint-Alary). She was a half-sister to Valixir and closely related to both Valyra and Val Royal.

== Racing career ==
=== 2014: three-year-old season ===
Vazira was unraced as a two-year-old and made her debut on 31 March 2014 in a maiden race over 1900 metres on the synthetic Polytrack surface at Saint-Cloud. Starting the 1.7/1 favourite she led the field into the straight and rallied after being overtaken in the last 200 metres to regain the advantage and win by half a length from Salawi. Less than a month after her maiden win, the filly was stepped up in class and started the 8/11 favourite for the Group 3 Prix Vanteaux over the same distance on very soft turf at Longchamp Racecourse. After racing in mid-division in the six-runner field she made progress in the straight and took the lead 200 metres out. Despite hanging right in the closing stages she kept on well under pressure to win by a short neck from the Jean-Claude Rouget-trained Kenzadargent with the pair finishing three lengths clear of Crisolles in third.

On 25 May Vazira was moved up in class and distance for the Prix Saint-Alary over 2000 metres at Longchamp and started the 5/4 favourite ahead of the unbeaten We Are. The best of the other five runners appeared to be Goldy Espony (Prix Penelope), Lady Penko (Prix Caravelle) and Stormyra (Prix La Camargo). She bucked exiting the starting stalls and raced at the rear of the field before beginning to make progress in the straight. Despite staying on well she never looked likely to win and was beaten three lengths into second place by We Are. The winner was subsequently disqualified after a post-race test revealed an "excessively high" level of testosterone in her sample and the race was awarded to Vazira.

In June Vazira was sent to England to contest the Ribblesdale Stakes over one and a half miles at Royal Ascot and headed the betting at odds of 9/4. After being restrained at the rear of the twelve-runner field she kept on well in the straight but never looked likely to win and came home fourth, one and three quarter lengths behind the winner Bracelet. After a break of two months the filly returned for the Prix de la Nonette over 2000 metres at Deauville in which she was ridden by Christophe Lemaire and finished fourth of the seven runners behind Avenir Certain. In October Vazira ended her career with a step up in distance to contest the 3000 metre Prix Chaudenay at Longchamp and started 3/1 favourite in a nine-runner field. After being reluctant to enter the stalls she was in contention for most of the way but faded badly in the straight to finish last.

== Breeding record ==
Vazira was retired from racing to become a broodmare for the Aga Khan's stud. Her foals include:

- Variyann, a colt, foaled in 2016, sired by Shamardal

== Pedigree ==
Pedigree of Vazira (FR), bay mare, 2011
Sire Sea the Stars (IRE) 2006	Cape Cross (IRE); 1994	Green Desert (USA)	Danzig
Sire Sea the Stars (IRE) 2006	Cape Cross (IRE); 1994	Green Desert (USA)	Foreign Courier
Sire Sea the Stars (IRE) 2006	Cape Cross (IRE); 1994	Park Appeal	Ahonoora (GB)
Sire Sea the Stars (IRE) 2006	Cape Cross (IRE); 1994	Park Appeal	Balidaress
Sire Sea the Stars (IRE) 2006	Urban Sea (USA); 1989	Miswaki	Mr. Prospector
Sire Sea the Stars (IRE) 2006	Urban Sea (USA); 1989	Miswaki	Hopespringseternal
Sire Sea the Stars (IRE) 2006	Urban Sea (USA); 1989	Allegretta (GB)	Lombard (GER)
Sire Sea the Stars (IRE) 2006	Urban Sea (USA); 1989	Allegretta (GB)	Anatevka (GER)
Dam Vadaza (FR) 1997	Zafonic (USA); 1990	Gone West	Mr. Prospector
Dam Vadaza (FR) 1997	Zafonic (USA); 1990	Gone West	Secrettame
Dam Vadaza (FR) 1997	Zafonic (USA); 1990	Zaizafon	The Minstrel (CAN)
Dam Vadaza (FR) 1997	Zafonic (USA); 1990	Zaizafon	Mofida (GB)
Dam Vadaza (FR) 1997	Vadlamixa; 1992	Linamix	Mendez
Dam Vadaza (FR) 1997	Vadlamixa; 1992	Linamix	Lunadix
Dam Vadaza (FR) 1997	Vadlamixa; 1992	Vadlava	Bikala (IRE)
Dam Vadaza (FR) 1997	Vadlamixa; 1992	Vadlava	Vadsa (USA) (Family 20-d)

- Vazira is inbred 4 × 4 to Mr. Prospector, meaning that this stallion appears twice in the fourth generation of her pedigree.
