= Above The Curve =

Irish-trained racehorse

- Sire: American Pharoah
- Grandsire: Pioneerof The Nile
- Dam: Fabulous
- Damsire: Galileo
- Sex: Filly
- Foaled: 22 April 2019
- Country: United States
- Color: Bay
- Breeder: Orpendale, Chelston & Wynatt
- Owner: Derrick Smith, Susan Magnier, Michael Tabor & Georg von Opel
- Trainer: Joseph Patrick O'Brien
- Record: 4: 2-1-1
- Earnings: £147,617

Major wins
- Prix Saint-Alary (2022)

Above The Curve (foaled 22 April 2019) is an American-bred, Irish-trained Thoroughbred racehorse. She finished third on her only start as a juvenile and after winning on her three-year-old debut she ran second in the Cheshire Oaks before winning the Group 1 Prix Saint-Alary.

== Background ==
Above The Curve is a bay filly with a white blaze and two white socks bred in Kentucky by Orpendale, Chelston & Wynatt, breeding companies associated with the Coolmore Stud. She was sent into training with Joseph Patrick O'Brien at Owning Hill, County Kilkenny and raced in the ownership of the Coolmore partners Derrick Smith, Michael Tabor and Susan Magnier in association with Georg von Opel.

She was from the third crop of foals sired by American Pharoah who won the American Triple Crown and the Breeders' Cup Classic in 2015. Above The Curve's dam Fabulous was an unraced half-sister to both Giant's Causeway and You'resothrilling (the dam of Gleneagles, Marvellous, Joan of Arc and Happily).

== Racing career ==
=== 2021: two-year-old season ===
Above The Curve began her track career in a maiden race over one mile on good ground on 16 October at Leopardstown Racecourse when she was ridden by Shane Crosse and started at odds of 18/1 in a fifteen-runner field. After overcoming a slow start she stayed on well in the closing stages to take third place, beaten three quarters of a length and half a length by Villanova Queen and Kerkiyra.

=== 2022: three-year-old season ===
On her first run as a three-year-old Above The Curve was again ridden by Crosse when she started 6/5 favourite for a maiden over ten furlongs at Leopardstown on 6 April and recorded her first success as she took the lead a furlong out and won "readily" by two and three quarter lengths from Thoughts of June (trained by Joseph Patrick O'Brien's father Aidan) despite hanging to the left in the closing stages. The filly was then sent to England and stepped up in class for the Listed Cheshire Oaks (a trial race for the Epsom Oaks) over one and a half miles at Chester Racecourse on 4 May. She started favourite but despite making steady progress over the last three furlongs she failed to catch her old rival Thoughts of June and was beaten a neck into second place. Although Above The Curve had been considered a contender for the Epsom Oaks O'Brien opted to bypass the race in favour of the Prix Saint-Alary.

At Longchamp Racecourse on 29 May Above The Curve, with Ryan Moore in the saddle, started the 1.4/1 favourite for the Group 1 Prix Saint-Alary over 2000 metres. Her five opponents included Place du Carrousel (winner of the Prix Cleopatre), Wild Beauty (Natalma Stakes) and Blue Wings (Prix Delahante). The filly was settled in second place behind Blue Wings before taking the lead 300 metres from the finish and was "driven out" by Moore to win by a length from Place du Carrousel. After the race Joseph O'Brien said "It's very satisfying. Group 1s are so difficult to win and it's very special. We thought this was probably her best opportunity to win one which is why we went there... The Diane or the Pretty Polly are probably the two most obvious options for her next start."

== Pedigree ==
Pedigree of Above The Curve (IRE), bay filly 2019
Sire American Pharoah (USA) 2012	Pioneerof The Nile (USA); 2006	Empire Maker	Unbridled
Sire American Pharoah (USA) 2012	Pioneerof The Nile (USA); 2006	Empire Maker	Toussaud
Sire American Pharoah (USA) 2012	Pioneerof The Nile (USA); 2006	Star of Goshen	Lord At War (ARG)
Sire American Pharoah (USA) 2012	Pioneerof The Nile (USA); 2006	Star of Goshen	Castle Eight
Sire American Pharoah (USA) 2012	Littleprincessemma (USA); 2006	Yankee Gentleman	Storm Cat
Sire American Pharoah (USA) 2012	Littleprincessemma (USA); 2006	Yankee Gentleman	Key Phrase
Sire American Pharoah (USA) 2012	Littleprincessemma (USA); 2006	Exclusive Rosette	Ecliptical
Sire American Pharoah (USA) 2012	Littleprincessemma (USA); 2006	Exclusive Rosette	Zetta Jet
Dam Fabulous (IRE) 2013	Galileo (IRE); 1998	Sadler's Wells (USA)	Northern Dancer (CAN)
Dam Fabulous (IRE) 2013	Galileo (IRE); 1998	Sadler's Wells (USA)	Fairy Bridge
Dam Fabulous (IRE) 2013	Galileo (IRE); 1998	Urban Sea (USA)	Miswaki
Dam Fabulous (IRE) 2013	Galileo (IRE); 1998	Urban Sea (USA)	Allegretta (GB)
Dam Fabulous (IRE) 2013	Mariah's Storm (USA); 1991	Rahy	Blushing Groom (FR)
Dam Fabulous (IRE) 2013	Mariah's Storm (USA); 1991	Rahy	Glorious Song (CAN)
Dam Fabulous (IRE) 2013	Mariah's Storm (USA); 1991	Immense	Roberto (IRE)
Dam Fabulous (IRE) 2013	Mariah's Storm (USA); 1991	Immense	Imsodear (Family: 11)
