= Henry Greer (politician) =

Irish politician (1855–1934)

Sir Henry Greer
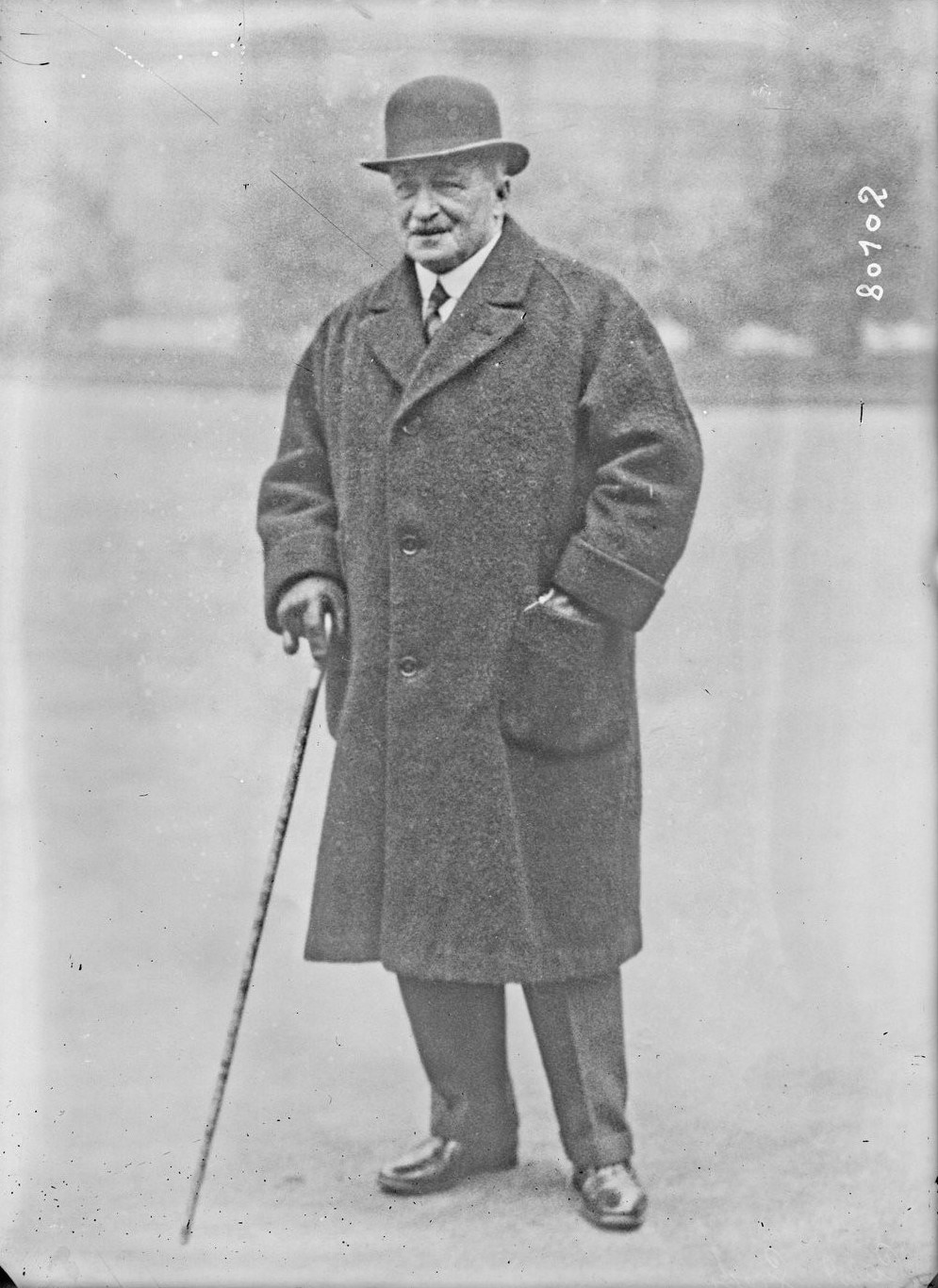
- Greer in 1922

Senator
- In office 11 December 1922 – 12 December 1928

Personal details
- Born: Joseph Henry Greer; 9 February 1855 County Tyrone, Ireland
- Died: 25 August 1934 (aged 79) County Kildare, Ireland
- Party: Independent
- Spouse: Olivia de la Poer Beresford (m. 1886)
- Children: 2

Sir Joseph Henry Greer KCVO (9 February 1855 – 25 August 1934) was an Irish soldier, politician, and racing horse owner and breeder. He was born in County Tyrone, was educated at Wellington and joined the 74th Highlanders after military college. He was appointed as Director of the Irish National Stud in 1915. He also became the Aga Khan III's first stud manager. He was appointed a Knight Commander of the Royal Victorian Order in the 1925 Birthday Honours.

He was an independent member of Seanad Éireann from 1922 to 1928. He was nominated to the Seanad by the President of the Executive Council in 1922 for 6 years. He did not contest the 1928 Seanad election.
