= Ryan Price (trainer) =

English horse trainer (1912–1986)

Personal information
- Born: 16 August 1912 Hindhead, Surrey, United Kingdom
- Died: 16 August 1986 (aged 74)
- Occupation: Trainer

Horse racing career
- Sport: Horse racing
- Career wins: 2,000+

Major racing wins
- National Hunt race wins: Champion Hurdle (1955, 1959, 1961); Whitbread Gold Cup (1959, 1966); Grand National (1962); Mackeson Gold Cup (1967); Champion Novices' Chase (1967); Cheltenham Gold Cup (1969); Schweppes Gold Trophy (1963, 1964, 1966, 1967); Gloucestershire Hurdle (1971); Triumph Hurdle (1962,1973) Flat race wins: Cesarewitch Handicap (1966); Yorkshire Cup (1976) British Classic Flat Race wins: Epsom Oaks (1972); St. Leger Stakes (1975)

Racing awards
- British jump racing Champion Trainer (1955, 1959, 1962, 1966, 1967)

Significant horses
- Persian Lancer, Kilmore; What a Myth, Ginevra, Bruni, M-Lolshan
- Updated on 13 August 2007

Henry Ryan Price (16 August 1912 – 16 August 1986) was a British Thoroughbred horse trainer in both flat and National Hunt racing.

Born in Hindhead, Surrey, he was best known by his middle name, Ryan. He began his career in horse racing as a jockey based at East Lavant in West Sussex. In 1937, he relocated to Sutton Bank in Yorkshire where he began working as a trainer. His career was interrupted by service with the British Army, during World War II. Serving with the 7th Battalion of the North Staffordshire Regiment, he was moved to the No. 6 Commando for D-Day. During the 6 June 1944 landing, his Craft LCI(S) No.502 was hit by German shelling as it approached the Normandy beach but he managed to swim to shore and continued with the mission.

Discharged with the rank of captain, he resumed his Thoroughbred racing career and eventually settled in Findon, West Sussex where he operated at Downs House, Stable Lane.

== National Hunt Champion Trainer ==
Between 1954 and 1967, Ryan Price was the Champion National Hunt trainer five times. Among his other wins, Price trained the winner of the 1955, 1959, and 1961 Champion Hurdle, the 1959 and 1966 Whitbread Gold Cup, the 1967 Mackeson Gold Cup and Champion Novices' Chase, the 1971 Supreme Novices' Hurdle, and the 1962 & 1973 Triumph Hurdle.

In 1962, he earned the most important win of his career when Kilmore won the Grand National at Aintree Racecourse. The following year the Schweppes Gold Trophy Handicap Hurdle was inaugurated at Newbury Racecourse. Ryan Price won four of the first five runnings with horses ridden for him by Josh Gifford. The duo won the race back-to-back with Rosyth in 1963 and 1964, with Le Vermontois in 1966 and controversially with Hill House in 1967, and in 1969 he added to his major race wins when What a Myth captured the Cheltenham Gold Cup.

An owner as well as a trainer, Ryan Price was among the first British trainers to purchase young jumpers from France.

== Flat racing ==
In 1966, Ryan Price's horse Persian Lancer, won the 1966 Cesarewitch Handicap and after moving to Findon's facilities at Soldiers Field in early 1970, Price concentrated primarily on the Flat although still having hurdlers in training. For owner Charles A. B. St. George, he won the 1972 Epsom Oaks with Ginevra and the 1975 St. Leger Stakes with Bruni. The following year, Bruni won the Yorkshire Cup and the Cumberland Lodge Stakes and finished second to the French champion filly Pawneese in the Group One King George VI and Queen Elizabeth Stakes.

Plagued by health problems, Ryan Price gave up training in 1982 but remained involved in racing as an owner. Following emergency surgery, he died on his seventy-fourth birthday at Royal Sussex County Hospital in Brighton. He was interred in the St. John the Baptist Church cemetery in Findon.
