= Prix Vanteaux =

Flat horse race in France

- Class: Group 3
- Location: Longchamp Racecourse; Paris, France
- Inaugurated: 1868
- Race type: Flat / Thoroughbred
- Website: france-galop.com

Race information
- Distance: 1,850 metres (1m 1¼f)
- Surface: Turf
- Track: Right-handed
- Qualification: Three-year-old fillies
- Weight: 57 kg
- Purse: €80,000 (2022); 1st: €40,000

Prix Vanteaux
2025
Mandanaba	Flaming Stone	Gezora

Previous years
2024
Dare To Dream	Almara	Survie
2023
Jannah Rose	Sea The Lady	Around Midnight
2022
Mqse De Sevigne	Know Thyself	Hot Queen
2021
Rumi	Petricor	Omnia Munda Mundis

2020-2011
2020
Magic Attitude	Emoji	Flighty Lady
2018
Barkaa	Soustraction	Princesschope
2017
Gold Luck	Monroe Bay	Hebah
2016
Zghorta Dance	Azaelia	Dourdana
2015
Olorda	Vedouma	Via Manzoni
2014
Vazira	Kenzadargent	Crisolles
2013
Esoterique	Silasol	Pearlside
2012
Trois Lunes	Sagawara	Prima Noa
2011
Epic Love	La Pernelle	Starformer

2010-2001
2010
Zagora	On Verra	Gold Harvest
2009
Denomination	Celebra	Tassara
2008
Belle Allure	Wait And See	Proviso
2007
Just Little	Elva	Party Girl
2006
Danzon	Sirene Doloise	High Heel Sneakers
2005
Satwa Queen	Naissance Royale	Fading Light
2004
Latice	Asti	Green Swallow
2003
Campsie Fells	Mystic Melody	Liska
2002
Ana Marie	Bright Sky	Mariensky
2001
Mare Nostrum	Snataka	Alta Lena

2000-1990
2000
America	Hidalguia	Beyond The Waves
1999
Star Of Akkar	Hello Soso	All Glory
1998
Zainta	Deskaheh	Saralea
1997
Queen Maud	Tashiriya	Palacoona
1996
Luna Wells	Ecoute	Wedding Gift
1995
Secret Quest	Marble Falls	Nimble Mind
1994
Bonash	My Trim	Mrs Arkada
1993
Corrazona	Accommodating	Broken Peace
1992
Sheba Dancer	Symphorine	Renashaan
1991
Masslama	Treble	Gravieres
1990
Qirmazi	Guiza	Ivor Jewel

The Prix Vanteaux is a Group 3 flat horse race in France open to three-year-old thoroughbred fillies. It is run over a distance of 1,850 metres (about 1 mile and 1¼ furlongs) at Longchamp in April or early May.

== History ==
The event is named after the Vanteaux family, who were among France's first racehorse breeders. The family were based at the Saint-Jean-Ligoure stud farm in Haute-Vienne. The farm was initially run by Gabriel de Vanteaux (1779–1854), and then by his son Psalmet de Vanteaux (1822–1893).

The Prix Vanteaux was established in 1868, and it was originally run over 2,000 metres. It was abandoned because of the Franco-Prussian War in 1871. It was cancelled throughout World War I, with no running from 1915 to 1918.

The race was held at Maisons-Laffitte in 1944 and 1945. It was shortened to 1,950 metres in 1953. During the mid-1960s, it was contested over 1,850 metres (1963), 1,950 metres (1964) and 1,850 metres (1965–67). It was extended to 1,900 metres in 1968.

The present system of race grading was introduced in 1971, and the Prix Vanteaux was subsequently classed at Group 3 level. It was cut to 1,850 metres in 1987.

The event sometimes serves as a trial for the Prix de Diane. The last horse to win both races was Latice in 2004.

== Records ==
Leading jockey (5 wins):

- R. Hunter – Regane (1872), Mondaine (1876), Linotte (1878), Willye (1882), Liria (1884)
- Charles Bouillon – Coriandre (1928), Vareuse (1933), Reine Isaure (1934), Asheratt (1938), Bulle de Savon (1939)

Leading trainer (7 wins):

- Criquette Head-Maarek – Three Troikas (1979), Harbour (1982), Fitnah (1985), Riviere d'Or (1988), Corrazona (1993), America (2000), Denomination (2009)
- André Fabre - Grise Mine (1984), Louveterie (1989), Qirmazi (1990), Bonash (1994), Luna Wells (1996), Esoterique (2013), Mqse De Sevigne (2022)

Leading owner (7 wins):

- Édouard de Rothschild – Floraison (1912), Honeysuckle (1922), Coriandre (1928), Vareuse (1933), Reine Isaure (1934), Asheratt (1938), Bulle de Savon (1939)

== Winners since 1978 ==
Year	Winner	Jockey	Trainer	Owner	Time
1978	Dancing Maid	Freddy Head	Alec Head	Jacques Wertheimerau	2:09.80
1979	Three Troikas	Freddy Head	John Cunnington Jr.	Ghislaine Head	2:03.80
1980	Luth de Saron	Maurice Philipperon	John Cunnington Jr.	Paul de Moussac	2:03.70
1981	Bernica	Philippe Paquet	François Boutin	Stavros Niarchos
1982	Harbour	Freddy Head	Criquette Head	Ecurie Aland
1983	Escaline	Maurice Philipperon	John Fellows	Mrs John Fellows
1984	Grise Mine	Yves Saint-Martin	André Fabre	Guy de Rothschild
1985	Fitnah	Guy Guignard	Criquette Head	Maktoum Al Maktoum
1986	Barger	Gérald Mossé	Patrick Biancone	Nelson Bunker Hunt
1987	Miroswava	Jorge Velásquez	Georges Mikhalidès	Mahmoud Fustok
1988	Riviere d'Or	Gary W. Moore	Criquette Head	Jacques Wertheimer	2:00.40
1989	Louveterie	Cash Asmussen	André Fabre	Daniel Wildenstein	2:03.80
1990	Qirmazi	Cash Asmussen	André Fabre	Sheikh Mohammed	2:03.10
1991	Masslama	William Mongil	Alain de Royer-Dupré	HH Aga Khan IV	1:57.30
1992	Sheba Dancer	Dominique Boeuf	Élie Lellouche	Joseph Sebag	1:55.70
1993	Corrazona	Olivier Doleuze	Criquette Head	Jacques Wertheimer	2:05.80
1994	Bonash	Olivier Peslier	André Fabre	Khalid Abdullah	1:58.00
1995	Secret Quest	Dominique Boeuf	Pascal Bary	Lady O'Reilly	2:07.70
1996	Luna Wells	Thierry Jarnet	André Fabre	Jean-Luc Lagardère	1:56.00
1997	Queen Maud	Cash Asmussen	Jean de Roualle	Knut Eng	2:01.00
1998	Zainta	Gérald Mossé	Alain de Royer-Dupré	HH Aga Khan IV	2:08.60
1999	Star of Akkar	Thierry Gillet	Jean-Claude Rouget	Marquesa de Moratalla	1:55.80
2000	America	Olivier Doleuze	Criquette Head	Wertheimer et Frère	2:10.00
2001	Mare Nostrum	Thierry Jarnet	Pascal Bary	Niarchos Family	2:01.40
2002	Ana Marie	Davy Bonilla	Philippe Demercastel	Ecurie Bader	1:53.00
2003	Campsie Fells	Thierry Jarnet	Henri-Alex Pantall	Sheikh Mohammed	2:02.60
2004	Latice	Christophe Soumillon	Jean-Marie Béguigné	Enrico Ciampi	2:01.30
2005	Satwa Queen	Frédéric Spanu	Jean de Roualle	Steven & Gillian Lamprell	1:56.90
2006	Danzon	Ioritz Mendizabal	Jean-Claude Rouget	Joseph Allen	1:59.20
2007	Just Little	Christophe Lemaire	Jean-Claude Rouget	Gann / Thompson	1:54.00
2008	Belle Allure	Davy Bonilla	Rupert Pritchard-Gordon	Ronchalon Racing Ltd	1:54.30
2009	Denomination	Dominique Boeuf	Criquette Head-Maarek	Ghislaine Head	1:55.39
2010	Zagora	Christophe Soumillon	Jean-Claude Rouget	Martin Schwartz	1:55.50
2011	Epic Love	Stéphane Pasquier	Pascal Bary	James Treptow	1:56.11
2012	Trois Lunes	François-Xavier Bertras	François Rohaut	Haras de Saint Pair	2:01.80
2013	Esoterique	Maxime Guyon	André Fabre	Édouard de Rothschild	1:53.72
2014	Vazira	Christophe Soumillon	Alain de Royer-Dupré	Aga Khan IV	1:58.91
2015	Olorda	Cristian Demuro	Michael Figge	Peter Harald Sander	2:02.61
2016	Zghorta Dance (Note: The 2016 and 2017 runnings took place at Chantilly Racecourse over 1800m while Longchamp was closed for redevelopment)	Ioritz Mendizabal	Jean-Claude Rouget	Ecurie I M Fares	1:57.46
2017	Gold Luck	Maxime Guyon	Freddy Head	Wertheimer et Frère	1:50.21
2018	Barkaa	Cristian Demuro	Fabrice Vermeulen	Augustin-Normand & Bruneau de la Salle	2:01.28
2019	Platane	Maxime Guyon	Carlos Laffon-Parias	Wertheimer et Frère	1:51.69
2020	Magic Attitude	Tony Piccone	Fabrice Chappet	Haras du Saubouas	1:53.22
2021	Rumi	Olivier Peslier	Carlos Laffon-Parias	Al Shira'aa Farms	2:01.43
2022	Mqse De Sevigne	Hugo Besnier	André Fabre	Édouard de Rothschild	1:54.09
2023	Jannah Rose	Christophe Soumillon	Carlos Laffon-Parais	Al Shira'aa Farms	1:49.74
2024	Dare To Dream	Alexis Pouchin	Gavin Hernon	Dun Shing Lee	2:00.58
2025	Mandanaba	Mickael Barzalona	Francis-Henri Graffard	Zahra Aga Khan	1:49.89
2026	Concorde Agreement	Clement Lecoeuvre	Pierre Groualle	Baccari Racing Stable LLC	1:52.09

== Earlier winners ==
- 1868: Mousie
- 1869: L'Oise
- 1870: Sornette
- 1871: no race
- 1872: Regane
- 1873: Spada
- 1874: Poudriere
- 1875: Confiance
- 1876: Mondaine
- 1877: Astree
- 1878: Linotte
- 1879: Venise
- 1880: Voilette
- 1881: Belgirate
- 1882: Willye
- 1883: Bichette
- 1884: Liria
- 1885: Bulgarie
- 1886: Babel
- 1887: Hervine
- 1888: Verveine
- 1889: Chopine
- 1890: Liliane
- 1891: Clarisse
- 1892: Fantasia
- 1893: Barbara
- 1894: Floride
- 1895: Picardia
- 1896: Perouse
- 1897: His First
- 1898: Fee Printemps
- 1899: Hasseki
- 1900: Thebes
- 1901: Rosine
- 1902: Basse Terre
- 1903: Senorita
- 1904: Feuille de Chou
- 1905: Ginette
- 1906: Bethsaida
- 1907: Franchise
- 1908: Medeah
- 1909: Loris
- 1910: M'Amour
- 1911: Tripolette
- 1912: Floraison
- 1913: Babette
- 1914: Bobine
- 1915–18: no race
- 1919: Suavita
- 1920: Meddlesome Maid
- 1921: Durban
- 1922: Honeysuckle
- 1923: Royal Mistress
- 1924: Isola Bella
- 1925: Frisette
- 1926: Rayon de Soleil
- 1927: Lithography
- 1928: Coriandre
- 1929: Rollybuchy
- 1930: Finsovino
- 1931: Melianthe
- 1932: Kiddie
- 1933: Vareuse
- 1934: Reine Isaure
- 1935: Farfadette
- 1936: Nymph
- 1937: Nica
- 1938: Asheratt
- 1939: Bulle de Savon
- 1940: Novalaise *
- 1941: Longthanh
- 1942: Infante
- 1943: Bisbille
- 1944: Palencia
- 1945: Piva
- 1946: Ephese
- 1947: La Gerbe
- 1948: Bettina
- 1949: Double Rose
- 1950: Camarée
- 1951: Nadika
- 1952: Parade d'Amour
- 1953: Kypris
- 1954: Haridelle
- 1955: All Risk
- 1956: Tour de Londres
- 1957: Avilon
- 1958: But Lovely
- 1959: Favreale
- 1960: Toscanella
- 1961: Belle Shika
- 1962: Gaspesie
- 1963: Altissima
- 1964: Dreida
- 1965: La Sarre
- 1966: Fermina
- 1967: Casaque Grise
- 1968: La Lagune
- 1969: Fast Ride
- 1970: Bon Appetit
- 1971: Flamboyante
- 1972: Dame des Ondes
- 1973: Reine de Naples
- 1974: Lady Rebecca
- 1975: Sea Sands
- 1976: Theia
- 1977: Dekeleia

* Nuit de Noce finished first in 1940, but she was relegated to second place following a stewards' inquiry.

== See also ==
- List of French flat horse races
