= Camaree =

French-bred Thoroughbred racehorse

- Sire: Maurepas
- Grandsire: Aethelstan
- Dam: Couleur
- Damsire: Biribi
- Sex: Mare
- Foaled: 1947
- Country: France
- Colour: Grey
- Breeder: Jean Ternynck
- Owner: Jean Ternynck
- Trainer: Alexandre Lieux
- Record: 6: 4-1-0 (incomplete)

Major wins
- Prix Vanteaux (1950); 1000 Guineas (1950)

Camaree (1947 – after 1958) was a French Thoroughbred racehorse and broodmare. She showed promise as a juvenile when she won twice and finished second in the Prix Thomas Bryon. She reached her peak in the following spring when she took the Prix Vanteaux and was then sent to England where she recorded her biggest victory in the 1000 Guineas. She ran unplaced when favourite for the Epsom Oaks and was retired from racing. She had little success as a broodmare.

== Background ==
Camaree was a grey mare bred and owned by Jean Ternynck. As a young horse her grey colouring was not apparent and during her racing career she was officially described as brown. She was trained in France by Alexandre Lieux.

She was sired by Maurepas, a top-class racehorse whose wins included the Grand Prix de Paris, Prix du Cadran and Grand Prix de Saint-Cloud. As a breeding stallion, the best of his other foals included Burgos who won the (Grand Prix de Saint-Cloud) and Grand Prix d'Automne. Her dam, Couleur was a winner over hurdles and later produced Camaree's full-sister Marmelade, the grand-dam of Sea-Bird.

== Racing career ==
=== 1949: two-year-old season ===
As a two-year-old Camaree produced her best effort when finishing second to the colt Fort Napoleon in the Prix Thomas Bryon over 1500 metres at Saint-Cloud Racecourse in November. She had previously won two minor races but ended the season ranked about eighteen pounds behind the top juveniles in France.

=== 1950: three-year-old season ===
Camaree began her second season in the Prix Vanteaux at Longchamp Racecourse in April and won despite her jockey, Rae Johnstone, being hampered by a slipping saddle. At Johnstone's urging, the filly was then sent to England to contest the 137th running of the 1000 Guineas over the Rowley Mile at Newmarket Racecourse on 28 April. The July Stakes winner Diableretta started favourite ahead of Stella Polaris (Cornwallis Stakes) with Camaree next in the betting on 10/1. With Johnstone in the saddle she came home three lengths clear of Catchit and Tambara, who dead-heated for second place. Her winning time of 1:37.0 was a new record for the race.

As Rae Johnstone chose to ride another French filly, Asmena, Gordon Richards took the ride when Camaree was stepped up distance and started favourite for the Oaks Stakes over one and a half miles at Epsom Racecourse on 25 May. Camaree took the lead three furlongs out but faded in the closing stages and finished unplaced behind Asmena.

== Assessment and honours ==
In their book, A Century of Champions, based on the Timeform rating system, John Randall and Tony Morris rated Camaree an "average" winner of the 1000 Guineas.

== Breeding record ==
After her retirement from racing, Camaree became a broodmare for her owner's stud. She produced at least two foals, neither of whom made any significant impact:

- Mea Culpa, a grey filly, foaled in 1954, sired by Bozzetto
- Peticama, grey filly, 1958, by Petition

== Pedigree ==
Pedigree of Camaree (FR), grey mare, 1947
Sire Maurepas (FR) 1937	Aethelstan; 1922	Teddy	Ajax
Sire Maurepas (FR) 1937	Aethelstan; 1922	Teddy	Rondeau (GB)
Sire Maurepas (FR) 1937	Aethelstan; 1922	Dedicace	Val Suzon
Sire Maurepas (FR) 1937	Aethelstan; 1922	Dedicace	Disadvantage (USA)
Sire Maurepas (FR) 1937	Broceliande; 1925	La Farina	Sans Souci
Sire Maurepas (FR) 1937	Broceliande; 1925	La Farina	Malatesta (GB)
Sire Maurepas (FR) 1937	Broceliande; 1925	Reine Mab	Rabelais (GB)
Sire Maurepas (FR) 1937	Broceliande; 1925	Reine Mab	Justitia
Dam Couleur (FR) 1939	Biribi; 1923	Rabelais (GB)	St Simon
Dam Couleur (FR) 1939	Biribi; 1923	Rabelais (GB)	Satirical
Dam Couleur (FR) 1939	Biribi; 1923	La Bidouze	Chouberski
Dam Couleur (FR) 1939	Biribi; 1923	La Bidouze	La Bidassoa
Dam Couleur (FR) 1939	Colour Bar (GB); 1930	Colorado	Phalaris
Dam Couleur (FR) 1939	Colour Bar (GB); 1930	Colorado	Canyon
Dam Couleur (FR) 1939	Colour Bar (GB); 1930	Lady Disdain	Hurry On
Dam Couleur (FR) 1939	Colour Bar (GB); 1930	Lady Disdain	Lady Phoebe (Family 2-n)

- Camaree was inbred 3 × 4 to Rabelais, meaning this stallion appears in both the third and fourth generations of her pedigree.
