= Prix Saint-Alary =

Flat horse race in France

- Class: Group 2
- Location: Longchamp Racecourse; Paris, France
- Inaugurated: 1960
- Race type: Flat / Thoroughbred
- Sponsor: Coolmore Stud
- Website: france-galop.com

Race information
- Distance: 2,000 metres (1¼ miles)
- Surface: Turf
- Track: Right-handed
- Qualification: Three-year-old fillies
- Weight: 57 kg
- Purse: €250,000 (2022); 1st: €142,850

Prix Saint-Alary
2026
	[[ | Sea blue body and cap with white band on the sleeves | 92px]]
Lapotheose	Concorde Agreement	Evita

Previous years
2025
Gezora	Audubon Park	Flaming Stone
2024
Birthe	Almara	Survie
2023
Jannah Rose	Elusive Princess	Crown Princesse
2022
Above The Curve	Place Du Carrousel	Queen Trezy
2021
Incarville	Cirona	Es La Vida

2020-2011
2020
Tawkeel	Magic Attitude	Solsticia
2019
Siyarafina	Olendon	Imperial Charm
2018
Laurens	With You	Soustraction
2017
Sobetsu	Vue Fantastique	Coronet
2016
Jemayel	Camprock	Hawksmoor
2015
Queen's Jewel	Wekeela	Olorda
2014
Vazira	Bereni Ka	Lady Penko
2013
Silasol	Alterite	Ferevia
2012
Sagawara	Rjwa	Forces Of Darkness
2011
Wavering	Epic Love	Nonsuch Way

2010–2001
2010
Sarafina	Deluxe	Hibaayeb
2009
Stacelita	Article Rare	Ana Americana
2008
Belle Et Celebre	Gagnoa	Proviso
2007
Coquerelle	Believe Me	Anabaa's Creation
2006
Germance	Sanaya	Alix Road
2005
Vadawina	Argentina	Perfect Hedge
2004
Ask For The Moon	Asti	Agata
2003
Fidelite	Hi Dubai	Arvada
2002
Marotta	Bright Sky	Summertime Legacy
2001
Nadia	Mare Nostrum	Choc Ice

2000–1991
2000
Reve D'Oscar	Folie Danse	Hidalguia
1999
Cerulean Sky	Juvenia	Visionnaire
1998
Zainta	Loving Claim	Good Enough
1997
Brilliance	Fleeting Glimpse	Gazelle Royale
1996
Luna Wells	Miss Tahiti	Ecoute
1995
Muncie	Marble Falls	Secret Quest
1994
Moonlight Dance	Three Angels	Mrs Arkada
1993
Intrepidity	Dancienne	Accommodating
1992
Rosefinch	Jolypha	Verveine
1991
Treble	Polemic	Louve Romaine

1990-1988
1990
Air De Rien	Louve Bleue	Qirmazi
1989
Behera	Louveterie	Lady in Silver
1988
Rivière d'Or	Norland	Resless Kara

The Prix Saint-Alary is a Group 2 flat horse race in France open to three-year-old thoroughbred fillies. It is run at Longchamp in Paris over a distance of 2,000 metres (about 1 1/4 miles), and takes place each year in May.

== History ==
The event is named after Evremond de Saint-Alary (1868–1941), a successful racehorse owner and breeder. It was established in 1960, and was originally contested on Longchamp's middle course (moyenne piste). It was switched to the main course (grande piste) in 1987.

The Prix Saint-Alary serves as a trial for the following month's Prix de Diane. Thirteen fillies have won both races. The first was La Sega in 1962, and the most recent was Gezora in 2025.

In 2024 the race was downgraded to Group Two status by the European Pattern Committee.

== Records ==
Leading jockey (9 wins):

- Freddy Head – Tidra (1967), Pistol Packer (1971), Riverqueen (1976), Reine de Saba (1978), Three Troikas (1979), Harbour (1982), Fitnah (1985), Lacovia (1986), Treble (1991)

Leading trainer (8 wins):

- André Fabre – Grise Mine (1984), Rosefinch (1992), Intrepidity (1993), Moonlight Dance (1994), Muncie (1995), Luna Wells (1996), Vadawina (2005), Wavering (2011)

Leading owner (8 wins):

- HH Aga Khan IV – Cervinia (1963), Behera (1989), Zainta (1998), Vadawina (2005), Sarafina (2010), Sagawara (2012), Vazira (2014), Siyarafina (2019)

== Winners since 1971 ==
Year	Winner	Jockey	Trainer	Owner	Time
1971	Pistol Packer	Freddie Head	Alec Head	Ghislaine Head	2:16.40
1972	Prodice	Alfred Gibert	Domingo Perea	Mme A. Bollack	2:13.20
1973	Dahlia	Bill Pyers	Maurice Zilber	Nelson Bunker Hunt	2:10.40
1974	Comtesse de Loir	Jean-Claude Desaint	John Cunnington	George Ohrstrom	2:05.40
1975	Nobiliary	Lester Piggott	Maurice Zilber	Nelson Bunker Hunt	2:08.20
1976	Riverqueen	Freddie Head	Alec Head	Christian Datessen	2:07.10
1977	Madelia	Yves Saint-Martin	Angel Penna, Sr.	Daniel Wildenstein	2:10.70
1978	Reine de Saba	Freddy Head	Alec Head	Jacques Wertheimer	2:12.10
1979	Three Troikas	Freddy Head	Criquette Head	Ghislaine Head	2:04.90
1980	Paranete	Alfred Gibert	Mitri Saliba	Mahmoud Fustok	2:04.80
1981	Tootens	Georges Doleuze	Edouard Bartholomew	Cora Lynch	2:15.10
1982	Harbour	Freddy Head	Criquette Head	Ecurie Åland	2:20.10
1983	Smuggly	Alain Badel	Olivier Douieb	Edward Seltzer	2:19.70
1984	Grise Mine	Yves Saint-Martin	André Fabre	Guy de Rothschild	2:12.20
1985	Fitnah	Freddy Head	Criquette Head	Miss H. Al Maktoum	2:04.70
1986	Lacovia	Freddy Head	François Boutin	Gerry Oldham	2:06.70
1987	Indian Skimmer	Steve Cauthen	Henry Cecil	Sheikh Mohammed	2:10.10
1988	Riviere d'Or	Gary W. Moore	Criquette Head	Jacques Wertheimer	2:05.20
1989	Behera	Alain Lequeux	Alain de Royer-Dupré	Aga Khan IV	2:02.10
1990	Air de Rien	Alain Badel	Myriam Bollack-Badel	Jacques Berès	2:04.00
1991	Treble	Freddy Head	Criquette Head	Edward Stephenson	2:08.40
1992	Rosefinch	Steve Cauthen	André Fabre	Sheikh Mohammed	2:05.00
1993	Intrepidity	Thierry Jarnet	André Fabre	Sheikh Mohammed	2:04.80
1994	Moonlight Dance	Thierry Jarnet	André Fabre	Daniel Wildenstein	2:08.30
1995	Muncie	Olivier Peslier	André Fabre	Daniel Wildenstein	2:08.70
1996	Luna Wells	Thierry Jarnet	André Fabre	Jean-Luc Lagardère	2:13.60
1997	Brilliance	Olivier Peslier	Pascal Bary	Ecurie Skymarc Farm	2:09.10
1998	Zainta	Gérald Mossé	Alain de Royer-Dupré	Aga Khan IV	2:03.20
1999	Cerulean Sky	Sylvain Guillot	Robert Collet	Richard Strauss	2:06.30
2000	Reve d'Oscar	Alain Badel	Myriam Bollack-Badel	Mrs Guy de Châtelperron	2:08.00
2001	Nadia	Dominique Boeuf	Carlos Laffon-Parias	Maktoum Al Maktoum	2:08.60
2002	Marotta	Thierry Jarnet	Richard Gibson	Antoinette Oppenheimer	2:03.00
2003	Fidelite	Olivier Peslier	Criquette Head-Maarek	Wertheimer et Frère	2:06.30
2004	Ask for the Moon	Ioritz Mendizabal	Jean-Claude Rouget	Jean-Pierre Dubois	2:05.10
2005	Vadawina	Christophe Soumillon	André Fabre	Aga Khan IV	2:02.80
2006	Germance	Ioritz Mendizabal	Jean-Claude Rouget	Nelson Radwan	2:05.10
2007	Coquerelle	Christophe Lemaire	Jean-Claude Rouget	Ecurie des Monceaux	2:11.10
2008	Belle et Celebre	Christophe Lemaire	Alain de Royer-Dupré	Aliette Forien	2:10.00
2009	Stacelita	Christophe Lemaire	Jean-Claude Rouget	Ecurie Monastic	2:10.66
2010	Sarafina	Gérald Mossé	Alain de Royer-Dupré	Aga Khan IV	2:04.10
2011	Wavering	Mickael Barzalona	André Fabre	Godolphin	2:05.80
2012	Sagawara	Christophe Lemaire	Alain de Royer-Dupré	Aga Khan IV	2:04.37
2013	Silasol	Olivier Peslier	Carlos Laffon-Parias	Wertheimer et Frère	2:10.53
2014	Vazira (Note: We Are finished first in 2014 but was later disqualified after testing positive for a banned substance, caused by illness.)	Christophe Soumillon	Alain de Royer-Dupré	Aga Khan IV	2:08.45
2015	Queen's Jewel	Maxime Guyon	Freddy Head	Wertheimer et Frère	2:00.87
2016	Jemayel (Note: The 2016 and 2017 runnings took place at Deauville while Longchamp was closed for redevelopment)	Grégory Benoist	Jean-Claude Rouget	Al Shaqab Racing	2:07.93
2017	Sobetsu	William Buick	Charlie Appleby	Godolphin	2:05.92
2018	Laurens	P. J. McDonald	Karl Burke	John Dance	2:08.39
2019	Siyarafina	Christophe Soumillon	Alain de Royer-Dupré	Aga Khan IV	2:06.48
2020	Tawkeel (Note: The 2020 race was run at Chantilly in June due to the COVID-19 pandemic in France)	Cristian Demuro	Jean-Claude Rouget	Hamdan Al Maktoum	2:01.62
2021	Incarville	Christophe Soumillon	David Smaga	Gerard Augustin-Normand	2:10.45
2022	Above The Curve	Ryan Moore	Joseph Patrick O'Brien	Magnier / Tabor / Smith / Westerberg	2:06.25
2023	Jannah Rose	Christophe Soumillon	Carlos Laffon-Parias	Al Shira'aa Farms	2:08.37
2024	Birthe	Aurelien Lemaitre	Laura Vanska	Alain Jathiere & Mme Christine Guilbert	2:07.74
2025	Gezora	Mickael Barzalona	Francis-Henri Graffard	White Birch Farm	2:04.10
2026	Lapotheose	Alexis Pouchin	Yann Barberot	Riviere Equine S A R L & Maurice Lagasse	2:03:41

== Earlier winners ==
- 1960: La Motte
- 1961: Solitude
- 1962: La Sega
- 1963: Cervinia
- 1964: Belle Sicambre
- 1965: Scala
- 1966: Tonnera
- 1967: Tidra
- 1968: no race
- 1969: Saraca
- 1970: Lalika

== See also ==
- List of French flat horse races
