= Ivanjica (horse) =

American-bred Thoroughbred racehorse (1972–1992)

- Sire: Sir Ivor
- Grandsire: Sir Gaylord
- Dam: Astuce
- Damsire: Vieux Manoir
- Sex: Filly
- Foaled: 3 May 1972
- Country: United States
- Colour: Bay
- Breeder: Jacques Wertheimer
- Owner: Jacques Wertheimer
- Trainer: Alec Head

Major wins
- Prix de la Nonette (1975); Poule d'Essai des Pouliches (1975); Prix Vermeille (1975); Prix du Prince d'Orange (1976); Prix de l'Arc de Triomphe (1976); Timeform rating: 132
- Last updated on 1 November 2024

Ivanjica (3 May 1972 – 1992) was an American-bred, French-trained Thoroughbred racehorse and broodmare. Amongst her Group One victories were the French 1000 Guineas in 1975 and the Prix de l'Arc de Triomphe in 1976. Ivanjica has a unique distinction for a racehorse of having her portrait painted by Pop artist Andy Warhol.

== Background ==
Ivanjica was bred by her owner Jacques Wertheimer at Claiborne Farm in Paris, Kentucky. She was sired by Epsom Derby winner Sir Ivor out of the mare Astuce by the important French sire Vieux Manoir. The filly was named for the town of Ivanjica in the Moravica District of Serbia.

Ivanjica was trained by Alec Head and ridden by his son Freddy.

== Racing career ==
In 1975, Ivanjica won the French 1000 Guineas but was denied the opportunity to win the French Oaks as the race was cancelled owing to industrial action. In autumn, she won the Prix Vermeille.

In 1976, Ivanjica won the Prix du Prince d'Orange and then capped off her career by giving owner Jacques Wertheimer the first of his two Prix de l'Arc de Triomphe wins. After Ivanjica finished third to Youth in the Washington, D.C. International Stakes she was retired.

== Stud record ==
Retired to broodmare service, Ivanjica produced offspring that had limited success in racing. She died in 1992 after producing six foals.

== Pedigree ==
Pedigree of Ivanjica (USA), bay mare, 1972
Sire Sir Ivor (USA)	Sir Gaylord (USA)	Turn-To	Royal Charger
Sire Sir Ivor (USA)	Sir Gaylord (USA)	Turn-To	Source Sucree
Sire Sir Ivor (USA)	Sir Gaylord (USA)	Somethingroyal	Princequillo
Sire Sir Ivor (USA)	Sir Gaylord (USA)	Somethingroyal	Imperatrice
Sire Sir Ivor (USA)	Attica (USA)	Mr. Trouble	Mahmoud
Sire Sir Ivor (USA)	Attica (USA)	Mr. Trouble	Motto
Sire Sir Ivor (USA)	Attica (USA)	Athenia	Pharamond
Sire Sir Ivor (USA)	Attica (USA)	Athenia	Salaminia
Dam Astuce (FR)	Vieux Manoir (FR)	Brantome	Blandford
Dam Astuce (FR)	Vieux Manoir (FR)	Brantome	Vitamine
Dam Astuce (FR)	Vieux Manoir (FR)	Vieille Maison	Finglas
Dam Astuce (FR)	Vieux Manoir (FR)	Vieille Maison	Vieille Canaille
Dam Astuce (FR)	Ashleen (FR)	Alizier	Teleferique
Dam Astuce (FR)	Ashleen (FR)	Alizier	Alizarine
Dam Astuce (FR)	Ashleen (FR)	Asheratt	Sunny Trace
Dam Astuce (FR)	Ashleen (FR)	Asheratt	Fee Esterel (Family 12-e)
