= Freddy Head =

French jockey and horse trainer

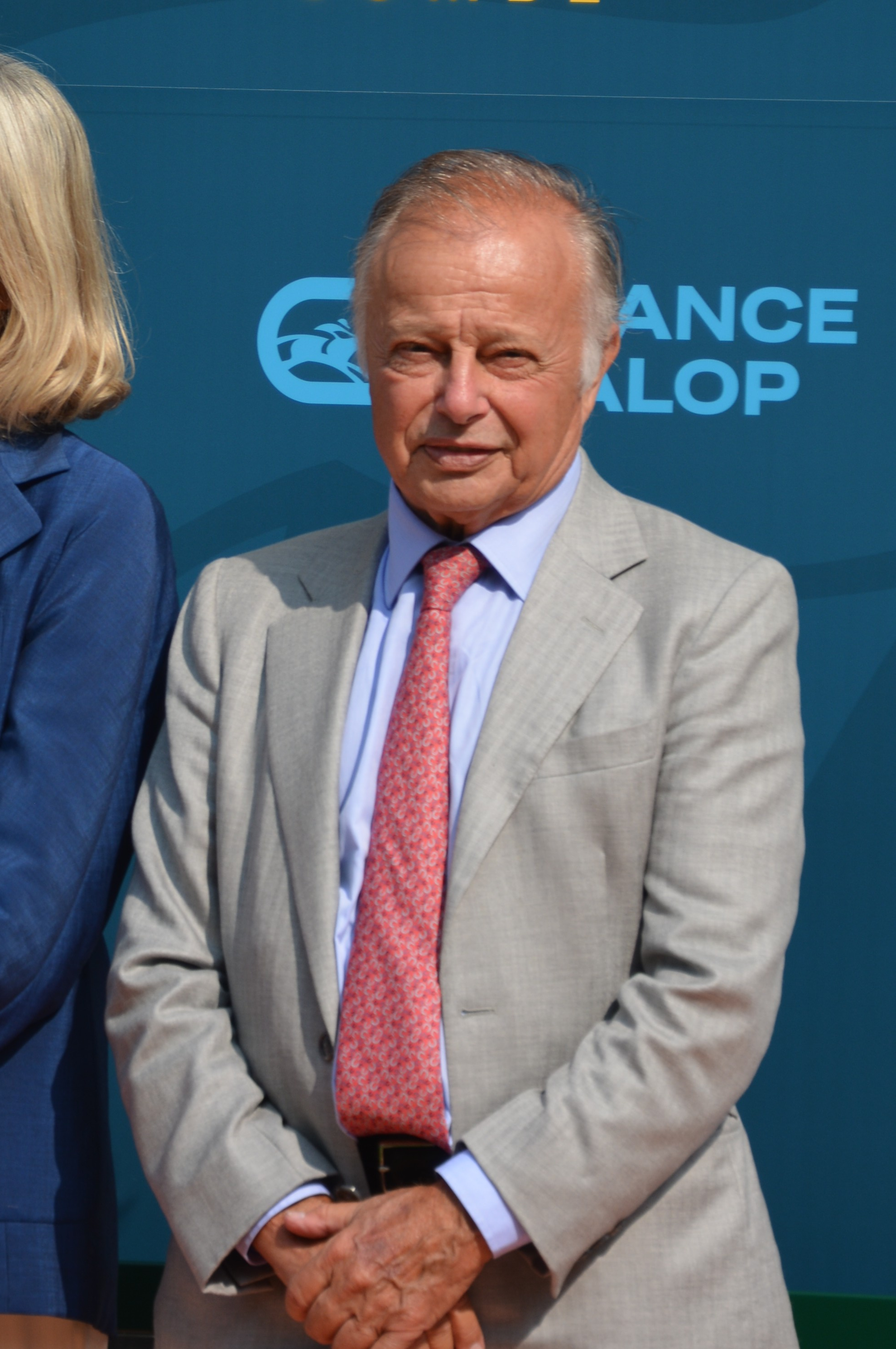

Personal information
- Born: 19 June 1947 (age 79) Neuilly, France
- Occupation: Jockey / Trainer

Horse racing career
- Sport: Horse racing
- Career wins: Not found

Major racing wins
- as a jockey Prix de l'Arc de Triomphe (1966, 1972, 1976, 1979); Prix de la Forêt (1966, 1968, 1972, 1983, 1990); Prix d'Astarté (1967, 1970, 1982, 1985, 1989, 1992); Prix Jacques Le Marois (1967, 1972, 1981, 1987, 1988, 1991); Prix de l'Abbaye de Longchamp (1967, 1978); Prix Saint-Alary (1967, 1971, 1976, 1978-1979, 1982, 1985-1986, 1991); Grand Prix de Paris (1968, 1969); Critérium de Maisons-Laffitte (1968, 1972, 1977, 1984); Prix Royal-Oak (1968, 1971, 1974, 1980, 1984,1989); Prix du Jockey Club (1969, 1973, 1975, 1976); Prix de Diane (1971, 1978, 1982, 1986); Prix Vermeille (1971, 1978, 1979); Prix Morny (1971, 1979, 1989, 1990); Prix d'Ispahan (1972, 1978, 1986, 1988); Prix de la Salamandre (1974, 1979, 1982, 1985, 1986, 1987, 1989, 1990); Poule d'Essai des Poulains (1975, 1976, 1988, 1990, 1991, 1992); Poule d'Essai des Pouliches (1975, 1976, 1978, 1979, 1985, 1987, 1995, 1997); Prix Lupin (1975, 1976, 1991, 1992); Grand Prix de Saint-Cloud (1976, 1977, 1979); Prix du Moulin de Longchamp (1980, 1981, 1987); Prix du Cadran (1981, 1983); Grand Critérium (1982, 1990); Grand Prix de Deauville (1983); Prix Ganay (1986); Prix Marcel Boussac (1986, 1994); Prix Maurice de Gheest (1996) International race wins: 2,000 Guineas (1982); 1,000 Guineas (1983, 1987); Breeders' Cup Mile (1987, 1988); Diadem Stakes (1990) Cheveley Park Stakes (1996); July Cup (1996)

Racing awards
- Champion Jockey in France (6 times)

Significant horses
- Pistol Packer, Riverman, Lyphard, San San, Green Dancer, Val de l'Orne, Ivanjica, Riverqueen, Youth, Three Troikas, Gold River, Blushing John, Ma Biche, Miesque, Hector Protector
- Updated on 25 October 2008

Frédéric Head (born 19 June 1947) is a retired horse trainer and champion jockey in Thoroughbred horse racing. His grandfather, William Head, and father, Alec Head, who also competed as prominent jockeys and trainers, raised “Freddy,” at the Haras du Quesnay, initially managed by Alec and later by Martine Head (Freddy's sister), in Deauville until its closure in November 2022.

In the 1976 Prix de l'Arc de Triomphe, Freddy Head rode to victory on a horse trained by his father and in 1979 took another win on a horse trained by his highly successful sister, Christiane "Criquette" Head. A six-time winner of the French jockey's championship, Freddy Head scored a number of important Group I wins in the United Kingdom and is best known to Americans for his back-to-back victories aboard U.S. Hall of Fame filly Miesque in the 1987 and 1988 Breeders' Cup Mile.

Freddie Head retired as a jockey in 1997 and began working as a trainer. In 2008, he became the first man ever to win Breeders' Cup races as both a jockey and trainer when Goldikova won the Mile.

His legacy lives on in Christopher Head, his son and the trainer of multiple Group 1 winner Blue Rose Cen, and Victoria Head, his daughter and up-and-coming trainer.

== Major wins as a jockey ==
France

- Critérium de Saint-Cloud – (2) - Providential (1979), Poliglote (1994))
- Grand Critérium (Prix Jean-Luc Lagardère) - (2) - Saint Cyrien (1982), Hector Protector (1990)
- Grand Prix de Paris - (2) - Dhaudevi (1968), Chapparal (1969)
- Grand Prix de Saint-Cloud - (3) - Riverqueen (1976), Exceller (1977), Gay Mecene (1979)
- Poule d'Essai des Poulains - (6) - Green Dancer (1975), Red Lord (1976), Blushing John (1988), Linamix (1990), Hector Protector (1991), Shanghai (1992)
- Poule d'Essai des Pouliches - (8) - Ivanjica (1975), Riverqueen (1976), Dancing Maid (1978), Three Troikas (1979), Silvermine (1985), Miesque (1987), Matiara (1995), Always Loyal (1997)
- Prix de l'Abbaye de Longchamp - (2) - Pentathlon (1967), Sigy (1978)
- Prix de l'Arc de Triomphe - (4) - Bon Mot (1966), San San (1972), Ivanjica (1976), Three Troikas (1979)
- Prix d'Astarté - (6) - Carabella (1967), Prudent Miss (1970), Thorough (1982), Northern Aspen (1985), Navratilovna (1986), Hydro Calido (1992)
- Prix du Cadran - (2) - Gold River (1981), Karkour (1983)
- Prix de Diane - (4) - Pistol Packer (1971), Reine de Saba (1978), Harbour (1982), Lacovia (1986)
- Prix de la Forêt - (5) - Barbare (1966), Regent Street (1968), Lyphard (1972), Ma Biche (1983), Septieme Ciel (1990)
- Prix Ganay - (1) - Baillamont (1986)
- Prix d'Ispahan - (4) - Riverman (1972), Carwhite (1978), Baillamont (1986), Miesque (1988)
- Prix Jacques le Marois - (6) - Carabella (1967), Lyphard (1972), Northjet (1981), Miesque (1987 & 1988), Hector Protector (1991)
- Prix Jean Prat - (2) - Riverman (1972), Le Triton (1996)
- Prix du Jockey-Club - (4) - Goodly (1969), Roi Lear (1973), Val de l'Orne (1975), Youth (1976)
- Prix Lupin - (4) - Green Dancer (1975), Youth (1976), Cudas (1991), Johann Quatz (1992)
- Prix Marcel Boussac - (2) - Miesque (1986), Macoumba (1994)
- Prix Maurice de Gheest - (1) - Anabaa (1996)
- Prix Morny - (4) - Daring Display (1971), Princesse Lida (1979), Machiavellian (1989), Hector Protector (1990)
- Prix du Moulin de Longchamp - (3) - Kilijaro (1980), Northjet (1981), Miesque (1987)
- Prix de l'Opéra - (1) - Reine Mathilde (1984)
- Prix Royal-Oak - (6) - Dhaudevi (1968), Bourbon (1971), Busiris (1974), Gold River (1980), Agent Double (1984), Top Sunrise (1989)
- Prix Saint-Alary - (9) - Tidra (1967), Pistol Packer (1971), Riverqueen (1976), Reine de Saba (1978), Three Troikas (1979), Harbour (1982), Fitnah (1985), Lacovia (1986), Treble (1991)
- Prix de la Salamandre - (8) - Delmora (1974), Princesse Lida (1979), Maximova (dead-heat, 1982), Baiser Vole (1985), Miesque (1986), Common Grounds (1987), Machiavellian (1989), Hector Protector (1990)
- Prix Vermeille - (3) - Pistol Packer (1971), Dancing Maid (1978), Three Troikas (1979)

Canada

- E. P. Taylor Stakes - (1) - Devalois (1985)

Germany

- Grosser Preis von Berlin - (1) - Lydian (1981)

(United Kingdom) Great Britain

- 1,000 Guineas - (2) - Ma Biche (1983), Miesque (1987)
- 2,000 Guineas - (1) - Zino (1982)
- Cheveley Park Stakes - (2) - Ma Biche (1982), Pas de Reponse (1996)
- Cork and Orrery Stakes (Golden Jubilee Stakes) - (1) - King's Company (1971)
- July Cup - (1) - Anabaa (1996)
- Racing Post Trophy - (1) - Green Dancer (1974)

(Republic of Ireland) Ireland

- Irish 2,000 Guineas - (1) - King's Company (1971)
- National Stakes - (1) - King's Company (1970)

Italy

- Gran Premio del Jockey Club - (1) - Authi (1974)
- Gran Premio di Milano - (1) - Beau Charmeur (1972)

United States

- Breeders' Cup Mile - (2) - Miesque (1987 & 1988)

== Major wins as a trainer ==
France

- Prix de l'Abbaye de Longchamp - (1) - Marchand d'Or (2008)
- Prix de la Forêt - (2) - Goldikova (2010), Moonlight Cloud (2013)
- Prix d'Ispahan - (3) - Goldikova (2010, 2011), Solow (2015)
- Prix du Cadran - (1) - Call The Wind (2018)
- Prix Jacques Le Marois - (3) - Tamayuz (2008), Goldikova (2009), Moonlight Cloud (2013)
- Prix Jean-Luc Lagardère - (1) - Naaqoos (2008)
- Prix Jean Prat - (2) - Tamayuz (2008), Charm Spirit (2014)
- Prix Maurice de Gheest - (6) - Marchand d'Or (2006, 2007, 2008), Moonlight Cloud (2011, 2012, 2013)
- Prix du Moulin de Longchamp - (3) - Goldikova (2008), Moonlight Cloud (2012), Charm Spirit (2014)
- Prix de l'Opéra - (1) - We Are (2014)
- Prix Rothschild - (5) - Goldikova (2008, 2009, 2010, 2011), With You (2018)
- Prix Saint-Alary - (1) - Queen's Jewel (2015)
- Prix Vermeille - (1) - Galikova (2011)

(United Kingdom) Great Britain

- Falmouth Stakes - (1) - Goldikova (2009)
- July Cup - (1) - Marchand d'Or (2008)
- Queen Anne Stakes - (2) - Goldikova (2010), Solow (2015)
- Queen Elizabeth II Stakes - (2) - Charm Spirit (2014), Solow (2015)
- Sussex Stakes - (1) - Solow (2015)

United States

- Breeders' Cup Mile - (3) - Goldikova (2008, 2009, 2010)

United Arab Emirates

- Dubai Turf - (1) - Solow (2015)
