= Pawneese =

Irish-bred, French-trained Thoroughbred racehorse

- Racing silks of Daniel Wildenstein
- Sire: Carvin
- Grandsire: Marino
- Dam: Plencia
- Damsire: Le Haar
- Sex: Filly
- Foaled: 1973
- Country: Ireland
- Colour: Bay
- Breeder: Dayton Ltd.
- Owner: Daniel Wildenstein
- Trainer: Angel Penna Sr.
- Record: 10: 6-1-0
- Earnings: €330,113 (equivalent)

Major wins
- Prix Penelope (1976); Prix Cléopâtre (1976); Epsom Oaks (1976); Prix de Diane (1976); K. George VI & Q. Elizabeth Stakes (1976)

Awards
- Top-rated European three-year-old filly (1976); British Horse of the Year (1976); Timeform rating: 131
- Last updated on 17 September 2025

Pawneese (5 April 1973 – 1997) was an Irish-bred, French-trained Thoroughbred racehorse who was Europe's top filly in 1976. As a three-year-old that year she won three Group One races – two Classics and Britain's major all-aged race, the King George VI & Queen Elizabeth Stakes.

== Background ==
Pawneese was bred in Ireland by her owner, Daniel Wildenstein, she was sired by Grand Prix de Vichy winner Carvin and out of the mare Plencia, a daughter of Le Haar, 1963's Leading sire in France. She was trained by Angel Penna Sr.

== Racing career ==
Pawneese raced twice at age two without winning. At age three in 1976, under jockey Yves Saint-Martin she won six straight races including a British and a French Classic. She dominated in England's Epsom Oaks, winning by five lengths and in France's Prix de Diane, she ran away from her competition to win by eleven and a half lengths. In July, the filly was sent back to England to run in the King George VI and Queen Elizabeth Stakes at Ascot Racecourse. Up against not only males, but older horses as well, Pawneese defeated a field that included the 1975 St. Leger Stakes winner, Bruni. No French-trained horse would win the King George VI & Queen Elizabeth Stakes for another thirty years until Hurricane Run accomplished the feat in 2006. Her victory was memorialized by noted equine artist Richard Stone Reeves in his painting titled Pawneese defeats Bruni and Orange Boy.

In September 1976, Pawneese ran seventh in the Prix Vermeille and ended her racing career with an eleventh-place finish in the Prix de l'Arc de Triomphe.

== Breeding record ==
Retired to broodmare duty, Pawneese produced at least five foals before she died at age twenty-four on 18 March 1997 at Coolmore Stud in Ireland.

Foals

1992 Poughkeepsie (IRE) : foaled 24 May, by Sadler's Wells (USA) – won 1 race and placed twice from 4 starts in France 1995
