= Prix Vermeille =

Flat horse race in France

- Class: Group 1
- Location: Longchamp Racecourse; Paris, France
- Inaugurated: 1897
- Race type: Flat / Thoroughbred
- Sponsor: Qatar
- Website: france-galop.com

Race information
- Distance: 2,400 metres (1½ miles)
- Surface: Turf
- Track: Right-handed
- Qualification: Three-years-old and up fillies and mares
- Weight: 55 kg (3yo); 58½ kg (4yo+)
- Purse: €600,000 (2021); 1st: €342,840

Prix Vermeille
2026
Friendly Soul	Pink Panthera	Sunly

Previous years
2025
Aventure	Gezora	Bedtime Story
2024
Bluestocking	Aventure	Emily Upjohn
2023
Warm Heart	Melo Melo	Sea Silk Road
2022
Sweet Lady	Lilac Road	La Parisienne
2021
Teona	Snowfall	La Joconde

2020-2011
2020
Tarnawa	Raabihah	Dame Malliot
2019
Star Catcher	Musis Amica	Ligne D'Or
2018
Kitesurf	Magic Wand	Zarkamiya
2017
Bateel	Journey	Left Hand
2016
Left Hand	Endless Time	The Juliet Rose
2015
Treve	Candarliya	Sea Calisi
2014
Baltic Baroness	Pomology	Dolniya
2013
Treve	Wild Coco	Tasaday
2012
Shareta	Pirika	Solemia
2011
Galikova	Testosterone	Shareta

2010–2001
2010
Midday	Plumania	Sarafina
2009
Stacelita	Plumania	Board Meeting
2008
Zarkava	Dar Re Mi	Michita
2007
Mrs Lindsay	West Wind	Passage Of Time
2006
Mandesha	Montare	Royal Highness
2005
Shawanda	Royal Highness	Paita
2004
Sweet Stream	Royal Fantasy	Pride
2003
Mezzo Soprano	Yesterday	Fidelite
2002
Pearly Shells	Ana Marie	Bright Sky
2001
Aquarelliste	Diamilina	Mare Nostrum

2000–1991
2000
Volvoreta	Reve D'Oscar	Egyptband
1999
Daryaba	Etizaaz	Cerulean Sky
1998
Leggera	Cloud Castle	Zainta
1997
Queen Maud	Gazelle Royale	Brilliance
1996
My Emma	Papering	Miss Tahiti
1995
Carling	Valley Of Gold	Larrocha
1994
Sierra Madre	Yenda	State Crystal
1993
Intrepidity	Wemyss Bight	Bright Moon
1992
Jolypha	Cunning	Urban Sea
1991
Magic Night	Pink Turtle	Crnagora

1990–1989
1990
Salsabil	Miss Alleged	In The Groove
1989
Young Mother	Sierra Roberta	Colorado Dancer

The Prix Vermeille is a Group 1 flat horse race in France open to thoroughbred fillies and mares aged three years or older. It is run at Longchamp over a distance of 2,400 metres (about 1½ miles), and it is scheduled to take place each year in September.

== History ==
The event is named after a filly foaled in 1853. She was initially known as Merveille, but was later renamed Vermeille. She did not have a remarkable racing career, but was highly successful as a broodmare.

The Prix Vermeille was established in 1897, and was originally restricted to fillies aged three. Due to World War I, it was abandoned from 1914 to 1918.

The event was cancelled twice during World War II, in 1939 and 1940. It was temporarily switched to Le Tremblay in 1943 and 1944.

The race was opened to four-year-old fillies in 2004, and to older mares in 2006.

Preceded by the Poule d'Essai des Pouliches and the Prix de Diane, the Prix Vermeille is the final leg of France's fillies' Triple Crown. The feat of winning all three has been achieved by six horses, most recently Zarkava in 2008.

The Prix Vermeille is held three weeks before the Prix de l'Arc de Triomphe, and it sometimes serves as a trial for that event. The 2024 winner, Bluestocking was the seventh horse to win both races in the same year.

== Records ==
Most successful horse (2 wins):

- Treve – 2013, 2015

Leading jockey (7 wins):

- Yves Saint-Martin – Golden Girl (1963), Casaque Grise (1967), Saraca (1969), Allez France (1973), Paulista (1974), Sharaya (1983), Darara (1986)

Leading trainer (7 wins):

- Alain de Royer-Dupré – Sharaya (1983), Darara (1986), Daryaba (1999), Shawanda (2005), Mandesha (2006), Zarkava (2008), Shareta (2012)

Leading owner (7 wins):

- Marcel Boussac – Durban (1921), Merry Girl (1928), La Circe (1933), Corteira (1948), Janiari (1956), Arbencia (1957), Astola (1961, dead-heat)
- HH Aga Khan – Sharaya (1983), Darara (1986), Daryaba (1999), Shawanda (2005), Mandesha (2006), Zarkava (2008), Shareta (2012)

== Winners since 1965 ==
Year	Winner	Age	Jockey	Trainer	Owner	Time
1965	Aunt Edith	3	Lester Piggott	Noel Murless	John Hornung	2:31.50
1966	Haltilala	3	Jean Deforge	Geoffroy Watson	Guy de Rothschild	2:34.40
1967	Casaque Grise	3	Yves Saint-Martin	François Mathet	Mrs François Dupré	2:43.70
1968	Roseliere	3	Yann Josse	Georges Bridgland	Mrs Georges Bridgland	2:45.40
1969	Saraca	3	Yves Saint-Martin	François Mathet	Arpad Plesch	2:38.80
1970	Highest Hopes	3	Joe Mercer	Dick Hern	Brook Holliday	2:29.20
1971	Pistol Packer	3	Freddy Head	Alec Head	Ghislaine Head	2:34.70
1972 (dh)	Paysanne; San San	3; 3	Jean Deforge; Jean Cruguet	Geoffroy Watson; Angel Penna	Guy de Rothschild; Countess Batthyany	2:35.60
1973	Allez France	3	Yves Saint-Martin	Albert Klimscha	Daniel Wildenstein	2:43.40
1974	Paulista	3	Yves Saint-Martin	Angel Penna	Daniel Wildenstein	2:33.60
1975	Ivanjica	3	Gary W. Moore	Alec Head	Jacques Wertheimer	2:34.70
1976	Lagunette	3	Philippe Paquet	François Boutin	Marius Berghgracht	2:40.20
1977	Kamicia	3	Alain Badel	Jean Laumain	Mrs Henri Rabatel	2:30.50
1978	Dancing Maid	3	Freddy Head	Alec Head	Jacques Wertheimer	2:34.00
1979	Three Troikas	3	Freddy Head	Criquette Head	Ghislaine Head	2:30.30
1980	Mrs Penny	3	John Matthias	Ian Balding	Eric Kronfeld	2:34.90
1981	April Run	3	Philippe Paquet	François Boutin	Diana Firestone	2:32.90
1982	All Along	3	Greville Starkey	Patrick Biancone	Daniel Wildenstein	2:29.90
1983	Sharaya	3	Yves Saint-Martin	Alain de Royer-Dupré	Aga Khan IV	2:42.10
1984	Northern Trick	3	Cash Asmussen	François Boutin	Stavros Niarchos	2:40.90
1985	Walensee	3	Éric Legrix	Patrick Biancone	Daniel Wildenstein	2:32.70
1986	Darara	3	Yves Saint-Martin	Alain de Royer-Dupré	Aga Khan IV	2:38.70
1987	Bint Pasha	3	Pat Eddery	Paul Cole	Fahd Salman	2:31.70
1988	Indian Rose	3	Tony Cruz	Jean-Marie Béguigné	Guy de Rothschild	2:28.80
1989	Young Mother	3	Alain Badel	Jean-Marie Béguigné	Jean-Marie Béguigné	2:33.10
1990	Salsabil	3	Willie Carson	John Dunlop	Hamdan Al Maktoum	2:29.60
1991	Magic Night	3	Alain Badel	Philippe Demercastel	Mrs P. Demercastel	2:27.80
1992	Jolypha	3	Pat Eddery	André Fabre	Khalid Abdullah	2:32.80
1993	Intrepidity	3	Thierry Jarnet	André Fabre	Sheikh Mohammed	2:36.80
1994	Sierra Madre	3	Gérald Mossé	Pascal Bary	Jean-Louis Bouchard	2:35.30
1995	Carling	3	Thierry Thulliez	Corine Barande-Barbe	Ecurie Delbart	2:32.80
1996	My Emma	3	Cash Asmussen	Rae Guest	Matthews Breeding	2:31.30
1997	Queen Maud	3	Olivier Peslier	Jean de Roualle	Gary Tanaka	2:28.20
1998	Leggera	3	Richard Quinn	John Dunlop	Hildegard Focke	2:41.40
1999	Daryaba	3	Gérald Mossé	Alain de Royer-Dupré	Aga Khan IV	2:30.60
2000	Volvoreta	3	Michael Kinane	Carlos Lerner	Maria-Soledad Vidal	2:26.30
2001	Aquarelliste	3	Dominique Boeuf	Élie Lellouche	Daniel Wildenstein	2:29.40
2002	Pearly Shells	3	Christophe Soumillon	François Rohaut	6C Racing Ltd	2:26.00
2003	Mezzo Soprano	3	Frankie Dettori	Saeed bin Suroor	Godolphin	2:26.10
2004	Sweet Stream	4	Thierry Gillet	John Hammond	Team Valor	2:29.50
2005	Shawanda	3	Christophe Soumillon	Alain de Royer-Dupré	Aga Khan IV	2:32.00
2006	Mandesha	3	Christophe Soumillon	Alain de Royer-Dupré	Zahra Aga Khan	2:29.20
2007	Mrs Lindsay	3	Johnny Murtagh	François Rohaut	Bettina Jenney	2:27.00
2008	Zarkava	3	Christophe Soumillon	Alain de Royer-Dupré	Aga Khan IV	2:26.00
2009	Stacelita (Note: Dar Re Mi finished first in 2009, but she was relegated to fifth place following a stewards' inquiry)	3	Christophe Lemaire	Jean-Claude Rouget	Schwartz / Monastic	2:29.10
2010	Midday	4	Tom Queally	Henry Cecil	Khalid Abdullah	2:32.40
2011	Galikova	3	Olivier Peslier	Freddy Head	Wertheimer et Frère	2:34.38
2012	Shareta	4	Christophe Lemaire	Alain de Royer-Dupré	Aga Khan IV	2:29.06
2013	Treve	3	Frankie Dettori	Criquette Head-Maarek	Sheikh Joaan al Thani	2:36.82
2014	Baltic Baroness	4	Maxime Guyon	André Fabre	Gestut Ammerland	2:28.22
2015	Treve	5	Thierry Jarnet	Criquette Head-Maarek	Al Shaqab Racing	2:34.09
2016	Left Hand (Note: The 2016 and 2017 races took place at Chantilly while Longchamp was closed for redevelopment)	3	Maxime Guyon	Carlos Laffon-Parias	Wertheimer et Frère	2:33.23
2017	Bateel	5	Pierre-Charles Boudot	Francis-Henri Graffard	Al Asayl Bloodstock	2:32.90
2018	Kitesurf	4	Mickael Barzalona	André Fabre	Godolphin	2:26.39
2019	Star Catcher	3	Frankie Dettori	John Gosden	Anthony Oppenheimer	2:27.63
2020	Tarnawa	4	Christophe Soumillon	Dermot Weld	Aga Khan IV	2:26.42
2021	Teona	3	Olivier Peslier	Roger Varian	Ali Saeed	2:31.99
2022	Sweet Lady	4	Grégory Benoist	Francis-Henri Graffard	Gemini Stud	2:35.50
2023	Warm Heart	3	James Doyle	Aidan O'Brien	Magnier /Tabor / Smith / Westerberg	2:31.29
2024	Bluestocking	4	Rossa Ryan	Ralph Beckett	Juddmonte	2:31.53
2025	Aventure	4	Maxime Guyon	Christophe Ferland	Wertheimer et Frère	2:29.34
2026	Friendly Soul	5	James Doyle	John & Thady Gosden	George Strawbridge	2:25.46

== Earlier winners ==
- 1897: Ortie Blanche
- 1898: Melina
- 1899: Sesara
- 1900: Semendria
- 1901: La Camargo
- 1902: Ophelia
- 1903: Mater
- 1904: Profane
- 1905: Brienne
- 1906: Bethsaida
- 1907: Claudia
- 1908: Medeah
- 1909: Ronde de Nuit
- 1910: Basse Pointe
- 1911: Tripolette
- 1912: Reveuse
- 1913: Moia
- 1914–18: no race
- 1919: Stearine
- 1920: Meddlesome Maid
- 1921: Durban
- 1922: Sainte Ursule
- 1923: Quoi
- 1924: Isola Bella
- 1925: La Habanera
- 1926: Dorina
- 1927: Samphire
- 1928: Merry Girl
- 1929: Calandria
- 1930: Commanderie
- 1931: Pearl Cap
- 1932: Kiddie
- 1933: La Circe
- 1934: Mary Tudor
- 1935: Crisa
- 1936: Mistress Ford
- 1937: Tonnelle
- 1938: Ma Normandie
- 1939–40: no race
- 1941: Longthanh
- 1942: Vigilance
- 1943: Folle Nuit
- 1944: La Belle du Canet
- 1945: Nikellora
- 1946: Pirette
- 1947: Procureuse
- 1948: Corteira
- 1949: Bagheera
- 1950: Kilette
- 1951: Orberose
- 1952: La Mirambule
- 1953: Radio
- 1954: Philante
- 1955: Wild Miss
- 1956: Janiari
- 1957: Arbencia
- 1958: Bella Paola
- 1959: Mi Carina
- 1960: Lezghinka
- 1961: Anne la Douce / Astola (Note: The 1961 race was a dead-heat and has joint winners)
- 1962: Monade
- 1963: Golden Girl
- 1964: Astaria

== See also ==
- List of French flat horse races
