= Alec Head =

French horse trainer and breeder (1924–2022)

Alec Head (31 July 1924 – 22 June 2022) was a French horse trainer and breeder. After a brief career as a flat and jump Jockey in the 1940s, he became a successful flat-racing trainer, winning four Prix de l'Arc de Triomphe titles with horses owner by prestigious stables such as Wertheimer et Frère. He later acquired Haras du Quesnay, a stud farm in Calvados, from which he exerted considerable influence over Thoroughbred breeding in France.

He was the father of trainer Criquette Head-Maarek and jockey-turned-trainer Freddy Head, two other leading figures in French horse racing.

== Biography ==
Racing colours of Alec Head

Alec Head descended from two English families who settled in France in the 19th century and went up to achieve several degrees of success in horse racing. On his paternal side, his grandfather William Johnson was a leading jump jockey who won the Grande Course de Haies d'Auteuil in 1889; his son, William head, won two editions of the Prix de l'Arc de Triomphe with Le Paillon in 1947, and with Bon Mot in 1966.

On his maternal side, Alec Head was the grandson of Henry Jennings, who won four editions of the Prix du Jockey Club, and seven editions of the Prix de Diane as a trainer between the 1840s and 1880s.

== Career ==
Alec Head began his career as a jockey during World War II, achieving success in both jump racing, winning the Grande Course de Haies d'Auteuil in 1946, and flat racing. A serious fall led him to retire from riding in 1947 at the age of 23.

Supported by Pierre Wertheimer's racing stable, and later by the Aga Khan, Head returned to the racing world as a trainer. In the 1960s, Head reportedly was training 140 horses, the majority being owned by Pierre Wertheimer or the Aga Khan IV. Primarily training horses for these two prominent owners, Head achieved numerous prestigious victories in France and England including the Epsom Derby, the 1,000 Guineas, four Prix de l'Arc de Triomphe titles—Nuccio in 1952, Saint-Crespin in 1962 for the Aga Khan dynasty, Ivanjica in 1976, and Gold River in 1981 for the Wertheimer family—three Prix du Jockey Club titles, and two Prix de Diane victories, among other successes.

In 1958, Head, together with his father and brother, acquired Haras du Quesnay, located near Deauville. The estate comprised a 15th-century Château within 667 acres of land, with 220 horse stalls. Head undertook extensive restoration of the facilities and in 1959 brought in the farm's first stallion. Over the years, he and his wife Ghislaine developed Haras du Quesnay into one of the leading stud farms in France, pioneering the practice of visits to the United States to purchase promising yearlings. Among his most notable acquisitions were Lyphard and Riverman, both of whom he trained as racehorses before they became influential sires.

The Haras du Quesnay breeding operation continued to achieve success in subsequent decades, notably through stallions such as Anabaa. Horses bred there or associated with the Head family included Treve, bred at the stud and winner of the Prix de l'Arc de Triomphe in 2013 and 2014 ; Detroit, winner of the Arc in 1980; and Goldikova, a daughter of Anabaa.

In 2018, interviewed about his career, he spoke about starting out as a jockey in 1942:

"We raced through the war and it was tough, and I used to bicycle everywhere. The Germans would go to the races as well, so racing continued but a lot of the courses were shut, so they organised Flat and Jumps meetings at the few that were open, such as Auteuil and Maisons-Laffitte".

Head died on 22 June 2022, at the age of 97.
