= 1975 Prix de l'Arc de Triomphe =

- Location: Longchamp Racecourse
- Date: October 5, 1975
- Winning horse: Star Appeal

The 1975 Prix de l'Arc de Triomphe was a horse race held at Longchamp on Sunday 5 October 1975. It was the 54th running of the Prix de l'Arc de Triomphe.

The winner was Waldemar Zeitelhack's Star Appeal, a five-year-old horse trained in West Germany by Theo Grieper and ridden by Greville Starkey. The owner, trainer and jockey were all recording their first success in the race. Star Appeal was the first German-trained horse to win the Arc. Star Appeal started at odds of 119/1, the longest ever recorded for a winner of the race.

== The contenders ==
In French racing, horses in the same ownership are usually "coupled" and treated as a single entry for betting purposes. The favourite for the race was the five-year-old mare Allez France, winner of the race in 1974. The other leading French contenders included the three-year-olds Ivanjica, (winner of the Poule d'Essai des Pouliches and Prix Vermeille) and Green Dancer (Observer Gold Cup, Poule d'Essai des Poulains), who were coupled in the betting as both were owned by Jacques Wertheimer and trained by Alec Head. Nelson Bunker Hunt was represented by the multiple Group One winner Dahlia and the three-year-old filly Nobiliary, the winner of the Prix Saint Alary and runner-up in the Epsom Derby. The most fancied of the international challengers were the British colt Bruni, winner of the St Leger Stakes, and the Italian-trained four-year-old Duke of Marmalade. The United States was represented by the Hollywood Derby winner Intrepid Hero, and West Germany sent Star Appeal, an Irish-bred five-year-old who had won the Eclipse Stakes in July. Allez France headed the betting at odds of 1.75/1, with Green Dancer/Ivanjica on 3.25/1, Bruni on 4.5/1, Nobiliary/Dahlia on 8.75/1 and Duke of Marmalade on 9.5/1. Star Appeal started the complete outsider of the twenty-four runners at odds of 119/1.

== The race ==
Citoyen went to the front soon after the start with Olmeto in second. Nobilary, Dahlia, Carolus, Un Kopeck and Allez France were also in contention in the early stages. At half distance the field bunched and there was a good deal of bumping and interference. Dahlia stumbled and lost any chance, whilst Allez France also lost ground. Nobiliary led the field into the straight ahead of Un Kopeck, Kasteel, Bruni and Duke of Marmalade. Comtesse de Loir produced a strong run along the rail to head Nobiliary but was immediately overtaken by Star Appeal who burst through "like greased lightning" having been among the back markers for most of the way. In the final 100 metres, Star Appeal drew away to win by three lengths from another fast-finishing outsider On My Way. Comtesse de Loir was another two and a half lengths back in third, followed by Un Kopeck, Allez France, Nobiliary, Bruni and Green Dancer.

== Race details ==
- Sponsor: none
- Purse:
- Going: Soft
- Distance: 2,400 metres
- Number of runners: 24
- Winner's time: 2:33.6

== Full result ==
Pos.	Marg.	Horse	Age	Jockey	Trainer (Country)
1		Star Appeal	5	Greville Starkey	Theo Grieper (GER)
2	3	On My Way	5	Alfred Gibert	N Pelat (FR)
3	2½	Comtesse de Loir	4	Jean-Claude Desaint	John Cunnington (FR)
4	1½	Un Kopeck	4	Maurice Philipperon	John Cunnington (FR)
5	1½	Allez France	5	Yves Saint-Martin	Angel Penna Sr. (FR)
6	nk	Nobiliary	3	Bill Pyers	Maurice Zilber (FR)
7	snk	Bruni	3	Tony Murray	Ryan Price (GB)
8	¾	Green Dancer	3	George Moore	Alec Head (FR)
9	1½	Kamaraan	4	Henri Samani	François Mathet (FR)
10	ns	Intrepid Hero	3	Angel Cordero	(USA)
11		Duke of Marmalade	4	Lester Piggott	M Bertini (ITA)
12		Ivanjica	3	Freddy Head	Alec Head (FR)
13		Riboquill	4	Pat Eddery
14		Kasteel	3	Gérard Rivases	J de Choubersky (FR)
15		Dahlia	5	N Navarro	Maurice Zilber (FR)
16		Olmeto	3	Philippe Paquet
17		Henri le Balafre	3	Alain Lequeux	François Mathet (FR)
18		Ambrellita	4	Alain Badel
19		Card King	7	R Jallu	Edouard Bartholomew (FR)
20		Beau Buck	4	Gerard Dubroeucq	John Cunnington (FR)
21		Fabliau	4	R Mongil
22		Carolus	3	Geoff Lewis	Ryan Price (GB)
23		Paddy's Princess	4	M Depalmas
24		Citoyen	3	J Taillard	J de Choubersky (FR)

* Abbreviations: ns = nose; shd = short-head; hd = head; snk = short neck; nk = neck

== Winner's details ==
Further details of the winner, Star Appeal.

- Sex: Stallion
- Foaled: 12 May 1970
- Country: Ireland
- Sire: Appiani; Dam: Sterna (Neckar)
- Owner: Waldemar Zeitelhack
- Breeder: Gestut Röttgen
