= 1973 Prix de l'Arc de Triomphe =

- Location: Longchamp Racecourse
- Date: October 7, 1973
- Winning horse: Rheingold

The 1973 Prix de l'Arc de Triomphe was a horse race held at Longchamp on Sunday 7 October 1973. It was the 52nd running of the Prix de l'Arc de Triomphe.

The winner was Henry Zeisel's Rheingold, an Irish-bred four-year-old colt trained in England by Barry Hills and ridden by Lester Piggott. Rheingold's owner, trainer and jockey were winning the race for the first time. Piggott went on to win two more Arcs on Alleged in 1977 and 1978.

Rheingold was the fifth British-trained horse to win the race after Comrade, Parth, Migoli and Mill Reef.

== The contenders ==
The leading French contender for the race was the American-bred three-year-old filly Allez France, the winner of the Critérium des Pouliches, Poule d'Essai des Pouliches, Prix de Diane, Prix d'Ispahan and Prix Vermeille. and Prix Ganay. The other French runners included Tennyson, the winner of the Grand Prix de Paris, Dahlia (Prix Saint-Alary, Irish Oaks, King George VI and Queen Elizabeth Stakes), Lady Berry (Prix de Pomone) and San San the winner of the race in 1972. A five horse British entry was headed by the four-year-old colt Rheingold who had finished runner-up in the 1972 Epsom Derby but produced his best performances in France, winning the Prix Ganay and two runnings of the Grand Prix de Saint-Cloud. The other British challengers were the Yorkshire Oaks winner Attica Meli, the Irish St Leger winner Parnell, the Great Voltigeur Stakes winner Buoy and the improving four-year-old handicapper Firefright. and the Prix de Diane and also included the Eclipse Stakes winner Coup de Feu and the dual Goodwood Cup winner Proverb. Ireland was represented by the four-year-olds Bonne Noel (Ebor Handicap) and Miss Therese and the three-year-olds Ragapan (runner-up in the Irish Derby), Star Appeal and Hurry Harriet. The only challenger from outside Europe was the Argentinian four-year-old Unicornus. Allez France was made the 1.75/1 favourite ahead of Tennyson (5.75/1), Rheingold (7.7/1), Dahlia (8/1) and Lady Berry (8.75/1).

== The race ==
The outsiders Direct Flight and Authi disputed the early lead ahead of Unicornus, Bonne Noel, Miss Therese, Hard To Beat, Rheingold, Buoy, Balompie and Allez France. On the turn into the straight, Authi held the advantage from Direct Flight, Rheingold and Hard To Beat, with Balompie and Buoy well-placed on the outside and Allez France making progress along the inside rail. Early in the straight, Piggott sent Rheingold into the lead and the British-trained quickly accelerated at least three lengths clear of his rivals. Allez France moved into second place and was the only horse to offer a serious challenge to the leader, but Rheingold stayed on strongly to beat the filly by two and a half lengths. Hard To Beat was four lengths back in third, two lengths ahead of Card King, with Lady Berry, Sang Bleu and Balompie the next to finish.

== Race details ==
- Sponsor: none
- Purse: ₣1,497,000
- Going: Soft
- Distance: 2,400 metres
- Number of runners: 27
- Winner's time: 2:35.8

== Full result ==
Pos.	Marg.	Horse	Age	Jockey	Trainer (Country)
1		Rheingold	4	Lester Piggott	Barry Hills (GB)
2	2½	Allez France	3	Yves Saint-Martin	Albert Klimscha (FR)
3	4	Hard To Beat	4	Gerard Thiboeuf	Robert Carver (FR)
4	2	Card King	5	Gianfranco Dettori	Edouard Bartholomew (FR)
5	nk	Lady Berry	3	Maurice Depalmas	Geoffroy Watson (FR)
6	shd	Sang Bleu	4	J Taillard	(FR)
7	¾	Balompie	3	Jean Cruguet	Angel Penna Sr. (FR)
8	2	Buoy	3	Joe Mercer	Dick Hern (GB)
9	hd	Lassalle	4	Jimmy Lindley	Robert Carver (FR)
10	nk	Tennyson	3	Alfred Gibert	Peter Head (FR)
11	1	Ragapan	3	Tony Murray	Kevin Prendergast (IRE)
12	1	San San	3	Sandy Barclay	Angel Penna Sr. (FR)
13	2	Star Appeal	3	Peter Alafi	John Oxx Sr. (IRE)
14	3	Novius	4	Jean-Claude Desaint	Freddie Palmer (FR)
15	hd	Primette	4	Gerard Rivases	(FR)
16	nk	Dahlia	3	Bill Pyers	Maurice Zilber (FR)
17	1	Firefright	4	Paul Cook	Bill Marshall (GB)
18	nk	Parnell	5	Willie Carson	Bernard van Cutsem (GB)
19	2	Hurry Harriet	3	Angel Cordero	Paddy Mullins (IRE)
20		Authi	3	Freddy Head	Alec Head (FR)
21		Mister Sic Top	6	R Litt	(FR)
22		Attica Meli	4	Geoff Lewis	Noel Murless (GB)
23		Direct Flight	4	Maurice Philipperon	(FR)
24		El Famoso	3	E Belmonte	(FR)
25		Bonne Noel	4	Bill Williamson	Paddy Prendergast (IRE)
26		Unicornus	4	Georges Doleuze	(ARG)
27		Miss Therese	4	Edward Hide	(IRE)

- Abbreviations: ns = nose; shd = short-head; hd = head; snk = short neck; nk = neck

== Winner's details ==
Further details of the winner, Rheingold

- Sex: Colt
- Foaled: 1969
- Country: Ireland
- Sire: Faberge; Dam: Athene (Supreme Court)
- Owner: Henry K. Zeisel
- Breeder: James Russell
