= Mariacci =

French Thoroughbred racehorse and sire

- Sire: Djakao
- Grandsire: Tanerko
- Dam: Marbrisa
- Damsire: Exbury
- Sex: Stallion
- Foaled: 13 April 1972
- Country: France
- Colour: Bay
- Breeder: Guy de Rothschild
- Owner: Guy de Rothschild
- Trainer: Jean-Michel de Choubersky
- Record: 7:4-2-1

Major wins
- Prix des Chênes (1974); Grand Critérium (1974); Prix Greffulhe (1975)

Awards
- Timeform rating 133 (1974), 128 (1975); Top-rated French two-year-old (1974)

Mariacci (foaled 13 April 1972) was a French Thoroughbred racehorse and sire. He was the highest-rated two-year-old trained in France in 1974, when he was unbeaten in three race including the Prix des Chênes and the Grand Critérium. After extending his winning run to four when winning the Prix Greffulhe on his debut as a three-year-old, he was beaten in his three subsequent races but continued to display top-class form when being placed in the Prix Lupin, Prix du Jockey Club and Prix d'Ispahan. Despite being retired in the summer of his second season, Mariacci defeated many of the best French horses of his era including Allez France, Ivanjica, Green Dancer, Val de l'Orne and Nobiliary. He made little impact as a breeding stallion.

== Background ==
Mariacci was a "neat, good-looking" bay horse bred in France by his owner Guy de Rothschild. His sire, Djakao, was a stayer who won the Grand Prix de Deauville and was placed in both the Prix du Jockey Club and the Grand Prix de Paris in 1969. The best of Djakao's other progeny included the Arlington Million winner Perrault and the Prix Lupin winner Belgio. Mariacci's dam Marbrisa was a moderate racehorse but was a granddaughter of Temora, a half-sister of The Derby winner Galcador. During his racing career, Mariacci was trained by Jean-Michel de Choubersky.

== Racing career ==
=== 1974: two-year-old season ===
Mariacci began his racing career in the Prix de Crèvecœur for previously unraced horses over 1400 metres at Deauville Racecourse in August and won by three quarters of a length. In September, the colt was moved up in class and distance for the Prix des Chênes over 1600 metres at Longchamp. Starting at odds of 7/1 he was restrained in last place before making ground to challenge for the lead in the straight. He moved up alongside Green Dancer 200 metres from the finish and after a "sharp struggle" prevailed by half a length with the pair finishing eight lengths clear of Mister Jacket in third place. The form of the race was subsequently boosted when Green Dancer was sent to England and won the Observer Gold Cup. On his final appearance of the season, Maricci contested France's most prestigious race for two-year-olds, the Grand Critérium at Longchamp on 13 October. Ridden by Gerard Rivases, he started the 4.3/1 third favourite in the betting behind the Angel Penna Sr.-trained Val du Fier and the Prix La Rochette winner Dandy Lute: the other runners included Sky Commander (Prix Robert Papin), Val de l'Orne and Nobiliary. Restrained by Rivases in the early stages, Mariacci overtook Val de l'Orne 200 metres from the finish and drew away in the closing stages to win by two lengths.

=== 1975: three-year-old season ===
On his first appearance as a three-year-old, Mariacci started 11/10 favourite against sixteen opponents in the Prix Greffulhe over 2100 metres at Longchamp on 6 April. Rivases employed exaggerated waiting tactics, delaying his challenge until the last 200 metres but Mariacci maintained his unbeaten record, winning by a nose and a head from Good Point and Top Gear. On 18 May, over the same course and distance, Mariacci faced Green Dancer again in the Prix Lupin. The two colts engaged in a prolonged struggle in the straight, and Green Dancer inflicted Mariacci's first defeat as he prevailed by three quarters of a length. There was a gap of six lengths back to Matahawk, who went on to win the Grand Prix de Paris. Green Dancer was sent to England for The Derby and in the Prix du Jockey Club over 2400 metres at Chantilly Racecourse on 8 June Mariacci started second favourite behind Val de l'Orne. After fighting Rivases's attempts to restrain him in the early stages he looked likely to make a serious challenge in the straight before finishing third, beaten a head and two and a half lengths by Val de l'Orne and Patch. Mariacci was matched against older horses for the first time in the Prix d'Ispahan over 1850 metres on 29 June. Starting the 4/1 second favourite he proved too good for Allez France and Ivanjica but, in a huge upset, he finished second to the 33/1 outsider Ramirez.

== Assessment ==
There was no International Classification of European two-year-olds in 1974: the official handicappers of Britain, Ireland and France compiled separate rankings for horses which competed in those countries. In the official French handicap, Mariacci was the top-rated two-year-old of the year, one pound ahead of Green Dancer and two ahead of the filly Broadway Dancer. The independent Timeform organisation gave him a rating of 133, one pound behind their best two-year-old Grundy. In their annual Racehorses of 1974 Timeform described Mariacci as "superior to any staying colt we know about" and said that he would be "very difficult to beat" if he was to contest the Epsom Derby. In 1975, Mariacci was given a rating of 128 by Timeform, nine pounds below their Horse of the Year Grundy. In the official French handicap he was rated the fourth-best three-year-old colt of the year behind Val de l'Orne, Patch and Green Dancer.

== Stud record ==
Mariacci did not race again after finishing second in the Prix d'Ispahan and was retired to stand at the Haras du Meautry at an initial fee of 20,000 francs. He sired very few recorded foals, but these included Mariacho, who won the Prix Saint-Roman in 1980.

== Pedigree ==
Pedigree of Mariacci (FR), bay stallion, 1972
| Sire Djakao (FR) 1966 | Tarnerko (FR); 1953 | Tantieme | Deux-Pour-Cent |
| Sire Djakao (FR) 1966 | Tarnerko (FR); 1953 | Tantieme | Terka |
| Sire Djakao (FR) 1966 | Tarnerko (FR); 1953 | La Divine | Fair Copy |
| Sire Djakao (FR) 1966 | Tarnerko (FR); 1953 | La Divine | La Diva |
| Sire Djakao (FR) 1966 | Diagonale (FR); 1959 | Ribot | Tenerani |
| Sire Djakao (FR) 1966 | Diagonale (FR); 1959 | Ribot | Romanella |
| Sire Djakao (FR) 1966 | Diagonale (FR); 1959 | Barley Corn | Hyperion |
| Sire Djakao (FR) 1966 | Diagonale (FR); 1959 | Barley Corn | Schiaparelli |
| Dam Marbrisa (FR) 1966 | Exbury (FR); 1959 | Le Haar | Vieux Manoir |
| Dam Marbrisa (FR) 1966 | Exbury (FR); 1959 | Le Haar | Mince Pie |
| Dam Marbrisa (FR) 1966 | Exbury (FR); 1959 | Greensward | Mossborough |
| Dam Marbrisa (FR) 1966 | Exbury (FR); 1959 | Greensward | Stargrass |
| Dam Marbrisa (FR) 1966 | Supremora (FR); 1958 | Supreme Court | Precipitation |
| Dam Marbrisa (FR) 1966 | Supremora (FR); 1958 | Supreme Court | Forecourt |
| Dam Marbrisa (FR) 1966 | Supremora (FR); 1958 | Temora | Tourbillon |
| Dam Marbrisa (FR) 1966 | Supremora (FR); 1958 | Temora | Pharyva (Family: 9-e) |
