= 1974 Prix de l'Arc de Triomphe =

- Location: Longchamp Racecourse
- Date: October 6, 1974
- Winning horse: Allez France

The 1974 Prix de l'Arc de Triomphe was a horse race held at Longchamp on Sunday 6 October 1974. It was the 53rd running of the Prix de l'Arc de Triomphe.

The winner was Daniel Wildenstein's Allez France, an American-bred four-year-old filly trained in France by Angel Penna Sr. and ridden by Yves Saint-Martin. Saint-Martin had previously won the race on Sassafras in 1970 whilst Penna had trained San San to win in 1972. Allez France was the first of Wildenstein's four winners of the race.

== The contenders ==
In French racing, horses in the same ownership are usually "coupled" and treated as a single entry for betting purposes. The favourite for the race was the four-year-old filly Allez France, second in the race in 1973 and winner of numerous major prizes including the Critérium des Pouliches, Poule d'Essai des Pouliches, Prix de Diane, Prix d'Ispahan, Prix Vermeille and Prix Ganay. Allez France was coupled in the betting with Daniel Wildenstein's three-year-old filly Paulista, a four length winner of the Prix Vermeille on her previous start. Ten days before the race, Allez France's regular jockey Yves Saint-Martin sustained a serious leg injury and looked likely to be replaced by Lester Piggott, but announced himself fit to ride after undergoing pain-killing injections. Nelson Bunker Hunt was represented by the Mississipian, winner of the Grand Critérium and Prix Niel and by the stayer Busiris. The other French contenders included the Grand Prix de Paris winners Sagaro and Tennyson as well as Kamaraan, On My Way, Margouillat (Prix Dollar) and Comtesse de Loir, winner of the Prix Saint-Alary. A three-horse British entry was headed by Highclere who had won the 1000 Guineas and the Prix de Diane and also included the Eclipse Stakes winner Coup de Feu and the dual Goodwood Cup winner Proverb. Allez France/Paulista headed the betting at odds of 1/2, with Mississipian/Busiris on 6.5/1 and Sagaro (coupled with his pacemaker Valdo) at 9.25/1,

== The race ==
Valdo took the lead from the start and set the pace from Busiris, Coup de Feu, Riot in Paris, Margouillat, Sagaro, Paulista and Tennyson. Allez France was held up at the back of the field with only five horses, including Comtesse de Loir behind her. On the approach to the straight, Busiris took the lead from Valdo but was soon challenged by Riot in Paris and Tennyson as Allez France began to make rapid progress on the outside. Allez France took the lead and opened up a clear advantage with Margouillat, Kamaraan and Paulista also launching challenges. Allez France looked likely to record an easy victory until Comtesse de Loir emerged as a serious threat in the last 200 metres under a "whirlwind" ride from Jean-Claude Desaint. In a closely contested finish, Allez France prevailed by a head from Comtesse de Loir, with Margouillat three-quarters of a length away in third. There was a gap of four lengths back to Kamaraan, who beat Paulista by a length for fourth. Yves Saint-Martin admitted that he had probably taken Allez France to the front too soon.

== Race details ==
- Sponsor: none
- Purse: 1,412,000 ₣
- Going: Soft
- Distance: 2,400 metres
- Number of runners: 20
- Winner's time: 2:36.9

== Full result ==
Pos.	Marg.	Horse	Age	Jockey	Trainer (Country)
1		Allez France	4	Yves Saint-Martin	Angel Penna Sr. (FR)
2	hd	Comtesse de Loir	3	Jean-Claude Desaint	John Cunnington (FR)
3	¾	Margouillat	4	Georges Doleuze	R de Mony-Pajol (FR)
4	4	Kamaraan	3	Henri Samani	François Mathet (FR)
5	1	Paulista	3	Freddy Head	Angel Penna Sr. (FR)
6	3	Riboquill	3	Gerard Dubroeucq	John Cunnington (FR)
7	½	Card King	6	Alain Lequeux	Edouard Bartholomew (FR)
8	snk	On My Way	4	Gérard Rivases	N Pelat (FR)
9	1	Mississipian	3	Lester Piggott	Maurice Zilber (FR)
10	2½	Tennyson	4	Jimmy Lindley	Peter Head (FR)
11	2½	Sagaro	3	Philippe Paquet	François Boutin (FR)
12	2	Riot in Paris	3	Alfred Gibert	(FR)
13	7	Sang Bleu	5	J Taillard	(FR)
14	8	Proverb	4	Willie Carson	Barry Hills (GB)
15	hd	Recupere	4	Bill Pyers	G Delloye (FR)
16	2	Busiris	3	Geoff Lewis	Maurice Zilber (FR)
17	2	Un Kopeck	3	Maurice Philipperon	John Cunnington (FR)
18	½	Highclere	3	Joe Mercer	Dick Hern (GB)
19	2½	Coup de Feu	5	Pat Eddery	Duncan Sasse (GB)
20	dist	Valdo	3	G Thibouef	François Boutin (FR)

* Abbreviations: ns = nose; shd = short-head; hd = head; snk = short neck; nk = neck

== Winner's details ==
Further details of the winner, Allez France

- Sex: Filly
- Foaled: 1970
- Country: United States
- Sire: Sea-Bird; Dam: Priceless Gem (Hail To Reason)
- Owner: Daniel Wildenstein
- Breeder: Bieber-Jacobs Stable
