= Comtesse de Loir =

French-bred Thoroughbred racehorse

- Sire: Val de Loir
- Grandsire: Vieux Manoir
- Dam: Neriad
- Damsire: Princequillo
- Sex: Mare
- Foaled: 18 March 1971
- Country: France
- Colour: Bay
- Breeder: Souren Vanian
- Owner: George Ohrstrom
- Trainer: John Cunnington
- Record: 15:3-6-3

Major wins
- Prix Saint-Alary (1974)

Awards
- Timeform rating 117 (1973), 131 (1974), 130 (1975); Timeform top-rated three-year-old (1974); Top-rated French three-year-old (1974)

Comtesse de Loir (1971 – after 1993) was a French Thoroughbred racehorse and broodmare. In her three-year racing career, she won only one important race, the Prix Saint-Alary in 1974. but was placed in numerous major events including the Critérium des Pouliches, Prix de Diane, Prix Vermeille, Prix de l'Arc de Triomphe (twice), Prix Ganay, Canadian International Stakes and Washington, D.C. International. Her performance in the 1973 Arc, when she was beaten a head by Allez France, saw her rated the best three-year-old of either sex to race in Europe that year.

== Background ==
Comtesse de Loir was a "lightly-made, quite attractive" bay mare with no white markings bred in France by Souren Vanian. She was one of the best horses sired by Val de Loir who won the Prix du Jockey Club in 1962. Comtesse de Loir's dam Neriad won only one minor race in the United States, but became a highly influential broodmare, whose descendants included Miesque, Good Ba Ba, Kingmambo and East of the Moon.

As a yearling, the filly was offered for sale at Deauville and bought for ₣180,000by representatives of the American financier George Ohrstrom. She was sent into training with John Cunnington and ridden in all her major races by Jean-Claude Desaint.

== Racing career ==
=== 1973: two-year-old season ===
Comtesse de Loir began her career as a racehorse by winning a race for newcomers over 1600 metres at Longchamp Racecourse in September, beating Val Divine by one and a half lengths. On 7 October, the filly was moved up sharply in class to contest the Group One Critérium des Pouliches over the same course and distance. Ridden by Desaint she started at odds of 5.25/1 in a field of seventeen runners including challengers from Britain and Ireland. She had no chance with the winner Hippodamia but held on to take second ahead of La Tulipe and Polygamy.

=== 1974: three-year-old season ===
In her first two starts as a three-year-old, Comtesse de Loir finished fifth behind Paddy's Princess in the Prix de la Grotte over 1600 metres at Longchamp and third behind Rose Bed in the Prix Chloé over 1800 metres at Évry. The filly was moved up in distance for the Group One Prix Saint Alary over 2000 metres at Longchamp on 26 May. Ridden by Desaint, she started a 16/1 outsider against thirteen opponents including Hippodamia, La Tulipe, Paddy's Princess, Rose Bed, Dumka (winner of the Poule d'Essai des Pouliches) and Pale Ale (Prix Penelope). Comtesse de Loir was among the leaders from the start before taking the lead 400 metres from the finish (when she had "the race at her mercy") and went clear to win by two and a half lengths and three quarters of a length from Hippodamia and La Tulipe. Three weeks later, the filly started 9/2 favourite for the Prix de Diane over 2100 metres at Chantilly Racecourse. Hippodamia, La Tulipe, Paddy's Princess, Rose Bed and Dumka were again in opposition as well as the Irish 1000 Guineas winner Gaily, but her most serious rival in the betting was the British filly Highclere, the winner of the 1000 Guineas. Comtesse de Loir took a narrow lead 200 metres from the finish but was overtaken in the closing stages and finished second, two lengths behind Highclere, and half a length ahead of the 29/1 outsider Odisea.

After a summer break, Comtesse de Loir returned for the Group One Prix Vermeille over 2400 metres at Longchamp on 22 September in which she started second favourite behind Daniel Wildenstein's Paulista, a filly who had won the Prix Minerve, Prix de Psyché and Prix de la Nonette. Comtesse de Loir looked fit to run before the race and finished strongly but proved no match for Paulista and was beaten into second place by four lengths. Two weeks later, over the same course and distance, the filly started a 53/1 outsider for the 53rd running of France's most prestigious race, the Prix de l'Arc de Triomphe. Under a hard ride from Desaint, Comtesse de Loir produced a strong run in the straight to challenge the odds-on favourite Allez France in the last 100 metres. At the finishing post, Comtesse de Loir finished a head behind the older mare and clear of many notable performers including Paulista, Sagaro and Highclere. Timeform described her performance as "a revelation".

=== 1975: four-year-old season ===
On her first appearance of 1975, the four-year-old Comtesse de Loir finished third behind Allez France and Card King in the Prix Ganay at Longchamp on 4 May, with Hurry Harriet and Dahlia in fifth and sixth. She was then sent outside for France for the first time to contest the Coronation Cup at Epsom Downs Racecourse in June and finished fourth behind Bustino, Ashmore and Mil's Bomb. She returned to France and finished fourth behind Un Kopeck in the Grand Prix de Saint-Cloud, before recording her only success of the season in the Prix des Erables, a minor event over 2200 metres at Chantilly.

After a two-month break, Comtesse de Loir returned for a second attempt at the Arc de Triomphe, and started at odds of 21/1 in a twenty-four runner field. Held up by Desaint until the straight, she took the lead from Nobiliary 300 metres from the finish but was overtaken in the closing stages and finished third, beaten three lengths and two and a half lengths by Star Appeal and On My Way. As in the previous year, she had many top class horses behind her including Allez France, Dahlia, Bruni, Card King and Green Dancer. For her last two races, Comtesse de Loir was sent to compete in North America. In late October she ran in the Canadian International Stakes at Woodbine Racecourse in Toronto and finished second, beaten half a length by the 1974 Epsom Derby winner Snow Knight, who went on to be voted American Champion Male Turf Horse. The filly's last race was the Washington, D.C. International over one and a half miles at Laurel Park Racecourse in which she was opposed by Snow Knight, Dahlia, Nobiliary, Star Appeal and On My Way. Held up by Desaint in the early stages, he produced her usual strong run in the straight but failed to overhaul Nobiliary and finished second, beaten three quarters of a length.

== Assessment ==
There was no International Classification of European two-year-olds in 1973: the official handicappers of Britain, Ireland and France compiled separate rankings for horses which competed in those countries. In the French Free Handicap, Comtesse de Loir was rated the fourth best filly of the season, six pounds behind Hippodamia. The independent Timeform organisation gave her a rating of 117, thirteen pounds inferior to their top-rated two-year-old filly Hippodamia.

In 1974, Comtesse de Loir was given a rating of 131 by Timeform, making her their highest-rated three-year-old filly of the season, one pound ahead of Paulista and two ahead of Highclere and the joint-highest-rated three-year-old of either sex, the equal of the colts Sagaro, Nonoalco, Dankaro (Prix Lupin) and Caracolero (Prix du Jockey Club). In the official French handicap she was rated the best three-year-old of either sex, a pound ahead of Caracolero and Dankaro.

As a four-year-old, Comtesse de Loir was rated 130 by Timeform, three pounds behind their top-rated older female Lianga. In the official French handicap, she was rated the second-best older female, seven pounds behind Allez France, and a pound ahead of Dahlia. In their annual Racehorses of 1975, Timeform described her as a "very genuine and consistent" filly who "never got the big win that her admirable consistency deserved".

== Breeding record ==
Comtesse de Loir was retired from racing to become a broodmare at her owners stud in the United States. Between 1977 and 1993 she produced at least seven foals and three winners, by far the best of which was the filly Heron Cove. Her foals included:

- Noblesse de Loir, a chestnut filly, foaled in 1977, sired by Forli, won one race.
- Altesse de Loir, brown filly, 1978, by Vaguely Noble, failed to win.
- Kazatska, brown filly, 1979, by Nijinsky, unraced
- Heron Cove, bay filly, 1980, by Bold Bidder, won four races including the Long Island Handicap.
- Yggdrasil, bay filly, 1988, by Riverman, unraced.
- Bataan, bay colt, 1991, by Manila, won once from thirty-nine races.
- Tarkheena, bay filly, 1993, by Alleged, unraced.

== Pedigree ==
Pedigree of Comtesse de Loir (FR), bay mare, 1971
Sire Val de Loir (FR) 1959	Vieux Manoir (FR); 1947	Brantôme	Blandford
Sire Val de Loir (FR) 1959	Vieux Manoir (FR); 1947	Brantôme	Vitamine
Sire Val de Loir (FR) 1959	Vieux Manoir (FR); 1947	Vielle Maison	Fingals
Sire Val de Loir (FR) 1959	Vieux Manoir (FR); 1947	Vielle Maison	Vieille Canaille
Sire Val de Loir (FR) 1959	Vali (FR); 1954	Sunny Boy	Jock
Sire Val de Loir (FR) 1959	Vali (FR); 1954	Sunny Boy	Fille de Soleil
Sire Val de Loir (FR) 1959	Vali (FR); 1954	Her Slipper	Tetratema
Sire Val de Loir (FR) 1959	Vali (FR); 1954	Her Slipper	Carpet Slipper
Dam Neriad (FR) 1964	Princequillo (IRE); 1940	Prince Rose	Rose Prince
Dam Neriad (FR) 1964	Princequillo (IRE); 1940	Prince Rose	Indolence
Dam Neriad (FR) 1964	Princequillo (IRE); 1940	Cosquilla	Papyrus
Dam Neriad (FR) 1964	Princequillo (IRE); 1940	Cosquilla	Quick Thought
Dam Neriad (FR) 1964	Sea-Change (USA); 1954	Count Fleet	Reigh Count
Dam Neriad (FR) 1964	Sea-Change (USA); 1954	Count Fleet	Quickly
Dam Neriad (FR) 1964	Sea-Change (USA); 1954	Now What	Chance Play
Dam Neriad (FR) 1964	Sea-Change (USA); 1954	Now What	That's That (Family 20)
