= 1972 Prix de l'Arc de Triomphe =

- Location: Longchamp Racecourse
- Date: October 8, 1972
- Winning horse: San San

The 1972 Prix de l'Arc de Triomphe was a horse race held at Longchamp on Sunday 8 October 1972. It was the 51st running of the Prix de l'Arc de Triomphe.

The winner was Margit Batthyany's San San, an American-bred three-year-old filly trained in France by Angel Penna Sr. and ridden by Freddy Head. San San was the first filly to win the race since La Sorellina in 1953. Head had previously won the race on Bon Mot in 1966 whilst Batthyany and Penna were winning the race for the first time.

== The contenders ==
In French racing, horses in the same ownership are usually "coupled" and treated as a single entry for betting purposes. The favourite for the race was the three-year-old colt Hard To Beat, winner of the Grand Critérium, Prix Lupin, Prix du Jockey Club and Prix Niel. Next in the betting was the three-horse Nelson Bunker Hunt entry comprising Roberto (Epsom Derby, Benson and Hedges Gold Cup), Rescousse (Prix de Diane) and Pleben (Grand Prix de Paris). Apart from Roberto, Ireland was also represented by Boucher, the winner of the St Leger. The three British challengers were Erimo Hawk (Ascot Gold Cup), Parnell (Irish St Leger) and Steel Pulse (Irish Derby). Other international contenders were My Mourne from Spain and Mejiro Musashi from Japan. The other French-trained runners included Sharapour (Prix Dollar), San San (Prix Vermeille), Regal Exception (Irish Oaks), Mister Sic Top (Prix d'Ispahan) and Homeric.

Hard To Beat started at odds of 1.2/1 ahead of the Bunker Hunt entry on 4.5/1. Parnell was next in the betting on 9.5/1, with Boucher and Sharapour on 17/1 and San San on 18.5/1.

== The race ==
Roberto took the lead soon after the start and set an exceptionally fast pace from Regal Exception and the Argentinian-bred Snow Castle with the back markers in the early stages including My Mourne, Mejiro Musashi and San San. Entering the final turn, Roberto maintained a one length advantage over Regal Exception, followed in order by Snow Castle, Parnell, Sharapour, Boucher, Hard To Beat and Homeric as San San and Rescousse began to make progress from the rear of the field. In the straight Roberto and Regal Exception battled for the lead ahead of Homeric but San San was now making rapid headway on the outside. As Roberto dropped back and Regal Exception began to struggle the race looked to have devolved into a two-horse contest between San San and Homeric in the last 100 metres. San San got the better of Homeric and then held of the late challenge of Rescousse to win by one and a half lengths and half a length. Regal Exception held on to take fourth ahead of the 84/1 outsider Card King and Sharapour. Roberto faded into seventh, but was still the first three-year-old to cross the line, a length in front of Hard To Beat.

== Race details ==
- Sponsor: none
- Purse:
- Going: Firm
- Distance: 2,400 metres
- Number of runners: 19
- Winner's time: 2:38.3

== Full result ==
| Pos. | Marg. | Horse | Age | Jockey | Trainer (Country) |
|---|---|---|---|---|---|
| 1 | | San San | 3 | Freddy Head | Angel Penna Sr. (FR) |
| 2 | 1½ | Rescousse | 3 | Yves Saint-Martin | Geoffroy Watson (FR) |
| 3 | ½ | Homeric | 4 | Maurice Philipperon | John Cunnington (FR) |
| 4 | 1½ | Regal Exception | 3 | Joe Mercer | John Fellows (FR) |
| 5 | ½ | Card King | 4 | Jimmy Lindley | Edouard Bartholomew (FR) |
| 6 | ½ | Sharapour | 4 | Bill Pyers | François Mathet (FR) |
| 7 | 1½ | Roberto | 3 | Braulio Baeza | Vincent O'Brien (IRE) |
| 8 | 1½ | Hard To Beat | 3 | Lester Piggott | Robert Carver (FR) |
| 9 | 1½ | Parnell | 4 | Willie Carson | Bernard van Cutsem (GB) |
| 10 | hd | Mister Sic Top | 5 | Henri Samani | Gilbert Pézeril (FR) |
| 10 | dh | Pleben | 3 | Maurice Depalmas | Geoffroy Watson (FR) |
| 12 | 2 | Erimo Hawk | 4 | Pat Eddery | Geoffrey Barling (GB) |
| 13 | nk | Boucher | 3 | Laffit Pincay | Vincent O'Brien (IRE) |
| 14 | 1 | Steel Pulse | 3 | Willie Carson | Scobie Breasley (GB) |
| 15 | 2 | Sancy | 3 | Jean-Claude Desaint | S Boullenger (FR) |
| 16 | 1 | My Mourne | 3 | J-A Borrego | Fulgencio di Diego (SPA) |
| 17 | 6 | Toujours Pret | 3 | J Taillard | Bernard Secly (FR) |
| 18 | | Mejiro Musashi | 5 | Yuji Nohiro | Sueshi Okubo (JPN) |
| 19 | | Snow Castle | 4 | G Thiboeuf | Roger Poincelet (FR) |

- Abbreviations: ns = nose; shd = short-head; hd = head; snk = short neck; nk = neck

== Winner's details ==
Further details of the winner, San San

- Sex: Filly
- Foaled: 1969
- Country: United States
- Sire: Bald Eagle; Dam: Sail Navy (Princequillo)
- Owner: Margit Batthyany
- Breeder: Harry F. Guggenheim
