= Val de l'Orne =

French-bred Thoroughbred racehorse

- Sire: Val de Loir
- Grandsire: Vieux Manoir
- Dam: Aglae
- Damsire: Armistice
- Sex: Stallion
- Foaled: 1972
- Country: France
- Colour: Bay
- Breeder: W. Stora
- Owner: Jacques Wertheimer
- Trainer: Alec Head
- Record: 5:4-1-0

Major wins
- Prix Noailles (1975); Prix Hocquart (1975); Prix du Jockey Club (1975)

Awards
- Timeform rating 129 (1974), 130 (1975); Top-rated French three-year-old (1975)

Val de l'Orne (1972–1993) was a French Thoroughbred racehorse and sire. He won four of his five races between September 1974 and June 1975 before his racing career was ended by injury. In 1974 he won on his debut and then finished second in the Group One Grand Critérium. In the following year he was undefeated, winning the Prix Noailles and the Prix Hocquart before recording his most important success in the Prix du Jockey Club. He did not race again, but became a successful breeding stallion.

== Background ==
Val de l'Orne was a bay horse with no white markings bred in France by W. Stora. He was one of the best horses sired by Val de Loir who won the Prix du Jockey Club in 1962. Val de l'Orne was the first foal of Aglae, a mare who finished fourth in the Prix de Diane and came from a very successful family: her dam Aglae Grace won the Prix de Diane, produced the Prix de l'Arc de Triomphe winner Soltikoff, and was the ancestor of the Poule d'Essai des Poulains winners Red Lord and No Pass No Sale.

In 1974, Val de l'Orne was offered for sale and was bought by representatives of the French businessman Jacques Wertheimer. The price of ₣360,000 was the highest price paid for a yearling colt at auction in France that year. The colt was sent into training with Alec Head and was ridden in most of his races by his trainer's son Freddy Head.

== Racing career ==
=== 1974: two-year-old season ===
Val de l'Orne was kept off the racecourse by several training setbacks, including a serious respiratory infection before making his debut in a race over 1600 metres at Longchamp Racecourse in September. He disputed the lead from the start before drawing away in the straight to win by three lengths from Blue Vermillion, Tiepolino and Easy Regent. The form of the race was subsequently boosted when Easy Regent won the Critérium de Saint-Cloud. The colt was then moved up sharply in class for France's most prestigious race for two-year-olds, the Grand Critérium over 1600 metres at Longchamp on 13 October and started the 9/2 fourth choice in the betting. After being settled in fifth place by Freddy Head he moved up to take the lead 400 metres from the finish but was overtaken in the closing stages and finished second, two lengths behind the winner Mariacci. Alec Head commented that if anyone had told him in August that Val de l'Orne would finish second in the Grand Critérium he would have thought them "crazy".

=== 1975: three-year-old season ===
Val de l'Orne began his three-year-old season in the Prix Noailles over 2100 metres at Longchamp on 27 April. Starting at odds of 1.6/1 in a seven-runner field he defeated the odds-on favourite Top Gear by three-quarters of a length without Head having to use his whip. Two weeks later, started 11/10 favourite for the Prix Hocquart against eight opponent including Top Gear and Easy Regent. Racing on soft ground he won "effortlessly" by two lengths from Top Gear who was in turn two and a half lengths clear of the remainder.

On 8 June, Val de l'Orne started 4/5 favourite for the Grand Prix du Jockey Club over 2400 metres at Chantilly Racecourse. His eleven opponents included Mariacci, Top Gear, Easy Regent from France as well as Patch, an ex-Italian colt who had been transferred to England and won the Lingfield Derby Trial by ten lengths. Head settled the colt towards the rear of the field before moving up to dispute third place early in the straight. Patch had taken the lead and looked the likely winner but Val de l'Orne began to make rapid progress and was only a length behind 200 metres out. In the closing stages Val de l'Orne gradually wore down the British challenger and won by a head. It was subsequently revealed that the winner had sustained a serious shoulder injury, which Freddy Head believed had occurred before the turn into the straight. The injury did not respond to treatment and Val de l'Orne did not race again.

== Assessment ==
There was no International Classification of European two-year-olds in 1974: the official handicappers of Britain, Ireland and France compiled separate rankings for horses which competed in those countries. In the French Free Handicap, Val de l'Orne was rated the fourth best two-year-old of the year, behind Mariacci, Green Dancer and the filly Broadway Dancer. The independent Timeform organisation awarded him a rating of 129, five pounds inferior to their top-rated two-year-old colt Grundy. In the following year he was rated 130 by Timeform, seven pounds behind their Horse of Year Grundy. In their annual Racehorses of 1975 the organisation commented that Val de l'Orne's early retirement, and the fact that he had never been tested against older horses made him difficult to assess. In the official French handicap he was the highest-rated three-year-old of the season ahead of Patch and Ivanjica.

== Stud record ==
Val de l'Orne was retired to the Head family's Haras d'Etreham near Bayeux in Normandy and was later transferred to stand at the Windfields Farm in North America.

He was a successful breeding stallion whose best winners included Pay The Butler (Japan Cup), Golden Choice (Queen's Plate), La Lorgnette (Queen's Plate), Val Dansant (Prince of Wales Stakes), Victory Zone (Hollywood Derby), Valuable Witness (Goodwood Cup), River God (Queen's Vase), Alice Springs (All Along Stakes), Baron de Vaux (Woodlawn Stakes), Ruscelli (Prix de La Jonchere) and Truculent (Prix La Force).

== Sire line tree ==
- Val de l'Orne
  - Ruscelli
  - Victory Zone
  - Valuable Witness
  - Truculent
    - Latmos
  - Val Dansant
    - Dorset Downs
  - Golden Choice
  - Pay the Butler
  - Baron de Vaux
  - River God

== Pedigree ==
Pedigree of Val de l'Orne (FR), bay stallion, 1972
Sire Val de Loir (FR) 1959	Vieux Manoir (FR); 1947	Brantôme	Blandford
Sire Val de Loir (FR) 1959	Vieux Manoir (FR); 1947	Brantôme	Vitamine
Sire Val de Loir (FR) 1959	Vieux Manoir (FR); 1947	Vielle Maison	Fingals
Sire Val de Loir (FR) 1959	Vieux Manoir (FR); 1947	Vielle Maison	Vieille Canaille
Sire Val de Loir (FR) 1959	Vali (FR); 1954	Sunny Boy	Jock
Sire Val de Loir (FR) 1959	Vali (FR); 1954	Sunny Boy	Fille de Soleil
Sire Val de Loir (FR) 1959	Vali (FR); 1954	Her Slipper	Tetratema
Sire Val de Loir (FR) 1959	Vali (FR); 1954	Her Slipper	Carpet Slipper
Dam Aglae (FR) 1965	Armistice (FR); 1959	Worden	Wild Risk
Dam Aglae (FR) 1965	Armistice (FR); 1959	Worden	San Tares
Dam Aglae (FR) 1965	Armistice (FR); 1959	Commemoration	Vandale
Dam Aglae (FR) 1965	Armistice (FR); 1959	Commemoration	Anne Comnene
Dam Aglae (FR) 1965	Aglae Grace (FR); 1947	Mousson	Rose Prince
Dam Aglae (FR) 1965	Aglae Grace (FR); 1947	Mousson	Spring Tide
Dam Aglae (FR) 1965	Aglae Grace (FR); 1947	Agathe	Amfortas
Dam Aglae (FR) 1965	Aglae Grace (FR); 1947	Agathe	Melanie (Family 11-e)
