= Faroe Islands Women's Volleyball League =

Annual volleyball competition

Faroese Women's Volleyball League
- Current season, competition or edition: 2022–23
- Sport: Volleyball
- Founded: 1969
- First season: 1969
- No. of teams: 6 Teams
- Country: Faroe Islands
- Continent: Europe
- Domestic cups: Faroese Cup; Faroese Super Cup
- International cups: CEV Champions League; CEV Cup; CEV Challenge Cup
- Website: http://www.fbf.fo

The Faroese Women's Volleyball Championship is an annual competition of the Faroese women's volleyball teams. It has been held since 1969. The Competitions are held in three divisions - Premier League, Division 1 and Division 2. The championships are organised by the Faroese Volleyball Union.

== Formula of the competition ==
The 2021/22 Premier League championship was held in two stages - preliminary and final. In the preliminary stage the teams played in 3 rounds. The top two teams advanced to the final and in a series of two matches to determine the champion. In case of a tie, a "golden" set was provided. For victories 3-0 and 3-1 teams get 3 points, for winning 3-2 - 2 points, for defeat 2-3 - 1 point, for defeats 1:3 and 0-3 no points are awarded. Six teams participated in the 2021/22 Premier League Championship: "Flair" (Torshavn), SI (Sørvagur), "Drottur" (Midvagur), KIF (Kollafjörður), TB (Tvörojri), Mjölnir (Klaksvik). Flair won the championship title, beating SI 1-1 (3-2, 1–3) in the final series, the "gold" set 15–12. Third place went to Drottour.

== Winners list ==
Years	Champions	Runners-up	Third place
1st Division (1. deild)
1969	NFL		
1970	NFL		
1971	Neistin Tórshavn		
1972	Neistin Tórshavn		
1973	Neistin Tórshavn		
1974	Neistin Tórshavn		
1975	NFL		
1976	Miðvágs Bóltfelag (MB)		
1977	Miðvágs Bóltfelag (MB)		
1978	Miðvágs Bóltfelag (MB)		
1979	SÍF Sandavágur		
1980	SÍF Sandavágur		
1981	Mjølnir Klaksvík		
1982	Mjølnir Klaksvík		
1983	Mjølnir Klaksvík		
1984	Mjølnir Klaksvík		
1985	Mjølnir Klaksvík		
The Champions League (Meistaradeildin)
1986	Mjølnir Klaksvík		
1987	Mjølnir Klaksvík		
1988	Mjølnir Klaksvík		
1989	Fleyr Tórshavn		
1990	Fleyr Tórshavn		
1991	Fleyr Tórshavn		
1992	Mjølnir Klaksvík		
1993	Mjølnir Klaksvík		
1994	Fleyr Tórshavn		
1995	Fleyr Tórshavn		
1996	Mjølnir Klaksvík		
1997	Fleyr Tórshavn		
1998	Mjølnir Klaksvík		
1999	Mjølnir Klaksvík		
2000	Mjølnir Klaksvík		
2001	Dráttur		
2002	TB Tvøroyri		
2003	ÍF Fuglafjørður		
2004	Mjølnir Klaksvík		
2005	Mjølnir Klaksvík		
2006	Dráttur		
2007	ÍF Fuglafjørður		
2008	SÍ Sørvagur		
Eik-ligan
2009	SÍ Sørvagur		
2010	SÍ Sørvagur	TB Tvøroyri	
2011	Mjølnir Klaksvík		
2012	Mjølnir Klaksvík		
2013	Mjølnir Klaksvík		
2014	Mjølnir Klaksvík		
2015	TB Tvøroyri		
2016	Dráttur Vágunum	Fleyr Tórshavn	SÍ Sørvagur
2017	Dráttur Vágunum	KÍF Kollafirði	
2018	Fleyr Tórshavn	KÍF Kollafirði	
2019	Fleyr Tórshavn	SÍ Sørvágur	
2020	Mjølnir Klaksvík		
