= Pay the Butler =

American-bred Thoroughbred racehorse

- Pay the Butler, ridden by Chris McCarron, shortly after their victory at the 1988 Japan Cup
- Sire: Val de l'Orne
- Grandsire: Val de Loir
- Dam: Princess Morvi
- Damsire: Graustark
- Sex: Stallion
- Foaled: February 20, 1984; Kentucky, U.S.
- Died: July 1, 1991 (aged 7); Japan
- Country: United States
- Colour: Bay
- Breeder: Clovelly Farm
- Owner: Edmund A. Gann; Koichiro Hayata
- Trainer: John Fellows France; Robert J. Frankel USA
- Record: 40: 5–5–5
- Earnings: $1,934,140 (equivalent to $4,570,000 in 2025)

Major wins
- Red Smith Handicap (1988); Japan Cup (1988)

Honours
- Pay the Butler Stakes (2011)

Pay the Butler (February 20, 1984 – July 1, 1991) was an American Thoroughbred racehorse who was best known for winning the 1988 Japan Cup. Bred at Clovelly Farm, Kentucky, he began his racing career in France, achieving mixed results and winning only 2 of his 17 races. Upon returning to the United States as a four-year-old, he won the Red Smith Handicap in his North American debut.

The highlight of Pay the Butler's career came in November 1988, when he defeated a strong field of international racers, including Tony Bin and Oguri Cap, at the annual invitational Japan Cup at Tokyo Racecourse in an upset victory. This was Pay the Butler's sole Grade I (GI) victory, and came with a winner's purse of over a million dollars. He remained in training for two further seasons and ran in several major GI contests, including the following year's Japan Cup and Arlington Million, but his performances were inconsistent and he recorded only one further minor win. He was retired to stud in Japan in 1991 but was euthanized following a ruptured ligament after producing one crop of foals.

== Background ==
Pay the Butler was a bay horse bred in Kentucky by Robin Scully's Clovelly Farm. He was sired by the French stallion Val de l'Orne who won the Prix du Jockey Club in 1975, whose other progeny included the Queen's Plate winners Golden Choice and La Lorgnette as well as the Hollywood Derby winner Victory Zone. In contrast, his dam, Princess Morvi, never raced, but was a descendant of the influential French broodmare L'Esperance. Pay the Butler was the first of several foals Val de l'Orne and Princess Morvi produced, including River God, who won the 1990 Queen's Vase and finished third in the St Leger Stakes.

As a yearling, the colt was offered for sale at Keeneland in September 1985 at a reserve price of $20,000. While described by Clovelly Farm's manager, Lars la Cour, as a "good looking horse", Pay the Butler failed to receive a single bid, and the decision was made to send him to France for training. During his initial training Pay the Butler was regarded as a difficult horse, La Cour later describing him as "a big, lazy horse." He was named after another horse seen by his trainer in France, John Fellows, during a trip he took to Australia. As both horses would be based on opposite sides of the globe, Fellows adopted the name in full for his horse back in France. (Note: The Australian Pay the Butler, born in 1979, ultimately never raced.)

== Racing career ==
=== France ===
As a two-year-old, Pay the Butler raced in France and failed to win in five races although he finished third in the Listed Prix Herbager at Maisons-Laffitte Racecourse. In the following year was unplaced in eight of his nine races but recorded his first victory when he won the Listed Grand Prix de Strasbourg on May 28. In the early part of 1988, Pay the Butler raced three times in France, winning a handicap race at Longchamp Racecourse on April 4 and was then sent to the United States to be trained by Robert J. Frankel.

=== United States ===
Pay the Butler proved highly quarrelsome upon his arrival in the United States, his temperament such that it required five men to saddle him for his American debut in the Red Smith Handicap on May 28, a Grade II race ran over ten furlongs at Belmont Park. Nevertheless, it was here that Pay the Butler won his first graded race, winning by a neck over Equalize after a strong charge in the final stretch of the race; a victory that resulted in the then-largest pick-six payoff in New York racing history at $500,000 (equivalent to $1,361,000 in 2025). He continued to run well in the United States, finishing second in both the Bowling Green Handicap and the Man o' War Stakes. However, his race at the Grade I Rothmans International at Woodbine Racetrack in Canada ended in disappointment, finishing ninth out of fifteen runners. Frankel later attributed the poor result to a late jockey change; Pay the Butler's regular rider, Robbie Davis, had withdrawn following a fatal trampling accident at Belmont Park three days prior in which jockey Mike Venezia was killed, requiring a replacement by Larry Attard.

==== Japan Cup ====
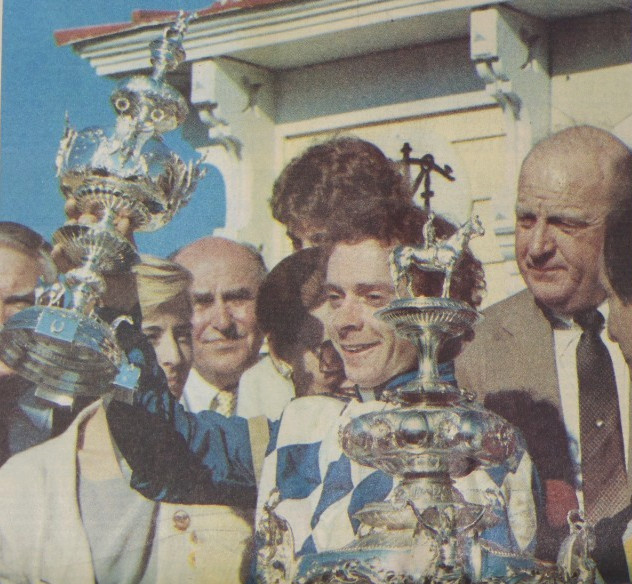
Chris McCarron, Pay the Butler's jockey in his two Japan Cup races

Pay the Butler was sent to Japan to contest the eighth running of the Japan Cup at Tokyo Racecourse on November and started at odds of 13.9/1 in a fourteen-runner field. He was a last minute entrant, only receiving an invite the day before he would have to travel over. There was a strong European contingent comprising Tony Bin from Italy, Moon Madness and Shady Heights (International Stakes) from Britain and Kondor (Preis von Europa, Aral-Pokal) from Germany. The other North American contenders were Salem Drive (Gulfstream Park Turf Handicap) and My Big Boy (Bernard Baruch Handicap) whilst the Southern hemisphere was represented by the New Zealand-bred gelding Bonecrusher. The best of the "home team" appeared to be Tamamo Cross, who started favourite after wins in the Takarazuka Kinen and the Tenno Sho and the three-year-old Oguri Cap. As Davis was still unable to race, Pay the Butler was ridden by Chris McCarron, who had not been to Japan before. He prepared extensively for the race, watching every available tape of the previous races held at Tokyo Racecourse "16 times each". Among them was the year's autumn Tennō Shō, after which McCarron allegedly remarked that "the enemy is the two gray Japanese horses, Oguri Cap and Tamamo Cross".

External videos
- Official 1988 Japan Cup race footage

Pay the Butler stayed in the middle of the pack for most of the race, before making a surge at the third corner. In the homestretch McCarron made the unusual decision to urge Pay the Butler towards the inner rail rather than continue running straight, not wishing to run alongside Tamamo Cross and trigger the horse's competitive nature. The plan worked; Pay the Butler won by half a length from Tamamo Cross with Oguri Cap taking third, earning $1,033,000 (equivalent to $2,810,000 in 2025) in a result widely seen as a major upset. Frankel, now having won the Japan Cup on his third attempt, later described Pay the Butler's victory as his greatest thrill in his career. Through their victory, McCarron also won his eighteenth Grade 1 race of the year, the most of any American jockey, and was the first jockey to win five separate races worth one million dollars or more in one year.

=== Later career ===
On his final appearance of 1988, Pay the Butler finished sixth behind the Breeders' Cup Turf winner Great Communicator in the Hollywood Turf Cup Stakes at Hollywood Park Racetrack on December 24.

Pay the Butler failed to win in nine starts as a five-year-old in 1989 but ran well in several major turf races, with the exception of the Arlington Million, having been a last minute replacement in the race; Frankel later attributed the loss to the soft ground surface of the track. He finished second in the Pan American Handicap and the Oak Tree Invitational Stakes, where he was beaten by four lengths by Hawkster, who set a world-record time of 2:22.8 for 1 1/2 miles. He also ran third in the John Henry Handicap and the Bowling Green Handicap.

External videos
- Official 1989 Japan Cup race footage

On Pay the Butler's final start of the year he attempted to repeat his 1988 success in the Japan Cup. Shortly before the race, Pay the Butler was purchased from Gann by Koichiro Hayata, owner of the breeding stable Hayata Farms. He was again ridden by McCarron. Although Pay the Butler finished ahead of Hawkster and recorded a time faster than Hawkster's world record, it was not enough to win; Pay the Butler finished third by three lengths behind Oguri Cap and the New Zealander horse Horlicks. He earned approximately $241,429 for his placing; despite not winning any of his races in the year, Pay the Butler's annual purse winnings for the year was nearly $509,000.

Pay the Butler began his 1990 campaign by winning an allowance race at Hollywood Park in May but failed to make any impact in five subsequent races. On his final appearance he finished fourth in an allowance at Hollywood in November.

== Stud record and death ==
Some time after his final race, Pay the Butler was retired from racing to become a breeding stallion in Japan. However, during his first season, on July 1, 1991, he was euthanized after suffering from a ruptured ligament following a fall at the farm he was standing at. Pay the Butler was buried in Yushun Memorial Park in Niikappu, Hokkaido.

In total, Pay the Butler mated with 53 mares and produced 43 foals, earning a total of ¥489,815,000 (equivalent to ¥574,100,000 in 2024). The racing results for his progeny were modest, with most of his foals racing at an ungraded level or for only a few runs. Of them, the only horse to win a graded race was Pal Bright, a mare who won the GIII Niigata Kinen in 1997 and the GIII Hakodate Kinen in 1998.

== Legacy ==
Following his victory with Pay the Butler in Japan, Chris McCarron was invited to attend an event hosted by one of the JRA's training schools. Struck by learning that the school's racing program allowed students to work directly with Thoroughbred horses, he realized there was not an equivalent of this in the United States. This revelation stayed with him until his retirement from active jockeying in 2004, leading to his eventual founding of the North American Racing Academy, the only college program in the United Status for jockeys, in 2006.

Pay the Butler's race and subsequent victory at the Japan Cup is depicted in the manga and anime Umamusume: Cinderella Gray, a series that chronicles the racing career of Oguri Cap through anthropomorphized versions of the racehorses he raced against in the late 1980s and early 1990s. While often the series directly uses the real life names of the racehorses, Pay the Butler's stand-in was named Obey Your Master due to permission issues. The series directly replicates several of the Cup's events through this character, such as McCarron's studying of previous tapes of Tokyo Racecourse and Pay the Butler's last-minute dart away from Tamamo Cross in the race's homestretch. The character of Obey Your Master is voiced by Shizuka Ishigami.

On November 19, 2011, the Aqueduct Race Track in Queens, New York City, ran the Pay the Butler Stakes, a 1 1/16 mile race for 3 year olds and up with ten entrants and carrying a prize of $60,000 (equivalent to $86,000 in 2025). It was won by Kindergarden Kid, who defeated Sal the Barber by a neck.

== Race record ==
Pay the Butler's race record
| Date | Race | Grade | Distance* | Track | Field | Finish | Margin | Jockey | Ref |
|---|---|---|---|---|---|---|---|---|---|
| Aug 20, 1986 | Prix de Crevecoeur | Maiden | 1,600m | Deauville | 6 | 4 | 5 1/2 lengths | Gary-Williams Moore | |
| Oct 10, 1986 | Prix Herbager | Listed Stakes | 1,700m | Maisons-Laffitte | 7 | 3 | Head | Eric Saint-Martin | |
| Oct 19, 1986 | Prix du Louvre | | 1,600m | Longchamp | 8 | 3 | 3/4 lengths | Eric Saint-Martin | |
| Nov 7, 1986 | Prix Mieuxce | | 1,600m | Saint-Cloud | 18 | 4 | 5 lengths | Guy Guignard | |
| Nov 29, 1986 | Prix Victrix | | 1,600m | Saint-Cloud | 15 | 4 | 3 lengths | Guy Guignard | |
| Mar 27, 1987 | Prix Clamart | | 1,600m | Maisons-Laffitte | 11 | 6 | 11 lengths | Gary-Williams Moore | |
| Apr 21, 1987 | Prix Flying Fox | | 1,600m | Maisons-Laffitte | 16 | 8 | Distance | Guy Guignard | |
| May 13, 1987 | Prix de Nanterre | | 2,000m | Longchamp | 11 | 10 | Distance | Alfred Gibert | |
| May 28, 1987 | Grand Prix de Strasbourg | Listed Stakes | 2,100m | Strasbourg | 11 | 1 | (4 lengths) | Laurent Chaille | |
| Jun 20, 1987 | Prix Souverain | Listed Stakes | 2,000m | Saint-Cloud | 7 | 7 | Distance | Laurent Chaille | |
| Jul 19, 1987 | Hessen-Pokal | II | 2,000m | Frankfurt | 13 | 9 | Unrecorded | Laurent Chaille | |
| Aug 2, 1987 | Prix de la Ville de Trouville-sur-Mer | Listed Stakes | 2,000m | Deauville | 8 | 8 | Distance | Gary-Williams Moore | |
| Aug 23, 1987 | Prix de Triquerville | | 2,300m | Saint-Malo | 7 | 4 | 1 length | Laurent Chaille | |
| Oct 2, 1987 | Prix Niceas | Listed Stakes | 1,800m | Maisons-Laffitte | 10 | 5 | 4 3/4 lengths | Antony-Steven Cruz | |
| Mar 12, 1988 | Prix R.T.L (Becheville Prize) | Handicap | 2,100m | Saint-Cloud | 21 | 4 | 1 1/2 lengths | Dominique Boeuf | |
| Apr 4, 1988 | Prix de Plaisance | Handicap | 2,400m | Longchamp | 20 | 1 | (2 lengths) | Dominique Boeuf | |
| Apr 17, 1988 | Prix d'Hedouville | III | 2,400m | Longchamp | 10 | 5 | 3.5 lengths | Dominique Boeuf | |
| May 28, 1988 | Red Smith Handicap | II | 1 1/4 mi | Belmont Park | 14 | 1 | (Neck) | Robbie Davis | |
| Jun 18, 1988 | Bowling Green Handicap | I | 1 3/8 mi | Belmont Park | 13 | 2 | Neck | Robbie Davis | |
| Sep 5, 1988 | Del Mar Handicap | II | 6 furlongs | Del Mar | 11 | 6 | 5 lengths | Russell Baze | |
| Sep 24, 1988 | Man O' War Stakes | I | 1 3/8 mi | Belmont Park | 9 | 2 | 1/2 length | Robbie Davis | |
| Oct 9, 1988 | Turf Classic | I | 1 1/2 mi | Belmont Park | 9 | 5 | 7 lengths | Robbie Davis | |
| Oct 16, 1988 | Rothmans International Stakes | I | 1 1/2 mi | Woodbine | 15 | 9 | 9 1/4 lengths | Larry Attard | |
| Nov 27, 1988 | Japan Cup | I | 2,400m | Tokyo | 14 | 1 | (1/2 length) | Chris McCarron | |
| Dec 24, 1988 | Hollywood Turf Cup Handicap | I | 1 1/2 mi | Hollywood Park | 10 | 6 | 15 lengths | Chris McCarron | |
| Mar 7, 1989 | Pan American Handicap | I | 1 1/2 mi | Gulfstream Park | 8 | 2 | 11 lengths | Chris McCarron | |
| Mar 25, 1989 | San Luis Rey Stakes | I | 1 1/2 mi | Santa Anita | 5 | 4 | 26 1/2 lengths | Chris McCarron | |
| May 14, 1989 | John Henry Handicap | I | 1 1/8 mi | Hollywood Park | 8 | 3 | 1 1/4 lengths | Chris McCarron | |
| May 29, 1989 | Hollywood Turf Handicap | I | 1 1/4 mi | Hollywood Park | 9 | 5 | 1 3/4 lengths | Chris McCarron | |
| Jun 18, 1989 | Bowling Green Handicap | I | 1 3/8 mi | Belmont Park | 10 | 3 | 1 3/4 lengths | Robbie Davis | |
| Sep 3, 1989 | Arlington Million | I | 1 1/4 mi | Arlington | 13 | 12 | 22 1/2 lengths | Robbie Davis | |
| Sep 23, 1989 | Louisiana Downs Handicap, First Division | II | 1 3/8 mi | Louisiana Downs | 9 | 2 | 3 1/2 lengths | Robbie Davis | |
| Oct 14, 1989 | Oak Tree Invitational Handicap | I | 1 1/2 mi | Santa Anita | 9 | 2 | 4 lengths | Gary Stevens | |
| Nov 26, 1989 | Japan Cup | I | 2,400m | Tokyo | 15 | 3 | 3 lengths | Chris McCarron | |
| May 3, 1990 | Allowance race | | 1 1/8 mi | Hollywood Park | 5 | 1 | (1/2 length) | Robbie Davis | |
| May 28, 1990 | Hollywood Turf Handicap | I | 1 1/4 mi | Hollywood Park | 6 | 6 | 12 lengths | Eddie Delahoussaye | |
| Jun 16, 1990 | Golden Gate Handicap | II | 1 1/4 mi | Golden Gate | 11 | 10 | 10 1/4 lengths | Eddie Delahoussaye | |
| Oct 6, 1990 | Oak Tree Invitational Handicap | I | 1 1/2 mi | Santa Anita | 11 | 8 | 7 lengths | Robbie Davis | |
| Oct 17, 1990 | Henry P. Russell Handicap | | 1 1/4 mi | Santa Anita | 8 | 5 | 5 lengths | Robbie Davis | |
| Nov 12, 1990 | Allowance race | | 1 1/8 mi | Hollywood Park | 8 | 4 | 3 lengths | Robbie Davis | |

* Conversion of race distances
| Meters | Miles | Furlongs |
|---|---|---|
| 1,207 | 0.75 | 6 |
| 1,600 | 0.99 | 7.95 |
| 1,700 | 1.06 | 8.45 |
| 1,800 | 1.12 | 8.95 |
| 1,811 | 1 1/8 | 9 |
| 2,000 | 1.24 | 9.94 |
| 2,011 | 1 1/4 | 10 |
| 2,100 | 1.3 | 10.44 |
| 2,213 | 1 3/8 | 11 |
| 2,300 | 1.43 | 11.43 |
| 2,400 | 1.49 | 11.93 |
| 2,414 | 1 1/2 | 12 |

== Pedigree ==
Pedigree of Pay the Butler, bay stallion, family: 9-e
| Sire Val de l'Orne (FR) 1972 | Val de Loir (FR); 1959 | Vieux Manoir | Brantome |
| Sire Val de l'Orne (FR) 1972 | Val de Loir (FR); 1959 | Vieux Manoir | Vieille Maison |
| Sire Val de l'Orne (FR) 1972 | Val de Loir (FR); 1959 | Vali | Sunny Boy |
| Sire Val de l'Orne (FR) 1972 | Val de Loir (FR); 1959 | Vali | Her Slipper |
| Sire Val de l'Orne (FR) 1972 | Aglae (FR); 1965 | Armistice | Worden |
| Sire Val de l'Orne (FR) 1972 | Aglae (FR); 1965 | Armistice | Commemoration |
| Sire Val de l'Orne (FR) 1972 | Aglae (FR); 1965 | Aglae Grace | Mousson |
| Sire Val de l'Orne (FR) 1972 | Aglae (FR); 1965 | Aglae Grace | Agathe |
| Dam Princess Morvi (USA) 1975 | Graustark (USA); 1963 | Ribot | Tenerani |
| Dam Princess Morvi (USA) 1975 | Graustark (USA); 1963 | Ribot | Romanella |
| Dam Princess Morvi (USA) 1975 | Graustark (USA); 1963 | Flower Bowl | Alibhai |
| Dam Princess Morvi (USA) 1975 | Graustark (USA); 1963 | Flower Bowl | Flower Bed |
| Dam Princess Morvi (USA) 1975 | Silani (FR); 1965 | Silnet | Fastnet |
| Dam Princess Morvi (USA) 1975 | Silani (FR); 1965 | Silnet | Silver Jill |
| Dam Princess Morvi (USA) 1975 | Silani (FR); 1965 | Anabara | Arbar |
| Dam Princess Morvi (USA) 1975 | Silani (FR); 1965 | Anabara | Flying Carpet |
