= 1972 in ice hockey =

The following is a chronicle of events during the year 1972 in ice hockey.

== National Hockey League ==
- Art Ross Trophy as the NHL's leading scorer during the regular season: Phil Esposito ]
- Hart Memorial Trophy: for the NHL's Most Valuable Player: Bobby Orr
- Stanley Cup - The Boston Bruins defeated the New York Rangers in the 1972 Stanley Cup Finals
- With the first overall pick in the 1972 NHL Amateur Draft, the expansion New York Islanders selected Billy Harris.
- With the first overall pick in the 1972 NHL Expansion Draft, the Atlanta Flames selected goaltender Phil Myre.

== Canadian Hockey League ==
- Ontario Hockey League: J. Ross Robertson Cup.
- Quebec Major Junior Hockey League: won President's Cup (QMJHL) for the first time in team history
- Western Hockey League: President's Cup (WHL) for the first time in team history
- Memorial Cup:

== Minor League hockey ==
- AHL: Calder Cup
- IHL: Turner Cup.

== University hockey ==
NCAA Division I Men's Ice Hockey Tournament

== Season articles ==
1971–72 NHL season	1972–73 NHL season
1971–72 AHL season	1972–73 AHL season

== See also ==
- 1972 in sports
