= Allez France =

American-bred, French-trained Thoroughbred racehorse

- Racing silks of Daniel Wildenstein
- Sire: Sea-Bird
- Grandsire: Dan Cupid
- Dam: Priceless Gem
- Damsire: Hail To Reason
- Sex: Mare
- Foaled: 24 May 1970; Kentucky
- Died: 11 December 1989; Kentucky
- Country: United States
- Colour: Bay
- Breeder: Bieber-Jacobs Stable
- Owner: Daniel Wildenstein
- Trainer: Albert Klimscha; Angel Penna, Sr. (at age 4)
- Jockey: Yves Saint-Martin
- Record: 21: 13-3-1
- Earnings: $1,386,146

Major wins
- Critérium des Pouliches (1972); Poule d'Essai des Pouliches (1973); Prix de Diane (1973); Prix Vermeille (1973); Prix Ganay (1974, 1975); Prix d'Ispahan (1974); Prix Foy (1974, 1975); Prix de l'Arc de Triomphe (1974); Prix Dollar (1975)

Awards
- 2-year-old of the year in France (1972); 3-year-old of the year in France (1973); Filly of the year in France (1974, 1975); Horse of the year in France (1974); French Champions Series Hall of Fame (2025) Timeform rating: 136

Honours
- Prix Allez France at Chantilly Racecourse
- Timeform rating: 136

Allez France (24 May 1970 – 11 December 1989) was an American-bred, French-trained Thoroughbred racehorse and broodmare. She was the first French-trained filly to earn more than one million dollars. The 3rd winner of the French Fillies Triple Crown and the Prix de l'Arc de Triomphe, she's considered one of the greatest fillies in European flat racing and Daniel Wildenstein's first major winner.

Originally trained by Albert Klimscha at Chantilly, she showed promise as an unbeaten two-year-old, winning her maiden at Longchamp and the Critérium des Pouliches. At three, Allez France completed the French Fillies' Triple Crown by winning the Poule d'Essai des Pouliches, the Prix de Diane, and the Prix Vermeille in 1973. In that same season, she would enter the Prix de l'Arc de Triomphe as the favorite but would be beaten by Rheingold. She would also compete outside of France for the first time in the Champion Stakes at Ascot as the favorite, but would be upset by Hurry Harriet. At four in 1974, under Hall of Fame trainer Angel Penna, she went undefeated, winning the Prix Ganay, Prix d'Ispahan, Prix Foy, and Prix de l'Arc de Triomphe, despite her jockey suffering a serious leg injury the day before the Arc. At five, she won the Prix Ganay and Prix Foy a second time and competed in the Prix de l'Arc de Triomphe and Champion Stakes again, but lost both. For her final start, she would compete in the National Thoroughbred Championship at Santa Anita but would place last behind the Argentinian winner Dulcia. She was ridden by Yves Saint-Martin in all of her races.

In 1976, she was retired as a broodmare to Lane's End Farm in Versailles, Kentucky.

== Background ==
Allez France was a large bay mare with a thin, faint star marking bred in Kentucky by Bieber-Jacobs Stable. She was purchased as a yearling for $160,000 by French art dealer Daniel Wildenstein and became the first horse owned by him and the spur for his investment in racehorses and bloodstock. Her name, "Allez France", means "Go France" in French. According to Elinor Penna, the wife of her trainer, Angel Penna, "She was the most masculine female horse ever; powerful and very proud of it."

Due to her high-strung and cantankerous temperament, she was given a companion animal, a sheep named Bastian, also known as Steve. Despite Allez France's tendency to "bully" him, the two shared a strong bond. When Allez France was exported to the United States for her final start, the sheep was unable to accompany her due to a lack of proper paperwork, which reportedly caused him severe distress upon her departure.

Her sire, Sea-Bird, was a French champion who won the Epsom Derby and Prix de l'Arc de Triomphe by six lengths and ranks as Timeform's second-highest rated flat racehorse. Her dam, Priceless Gem, was an American runner also bred by Bieber-Jacobs Stable who won the Frizette Stakes and famously defeated Buckpasser in the Futurity Stakes at two.

== Racing career ==
=== 1972: two-year-old season ===
On Allez France's two-year-old debut at Longchamp on September 10, 1972, under trainer Albert Klimscha, she won a 1600-meter maiden race. A month later, on October 8, she won the Critérium des Pouliches in "spectacular style" at 5-2 odds.

=== 1973: three-year-old season ===
Allez France began her three-year-old season on April 29 in the Poule d'Essai des Pouliches, entering at 5-2 odds. This race marked her first meeting with her rival, Dahlia. Allez France won easily, while Dahlia finished 3rd, two and a half lengths behind the winner and a neck behind the runner up Princess Arjumand. On May 13, Allez France took on a mostly male field in the Prix Lupin. She finished 7th out of 11 runners, behind the winner Kalamoun owned by the Aga Khan IV, and 3rd place Roi Lear. However she bounced back on June 10, in the Prix de Diane at Chantilly. Facing Dahlia once again at 5-2 odds, Allez France had won again, with Dahlia in second place four lengths clear of the other 23 runners, the closest she's ever gotten to beating Allez France.

After finishing fourth in the Prix de la Nonette at Longchamp on September 2, Allez France entered the Prix Vermeille, the final leg of the French Fillies' Triple Crown. By defeating Dahlia, Virunga, Gay Style and Hurry Harriet, she became the third horse in history to sweep it. Afterwards, in October she entered the Prix de l'Arc de Triomphe as the favorite against a strong field of runners, including Hard To Beat, San San, Star Appeal, Hurry Harriet, and Dahlia. Allez France tried to catch him in the final stretch in second place, but Rheingold held her off to win by two and a half lengths, making his jockey Lester Piggott a first time Arc winner. Hard To Beat finished third, while Dahlia and Hurry Harriet finished in 16th and 19th places respectively. Allez France ended her season with her first race outside of France, the Champion Stakes at Ascot, as the favorite. With a field that included Sharp Edge, Scottish Rifle, and Mysterious, she finished second after being upset by the 33-1 longshot Hurry Harriet.

=== 1974: four-year-old season ===
In her four year old season, under her new trainer Angel Penna, she was undefeated. Winning the Prix d'Harcourt on April 15 and the Prix Ganay on May 5th, races her rival Dahlia placed 4th and 5th in respectively. as well as the Prix d'Ispahan on May 30 and the Prix Foy on September 8. For her final start, she returned to the Prix de l'Arc de Triomphe as the favorite in a field including Highclere, Sagaro, and Comtesse de Loir. Ten days before the race, her jockey Yves Saint-Martin, suffered a serious leg injury. While it was speculated that Lester Piggott would replace him for the race, Saint-Martin announced he was able to ride her after receiving pain-killing injections.

During the race, Allez France looked poised for an easy victory until Comtesse de Loir made a strong late run in the final 200 meters, and Allez France held on by a head over Comtesse de Loir, with Margouillat finishing three-quarters of a length back in third, and Kamaraan a further four lengths behind. Despite the tactical error and the resulting criticism, especially from Yves Saint-Martin himself, this win cemented her status as both the undisputed "Queen of Longchamp" and of France. Trainer Angel Penna also won his second Prix de l'Arc de Triomphe with Allez France, his first being with San San, and earned French Leading Trainer honors the same year.

=== 1975: five-year-old season ===
For her final season as a five-year-old, Allez France began by winning the Prix Ganay a second time on May 4, where her rival Dahlia finished last of six runners, and the Prix Dollar on June 1. After placing second in the Prix d'Ispahan behind Ramirez, she would win the Prix Foy again over Duke of Marmalade. Much like her three-year-old season, she entered the Prix de l'Arc de Triomphe again as the favorite. Facing a field that included Star Appeal, Green Dancer, Comtesse de Loir, Duke of Marmalade, and Dahlia. Both Allez France and Dahlia lost significant ground during the race and finished fifth, while Dahlia finished 15th. This race marked the final meeting between the two of them, and it yielded a huge upset. Star Appeal became the first German-trained horse to win the Arc, doing so at odds of 119/1. Allez France then traveled outside of France for the Champion Stakes. Facing Star Appeal and Ramirez once more, she again placed second, this time behind Rose Bowl.

Her final race would be in America for the first time to contest the National Thoroughbred Championship on dirt at Santa Anita Park. Her companion sheep could not travel with her due to paperwork issues and it would be the last time they would see each other. Allez France ultimately finished 11th, last behind Forceten, L'Enjoleur, and Ancient Title, who was the favourite. The winner ended up being Dulcia, a 6‐year‐old mare from Argentina ridden by Bill Shoemaker.

After the race, Allez France retired, winning a total of 8 G1 races and earnings of 1,386,146.

== Achievement and assessment ==
Her owner, Daniel Wildenstein, managed his French racing operations through Dayton Investments Limited, and his American racing operations through Allez France Stables, named after his first major winning horse, Allez France.

Allez France earned the title of top two-year-old in France in 1972 and top three-year-old in 1973. She was named Horse of the Year in France in 1974, and she won French Filly of the Year in both 1974 and 1975. In 2025, she was inducted into the French Champions Series Hall of Fame.

Timeform gave her a 136 rating. This ties her for first place as the highest-rated European female horse of all time.

An official French handicap rated Allez France the second best older female behind Comtesse de Loir and above Dahlia.

The Prix Allez France run at 2000 metres in Chantilly was named after her.

== Breeding record ==
Allez France's breeding career did not match her racing success and she only ended up having five foals. Her standout foals included Action Française (1985) winner of the Group III Prix de Sandringham and dam of Group III winner Android (1993) and grandmother to Argentina (2002), who placed second in both the Prix de Diane and Prix Saint-Alary. Another one of her notable foals, Air De France (1984), went on to become a successful sire, siring 11 stakes winners with a total of 34 stakes wins.

- 1980 Ave France (USA): Bay filly by Seattle Slew (USA) - unraced
- 1984 Air de France (USA): Brown colt, foaled 7 March, by Seattle Slew (USA) - won 1 race from two starts in France, successful sire in Australia
- 1985 Action Francaise (USA): Brown filly by Nureyev (USA) - won two races including the G3 Prix de Sandringham at Chantilly from 4 starts in France and England 1988
- 1988 Allons Enfants (USA): Bay filly, foaled February 17, by Spend a Buck (USA)

Allez France died on December 11, 1989, at age 19 following a leg fracture caused by another broodmare in a pasture at Lane's End Farm. After her death, Allez France was honored by being buried next to Man O' War and other greats at the Kentucky Horse Park at Lexington, Kentucky.

== Pedigree ==
Pedigree of Allez France, bay mare 1970
Sire Sea-Bird (FR) 1962	Dan Cupid (USA); 1956	Native Dancer	Polynesian
Sire Sea-Bird (FR) 1962	Dan Cupid (USA); 1956	Native Dancer	Geisha
Sire Sea-Bird (FR) 1962	Dan Cupid (USA); 1956	Vixenette	Sickle
Sire Sea-Bird (FR) 1962	Dan Cupid (USA); 1956	Vixenette	Lady Reynard
Sire Sea-Bird (FR) 1962	Sicalade (FR); 1956	Sicambre	Prince Bio
Sire Sea-Bird (FR) 1962	Sicalade (FR); 1956	Sicambre	Sif
Sire Sea-Bird (FR) 1962	Sicalade (FR); 1956	Mamelade	Maurepas
Sire Sea-Bird (FR) 1962	Sicalade (FR); 1956	Mamelade	Couleur
Dam Priceless Gem (USA) 1963	Hail To Reason (USA); 1958	Turn-To	Royal Charger
Dam Priceless Gem (USA) 1963	Hail To Reason (USA); 1958	Turn-To	Source Sucree
Dam Priceless Gem (USA) 1963	Hail To Reason (USA); 1958	Nothirdchance	Blue Swords
Dam Priceless Gem (USA) 1963	Hail To Reason (USA); 1958	Nothirdchance	Galla Colors
Dam Priceless Gem (USA) 1963	Searching (USA); 1952	War Admiral	Man o' War
Dam Priceless Gem (USA) 1963	Searching (USA); 1952	War Admiral	Brushup
Dam Priceless Gem (USA) 1963	Searching (USA); 1952	Big Hurry	Black Toney
Dam Priceless Gem (USA) 1963	Searching (USA); 1952	Big Hurry	La Troienne (Family 1-x)

== See also ==
- List of racehorses
- Racehorses trained in France
