= 1972 in sports =

1972 in sports describes the year's events in world sport.

== Alpine skiing ==
- Alpine Skiing World Cup
  - Men's overall season champion: Gustav Thöni, Italy
  - Women's overall season champion: Annemarie Pröll, Austria

== American football ==
- 16 January − Super Bowl VI: the Dallas Cowboys (NFC) won 24−3 over the Miami Dolphins (AFC)
  - Location: Tulane Stadium
  - Attendance: 81,023
  - MVP: Roger Staubach, QB (Dallas)
- Orange Bowl (1971 season):
  - The Nebraska Cornhuskers won 38–6 over the Alabama Crimson Tide to win the college football national championship
- 23 December – In the first Pittsburgh Steelers playoff game in 25 years (and the franchises first playoff win), rookie Franco Harris salvages and converts into a touchdown a final seconds Terry Bradshaw incomplete pass in what has been called the greatest play in NFL history—The Immaculate Reception—to beat the Oakland Raiders 13–7.

== Association football ==
- Brazil – Palmeiras wins the Campeonato Brasileiro
- England – FA Cup – Leeds United won 1–0 over Arsenal
- Europe – Cup Winners' Cup – Rangers F.C. won 3–2 over Dinamo Moscow
- West Germany beat the Soviet Union 3–0 to win the European Championship.

== Athletics ==
- September – Athletics at the 1972 Summer Olympics held in Munich

== Australian rules football ==
- Victorian Football League
  - Carlton wins the 76th VFL Premiership (Carlton 28.9 (177) d Richmond 22.18 (150))
  - Brownlow Medal awarded to Len Thompson (Collingwood)

== Baseball ==
Hall of Famer Sandy Koufax

- The Washington Senators move to Dallas-Fort Worth, Texas to become the Texas Rangers.
- 19 January – The BBWAA elects Sandy Koufax (344 votes), Yogi Berra (339), and Early Wynn (301) to the Hall of Fame.
- Sparky Lyle saves 35 games for the New York Yankees, breaking Ron Perranoski's 1970 records for AL pitchers and left-handers. Lyle also becomes the first left-hander to save 100 career games in the American League.
- World Series – Oakland Athletics win their first World Championship since the team was based in Philadelphia in 1930, and sixth in franchise history, by defeating the Cincinnati Reds, 4 games to 3.
- 31 December – The Pittsburgh Pirates' legendary right fielder Roberto Clemente dies in a plane crash near Puerto Rico on his way to bring relief supplies to Nicaraguan earthquake victims.

== Basketball ==
- NCAA Division I Men's Basketball Championship –
  - UCLA wins 81–76 over Florida St.
- NBA Finals –
  - Los Angeles Lakers won 4 games to 1 over the New York Knicks
- 1972 ABA Finals –
  - Indiana Pacers defeat New York Nets 4 games to 2

== Boxing ==
- 26 June – Roberto Durán stopped Ken Buchanan in the thirteenth round to win the WBA Lightweight Championship.

== Canadian football ==
- Grey Cup – Hamilton Tiger-Cats won 13–10 over the Saskatchewan Roughriders
- Vanier Cup – Alberta Golden Bears won 20–7 over the Wilfrid Laurier Golden Hawks

== Cycling ==
- Giro d'Italia won by Eddy Merckx of Belgium
- Tour de France – Eddy Merckx of Belgium
- UCI Road World Championships – Men's road race – Marino Basso of Italy

== Disc sports ==
- Disc sports are introduced to Canada at the Canadian Open Frisbee Championships in Toronto

== Field hockey ==
- Olympic Games (Men's Competition) in Munich, West Germany
  - Gold Medal: West Germany
  - Silver Medal: Pakistan
  - Bronze Medal:

== Figure skating ==
- World Figure Skating Championships –
  - Men's champion: Ondrej Nepela, Czechoslovakia
  - Ladies' champion: Trixi Schuba, Austria
  - Pair skating champions: Irina Rodnina & Alexei Ulyanov, Soviet Union
  - Ice dancing champions: Lyudmila Pakhomova & Alexandr Gorshkov, Soviet Union

== Golf ==
Men's professional

- Masters Tournament – Jack Nicklaus
- U.S. Open – Jack Nicklaus
- British Open – Lee Trevino
- PGA Championship – Gary Player
- PGA Tour money leader – Jack Nicklaus – $320,542
- The European Tour begins its first season of competition.

Men's amateur

- British Amateur – Trevor Homer
- U.S. Amateur – Vinny Giles

Women's professional

- LPGA Championship – Kathy Ahern
- U.S. Women's Open – Susie Berning
- Titleholders Championship – Sandra Palmer
- LPGA Tour money leader – Kathy Whitworth – $65,063

== Harness racing ==
- 21 September – Strike Out became the first Canadian owned harness racing horse to ever win the Little Brown Jug.
- United States Pacing Triple Crown races –
  1. Cane Pace – Hilarious Way
  2. Little Brown Jug – Strike Out
  3. Messenger Stakes – Silent Majority
- Super Bowl wins the United States Trotting Triple Crown races –
  1. Hambletonian – Super Bowl
  2. Yonkers Trot – Super Bowl
  3. Kentucky Futurity – Super Bowl
- Australian Inter Dominion Harness Racing Championship –
  - Pacers: Welcome Advice

== Horse racing ==
Steeplechases

- Cheltenham Gold Cup – Glencaraig Lady
- Grand National – Well To Do

Flat races

- Australia – Melbourne Cup won by Piping Lane
- Canada – Queen's Plate won by Victoria Song
- France – Prix de l'Arc de Triomphe won by San San
- Ireland – Irish Derby Stakes won by Steel Pulse
- English Triple Crown Races:
  1. 2,000 Guineas Stakes – High Top
  2. The Derby – Roberto
  3. St. Leger Stakes – Boucher
- United States Triple Crown Races:
  1. Kentucky Derby – Riva Ridge
  2. Preakness Stakes – Bee Bee Bee
  3. Belmont Stakes – Riva Ridge

== Ice hockey ==
- 18 March - NCAA Men's Ice Hockey Championship – Boston University Terriers defeat Cornell University Big Red 4–0 in Boston, Massachusetts
- 22 April - Czechoslovakia defeats the Soviet Union to win the 1972 Ice Hockey World Championships.
- 11 May - The Boston Bruins defeat the New York Rangers 3–0 to win the 1972 Stanley Cup Finals four games to two.
- 14 May - The Cornwall Royals defeat the Peterborough Petes to win the 1972 Memorial Cup Canadian amateur ice hockey junior men's championship.
- 15 May - The Spokane Jets defeat the Barrie Flyers 6–3 to win the 1972 Allan Cup Canadian amateur ice hockey senior men's championship.
- Art Ross Trophy as the NHL's leading scorer during the regular season: Phil Esposito, Boston Bruins
- Hart Memorial Trophy – for the NHL's Most Valuable Player: Bobby Orr, Boston Bruins
- 28 September – Paul Henderson scored the "goal of the century" to give Canada the win in the Summit Series, the first ever Canada versus the Soviet Union challenge series.
- 7 October - The National Hockey League begins the 1972–73 season.
- 11 October - The World Hockey Association (WHA) professional league begins play in its first season. This new league signed several of the top NHL stars including Bobby Hull and Derek Sanderson.

== Lacrosse ==
- The Long Branch P.C.O.'s win the first Founders Cup.
- The New Westminster Salmonbellies win the Mann Cup.
- The Peterborough PCO's win the Minto Cup.

== Rugby league ==
- 1972 NSWRFL season
- 1972 New Zealand rugby league season
- 1971–72 Northern Rugby Football League season / 1972–73 Northern Rugby Football League season
- 1972 Rugby League World Cup

== Rugby union ==
- 78th Five Nations Championship series is undecided after two matches are not played for political reasons

== Snooker ==
- World Snooker Championship – Alex Higgins beats John Spencer 37–32

== Swimming ==
- XX Olympic Games, held in Munich, West Germany (28 August – 4 September)

== Tennis ==
- Grand Slam in tennis men's results:
  1. Australian Open – Ken Rosewall
  2. French Open – Andrés Gimeno
  3. Wimbledon championships – Stan Smith
  4. U.S. Open – Ilie Năstase
- Grand Slam in tennis women's results:
  1. Australian Open – Virginia Wade
  2. French Open – Billie Jean King
  3. Wimbledon championships – Billie Jean King
  4. U.S. Open – Billie Jean King (first player in Open Era to repeat as singles champion)
- Davis Cup – United States wins 3–2 over Romania in world tennis.

== General sporting events ==
- 1972 Summer Olympics takes place in Munich, Germany
  - USSR wins the most medals (99), and the most gold medals (50)
- 1972 Winter Olympics takes place in Sapporo, Japan
  - USSR wins the most medals (16), and the most gold medals (8)
- Seventh Winter Universiade held in Lake Placid, New York, United States

== Awards ==
- Associated Press Male Athlete of the Year – Mark Spitz, Swimming
- Associated Press Female Athlete of the Year – Olga Korbut, Gymnastics
