= Popkins =

British-bred Thoroughbred racehorse

- Sire: Romulus
- Grandsire: Ribot
- Dam: Peat Fire
- Damsire: Mossborough
- Sex: Filly
- Foaled: 1967
- Country: Great Britain
- Colour: Chestnut
- Owner: Budgie Moller
- Trainer: Harry Wragg
- Record: 6: 4-1-1
- Earnings: US $ 21,137

Major wins
- Sun Chariot Stakes (1970); Prix de la Nonette (1970); Prix de Psyché (1970); Princess Elizabeth Stakes (1970)
- Last updated on April 1, 2011

Popkins (foaled 1967) was a United Kingdom Thoroughbred racehorse. The Chestnut filly is out of the mare Peat Fire and sired by Romulus. Her grandsire was Ribot, the Leading sire in Great Britain & Ireland on three occasions, and her damsire was Mossborough.

In 1970, ridden by Lester Piggott, Popkins won the Sun Chariot Stakes at Newmarket. Also, the same year she won the Prix de la Nonette, the Prix de Psyché and the Princess Elizabeth Stakes. In her other two races she placed second in the Prix de Royaumont, and third in the Poule d'Essai des Pouliches (the French 1,000 Guineas).

As a broodmare, her progeny includes Cherry Hinton the 1977 Champion 2 year old Filly in England, sired by Nijinsky.
