= Cherry Hinton (horse) =

American-bred Thoroughbred racehorse

- Sire: Nijinsky
- Grandsire: Northern Dancer
- Dam: Popkins
- Damsire: Romulus
- Sex: Mare
- Foaled: 7 April 1975
- Country: United States
- Colour: Bay
- Breeder: Ralph Moller
- Owner: Ralph Moller
- Trainer: Harry Wragg
- Record: 8:2-2-2

Major wins
- Argos Star Fillies' Mile (1977)

Awards
- Top-rated British two-year-old (1977); Timeform best two-year-old filly (1977); Timeform rating 125 (1977), 116 (1978)

Cherry Hinton (7 April 1975 – after 1991) was an American-bred, British-trained Thoroughbred racehorse and broodmare. Despite never competing above Group Three level, she was officially rated the best two-year-old filly in Britain, and was rated the best juvenile filly in Europe by Timeform. She ran well in defeat in her first two races before winning the Tadcaster Stakes at York Racecourse and then establishing her reputation with a wide-margin victory in the Argos Star Fillies' Mile. She was expected to play a leading role in the following season's classics but had a series of training problem and failed to win in three starts. She later had some success as a broodmare.

== Background ==
Cherry Hinton was a "big, rangy and most attractive" bay mare with a small white star bred in Kentucky by her owner Ralph "Budgie" Moller. She was from the fourth crop of foals sired by Nijinsky, the Canadian-bred winner of the 1970 English Triple Crown, before going on to become an important breeding stallion, siring horses such as Ferdinand, Lammtarra, Caerleon, Sky Classic and Shahrastani. Cherry Hinton was the fourth foal, and third winner produced by her dam Popkins, a high-class racemare (rated 120 by Timeform) who won the Sun Chariot Stakes and the Prix de la Nonette in 1970. As a descendant of the broodmare Traffic Light, Popkins was related to several good winners including Sodium and Ambiguity. The filly was named after a village in Cambridgeshire.

Like most of the horses owned by Moller, Cherry Hinton was trained by Harry Wragg at his Abington Place stables in Newmarket, Suffolk.

== Racing career ==
=== 1977: two-year-old season ===
On her racecourse debut, Cherry Hinton contested a maiden race over six furlongs at Haydock Park Racecourse in early August in which she finished third behind the colt Bolak, who won the Solario Stakes a month later. The filly then started favourite in a field of twenty-one colts and fillies for the Convivial Stakes over six furlongs at York Racecourse. The field split into two groups and although Cherry Hinton defeated the colt Formidable to finish in front of the group on the left side (from the jockey's viewpoint), she was beaten two and a half lengths by John de Coombe on the opposite side. The form was subsequently boosted as John de Coombe recorded an upset victory over some of the best juveniles in France (including Super Concorde) in the Prix de la Salamandre, whilst Formidable won both the Mill Reef Stakes and the Middle Park Stakes.

Cherry Hinton's next race was the Tadcaster Stakes over the same course and distance in September in which she carried five pounds less than the Lowther Stakes runner-up Be Sweet. Lester Piggott employed waiting tactics, restraining the filly at the back of the field before making a move forward inside the final furlong and catching favourite Be Sweet. According to Timeform, the neck victory "gave no indication of her superiority". Later that month, the filly was moved up in the class for the Argos Star Mile (then a Group Three race) at Ascot Racecourse and started 10/11 favourite carrying top weight of 127 pounds. Her opponents included Tartan Pimpernel, Fiordiligi and Watch Out, the first three finishers in the May Hill Stakes. Piggott settled the filly behind the leaders before moving up to take the lead a furlong and a half from the finish and drawing away to win by five lengths from Tartan Pimpernel.

=== 1978: three-year-old season ===
Cherry Hinton started 1978 as the clear favourite for both the 1000 Guineas and the Oaks, but her size reportedly made her difficult to train and was slow to reach peak fitness. On her three-year-old debut, looking less than fully fit, she finished second, beaten two and a half lengths by the Paul Cole-trained Shapina in the Fred Darling Stakes at Newbury Racecourse. Cherry Hinton was still strongly fancied for the 1000 Guineas the 1000 Guineas at Newmarket, but appeared badly outpaced in the closing stages and finished fourth behind Enstone Spark, Fair Salinia and Seraphima.

Cherry Hinton bypassed the Oaks, reappearing in the Ribblesdale Stakes at Royal Ascot. She started favourite, despite sweating up badly before the start, but finished third behind Relfo and Be Sweet. The filly was sent to Ireland for the Irish Oaks but after enduring a bad journey to Ireland she was withdrawn shortly before the race. Her preparation for the Yorkshire Oaks in August was interrupted by back problems and she ran poorly, finishing unplaced behind Fair Salinia. Her retirement was announced two weeks later.

== Assessment ==
There was no International Classification of European two-year-olds in 1976: the official handicappers of Britain, Ireland and France compiled separate rankings for horses which competed in those countries. In the British Free Handicap, Cherry Hinton was rated the best filly of the season, five pounds ahead of Cistus (Waterford Candelabra Stakes) and Sookera (Cheveley Park Stakes) and four pounds behind the leading colt Try My Best. The independent Timeform organisation rated Cherry Hinton the best two-year-old filly of the season with a rating of 125, and described her win at Ascot as "magnificent", comparing it favourably to that of Noblesse in the 1963 Timeform Gold Cup. In the following year she was rated 116 by Timeform, thirteen pounds behind their leading three-year-old filly Swiss Maid: she did not receive a rating in the International Classification.

== Breeding record ==
Cherry Hinton was retired from racing to become a broodmare and produced at least four foals between 1982 and 1991:

- Cherry Ridge (bay filly, foaled in 1982, sired by Riva Ridge), won three races including the Sceptre Stakes
- Mycenae Cherry (chestnut filly, 1983, by Troy), won one race
- Red Glow (bay colt, 1985, by Kalaglow), won the Dante Stakes, fourth when favourite for the Derby
- Jagged Sword (colt 1991, by Kris)

== Pedigree ==
Pedigree of Cherry Hinton (USA), bay mare, 1975
Sire Nijinsky (CAN) 1967	Northern Dancer (CAN); 1961	Nearctic	Nearco
Sire Nijinsky (CAN) 1967	Northern Dancer (CAN); 1961	Nearctic	Lady Angela
Sire Nijinsky (CAN) 1967	Northern Dancer (CAN); 1961	Natalma	Native Dancer
Sire Nijinsky (CAN) 1967	Northern Dancer (CAN); 1961	Natalma	Almahmoud
Sire Nijinsky (CAN) 1967	Flaming Page (CAN); 1959	Bull Page	Bull Lea
Sire Nijinsky (CAN) 1967	Flaming Page (CAN); 1959	Bull Page	Our Page
Sire Nijinsky (CAN) 1967	Flaming Page (CAN); 1959	Flaring Top	Menow
Sire Nijinsky (CAN) 1967	Flaming Page (CAN); 1959	Flaring Top	Flaming Top
Dam Popkins (GB) 1967	Romulus (GB); 1959	Ribot	Tenerani
Dam Popkins (GB) 1967	Romulus (GB); 1959	Ribot	Romanella
Dam Popkins (GB) 1967	Romulus (GB); 1959	Arietta	Tudor Minstrel
Dam Popkins (GB) 1967	Romulus (GB); 1959	Arietta	Anne of Essex
Dam Popkins (GB) 1967	Peat Fire (GB); 1962	Mossborough	Nearco
Dam Popkins (GB) 1967	Peat Fire (GB); 1962	Mossborough	All Moonshine
Dam Popkins (GB) 1967	Peat Fire (GB); 1962	Test Match	Big Game
Dam Popkins (GB) 1967	Peat Fire (GB); 1962	Test Match	Traffic Light (Family:1-p)
