= Formidable (horse) =

American-bred Thoroughbred racehorse

- Sire: Forli
- Grandsire: Aristophanes
- Dam: Native Partner
- Damsire: Raise a Native
- Sex: Stallion
- Foaled: 8 April 1975
- Country: United States
- Colour: Bay
- Breeder: Ralph C. Wilson Jr.
- Owner: Peter Goulandris
- Trainer: Peter Walwyn
- Record: 20: 8-3-4

Major wins
- Mill Reef Stakes (1977); Middle Park Stakes (1977)

Awards
- Timeform rating 125 (1977), 121 (1978), 114 (1979)

Formidable (8 April 1975 – 1997) was an American-bred, British-trained Thoroughbred racehorse and sire. He showed his best form as a two-year-old when he won five consecutive races in little over a month, including the Mill Reef Stakes and the Middle Park Stakes. At the end of the year he was regarded as the best juvenile in Britain over a distance of six furlongs. In the following year he was campaigned over one mile and failed to win, although he was placed in the St James's Palace Stakes, the Sussex Stakes and the Waterford Crystal Mile. As a four-year-old he won three minor races and finished third in the Lockinge Stakes before being retired from racing. He later became a successful breeding stallion.

== Background ==
Formidable was a "robust, attractive, strong-quartered" bay horse with two white socks (on his right front and left hind leg) bred in Kentucky by Ralph C. Wilson, Jr. His sire Forli was a champion in his native Argentina before becoming a successful breeding stallion in the United States where the best of his offspring included Thatch and Forego. His dam Native Partner was a successful racemare and a half-sister to Jim French. She went on to become an influential broodmare with her descendants including Ajdal, Noverre, Dance in the Dark and Dance Partner.

As a yearling Formidable was offered for sale and bought for $60,000 by the bloodstock agent Ray Barnes. The colt entered the ownership of Peter Goulandris and was sent to Europe where he was trained by Peter Walwyn at his Seven Barrows stable near Lambourn in Berkshire.

== Racing career ==
=== 1977: two-year-old season ===
All of Formidable's races in 1977 were over six furlongs. He made his racecourse debut in a six furlong maiden race at Windsor Racecourse in June and finished second of the twenty-two runners behind St Jills, beaten two and a half lengths by the winner. In late July he ran in the Foxhall Maiden Stakes at Goodwood Racecourse. He looked less than fully fit and was beaten by Vaigly Great a colt who later won the Ayr Gold Cup and the Palace House Stakes. At York Racecourse in August he contested the Convivial Maiden Stakes and finished third to Cherry Hinton and John de Coombe (later to win the Prix de la Salamandre). Ten days after his defeat at York, Formidable recorded his first win at his fourth attempt as he easily defeated a moderate field in the Great Park Stakes at Windsor. A week later he faced five horses in the Linenhall Stakes at Chester Racecourse and won by seven lengths (Timeform reported that the winning distance was nearer ten lengths) despite running very wide on the final turn. He was back in action a week later in the Bradgate Stakes at York and was even more impressive as he led from the start and won by a wide margin a very fast time.

Nine days after his win at York, Formidable was moved up in class and started the 13/8 favourite for the Group Two Mill Reef at Newbury Racecourse. His opponents included Tumbledownwind and Aythorpe (first and second in the Gimcrack Stakes) as well as the Sirenia Stakes runner-up Soldiers Point. He tracked the leaders as Tumbledownwind set a very fast pace before taking the lead in the last quarter mile. He quickly opened up a clear advantage but appeared to falter in the final furlong before holding on to win by three quarters of a length from Aythorpe. In early October, Formidable appeared for the fifth time in five weeks when he ran in the Group One Middle Park Stakes at Newmarket Racecourse. He looked very impressive in the paddock and was made the 15/8 favourite against opponents including the Richmond Stakes winner Persian Bold and Labienus, who had finished third in the Champagne Stakes. He raced close behind the leaders before going to the front two furlongs from the finish and winning by three quarters of a length from Persian Bold.

=== 1978: three-year-old season ===
Formidable sustained a pulled muscle in his hindquarters in the early part of 1978 and had not fully recovered when he ran unplaced behind Roland Gardens in the 2000 Guineas. He ran slightly better when matched against older horses in the Lockinge Stakes at Newbury, finishing fourth behind the four-year-old Don. In June he was moved up in distance to contest the 199th running of The Derby and ran well for a long way before fading in the final furlong and finishing unplaced behind Shirley Heights. He was brought back in distance for the St James's Palace Stakes at Royal Ascot later in the month and finished third behind Jaazeiro and Persian Bold. The Sussex Stakes at Goodwood in July saw a repeat of the Ascot placings, with Jaazeiro winning from Persian Bold with Formidable taking third place. The Waterford Crystal Mile over the same course and distance in August saw Formidable produce his best performance of the season. He tracked the early leader Captain James before going to the front a furlong out and, with the favourite Jaazeiro struggling in third, looked likely to win. In the closing stages however, Captain James rallied strongly, regained the advantage, and beat Formidable by a neck. On his only subsequent appearance that year, the colt was sent to France for the Prix du Moulin at Longchamp Racecourse on 24 September but made no impact, finishing ninth of ten behind Sanedtki.

=== 1979: four-year-old season ===
In the early part of 1979 Formidable was dropped in class and had his first successes since his two-year-old season as he recorded easy wins in minor events over one mile at Wolverhampton and Brighton. In May he defeated Roland Gardens by a length in the Cold Shield Windows Trophy over seven furlongs at Haydock Park Racecourse, but appeared to be a rather lucky winner as the runner-up had struggled to obtain a clear run in the closing stages. He then finished third behind Young Generation and Skyliner in the Lockinge Stakes before running fourth behind the filly Spring In Deepsea in the Diomed Stakes at Epsom in June.

== Stud record ==
Formidable was retired from racing at the end of the 1979 season and began his career as a breeding stallion at the Lavington Stud in Sussex. The most important of his offspring included Efisio (Horris Hill Stakes, Premio Emilio Turati, Challenge Stakes, Premio Chiusura), Chilibang (King's Stand Stakes), Forzando (Premio Melton, Sandy Lane Stakes, Fort Marcy Handicap, Metropolitan Handicap) and Kerita (Supreme Stakes).

Both Efisio and Forzando became successful sires: Efisio sired the leading racemares Attraction, Frizzante and Hever Golf Rose; Forzando's offspring included Superior Premium (Cork and Orrery Stakes) and Easycall (Richmond Stakes).

== Assessment ==
There was no International Classification of European two-year-olds in 1977: the official handicappers of Britain, Ireland and France compiled separate rankings for horses which competed in those countries. In the British Free Handicap, Formidable was rated the third best two-year-old behind Try My Best and Sexton Blake, first and second in the Dewhurst Stakes. The independent Timeform organisation gave him a rating of 125, three pounds behind Try My Best, who was their top-rated two-year-old. In their annual Racehorses of 1977 Timeform described him as "the best six-furlong two-year-old in the country", but expressed doubts about his ability to stay longer distances. In 1978 he was rated on 121 by Timeform, twelve pounds behind the leading three-year-old Ile de Bourbon. In the International Classification he was given a mark of 82, thirteen pounds behind Ile de Bourbon who was the top-rated horse in the three-year-old division. He was rated 114 by Timeform in 1979.

== Sire line tree ==
- Formidable
  - Forzando
    - Easycall
    - Superior Premium
  - Efisio
  - Chilibang

== Pedigree ==
Pedigree of Formidable (USA), bay stallion, 1975
Sire Forli (ARG) 1963	Aristophanes (GB); 1948	Hyperion	Gainsborough
Sire Forli (ARG) 1963	Aristophanes (GB); 1948	Hyperion	Selene
Sire Forli (ARG) 1963	Aristophanes (GB); 1948	Commotion	Mieuxce
Sire Forli (ARG) 1963	Aristophanes (GB); 1948	Commotion	Riot
Sire Forli (ARG) 1963	Trevisa (ARG); 1951	Advocate	Fair Trial
Sire Forli (ARG) 1963	Trevisa (ARG); 1951	Advocate	Guiding Star
Sire Forli (ARG) 1963	Trevisa (ARG); 1951	Veneta	Foxglove
Sire Forli (ARG) 1963	Trevisa (ARG); 1951	Veneta	Dogaresa
Dam Native Partner (USA) 1966	Raise a Native (USA); 1961	Native Dancer	Polynesian
Dam Native Partner (USA) 1966	Raise a Native (USA); 1961	Native Dancer	Geisha
Dam Native Partner (USA) 1966	Raise a Native (USA); 1961	Raise You	Case Ace
Dam Native Partner (USA) 1966	Raise a Native (USA); 1961	Raise You	Lady Glory
Dam Native Partner (USA) 1966	Dinner Partner (USA); 1959	Tom Fool	Menow
Dam Native Partner (USA) 1966	Dinner Partner (USA); 1959	Tom Fool	Gaga
Dam Native Partner (USA) 1966	Dinner Partner (USA); 1959	Bluehaze	Blue Larkspur
Dam Native Partner (USA) 1966	Dinner Partner (USA); 1959	Bluehaze	Flaming Swords (Family:7)
