= Broadway Dancer =

American-bred Thoroughbred racehorse

- Sire: Northern Dancer
- Grandsire: Nearctic
- Dam: Broadway Melody
- Damsire: Tudor Melody
- Sex: Mare
- Foaled: 16 February 1972
- Country: United States
- Colour: Bay
- Breeder: Nickols Brothers
- Owner: Daniel Wildenstein
- Trainer: Angel Penna Sr.
- Record: 6:2-1-1

Major wins
- Prix Morny (1974)

Awards
- Timeform rating 131 (1974); Timeform top-rated two-year-old filly Top-rated French two-year-old filly(1974)

Broadway Dancer (foaled 16 February 1972) was an American-bred, French-trained Thoroughbred racehorse and broodmare. Between June 1974 and August 1975, she raced six times, winning twice. As a two-year-old, she won on her debut before being narrowly beaten in the Prix Robert Papin, before recording an emphatic six-length success in the Prix Morny. Although she did not race again in 1974, she was the highest-rated juvenile filly of the season in both the official French Handicap and the independent Timeform ratings. After running third when favourite for the Poule d'Essai des Pouliches on her three-year-old debut, she ran poorly in two subsequent races, and was retired from racing.

== Background ==
Broadway Dancer was a small bay mare with a white star and a white sock on her left hind leg bred in Kentucky by the Nickols Brothers. She was one of many important winners sired by the Canadian-bred Northern Dancer, who won the Kentucky Derby in 1964 before becoming one of the most successful breeding stallions in Thoroughbred history. Broadway Dancer's dam Broadway Melody, was a high-class racemare who finished second in the Queen Mary Stakes in 1966 and the Jersey Stakes in the following year. Broadway Melody was a half-sister to the dam of the King's Stand Stakes winner African Song and a distant relative of the Prix de l'Arc de Triomphe winner Marienbard. The filly was acquired by Daniel Wildenstein and was sent to France to be trained by the Argentinian Angel Penna Sr.

== Racing career ==
=== 1974: two-year-old season ===
Broadway Dancer made a successful racecourse debut at Chantilly Racecourse in June when she was an impressive winner of maiden race over 1100 metres. She was then moved up sharply in class and matched against colts in the Group One Prix Robert Papin over the same distance at Maisons-Laffitte Racecourse on 28 July. Ridden by Yves Saint-Martin she started at odds of 7/2 and finished second, beaten a neck by the colt Sky Commander. On 18 August, at Deauville Racecourse, faced Sky Commander again in the Prix Morny. Partnered again by Saint-Martin she started the 4.7/1 second favourite behind the Prix Yacowlef winner Free Round, Broadway Dancer was restrained in the early stages before drawing alongside the leaders 200 metres from the finish, before accelerating away from her rival and winning by six lengths from Princesse Lee. Broadway Dancer did not race again in 1974.

=== 1975: three-year-old season ===
On her first appearance as a three-year-old, Broadway Dancer started the 4/5 favourite for the Poule d'Essai des Pouliches over 1600 metres at Longchamp Racecourse on 4 May. Racing for the first time in eight months, she finished third of the ten runners behind Ivanjica and Nobiliary. Three weeks later, the filly was moved up in distance for the Prix Saint-Alary over 2000 metres at the same course. She again started favourite but finished eighth of the twelve runners behind Nobiliary. Broadway Dancer was brought back in distance for the Prix Maurice de Gheest over 1300 metres at Deauville on 3 August. Ridden by the Italian Gianfranco Dettori she finished unplaced behind Sky Commander.

== Assessment ==
There was no International Classification of European two-year-olds in 1974: the official handicappers of Britain, Ireland and France compiled separate rankings for horses which competed in those countries. In the official French Handicap, Broadway Dancer was rated the best two-year-old filly of 1974, two pounds behind the leading colt Mariacci and five pounds ahead of the next-best filly Delmora. The independent Timeform organisation awarded Broadway Dancer a rating of 131, the highest given to any juvenile filly in 1974, but named Cry of Truth (rated 129) as their best two-year-old filly. In their annual Racehorses of 1974, Timeform stated that Broadway Dancer was "likely to prove exceptional". In the official French Handicap for 1975, Broadway Dancer was rated fifteen pounds behind the leading three-year-old filly Ivanjica.

== Breeding record ==
Broadway Dancer became a broodmare for Wildenstein's breeding operations. She produced several foals between 1977 and 1990 but only one minor winner.

- Behave (filly, foaled 1977, sired by Brigadier Gerard) failed to win in two races
- Bombshell (bay filly, 1979, by Ashmore), failed to win in five races
- Bal Royal (bay colt, 1980 by Arctic Tern), won two races
- Bonnys Niece (filly, 1982, by Great Nephew)
- Belle Bleue (filly, 1988, by Blazing Saddles), failed to win in seven races

== Pedigree ==
Pedigree of Broadway Dancer (USA), bay mare, 1972
Sire Northern Dancer (CAN) 1961	Nearctic (CAN); 1954	Nearco	Pharos
Sire Northern Dancer (CAN) 1961	Nearctic (CAN); 1954	Nearco	Nogara
Sire Northern Dancer (CAN) 1961	Nearctic (CAN); 1954	Lady Angela	Hyperion
Sire Northern Dancer (CAN) 1961	Nearctic (CAN); 1954	Lady Angela	Sister Sarah
Sire Northern Dancer (CAN) 1961	Natalma (USA); 1957	Native Dancer	Polynesian
Sire Northern Dancer (CAN) 1961	Natalma (USA); 1957	Native Dancer	Geisha
Sire Northern Dancer (CAN) 1961	Natalma (USA); 1957	Almahmoud	Mahmoud
Sire Northern Dancer (CAN) 1961	Natalma (USA); 1957	Almahmoud	Arbitrator
Dam Broadway Melody (GB) 1964	Tudor Melody (GB); 1956	Tudor Minstrel	Owen Tudor
Dam Broadway Melody (GB) 1964	Tudor Melody (GB); 1956	Tudor Minstrel	Sansonnet
Dam Broadway Melody (GB) 1964	Tudor Melody (GB); 1956	Matelda	Dante
Dam Broadway Melody (GB) 1964	Tudor Melody (GB); 1956	Matelda	Fairly Hot
Dam Broadway Melody (GB) 1964	Goldwyn Girl (GB); 1953	Court Martial	Fair Trial
Dam Broadway Melody (GB) 1964	Goldwyn Girl (GB); 1953	Court Martial	Instantaneous
Dam Broadway Melody (GB) 1964	Goldwyn Girl (GB); 1953	Zolotaia	Gold Bridge
Dam Broadway Melody (GB) 1964	Goldwyn Girl (GB); 1953	Zolotaia	Thamar (Family: 12-g)
