= Val de Loir =

French-bred Thoroughbred racehorse

- Sire: Vieux Manoir
- Grandsire: Brantome
- Dam: Vali
- Damsire: Sunny Boy
- Sex: Stallion
- Foaled: 1959
- Country: France
- Colour: Bay
- Breeder: Marquise du Vivier
- Owner: Robert Forget
- Record: 21: 7-2-2
- Earnings: $268,771

Major wins
- Prix Noailles (1962); Prix du Jockey Club (1962); Prix Hocquart (1962); Grand Prix de Deauville (1963)

Awards
- Leading sire in France (1973, 1974, 1975); Leading broodmare sire in Britain & Ireland (1981)

Val de Loir (May 7, 1959 – October 30, 1974) was a French Thoroughbred racehorse who won important races in France including the French Derby and was a Champion sire.

== Stud record ==
Val de Loir stood at Haras de Sassy in Saint-Christophe-le-Jajolet in Lower Normandy. He sired the Prix du Jockey Club winner Val de l'Orne, the Prix Saint-Alary winner Comtesse de Loir, the Grand Prix de Paris winners Chaparral (1969) and Tennyson (1973), the 1968 Epsom Oaks winner, La Lagune, the 1970 Gran Premio de Madrid winner, Ifniri, and the 1976 Irish Oaks and Prix Vermeille winner, Lagunette.

Among his other offspring, Val de Loir was the damsire of 1981 Epsom Derby winner Shergar, the 1983 Epsom Oaks winner, Sun Princess, and Green Dancer, winner of the 1975 French 2,000 Guineas and the Leading sire in France in 1991.

== Sire line tree ==
- Val de Loir
  - Val d'Aoste
  - Beaugency
    - Higency
      - Nommeo
  - Chaparral
    - High Sierra
  - Nonancourt
  - Faldor
  - Ifniri
  - Tourangeau
  - Valdrague
  - Tourjours Pret
  - Stanleyville
  - Tennyson
    - Le Mamamouchi
    - Marasali
    - Full of Stars
  - Beauvallon
    - Dniepr
  - Thoreau
  - Olmeto
    - Jean d'Mour
  - Val de l'Orne
    - Ruscelli
    - Victory Zone
    - Valuable Witness
    - Truculent
      - Latmos
    - Val Dansant
      - Dorset Downs
    - Golden Choice
    - Pay the Butler
    - Baron de Vaux
    - River God
  - Avaray
    - Lucozade
