= Prix de Psyché =

Flat horse race in France

- Class: Group 3
- Location: Deauville Racecourse; Deauville, France
- Inaugurated: 1969
- Race type: Flat / Thoroughbred
- Website: france-galop.com

Race information
- Distance: 2,000 metres (1¼ miles)
- Surface: Turf
- Track: Right-handed
- Qualification: Three-year-old fillies exc. G2 winners this year
- Weight: 56 kg Penalties; 2 kg for Group 3 winners * * since January 1
- Purse: €56,000 (2020); 1st: €28,000

Prix de Psyché
2024
Almara	Uluru	Rock'n Swing

Previous years
2023
Excellent Truth	Left Sea	Empress Wu
2022
Trevaunance	Mqse De Sevigne	Life Of Dreams
2021
Penja	The Blue Brilliant	Mystery Angel

2020-2011
2020
Raabihah	Wangari	Alkandora
2019
Villa Marina	Edisa	Romanciere
2018
Homerique	Mascha	Impertinente
2017
Vue Fantastique	Listen In	Onthemoonagain
2016
Left Hand	Lakalas	Apple Betty
2015
Bourree	Sainte Amarante	Light The Stars
2014
Be My Gal	Anahita	Royalmania
2013
Tasaday	Sparkling Beam	Alumna
2012
Leaupartie	Romantica	Bugie D'Amore
2011
Dalarua	Dream Peace	Dorcas Lane

2010–2001
2010
Zagora	Bikini Babe	Rumoush
2009
Board Meeting	Proportional	Plumania
2008
Top Toss	Changing Skies	Proviso
2007
Vadapolina	Believe Me	Diyakalanie
2006
Chaibia	Lahudood	Mauralakana
2005
Satwa Queen	Viane Rose	Antique
2004
Quilanga	Kinnaird	Cloon
2003
Commercante	Baie	Mezzo Soprano
2002
Serisia	Melody Blue	Be Glad
2001
Luna Kya	Calista	Reine Zao

2000–1997
2000
Hidalguia	Fall Habit	Mosquera
1999
Welluna	Nordican Inch	Ares Vallis
1998
Bardonecchia	Insight	Lesgor
1997
Tenuous	Majinskaya	Enigma

The Prix de Psyché is a Group 3 flat horse race in France open to three-year-old thoroughbred fillies. It is run at Deauville over a distance of 2,000 metres (about 1¼ miles), and it is scheduled to take place each year in late July or early August.

The event is named after Psyche, a figure in Greek mythology, a character from a novel by Apuleius, and also the title of the play Psyché.

The race was established in 1969, and its conditions have remained unchanged since its creation. It was given Group 3 status in 1980.

== Records ==
Leading jockey (4 wins):

- Olivier Peslier – Agathe (1994), Sangria (1996), Vue Fantastique (2017), Villa Marina (2019)
- Yves Saint-Martin – Paulista (1974), Patia (1977), La Koumia (1985), Darara (1986)
- Pat Eddery – Sovereign Dona (1980), Zinzara (1982), Ashayer (1988), Alcando (1989)

Leading trainer (5 wins):

- François Boutin – My Great Aunt (1973), Pin Ball (1975), Antrona (1976), Lys River (1978), Lorymaya (1991)

Leading owner (4 wins):

- Daniel Wildenstein – Paulista (1974), Patia (1977), Agathe (1994), Sangria (1996)

== Winners since 1979 ==
Year	Winner	Jockey	Trainer	Owner	Time
1979	Liki Liki	Jean-Claude Desaint	J. C. Cunnington	George Ohrstrom
1980	Sovereign Dona	Pat Eddery	Stuart Murless	Walter Vischer	2:08.9
1981	Sangue	Alain Lequeux	Maurice Zilber	Naji Nahas
1982	Zinzara	Pat Eddery	Harry Wragg	Philip Oppenheimer
1983	Green Reef	Maurice Philipperon	John Cunnington Jr.	Mrs Raymond Adès
1984	Treizieme	Alain Lequeux	Maurice Zilber	Thomas P. Tatham
1985	La Koumia	Yves Saint-Martin	Robert Collet	Robert Sangster
1986	Darara	Yves Saint-Martin	Alain de Royer-Dupré	Aga Khan IV
1987	Invited Guest	Steve Cauthen	Robert Armstrong	Randall Dee Hubbard	2:05.0
1988	Ashayer	Pat Eddery	John Dunlop	Hamdan Al Maktoum	2:05.2
1989	Alcando	Pat Eddery	Charlie James	Nicholas Cowan	2:08.0
1990	Vue Cavaliere	Éric Legrix	Jean-Marie Béguigné	D. M. Kendall	2:10.2
1991	Lorymaya	Gérald Mossé	François Boutin	Jean-Luc Lagardère	2:08.8
1992	Palomelle	Olivier Doleuze	Antonio Spanu	Patrick Rayez	2:12.6
1993	Danse Royale	Lester Piggott	Michael Grassick	Patricia O'Kelly	2:07.0
1994	Agathe	Olivier Peslier	André Fabre	Daniel Wildenstein	2:07.6
1995	Angel in My Heart	Cash Asmussen	John Hammond	Stavros Niarchos	2:07.2
1996	Sangria	Olivier Peslier	André Fabre	Daniel Wildenstein	2:15.0
1997	Tenuous	Sylvain Guillot	Pascal Bary	Khalid Abdullah	2:11.0
1998	Bardonecchia	Vincenzo Mezzatesta	Luigi Camici	Villa Dosia SRL	2:10.5
1999	Welluna	Andrasch Starke	Hans Blume	Stall Kaiserberg	2:13.6
2000	Hidalguia	Gérald Mossé	Jean de Roualle	Enrique Sarasola	2:05.9
2001	Luna Kya	Jean-René Dubosc	Jean-Claude Rouget	Jean-Luc Lagardère	2:07.1
2002	Serisia	Thierry Thulliez	Pascal Bary	Lady O'Reilly	2:12.0
2003	Commercante	Ioritz Mendizabal	Jean-Marie Béguigné	Ecurie Fabien Ouaki	2:06.8
2004	Quilanga	Gary Stevens	Andreas Wöhler	Gestüt Fährhof	2:08.0
2005	Satwa Queen	Éric Legrix	Jean de Roualle	Steven & Gillian Lamprell	2:10.3
2006	Chaibia	Dominique Boeuf	David Smaga	Malcolm Parrish	2:07.5
2007	Vadapolina	Stéphane Pasquier	André Fabre	Aga Khan IV	2:07.4
2008	Top Toss	Christophe Soumillon	Yves de Nicolay	Ecurie Skymarc Farm	2:09.8
2009	Board Meeting	Anthony Crastus	Élie Lellouche	Ecurie Wildenstein	2:05.0
2010	Zagora	Ioritz Mendizabal	Jean-Claude Rouget	Martin S. Schwartz	2:05.0
2011	Dalarua	Stéphane Pasquier	Stéphane Wattel	Haras de la Perelle	2:06.2
2012	Leaupartie	Gregory Benoist	Fabrice Chappet	Gerard Augustin-Normand	2:04.3
2013	Tasaday	Pierre-Charles Boudot	André Fabre	Godolphin	2:09.07
2014	Be My Gal	Frankie Dettori	Roger Charlton	John Deer	2:03.87
2015	Bourree	Eddy Hardouin	Andreas Lowe	Stall Lenau	2:05.93
2016	Left Hand	Maxime Guyon	Carlos Laffon-Parias	Wertheimer et Frère	2:07.87
2017	Vue Fantastique	Olivier Peslier	Fabrice Chappet	Martin S. Schwartz	2:05.30
2018	Homerique	Pierre-Charles Boudot	Fancis-Henri Graffard	Ecurie de Montlahuc	2:08.12
2019	Villa Marina	Olivier Peslier	Carlos Laffon-Parias	Sarl Darpat France	2:09.59
2020	Raabihah	Cristian Demuro	Jean-Claude Rouget	Hamdan Al Maktoum	2:02.81
2021	Penja	Cristian Demuro	Jean-Claude Rouget	Daniel-Yves Treves	2:07.66
2022	Trevaunance	Shane Foley	Jessica Harrington	Moyglare Stud	2:07.10

== Earlier winners ==
- 1970: Popkins
- 1971: Albany
- 1972: San San
- 1973: My Great Aunt
- 1974: Paulista
- 1975: Pin Ball
- 1976: Antrona
- 1977: Patia
- 1978: Lys River

== See also ==
- List of French flat horse races

== See also ==
- France Galop
- Racing Post
