= Golden Choice =

Canadian-bred Thoroughbred racehorse

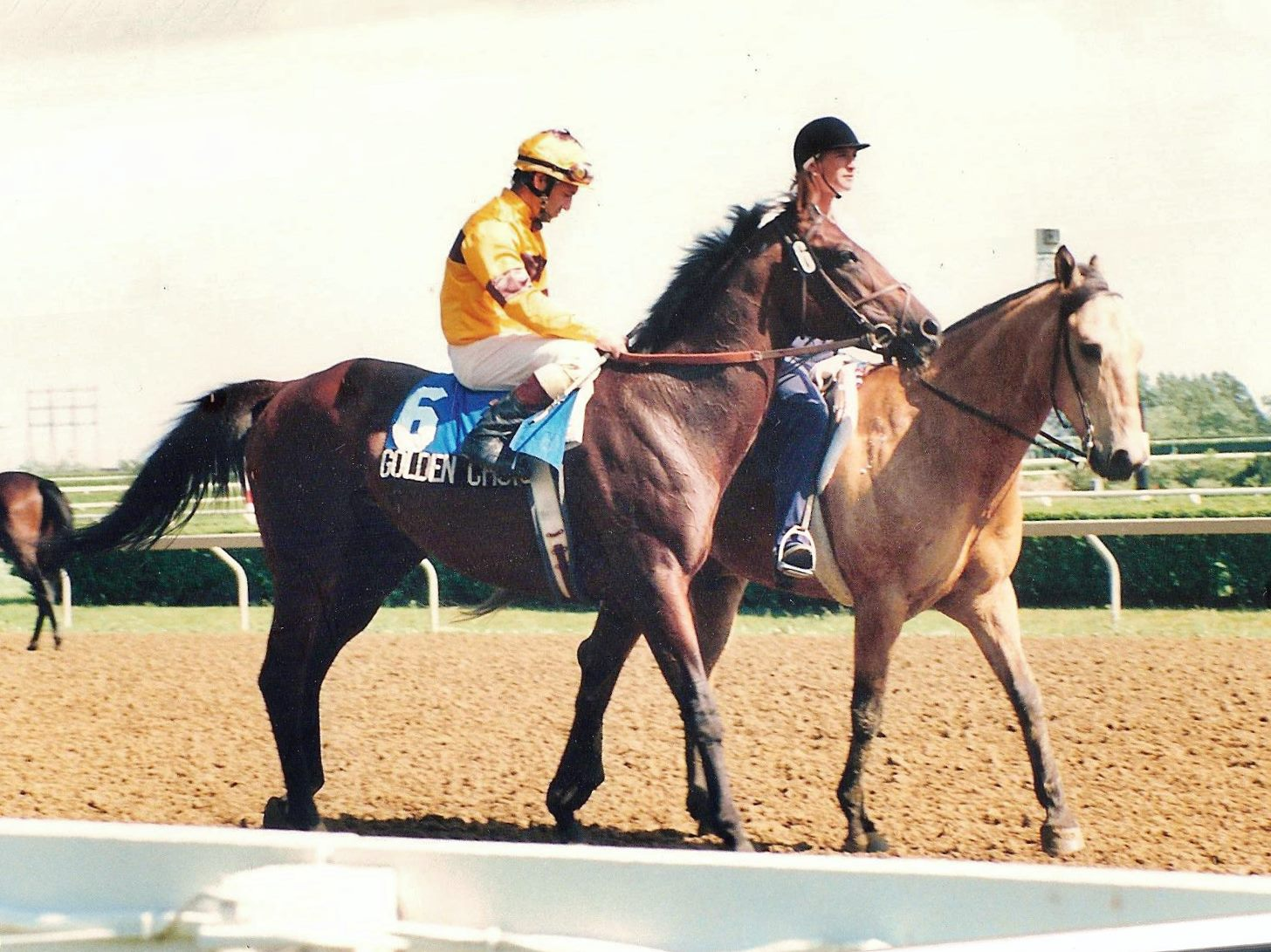
- 1988 book by Dick Sanderson
- Sire: Val de l'Orne
- Grandsire: Val de Loir
- Dam: Your My Choice
- Damsire: Barachois
- Sex: Stallion
- Foaled: 1983
- Country: Canada
- Colour: Bay
- Breeder: Windfields Farm
- Owner: Dick Sanderson & Gerry Belanger
- Trainer: Michael A. Tammaro
- Record: 21: 6-3-4
- Earnings: $504,674

Major wins
- Queen's Plate (1986); Prince of Wales Stakes (1986); Niagara Stakes (1986)

Awards
- Canadian Champion 3-Yr-Old Colt (1986)
- Last updated on November 1, 2007

Golden Choice (foaled 1983) is a Canadian Thoroughbred racehorse best known for winning Canada's most prestigious horse race, the Queen's Plate. Sired by Val de l'Orne, the 1975 Prix du Jockey Club winner, his damsire was Barachois, a son of Northern Dancer. Golden Choice was purchased as a yearling for $60,000 at the Canadian Thoroughbred Horse Society (CTHS) sale at Woodbine.

Racing as a three-year-old, he finished third in the 1986 Plate Trial Stakes and then won the first two legs of the Canadian Triple Crown. The Queen's Plate was the first ever win for Golden Choice, who then defeated the great filly Carotene to capture the Prince of Wales Stakes. However, in the final leg of the Triple Crown series, he finished third to Carotene. Among his other victories in 1986, Golden Choice won the Niagara Breeders' Cup Stakes. His performances that year earned him the Sovereign Award for Champion 3-Year-Old Male Horse.

His co-owner, Richard "Dick" Sanderson, wrote a book about Golden Choice titled The Choice was GOLDEN :The True Story of a Racehorse. Noted ABC sportscaster Jim McKay said of the book: "There are more good stories in horse racing than in any other sport. This is one of them."
