= Relaxing (horse) =

American-bred Thoroughbred racehorse

- Sire: Buckpasser
- Grandsire: Tom Fool
- Dam: Marking Time
- Damsire: To Market
- Sex: Mare
- Foaled: 1976
- Country: United States
- Colour: Bay
- Breeder: Ogden Phipps
- Owner: Ogden Phipps
- Trainer: John Dunlop (UK) and Angel Penna (US)
- Record: 28: 13-2-5
- Earnings: $589,195

Major wins
- Firenze Handicap (1980); Gallant Fox Handicap (1980); Ruffian Handicap (1981); Delaware Handicap (1981); John B. Campbell Handicap (1981); Assault Handicap (1981)

Awards
- U.S. Champion Older Female (1981); Kentucky Broodmare of the Year (1989)
- Last updated on 9 November 2011

Relaxing was a bay thoroughbred born in 1976 at the Ogden Phipps stud farm in Kentucky. She was a stakes winner and an outstanding broodmare.

== Racing ==
As a youngster, Relaxing was sent to England to race. At the age of three years, she had four wins and one second out of nine races on turf before she returned to America to race on the U.S.'s dirt tracks. In 1980, at age four, she started twelve times, winning five races, and set a new track record for going 1 5/8 miles in 2:42.2 during her victory against colts in the Gallant Fox Handicap (Gr-2). Relaxing also equaled a track record in the Firenze Handicap (Gr-2). In 1981, as a five-year-old, she was named Eclipse Champion Older Mare. That year, she won the Ruffian Handicap (Gr-1) and Delaware Handicap (Gr-1). She also beat males in the John B. Campbell Handicap (Gr-2) and the ungraded Assault Handicap besides finishing third to John Henry in the Jockey Club Gold by less than a length.

== Broodmare career ==
As a broodmare, Relaxing produced twelve foals, nine of which started. The most famous one was champion Easy Goer, who is best known for his rivalry with Sunday Silence during the Triple Crown of 1989. Her daughters Easy Now and Cadillacing were both Grade 1 winners, and Cadillacing became a successful broodmare. Relaxing was voted Kentucky Broodmare of the Year in 1989.

Relaxing died in May 1999 at the age of 23 from foaling complications. She was buried in Claiborne Farm's horse cemetery.
