= Nobiliary =

American-bred Thoroughbred racehorse

- Sire: Vaguely Noble
- Grandsire: Vienna
- Dam: Goofed
- Damsire: Court Martial
- Sex: Mare
- Foaled: 14 February 1972
- Country: United States
- Colour: Chestnut
- Breeder: Nelson Bunker Hunt
- Owner: Nelson Bunker Hunt
- Trainer: Maurice Zilber
- Record: 13:4-4-3

Major wins
- Prix de la Grotte (1975); Prix Saint-Alary (1975); Washington, D.C.International (1975)

Awards
- Timeform rating 112 (1974), 131 (1975)

Nobiliary (foaled 14 February 1972) was an American-bred, French-trained Thoroughbred racehorse and broodmare. She recorded her biggest win in the Washington, D.C.International in 1975, a year in which she became (and remains) the only filly since 1916 to finish placed in the Derby Stakes. As a two-year-old she won one minor race but showed promised when finishing sixth in the Grand Critérium and third in the Prix des Réservoirs. In the following year she won the Group Three Prix de la Grotte and was thereafter campaigned exclusively in Group One/ Grade I company. She won the Prix Saint-Alary and was placed in the Poule d'Essai des Pouliches, Epsom Derby, Irish Oaks and Prix Vermeille before ending her career with a win in the Washington, D.C.International. She had no success as a broodmare, producing only two foals.

== Background ==
Nobiliary was a "strong, attractive" chestnut mare with a small white star bred in Kentucky by her owner Nelson Bunker Hunt. Her sire, Vaguely Noble, won the Prix de l'Arc de Triomphe in 1968 before becoming a successful breeding stallion whose best progeny included Dahlia, Exceller and Empery. Nobiliary's dam Goofed won four races and became a highly successful broodmare, also producing the outstanding racehorse and sire Lyphard and the Bowling Green Handicap winner Barcas. Nobiliary was sent to race in Europe where she was trained in France by Maurice Zilber.

== Racing career ==
=== 1974: two-year-old season ===
Nobiliary ran four times as a two-year-old in 1974. After finishing third over 1400 metres on her racecourse debut she won a maiden race over 1700 metres at Longchamp Racecourse in September, beating Beautiful Sea by one and a half lengths. She was then moved up sharply in class and matched against colts when she contested France's most prestigious race for juveniles, the Grand Critérium over 1600 metres at Longchamp on 13 October. Ridden by Maurice Philipperon she started at odds of 13/1 and finished sixth of the ten runners, nine lengths behind the winner Mariacci. On her final appearance of the season she finished third behind Dona Barod and Good Start in the Prix des Réservoirs over the same course and distance.

=== 1975: three-year-old season ===
==== Spring ====
Nobiliary began her three-year-old season in the Prix de la Grotte over 1600 metres at Longchamp in April and won by a length from Lighted Glory, a filly who went on to finish fifth in the 1000 Guineas. On 4 May, Nobiliary, accompanied by her pacemaker Amata, started 3/1 second favourite for the Poule d'Essai des Pouliches over the same course and distance. Ridden by the British jockey Lester Piggott, she took the lead from Amata in the straight but was overtaken in the closing stages and was beaten one and a half lengths, with the odds-on favourite Broadway Dancer six lengths back in third place. The filly was then moved up in distance for the Prix Saint-Alary over 2000 metres on 25 May. Again ridden by Piggott she started the 8/5 favourite and recorded her first Group One win, beating Lighted Glory by two lengths.

==== Summer ====
In a highly unusual move, Nobiliary was then sent to England and was matched against colts for the 196th running of the Epsom Derby, a race in which no filly had finished in the first three since Fifinella won a wartime version in 1916. Ridden by Yves Saint-Martin she ran on strongly in the straight to finish second to Grundy, three lengths behind the winner and four lengths clear of Hunza Dancer in third. Maurice Zilber later expressed the view that Nobilary could have won the race if Saint-Martin had made more use of the filly's stamina. Nobiliary was scheduled for a rematch with Ivanjica in the Prix de Diane but when the race was abandoned owing to industrial action by stable staff, she was rerouted to the Eclipse Stakes at Sandown Park Racecourse. As well as being matched against older horses for the first time, she was racing on firmer ground than she had previously encountered. She looked very unsettled before the start and after racing prominently for most of the race but looked outpaced in the closing stages and finished fifth behind the German horse Star Appeal. Nobiliary returned to one and a half miles for a clash with The Oaks winner Juliette Marny in the Irish Oaks at the Curragh Racecourse on 18 July. Piggott opted to ride Juliette Marny, the 5/2 favourite, whilst Nobiliary, ridden by Billy Pyers started at 3/1. Nobiliary moved into second place early in the straight but could make no further progress and eventually finished third, beaten a neck and two lengths Juliette Marny and Tuscarora.

==== Autumn ====
On her return from a summer break, Nobiliary started second favourite behind Ivanjica for the Prix Vermeille on 21 September, a race which also attracted the Oaks d'Italia winner Carnauba and the British filly May Hill, who defeated Juliette Marny in the Yorkshire Oaks. The finish of the race was similar to that of the Poule d'Essai des Pouliches with Nobiliary taking the lead in the straight before being outsprinted by Ivanjica and beaten one and a half lengths. The pair finished eight lengths clear of May Hill in third. In France's most prestigious horse race, the Prix de l'Arc de Triomphe at Longchamp on 5 October, she was coupled in the betting with Nelson Bunker Hunt's five-year-old mare Dahlia, and the pair started fourth in the betting on 8.75/1. Ridden by Pyers, she disputed the lead from the start before being overtaken 300 metres from the finish and eventually finished sixth behind Star Appeal. Pyers, who had been unseated by Nobiliary before the start, received some criticism for failing to exercise more restraint on the filly in the early stages.

On 8 November Nobiliary and Dahlia started joint-second favourites for the 24th running of the Washington, D.C.International at Laurel Park Racecourse in Maryland. The market was headed by Snow Knight who had won the Epsom Derby in 1974, before being transferred to North America where he had won several major races including the Man o' War Stakes, Manhattan Handicap and Canadian International Championship. The other contenders included Star Appeal from Germany, Laomedonte from Italy, Comtesse de Loir and On My Way from France, Tsukisamu Homare from Japan and Shady Character representing the United States. With her intended jockey Yves Saint-Martin unable to ride at 117 pounds, Nobiliary was ridden by the Canadian Sandy Hawley. Hawley sent the filly into the lead from the start and set a very fast pace, with only Shady Character attempting to match her early speed: at one point the pair went seven lengths clear of the field making it appear to some observers that she was being employed as a pacemaker for Dahlia. Several challengers emerged on the final turn but Nobiliary rallied strongly in the straight and Comtesse de Loir emerged as her only serious danger. In the final strides Nobiliary edged away from the rail, slightly hampering Comtesse de Loir but prevailed to win by three-quarters of a length, with On My Way taking third place to complete a clean sweep of the places for French-trained horses.

== Assessment ==
There was no International Classification of European two-year-olds in 1974: the official handicappers of Britain, Ireland and France compiled separate rankings for horses which competed in those countries. In the official French handicap, Nobiliary was rated fourteen pounds inferior to the top-rated Mariacci and twelve pounds below the top filly Broadway Dancer. The independent Timeform organisation gave her a rating of 112, nineteen pounds below Broadway Dancer. In their annual Racehorses of 1974, Timeform described her as certain to stay one and a half miles and "the type to do well at 3 yrs". In the official French handicap for 1975, Nobiliary was rated the second best three-year-old filly of the year behind Ivanjica. Timeform gave her a rating of 131, making her their third-best three-year-old filly behind Rose Bowl (133) and Ivanjica (132).

== Breeding record ==
It was expected that Nobiliary would remain in training as a four-year-old but she never raced again after her win at Laurel Park and was retired to become a broodmare. She was unsuccessful in her new role, producing only two recorded foals: Winnsboro (a bay filly, foaled in 1979, sired by Youth) and Libillary (a bay colt, foaled in 1983, sired by Liloy) neither of whom made any impact as racehorses. At Nelson Bunker Hunt's dispersal sale in 1988, she was sold for $325,000 to the Allez France Stable, but never produced another foal.

== Pedigree ==
Pedigree of Nobiliary (USA), chestnut mare, 1972
Sire Vaguely Noble (IRE) 1965	Vienna (GB); 1957	Aureole	Hyperion
Sire Vaguely Noble (IRE) 1965	Vienna (GB); 1957	Aureole	Angelola
Sire Vaguely Noble (IRE) 1965	Vienna (GB); 1957	Turkish Blood	Turkhan
Sire Vaguely Noble (IRE) 1965	Vienna (GB); 1957	Turkish Blood	Rusk
Sire Vaguely Noble (IRE) 1965	Noble Lassie (GB); 1956	Nearco	Pharos
Sire Vaguely Noble (IRE) 1965	Noble Lassie (GB); 1956	Nearco	Nogara
Sire Vaguely Noble (IRE) 1965	Noble Lassie (GB); 1956	Belle Sauvage	Big Game
Sire Vaguely Noble (IRE) 1965	Noble Lassie (GB); 1956	Belle Sauvage	Tropical Sun
Dam Goofed (USA) 1960	Court Martial (GB); 1942	Fair Trial	Fairway
Dam Goofed (USA) 1960	Court Martial (GB); 1942	Fair Trial	Lady Juror
Dam Goofed (USA) 1960	Court Martial (GB); 1942	Instantaneous	Hurry On
Dam Goofed (USA) 1960	Court Martial (GB); 1942	Instantaneous	Picture
Dam Goofed (USA) 1960	Barra (FR); 1950	Formor	Ksar
Dam Goofed (USA) 1960	Barra (FR); 1950	Formor	Formose
Dam Goofed (USA) 1960	Barra (FR); 1950	La Favorite	Biribi
Dam Goofed (USA) 1960	Barra (FR); 1950	La Favorite	La Pompadour (Family: 17-b)
