= Star Appeal =

Irish-bred, German-trained Thoroughbred racehorse

- Sire: Appiani II
- Grandsire: Herbager
- Dam: Sterna
- Damsire: Neckar
- Sex: Stallion
- Foaled: 1970
- Country: Ireland
- Colour: Bay
- Breeder: Gestut Röttgen
- Owner: Waldemar Zeitelhack
- Trainer: John Oxx; Anton Pohlkotter; Theo Grieper
- Record: 39: 11-4-8
- Earnings: 1,493,413 DM + $5,000 in USA

Major wins
- Preis der Stadt Baden-Baden (1973); G. P. der Badischen Wirtschaft (1974, 1975); Frankfurt Pokal (1974); Premio Carlo d'Alessio (1974); Eclipse Stakes (1975); Gran Premio di Milano (1975); Prix de l'Arc de Triomphe (1975)

Honours
- Timeform rating: 133; German Horse of the Year (1975); Star Appeal Stakes
- Last updated on 18 June 2022

Star Appeal (1970–1987) was an Irish-bred Thoroughbred and sire who won top-class races in four countries. In 1975, he became the first German-trained racehorse to win the Prix de l'Arc de Triomphe.

== Racing career ==
Star Appeal was initially raced in Ireland, where his first trainer was John Oxx senior. He then moved to Germany where he achieved success with his third trainer, Theo Grieper.

Star Appeal was a horse who campaigned in major races at home and across Europe. Among Star Appeal's wins were back-to-back editions of the Grosser Preis der Badischen Wirtschaft and the Frankfurt Pokal in Germany, Italy's Premio Carlo d'Alessio and Premio Carlo d'Alessio, England's Eclipse Stakes , and the most important win of his career at Longchamp Racecourse in Paris, France, the Prix de l'Arc de Triomphe. Ridden by Greville Starkey, he won the Prix de l'Arc de Triomphe at odds of 118:1, defeating a large field which included the great Dahlia and Allez France. For his 1975 performances, Star Appeal was rated the 1975 European Horse of the Year.

== Stud record ==
Retired from racing following a fifth-place finish to Nobiliary in the Washington, D.C. International Stakes at Laurel Park Racecourse in the United States, Star Appeal served stallion duty at the English National Stud. He sired such good runners as Kamiros II, Madam Gay, and Star Way.

Star Appeal died at age seventeen on 25 December 1987.

== Sire line tree ==
- Star Appeal
  - Star Way
    - Sky Chase
      - Saintly
    - Filante
  - Kamiros
