= San San (horse) =

American-bred Thoroughbred racehorse

- Sire: Bald Eagle
- Grandsire: Nasrullah
- Dam: Sail Navy
- Damsire: Princequillo
- Sex: Filly
- Foaled: 1969
- Country: United States
- Colour: Dark Bay
- Breeder: Harry F. Guggenheim
- Owner: Countess Margit Batthyany. Colors: Dark blue, orange sleeves, black cap.
- Trainer: Angel Penna, Sr.
- Record: 22: 5-6-0
- Earnings: $413,659

Major wins
- Prix Vermeille (1972); Prix de Psyché (1972); Prix de l'Arc de Triomphe (1972)
- Last updated on December 18, 2006

San San was an American-bred Thoroughbred Champion racehorse in France. Bred by Harry F. Guggenheim, the granddaughter of Nasrullah was bought by Countess Margit Batthyany, owner of Haras du Bois-Roussel at Alençon, Orne, in France.

Racing at age two and three, San San finished second six times and had five wins. Her first important victory came in 1972 in the Group One Prix Vermeille in which she was ridden by Jean Cruguet who would shortly leave for America where he would ride Seattle Slew to victory in the U.S. Triple Crown races. In October, San San was ridden by leading French jockey Freddy Head when she won France's most prestigious race, the Prix de l'Arc de Triomphe. In the 1½ mile long Arc, she defeated Rescousse to whom she had earlier been second in the Prix de la Nonette.

She was sent to compete in the Washington, D.C. International at Laurel Park in Laurel, Maryland, but was badly hampered by the fall of one her opponents and finished fourth behind Droll Role.

After her retirement from racing San San was exported to become a broodmare in Japan.
