= Angel Penna Sr. =

Argentine horse trainer (1923–1992)

Personal information
- Born: September 30, 1923 Buenos Aires, Argentina
- Died: January 15, 1992 (aged 68)
- Occupation: Trainer

Horse racing career
- Sport: Horse racing
- Career wins: Not found

Major racing wins
- Roamer Handicap (1969); Massachusetts Handicap (1970); Tremont Stakes (1970); Hollywood Derby (1971); Lexington Handicap (1971); Travers Stakes (1971); Prix de Diane (1973); Prix d'Ispahan (1973, 1974); Prix Ganay (1974, 1975); K. George VI & Q. Elizabeth Stakes (1976); Poule d'Essai des Pouliches (1977); Turf Classic (1978); Widener Handicap (1980); Gulfstream Park Handicap (1980); United Nations Stakes (1980, 1988); Fort Marcy Handicap (1981, 1988); Beldame Stakes (1983); Rothmans International Stakes (1986); Royal Palm Handicap (1989) French Classic Race wins: Prix de l'Arc de Triomphe (1972, 1974) British Classic Race wins: Epsom Oaks (1976); St. Leger Stakes (1976); 1,000 Guineas (1976)

Racing awards
- Leading Trainer in Argentina (1952); Leading Trainer in Venezuela (1954); Leading Trainer in France (1974)

Honors
- United States Racing Hall of Fame (1988)

Significant horses
- Allez France, Blitey, Bold Reason, Crow, Flying Water, Pawneese, Relaxing, San San, Waya

Angel A. Penna Sr. (September 30, 1923 – January 15, 1992) was an Argentine-born U. S. Racing Hall of Fame Thoroughbred horse trainer. Penna was an international trainer who worked and raced on three continents. He conditioned more than 250 graded stakes race winners during a career that began in 1950 and lasted for more than forty years.

Born in Buenos Aires to a racing family, Angel Penna's father, father-in-law, and an uncle were all horse trainers. Angel Penna worked as an assistant to his father until going out on his own in 1942.

He won leading trainer honors in his native Argentina in 1952 and in Venezuela in 1954 then began competing in the United States. After moving permanently to the U.S. in 1961 he raced at tracks from coast to coast and was notably successful with Harry F. Guggenheim's colt, Bold Reason. In 1972, Angel Penna went to France, where he would become a major figure in European Thoroughbred racing.

Penna won the 1972 Prix de l'Arc de Triomphe with the filly San San. Hired by leading French horseman Daniel Wildenstein, Penna won his second Arc in 1974 with the future Hall of Fame filly Allez France and earned French Leading Trainer honors that year. In addition to capturing important Group One races in France, Penna also raced Wildenstein's horses in the United Kingdom where he won three of that country's Classic Races.

Angel Penna returned to the United States in 1978 with Daniel Wildenstein horses including Waya with whom he won that year's Turf Classic and Man O' War Stakes. He was soon hired by renowned American horse owner Ogden Phipps for whom he trained Relaxing, the 1981 U.S. Champion Older Female and won a number of important stakes races.

In 1988, Angel Penna Sr. was inducted into the United States' National Museum of Racing and Hall of Fame. He was living in Old Westbury, New York, at the time of his death in 1992. His son Angel Penna Jr. (born 1948) is also a successful trainer working in the U.S. who was the New York Thoroughbred Breeders' Trainer of the Year in 1995.

== Selected Group One European wins ==
- Prix de l'Arc de Triomphe : San San (1972), Allez France (1974)
- Poule d'Essai des Pouliches : Madelia (1977)
- Prix de Diane : Allez France (1973)
- Prix d'Ispahan : Allez France (1973 & 1974)
- Prix Ganay : Allez France (1974 & 1975)
- King George VI and Queen Elizabeth Stakes : Pawneese (1976)
- Epsom Oaks : Pawneese (1976)
- St. Leger Stakes : Crow (1976)
- 1,000 Guineas : Flying Water (1976)
- Coronation Cup : Crow (1978)

== Selected Grade I North American wins ==
- Travers Stakes : Bold Reason (1971)
- Hollywood Derby : Bold Reason (1971)
- Turf Classic : Waya (1978)
- Widener Handicap: Private Account (1980)
- Gulfstream Park Handicap (1980)
- Beldame Stakes : Dance Number (1983)
- Flamingo Stakes : Time For A Change (1984)
- Rothmans International Stakes : Southjet (1986)
