= Vieux Manoir =

French-bred Thoroughbred racehorse

- Sire: Brantôme
- Grandsire: Blandford
- Dam: Vieille Maison
- Damsire: Finglas
- Sex: Stallion
- Foaled: 1947
- Country: France
- Colour: Bay
- Breeder: Haras de Meautry
- Owner: 1) Edouard A. de Rothschild; 2) Guy de Rothschild (1950)
- Trainer: Geoffroy Watson
- Record: 5: 3-?-?
- Earnings: US73,119 (equivalent)

Major wins
- Grand Prix de Paris (1950)

Awards
- Leading sire in France (1958)

Vieux Manoir (1947–1981) was a French Thoroughbred racehorse and Champion sire.

== Background ==
Bred by Baron Edouard A. de Rothschild and raced by his son Guy following his death in 1949. Members of the prominent Rothschild banking family of France, they owned Haras de Meautry breeding farm in Touques, Calvados where Vieux Manoir was foaled. Vieux Manoir was trained by Frenchman, Geoffroy Watson, a member of the renowned English Racing Colony in Chantilly.

== Racing career ==
Vieux Manoir most notably won the 1950 French Classic, the Grand Prix de Paris, and was second in the British Classic, the St. Leger Stakes.

== Stud record ==
Retired to stud, Vieux Manoir was the leading sire in France in 1958. His best-known progeny was Val de Loir, whose wins included the Classic Prix du Jockey Club in 1962 and who became a three-time leading sire in France as well as a Leading broodmare sire in Great Britain & Ireland. Another son, Le Haar, sired Exbury and Niksar and was the leading sire in France in 1963. Through Vieux Manoir's daughter, Agujita, he is the damsire of the international superstar filly and U.S. Racing Hall of Fame inductee, All Along. And, through another daughter, Astuce, he is the damsire of the 1976 Prix de l'Arc de Triomphe winner, Ivanjica.

Vieux Manoir died at age thirty-four in 1981.

== Sire line tree ==
- Vieux Manoir
  - Le Haar
    - Exbury
      - Zamazaan
        - Good Lord
        - Happy Union
        - Bright Halo
        - Exemplify
        - Affinity
        - Phizam
        - Veloso
        - Laud Eulogy
        - Samasaan
        - Lord Reims
        - Sir Zephyr
        - Il Comandante
        - Beau Zam
        - Mr Bunnythorpe
        - Zamoff
      - Ex Libris
      - Five Arrows
      - Calshot Light
      - Dungaree
        - Reca
      - Madison Palace
      - Exceptionnel
        - Kotare Chief
      - Poil de Chameau
      - Crow
      - Smuggler
      - Xibury
      - Soleil Noir
      - Ataxerxus
      - Chicbury
      - Julius Caesar
        - Runway Romance
      - What A Joy
    - Duc de Gueldre
    - Veronese
      - Alcamo
      - Fidyi
      - Latmos
      - Fernet
      - Conte Pescaor
      - Jerez
    - Niksar
      - Sabreur
      - Detonator
    - Trictrac
      - El Mondo
        - El Dufus
      - Balmerino
        - Bounty Hawk
        - Globetrotter
        - Eastern Classic
        - Linc The Leopard
        - Rocket Racer
        - Balciano
        - Snow Chief
        - Kessem
        - Donegal Mist
    - Agar
    - Frontal
      - Benedikt
      - Issus
      - Belespirit
      - Ocos
      - Ordos
    - Ramsin
    - Corps A Corps
  - Mon Manoir
    - Creation
  - Mourne
    - Snob
      - Batitu
      - Goodly
    - Frontin
    - Garde Coeur
    - Greyhound
    - Demi Deuil
    - Thataboy
    - Rock Roi
    - Galant Prince
    - My Mourne
      - Batallador
    - Azorello
    - Rouser
  - Cherasco
  - Coup de Canon
  - San Roman
    - Tequendama
  - Grand Shelem
  - Adoneo
  - Vik
    - Zorba
  - Tang
    - Arnaldo
  - Val de Loir
    - Val d'Aoste
    - Beaugency
      - Higency
        - Nommeo
    - Chaparral
      - High Sierra
    - Nonancourt
    - Faldor
    - Ifniri
    - Tourangeau
    - Valdrague
    - Tourjours Pret
    - Stanleyville
    - Tennyson
      - Le Mamamouchi
      - Marasali
      - Full of Stars
    - Beauvallon
      - Dniepr
    - Thoreau
    - Olmeto
      - Jean d'Mour
    - Val de l'Orne
      - Ruscelli
      - Victory Zone
      - Valuable Witness
      - Truculent
        - Latmos
      - Val Dansant
        - Dorset Downs
      - Golden Choice
      - Pay the Butler
      - Baron de Vaux
      - River God
    - Avaray
      - Lucozade
  - Gai Logis
  - Michelozzo
