= Niksar (horse) =

French-bred Thoroughbred racehorse

- Sire: Le Haar
- Grandsire: Vieux Manoir
- Dam: Niskampe
- Damsire: Shikampur
- Sex: Stallion
- Foaled: 1962
- Country: France
- Colour: Chestnut
- Breeder: Marquis de Nicolay
- Owner: Wilfred Harvey
- Trainer: Walter Nightingall
- Record: 10:2-0-2

Major wins
- 2000 Guineas Trial Stakes (1965); 2000 Guineas (1965)

Awards
- Timeform rating

Niksar (1962–1980) was a French-bred, British-trained Thoroughbred racehorse and sire, best known for winning the classic 2000 Guineas in 1965. After failing to win as a two-year-old he won his first race of 1965 by six lengths before winning the Guineas at Newmarket Racecourse. He failed to win in his remaining five starts and was retired at the end of the season with a record of two wins and two places from ten starts. He had moderate success as a breeding stallion in Australia and Japan.

== Background ==
Niksar was a chestnut horse with a narrow white blaze bred in France by the Marquis de Nicolay. As a yearling, Niksar was sent to the sales at Deauville where he was bought by representatives the British businessman Wilfred Harvey for 64,000 NF (approximately £4,650). Harvey sent the colt into training with Walter Nightingall, near Epsom Downs Racecourse. Nightingall had been training at his South Hatch stable since 1919, and had his greatest success when Straight Deal won a wartime substitute Derby at Newmarket in 1943.

Niksar was sired by Le Haar, the winner of the 1957 Prix Jean Prat, who was best known as the sire of the Prix de l'Arc de Triomphe winner Exbury. He was the first foal of his dam, Niskampe, who won seven minor races from forty-two starts.

== Racing career ==
=== 1964:two-year-old season ===
As a two-year-old in 1964, Niksar ran three times but failed to win a race. His best effort came on his second start, when he finished third to the American-bred colt Audience in the Crookham Stakes (since renamed the Mill Reef Stakes) over seven furlongs at Newbury Racecourse.

=== 1965:three-year-old season ===
On his three-year-old debut, Niksar was sent to Kempton Park in April for the 2000 Guineas Trial Stakes over one mile. He showed much improved form as he won by six lengths from Streetfighter, with Audience unplaced. In the 2000 Guineas, over Newmarket's Rowley Mile course on 28 April, Niksar started at odds of 100/8 in a field of twenty-two runners. From half way the race developed into a contest between Niksar and the favourite Silly Season, with the two colts racing on opposite sides of the wide Newmarket straight. Ridden by the Scottish jockey Duncan Keith, Niksar appeared ideally suited by the soft, wet ground conditions and prevailed by a length with the French-trained Présent in third place.

Niksar was then moved up in distance to contest the Derby at his home course Epsom. The colt was regarded as a major contender, and his status was enhanced when his name was chalked on the "Amato well" shortly before the race. In the build-up to the race there was a rumour that Niksar was the target of a gang which intended to prevent him from running, leading Nightingall to employ security guards and install an "electronic device" to detect intruders. On the night before the Derby an attempt was made to enter the colt's stable, but the intruders were repelled by the guards, with a shotgun being fired during the fracas. Niksar started at odds of 100/8 (as in the Guineas) and finished fourth of the twenty-two runners behind Sea-Bird, Meadow Court and I Say (also trained by Nightingall). Niksar's subsequent form deteriorated, as he finished fourth behind Meadow Court in both the Irish Derby and unplaced behind the same horse in the King George VI and Queen Elizabeth Stakes. He reverted to the one mile distance for the Sussex Stakes at Goodwood Racecourse but finished fourth behind the Irish-trained winner Carlemont. On his final appearance Niksar ran in the Champion Stakes at Newmarket in October, and showed slightly better form to finish third behind Silly Season and the Italian filly Tadolina.

== Assessment ==
In their book A Century of Champions, based on a modified version of the Timeform system, John Randall and Tony Morris rated Niksar an "inferior" winner of the 2000 Guineas.

== Stud record ==
At the end of his three-year-old season, Niksar was sold by Harvey and exported to stand as a breeding stallion in Australia. The most successful of his progeny included Detonator (Railway Stakes) and Sabreur (Tasmanian Derby). In 1972 he was sold again and moved to Japan where he died in 1980.

== Pedigree ==
Pedigree of Niksar (FR), chestnut stallion, 1962
Sire Le Haar (FR) 1954	Vieux Manoir (FR); 1947	Brantôme	Blandford*
Sire Le Haar (FR) 1954	Vieux Manoir (FR); 1947	Brantôme	Vitamine*
Sire Le Haar (FR) 1954	Vieux Manoir (FR); 1947	Vieille Maison	Finglas
Sire Le Haar (FR) 1954	Vieux Manoir (FR); 1947	Vieille Maison	Vieille Canaille
Sire Le Haar (FR) 1954	Mince Pie (FR); 1949	Teleferique	Bacteriophage
Sire Le Haar (FR) 1954	Mince Pie (FR); 1949	Teleferique	Beaute de Neige
Sire Le Haar (FR) 1954	Mince Pie (FR); 1949	Cannelle	Biribi
Sire Le Haar (FR) 1954	Mince Pie (FR); 1949	Cannelle	Armoise*
Dam Niskampe (FR) 1955	Shikampur (IRE); 1950	Tehran	Bois Roussel
Dam Niskampe (FR) 1955	Shikampur (IRE); 1950	Tehran	Stafaralla
Dam Niskampe (FR) 1955	Shikampur (IRE); 1950	Mehmany	Mieuxce
Dam Niskampe (FR) 1955	Shikampur (IRE); 1950	Mehmany	Dulce
Dam Niskampe (FR) 1955	Nise (FR); 1944	Nino	Clarissimus*
Dam Niskampe (FR) 1955	Nise (FR); 1944	Nino	Azalee
Dam Niskampe (FR) 1955	Nise (FR); 1944	Frileuse	Mousson
Dam Niskampe (FR) 1955	Nise (FR); 1944	Frileuse	Gallia (Family 7)

* Niksar is inbred 4S x 5D to the stallion Blandford, meaning that he appears fourth generation on the sire side of his pedigree, and fifth generation (via Armoise) on the dam side of his pedigree.

* Niksar is inbred 5S x 4D to the stallion Clarissimus, meaning that he appears fifth generation (via Vitamine) on the sire side of his pedigree, and fourth generation on the dam side of his pedigree.
