= Brent Thomson =

New Zealand jockey

Personal information
- Born: Wanganui, New Zealand

Horse racing career
- Sport: Horse racing

Major racing wins
- WRC George Adams Handicap (1974); Cox Plate (1975, 1977, 1978, 1979); Auckland Cup (1976); LKS Mackinnon Stakes (1977, 1978, 1979); Railway Handicap (1978); Underwood Stakes (1978, 1982, 1988, 1993); Victoria Derby (1978); VRC Sprint Classic (1978); Rosehill Guineas (1979); Australian Derby (1979); Adelaide Cup (1980, 1988); VRC Sires Produce Stakes (1980, 1983); Rawson Stakes (1980); Doomben 10,000 (1980); Marlboro Cup (1981); George Ryder Stakes (1982); Futurity Stakes (1982, 1984); Caulfield Cup (1982, 1987); Australian Cup (1983, 1988); Caulfield Guineas (1983, 1987, 1988); Perth Cup (1983); Canterbury Guineas (1984); Goodwood Handicap (1988) International race wins: Grosser Preis von Baden (1984); Cork And Orrery Stakes (1984); Nunthorpe Stakes (1984); Ascot Gold Cup (1985); Haydock Sprint Cup (1985); Hong Kong Gold Cup (1985); Hong Kong Classic Mile (1985); Queen Elizabeth II Stakes (1986); St James's Palace Stakes (1986); Queen Elizabeth II Cup (1989, 1991); Queen's Silver Jubilee Cup (1989); Centenary Sprint Cup (1991); Macau Star Of Sand Stakes (1997); Macau Derby (1997)

Honours
- Australian Racing Hall of Fame

Significant horses
- Dulcify; Lord Reims; Family of Man; Strawberry Road

Brent Thomson (born 1958 in Wanganui) is a New Zealand jockey, who is best known for winning the Cox Plate on four occasions, and his association with the champion horse Dulcify.

The son of a leading trainer Kevin Thomson, Brent became the champion apprentice of New Zealand at the age of 16.

He moved to Australia as a teenager to further his career, earning the nickname ‘The Babe’ from the local racing press.

Settling in Melbourne, he became the stable rider for Colin Hayes, winning three jockey's premierships during his six-year association with the trainer, which included wins in the Cox Plate on So Called, and the AJC Derby, Victoria Derby, Rosehill Guineas, and Cox Plate on Dulcify. He also won many major races riding for other trainers, including two more Cox Plates (on Fury's Order Family of Man), and the Caulfield Cup on Gurner's Lane.

A successful stint riding overseas (chiefly in the United Kingdom) followed where he rode more than 100 winners. He also rode the Australian horse Strawberry Road to victory in the 1984 Grosser Preis von Baden

Upon returning to Australia, further big race success followed winning a second Caulfield Cup and an Adelaide Cup on Lord Reims as well as a famous victory in the Australian Cup on Dandy Andy who defeated the champions Vo Rogue and Bonecrusher at long odds.

Thomson retired from riding in 2000 but continued to work in the bloodstock industry.

In 2012 he was inducted into the New Zealand Racing Hall of Fame and in 2019 into the Australian Racing Hall of Fame.

== See also ==
- Thoroughbred racing in Australia
- Thoroughbred racing in New Zealand
