= Zamazaan =

Zamazaan may refer to:

- Zamazaan (horse), racehorse and sire
- Zamazaan (racing sailboat)
