= Richard Julian =

American folk musician

- Born: June 13, 1967 (age 59); Austin, Texas
- Occupation: Musician
- Musical career
- Genres: Folk music; Jazz
- Labels: Blue Note Records, Manhattan Records, Compass Records, My Good Man
- Website: richardjulian.net

Richard Julian (born June 13, 1967) is an American composer, lyricist, and singer based in Brooklyn, New York. His music has been praised by musicians from Randy Newman. to Bonnie Raitt. He is also known for his collaborations with Norah Jones and as the co-founder and curator of the popular Brooklyn music venue Bar LunÁtico

== Early life and education ==
Julian was raised in Arden, Delaware and attended Mount Pleasant High School. Upon graduation, Julian lived briefly in Las Vegas, playing keyboards in a casino band before relocating to New York City to pursue a music career with his original songs.

== Career ==
After moving to New York City, Julian’s music remained a well-kept secret for over a decade before seeing the critical success of his independent 2002 release, Good Life. Julian’s music gained further prominence that year as the opener for Norah Jones' Come Away With Me tour — and subsequently, Julian and Jones teamed up to front The Little Willies, an urban country group which featured telecaster wizard Jim Campilongo. The group recorded two albums for Blue Note Records. During this fruitful period, Julian released two notable albums of his own on Manhattan Records — Slow New York (2006) and Sunday Morning In Saturday’s Shoes (2009) — which garnered critical acclaim and brought headline appearances in the United States, Japan, and Europe. A brief move thereafter to New Orleans inspired Julian to hone his piano skills, integrating them alongside his trademark finger-style guitar. The result was Fleur De Lis, recorded at Algiers Point and featuring legendary New Orleans musicians Jon Cleary, Johnny Vidacovich, and Terence Higgins. Upon returning to New York City, Julian had a son and co-founded Bar LunÁtico, the popular Brooklyn venue he co-owns and curates. Julian’s latest album, Hit & Run, marks his first outing in ten years and features him mostly on electric keyboard and piano. Its ten original songs retain Julian’s evocative narratives while framing them with punchy vocal and brass arrangements. He is joined by a noteworthy array of musicians on the New York scene — a scene in which he plays an integral role through his curation at Bar LunÀtico. Hit & Run is set for release on streaming platforms and vinyl in 2025.

== Discography ==
=== As leader ===
- Richard Julian (Blackbird, Sire, 1997)
- Smash Palace (Blackbird, Sire, 1999)
- Good Life (My Good Man, 2002)
- Slow New York (Manhattan Records, 2006)
- Sunday Morning In Saturday’s Shoes (Manhattan Records, 2008)
- Girls Need Attention (Compass Records, 2010)
- Fleur De Lis (My Good Man, 2012)
- Hit And Run (To Be Released, 2025)

=== with The Little Willies ===
- The Little Willies (Blue Note Records, 2006)
- For The Good Times (Blue Note Records, 2011)

=== with John Chin Quartet ===
- Anything Mose (Independent Release, 2021)
