= Haras de Meautry =

Human settlement in France

Coordinates: 49°20′31″N 0°6′16″E

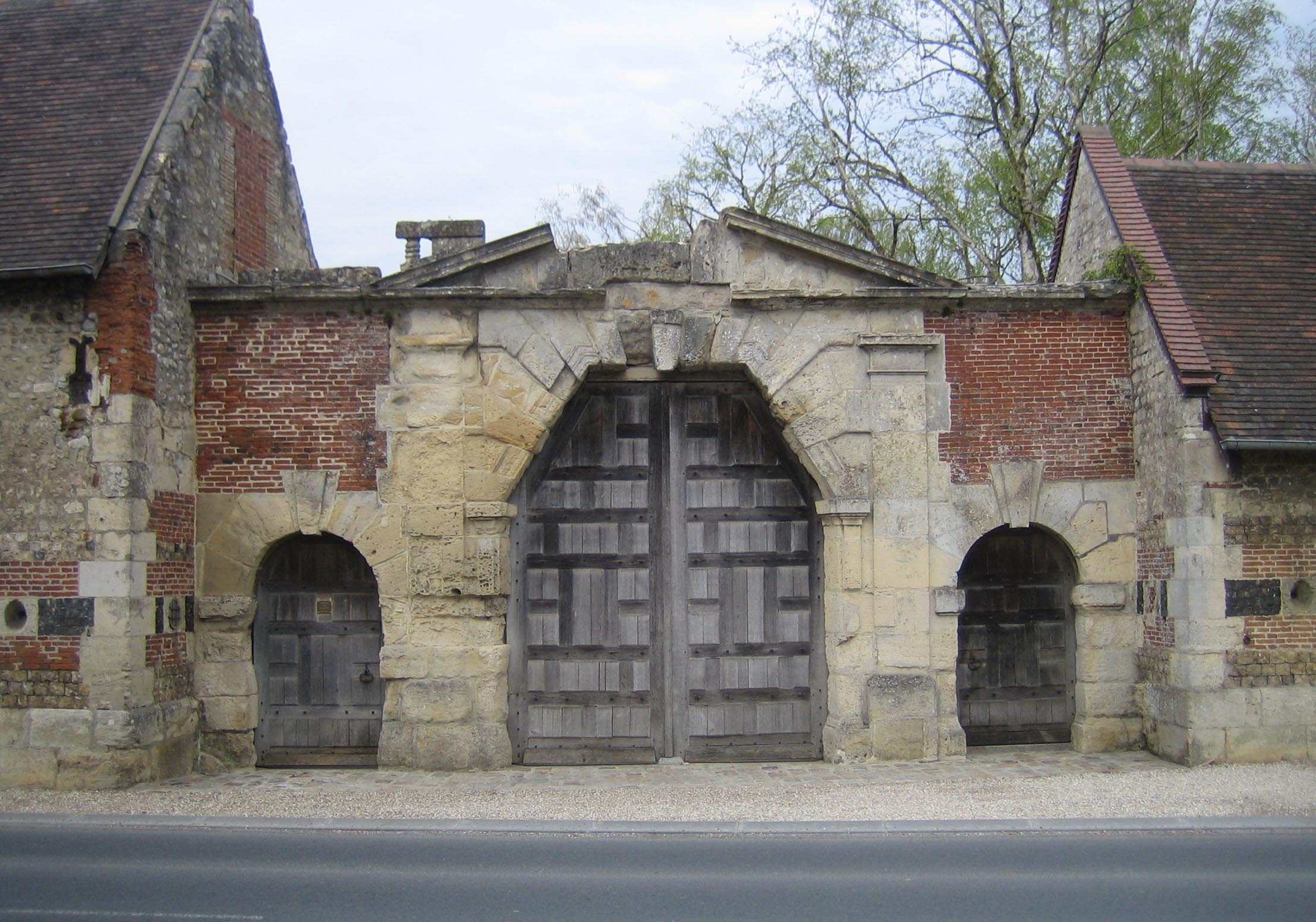
Gate.

Haras de Meautry in Touques, Calvados, Normandy, France, is a thoroughbred horse breeding farm. It was acquired in the 19th century by horse-racing enthusiast Alphonse James de Rothschild (1827–1905) who passed it down to his offspring so that today it is in the hands of Édouard de Rothschild (b. 1957).

Numerous stud farms can be found in the area and four kilometers away in Deauville are two race tracks, the Deauville-Clairefontaine Racecourse and the Deauville-La Touques Racecourse.

Over the years, Haras de Meautry has produced a number of champion horses including:

- Brantôme (f. 1931)
- Bubbles (f. 1925)
- Eclair au Chocolat (f. 1935 – taken by the Nazis during World War II)
- Exbury (f. 1959)
- Heaume (f. 1887)
- La Farina (f. 1911)
- Stracchino (f. 1874)
- Le Roi Soleil (f. 1895)
- Sans Souci II (f. 1904)
- Vieux Manoir (f. 1947)
- Indian Danehill (f. 1996)

One of the most famous of the Rothschild horses was Brantôme, owned by Edouard Alphonse de Rothschild, the then owner of Haras de Meautry. Brantôme was unbeaten at ages 2 and 3 and is ranked among the best French horses ever. The colt won the French 2000 Guineas; the Prix Lupin, the Prix Royal-Oak, the most prestigious 1934 Prix de l'Arc de Triomphe plus eight other significant races.

During the German occupation of France during World War II, all breeders' premiums won by Meautry-bred horses were confiscated by the Nazi officials in charge of French racing. As well, the Nazis seized some of the best racehorses in the country and shipped more than six hundred thoroughbreds out of the country. Some went to Hungary, but most were shipped to Germany for racing or for breeding at the Heeresgestüt Altefeld, which belonged to the German Wehrmacht. Among them was the champion Brantôme who would be recovered in 1945 at the end of the War.

Other Rothschild-owned horses won the Grand Prix de Paris in 1909 and 1914 and claimed victory in a number of other important Stakes races including two more wins at the Prix de l'Arc de Triomphe in 1938 and 1963.

The stables' filly, England's Legend, was one of the favorites for the 2001 Breeders' Cup Filly & Mare Turf but faded badly to finish 11th.

== Classic Race wins ==
- Prix de l'Arc de Triomphe : 1934, 1938, 1963
- Prix du Jockey Club : 1876, 1890, 1977
- Prix de Diane : 1878, 1889, 1894, 1919, 1920, 1932, 1933, 1935, 1957, 1960, 1961
- Grand Prix de Paris : 1898, 1907, 1935, 1950, 1964, 1979, 1982
