= Lord Reims Stakes =

- Class: Group III
- Location: Morphettville Racecourse, South Australia
- Inaugurated: 1889
- Race type: Thoroughbred - Flat racing
- Sponsor: Sportsbet (2026)

Race information
- Distance: 2600 metres (~1 5/8 miles)
- Surface: Turf
- Track: Left-handed
- Qualification: Three years old and older
- Weight: Set Weights with penalties
- Purse: A$150,000 (2026)
- Bonuses: first three placegetters exempt from ballot for Adelaide Cup

The Lord Reims Stakes is a South Australian Jockey Club Group 3 Thoroughbred horse race for horses aged three years old and older, over a distance of 2600 metres at Morphettville Racecourse in Adelaide, Australia in March.

== History ==
The race was renamed in 2010 to Lord Reims Stakes after Lord Reims, who won this race in 1988 and 1989 and also winning the Adelaide Cup three consecutive times between 1987–1989. The event is a traditional lead-up race to the Adelaide Cup.

=== Distance ===
- 1889–1971 - 1 1/2 miles (~2400 metres)
- 1973–1979 – 2400 metres
- 1980–1981 – 2600 metres
- 1982–1985 – 2450 metres
- 1986–1997 – 2400 metres
- 1998–2003 – 2500 metres
- 2004 onwards - 2600 metres

=== Grade ===
- 1889–1979 - Principal Race
- 1980 onwards - Group 3

=== Name ===
- 1889–1963 - Fisher Handicap
- 1964–1979 - West End Draught Stakes
- 1980–1984 - West End Stakes
- 1985–1991 - West End Export Stakes
- 1992 - West End Super Stakes
- 1993–1994 - Eagle Blue Stakes
- 1995–2000 - West End Draught Stakes
- 2001–2008 - Carlton Draught Stakes
- 2009 - Tooheys New Stakes
- 2010 onwards - Lord Reims Stakes

=== Doubles win ===
The following thoroughbreds have won the Cups Double: Lord Reims Stakes (West End Draught Stakes) – Adelaide Cup in the same year.

- Vakeel (1893), Port Admiral (1894), Warpaint (1896), Stralia (1925), Altimeter (1928), Parallana (1929), Far Away Places (1961), Fulmen (1967), Phar Ace (1974), Yashmak (1980), Moss Kingdom (1984), Lord Reims (1988, 1989), Water Boatman (1990), Ideal Centreman (1991), French Resort (1996), Cronus (1997) and Apache King (2001)

== Winners ==
The following are past winners of the race.

- 2026 - Eventually
- 2025 - Gotta Go Guru
- 2024 - Yellowbrick Road
- 2023 - Highland Jakk
- 2022 - Canford
- 2021 - Tralee Rose
- 2020 - Eperdument
- 2019 - Bondeiger
- 2018 - Etah James
- 2017 - Master Of Arts
- 2016 - Signoff
- 2015 - Taiyoo
- 2014 - Distillation
- 2013 - My Ex Mate
- 2012 - Enchanting Wate
- 2011 - Guyno
- 2010 - Moment In Time
- 2009 - Miss Pavlova
- 2008 - Exalted Ego
- 2007 - Danebar
- 2006 - Royal Player
- 2005 - Far Lane
- 2004 - Bel Air
- 2003 - Le Destina
- 2002 - Firetaine
- 2001 - Apache King
- 2000 - Frenzel Rhomb
- 1999 - Star Binder
- 1998 - Heed The Toll
- 1997 - Cronus
- 1996 - French Resort
- 1995 - Balmeressa
- 1994 - Top Rating
- 1993 - Toy Image
- 1992 - Runaway Groom
- 1991 - Ideal Centreman
- 1990 - Water Boatman
- 1989 - Lord Reims
- 1988 - Lord Reims
- 1987 - Bourbon Boy
- 1986 - Foxseal
- 1985 - Beguiled
- 1984 - Moss Kingdom
- 1983 - Our Shout
- 1982 - Dealer's Choice
- 1981 - Pearl Lover
- 1980 - Yashmak
- 1979 - North Fleet
- 1978 - Muros
- 1977 - Wave King
- 1976 - Inceptor
- 1975 - Herminia
- 1974 - Phar Ace
- 1973 - Dark Suit
- 1972 - race not held
- 1971 - Counterfeit
- 1970 - Tavel
- 1969 - Wool Beau
- 1968 - Fulmen
- 1967 - Fulmen
- 1966 - Polly Perfect
- 1965 - Welltown
- 1964 - Baroda Gleam
- 1963 - Sometime
- 1962 - Lucky Fred
- 1961 - Far Away Places
- 1960 - Gaybao
- 1959 - Trellios
- 1958 - Newstone
- 1957 - Thaumus
- 1956 - Storm Glow
- 1955 - Falcon Gold
- 1954 - Falcon Gold
- 1953 - Rousvaross
- 1952 - Double Blank
- 1951 - Peter Pim
- 1950 - King Comedy
- 1949 - Typical
- 1948 - † Chatspa / Typical
- 1947 - Tuckout
- 1946 - Best Idea
- 1945 - King Opera
- 1944 - race not held
- 1943 - race not held
- 1942 - race not held
- 1941 - Prince Ariel
- 1940 - Saint Warden
- 1939 - Earl Sion
- 1938 - Koklani
- 1937 - Mutable
- 1936 - Celotex
- 1935 - Art
- 1934 - Bajardo
- 1933 - Glenvarloch
- 1932 - Kalford
- 1931 - Suzumi
- 1930 - Sceutum
- 1929 - Parallana
- 1928 - Altimeter
- 1927 - Cadelgo
- 1926 - Spearer
- 1925 - Stralia
- 1924 - Cadelgo
- 1923 - Castlton
- 1922 - Sandbee
- 1921 - Our Artillery
- 1920 - Daarewin
- 1919 - Bon Vue
- 1918 - Dependence
- 1917 - Scot's Jean
- 1916 - King's Chancellor
- 1915 - Admirable Bob
- 1914 - Bective
- 1913 - Ptah
- 1912 - Braw Scot
- 1911 - Fastness
- 1910 - Becky
- 1909 - Fiction
- 1908 - Willy Wally
- 1907 - Metal Queen
- 1906 - Spinaway
- 1905 - Masher
- 1904 - Barr
- 1903 - Florin
- 1902 - Lorne
- 1901 - Randwick
- 1900 - Martagon
- 1899 - Goodwill
- 1898 - Eleusinian
- 1897 - Loyalty
- 1896 - Warpaint
- 1895 - Auraria
- 1894 - Port Admiral
- 1893 - Vakeel
- 1892 - Lord Chesterfield
- 1891 - Emmie
- 1890 - Ivanhoe
- 1889 - Britannia

† Dead heat

== See also ==
- List of Australian Group races
- Group races
