= Etah James =

New Zealand-bred Thoroughbred racehorse

- Sire: Raise The Flag
- Grandsire: Sadler's Wells
- Dam: Etah
- Damsire: Danasinga
- Sex: Mare
- Foaled: 21 November 2012
- Country: New Zealand
- Colour: Brown
- Owner: M Lupton, Mrs C R Lupton, T C Reid & G R Howes
- Trainer: Ciaron Maher and David Eustace
- Record: 34: 8-2-1
- Earnings: A$1,252,774

Major wins
- Lord Reims Stakes (G3)(2018); Sydney Cup (G1)(2020)

Etah James (foaled 21 November 2012) is a Thoroughbred racehorse trained and bred in New Zealand and raced in New Zealand and Australia. She has won a Group One race, and over a million dollars.

== Racing career ==
Etah James had her first race at Cranbourne on 21 April 2017, finishing sixth. A month later, she had her first win at Mildura, collecting $11,000, before a four-month spell.

Between 26 September and 3 March 2018, Etah James progressed through the grades from a BM58 to a Group 3, winning five times in eight starts, the last six with Linda Meech as jockey. Paying $3.20 in the Lord Reims Stakes, "it was left to some Linda Meech magic to steer home" Etah James for her first victory in a Group race.

Meech, being dual-registered as a trainer, was not able to ride Etah James in its next campaign. Trainer Matt Cumani said, "The most important thing to me is to have continuity with riders and our horses, so it is disappointing that she can’t ride. Hopefully it can be looked at and we’ll do everything we can to help her try." Etah James contested five events between August and November, failing to place in any. In her last race, she led before finishing 25 lengths behind the winner.

In April 2019, she returned to New Zealand where she was trained by part-owner Mark Lupton. She had four races in New Zealand, placing once. She returned to Australia and Cumani to contest the Tattersall's Cup in June, leading early before collapsing late.

In her next campaign, Etah James failed to place in six of seven races. She did, however, win the $300,000 Pakenham Cup at a price of $61. Jockey Fred Kersley said, "I've never won a black type race so to get that it means a lot to me. Speaking to the boss (Cumani) earlier today, he gave me a fair bit of confidence. The horse was rock-hard fit for today and had been working up nicely."

In February 2020, Etah James returned again to New Zealand, finishing third and fourth in the Avondale Cup and Auckland Cup respectively. In March, Etah James returned to Australia, this time to trainers Ciaron Maher and David Eustace. Cumani said, "I knew they wanted to run in the Sydney Cup — it was either send her over to me for a week and then I had to get her to Sydney during the COVID crisis, which wouldn’t have been easy, or give her to Ciaron and David who had stables in Sydney." Etah James won the race, her first Group 1, by a head. Jockey Glen Boss said, "I’ve been riding her work and I trialled her here in a very fast trial and I said, 'this is flying, this thing'. I was expecting to run one, two or three. That last 400m felt like an eternity, because we were going so slow."

During the Spring Carnival, Etah James contested three group races, failing to place in any, including finishing 17th in the Melbourne Cup. Her last race was in the Sandown Cup on 14 November 2020.

Mark Lupton announced Etah James' retirement in April 2021. He said, "She was going to have another crack at the Sydney Cup and she was in work on a water walker in Melbourne but a sarcoid started growing and she had to go back to Sydney for an operation. We decided she had been through enough and we have retired her. She looks a picture of health and the sarcoids have almost disappeared. She will go to stud in Australia this year before coming back to New Zealand.”

== Broodmare Career ==
Etah James has foaled:

- Makarov (2022, by Russian Camelot)
- a colt (2023, by Saxon Warrior).

== Siblings ==
Etah James' dam Etah produced multiple winners:

- Amuse (2010, by Savabeel)
- Sniper (2011, by Alamosa)
- Redeemer (2014, by He's Remarkable)
- Jesse James (2016, by Reliable Man)
- Usain (2020, by US Navy Flag).

Gambino (by Raise the Flag), a full brother to Etah James, trialed but has not had a raceday start.

== See also ==
- Thoroughbred racing in New Zealand
- Thoroughbred racing in Australia
