= Brantôme (horse) =

French-bred Thoroughbred racehorse

- Sire: Blandford
- Grandsire: Swynford
- Dam: Vitamine
- Damsire: Clarissimus
- Sex: Stallion
- Foaled: 1931
- Country: France
- Colour: Bay
- Breeder: Haras de Meautry
- Owner: Baron Édouard Alphonse de Rothschild
- Trainer: Lucien Robert
- Record: 14: 12-0-0
- Earnings: $1,979,631

Major wins
- Prix Robert Papin (1933); Grand Critérium (1933); Prix Morny (1933); French 2000 Guineas (1934); Prix Lupin (1934); Prix Royal-Oak (1934); Prix de l'Arc de Triomphe (1934); Prix du Prince d'Orange (1935); Prix du Cadran (1935)
- Last updated on 23 September 2006

Brantôme (1931–1952) was a French Thoroughbred racehorse and prominent sire. He was unbeaten at ages 2 and 3 and is ranked among the best French horses ever.

== Background ==
Brantome was sired by Irish stallion Blandford (1919–1935) out of the mare Vitamine. He was owned by the Haras de Meautry stable of Édouard Alphonse de Rothschild. He was named for the city of Brantôme, Dordogne.

== Racing career ==
As a two-year-old, Brantôme won the Prix Robert Papin, Grand Critérium and the Prix Morny. His major victories at age three include the French 2000 Guineas, the Prix Lupin, the Prix Royal-Oak, the country's most prestigious horse race, the Prix de l'Arc de Triomphe plus other significant races.

In 1935, at age four, Brantôme suffered his first loss. Entered in the Ascot Gold Cup in England, eleven days before the race Brantôme got loose from the stables and was not caught until after he had galloped into downtown Chantilly. The horse lost three shoes and sustained a bad cut. Despite this, his owner still sent him to compete in the Ascot Gold Cup where he finished out of the money.

== Stud record ==
After winning twelve of the fourteen races he competed in, Brantôme was retired to stand at stud. During the German occupation of France in World War II the Nazis seized some of the best racehorses in France. They shipped more than six hundred thoroughbreds out of the country. Some went to Hungary, but most were shipped to Germany for racing or for breeding at the German National Stud. Among them was Brantôme, who was recovered in 1945 at the end of the war.

Brantôme was the sire of Vieux Manoir who was the grandsire of All Along and Ivanjica as well as Val de Loire who was a Leading sire in France three times and the damsire of Shergar. Brantôme was also the great-grandsire of Exbury.

Brantôme died on 3 July 1952 at the age of twenty-one.

== Sire line tree ==
- Brantome
  - Abbe Pierre
  - Ludovic Le More
    - El Krim
  - Breughel
  - Caldarium
    - Frascati
    - Romantisme
    - Hidalgo
    - Antony
    - Launay
    - Caldova
    - Calta
    - Trac
  - Triboulet
  - Pensbury
  - Vieux Manoir
    - Le Haar
      - Exbury
        - Zamazaan
        - Ex Libris
        - Five Arrows
        - Calshot Light
        - Dungaree
        - Madison Palace
        - Exceptionnel
        - Poil de Chameau
        - Crow
        - Smuggler
        - Xibury
        - Soleil Noir
        - Ataxerxus
        - Chicbury
        - Julius Caesar
        - What A Joy
      - Duc de Gueldre
      - Veronese
        - Alcamo
        - Fidyi
        - Latmos
        - Fernet
        - Conte Pescaor
        - Jerez
      - Niksar
        - Sabreur
        - Detonator
      - Trictrac
        - El Mondo
        - Balmerino
      - Agar
      - Frontal
        - Benedikt
        - Issus
        - Belespirit
        - Ocos
        - Ordos
      - Ramsin
      - Corps A Corps
    - Mon Manoir
      - Creation
    - Mourne
      - Snob
        - Batitu
        - Goodly
      - Frontin
      - Garde Coeur
      - Greyhound
      - Demi Deuil
      - Thataboy
      - Rock Roi
      - Galant Prince
      - My Mourne
        - Batallador
      - Azorello
      - Rouser
    - Cherasco
    - Coup de Canon
    - San Roman
      - Tequendama
    - Grand Shelem
    - Adoneo
    - Vik
      - Zorba
    - Tang
      - Arnaldo
    - Val de Loir
      - Val d'Aoste
      - Beaugency
        - Higency
      - Chaparral
        - High Sierra
      - Nonancourt
      - Faldor
      - Ifniri
      - Tourangeau
      - Valdrague
      - Tourjours Pret
      - Stanleyville
      - Tennyson
        - Le Mamamouchi
        - Marasali
        - Full of Stars
      - Beauvallon
        - Dniepr
      - Thoreau
      - Olmeto
        - Jean d'Mour
      - Val de l'Orne
        - Ruscelli
        - Victory Zone
        - Valuable Witness
        - Truculent
        - Val Dansant
        - Golden Choice
        - Pay the Butler
        - Baron de Vaux
        - River God
      - Avaray
        - Lucozade
    - Gai Logis
    - Michelozzo
  - Couquelin
  - Dragon Blanc
    - Always
    - Good Will
