= Walter Nightingall =

British racehorse trainer (1895–1968)

Personal information
- Born: 1895 Epsom, Surrey, United Kingdom
- Died: 1968 (aged 72–73)
- Occupation: Trainer

Horse racing career
- Sport: Horse racing

Major racing wins
- British Classic Race wins: 2000 Guineas (1); Epsom Derby (1)

Racing awards
- British flat racing Champion Trainer (1943)

Significant horses
- Straight Deal, Niksar

Walter Nightingall (1895–1968) was a British Thoroughbred racehorse trainer. The son and grandson of successful trainers, Nightingall was one of the major racing figures at Epsom for forty years in a career which began in 1927. He trained the winners of two classics and was Champion Trainer in 1943.

== Background ==
Walter Nightingall was born in 1895 at Epsom, where his father, William Nightingall and his grandfather John Nightingall were successful trainers at the South Hatch Stables. Nightingall received little formal education, being apprenticed as a jockey for his father's stable. His riding career ended when he was fourteen years old after he fractured his skull in a fall at Windsor Racecourse. During the First World War Nightingall served in the Royal Army Veterinary Corps before becoming assistant trainer to his father in 1919.

== Training career ==
When William Nightingall died in December 1926, Walter took over the South Hatch Stable and was an immediate success, sending out 55 winners in 1927. In 1929 he won his first major race when he won the Great Metropolitan Handicap at Epsom with Jugo, a horse he had bought from a selling race, and in the following year he won the Irish Derby with Rock Star. In 1937 Nightingall began to train horses for the extremely wealthy and eccentric Dorothy Paget. Nightingall's best season was 1943, when he trained Paget's colt Straight Deal to win the New Derby at Newmarket Racecourse and won the title of Champion Trainer with 29 wins and £13,833 in prize money.

After the Second World War, Paget withdrew her horses from South Hatch, but Nightingall found another notable patron in Winston Churchill. Among the major winners he trained for Churchill were Colonist (Jockey Club Cup), Welsh Abbott (Portland Handicap) and Tudor Monarch (Stewards' Cup). Other major race winners for Winston Churchill included High Hat (Geoffrey Freer Stakes twice, and the Aly Khan International). and Vienna (Prix d'Harcourt) (7) Despite his associations with Paget and Churchill, Nightingall's stable did not attract major owner-breeders, and became known as the "Saturday Trainer" as most of his patrons were businessmen who could only attend the races at the weekend. He had an outstanding season in 1965, taking his second classic when the French-bred colt Niksar won the 2000 Guineas. In the build-up to the Epsom Derby there was a rumour that Niksar was the target of a gang which intended to prevent him from running, leading Nightingall to employ security guards and install an "electronic device" to detect intruders. On the night before the Derby an attempt was made to enter the colt's stable, but the intruders were repelled by the guards, with a shotgun being fired during the fracas. Niksar finished fourth in the Derby behind Sea Bird, one place behind another Nightingall-trained colt I Say. In the following year I Say gave Nightingall his biggest win at his home course when taking the Coronation Cup. Nightingall trained Rock Star to win the 1930 Irish Derby.(7)

== Family and character ==
Nightingall was a shy, modest man of medium height with blue eyes and sharp features and was always impeccably dressed in public. He was assisted throughout his training career by his sister Marjorie. He married twice and had one son and one daughter from his first marriage. He died in 1968. Walter's second wife was Bessie Duller, formerly wife of jockey George Duller, and niece of music hall artiste Marie Lloyd.

In their book A Century of Champions, John Randall and Tony Morris rated Nightingall the thirty-second best British or Irish trainer of the 20th century.
