= Crow (horse) =

French-bred Thoroughbred racehorse

- Sire: Exbury
- Grandsire: Le Haar
- Dam: Carmosina
- Damsire: Right of Way
- Sex: Stallion
- Foaled: 1973
- Country: France
- Colour: Chestnut
- Breeder: Daniel Wildenstein
- Owner: Daniel Wildenstein
- Trainer: Angel Penna; Peter Walwyn
- Record: 17: 5-4-1

Major wins
- Prix Eugène Adam (1976); St Leger Stakes (1976); Ormonde Stakes (1978); Coronation Cup (1978)

Awards
- Timeform rating 134

Crow (23 February 1973 – 10 February 1989) was a French Thoroughbred racehorse and sire. He was one of the best three-year-olds in Europe in 1976 when he won the classic St Leger Stakes and finished second in the Prix de l'Arc de Triomphe. He went on to win the Coronation Cup as a five-year-old in 1978. After he retired from racing, he stood as a breeding stallion in the United States and Australia with limited success.

== Background ==
Crow was a chestnut horse with a white blaze standing 16 hands high bred by his owner Daniel Wildenstein. He was the best horse sired by the Prix de l'Arc de Triomphe winner Exbury, to whom he bore a close physical resemblance. His dam, Carmosina was an Argentinian mare bought by Wildenstein for $10,000. The colt was sent into training in France with Angel Penna. Crow usually raced in a sheepskin noseband.

== Racing career ==
=== 1976: three-year-old season ===
Crow did not race as a two-year-old but began his racing career in the spring of 1976. He won the Prix Northeast, finished second to Hunza Dancer in the Grand Prix de Compiègne and then won the Prix Eugène Adam over 2000 metres at Saint-Cloud Racecourse.

In August, Crow was sent to England, where he finished second to Wollow in the Benson and Hedges Gold Cup. In September he returned to Britain for the 200th running of the St Leger Stakes at Doncaster Racecourse. Ridden by Yves Saint-Martin he started the 6/1 co-favourite alongside Oats and General Ironside. Crow took the lead early in the straight and won the classic by two lengths from Secret Man and Scallywag. In October, Crow was one of twenty horses to contest the Prix de l'Arc de Triomphe over 2,400 metres at Longchamp Racecourse. Crow took a clear lead in the straight but was overtaken 100 metres from the finish and finished second to Ivanjica. The beaten horses included Pawneese, Bruni and Youth. On his final appearance of the season he failed to reproduce his best form as he finished unplaced behind Vitiges in the Champion Stakes over ten furlongs at Newmarket Racecourse.

=== 1977–1978: later career ===
Crow did not record any major successes in 1977. He did, however, finish a close fifth behind Alleged in the Prix de l'Arc de Triomphe and ran third to Johnny D. in the Turf Classic. At five Crow was trained in England by Peter Walwyn. He finished second to Rex Magna in the Prix d'Hédouville and won the Ormonde Stakes at Chester. In June he appeared at Epsom Downs Racecourse for the Coronation Cup. He started at odds of 9/4 and won from the New Zealand-bred champion Balmerino.

== Assessment ==
Crow was awarded a rating of 134 by Timeform in 1976, making him the second-bestthree-year-old colt in Europe, one pound behind Youth. A rating of 130 is considered the mark of an above average Group One winner. In their book A Century of Champions, John Randall and Tony Morris rated Crow an "average" St Leger winner.

== Stud career ==
Crow was retired to stud in 1979. He stood as a breeding stallion in Kentucky before being exported to Australia in 1986. He sired many winners, but few were of any consequence. Crow died in Australia on 10 February 1989.

== Pedigree ==
Pedigree of Crow (FR), chestnut horse, 1973
Sire Exbury (FR) 1959	Le Haar; 1954	Vieux Manoir	Brantôme
Sire Exbury (FR) 1959	Le Haar; 1954	Vieux Manoir	Vieille Maison
Sire Exbury (FR) 1959	Le Haar; 1954	Mince Pie	Tleferique
Sire Exbury (FR) 1959	Le Haar; 1954	Mince Pie	Cannelle
Sire Exbury (FR) 1959	Greensward; 1953	Mossborough	Nearco
Sire Exbury (FR) 1959	Greensward; 1953	Mossborough	All Moonshine
Sire Exbury (FR) 1959	Greensward; 1953	Stargrass	Noble Star
Sire Exbury (FR) 1959	Greensward; 1953	Stargrass	Grass Widow
Dam Carmosina (ARG) 1963	Right of Way; 1957	Honeyway	Fairway
Dam Carmosina (ARG) 1963	Right of Way; 1957	Honeyway	Honey Buzzard
Dam Carmosina (ARG) 1963	Right of Way; 1957	Magnificent	Migoli
Dam Carmosina (ARG) 1963	Right of Way; 1957	Magnificent	Isle of Capri
Dam Carmosina (ARG) 1963	Sixtina; 1956	Aristophanes	Hyperion
Dam Carmosina (ARG) 1963	Sixtina; 1956	Aristophanes	Commotion
Dam Carmosina (ARG) 1963	Sixtina; 1956	La Dogana	Advocate
Dam Carmosina (ARG) 1963	Sixtina; 1956	La Dogana	Veneta (Family 3-b)
