= Exbury (horse) =

French-bred Thoroughbred racehorse

- Sire: Le Haar
- Grandsire: Vieux Manoir
- Dam: Greensward
- Damsire: Mossborough
- Sex: Stallion
- Foaled: 1959
- Country: France
- Colour: Chestnut
- Breeder: Haras de Meautry
- Owner: Guy de Rothschild
- Trainer: Geoffroy Watson
- Record: 16: 8-3-3
- Earnings: 1,972,179 NF in France; £13,456 in England

Major wins
- Prix Henri Foy (1962); Prix Daru (1962); Prix Boiard (1963); Prix Ganay (1963); Coronation Cup (1963); Grand Prix de Saint-Cloud (1963); Prix de l'Arc de Triomphe (1963)

Awards
- Champion Older Horse in France (1963)

Honours
- Timeform rating: 138; Prix Exbury at Hippodrome de Saint-Cloud
- Last updated on 22 October 2009

Exbury (1959–1979) was a French Thoroughbred racehorse named for the famous Exbury Gardens Estate in Hampshire, England belonging to owner Guy de Rothschild's cousin, Edmund de Rothschild.

== Background ==
Bred at the Rothschild's Haras de Meautry in Touques, Calvados, through his sire's line Exbury is a descendant of Haras de Meautry's great champion Brantôme and on his mare's side, the extremely important Italian sire, Nearco. Trained at Chantilly by the Englishman, Geoffroy Watson, a son of trainer John Watson who for forty years was the private trainer for the successful racing stable of Leopold de Rothschild.

== Racing career ==
At age two, Exbury started four times, winning once and finishing second three times. As a three-year-old, in a year where Val de Loir and Match II were prominent, Exbury began to show some of his ability, winning two conditions races and finishing second to Match II in the important Grand Prix de Saint-Cloud.

At age four Exbury came into his own, winning all five of his 1963 starts, beating many of the best in France and in England. The National Horseracing Museum called Exbury "the best middle distance horse in Europe in 1963." That year, Exbury won the Prix Boïard, then beat Val de Loir by four lengths in winning the Prix Ganay. In England he won the Coronation Cup by six lengths then back in France beat Val de Loir again in the Grand Prix de Saint-Cloud and capped off the year with a victory in France's most prestigious horse race, the Prix de l'Arc de Triomphe. Including Exbury, horses owned by Guy de Rothschild won the Prix Boiard at Hippodrome de Saint-Cloud six times. In 1969, France Galop renamed the race in Exbury's honor.

== Stud record ==
Exbury was retired to Haras de Meautry stud in Calvados, France at the end of the 1963 campaign.

He enjoyed reasonable success as a sire, producing several stakes/conditions race winners. Most prominent among them was Crow whose victories include the St. Leger Stakes, Coronation Cup (both G1) and the Prix Eugène Adam. His German-bred son Ataxerxes won the Preis von Europa (G1). Another Exbury son, Madison Palace, won conditions/stakes races in France and California and the Exbury filly Example won conditions races in France and England.

His son, Zamazaan, was exported to New Zealand where he sired 58 stakeswinners for 123 stakeswins.

Another son, Calshot Light (GB) was exported to Australia where sired 23 live foals, but no stakeswinners.

== Sire line tree ==
- Exbury
  - Zamazaan
    - Good Lord
    - Happy Union
    - Bright Halo
    - Exemplify
    - Affinity
    - Phizam
      - Double Take
      - Zamination
      - Mr Prudent
    - Veloso
    - Laud Eulogy
      - Laud Peregrine
    - Samasaan
    - Lord Reims
    - Sir Zephyr
    - Il Comandante
    - Beau Zam
    - Mr Bunnythorpe
    - Zamoff
  - Ex Libris
  - Five Arrows
  - Calshot Light
  - Dungaree
    - Reca
  - Madison Palace
  - Exceptionnel
    - Kotare Chief
  - Poil de Chameau
  - Crow
  - Smuggler
  - Xibury
  - Soleil Noir
  - Ataxerxus
  - Chicbury
  - Julius Caesar
    - Runway Romance
  - What A Joy
