= Zamazaan (racing sailboat) =

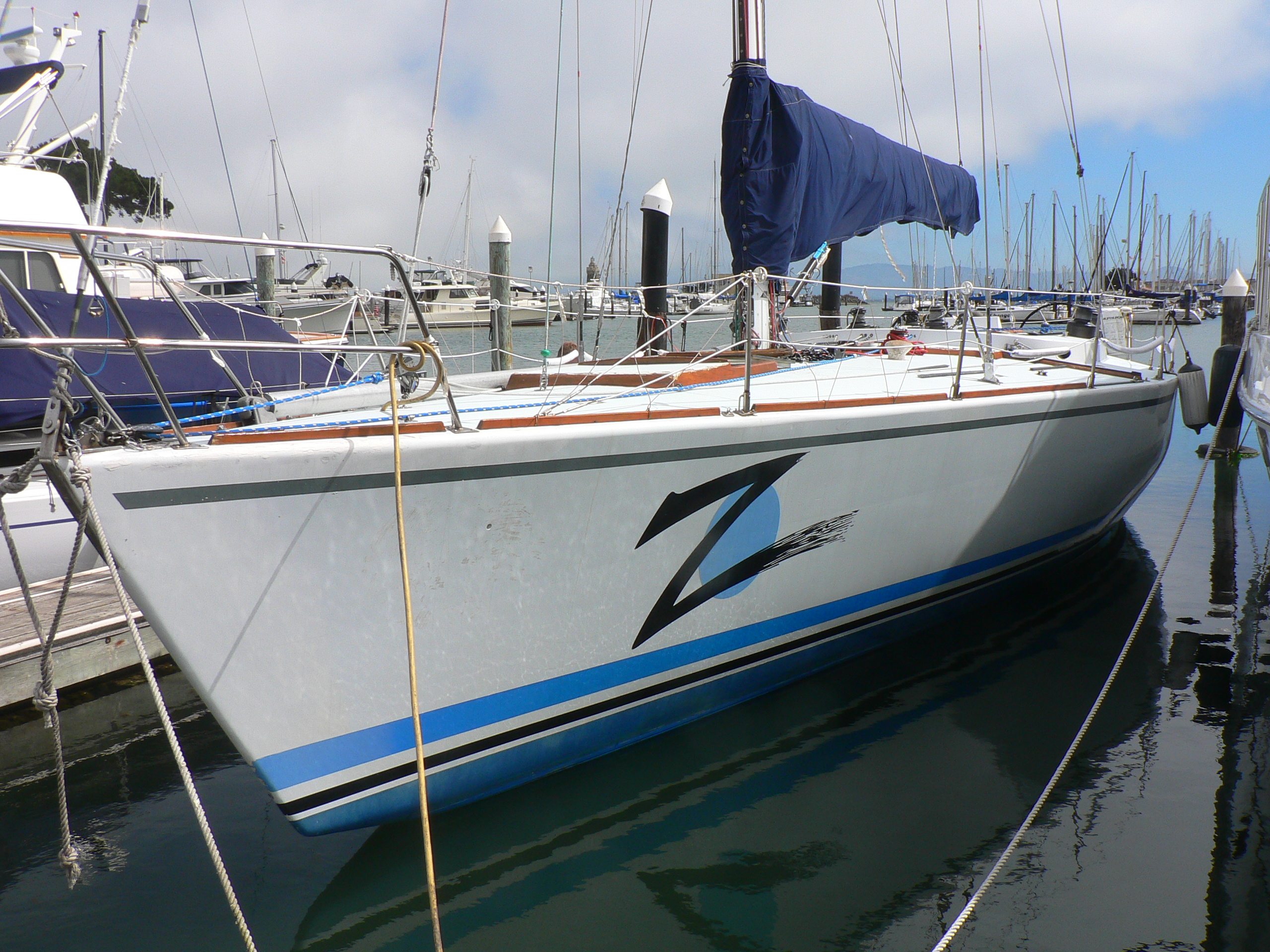
Zamazaan

This article is about the Farr 52 racing sailboat Zamazaan.
For the racehorse of the same name, see Zamazaan (horse).

- 52 foot racing sloop of timber (wood) construction
- Designed in 1977 by noted yacht designer Bruce Farr

== Racing Record ==
- 1980: Winner of St Francis Yacht Club
  - Big Boat Series IOR I
  - City of San Francisco Trophy
  - Skippered by owner Neville H Price
- 1982: Winner of Pacific Cup IOR division
