= Good Lord =

New Zealand-bred Thoroughbred racehorse

- Sire: Zamazaan
- Grandsire: Exbury
- Dam: Love In Bloom
- Damsire: Todman
- Sex: Gelding
- Foaled: 12 September 1971
- Country: New Zealand
- Colour: Bay
- Owner: Michael L. Hines
- Trainer: Charles E. Whittingham
- Jockey: Bill Shoemaker
- Earnings: $329,176

Major wins
- Queen Elizabeth Cup (1977); Wellington Cup (1977,1978); Sydney Cup (1978); Eddie Read Handicap (1979)

Good Lord was a New Zealand thoroughbred racehorse owned by Las Vegas lawyer Michael L. Hines (1920–1985).

== Background ==
Foaled on September 12, 1971, and purchased for just $6,250 as a yearling. Good Lord was sired by Zamazaan and his dam was Love in Bloom.

== Racing career ==
He was a good staying racehorse winning two Wellington Cups and the Queen Elizabeth Cup in 1977, where the Queen herself presented the Cup. The first Wellington Cup in 1977 was a thrilling encounter when he beat the great race mare Show Gate.

He raced under the name My Good Man in Australia and won the Sydney Cup in 1978.

In 1979, on U.S. soil, Good Lord won the Eddie Read Stakes under the champion American jockey Bill Shoemaker, while trained by the late Charles E. Whittingham.

== Pedigree ==
Pedigree of Good Lord, bay gelding, 1971
| Sire Zamazaan (FR) 1965 | Exbury (FR); 1959 | Le Haar | Vieux Manoir |
| Sire Zamazaan (FR) 1965 | Exbury (FR); 1959 | Le Haar | Mince Pie |
| Sire Zamazaan (FR) 1965 | Exbury (FR); 1959 | Greensward | Mossborough |
| Sire Zamazaan (FR) 1965 | Exbury (FR); 1959 | Greensward | Stargrass |
| Sire Zamazaan (FR) 1965 | Toyama (IRE); 1955 | Tulyar | Tehran |
| Sire Zamazaan (FR) 1965 | Toyama (IRE); 1955 | Tulyar | Neocracy |
| Sire Zamazaan (FR) 1965 | Toyama (IRE); 1955 | Rose Olynn | Pherozshah |
| Sire Zamazaan (FR) 1965 | Toyama (IRE); 1955 | Rose Olynn | Rocklyn |
| Dam Love in Bloom (AUS) 1964 | Todman (AUS); 1954 | Star Kingdom | Stardust |
| Dam Love in Bloom (AUS) 1964 | Todman (AUS); 1954 | Star Kingdom | Impromptu |
| Dam Love in Bloom (AUS) 1964 | Todman (AUS); 1954 | Oceana | Colombo |
| Dam Love in Bloom (AUS) 1964 | Todman (AUS); 1954 | Oceana | Orama |
| Dam Love in Bloom (AUS) 1964 | But Wonderful (AUS); 1957 | Helios | Hyperion |
| Dam Love in Bloom (AUS) 1964 | But Wonderful (AUS); 1957 | Helios | Foxy Gal |
| Dam Love in Bloom (AUS) 1964 | But Wonderful (AUS); 1957 | Lozari | Dhoti |
| Dam Love in Bloom (AUS) 1964 | But Wonderful (AUS); 1957 | Lozari | Filgaro |

== See also ==
- Thoroughbred racing in New Zealand
- Battle Heights
- La Mer
