= Linda Meech =

Australian jockey (born 1980)

Linda Meech (born 21 August 1980) is an Australian jockey. Born in New Zealand, she went to Australia on a working holiday in 1998 and stayed. She was the second Australian woman to win 1000 races, the first woman to reach 2000 winners, and the first woman to win the Victorian Jockeys' Premiership.

== Life and career ==
Meech grew up on the family farm in Pongaroa, in the Manawatū-Whanganui region of New Zealand's North Island. She began her jockey's apprenticeship in Queensland, then moved to New South Wales before settling in Victoria. She rode in her first race in 1999. In November 2013 she became the second Australian woman, after Clare Lindop in 2008, to win 1000 races. She won her first Group One race on Plucky Belle in the Coolmore Classic in March 2015.

In 2019, Meech was the first woman to win the Victorian Jockeys' Premiership, when she rode 145 winners from 755 rides. In 2025 she won the Neville Wilson Medal, for the jockey with the most wins in the Victorian country season, for the fifth time; she had previously won the award in 2009, 2010, 2018 and 2019. In August 2025 she became the first woman in Australasia to win 2000 races. As of late September 2026, she has ridden 2,111 winners, including two in Group One races.

Meech also has a trainer's licence. She and her partner Mark Pegus, who is also a trainer and jockey, had a son in January 2021. She resumed racing in May 2021. She lives on a property near Stawell.
