= Straight Deal =

British Thoroughbred racehorse

- Sire: Solario
- Grandsire: Gainsborough
- Dam: Good Deal
- Damsire: Appelle
- Sex: Stallion
- Foaled: 1940
- Country: United Kingdom
- Colour: Bay
- Breeder: Dorothy Paget
- Owner: Dorothy Paget
- Trainer: Walter Nightingall
- Record: 10: 5-2-1
- Earnings: £

Major wins
- New Derby (1943)

Straight Deal (1940–1968) was a British Thoroughbred racehorse and sire. In a career that lasted from 1942 to 1943 he ran ten times and won five races. His most important success came in June 1943 when he won the “New Derby”, a substitute race for The Derby run on the July Course at Newmarket. During the Second World War, many racecourses were closed either for safety reasons or for military use, with Epsom Downs Racecourse being used as the location for an anti-aircraft battery. Straight Deal was retired after finishing third in the “New St Leger” later that year and went on to become a successful stallion.

== Background ==
Straight Deal was bred at the Elsenham Stud in Hertfordshire by his owner, Dorothy Paget, Straight Deal’s sire, Solario was an outstanding racehorse who won the Coronation Cup and the Ascot Gold Cup in 1926, before going on to be Champion sire three times. Miss Paget's colt was one of only three known foals produced by Good Deal, a successful racehorse who won seven times.

Straight Deal, a “headstrong and sulky” bay horse, was trained by Walter Nightingall at his South Hatch Stables near Epsom.

== Racing career ==
=== 1942: two-year-old season ===
Straight Deal was a very useful two-year-old who competed at the highest level in 1942. He won a race at Salisbury and the Runnymede Plate at Windsor, both over six furlongs. At Newmarket, he ran in the Coventry Stakes (transferred from Ascot) and finished second, beaten one and a half lengths by Nasrullah.

In September he was sent to Newmarket and finished second to Umiddad in the Dewhurst Stakes. On his final start of the season, Straight Deal returned to Newmarket for the Middle Park Stakes in which he faced Nasrullah again. On this occasion, however, his temperament came to the fore as he charged the starting tape, unseated his rider and ran loose for several minutes. When the race eventually started he was quickly beaten and finished unplaced behind the filly Ribbon, with Nasrullah second.

In the Free Handicap, a ranking of the year’s best two-year-olds, Straight Deal was given a weight of 125 pounds, five pounds below Nasrullah and six behind the champion Lady Sybil.

=== 1943: three-year-old season ===
By the time Straight Deal reappeared in 1943 he had made excellent physical progress, with the Sporting Life's correspondent commenting that the colt had "strength written everywhere on his frame." Straight Deal began his three-year-old season on 26 April when he was one of five winners ridden by Tommy Carey at Windsor. In the 2000 Guineas on 25 May he was well fancied and started at odds of 17/2 in a field of nineteen but ran disappointingly to finish sixth behind Kingsway. It was felt that he had raced too prominently and would be better if held up for a late run.

In the New Derby on 19 June, Straight Deal started at odds of 100/7 in a field of twenty-three and was ridden again by Carey. The population of Newmarket reportedly doubled by the 15,000 spectators for the race, with many spending the night of the race in the open as all the hotels and boarding houses were full. Straight Deal was held up in the early stages as Persian Gulf made the running before he moved up to fifth place half a mile from the finish. Carey produced the colt with a strong run in the final furlong to catch Umiddad in the last strides and win by a head, with Nasrullah half a length away in third.

On his next start, Straight Deal was sent to Ascot where he won a race over one and a half miles. In September he returned to Newmarket for the “New St Leger”, a substitute for the Classic usually run at Doncaster. He started 3/1 favourite and proved to be the best colt in the race, but finished third behind the fillies Herringbone and Ribbon.

== Assessment ==
In their book A Century of Champions, John Randall and Tony Morris classified Straight Deal as an “average” Derby winner, and the one hundred and forty-eighth best British horse of the 20th Century, with a rating of 132.

== Stud career ==
Straight Deal was never a popular sire, possibly because of “unfashionable” elements on the female side of his pedigree. He nevertheless proved a reasonably good stallion, being especially successful with his fillies including Ark Royal, Kerkeb and Above Board, all of whom won the Yorkshire Oaks. The best of his colts were the stayers Aldborough (Doncaster Cup) and Royal Highway (Irish St Leger).

Straight Deal died in 1968 at the advanced age (for a thoroughbred) of twenty-eight.

== Sire line tree ==
- Straight Deal
  - Aldborough
  - Royal Highway
  - Honour Bound
    - Tied Cottage

== Pedigree ==
Pedigree of Straight Deal (GB), bay stallion, 1940
Sire Solario (GB) 1922	Gainsborough; 1915	Bayardo	Bay Ronald
Sire Solario (GB) 1922	Gainsborough; 1915	Bayardo	Galicia
Sire Solario (GB) 1922	Gainsborough; 1915	Rosedrop	St Frusquin*
Sire Solario (GB) 1922	Gainsborough; 1915	Rosedrop	Rosaline
Sire Solario (GB) 1922	Sun Worship; 1912	Sundridge	Amphion
Sire Solario (GB) 1922	Sun Worship; 1912	Sundridge	Sierra
Sire Solario (GB) 1922	Sun Worship; 1912	Doctrine	Ayrshire
Sire Solario (GB) 1922	Sun Worship; 1912	Doctrine	Axiom
Dam Good Deal (GB) 1932	Apelle; 1923	Sardanapale	Prestige
Dam Good Deal (GB) 1932	Apelle; 1923	Sardanapale	Gemma
Dam Good Deal (GB) 1932	Apelle; 1923	Angelina	St Frusquin*
Dam Good Deal (GB) 1932	Apelle; 1923	Angelina	Seraphine
Dam Good Deal (GB) 1932	Weeds; 1926	Arion	Valens
Dam Good Deal (GB) 1932	Weeds; 1926	Arion	Post Horn
Dam Good Deal (GB) 1932	Weeds; 1926	Dandelion	Rochester
Dam Good Deal (GB) 1932	Weeds; 1926	Dandelion	Security (Family: 1-t)

* Straight Deal is inbred 4S x 4D to the stallion St Frusquin, meaning that he appears fourth generation on the sire side of his pedigree, and fourth generation on the dam side of his pedigree.
