= Beau Zam =

Australian thoroughbred racehorse

- Sire: Zamazaan (France)
- Grandsire: Exbury (France)
- Dam: Belle Cherie (NZ)
- Damsire: Sovereign Edition (Ireland)
- Sex: Stallion
- Foaled: 6 November 1984
- Colour: Bay
- Breeder: C R Stuart
- Trainer: Bart Cummings
- Record: 28: 11:5:2
- Earnings: $2,388,675

Beau Zam (6 November 1984 – 17 April 2000) was a New Zealand-bred and Australian-trained Thoroughbred racehorse that won five Group 1 races.

== Racing career ==
Beau Zam was the first Australian horse to win over $2 million in stake money.

Races he won included the following:

- 1987 Hill Stakes (1750m) beating Cool Deal and Colour Page.
- 1987 AJC Spring Champion Stakes (2000m) beating Nickson and Hit Again Benny.
- 1988 Segenhoe Stakes (2000m) beating Bonhomie and Myocard.
- 1988 Tancred Stakes (2400m) beating Highland Chiefton and Vaguely Pleasant.
- 1988 AJC Derby (2400m) beating Brixton Town and Hunter.
- 1988 AJC St Leger (2800m) beating Palace Revolt and Sicilian Star.
- 1988 Queen Elizabeth II Stakes (2000m) beating Bonecrusher and Dandy Andy at Canberra in the presence of the Queen.
- 1989 Apollo Stakes (1400m) beating Eye of the Sky and Never Quit.
- 1989 Segenhoe Stakes (2000m) beating Zamakima and Research.

He was also placed:

- 2nd in the 1987 Caulfield Cup (2400m) behind Lord Reims and Cossack Warrior. Beau Zam was a 3-year old at the time.
- 2nd in the 1989 Chipping Norton Stakes (1600m) behind Flotilla and Research.
- 3rd in the 1989 Queen Elizabeth Stakes (ATC) (2000m) behind Poetic Prince and Dandy Andy.

Beau Zam was trained by Bart Cummings and generally ridden by John Marshall. He was the Australian Horse of the Year for the 1987/88 season.

As well as winning the Queen Elizabeth II Stakes at Canberra in front of the Queen herself, Beau Zam was also ridden in track work by Princess Anne in the lead up to his AJC Derby win.

== Stud career ==
After his racing career, Beau Zam stood at stud in Japan and New Zealand. In 1996 he became the foundation sire at Brighthill Farm, Waikato, New Zealand and he produced over 100 winners.

Beau Zam died on 17 April 2000.

== See also ==
Thoroughbred racing in Australia
