= French Classic Races =

The French Classic Races are a series of Group One Thoroughbred horse races run annually on the flat. The races were instituted in the nineteenth century, taking the British Classic Races as a model.

In the original scheme, one race, the Poule d'Essai, served as the equivalent to the first two British classics, but was later divided into separate races for colts and fillies. The Grand Prix de Paris, for many years the most important and valuable of the French classics, had no British equivalent.

French Classic	Founded	British equivalent
Prix du Jockey Club	1836	Epsom Derby
Poule d'Essai	1840	1000 Guineas & 2000 Guineas
Prix de Diane	1843	Epsom Oaks
Prix Royal-Oak	1861	St. Leger Stakes
Grand Prix de Paris	1863	none
Poule d'Essai des Poulains	1883	2000 Guineas
Poule d'Essai des Pouliches	1883	1000 Guineas

The Prix Royal-Oak was opened to older horses in 1979, making it no longer a direct parallel to the St. Leger, which remains open only to three-year-olds, and is similar to the fourth leg of the United States' Grand Slam, the Breeders' Cup Classic, first run in 1984. It distanced itself further from the St. Leger parallel in 1986, when it opened to geldings, becoming the only classic race in either France or Great Britain in which geldings are allowed to run. (Note that in several other major racing regions, notably North America and Australia, geldings are allowed to run in any race open to intact males if they are otherwise qualified to enter.)
