= Lord Reims =

New Zealand-bred Thoroughbred racehorse

- Sire: Zamazaan (FR)
- Grandsire: Exbury (FR)
- Dam: Right On (NZ)
- Damsire: Ward Drill (IRE)
- Sex: Gelding
- Foaled: 1981
- Country: New Zealand
- Colour: Chestnut
- Breeder: R A Durrant
- Owner: M I H Kitt & J C Brain
- Trainer: Cliff Fenwick, Takanini

Major wins
- Caulfield Cup (1987); Adelaide Cup (1987, 1988, 1989)

Honours
- Lord Reims Stakes at Morphettville Racecourse

Lord Reims was a New Zealand-bred Thoroughbred racehorse who raced with success in Australia.

== Background ==
Lord Reims was a chestnut son of Zamazaan (FR) from the mare Right On (NZ). He was trained in New Zealand by Cliff Fenwick at Takanini.

== Racing career ==
He excelled at staying races with his major race victories including the 1987 MRC Caulfield Cup (defeating the champion Beau Zam) and three successive SAJC Adelaide Cup’s from 1987 to 1989 at Morphettville Racecourse.

The horse died of colic complications at Melbourne airport returning from overseas.

Lord Reims was buried near the winning post at Morphettville and in 2010 the Lord Reims Stakes was named in his honor.

== See also ==
- Repeat winners of horse races
- Thoroughbred racing in New Zealand
