= Adelaide Cup =

Horse race in Adelaide, South Australia

- Class: Group II
- Location: Morphettville Racecourse, South Australia
- Inaugurated: 1864
- Race type: Thoroughbred – Flat racing
- Sponsor: Sportsbet (2026)

Race information
- Distance: 3200 metres
- Surface: Turf
- Track: Left-handed
- Qualification: Three-year-olds and older
- Weight: Handicap
- Purse: A$350,000 (2026)

The Adelaide Cup is a South Australian Jockey Club Group 2 Thoroughbred handicap horse race for three-year-olds and older, run over 3,200 metres at Morphettville Racecourse in Adelaide, Australia on the second Monday in March.

== History ==
The first Adelaide Cup was raced on 21 April 1864 at Thebarton Racecourse, where Mile End is today. The race had stakes of 500 sovereigns with an additional sweep of 50 sovereigns to induce owners from other colonies to compete in the race. Victoria's P. Dowling's Falcon carried 10 stone, 1 pound (141 pounds (64 kg)) and ridden by jockey J. Morrison won the race in a time of 3:50.50. A crowd of 7,000 or 8,000 was present for the event.

The race was run at Weight for Age over two miles from 1864–68. In 1869 the Autumn meeting returned to "the Old Course" (Victoria Park Racecourse) where the Cup was run as a handicap race over two miles. There was no Cup raced in 1870 or 1871. The Cup resumed in 1872 and was run at "The Old Course" over two miles with a smaller stake of 200 sovereigns and an additional sweep of 15 sovereigns. In 1876 the race was held at the "Elder course", Morphettville Racecourse. In 1884 the race was run over 13 furlongs or 1 5/8 miles (~2,600 metres), as was every race held until 1941.

The Totalizator, whose operation on South Australian racecourses became legal in 1880, was abolished by the Totalizator Repeal Act of 1883, and the SAJC suffered a financial collapse. The racecourse was mortgaged and the 1885 Adelaide Cup was held at Flemington, Victoria, and was not held for three more years. In 1889, running of the Cup resumed at Morphettville when Sir Richard Baker and A. O. Whitington took over the course.

Starting on 1 March 1942, there was a ban on racing due to World War II and thus the race was not held in 1942 and 1943.

In 1980 due to renovation of Morphettville Racecourse the race was run at Victoria Park Racecourse and in 2000 the Cup race day was abandoned due to rain and was rescheduled later and also run at Victoria Park.

The highest ever Cup attendance was in 1951 when 50,000 spectators attended.

The cup is held on the second Monday of March since March 2006. Before 2006 it was held in May. It was first run in 1864, just three years after the Melbourne Cup commenced. The day received public holiday status in 1973 and became a major social event in South Australia. In the decade since the move of the Adelaide Cup to March, attendance has fallen to a third of previous levels, seeing 10,500 people trackside in 2015. This is due to use of the public holiday by other "Mad March" events (the Adelaide Festival of the Arts, the associated Adelaide Fringe Festival, the WOMAD world music festival, a touring car race the weekend prior). Thoroughbred Racing SA and the South Australian Jockey Club wish to move the race and its associated public holiday out of March. However, in 2015, the South Australian government Minister for Racing, Leon Bignell said "We can't be at the whim of a racing club that wants to dictate when the public holiday is going to be" and suggests if the race be moved again then it be held on a Saturday.

=== Grade ===
The race was a Principal Race from 1864 until 1979 and a Group 1 race from 1979 until 2006. The race was downgraded from Group 1 to Group 2 status following a decision by the Australian Pattern Committee in 2007.

== 1937 racebook ==
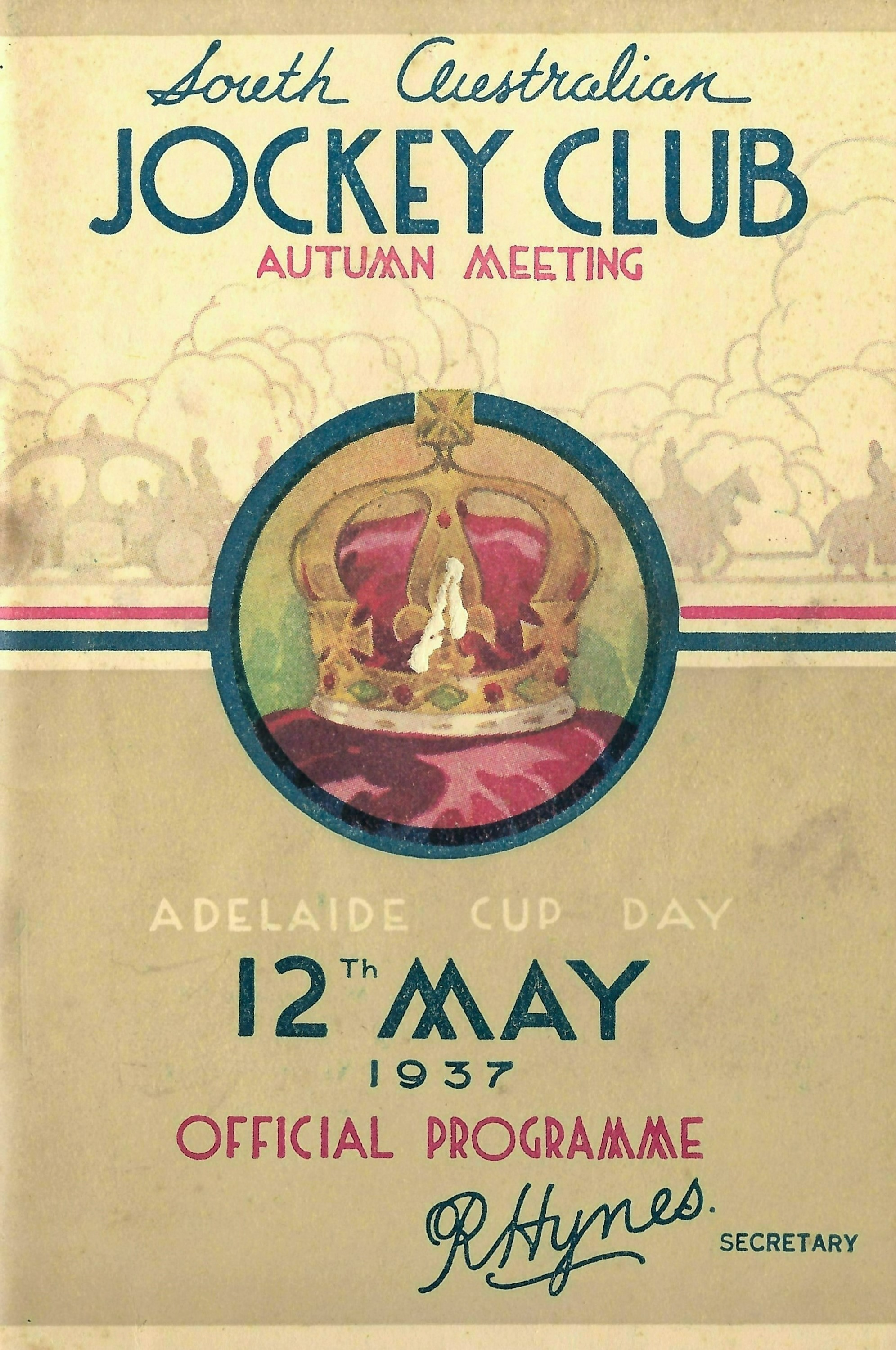
1937 SAJC Adelaide Cup racebook front cover

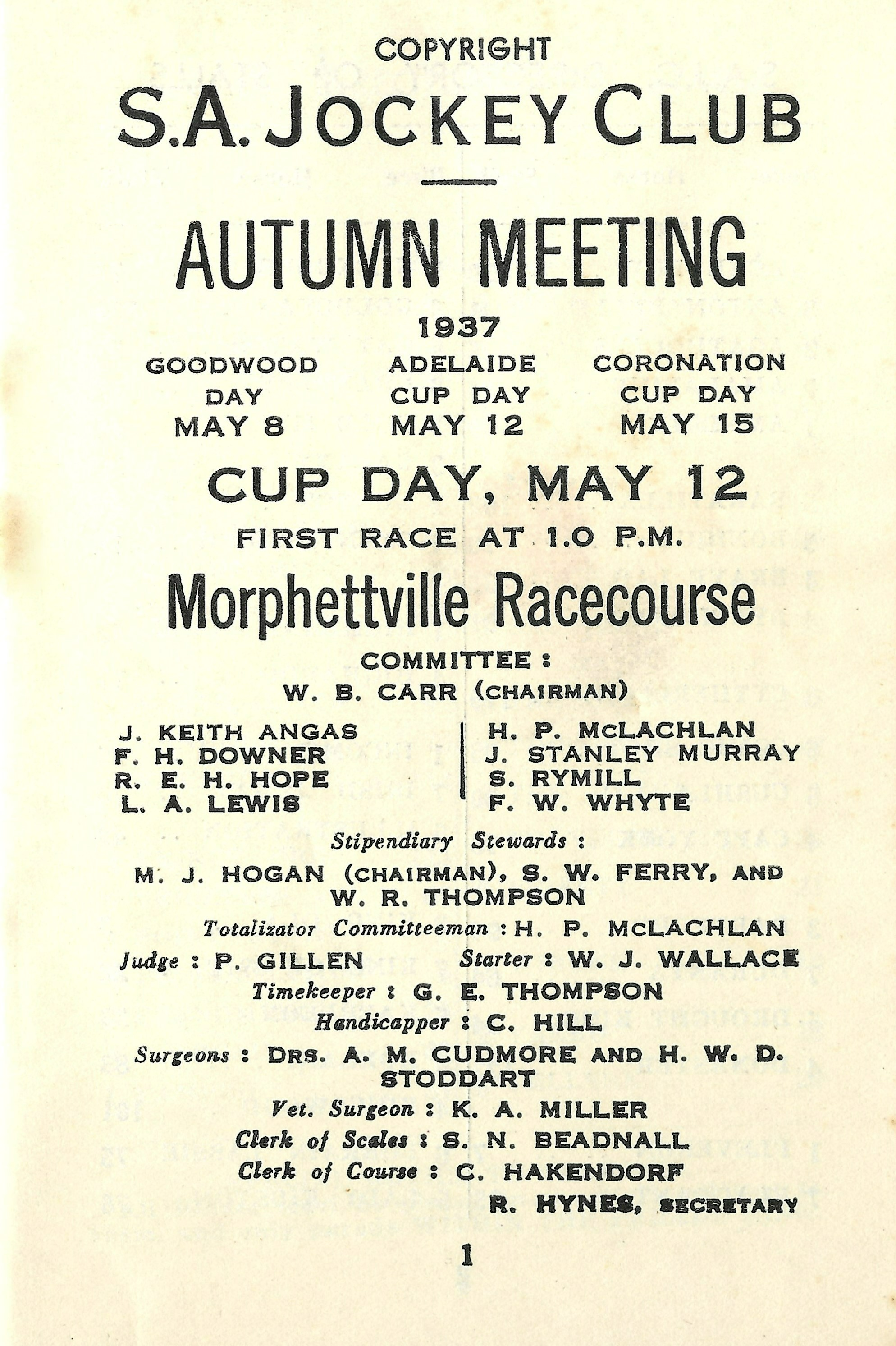
1937 SAJC Adelaide Cup raceday officials

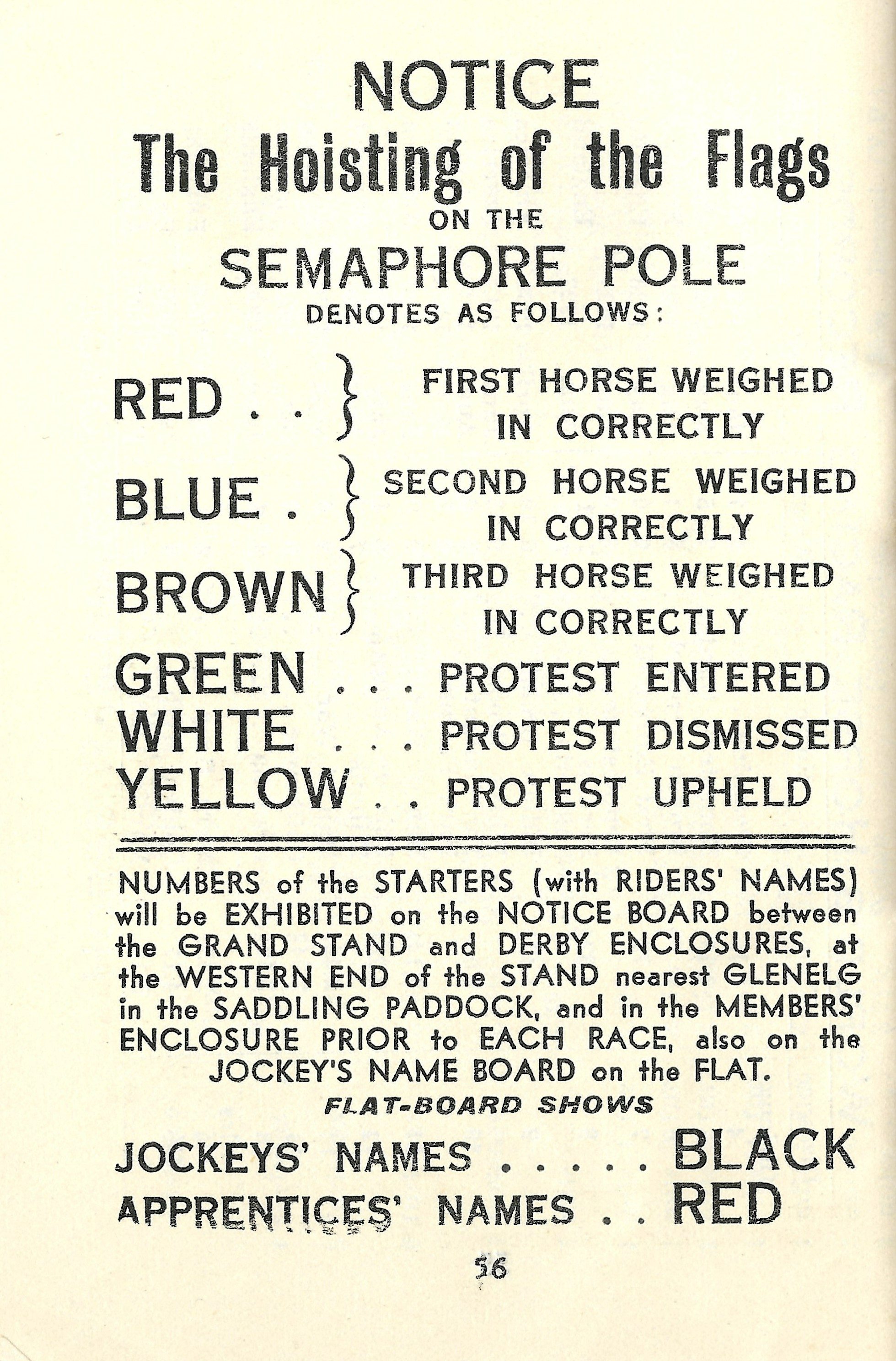
1937 SAJC Adelaide Cup Hoisting of the flags semaphore

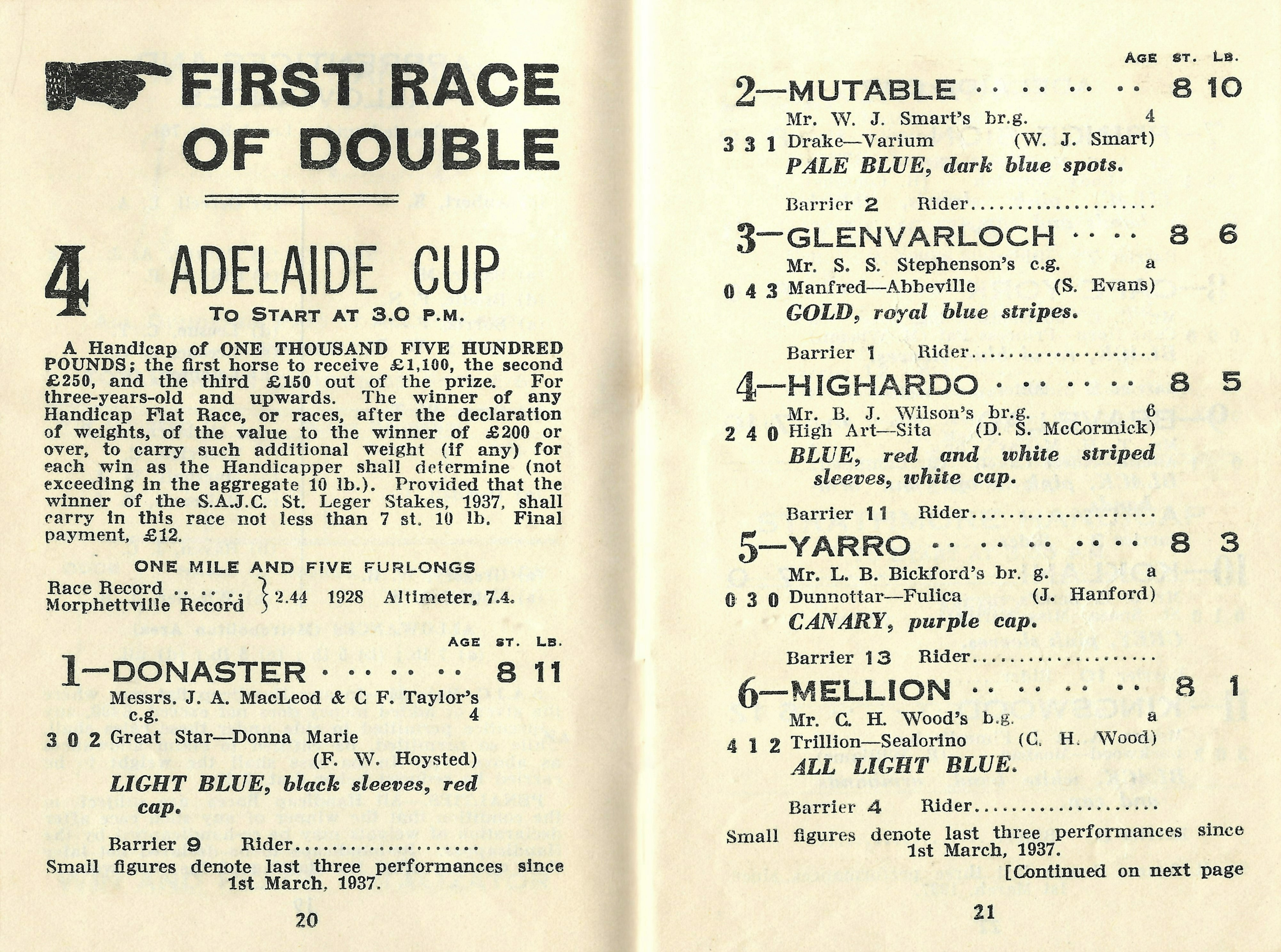
1937 SAJC Adelaide Cup showing the winner, Donaster

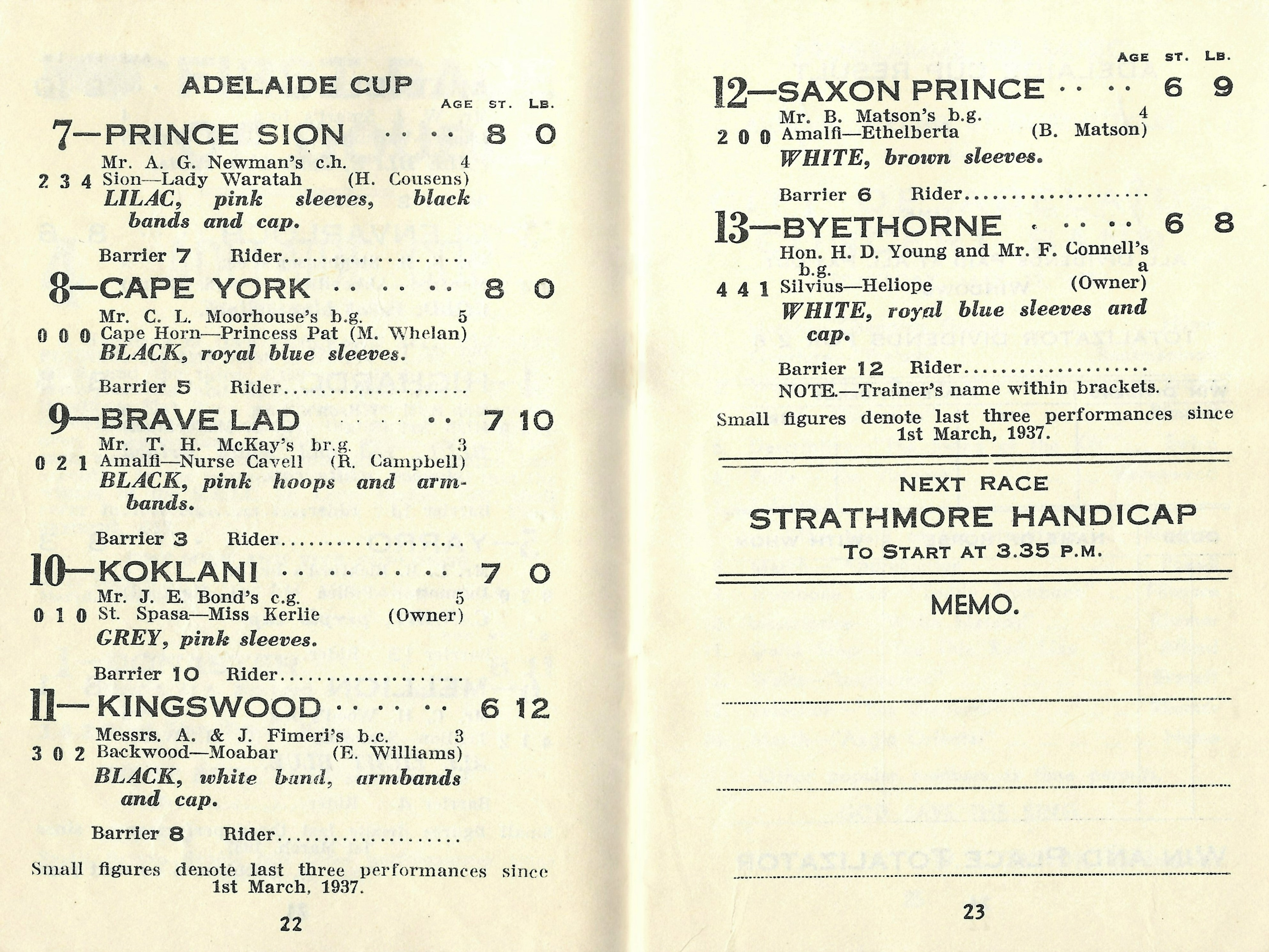
1937 SAJC Adelaide Cup starters & results

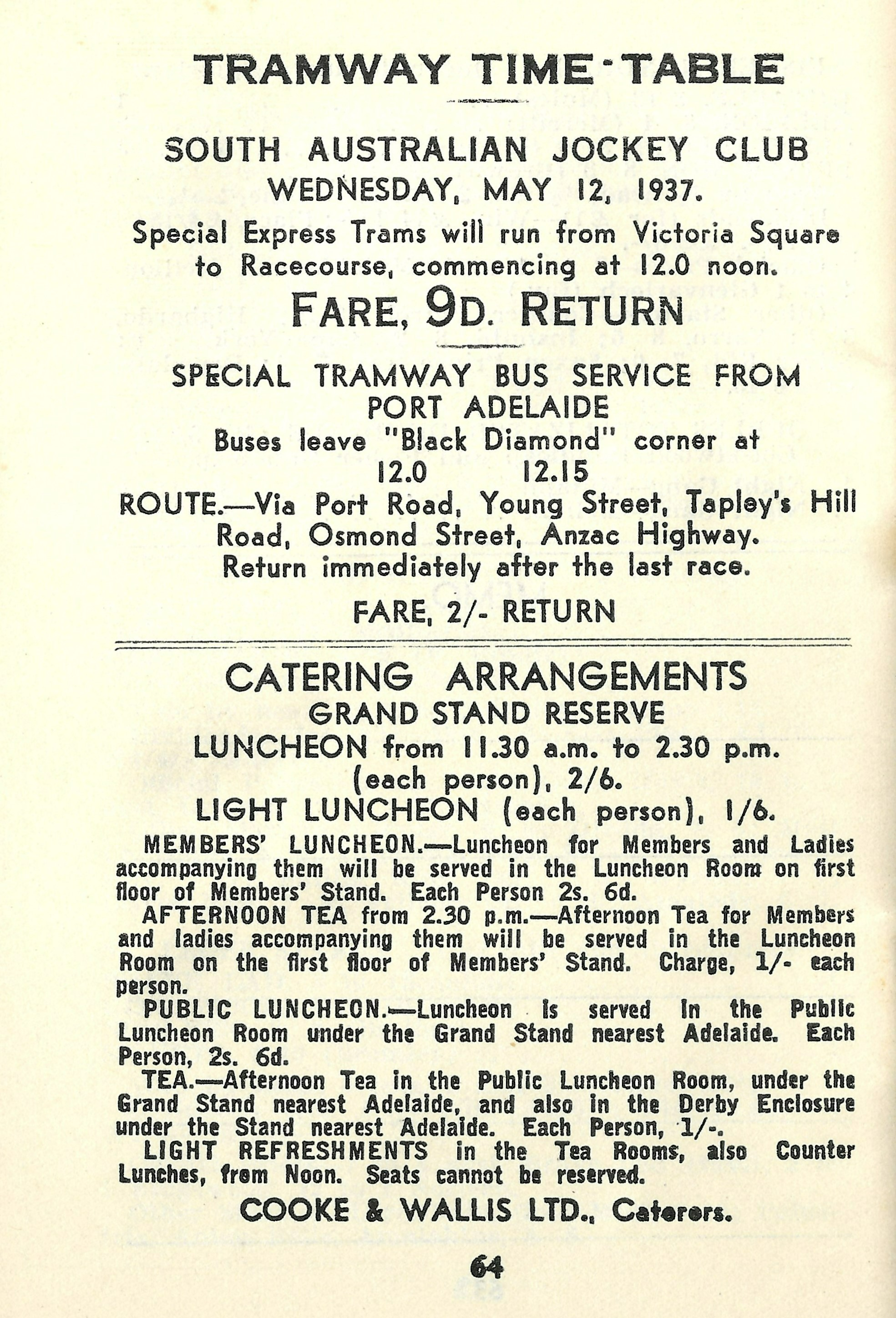
1937 SAJC Adelaide Cup tramway timetable & catering arrangements

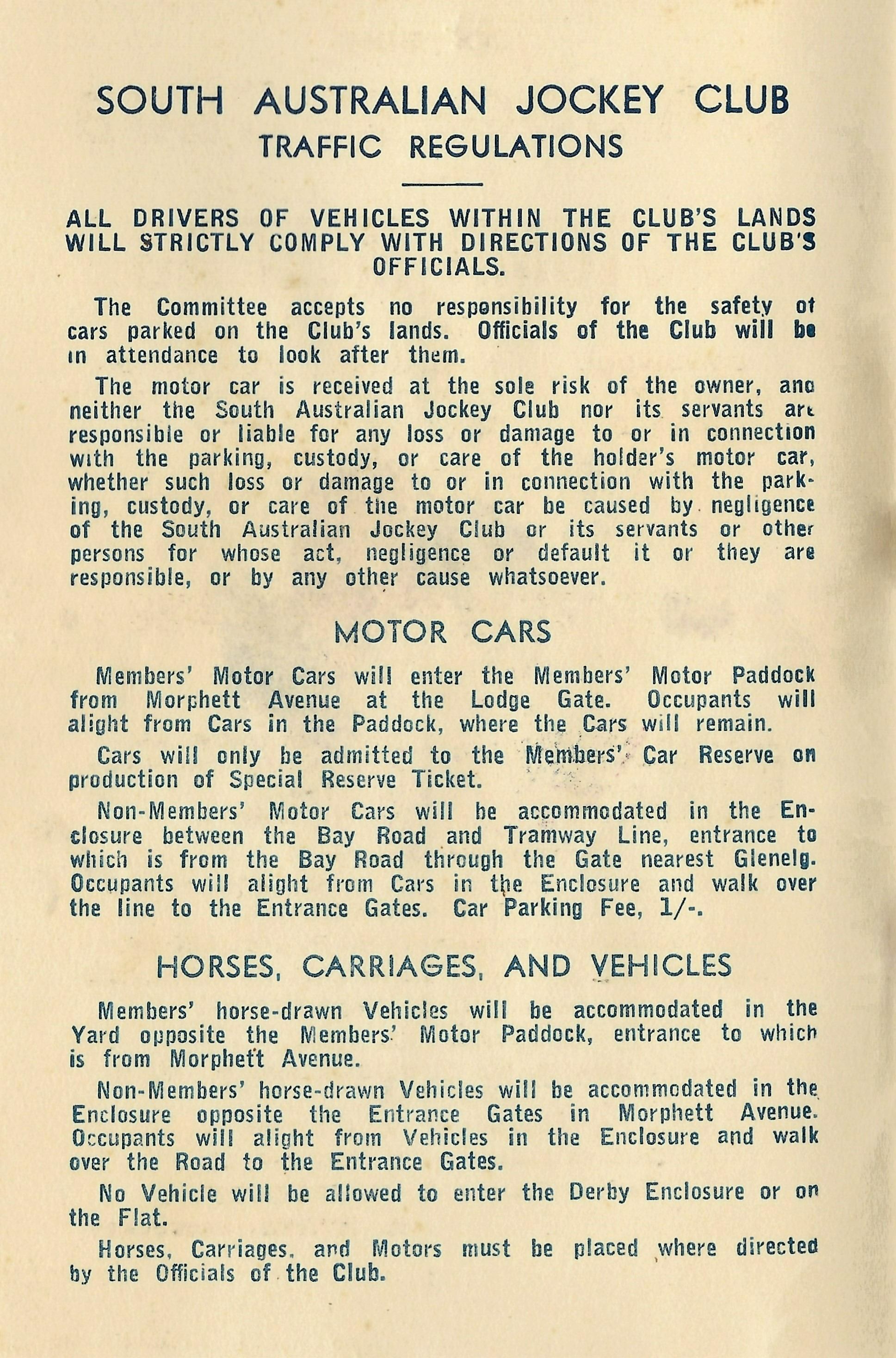
1937 SAJC Adelaide Cup traffic regulations & vehicle instructions

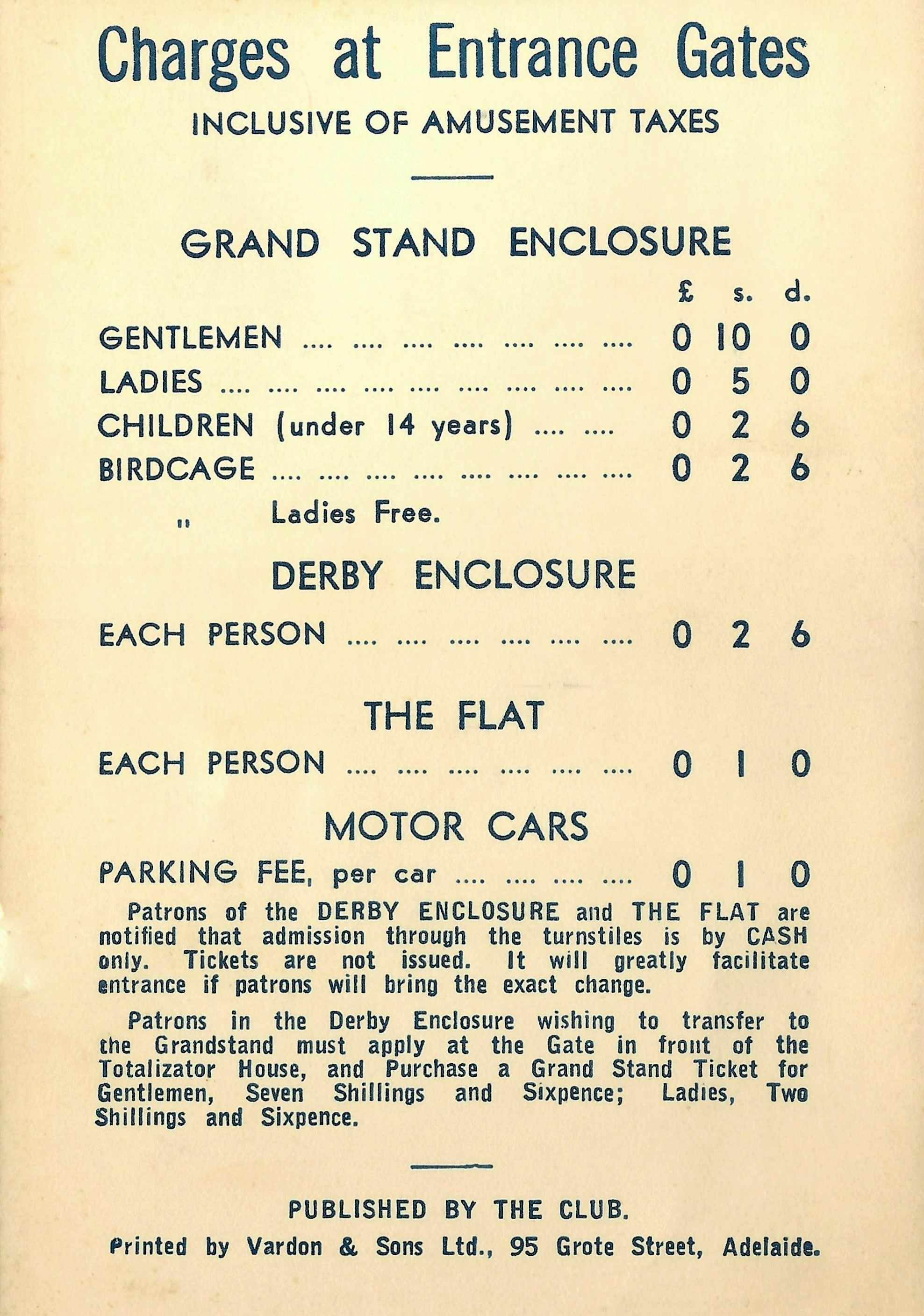
Back cover charges at the entrance gates

== Winners ==
Past winners of the race are as follows.

- 2026 - American Wolf
- 2025 - Silent Surrente
- 2024 - Excelleration
- 2023 - Rebel Racer
- 2022 - Daqiansweet Junior
- 2021 - Good Idea
- 2020 – King Of Leogrance
- 2019 – Surprise Baby
- 2018 – Fanatic
- 2017 – Annus Mirabilis
- 2016 – Purple Smile
- 2015 – Tanby
- 2014 – Outback Joe
- 2013 – Norsqui
- 2012 – Rialya
- 2011 – Muir
- 2010 – Capecover
- 2009 – Zavite
- 2008 – Lacey Underall
- 2007 – Gallic
- 2006 – Exalted Time
- 2005 – Demerger
- 2004 – Pantani
- 2003 – Pillage 'N Plunder
- 2002 – The A Train
- 2001 – Apache King
- 2000 – Bohemiath
- 1999 – Sheer Kingston
- 1998 – The Hind
- 1997 – Cronus
- 1996 – French Resort
- 1995 – Scrupulous
- 1994 – Our Pompeii
- 1993 – Our Pompeii
- 1992 – Subzero
- 1991 – Ideal Centreman
- 1990 – Water Boatman
- 1989 – Lord Reims
- 1988 – Lord Reims
- 1987 – Lord Reims
- 1986 – Mr. Lomondy
- 1985 – Toujours Mio
- 1984 – Moss Kingdom
- 1983 – Amarant
- 1982 – Dealer's Choice
- 1981 – Just A Dash
- 1980 – Yashmak
- 1979 – Panamint
- 1978 – Hyperno
- 1977 – Reckless
- 1976 – Grand Scale
- 1975 – Soulman
- 1974 – Phar Ace
- 1973 – Tavel
- 1972 – Wine Taster
- 1971 – Laelia
- 1970 – Tavel
- 1969 – Gnapur
- 1968 – Rain Lover
- 1967 – Fulmen
- 1966 – Prince Camillo
- 1965 – Hunting Horn
- 1964 – Jamagne
- 1963 – Woolstar
- 1962 – Cheong Sam
- 1961 – Far Away Places
- 1960 – Lourdale
- 1959 – Mac
- 1958 – Star Aim
- 1957 – Borgia
- 1956 – Pushover
- 1955 – Storm Glow
- 1954 – Spearfolio
- 1953 – Royal Pageant
- 1952 – Aldershot
- 1951 – Peerless Fox
- 1950 – Peerless Fox
- 1949 – Colin
- 1948 – Sanctus
- 1947 – Beau Cheval
- 1946 – Little Tich
- 1945 – Blankenburg
- 1944 – Chief Watchman
- 1943 – †race not held
- 1942 – †race not held
- 1941 – Yodvara
- 1940 – Apostrophe
- 1939 – Son Of Aurous
- 1938 – Dartford
- 1937 – Donaster
- 1936 – Cape York
- 1935 – Mellion
- 1934 – Sir Roseland
- 1933 – Infirmiere
- 1932 – Romany Rye
- 1931 – Suzumi
- 1930 – Temptation
- 1929 – Parallana
- 1928 – Altimeter
- 1927 – Three Kings
- 1926 – Spearer
- 1925 – Stralia
- 1924 – Wynette
- 1923 – King Ingoda
- 1922 – Repique
- 1921 – Sir Marco
- 1920 – Wee Gun
- 1919 – Dependence
- 1918 – Elsdon
- 1917 – Greencap
- 1916 – St. Spasa
- 1915 – Naxbery
- 1914 – Hamburg Belle
- 1913 – Midnight Sun
- 1912 – Eye Glass
- 1911 – Eye Glass
- 1910 – Medaglia
- 1909 – Kooringa
- 1908 – Destinist
- 1907 – Spinaway
- 1906 – Dynamite
- 1905 – Troytown
- 1904 – Sport Royal
- 1903 – Sojourner
- 1902 – The Idler
- 1901 – Gunga Din
- 1900 – Tarquin
- 1899 – Contrast
- 1898 – Paul Pry
- 1897 – Mora
- 1896 – Warpaint
- 1895 – Elswick
- 1894 – Port Admiral
- 1893 – Vakeel
- 1892 – Jericho
- 1891 – Stanley
- 1890 – Shootover
- 1889 – The Lawyer
- 1888 – race not held
- 1887 – race not held
- 1886 – race not held
- 1885 – ‡Lord Wilton
- 1884 – Malua
- 1883 – Sting
- 1882 – Euclid
- 1881 – Totalisator
- 1880 – First Water
- 1879 – Banter
- 1878 – Glenormiston
- 1877 – Aldinga
- 1876 – Impudence
- 1875 – Lurline
- 1874 – Ace Of Trumps
- 1873 – Dolphin
- 1872 – Australian Buck
- 1871 – race not held
- 1870 – race not held
- 1869 – Norma
- 1868 – Cupbearer
- 1867 – Cowra
- 1866 – Cowra
- 1865 – Ebor
- 1864 – Falcon

† Race not held due to a ban on war time racing in the state.
‡ Race held at Flemington, Victoria after financial collapse of the SAJC which followed the Totalizator Repeal Act 1883.

== See also ==
- List of Australian Group races
- Group races
