= Zamazaan (horse) =

French-bred Thoroughbred racehorse

- Sire: Exbury
- Grandsire: Le Haar
- Dam: Toyama
- Damsire: Tulyar
- Sex: Stallion
- Foaled: 1965
- Country: France
- Colour: Chestnut
- Breeder: HH Aga Khan IV
- Owner: HH Aga Khan IV
- Trainer: François Mathet
- Record: 12: 5-2-2
- Earnings: FF 683888

Major wins
- Prix du Conseil Municipal (1968); Prix Jean Prat (1969)

Awards
- Leading sire in Australia (1988)

Zamazaan (1965 – 8 April 1990) was a French Thoroughbred racehorse and Champion sire in New Zealand and Australia.

Zamazaan was bred by the HH Aga Khan IV.

== Racing career ==
Zamazaan was a winner of 5 stakes races from 2,400 metres to 3,100 metres.

He retired from the track in 1969.

== Stud career ==
He was syndicated for a then record NZ$200,000 and sent to stand at stud beginning in the 1970 season at Keith Burley's Carlyle Stud in East Tāmaki near Auckland, New Zealand.

He won the:

- Dewar Stallion Trophy award in 1977–8 with progeny earnings of $490,595 (excluding trophies).
- Champion New Zealand Sire in 1985-86

Zamazaan sired 58 stakes winners for 123 stakes wins including:

- Beau Zam (out of Belle Cherie by Sovereign Edition)
- Gelsomino (Salima by Copenhagen II), winner of the 1982 Flight Stakes, 1983 Shannon Stakes and 1984 Frederick Clissold Handicap.
- Good Lord (Love In Bloom by Todman), winner of the 1977 and 1978 Wellington Cup and 1978 Sydney Cup
- Lord Reims (Right On by Ward Drill), winner of the 1987 Caulfield Cup and the Adelaide Cup in 1987, 1988 and 1989
- Phizam (Phius by Oncidium), winner of the 1985 Perth Cup (2400m)
- Samasaan (Desert Love by Home Guard), winner of the 1985 New Zealand Cup and 1986 Wellington Cup
- Veloso (Top of The Pops by Bismark II), winner of the 1983 Sydney Cup and Mackinnon Stakes and placed in multiple Group 1 races.

Zamazaan was the dam-sire of:

- Doriemus (Norman Pentaquad - Golden Woods), winner of the 1995 Caulfield Cup and Melbourne Cup.
- Exocet (War Hawk II - Grand Zam), winner of the 1989 New Zealand Cup.
- Senator (Sound Reason - Platinum Lass), winner of the 1996 Auckland Cup.
- The Filbert (Souvran - Fauxzann), winner of the 1985 New Zealand Stakes.

Zamazaan's legacy has also continued with the following:

- Elvstroem
- Highland Reel
- Idaho
- Nature Strip

== Sire line tree ==
- Zamazaan
  - Good Lord
  - Happy Union
  - Bright Halo
  - Exemplify
  - Affinity
  - Phizam
    - Double Take
  - Zamination
    - Mr Prudent
  - Veloso
  - Laud Eulogy
    - Laud Peregrine
  - Samasaan
  - Lord Reims
  - Sir Zephyr
  - Il Comandante
  - Beau Zam
  - Mr Bunnythorpe
  - Zamoff

== See also ==
- Thoroughbred racing in New Zealand
