= 1994 King George VI and Queen Elizabeth Stakes =

44th King George VI and Queen Elizabeth Stakes
- King George VI and Queen Elizabeth Stakes
- Location: Ascot Racecourse
- Date: 25 July 1994
- Winning horse: King's Theatre (IRE)
- Jockey: Mick Kinane
- Trainer: Henry Cecil (GB)
- Owner: Sheikh Mohammed

The 1994 King George VI and Queen Elizabeth Stakes was a horse race held at Ascot Racecourse on Saturday 23 July 1994. It was the 44th running of the King George VI and Queen Elizabeth Stakes.

The winner was Sheikh Mohammed's King's Theatre, a three-year-old bay colt trained at Newmarket, Suffolk by Henry Cecil and ridden by Mick Kinane. Owner, trainer and jockey had previously won the race with Belmez in 1990. Henry Cecil had also won the race with Reference Point in 1987, whilst Sheikh Mohammed had won with the Michael Stoute-trained Opera House in 1993.

== The race ==
The race attracted a field of twelve runners: ten from the United Kingdom, and two from France. The favourite for the race was the three-year-old colt Erhaab who had won the Epsom Derby before finishing third in the Eclipse Stakes. The French contenders were Apple Tree, the winner of the Preis von Europa, Turf Classic, Coronation Cup and Grand Prix de Saint-Cloud) and Petit Loup, who had won the Gran Premio di Milano on his most recent start. on his most recent appearance. The other leading contenders included Ezzoud who had won the International Stakes and beaten Erhaab in the Eclipse, White Muzzle, who had finished second in the race in the previous year, the St Leger Stakes winner Bob's Return and King's Theatre, who had won the Racing Post Trophy in 1993 before finishing second in both the Epsom Derby and the Irish Derby in 1994. The other runners were Chatoyant (Brigadier Gerard Stakes), Foyer (King Edward VII Stakes), Environment Friend (Eclipse Stakes), Wagon Master (Princess of Wales's Stakes) and Urgent Request. Erhaab headed the betting at odds of 7/2 ahead of White Muzzle (9/2), Apple Tree (5/1) and Bob's Return (15/2). King's Theatre, Chatoyant, Chatoyant and Ezzoud were next in the market on 12/1.

As the horses left the starting stalls, Ezzoud swerved sharply, unseating his rider Walter Swinburn, but continued to gallop alongside the other horses. Urgent Request took the early lead and set the pace from Bob's Return, Wagon Master and Petit Loup. Bob's Return took the advantage with five furlongs left to run and led the field into the straight ahead of Wagon Master and King's Theatre. Wagon Master went to the front two furlongs from the finish, at which point the riderless Ezzoud veered to the inside, hampering several of the runners. King's Theatre overtook Wagon Master a furlong from the finish and held off the late challenge of White Muzzle to win by one and a quarter lengths, with Wagon Master two and a half lengths back in third. Apple Tree took fourth ahead of Petit Loup, Foyer, Erhaab and the weakening Bob's Return. The last three finishers were Chatoyant, Environment Friend and the early leader Urgent Request.

== Race details ==
- Sponsor: De Beers
- Purse: £431,464; First prize: £265,808
- Surface: Turf
- Going: Good to Firm
- Distance: 12 furlongs
- Number of runners: 12
- Winner's time: 2:28.92

== Full result ==
Pos.	Marg.	Horse (bred)	Age	Jockey	Trainer (Country)	Odds
1		King's Theatre (IRE)	3	Mick Kinane	Henry Cecil (GB)	12/1
2	1¼	White Muzzle (GB)	4	Yutaka Take	Peter Chapple-Hyam (GB)	9/2
3	2½	Wagon Master (FR)	4	Richard Hills	Alec Stewart (GB)	20/1
4	¾	Apple Tree (FR)	5	Thierry Jarnet	André Fabre (FR)	5/1
5	½	Petit Loup (USA)	5	Freddy Head	Criquette Head-Maarek (FR)	16/1
6	1	Foyer (GB)	3	Frankie Dettori	Michael Stoute (GB)	12/1
7	5	Erhaab (USA)	3	Willie Carson	John Dunlop (GB)	7/2 fav
8	shd	Bob's Return (IRE)	4	Philip Robinson	Mark Tompkins (GB)	15/2
9	3½	Chatoyant (GB)	4	Pat Eddery	Bill Watts (GB)	12/1
10	2	Environment Friend (GB)	6	Michael Roberts	James Fanshawe (GB)	16/1
11	25	Urgent Request (IRE)	4	Richard Quinn	Reg Akehurst (GB)	25/1
UR		Ezzoud (IRE)	5	Walter Swinburn	Michael Stoute (GB)	12/1

- Abbreviations: nse = nose; nk = neck; shd = head; hd = head; dist = distance; UR = unseated rider

== Winner's details ==
Further details of the winner, King's Theatre

- Sex: Colt
- Foaled: 1 May 1991
- Country: Ireland
- Sire: Sadler's Wells; Dam: Regal Beauty (Princely Native)
- Owner: Sheikh Mohammed
- Breeder: Michael Poland
