= 1994 Prix de l'Arc de Triomphe =

- Location: Longchamp Racecourse
- Date: October 2, 1994
- Winning horse: Carnegie

The 1994 Prix de l'Arc de Triomphe was a horse race held at Longchamp on Sunday 2 October 1994. It was the 73rd running of the Prix de l'Arc de Triomphe.

The winner was Carnegie, a three-year-old colt trained in France by André Fabre. The winning jockey was Thierry Jarnet.

== Race details ==
- Sponsor: Forte Group
- Purse: 6,800,000 F; First prize: 4,000,000 F
- Going: Good to Soft
- Distance: 2,400 metres
- Number of runners: 20
- Winner's time: 2m 31.1s

== Full result ==
Pos.	Marg.	Horse	Age	Jockey	Trainer (Country)
1		Carnegie	3	Thierry Jarnet	André Fabre (FR)
2	snk	Hernando	4	Cash Asmussen	François Boutin (FR)
3	½	Apple Tree	5	John Reid	André Fabre (FR)
4	snk	Ezzoud	5	Walter Swinburn	Michael Stoute (GB)
5	shd	Bright Moon	4	Olivier Peslier	André Fabre (FR)
6	1	White Muzzle	4	Yutaka Take	Peter Chapple-Hyam (GB)
7	nk	Only Royale	5	Frankie Dettori	Luca Cumani (GB)
8	¾	Lando	4	Michael Roberts	Heinz Jentzsch (GER)
9	hd	Millkom	3	Jean-René Dubosc	Jean-Claude Rouget (FR)
10	½	King's Theatre	3	Michael Kinane	Henry Cecil (GB)
11	nk	Celtic Arms	3	Gérald Mossé	Pascal Bary (FR)
12	¾	Richard of York	4	Sylvain Guillot	André Fabre (FR)
13	¾	Intrepidity	4	Pat Eddery	André Fabre (FR)
14	1	Much Better	5	Jorge Ricardo	João Luiz Maciel (BRZ)
15	nse	Broadway Flyer	3	Michael Hills	John Hills (GB)
16	1½	Sierra Madre	3	Freddy Head	Pascal Bary (FR)
17	2	Big Tobin	5	Maurizio Pasquale	Luigi Camici (ITY)
18	2	Truly a Dream	3	Guy Guignard	Robert Collet (FR)
19	6	Vert Amande	6	Dominique Boeuf	Élie Lellouche (FR)
20	8	Dancienne	4	Yukio Okabe	Élie Lellouche (FR)

- Abbreviations: nse = nose; shd = short-head; hd = head; snk = short-neck; nk = neck

== Winner's details ==
Further details of the winner, Carnegie.

- Sex: Colt
- Foaled: 26 February 1991
- Country: Ireland
- Sire: Sadler's Wells; Dam: Detroit (Riverman)
- Owner: Sheikh Mohammed
- Breeder: Swettenham Stud
