= 1992 Prix de l'Arc de Triomphe =

French horse race in Paris

- Location: Longchamp Racecourse
- Date: October 4, 1992
- Winning horse: Subotica

The 1992 Prix de l'Arc de Triomphe was a horse race held at Longchamp on Sunday 4 October 1992. It was the 71st running of the Prix de l'Arc de Triomphe.

The winner was Subotica, a four-year-old colt trained in France by André Fabre. The winning jockey was Thierry Jarnet.

== Race details ==
- Sponsor: CIGA Hotels
- Purse: 8,500,000 F; First prize: 5,000,000 F
- Going: Soft
- Distance: 2,400 metres
- Number of runners: 18
- Winner's time: 2m 39.0s

== Full result ==
| Pos. | Marg. | Horse | Age | Jockey | Trainer (Country) |
|---|---|---|---|---|---|
| 1 | | Subotica | 4 | Thierry Jarnet | André Fabre (FR) |
| 2 | nk | User Friendly | 3 | George Duffield | Clive Brittain (GB) |
| 3 | 2 | Vert Amande | 4 | Éric Legrix | Élie Lellouche (FR) |
| 4 | 1½ | St Jovite | 3 | Christy Roche | Jim Bolger (IRE) |
| 5 | shd | Saganeca | 4 | William Mongil | Antonio Spanu (FR) |
| 6 | ¾ | Dr Devious | 3 | John Reid | Peter Chapple-Hyam (GB) |
| 7 | 2 | Arcangues | 4 | Gérald Mossé | André Fabre (FR) |
| 8 | nk | Jolypha | 3 | Pat Eddery | André Fabre (FR) |
| 9 | nse | Verveine | 3 | Dominique Boeuf | Élie Lellouche (FR) |
| 10 | ¾ | Dear Doctor | 5 | Cash Asmussen | John Hammond (FR) |
| 11 | ½ | Mashaallah | 4 | Steve Cauthen | John Gosden (GB) |
| 12 | nk | Petit Loup | 3 | Walter Swinburn | Criquette Head (FR) |
| 13 | nk | Magic Night | 4 | Alain Badel | Philippe Demercastel (FR) |
| 14 | 1½ | Sapience | 6 | Richard Quinn | David Elsworth (GB) |
| 15 | 1½ | Saddlers' Hall | 4 | Willie Carson | Michael Stoute (GB) |
| 16 | 1½ | Market Booster | 3 | Michael Kinane | Dermot Weld (IRE) |
| 17 | ½ | Seattle Rhyme | 3 | Michael Roberts | David Elsworth (GB) |
| 18 | 8 | Polytain | 3 | Frankie Dettori | Antonio Spanu (FR) |

- Abbreviations: nse = nose; shd = short-head; nk = neck

== Winner's details ==
Further details of the winner, Subotica.

- Sex: Colt
- Foaled: 13 February 1988
- Country: France
- Sire: Pampabird; Dam: Terre de Feu (Busted)
- Owner: Olivier Lecerf
- Breeder: Paul de Moussac
