= Apple Tree (horse) =

French-bred Thoroughbred racehorse

- Sire: Bikala
- Grandsire: Kalamoun
- Dam: Pomme Rose
- Damsire: Carvin
- Sex: Stallion
- Foaled: 6 March 1989
- Died: 16 December 2018
- Country: France
- Colour: Chestnut
- Breeder: Paul de Moussac
- Owner: Paul de Mousac; Sultan Mohammed al Kabeer
- Trainer: André Fabre; Bill Mott
- Record: 26: 7-4-5
- Earnings: £855,001

Major wins
- Prix Greffulhe (1992); Preis von Europa (1992); Prix du Prince d'Orange (1993); Turf Classic (1993); Coronation Cup (1994); Grand Prix de Saint-Cloud (1994)

Apple Tree (6 March 1989 – 16 December 2018) is a French Thoroughbred racehorse and sire. During a racing career which lasted from September 1991 until October 1995 he competed in France, Germany, England, the United States and Japan, winning seven of his twenty-six races. After showing promise as a two-year-old he won the Prix Greffulhe and the Preis von Europa in 1992. As a four-year-old he ran prominently in several major races before winning the Prix du Prince d'Orange and the Turf Classic. He reached his peak as a five-year-old in 1994 when he defeated top-class international fields in the Coronation Cup and the Grand Prix de Saint-Cloud. After his retirement from racing he stood as a breeding stallion with limited success.

== Background ==
Apple Tree is a chestnut horse standing 16.2 hands high with three white socks bred in France by Paul de Moussac. He was sired by Bikala, who won the Prix du Jockey Club in 1981 and the Prix Ganay in 1982. The best of his other offspring was probably Polytain whose wins included the Prix du Jockey Club. Apple Tree's dam Pomme Rose won the Prix Imprudence in 1971 and produced several other winners including the Prix du Conseil de Paris winner Noir Et Or.

The colt was sent into training with André Fabre in France and was ridden in most of his races by Thierry Jarnet.

== Racing career ==
=== 1991: two-year-old season ===
After finishing seventh on his racecourse debut at Saint-Cloud Racecourse in September, Apple Tree recorded his first victory at Compiègne on 10 September. On his third and final appearance as a juvenile he was stepped up in class and finished sixth behind Glaieul in the Group One Critérium de Saint-Cloud.

=== 1992: three-year-old season ===
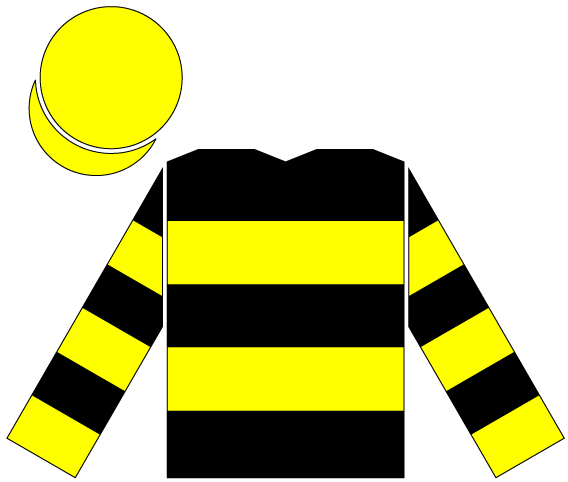
Racing colours of Paul de Moussac

On his three-year-old debut, Apple Tree contested the Prix Greffulhe (a trial race for the Prix du Jockey Club) over 2100 metres at Longchamp Racecourse in April and started the 6.9/1 fourth choice behind Cristofori (Prix de Condé), Break Bread (Prix Yacowlef) and Silver Kite. After turning into the straight in fifth place, he took the lead 200 metres from the finish and won by two lengths from Break Bread. In the Prix Lupin over the same course and distance in May and finished third behind Johann Quatz and Contested Bid. At Chantilly Racecourse on 7 June he finished seventh of the seventeen runners in the Prix du Jockey Club, seven and a half lengths behind the winner Polytain.

After a three-month break Apple Tree returned in the Prix Niel over 2400 metres at Longchamp in September. He finished third behind Songlines and Petit Loup with Johann Quatz and Polytain unplaced. Two weeks later he was sent to Germany for the Preis von Europa at Cologne in which he was matched against the Prels Der Privatbanklers Merck, Finck & Co winner Platini. After racing in third he took the lead 200 metres from the finish and recorded his first Group One victory as he won by one and three quarter lengths from Platini.

=== 1993: four-year-old season ===
The early part of Apple Tree's third season saw him running consistently well in top-class middle-distance races without winning. He finished fourth to Marildo in the Prix d'Harcourt, second to Zindabad in the Jockey Club Stakes, second to Modhish in the Prix Jean de Chaudenay, third to Opera House in the Coronation Cup, second to User Friendly in the Grand Prix de Saint-Cloud and seventh behind Monsun in the Aral-Pokal. In September Apple Tree was dropped to Group Three class for the Prix du Prince d'Orange over 2000 metres on soft ground at Longchamp and started odds-on favourite. Racing in blinkers, he took the lead 300 metres from the finish and drew away to win by two and a half lengths from Marildo.

Mike Smith took over from Jarnet when Apple Tree was sent to the United States to contest the Grade I Turf Classic at Belmont Park on 9 October. Shortly before the race he had been bought for an undisclosed sum by Sultan Mohammed al Kabeer. He was made the 4.7/1 third choice in the betting behind the leading North American turf performers Star of Cozzene (Arlington Million) and Fraise (Breeders' Cup Turf). Smith settled Apple Tree in fourth place as Solar Splendour set a slow pace from Fraise and Star of Cozzene. Apple Tree moved up on the outside on the final turn, overtook Solar Slendour well inside the final furlong and won by two and a quarter lengths. Four weeks later, the colt was sent to California for the Breeders' Cup Turf at Santa Anita Park. With Smith again in the saddle he started at odds of 11/1 but started slowly and never looked likely to win, finishing ninth of the fourteen runners behind Kotashaan.

=== 1994: five-year-old season ===
In the spring of 1994, Apple Tree finished fourth to Urban Sea in the Prix d'Harcourt and second to Silver Wisp in the Jockey Club Stakes. On 3 June he ran for the second time in the Coronation Cup and started at odds of 12/1 in an eleven-runner field. Intrepidity started favourite whilst the other runners included White Muzzle (runner-up in the King George VI & Queen Elizabeth Stakes and Prix de l'Arc de Triomphe), Urban Sea, Royal Ballerina (second in the Irish Oaks), Monsun, Only Royale and Environment Friend. After being restrained towards the rear of the field by Jarnet he switched to the outside in the straight and began to make rapid progress. He overtook Environment Friend inside the final furlong and won "comfortably" by a length, with Blush Rambler taking third ahead of Urban Sea and White Muzzle. After the race Jarnet commented "He's a very genuine horse but he doesn't like being tightened up between other horses and prefers to run his own race" before adding "I wasn't here to get revenge, I rode the horse because of his ability", a reference to his somewhat unlucky defeat on Subotica in the 1992 edition of the races.

A month after his win at Epsom, Apple Tree started favourite for the Grand Prix de Saint-Cloud in which he was opposed by Muhtarram, Bright Moon (Prix Minerve, Prix de Pomone, Grand Prix d'Evry), Marchand de Sable (Critérium de Saint-Cloud), Kornado (Prels Der Privatbanklers Merck, Finck & Co) and Marildo. He raced towards the rear of the field before producing a strong late run to catch Muhtarram in the final strides and won by head to claim his second consecutive Group One victory. Apple Tree then started 5/1 third favourite for the King George VI & Queen Elizabeth Stakes at Ascot Racecourse but finished fourth in a very rough race won by King's Theatre.

After a brief summer break, Apple Tree returned in the Prix Foy (a trial race for the Prix de l'Arc de Trimomphe) at Longchamp in September in which he finished third behind Richard of York and Intrepidity with the odds-on favourite Hernando in fourth. In the 1994 Prix de l'Arc de Triomphe Apple Tree was ridden by John Reid and started at odds of 14/1 in a twenty-runner field. He turned into the straight in seventh place, and recovered after struggling to obtain a clear run to join the leaders in the final furlong. In a "blanket finish" he took third place, beaten a short neck and half a length by Carnegie and Hernando. On his final start for Fabre, Apple Tree was sent to Tokyo Racecourse for the Japan Cup on 27 November but finished unplaced behind Marvelous Crown.

In 1995 Apple Tree was transferred to race in North America where he was trained by Bill Mott. He made only one appearance for his new trainer, finishing ninth in a Grade III race at Meadowlands Racetrack in October.

== Stud career ==
At the end of his racing career Apple Tree was retired to stud. After standing for several years at the French National Stud he moved to the Beech Tree Stud in Somerset in 2009. He has had little success as a sire of winners of flat races but has sired some good National Hunt horses including Lough Derg whose win included the Long Walk Hurdle. As of 2015, he was standing a fee of £1,500. He died on 16 December 2018.

== Pedigree ==
Pedigree of Apple Tree (FR), chestnut stallion, 1989
Sire Bikala (IRE) 1978	Kalamoun (GB); 1970	Zeddaan	Grey Sovereign
Sire Bikala (IRE) 1978	Kalamoun (GB); 1970	Zeddaan	Vareta
Sire Bikala (IRE) 1978	Kalamoun (GB); 1970	Khairunissa	Prince Bio
Sire Bikala (IRE) 1978	Kalamoun (GB); 1970	Khairunissa	Palariva
Sire Bikala (IRE) 1978	Irish Bird (USA); 1970	Sea-Bird	Dan Cupid
Sire Bikala (IRE) 1978	Irish Bird (USA); 1970	Sea-Bird	Sicalade
Sire Bikala (IRE) 1978	Irish Bird (USA); 1970	Irish Lass	Sayajirao
Sire Bikala (IRE) 1978	Irish Bird (USA); 1970	Irish Lass	Scollata
Dam Pomme Rose (FR) 1968	Carvin (FR); 1962	Marino	Worden
Dam Pomme Rose (FR) 1968	Carvin (FR); 1962	Marino	Buena Vista
Dam Pomme Rose (FR) 1968	Carvin (FR); 1962	Coraline	Fine Top
Dam Pomme Rose (FR) 1968	Carvin (FR); 1962	Coraline	Copelina
Dam Pomme Rose (FR) 1968	Sentinelle (FR); 1963	Antler	Hyder Ali
Dam Pomme Rose (FR) 1968	Sentinelle (FR); 1963	Antler	Tomorrow
Dam Pomme Rose (FR) 1968	Sentinelle (FR); 1963	Savanne	Nosca
Dam Pomme Rose (FR) 1968	Sentinelle (FR); 1963	Savanne	Pampas (Family:20-c)
