= Hernando (horse) =

French-bred Thoroughbred racehorse

- Sire: Niniski
- Grandsire: Nijinsky
- Dam: Whakilyric
- Damsire: Miswaki
- Sex: Stallion
- Foaled: 8 February 1990
- Died: February 2013 (aged 22–23)
- Country: France
- Colour: Bay
- Breeder: Stavros Niarchos
- Owner: Stavros Niarchos
- Trainer: François Boutin; John Hammond
- Record: 20: 7-4-1
- Earnings: £1,302,490

Major wins
- Prix de Suresnes (1993); Prix Lupin (1993); Prix du Jockey Club (1993); Prix Niel (1993); Prix Gontaut-Biron (1994, 1995)

Hernando (8 February 1990 – February 2013) was a French Thoroughbred racehorse and sire. He established himself as one of the best European colts of his generation in 1993 by winning the Prix Lupin, Prix du Jockey Club and Prix Niel and finishing second in the Irish Derby. As a four-year-old he won the Prix Gontaut-Biron and finished a close second in the Prix de l'Arc de Triomphe. In 1995 he won a second Prix Gontaut-Biron and was placed in both the Turf Classic Invitational and the Japan Cup. After he retired from racing, he became a very successful breeding stallion in England. He died in February 2013.

== Background ==
Hernando was a bay horse with a white blaze and a white sock on his left front leg, bred in France by his owner Stavros Niarchos. He was sired by the American-bred stallion Niniski, who won the Irish St. Leger and the Prix Royal-Oak in 1979 before going on to sire many good staying horses including Petoski, Minster Son and Lomitas (Preis von Europa, sire of Danedream). Hernando's dam Whakilyric was a high-class racemare who won the Prix du Calvados in 1986. The colt was sent into training with François Boutin at Chantilly and was ridden in all of his major races by the American jockey Cash Asmussen.

== Racing career ==
=== 1993: three-year-old season ===
On his three-year-old debut, Hernando contested the Prix Rieur over 2100 metres at Saint-Cloud Racecourse on 25 March and finished second, beaten a head by Fort Wood, a colt who went on to win the Grand Prix de Paris. The colt recorded his first success of the year in a minor race at Longchamp Racecourse in April and then won the Listed Prix de Suresnes over 2100 metres at the same track on 2 May. Two weeks later Hernando was moved up in class for the Group One Prix Lupin in which he was matched against the undefeated British-trained Armiger, winner of the Racing Post Trophy and the Chester Vase. Asmusssen positioned the colt in third place behind Armiger before moving forward to challenge for the lead 300 metres from the finish. He gained the advantage in the closing stages and won by a neck from Armiger, with Dernieur Empereur taking third place.

On 6 June, Hernando started 2/1 favourite for the 156th running of the Prix du Jockey Club over 2400 metres at Chantilly Racecourse. Fort Wood and Dernieur Empereur were again in opposition, whilst the other contenders included Hunting Hawk (winner of the Prix Greffulhe), Regency (Prix Hocquart), Sin Kiang (Prix La Force) and the Criquette Head-trained Freezing Bird. Hernando drew away from his rivals in the closing stages to win by two and a half lengths from Dernieur Empereur, with Hunting Hawk taking third ahead of the British challenger Newton's Law. Three weeks later, the colt was matched against The Derby winner Commander in Chief in the Irish Derby over one and a half miles at the Curragh Racecourse. Hernando tracked the leaders before moving up into second place behind Commander in Chief approaching the final furlong and finished three quarters of a length second to the British colt after a sustained struggle throughout the closing stages.

After a two and a half month break, Hernando returned in September for the Prix Niel (a trial race for the Prix de l'Arc de Triomphe). Starting the 2/5 favourite he took the lead 300 metres from the finish and won by one and a half lengths from Dernier Empereur with the filly Dancienne in third place. On 3 October, Hernando started the 3.7/1 favourite for the Prix de l'Arc de Triomphe on heavy ground but never looked likely to win and finished sixteenth of the twenty-three runners behind Urban Sea. In November, Hernando was sent to California to contest the Breeders' Cup Turf at Santa Anita Park and finished unplaced behind Kotashaan.

=== 1994: four-year-old season ===
Hernando did not appear as a four-year-old until 20 August, when he contested the Prix Gontaut-Biron over 2000 metres at Deauville Racecourse. Starting at odds of 2.6/1, he was last of the twelve runners entering the straight but produced a strong late run to take the lead 100 metres from the finish. He won by a length from Triarius, with the British challengers Beneficial (King Edward VII Stakes) and Blush Rambler in third and fourth ahead of the favourite Richard of York. Hernando started 7/10 favourite for the Prix Foy in September, but after being denied a clear run in the straight he finished fourth of the five runners behind Richard of York, Intrepidity and Apple Tree. On 2 October, Hernando contested the Prix de l'Arc de Triomphe for the second time and started at odds of 6.7/1 in a twenty-runner field. After racing in mid-division for most of the race Hernando moved up to challenge the leaders in the straight. In a blanket finish, he finished second, a short neck behind the winner Carnegie and just ahead of Apple Tree, Ezzoud and Bright Moon. Amussen's ride was criticised with the Racing Post's Ian Taylor later writing that he had managed to "snatch defeat from the jaws of victory". In his two remaining races of 1994, Hernando finished sixth behind Tikkanen in the Breeders' Cup Turf and fourth to Marvelous Crown in the Japan Cup.

=== 1995: five-year-old season ===
After Boutin's death in February 1995 Hernando was moved to the stable of John Hammond. Hernando began his five-year-old season in May 1995 when he started favourite for the Prix Ganay but finished only fifth of the ten runners behind Pelder, Alderbrook, Richard of York and Freedom Cry. After a three and a half month break, Hernando returned and attempted to repeat his 1994 success in the Prix Gontaut-Biron and started the 1.3/1 favourite ahead of Freedom Cry, Millkom (Grand Prix de Paris), Marildo (Prix Ganay), Solid Illusion (runner-up in the Prix du Jockey Club) and Erin Bird (Premio Regina Elena). After racing in seventh place, Hernando made rapid progress in the straight, took the lead 200 metres from the finish and won by one and a half lengths and a length from Freedom Cry and Millkom. In September, Hernando was sent to Ireland for the Irish Champion Stakes at Leopardstown Racecourse, but failed to reproduce his best form, finishing seventh of the eight runners behind Pentire. In October, Hernando was sent to the United States where he finished second to Turk Passer in the Turf Classic Invitational at Belmont Park and fifth behind Northern Spur in the Breeders' Cup Turf at the same track three weeks later. On his final racecourse appearance, Hernando was sent to Tokyo Racecourse for a second attempt at the Japan Cup. Held up towards the rear of the field in the early stages, he made steady progress in the straight to finish third behind the German horse Lando and the locally trained filly Hishi Amazon.

== Stud record ==
At the end of his racing career, Hernando was retired to become a breeding stallion at the Lanwades Stud in Newmarket. He sired numerous major winners including Sulamani, Look Here, Gitano Hernando (Singapore Airlines International Cup), Casual Conquest (Tattersalls Gold Cup) and Holding Court (Prix du Jockey Club) He was also a successful sire of National Hunt horses including State Of Play (Hennessy Gold Cup), Sacundai (Aintree Hurdle), Cape Tribulation (Cotswold Chase), Conquisto (Old Roan Chase) and No Refuge (RSA Chase). He was retired from stud duty in 2011 and died of a heart attack in February 2013. The stud's owner Kirsten Rausing described Hernando as "a most charming character, always kind and co-operative, and he is very sadly missed by us all at Lanwades". Hernando was buried at Lanwades alongside his fellow stallion Selkirk who had died a month earlier.

== Pedigree ==
Pedigree of Hernando (FR), bay stallion, 1990
Sire Niniski (USA) 1976	Nijinsky (CAN); 1967	Northern Dancer	Nearctic
Sire Niniski (USA) 1976	Nijinsky (CAN); 1967	Northern Dancer	Natalma
Sire Niniski (USA) 1976	Nijinsky (CAN); 1967	Flaming Page	Bull Page
Sire Niniski (USA) 1976	Nijinsky (CAN); 1967	Flaming Page	Flaring Top
Sire Niniski (USA) 1976	Virginia Hills (USA); 1971	Tom Rolfe	Ribot
Sire Niniski (USA) 1976	Virginia Hills (USA); 1971	Tom Rolfe	Pocahontas
Sire Niniski (USA) 1976	Virginia Hills (USA); 1971	Ridin' Easy	Ridan
Sire Niniski (USA) 1976	Virginia Hills (USA); 1971	Ridin' Easy	Easy Eight
Dam Whakilyric (USA) 1984	Miswaki (USA); 1978	Mr. Prospector	Raise a Native
Dam Whakilyric (USA) 1984	Miswaki (USA); 1978	Mr. Prospector	Gold Digger
Dam Whakilyric (USA) 1984	Miswaki (USA); 1978	Hopespringseternal	Buckpasser
Dam Whakilyric (USA) 1984	Miswaki (USA); 1978	Hopespringseternal	Rose Bower
Dam Whakilyric (USA) 1984	Lyrism (USA); 1979	Lyphard	Northern Dancer
Dam Whakilyric (USA) 1984	Lyrism (USA); 1979	Lyphard	Goofed
Dam Whakilyric (USA) 1984	Lyrism (USA); 1979	Pass A Glance	Buckpasser
Dam Whakilyric (USA) 1984	Lyrism (USA); 1979	Pass A Glance	Come Hither Look (Family:13-b)

- Hernando was inbred 3 × 4 to Northern Dancer, meaning that this stallion appeared in both the third and fourth generations of his pedigree. He was also inbred 4 × 4 to Buckpasser.
