= Only Royale =

Irish-bred Thoroughbred racehorse

- Sire: Caerleon
- Grandsire: Nijinsky
- Dam: Etoile de Paris
- Damsire: Crowned Prince
- Sex: Mare
- Foaled: 17 April 1989
- Country: Ireland
- Colour: Bay
- Breeder: Barronstown Stud
- Owner: Giuseppe Sainaghi; Frank Stronach
- Trainer: Luca Cumani
- Record: 21: 9-5-1
- Earnings: £408,728

Major wins
- Yorkshire Oaks (1993, 1994); Prix Foy (1993); Jockey Club Stakes (1995)

Only Royale (foaled 1989) was an Irish-bred, British-trained Thoroughbred racehorse and broodmare. Unraced as a two-year-old, she won three times in England and twice in Italy in 1992. In the following year she was moved into the highest class and defeated the 1992 European Horse of the Year User Friendly in the Yorkshire Oaks before winning the Prix Foy in France. Only Royale won a second Yorkshire Oaks in 1994 and the Jockey Club Stakes as a six-year-old in 1995. She was also placed in the Nassau Stakes and the Coronation Cup and was unlucky in running when twice finishing just behind the leaders in the Prix de l'Arc de Triomphe. She was retired to stud at the end of 1995 and had limited success as a broodmare.

== Background ==
Only Royale was a bay mare with no white markings bred by the County Wicklow-based Barronstown Stud. Her sire, Caerleon, won the Prix du Jockey Club and the Benson & Hedges Gold Cup in 1983 and went on to become an "excellent" stallion, siring the winners of more than 700 races including Generous, Marienbard, Moonax and Warrsan. Her dam, Etoile de Paris won the Athasi Stakes as a three-year-old in 1980. As a descendant of the broodmare Miss France, Etoile de Paris came from the same branch of Thoroughbred Family 9-e which produced In The Wings, Dubawi, High-Rise and Virginia Waters. Only Royale was acquired by Giuseppe Sainaghi and sent into training with Luca Cumani at his Bedford Lodge stable in Newmarket, Suffolk.

== Racing career ==
=== 1992: three-year-old season ===
Only Royale did not race as a two-year-old and made her debut in a maiden race over one mile at Musselburgh Racecourse on 30 May. She was made the 1/3 favourite and won by two and a half lengths from Indian Style. In June and July she carried top weight of 133 pounds in two ten furlong handicap races at Newbury Racecourse and won on both occasions.

In September, the filly was sent to San Siro Racecourse in Milan where she won the Premio Mottalciata, beating two locally trained fillies over 2000 metres. Only Royale returned to England for a ten furlong handicap at Ascot Racecourse. She started 7/4 favourite, but sustained her first defeat as she finished second to Plan Ahead, to whom she was conceding 22 pounds. On her final appearance of the season, Only Royale was sent back to Italy for the Premio Giovanni Falck, a Listed race over 2,400 metres. Ridden by Frankie Dettori, she took the lead 200 metres from the finish and drew clear of her opponents to win by five lengths.

=== 1993: four-year-old season ===
On her first appearance as a four-year-old, Only Royale contested a Listed race at Leicester Racecourse on 5 June. She was beaten a short head at level weights by Sonus, a colt who had finished second to User Friendly in the 1992 St Leger Stakes. In July she was moved up to Group race class for the first time, finishing second by a neck to River North in the Scottish Classic at Ayr Racecourse and second to Lyphard's Delta in the Nassau Stakes. On 18 August, Only Royale was one of eight fillies and mares to contest the Group One Yorkshire Oaks over one and a half miles at York Racecourse. She was ridden by Ray Cochrane and started at odds of 10/1 in a field which included User Friendly, Rainbow Lake (winner of the Lancashire Oaks) and Oakmead (third in the Oaks Stakes). Only Royale was restrained by Cochrane in the early stages before moving forward in the straight. She took the lead two furlongs from the finish and went clear of her opponents to win by three and a half lengths from Dancing Bloom.

Three weeks after her win at York, Only Royale was sent to France for the Prix Foy, an important trial race for the Prix de l'Arc de Triomphe over 2400 metres at Longchamp Racecourse. taring the odds-on favourite, she took the lead 200 metres from the finish and won by a length from Modhish. On 3 October Only Royale started at odds of 19/1 in a field of twenty-three runners for the Prix de l'Arc de Triomphe. She appeared to be making good progress in the straight when she was badly hampered and despite running on again in the closing stages she finished fifth, two and a half lengths behind the winner Urban Sea. Two weeks later, Only Royale ended her season in Milan, where she finished a disappointing fourth behind Misil in the Gran Premio del Jockey Club.

=== 1994: five-year-old season ===
Only Royale began her third season of racing by finishing eighth behind Alderbrook when 5/2 favourite for the Festival Stakes at Goodwood Racecourse on 19 May. In June she started a 20/1 outsider for a strong edition of the Coronation Cup at Epsom Downs Racecourse. She finished seventh behind Apple Tree in a field which included Urban Sea, Intrepidity, Monsun, White Muzzle and Environment Friend. After a break of two and a half months Only Royale attempted to become the first horse to win consecutive runnings of the Yorkshire Oaks. Ridden by Frankie Dettori she started at odds of 15/2 against a field which included Bolas (winner of the Irish Oaks), Hawajiss (Nassau Stakes) and Wandesta (Santa Ana Stakes). Only Royale was last of the seven runners in the early stages but moved to take the lead a furlong and half from the finish. She then accelerated clear of the field to win in "impressive" style by six lengths from Dancing Bloom. Her victory made her the first horse to win the race twice.

In October, Only Royale contested her second Prix de l'Arc de Triomphe in which she was ridden by Dettori and started at odds of 13/2. For the second year in succession, she failed to obtain a clear run in the straight and finished seventh, two and a half lengths behind the winner Carnegie. After her run in the Arc, Only Royale was sold for $1m to the Canadian businessman Frank Stronach. For her last race of the season, the mare was sent to the United States for the Breeders' Cup Turf at Churchill Downs. She started a 27/1 outsider and finished fifth behind the French-trained three-year-old Tikkanen after a "bumpy trip".

=== 1993: six-year-old season ===
The first race of Only Royale's final season saw her matched against Tikkanen at weight-for-age in the Group Two Jockey Club Stakes at Newmarket Racecourse. The mare was held up by Dettori in the early stages by Dettori before overtaking the Breeders' Cup winner a furlong from the finish and winning by a neck. In June, Only Royale contested her second Coronation Cup in which he finished strongly but failed by a head to catch the French colt Sunshack. The unplaced horses included Tikkanen, Carnegie and Environment Friend. On her final appearance on 2 July, Only Royale finished third behind Carnegie and Luso in the Grand Prix de Saint-Cloud, with Tikkanen and Sunshack in fourth and fifth.

== Stud record ==
At the end of her racing career, Only Royale was sent to North America to become a broodmare at Stronach's stud. In 1996 Stronach sold her for $1.2 million. Her record has not been impressive, but she has produced two winners:

- Sir Royal (bay gelding, foaled 2005, sired by Diesis) won a handicap race at Thirsk Racecourse in 2010.
- Caster Sugar (bay mare, 2006 by Cozzene) won four handicap races in 2009.

Her daughter Royal Successor is however, the dam of the Melbourne Cup winner Prince of Penzance.

== Pedigree ==
Pedigree of Only Royale (IRE), bay mare, 1989
| Sire Caerleon (USA) 1980 | Nijinsky (CAN); 1967 | Northern Dancer | Nearctic |
| Sire Caerleon (USA) 1980 | Nijinsky (CAN); 1967 | Northern Dancer | Natalma |
| Sire Caerleon (USA) 1980 | Nijinsky (CAN); 1967 | Flaming Page | Bull Page |
| Sire Caerleon (USA) 1980 | Nijinsky (CAN); 1967 | Flaming Page | Flaring Top |
| Sire Caerleon (USA) 1980 | Foreseer (USA); 1969 | Round Table | Princequillo |
| Sire Caerleon (USA) 1980 | Foreseer (USA); 1969 | Round Table | Knight's Daughter |
| Sire Caerleon (USA) 1980 | Foreseer (USA); 1969 | Regal Gleam | Hail To Reason |
| Sire Caerleon (USA) 1980 | Foreseer (USA); 1969 | Regal Gleam | Miz Carol |
| Dam Etoile de Paris (IRE) 1977 | Crowned Prince (USA); 1969 | Raise a Native | Native Dancer |
| Dam Etoile de Paris (IRE) 1977 | Crowned Prince (USA); 1969 | Raise a Native | Raise You |
| Dam Etoile de Paris (IRE) 1977 | Crowned Prince (USA); 1969 | Gay Hostess | Royal Charger |
| Dam Etoile de Paris (IRE) 1977 | Crowned Prince (USA); 1969 | Gay Hostess | Your Hostess |
| Dam Etoile de Paris (IRE) 1977 | Place d'Etoile (GB); 1967 | Kythnos | Nearula |
| Dam Etoile de Paris (IRE) 1977 | Place d'Etoile (GB); 1967 | Kythnos | Capital Issue |
| Dam Etoile de Paris (IRE) 1977 | Place d'Etoile (GB); 1967 | Etoile de France | Arctic Star |
| Dam Etoile de Paris (IRE) 1977 | Place d'Etoile (GB); 1967 | Etoile de France | Miss France (Family: 9-e) |
