= Bikala =

Irish-bred Thoroughbred racehorse

- Sire: Kalamoun
- Grandsire: Zeddaan
- Dam: Irish Bird
- Damsire: Sea Bird
- Sex: Stallion
- Foaled: 12 March 1978
- Country: Ireland
- Colour: Bay
- Breeder: Moyglare Stud
- Owner: Jules Ouaki
- Trainer: Patrick Biancone
- Record: 13: 3-5-0

Major wins
- Prix du Jockey Club (1981); Prix Ganay (1982)

Awards
- Timeform rating: 134 (1981), 129 (1982); Top-rated French three-year-old (1981)

Bikala (12 March 1978 – 25 December 1994) was an Irish-bred, French-trained Thoroughbred racehorse and sire. Having been bought very cheaply as a yearling he developed into a top-class middle-distance performer and was rated among the best horses in Europe at three and four years of age. He won the Prix du Jockey Club in 1981 and Prix Ganay in 1982 as well as finishing second in the Prix de l'Arc de Triomphe and the Grand Prix de Saint-Cloud. He was retired to stud at the end of 1982 and had some success as a sire of winners.

== Background ==
Bikala was, a big, strong bay horse with a narrow white stripe, bred in Ireland. He was sired by Kalamoun, who won the Poule d'Essai des Poulains, Prix Lupin the Prix Jacques Le Marois in 1973 before becoming a successful breeding stallion. The best of his other runners was probably Kalaglow, Bikala's contemporary and racecourse rival. Bikala's dam Irish Bird, was a half-sister of Irish Ball, a colt who finished third in the Epsom Derby before winning the Irish Derby in 1971. A year after foaling Bikala, Irish Bird produced Assert, who won both the Prix du Jockey-Club and Irish Derby in 1982. Another of her foals was Eurobird, a filly who won the Irish St. Leger.

As a yearling Bikala was sent to the Goff's Sale but attracted very little interest and was bought for 6,000 guineas by the bloodstock agency Horse France. The colt passed into the ownership of Jules Ouaki and was sent to France to be trained by Patrick Biancone. He was ridden in most of his races by Serge Gorli, a teenager who was forced into retirement by weight problems in 1984.

== Racing career ==
=== 1980: two-year-old season ===
Bikala ran twice in the late autumn of 1980 and showed some promise. Racing on very soft ground he finished unplaced over 1800 metres on his debut and then ran fourth in a race over 1400m.

=== 1981: three-year-old season ===
Bikala began his three-year-old season by finishing second to No Lute in a minor race over 2000m at Saint-Cloud Racecourse in April. Later that month he recorded his first success with a half length win in a 1840m Handicap at Longchamp Racecourse. On 17 May he was moved up in class to contest the Group One Prix Lupin over 2100m at the same course. Ridden by Serge Gorli, he started an 18/1 outsider and finished fourth of the nine runners behind No Lute, The Wonder and Dunphy.

On 7 June, his trainer's 29th birthday, Bikala started at odds of 17/1 in the Prix du Jockey Club over 2400m at Chantilly Racecourse. Gorli tracked the pacemaker Magnum before moving into the lead on the turn into the straight. He went clear of the field and was never seriously challenged, winning by four lengths from Akarad, with the unplaced horses including No Lute, The Wonder and Nijinsky's Secret. A month later, Bikala was matched against older horses for the first time in the Grand Prix de Saint-Cloud over 2500m. As at Chantilly, he went to the front but on this occasion Akarad proved his superior and won by two and a half lengths. Bikala held on to second place ahead of Lancastrian, April Run, Gold River and Argument.

After a two-month break, Bikala returned in the Prix du Prince d'Orange, a trial race for the Prix de l'Arc de Triomphe, over 2000m at Longchamp in September. The race attracted a great deal of attention as it also saw the reappearance of Storm Bird, the leading European two-year-old of 1980, who had been off the course for eleven months. Bikala proved too good for Storm Bird, overtaking the Irish-trained colt early in the straight, but in a closely contested finish he was beaten half a length by Vayrann, to whom he was conceding two pounds. On 4 October Bikala started at odds of 14/1 in a field of twenty-four runners for the Prix de l'Arc de Triomphe. Akarad started favourite, while the other runners included Detroit (winner of the race in 1980), Ardross, Blue Wind (Oaks Stakes), Cut Above, Lancastrian, Argument, April Run, Perrault, Beldale Flutter, King's Lake and Ring the Bell. Gorli sent Bikala to the front from the start and set a steady pace before accelerating on the approach to the straight. Many of the leading contenders were soon struggling an Bikala maintained his lead until the last 100m when he was caught and beaten three-quarters of a length by the 53/1 outsider Gold River.

=== 1982: four-year-old season ===
On his four-year-old debut Bikala started the 8/5 favourite for the Group One Prix Ganay over 2100m in April. He led from the start and won by half a length from Lancastrian, with Al Nasr, Vayrann, Kalaglow and April Run among the beaten horses. In July he was sent overseas for the first time when he contested the King George VI and Queen Elizabeth Stakes over one and a half miles on firm ground at Ascot Racecourse. He started second favourite behind his half-brother Assert, with Kalaglow, Glint of Gold and Height of Fashion being the other fancied runners. Bikala again attempted to make all the running but was overtaken by Assert on the turn into the straight and faded in the closing stages to finish fifth behind Kalaglow.

As in 1981, Bikala prepared for the Arc de Triomphe by running in the Prix du Prince d'Orange and again finished second, this time being beaten by the three-year-old General Holme. In the Arc he disputed the lead with the Prix Niel winner Bon Sang until early in the straight, but then dropped away quickly and finished twelfth of the seventeen runners behind Akiyda.

== Assessment ==
In the official International Classification for 1981, Bikala was the second-highest rated three-year-old colt in Europe behind the British-trained Shergar and the third highest-rated horse of any age. The independent Timeform organisation gave him a rating of 134, placing him third behind Shergar (140) and Northjet (136). In the following year he was rated 129 by Timeform, while the International Classification made him the third-best older horse in Europe behind Kalaglow and Ardross.

== Stud record ==
Bikala was retired from racing to become a breeding stallion at the Haras du Val Henry near Tortisambert, Calvados. The best of his offspring was Apple Tree a highly successful international middle-distance performer whose wins included the Europa-Preis, Turf Classic, Grand Prix de Saint-Cloud and Coronation Cup. He also sired Polytain (Prix du Jockey Club), Grey Jack (Gran Premio Merano) and Bimbola (Prix de Pomone).

== Pedigree ==
Pedigree of Bikala (IRE), bay stallion, 1978
Sire Kalamoun (GB) 1970	Zeddaan (GB); 1965	Grey Sovereign	Nasrullah
Sire Kalamoun (GB) 1970	Zeddaan (GB); 1965	Grey Sovereign	Kong
Sire Kalamoun (GB) 1970	Zeddaan (GB); 1965	Vareta	Vilmorin
Sire Kalamoun (GB) 1970	Zeddaan (GB); 1965	Vareta	Veronique
Sire Kalamoun (GB) 1970	Khairunissa (GB); 1960	Prince Bio	Prince Rose
Sire Kalamoun (GB) 1970	Khairunissa (GB); 1960	Prince Bio	Biologie
Sire Kalamoun (GB) 1970	Khairunissa (GB); 1960	Palariva	Palestine
Sire Kalamoun (GB) 1970	Khairunissa (GB); 1960	Palariva	Rivaz
Dam Irish Bird (USA) 1970	Sea Bird (FR); 1962	Dan Cupid	Native Dancer
Dam Irish Bird (USA) 1970	Sea Bird (FR); 1962	Dan Cupid	Vixenette
Dam Irish Bird (USA) 1970	Sea Bird (FR); 1962	Sicalade	Sicambre
Dam Irish Bird (USA) 1970	Sea Bird (FR); 1962	Sicalade	Marmelade
Dam Irish Bird (USA) 1970	Irish Lass (GB); 1962	Sayajirao	Nearco
Dam Irish Bird (USA) 1970	Irish Lass (GB); 1962	Sayajirao	Rosy Legend
Dam Irish Bird (USA) 1970	Irish Lass (GB); 1962	Scollata	Niccolo Dellarca
Dam Irish Bird (USA) 1970	Irish Lass (GB); 1962	Scollata	Cutaway (family: 8-c)
