= Polytain =

French-bred Thoroughbred racehorse

- Sire: Bikala
- Grandsire: Kalamoun
- Dam: Paulistana
- Damsire: Pretense
- Sex: Stallion
- Foaled: 22 April 1989
- Country: France
- Colour: Chestnut
- Breeder: Jean-Luc Lagardère
- Owner: Mme Bruno Houillion
- Trainer: Antonio Spanu
- Record: 13: 3-1-2
- Earnings: £292,521

Major wins
- Prix du Jockey Club (1992)

Polytain (22 April 1989 – after 2000) was a French Thoroughbred racehorse and sire. Unraced as a juvenile, he won his first two races and then finished third before finishing third in the Prix La Force and then recording an upset win in the Prix du Jockey Club. His subsequent form was disappointing as he failed to win in his remaining nine races. He made no impact as a breeding stallion.

== Background ==
Polytain was a chestnut horse bred in France by Jean-Luc Lagardère. He was sired by Bikala, who won the Prix du Jockey Club in 1981 and the Prix Ganay in 1982. The best of his offspring was probably Apple Tree whose wins included the Europa-Preis, Turf Classic, Grand Prix de Saint-Cloud and Coronation Cup. Polytain's dam Paulistana was sired by the Santa Anita Handicap winner Pretense and was a granddaughter of Tempted.

During his racing career, Polytain was owned by Mme Bruno Houillion and trained by Antonio Spanu.

== Racing career ==
=== 1992: three-year-old season ===
Polytain began his racing career in the Prix de Crespieres over 1800 metres Maisons-Laffitte Racecourse on 30 March 1992. Ridden for the only time by Freddy Head, he won by four lengths from Triple Trouble on soft ground. Fifteen days later, ridden by the apprentice jockey Stephane Coerette, he won the Prix Aveu over 2100 metres at Saint-Cloud Racecourse, beating Acaste and Indian Flight by a neck and a length. William Mongil took the ride when Polytain was moved up in class to contest the Group Three Prix La Force over 2000 metres at Longchamp Racecourse on 21 May. He turned into the straight in sixth and made steady progress in the straight to finish third, beaten half a length and a neck by the favourite Break Bread and Standiford,

Despite his defeat at Longchamp Polytain was again stepped up in class for the 155th running of the Prix du Jockey Club over 2400 Metres at Chantilly Racecourse on 7 June in which he was ridden or the first time by Frankie Dettori and started a 36.5/1 outsider. His sixteen opponents included Break Bread, Johann Quatz (winner of the Prix Lupin) Apple Tree (Prix Greffulhe), Adieu au Roi (Prix Hocquart), Grand Plaisir (Prix Noailles), Silver Kite (Prix Yacowlef), and Jape (Premio Guido Berardelli). Dettori restrained the colt in the early stages and reached the final turn in twelfth place. He made steady progress in the straight, caught the André Fabre-trained Modhish approaching the last 200 metres and was driven clear to win by one and a half lengths. Marignan finished second ahead of Contested Bid, Johann Quatz and Modhish.

After a three-month break, Polytain returned in September for the Prix Niel over 2400 metres at Longchamp. Ridden again by Dettori he started the 6/4 favourite but never looked likely to in and finished last of the eight runners behind Songlines. On 4 October, the colt contested France's most prestigious race, the Prix de l'Arc de Triomphe, but made no impact, finishing tailed-off last of the eighteen runners behind Subotica.

=== 1993: four-year-old season ===
Polytain remained in training as a four-year-old, but failed to win in seven races. He started promisingly when finishing third, beaten a head and a neck by Marildo and Dear Doctor in the Prix d'Harcourt at Longchamp in April, but then ran sixth of the eight runners behind Vert Amande in the Prix Ganay. The colt then finished unplaced in the Grand Prix d'Evry, the Grand Prix de Saint-Cloud and the Grand Prix de Vichy. In late autumn, the colt was dropped in class for the Listed Prix Niceas at Maisons-Laffitte and was beaten a nose by the Irish-trained Portico. On his final racecourse appearance, Polytain finished sixth in the Listed Prix Edellic at Saint-Cloud on 13 December.

== Stud record ==
Polytain was retired to stud at the end of the 1993 season. By 1998, he was standing at Besnate, near Varese in Italy, He was not a success as a breeding stallion, siring a few minor winners of French steeplechases. His last reported foal was born in 2001.

== Pedigree ==
Pedigree of Polytain (FR), chestnut stallion, 1989
Sire Bikala (IRE) 1978	Kalamoun (GB); 1970	Zeddaan	Grey Sovereign
Sire Bikala (IRE) 1978	Kalamoun (GB); 1970	Zeddaan	Vareta
Sire Bikala (IRE) 1978	Kalamoun (GB); 1970	Khairunissa	Prince Bio
Sire Bikala (IRE) 1978	Kalamoun (GB); 1970	Khairunissa	Palariva
Sire Bikala (IRE) 1978	Irish Bird (USA); 1970	Sea-Bird	Dan Cupid
Sire Bikala (IRE) 1978	Irish Bird (USA); 1970	Sea-Bird	Sicalade
Sire Bikala (IRE) 1978	Irish Bird (USA); 1970	Irish Lass	Sayajirao
Sire Bikala (IRE) 1978	Irish Bird (USA); 1970	Irish Lass	Scollata
Dam Paulistana (USA) 1980	Pretense (USA); 1963	Endeavour	British Empire
Dam Paulistana (USA) 1980	Pretense (USA); 1963	Endeavour	Himalaya
Dam Paulistana (USA) 1980	Pretense (USA); 1963	Imitation	Hyperion
Dam Paulistana (USA) 1980	Pretense (USA); 1963	Imitation	Flattery
Dam Paulistana (USA) 1980	Near Me Now (USA); 1969	Nearctic	Nearco
Dam Paulistana (USA) 1980	Near Me Now (USA); 1969	Nearctic	Lady Angela
Dam Paulistana (USA) 1980	Near Me Now (USA); 1969	Tempted	Half Crown
Dam Paulistana (USA) 1980	Near Me Now (USA); 1969	Tempted	Enchanted Eve (Family:4-r)
