= Intrepidity =

British-bred Thoroughbred racehorse

- Racing colours of Sheikh Mohammed
- Sire: Sadler's Wells
- Grandsire: Northern Dancer
- Dam: Intrepid Lady
- Damsire: Bold Ruler
- Sex: Mare
- Foaled: 19 February 1990
- Country: United Kingdom
- Colour: Dark bay or brown
- Breeder: M Ryan
- Owner: Sheikh Mohammed
- Trainer: André Fabre
- Record: 12: 4-2-0
- Earnings: £517,589

Major wins
- Prix Saint-Alary (1993); Epsom Oaks (1993); Prix Vermeille (1993)

Honours
- European Champion Three-year-old Filly (1993); Timeform rating: 124

Intrepidity (foaled 19 February 1990) was a British-bred, French-trained Thoroughbred racehorse. In a racing career which lasted from April 1993 to November 1994 the filly ran twelve times and won four races. Unraced as a two-year-old, Intrepidity proved to be the outstanding three-year-old filly in Europe in 1993, winning the Prix Saint-Alary and the Prix Vermeille in France and The Oaks in England. She also finished fourth in the Prix de l'Arc de Triomphe, beaten one and a half lengths. At the end of the year she was voted European Champion Three-year-old Filly at the Cartier Racing Awards. Intrepidity was kept in training as a four-year-old, but failed to win, although she finished second in the Prix Ganay and the Prix Foy. She was then retired to stud where her record as a broodmare was disappointing.

== Background ==
Intrepidity was a dark bay mare with a white star and two white feet bred in Britain by M. Ryan. She was sired by the thirteen time Champion sire Sadler's Wells. Intrepidity's dam, Intrepid Lady, was an American-bred daughter of Bold Ruler, and closely related on her dam's side to Bold Bidder. Apart from Intrepidity, Intrepid Lady's best foal was Acushla, a filly who twice won the Phoenix Sprint Stakes.

Intrepidity was sent into training with André Fabre at Chantilly.

== Racing career ==
=== 1993: three-year-old season ===
Intrepidity began her racing career in the Prix Finlande, Listed race run over 1800 metres in April at Longchamp Racecourse in Paris. Ridden by Thierry Jarnet, she won by half a length from Alice Springs. The form of the race was boosted when the third horse, Madeleine's Dream, won the Group One Poule d'Essai des Pouliches on 16 May. A week later, Intrepidity was promoted to Group One class for the 2000m Prix Saint-Alary. Starting the 4/5 favourite, the filly took the lead in the straight and went clear of her opponents before being eased down by Jarnet to win by a length from Dancienne.

Michael Roberts took over from Jarnet when the filly was sent to England to contest the Oaks on 5 June. In a field of fourteen fillies, Intrepidity started 5/1 second favourite, behind the Barry Hills-trained Yawl (4/1) and just ahead of her stable companion Wemyss Bight. Intrepidity stumbled early in the race as she struggled to cope with the demanding course (according to Richard Edmondson in The Independent she resembled "Bambi on roller-skates") and was among the back-markers until the runners entered the straight. Switched to the outside, Intrepidity made rapid progress to take the lead inside the final furlong and win comfortably by three-quarters of a length from Royal Ballerina and Oakmead, with Wemyss Bight seven lengths back in fifth. The winning time of 2:34.19 set a new record for the race which still stands (as of 2012). Roberts, who had never sat on Intrepidity before riding her in the race, claimed that he had never been worried, saying that "once I got her running I knew I was going to win". Fabre called her "a top-class filly" and indicated that she would probably be rested until autumn. A month after her win at Epsom, the still-unbeaten Intrepidity started 11/10 favourite for the Irish Oaks at the Curragh, after her connections abandoned plans to run her against colts in the Irish Derby. Sheikh Mohammed had to pay a supplementary fee of £25,000 to run her in the race, as she had not been among the original entries. Racing on much softer ground she appeared outpaced in the closing stages and finished fourth behind Wemyss Bight, Royal Ballerina and Oakmead.

Intrepidity and Wemyss Bight met for the third time in the Prix Vermeille at Longchamp in September, with Wemyss Bight starting favourite. Ridden once again by Thierry Jarnet, Intrepidity came from well back in the field to take the lead in the straight and held the late challenge of Wemyss Bight (who appeared to be an unlucky loser) to win by a head. Intrepidity and Opera House made up Sheikh Mohammed's entry for the Prix de l'Arc de Triomphe at Longchamp in October, and the pair were made 3.9/1 second favourite behind the Prix du Jockey Club winner Hernando (in France, horses in the same ownership are grouped together for betting purposes). Jarnet held the filly at the back of the twenty-three runner field before switching to the wide outside in the straight. Intrepidity overtook most of the runners in the final 200m but was unable to catch the leaders and was a fast-finishing fourth behind Urban Sea, White Muzzle and Opera House. On her final appearance of the season, Intrepidity was sent to California for the Breeders' Cup Turf at Santa Anita Park, but was never in contention and finished unplaced behind Kotashaan.

=== 1994: four-year-old season ===
Intrepidity made her four-year-old debut in the Group One Prix Ganay at Longchamp on 1 May, and started favourite against a field which included Urban Sea, Ezzoud and Bob's Return. Intrepidity was last of the eight runners entering the straight before finishing strongly to finish second to Marildo. In June, Intrepidity returned to the scene of her Oaks victory and started favourite for the Coronation Cup, but was never able to challenge the leaders and finished last of the eleven runners behind her stable companion Apple Tree. After a break of three months, Intrepidity returned in the Prix Foy at Longchamp in September. In a race in which André Fabre trained four of the five runners, she finished second to Richard of York, with Apple Tree and Hernando third and fourth. Intrepidity was part of a four-strong Sheikh Mohammed entry (with Richard of York, Carnegie and King's Theatre) which started favourite for the Prix de l'Arc de Triomphe. Intrepidity was ridden closer to the lead than usual, and turned into the straight in third place, but weakened in the closing stages and finished thirteenth of the twenty runners behind Carnegie. On her final start, Intrepidity made a second bid for the Breeders' Cup Turf and ran much better than she had in 1993. At Churchill Downs on 5 November she started a 47/1 outsider but finished strongly to take fourth place behind Tikkanen, Hatoof and Paradise Creek.

== Assessment and honours ==
The independent Timeform organisation gave Intrepidity a rating of 124.

In their book, A Century of Champions, based on the Timeform rating system, John Randall and Tony Morris rated Intrepidity an "average" winner of the Oaks.

In the Cartier Racing Awards for 1993, Intrepidity was voted European Champion Three-year-old Filly.

== Stud record ==
Intrepidity was retired to become a broodmare for Sheikh Mohammed's Darley Stud. Although she was sent to many leading stallions including Mr. Prospector, Gone West and Rainbow Quest she did not produce any top class racehorses. Her most successful runner was Deodatus, sired by Darshaan, who won several races in the United Arab Emirates.

- 1996 MUGHAMERR (GB), bay or brown filly, foaled 8 March, by Mr. Prospector (USA) – placed once from 9 starts in France and England, dam of winners in Japan
- 1997 CLASSIQUE, bay filly by Rainbow Quest (USA) – unraced
- 1998 DEODATUS (USA), bay colt, foaled 28 April, by Darshaan (GB) – won 7 races in Dubai 2001–2006
- 2001 IMPERIALISM (IRE), bay colt, foaled 22 February, by Seeking The Gold (USA) – never ran, died in 2004
- 2002 BARONIAL (GB), bay colt, foaled 7 March, by King's Best (USA) – exported to Czech Republic
- 2003 BATTLE READY (IRE), bay colt, 27 March, by Mark Of Esteem (IRE) – exported to Japan
- 2004 Bay colt by King's Best (USA)
- 2005 Barren to Dubai Destination (USA)
- 2006 Barren to Cape Cross (IRE)
- 2007 WILD GEESE (IRE), Brown gelding, foaled 28 February, by Cape Cross (IRE) – won a hurdle and 2 steeplechases and placed 11 times on the flat and under National Hunt rules 2010–2014
- 2008 Bay colt by Byron (GB)
- 2009 Barren to Dubawi (IRE)
- 2010 LONE ASCENT (IRE), grey filly by Dalakhani (IRE) – unraced
- 2011 DASTARDLY (IRE), bay colt, foaled 13 May, by Invincible Spirit (IRE) – ran 6 times in France 2014, finishing 2nd once in a minor race in the Provinces

Put out of stud in October 2011

== Pedigree ==
Pedigree of Intrepidity (GB), bay or brown mare, 1990
Sire Sadler's Wells	Northern Dancer	Nearctic	Nearco
Sire Sadler's Wells	Northern Dancer	Nearctic	Lady Angela
Sire Sadler's Wells	Northern Dancer	Natalma	Native Dancer
Sire Sadler's Wells	Northern Dancer	Natalma	Almahmoud
Sire Sadler's Wells	Fairy Bridge	Bold Reason	Hail To Reason
Sire Sadler's Wells	Fairy Bridge	Bold Reason	Lalun
Sire Sadler's Wells	Fairy Bridge	Special	Forli
Sire Sadler's Wells	Fairy Bridge	Special	Thong
Dam Intrepid Lady	Bold Ruler	Nasrullah	Nearco
Dam Intrepid Lady	Bold Ruler	Nasrullah	Mumtaz Begum
Dam Intrepid Lady	Bold Ruler	Miss Disco	Discovery
Dam Intrepid Lady	Bold Ruler	Miss Disco	Outdone
Dam Intrepid Lady	Stepping Stone	Princequillo	Prince Rose
Dam Intrepid Lady	Stepping Stone	Princequillo	Cosquilla
Dam Intrepid Lady	Stepping Stone	Step Across	Balladier
Dam Intrepid Lady	Stepping Stone	Step Across	Drawbridge (Family: 3-n)
