= Spanish Moon =

American-bred Thoroughbred racehorse

- Sire: El Prado
- Grandsire: Sadler's Wells
- Dam: Shining Bright
- Damsire: Rainbow Quest
- Sex: Horse
- Foaled: 2004
- Country: United States
- Colour: Bay
- Breeder: Juddmonte Farms
- Owner: Khalid Abdullah
- Trainer: Sir Michael Stoute
- Record: 14: 6-3-1
- Earnings: £1,479,842

Major wins
- Grand Prix de Saint-Cloud (2009); Prix Foy (2009)
- Last updated on January 8, 2009

Spanish Moon (foaled April 24, 2004) is an American-bred and British-trained Thoroughbred racehorse, owned by Khalid Abdullah. He became famous for running second in the Dubai Sheema Classic. His one group one win came in the Grand Prix de Saint-Cloud.

Due to unruly behaviour at the starting stalls he was banned from racing in the United Kingdom for six months from May 2009.
