= Environment Friend =

British-bred Thoroughbred racehorse

- Sire: Cozzene
- Grandsire: Caro
- Dam: Water Woo
- Damsire: Tom Rolfe
- Sex: Stallion
- Foaled: 19 March 1988
- Country: United Kingdom
- Colour: Grey
- Breeder: Stetchworth Park Stud
- Owner: Bill Gredley
- Trainer: James Fanshawe
- Record: 31: 3-3-3
- Earnings: £395,951

Major wins
- Dante Stakes (1991); Eclipse Stakes (1991)

Environment Friend (19 March 1988 – 28 February 2012) was a British Thoroughbred racehorse and sire best known for his win in the 1991 running of the Eclipse Stakes, one of the United Kingdom's most important weight-for-age races. After winning the second of his races as a two-year-old he established himself as a top-class colt with a five length win in the Dante Stakes in May 1991. He ran poorly in The Derby but then defeated a strong field to win the Eclipse as a 28/1 outsider. Environment Friend never won again, but remained in training until the age of seven, and was placed in several important races including the Coronation Cup (twice), the Champion Stakes and the Irish Champion Stakes. From 1993 until 1995 his time was divided between standing as a breeding stallion and competing as a racehorse.

== Background ==
Environment Friend was a grey horse bred by his owner, Bill Gredley, at his Stetchworth Park Stud near Newmarket, Suffolk. He was sired by the American stallion Cozzene, the winner of ten races including the Breeders' Cup Mile and the sire of several other major winners including Tikkanen, Alphabet Soup, Star of Cozzene and Star Over the Bay. Environment Friend's dam Water Woo was a Kentucky-bred daughter of the 1000 Guineas winner Waterloo. As a yearling, Environment Friend was sent to the sales but was "bought back" by his breeder for 18,000 guineas. Gredley sent the colt into training with James Fanshawe at the Pegasus House stable in Newmarket. In his first three seasons Environment Friend was usually ridden by George Duffield.

== Racing career ==
=== 1990: two-year-old season ===
Environment Friend began his racing career in a seven furlong maiden race at Sandown Park Racecourse on 19 September in which he finished sixth of the sixteen runners behind the Barry Hills-trained Surrealist. On 4 October he started 7/2 joint-favourite in a field of eighteen runners for the Westley Maiden Stakes at Newmarket Racecourse. He made progress in the last quarter mile, took the lead inside the final furlong and won by half a length from Fly To The Moon.

=== 1991: three-year-old season ===
In the early part of his three-year-old season, Environment Friend was aimed at the British Classic Races. He began in the Easter Stakes, a trial race for the 2000 Guineas, run at Kempton Park Racecourse on 30 March. Ridden by Walter Swinburn he started the 3/1 third favourite of the ten runners and finished third, beaten two and a half lengths and three length by Corrupt and Selkirk. In April, the colt was ridden again by Swinburn when he contested another Guineas trial, the Group Three Craven Stakes at Newmarket. He led until the last quarter mile but was then outpaced and finished fifth behind Marju, beaten seven lengths. Environment Friend was reunited with Duffield at York Racecourse in May when he contested the Group Two Dante Stakes, a major trial race for The Derby. Starting a 20/1 outsider in a field headed by the Racing Post Trophy winner Peter Davies, the colt started lowly and was restrained at the back of the eight-runner field in the early stages. He made "smooth" progress in the straight, took the lead just over a furlong from the finish, and drew clear to win by five lengths from Hailsham, a colt who won the Derby Italiano on his next appearance.

On 5 June, Environment Friend started at odds of 11/1 in a field of thirteen runners for the 212th running of the Derby Stakes over one and a half miles at Epsom Downs Racecourse. He made no impression in the race, being always towards the rear and finishing eleventh, more than forty lengths behind the winner Generous. The colt was then matched against older horses for the first time in the Group One Eclipse Stakes over ten furlongs at Sandown. He ran at the insistence of his owner: Fanshawe had wanted to give the horse a confidence-boosting run against inferior opposition, while Duffield thought the decision to contest one of the year's most important weight-for-age races was "mad". He started at odds of 28/1 in a field of seven runners which included Marju, Terimon, In the Groove, Sanglamore and Stagecraft (winner of the Prince of Wales's Stakes). Environment Friend turned into the straight sixth place but then made progress under a hard ride from Duffield and joined the leader Stagecraft inside the last quarter mile. He gained the advantage inside the final furlong and won by a head, with a gap of seven lengths back to Sanglamore in third place. In August Environment Friend met Stagecraft again in the International Stakes at York in a field which also included the 1990 Derby winner Quest for Fame. Racing over the same course and distance as his victory in the Dante Stakes, the grey started the 3/1 second favourite but ran poorly and finished fifth of the six runners behind Terimon.

In September, Environment Friend was sent to Ireland for the Irish Champion Stakes, which was run for the first time at Leopardstown Racecourse. He was unable to mount a serious challenge to the French-trained favourite Suave Dancer but finished strongly to take second place ahead of Stagecraft. Environment Friend ended his season in the Champion Stakes at Newmarket on 19 October, when he ran poorly and finished tenth of the twelve runners behind the French colt Tel Quel.

=== 1992–1995: later career ===
Environment Friend remained in training as a four-year-old, but ran only four times and failed to win. His best run came on his final appearance when he finished third behind Rodrigo de Triano in the Champion Stakes.

From 1993, Gredley took the unusual step of standing Environment Friend as a breeding stallion in the early part of the season before returning him to training to compete as a racehorse: he later admitted that he regretted the decision. The horse produced his best performance of the season in June at Epsom when he finished third in a three-way photo-finish to the Coronation Cup, beaten a short-head and a head by Opera House and Apple Tree, but was promoted to second when the runner-up was disqualified. He finished unplaced in his other six races. In the autumn he was transferred to the stable of Richard Shaw.

Environment Friend's six-year-old campaign followed a similar pattern to that of the previous year, as he returned from stud duty to run very well in the Coronation Cup. On this occasion he finished second to Apple Tree, beaten a length, with the beaten horses including Urban Sea, White Muzzle, Monsun, Only Royale and Intrepidity. He then rejoined Fanshawe's stable and ran quite well to finish fourt to Ezzoud in the Eclipse Stakes, but finished unplaced in his last three races. At the end of the year he was moved again, this time to the stable of Gary Rimmer.

After another covering season, Environment Friend returned for five more races in 1995, his final season. His best efforts were a third to Prince of Andros in the Tattersalls Gold Cup and a fourth place behind Halling in the Eclipse. Once again, he switched trainers part-way through the season, ending his career in the care of Clive Brittain.

== Stud record ==
Environment Friend was not successful as a sire of winners. The best of his flat racers was probably Green Jewel, a mare who won the Grade III Louis R. Rowan Handicap at Santa Anita Park in 1998. In National Hunt racing he made some impact as the sire of Alfa Beat, twice winner of the Kerry National steeplechase at Listowel Racecourse. Died on 28 February 2012 at the Mellon Stud in County Limerick. The stud's owner, Frank Jarvey described him as "a lovely character... a christian of a horse."

== Pedigree ==
Pedigree of Environment Friend (GB), grey stallion, 1988
Sire Cozzene (USA) 1980	Caro (IRE); 1967	Fortino	Grey Sovereign
Sire Cozzene (USA) 1980	Caro (IRE); 1967	Fortino	Ranavalo
Sire Cozzene (USA) 1980	Caro (IRE); 1967	Chambord	Chamossaire
Sire Cozzene (USA) 1980	Caro (IRE); 1967	Chambord	Life Hill
Sire Cozzene (USA) 1980	Ride the Trails (USA); 1971	Prince John	Princequillo
Sire Cozzene (USA) 1980	Ride the Trails (USA); 1971	Prince John	Not Afraid
Sire Cozzene (USA) 1980	Ride the Trails (USA); 1971	Wildwook	Sir Gaylord
Sire Cozzene (USA) 1980	Ride the Trails (USA); 1971	Wildwook	Blue Canoe
Dam Water Woo (USA) 1976	Tom Rolfe (USA); 1962	Ribot	Tenerani
Dam Water Woo (USA) 1976	Tom Rolfe (USA); 1962	Ribot	Romanella
Dam Water Woo (USA) 1976	Tom Rolfe (USA); 1962	Pocahontas	Roman
Dam Water Woo (USA) 1976	Tom Rolfe (USA); 1962	Pocahontas	How
Dam Water Woo (USA) 1976	Waterloo (GB); 1969	Bold Lad (IRE)	Bold Ruler
Dam Water Woo (USA) 1976	Waterloo (GB); 1969	Bold Lad (IRE)	Barn Pride
Dam Water Woo (USA) 1976	Waterloo (GB); 1969	Lakewoods	Hyperion
Dam Water Woo (USA) 1976	Waterloo (GB); 1969	Lakewoods	Holwood (Family: 1-u)
