= Sulamani =

Irish-bred Thoroughbred racehorse

- Sire: Hernando
- Grandsire: Niniski
- Dam: Soul Dream
- Damsire: Alleged
- Sex: Stallion
- Foaled: 9 April 1999
- Died: February 18, 2017 (aged 17)
- Country: Ireland
- Colour: Dark Bay
- Breeder: Niarchos Family
- Owner: Niarchos Family; Godolphin Racing (2003–2010)
- Trainer: Pascal Bary; Saeed bin Suroor (2003–2004)
- Record: 17: 9-3-1
- Earnings: $5,285,753

Major wins
- Prix du Jockey Club (2002); Prix Niel (2002); Dubai Sheema Classic (2003); Arlington Million (2003); Joe Hirsch Turf Classic Invitational Handicap (2003); Juddmonte International Stakes (2004); Canadian International Stakes (2004)
- Last updated on September 7, 2007

Sulamani (April 9, 1999 – February 18, 2017) was an Irish-bred thoroughbred race horse who competed and won in Dubai, Europe and North America.

A great-grandson of English Triple Crown champion, Nijinsky, he made his racing debut in April 2002 at age three and finished seventh. Racing in France, he went on to win the prestigious Prix du Jockey Club and was second in the 2002 Prix de l'Arc de Triomphe. After his Arc placing, he was purchased by Godolphin Racing.

As a four-year-old, Sulamani won the Dubai Sheema Classic but finished fourth in the June 2003 Grand Prix de Saint-Cloud and finished second in the King George VI and Queen Elizabeth Stakes. In the United States, he won two important races, the Arlington Million on a disqualification and the Joe Hirsch Turf Classic Invitational Handicap, before finishing fifth in the 2003 Breeders' Cup Turf at Santa Anita Park.

In his final season of racing, Sulamani won the Juddmonte International Stakes at York Racecourse in England and was retired to stud after capturing the Canadian International at Woodbine Racetrack in Toronto.

Sulamani died on February 18, 2017.
