= Prix Foy =

- Class: Group 2
- Location: Longchamp Racecourse; Paris, France
- Inaugurated: 1955
- Race type: Flat / Thoroughbred
- Sponsor: Qatar
- Website: france-galop.com

Race information
- Distance: 2,400 metres (1½ miles)
- Surface: Turf
- Track: Right-handed
- Qualification: Four-years-old and up excluding geldings
- Weight: 58 kg Allowances; 1½ kg for fillies and mares
- Purse: €130,000 (2021); 1st: €74,100

Prix Foy
2026
Daryz	Bay City Roller	Uthred

Previous years
2025
Byzantine Dream	Sosie	Almaqam
2024
Iresine	Zarir	Continuous
2023
Place Du Carrousel	Iresine	Sammarco
2022
Iresine	Bubble Gift	Verry Elleegant
2021
Deep Bond	Broome	Iresine

2020-2011
2020
Anthony Van Dyck	Stradivarius	Nagano Gold
2019
Waldgeist	Way To Paris	Kiseki
2018
Waldgeist	Talismanic	Cloth Of Stars
2017
Dschingis Secret	Cloth Of Stars	Talismanic
2016
Silverwave	Ito	Elliptique
2015
Postponed	Spiritjim	Baino Hope
2014
Ruler Of The World	Flintshire	Spiritjim
2013
Orfevre	Very Nice Name	Pirika
2012
Orfevre	Meandre	Joshua Tree
2011
Sarafina	Hiruno D'Amour	St Nicholas Abbey

2010–2001
2010
Duncan	Nakayama Festa	Timos
2009
Spanish Moon	Vision D'Etat	Crossharbour
2008
Zambezi Sun	Schiaparelli	Light Green
2007
Manduro	Mandesha	Dragon Dancer
2006
Shirocco	Hurricane Run	Pride
2005
Pride	Alkaased	Shirocco
2004
Policy Maker	Short Pause	Nysaean
2003
Ange Gabriel	Martaline	Imperial Dancer
2002
Aquarelliste	Anabaa Blue	Falbrav
2001
Hightori	Idaho Quest	Slew The Red

2000-1991
2000
Montjeu	Crillon	Commander Collins
1999
El Condor Pasa	Borgia	Croco Rouge
1998
Limnos	Fragrant Mix	Oa Baldixe
1997
Yokohama	Nothin' Leica Dane	Le Destin
1996
Swain	Pentire	Leeds
1995
Carnegie	Balanchine	Tot Ou Tard
1994
Richard Of York	Intrepidity	Apple Tree
1993
Only Royale	Modhish	Vert Amande
1992
Magic Night	Subotica	Tel Quel
1991
Splash Of Colour	Panoramic	Echoes

1990-1988
1990
In The Wings	Zartota	Robertet
1989
Star Lift	Robore	Apache
1988
Beeshi	Luth Dancer	Village Star

The Prix Foy is a Group 2 flat horse race in France open to thoroughbred colts and fillies aged four years or older. It is run at Longchamp over a distance of 2,400 metres (about 1½ miles), and it is scheduled to take place each year in September.

The race serves as a trial for the Prix de l'Arc de Triomphe, which is held at the same venue three weeks later.

== History ==
The event is named in memory of Henri Foy (1872–1954), a long-serving member of the Société d'Encouragement, a former governing body of horse racing in France. It was established in 1955, and originally called the Prix Henri Foy.

The race was initially contested over 2,300 metres, and for a period it was open to horses aged three or older. It was cut to 2,200 metres in 1961, and the minimum age was raised to four in 1967. Its title was shortened to the Prix Foy in 1969.

The present system of race grading was introduced in 1971, and the Prix Foy was given Group 3 status. It was subsequently run on the same day as the Prix Niel, a similar event restricted to three-year-olds.

The race was extended to 2,400 metres in 1979. It was promoted to Group 2 level in 1998.

Four winners of the Prix Foy have achieved victory in the same year's Prix de l'Arc de Triomphe – Allez France (1974), Sagace (1984), Waldgeist (2019) and Daryz (2026). Three horses have won the Arc after being defeated in this event – Gold River (1981), All Along (1983) and Subotica (1992).

Prix Foy is eligible for geldings from 2020.

== Records ==
Most successful horse (2 wins):

- Allez France – 1974, 1975
- Sagace – 1984, 1985
- Orfevre – 2012, 2013
- Waldgeist – 2018, 2019

Leading jockey (9 wins):

- Yves Saint-Martin – Suffren (1960), Acer (1964), Petrone (1968), Snow Castle (1972), Allez France (1974, 1975), Sagace (1984, 1985), Mersey (1986)

Leading trainer (11 wins):

- André Fabre – Ordinance (1987), Star Lift(1989), In the Wings (1990), Richard of York (1994), Carnegie (1995), Swain (1996), Shirocco (2006), Manduro (2007), Waldgeist (2018, 2019), Place Du Carrousel (2023)

Leading owner (7 wins):

- Daniel Wildenstein – Petrone (1968), Allez France (1974, 1975), Sagace (1984, 1985), Mersey (1986), Star Lift (1989)

== Winners since 1979 ==
Year	Winner	Age	Jockey	Trainer	Owner	Time
1979	Pevero	4	Philippe Paquet	François Boutin	Gerry Oldham
1980	Le Marmot	4	Philippe Paquet	François Boutin	Rodolph Schafer	2:32.8
1981	Detroit	4	Pat Eddery	Olivier Douieb	Robert Sangster	2:40.80
1982	April Run	4	Lester Piggott	François Boutin	Diana Firestone	2:32.20
1983	Time Charter	4	Billy Newnes	Henry Candy	Robert Barnett	2:40.60
1984	Sagace	4	Yves Saint-Martin	Patrick Biancone	Daniel Wildenstein	2:38.40
1985	Sagace	5	Yves Saint-Martin	Patrick Biancone	Daniel Wildenstein	2:33.50
1986	Mersey	4	Yves Saint-Martin	Patrick Biancone	Daniel Wildenstein
1987	Ordinance	4	Pat Eddery	André Fabre	Khalid Abdullah
1988	Beeshi	4	Richard Quinn	Paul Cole	Fahd Salman	2:34.60
1989	Star Lift	5	Dominique Boeuf	André Fabre	Daniel Wildenstein	2:32.80
1990	In The Wings	4	Pat Eddery	André Fabre	Sheikh Mohammed	2:31.30
1991	Splash of Colour	4	Cash Asmussen	Nicolas Clément	Susumu Harada	2:30.10
1992	Magic Night	4	Alain Badel	Philippe Demercastel	Hideo Yokoyama	2:40.50
1993	Only Royale	4	Ray Cochrane	Luca Cumani	Giuseppe Sainaghi	2:51.60
1994	Richard of York	4	Sylvain Guillot	André Fabre	Sheikh Mohammed	2:34.60
1995	Carnegie	4	Thierry Jarnet	André Fabre	Sheikh Mohammed	2:35.60
1996	Swain	4	Thierry Jarnet	André Fabre	Sheikh Mohammed	2:31.90
1997	Yokohama	6	Olivier Doleuze	Criquette Head	Madeleine Paulson	2:31.80
1998	Limnos	4	Cash Asmussen	Dominique Sépulchre	Niarchos Family	2:42.30
1999	El Condor Pasa	4	Masayoshi Ebina	Yoshitaka Ninomiya	Takashi Watanabe	2:31.40
2000	Montjeu	4	Michael Kinane	John Hammond	Michael Tabor	2:32.80
2001	Hightori	4	Gérald Mossé	Philippe Demercastel	Gary Tanaka	2:30.10
2002	Aquarelliste	4	Dominique Boeuf	Élie Lellouche	Ecurie Wildenstein	2:29.00
2003	Ange Gabriel	5	Thierry Jarnet	Eric Libaud	Antonia Devin	2:28.60
2004	Policy Maker	4	Olivier Peslier	Élie Lellouche	Ecurie Wildenstein	2:38.70
2005	Pride	5	Christophe Lemaire	Alain de Royer-Dupré	NP Bloodstock Ltd	2:29.20
2006	Shirocco	5	Christophe Soumillon	André Fabre	Georg von Ullmann	2:32.90
2007	Manduro	5	Stéphane Pasquier	André Fabre	Georg von Ullmann	2:28.80
2008	Zambezi Sun	4	Stéphane Pasquier	Pascal Bary	Khalid Abdullah	2:28.80
2009	Spanish Moon	5	Ryan Moore	Sir Michael Stoute	Khalid Abdullah	2:28.70
2010	Duncan	5	William Buick	John Gosden	Normandie Stud Ltd	2:35.90
2011	Sarafina	4	Christophe Lemaire	Alain de Royer-Dupré	HH Aga Khan IV	2:32.28
2012	Orfevre	4	Christophe Soumillon	Yasutoshi Ikee	Sunday Racing	2:34.26
2013	Orfevre	5	Christophe Soumillon	Yasutoshi Ikee	Sunday Racing	2:41.47
2014	Ruler of the World	4	Frankie Dettori	Aidan O'Brien	Al Shaqab, Magnier, Tabor, Smith	2:26.93
2015	Postponed	4	Andrea Atzeni	Luca Cumani	Mohammed Obaid Al Maktoum	2:32.88
2016	Silverwave	4	Maxime Guyon	Pascal Bary	Hspirit	2:32.28
2017	Dschingis Secret	4	Adrie de Vries	Markus Klug	Horst Pudwill	2:35.86
2018	Waldgeist	4	Pierre-Charles Boudot	André Fabre	Gestut Ammerland & Newsells Park	2:28.70
2019	Waldgeist	5	Pierre-Charles Boudot	André Fabre	Gestut Ammerland & Newsells Park	2:27.57
2020	Anthony Van Dyck	4	Mickael Barzalona	Aidan O'Brien	Smith / Magnier / Tabor	2:33.27
2021	Deep Bond	4	Cristian Demuro	Ryuji Okubo	Shinji Maeda	2:31.82
2022	Iresine	5	Marie Vélon	Jean-Pierre Gauvin	Bertrand Milliere	2:36.46
2023	Place Du Carrousel	4	Mickael Barzalona	André Fabre	Al Shaqab Racing & Ballylinch Stud	2:35.66
2024	Iresine	7	Marie Vélon	Jean-Pierre Gauvin	Bertrand Milliere	2:34.15
2025	Byzantine Dream	4	Oisin Murphy	Tomoyasu Sakaguchi	Kazumi Yoshida	2:28.32
2026	Daryz	4	Mickael Barzalona	Francis-Henri Graffard	Aga Khan Studs	2:30.89

== Earlier winners ==
- 1955: Norman
- 1956: Fric
- 1957: Blockhaus
- 1958: Primesautier
- 1959: Bel Baraka
- 1960: Suffren
- 1961: Right Royal
- 1962: Exbury
- 1963: Misti
- 1964: Acer
- 1965: Sigebert
- 1966: Taneb
- 1967: Busted
- 1968: Petrone
- 1969: Park Top
- 1970: Lorenzaccio
- 1971: Prominent
- 1972: Snow Castle
- 1973: Direct Flight
- 1974: Allez France
- 1975: Allez France
- 1976: Kasteel
- 1977: Malacate
- 1978: Trillion

== See also ==
- List of French flat horse races
