= Prix Niel =

- Class: Group 2
- Location: Longchamp Racecourse; Paris, France
- Inaugurated: 1864
- Race type: Flat / Thoroughbred
- Sponsor: Qatar
- Website: france-galop.com

Race information
- Distance: 2,400 metres (1½ miles)
- Surface: Turf
- Track: Right-handed
- Qualification: Three-year-olds
- Weight: 58 kg Allowances; 1½ kg for fillies
- Purse: €130,000 (2021); 1st: €74,100

Prix Niel
2025
Cualificar	Bay City Roller	Parachutiste

Previous years
2024
Sosie	Delius	Look De Vega
2023
Fantastic Moon	Feed The Flame	Bravais
2022
Simca Mille	Lassaut	True Testament
2021
Bubble Gift	Baby Rider	Timour

2020-2011
2019
Sottsass	Mutamakina	Mohawk
2018
Brundtland	Hunting Horn	Neufbosc
2017
Cracksman	Avilius	Finche
2016
Makahiki	Midterm	Doha Dream
2015
New Bay	Silverwave	Migwar
2014
Ectot	Teletext	Adelaide
2013
Kizuna	Ruler Of The World	Ocovango
2012
Saonois	Bayrir	Last Train
2011
Reliable Man	Meandre	Vadamar

2010–2001
2010
Behkabad	Planteur	Kidnapping
2009
Cavalryman	Carthage	Aizavoski
2008
Vision D'Etat	Ideal World	Centennial
2007
Soldier Of Fortune	Sagara	Zambezi Sun
2006
Rail Link	Youmzain	Sudan
2005
Hurricane Run	Runaway	Perfect Hedge
2004
Valixir	Prospect Park	Bago
2003
Dalakhani	Doyen	Kris Kin
2002
Sulamani	Gulf News	Morozov
2001
Golan	Anabaa Blue	Chichicastenango

2000-1990
2000
Sinndar	Crimson Quest	Sobieski
1999
Montjeu	Bienamado	First Magnitude
1998
Sagamix	Croco Rouge	Dream Well
1997
Rajpoute	Peintre Celebre	Ivan Luis
1996
Helissio	Darazari	Radevore
1995
Housamix	Poliglote	Winged Love
1994
Carnegie	Northern Spur	Sunshack
1993
Hernando	Dernier Empereur	Dancienne
1992
Songlines	Petit Loup	Apple Tree
1991
Subotica	Pistolet Bleu	Arcangues
1990
Epervier Bleu	Antisaar	Passing Sale

The Prix Niel is a Group 2 flat horse race in France open to three-year-old thoroughbred colts and fillies. It is run at Longchamp over a distance of 2,400 metres (about 1½ miles), in September each year.

The race serves as a trial for the Prix de l'Arc de Triomphe, which is held at the same venue three weeks later.

== History ==
A precursor of the race called the Prix de Chantilly was formerly staged at Chantilly in early September. It was open to horses aged three or older, and for a period its distance was 3,100 metres. It was subsequently transferred to Longchamp and run over 3,000 metres. It was shortened to 2,400 metres in 1952, and reduced to 2,300 metres in 1953.

The Prix de Chantilly was restricted to three-year-olds when a separate event was introduced for older horses in 1955. The new race was initially titled the Prix Henri Foy, and from this point the Prix de Chantilly was contested over 2,400 metres.

The race was cut to 2,000 metres in 1960, and restored to 2,400 metres the following year. It was switched to Chantilly in 1964, and returned to Longchamp with a length of 2,100 metres in 1966. It was extended to 2,200 metres in 1968.

The event was renamed in memory of Gaston Niel (1880–1970), a long-serving member of the Société d'Encouragement, in 1972. For several years the Prix Niel held Group 3 status. It was increased to 2,400 metres in 1979, and promoted to Group 2 level in 1987.

The Prix Niel became part of the Breeders' Cup Challenge series in 2010, with the winner earning an automatic invitation to compete in the Breeders' Cup Turf. It was removed from the series in 2012.

Twelve winners of the race have achieved victory in the same year's Prix de l'Arc de Triomphe. The first was Sica Boy in 1954, and the most recent Rail Link in 2006.

Prix Niel is eligible for geldings from 2020. Due to the 2019–20 coronavirus pandemic, 2020 Prix Niel are not run, and are replaced by the Grand Prix de Paris.

== Records ==
Leading jockey since 1952 (4 wins):

- Yves Saint-Martin – Nelcius (1966), Akarad (1981), Sagace (1983), Mouktar (1985)
- Freddy Head – Taj Dewan (1967), Mississipian (1974), Gay Mecene (1978), Cariellor (1984)

Leading trainer since 1952 (13 wins):

- André Fabre – Cariellor (1984), Trempolino (1987), Subotica (1991), Carnegie (1994), Housamix (1995), Sagamix (1998), Valixir (2004), Hurricane Run (2005), Rail Link (2006), Cavalryman (2009), New Bay (2015), Sosie (2024), Cualificar (2025)

Leading owner since 1952 (5 wins):

- HH Aga Khan IV – Akarad (1981), Mouktar (1985), Sinndar (2000), Dalakhani (2003), Behkabad (2010)

== Winners since 1978 ==
Year	Winner	Jockey	Trainer	Owner	Time
1978	Gay Mecene	Freddy Head	Alec Head	Jacques Wertheimer	2:18.00
1979	Le Marmot	Philippe Paquet	François Boutin	Rodolph Schafer	2:37.70
1980	Prince Bee	Willie Carson	Dick Hern	Sir Michael Sobell	2:32.30
1981	Akarad	Yves Saint-Martin	François Mathet	Aga Khan IV	2:30.40
1982	Bon Sang	Alfred Gibert	Mitri Saliba	Mahmoud Fustok
1983	Sagace	Yves Saint-Martin	Patrick Biancone	Daniel Wildenstein	2:43.50
1984	Cariellor	Freddy Head	André Fabre	Suzy Volterra
1985	Mouktar	Yves Saint-Martin	Alain de Royer-Dupré	Aga Khan IV	2:30.60
1986	Bering	Gary W. Moore	Criquette Head	Ghislaine Head	2:36.80
1987	Trempolino	Pat Eddery	André Fabre	Paul de Moussac	2:38.40
1988	Fijar Tango	Tony Cruz	Georges Mikhalidès	Mahmoud Fustok	2:34.60
1989	Golden Pheasant	Tony Cruz	Jonathan Pease	Bruce McNall	2:32.50
1990	Epervier Bleu	Dominique Boeuf	Élie Lellouche	Daniel Wildenstein	2:32.00
1991	Subotica	Thierry Jarnet	André Fabre	Olivier Lecerf	2:28.50
1992	Songlines	Olivier Benoist	Edouard Bartholomew	Sir Robin McAlpine	2:32.80
1993	Hernando	Cash Asmussen	François Boutin	Stavros Niarchos	2:36.70
1994	Carnegie	Thierry Jarnet	André Fabre	Sheikh Mohammed	2:34.90
1995	Housamix	Thierry Jarnet	André Fabre	Jean-Luc Lagardère	2:36.10
1996	Helissio	Olivier Peslier	Élie Lellouche	Enrique Sarasola	2:30.40
1997	Rajpoute	Gérald Mossé	François Doumen	John Martin	2:30.90
1998	Sagamix	Olivier Peslier	André Fabre	Jean-Luc Lagardère	2:41.30
1999	Montjeu	Michael Kinane	John Hammond	Michael Tabor	2:32.80
2000	Sinndar	Johnny Murtagh	John Oxx	Aga Khan IV	2:26.40
2001	Golan	Kieren Fallon	Sir Michael Stoute	Lord Weinstock	2:27.00
2002	Sulamani	Thierry Thulliez	Pascal Bary	Niarchos Family	3:12.80
2003	Dalakhani	Christophe Soumillon	Alain de Royer-Dupré	Aga Khan IV	2:27.60
2004	Valixir	Éric Legrix	André Fabre	Lagardère Family	2:29.40
2005	Hurricane Run	Kieren Fallon	André Fabre	Michael Tabor	2:30.70
2006	Rail Link	Christophe Soumillon	André Fabre	Khalid Abdullah	2:31.90
2007	Soldier of Fortune	Johnny Murtagh	Aidan O'Brien	Magnier / Smith / Tabor	2:25.60
2008	Vision d'Etat	Ioritz Mendizabal	Eric Libaud	Detré / Libaud	2:27.40
2009	Cavalryman	Frankie Dettori	André Fabre	Godolphin	2:30.10
2010	Behkabad	Christophe Lemaire	Jean-Claude Rouget	Aga Khan IV	2:30.80
2011	Reliable Man	Gérald Mossé	Alain de Royer-Dupré	Pride Racing Club	2:32.43
2012	Saonois	Antoine Hamelin	Jean-Pierre Gauvin	Pascal Treyve	2:35.31
2013	Kizuna	Yutaka Take	Shozo Sasaki	Shinji Maeda	2:37.64
2014	Ectot	Grégory Benoist	Élie Lellouche	Al Shaqab Racing	2:26.36
2015	New Bay	Vincent Cheminaud	André Fabre	Khalid Abdullah	2:35.10
2016 (Note: The 2016 and 2017 races took place at Chantilly while Longchamp was closed for redevelopment)	Makahiki	Christophe Lemaire	Yasuo Tomoichi	Makoto Keneko	2:35.84
2017	Cracksman	Frankie Dettori	John Gosden	Anthony Oppenheimer	2:37.78
2018	Brundtland	James Doyle	Charlie Appleby	Godolphin	2:31.55
2019	Sottsass	Cristian Demuro	Jean-Claude Rouget	White Birch Farm	2:27.46
2020	no race
2021	Bubble Gift	Gérald Mossé	Mikel Delzangles	Zak Bloodstock	2:34.63
2022	Simca Mille	Grégory Benoist	Stephane Wattel	Haras De La Perelle & S Wattel	2:32.81
2023	Fantastic Moon	Rene Piechulek	Sarah Steinberg	Liberty Racing	2:33.20
2024	Sosie	Maxime Guyon	André Fabre	Wertheimer et Frère	2:34.33
2025	Cualificar	William Buick	André Fabre	Godolphin	2:30.56
2026	Varandir	Mickael Barzalona	Francis-Henri Graffard	Aga Khan Studs	2:25.70

== Earlier winners ==
- 1952:
- 1953: Shikampur
- 1954: Sica Boy
- 1955: Walhalla
- 1956:
- 1957: Amber
- 1958: Upstart
- 1959: Montrouge
- 1960: Puissant Chef
- 1961: Devon
- 1962: Kistinie
- 1963: Le Mesnil
- 1964: Sigebert
- 1965: Super Sam
- 1966: Nelcius
- 1967: Taj Dewan
- 1968: Vaguely Noble
- 1969: Belbury
- 1970: Stintino
- 1971: Arlequino
- 1972: Hard to Beat
- 1973: Dahlia
- 1974: Mississipian
- 1975: Anne's Pretender
- 1976: Youth
- 1977: Crystal Palace

== See also ==
- List of French flat horse races
