= White Muzzle =

British-bred Thoroughbred racehorse

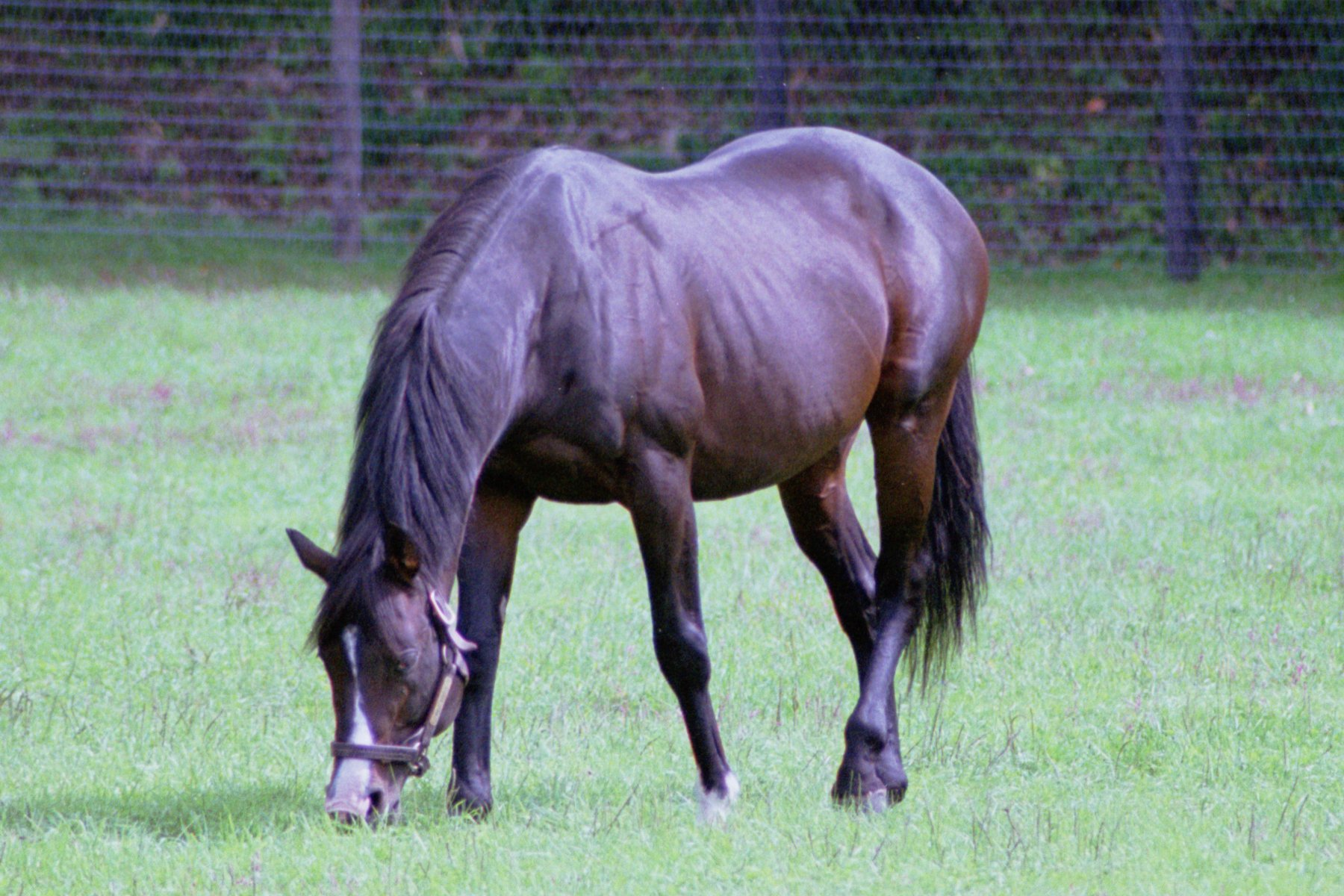
- White Muzzle in 2000
- Sire: Dancing Brave
- Grandsire: Lyphard
- Dam: Fair of the Furze
- Damsire: Ela-Mana-Mou
- Sex: Stallion
- Foaled: 21 March 1990
- Country: United Kingdom
- Colour: Bay
- Breeder: Airlie Stud
- Owner: Luciano Gauci; Zenya Yoshida; Teruya Yoshida
- Trainer: Peter Chapple-Hyam
- Record: 17: 6-3-2
- Earnings: £786,050

Major wins
- Derby Italiano (1993); Churchill Stakes (1993); Grand Prix de Deauville (1994)

White Muzzle (21 March 1990 – February 2017) was a British Thoroughbred racehorse and sire. After failing to win as a juvenile in 1992 he racked up five consecutive wins in the following spring including the Derby Italiano and the Churchill Stakes. Later that year he proved himself one of the best three-year-olds of his generation in Europe as he finished second to older horses in both the King George VI and Queen Elizabeth Stakes and the Prix de l'Arc de Triomphe. As a four-year-old in 1994 he again ran second in the King George VI and Queen Elizabeth Stakes and won the Grand Prix de Deauville. After his retirement from racing he became a successful breeding stallion in Japan.

== Background ==
White Muzzle was a bay horse bred in England by the Airlie Stud. As his name suggested he have a white blaze which covered his muzzle. He began his racing career in the ownership of Luciano Gauci and was trained by Peter Chapple-Hyam at Manton, Wiltshire. Luciano Gauci rode White Muzzle in every race except three, which was ridden by John Reid.

He was from the third and final European crop of foals sired by Dancing Brave whose other offspring included Commander in Chief, Cherokee Rose, Wemyss Bight and Ivanka. White Muzzle's dam Fair of the Furze was a top-class racemare in Ireland, winning the Tattersalls Gold Cup as a four-year-old in 1986, and went on to produce Elfaslah, the dam of Almutawakel. She was descended from the American broodmare Lea Lark (foaled 1945) the female-line ancestor of Miswaki, Tobougg, Southern Halo, Lujain and Peter Davies.

== Racing career ==
=== 1992: two-year-old season ===
White Muzzle began his racing career by finishing third behind Pembroke and The Informer in the Haynes, Hanson and Clark Stakes over one mile at Newbury Racecourse on 18 September 1992. Two weeks later in a maiden race over seven furlongs at Newmarket Racecourse he started 3/1 second favorite and came home third behind Barathea and Gabrl, beaten just over two lengths by the winner.

=== 1993: three-year-old season ===
On 6 April 1993, White Muzzle began his second campaign in a maiden over 10 furlongs at Pontefract Racecourse and recorded his first success as he came home five lengths clear of his rivals at odds of 8/11. The colt followed up two weeks later as he won a minor event over one and a half miles at Catterick Racecourse by six lengths. The apprentice jockey Stephen Davies took the ride when the colt started odds-on favourite for a similar event at Beverley Racecourse and completed his hat-trick as he won one and a half lengths from the Queen's representative Spring To Action. Twelve days after his win at Beverley White Muzzle was sent to Rome to contest the Group 1 Derby Italiano over 2400 meters at Capannelle Racecourse. He took the lead 500 meters from the finish and drew away from the field to win by five lengths from Needle Gun.

At Ascot Racecourse on 19 June White Muzzle started the 1/4 favorite for the Churchill Conditions Stakes and extended his winning run to five as he prevailed by a neck from Right Win. John Reid commented "We were going at no more than half-speed and he was spooking at everything as he went. You won't see the best of him until he's in a proper race". After the race the colt was acquired by the Japanese owner-breeder Zenya Yoshida. Following the death of Yoshida later that year the ownership of White Muzzle passed to his son Teruya. On 24 July White Muzzle started at odds of 9/1 in a ten-runner field for the King George VI and Queen Elizabeth Diamond Stakes. After being restrained in sixth place he stayed on strongly in the straight to take second place behind Opera House with the other beaten horses including Commander In Chief, User Friendly, Drum Taps, Environment Friend and Jeune. In August the colt was dropped back in distance for the International Stakes over ten and a half furlongs at York Racecourse, but after taking the lead half a mile out he faded in the closing stages finishing fifth behind Ezzoud.

On 3 October at Longchamp Racecourse White Muzzle started a 54/1 outsider for the 72nd running of the Prix de l'Arc de Triomphe. He turned into the straight in ninth place and made steady progress in the closing stages but failed by a neck to overhaul the four-year-old filly Urban Sea. For his final run of the year White Muzzle was sent to Tokyo Racecourse for the Japan Cup on 28 November in which he started the 5.4/1 second favorite but ran unplaced behind Legacy World.

=== 1994: four-year-old season ===
On his first run as a four-year-old White Muzzle finished fifth behind Apple Tree in the Coronation Cup over one and a half miles at Epsom Racecourse on 3 June. The Japanese jockey Yutaka Take took the ride on 23 July when the colt contested the King George VI and Queen Elizabeth Diamond Stakes for the second time and started the 9/2 second choice in the betting behind the Epsom Derby winner Erhaab. After racing towards the rear of the field he was repeatedly denied a clear run in the straight before finishing strongly to take second place behind the three-year-old King's Theatre. In August White Muzzle was sent to France for the Grand Prix de Deauville over 2500 meters and started the odds-on favorite against seven opponents including Snurge and Raintrap. He recorded his first victory in well over a year as he won by two and a half length from the Prix de Pomone winner Bright Moon.

At Longchamp on 2 October White Muzzle started at odds of 7/2 in a twenty-runner field in his second attempt to win the Prix de l'Arc de Triomphe. Ridden by Take he came from the rear of the field with a strong late run to finish sixth, two lengths behind the winner Carnegie. Chapple-Hyam reportedly criticised Take for giving the horse too much ground to make up in the straight saying "when you ride a bike, you have to pedal". Two weeks later the colt started favorite for the Canadian International Stakes at Woodbine Racetrack but finished last of the nine runners in a race won by Raintrap. On his final racecourse appearance White Muzzle came home eighth of the fourteen runners behind Tikkanen in the Breeders' Cup Turf at Churchill Downs on 5 November.

== Stud record ==
At the end of White Muzzle's career he was retired and became a breeding stallion at the Yoshida family's Shadai Stallion Station in Hokkaido Japan. White Muzzle sired over 600 race horse winners including, Asakusa Kings (Kikuka Sho), Smile Tomorrow (Yushun Himba), Ingrandire (Tenno Sho), Nihonpiro Ours (Japan Cup Dirt) and Shadow Gate (Singapore Airlines International Cup).

White Muzzle died in February 2017 at the age of 27.

== Pedigree ==
Pedigree of White Muzzle (GB) bay stallion 1990
Sire Dancing Brave (USA) 1983	Lyphard (USA); 1969	Northern Dancer (CAN)	Nearctic
Sire Dancing Brave (USA) 1983	Lyphard (USA); 1969	Northern Dancer (CAN)	Natalma (USA)
Sire Dancing Brave (USA) 1983	Lyphard (USA); 1969	Goofed	Court Martial (GB)
Sire Dancing Brave (USA) 1983	Lyphard (USA); 1969	Goofed	Barra (FR)
Sire Dancing Brave (USA) 1983	Navajo Princess (USA); 1974	Drone	Sir Gaylord
Sire Dancing Brave (USA) 1983	Navajo Princess (USA); 1974	Drone	Cap and Bells
Sire Dancing Brave (USA) 1983	Navajo Princess (USA); 1974	Olmec	Pago Pago (AUS)
Sire Dancing Brave (USA) 1983	Navajo Princess (USA); 1974	Olmec	Chocolate Beau
Dam Fair of the Furze (IRE) 1982	Ela-Mana-Mou (IRE); 1976	Pitcairn	Petingo (GB)
Dam Fair of the Furze (IRE) 1982	Ela-Mana-Mou (IRE); 1976	Pitcairn	Border Bounty (GB)
Dam Fair of the Furze (IRE) 1982	Ela-Mana-Mou (IRE); 1976	Rose Bertin (GB)	High Hat
Dam Fair of the Furze (IRE) 1982	Ela-Mana-Mou (IRE); 1976	Rose Bertin (GB)	Wide Awake
Dam Fair of the Furze (IRE) 1982	Autocratic (IRE); 1974	Tyrant (USA)	Bold Ruler
Dam Fair of the Furze (IRE) 1982	Autocratic (IRE); 1974	Tyrant (USA)	Anadem (IRE)
Dam Fair of the Furze (IRE) 1982	Autocratic (IRE); 1974	Flight Table (USA)	Round Table
Dam Fair of the Furze (IRE) 1982	Autocratic (IRE); 1974	Flight Table (USA)	Fleet Flight (Family 16-g)
