= Carnegie (horse) =

British-bred Thoroughbred racehorse

- Racing colours of Sheikh Mohammed
- Sire: Sadler's Wells
- Grandsire: Northern Dancer
- Dam: Detroit
- Damsire: Riverman
- Sex: Colt
- Foaled: 26 February 1991
- Country: United Kingdom
- Colour: Bay
- Breeder: Swettenham Stud
- Owner: Sheikh Mohammed
- Trainer: André Fabre
- Record: 13: 7-1-1
- Earnings: £890,039

Major wins
- Prix Eugène Adam (1994); Prix Niel (1994); Prix de l'Arc de Triomphe (1994); Grand Prix de Saint-Cloud (1995); Prix Foy (1995)

Carnegie (26 February 1991 – August 2012) was a British-bred, French-trained Thoroughbred racehorse and sire. Unraced as a two-year-old he won four consecutive races as a three-year-old in 1994, culminating with a win in the Prix de l'Arc de Triomphe. He remained in training as a four-year-old, winning the Grand Prix de Saint-Cloud and Prix Foy. He was then retired to stud and had some success as a sire of winners in Australia and New Zealand.

== Background ==
Carnegie was a bay horse with a white blaze and three white socks, bred by Robert Sangster's Swettenham Stud. He was one of the sixth crop of foals sired by Sadler's Wells, who went on to become the Champion sire on thirteen occasions. The same crop included the King George VI and Queen Elizabeth Stakes winner King's Theatre and the Breeders' Cup Turf winner Northern Spur. His dam, Detroit, was an outstanding racemare who won the Prix de l'Arc de Triomphe in 1980. Detroit's dam Dernea was an influential broodmare whose other descendants included Gildoran, Zabeel and Roderic O'Connor.

Before he appeared on a racecourse, Carnegie was sold privately to Sheikh Mohammed. The colt was sent into training with André Fabre at Chantilly and was ridden in all of his races by the French jockey Thierry Jarnet.

== Racing career ==
=== 1994: three-year-old season ===
Carnegie was unraced as a two-year-old and began his racing career in March 1994 when he won the Prix Dardo over 2000 metres at Saint-Cloud Racecourse. On 4 April he finished second to Rainbow Dancer in the Prix de Courcelles over 2100 metres at Longchamp Racecourse with Tikkanen in third place. In the Prix Greffulhe over the same course and distance three weeks later, he finished fifth of the seven runners behind Tikkanen.

Carnegie bypassed the Prix du Jockey Club (won by Celtic Arms) and reappeared at Evry Racecourse for the Listed Prix Pelleas on 22 June, winning by one and half lengths from Zillion. He was then moved back up in class for the Group Two Prix Eugene Adam at Saint-Cloud in July. He took the lead 200 metres from the finish and won by half a length from Cafe Milano.

After a break of two months, Carnegie returned in autumn to contest the Group Two Prix Niel at Longchamp. He turned into the straight in sixth place before taking the lead 200 metres from the finish and winning by one and a half lengths from Northern Spur, with Sunshack third, Celtic Arms fourth and Rainbow Dancer unplaced. On 2 October, Carnegie was one of twenty runners to contest the 73rd running of the Prix de l'Arc de Triomphe and started at odds of 3/1 as part of Sheikh Mohammed's four horse entry which also included King's Theatre, Intrepidity and Richard of York. Jarnet sent the colt into the lead in the straight and he prevailed in a blanket finish from Hernando, Apple Tree, Ezzoud and Bright Moon. His success was a third in the race for Fabre, a second for Jarnet and a first for Sheikh Mohammed.

=== 1995: four-year-old season ===
Carnegie began his four-year-old campaign in June, when he was sent to England to contest the Coronation Cup at Epsom Downs Racecourse. Running for the first time in nine months he finished fifth of the seven runners behind Sunshack, Only Royale, Time Star and Tikkanen. In July he started favourite for the Grand Prix de Saint-Cloud and caught the leader Luso in the closing strides to win by a short neck, with Only Royale, Tikkanen and Sunshack among the beaten horses. Three weeks later he returned to England for the King George VI and Queen Elizabeth Stakes at Ascot Racecourse. He was made the 11/4 second favourite, but was never in serious contention and finished sixth of the seven runners behind Lammtarra.

In his prep race for his second Arc attempt, Carnegie won a slowly run race for the Prix Foy at Longchamp on 10 September, beating the British-trained Godolphin filly Balanchine by a short head. Carnegie and Balanchine were joined by Swain in Sheikh Mohammed's entry for the Arc de Triomphe and started at odds of 2.1/1 in a field of sixteen runners. Carnegie was always in contention, but failed to quicken in the straight and finished sixth behind Lammtarra. On his final appearance, Carnegie was sent to the United States for the Breeders' Cup Turf at Belmont Park. As in the Arc, he was always in touch with the leaders but was only able to run on at one pace in the straight and finished third to Northern Spur and Freedom Cry.

== Stud career ==
Carnegie stood as a breeding stallion in several locations: he was originally based at his owner's Darley Stud in Japan and was also shuttled to stand in New Zealand during the Southern Hemisphere breeding season. He was later moved to Darley's Kelvinside Stud in the Hunter Valley, New South Wales. He had his greatest success in Australia and New Zealand where his best winners included:

- Amalfi, the 2001 Victoria Derby winner.
- Carnegie Express, bay gelding, foaled in 1998, won Canterbury Guineas, Rosehill Guineas
- Perlin, bay gelding, 1999, Doomben Cup, Underwood Stakes
- Vision and Power, bay gelding, 2002, Doncaster Handicap, George Ryder Stakes
- Tuesday Joy, bay mare, 2003, Coolmore Classic, Ranvet Stakes, The BMW, Chipping Norton Stakes

Carnegie was retired from active stud duty in 2008 and was euthanised due to the "infirmities of old age" in August 2012 at the age of twenty-one.

== Pedigree ==
Pedigree of Carnegie (GB), bay stallion, 1991
Sire Sadler's Wells (USA) 1981	Northern Dancer (CAN); 1961	Nearctic	Nearco
Sire Sadler's Wells (USA) 1981	Northern Dancer (CAN); 1961	Nearctic	Lady Angela
Sire Sadler's Wells (USA) 1981	Northern Dancer (CAN); 1961	Natalma	Native Dancer
Sire Sadler's Wells (USA) 1981	Northern Dancer (CAN); 1961	Natalma	Almahmoud
Sire Sadler's Wells (USA) 1981	Fairy Bridge (USA); 1975	Bold Reason	Hail To Reason
Sire Sadler's Wells (USA) 1981	Fairy Bridge (USA); 1975	Bold Reason	Lalun
Sire Sadler's Wells (USA) 1981	Fairy Bridge (USA); 1975	Special	Forli
Sire Sadler's Wells (USA) 1981	Fairy Bridge (USA); 1975	Special	Thong
Dam Detroit (FR) 1977	Riverman (USA); 1969	Never Bend	Nasrullah
Dam Detroit (FR) 1977	Riverman (USA); 1969	Never Bend	Lalun
Dam Detroit (FR) 1977	Riverman (USA); 1969	River Lady	Prince John
Dam Detroit (FR) 1977	Riverman (USA); 1969	River Lady	Nile Lily
Dam Detroit (FR) 1977	Derna (FR); 1961	Sonny Boy	Jock
Dam Detroit (FR) 1977	Derna (FR); 1961	Sonny Boy	Fille de Soleil
Dam Detroit (FR) 1977	Derna (FR); 1961	Miss Barberie	Noreman
Dam Detroit (FR) 1977	Derna (FR); 1961	Miss Barberie	Vaneuse (Family: 16-c)
