= Opera House (horse) =

British-bred Thoroughbred racehorse

- Racing colours of Sheikh Mohammed
- Sire: Sadler's Wells
- Grandsire: Northern Dancer
- Dam: Colorspin
- Damsire: High Top
- Sex: Stallion
- Foaled: February 24, 1988
- Died: April 20, 2016
- Country: Great Britain
- Colour: Bay
- Breeder: Meon Valley Stud
- Owner: Sheikh Mohammed
- Trainer: Michael Stoute
- Record: 18: 8-4-3
- Earnings: £737,701 + F1,200,000

Major wins
- Tattersalls Rogers Gold Cup (1992); Brigadier Gerard Stakes (1992); Cumberland Lodge Stakes (1992); Coronation Cup (1993); Eclipse Stakes (1993); K. George VI & Q. Elizabeth Stakes (1993)

Awards
- European Champion Older Horse (1993)

Opera House (February 24, 1988 – April 20, 2016) was a British thoroughbred racehorse and sire. In a racing career which lasted from October 1990 until November 1993 he ran eighteen times and won eight races. Opera House was best known for his performances as a five-year-old in 1993, when he won three Group One races, including the King George VI and Queen Elizabeth Stakes and was named European Champion Older Horse. Retired to stud in Japan, he developed into a top-class sire in the country, supplying seven-time Grade 1 winner T. M. Opera O, four-time Group 1 winner Meisho Samson and multiple Group scorer Miyabi Ranveli.

== Background ==
Opera House, a bay horse with a white star, was bred by the Meon Valley Stud in Hampshire. He was sired by Sadler's Wells, out of Colorspin, a daughter of High Top. Sadler's Wells (1981–2011) won three Group One races in 1984 and went on to sire the winners of over 2,000 races including more than 130 at Group One/Grade I level. He was the most successful sire in the history of British racing being the leading Leading sire in Great Britain and Ireland a record fourteen times. Colorspin won the Irish Oaks and was a half-sister of the Prix de l'Opéra winner Bella Colora and the Irish Champion Stakes winner Cezanne. Apart from Opera House, she also produced his full brother, the champion stayer Kayf Tara and the Prix de l'Opéra winner Zee Zee Top.

Opera House raced in the colours of Sheikh Mohammed and was trained throughout his career by Michael Stoute at Newmarket, Suffolk. His most regular jockeys were Steve Cauthen and Michael Roberts.

== Racing career ==
=== 1990: two-year-old season ===
Opera House did not appear on a racecourse until the Autumn of 1990. At Leicester in October he started odds on for an eleven-runner maiden race and pulled clear in the closing stages to win by ten lengths.

Shortly after the race, Opera House was exercising at Newmarket when he tripped and fell on a road. He sustained a fracture to his pastern which put his career in jeopardy and kept him of the course for eleven months.

=== 1991: three-year-old season ===
Opera House's three-year-old debut was delayed by his recuperation from injury and he did not race until September, when he won a three-runner race at Nottingham. Three weeks later, he was beaten a neck by the future Prince of Wales's Stakes winner Perpendicular in a Listed race at Goodwood. On his final start of the year he was moved up to Group Three class for the St. Simon Stakes at Newbury. He led in the straight before fading in the final furlong and finishing fourth to Further Flight.

=== 1992: four-year-old season ===
On his 1992 debut, Opera House put up his best performance to date. Although he was beaten in the Gordon Richards Stakes he looked unlucky in running and did well to finish third behind Dear Doctor (Arlington Million) and Red Bishop (Hong Kong Vase). He then recorded his first major win when getting up in the last stride to beat Zoman (Washington, D.C. International) in the Tattersalls Gold Cup at The Curragh. Ten days later he returned to England to win the Group Three Brigadier Gerard Stakes at Sandown.

Opera House lost his next three starts, beginning with a disappointing sixth place in the Prince of Wales's Stakes at Royal Ascot. He was moved up to Group One level and performed with credit, finishing second to Kooyonga in the Eclipse Stakes and third to St Jovite in the King George VI and Queen Elizabeth Stakes.

After a short break he returned to win his third important win of the season, staying on gamely to beat Red Bishop by one and a half lengths in the Cumberland Lodge Stakes Previewing the race, one correspondent described Opera House as a "consistent slugger"- a brave and dependable horse, rather than a brilliant one. Plans to send the horse to America for the Breeders' Cup Turf did not come to fruition.

=== 1993: five-year-old season ===
As a five-year-old, Opera House contested seven races, all of them at Group One level, and won three times. He was ridden in all but one of his races by Michael Roberts. On his debut he traveled to France for the first time for the Prix Ganay at Longchamp, where he led in the straight before being caught close home and narrowly beaten by Vert Amande.

At the Derby meeting at Epsom in June he recorded his first Group One win when getting up to win the Coronation Cup in a "blanket finish" from Environment Friend and Apple Tree. A month later he took the Eclipse Stakes at Sandown, leading in the straight and holding off the late challenge of the Italian champion Misil by a short-head. The beaten horses included the Breeders' Cup winners Barathea and Arcangues. Opera House was ridden at Sandown by Michael Kinane as Roberts chose to ride Barathea, who he felt would be better suited by the fast ground. The Independent's correspondent described the performance as "commendable" whilst questioning the overall value of the form. In the King George at Ascot, Opera House was made 8/1 third favourite in a strong field, behind The Derby winner Commander in Chief and the 1992 European Horse of the Year User Friendly. Ridden by Michael Roberts, Opera House tracked the leaders before being moved into the lead two furlongs out and stayed on strongly to beat White Muzzle by one and a half lengths with Commander in Chief third. After the race, Stoute praised the horse, saying "I hope for his sake they'll now give him some credit."

On his next start Opera House was made evens favourite for the Irish Champion Stakes at Leopardstown. He took the lead in the straight but was caught inside the final furlong and beaten half a length by Muhtarram. In the Prix de l'Arc de Triomphe at Longchamp in October he took the lead in the straight and ran on under pressure after being headed to finish third, beaten a neck and half a length by Urban Sea and White Muzzle. Stoute offered no excuses, although he pointed out that the very soft ground might not have suited the horse. On his final start he travelled to California for the Breeders' Cup Turf in which he finished sixth behind Kotashaan.

An invitation to run in the Japan Cup was declined, and Opera House was retired to stud by his new owners, the Japan Racing Association.

== Assessment, honors and awards ==
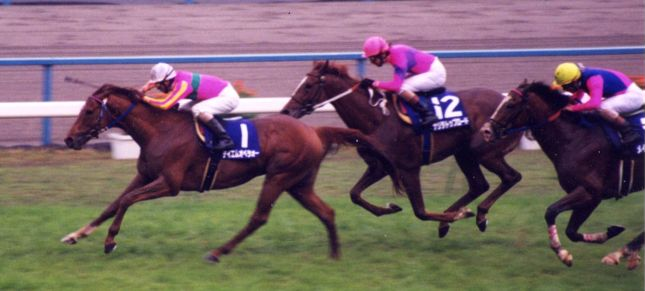
T. M. Opera O; Opera House's record-breaking son

Opera House was named European Champion Older Horse at the 1993 Cartier Racing Awards.

In the International Classification for 1993, Opera House was rated the best older horse in Europe with a figure of 129, one pound below the three-year-old champion Zafonic.

== Stud career ==
Opera House retired to the Shizunai Stallion Station in Japan, where he died following a paddock accident during April 2016. The stallion was retired from stud duties in 2013 after nineteen breeding seasons at Shizunai Stallion Station.

His progeny include the World's leading money earner T. M. Opera O (Japan Cup, Arima Kinen, Tenno Sho), and Meisho Samson (Japanese Derby, Tenno Sho).

== Pedigree ==
Pedigree of Opera House, bay stallion 1988
Sire Sadler's Wells (USA) 1981	Northern Dancer (CAN); 1961	Nearctic	Nearco (ITY)
Sire Sadler's Wells (USA) 1981	Northern Dancer (CAN); 1961	Nearctic	Lady Angela (GB)
Sire Sadler's Wells (USA) 1981	Northern Dancer (CAN); 1961	Natalma (USA)	Native Dancer
Sire Sadler's Wells (USA) 1981	Northern Dancer (CAN); 1961	Natalma (USA)	Almahmoud
Sire Sadler's Wells (USA) 1981	Fairy Bridge (USA); 1975	Bold Reason	Hail to Reason
Sire Sadler's Wells (USA) 1981	Fairy Bridge (USA); 1975	Bold Reason	Lalun
Sire Sadler's Wells (USA) 1981	Fairy Bridge (USA); 1975	Special	Forli (ARG)
Sire Sadler's Wells (USA) 1981	Fairy Bridge (USA); 1975	Special	Thong
Dam Colorspin (FR) 1983	High Top (IRE); 1969	Derring-Do (GB)	Darius
Dam Colorspin (FR) 1983	High Top (IRE); 1969	Derring-Do (GB)	Sipsey Bridge
Dam Colorspin (FR) 1983	High Top (IRE); 1969	Camenae (GB)	Vimy (FR)
Dam Colorspin (FR) 1983	High Top (IRE); 1969	Camenae (GB)	Madrilene
Dam Colorspin (FR) 1983	Reprocolor (GB); 1976	Jimmy Reppin	Midsummer Night (USA)
Dam Colorspin (FR) 1983	Reprocolor (GB); 1976	Jimmy Reppin	Sweet Molly (IRE)
Dam Colorspin (FR) 1983	Reprocolor (GB); 1976	Blue Queen	Majority Blue (IRE)
Dam Colorspin (FR) 1983	Reprocolor (GB); 1976	Blue Queen	Hill Queen (family 13-e)
