= Olivier Lecerf =

French businessman (1928–2006)

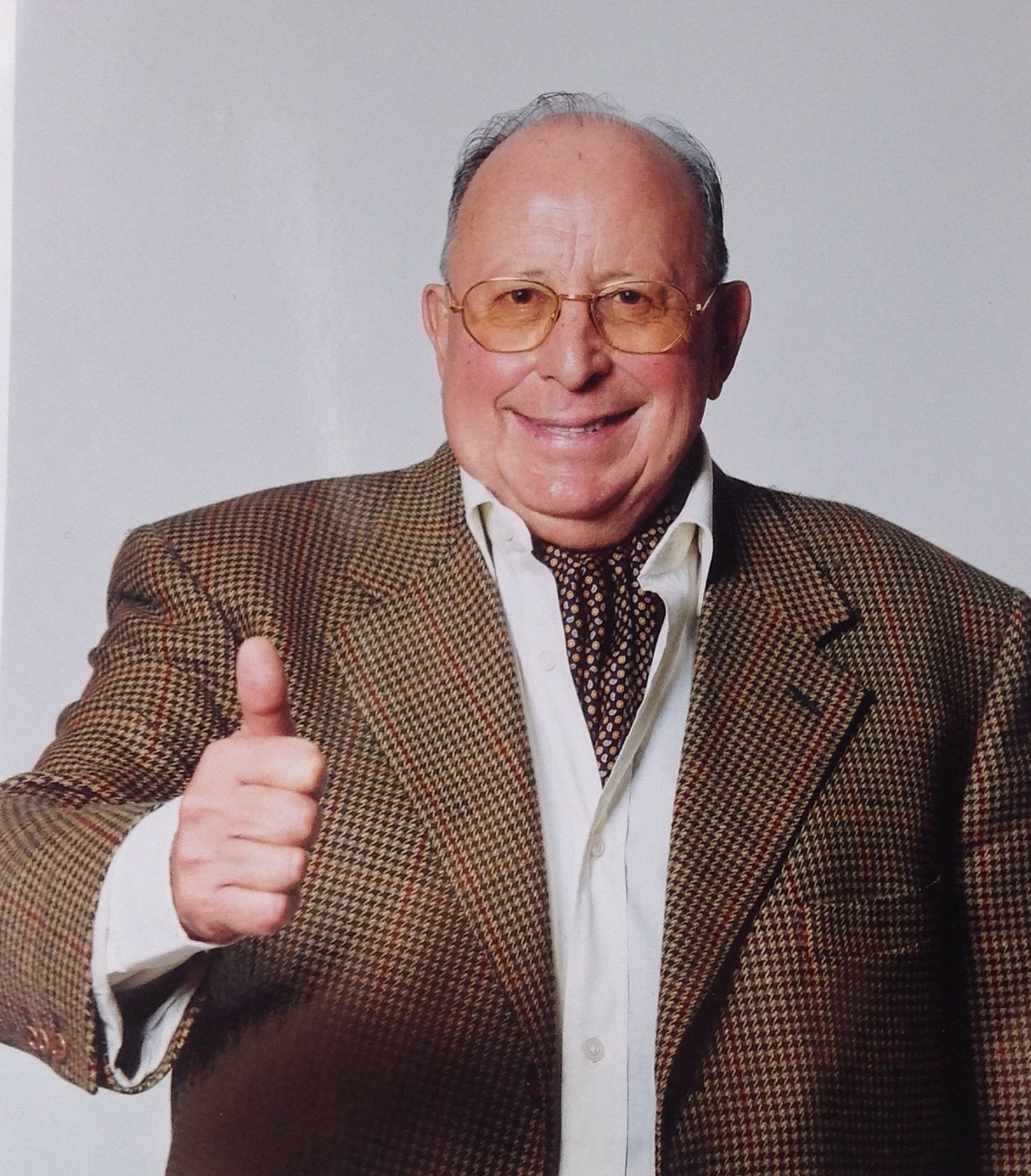
Olivier Lecerf

Olivier Lecerf (1928 – August 10, 2006) was a French businessman and a Thoroughbred racehorse owner.

== Business career ==
A resident of Paris, from 1974 to 1989 Olivier Lecerf was at the helm of the French-based multinational industrial conglomerate Lafarge Group, serving as its CEO and Chairman of the Board of Directors.

He was voted France's 1981 "Manager of the Year" (Manager de l'année (France)) by the French National Assembly.

Olivier Lecerf was also a member of the European Round Table of Industrialists (ERT) and an administrator of the global cosmetics giant L'Oréal from 1990 to 2004.

In 1991 Editions de Fallois published Lecerf's book Au risque de gagner - Le métier de dirigeant (ISBN 978-2877061209). The book contained his comments and views on being a company leader and the stakes and issues involved.

== Thoroughbred horse racing ==
An owner-breeder of Thoroughbred racehorses, in 1986 Olivier Lecerf was chosen president of the Fédération nationale des sociétés de courses.

Lecerf's greatest success in racing came with his colt Subotica, who won two of the French Classic Races when he captured the 1991 Grand Prix de Paris and the 1992 Prix de l'Arc de Triomphe.

Olivier Lecerf died at age 77 in 2006.

== Bibliography ==
- Lafarge website
- Olivier Lecerf at the Académie des Sciences Morales et Politiques (in French)
