= Preis von Europa =

- Class: Group 1
- Location: Köln-Weidenpesch; Cologne, Germany
- Inaugurated: 1963
- Race type: Flat / Thoroughbred
- Website: Köln-Weidenpesch

Race information
- Distance: 2,400 metres (1½ miles)
- Surface: Turf
- Track: Right-handed
- Qualification: Three-years-old and up
- Weight: 57 kg (3yo); 60 kg (4yo+); Allowances; 1½ kg for fillies and mares
- Purse: €125,000 (2021); 1st: €70,000

Preis von Europa
2021
| Alpinista | Nerium | Sisfahan |

Previous years
2020
Donjah | Kaspar | Dame Malliot
2019
Aspetar | Amorella | Donjah
2018
Khan | Walsingham | Windstoss
2017
Windstoss | Son Macia | Colomano
2016
Nightflower | Red Cardinal | Kasalla
2015
Nightflower | Sirius | Dubday
2014
Empoli | Earl Of Tinsdal | Night Wish
2013
Meandre | Vif Monsieur | Earl Of Tinsdal
2012
Girolamo | Feuerblitz | Araldo
2011
Campanologist | Ibicenco | Earl Of Tinsdal

2010-2000
2010
Scalo | Night Magic | Quijano
2009
Jukebox Jury | Eastern Anthem | Eliot
2008
Baila Me | Poseidon Adventure | King Of Rome
2007
Schiaparelli | Poseidon Adventure | Ioannina
2006
Youmzain | Egerton | Enforcer
2005
Gonbarda | Simonas | Salutino
2004
Albanova | Saldentigerin | Darsalam
2003
Mamool | Albanova | Well Made
2002
Well Made | Salve Regina | Yavana's Pace
2001
Kutub | Yavana's Pace | Noroit
2000
Golden Snake | Yavana's Pace | Catella

The Preis von Europa is a Group 1 flat horse race in Germany open to thoroughbreds aged three years or older. It is run at Cologne over a distance of 2,400 metres (about 1½ miles), and it is scheduled to take place each year in September.

== History ==
The event was established in 1963, a year after the discontinuation of the Gladiatoren-Rennen at Krefeld. Its predecessor was contested over 2,800 metres, and the last running was won by a horse called Opponent. The same horse won the inaugural edition of the Preis von Europa, run over 2,400 metres at Cologne.

The present system of race grading was introduced in Germany in 1972, and the Preis von Europa was classed at the highest level, Group 1.

The race has been sponsored by several different companies since the 1980s, including Puma, Deutsche Post and IVG.

With its 64th running in 2026, the Preis von Europa has been run at the same venue throughout its history.

== Records ==
Most successful horse (3 wins):

- Anilin – 1965, 1966, 1967

Leading jockey (4 wins):

- Andrasch Starke - Schiaparelli (2007), Girolamo (2012), Nightflower (2015, 2016)

Leading trainer (7 wins):

- Heinz Jentzsch – Lombard (1971), Days at Sea (1974), Ebano (1977), Ataxerxes (1982), Monsun (1993, 1994), Solon (1995)

Leading owner (4 wins):

- Voskhod Stud – Anilin (1965, 1966, 1967), Aden (1978)

== Winners ==
| Year | Winner | Age | Jockey | Trainer | Owner | Time |
|---|---|---|---|---|---|---|
| 1963 | Opponent | 5 | Hein Bollow | Josef Hochstein | Mrs N. Thissen | 2:36.20 |
| 1964 | Fujiyama | 4 | E. Windrif | Miguel Clément | Edmond de Rothschild | 2:36.50 |
| 1965 | Anilin | 4 | Nikolai Nasibov | W. Schimschirt | Voskhod Stud | 2:32.20 |
| 1966 | Anilin | 5 | Nikolai Nasibov | Nikolai Nasibov | Voskhod Stud | 2:37.80 |
| 1967 | Anilin | 6 | Nikolai Nasibov | Nikolai Nasibov | Voskhod Stud | 2:31.70 |
| 1968 | Arjon | 5 | Robert Jallu | Henri van de Poele | P. Hilger | 2:35.50 |
| 1969 | Tajo | 4 | Johannes Starosta | Heinz Gummelt | Gestüt Ravensberg | 2:31.90 |
| 1970 | Cortez | 5 | Oskar Langner | Sven von Mitzlaff | Gestüt Zoppenbroich | 2:34.30 |
| 1971 | Lombard | 4 | Fritz Drechsler | Heinz Jentzsch | Gestüt Schlenderhan | 2:33.10 |
| 1972 | Prince Ippi | 3 | Willie Carson | Theo Grieper | Gestüt Röttgen | 2:32.20 |
| 1973 | Acacio d'Aguilar | 4 | Georges Doleuze | Miguel Clément | James Goldsmith | 2:30.20 |
| 1974 | Days at Sea | 3 | Fritz Drechsler | Heinz Jentzsch | Gestüt Sybille | 2:39.00 |
| 1975 | Windwurf | 3 | Jerzy Jednaszewski | Heinz Gummelt | Gestüt Ravensberg | 2:31.60 |
| 1976 | Windwurf | 4 | Jerzy Jednaszewski | Heinz Gummelt | Gestüt Ravensberg | 2:34.50 |
| 1977 | Ebano | 4 | Ralf Suerland | Heinz Jentzsch | Gestüt Fährhof | 2:30.60 |
| 1978 | Aden | 3 | Alexander Chuguevets | Nikolai Nasibov | Voskhod Stud | 2:30.40 |
| 1979 | Nebos | 3 | Lutz Mäder | Hein Bollow | Countess Batthyany | 2:32.60 |
| 1980 | Pawiment | 6 | Otto Gervai | Charly Seiffert | Gestüt Moritzberg | 2:34.80 |
| 1981 | Glint of Gold | 3 | John Matthias | Ian Balding | Paul Mellon | 2:43.80 |
| 1982 | Ataxerxes | 5 | Andrzej Tylicki | Heinz Jentzsch | Gestüt Schlenderhan | 2:39.80 |
| 1983 | Esprit du Nord | 3 | Lester Piggott | John Fellows | Robin Scully | 2:31.20 |
| 1984 | Gold and Ivory | 3 | Steve Cauthen | Ian Balding | Paul Mellon | 2:38.80 |
| 1985 | Sumayr | 3 | Yves Saint-Martin | Alain de Royer-Dupré | HH Aga Khan IV | 2:27.00 |
| 1986 | Allez Milord | 3 | Greville Starkey | Guy Harwood | Jerome Brody | 2:34.13 |
| 1987 | Kamiros | 5 | Peter Alafi | Harro Remmert | Dieter Stein | 2:31.76 |
| 1988 | Kondor | 4 | Peter Remmert | Hein Bollow | Ilse Ramm | 2:38.32 |
| 1989 | Ibn Bey | 5 | Richard Quinn | Paul Cole | Fahd Salman | 2:34.57 |
| 1990 | Mondrian | 4 | Manfred Hofer | Uwe Stoltefuss | Stall Hanse | 2:39.97 |
| 1991 | Lomitas | 3 | Peter Schiergen | Andreas Wöhler | Gestüt Fährhof | 2:27.65 |
| 1992 | Apple Tree | 3 | Thierry Jarnet | André Fabre | Paul de Moussac | 2:31.67 |
| 1993 | Monsun | 3 | Andrzej Tylicki | Heinz Jentzsch | Georg von Ullmann | 2:42.23 |
| 1994 | Monsun | 4 | Andrzej Tylicki | Heinz Jentzsch | Georg von Ullmann | 2:32.90 |
| 1995 | Solon | 3 | Peter Schiergen | Heinz Jentzsch | Gestüt Schlenderhan | 2:27.06 |
| 1996 | Lavirco | 3 | Torsten Mundry | Peter Rau | Gestüt Fährhof | 2:28.63 |
| 1997 | Taipan | 5 | Sylvain Guillot | John Dunlop | 4th Baron Swaythling | 2:31.88 |
| 1998 | Taipan | 6 | Sylvain Guillot | John Dunlop | Exors of Lord Swaythling | 2:29.90 |
| 1999 | Belenus | 3 | Kevin Woodburn | Andreas Wöhler | Turf Syndikat 99 | 2:33.13 |
| 2000 | Golden Snake | 4 | Davy Bonilla | John Dunlop | The National Stud | 2:32.49 |
| 2001 | Kutub | 4 | Frankie Dettori | Saeed bin Suroor | Godolphin | 2:38.21 |
| 2002 | Well Made | 5 | Terence Hellier | Hans Blume | Gestüt Röttgen | 2:31.02 |
| 2003 | Mamool | 4 | Frankie Dettori | Saeed bin Suroor | Godolphin | 2:35.20 |
| 2004 | Albanova | 5 | Seb Sanders | Sir Mark Prescott | Kirsten Rausing | 2:36.12 |
| 2005 | Gonbarda | 3 | Filip Minařík | Uwe Ostmann | Gestüt Auenquelle | 2:33.78 |
| 2006 | Youmzain | 3 | Kieren Fallon | Mick Channon | Jaber Abdullah | 2:28.51 |
| 2007 | Schiaparelli | 4 | Andrasch Starke | Peter Schiergen | Stall Blankenese | 2:29.70 |
| 2008 | Baila Me | 3 | Dominique Boeuf | Werner Baltromei | Gestüt Karlshof | 2:32.10 |
| 2009 | Jukebox Jury | 3 | Royston Ffrench | Mark Johnston | Alan Spence | 2:29.56 |
| 2010 | Scalo | 3 | Olivier Peslier | Andreas Wöhler | Gestüt Ittlingen | 2:34.53 |
| 2011 | Campanologist | 6 | Frankie Dettori | Saeed bin Suroor | Godolphin | 2:28.66 |
| 2012 | Girolamo | 3 | Andrasch Starke | Peter Schiergen | Gestüt Ebbesloh | 2:26.37 |
| 2013 | Meandre | 5 | Adrie de Vries | Arslangirej Savujev | Ramzan Kadyrov | 2:29.88 |
| 2014 | Empoli | 4 | Adrie de Vries | Peter Schiergen | Bukhtoyarov / Kappushev | 2:30.42 |
| 2015 | Nightflower | 3 | Andrasch Starke | Peter Schiergen | Stall Nizza | 2:31.55 |
| 2016 | Nightflower | 4 | Andrasch Starke | Peter Schiergen | Stall Nizza | 2:29.30 |
| 2017 | Windstoss | 3 | Adrie de Vries | Marcus Klug | Gestut Rottgen | 2:32.40 |
| 2018 | Khan | 4 | Clement Lecouevre | Henk Grewe | Darius Racing | 2:37.47 |
| 2019 | Aspetar | 4 | Jason Watson | Roger Charlton | Mohammed bin Khalifa Al Thani | 2:26.00 |
| 2020 | Donjah | 4 | Clement Lecoeuvre | Henk Grewe | Darius Racing | 2:31.82 |
| 2021 | Alpinista | 4 | Luke Morris | Sir Mark Prescott | Kirsten Rausing | 2:29.96 |
| 2022 | Rebel's Romance | 4 | William Buick | Charlie Appleby | Godolphin | 2:30.97 |
| 2023 | India | 5 | Rene Piechulek | Waldemar Hickst | Gestut Ittlingen | 2:29.09 |
| 2024 | Rebel's Romance | 6 | William Buick | Charlie Appleby | Godolphin | 2:25.91 |
| 2025 | Sibayan | 4 | Mickael Barzalona | Francis-Henri Graffard | Aga Khan Studs SCEA | 2:29.52 |
| 2026 | Goliath | 6 | Christophe Soumillon | Francis-Henri Graffard | Resolute Bloodstock & Philip Baron Von Ullmann | 2:27.78 |

== See also ==
- List of German flat horse races
