= Subotica (horse) =

French-bred Thoroughbred racehorse

- Racing silks of Olivier Lecerf
- Sire: Pampabird
- Grandsire: Pampapaul
- Dam: Terre de Feu
- Damsire: Busted
- Sex: Stallion
- Foaled: 1988
- Country: France
- Colour: Bay
- Breeder: Paul de Moussac
- Owner: Olivier Lecerf
- Trainer: André Fabre
- Record: 14: 6-4-1
- Earnings: €1,449,438

Major wins
- Prix Isonomy (1990); Grand Prix de Paris (1991); Prix Niel (1991); Prix de l'Arc de Triomphe (1992); Prix Ganay (1992)

Subotica (foaled February 13, 1988 in Orne) is a French Thoroughbred racehorse best known for winning the Prix de l'Arc de Triomphe in 1992.

== Background ==
Subotica is a bay horse bred by Paul de Moussac at his Haras du Mezeray in Lower Normandy. Through his sire, Pampabird, owned by de Moussac, Subotica is a descendant of the great Nearco. He was out of de Moussac's mare Terre de Feu, a daughter of the 1967 United Kingdom Horse of the Year, Busted.

Purchased and raced by Olivier Lecerf, Subotica was trained by André Fabre and ridden in all his major races by Thierry Jarnet.

== Racing career ==
In 1991, Subotica ran second in the Prix du Jockey Club to Suave Dancer, whom he had beaten in the Prix Ganay. He went on to earn his most important win of 1991 by taking the Group One Grand Prix de Paris. Health problems forced the horse to be withdrawn from France's most prestigious race, the Prix de l'Arc de Triomphe. However, the following year, the colt won the Arc, beating a strong field that included the undefeated filly User Friendly (2nd); St Jovite (4th), who had won the Irish Derby by twelve lengths in record time; and Epsom Derby winner Dr Devious (6th).

Sent to Gulfstream Park in Florida for the October 31, 1992 Breeders' Cup Turf, Subotica finished fifth to upset winner Fraise.

== Stud record ==
Subotica retired to stud on November 24. His progeny have met with limited racing success.
