= Thierry Jarnet =

French jockey (born 1967)

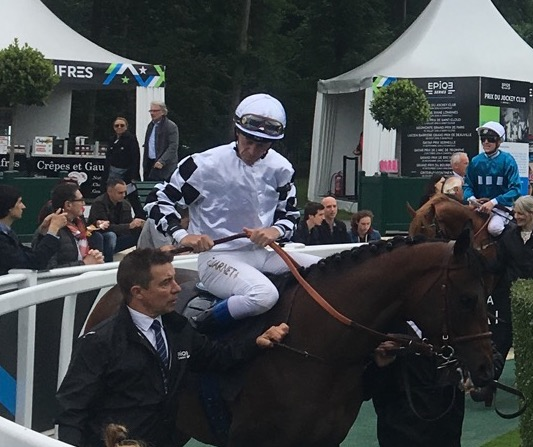
- Jarnet in 2016

Personal information
- Born: 24 March 1967 (age 59) France
- Occupation: Jockey

Horse racing career
- Sport: Horse racing
- Career wins: Ongoing

Major racing wins
- Prix du Cadran (1991); Grand Prix de Paris (1991, 1992, 1996, 1999); Prix Ganay (1992, 2006); Prix de l'Arc de Triomphe (1992, 1994, 2013, 2014); Critérium de Saint-Cloud (1993); Prix Saint-Alary (1993, 1994, 1996, 2002); Prix Vermeille (1993, 2015); Prix d'Ispahan (1993, 1999); Grand Prix de Chantilly (1993, 1994, 2003); Prix de la Salamandre (1994); Grand Prix de Saint-Cloud (1994, 1995, 2002, 2003, 2015); Prix du Chemin de Fer du Nord (2001, 2003); Prix Vicomtesse Vigier (2003); Prix de Diane (2013) International race wins: Gran Premio d'Italia (1991); Champion Stakes (1991); Preis von Europa (1992); Dewhurst Stakes (1994) Coronation Cup (1994); 2,000 Guineas (1995); Hong Kong Vase (2002)

Racing awards
- French flat racing Champion Jockey (1992, 1993, 1994, 1995)

Significant horses
- Danini, Subotica, Pigeon Voyageur; Victoire Bleu, Tel Quel, Apple Tree; Homme de Loi, Sunshack, Intrepidity, Arcangues, Moonlight Dance, Carnegie, Pennekamp, Grape Tree Road, Luna Wells, Nononito, Slickly, Croco Rouge, Bluemamba, Amonita, Marotta, Ange Gabriel, Cut Quartz, Tripat, Swedish Shave
- Updated on 16 March 2008

Thierry Jarnet (born 24 March 1967) is a champion thoroughbred flat racing jockey in France who won the title four times between 1992–1995. Jarnet was first apprenticed to Patrick Rago at Maisons-Laffitte and then to Yann Porzier at Chantilly, Oise.

== History ==
Jarnet rode his first winner in February 1985 at Cagnes-sur-Mer on a horse called Danini. Jarnet rode 137 winners in France between 1985 and 1990. In November 1990, Jarnet signed up to ride for the trainer André Fabre. Jarnet's first ride for Fabre was a winning one on a horse called Subotica, that also went on to provide him with Jarnet's first Group One victory in the 1991 Grand Prix de Paris.

1991 was to also bring him victories aboard Victoire Bleu in the Prix du Cadran and Tel Quel in the Champion Stakes. With the departure of Cash Asmussen in 1991 Jarnet also took over the role as stable jockey which made him the rider for Sheikh Mohammed in France. 1992 saw Jarnet gaine his first key win by landing the Prix de l'Arc de Triomphe on Subotica, he repeated this win in 1994 on Carnegie. Jarnet won 124 races from 807 rides in 1992 to become French Champion Jockey for the first time. Jarnet won the 'Cravache d'Or' (jockeys' title) for the next three years. In 1995, he finished only three winners in front of Olivier Peslier, who at that stage was riding the many horses that André Fabre trained for Daniel Wildenstein. In 1996, Peslier moved ahead of Jarnet.

== Major wins ==
France

- Prix de l'Arc de Triomphe - (4) - Subotica (1992), Carnegie (1994), Treve (2013, 2014)
- Prix de Diane - (1) - Treve (2013)
- Poule d'Essai des Poulains - (1) - Tin Horse (2011)
- Poule d'Essai des Pouliches - (1) - Bluemamba (2000)
- Grand Prix de Paris - (4) - Subotica (1991), Homme de Loi (1992), Grape Tree Road (1996), Slickly (1999)
- Grand Prix de Saint-Cloud - (5) - Apple Tree (1994), Carnegie (1995), Ange Gabriel (2002, 2003), Treve (2015)
- Prix Saint-Alary - (4) - Intrepidity (1993), Moonlight Dance (1994), Luna Wells (1996), Marotta (2002)
- Prix Maurice de Gheest - (3) - Moonlight Cloud (2011, 2012, 2013)
- Prix Ganay - (2) - Subotica (1992), Corre Caminos (2006)
- Prix du Moulin de Longchamp - (2) - Moonlight Cloud (2012), Charm Spirit (2014)
- Prix Vermeille - (2) - Intrepidity (1993), Treve (2015)
- Prix du Cadran - (2) - Victoire Bleue (1991), Nononito (1996)
- Prix d'Ispahan - (2) - Arcangues (1994), Croco Rouge (1999)
- Prix Jacques Le Marois - (1) - Moonlight Cloud (2013)
- Prix Royal-Oak - (1) - Sunshack (1995)
- Critérium de Saint-Cloud - (1) - Sunshack (1993)
- Prix de la Salamandre - (1) - Pennekamp (1994)
- Prix de la Forêt - (1) - Moonlight Cloud (2013)
- Prix Marcel Boussac - (1) - Amonita (2000)
- Prix de l'Opéra - (1) - We Are (2014)

United Kingdom

- 2000 Guineas Stakes - (1) - Pennekamp (1995)
- Champion Stakes - (1) - Tel Quel (1991)
- Coronation Cup - (1) - Apple Tree (1994)
- Dewhurst Stakes - (1) - Pennekamp (1995)

Hong Kong

- Hong Kong Vase - (1) - Ange Gabriel (2002)

Italy

- Gran Premio d'Italia - (1) - Pigeon Voyageur (1991)
- Premio Lydia Tesio - (1) - Lune d'Or (2004)

Germany

- Preis von Europa - (1) - Apple Tree (1992)
