= Tikkanen (horse) =

Thoroughbred racehorse

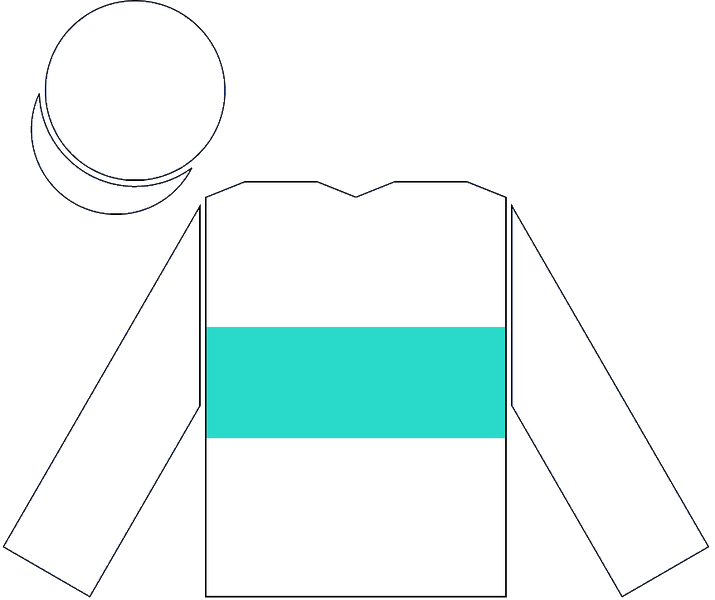
- Racing silks of George Strawbridge
- Sire: Cozzene
- Grandsire: Caro
- Dam: Reiko
- Damsire: Targowice
- Sex: Stallion
- Foaled: 1991 (age 34–35)
- Country: United States
- Colour: Gray
- Breeder: George W. Strawbridge Jr.
- Owner: Augustin Stable
- Trainer: Jonathan Pease
- Record: 18: 4-2-3
- Earnings: US$1,599,335

Major wins
- Prix Greffulhe (1994); Turf Classic Invitational Stakes (1994) Breeders' Cup wins: Breeders' Cup Turf (1994)

Tikkanen (23 January 1991 – 18 April 2015) was an American Thoroughbred racehorse who competed internationally.

== Background ==
He was owned and bred by American George W. Strawbridge Jr., an avid ice hockey fan and a shareholder and Director of the National Hockey League's Buffalo Sabres who named the foal for the Finnish player, Esa Tikkanen. From a family involved in steeplechase and flat racing, George W. Strawbridge Jr. maintained racing stables in France and the United States. Tikkanen was sent into training with Chantilly-based trainer Jonathan Pease.

== Racing career ==
Tikkanen raced twice at age two earning a win plus a third-place finish in the Critérium de Saint-Cloud. At age three, he won the Group 2 Prix Greffulhe, then run at Longchamp Racecourse in Paris where he also ran third in the Group 1 Prix Lupin and fourth in the Prix du Jockey Club. In 1994, Tikkanen also competed in Ireland, Italy, and in Germany where he earned his best result with a third-place finish in the Group 3 Fürstenberg-Rennen at Baden-Baden.

Sent to the United States in the fall, under jockey Cash Asmussen, who had ridden the colt in France, Tikkanen won the Grade I Turf Classic Invitational at Belmont Park. Despite this important win, in the ensuing Breeders' Cup Turf at Churchill Downs he was sent off as a 16-1 longshot. Tikkanen was up against one of the strongest international fields in the race's history which included the heavy betting favorite Paradise Creek as well as top runners such as Fraise, Hatoof, Hernando, Volochine, Raintrap plus Celtic Arms who had won that year's Prix du Jockey Club and Prix Lupin and had defeated Tikkanen in both races. Ridden by future U.S. Racing Hall of Fame jockey Mike Smith, in the homestretch Tikkanen overtook the front-running Paradise Creek and won the 1½ mile race in track record time.

Racing in 1995 at age four, Tikkanen made seven starts with his best performance a second-place finish in the Group 2 Jockey Club Stakes at England's Newmarket Racecourse.

== Stud career ==
Retired to stud duty, he has stood at Glebe House Stud in Ireland and in 2007 stood at Wood Farm Stud near Telford, Shropshire in England. His progeny have met with modest success.
