= 1990 King George VI and Queen Elizabeth Stakes =

40th King George VI and Queen Elizabeth Stakes
- King George VI and Queen Elizabeth Stakes
- Location: Ascot Racecourse
- Date: 28 July 1990
- Winning horse: Belmez (USA)
- Jockey: Mick Kinane
- Trainer: Henry Cecil (GB)
- Owner: Sheikh Mohammed

The 1990 King George VI and Queen Elizabeth Stakes was a horse race held at Ascot Racecourse on Saturday 28 July 1990. It was the 40th running of the King George VI and Queen Elizabeth Stakes.

The winner was Sheikh Mohammed's Belmez, a three-year-old bay colt trained at Newmarket, Suffolk by Henry Cecil and ridden by Mick Kinane. Belmez's victory gave his owner, trainer and jockey their first win in the race.

== The contenders ==
The race attracted a field of eleven runners, ten trained in the United Kingdom and one trained in France. The only French challenger was the favourite In The Wings, the winner of the Coronation Cup and the Grand Prix de Saint-Cloud. In The Wings' owner, Sheikh Mohammed, was represented by two runners trained in England by Henry Cecil: Old Vic, the winner of the Prix du Jockey Club and Irish Derby in 1989 and Belmez, the winner of the Chester Vase. Other leading contenders were Cacoethes, who had been narrowly beaten by Nashwan in the previous year's King George who was accompanied by his pacemaker Limeburn and Terimon, who had finished second in the 1989 Epsom Derby and won the Earl of Sefton Stakes. The other runners included Sapience (Ebor Handicap, Princess of Wales's Stakes), Assatis (Gran Premio del Jockey Club, Hardwicke Stakes) and Legal Case (Champion Stakes). In The Wings headed the betting at odds of 3/1 ahead of Old Vic (4/1) and Cacoethes (11/2) with Belmez and Terimon on 15/2.

== The race ==
Old Vic was sent into the lead by his jockey Steve Cauthen and set the pace from Limeburn. He maintained his advantage into the straight where he led from Belmez, Cacoethes, Assatis and In The Wings. Belmez took the lead with two furlongs to run but Old Vic rallied on the inside and the closing stages developed into a prolonged struggle between the two Henry-Cecil trained colts. Belmez prevailed by a neck, with Assatis finishing strongly to take third, a length and a half behind Old Vic. Cacoethes finished fourth ahead of In The Wings, Terimon and Charmer. There were long gaps back to Husyan and Sapience, with Legal Case and Limeburn bringing up the rear.

== Race details ==
- Sponsor: De Beers
- Purse: £464,025; First prize: £284,715
- Surface: Turf
- Going: Good to Firm
- Distance: 12 furlongs
- Number of runners: 11
- Winner's time: 2:30.76

== Full result ==
Pos.	Marg.	Horse (bred)	Age	Jockey	Trainer (Country)	Odds
1		Belmez (USA)	3	Mick Kinane	Henry Cecil (GB)	15/2
2	nk	Old Vic (GB)	4	Steve Cauthen	Henry Cecil (GB)	4/1
3	1½	Assatis (USA)	5	M. Shibata	Guy Harwood (GB)	16/1
4	5	Cacoethes (USA)	4	Ray Cochrane	Guy Harwood (GB)	11/2
5	1	In The Wings (GB)	4	Cash Asmussen	André Fabre (FR)	3/1 fav
6	1½	Terimon (GB)	4	Michael Roberts	Clive Brittain (GB)	15/2
7	nk	Charmer (IRE)	5	Walter Swinburn	Clive Brittain (GB)	25/1
8	15	Husyan (USA)	4	Willie Carson	Peter Walwyn (GB)	16/1
9	10	Sapience (IRE)	4	Pat Eddery	Jimmy Fitzgerald (GB)	10/1
10	hd	Legal Case (IRE)	4	Frankie Dettori	Luca Cumani (GB)	14/1
11		Limeburn (GB)	4	Tony McGlone	Guy Harwood (GB)	200/1

- Abbreviations: nse = nose; nk = neck; shd = head; hd = head; dist = distance; UR = unseated rider

== Winner's details ==
Further details of the winner, Belmez

- Sex: Colt
- Foaled: 11 January 1987
- Country: United States
- Sire: El Gran Senor; Dam: Grace Note (Top Ville)
- Owner: Sheikh Mohammed
- Breeder: Darley Stud
