= 2004 King George VI and Queen Elizabeth Stakes =

54th King George VI and Queen Elizabeth Stakes
- King George VI and Queen Elizabeth Stakes
- Location: Ascot Racecourse
- Date: 24 July 2004
- Winning horse: Doyen (IRE)
- Jockey: Frankie Dettori
- Trainer: Saeed bin Suroor (GB)
- Owner: Godolphin

The 2004 King George VI and Queen Elizabeth Stakes was a horse race held at Ascot Racecourse on Saturday 24 July 2004. It was the 54th King George VI and Queen Elizabeth Stakes.

The winner was Godolphin's Doyen, a four-year-old bay colt trained at Newmarket, Suffolk by Saeed bin Suroor and ridden by Frankie Dettori. Doyen's victory was the fifth for bin Suroor after Lammtarra (1995), Swain (1997, 1998) and Daylami (1999), the fourth for Godolphin and the third for Dettori. In addition, Godolphin's leader Sheikh Mohammed, had won the race with Belmez (1990), Opera House (1993) and King's Theatre (1994).

== The race ==
The race attracted a field of eleven runners from the United Kingdom, France, Ireland and the United States. Doyen, previously trained in France by André Fabre was made favourite after a six-length win in the Hardwicke Stakes at Royal Ascot in June, and was accompanied by his stable companion Lunar Sovereign, who ran as a pacemaker. The third Godolphin runner was Sulamani, the winner of the Prix du Jockey Club, Dubai Sheema Classic and Arlington Million. France was represented by the filly Vallee Enchantee, the winner of the Hong Kong Vase. The race also feature a rare North American challenger in the form of Hard Buck, a Brazilian-bred five-year-old whose wins included the Gulfstream Park Turf Handicap. The only three-year-old in the field was the Irish-trained Tycoon, who had finished third to Grey Swallow in the Irish Derby. The British runners included the Grand Prix de Saint-Cloud winner Gamut and Warrsan, who had defeated Doyen in the Coronation Cup. Doyen headed the betting at odds of 11/10 ahead of Vallee Enchantee (6/1), Warrsan (13/2) and Sulamani (7/1).

As expected, the pacemaker Lunar Sovereign took the lead and set a steady pace from Hard Buck, Warrsan and Phoenix Reach. with Doyen settling in fifth place. Ted Durcan on Lunar Sovereign quickened the pace at half-way and went clear of the field but began to tire in the straight and was overtaken by Hard Buck two furlongs from the finish. Frankie Dettori produced Doyen on the outside to gain the lead from the American challenger a few strides later and quickly went clear of the field. Doyen won by three lengths from Hard Buck, who held off the fast-finishing Sulamani by a head for second place. Gamut, Vallee Enchantee and Tycoon filled the next three places.

== Race details ==
- Sponsor: De Beers
- Purse: £750,000; First prize: £435,000
- Surface: Turf
- Going: Good to Firm
- Distance: 12 furlongs
- Number of runners: 11
- Winner's time: 2:33.18

== Full result ==
| Pos. | Marg. | Horse (bred) | Age | Jockey | Trainer (Country) | Odds |
|---|---|---|---|---|---|---|
| 1 | | Doyen (IRE) | 4 | Frankie Dettori | Saeed bin Suroor (GB) | 11/10 fav |
| 2 | 3 | Hard Buck (BRZ) | 5 | Gary Stevens | Kenneth McPeek (USA) | 33/1 |
| 3 | hd | Sulamani (IRE) | 5 | Kerrin McEvoy | Saeed bin Suroor (GB) | 7/1 |
| 4 | 1¾ | Gamut (IRE) | 5 | Johnny Murtagh | Michael Stoute (GB) | 12/1 |
| 5 | 1 | Vallee Enchantee (IRE) | 4 | Olivier Peslier | Élie Lellouche (FR) | 6/1 |
| 6 | ¾ | Tycoon (GB) | 3 | Jamie Spencer | Aidan O'Brien (IRE) | 16/1 |
| 7 | nk | Bandari (IRE) | 5 | Richard Hills | Mark Johnston (GB) | 12/1 |
| 8 | 2 | High Accolade (GB) | 4 | Johnny Murtagh | Marcus Tregoning (GB) | 25/1 |
| 9 | 1¼ | Warrsan (IRE) | 6 | Darryll Holland | Clive Brittain (GB) | 13/2 |
| 10 | 2½ | Phoenix Reach (IRE) | 4 | Martin Dwyer | Andrew Balding (GB) | 33/1 |
| 11 | dist | Lunar Sovereign (USA) | 5 | Ted Durcan | Saeed bin Suroor (GB) | 100/1 |

- Abbreviations: nse = nose; nk = neck; shd = head; hd = head; dist = distance

== Winner's details ==
Further details of the winner, Doyen

- Sex: Colt
- Foaled: 22 April 2000
- Country: Ireland
- Sire: Sadler's Wells; Dam: Moon Cactus (Kris)
- Owner: Godolphin
- Breeder: Sheikh Mohammed
