= 1993 King George VI and Queen Elizabeth Stakes =

43rd King George VI and Queen Elizabeth Stakes
- King George VI and Queen Elizabeth Stakes
- Location: Ascot Racecourse
- Date: 24 July 1993
- Winning horse: Opera House (GB)
- Jockey: Michael Roberts
- Trainer: Michael Stoute (GB)
- Owner: Sheikh Mohammed

The 1993 King George VI and Queen Elizabeth Stakes was a horse race held at Ascot Racecourse on Saturday 24 July 1993. It was the 43rd running of the King George VI and Queen Elizabeth Stakes.

The winner was Sheikh Mohammed's Opera House, a five-year-old bay horse trained at Newmarket, Suffolk by Michael Stoute and ridden by Michael Roberts. Roberts had previously won the race on Mtoto in 1988, whilst Sheikh Mohammed had won with Belmez in 1990. Michael Stoute was also recording his second win in the race after Shergar (1981).

== The race ==
The race attracted a field of ten runners: eight from the United Kingdom, one from Ireland and one from Germany. The favourite for the race was the undefeated three-year-old colt Commander in Chief who had won both the Epsom Derby and the Irish Derby. The Irish contender was Desert Team, a three-year-old colt who had won the Princess of Wales's Stakes, whilst Germany was represented by Platini, whose wins included the Grosser Preis von Berlin and the Gran Premio di Milano. The other leading contenders included the four-year-old filly User Friendly who had been named European Horse of the Year for 1992, Tenby, the beaten favourite for the Epsom Derby, White Muzzle, winner of his last five races including the Derby Italiano and Opera House, the five-year-old winner of the Coronation Cup and the Eclipse Stakes and the Hardwicke Stakes winner Jeune (later to win the Melbourne Cup). Commander in Chief headed the betting at odds of 7/4 ahead of User Friendly (11/4), with Opera House and Tenby on 8/1 and White Muzzle at 9/1.

User Friendly took the early lead from Tenby, Desert Team, Commander in Chief, Drum Taps and Tenby. User Friendly maintained her advantage into the straight, where she led from Drum Taps and Commander in Chief, with Opera House moving up to challenge on the outside. Commander in Chief briefly took the advantage but was overtaken by Opera House with two furlongs left to run as White Muzzle came with a strong run on the outside. Opera House maintained his advantage to win by one and a half lengths with White Muzzle getting the better of Commander in Chief by a short head for second place. There was a gap of ten lengths back to User Friendly who finished fourth ahead of Drum Taps, Environment Friend, Desert Team and Tenby, with Jeune and Platini bringing up the rear.

== Race details ==
- Sponsor: De Beers
- Purse: £438,882; First prize: £270,259
- Surface: Turf
- Going: Good
- Distance: 12 furlongs
- Number of runners: 10
- Winner's time: 2:33.94

== Full result ==
Pos.	Marg.	Horse (bred)	Age	Jockey	Trainer (Country)	Odds
1		Opera House (GB)	5	Michael Roberts	Michael Stoute (GB)	8/1
2	1½	White Muzzle (GB)	3	John Reid	Peter Chapple-Hyam (GB)	9/1
3	shd	Commander in Chief (GB)	3	Pat Eddery	Henry Cecil (GB)	7/4 fav
4	10	User Friendly (GB)	4	George Duffield	Clive Brittain (GB)	11/4
5	nk	Drum Taps (USA)	7	Frankie Dettori	Lord Huntingdon (GB)	20/1
6	1½	Environment Friend (GB)	5	Paul Eddery	N. Wright (GB)	40/1
7	2½	Desert Team (USA)	3	Christy Roche	Jim Bolger (IRE)	66/1
8	½	Tenby (GB)	3	Willie Carson	Henry Cecil (GB)	8/1
9	2½	Jeune (GB)	4	Ray Cochrane	Geoff Wragg (GB)	50/1
10	4	Platini (GER)	4	Mark Rimmer	Bruno Schütz (GER)	14/1

- Abbreviations: nse = nose; nk = neck; shd = head; hd = head; dist = distance; UR = unseated rider

== Winner's details ==
Further details of the winner, Opera House

- Sex: Stallion
- Foaled: 24 February 1988
- Country: United Kingdom
- Sire: Sadler's Wells; Dam: Colorpin (High Top)
- Owner: Sheikh Mohammed
- Breeder: Meon Valley Stud
