= 1992 King George VI and Queen Elizabeth Stakes =

42nd King George VI and Queen Elizabeth Stakes
- King George VI and Queen Elizabeth Stakes
- Location: Ascot Racecourse
- Date: 25 July 1992
- Winning horse: St Jovite (USA)
- Jockey: Stephen Craine
- Trainer: Jim Bolger (IRE)
- Owner: Virginia Kraft Payson

The 1992 King George VI and Queen Elizabeth Stakes was a horse race held at Ascot Racecourse on Saturday 25 July 1992. It was the 42nd running of the King George VI and Queen Elizabeth Stakes.

The winner was Virginia Kraft Payson's St Jovite, a three-year-old bay colt trained in Ireland by Jim Bolger and ridden by Stephen Craine. St Jovite's victory gave his owner, trainer and jockey their first win in the race and was the first for a horse trained in Ireland since The Minstrel in 1977.

== The race ==
The race attracted a field of eight runners: seven from the United Kingdom and one from Ireland. There were no challengers from continental Europe. The Irish-trained contender was St Jovite, who had finished second in the Epsom Derby before winning the Irish Derby by twelve lengths in record time. Michael Stoute's Newmarket stable sent three runners: the Coronation Cup winner Saddler's Hall, the Brigadier Gerard Stakes winner Opera House and the five-year-old Rock Hopper, twice winner of the Hardwicke Stakes and runner-up to Generous in the 1991 King George. The other contenders were Silver Wisp (third in the Epsom Derby), Jeune (Predominate Stakes, later to win the Melbourne Cup), Sapience (Ebor Handicap, Princess of Wales's Stakes, Jockey Club Stakes) and Terimon (1991 International Stakes). St Jovite headed the betting at odds of 4/5 ahead of Saddler's Hall (7/2), Silver Wisp (8/1) and Jeune (10/1).

Craine sent St Jovite into the lead from the start and set the pace from Sapience, Opera House and Saddler's Hall. Opera House moved up in to second place at half way, but St Jovite maintained his advantage and led the field into the straight from Opera House, Sapience, Jeune and Saddler's Hall. St Jovite was never in danger of defeat, accelerating clear of his opponents in the last quarter mile to win by six lengths. Saddler's Hall took second place, just ahead of Opera House, Sapience and Rock Hopper. There was a gap of eight lengths back to Terimon, who finished ahead of Silver Wisp, with Jeune in last place

== Race details ==
- Sponsor: De Beers
- Purse: £424,160; First prize: £261,216
- Surface: Turf
- Going: Good to Firm
- Distance: 12 furlongs
- Number of runners: 8
- Winner's time: 2:30.85

== Full result ==
Pos.	Marg.	Horse (bred)	Age	Jockey	Trainer (Country)	Odds
1		St Jovite (USA)	3	Stephen Craine	Jim Bolger (IRE)	4/5 fav
2	6	Saddlers' Hall (IRE)	4	Willie Carson	Michael Stoute (GB)	7/2
3	½	Opera House (GB)	5	Steve Cauthen	Michael Stoute (GB)	14/1
4	½	Sapience (IRE)	6	Ray Cochrane	David Elsworth (GB)	16/1
5	hd	Rock Hopper (GB)	5	Walter Swinburn	Michael Stoute (GB)	22/1
6	8	Terimon (GB)	6	Michael Roberts	Clive Brittain (GB)	33/1
7	¾	Silver Wisp (USA)	3	Paul Eddery	Geoff Lewis (GB)	8/1
8	¾	Jeune (GB)	3	Michael Hills	Geoff Wragg (GB)	10/1

- Abbreviations: nse = nose; nk = neck; shd = head; hd = head; dist = distance; UR = unseated rider

== Winner's details ==
Further details of the winner, St Jovite

- Sex: Colt
- Foaled: 11 March 1989
- Country: United States
- Sire: Pleasant Colony; Dam: Northern Sunset (Northfields)
- Owner: Virginia Kraft Payson
- Breeder: Virginia Kraft Payson
