= 2000 King George VI and Queen Elizabeth Stakes =

50th King George VI and Queen Elizabeth Stakes
- King George VI and Queen Elizabeth Stakes
- Location: Ascot Racecourse
- Date: 29 July 2000
- Winning horse: Montjeu (IRE)
- Jockey: Mick Kinane
- Trainer: John Hammond (FR)
- Owner: Michael Tabor

The 2000 King George VI and Queen Elizabeth Stakes was a horse race held at Ascot Racecourse on Saturday 29 July 2000. It was the 50th running of the King George VI and Queen Elizabeth Stakes.

The winner was Michael Tabor's Montjeu, a four-year-old bay colt trained in France by John Hammond and ridden by Mick Kinane. Montjeu's victory was the first in the race for Hammond and Tabor and the third for Kinane after Belmez (1990) and King's Theatre (1994).

== The race ==
The race attracted a field of seven runners: four from the United Kingdom, and one each from France, Ireland and Japan. Favourite for the race was the Irish-bred French-trained Montjeu, who was the European champion three-year-old in 1999 when his victories included the Prix du Jockey Club, Irish Derby and Prix de l'Arc de Triomphe. In the early part of 2000 he had added further Group One victories in the Tattersalls Gold Cup and the Grand Prix de Saint-Cloud. The British-trained runners were the Godolphin stable's Fantastic Light, winner of the Dubai Sheema Classic, the Coronation Cup winner Daliapour, the 1999 Tattersalls Gold Cup winner Shiva (a Japanese-bred mare trained by Henry Cecil and Beat All, a Michael Stoute-trained four year old who had finished third behind Oath and Daliapour in the 1999 Epsom Derby. The Irish challenger was the Aga Khan's Raypour, a 100/1 outsider, acting as a pacemaker (running) for Daliapour. Japan was represented by Air Shakur, a three-year-old colt who had won the Satsuki Shō before being narrowly beaten in the Japanese Derby. Montjeu headed the betting at odds of 1/3 ahead of Daliapour (13/2), Air Shakur (10/1) and Fantastic Light (12/1).

Raypour took an early lead and set the pace from Daliapour, Shiva and Beat All with Air Shakur, Fantastic Light and Montjeu towards the rear of the field. Daliapour overtook his pacemaker three furlongs from the finish and led the field into the straight from Raypour, Beat All and Shiva with Montjeu and Fantastic Light making progress. Montjeu moved up on the outside to take lead approaching the final furlong and won very easily by one and three quarter lengths from Fantastic Light who stayed on to beat Daliapour by three and a half lengths for second place. The next three place were filled by Beat All, Air Shakur and Raypour with Shiva finishing last after being eased down in the final furlong.

== Race details ==
- Sponsor: De Beers
- Purse: £750,000; First prize: £435,000
- Surface: Turf
- Going: Good to Firm
- Distance: 12 furlongs
- Number of runners: 7
- Winner's time: 2:29.98

== Full result ==
Pos.	Marg.	Horse (bred)	Age	Jockey	Trainer (Country)	Odds
1		Montjeu (IRE)	4	Mick Kinane	John Hammond (FR)	1/3 fav
2	1¾	Fantastic Light (USA)	4	John Reid	Saeed bin Suroor (GB)	12/1
3	3½	Daliapour (IRE)	4	Johnny Murtagh	Michael Stoute (GB)	13/2
4	1	Beat All (USA)	4	Kevin Darley	Michael Stoute (GB)	33/1
5	2	Air Shakur (JPN)	3	Yutaka Take	Hideyuki Mori (JPN)	10/1
6	8	Raypour (IRE)	3	Jimmy Fortune	John Oxx (IRE)	100/1
7	14	Shiva (JPN)	5	Richard Quinn	Henry Cecil (GB)	14/1

- Abbreviations: nse = nose; nk = neck; shd = head; hd = head; dist = distance

== Winner's details ==
Further details of the winner, Montjeu

- Sex: Colt
- Foaled: 4 April 1996
- Country: Ireland
- Sire: Sadler's Wells; Dam: Floripedes (Top Ville)
- Owner: Michael Tabor
- Breeder: James Goldsmith
