= 2001 King George VI and Queen Elizabeth Stakes =

51st King George VI and Queen Elizabeth Stakes
- King George VI and Queen Elizabeth Stakes
- Location: Ascot Racecourse
- Date: 28 July 2001
- Winning horse: Galileo (IRE)
- Jockey: Mick Kinane
- Trainer: Aidan O'Brien (IRE)
- Owner: Susan Magnier & Michael Tabor

The 2001 King George VI and Queen Elizabeth Stakes was a horse race held at Ascot Racecourse on Saturday 28 July 2001. It was the 51st running of the King George VI and Queen Elizabeth Stakes.

The winner was Susan Magnier and Michael Tabor's Galileo, a three-year-old bay colt trained at Ballydoyle by Aidan O'Brien and ridden by Mick Kinane. Galileo's victory was the first in the race for O'Brien and fourth for Kinane after Belmez (1990), King's Theatre (1994) and Montjeu (2000). Michael Tabor had previously won the race with Montjeu.

== The race ==
The race attracted a field of twelve runners: seven from the United Kingdom, three from Ireland and two from France. Favourite for the race was the undefeated Irish colt Galileo who had won the Epsom Derby and the Irish Derby and was accompanied by his pacemaker Ice Dancer. The Godolphin stable were represented by the five-year-old Fantastic Light, the winner of the Man o' War Stakes, Tattersalls Gold Cup and Prince of Wales's Stakes, as well as his pacemaker Give The Slip a high-class stayer who had won the Ebor Handicap and the Dubai City of Gold. The French challengers were the Prix du Jockey Club winner Anabaa Blue and the four-year-old Hightori who had won the Prix du Prince d'Orange and finished third in the Dubai World Cup. The other runners included the St Leger Stakes winner Millenary and Storming Home who had won the King Edward VII Stakes at Royal Ascot. Galileo headed the betting at odds of 1/2 ahead of Fantastic Light (7/2). Anabaa Blue (18/1) was the only other runner to start at odds of less than 20/1 reflecting the view that the race was effectively a match between the representatives of Ballydoyle and Godolphin.

Give The Slip took the lead from the tart and set the pace from Ice Dancer, with Ababaa Blue, Golden Snake and Mutamam just behind. Give The Slip maintained his advantage into the straight where Mick Kinane produced Galileo with a run on the inside to take the lead approaching the final quarter mile. Fantastic Light made rapid progress on the outside and caught the favourite a furlong from the finish, but Galileo rallied and pulled away again in the closing stages to win by two lengths. Hightori, who had been badly hampered by the fading Give The Slip, finished strongly to take third by a short head from Storming Home, with Millenary in fifth place.

== Race details ==
- Sponsor: De Beers
- Purse: £750,000; First prize: £435,000
- Surface: Turf
- Going: Good to Firm
- Distance: 12 furlongs
- Number of runners: 12
- Winner's time: 2:27.71

== Full result ==
Pos.	Marg.	Horse (bred)	Age	Jockey	Trainer (Country)	Odds
1		Galileo (IRE)	3	Mick Kinane	Aidan O'Brien (IRE)	1/2 fav
2	2	Fantastic Light (USA)	5	Frankie Dettori	Saeed bin Suroor (GB)	7/2
3	1	Hightori (FR)	4	Gerald Mosse	Philippe Demercastel (FR)	22/1
4	shd	Storming Home (GB)	3	Michael Hills	Barry Hills (GB)	25/1
5	3	Millenary (GB)	4	Kieren Fallon	John Dunlop (GB)	25/1
6	8	Golden Snake (USA)	5	Pat Eddery	John Dunlop (GB)	25/1
7	1½	Anabaa Blue (GB)	3	Christophe Soumillon	Carlos Lerner (FR)	18/1
8	shd	Morshdi (GB)	3	Philip Robinson	Michael Jarvis (GB)	25/1
9	2	Mutamam (GB)	6	Richard Hills	Alec Stewart (GB)	20/1
10	2½	Chimes At Midnight (USA)	4	Wayne Smith	Luke Comer (IRE)	200/1
11	2½	Give The Slip (GB)	4	Daragh O'Donohoe	Saeed bin Suroor (GB)	66/1
12	7	Ice Dancer (IRE)	3	Paul Scallan	Aidan O'Brien (IRE)	200/1

- Abbreviations: nse = nose; nk = neck; shd = head; hd = head; dist = distance

== Winner's details ==
Further details of the winner, Galileo

- Sex: Colt
- Foaled: 30 March 1998
- Country: Ireland
- Sire: Sadler's Wells; Dam: Urban Sea (Miswaki)
- Owner: Susan Magnier & Michael Tabor
- Breeder: David Tsui and Orpendale
