= 1999 King George VI and Queen Elizabeth Stakes =

49th King George VI and Queen Elizabeth Stakes
- King George VI and Queen Elizabeth Stakes
- Location: Ascot Racecourse
- Date: 24 July 1999
- Winning horse: Daylami (IRE)
- Jockey: Frankie Dettori
- Trainer: Saeed bin Suroor (GB)
- Owner: Godolphin

The 1999 King George VI and Queen Elizabeth Stakes was a horse race held at Ascot Racecourse on Saturday 24 July 1999. It was the 49th running of the King George VI and Queen Elizabeth Stakes.

The winner was Godolphin's Daylami, a five-year-old grey horse trained at Newmarket, Suffolk by Saeed bin Suroor and ridden by Frankie Dettori. Daylami's victory was the fourth in the race for bin Suroor and the third for Dettori and Godolphin. In addition, Godolphin's leader Sheikh Mohammed, had won the race with Belmez (1990), Opera House (1993) and King's Theatre (1994).

== The race ==
The race attracted a field of eight runners: six from the United Kingdom, and one each from Ireland and Hong Kong. Favourite for the race was the Henry Cecil-trained Oath, the winner of the Epsom Derby. The Godolphin stable fielded two runners, the five-year-old Daylami, originally trained in France, whose wins included the Poule d'Essai des Poulains, Eclipse Stakes, Man o' War Stakes and the Coronation Cup and the four-year-old Nedawi, winner of the 1998 St Leger Stakes. The other British-trained runners were Fruits of Love (Dubai Sheema Classic, Hardwicke Stakes)), Daliapour (runner-up to Oath in the Epsom Derby and to Montjeu in the Irish Derby) and Silver Patriarch, (1997 St Leger, Gran Premio del Jockey Club, Coronation Cup). The international contingent consisted of the Hong Kong Horse of the Year Indigenous and the Irish colt Sunshine Street. Oath headed the betting at odds of 9/4 ahead of Daylami (3/1) and Fruits of Love (4/1) with Daliapour and Nedawi on 8/1.

Daliapour took the early lead and set the pace from Nedawi, Daylami and Oath. Nedawi moved to the front and led the field into the straight ahead of Daliapour, Oath and Silver Patriarch as Daylami was switched to the outside by Dettori and began to make rapid progress. Daylami overtook Nedawi approaching the final furlong and quickly went clear of his opponents to win by five lengths. Nedawi held off the fast-finishing Fruits of Love by half a length to take second with Silver Patriarch, Sunshine Street and Indigenous filling the next three places. Oath and Daliapour, the only three-year-olds in the race, came home seventh and eighth, both having sustained injuries.

== Race details ==
- Sponsor: De Beers
- Purse: £564,000; First prize: £342,000
- Surface: Turf
- Going: Good to Firm
- Distance: 12 furlongs
- Number of runners: 8
- Winner's time: 2:29.35

== Full result ==
| Pos. | Marg. | Horse (bred) | Age | Jockey | Trainer (Country) | Odds |
|---|---|---|---|---|---|---|
| 1 | | Daylami (IRE) | 5 | Frankie Dettori | Saeed bin Suroor (GB) | 3/1 |
| 2 | 5 | Nedawi (GB) | 4 | Gary Stevens | Saeed bin Suroor (GB) | 8/1 |
| 3 | ½ | Fruits of Love (USA) | 4 | Olivier Peslier | Mark Johnston (GB) | 4/1 |
| 4 | 2½ | Silver Patriarch (IRE) | 5 | Richard Quinn | John Dunlop (GB) | 10/1 |
| 5 | 1½ | Sunshine Street (USA) | 4 | Johnny Murtagh | Noel Meade (IRE) | 25/1 |
| 6 | ½ | Indigenous (IRE) | 6 | Cash Asmussen | Ivan Allan (HK) | 20/1 |
| 7 | 1¼ | Oath (IRE) | 3 | Kieren Fallon | Henry Cecil (GB) | 9/4 fav |
| 8 | 5 | Daliapour (IRE) | 3 | Gerald Mosse | Luca Cumani (GB) | 8/1 |

- Abbreviations: nse = nose; nk = neck; shd = head; hd = head; dist = distance

== Winner's details ==
Further details of the winner, Daylami

- Sex: Stallion
- Foaled: 20 April 1994
- Country: Ireland
- Sire: Doyoun; Dam: Daltawa (Miswaki)
- Owner: Godolphin
- Breeder: Aga Khan IV
