= 1988 King George VI and Queen Elizabeth Stakes =

Royal horse racing, held in 1988

38th King George VI and Queen Elizabeth Stakes
- King George VI and Queen Elizabeth Stakes
- Location: Ascot Racecourse
- Date: 23 July 1988
- Winning horse: Mtoto (GB)
- Jockey: Michael Roberts
- Trainer: Alec Stewart (GB)
- Owner: Ahmed Al Maktoum

The 1988 King George VI and Queen Elizabeth Stakes was a horse race held at Ascot Racecourse on Saturday 23 July 1988. It was the 38th running of the King George VI and Queen Elizabeth Stakes.

The winner was Ahmed Al Maktoum's Mtoto, a five-year-old bay horse trained at Newmarket, Suffolk by Alec Stewart and ridden by the South African jockey Michael Roberts. Mtoto's victory was the first in the race for his owner, trainer and jockey. Mtoto was the first five-year-old to win the race since Park Top in 1969.

== The contenders ==
The race attracted a field of ten runners, seven trained in the United Kingdom, two from France and one from Italy. The favourite was Unfuwain, a three-year-old colt who had won who had won the Chester Vase by eight lengths and the Princess of Wales's Stakes against older horses by fifteen lengths. The French challengers, Silver Lane and Soft Machine, were not regarded as serious contenders but the Italian runner was the formidable Tony Bin, the winner of the Premio Presidente della Repubblica (twice), the Gran Premio di Milano (twice) and the Gran Premio del Jockey Club. The other major contenders were Mtoto, twice winner of both the Prince of Wales's Stakes and the Eclipse Stakes, Doyoun, winner of the 2000 Guineas and Glacial Storm, runner-up in the Epsom Derby. The Sussex stable of John Dunlop had two representatives, the 1986 St Leger Stakes winner Moon Madness and Almaarad who had won the Hardwicke Stakes at Royal Ascot. The other runner was the filly Percy's Lass, later to become the dam of the Epsom Derby winner Sir Percy. Unfuwain headed the betting at odds of 2/1 ahead of Mtoto (4/1), Tony Bin (9/2) and Glacial Storm (6/1).

== The race ==
Glacial Storm took the early lead and set the pace from Moon Madness and Unfuwain with Doyoun, Soft Machine and Silver Lane close behind whilst Mtoto was restrained in last place. Moon Madness took the lead with five furlong left to run but was overtaken on the turn into the straight by Unfuwain. With a quarter of a mile left to run Unfuwain still held the advantage, but Doyoun was still in contention whilst Tony Bin, Percy's Lass, Almaarad and (on the far outside) Mtoto were all emerging a challengers. Mtoto overtook Unfuwain a furlong from the finish and ran on in the closing stages to beat the favourite by two lengths. Tony Bin was a length and half back in third ahead of Almaarad, Percy's Lass and Doyoun. Soft Machine, Glacial Storm and Silver Lane came next with Moon Madness finishing last.

== Race details ==
- Sponsor: De Beers
- Purse: £356,280; First prize: £218,808
- Surface: Turf
- Going: Good to Soft
- Distance: 12 furlongs
- Number of runners: 10
- Winner's time: 2:37.33

== Full result ==
Pos.	Marg.	Horse (bred)	Age	Jockey	Trainer (Country)	Odds
1		Mtoto (GB)	5	Michael Roberts	Alec Stewart (GB)	4/1
2	2	Unfuwain (USA)	3	Willie Carson	Dick Hern (GB)	2/1 fav
3	1½	Tony Bin (IRE)	5	Pat Eddery	Luigi Camici (ITY)	9/2
4	1½	Almaarad (IRE)	4	Steve Cauthen	John Dunlop (GB)	10/1
5	3	Percy's Lass (GB)	4	Paul Eddery	Geoff Wragg (GB)	66/1
6	1½	Doyoun (GB)	3	Walter Swinburn	Michael Stoute (GB)	7/1
7	2½	Soft Machine (USA)	3	Dominique Boeuf	P. Rago (FR)	200/1
8	5	Glacial Storm (USA)	3	Michael Hills	Barry Hills (GB)	6/1
9		Silver Lane (USA)	3	Tony Cruz	Maurice Zilber (FR)	33/1
10		Moon Madness (GB)	5	Tony Ives	John Dunlop (GB)	50/1

- Abbreviations: nse = nose; nk = neck; shd = head; hd = head; dist = distance; UR = unseated rider

== Winner's details ==
Further details of the winner, Mtoto

- Sex: Stallion
- Foaled: 1 April 1983
- Country: United Kingdom
- Sire: Busted; Dam: Amazer (Mincio)
- Owner: Ahmed Al Maktoum
- Breeder: John L. Moore
