= 2003 King George VI and Queen Elizabeth Stakes =

53rd King George VI and Queen Elizabeth Stakes
- King George VI and Queen Elizabeth Stakes
- Location: Ascot Racecourse
- Date: 26 July 2003
- Winning horse: Alamshar (IRE)
- Jockey: Johnny Murtagh
- Trainer: John Oxx (IRE)
- Owner: Aga Khan

The 2003 King George VI and Queen Elizabeth Stakes was a horse race held at Ascot Racecourse on Saturday 26 July 2003. It was the 53rd King George VI and Queen Elizabeth Stakes.

The winner was Aga Khan's Alamshar, a three-year-old bay colt trained in Ireland by John Oxx and ridden by Johnny Murtagh. Alamshar's victory was the first in the race for his jockey and trainer and the second for the Aga Khan after Shergar (1981).

== The race ==
The race attracted a field of twelve runners: ten from the United Kingdom, one from Ireland and one from South Africa. There were no challengers from continental Europe. The Godolphin stable fielded three runners: Sulamani, the winner of the Prix du Jockey Club and the Dubai Sheema Classic, Leadership the winner of the Gran Premio di Milano and Grandera the winner of the Singapore Airlines International Cup, Prince of Wales's Stakes and Irish Champion Stakes. The other British trained runners included Nayef (Champion Stakes, Dubai Sheema Classic, International Stakes, Prince of Wales's Stakes), Kris Kin (Epsom Derby), Falbrav (Japan Cup, Eclipse Stakes), Warrsan (Coronation Cup) and the St Leger Stakes winners Millenary and Bollin Eric. The South African trainer Mike de Kock sent Victory Moon, a horse who had been campaigned successfully in Dubai, winning the UAE Derby. The only Irish runner was Alamshar who had finished third to Kris Kin in the Epom Derby before defeating Dalakhani in the Irish Derby at the Curragh. Nayef headed the betting at odds of 3/1 ahead of Kris Kin (7/2), Sulamani (9/2) and Alamshar (13/2).

Izdiham, who was acting as a pacemaker for Nayef, took the early lead with Alamshar racing in second. Nayef, Bollin Eric, Victory Moon and Leadership were just behind while Falbrav raced apart from the others on the far side of the course. Alamshar overtook the pacemaker on the turn into the straight and quickly opened up a clear advantage. The Irish colt was never seriously challenged and won by three and a half length from the fast-finishing Sulamani with Kris Kin two lengths back in third. The next three places were filled by Bollin Eric, Falbrav and Warrsan.

== Race details ==
- Sponsor: De Beers
- Purse: £750,000; First prize: £435,000
- Surface: Turf
- Going: Good
- Distance: 12 furlongs
- Number of runners: 12
- Winner's time: 2:33.26

== Full result ==
Pos.	Marg.	Horse (bred)	Age	Jockey	Trainer (Country)	Odds
1		Alamshar (IRE)	3	Johnny Murtagh	John Oxx (IRE)	13/2
2	3½	Sulamani (IRE)	4	Kerrin McEvoy	Saeed bin Suroor (GB)	9/2
3	2	Kris Kin (USA)	3	Kieren Fallon	Michael Stoute (GB)	7/2
4	½	Bollin Eric (GB)	4	Kevin Darley	Tim Easterby (GB)	16/1
5	3	Falbrav (IRE)	5	Darryll Holland	Luca Cumani (GB)	12/1
6	½	Warrsan (IRE)	5	Philip Robinson	Clive Brittain (GB)	14/1
7	1½	Nayef (USA)	5	Richard Hills	Marcus Tregoning (GB)	3/1 fav
8	2	Millenary (GB)	6	Pat Eddery	John Dunlop (GB)	16/1
9	4	Izdiham (IRE)	4	Willie Supple	Marcus Tregoning (GB)	200/1
10	hd	Victory Moon (SAF)	4	Wayne Smith	Mike de Kock (SAF)	12/1
11	11	Grandera (IRE)	5	Mick Kinane	Saeed bin Suroor (GB)	33/1
12	6	Leadership (GB)	4	Jamie Spencer	Saeed bin Suroor (GB)	25/1

- Abbreviations: nse = nose; nk = neck; shd = head; hd = head; dist = distance

== Winner's details ==
Further details of the winner, Alamshar

- Sex: Colt
- Foaled: 18 April 2000
- Country: Ireland
- Sire: Key of Luck; Dam: Alaiyda (Shahrastani)
- Owner: Aga Khan
- Breeder: Aga Khan
