= 2008 King George VI and Queen Elizabeth Stakes =

58th King George VI and Queen Elizabeth Stakes
- King George VI and Queen Elizabeth Stakes
- Duke Of Marmalade Papal Bull Youmzain
- Location: Ascot Racecourse
- Date: 26 July 2008
- Winning horse: Duke of Marmalade (IRE)
- Jockey: Johnny Murtagh
- Trainer: Aidan O'Brien (IRE)
- Owner: Susan Magnier & Michael Tabor

The 2008 King George VI and Queen Elizabeth Stakes was a horse race held at Ascot Racecourse on Saturday 26 July 2008. It was the 58th King George VI and Queen Elizabeth Stakes.

The winner was Susan Magnier & Michael Tabor's Duke of Marmalade, a four-year-old bay colt trained at Ballydoyle in Ireland by Aidan O'Brien and ridden by Johnny Murtagh. Duke of Marmalade's victory was the third in the race for his trainer jockey and owners. In addition, Michael Tabor had won the race independently with Montjeu (2000) and Hurricane Run (2006).

== The race ==
The race attracted eight runners with Michael Stoute and Aidan O'Brien fielding two and three runners respectively. The Stoute team consisted of Ask, the winner of the Ormonde Stakes, Cumberland Lodge Stakes and Gordon Richards Stakes and Papal Bull who had won the Princess of Wales's Stakes and the Geoffrey Freer Stakes in 2007. The O'Brien contenders were the Hardwicke Stakes winner Macarthur, Red Rock Canyon who was running as a pacemaker, and the odds-on favourite Duke of Marmalade. The last named was unbeaten in three Group One races that year, having won the Prix Ganay, Tattersalls Gold Cup and Prince of Wales's Stakes. The other runners were the experienced international performer Youmzain (Preis von Europa, Grand Prix de Saint-Cloud runner-up Prix de l'Arc de Triomphe), the 2007 St Leger Stakes winner Lucarno and the 66/1 outsider Petara Bay. There were no challengers from continental Europe. Duke of Marmalade headed the betting at odds of 4/6 ahead of Youmzain (4/1), Lucarno (8/1) and Ask (10/1).

Red Rock Canyon set the pace as expected from Lucarno and Macarthur, with Ask and Duke of Marmalade next and Youmzain and Papal Bull at the rear of the field in the early stages. Red Rock Canyon maintained his lead into the straight when he was overtaken by Duke of Marmalade, but Papal Bull made rapid progress on the outside and took a slight advantage inside the final furlong. Papal Bull and Duke of Marmalade went clear of the rest in the closing stages, with the Irish horse rallying on the inside to regain the lead near the finish and win by a neck. There was a gap of nine lengths back to Youmzain, who took third place by a length from Red Rock Canyon.

== Race details ==
- Sponsor: none
- Purse: £837,215; First prize: £482,545
- Surface: Turf
- Going: Good to Firm
- Distance: 12 furlongs
- Number of runners: 8
- Winner's time: 2:27.91

== Full result ==
Pos.	Marg.	Horse (bred)	Age	Jockey	Trainer (Country)	Odds
1		Duke of Marmalade (IRE)	4	Johnny Murtagh	Aidan O'Brien (IRE)	4/6 fav
2	nk	Papal Bull (GB)	5	Olivier Peslier	Michael Stoute (GB)	14/1
3	9	Youmzain (IRE)	5	Richard Hughes	Mick Channon (GB)	4/1
4	1	Red Rock Canyon (IRE)	4	Colm O'Donoghue	Aidan O'Brien (IRE)	125/1
5	1	Ask (GB)	5	Ryan Moore	Michael Stoute (GB)	10/1
6	3½	Petara Bay (IRE)	4	Jim Crowley	Terry Mills (GB)	66/1
7	nk	Lucarno (USA)	4	Jimmy Fortune	John Gosden (GB)	8/1
8	nk	Macarthur (GB)	4	Seamie Heffernan	Aidan O'Brien (IRE)	14/1

- Abbreviations: nse = nose; nk = neck; shd = head; hd = head

== Winner's details ==
Further details of the winner, Duke of Marmalade

- Sex: Colt
- Foaled: 12 March 2004
- Country: Ireland
- Sire: Danehill; Dam: Love Me True (Kingmambo)
- Owner: Susan Magnier & Michael Tabor
- Breeder: Southern Bloodstock
