= 2007 King George VI and Queen Elizabeth Stakes =

57th King George VI and Queen Elizabeth Stakes
- King George VI and Queen Elizabeth Stakes
- Location: Ascot Racecourse
- Date: 28 July 2007
- Winning horse: Dylan Thomas (IRE)
- Jockey: Johnny Murtagh
- Trainer: Aidan O'Brien (IRE)
- Owner: Susan Magnier and Michael Tabor

The 2007 King George VI and Queen Elizabeth Stakes was a horse race held at Ascot Racecourse on Saturday 28 July 2007. It was the 57th King George VI and Queen Elizabeth Stakes.

The winner was Susan Magnier and Michael Tabor's Dylan Thomas, a four-year-old bay colt trained at Ballydoyle in Ireland by Aidan O'Brien and ridden by Johnny Murtagh. Dylan Thomas's victory was the second in the race for his trainer, jockey and owners. In addition, Michael Tabor had won the race independently with Montjeu (2000) and Hurricane Run (2006).

== The race ==
The race attracted seven runners but no three-year-olds. Aidan O'Brien's Ballydoyle stable were represented by Scorpion, the winner of the 2005 St Leger Stakes and the 2006 Coronation Cup and the favourite Dylan Thomas, whose wins included the Irish Derby, Irish Champion Stakes and Prix Ganay. The only challenger from continental Europe was the German colt Prince Flori, winner of the Grosser Preis von Baden. The Godolphin stable was represented by Laverock, a five-year-old who had won the Prix d'Ispahan and the Gran Premio del Jockey Club in 2006. The three remaining runners, all trained in Britain, were Youmzain, winner of the Preis von Europa and Grand Prix de Saint-Cloud, Maraahel, twice winner of the Hardwicke Stakes and the veteran stayer Sergeant Cecil, whose wins had included the Ebor Handicap, Cesarewitch, Doncaster Cup and Prix du Cadran. Dylan Thomas headed the betting at odds of 5/4 ahead of Scorpion (3/1), Maraahel (6/1) and Prince Flori (10/1).

Scorpion set the pace from Prince Flori in the early stages before Maraahel (who had started poorly) moved into second place after half a mile. Laverock and Dylan Thomas tracked the leaders ahead of Youmzain and Sergeant Cecil. On the turn into the straight Maraahel gained the advantage from Scorpion but was quickly overtaken by Dylan Thomas on the outside. Youmzain finished strongly, but never looked likely to challenge the favourite, who recorded an "impressive" four length victory. Maraahel was a further three and a half lengths back in third, half a length ahead of Laverock.

== Race details ==
- Sponsor: none
- Purse: £738,600; First prize: £425,850
- Surface: Turf
- Going: Good to Soft
- Distance: 12 furlongs
- Number of runners: 7
- Winner's time: 2:31.11

== Full result ==
Pos.	Marg.	Horse (bred)	Age	Jockey	Trainer (Country)	Odds
1		Dylan Thomas (IRE)	4	Johnny Murtagh	Aidan O'Brien (IRE)	5/4 fav
2	4	Youmzain (IRE)	4	Richard Hughes	Mick Channon (GB)	12/1
3	3½	Maraahel (IRE)	6	Richard Hills	Michael Stoute (GB)	6/1
4	½	Laverock (IRE)	5	Frankie Dettori	Saeed bin Suroor (GB)	11/1
5	3	Scorpion (IRE)	5	Mick Kinane	Aidan O'Brien (IRE)	3/1
6	5	Sergeant Cecil (GB)	8	Ryan Moore	Rod Millman (GB)	33/1
7	3½	Prince Flori (GER)	4	Jimmy Fortune	S Smrczek (GER)	10/1

- Abbreviations: nse = nose; nk = neck; shd = head; hd = head

== Winner's details ==
Further details of the winner, Dylan Thomas

- Sex: Colt
- Foaled: 23 April 2003
- Country: Ireland
- Sire: Danehill; Dam: Lagrion (Diesis)
- Owner: Susan Magnier and Michael Tabor
- Breeder: Tower Bloodstock
