= 2010 King George VI and Queen Elizabeth Stakes =

65th King George VI and Queen Elizabeth Stakes
- King George VI and Queen Elizabeth Stakes
- Harbinger Cape Blanco Youmzain
- Location: Ascot Racecourse
- Date: 24 July 2010
- Winning horse: Harbinger (GB)
- Jockey: Olivier Peslier
- Trainer: Michael Stoute (GB)
- Owner: Highclere "Admiral Rous"

The 2010 King George VI and Queen Elizabeth Stakes was a horse race held at Ascot Racecourse on Saturday 24 July 2010. It was the 60th King George VI and Queen Elizabeth Stakes.

The winner was the Highclere "Admiral Rous" syndicate's Harbinger, a four-year-old bay colt trained at Newmarket, Suffolk by Michael Stoute and ridden by Olivier Peslier. Harbinger's victory was the first for his jockey and owner and the fifth for Stoute after Shergar (1981), Opera House (1993) Golan (2002) and Conduit (2009).

== The race ==
Michael Stoute trained three of the six runners for the race, with the Epsom Derby winner Workforce being made the 8/11 favourite and the Joel Stakes winner Confront being employed as a pacemaker. His third runner, Harbinger, had won the John Porter Stakes, Ormonde Stakes and Hardwicke Stakes in 2010 and was made the 4/1 second favourite. Ryan Moore, who had ridden Harbinger in all his previous races, opted to partner Workforce, allowing the French jockey Olivier Peslier to take the ride on the four-year-old. The other runners were Cape Blanco, who had defeated Workforce in the Dante Stakes and subsequently won the Irish Derby, Youmzain, three times runner-up in the Prix de l'Arc de Triomphe and the French filly Daryakana, winner of the Hong Kong Vase.

Confront set a strong pace from Workforce and Cape Blanco, with Harbinger in fourth. When the pacemaker weakened early in the straight Cape Blanco briefly took the lead as Workforce began to struggle, but Peslier produced Harbinger with a strong run on the outside to gain the advantage approaching the final furlong. In the closing stages Harbinger drew away from his opponents to win by eleven lengths in a time of 2:26.78. Both the winning margin and the winning time established new records for the race. Cape Blanco stayed on to take second, three and a quarter lengths ahead of Youmzain, with Daryakana fourth, Workforce fifth and Confront last of the six runners.

== Race details ==
- Sponsor: Betfair
- Purse: £984,700; First prize: £567,700
- Surface: Turf
- Going: Good
- Distance: 12 furlongs
- Number of runners: 6
- Winner's time: 2:26.78

== Full result ==
Pos.	Marg.	Horse (bred)	Age	Jockey	Trainer (Country)	Odds
1		Harbinger (GB)	4	Olivier Peslier	Michael Stoute (GB)	4/1
2	11	Cape Blanco (IRE)	4	Colm O'Donoghue	Aidan O'Brien (IRE)	9/2
3	3¼	Youmzain (IRE)	7	Richard Hughes	Mick Channon (GB)	12/1
4	nk	Daryakana (IRE)	4	Gerald Mosse	Alain de Royer-Dupré (FR)	14/1
5	2¼	Workforce (GB)	3	Ryan Moore	Michael Stoute (GB)	8/11 fav
6	6	Confront (GB)	5	Richard Mullen	Michael Stoute (GB)	100/1

- Abbreviations: nse = nose; nk = neck; shd = head; hd = head

== Winner's details ==
Further details of the winner, Harbinger

- Sex: Colt
- Foaled: 12 March 2006
- Country: United Kingdom
- Sire: Dansili; Dam: Penang Pearl (Bering)
- Owner: Highclere "Admiral Rous"
- Breeder: A. K. H. Ooi
