= 1997 King George VI and Queen Elizabeth Stakes =

47th King George VI and Queen Elizabeth Stakes
- King George VI and Queen Elizabeth Stakes
- Location: Ascot Racecourse
- Date: 26 July 1997
- Winning horse: Swain (IRE)
- Jockey: John Reid
- Trainer: Saeed bin Suroor (GB)
- Owner: Godolphin

The 1997 King George VI and Queen Elizabeth Stakes was a horse race held at Ascot Racecourse on Saturday 26 July 1997. It was the 47th running of the King George VI and Queen Elizabeth Stakes.

The winner was Godolphin's Swain, a five-year-old bay horse trained at Newmarket, Suffolk by Saeed bin Suroor and ridden by John Reid. Swain's victory was the second in the race for bin Suroor and the first Godolphin. In addition, Godolphin's leader Sheikh Mohammed, had won the race with Belmez (1990), Opera House (1993) and King's Theatre (1994). Reid was winning the second time after riding Ile de Bourbon to victory in 1978.

== The race ==
The race attracted a field of eight runners: seven from the United Kingdom, and one from France. The favourite for the race was the French-trained Helissio who had been named European Horse of the Year in 1996 when his wins included the Prix Lupin, Grand Prix de Saint-Cloud and Prix de l'Arc de Triomphe. In his first two starts of 1997, Helissio had won the Prix Ganay and a second Grand Prix de Saint-Cloud. Michael Stoute's Newmarket stable were represented by two five-year-old horses who had achieved significant international success: Singspiel had won the Canadian International Stakes, Japan Cup, Dubai World Cup and Coronation Cup whilst Pilsudski had claimed victories in the Grosser Preis von Baden, Breeders' Cup Turf and Eclipse Stakes. Swain was the representative of the Godolphin stable: originally trained in France, he had finished third in the 1995 Prix de l'Arc de Triomphe and won the Coronation Cup in 1996. The other runners were Kingfisher Mill (King Edward VII Stakes), Predappio Hardwicke Stakes, Shantou (St Leger Stakes, Gran Premio del Jockey Club) and Strategic Choice (Irish St Leger, Gran Premio di Milano). Helissio headed the betting at odds of 11/10 ahead of Singspiel (4/1), Pilsudski (6/1) and Kingfisher Mill. Swain started at odds of 16/1.

The race was run on soft ground in wet and misty conditions. Helissio took the lead at the start but was headed by Kingfisher Mill, before regaining the advantage five furlongs from the finish. Helissio led the field into the straight, pursued by Swain, Pilsudski and Singspiel. Swain moved into the lead two furlongs from the finish but was challenged by Pilsudski and Singspiel on the outside, whilst Helissio stayed on along the rail. In the closing stages Swain was driven out by Reid to win by a length from Pilsudski with Helissio a lengths and a quarter back in third and Singspiel weakening into fourth place. Shantou finished next ahead of Strategic Choice, Predappio and the injured Kingfisher Mill.

== Race details ==
- Sponsor: De Beers
- Purse: £478,400; First prize: £294,600
- Surface: Turf
- Going: Soft
- Distance: 12 furlongs
- Number of runners: 8
- Winner's time: 2:36.45

== Full result ==
Pos.	Marg.	Horse (bred)	Age	Jockey	Trainer (Country)	Odds
1		Swain (IRE)	5	John Reid	Saeed bin Suroor (GB)	16/1
2	1	Pilsudski (IRE)	5	Mick Kinane	Michael Stoute (GB)	6/1
3	1¼	Helissio (FR)	4	Cash Asmussen	Élie Lellouche (FR)	11/10 fav
4	2½	Singspiel (IRE)	5	Frankie Dettori	Michael Stoute (GB)	4/1
5	4	Shantou (USA)	4	Gary Hind	John Gosden (GB)	16/1
6	5	Strategic Choice (USA)	6	Ray Cochrane	Paul Cole (GB)	66/1
7	3	Predappio (GB)	4	Gary Stevens	Saeed bin Suroor (GB)	12/1
8	13	Kingfisher Mill (USA)	3	Pat Eddery	Julie Cecil (GB)	8/1

- Abbreviations: nse = nose; nk = neck; shd = head; hd = head; dist = distance

== Winner's details ==
Further details of the winner, Swain

- Sex: Stallion
- Foaled: 12 February 1992
- Country: Ireland
- Sire: Nashwan; Dam: Love Smitten (Key to the Mint)
- Owner: Godolphin
- Breeder: Sheikh Mohammed
