= 1998 King George VI and Queen Elizabeth Stakes =

British horse race

48th King George VI and Queen Elizabeth Stakes
- King George VI and Queen Elizabeth Stakes
- Location: Ascot Racecourse
- Date: 25 July 1998
- Winning horse: Swain (IRE)
- Jockey: Frankie Dettori
- Trainer: Saeed bin Suroor (GB)
- Owner: Godolphin

The 1998 King George VI and Queen Elizabeth Stakes was a horse race held at Ascot Racecourse on Saturday 25 July 1998. It was the 48th running of the King George VI and Queen Elizabeth Stakes.

The winner for the second consecutive year was Godolphin's Swain, a six-year-old bay horse trained at Newmarket, Suffolk by Saeed bin Suroor and ridden by Frankie Dettori. Swain's victory was the third in the race for bin Suroor and the second for Dettori and Godolphin. In addition, Godolphin's leader Sheikh Mohammed, had won the race with Belmez (1990), Opera House (1993) and King's Theatre (1994). Swain was the first male horse to win the race twice: the only previous dual winner was the French-trained filly Dahlia in 1973 and 1974. He remains the only six-year-old to win the race.

== The race ==
The race attracted a field of eight runners: seven from the United Kingdom, and one from Ireland. The favourite for the race was the Luca Cumani-trained High-Rise an unbeaten three-year-old colt who had won the Epsom Derby on his most recent appearance. The Godolphin stable fielded three runners, the four-year-old Daylami, originally trained in France, whose wins included the Poule d'Essai des Poulains and Eclipse Stakes the pacemaker Happy Valentine and Swain, who had won the race in 1997 and whose other victories included the Coronation Cup. The other British-trained runners were the undefeated King Edward VII Stakes winner Royal Anthem, the 1997 St Leger Stakes winner Silver Patriarch and the Jockey Club Stakes winner Romanov. The Irish challenger was Risk Material, the winner of the Derrinstown Stud Derby Trial. High-Rise headed the betting at odds of 11/4 ahead of Royal Anthem (7/2), Silver Patriarch (9/2), Swain (11/2) and Daylami (6/1).

As expected, Happy Valentine took the early lead and set a strong pace from Royal Anthem, Swain, Daylami and High-Rise. Royal Anthem overtook Happy Valentine approaching the turn into the straight as Swain moved up to challenge. Swain took the lead inside the last quarter mile and stayed on to win by a length from High-Rise with Royal Anthem one and a half lengths back in third. The next three places were filled by Daylami, Romanov and Silver Patriarch.

== Race details ==
- Sponsor: De Beers
- Purse: £576,000; First prize: £354,000
- Surface: Turf
- Going: Good to Firm
- Distance: 12 furlongs
- Number of runners: 8
- Winner's time: 2:29.06

== Full result ==
Pos.	Marg.	Horse (bred)	Age	Jockey	Trainer (Country)	Odds
1		Swain (IRE)	6	Frankie Dettori	Saeed bin Suroor (GB)	11/2
2	1	High-Rise (IRE)	3	Olivier Peslier	Luca Cumani (GB)	11/4 fav
3	1½	Royal Anthem (USA)	3	Kieren Fallon	Henry Cecil (GB)	7/2
4	½	Daylami (IRE)	4	Mick Kinane	Saeed bin Suroor (GB)	6/1
5	5	Romanov (USA)	4	John Reid	Peter Chapple-Hyam (GB)	8/1
6	2	Silver Patriarch (IRE)	4	Pat Eddery	John Dunlop (GB)	9/2
7	7	Happy Valentine (GB)	4	Daragh O'Donohoe	Saeed bin Suroor (GB)	33/1
8	8	Risk Material (IRE)	3	Walter Swinburn	Aidan O'Brien (IRE)	50/1

- Abbreviations: nse = nose; nk = neck; shd = head; hd = head; dist = distance

== Winner's details ==
Further details of the winner, Swain

- Sex: Stallion
- Foaled: 12 February 1992
- Country: Ireland
- Sire: Nashwan; Dam: Love Smitten (Key to the Mint)
- Owner: Godolphin
- Breeder: Sheikh Mohammed
