= 1995 King George VI and Queen Elizabeth Stakes =

45th King George VI and Queen Elizabeth Stakes
- King George VI and Queen Elizabeth Stakes
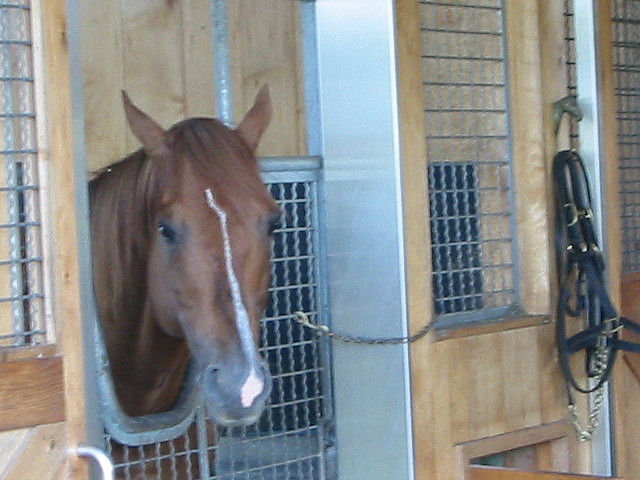
- Location: Ascot Racecourse
- Date: 22 July 1995
- Winning horse: Lammtarra (USA)
- Jockey: Frankie Dettori
- Trainer: Saeed bin Suroor (GB)
- Owner: Saeed bin Maktoum al Maktoum

The 1995 King George VI and Queen Elizabeth Stakes was a horse race held at Ascot Racecourse on Saturday 22 July 1995. It was the 45th running of the King George VI and Queen Elizabeth Stakes.

The winner was Saeed bin Maktoum al Maktoum's Lammtarra, a three-year-old chestnut colt trained at Newmarket, Suffolk by Saeed bin Suroor and ridden by Frankie Dettori. Lammtarra's victory was the first in the race for his owner, trainer and jockey.

== The race ==
The race attracted a field of seven runners: five from the United Kingdom, and two from France. The favourite for the race was the undefeated three-year-old colt Lammtarra who had won the Epsom Derby on his most recent appearance. The best of the other British runners appeared to be another three-year-old colt, Pentire who had not contested the Derby but was unbeaten in his last four races, winning the Classic Trial Stakes, Dee Stakes, Predominate Stakes and King Edward VII Stakes. The French challengers were Carnegie, the winner of the Prix de l'Arc de Triomphe and the Grand Prix de Saint-Cloud and Winged Love, the winner of the Irish Derby. The other runners were Broadway Flyer (Chester Vase, Gordon Stakes), Strategic Choice (John Porter Stakes) and the seven-year-old veteran Environment Friend, the winner of the 1991 (Eclipse Stakes). Lammtarra headed the betting at odds of 9/4 ahead of Carnegie (11/4), Pentire (3/1) and Winged Love (9/2).

Broadway Flyer took the lead and set the pace Strategic Choice and Environment Friend with Carnegie, Winged Love and Lammtarra close behind and Pentire held up in last place Broadway Flyer maintained his lead into the straight where he was challenged on the outside by Strategic Choice, Lammtarra and Pentire with the last named gaining the advantage with two furlongs to run. The closing stages of the race developed into a struggle between Pentire and Lammtarra with the Derby winner prevailing. Strategic Choice held off the late challenge of Winged Love to take third, ahead of Broadway Flyer, Carnegie and Environment Friend.

== Race details ==
- Sponsor: De Beers
- Purse: £452,070; First prize: £278,760
- Surface: Turf
- Going: Good to Firm
- Distance: 12 furlongs
- Number of runners: 7
- Winner's time: 2:31.01

== Full result ==
Pos.	Marg.	Horse (bred)	Age	Jockey	Trainer (Country)	Odds
1		Lammtarra (USA)	3	Frankie Dettori	Saeed bin Suroor (GB)	9/4 fav
2	nk	Pentire (GB)	3	Michael Hills	Geoff Wragg (GB)	3/1
3	1½	Strategic Choice (USA)	4	Richard Quinn	Paul Cole (GB)	25/1
4	hd	Winged Love (IRE)	3	Olivier Peslier	André Fabre (FR)	9/2
5	hd	Broadway Flyer (USA)	4	Richard Hills	John Hills (GB)	12/1
6	1¼	Carnegie (IRE)	3	Thierry Jarnet	André Fabre (FR)	11/4
7	4	Environment Friend (GB)	7	Brett Doyle	Clive Brittain (GB)	50/1

- Abbreviations: nse = nose; nk = neck; shd = head; hd = head; dist = distance

== Winner's details ==
Further details of the winner, Lammtarra

- Sex: Colt
- Foaled: 2 February 1992
- Country: United States
- Sire: Nijinsky; Dam: Snow Bride (Blushing Groom)
- Owner: Saeed bin Maktoum al Maktoum
- Breeder: Gainsborough Farms
