= 2018 King George VI and Queen Elizabeth Stakes =

68th King George VI and Queen Elizabeth Stakes
- King George VI and Queen Elizabeth Stakes
- Location: Ascot Racecourse
- Date: 28 July 2018
- Winning horse: Poet's Word
- Jockey: James Doyle
- Trainer: Michael Stoute
- Owner: Saeed Suhail
- Conditions: Good to Firm

The 2018 King George VI and Queen Elizabeth Stakes was a horse race held at Ascot Racecourse on Saturday 28 July 2018. It was the 68th running of the King George VI and Queen Elizabeth Stakes.

The winner was Poet's Word, a five-year-old bay horse trained at Newmarket by Michael Stoute, ridden by James Doyle and owned by Saeed Suhail. Poet's Word's victory was the first in the race for both his owner and jockey. Stoute was winning the race for a record sixth time following his successes with Shergar (1981), Opera House (1993), Golan (2002), Conduit (2009) and Harbinger (2010). Poet's Word was the sixth five-year-old male to win the race following Aggressor, Mtoto, Opera House, Swain and Daylami.

== The contenders ==
The race attracted a field of seven runners, five from England and two from Ireland. There were no challengers from continental Europe.

The race appeared to be sub-standard by King George standards as the only previous Group one winners in the race were Poet's Word, an improving five-year-old who had defeated Cracksman in the Prince of Wales's Stakes at Royal Ascot, and the Irish trained filly Hydrangea who had won the Matron Stakes and the British Champions Fillies & Mares Stakes in 2017. Another major contender was Crystal Ocean, a stablemate of Poet's Word, who had finished runner-up in the St Leger and recorded an impressive victory in the Hardwicke Stakes. John Gosden, who had won the race in 2017 with Enable was represented by Coronet, a four-year-old filly who won the Ribblesdale Stakes as a three-year-old and had been narrowly beaten in the Grand Prix de Saint-Cloud. The only three-year-old in the field was Rotropovich, trained like Hydrangea by Aidan O'Brien, who had finished second in the Irish Derby. The other two runners were Salouen (runner-up to Cracksman in the Coronation Cup) and Desert Encounter.

Crystal Ocean was made the 6/4 favourite ahead of Poet's Word on 7/4, Coronet on 15/2, Hydrangea on 10/1 and Rostropovich on 12/1.

== The race ==
Rotropovich took the early lead and set a strong pace from Salouen and Crystal Ocean. Hydrangea was settled in fourth place ahead of Coronet and Poet's Word while Desert Encounter started slowly and trailed the field. Shortly after entering the straight, Crystal Ocean overtook the weakening Rostropovich and opened up a clear advantage. Hydrangea was already well beaten and Salouen was unable to improve his position but Coronet began to stay on strongly. The only serious challenger to Crystal Ocean was Poet's Word who moved up on the wide outside and joined his stablemate a furlong from the finish. In a keenly contested struggle Poet's Word prevailed by a neck, with a gap of nine lengths back to Coronet in third. Four lengths back Salouen narrowly secured fourth place from Rostropovich while there were long gaps back to Desert Encounter and the tailed-off Hydrangea.

== Race details ==
- Sponsor: QIPCO
- Purse: £1,229,625; First prize: £708,875
- Surface: Turf
- Going: Good to Firm
- Distance: 12 furlongs
- Number of runners: 7
- Winner's time: 2:25.84

== Full result ==
Pos.	Marg.	Horse (bred)	Age	Jockey	Trainer (Country)	Odds
1		Poet's Word (IRE)	5	James Doyle	Michael Stoute (GB)	7/4
2	nk	Crystal Ocean (GB)	4	William Buick	Michael Stoute (GB)	6/4 fav
3	9	Coronet (GB)	4	Olivier Peslier	John Gosden (GB)	15/2
4	4	Salouen (IRE)	4	Silvestre de Sousa	Sylvester Kirk (GB)	20/1
5	shd	Rostropovich (IRE)	3	Seamie Heffernan	Aidan O'Brien (IRE)	12/1
6	8	Desert Encounter (IRE)	6	Andrea Atzeni	David Simcock (GB)	33/1
7	18	Hydrangea (IRE)	4	Ryan Moore	Aidan O'Brien (IRE)	10/1

- Abbreviations: nse = nose; nk = neck; shd = head; hd = head

== Winner's details ==
Further details of the winner, Poet's Word

- Sex: Horse
- Foaled: 5 April 2013
- Country: Ireland
- Sire: Poet's Voice
- Owner: Saeed Suhail
- Breeder: Woodcote Stud
