= King George VI and Queen Elizabeth Stakes =

Flat horse race in Britain

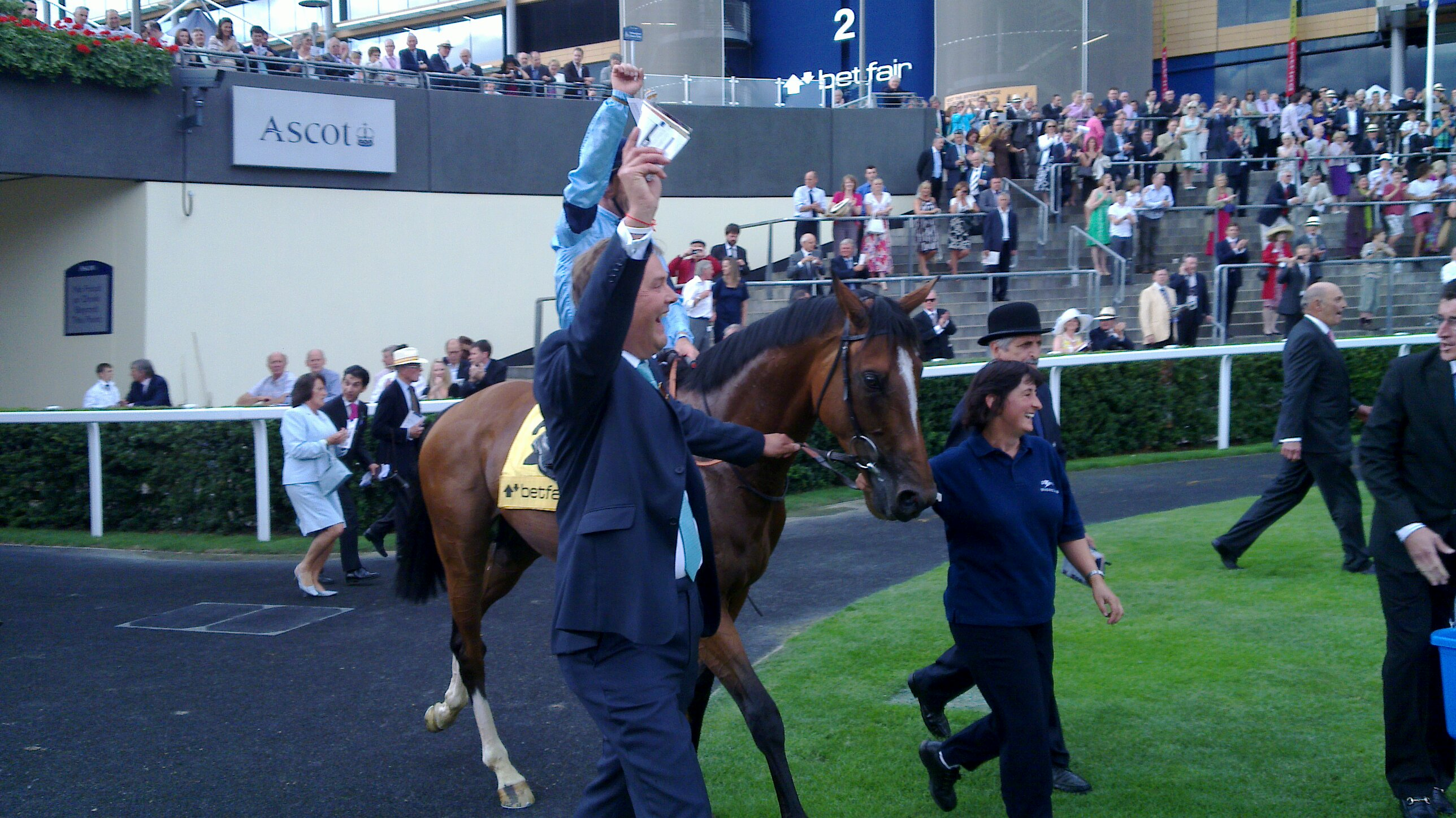
- Harbinger being led in after winning the 2010 renewal
- Class: Group 1
- Location: Ascot Racecourse; Ascot, England
- Inaugurated: 1951; 75 years ago
- Race type: Flat / Thoroughbred
- Website: Ascot

Race information
- Distance: 1m 3f 211y (2,406 metres)
- Surface: Turf
- Track: Right-handed
- Qualification: Three-years-old and up
- Weight: 8 st 12 lb (3yo); 9 st 9 lb (4yo+); Allowances; 3 lb for fillies and mares 4 lb for S. Hemisphere 4yo
- Purse: £2,000,000 (2026); 1st: £1,134,200

King George VI & Queen Elizabeth Stakes
2026
Kalpana	Calandagan	Benvenuto Cellini

Previous years
2025
Calandagan	Kalpana	Rebel's Romance
2024
Goliath	Bluestocking	Rebel's Romance
2023
Hukum	Westover	King Of Steel
2022
Pyledriver	Torquator Tasso	Mishriff
2021
Adayar	Mishriff	Love

2020-2011
2020
Enable	Sovereign	Japan
2019
Enable	Crystal Ocean	Waldgeist
2018
Poet's Word	Crystal Ocean	Coronet
2017
Enable	Ulysses	Idaho
2016
Highland Reel	Wings of Desire	Dartmouth
2015
Postponed	Eagle Top	Romsdal
2014
Taghrooda	Telescope	Mukhadram
2013
Novellist	Trading Leather	Hillstar
2012
Danedream	Nathaniel	St Nicholas Abbey
2011
Nathaniel	Workforce	St Nicholas Abbey

2010-2001
2010
Harbinger	Cape Blanco	Youmzain
2009
Conduit	Tartan Bearer	Ask
2008
Duke Of Marmalade	Papal Bull	Youmzain
2007
Dylan Thomas	Youmzain	Maraahel
2006
Hurricane Run	Electrocutionist	Heart's Cry
2005
Azamour	Norse Dancer	Bago
2004
Doyen	Hard Buck	Sulamani
2003
Alamshar	Sulamani	Kris Kin
2002
Golan	Nayef	Zindabad
2001
Galileo	Fantastic Light	Hightori

2000-1991
2000
Montjeu	Fantastic Light	Daliapour
1999
Daylami	Nedawi	Fruits of Love
1998
Swain	High-Rise	Royal Anthem
1997
Swain	Pilsudski	Helissio
1996
Pentire	Classic Cliche	Shaamit
1995
Lammtarra	Pentire	Strategic Choice
1994
King's Theatre	White Muzzle	Wagon Master
1993
Opera House	White Muzzle	Commander In Chief
1992
St Jovite	Saddlers' Hall	Opera House
1991
Generous	Sanglamore	Rock Hopper

1990-1981
1990
Belmez	Old Vic	Assatis
1989
Nashwan	Cacoethes	Top Class
1988
Mtoto	Unfuwain	Tony Bin
1987
Reference Point	Celestial Storm	Triptych
1986
Dancing Brave	Shardari	Triptych
1985
Petoski	Oh So Sharp	Rainbow Quest
1984
Teenoso	Sadler's Wells	Tolomeo
1983
Time Charter	Diamond Shoal	Sun Princess
1982
Kalaglow	Assert	Glint of Gold
1981
Shergar	Madam Gay	Fingal's Cave

1980-1971
1980
Ela-Mana-Mou	Mrs Penny	Gregorian
1979
Troy	Gay Mecene	Ela-Mana-Mou
1978
Ile de Bourbon	Acamas	Hawaiian Sound
1977
The Minstrel	Orange Bay	Exceller
1976
Pawneese	Bruni	Orange Bay
1975
Grundy	Bustino	Dahlia
1974
Dahlia	Highclere	Dankaro
1973
Dahlia	Rheingold	Our Mirage
1972
Brigadier Gerard	Parnell	Riverman
1971
Mill Reef	Ortis	Acclimatization

1970-1961
1970
Nijinsky	Blakeney	Crepellana
1969
Park Top	Crozier	Hogarth
1968
Royal Palace	Felicio	Topyo
1967
Busted	Salvo	Ribocco
1966
Aunt Edith	Sodium	Prominer
1965
Meadow Court	Soderini	Oncidium
1964
Nasram	Santa Claus	Royal Avenue
1963
Ragusa	Miralgo	Tarqogan
1962
Match	Aurelius	Arctic Storm
1961
Right Royal	St. Paddy	Rockavon

1960-1951
1960
Aggressor	Petite Etoile	Kythnos
1959
Alcide	Gladness	Balbo
1958
Ballymoss	Almeria	Doutelle
1957
Montaval	Al Mabsoot	Tribord
1956
Ribot	High Veldt	Todrai
1955
Vimy	Acropolis	Elopement
1954
Aureole	Vamos	Darius
1953
Pinza	Aureole	Worden
1952
Tulyar	Gay Time	Worden
1951
Supreme Court	Zucchero	Tantieme

The King George VI and Queen Elizabeth Stakes is a Group 1 flat horse race in Great Britain open to horses aged three years or older. It is run at Ascot over a distance of 1 mile 3 furlongs and 211 yards (2,406 metres), and it is scheduled to take place each year in July.

It is Britain's most prestigious open-age flat race, and its roll of honour features some of the most highly acclaimed horses of the sport's recent history. The 1975 running, which involved a hard-fought battle to the finish between Grundy and Bustino, is frequently described as the "race of the century". Many of its winners subsequently compete in the Prix de l'Arc de Triomphe, and a number go on to have a successful career at stud. The race is often informally referred to as the "King George".

== History ==
The event was formed as the result of an amalgamation of two separate races at Ascot which were established in 1946 and 1948. The first of these, named after King George VI, was a 2-mile contest for three-year-olds held in October. The second, in honour of his wife, Queen Elizabeth, was a one and a half-mile event staged in July. The idea was conceived by Major John Crocker Bulteel, the Clerk of the Course at Ascot, who wanted to create an important international race over one and a half miles for horses aged three or older. The inaugural running of the combined race took place on 21 July 1951. In its first year, to commemorate the Festival of Britain, it was titled the King George VI and Queen Elizabeth Festival of Britain Stakes.

During the early part of its history the King George VI and Queen Elizabeth Stakes was not commercially sponsored. Its first period of sponsorship started in 1972, when it began a long association with the diamond company De Beers. The word "Diamond" was added to the race's title when permission for its inclusion was given by Queen Elizabeth II in 1975. It became known as the King George VI and Queen Elizabeth Diamond Stakes, and De Beers continued to back the event until 2006.

The online betting company Betfair started to sponsor the King George in 2009, and its prize fund was increased from £750,000 to £1,500,000 in 2024 and from 2026, £2,000,000. From 2026, it will be Britain's joint richest horse race, alongside The Derby.

The King George VI and Queen Elizabeth Stakes became part of the Breeders' Cup Challenge series in 2011. The winner now earns an automatic invitation to compete in the same year's Breeders' Cup Turf.

== Records ==
Most successful horse (3 wins):

- Enable – 2017, 2019, 2020

Leading jockey (7 wins):

- Lester Piggott – Meadow Court (1965), Aunt Edith (1966), Park Top (1969), Nijinsky (1970), Dahlia (1974), The Minstrel (1977), Teenoso (1984)
- Frankie Dettori – Lammtarra (1995), Swain (1998), Daylami (1999), Doyen (2004), Enable (2017, 2019, 2020)

Leading trainer (6 wins):

- Sir Michael Stoute – Shergar (1981), Opera House (1993), Golan (2002), Conduit (2009), Harbinger (2010), Poet's Word (2018)

Leading owner (6 wins): (includes part ownership)

- Michael Tabor – Montjeu (2000), Galileo (2001), Hurricane Run (2006), Dylan Thomas (2007), Duke of Marmalade (2008), Highland Reel (2016)

Fastest winning time:

- Novellist (2013) – 2m 24.60s

Widest winning margin:

- Harbinger (2010) – 11 lengths

== Winners ==
Year	Winner	Age	Jockey	Trainer	Owner	Time
1951	Supreme Court	3	Charlie Elliott	Evan Williams	Vera Lilley	2:29.40
1952	Tulyar	3	Charlie Smirke	Marcus Marsh	HH Aga Khan III	2:33.00
1953	Pinza	3	Sir Gordon Richards	Norman Bertie	Sir Victor Sassoon	2:34.00
1954	Aureole	4	Eph Smith	Cecil Boyd-Rochfort	Queen Elizabeth II	2:44.00
1955	Vimy	3	Roger Poincelet	Alec Head	Pierre Wertheimer	2:33.76
1956	Ribot	4	Enrico Camici	Ugo Penco	Mario della Rocchetta	2:40.24
1957	Montaval	4	Freddie Palmer	Georges Bridgland	Ralph B. Strassburger	2:41.02
1958	Ballymoss	4	Scobie Breasley	Vincent O'Brien	John McShain	2:36.33
1959	Alcide	4	Harry Carr	Cecil Boyd-Rochfort	Sir Humphrey de Trafford	2:31.39
1960	Aggressor	5	Jimmy Lindley	Towser Gosden	Sir Harold Wernher	2:35.21
1961	Right Royal	3	Roger Poincelet	Etienne Pollet	Elisabeth Couturié	2:40.34
1962	Match	4	Yves Saint-Martin	François Mathet	François Dupré	2:32.02 (Note: The time of the 1962 race was incorrectly given on the day of the race as 2 min. 32.02 and corrected to 2 min. 37.02 in October 1962.)
1963	Ragusa	3	Garnie Bougoure	Paddy Prendergast	Jim Mullion	2:33.80
1964	Nasram	4	Bill Pyers	Ernie Fellows	Mrs Howell Jackson	2:33.15
1965	Meadow Court	3	Lester Piggott	Paddy Prendergast	Bell / McMahon / Crosby	2:33.27
1966	Aunt Edith	4	Lester Piggott	Noel Murless	John Hornung	2:35.06
1967	Busted	4	George Moore	Noel Murless	Stanhope Joel	2:33.64
1968	Royal Palace	4	Sandy Barclay	Noel Murless	Jim Joel	2:33.22
1969	Park Top	5	Lester Piggott	Bernard van Cutsem	11th Duke of Devonshire	2:32.46
1970	Nijinsky	3	Lester Piggott	Vincent O'Brien	Charles Engelhard	2:36.16
1971	Mill Reef	3	Geoff Lewis	Ian Balding	Paul Mellon	2:32.56
1972	Brigadier Gerard	4	Joe Mercer	Dick Hern	Jean Hislop	2:32.91
1973	Dahlia	3	Bill Pyers	Maurice Zilber	Nelson Bunker Hunt	2:30.43
1974	Dahlia	4	Lester Piggott	Maurice Zilber	Nelson Bunker Hunt	2:33.03
1975	Grundy	3	Pat Eddery	Peter Walwyn	Carlo Vittadini	2:26.98
1976	Pawneese	3	Yves Saint-Martin	Angel Penna Sr.	Daniel Wildenstein	2:29.36
1977	The Minstrel	3	Lester Piggott	Vincent O'Brien	Robert Sangster	2:30.48
1978	Ile de Bourbon	3	John Reid	Fulke Johnson Houghton	David McCall	2:30.53
1979	Troy	3	Willie Carson	Dick Hern	Sobell / Weinstock	2:33.75
1980	Ela-Mana-Mou	4	Willie Carson	Dick Hern	Simon Weinstock	2:35.39
1981	Shergar	3	Walter Swinburn	Michael Stoute	HH Aga Khan IV	2:35.40
1982	Kalaglow	4	Greville Starkey	Guy Harwood	Tony Ward	2:31.88
1983	Time Charter	4	Joe Mercer	Henry Candy	Robert Barnett	2:30.79
1984	Teenoso	4	Lester Piggott	Geoff Wragg	Eric Moller	2:27.95
1985	Petoski	3	Willie Carson	Dick Hern	Lady Beaverbrook	2:27.61
1986	Dancing Brave	3	Pat Eddery	Guy Harwood	Khalid Abdullah	2:29.49
1987	Reference Point	3	Steve Cauthen	Henry Cecil	Louis Freedman	2:34.63
1988	Mtoto	5	Michael Roberts	Alec Stewart	Ahmed Al Maktoum	2:37.33
1989	Nashwan	3	Willie Carson	Dick Hern	Hamdan Al Maktoum	2:32.27
1990	Belmez	3	Michael Kinane	Henry Cecil	Sheikh Mohammed	2:30.76
1991	Generous	3	Alan Munro	Paul Cole	Prince Fahd bin Salman	2:28.99
1992	St Jovite	3	Stephen Craine	Jim Bolger	Virginia Kraft Payson	2:30.85
1993	Opera House	5	Michael Roberts	Michael Stoute	Sheikh Mohammed	2:33.94
1994	King's Theatre	3	Michael Kinane	Henry Cecil	Sheikh Moh'd / Poland	2:28.92
1995	Lammtarra	3	Frankie Dettori	Saeed bin Suroor	Saeed bin M. Al Maktoum	2:31.01
1996	Pentire	4	Michael Hills	Geoff Wragg	Mollers Racing	2:28.11
1997	Swain	5	John Reid	Saeed bin Suroor	Godolphin	2:36.45
1998	Swain	6	Frankie Dettori	Saeed bin Suroor	Godolphin	2:29.06
1999	Daylami	5	Frankie Dettori	Saeed bin Suroor	Godolphin	2:29.35
2000	Montjeu	4	Michael Kinane	John Hammond	Michael Tabor	2:29.98
2001	Galileo	3	Michael Kinane	Aidan O'Brien	Magnier / Tabor	2:27.71
2002	Golan	4	Kieren Fallon	Sir Michael Stoute	Exors of Lord Weinstock	2:29.70
2003	Alamshar	3	Johnny Murtagh	John Oxx	HH Aga Khan IV	2:33.26
2004	Doyen	4	Frankie Dettori	Saeed bin Suroor	Godolphin	2:33.18
2005 (Note: The 2005 running took place at Newbury)	Azamour	4	Michael Kinane	John Oxx	HH Aga Khan IV	2:28.26
2006	Hurricane Run	4	Christophe Soumillon	André Fabre	Michael Tabor	2:30.29
2007	Dylan Thomas	4	Johnny Murtagh	Aidan O'Brien	Magnier / Tabor	2:31.11
2008	Duke of Marmalade	4	Johnny Murtagh	Aidan O'Brien	Magnier / Tabor	2:27.91
2009	Conduit	4	Ryan Moore	Sir Michael Stoute	Ballymacoll Stud	2:28.73
2010	Harbinger	4	Olivier Peslier	Sir Michael Stoute	Highclere "Admiral Rous"	2:26.78
2011	Nathaniel	3	William Buick	John Gosden	Lady Rothschild	2:35.07
2012	Danedream	4	Andrasch Starke	Peter Schiergen	Burg Eberstein / Yoshida	2:31.62
2013	Novellist	4	Johnny Murtagh	Andreas Wohler	Christoph Berglar	2:24.60
2014	Taghrooda	3	Paul Hanagan	John Gosden	Hamdan Al Maktoum	2:28.13
2015	Postponed	4	Andrea Atzeni	Luca Cumani	Mohammed Obaid Al Maktoum	2:31.25
2016	Highland Reel	4	Ryan Moore	Aidan O'Brien	Magnier / Tabor/ Smith	2:28.97
2017	Enable	3	Frankie Dettori	John Gosden	Khalid Abdullah	2:36.22
2018	Poet's Word	5	James Doyle	Sir Michael Stoute	Saeed Suhail	2:25.84
2019	Enable	5	Frankie Dettori	John Gosden	Khalid Abdullah	2:32.42
2020	Enable	6	Frankie Dettori	John Gosden	Khalid Abdullah	2:28.92
2021	Adayar	3	William Buick	Charlie Appleby	Godolphin	2:26.54
2022	Pyledriver	5	P. J. McDonald	William Muir & Chris Grassick	La Pyle Partnership	2:29.49
2023	Hukum	6	Jim Crowley	Owen Burrows	Shadwell Racing	2:33.95
2024	Goliath	4	Christophe Soumillon	Francis-Henri Graffard	Philip Baron Von Ullmann	2:27.43
2025	Calandagan	4	Mickael Barzalona	Francis-Henri Graffard	Aga Khan Studs	2:29.74
2026	Kalpana	5	Colin Keane	Andrew Balding	Juddmonte	2:27.72

- Since 2006 the race has been run over the same distance but over a reconstructed course in the final two furlongs

== See also ==
- Horse racing in Great Britain
- List of British flat horse races
- King George VI and Queen Elizabeth Stakes top three finishers
