= 2011 King George VI and Queen Elizabeth Stakes =

61st King George VI and Queen Elizabeth Stakes
- King George VI and Queen Elizabeth Stakes
- Nathaniel Workforce St Nicholas Abbey
- Location: Ascot Racecourse
- Date: 23 July 2011
- Winning horse: Nathaniel (IRE)
- Jockey: William Buick
- Trainer: John Gosden (GB)
- Owner: Lady Rothschild

The 2011 King George VI and Queen Elizabeth Stakes was a horse race held at Ascot Racecourse on Saturday 23 July 2011. It was the 61st King George VI and Queen Elizabeth Stakes.

The winner was Lady Rothschild's Nathaniel, a three-year-old bay colt trained at Newmarket, Suffolk by John Gosden and ridden by William Buick. Nathaniel's victory was the first for his jockey, trainer and owner.

== The race ==
Before the race, Nathaniel had contested five races, bypassing the Epsom Derby before recording his most important success when winning the Group Two King Edward VII Stakes at Royal Ascot in June. The 2011 King George VI and Queen Elizabeth Stakes attracted five runners, the smallest field since 1966, and Nathaniel was the only three-year-old to take part. The other contenders were Workforce (Epsom Derby, Prix de l'Arc de Triomphe), Rewilding (Dubai Sheema Classic, Prince of Wales's Stakes), St Nicholas Abbey (Racing Post Trophy, Coronation Cup) and Debussy (Arlington Million). Starting the 11/2 fourth choice in the betting, Nathaniel took an early lead before settling in second place behind Debussy. He moved up to regain the lead two furlongs from the finish at which point Rewilding fell heavily and was fatally injured. Workforce then emerged as Nathaniel's main challenger, but the Derby winner veered to the left in the closing stages and the three-year-old won by two and three-quarter lengths, with St Nicholas Abbey in third place.

== Race details ==
- Sponsor: Betfair
- Purse: £1,033,263; First prize: £611,124
- Surface: Turf
- Going: Good to Soft
- Distance: 12 furlongs
- Number of runners: 5
- Winner's time: 2:35.07

== Full result ==
Pos.	Marg.	Horse (bred)	Age	Jockey	Trainer (Country)	Odds
1		Nathaniel (IRE)	3	William Buick	John Gosden (GB)	11/2
2	2¾	Workforce (GB)	4	Ryan Moore	Michael Stoute (GB)	6/5 fav
3	1¼	St Nicholas Abbey (IRE)	4	Joseph O'Brien	Aidan O'Brien (IRE)	7/2
4	20	Debussy (IRE)	5	Ahmed Ajtebi	Mahmood Al Zarooni (GB)	20/1
Fell		Rewilding (GB)	4	Frankie Dettori	Mahmood Al Zarooni (GB)	3/1

- Abbreviations: nse = nose; nk = neck; shd = head; hd = head

== Winner's details ==
Further details of the winner, Nathaniel

- Sex: Colt
- Foaled: 24 April 2008
- Country: Ireland
- Sire: Galileo; Dam: Magnificient Style (Silver Hawk)
- Owner: Lady Rothschild
- Breeder: Kincorth Investments
