= 1989 King George VI and Queen Elizabeth Stakes =

39th King George VI and Queen Elizabeth Stakes
- King George VI and Queen Elizabeth Stakes
- Location: Ascot Racecourse
- Date: 22 July 1989
- Winning horse: Nashwan (USA)
- Jockey: Willie Carson
- Trainer: Dick Hern (GB)
- Owner: Hamdan Al Maktoum

The 1989 King George VI and Queen Elizabeth Stakes was a horse race held at Ascot Racecourse on Saturday 22 July 1989. It was the 39th running of the King George VI and Queen Elizabeth Stakes.

The winner was Hamdan Al Maktoum's Nashwan, a three-year-old chestnut colt trained at West Ilsley in Berkshire by Dick Hern and ridden by Willie Carson. Nashwan's victory gave his owner Hamdan Al Maktoum his first win in the race whilst Carson and Hern had won the race with Troy, Ela-Mana-Mou and Petoski. In addition, Hern had trained the 1972 winner Brigadier Gerard.

== The race ==
The race attracted a field of seven runners, six trained in the United Kingdom and one trained in Italy. The favourite was Nashwan, who had won the 2000 Guineas, Epsom Derby and Eclipse Stakes, by an aggregate margin of eleven lengths. His principal rival appeared to be Cacoethes, who had finished third to Nashwan in the Derby before winning the King Edward VII Stakes at Royal Ascot. The best of the older horses, according to the betting, was Sheriff's Star, the winner of the Coronation Cup and the Grand Prix de Saint-Cloud. The only overseas challenger was the Italian colt Tisserand, the winner of the 1988 Derby Italiano. The other runners were Carroll House (Grosser Preis von Baden, Princess of Wales's Stakes), Top Class (Geoffrey Freer Stakes) and Polemos, who was running as a pacemaker for Nashwan. Nashwan headed the betting at odds of 2/9 ahead of Cacoethes (6/1) and Sheriff's Star (10/1).

As expected, Polemos took the early lead and set the pace from Carroll House, Cacoethes and Nashwan. Three furlong from the finish, Top Class made a rapid move forward and led the field into the straight ahead of Carroll House, Nashwan and Cacoethes. Nashwan overtook Top Class with a furlong and a half left to run but was immediately challenged by Cacoethes on the outside. The two three-year-olds drew clear of the other five runners with the Derby winner prevailing by a neck after a prolonged struggle. There was a gap of seven lengths back to Top Class, who held off Sheriff's Star by a length to take third. The last three finishers were Carroll House, Polemos and Tisserand.

== Race details ==
- Sponsor: De Beers
- Purse: £354,380; First prize: £218,088
- Surface: Turf
- Going: Good to Firm
- Distance: 12 furlongs
- Number of runners: 7
- Winner's time: 2:32.27

== Full result ==
Pos.	Marg.	Horse (bred)	Age	Jockey	Trainer (Country)	Odds
1		Nashwan (USA)	3	Willie Carson	Dick Hern (GB)	2/9 fav
2	nk	Cacoethes (USA)	3	Greville Starkey	Guy Harwood (GB)	6/1
3	7	Top Class (GB)	4	Michael Roberts	Clive Brittain (GB)	50/1
4	1	Sheriff's Star (GB)	4	Tony Ives	Lady Herries (GB)	10/1
5	3	Carroll House (IRE)	4	Walter Swinburn	Michael Jarvis (GB)	33/1
6	1½	Polemos (GB)	5	Richard Hills	Harry Thomson Jones (GB)	500/1
7	¾	Tisserand (ITY)	4	L. Sorrentino	Mario Vincis (ITY)	25/1

- Abbreviations: nse = nose; nk = neck; shd = head; hd = head; dist = distance; UR = unseated rider

== Winner's details ==
Further details of the winner, Nashwan

- Sex: Colt
- Foaled: 1 March 1986
- Country: United States
- Sire: Blushing Groom; Dam: Height of Fashion (Bustino)
- Owner: Hamdan Al Maktoum
- Breeder: Hamdan Al Maktoum
