= 2002 King George VI and Queen Elizabeth Stakes =

52nd King George VI and Queen Elizabeth Stakes
- King George VI and Queen Elizabeth Stakes
- Location: Ascot Racecourse
- Date: 27 July 2002
- Winning horse: Golan (IRE)
- Jockey: Kieren Fallon
- Trainer: Michael Stoute (GB)
- Owner: Executors Of The Late Lord Weinstock

The 2002 King George VI and Queen Elizabeth Stakes was a horse race held at Ascot Racecourse on Saturday 27 July 2002. It was the 52nd King George VI and Queen Elizabeth Stakes.

The winner was Executors of The Late Lord Weinstock's Golan, a four-year-old bay colt trained at Newmarket, Suffolk by Michael Stoute and ridden by Kieren Fallon. Golan's victory was the first in the race for Fallon and the third for Stoute after Shergar (1981) and the second for the Aga Khan after Shergar (1981) and Opera House (1993). The Weinstock colours had previously been carried to victory in the race by Troy in 1979 and Ela-Mana-Mou in 1980.

== The race ==
The race attracted a field of nine runners: seven from the United Kingdom, one from Germany and one from France. The Godolphin stable fielded two runners; Grandera the winner of the Singapore Airlines International Cup and Prince of Wales's Stakes and Narrative, the winner of the Dubai City of Gold. The other British trained runners included Nayef (Champion Stakes, Tattersalls Gold Cup) who was accompanied by his pacemaker, Sir Effendi, the 2000 Guineas winner Golan (unraced since finishing sixth in Japan Cup eight months previously), the Barry Hills-trained Storming Home, and the Hardwicke Stakes winner Zindabad. France was represented by the filly Aquarelliste, the winner of the Prix de Diane, Prix Vermeille and Prix Ganay. The other runner was Boreal, a German colt who had won the Deutsches Derby in 2001 and beaten Storming Home in the Coronation Cup. Grandera headed the betting at odds of 13/8 ahead of Golan (11/2), Zindabad (11/2) and Nayef (7/1).

Sir Effendi set a fast pace in the early stages from Narrative, with Zindabad, Aquarelliste and Nayef just behind the leaders and Golan held up in last place. Zindabad took the lead half a mile from the finish and led the field into the straight with Nayef in second ahead of Storming Home and Aquarelliste with Golan making progress along the rail. Nayef gained the advantage approaching the final furlong but was immediately challenged by Golan on the inside. The two colts drew away from their rivals, with Golan prevailing by a head at the line. There was a gap of three and a half lengths back to Zindabad in third. The next three places were filled by Aquarelliste, Grandera and Storming Home.

== Race details ==
- Sponsor: De Beers
- Purse: £750,000; First prize: £435,000
- Surface: Turf
- Going: Good to Firm
- Distance: 12 furlongs
- Number of runners: 9
- Winner's time: 2:29.70

== Full result ==
Pos.	Marg.	Horse (bred)	Age	Jockey	Trainer (Country)	Odds
1		Golan (IRE)	4	Kieren Fallon	Michael Stoute (GB)	11/2
2	hd	Nayef (USA)	4	Richard Hills	Marcus Tregoning (GB)	7/1
3	3½	Zindabad (FR)	6	Kevin Darley	Mark Johnston (GB)	11/2
4	2	Aquarelliste (FR)	4	Dominique Boeuf	Élie Lellouche (FR)	8/1
5	2½	Grandera (IRE)	4	Frankie Dettori	Saeed bin Suroor (GB)	13/8 fav
6	1¼	Storming Home (GB)	4	Michael Hills	Barry Hills (GB)	10/1
7	14	Boreal (GER)	4	Olivier Peslier	Peter Schiergen (GER)	14/1
8	dist	Sir Effendi (IRE)	6	Willie Supple	Marcus Tregoning (GB)	200/1
9	5	Narrative (IRE)	4	Jamie Spencer	Saeed bin Suroor (GB)	16/1

- Abbreviations: nse = nose; nk = neck; shd = head; hd = head; dist = distance

== Winner's details ==
Further details of the winner, Golan

- Sex: Colt
- Foaled: 24 February 1998
- Country: Ireland
- Sire: Spectrum; Dam: Highland Gift (Generous)
- Owner: Executors Of The Late Lord Weinstock
- Breeder: Ballymacoll Stud
