= 2014 King George VI and Queen Elizabeth Stakes =

64th King George VI and Queen Elizabeth Stakes
- King George VI and Queen Elizabeth Stakes
- Taghrooda Telescope Mukhadram
- Location: Ascot Racecourse
- Date: 26 July 2014
- Winning horse: Taghrooda (GB)
- Jockey: Paul Hanagan
- Trainer: John Gosden (GB)
- Owner: Hamdan Al Maktoum

The 2014 King George VI and Queen Elizabeth Stakes was a horse race held at Ascot Racecourse on Saturday 26 July 2014. It was the 64th King George VI and Queen Elizabeth Stakes.

The winner was the Hamdan Al Maktoum's Taghrooda, a three-year-old bay filly trained at Newmarket, Suffolk by John Gosden and ridden by Paul Hanagan. Taghrooda's victory was the first for her jockey and the second for Gosden after Nathaniel in 2011. Hamdan Al Maktoum had previously won the race with Nashwan in 1989. Taghrooda was the first three-year-old filly to win the race since Pawneese in 1976.

== The contenders ==
The race attracted eight runners, five from England and three from Ireland. There were no challengers from continental Europe after the French colt Flintshire was withdrawn two days before the race. John Gosden fielded three runners: the Epsom Oaks winners Taghrooda, the King Edward VII Stakes winner Eagle Top and Romsdal, who had finished third in the Epsom Derby. The other British contenders were Mukhadram, the five-year-old winner of the Eclipse Stakes and the Michael Stoute-trained four-year-old Telescope, winner of the Hardwicke Stakes at Royal Ascot. Ireland was represented by the Breeders' Cup Turf winner Magician and the 2013 Irish Derby winner Trading Leather who was accompanied by his pacemaker Leitir Mor. Telescope was made the 5/2 favourite ahead of Taghrooda (7/2) Eagle Top (4/1) and Magician (9/2).

== The race ==
Leitir Mor set the pace as expected from Mukhadram and Telescope, followed by Romsdal, Trading Leather, Magician, Taghrooda and Eagle Top. When Leitir Mor began to weaken with half a mile to run Mukhadram went to the front and led the field into the straight from Telescope as Taghrooda began to make rapid progress. Mukhadram and Telescope engaged in a protracted struggle throughout the final quarter mile, but Taghrooda moved up on the outside to take the advantage inside the final furlong and drew away to win easily by three lengths. Telescope beat Mukhadram by a short head for second, with Eagle Top staying on to finish fourth. There was a gap of six lengths back to Trading Leather who finished fifth ahead of Magician and Romsdal, with Leitir Mor being ৳eased down in the closing stages to finish last of the eight runners.

== Race details ==
- Sponsor: QIPCO
- Purse: £1,047,639; First prize: £603,961
- Surface: Turf
- Going: Good
- Distance: 12 furlongs
- Number of runners: 8
- Winner's time: 2:28.13

== Full result ==
Pos.	Marg.	Horse (bred)	Age	Jockey	Trainer (Country)	Odds
1		Taghrooda (GB)	3	Paul Hanagan	John Gosden (GB)	7/2
2	3	Telescope (IRE)	4	Ryan Moore	Michael Stoute (GB)	5/2 fav
3	shd	Mukhadram (GB)	5	Dane O'Neill	William Haggas (GB)	12/1
4	1¾	Eagle Top (GB)	3	William Buick	John Gosden (GB)	4/1
5	6	Trading Leather (IRE)	4	Kevin Manning	Jim Bolger (IRE)	8/1
6	3	Magician (IRE)	4	Joseph O'Brien	Aidan O'Brien (IRE)	9/2
7	9	Romsdal (GB)	3	Richard Hughes	John Gosden (GB)	12/1
8	32	Leitir Mor (IRE)	4	Ronan Whelan	Jim Bolger (IRE)	100/1

- Abbreviations: nse = nose; nk = neck; shd = head; hd = head

== Winner's details ==
Further details of the winner, Taghrooda

- Sex: Filly
- Foaled: 27 January 2011
- Country: United Kingdom
- Sire: Sea The Stars; Dam: Ezima (Sadler's Wells)
- Owner: Hamdan Al Maktoum
- Breeder: Shadwell Stud

== Subsequent breeding careers ==
Leading progeny of participants in the 2014 King George VI and Queen Elizabeth Stakes.

=== Stallions ===
Magician (6th) - Cardini (3rd Champagne Stakes 2018)
Mukhadram (3rd) - Romsey (3rd Premio Dormello 2019)
Telescope (2nd) - Minor flat runners
Eagle Top (4th) - Exported to Czech Republic
Leitir Mor (8th) - Exported to India

=== Broodmare ===
Taghrooda (1st) - Minor flat winner
