= 1987 King George VI and Queen Elizabeth Stakes =

Horse race held at Ascot Racecourse in 1987

37th King George VI and Queen Elizabeth Stakes
- King George VI and Queen Elizabeth Stakes
- Location: Ascot Racecourse
- Date: 25 July 1987
- Winning horse: Reference Point (GB)
- Jockey: Steve Cauthen
- Trainer: Henry Cecil (GB)
- Owner: Louis Freedman

The 1987 King George VI and Queen Elizabeth Stakes was a horse race held at Ascot Racecourse on Saturday 25 July 1987. It was the 37th running of the King George VI and Queen Elizabeth Stakes.

The winner was Louis Freedman's Reference Point, a three-year-old bay colt trained at Newmarket, Suffolk by Henry Cecil and ridden by the American jockey Steve Cauthen. Reference Point's victory was the first in the race for his owner, trainer and jockey.

== The contenders ==
The race attracted a field of nine runners, six trained in the United Kingdom, one from France, one from Italy and one from Germany. The favourite was Reference Point, a three-year-old colt who had won the Racing Post Trophy, Dante Stakes and Epsom Derby. The French challenger was the five-year-old mare Triptych a winner of five Group One races whilst Germany was represented by Acatenango who had twice been voted German Horse of the Year. The Italian colt Tony Bin started a 100/1 outsider despite Group One wins in the Premio Presidente della Repubblica and the Gran Premio di Milano. The two three-year-old in the race were Unite who had won the Epsom Oaks and the Irish Oaks, and Bourbon Girl, who had finished runner-up to Unite in both races. The other runners were Moon Madness (St Leger Stakes, Grand Prix de Saint-Cloud), Celestial Storm (Princess of Wales's Stakes) and Sir Harry Lewis (Irish Derby). A notable absentee was Mtoto, who had beaten Reference Point and Triptych in the Eclipse Stakes, but was withdrawn from the race because of the prevailing soft ground. Reference Point headed the betting at odds of 11/2 with Celestial Storm and Triptych joint second-favorites at 5/1 ahead of Unite (13/2) and Sir Harry Lewis (10/1).

== The race ==
Steve Cauthen sent Reference Point into the lead from the start and set the pace from Acatenango, Sir Harry Lewis and Unite and the same order was maintained into the straight. Approaching the last quarter mile the favourite began to draw away from his opponents as Triptych and Celestial Storm made progress from the rear. Reference Point was never seriously challenged and won by three lengths and a neck from Celestial Storm and Triptych. There was a gap of five lengths back to Moon Madness, who took fourth place ahead of Tony Bin, Acatenango and Sir Harry Lewis. Unite and Bourbon Girl were fifteen lengths back in eighth and ninth.

== Race details ==
- Sponsor: De Beers
- First prize: £182,790
- Surface: Turf
- Going: Soft
- Distance: 12 furlongs
- Number of runners: 9
- Winner's time: 2:34.63

== Full result ==
| Pos. | Marg. | Horse (bred) | Age | Jockey | Trainer (Country) | Odds |
|---|---|---|---|---|---|---|
| 1 | | Reference Point (GB) | 3 | Steve Cauthen | Henry Cecil (GB) | 11/10 fav |
| 2 | 3 | Celestial Storm (USA) | 4 | Ray Cochrane | Luca Cumani (GB) | 5/1 |
| 3 | nk | Triptych (USA) | 5 | Tony Cruz | Patrick Biancone (FR) | 5/1 |
| 4 | 5 | Moon Madness (GB) | 4 | Tony Ives | John Dunlop (GB) | 25/1 |
| 5 | hd | Tony Bin (IRE) | 4 | M. Jerome | Luigi Camici (ITY) | 100/1 |
| 6 | ¾ | Acatenango (GER) | 5 | Cash Asmussen | Heinz Jentzsch (GER) | 18/1 |
| 7 | shd | Sir Harry Lewis (USA) | 3 | John Reid | Barry Hills (GB) | 10/1 |
| 8 | 15 | Unite (IRE) | 3 | Walter Swinburn | Michael Stoute (GB) | 13/2 |
| 9 | | Bourbon Girl (GB) | 3 | Pat Eddery | Barry Hills (GB) | 40/1 |

- Abbreviations: nse = nose; nk = neck; shd = head; hd = head; dist = distance; UR = unseated rider

== Winner's details ==
Further details of the winner, Reference Point

- Sex: Colt
- Foaled: 26 February 1984
- Country: United Kingdom
- Sire: Mill Reef; Dam: Home On The Range (Habitat)
- Owner: Louis Freedman
- Breeder: Louis Freedman
