= 2022 King George VI and Queen Elizabeth Stakes =

72nd running of the King George VI and Queen Elizabeth Stakes

72nd King George VI and Queen Elizabeth Stakes
- King George VI and Queen Elizabeth Stakes
- Location: Ascot Racecourse
- Date: 23 July 2022
- Winning horse: Pyledriver
- Starting price: 18/1
- Jockey: P. J. McDonald
- Trainer: William Muir & Chris Grassick
- Owner: La Pyle Partnership
- Conditions: Good to firm

The 2022 King George VI and Queen Elizabeth Stakes was a horse race run at Ascot Racecourse on Saturday 23 July 2022. It was the 72nd running of the King George VI and Queen Elizabeth Stakes.

== The contenders ==
The race attracted a field of six runners, four from England and one each from Germany and Ireland.

The favourite was Westover, a three-year-old colt who finished third in the 2022 Epsom Derby, making up ground late in the race after an obstructed progress, and who went on to win the Irish Derby by seven lengths. Second favourite was the three-year-old filly Emily Upjohn, who was just beaten in the Epsom Oaks after stumbling at the start of the race and who was prevented from running in the Irish Oaks when the plane she was due to fly to Ireland in was grounded. The most-favoured contender of the older horses in the race was Mishriff, winner of the Prix du Jockey Club in 2020, the International Stakes in 2021 and who had finished second in the Eclipse Stakes on his most recent run. Germany was represented by Torquator Tasso, winner of three Group One races including the 2022 Prix de l'Arc de Triomphe, while Aidan O'Brien's Ballydoyle stable was responsible for Ireland's entry, Broome, the winner of the 2021 Grand Prix de Saint-Cloud and who had won the Hardwicke Stakes at Royal Ascot on his most recent appearance. The six-runner field was completed by Pyledriver, the 2021 Coronation Cup winner.

== Race details ==
- Sponsor: QIPCO
- Purse: £1,250,000; First prize: £708,875
- Surface: Turf
- Going: Good to Firm
- Distance: 12 furlongs
- Number of runners: 6
- Winner's time:2:29.49

== Full result ==
| Pos. | Marg. | Horse (bred) | Age | Jockey | Trainer (Country) | Odds |
|---|---|---|---|---|---|---|
| 1 | | Pyledriver (GB) | 5 | P. J. McDonald | William Muir & Chris Grassick (GB) | 18/1 |
| 2 | 2¾ | Torquator Tasso (GER) | 5 | Rene Piechulek | Marcel Weiss (GER) | 16/1 |
| 3 | 8 | Mishriff (IRE) | 5 | James Doyle | John & Thady Gosden (GB) | 5/2 |
| 4 | 1¼ | Broome (IRE) | 6 | Ryan Moore | Aidan O'Brien (IRE) | 18/1 |
| 5 | 6 | Westover (GB) | 3 | Colin Keane | Ralph Beckett (GB) | 13/8 fav |
| 6 | 7 | Emily Upjohn (GB) | 3 | Frankie Dettori | John & Thady Gosden (GB) | 3/1 |

== Winner's details ==
Further details of the winner,

- Sex: Horse
- Foaled: 14 March 2017
- Country: United Kingdom
- Sire: Harbour Watch
- Owner: La Pyle Partnership
- Breeder: Knox & Wells Limited & R. Devlin

== See also ==
- 2022 British Champions Series
