= 1983 King George VI and Queen Elizabeth Stakes =

British horse race

33rd King George VI and Queen Elizabeth Stakes
- King George VI and Queen Elizabeth Stakes
- Location: Ascot Racecourse
- Date: 23 July 1983
- Winning horse: Time Charter(IRE)
- Jockey: Joe Mercer
- Trainer: Henry Candy (GB)
- Owner: Robert Barnett

The 1983 King George VI and Queen Elizabeth Stakes was a horse race held at Ascot Racecourse on Saturday 23 July 1983. It was the 33rd running of the King George VI and Queen Elizabeth Stakes.

The winner was Robert Barnett's Time Charter, a four-year-old bay filly trained at Kingstone Warren in Oxfordshire by Henry Candy and ridden by the veteran British jockey Joe Mercer. Time Charter's victory was the first in the race for her owner and trainer. Mercer had previously won the race with Brigadier Gerard in 1972. Time Charter was the first female to win the race since Pawneese in 1976 and the last to do so until Danedream won in 2012.

== The contenders ==
The race attracted a field of nine runners, five trained in the United Kingdom, two in France and two in Ireland. The joint favourites were the Dick Hern-trained Sun Princess, a three-year-old filly who had won the Epsom Oaks by twelve lengths and the Irish-trained colt Caerleon, the winner of the Prix du Jockey Club. France was represented by the five-year-old Lemhi Gold a multiple Grade I winner when trained in the United States, and the six-year-old Prix Ganay winner Lancastrian. Apart from Sun Princess, the best of the British contenders appeared to be Time Charter, a filly who had won the Epsom Oaks, Sun Chariot Stakes and Champion Stakes in 1982. The other British-trained runners were Diamond Shoal (Gran Premio di Milano, Grand Prix de Saint-Cloud), Awaasif (Yorkshire Oaks) and the 150/1 outsider. The most notable absentees were Teenoso, who was being trained for the St Leger Stakes, and Shareef Dancer who had easily defeated Caerleon and Teenoso in the Irish Derby. Caerleon and Sun Princess headed the betting at odds of 9/4 ahead of Time Charter (5/1), Diamond Shoal (8/1) and Awaasif (15/1).

== The race ==
Lemhi Gold went to the front shortly after the start and set the pace from Awaasif, Diamond Shoal, Sun Princess and Caerleon with Time Charter towards the back of the field. Diamond Shoal overtook Lemhi Gold with three furlongs left to run and led the field into the straight, at which point Caerleon began to struggle and drop back. With two furlongs left to run Diamond Shoal held a clear advantage from Awaasif and Sun Princess, with Time Charter making rapid progress on the outside. Diamond Shoal was still ahead at the furlong pole but was then overtaken by Time Charter who won by three quarters of a length with Sun Princess a length away in third ahead of Awaasif. There was a gap of five lengths back to Lancastrian in fifth and further long gaps back to Carlingford Castle, Rocamadour and Lemhi Gold. Caerleon finished last after being virtually pulled up by Eddery in the closing stages.

== Race details ==
- Sponsor: De Beers
- First prize: £133,851
- Surface: Turf
- Going: Good to Firm
- Distance: 12 furlongs
- Number of runners: 9
- Winner's time: 2:30.79

== Full result ==
Pos.	Marg.	Horse (bred)	Age	Jockey	Trainer (Country)	Odds
1		Time Charter (IRE)	4	Joe Mercer	Henry Candy (GB)	5/1
2	¾	Diamond Shoal (GB)	4	Lester Piggott	Ian Balding (GB)	8/1
3	1	Sun Princess (IRE)	3	Willie Carson	Dick Hern (GB)	9/4 jt fav
4	2	Awaasif (CAN)	4	Bruce Raymond	John Dunlop (GB)	15/1
5	5	Lancastrian (IRE)	6	Alain Lequeux	David Smaga (FR)	33/1
6	3	Carlingford Castle (IRE)	3	Greville Starkey	Liam Browne (IRE)	25/1
7	10	Rocamadour (IRE)	4	Brian Rouse	Arthur Pitt (GB)	150/1
8	2	Lemhi Gold (USA)	5	Freddy Head	Olivier Douieb (FR)	16/1
9		Caerleon (USA)	3	Pat Eddery	Vincent O'Brien (IRE)	9/4 jt fav

- Abbreviations: nse = nose; nk = neck; shd = head; hd = head; dist = distance; UR = unseated rider

== Winner's details ==
Further details of the winner, Time Charter

- Sex: Filly
- Foaled: 6 April 1979
- Country: Ireland
- Sire: Saritamer; Dam: Centrocon (High Line)
- Owner: Robert Barnett
- Breeder: W & R Barnett
