= 2006 King George VI and Queen Elizabeth Stakes =

56th King George VI and Queen Elizabeth Stakes
- King George VI and Queen Elizabeth Stakes
- Location: Ascot Racecourse
- Date: 29 July 2006
- Winning horse: Hurricane Run (IRE)
- Jockey: Christophe Soumillon
- Trainer: André Fabre (FR)
- Owner: Michael Tabor

The 2006 King George VI and Queen Elizabeth Stakes was a horse race held at Ascot Racecourse on Saturday 29 July 2006. It was the 56th King George VI and Queen Elizabeth Stakes.

The winner was Michael Tabor's Hurricane Run, a four-year-old bay colt trained in France by André Fabre and ridden by Christophe Soumillon. Hurricane Run's victory was the first in the race for his trainer and jockey. Michael Tabor had won the race in 2000 with Montjeu and had owned the 2001 winner Galileo in partnership with Susan Magnier.

== The race ==
The race attracted six runners but no three-year-olds. The Godolphin stable fielded two runners: Electrocutionist, originally trained in Italy, had won the Gran Premio di Milano and the International Stakes in 2005 before taking the Dubai World Cup in March 2006 while Cherry Mix, a French-bred horse who had been narrowly beaten in the 2004 Prix de l'Arc de Triomphe and won the Gran Premio del Jockey Club in the following year was expected to act as a pacemaker for his stable companion. Japan sent Heart's Cry, a five-year-old who had defeated Deep Impact in the Arima Kinen and won the Dubai Sheema Classic in Dubai. France was represented by Hurricane Run, whose wins included the Irish Derby and the Prix de l'Arc de Triomphe in 2005. He had won the Tattersalls Gold Cup on his four-year-old debut but had then been narrowly beaten by the mare Pride when odds-on favourite for the Grand Prix de Saint-Cloud. The two remaining runners, both trained in Britain, were the Hardwicke Stakes winner Maraahel and the 50/1 outsider Enforcer. Hurricane Run headed the betting at odds of 5/6 ahead of Heart's Cry (3/1) and Electrocutionist (4/1).

As expected, Cherry Mix set the pace from Hurricane Run followed by Heart's Cry, Electrocutionist, Maraahel and Enforcer. On the turn into the straight, Cherry Mix still led the field, but Dettori moved Electrocutionist into second as Hurricane Run appeared to be struggling. Electrocutionist took the lead from Cherry Mix but was quickly overtaken by Heart's Cry on the outside approaching the final furlong as Hurricane Run began to produce a strong late run against the rail. In the last 100 yards Hurricane Run took the lead and won by half a length from Electrocutionist with Heart's Cry a further half length away in third. The leading trio were followed home by Enforcer, Maraahel and Cherry Mix.

== Race details ==
- Sponsor: De Beers
- Purse: £738,550; First prize: £425,850
- Surface: Turf
- Going: Good to Firm
- Distance: 12 furlongs
- Number of runners: 6
- Winner's time: 2:30.29

== Full result ==
Pos.	Marg.	Horse (bred)	Age	Jockey	Trainer (Country)	Odds
1		Hurricane Run (IRE)	4	Christophe Soumillon	André Fabre (FR)	5/6 fav
2	½	Electrocutionist (USA)	5	Frankie Dettori	Saeed bin Suroor (GB)	4/1
3	½	Heart's Cry (JPN)	5	Christophe Lemaire	Kojiro Hashiguchi (JPN)	3/1
4	1¾	Enforcer (GB)	4	Martin Dwyer	William Muir (GB)	50/1
5	1½	Maraahel (IRE)	5	Richard Hills	Michael Stoute (GB)	14/1
6	½	Cherry Mix (FR)	5	Kerrin McEvoy	Saeed bin Suroor (GB)	50/1

- Abbreviations: nse = nose; nk = neck; shd = head; hd = head

== Winner's details ==
Further details of the winner, Hurricane Run

- Sex: Colt
- Foaled: 13 April 2002
- Country: Ireland
- Sire: Montjeu; Dam: Hold On (Surumu)
- Owner: Michael Tabor
- Breeder: Gestut Ammerland
