= 2015 King George VI and Queen Elizabeth Stakes =

65th King George VI and Queen Elizabeth Stakes
- King George VI and Queen Elizabeth Stakes
- Postponed Eagle Top Romsdal
- Location: Ascot Racecourse
- Date: 25 July 2015
- Winning horse: Postponed (IRE)
- Jockey: Andrea Atzeni
- Trainer: Luca Cumani (GB)
- Owner: Mohammed Obaid Al Maktoum

The 2015 King George VI and Queen Elizabeth Stakes was a horse race held at Ascot Racecourse on Saturday 25 July 2015. It was the 65th King George VI and Queen Elizabeth Stakes.

The winner was Mohammed Obaid Al Maktoum's Postponed, a four-year-old bay colt trained at Newmarket, Suffolk by Luca Cumani and ridden by Andrea Atzeni. Postponed's victory was the first in the race for his owner, trainer and jockey.

== The contenders ==
The race attracted seven runners, six from England and one from Italy. The race was hit by several late withdrawals: the 2014 runner-up Telescope was taken out of the race following an injury and there were no challengers from France after Flintshire was withdrawn on the day before the race. The most notable absentee however, was the Epsom Derby winner Golden Horn who was withdrawn a few hours before post time by his trainer John Gosden who felt that the prevailing soft, sticky ground would not suit the colt. Even without the Derby winner, Gosden's stable was strongly represented fielding the King Edward VII Stakes winner Eagle Top and Romsdal, who had finished third in the 2014 Epsom Derby. The other British contenders were the Michael Stoute-trained four-year-old Snow Sky, winner of the Hardwicke Stakes at Royal Ascot, the seven-year-old gelding Clever Cookie (Ormonde Stakes, Postponed (Great Voltigeur Stakes, and the filly Madame Chiang. The Italian challenger was Dylan Mouth who had won nine of his ten races including the (Gran Premio del Jockey Club and the Gran Premio di Milano. The key trial appeared to be the Hardwicke Stakes, in which Snow Sky had defeated Postponed and Eagle Top. Madame Chiang and Dylan Mouth were the only previous Group One winners in the field.

Eagle Top was made the 5/2 favourite ahead of Snow Sky (3/1) Clever Cookie (4/1) and Postponed (6/1). Madame Chiang started at 8/1 with Dylan Mouth on 10/1 and Romsdal being made the 12/1 outsider.

== The race ==
Romsdal went into the lead soon after the start and set the pace from Postponed, Snow Sky and Dylan Mouth. Madame Chiang settled in fifth ahead of Eagle Top, with Clever Cookie, who appeared to be struggling to match the pace of the others, in last place. The order remained the same until the straight where Dylan Mouth began to tire and drifted to the left, forcing Eagle Top, who was beginning to make rapid progress, to the far outside. Postponed overtook Romsdal two furlongs out and went for home along the inside rail. Snow Sky and Madame Chiang were unable to quicken, but Eagle Top maintained his momentum on the outside, and moved level with the leader entering the final furlong. Eagle Top gained the advantage 100 yards from the finish but Postponed rallied strongly and the two four-year-old colts crossed the line together. The photo finish showed that Postponed had prevailed by a nose (the narrowest possible margin) with a gap of almost four lengths back to Romsdal in third. Madame Chiang took fourth ahead of Clever Cookie and Snow Sky, with Dylan Mouth eight lengths drift in last place.

== Race details ==
- Sponsor: QIPCO
- Purse: £1,195,196; First prize: £689,027
- Surface: Turf
- Going: Soft
- Distance: 12 furlongs
- Number of runners: 7
- Winner's time: 2:31.25

== Full result ==
Pos.	Marg.	Horse (bred)	Age	Jockey	Trainer (Country)	Odds
1		Postponed (IRE)	4	Andrea Atzeni	Luca Cumani (GB)	6/1
2	nse	Eagle Top (GB)	4	Frankie Dettori	John Gosden (GB)	5/2 fav
3	3¾	Romsdal (GB)	4	William Buick	John Gosden (GB)	12/1
4	2	Madame Chiang (GB)	4	William Buick	David Simcock (GB)	8/1
5	¾	Clever Cookie (IRE)	7	Graham Lee	Peter Niven (GB)	4/1
6	nk	Snow Sky (GB)	4	Pat Smullen	Michael Stoute (GB)	3/1
7	8	Dylan Mouth (IRE)	4	Fabio Branca	Stefano Botti (ITA)	10/1

- Abbreviations: nse = nose; nk = neck; shd = head; hd = head

== Winner's details ==
Further details of the winner, Postponed

- Sex: Colt
- Foaled: 4 April 2011
- Country: Ireland
- Sire: Dubawi; Dam: Ever Rigg (Dubai Destination)
- Owner: Mohammed Obaid Al Maktoum
- Breeder: St Albans Bloodstock

== Subsequent breeding careers ==
Leading progeny of participants in the 2015 King George VI and Queen Elizabeth Stakes.

=== Stallions ===
Postponed (1st) - Offspring yet to race
Snow Sky (6th) - Offspring yet to race
Dylan Mouth (7th) - Standing in England
Eagle Top (2nd) - Exported to Czech Republic

=== Broodmare ===
Madame Chiang (4th) - Minor flat winner
