= 2012 King George VI and Queen Elizabeth Stakes =

62nd King George VI and Queen Elizabeth Stakes
- King George VI and Queen Elizabeth Stakes
- Danedream Nathaniel St Nicholas Abbey
- Location: Ascot Racecourse
- Date: 21 July 2012
- Winning horse: Danedream (GER)
- Jockey: Andrasch Starke
- Trainer: Peter Schiergen (GER)
- Owner: Gestut Burg Eberstein & Teruya Yoshida

The 2012 King George VI and Queen Elizabeth Stakes was a horse race held at Ascot Racecourse on Saturday 21 July 2012. It was the 62nd King George VI and Queen Elizabeth Stakes.

The winner was Gestut Burg Eberstein & Teruya Yoshida's Danedream, a four-year-old bay filly trained in Germany by Peter Schiergen and ridden by Andrasch Starke. Danedream's victory was the first for his jockey, trainer and owner and the first by a German-trained horse. Danedream was the first female to win the race since Time Charter in 1983.

Danedream was the European Champion Three-year-old Filly of 2011 when her win included the Oaks d'Italia, Grosser Preis von Berlin, Grosser Preis von Baden and Prix de l'Arc de Triomphe. After winning on her debut as a four-year-old she had failed to show her best form when finishing fourth in the Grand Prix de Saint-Cloud in June. In the 2012 King George VI and Queen Elizabeth Stakes, Danedream started the 9/1 fifth choice in the betting behind Sea Moon, Nathaniel (the previous year's winner), St Nicholas Abbey and the Melbourne Cup winner Dunaden. Danedream produced a sustained run in the straight to catch Nathaniel 75 yards from the finish and won by a nose, with St Nicholas Abbey one and a half lengths back in third.

This was the last running of the race (until at least 2017) to be shown on the BBC, who had televised every running since the race's inception in 1951.

== Race details ==
- Sponsor: Betfair
- Purse: £983,700; First prize: £567,100
- Surface: Turf
- Going: Good to Soft
- Distance: 12 furlongs
- Number of runners: 10
- Winner's time: 2:31.62

== Full result ==
Pos.	Marg.	Horse (bred)	Age	Jockey	Trainer (Country)	Odds
1		Danedream (GER)	4	Andrasch Starke	Peter Schiergen (GER)	9/1
2	nse	Nathaniel (IRE)	4	William Buick	John Gosden (GB)	5/2
3	1½	St Nicholas Abbey (IRE)	5	Joseph O'Brien	Aidan O'Brien (IRE)	5/1
4	hd	Reliable Man (GB)	4	Olivier Peslier	Alain de Royer-Dupré (FR)	20/1
5	½	Sea Moon (GB)	4	Ryan Moore	Michael Stoute (GB)	2/1 fav
6	1¼	Dunaden (FR)	6	Craig Williams	Mikel Delzangles (FR)	8/1
7	½	Brown Panther (GB)	4	Kieren Fallon	Tom Dascombe (GB)	20/1
8	10	Deep Brillante (JPN)	3	Yasunari Iwata	Yoshito Yahagi (JPN)	20/1
9	½	Masked Marvel (GB)	4	Frankie Dettori	John Gosden (GB)	25/1
10	40	Robin Hood (IRE)	4	Seamie Heffernan	Aidan O'Brien (IRE)	100/1

- Abbreviations: nse = nose; nk = neck; shd = head; hd = head

== Winner's details ==
Further details of the winner, Danedream

- Sex: Filly
- Foaled: 7 May 2008
- Country: Germany
- Sire: Lomitas; Dam: Danedrop (Danehill)
- Owner: Gestut Burg Eberstein & Teruya Yoshida
- Breeder: Gestut Brummerhof

== Subsequent breeding careers ==
Leading progeny of participants in the 2012 King George VI and Queen Elizabeth Stakes.

=== Sires of Classic winners ===
Nathaniel (2nd)

- Enable – 1st Epsom Oaks (2017), 1st Irish Oaks (2017), Horse of the Year (2017, 2019)
- Channel – 1st Prix de Diane (2019)
- God Given – 1st Premio Lydia Tesio (2018)
- Concertista – 1st Dawn Run Mares' Novices' Hurdle (2020)

=== Sires of Group/Grade One winners ===
Reliable Man (4th)

- Sentimental Miss – 1st New Zealand Oaks (2019)
- Miami Bound – 1st Kennedy Oaks (2019)
- Naida – 2nd Preis der Diana (2019)

=== Other Stallions ===
Deep Brillante (8th) – Mozu Bello (1st Nikkei Shinshun Hai 2020)
Dunaden (6th) – Minor flat and jumps winners
Masked Marvel (9th) – Minor jumps winners
Sea Moon (5th) – Minor flat runner

=== Broodmare ===
Danedream (1st) – Faylaq (4th Cumberland Lodge Stakes 2019)
