= Terimon =

British-bred Thoroughbred racehorse

- Sire: Bustino
- Grandsire: Busted
- Dam: Nicholas Grey
- Damsire: Track Spare
- Sex: Stallion
- Foaled: 20 April 1986
- Country: Great Britain
- Colour: Grey
- Breeder: Hesmonds Stud
- Owner: Lady Beaverbrook
- Trainer: Clive Brittain
- Record: 31: 4-7-4
- Earnings: £498,150

Major wins
- Earl of Sefton Stakes (1990, 1991); International Stakes (1991)

Awards
- European Champion Older Horse 1991
- Last updated on June 22, 2007

Terimon (20 April 1986–16 September 2008) was a British Thoroughbred racehorse and sire. His most successful year was 1991, when he won the International Stakes at York and was named European Champion Older Horse at the inaugural Cartier Racing Awards. He is best known, however, for his performance in the 1989 Derby in which he finished second at odds of 500/1, the longest ever recorded for a placed horse in the race.

== Background ==
Terimon was a grey horse, standing 16 hands high, bred by the Hesmonds Stud in East Sussex in 1986. His sire Bustino was the best horse to race in the colours of Terimon's owner, Lady Beaverbrook. Bustino was a notable influence for stamina, being the sire of the Ascot Gold Cup winner Paean and the Coronation Cup winner Easter Sun. His dam, Nicholas Grey, from whom he inherited his colour, won the Listed Premio Carlo Chiesa and was placed in the Oaks d'Italia.

Lady Beaverbrook was considered an eccentric character who gave most of her horses names consisting of one word with seven letters (Bustino, Relkino, Terimon, Boldboy, Niniski, Mystiko, Petoski), as this was the most common form for Derby winners.

He was trained throughout his career by Clive Brittain at Newmarket, Suffolk. His most regular jockey was Michael Roberts who rode him in 21 of his 31 starts.

== Racing career ==
=== 1988: two-year-old season ===
Terimon raced four times in 1988 without success, his nearest approach to victory coming when he was beaten a head in a maiden race at Newbury. He was campaigned ambitiously however; on his final race he ran in the Group One Middle Park Stakes, finishing last of the six runners.

=== 1989: three-year-old season ===
Terimon began his three-year-old career with three more defeats, although he showed some ability by finishing second in the Group Three Sandown Classic Trial. On his eighth start, he recorded his first win, taking the lead close to the finish in a maiden race at Leicester.

Terimon was the most experienced runner in the 1989 Epsom Derby, but he had apparently been exposed as being well below top class and started the complete outsider of the twelve runners at 500/1. The clear favourite for the race was Nashwan, the winner of the 2000 Guineas and the only horse seriously supported against him was Cacoethes, the easy winner of the Lingfield Derby Trial. Clive Brittain was well aware that his colt had no chance of beating Nashwan, and had entered him in the race with the intention of reaching a place. Cacoethes took the lead in the straight and was soon challenged by Nashwan. The two favourites raced together for a few strides, before Nashwan pulled away. Michael Roberts made steady headway on Terimon, moving up through the field to catch the tiring Cacoethes in the closing stages and finish second, five lengths behind Nashwan.

In his two other starts of the year, Terimon failed to win, but confirmed that he was a Group class performer by finishing second in the Great Voltigeur Stakes and fourth in the St Leger.

=== 1990: four-year-old season ===
On this first start of 1990, Terimon won his first important race, when he produced a strong finish to lead in the last strides and take the Group Three Earl of Sefton Stakes at Newmarket Racecourse. He had once again been ignored in the betting, starting at 20/1.

He failed to win in his other six races that year, but finished second in the Eclipse Stakes and third in the Prince of Wales's Stakes at Royal Ascot.

=== 1991: five-year-old season ===
Terimon had his best year in 1991, starting with a repeat win in the Earl of Sefton Stakes, this time as 7/2 favourite. He went on to finish a close second to In the Groove in the Coronation Cup and third to Stagecraft in the Prince of Wales's Stakes.

He was well beaten in the Eclipse Stakes (behind Environment Friend) and the King George VI and Queen Elizabeth Stakes (behind Generous) before being sent to York for the International Stakes. He was made the 16/1 outsider of the six runners, with the leading contenders being Stagecraft, Environment Friend and the 1990 Derby winner Quest For Fame. Roberts sent Terimon into an early lead and set a slow pace before accelerating in the straight. Although his rivals had every chance, Terimon was never in serious danger and won by two lengths to record his biggest win. It was to be the only Group One win by an older male in Britain in 1991.

In his remaining two starts he was unplaced in the Champion Stakes and the Japan Cup.

=== 1992: six-year-old season ===
Terimon failed to produce his best form as a six-year-old. His best run in five races came on his debut, when he finished a close third in the Coronation Cup.

At the end of the season he was retired to stud.

== Assessment ==
Most of the open-age Group One races in 1991 were won by three-year-olds, with the classic generation including Generous, Suave Dancer, Sheikh Albadou, Marling, Selkirk, Hector Protector and many other top class performers. Terimon's win at York was therefore enough to secure him the title of European Champion Older Horse in the inaugural Cartier Racing Awards.

Terimon was rated 124 by Timeform

== Stud career ==
Less than three years after his retirement, Terimon's death was announced by Weatherbys, which came as a surprise to the staff at the Barton Stud at Bury St Edmunds where he was standing as a stallion. The death report was a result of a clerical error, and Terimon was actually "fine and in good form."

In 2000, he was moved to the Shade Oak Stud in Shropshire.

Terimon sired the winners of over 100 races, with most of his success being as a sire of National Hunt runners. He is the damsire of the 2012 Triumph Hurdle winner Countrywide Flame and the Arkle Challenge Trophy winner Simonsig.

== Pedigree ==
Pedigree of Terimon (GB), grey stallion, 1986
Sire Bustino (GB) 1971	Busted; 1963	Crepello	Donatello
Sire Bustino (GB) 1971	Busted; 1963	Crepello	Crepuscule
Sire Bustino (GB) 1971	Busted; 1963	Sans Le Sou	Vimy
Sire Bustino (GB) 1971	Busted; 1963	Sans Le Sou	Martial Loan
Sire Bustino (GB) 1971	Ship Yard; 1963	Doutelle	Prince Chevalier
Sire Bustino (GB) 1971	Ship Yard; 1963	Doutelle	Above Board
Sire Bustino (GB) 1971	Ship Yard; 1963	Paving Stone	Fairway
Sire Bustino (GB) 1971	Ship Yard; 1963	Paving Stone	Rosetta
Dam Nicholas Grey (GB) 1976	Track Spare; 1963	Sound Track	Whistler
Dam Nicholas Grey (GB) 1976	Track Spare; 1963	Sound Track	Bridle Way
Dam Nicholas Grey (GB) 1976	Track Spare; 1963	Rosy Myth	Nearco
Dam Nicholas Grey (GB) 1976	Track Spare; 1963	Rosy Myth	Rosy Dolly
Dam Nicholas Grey (GB) 1976	Rosy Morn; 1970	Roan Rocket	Buisson Ardent
Dam Nicholas Grey (GB) 1976	Rosy Morn; 1970	Roan Rocket	Farandole
Dam Nicholas Grey (GB) 1976	Rosy Morn; 1970	Golden Pride	Golden Cloud
Dam Nicholas Grey (GB) 1976	Rosy Morn; 1970	Golden Pride	Peut-Etre (Family: 7-a)
