= Warrsan =

Irish-bred Thoroughbred racehorse

- Racing silks of Saeed Manana
- Sire: Caerleon
- Grandsire: Nijinsky
- Dam: Lucayan Princess
- Damsire: High Line
- Sex: Stallion
- Foaled: 1998
- Country: Ireland
- Colour: Bay
- Breeder: Saeed Manana
- Owner: Saeed Manana
- Trainer: Clive Brittain
- Record: 43: 9-9-4
- Earnings: £1,654,749

Major wins
- John Porter Stakes (2003); Jockey Club Stakes (2003); Coronation Cup (2003, 2004); Grosser Preis von Baden (2004, 2005)
- Last updated on 11 May 2007

Warrsan (28 February 1998 – 19 June 2006) was a thoroughbred racehorse foaled in Ireland who competed in Europe and Asia. He notably won two successive runnings of the Coronation Cup at Epsom.

== Background ==
Owned and bred by Saeed Manana of the United Arab Emirates, he was sired by Caerleon, a son of Nijinsky, and out of the mare, Lucayan Princess.

Conditioned by veteran trainer Clive Brittain, throughout his life Warrsan was a difficult horse to handle.

== Racing career ==
His best racing results came late, beginning at age four in 2002 when he had two second-place finishes in the Group 3 Cumberland Lodge Stakes and St. Simon Stakes. The following year, the five-year-old horse began to blossom as a solid competitor, winning the 2003 Group 3 John Porter Stakes in April then a few weeks later the Group 2 Jockey Club Stakes. However, his most important win of the year came at Epsom Downs in June's Coronation Cup, a Group 1 race that attracts the best older horses in the country. Much traveled that year, Warrsan raced in Italy in the 2003 Group I Gran Premio di Milano where he ran second to Leadership. He had third-place finishes in the Gran Premio del Jockey Club in Italy, the Rheinland-Pokal in Germany and in the Hong Kong Vase at Sha Tin Racecourse.

In 2004, Warrsan became one of only five horses to win the Coronation Cup twice but then was beaten by Refuse To Bend in July's Eclipse Stakes at Sandown Park. In the fall, he won Germany's most prestigious race, the Grosser Preis von Baden at Iffezheim Racecourse in Baden-Baden. In 2005 he failed to win a record third Coronation Cup but in September won his second consecutive Grosser Preis von Baden. Out of the money in both October's Prix de l'Arc de Triomphe and November's Japan Cup, Warrsan was retired in April 2006. His connections had hoped to find him a place at stud but he reportedly died as a result of a tumor on June 19 at trainer Clive Brittain's yard.
