= Youmzain =

Irish-bred Thoroughbred racehorse

- Sire: Sinndar
- Dam: Sadima
- Damsire: Sadler's Wells
- Sex: Stallion
- Foaled: 2003
- Country: Ireland
- Colour: Bay
- Breeder: Frank Dunne
- Owner: Jaber Abdullah
- Trainer: Mick Channon
- Record: 26: 6-7-7
- Earnings: £3,193,567

Major wins
- Preis von Europa (2006); Grand Prix de Saint-Cloud (2008)
- Last updated on 25, October, 2008 (UTC)

Youmzain (foaled February 20, 2003 in Ireland) is a Thoroughbred racehorse. Trained by Mick Channon, he won Preis von Europa and Grand Prix de Saint-Cloud group 1 races in 2008. Most notably, he is a three-time runner-up in Prix de l'Arc de Triomphe; in 2007 behind Dylan Thomas, in 2008 behind Zarkava, and in 2009 behind Sea The Stars.

== Stud record ==
Youmzain sired Sea Calisi, winner of Beverly D. Stakes, Prix de Malleret and Sheepshead Bay Stakes, 3rd in Yorkshire Oaks, Prix Vermeille and Flower Bowl Stakes.
