= Michael Roberts (jockey) =

South African jockey

Michael Roberts (born 17 May 1954) is a South African jockey currently a trainer in South Africa. He lives with his wife Verna and two daughters, Melanie and Carolyn. Roberts has had a successful career, winning many English and South African races multiple times. He was British flat racing Champion Jockey in 1992. His most famous equine partner was the double Eclipse Stakes winner, Mtoto.
