= Belmez (horse) =

American-bred Thoroughbred racehorse (1987–1999)

- Racing colours of Sheikh Mohammed
- Sire: El Gran Senor
- Grandsire: Northern Dancer
- Dam: Grace Note
- Damsire: Top Ville
- Sex: Stallion
- Foaled: 10 January 1987
- Country: United States
- Colour: Bay
- Breeder: Darley Stud
- Owner: Sheikh Mohammed
- Trainer: Henry Cecil
- Record: 8: 5-0-1
- Earnings: £427,226

Major wins
- Chester Vase (1990); King George VI and Queen Elizabeth Stakes (1990); Great Voltigeur Stakes (1990); Timeform rating: 131
- Last updated on 29 July 2022

Belmez (10 January 1987 – 18 October 1999) was an American-bred, British-trained Thoroughbred racehorse best known for winning the 1990 King George VI and Queen Elizabeth Stakes as a three-year-old.

== Background ==
Belmez was a medium-sized, strongly built bay colt, with a prominent white stripe and a white sock on his off-fore leg. He was bred by Sheikh Mohammed's Darley Stud in the US, a product of the second crop of foals sired by El Gran Senor. He was trained throughout his career by Henry Cecil and ridden in most of his starts by Steve Cauthen.

== Racing career ==
Belmez began his racing career with an upset, winning the Carlsberg Stakes at Newmarket in November 1989 as an unconsidered 50-1 outsider. By the time he re-appeared as a three-year-old in the Burghclere Stakes in April 1990, his reputation preceded him, and he won "comfortably" by four lengths at odds of 4–5. Belmez was then moved up in class for the Chester Vase and defeated Quest for Fame by a length to become favourite for the Derby. An injury ruled Belmez out of the Derby which was won easily by Quest For Fame. Belmez returned with a third place to the filly Salsabil in the Irish Derby (with Quest For Fame fifth) and was then aimed at the King George VI and Queen Elizabeth Stakes.

Steve Cauthen, who had ridden Belmez in his previous four races, chose to partner Old Vic, with the ride on Belmez going to Mick Kinane. Such was the quality of the entry, that Belmez was the only three-year-old in the field, but he produced a career-best effort, moving up to contest the lead early in the straight and prevailing by a neck from his stablemate Old Vic, with top-class performers like Assatis, Cacoethes, In The Wings, Sapience, Terimon and Legal Case among the also-rans.

A month later Belmez won the Great Voltigeur Stakes, getting up on the line to beat the future St Leger winner Snurge by a short-head. He finished fifth behind Saumarez in the Prix de l'Arc de Triomphe and seventh behind Better Loosen Up in the Japan Cup before being retired to stud.

== Assessment ==
Belmez was given a rating of 132 by the Racing Post.

== Stud career ==
Belmez was retired initially to stand at the Queens stud in Norfolk, England but was later transferred to Haras du Pin in Normandy. He made little impact as a stallion, but he did sire one important winner in Caramba, winner of the Falmouth Stakes and Nassau Stakes. He is the damsire of the Racing Post Trophy winner Kingsbarns.

== Pedigree ==
Pedigree of Belmez (IRE), bay stallion, 1987
| Sire El Gran Senor | Northern Dancer | Nearctic | Nearco |
| Sire El Gran Senor | Northern Dancer | Nearctic | Lady Angela |
| Sire El Gran Senor | Northern Dancer | Natalma | Native Dancer |
| Sire El Gran Senor | Northern Dancer | Natalma | Almahmoud |
| Sire El Gran Senor | Sex Appeal | Buckpasser | Tom Fool |
| Sire El Gran Senor | Sex Appeal | Buckpasser | Busanda |
| Sire El Gran Senor | Sex Appeal | Best In Show | Traffic Judge |
| Sire El Gran Senor | Sex Appeal | Best In Show | Stolen Hour |
| Dam Grace Note | Top Ville | High Top | Derring-Do |
| Dam Grace Note | Top Ville | High Top | Camenae |
| Dam Grace Note | Top Ville | Segaville | Charlottesville |
| Dam Grace Note | Top Ville | Segaville | La Sega |
| Dam Grace Note | Val de Grace | Val de Loir | Vieux Manoir |
| Dam Grace Note | Val de Grace | Val de Loir | Vali |
| Dam Grace Note | Val de Grace | Pearly Queen | Fast Fox |
| Dam Grace Note | Val de Grace | Pearly Queen | Seed Pearl (Family: 16) |
