= Shemaka =

Irish-bred Thoroughbred racehorse

- Sire: Nishapour
- Grandsire: Zeddaan
- Dam: Shashna
- Damsire: Blakeney
- Sex: Mare
- Foaled: 21 March 1990
- Country: Ireland
- Colour: Bay
- Breeder: Aga Khan IV
- Owner: Aga Khan IV
- Trainer: Alain de Royer-Dupré
- Record: 7: 4-0-0
- Earnings: £211,714

Major wins
- Prix de Condé (1992); Prix de Diane (1993); Prix de la Nonette (1993)

Shemaka (foaled 21 March 1990) was an Irish-bred, French-trained Thoroughbred racehorse and broodmare. As a juvenile in 1992 she won two of her three races including the Prix de Condé. In the following year she was beaten on her debut but then recorded her biggest win in the Prix de Diane and went on to win the Prix de la Nonette. At the end of the year she was retired from racing and became a successful broodmare.

== Background ==
Shemaka was a bay mare with a white snip bred in Ireland by her owner, Aga Khan IV. She was sent into training with Alain de Royer-Dupré in France.

She was sired by Nishapour, a French stallion whose biggest win came in the 1978 Poule d'Essai des Poulains. As a breeding stallion, the best of his other progeny included Beauchamp King and the leading National Hunt performers Calapaez (Cleeve Hurdle) and First Bout (Triumph Hurdle). Shemaka's dam Shashna was an unraced half-sister to Shademah, the dam of Shahrastani.

== Racing career ==
=== 1992: two-year-old season ===
After running unplaced on her debut and then recording her first victory in a minor event Shemaka was stepped up in class and matched against male opposition in the Group 3 Prix de Condé over 1800 metres at Longchamp Racecourse 11 October. Ridden by William Mongil she took the lead 400 metres from the finish and won by three quarters of a length from Marchand de Sable, a colt who went on to win the Critérium de Saint-Cloud in November.

=== 1993: three-year-old season ===
On her first appearance as a three-year-old Shemaka was ridden by Mongil in the Prix Cléopâtre over 2100 metres on soft ground at Saint-Cloud Racecourse on 14 May. Starting at odds of 8.5/1 she was never in serious contention and came home fifth of the nine runners behind Wemyss Bight, Bright Moon, Alice Springs and Insijaam. Gerald Mosse over from Mongil on 13 June when the filly was stepped up to Group 1 class to contest the Prix de Diane at Chantilly Racecourse. She started at odds of 6.6/1 in a fourteen-runner field which included Bright Moon, Alice Springs, Dancienne (Prix des Chênes), Baya (Prix de la Grotte) and Corrazone (Prix Vanteaux). In a close finish, Shemaka prevailed by a neck from Baya, with Dancienne a length and a half away in third place.

After a break of over two months Shemaka returned in the Group 3 Prix de la Nonette at Deauville Racecourse on 29 August in which she was accompanied by her pacemaker Mouloudya and started the 11/10 favourite ahead of four other fillies, namely Baya, Viviana (second in the Prix de Psyché), Adored Slew (second in the Prix de Minerve) and the British challenger Talented. Ridden by Mosse and racing on good to firm ground, she won by half a length and a nose from Baya and Talented. On her final racecourse appearance Shemaka contested the Prix de l'Arc de Triomphe over 2400 metres at Longchamp on 3 October and, despite being made the 7.8/1 sixth choice in the betting, came home last of the 23 runners behind Urban Sea.

== Breeding record ==
At the end of her racing career, Shemaka was retired to become a broodmare for the Aga Khan's stud. She produced at least thirteen foals and six winners between 1996 and 2010:

- Shemaya, a brown filly, foaled in 1996, sired by Darshaan. Won two races including the Listed Prix Casimir Delamarre.
- Shemdani, bay colt (later gelded), 1997, by Unfuwain. Won six races.
- Shemissa, bay filly, 1998, by Fairy King. Unraced.
- Shemita, bay filly, 1999, by Sadler's Wells. Unraced.
- Shemala, bay filly, 2000, by Danehill. Won two races including Listed Prix Madame Jean Couturie. Grand-dam of Shakeel.
- Shezan, bay colt, 2002, by Darshaan. Failed to win in three races.
- Shemiyra, bay filly, 2003, by In The Wings. Unraced.
- Shemanikha, bay filly, 2004, by Sendawar. Unraced.
- Shemima, grey filly, 2005, by Dalakhani. Won three races including Prix de Lutèce and Prix Allez France.
- Shediyama, bay filly, 2006, by Red Ransom. Won one race.
- Star Value, bay filly, 2008, by Danehill Dancer. Unraced.
- Shamooda, bay filly, 2009, by Azamour. Won two races.
- Shelina, bay filly, 2010, by Dalakhani. Failed to win in three races.

== Pedigree ==
Pedigree of Shemaka (IRE), bay mare, 1990
Sire Nishapour (FR) 1975	Zeddaan (GB); 1965	Grey Sovereign	Nasrullah
Sire Nishapour (FR) 1975	Zeddaan (GB); 1965	Grey Sovereign	Kong
Sire Nishapour (FR) 1975	Zeddaan (GB); 1965	Vareta (FR)	Vilmorin (GB)
Sire Nishapour (FR) 1975	Zeddaan (GB); 1965	Vareta (FR)	Veronique
Sire Nishapour (FR) 1975	Alama (IRE); 1969	Aureole (GB)	Hyperion
Sire Nishapour (FR) 1975	Alama (IRE); 1969	Aureole (GB)	Angelola
Sire Nishapour (FR) 1975	Alama (IRE); 1969	Nucciolina (FR)	Nuccio (ITY)
Sire Nishapour (FR) 1975	Alama (IRE); 1969	Nucciolina (FR)	Mah Behar (GB)
Dam Shashna (IRE) 1982	Blakeney (GB); 1966	Hethersett	Hugh Lupus (FR)
Dam Shashna (IRE) 1982	Blakeney (GB); 1966	Hethersett	Bride Elect
Dam Shashna (IRE) 1982	Blakeney (GB); 1966	Windmill Girl	Hornbeam
Dam Shashna (IRE) 1982	Blakeney (GB); 1966	Windmill Girl	Chorus Beauty
Dam Shashna (IRE) 1982	Shamim; 1968	Le Haar (FR)	Vieux Manoir
Dam Shashna (IRE) 1982	Shamim; 1968	Le Haar (FR)	Mince Pie
Dam Shashna (IRE) 1982	Shamim; 1968	Diamond Drop (GB)	Charlottesville
Dam Shashna (IRE) 1982	Shamim; 1968	Diamond Drop (GB)	Martine (IRE) (Family: 3-o)
