= Prix de Malleret =

Flat horse race in France

- Class: Group 2
- Location: Saint-Cloud Racecourse; Saint-Cloud, France
- Race type: Flat / Thoroughbred
- Website: france-galop.com

Race information
- Distance: 2,400 metres (1½ miles)
- Surface: Turf
- Track: Left-handed
- Qualification: Three-year-old fillies exc. G1 winners this year
- Weight: 56 kg Penalties; 2 kg for Group 2 winners * 2 kg if two Group 3 wins * * since January 1
- Purse: €130,000 (2022); 1st: €74,100

Prix de Malleret
2026
Behrayna	Pink Panthera	Dispatches

Previous years
2025
Qilin Queen	Sunly	Rabbit's Foot
2024
Survie	Mosaique	Candala
2023
Rue Boissonade	Crack Of Light	Yorokobi
2022
Raclette	Lastotchka	Baiykara
2021
Babylone	Adhafera	Ricla

2020–2011
2020
Vaucelles	Oriental Mystique	Mozzarella
2019
Mehdaayih	Edisa	Merimbula
2017
Strathspey	Listen In	Elas Ruby
2016
Al Wathna	Impressionist	Do Re Mi Fa Sol
2015
Sea Calisi	Kataniya	Yaazy
2014
Dolniya	Savanne	Lavender Lane
2013
Pacific Rim	Chalnetta	Orion Love
2012
Yellow And Green	Mandistana	Nobilis
2011
Testosterone	Campanillas	Shankardeh

2010–2001
2010
Never Forget	Shamanova	Lady's Purse
2009
Ashalanda	Terre Du Vent	Kalla
2008
Treat Gently	Leo's Starlet	Dar Re Mi
2007
Legerete	Kaloura	Topka
2006
Time On	Lahudood	Litalia
2005
Royal Highness	Fraloga	Grand Opening
2004
Lune D'Or	Buoyant	Dream Play
2003
High Praise	Underwater	Sweet Folly
2002
Pearly Shells	Ana Marie	Bustling
2001
Diamilina	Volga	Shamdara

2000–1990
2000
America	Sadler's Flag	Polar Charge
1999
Sage Et Jolie	Side Saddle	White Star
1998
Another Dancer	Cantilever	Glorosia
1997
Silver Fun	Tenuous	Kassana
1996
Shamadara	Leonila	Spanish Falls
1995
Privity	Ultra Finesse	Genovefa
1994
Bonash	Ancara	Danseuse Du Nord
1993
Wemyss Bight	Diamonaka	Bright Mountain
1992
Trishyde	Trampoli	Afaladja
1991
Magic Night	La Monalisa	Crnagora
1990
Miss Alleged	Whitehaven	Ruby Tiger

The Prix de Malleret is a Group 2 flat horse race in France open to three-year-old thoroughbred fillies. It is run at Saint-Cloud over a distance of 2,400 metres (about 1½ miles), and it is scheduled to take place each year in late June.

== History ==
The event is named after Malleret, the location of a former stud farm in the Médoc region of France. The original version was a 1,600-metre race for three-year-olds of either gender.

A new version restricted to fillies was established in 1907. It was initially contested over 2,000 metres at Longchamp. It served as a consolation for fillies defeated in the Prix de Diane. It was abandoned throughout World War I, with no running from 1915 to 1918.

The Prix de Malleret was cancelled once during World War II, in 1940. It was staged at Maisons-Laffitte in 1943 and 1944.

The present system of race grading was introduced in 1971, and for a period the Prix de Malleret held Group 3 status. It was promoted to Group 2 level in 1977.

The Prix de Malleret was extended to 2,400 metres in 1987. It was transferred to Saint-Cloud in 2001. It is currently run on the same day as the Grand Prix de Saint-Cloud.

== Records ==
Leading jockey (7 wins):

- Charles Semblat – Edera (1923), Lucide (1925), Carissima (1926), Calandria (1929), Merveille (1930), Nantua (1931), Samos (1935)

Leading trainer (9 wins):

- André Fabre – Zoumorrod (1987), Wemyss Bight (1993), Bonash (1994), Sage et Jolie (1995), Diamilina (2001), Legerete (2007), Treat Gently (2008), Strathspey (2017), Waldlied (2018)

Leading owner (6 wins):

- Marcel Boussac – Lasarte (1920), Carissima (1926), Bellecour (1927), Argolide (1938), Damaka (1951), Licata (1972)

== Winners since 1979 ==
Year	Winner	Jockey	Trainer	Owner	Time
1979	Pitasia	Alfred Gibert	Aage Paus	Sir Douglas Clague	2:05.40
1980	Luth de Saron	Maurice Philipperon	John Cunnington Jr.	Paul de Moussac
1981	Leandra	Yves Saint-Martin	Pierre Pelat	Thierry van Zuylen	2:09.70
1982	Grease	Cash Asmussen	François Boutin	Josephine Abercrombie
1983	Chamisene	Gérard Dubroeucq	Mitri Saliba	Mahmoud Fustok
1984	Reine Mathilde	Freddy Head	Criquette Head	Ecurie Åland	2:05.70
1985	Kozana	Yves Saint-Martin	Alain de Royer-Dupré	HH Aga Khan IV
1986	Galunpe	Alfred Gibert	Bernard Sécly	J. M. Aubry-Dumand
1987	Zoumorrod	Cash Asmussen	André Fabre	Moufid Dabaghi
1988	Animatrice	Gary W. Moore	Criquette Head	Jacques Wertheimer	2:32.10
1989	Young Mother	Alain Badel	Jean-Marie Béguigné	Jean-Marie Béguigné	2:35.30
1990	Miss Alleged	Éric Legrix	Pascal Bary	Ecurie I. M. Fares	2:41.70
1991	Magic Night	Alain Badel	Philippe Demercastel	Mrs P. Demercastel	2:31.20
1992	Trishyde	Freddy Head	François Boutin	Stavros Niarchos	2:28.60
1993	Wemyss Bight	Thierry Jarnet	André Fabre	Khalid Abdullah	2:28.00
1994	Bonash	Thierry Jarnet	André Fabre	Khalid Abdullah	2:33.40
1995	Privity	Olivier Peslier	Pascal Bary	Khalid Abdullah	2:33.20
1996	Shamadara	Gérald Mossé	Alain de Royer-Dupré	HH Aga Khan IV	2:30.00
1997	Silver Fun	Olivier Doleuze	Criquette Head	Wertheimer et Frère	2:40.70
1998	Another Dancer	Cash Asmussen	Dominique Sépulchre	Julian Byng	2:28.80
1999	Sage et Jolie	Olivier Peslier	André Fabre	Jean-Luc Lagardère	2:31.50
2000	America	Olivier Doleuze	Criquette Head	Wertheimer et Frère	2:32.70
2001	Diamilina	Olivier Peslier	André Fabre	Jean-Luc Lagardère	2:33.30
2002	Pearly Shells	Christophe Soumillon	François Rohaut	6C Racing Ltd	2:29.00
2003	High Praise	Richard Hughes	John Gosden	Khalid Abdullah	2:30.40
2004	Lune d'Or	Thierry Jarnet	Richard Gibson	Mrs Paul de Moussac	2:42.60
2005	Royal Highness	Christophe Lemaire	Pascal Bary	Ecurie des Monceaux	2:35.30
2006	Time On	Olivier Peslier	John Dunlop	Robert Barnett	2:38.80
2007	Legerete	Olivier Peslier	André Fabre	Wertheimer et Frère	2:33.00
2008	Treat Gently	Stéphane Pasquier	André Fabre	Khalid Abdullah	2:31.10
2009	Ashalanda	Freddy di Fede	Alain de Royer-Dupré	HH Aga Khan IV	2:30.60
2010	Never Forget	Anthony Crastus	Élie Lellouche	Claude Cohen	2:34.60
2011	Testosterone	Stéphane Pasquier	Pascal Bary	Ecurie La Boetie	2:28.60
2012	Yellow and Green	Thierry Thulliez	Nicolas Clément	André de Ganay	2:32.00
2013	Pacific Rim	Umberto Rispoli	Mikel Delzangles	Wildenstein Stable	2:34.63
2014	Dolniya	Christophe Soumillon	Alain de Royer-Dupré	HH Aga Khan IV	2:34.80
2015	Sea Calisi	Mickael Barzalona	François Doumen	Martin S. Schwartz	2:28.91
2016	Al Wathna	Gregory Benoist	Jean-Claude Rouget	Al Shaqab Racing	2:39.38
2017	Strathspey	Mickael Barzalona	André Fabre	Godolphin	2:31.95
2018	Waldlied	Pierre-Charles Boudot	André Fabre	Newsells Park & Gestüt Ammerland	2:30.35
2019	Mehdaayih	Frankie Dettori	John Gosden	Emirates Park Pty Ltd	2:28.69
2020	Vaucelles (Note: The 2020 race was run at Longchamp in July due to the COVID-19 pandemic in France)	Christophe Soumillon	Pascal Bary	Gerard Augustin-Normand	2:29.27
2021	Babylone (Note: The 2021 race was run at Longchamp)	Mickael Barzalona	André Fabre	Haras Voltaire	2:32.87
2022	Raclette (Note: The 2022 race was run at Longchamp)	Olivier Peslier	André Fabre	Exors Of The Late Khalid Abdullah	2:31.40
2023	Rue Boissonade (Note: The 2023 race was run at Longchamp)	Gérald Mossé	Mikel Delzangles	Ecurie X	2:28.71
2024	Survie (Note: The 2024 race was run at Longchamp)	Stephane Pasquier	Nicolas Clement	Gerard Augustin-Normand	2:39.08
2025	Qilin Queen (Note: The 2025 race was run at Longchamp)	Kieran Shoemark	Ed Walker	TBT Racing	2:30.91
2026	Behrayna (Note: The 2026 race was run at Longchamp)	Mickael Barzalona	Francis-Henri Graffard	Aga Khan Studs SCEA	2:36.43

== Earlier winners ==
- 1907: Aux Armes
- 1908: Mafia II
- 1909: Messaouda
- 1910: Passe Rose
- 1911: Allamanda
- 1912: Wagram
- 1913: Ardeche
- 1914: Rivista
- 1915–18: no race
- 1919: Stearine
- 1920: Lasarte
- 1921: Ad Gloriam
- 1922: Honeysuckle
- 1923: Edera
- 1924: Creditable
- 1925: Lucide
- 1926: Carissima
- 1927: Bellecour
- 1928: Gratis
- 1929: Calandria
- 1930: Merveille
- 1931: Nantua
- 1932: Allumeuse
- 1933: Napee
- 1934: Emeraude
- 1935: Samos
- 1936: Love Call / Renommee *
- 1937: Barberybush
- 1938: Argolide
- 1939: Zoazo
- 1940: no race
- 1941: Nibelle
- 1942: Guirlande
- 1943: Blue-Berry
- 1944: La Belle du Canet
- 1945:
- 1946:
- 1947: Madelon
- 1948: Fair Dolly
- 1949: Camargue
- 1950: Neda
- 1951: Damaka
- 1952:
- 1953: Noory
- 1954: Bethora
- 1955: Picounda
- 1956: Fast Jane
- 1957: Denisy
- 1958: Torbella
- 1959: Mefair
- 1960: Sea Nymph
- 1961: White Heather
- 1962: Wakamba
- 1963: Irma la Douce
- 1964: Mirna
- 1965: Dark Wave
- 1966: Si Sage
- 1967: Ingrette
- 1968: Hardiesse
- 1969: Glaneuse
- 1970: Chatter Box
- 1971: Dixie
- 1972: Licata
- 1973: Virunga
- 1974: Azurella
- 1975: Infra Green
- 1976: Antrona
- 1977: Les Saintes Claires
- 1978: Calderina

* The 1936 race was a dead-heat and has joint winners.

== See also ==
- List of French flat horse races
