= Moonstone (horse) =

British-bred Thoroughbred racehorse

- Sire: Dalakhani
- Grandsire: Darshaan
- Dam: Solo de Lune
- Damsire: Law Society
- Sex: Mare
- Foaled: 3 March 2005
- Country: United Kingdom
- Colour: Bay
- Breeder: Britton House Stud Ltd
- Owner: Susan Magnier, Michael Tabor & Derrick Smith
- Trainer: Aidan O'Brien
- Record: 6: 1-2-0
- Earnings: £291,173

Major wins
- Irish Oaks (2008)

Moonstone (foaled 3 March 2005) is an Irish Thoroughbred racehorse and broodmare best known for her win in the Irish Oaks. Unraced as a two-year-old, her six-race track career lasted from April to October 2008. After finishing second in a maiden race on her debut she ran fourth in the Musidora Stakes and second in The Oaks before recording her first and only victory in the Irish Oaks. She finished unplaced in two subsequent races and was retired from racing at the end of the year. As a broodmare she has produced several good winners including US Army Ranger.

== Background ==
Moonstone is a bay mare with a white blaze bred in England by the Somerset-based Britton House Stud. As a foal in December 2006 she was put up for auction at Tattersalls and was bought for 700,000 guineas by Dermot "Demi" O'Byrne on behalf of John Magnier's Coolmore Stud organisation. The filly was sent into training with Aidan O'Brien at Ballydoyle. Like many Coolmore horses, the details of Moonstone's ownership differed from race to race: ahe sometimes raced in the colours of Magnier's wife Susan while on other occasions she was listed as being owned by a partnership of Susan Magnier, Michael Tabor and Derrick Smith.

Moonstone was from the first crop of foals sired by Dalakhani, the winner of the 2003 Prix de l'Arc de Triomphe. As a breeding stallion he also produced Conduit, Reliable Man, Duncan and Integral. Moonstone's dam Solo de Lune never raced but was a very successful broodmare whose other foals included L'Ancresse (second in the Irish Oaks and the Breeders' Cup Filly & Mare Turf) and Cerulean Sky (Prix Saint-Alary). Solo de Lune was a daughter of Truly Special (Prix de Royaumont) who was in turn a daughter of Arctique Royale. Other close relatives included Ardross, Electrocutionist and Scorpion.

== Racing career ==
=== 2008: three-year-old season ===
Moonstone was not raced as a two-year-old and began her racing career in a maiden race over ten furlongs at Leopardstown Racecourse on 20 April 2008. Starting the 3/1 joint favourite in a seventeen-runner field she made steady progress in the straight and finished second to the Dermot Weld-trained colt Winchester. Despite her defeat she reportedly displayed "immense potential" and was made ante-post favourite for The Oaks. The filly was then stepped up in class and sent to England for the Musidora Stakes (a trial race for the Oaks) at York Racecourse on 14 May. Racing on good-to-firm ground she tracked the leaders before being outpaced in the straight and finished fourth behind Lush Lashes, Cape Amber and Dar Re Mi.

Moonstone was a member of a six-horse Ballydoyle contingent for the 230th running of the Oaks at Epsom Racecourse on 6 June and with Johnny Murtagh, who had ridden her in her first two starts, opting to partner Adored, she had Richard Hughes in the saddle. She was made a 25/1 outsider but after being restrained at the rear of the field in the early stages she stayed on strongly in the straight to finish second to Look Here with the favoured Lush Lashes back in fifth. Murtagh was back in the saddle when Moonstone started 2/1 favourite for the Irish Oaks at the Curragh Racecourse on 13 July. The better fancied of her thirteen opponents included Katiyra (winner of the Derrinstown Stud 1,000 Guineas Trial and third in the Epsom Oaks), Gagnoa (Prix Penelope, second in the Prix de Diane), Mad About You (second in the Irish 1,000 Guineas) and Chinese White. After racing just behind the leaders before moving into second place behind Ice Queen, a 66/1 outsider also trained by Aidan O'Brien, inside the last quarter mile. Despite her odds, Ice Queen showed no signs of weakening and it was only in the final strides that Moonstone overhauled her stablemate to win by a short head. Gagnoa was two lengths back in third place ahead of Chinese White at Katiyra. She became the first maiden to win the race since Olwyn in 1977 and gave O'Brien his seventh consecutive Irish classic winner. Aiden O'Brien commented "It was a great race with two jockeys and two fillies giving it their all. It was a usual masterful ride from Johnny... Moonstone ran a smashing race at Epsom and she stays very well. She is progressing well".

After an absence of almost three months, Moonstone returned for two races at Longchamp Racecourse. In the Prix de l'Opéra over 2000 metres on 5 October she made no impact as she finished twelfth behind the German filly Lady Marian. Three weeks later she was moved up in distance and matched against male opponents in the 3100 metre Prix Royal-Oak and produced a rather better effort, coming home sixth of the eleven runners, four and a half lengths behind her stablemate Yeats.

== Breeding record ==
At the end of her racing career, Moonstone was retired to become a broodmare for the Coolmore Stud. She made an immediate impact, as her first four foals were all stakes winners:

- Nevis, a bay colt, foaled in 2010, sired by Dansili. Won two races including the Lingfield Derby Trial.
- Stubbs, bay colt, 2011, by Danehill Dancer. Won two races including the Rochestown Stakes.
- Words, bay filly, 2012, by Dansili. Won two races including the Munster Oaks.
- US Army Ranger, bay colt, 2013, by Galileo. Won two races including the Chester Vase, beaten favourite in the 2016 Epsom Derby
- Nelson, colt, 2015, by Frankel

== Pedigree ==
Pedigree of Moonstone (GB), bay mare, 2005
| Sire Dalakhani (IRE) 2000 | Darshaan (GB); 1981 | Shirley Heights | Mill Reef |
| Sire Dalakhani (IRE) 2000 | Darshaan (GB); 1981 | Shirley Heights | Hardiemma |
| Sire Dalakhani (IRE) 2000 | Darshaan (GB); 1981 | Delsy | Abdos |
| Sire Dalakhani (IRE) 2000 | Darshaan (GB); 1981 | Delsy | Kelty |
| Sire Dalakhani (IRE) 2000 | Daltawa (IRE); 1989 | Miswaki | Mr. Prospector |
| Sire Dalakhani (IRE) 2000 | Daltawa (IRE); 1989 | Miswaki | Hopespringseternal |
| Sire Dalakhani (IRE) 2000 | Daltawa (IRE); 1989 | Damana | Crystal Palace |
| Sire Dalakhani (IRE) 2000 | Daltawa (IRE); 1989 | Damana | Denia |
| Dam Solo de Lune (IRE) 1990 | Law Society (USA); 1982 | Alleged | Hoist The Flag |
| Dam Solo de Lune (IRE) 1990 | Law Society (USA); 1982 | Alleged | Princess Pout |
| Dam Solo de Lune (IRE) 1990 | Law Society (USA); 1982 | Bold Bikini | Boldnesian |
| Dam Solo de Lune (IRE) 1990 | Law Society (USA); 1982 | Bold Bikini | Ran-Tan |
| Dam Solo de Lune (IRE) 1990 | Truly Special (IRE); 1985 | Caerleon | Nijinsky |
| Dam Solo de Lune (IRE) 1990 | Truly Special (IRE); 1985 | Caerleon | Foreseer |
| Dam Solo de Lune (IRE) 1990 | Truly Special (IRE); 1985 | Arctique Royale | Royal and Regal |
| Dam Solo de Lune (IRE) 1990 | Truly Special (IRE); 1985 | Arctique Royale | Arctic Melody (Family: 23) |
