= Bay Bridge (horse) =

British racehorse

- Sire: New Bay
- Grandsire: Dubawi
- Dam: Hayyona
- Damsire: Multiplex
- Sex: Colt
- Foaled: 1 April 2018
- Country: United Kingdom
- Color: Bay
- Breeder: London Thoroughbred Services Ltd
- Owner: James Wigan & Ballylinch Stud
- Trainer: Michael Stoute
- Record: 10: 6-1-1
- Earnings: £1,107,359

Major wins
- James Seymour Stakes (2021); Brigadier Gerard Stakes (2022); Champion Stakes (2022); September Stakes (2023)

Bay Bridge (foaled 1 April 2018) is an Irish-bred, British-trained Thoroughbred racehorse.

== Background ==
Bay Bridge is a bay colt with no white markings bred in England by his owner, James Wigan's London Thoroughbred Services. He was sent into training with Michael Stoute at Freemason Lodge Stables in Newmarket, Suffolk.

He was from the first crop of foals sired by New Bay, who won the Prix du Jockey Club and finished third in the Prix de l'Arc de Triomphe as a three-year-old in 2012. Bay Bridge's dam Hayyona showed no racing ability, failing to win or place in three starts. She was a great-granddaughter of the Prix de Diane winner Shemaka, and closely related to many good winners including Technician, Shahrastani, Shakeel and Shakapour.

== Racing career ==
=== 2020: two-year-old season ===
Bay Bridge began his racing career in a seven furlong novice race (for horses with no more than two previous wins) on soft ground at Yarmouth Racecourse on 12 October when he started at odds of 10/1 and finished third to Marrakech Moon, beaten five and three quarter lengths by the winner. On his only other start of the year he finished fourth in a similar event on the synthetic polytrack surface at Kempton Park Racecourse in November.

=== 2021: three-year-old season ===
On 7 April Bay Bridge began his second season in a novice race over ten furlongs on Tapeta at Newcastle Racecourse when he was ridden by P. J. McDonald and started at odds 9/4. He took the lead a furlong out and accelerated away from his four opponents to win "comfortably" by five lengths. In May the colt started 11/4 favourite for the London Gold Cup, a handicap race over the same distance at Newbury Racecourse which saw him assigned a weight of 122 pounds. Ridden by Ryan Moore he raced towards the rear in the early stages before going to the front two furlongs from the finish and stayed on well to come home four lengths clear of the runner-up King Frankel. He was then aimed at the King Edward VII Stakes at Royal Ascot but was forced to miss the race owing to a foot abscess.

After a break of almost five months Bay Bridge returned for a ten furlong all-aged handicap at York Racecourse when he was ridden by Richard Kingscote and started favourite under top weight of 132 pounds. He was restrained towards the rear of the field by Kingscote before producing a strong late run which saw him gain the advantage in the closing stages and win by half a length from the six-year-old gelding Platinumcard. On 30 October the colt was stepped up in class to contest the Listed James Seymour Stakes at Newmarket Racecourse in which he was partnered by Moore and went off the 6/5 favourite in a five-runner field which included the dual Canadian International Stakes winner Desert Encounter. He raced in second place before moving up to join the front-running Majestic Dawn approaching the final furlong and got the better of a sustained struggle to win by half a length. Michael Stoute commented "Bay Bridge had a little niggle in the summer that kept him off, but his attitude was good there today. He's a professional horse with a good mind and I think he'll stay a mile and a half."

=== 2022: four-year-old season ===
Bay Bridge's third campaign began with a move up in class for the Group 3 Brigadier Gerard Stakes over ten furlongs at Sandown Park on 26 May. With Moore in the saddle he went off the 7/4 second favourite behind the Gordon Richards Stakes winner Mostahdaf in a five-runner field which also included Addeybb, Lord Glitters and Dubai Future. He settled towards the rear as Addeybb set the pace before making a forward move in the last quarter mile and taking the lead a furlong out. Bay Bridge drew right away in the closing stages and won in "impressive" style by five lengths. After the race James Wigan said "He's such a big, strong boy. We rather thought in the paddock that he looked as though he might need the race but we've always thought a lot of him and Sir Michael has always been very complimentary about him... I'd be inclined to stick to a mile and quarter at present. He's beaten some good horses in a good race today. Ryan said he showed a great turn of foot and it's very exciting." In the 5 June edition of the World's Best Racehorse Rankings Bay Bridge, despite never having contested a Group 1 race, was rated the fifth-best horse in the world behind Baaeed, Life Is Good, Nature Strip and Speaker's Corner.

== Pedigree ==
Pedigree of Bay Bridge (GB), bay colt, 2018
Sire New Bay (GB) 2012	Dubawi (IRE); 2002	Dubai Millennium (GB)	Seeking The Gold (USA)
Sire New Bay (GB) 2012	Dubawi (IRE); 2002	Dubai Millennium (GB)	Colorado Dancer (IRE)
Sire New Bay (GB) 2012	Dubawi (IRE); 2002	Zomaradah (GB)	Deploy
Sire New Bay (GB) 2012	Dubawi (IRE); 2002	Zomaradah (GB)	Jawaher (IRE)
Sire New Bay (GB) 2012	Cinnamon Bay (GB); 2004	Zamindar (USA)	Gone West
Sire New Bay (GB) 2012	Cinnamon Bay (GB); 2004	Zamindar (USA)	Zaizafon
Sire New Bay (GB) 2012	Cinnamon Bay (GB); 2004	Trellis Bay	Sadler's Wells (USA)
Sire New Bay (GB) 2012	Cinnamon Bay (GB); 2004	Trellis Bay	Bahamian (IRE)
Dam Hayyona (GB) 2010	Multiplex (GB); 2003	Danehill (USA)	Danzig
Dam Hayyona (GB) 2010	Multiplex (GB); 2003	Danehill (USA)	Razyana
Dam Hayyona (GB) 2010	Multiplex (GB); 2003	Shirley Valentine	Shirley Heights
Dam Hayyona (GB) 2010	Multiplex (GB); 2003	Shirley Valentine	Slightly Dangerous
Dam Hayyona (GB) 2010	Shemriyna (IRE); 2002	King of Kings	Sadler's Wells (USA)
Dam Hayyona (GB) 2010	Shemriyna (IRE); 2002	King of Kings	Zummerudd
Dam Hayyona (GB) 2010	Shemriyna (IRE); 2002	Shemaya	Darshaan (GB)
Dam Hayyona (GB) 2010	Shemriyna (IRE); 2002	Shemaya	Shemaka (Family: 3-o)

- Bay Bridge is inbred 4 × 4 to Sadler's Wells, meaning that this stallion appears twice in the fourth generation of his pedigree.
