= Festoon (disambiguation) =

A festoon is a wreath or garland hanging from two points.

Festoon may also refer to:

- Festoon (horse), a racehorse
- Festoon (moth)
- Festoon (bulb), an automotive light bulb type
