= Armiger (horse) =

British-bred Thoroughbred racehorse

- Sire: Rainbow Quest
- Grandsire: Blushing Groom
- Dam: Armeria
- Damsire: Northern Dancer
- Sex: Stallion
- Foaled: 15 February 1990
- Country: United Kingdom
- Colour: Chestnut
- Breeder: Juddmonte Farm
- Owner: Khalid Abdullah
- Trainer: Henry Cecil
- Record: 7: 3-2-0
- Earnings: £238,553

Major wins
- Racing Post Trophy (1992); Chester Vase (1993)

Awards
- Top-rated British two-year-old (1992)

Armiger (15 February 1990 – after 2002) was a British Thoroughbred racehorse and sire. As a two-year-old in 1992 he made an immediate impact, winning on his debut and then recording a six-length victory over a strong field in the Group One Racing Post Trophy. He was rated the best British juvenile of his generation. On his first appearance of 1993 he won the Chester Vase but lost his remaining four races but he did finish second in the Prix Lupin and the St Leger. At the end of his racing career he was retired to become a breeding stallion in Japan but had limited success as a sire of winners.

== Background ==
Armiger was a chestnut horse with a broad white blaze and three long white socks bred in England by his owner Khalid Abdullah's Juddmonte Farms. He was sired by Rainbow Quest who won the Prix de l'Arc de Triomphe before becoming a very successful breeding stallion. Rainbow Quest's other progeny included Quest for Fame, Saumarez, Raintrap, Nedawi Spectrum and Millenary. Armiger won one minor race at Windsor Racecourse from six starts as a three-year-old in 1988. She was a granddaughter of Treasure Chest, a Florida-bred broodmare whose other descendants have included Glint of Gold, Diamond Shoal and Ensconse (Irish 1,000 Guineas).

The colt was sent into training with Henry Cecil at his Warren Place stable in Newmarket, Suffolk. Armiger was ridden in all but one of his races by Pat Eddery.

== Racing career ==
=== 1992: two-year-old season ===
Armiger made his racecourse debut in a seventeen-runner maiden race over one mile at Newmarket Racecourse on 30 September. Starting the 7/2 second favourite tracked the leaders before taking the lead three furlongs from the finish and drew away in the closing stages to win by three and a half lengths from the Peter Chapple-Hyam-trained favourite Zind. On 24 October the colt was moved up sharply in class for the Group One Racing Post Trophy at Doncaster Racecourse and was made the 5/4 favourite ahead of the fillies Ivanka and Marillette (May Hill Stakes) and the Royal Lodge Stakes winner Desert Secret. Armiger tracked the leaders and turned into the straight in fourth place behind the outsiders Noyan, Newton's Law and Wahem. He took the lead 2 1/2 furlongs from the finish and accelerated clear of his nine opponents to win by six lengths from Ivanka, with Zind another four lengths back in third. Brough Scott writing in The Independent called Armiger's performance as a "mighty" one and compared the colt's racing style to that of Mill Reef. The Racing Post's John Randall rated his performance the fifth best in the history of the race, behind those of Celtic Swing, Reference Point, Apalachee and Vaguely Noble.

In the International Classification of European two-year-olds for 1992 Armiger was the top-rated British-trained colt, one pound behind the French-trained Zafonic.

=== 1993: three-year-old season ===
Armiger began his second season in the Chester Vase (a trial race for The Derby) over 1 1/2 miles on 4 May. Starting the 4/6 favourite against five opponents he maintained his unbeaten record, taking the lead in the final furlong and winning by 2 1/2 lengths from the Irish-trained Shrewd Idea. As his connections were also responsible for the Derby favourite Tenby, it seemed probable that Armiger would contest the Prix du Jockey Club. After the race Cecil said that he was satisfied with the performance commenting "Like a lot of good horses he is lazy at home and he'll come on for the race... He has got very good speed and a lot of guts". Twelve days after his win at Chester, Armiger was sent to France for the Prix Lupin over 2100 metres at Longchamp Racecourse and started 1/2 favourite in a five-runner field which included Hernando and Dernier Empereur. After leading from the start he was challenged by Hernando in the straight, overtaken 200 metres from the finish and beaten a neck into second place. Cecil felt that the colt had failed to cope with the firmer ground but there were also fears that a previous back injury had hampered his progress.

After a break of three months Armiger returned in the Group Two Great Voltigeur Stakes at York Racecourse on 17 August. He was made the odds-on favourite but never looked likely to win and was eased down by Eddery in the closing stages to finish seventh of the nine runners behind Bob's Return. On 11 September Armiger started 4/1 second favourite behind Bob's Return in a nine-runner field for the St Leger Stakes over 14 1/2 furlongs at Doncaster. After leading from the start he was overtaken by Bob's Return three furlongs from the finish but stayed on to hold second place, 3 1/2 lengths behind the winner and a length and a half in front of his stable companion Edbaysaan. Armiger ended his racing career on 3 October in the Prix de l'Arc de Triomphe. Ridden by Willie Carson, as Eddery opted to ride Khalid Abdullah's Irish Oaks winner Wemyss Bight, he finished fifteenth of the twenty-three runners, 13 1/2 lengths behind the winner Urban Sea.

== Stud record ==
At the end of his racing career, Armiger was exported to Japan to stand as breeding stallion. He remained at stud until 2002 but appears to have had increasing fertility problems and sired only four foals in his last three seasons. He sired a total of 130 winners, with the best of his offspring probably being the mare Stephanie Chan who was placed twice in Graded stakes races.

== Pedigree ==
Pedigree of Armiger (GB), chestnut stallion, 1990
Sire Rainbow Quest (USA) 1981	Blushing Groom (FR); 1974	Red God	Nasrullah
Sire Rainbow Quest (USA) 1981	Blushing Groom (FR); 1974	Red God	Spring Run
Sire Rainbow Quest (USA) 1981	Blushing Groom (FR); 1974	Runaway Bride	Wild Risk
Sire Rainbow Quest (USA) 1981	Blushing Groom (FR); 1974	Runaway Bride	Aimee
Sire Rainbow Quest (USA) 1981	I Will Follow (USA); 1975	Herbager	Vandale
Sire Rainbow Quest (USA) 1981	I Will Follow (USA); 1975	Herbager	Flagette
Sire Rainbow Quest (USA) 1981	I Will Follow (USA); 1975	Where You Lead	Raise a Native
Sire Rainbow Quest (USA) 1981	I Will Follow (USA); 1975	Where You Lead	Noblesse
Dam Armeria (USA) 1985	Northern Dancer (CAN); 1961	Nearctic	Nearco
Dam Armeria (USA) 1985	Northern Dancer (CAN); 1961	Nearctic	Lady Angels
Dam Armeria (USA) 1985	Northern Dancer (CAN); 1961	Natalma	Native Dancer
Dam Armeria (USA) 1985	Northern Dancer (CAN); 1961	Natalma	Almahmoud
Dam Armeria (USA) 1985	Frontonian (USA); 1974	Buckpasser	Tom Fool
Dam Armeria (USA) 1985	Frontonian (USA); 1974	Buckpasser	Busanda
Dam Armeria (USA) 1985	Frontonian (USA); 1974	Treasure Chest	Rough 'n Tumble
Dam Armeria (USA) 1985	Frontonian (USA); 1974	Treasure Chest	Iltis (Family: 21-a)
