= Critérium International (horse race) =

Flat horse race in France

- Class: Group 1
- Location: Saint-Cloud Racecourse; Saint-Cloud, France
- Inaugurated: 2001
- Race type: Flat / Thoroughbred
- Website: france-galop.com

Race information
- Distance: 1,600 metres (1 mile)
- Surface: Turf
- Track: Left-handed
- Qualification: Two-year-olds excluding geldings
- Weight: 57 kg Allowances; 1½ kg for fillies
- Purse: €250,000 (2021); 1st: €142,850

Critérium International
2025
Puerto Rico	Campacite	Cape Orator

Previous years
2024
Twain	Mount Kilimanjaro	Apples And Bananas
2023
Sunway	Alcantor	Portland
2022
Proud And Regal	Espionage	Salt Bay
2021
Angel Bleu	Ancient Rome	Purplepay

2020–2011
2020
Van Gogh	Normandy Bridge	Jadoomi
2019
Alson	Armory	Only two ran
2018
Royal Meeting	Hermosa	Graignes
2016
Thunder Snow	South Seas	Promise To Be True
2015
Johannes Vermeer	Stormy Antarctic	Attendu
2014
Vert De Grece	Johnny Barnes	Sherlock
2013
Ectot	Earnshaw	Prestige Vendome
2012
Loch Garman	Anna's Pearl	Us Law
2011
French Fifteen	Pakal	Bonfire

2010–2001
2010
Roderic O'Connor	Salto	Maiguri
2009
Jan Vermeer	Emerald Commander	Rosanara
2008
Zafisio	Prince Siegfried	Silver Frost
2007
Thewayyouare	Hello Morning	Redolent
2006
Mount Nelson	Spirit One	Yellowstone
2005
Carlotamix	Stormy River	Porto Santo
2004
Helios Quercus	Dubai Surprise	Walk In The Park
2003
Bago	Top Seed	Acropolis
2002
Dalakhani	Chevalier	Governor Brown
2001
Act One	Landseer	Guys And Dolls

The Critérium International is a Group 1 flat horse race in France open to two-year-old thoroughbred colts and fillies. It is run at Saint-Cloud over a distance of 1,600 metres (1 mile), and it is scheduled to take place each year in late October or early November.

== History ==
The event was established at Saint-Cloud in 2001, when it was introduced as part of a restructured program for juveniles in France and replaced the Prix de la Salamandre which was discontinued in 2000. It was given the same title as a race held annually at Longchamp from 1893 to 1910. The modern race was originally run over 1,600 furlongs but was reduced to 1,400 metres in 2015 as part of a series of changes to autumn races for two-year-olds. In 2018 the race was transferred from Saint-Cloud to Longchamp. The distance returned to 1,600 metres in 2020 as part of a two-year trial. The race returned to Saint-Cloud in 2020 and continues to be run there as of 2025.

The current version of the Critérium International often features horses which ran previously in the Prix des Chênes or the Prix Thomas Bryon.

== Records ==
Leading jockey (5 wins):

- Christophe Soumillon – Dalakhani (2002), Carlotamix (2005), Thunder Snow (2016), Royal Meeting (2018), Puerto Rico (2025)

Leading trainer (7 wins):

- Aidan O'Brien – Mount Nelson (2006), Jan Vermeer (2009), Roderic O'Connor (2010), Johannes Vermeer (2015), Van Gogh (2020), Twain (2024), Puerto Rico (2025)

Leading owner (7 wins): (includes part ownership)

- Sue Magnier / Derrick Smith / Michael Tabor – Mount Nelson (2006), Jan Vermeer (2009), Roderic O'Connor (2010), Johannes Vermeer (2015), Van Gogh (2020), Twain (2024), Puerto Rico (2025)

== Winners ==
Year	Winner	Jockey	Trainer	Owner	Time
2001	Act One	Thierry Gillet	Jonathan Pease	Gerald Leigh	1:47.10
2002	Dalakhani	Christophe Soumillon	Alain de Royer-Dupré	HH Aga Khan IV	1:52.00
2003	Bago	Thierry Gillet	Jonathan Pease	Niarchos Family	1:47.00
2004	Helios Quercus	Alexandre Roussel	Cyriaque Diard	Thierry Maudet	1:45.30
2005	Carlotamix	Christophe Soumillon	André Fabre	HH Aga Khan IV	1:45.40
2006	Mount Nelson	Seamie Heffernan	Aidan O'Brien	Smith / Tabor / Magnier	1:41.30
2007	Thewayyouare	Stéphane Pasquier	André Fabre	Sean Mulryan	1:45.30
2008	Zafisio	Dominique Boeuf	Paul Blockley	Hugh Downs	1:46.10
2009	Jan Vermeer	Colm O'Donoghue	Aidan O'Brien	Tabor / Smith / Magnier	1:45.60
2010	Roderic O'Connor	Johnny Murtagh	Aidan O'Brien	Magnier / Tabor et al.	1:45.70
2011	French Fifteen	Thierry Thulliez	Nicolas Clément	Raymond Tooth	1:43.50
2012	Loch Garman	Kevin Manning	Jim Bolger	Mrs J. S. Bolger	1:52.70
2013	Ectot	Grégory Benoist	Élie Lellouche	G Augustin-Normand & E Vidal	1:43.11
2014	Vert De Grece	Umberto Rispoli	Roger Varian	Britannia Thoroughbreds 1	1:43.16
2015	Johannes Vermeer	Ryan Moore	Aidan O'Brien	Tabor / Smith / Magnier / Ah Khing	1:30.15
2016	Thunder Snow	Christophe Soumillon	Saeed bin Suroor	Godolphin	1:28.20
2017	no race (Note: The 2017 running was abandoned due to protests at Saint-Cloud.)
2018	Royal Meeting (Note: The 2018 running took place at Chantilly to allow track maintenance to take place at Longchamp)	Christophe Soumillon	Saeed bin Suroor	Godolphin	1:27.19
2019	Alson	Frankie Dettori	Jean-Pierre Carvalho	Gestüt Schlenderhan	1:28.61
2020	Van Gogh	Pierre-Charles Boudot	Aidan O'Brien	Tabor / Smith / Magnier / Ah Khing	1:48.31
2021	Angel Bleu	Frankie Dettori	Ralph Beckett	Marc Chan	1:44.40
2022	Proud And Regal	Gavin Ryan	Donnacha O'Brien	Smith / Tabor / Magnier	1:51:34
2023	Sunway	Oisin Murphy	David Menuisier	Pariente, Lines, Qatar	1:46.32
2024	Twain	Ryan Moore	Aidan O'Brien	Tabor / Smith / Magnier	1:46.31
2025	Puerto Rico	Christophe Soumillon	Aidan O'Brien	Magnier / Tabor / Smith	1:41.85
2026	Master Man	Anthony Crastus	Richard Chotard	Serge Tardy, Ecurie Melanie et al	1:41.76

== Longchamp 1893–1910 ==
The original Critérium International at Longchamp was also for two-year-olds. It was contested on a straight track over 1,100 metres. It was held on the first or second Saturday in October. The prize money was 25,000 francs (equivalent to €78,500).

- 1893: Bayadere
- 1894: Fragola
- 1895: Hero
- 1896: Atys
- 1897: Cazabat
- 1898: Perth
- 1899: Semendria
- 1900: Pierre Infernale
- 1901: Derbouka
- 1902: Mireille
- 1903: Gouvernant
- 1904: Jardy
- 1905: Blue Fly
- 1906: Calomel
- 1907: Halima
- 1908: Azalee
- 1909: Marsa
- 1910: Blina

== See also ==
- List of French flat horse races
