= Prix de Condé =

Flat horse race in France

- Class: Group 3
- Location: Longchamp Racecourse; Paris, France
- Inaugurated: 1867
- Race type: Flat / Thoroughbred
- Website: france-galop.com

Race information
- Distance: 1,800 m (1m 1f)
- Surface: Turf
- Track: Right-handed
- Qualification: Two-year-olds excluding Group 2 winners
- Weight: 56 1/2 kg Allowances; 1 1/2 kg for fillies Penalties; 2 1/2 kg if two Group 3 wins 1 1/2 kg if one Group 3 win
- Purse: €80,000 (2021); 1st: €40,000

Prix de Condé
2023
Shiffrin	De Sica	Gold Index

Previous years
2022
Victoria Road	Rashford	Nasomo
2021
El Bodegon	True Testament	Vadeni

2020-2011
2020
Makaloun	Anasia	Kergrist
2019
Hopeful	Al Dabaran	The Summit
2018
Line of Duty	Syrtis	Wonderment
2017
Luminate	Kingstar	King Of Camelot
2016
Frankuus	Prinz Hlodowig	Waldgeist
2015
Robin Of Navan	Millfield	Cloth Of Stars
2014
Epicuris	Big Blue	Capo Maximo
2013
Elliptique	Diaghan	Skyrockets
2012
Morandi	Onedargent	Lion D'Anvers
2011
Loi	Silverball	Lidari

2010-2001
2010
Prairie Star	Bubble Chic	Kreem
2009
Zeitoper	Circumvent	Shamalgan
2008
Naval Officer	King Of Sydney	Becomes You
2007
High Rock	Hannouma	Sanjida
2006
Midnight Beauty	Massive	Ailton
2005
Linda's Lad	Best Name	Fauvelia
2004
Musketier	Doctor Dino	Wingman
2003
Latice	Voix Du Nord	Prospect Park
2002
Graikos	Garlinote	Silver Gilt
2001
Rashbag	Caesarion	Tau Ceti

2000-1990
2000
Panis	Dayglow Dancer	Sligo Bay
1999
Lord Flasheart	Crystal D'Ass	Petroselli
1998
Bienamado	Persianlux	Franky Furbo
1997
Thief Of Hearts	Special Quest	Daymarti
1996
New Frontier	Monza	Kaldou Star
1995
Go Between	Battle Dore	Esquive
1994
Poliglote	Marie De Ken	Oh So Fast
1993
Celtic Arms	Three Angels	Sunshack
1992
Shemaka	Marchand De Sable	Ranger
1991
Cristofori	Sharp Counsel	Break Bread
1990
Pistolet Bleu	Balleroy	Fortune's Wheel

The Prix de Condé is a Group 3 flat horse race in France open to two-year-old thoroughbreds. It is run at Chantilly over a distance of 1,800 metres (1 mile 1 furlong), and it is scheduled to take place each year in October.

== History ==
The event was established in 1867, and it was initially held at Chantilly. It was named after the Princes of Condé, the former owners of the Château de Chantilly. It was originally contested over 2,000 metres.

The race was transferred to Longchamp in 1907. It was abandoned throughout World War I, but there was a substitute version at Chantilly in 1917.

The Prix de Condé was cancelled once during World War II, in 1939. It was run at Auteuil in 1940 and Maisons-Laffitte in 1943, both with a distance of 1,800 metres. It was staged at Le Tremblay in 1944.

The present system of race grading was introduced in 1971, and the Prix de Condé was classed at Group 3 level. It was cut to 1,800 metres in 1985.

The race was transferred back to Chantilly in 2015.

== Records ==
Leading jockey (6 wins):

- Roger Poincelet – Telegram (1949), Simplon (1952), Altipan (1956), Gelsemium (1958), Tchita (1960), Le Mesnil (1962)

Leading trainer (7 wins):

- André Fabre – Dancehall (1988), Cristofori (1991), New Frontier (1996), Thief of Hearts (1997), Graikos (2002), Linda's Lad (2005), Elliptique (2013)

Leading owner (4 wins):

- Édouard de Rothschild – Saint Just (1909), Chateau Lafite (1917), Bubbles (1927), Amalia (1935)

== Winners since 1980 ==
Year	Winner	Jockey	Trainer	Owner	Time
1980	The Wonder	Yves Saint-Martin	Jacques de Chevigny	Mrs Alain du Breil	2:16.90
1981	Beau Pretender	Freddy Head	Raymond Touflan	Jean-Pierre Lehmann	2:20.30
1982	Nile Hawk	Yves Saint-Martin	Maurice Zilber	Garo Vanian
1983	Long Mick	Cash Asmussen	François Boutin	Jean-Luc Lagardère	2:10.70
1984	Idealiste	Freddy Head	Criquette Head	Jacques Wertheimer	2:22.50
1985	Minatzin	Steve Cauthen	Guy Bonnaventure	Norman Ross	2:01.10
1986	Groom Dancer	Dominique Boeuf	Tony Clout	Marvin Warner	1:55.40
1987	Triteamtri	Dominique Boeuf	Tony Clout	Marvin Warner	2:01.80
1988	Dancehall	Cash Asmussen	André Fabre	Bruce McNall	1:59.60
1989	Dr Somerville	Gary W. Moore	Criquette Head	Maktoum Al Maktoum	1:52.00
1990	Pistolet Bleu	Dominique Boeuf	Élie Lellouche	Daniel Wildenstein	1:52.20
1991	Cristofori	Steve Cauthen	André Fabre	Sheikh Mohammed	1:55.50
1992	Shemaka	William Mongil	Alain de Royer-Dupré	HH Aga Khan IV	1:56.20
1993	Celtic Arms	Dominique Boeuf	Pascal Bary	Jean-Louis Bouchard	2:01.50
1994	Poliglote	Freddy Head	Criquette Head	Jacques Wertheimer	1:55.00
1995	Go Between	Eric Saint-Martin	Antonio Spanu	Naji Pharaon	2:02.50
1996	New Frontier (Note: Monza finished first in 1996, but he was relegated to second place following a stewards' inquiry)	Thierry Jarnet	André Fabre	Michael Tabor	2:01.30
1997	Thief of Hearts	Olivier Peslier	André Fabre	Sheikh Mohammed	1:50.50
1998	Bienamado	Richard Hughes	Peter Chapple-Hyam	John Toffan / McCaffery	1:59.10
1999	Lord Flasheart	Gérald Mossé	Alain de Royer-Dupré	Jean-Claude Seroul	2:04.10
2000	Panis	Thierry Thulliez	Pascal Bary	Ecurie J. L. Bouchard	1:53.90
2001	Rashbag	Dominique Boeuf	Jean-Claude Rouget	Daniel-Yves Trèves	2:03.70
2002	Graikos	Olivier Plaçais	André Fabre	Sheikh Mohammed	1:58.40
2003	Latice	Christophe Lemaire	Jean-Marie Béguigné	Enrico Ciampi	1:51.40
2004	Musketier	Christophe Lemaire	Pascal Bary	Ecurie J. L. Bouchard	1:59.60
2005	Linda's Lad	Christophe Soumillon	André Fabre	Sean Mulryan	1:54.20
2006	Midnight Beauty	Christophe Lemaire	M. Delcher Sánchez	Jorge Postigo Silva	1:54.20
2007	High Rock	Christophe Lemaire	Jean-Claude Rouget	Robert Bousquet	1:51.60
2008	Naval Officer	Ioritz Mendizabal	Jean-Claude Rouget	Joseph Allen	1:53.50
2009	Zeitoper	Ahmed Ajtebi	Saeed bin Suroor	Godolphin	1:57.90
2010	Prairie Star	Anthony Crastus	Élie Lellouche	Ecurie Wildenstein	1:59.50
2011	Loi	Olivier Peslier	Jean-Marie Béguigné	Ciampi / Disaro	1:54.63
2012	Morandi	Grégory Benoist	Jean-Claude Rouget	Daniel-Yves Trèves	2:04.60
2013	Elliptique	Maxime Guyon	André Fabre	Rothschild family	1:58.01
2014	Epicuris	Thierry Thulliez	Criquette Head-Maarek	Khalid Abdullah	1:56.89
2015	Robin Of Navan	Tony Piccone	Harry Dunlop	Cross, Deal, Foden, Sieff	1:52.14
2016	Frankuus	Ioritz Mendizabal	Mark Johnston	Lootah / Al Shaikh	1:51.62
2017	Luminate	Aurelien Lemaitre	Freddy Head	Highclere Thoroughbred Racing	1:51.16
2018	Line of Duty	William Buick	Charlie Appleby	Godolphin	1:50.51
2019	Hopeful	Maxime Guyon	Carlos Laffon-Parias	Wertheimer et Frère	1:56.94
2020	Makaloun	Cristian Demuro	Jean-Claude Rouget	HH Aga Khan IV	1:56.53
2021	El Bodegon	Ioritz Mendizabal	James Ferguson	Nas Syndicate & A F O'Callaghan	1:52.69
2022	Victoria Road	Ryan Moore	Aidan O'Brien	Westerberg / Smith / Magnier / Tabor	1:49.11
2023	Shiffrin	Simon Planque	Nicolas Le Roch	Haras D'Etreham	1:54.80
2024	Lazy Griff	Christophe Soumillon	Charlie Johnston	Middleham Park Racing & G Griffiths	1:51.20

== Earlier winners ==
- 1867: Lady Henriette
- 1868: Massinissa
- 1869: Bachelette
- 1870: no race
- 1871: Revigny
- 1872:
- 1873: Saltarelle
- 1874: Almanza
- 1875: Basquine
- 1876: Jongleur
- 1877: Solliciteuse
- 1878: Sheridan
- 1879: La Flandrie
- 1880: La Bultee
- 1881: Seigneur
- 1882: Farfadet
- 1883: Escogriffe
- 1884: Valentin
- 1885: Utrecht
- 1886: Oviedo
- 1887: Saint Gall
- 1888: Prophete
- 1889: Bougie
- 1890: Primerose
- 1891: Fair Head
- 1892: Argenteuil
- 1893: Le Pompon
- 1894: Le Justicier
- 1895:
- 1896: Ortie Blanche
- 1897: Volnay
- 1898: Sospiro
- 1899: Codoman
- 1900: Jacobite
- 1901: Kruger
- 1902: Etang d'Or
- 1903: Feuille de Chou
- 1904: Genial
- 1905: Monsieur Perichon
- 1906: Claudia
- 1907: Talo Biribil
- 1908: Aveu
- 1909: Saint Just
- 1910: Made in England
- 1911: Mongolie
- 1912: Pirpiriol
- 1913: Oreste
- 1914–16: no race
- 1917: Chateau Lafite
- 1918: no race
- 1919: Campa
- 1920: Harpocrate
- 1921: Ramus
- 1922: Massine
- 1923: Roquentin
- 1924: Sherry
- 1925: Becassine
- 1926: Accalmie
- 1927: Bubbles
- 1928: Dictateur X
- 1929: Beldurhissa
- 1930: Barneveldt
- 1931: Gris Perle
- 1932: Minestrone
- 1933: Denver
- 1934: Finlandaise
- 1935: Amalia
- 1936: Galloway
- 1937: Castel Fusano
- 1938: Galerien
- 1939: no race
- 1940: Le Marmot
- 1941: Massinor
- 1942: Verso II
- 1943: Laborde
- 1944: Basileus
- 1945: Prince Chevalier
- 1946: Rose O'Lynn
- 1947:
- 1948: Tagala
- 1949: Telegram
- 1950: Le Tyrol
- 1951: Le Bourgeois
- 1952: Simplon
- 1953: Friendship
- 1954: Walhalla
- 1955: Lagides
- 1956: Altipan
- 1957: Apple Pippin
- 1958: Gelsemium
- 1959: Wordpam
- 1960: Tchita
- 1961: Montfleur
- 1962: Le Mesnil
- 1963: Le Fabuleux
- 1964: Jacambre
- 1965: A Tempo
- 1966: Phaeton
- 1967: La Lagune
- 1968: Longpont
- 1969: Faldor
- 1970: Skelda
- 1971: Relpin
- 1972: Margouillat
- 1973: Riverton
- 1974: Blocus
- 1975: French Friend
- 1976: El Criollo
- 1977: Pevero
- 1978: Top Ville
- 1979: Corvaro

== See also ==
- List of French flat horse races
