= Reliable Man =

British-bred Thoroughbred racehorse (2008–2026)

- Sire: Dalakhani
- Grandsire: Darshaan
- Dam: On Fair Stage
- Damsire: Sadler's Wells
- Sex: Stallion
- Foaled: 27 March 2008
- Died: 19 February 2026 (aged 17)
- Country: United Kingdom
- Colour: Grey
- Breeder: N P Bloodstock Ltd
- Owner: Pride Racing Club; Salinity Racing Stables; Fair Salinia Ltd, R A & J E Ferguson Partnership et al
- Trainer: Alain de Royer-Dupré; Chris Waller
- Record: 14: 5-1-2
- Earnings: £1,216,758

Major wins
- Prix du Jockey Club (2011); Prix Niel (2011); Queen Elizabeth Stakes (2013)

Reliable Man (27 March 2008 – 19 February 2026) was a British-bred Thoroughbred racehorse and sire. Initially trained in France, he won two minor races in the spring of 2011 before defeating a strong field to win the Prix du Jockey Club. After losing his unbeaten record in the Grand Prix de Paris he won the Prix Niel before running poorly in the Prix de l'Arc de Triomphe. As a four-year-old he failed to win in six races but ran well to finish a close fourth in the King George VI and Queen Elizabeth Stakes. In 2013 he was sent to Australia where he won the Queen Elizabeth Stakes (ATC), sustaining a career-ending injury in the process.

== Background ==
Reliable Man was a grey horse bred in the United Kingdom by Sven Hanson's N P Bloodstock. His sire, Dalakhani, from whom he inherited his grey colour, was an outstanding racehorse who won eight of his nine races including the Critérium International, Prix Lupin, Prix du Jockey Club and the 2003 Prix de l'Arc de Triomphe At stud, Dalakhani's other offspring have included Conduit Duncan (Irish St Leger) Moonstone (Irish Oaks) Chinese White (Pretty Polly Stakes) and Integral.

Reliable Man's dam On Fair Stage was a daughter of Hanson's Epsom Oaks winner Fair Salinia. As a descendant of the broodmare Judy O'Grady, Fair Salinia came from the same branch of Thoroughbred family 16-c which also produced Green Dancer, Solemia, Authorized, Dream Well and Makfi. On Fair Stage also produced the successful National Hunt performer French Opera whose wins included the Game Spirit Chase and the Celebration Chase.

Hanson owned the horse in a variety of partnerships throughout his racing career. Reliable Man was initially sent into training in France with Alain de Royer-Dupré.

Reliable Man was euthanised on 19 February 2026, at the age of 17, following complications from an unspecified operation.

== Racing career ==
=== 2011: three-year-old season ===
Reliable Man did not race as a two-year-old, beginning his racing career in a maiden race over 2000 metres at Saint-Cloud Racecourse on 12 April 2011 in which he was ridden, as in all his races that season, by Gerald Mosse. Starting at odds of 7.3/1, he raced just behind the leaders before taking the lead 400 metres from the finish. He accelerated clear of his fourteen opponents and won by three lengths despite being eased down by Mosse in the final strides. Four weeks later, the colt started 7/10 favourite in a field of five for the Prix du Mont Pagnotte over the same distance at Chantilly Racecourse. Mosse restrained the colt at the back of the field before moving forward in the straight, taking the lead in the last 100 metres and winning by three quarters of a length from Veter.

On 5 June, Reliable Man was moved up sharply in class for 174th running of the Prix du Jockey Club over 2100 metres at Chantilly and started a 16/1 outsider. His fifteen opponents were headed by the Aga Khan's Baraan, winner of the Prix La Force and the Irish 2000 Guineas winner Roderic O'Connor who started the 9/2 joint favourites. The other contenders included Tin Horse (winner of Poule d'Essai des Poulains), Crackerjack King (Derby Italiano), Casamento (Racing Post Trophy), Prairie Star (Prix Hocquart), Grand Vent (Prix Noailles) and Bubble Chic (runner-up to The Derby winner Pour Moi in the Prix Greffulhe). Reliable Man raced towards the rear of the field before making progress in the straight and switching to the outside to make his challenge 300 metres out. He overtook the leader Bubble Chic 100 metres out and won by three-quarters of length, with a gap of two lengths back to Baraan who took third place just ahead of Colombian and Tin Horse. After the race Alain de Royer-Dupré said "He's a horse of great quality. We decided on coming here after he won his first race at Saint-Cloud. He's got a lot of class, but it's all still very new to him".

In the Grand Prix de Paris over 2400 metres at Longchamp Racecourse on 14 July Reliable Man started 2/1 favourite. He was again opposed by Bubble Chic, but his main danger appeared to come from the Aidan O'Brien-trained Treasure Beach who had been narrowly beaten by Pour Moi in the Epsom Derby before winning the Irish Derby from his stablemate Seville (also in the Longchamp field). After racing in fourth place, the favourite made steady progress in the straight but never looked likely to win and finished third behind the André Fabre-trained Meandre. After a two-month break, Reliable Man faced a rematch with Meandre in the Prix Niel at Longchamp in September. In a slowly-run race (the time was 5.8 seconds slower than that for the Grand Prix) Reliable Man settled in third behind the leaders King of Armor and Colombian before moving up on the outside to take the lead 300 metres from the finish. He went clear of the field before being eased down by Mosse to win by two lengths from Meandre, who finished strongly but never looked likely to threaten the winner. Explaining the colt's improvement from his previous run, Royer-Dupre said "The ground was too firm for him in the Grand Prix de Paris and he didn't come down the hill well. He came with a good run here and has the action of a top horse". In October, Reliable Man started the 12/1 sixth choice in the betting for France's most prestigious race, the Prix de l'Arc de Triomphe but ran very poorly, finishing fifteenth of the sixteen runners behind Danedream.

=== 2012: four-year-old season ===
As a four-year-old, Reliable Man failed to win in six races. In the spring he finished third behind Cirrus des Aigles in the Prix Ganay and fourth behind Golden Lilac in the Prix d'Ispahan. He was then sent overseas for the first time to contest the Prince of Wales's Stakes over ten furlongs at Royal Ascot and finished fourth behind So You Think, Carlton House and Farhh. Maxime Guyon took over the ride from Mosse when the colt returned to Ascot for the King George VI and Queen Elizabeth Stakes a month later. He started a 20/1 outsider but produced his best performance of the season to finish fourth behind Danedream, Nathaniel and St Nicholas Abbey, beaten less than two lengths by the winner and finishing ahead of Dunaden, Sea Moon and Masked Marvel. In September, Reliable Man was dropped in class and started odds-on favourite for the Group Three Coupe de Maisons-Laffitte but was beaten one and a half lengths by the Jonathan Pease-trained Maxios. On his final appearance of the season, the colt was sent to Canada to contest the Canadian International Stakes at Woodbine Racetrack in which he finished eighth of the ten runners behind Joshua Tree.

=== 2013: five-year-old season ===
For the following season, Reliable Man was sent to race in Australia where he was trained by Chris Waller. The horse made his Australian debut on 6 April in the George Ryder Stakes over 1500 metres (500 metres less than any race he had contested in Europe) at Rosehill Gardens Racecourse in which he was ridden by Corey Brown. Starting a 50/1 outsider, he finished sixth of the twelve runners, beaten less than two lengths by the winner Pierro. Three weeks later, Reliable Man was ridden by Hugh Bowman when he contested the Queen Elizabeth Stakes over 2000 metres at Randwick Racecourse. He started at odds of 11/1 behind the odds-on favourite Dundeel (to whom he was conceding eight pounds) with the other contenders including the New Zealand Derby-winning mare Silent Achiever. After tracking the leaders, Reliable Man moved to the outside, accelerated 300 metres from the finish, took the lead went clear to win by two and a half lengths from Dundeel, with the Emirates Stakes winner Happy Trails taking third ahead of Silent Achiever. Reliable Man had faltered in his stride 50 metres from the finish and as he slowed to a trot after the finishing line it became clear that he was badly lame. He had taken from the course in horse ambulance and subsequent veterinary examinations revealed that he had sustained a serious tendon injury to his right foreleg. Bowman, who raised his whip to salute the crowd in the final strides, commented "I didn't realise what had happened until after the line, otherwise I wouldn't have been carrying on like a pork chop". Chris Waller, who had been cleared of a doping charge on the previous day, said "Welcome to A grade – this horse is a serious horse... Thankfully we've delivered because he's already done it in Europe and now he's done it in Australia".

Despite that hopes that he would return later in 2013, Reliable Man did not recover from his injury and was retired from racing.

== Stud record ==
After his retirement from racing became a breeding stallion at the Westbury Stud in New Zealand and being shuttled to stand at the Gestut Röttgen in Germany for the Northern Hemisphere breeding season.

His stud fee in 2021 was $17,500 (GST exclusive).

In February 2026 he was humanely euthanised when suffering complications after surgery to remove a melanoma from under his tail.

=== Notable stock ===
c = colt, f = filly, g = gelding

Foaled	Name	Sex	Major wins
2015	Inspirational Girl	f	Railway Stakes
2015	Sentimental Miss	f	New Zealand Oaks
2016	Miami Bound	f	VRC Oaks
2021	Erle	f	Preis der Diana

== Pedigree ==
Pedigree of Reliable Man, grey stallion, 2008
Sire Dalakhani (IRE) 2000	Darshaan (GB); 1981	Shirley Heights	Mill Reef
Sire Dalakhani (IRE) 2000	Darshaan (GB); 1981	Shirley Heights	Hardiemma
Sire Dalakhani (IRE) 2000	Darshaan (GB); 1981	Delsy	Abdos
Sire Dalakhani (IRE) 2000	Darshaan (GB); 1981	Delsy	Kelty
Sire Dalakhani (IRE) 2000	Daltawa (IRE); 1989	Miswaki	Mr. Prospector
Sire Dalakhani (IRE) 2000	Daltawa (IRE); 1989	Miswaki	Hopespringseternal
Sire Dalakhani (IRE) 2000	Daltawa (IRE); 1989	Damana	Crystal Palace
Sire Dalakhani (IRE) 2000	Daltawa (IRE); 1989	Damana	Denia
Dam On Fair Stage (GB) 1993	Sadler's Wells (USA); 1981	Northern Dancer	Nearctic
Dam On Fair Stage (GB) 1993	Sadler's Wells (USA); 1981	Northern Dancer	Natalma
Dam On Fair Stage (GB) 1993	Sadler's Wells (USA); 1981	Fairy Bridge	Bold Reason
Dam On Fair Stage (GB) 1993	Sadler's Wells (USA); 1981	Fairy Bridge	Special
Dam On Fair Stage (GB) 1993	Fair Salinia (IRE); 1975	Petingo	Petition
Dam On Fair Stage (GB) 1993	Fair Salinia (IRE); 1975	Petingo	Alcazar
Dam On Fair Stage (GB) 1993	Fair Salinia (IRE); 1975	Fair Arabella	Chateaugay
Dam On Fair Stage (GB) 1993	Fair Salinia (IRE); 1975	Fair Arabella	Locust Time (Family 16-c)
