= Shakeel (horse) =

French-bred Thoroughbred racehorse

- Sire: Dalakhani
- Grandsire: Darshaan
- Dam: Shamiyra
- Damsire: Medicean
- Sex: Stallion
- Foaled: 19 February 2014
- Country: France
- Colour: Bay
- Breeder: Aga Khan IV
- Owner: Aga Khan IV
- Trainer: Alain de Royer-Dupré
- Record: 6: 2-1-3
- Earnings: £346,345

Major wins
- Grand Prix de Paris (2017)

Shakeel (foaled 19 February 2014) is a French Thoroughbred racehorse and sire. After running third on his only start as a juvenile in 2016 he made steady progress to become a top-class performer in the following year. He won a maiden race at Chantilly Racecourse in April and was placed in both the Prix du Lys and the Prix Hocquart before recording his biggest win in the Grand Prix de Paris. He failed to recover from injuries sustained in the race and was retired from racing at the end of the year.

== Background ==
Shakeel is a bay horse with no white markings bred in France by his owner, Aga Khan IV. She was sent into training with Alain de Royer-Dupré and was ridden in all of his races by Christophe Soumillon.

He was sired by Dalakhani, who was named Cartier Horse of the Year in 2003 after wins in the Prix Lupin, Prix du Jockey Club and Prix de l'Arc de Triomphe. As a breeding stallion his other offspring have included Conduit, Duncan, Integral and Reliable Man. Shakeel's dam Shamiyra never raced but was a half-sister to the Prix Allez France winner Shemiyla. She was a granddaughter of the Poule d'Essai des Pouliches winner Shemaka and closely related to Shahrastani.

== Racing career ==
=== 2016: two-year-old season ===
Shakeel began his racing career on 18 November when he started at odds of 5/1 for a maiden race over 2000 metres at Saint-Cloud Racecourse and finished third, two and three quarter lengths behind the winner Go Fast.

=== 2017: three-year-old season ===
On his three-year-old debut Shakeel third behind Plumatic in a maiden at Saint-Cloud in March and then started 1.7/1 favourite for a similar event over 2000 metres at Chantilly Racecourse on 20 April in which recorded his first success as he won by three quarters of a length from Malkoboy. For his next race the colt was stepped up in class and distance for the Group 3 Prix du Lys over 2400 metres at Saint-Cloud in May for which he started favourite but was beaten into third behind Called to the Bar and Ice Breeze, beaten three lengths by the winner. In the Group 2 Prix Hocquart at Chantilly in June he took the lead in the last 600 metres but was caught by Ice Breeze in the closing stages and beaten a head into second place.

On 14 July Shakeel was one of nine three-year-old colts to contest the Grand Prix de Paris, which was run that year at Saint-Cloud rather than Longchamp as the latter track was closed for improvements. The British colt Permian (winner of the Dante Stakes and King Edward VII Stakes) started favourite ahead of Parabellum, Orderofthegarter (Leopardstown 2,000 Guineas Trial Stakes) and Ice Breeze with Shakeel the 5.7/1 fifth choice in the betting just ahead of the Italian Derby winner Mac Mahon. After settling in mid-division as Permian made the running he began to make steady progress in the straight and moved up alongside the leader with 100 metres left to run. Although the favourite rallied in the final strides Shakeel prevailed by a nose with the Irish-trained outsider Venice Beach a length away in third. A spokesman for the Aga Khan said "I don't think we necessarily expected Shakeel to win, but we expected to run well and to win was great... He's still an immature horse, but he is improving in his work and on the track."

He sustained an injury in the Grand Prix and did not recover sufficiently to take his place in the field for the Prix de l'Arc de Triomphe and was retired from racing.

== Stud record ==
After his retirement from racing Shakeel became a breeding stallion in Ireland. He was initially based at the Clongiffen Stud in County Meath.

== Pedigree ==
Pedigree of Shakeel, bay stallion, 2014
Sire Dalakhani (IRE) 2000	Darshaan (GB); 1981	Shirley Heights	Mill Reef (USA)
Sire Dalakhani (IRE) 2000	Darshaan (GB); 1981	Shirley Heights	Hardiemma
Sire Dalakhani (IRE) 2000	Darshaan (GB); 1981	Delsy (FR)	Abdos
Sire Dalakhani (IRE) 2000	Darshaan (GB); 1981	Delsy (FR)	Kelty
Sire Dalakhani (IRE) 2000	Daltawa; 1989	Miswaki (USA)	Mr. Prospector
Sire Dalakhani (IRE) 2000	Daltawa; 1989	Miswaki (USA)	Hopespringseternal
Sire Dalakhani (IRE) 2000	Daltawa; 1989	Damana (FR)	Crystal Palace
Sire Dalakhani (IRE) 2000	Daltawa; 1989	Damana (FR)	Denia
Dam Shamiyra (FR) 2009	Medicean (GB); 1997	Machiavellian (USA)	Mr. Prospector
Dam Shamiyra (FR) 2009	Medicean (GB); 1997	Machiavellian (USA)	Coup de Folie
Dam Shamiyra (FR) 2009	Medicean (GB); 1997	Mystic Goddess (USA)	Storm Bird (CAN)
Dam Shamiyra (FR) 2009	Medicean (GB); 1997	Mystic Goddess (USA)	Rose Goddess (IRE)
Dam Shamiyra (FR) 2009	Shemala (IRE); 2000	Danehill (USA)	Danzig
Dam Shamiyra (FR) 2009	Shemala (IRE); 2000	Danehill (USA)	Razyana
Dam Shamiyra (FR) 2009	Shemala (IRE); 2000	Shemaka	Nishapour
Dam Shamiyra (FR) 2009	Shemala (IRE); 2000	Shemaka	Shashna (Family 3-o)
