= Banassa =

French-bred Thoroughbred racehorse

- Sire: Un Gaillard
- Grandsire: Biribi
- Dam: Fatou Gaye
- Damsire: Fair Copy
- Sex: Filly
- Foaled: 1950
- Country: France
- Colour: Chestnut
- Breeder: Julien Décrion
- Owner: Julien Décrion
- Trainer: William Head
- Record: not found
- Earnings: not found

Major wins
- Prix Cléopâtre (1953); Prix Boiard (1954); Prix du Prince d'Orange (1954); Grand Prix de Saint-Cloud (1954); Prix Jean Prat (1955)

Honours
- Prix Banassa at Saint-Cloud Racecourse

Banassa (foaled 1950) was a French Thoroughbred racehorse bred and raced by Julien Décrion. Named for an ancient Roman village in Morocco, she was sired by Décrion's multiple race winner Un Gaillard and out of his mare, Fatou Gaye.

Banassa was trained by William Head, a descendant of the founders of the English Racing Colony at Chantilly. Ridden by Claudius Lalanne, as a three-year-old Banassa won the Prix Cléopâtre and was second in the French Classic, the Prix de Diane. At age four, at the Saint-Cloud Racecourse, she won the Prix Boiard and the Grand Prix de Saint-Cloud. At Longchamp Racecourse Banassa won the Prix du Prince d'Orange, a prep race for the Prix de l'Arc de Triomphe in which she finished second to Sica Boy. Her owner then sent her to Laurel Park Racecourse in Laurel, Maryland, in the United States where as the betting favorite ran second to Fisherman in the Washington, D.C. International Stakes. Racing at age five, Banassa's best result in 1955 was a win in the Prix Jean Prat.
