= Sun Cap =

French-bred Thoroughbred racehorse

- Sire: Sunny Boy
- Grandsire: Jock
- Dam: Cappellina
- Damsire: Le Capucin
- Sex: Mare
- Foaled: 1951
- Country: France
- Colour: Grey
- Breeder: Robert Forget
- Owner: Robert Forget
- Trainer: Reginald Carver

Major wins
- Prix Penelope (1954); Epsom Oaks (1954)

Awards
- Timeform rating 123 (1954)

Sun Cap (1951 – after 1968) was a French Thoroughbred racehorse and broodmare. After failing to win as a two-year-old in 1953 she won the Prix Penelope in the following April and then recorded her biggest win in the Epsom Oaks. After her retirement from racing she produced several minor winners but no top-class performers.

== Background ==
Sun Cap was a grey mare bred in France by Robert Forget. During her racing career she was owned by Forget's wife and trained at Chantilly by Reg Carver.

Her sire Sunny Boy was a good racehorse but a much better breeding stallion and was the Leading sire in France in 1954. His other foals included Sica Boy (Prix de l'Arc de Triomphe) and Tamanar (Prix du Jockey Club). Sun Cap's dam Cappellina, from whom she inherited her grey colour, won only two minor races from thirty-two starts but did better as a broodmare, producing the Prix Jean Prat winner La Varende, as well as Bebob, the female-line ancestor of Stop The Music and Spend A Buck's sire Buckaroo.

== Racing career ==
=== 1953: two-year-old season ===
As a two-year-old in 1953 Sun Cap ran four times but failed to win a race.

=== 1954: three-year-old season ===
Sun Cap began her second season by winning the Prix Penelope over 2100 metres at Saint-Cloud Racecourse on 18 April at odds of 30/1.

The 176th running of the Oaks Stakes over one and a half miles at Epsom Racecourse on 4 June attracted a field of twenty-one fillies with Sun Cap, ridden by the Australian jockey Rae Johnstone, being one of four French challengers. The betting for the race was unusually open with Altana (third in the Grand Critérium) and Sybil's Niece (Queen Mary Stakes) starting 8/1 joint-favourites ahead of Bara Bibi (Princess Elizabeth Stakes) and Amora (Cheshire Oaks) with Sun Cap next in the betting on 100/8 alongside Festoon and Angel Bright (Lingfield Oaks Trial). Sun Cap took the lead approaching the final furlong and drew away to win the race "with the utmost ease" by six lengths from Altana with Philante taking third to complete a 1-2-3 for France.

== Assessment and honours ==
The independent Timeform organisation awarded Sun Cap a rating of 123 in 1954.

In their book, A Century of Champions, based on the Timeform rating system, John Randall and Tony Morris rated Sun Cap an "inferior" winner of the Oaks.

== Breeding record ==
At the end of her racing career Sun Cap was bought by Lady Macdonald-Buchanan and was retired to become a broodmare. She produced at least eight foals and five winners between 1956 and 1968:

- Capuchon, a grey colt, foaled in 1956, sired by Abernant. Winner.
- Welsh Bonnet, chestnut filly, 1957, by Owen Tudor
- Crash Helmet, bay colt, 1958, by Never Say Die
- In The Gloaming, bay colt 1960, by Crepello. Won Warren Stakes.
- Polaroid, grey colt, 1964, by Crepello. Winner.
- Imperial Crown, bay colt, 1966, by Aureole. Winner.
- Biretta, grey colt, 1967, by St Paddy. Winner.
- Head Gear, chestnut colt (later gelded), 1968, by Aureole

== Pedigree ==
Pedigree of Sun Cap (FR), grey mare, 1951
Sire Sunny Boy (FR) 1944	Jock; 1936	Asterus	Teddy
Sire Sunny Boy (FR) 1944	Jock; 1936	Asterus	Astrella
Sire Sunny Boy (FR) 1944	Jock; 1936	Naic	Gainsborough (GB)
Sire Sunny Boy (FR) 1944	Jock; 1936	Naic	Only One
Sire Sunny Boy (FR) 1944	Fille de Soleil (GB); 1935	Solario (IRE)	Gainsborough (GB)
Sire Sunny Boy (FR) 1944	Fille de Soleil (GB); 1935	Solario (IRE)	Sun Worship (GB)
Sire Sunny Boy (FR) 1944	Fille de Soleil (GB); 1935	Fille de Salut	Sansovino
Sire Sunny Boy (FR) 1944	Fille de Soleil (GB); 1935	Fille de Salut	Friar's Daughter
Dam Cappellina (FR) 1940	Le Capucin; 1920	Nimbus	Elf
Dam Cappellina (FR) 1940	Le Capucin; 1920	Nimbus	Nephte
Dam Cappellina (FR) 1940	Le Capucin; 1920	Carmen (GB)	Sidus
Dam Cappellina (FR) 1940	Le Capucin; 1920	Carmen (GB)	La Figlia
Dam Cappellina (FR) 1940	Bellina; 1930	Belfonds	Isard
Dam Cappellina (FR) 1940	Bellina; 1930	Belfonds	La Buire
Dam Cappellina (FR) 1940	Bellina; 1930	Edwina	Teddy
Dam Cappellina (FR) 1940	Bellina; 1930	Edwina	Sun Luck (Family: 11-g)

- Sun Cap was inbred 4 × 4 to both Teddy and Gainsborough, meaning that these stallions appear twice in the fourth generation of her pedigree.
