= New Bay =

British-bred Thoroughbred racehorse

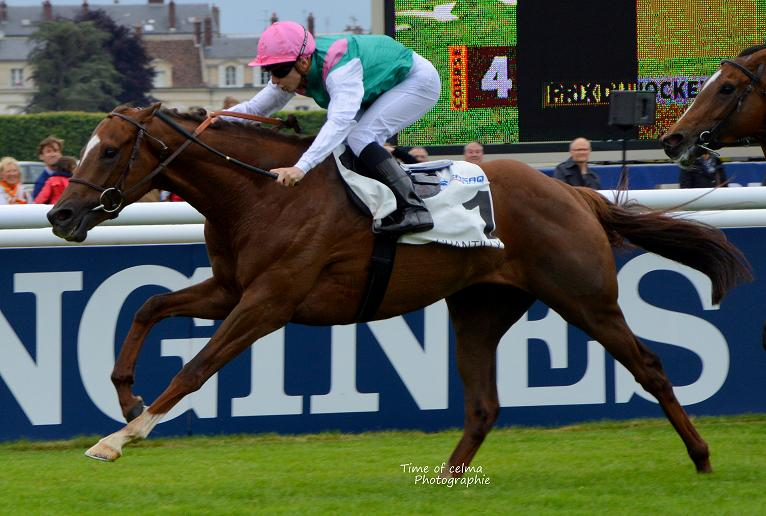
- Sire: Dubawi
- Grandsire: Dubai Millennium
- Dam: Cinnamon Bay
- Damsire: Zamindar
- Sex: Stallion
- Foaled: 14 February 2012
- Country: United Kingdom
- Colour: Chestnut
- Breeder: Juddmonte Farms
- Owner: Khalid Abdullah
- Trainer: André Fabre
- Record: 11: 5-2-1
- Earnings: £1,523,281

Major wins
- Prix du Jockey Club (2015); Prix Guillaume d'Ornano (2015); Prix Niel (2015); Prix Gontaut-Biron (2016)
- Last updated on 16 August 2016

New Bay (foaled 14 February 2012) is a British-bred, French-trained Thoroughbred racehorse and breeding stallion. As a three-year-old in 2015 he won the Prix du Jockey Club, Prix Guillaume d'Ornano and Prix Niel before finishing third in the Prix de l'Arc de Triomphe.

== Background ==
New Bay is a chestnut colt with a large, diamond-shaped white star and three white socks, bred in England by his owner, Khalid Abdulla's Juddmonte Farms. He was sired by Dubawi a top-class son of Dubai Millennium, whose wins included the Irish 2,000 Guineas and the Prix Jacques Le Marois. At stud, Dubawi has been a highly-successful breeding stallion, siring major winners such as Monterosso, Al Kazeem, Makfi, Lucky Nine and Night of Thunder. New Bay's dam Cinnamon Bay won three times including a success in the Listed Prix d'Angerville at Chantilly Racecourse in 2007. Cinnamon Bay was a granddaughter of Bahamian, whose other descendants have included Oasis Dream, Wemyss Bight (Irish Oaks), Beat Hollow and Zenda.

The colt was sent into training with André Fabre in France.

== Racing career ==
=== 2014: two-year-old season ===
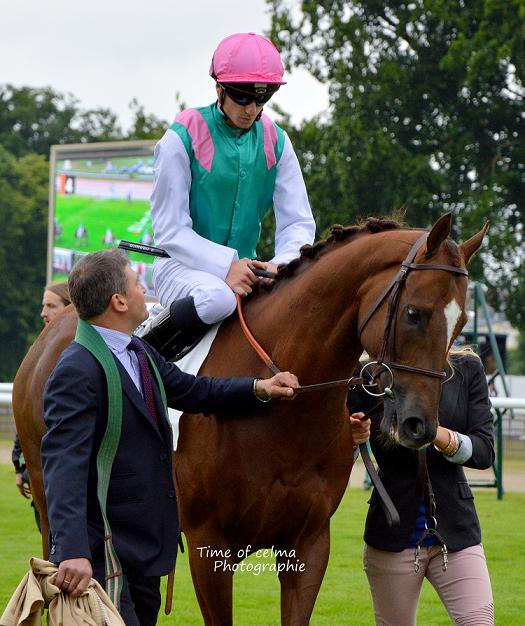
New bay au défilé du Prix du Jockey Club 2015

On his only appearance as a juvenile, New Bay contested a race over 1600 metres on the Polytrack surface at Chantilly on 25 November. Ridden by Maxime Guyon he started the 6/5 favourite and finished well but was beaten two lengths into second by the Freddy Head-trained Urjuwaan.

=== 2015: three-year-old season ===
In 2015 New Bay was ridden in all of his races by the former steeplechase jockey Vincent Cheminaud. He made his seasonal reappearance, and his debut on turf, in the Prix Machado over 1600 metres at Longchamp Racecourse on 20 April. He raced in second before taking the lead 200 metres out and won by a length from the favourite Tale of Life. Over the same course and distance three weeks later he was moved up in class and started a 16/1 outsider for the Group One Poule d'Essai des Poulains. He was towards the rear for most of the way before finishing strongly to take second place, three lengths behind the winner Make Believe. On 31 May, New Bay started the 3/1 second favourite in a fourteen-runner field for 178th running of the Prix du Jockey Club over 2100 metres at Chantilly. Karaktar headed the betting after winning the Prix Noailles whilst the other leading contenders included Silverwave (Prix La Force), Sumbal (Prix Greffulhe), War Dispatch (Prix de Guiche) and Highland Reel (Vintage Stakes). Cheminaud held the colt up at the rear of the field before beginning to make progress in the straight. Despite hanging to the right he accelerated into the lead 200 metres out and won by one and a half lengths from Highland Reel with War Dispatch taking third ahead of the outsider Piment Rouge. Khalid Abdulla's racing manager Teddy Grimthorpe commented The great quality of the horse is his turn of foot. He was very calm before the race. He is capable of changing his speed, which characterizes the great horses".

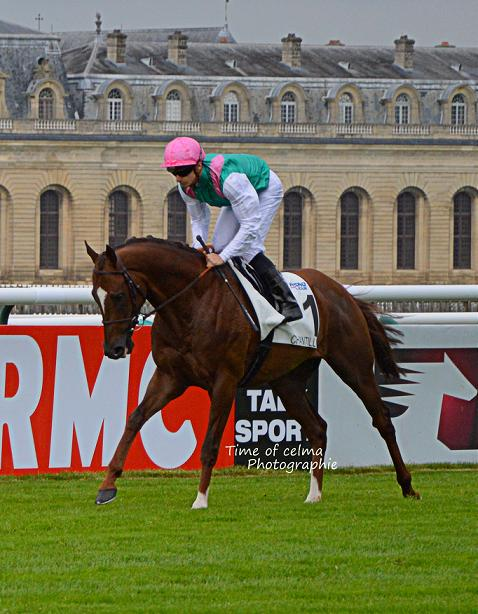
New bay se rend au stalles de départ

After a two and a half month break, New Bay returned in the Group Two Prix Guillume d'Ornano over 2000 metres on heavy ground at Deauville Racecourse on 15 August. He started the odds-on favourite against five opponents including the Prix Hocquart winner Ampere and Prix Eugène Adam winner Dariyan. After racing in second place, he took the lead 400 metres out and won by one and a half lengths from Dariyan. The colt's next race was the Prix Niel (a major trial race for the Prix de l'Arc de Triomphe) over 2400 metres at Longchamp on 13 September in which he was matched against the Grand Prix de Paris winner Erupt. He was amongst the leaders from soon after the start, took the lead 200 metres from the finish and won by two and a half lengths from Silverwave with Erupt almost nine lengths further back in fourth. After the race Fabre expressed his satisfaction saying "He clearly showed he gets the distance and the ground didn't bother him. It was what he needed and it was a nice, easy race".

On 4 October New Bay started second favourite behind Treve in the Prix de l'Arc de Triomphe. Cheminaud positioned the colt just behind the leaders on the inside as Shahah set the pace from Golden Horn. He stayed on strongly in the straight to finish third of the seventeen runners behind Golden Horn and Flintshire.

=== 2016: four-year-old season ===
New Bay began his third season in the Prix d'Ispahan on 24 May: the race was run at Chantilly as Longchamp was closed for redevelopment during 2016. He was made the 6/4 favourite but ra poorly and finished sixth behind the Japanese five-year-old A Shin Hikari. New Bay was off the racecourse for almost three months before being dropped in class for the Group Three Prix Gontaut-Biron over 2000 metres at Deauville in August. Starting the odds-on favourite against four opponents, he took the lead 400 metres from the finish and won by one and a half lengths from Arthenus. In September, New Bay ventured beyond France for the first time when he was one of twelve horses to contest a strong renewal of the Irish Champion Stakes at Leopardstown Racecourse. Starting at odds of 9/1 he took the lead a furlong out but was outpaced in the closing stages and finished fourth behind Almanzor, Found and Minding. In his second attempt at the Prix de l'Arc de Triomphe at Chantilly on 2 October New Bay was the best-fancied of the French runners on 9/1 but never looked likely to win and finished seventh behind Found.

== Stud career ==
New Bay was retired from racing at the end of 2016 and began his career as a breeding stallion in 2017 at the Ballylinch Stud. Among his ownership is Juddmonte Farm and China Horse Club.

=== Notable progeny ===
c = colt, f = filly, g = gelding

Foaled	Name	Dam	Dam's sire	Sex	Major wins
2018	Saffron Beach	Falling Petals	Raven's Pass	f	Sun Chariot Stakes, Prix Rothschild
2018	Bay Bridge	Hayyona	Multiplex	c	Champion Stakes
2019	Bayside Boy	Alava	Anabaa	c	Queen Elizabeth II Stakes
2022	Bay City Roller	Bloomfield	Teofilo	c	Grosser Preis von Bayern, Coronation Cup

== Pedigree ==
Pedigree of New Bay (GB), chestnut colt, 2012
Sire Dubawi (IRE) 2002	Dubai Millennium (GB); 1996	Seeking the Gold	Mr. Prospector
Sire Dubawi (IRE) 2002	Dubai Millennium (GB); 1996	Seeking the Gold	Con Game
Sire Dubawi (IRE) 2002	Dubai Millennium (GB); 1996	Colorado Dancer	Shareef Dancer
Sire Dubawi (IRE) 2002	Dubai Millennium (GB); 1996	Colorado Dancer	Fall Aspen
Sire Dubawi (IRE) 2002	Zomaradah (GB); 1995	Deploy	Shirley Heights
Sire Dubawi (IRE) 2002	Zomaradah (GB); 1995	Deploy	Slightly Dangerous
Sire Dubawi (IRE) 2002	Zomaradah (GB); 1995	Jawaher	Dancing Brave
Sire Dubawi (IRE) 2002	Zomaradah (GB); 1995	Jawaher	High Tern
Dam Cinnamon Bay (GB) 2004	Zamindar (USA); 1994	Gone West	Mr. Prospector
Dam Cinnamon Bay (GB) 2004	Zamindar (USA); 1994	Gone West	Secrettame
Dam Cinnamon Bay (GB) 2004	Zamindar (USA); 1994	Zaizafon	The Minstrel
Dam Cinnamon Bay (GB) 2004	Zamindar (USA); 1994	Zaizafon	Mofida
Dam Cinnamon Bay (GB) 2004	Trellis Bay (GB); 1996	Sadler's Wells	Northern Dancer
Dam Cinnamon Bay (GB) 2004	Trellis Bay (GB); 1996	Sadler's Wells	Fairy Bridge
Dam Cinnamon Bay (GB) 2004	Trellis Bay (GB); 1996	Bahamian	Mill Reef
Dam Cinnamon Bay (GB) 2004	Trellis Bay (GB); 1996	Bahamian	Sorbus (Family: 19)
