= Prix Penelope =

Flat horse race in France

- Class: Group 3
- Location: Saint-Cloud Racecourse; Saint-Cloud, France
- Inaugurated: 1905
- Race type: Flat / Thoroughbred
- Website: france-galop.com

Race information
- Distance: 2,100 metres (1m 2½f)
- Surface: Turf
- Track: Left-handed
- Qualification: Three-year-old fillies
- Weight: 57 kg
- Purse: €80,000 (2019); 1st: €50,400

Prix Penelope
2024
Making Dreams	Sheema's Rose	Je Zous

Previous years
2023
Pensee Du Jour	Sea Of Roses	Be Happy
2022
Agave	Queen Trezy	Anne De Cleves
2021
Philomene	Incarville	Anasia

2020-2011
2019
Cartiem	Phoceene	Romanciere
2018
Luminate	Homerique	Tosen Gift
2017
Sistercharlie	Listen In	Rythmique
2016
Camprock	The Juliet Rose	Jadhaba
2015
Queen's Jewel	Spring Leaf	Princess Charm
2014
Goldy Espony	Hug And A Kiss	Stormyra
2013
Ferevia	Baltic Baroness	La Banderilla
2012
Waldlerche	Crecy	Rjwa
2011
Don't Hurry Me	Pirika	Skallet

2010-2001
2010
Dariole	Middle Club	A Media Luz
2009
Celimene	Plumania	Villa Molitor
2008
Gagnoa	Top Toss	Sanjida
2007
Mrs Lindsay	Sismix	Topka
2006
Germance	Sanaya	Alix Road
2005
Perfect Hedge	Argentina	Hermance
2004
Ask For The Moon	Super Lina	Miss France
2003
Humouresque	Sweet Folly	Commercante
2002
Ombre Legere	Dzinigane	Kapria
2001
Baldwina	Nadia	Bellona

2000-1990
2000
Volvoreta	Reve D'Oscar	Sadler's Flag
1999
La Sylphide	Aubergade	Sunday Picnic
1998
Abbatiale	Welsh Autumn	Chine
1997
Brilliance	Darashandeh	La Nana
1996
Tulipa	Camille	Amiarma
1995
Muncie	Loretta Gianni	Valley Of Gold
1994
Diamond Dance	Misbegotten	Sapsa Tango
1993
Wemyss Bight	Dancienne	Miss Kadrou
1992
Trampoli	Daltawa	Good To Dance
1991
La Monalisa	Legataire	Crnagora
1990
Air De Rien	Whitehaven	Fleet Fairy

The Prix Penelope is a Group 3 flat horse race in France open to three-year-old thoroughbred fillies. It is run over a distance of 2,100 metres (about 1 mile and 2½ furlongs) at Saint-Cloud in March or April.

== History ==
The event is named after two different horses called Penelope – a leading British broodmare foaled in 1798, and the winner of the Prix Royal foaled in 1820.

The Prix Penelope was established in 1905, and it was originally staged at Maisons-Laffitte. It was initially contested over 2,000 metres.

The race was abandoned throughout World War I, with no running from 1915 to 1919. It was held at Saint-Cloud in 1921, and moved there more permanently in 1927.

The Prix Penelope took place at Longchamp from 1940 to 1942, and switched to Maisons-Laffitte in 1943. It was extended to 2,100 metres in 1944. It returned to Saint-Cloud and reverted to 2,000 metres in 1946. It was restored to 2,100 metres in 1950.

The present race grading system was introduced in 1971, and the Prix Penelope was subsequently classed at Group 3 level.

The Prix Penelope can serve as a trial for the Prix de Diane. The last horse to win both events was Pawneese in 1976.

== Records ==
Leading jockey (5 wins):

- George Stern – Muskerry (1905), Sais (1906), Roselys (1914), Samic (1921), Zariba (1922)
- Rae Johnstone – La Futaie (1940), Sylphide (1947), Corseira (1950), Arbele (1952), Sun Cap (1954)
- Thierry Jarnet – Madame Est Sortie (1988), Wemyss Bight (1993), Diamond Dance (1994), Tulipa (1996), La Sylphide (1999)

Leading trainer (10 wins):

- André Fabre – Trampoli (1992), Wemyss Bight (1993), Diamond Dance (1994), Muncie (1995), Tulipa (1996), Gagnoa (2008), Waldlerche (2012), Philomene (2021), Agave (2022), Pensee Du Jour (2023)

Leading owner (10 wins):

- Marcel Boussac – Samic (1921), Zariba (1922), Diademe (1930), Canzoni (1939), Esmeralda (1942), Corseira (1950), Arbele (1952), Adarca (1953), Janiari (1956), Demia (1977)

== Winners since 1981 ==
Year	Winner	Jockey	Trainer	Owner	Time
1981	Last Love	Serge Gorli	Patrick Biancone	Serge Lederman
1982	All Along	Serge Gorli	Patrick Biancone	Daniel Wildenstein	2:23.40
1983	Smuggly	Alain Badel	Olivier Douieb	Edward Seltzer
1984	Pampa Bella	Alain Badel	Jean-François Daubin	Mrs A. Daubin
1985	Blue Tip	Cash Asmussen	Freddie Palmer	David d'Albis
1986	Termienne	Dominique Boeuf	Jean-Paul Gallorini	Philippe Faucampre
1987	Productive	Freddy Head	J. C. Cunnington	George Ohrstrom
1988	Madame Est Sortie	Thierry Jarnet	Yann-Marie Porzier	Gerald Levi	2:34.20
1989	Behera	Tony Cruz	Alain de Royer-Dupré	HH Aga Khan IV	2:16.10
1990	Air de Rien	Alain Badel	Myriam Bollack-Badel	Jacques Berès	2:13.50
1991	La Monalisa	Dominique Boeuf	Élie Lellouche	Edgard Zorbibe	2:15.30
1992	Trampoli	Sylvain Guillot	André Fabre	Paul de Moussac	2:18.70
1993	Wemyss Bight	Thierry Jarnet	André Fabre	Khalid Abdullah	2:20.50
1994	Diamond Dance	Thierry Jarnet	André Fabre	Jean-Luc Lagardère	2:18.70
1995	Muncie	Olivier Peslier	André Fabre	Daniel Wildenstein	2:21.30
1996	Tulipa	Thierry Jarnet	André Fabre	Sheikh Mohammed	2:15.70
1997	Brilliance	Sylvain Guillot	Pascal Bary	Ecurie Skymarc Farm	2:17.90
1998	Abbatiale	Frédéric Sanchez	Dominique Sépulchre	Georges Coude	2:27.60
1999	La Sylphide	Thierry Jarnet	Nicolas Clément	Sibylle Egloff	2:28.20
2000	Volvoreta	Thierry Thulliez	Carlos Lerner	Maria-Soledad Vidal	2:21.90
2001	Baldwina	François-Xavier Bertras	François Rohaut	Bernard Cazenave	2:41.30
2002	Ombre Legere	Stéphane Pasquier	Élie Lellouche	Ecurie Ferdane	2:19.50
2003	Humouresque	Thierry Thulliez	Sir Mark Prescott	Cheveley Park Stud	2:17.90
2004	Ask for the Moon	Ioritz Mendizabal	Jean-Claude Rouget	Jean-Pierre Dubois	2:17.10
2005	Perfect Hedge	Thierry Thulliez	Nicolas Clément	NP Bloodstock Ltd	2:22.10
2006	Germance	Ioritz Mendizabal	Jean-Claude Rouget	Nelson Radwan	2:20.10
2007	Mrs Lindsay	Stéphane Pasquier	François Rohaut	Bettina Jenney	2:17.20
2008	Gagnoa	Stéphane Pasquier	André Fabre	Smith / Tabor / Magnier	2:23.10
2009	Celimene	Yann Lerner	Carlos Lerner	Gérard Laboureau	2:21.30
2010	Dariole	Grégory Benoist	Pascal Bary	Helen Barbe	2:19.90
2011	Don't Hurry Me	Ioritz Mendizabal	Jean-Claude Rouget	Jean-François Gribomont	2:17.20
2012	Waldlerche	Maxime Guyon	André Fabre	Gestüt Bernried	2:19.80
2013	Ferevia	Olivier Peslier	Carlos Laffon-Parias	Leonidas Marinopoulos	2:23.40
2014	Goldy Espony	Fabrice Veron	Henri-Alex Pantall	Henri-Alex Pantall	2:17.16
2015	Queen's Jewel	Maxime Guyon	Freddy Head	Wertheimer et Frère	2:18.19
2016	Camprock	Maxime Guyon	Pia Brandt	Ecurie du Grand Chene	2:23.01
2017	Sistercharlie	Maxime Guyon	Henri-Alex Pantall	Mme Jacques Cygler	2:19.06
2018	Luminate	Olivier Peslier	Freddy Head	Highclere Thoroughbred Racing	2:13.08
2019	Cartiem	Cristian Demuro	Jean-Claude Rouget	G Augustin-Normand et al.	2:16.14
	no race 2020 (Note: The 2020 running was cancelled because of the COVID-19 pandemic in France)
2021	Philomene	Mickael Barzalona	André Fabre	Godolphin / Monceaux / Skymarc	2:15.68
2022	Agave	Olivier Peslier	André Fabre	Exors of the late K Abdullah	2:18.15
2023	Pensee Du Jour	Bauyrzhan Murzabayev	André Fabre	Ballymore Thoroughbred Ltd	2:14.30
2024	Making Dreams	Alexis Pouchin	Karl Burke	Bradley Racing / Burke	2:37.71
2025	Tajlina	Mickael Barzalona	Francis-Henri Graffard	Al Asayl France	2:18.91

== Earlier winners ==
- 1905: Muskerry
- 1906: Sais
- 1907: All Mine
- 1908: Scarlet
- 1909: Pierre Benite
- 1910: Madeleine
- 1911: La Becasse
- 1912: Mongolie
- 1913: Sweetness
- 1914: Roselys
- 1915–19: no race
- 1920: Flowershop
- 1921: Samic
- 1922: Zariba
- 1923: Fiasque
- 1924: Isola Bella
- 1925: Gandourah
- 1926: Briseis
- 1927: Carmelite
- 1928: Tanais
- 1929: Tour Eiffel
- 1930: Diademe
- 1931: Brulette
- 1932: Incessu Patuit
- 1933: Bipearl
- 1934: Rarity
- 1935: Clairvoyante
- 1936: Royalebuchy
- 1937: Sylvanire
- 1938: Feerie
- 1939: Canzoni
- 1940: La Futaie
- 1941: Longthanh
- 1942: Esmeralda
- 1943: Folle Nuit
- 1944: Chambriere
- 1945: Raita
- 1946: Pirette
- 1947: Sylphide
- 1948: Princesse Kara
- 1949: Cretonne
- 1950: Corseira
- 1951: Simonetta
- 1952: Arbele
- 1953: Adarca
- 1954: Sun Cap
- 1955: Senones
- 1956: Janiari
- 1957: Piriere
- 1958: Dushka
- 1959: Favreale / Ma Princesse (Note: The 1959 race was a dead-heat and has joint winners)
- 1960: Timandra
- 1961: Hermieres
- 1962: Monade
- 1963: Maintenon
- 1964: Carolle II
- 1965: Cassette
- 1966: Kaliopi
- 1967: Straight On
- 1968: Roseliere
- 1969: Saraca
- 1970: Hether
- 1971: Cigaline
- 1972: Rescousse
- 1973: Brave Ketty
- 1974: Pale Ale
- 1975: Petit Monstre
- 1976: Pawneese
- 1977: Demia
- 1978: Tempus Fugit
- 1979: Saloon
- 1980: Good to Beat

== See also ==
- List of French flat horse races
