= 1993 Prix de l'Arc de Triomphe =

- Location: Longchamp Racecourse
- Date: October 3, 1993
- Winning horse: Urban Sea

The 1993 Prix de l'Arc de Triomphe was a horse race held at Longchamp on Sunday 3 October 1993. It was the 72nd running of the Prix de l'Arc de Triomphe.

The winner was Urban Sea, a four-year-old filly trained in France by Jean Lesbordes. The winning jockey was Eric Saint-Martin.

== Race details ==
- Sponsor: CIGA Hotels
- Purse: 8,500,000 F; First prize: 5,000,000 F
- Going: Heavy
- Distance: 2,400 metres
- Number of runners: 23
- Winner's time: 2m 37.9s

== Full result ==
Pos.	Marg.	Horse	Age	Jockey	Trainer (Country)
1		Urban Sea	4	Eric Saint-Martin	Jean Lesbordes (FR)
2	nk	White Muzzle	3	John Reid	Peter Chapple-Hyam (GB)
3	½	Opera House	5	Michael Roberts	Michael Stoute (GB)
4	¾	Intrepidity	3	Thierry Jarnet	André Fabre (FR)
5	1	Only Royale	4	Ray Cochrane	Luca Cumani (GB)
6	1½	Bob's Return	3	Philip Robinson	Mark Tompkins (GB)
7	¾	Misil	5	Frankie Dettori	Vittorio Caruso (ITY)
8	½	Talloires	3	Olivier Peslier	André Fabre (FR)
9	1½	Vert Amande	5	Freddy Head	Élie Lellouche (FR)
10	1½	Market Booster	4	Michael Kinane	Dermot Weld (IRE)
11	1½	Dariyoun	5	Olivier Doleuze	Carlos Laffon-Parias (FR)
12	2½	Dancienne	3	Dominique Boeuf	Élie Lellouche (FR)
13	½	Platini	4	Mark Rimmer	Bruno Schütz (GER)
14	nk	Badolato	3	Jean-Michel Breux	Antonio Spanu (FR)
15	hd	Armiger	3	Willie Carson	Henry Cecil (GB)
16	hd	Hernando	3	Cash Asmussen	François Boutin (FR)
17	¾	Ezzoud	4	Walter Swinburn	Michael Stoute (GB)
18	½	Bright Moon	3	Sylvain Guillot	André Fabre (FR)
19	hd	Garden of Heaven	4	Richard Quinn	Clive Brittain (GB)
20	hd	Always Friendly	5	Alan Munro	Henry Candy (GB)
21	¾	Wemyss Bight	3	Pat Eddery	André Fabre (FR)
22	2	User Friendly	4	George Duffield	Clive Brittain (GB)
23	15	Shemaka	3	Gérald Mossé	Alain de Royer-Dupré (FR)

- Abbreviations: hd = head; nk = neck

== Winner's details ==
Further details of the winner, Urban Sea.

- Sex: Filly
- Foaled: 18 February 1989
- Country: United States
- Sire: Miswaki; Dam: Allegretta (Lombard)
- Owner: David Tsui
- Breeder: Marystead Farm
