= Prix Cléopâtre =

Flat horse race in France

- Class: Group 3
- Location: Saint-Cloud Racecourse; Saint-Cloud, France
- Inaugurated: 1952
- Race type: Flat / Thoroughbred
- Website: france-galop.com

Race information
- Distance: 2,100 metres (1m 2½f)
- Surface: Turf
- Track: Left-handed
- Qualification: Three-year-old fillies
- Weight: 55 kg Penalties; 4 kg for Group 1 winners 3 kg for Group 2 winners 2 kg for Group 3 winners
- Purse: €80,000 (2017); 1st: €40,000

Prix Cléopâtre
2025
Zia Agnese	Tajlina	Indalimos

Previous years
2024
Halfday	Fun With Flags	War Chimes
2023
Crown Princesse	Elusive Princess	Heartache Tonight
2022
Place Du Carrousel	Samahram	Kawida
2021
Harajuku	Incarville	Crohanne

2020-2011
2020
Neige Blanche	Flighty Lady	World Peace
2019
Etoile	Villa D'Amore	Volskha
2018
Castellar	Amazing Lips	Beagling
2017
Terrakova	Panthelia	Penny Lane
2016
Highlands Queen	Mango Tango	Apple Betty
2015
Little Nightingale	Al Naamah	Stay The Night
2014
Shamkala	Amour A Papa	Hug And A Kiss
2013
Baltic Baroness	Santa Ponsa	Eleuthera
2012
Dalkala	Poupee Flash	La Conquerante
2011
Galikova	Adventure Seeker	Wavering

2010–2001
2010
Sandbar	Pearl Away	Heaven's Vault
2009
Flying Cloud	Board Meeting	Excellent Girl
2008
Leo's Starlet	Antiquities	Sanjida
2007
Vadapolina	Chill	Terra Incognita
2006
Alloway	Sanaya	Wingspan
2005
Vadawina	Montare	Green Girl
2004
Steel Princess	Love And Bubbles	Barancella
2003
Sweet Folly	Baie	Vallee Enchantee
2002
Turtle Bow	Totally Cosmic	Behreyma
2001
Spring Oak	Epistole	Zghorta

2000–1998
2000
Gold Round	Seattle Bay	Darakiyla
1999
Sunday Picnic	Side Saddle	Farfala
1998
Diamonixa	Another Dancer	Minority

The Prix Cléopâtre is a Group 3 flat horse race in France open to three-year-old thoroughbred fillies. It is run over a distance of 2,100 metres (about 1 mile and 2½ furlongs) at Saint-Cloud in May.

== History ==
Named after Cleopatra, the event was established at Saint-Cloud in 1952. The first running was won by Marche Lorraine.

The race was temporarily switched to Maisons-Laffitte in 1990. It was staged at Évry in 1991. It returned to Saint-Cloud in 1992.

The Prix Cléopâtre sometimes serves as a trial for the Prix de Diane. The last horse to win both races was Pawneese in 1976.

== Records ==
Leading jockey (5 wins):

- Olivier Peslier – Diamonixa (1998), Sunday Picnic (1999), Spring Oak (2001), Turtle Bow (2002), Galikova (2011)

Leading trainer (13 wins):

- André Fabre – Wemyss Bight (1993), Valley of Gold (1995), Allurement (1997), Diamonixa (1998), Sunday Picnic (1999), Spring Oak (2001), Vadawina (2005), Alloway (2006), Vadapolina (2007), Flying Cloud (2009), Baltic Baroness (2013), Harajuka (2021), Place Du Carrousel (2022)

Leading owner (6 wins):

- Guy de Rothschild – Cerisoles (1957), Azulene (1959), Marella (1960), Alphee (1966), Insolite (1971), Indian Rose (1988)
- Aga Khan IV – Kalajana (1994), Kalisi (1996), Vadawina (2005), Vadapolina (2007), Dalkala (2012), Shamkala (2014)

== Winners since 1979 ==
Year	Winner	Jockey	Trainer	Owner	Time
1979	Mabeaute	Philippe Paquet	François Boutin	Marquesa de Moratalla
1980	Hortensia	Alain Lequeux	Olivier Douieb	Robert Sangster	2:13.60
1981	April Run	Philippe Paquet	François Boutin	Diana Firestone	2:20.40
1982	Paradise	Jean-Claude Desaint	Guy Bonnaventure	Nelson Bunker Hunt
1983	Alexandrie	Freddy Head	Alec Head	Jacques Wertheimer	2:24.00
1984	Eastland	Éric Legrix	Patrick Biancone	Bruce McNall	2:27.60
1985	Devalois	Freddy Head	Criquette Head	Ghislaine Head	2:17.00
1986	El Fabulous	Gary W. Moore	Criquette Head	Ecurie Aland
1987	Birthday Fever	Maurice Philipperon	John Cunnington Jr.	Hubertus Liebrecht
1988	Indian Rose	Alain Badel	Jean-Marie Béguigné	Guy de Rothschild	2:15.40
1989	Sudaka	Gérard Dubroeucq	Élie Lellouche	Claude Cohen	2:15.50
1990	Caprarola	Gérald Mossé	François Boutin	Mrs Gerry Oldham	2:12.70
1991	Brooklyn's Dance	Guy Guignard	Criquette Head	Jacques Wertheimer	2:15.27
1992	Garendare	Dominique Boeuf	Élie Lellouche	Daniel Wildenstein	2:16.40
1993	Wemyss Bight	Pat Eddery	André Fabre	Khalid Abdullah	2:16.80
1994	Kalajana	Gérald Mossé	Alain de Royer-Dupré	Aga Khan IV	2:16.10
1995	Valley of Gold	Thierry Jarnet	André Fabre	Sheikh Mohammed	2:20.20
1996	Khalisa	Gérald Mossé	Alain de Royer-Dupré	Aga Khan IV	2:16.50
1997	Allurement	Thierry Jarnet	André Fabre	Sheikh Mohammed	2:20.40
1998	Diamonixa	Olivier Peslier	André Fabre	Jean-Luc Lagardère	2:12.20
1999	Sunday Picnic	Olivier Peslier	André Fabre	Teruya Yoshida	2:17.15
2000	Gold Round	Olivier Doleuze	Criquette Head	Wertheimer et Frère	2:19.20
2001	Spring Oak	Olivier Peslier	André Fabre	Sheikh Mohammed	2:22.57
2002	Turtle Bow	Olivier Peslier	François Rohaut	Andrew Crichton	2:15.20
2003	Sweet Folly	Frankie Dettori	Henri-Alex Pantall	Sheikh Mohammed	2:17.10
2004	Steel Princess	Thierry Jarnet	Richard Gibson	Richard Barnes	2:16.30
2005	Vadawina	Christophe Soumillon	André Fabre	Aga Khan IV	2:12.80
2006	Alloway	Stéphane Pasquier	André Fabre	Haras de la Perelle	2:14.50
2007	Vadapolina	Christophe Soumillon	André Fabre	Aga Khan IV	2:10.30
2008	Leo's Starlet	Christophe Lemaire	Alain de Royer-Dupré	William Preston	2:13.60
2009	Flying Cloud	Maxime Guyon	André Fabre	Sheikh Mohammed	2:13.60
2010	Sandbar	François-Xavier Bertras	François Rohaut	Lady O'Reilly	2:09.30
2011	Galikova	Olivier Peslier	Freddy Head	Wertheimer et Frère	2:08.00
2012	Dalkala	Christophe Lemaire	Alain de Royer-Dupré	Aga Khan IV	2:13.70
2013	Baltic Baroness	Maxime Guyon	André Fabre	Gestut Ammerland	2:16.09
2014	Shamkala	Christophe Soumillon	Alain de Royer-Dupré	Aga Khan IV	2:26.03
2015	Little Nightingale	Umberto Rispoli	Mikel Delzangles	Wildenstein Stables	2:13.21
2016	Highlands Queen	Stéphane Pasquier	Yohan Gourraud	Nathalie Kerjean	2:17.41
2017	Terrakova	Maxime Guyon	Freddy Head	Wertheimer et Frère	2:16.32
2018	Castellar	Olivier Peslier	Carlos Laffon-Parias	Sarl Darpat France	2:11.70
2019	Etoile	Cristian Demuro	Jean-Claude Rouget	Philippe Segalot & Martin S. Schwartz	2:23.07
2020	Neige Blanche (Note: The 2020 race was run at Lyon Parilly in June due to the COVID-19 pandemic in France)	Franck Blondel	Cedric Rossi	M Delaunay & Ecurie Du Sud	2:22.48
2021	Harajuku	Stéphane Pasquier	André Fabre	Flaxman Stables Ireland	2:12.59
2022	Place Du Carrousel	Mickael Barzalona	André Fabre	Al Shaqab Racing & Ballylinch Stud	2:15.38
2023	Crown Princesse	Ioritz Mendizabal	Fabrice Chappet	Haras De Saint Julien & Mme Regula Vannod	2:19.25
2024	Halfday	Maxime Guyon	Carlos Laffon-Parias	Wertheimer et Frère	2:26.68
2025	Zia Agnese	Ronan Thomas	Gianluca Bietolini	Mme G D'amato/r Marini	2:17.63
2026	Gilded Prize	Colin Keane	Francis-Henri Graffard	Juddmonte	2:19.37

== Earlier winners ==
- 1952: Marche Lorraine
- 1953: Banassa
- 1954: Marijuana
- 1955: Mahina
- 1956: Djelfina
- 1957: Cerisoles
- 1958: Danoise
- 1959: Azulene
- 1960: Marella
- 1961: Carpe Diem
- 1962: Lady Dissenter
- 1963: Doronic
- 1964: Res
- 1965: Ma
- 1966: Alphee
- 1967: Dourdan
- 1968: Hugger Mugger
- 1969: Lastarria
- 1970: Peronelle
- 1971: Insolite
- 1972: Licata
- 1973: Passiova
- 1974: Tropical Cream
- 1975: Feuille Morte
- 1976: Pawneese
- 1977: Guile Princess
- 1978: Abalvina

== See also ==
- List of French flat horse races
