= Dalakhani =

Irish-bred Thoroughbred racehorse (2000–2021)

- Racing silks of Aga Khan
- Sire: Darshaan
- Grandsire: Shirley Heights
- Dam: Daltawa
- Damsire: Miswaki
- Sex: Stallion
- Foaled: 16 February 2000
- Died: 15 January 2021
- Country: Ireland
- Colour: Grey
- Breeder: HH Aga Khan IV
- Owner: HH Aga Khan IV
- Trainer: Alain de Royer-Dupré
- Record: 9: 8-1-0
- Earnings: US$2,505,203

Major wins
- Prix des Chênes (2002); Critérium International (2002); Prix Lupin (2003); Prix Greffulhe (2003); Prix Niel (2003); Prix du Jockey Club (2003); Prix de l'Arc de Triomphe (2003)

Awards
- European Three-Yr-Old Champion Colt (2003); European Horse of the Year (2003); Timeform rating: 133
- Last updated on 5 October 2025

Dalakhani (16 February 2000 – 15 January 2021) was an Irish-bred, French-trained thoroughbred racehorse. He was owned and bred by Aga Khan IV and trained by Alain de Royer-Dupré, and won the Prix du Jockey Club and the Prix de l'Arc de Triomphe in 2003.

Dalakhani won the Critérium International as a 2-year old, and the Prix Lupin, Prix du Jockey Club, and Prix de l'Arc de Triomphe as a 3-year old. He was beaten by half a length in the Irish Derby by another Aga Khan Studs horse, Alamshar, Dalakhani's only defeat in eight of nine starts. He was ridden by Christophe Soumillon in all of his races. In 2003, Dalakhani was voted European Horse of the Year.

== Background ==
Dalakhani was a "striking" grey horse bred in Ireland by the Aga Khan, who also bred both of his parents and his older half-brother, Daylami. His trainer, Alain de Royer-Dupré, called him the greatest middle-distance performer he had ever trained, and praised his "exceptional" temperament, which made him highly consistent and easy to manage, and added that his class, acceleration, and ability to act on any going made him the "complete racehorse".

His sire, Darshaan, who was also trained by Alain de Royer-Dupré, was a Prix du Jockey Club and a Critérium de Saint-Cloud winner, setting a race record time of 2:07.40 for 2,000 meters that stood for decades. Dalakhani's dam, Daltawa, who he inherited his grey coat from, also foaled his grey half-brother Daylami, who was also trained by Alain de Royer-Dupré. During his racing career Dalakhani had a dark, almost black coat, which got lighter with age especially into his retirement.

== Racing career ==
=== 2002: Two-year-old season ===
Dalakhani was undefeated in his three races as a two-year-old. He debuted on August 29 with a win in the Prix du Pré d'Auge maiden at Deauville, and an easy victory in the Prix des Chênes at Longchamp on September 22. His final race that season would be on November 2 at Saint-Cloud, winning the Critérium International by a neck over the second place horse Chevalier.

=== 2003: Three-year-old season ===
At three years old on April 20th at Longchamp, he won the Prix Greffulhe. He followed this with a dominant performance in the Prix Lupin, winning by a length over Super Célèbre, while his Aga Khan stablemate, Diyapour, finished last.

On June 6th, Dalakhani entered the Prix du Jockey Club. Facing a field that included Touch of Land, Papineau, Super Célèbre, and Diyapour, he replicated his previous success, defeating Super Célèbre by two lengths as Diyapour again finished last. Later that month, on June 27th, Dalakhani traveled outside France for the first time to contest the Irish Derby. The field included Powerscourt, Brian Boru, Napper Tandy who had previously finished fourth to Dalakhani in the Critérium International, and Alamshar, another Aga Khan owned colt trained in Ireland. In the final straight, Dalakhani and Alamshar raced in a head-to-head duel. Alamshar ultimately prevailed by a neck, while both horses finished two lengths clear of the third place finisher, Roosevelt.

Returning to France, Dalakhani raced in the Prix Niel, the trial race for the Prix de l'Arc de Triomphe. Racing against Kris Kin, Doyen, and Diyapour, he won comfortably by a length over Doyen, with Diyapour finishing at the back of the field. For his final race in the Prix de l'Arc de Triomphe, he was against a field that included High Chaparral, Doyen, Kris Kin, Bollin Eric, and Diyapour. In the final 200 meters, Mubtaker gave him a strong challenge, but Dalakhani would prevail and win by a length. High Chaparral finished third, Doyen fourth, Kris Kin eleventh, and Diyapour in last place.

== Stud career ==
In 2004, Dalakhani was standing at Gilltown Stud.

In 2008, Dalakhani's colt Conduit won the St. Leger Stakes, the third and longest leg of England's Triple Crown, as well as the Breeder's Cup Turf at Santa Anita. His progeny also include Duncan, Integral and Reliable Man.

The Aga Khan Studs made a statement in 2016 saying "The quality of this maternal line shows through in Dalakhani's talents as a sire and also as a broodmare sire, His influence is already beginning to live on through his female progeny, as Dalakhani is the broodmare sire of 20 stakes performers, including recent Epsom Derby runner-up US Army Ranger, who is a son of classic winner Moonstone."

Dalakhani was moved to Haras de Bonneval for 2016 and was retired from stud in Haras d'Ouilly, Normandy on July 2016. He died on January 15, 2021.

=== Notable progeny ===
Dalakhani has sired 10 individual Group 1 winners:

c = colt, f = filly, g = gelding

Foaled	Name	Sex	Major Wins
2005	Chinese White	f	Pretty Polly Stakes
2005	Conduit	c	Breeders' Cup Turf, St Leger Stakes, King George VI and Queen Elizabeth Stakes
2005	Duncan	c	Irish St. Leger
2005	Moonstone	f	Irish Oaks
2008	Reliable Man	c	Prix du Jockey Club, Queen Elizabeth Stakes
2008	Seismos	c	Grosser Preis von Bayern
2010	Integral	c	Sun Chariot Stakes, Falmouth Stakes
2011	Second Step	g	Grosser Preis von Berlin
2014	Defoe	g	Coronation Cup
2014	Shakeel	c	Grand Prix de Paris

== Pedigree ==
Pedigree of Dalakhani
Sire Darshaan	Shirley Heights	Mill Reef	Never Bend
Sire Darshaan	Shirley Heights	Mill Reef	Milan Mill
Sire Darshaan	Shirley Heights	Hardiemma	Hardicanute
Sire Darshaan	Shirley Heights	Hardiemma	Grand Cross
Sire Darshaan	Delsy	Abdos	Arbar
Sire Darshaan	Delsy	Abdos	Pretty Lady
Sire Darshaan	Delsy	Kelty	Venture VII
Sire Darshaan	Delsy	Kelty	Marilla
Dam Daltawa	Miswaki	Mr. Prospector	Raise a Native
Dam Daltawa	Miswaki	Mr. Prospector	Gold Digger
Dam Daltawa	Miswaki	Hopespringseternal	Buckpasser
Dam Daltawa	Miswaki	Hopespringseternal	Rose Bower
Dam Daltawa	Damana	Crystal Palace	Caro
Dam Daltawa	Damana	Crystal Palace	Hermieres
Dam Daltawa	Damana	Denia	Crepello
Dam Daltawa	Damana	Denia	Rose Ness
