= Festoon (horse) =

British-bred Thoroughbred racehorse

- Sire: Fair Trial
- Grandsire: Fairway
- Dam: Monsoon
- Damsire: Umidwar
- Sex: Mare
- Foaled: 1951
- Country: United Kingdom
- Colour: Chestnut
- Breeder: John Arthur Dewar
- Owner: John Arthur Dewar
- Trainer: Noel Cannon
- Record: 7: 3–2–1

Major wins
- 1000 Guineas (1954); Coronation Stakes (1954)

Festoon (1951–1973) was a British Thoroughbred racehorse and broodmare, best known for winning the 1000 Guineas in 1954 and setting a world record when being sold at auction later that year. In a racing career which lasted from autumn 1953 to July 1954 the filly ran seven times and won three races. After winning her only race as a two-year-old, Festoon won the Classic 1000 Guineas over one mile at Newmarket Racecourse the following spring. She failed to stay the distance in The Oaks but returned to one mile to win the Coronation Stakes at Royal Ascot and finish third against colts in the Sussex Stakes at Goodwood. She was then retired to stud where she produced several winners.

== Background ==
Festoon was a chestnut mare with a prominent white blaze and long white socks on her hind legs. She was bred by her owner John Arthur "Lucky" Dewar, an industrialist who had inherited a fortune including a string of racehorses from his uncle Thomas Dewar, 1st Baron Dewar in 1930. Festoon was sired by Fair Trial, a successful racehorse who became Britain's champion sire in 1950. Her dam, Monsoon finished second in the wartime substitute Oaks in 1943 and was bought by Dewar as a prospective broodmare for 7,300 guineas at the end of her racing career. Before foaling Festoon, Monsoon had produced Refreshed, a filly who finished third in the 1000 Guineas in 1952. As a descendant of the broodmare Rose Red, Monsoon came from the same branch of Thoroughbred "Family" 1-w which later produced Celtic Ash, Larkspur, Altesse Royale and Nocturnal Spree.

Festoon was trained throughout her brief career by Noel Cannon at the Druid's Lodge stables on Salisbury Plain, Wiltshire.

== Racing career ==
Festoon was slow to mature as a two-year-old and ran only once in 1953, winning a minor race over six furlongs.

On her first appearance as a three-year-old, Festoon finished second to Key in the 1000 Guineas Trial at Kempton Park in March. In the 1000 Guineas, Festoon started at odds of 9/2 in a field of twelve fillies, with Key being made the 5/2 favourite. Ridden by the Australian jockey Scobie Breasley she led from the start and won by two lengths from Big Berry with Welsh Fairy a length further back in third. On her next appearance, Festoon ran in the ten furlong Druid's Plate at her home course of Salisbury and was beaten by Valerullah, a colt to whom she was attempting to concede sixteen pounds. The win led some observers to conclude that Festoon had stamina limitations, especially as Fair Trial's progeny seldom excelled at distances beyond nine furlongs.

Festoon was nevertheless moved up in distance again for the Oaks over one and a half miles at Epsom. Ridden by Joe Mercer, who took over the ride after Breasley was badly injured in a fall in a race at Alexandra Park, she finished fifth to the French-trained filly Sun Cap, apparently failing to stay the distance. At Royal Ascot, Festoon returned to one mile to contest the Coronation Stakes. Ridden again by Mercer she started 11/8 favourite and won impressively from Sybil's Niece. On her final appearance, Festoon was matched against colts in the one mile Sussex Stakes at Goodwood in July. In a race run in atrocious weather she started 2/1 second favourite behind the Queen's colt Landau. Festoon challenged Landau for the lead in the straight but weakened in the closing stages and lost second place to Orthopaedic in the closing stages.

== Assessment and honours ==
In their book, A Century of Champions, based on the Timeform rating system, John Randall and Tony Morris rated Festoon an "average" winner of the 1000 Guineas.

Breasley considered Festoon one of the best horses he had ridden up to that time, comparing her to the outstanding Australian mare Tranquil Star.

== Stud record ==
On the death of John Arthur Dewar in August 1954, shortly after Festoon's last race, his bloodstock was dispersed at auction. At the Newmarket sales in December Festoon was bought by Anthony Askew for 36,000 guineas, reported as a world record price for a broodmare. As a broodmare she produced five winners, two of which were close to top class: Pindaric (sired by Pinza), won the Lingfield Derby Trial in 1962, while Atilla (sic), by Alcide, was a successful international performer whose wins included the Gran Premio del Jockey Club and the Grosser Preis von Baden. Festoon died in 1973 at the San Quentin stud.

== Pedigree ==
Pedigree of Festoon (GB), chestnut mare, 1951
Sire Fair Trial	Fairway	Phalaris	Polymelus
Sire Fair Trial	Fairway	Phalaris	Bromus
Sire Fair Trial	Fairway	Scapa Flow	Chaucer
Sire Fair Trial	Fairway	Scapa Flow	Anchora
Sire Fair Trial	Lady Juror	Son-In-Law	Dark Ronald
Sire Fair Trial	Lady Juror	Son-In-Law	Mother In Law
Sire Fair Trial	Lady Juror	Lady Josephine	Sundridge
Sire Fair Trial	Lady Juror	Lady Josephine	Americus Girl
Dam Monsoon	Umidwar	Blandford	Swynford
Dam Monsoon	Umidwar	Blandford	Blanche
Dam Monsoon	Umidwar	Uganda	Bridaine
Dam Monsoon	Umidwar	Uganda	Hush
Dam Monsoon	Heavenly Wind	Tai-Yang	Solario
Dam Monsoon	Heavenly Wind	Tai-Yang	Soubriquet
Dam Monsoon	Heavenly Wind	Godetia	Winalot
Dam Monsoon	Heavenly Wind	Godetia	Rose Red (Family: 1-w)
