= Wemyss Bight =

British-bred Thoroughbred racehorse

- Sire: Dancing Brave
- Grandsire: Lyphard
- Dam: Bahamian
- Damsire: Mill Reef
- Sex: Mare
- Foaled: 6 April 1990
- Country: United Kingdom
- Colour: Bay
- Breeder: Juddmonte Farms
- Owner: Khalid Abdullah
- Trainer: André Fabre
- Record: 9: 5-1-0
- Earnings: £261,149

Major wins
- Prix Penelope (1993); Prix Cléopâtre (1993); Prix de Malleret (1993); Irish Oaks (1993)

Wemyss Bight (6 April 1990 – 15 April 2009) was a British-bred, French-trained Thoroughbred racehorse and broodmare. She was successful in her only start as a two-year-old in 1992 and developed into a top-class middle-distance performer in the following year. She won the Prix Penelope, Prix Cléopâtre and Prix de Malleret in France before recording her biggest win in the Irish Oaks and also finished second in the Prix Vermeille. After being retired from racing she became a successful broodmare, producing the Arlington Million winner Beat Hollow. She died on 15 April 2009 at the age of 19.

== Background ==
Wemyss Bight was a bay mare with a white blaze and a white sock on her right hind leg bred in England by her owner Khalid Abdullah's Juddmonte Farms. During her racing career she was trained in France by André Fabre. She was named after a town on Eleuthera in the Bahamas.

Her sire Dancing Brave was the most highly rated British racehorse of the 1980s winning a series of major races culminating in the Prix de l'Arc de Triomphe. At stud, he was a modest success, siring the Group One winners Commander in Chief, White Muzzle, Ivanka and Cherokee Rose before being sold and exported to Japan in 1991. Wemyss Bight's dam Bahamian was a high class staying mare who won the Lingfield Oaks Trial and was placed in the Prix de l'Esperance (finished first, disqualified), Prix de Pomone and Park Hill Stakes. As a broodmare, her other descendants have included Oasis Dream, Zenda and Kingman.

== Racing career ==
=== 1992: two-year-old season ===
Wemyss Bight began her racing career in the Prix Messaline over 1800 metres on soft ground at Maisons-Laffitte Racecourse on November 6, 1992. Ridden by Thierry Jarnet she won by five lengths from the François Boutin-trained Oubava.

=== 1993: three-year-old season ===
==== Spring ====
On her three-year-old debut Wemyss Bight was matched against the Prix des Chênes winner Dancienne in the Group 3 Prix Penelope over 2100 metres at Saint-Cloud Racecourse on 16 April. Starting at odds of 2.4/1 she won by four lengths from Dancienne with a gap of six lengths back to Miss Kadrou. Four weeks later, over the same course and distance, she followed up in the Group 3 Prix Cleopatra, taking the lead in the straight and holding off the challenge of Bright Moon to win by a nose.

==== Summer ====
Wemyss Bight was then sent to England to contest the 215th running of the Oaks Stakes over one and a half miles at Epsom Racecourse on 5 June. Ridden as in the Cleopatre by Pat Eddery she was made the 11/2 third choice in the betting behind Yawl and Intrepidity (also trained by Fabre). She reached third place in the straight but looked outpaced on the good-to-firm ground in the last quarter mile and finished fifth of the fourteen runners behind Intrepidity, Royal Ballerina, Oakmead and Sueboog. Three weeks later, with Jarnet in the saddle, she started 6/5 favourite for the Group 2 Prix de Malleret over 2400 metres at Longchamp Racecourse and won by four lengths from Diamonaka.

On 10 July at the Curragh Wemyss Bight faced Intrepidity again in the Irish Oaks and started 9/2 second favourite behind her stablemate. Royal Ballerina and Oakmead were again in the field while the best fancied of the other seven runners were Takarouna (Pretty Polly Stakes) and Danse Royale (Derrinstown Stud 1,000 Guineas Trial). Racing on her favoured soft ground Wemyss Bight was restrained by Eddery in mid-division before beginning to make progress in the straight. She took the lead entering the final furlong and won by half a length from Royal Ballerina with Oakmead four and a half lengths back in third, just ahead of Intrepidity. After the race Eddery explained "I was told to hold up Wemyss Bight for a late run. At Epsom she didn't pick up at all in the straight, but I was confident that her form overall was equal to that of the favourite. This time Intrepidity had an off day and my filly left her English Oaks form behind".

==== Autumn ====
The third racecourse meeting between Wemyss Bight and Intrepidity came in the Prix Vermeille over 2400 metres at Longchamp on 12 September. Intrepidity won the race but Wemyss Bight looked an unlucky loser after being denied a clear run in the straight and then finishing strongly and failing by only a head to overhaul her rival. Wemyss Bight was strongly fancied for the 1993 Prix de l'Arc de Triomphe on 3 October, going off the 4/1 third favourite, but failed to recover after being hampered halfway through the race and trailed in 21st of the 23 runners. Intrepidity finished fourth. On her final start she was sent to California to contest the Breeders' Cup Turf at Santa Anita Park on 6 November. She started a 41/1 outsider and finished eighth of the fourteen runners behind Kotashaan.

== Breeding record ==
After her retirement from racing Wemyss Bight became a broodmare for Juddmonte Farms. She produced at least eleven foals and four winners between 1995 and 2008:

- Wemyss Quest, a bay colt (later gelded), foaled in 1995, sired by Rainbow Quest. Won six National Hunt races.
- Yaralino, bay colt, 1996, by Caerleon. Won one race.
- Beat Hollow, bay colt, 1997, by Sadler's Wells. Won seven races including Newmarket Stakes, Grand Prix de Paris, Manhattan Handicap, Turf Classic Stakes, Arlington Million.
- Biloxi, bay filly, 1998, sired by Caerleon. Unraced.
- Brightest, bay filly, 1999, by Rainbow Quest. Third in her only race.
- Court Cave, bay colt, 2001, by Sadler's Wells. Unraced.
- Bimini, bay filly, 2002, by Sadler's Wells. Unraced.
- Ancient Culture, bay colt, 2004, by Sadler's Wells. Won two races.
- Comment, bay filly, 2005, by Sadler's Wells.
- Wemyss Bay, bay filly, 2006, by Sadler's Wells. Unraced.
- Farmers Hill, chestnut colt (gelded), 2008, by Dalakhani. Failed to win in eleven races.

On 15 April 2009 Juddmonte reported that Wemyss Bight had died from "complications following foaling".

== Pedigree ==
Pedigree of Wemyss Bight (GB) bay mare 1990
Sire Dancing Brave (USA) 1983	Lyphard (USA); 1969	Northern Dancer	Nearctic
Sire Dancing Brave (USA) 1983	Lyphard (USA); 1969	Northern Dancer	Natalma
Sire Dancing Brave (USA) 1983	Lyphard (USA); 1969	Goofed	Court Martial
Sire Dancing Brave (USA) 1983	Lyphard (USA); 1969	Goofed	Barra
Sire Dancing Brave (USA) 1983	Navajo Princess (USA); 1974	Drone	Sir Gaylord
Sire Dancing Brave (USA) 1983	Navajo Princess (USA); 1974	Drone	Cap and Bells
Sire Dancing Brave (USA) 1983	Navajo Princess (USA); 1974	Olmec	Pago Pago
Sire Dancing Brave (USA) 1983	Navajo Princess (USA); 1974	Olmec	Chocolate Beau
Dam Bahamian (IRE) 1985	Mill Reef (USA); 1968	Never Bend	Nasrullah
Dam Bahamian (IRE) 1985	Mill Reef (USA); 1968	Never Bend	Lalun
Dam Bahamian (IRE) 1985	Mill Reef (USA); 1968	Milan Mill	Princequillo
Dam Bahamian (IRE) 1985	Mill Reef (USA); 1968	Milan Mill	Virginia Water
Dam Bahamian (IRE) 1985	Sorbus (IRE); 1975	Busted	Crepello
Dam Bahamian (IRE) 1985	Sorbus (IRE); 1975	Busted	Sans Le Sou
Dam Bahamian (IRE) 1985	Sorbus (IRE); 1975	Censorship	Prince John
Dam Bahamian (IRE) 1985	Sorbus (IRE); 1975	Censorship	Sixpence (Family 19)
