= 2003 Prix de l'Arc de Triomphe =

- Location: Longchamp Racecourse
- Date: October 5, 2003
- Winning horse: Dalakhani

The 2003 Prix de l'Arc de Triomphe was a horse race held at Longchamp on Sunday 5 October 2003. It was the 82nd running of the Prix de l'Arc de Triomphe.

The winner was Dalakhani, a three-year-old colt trained in France by Alain de Royer-Dupré. The winning jockey was Christophe Soumillon.

== Race details ==
- Sponsor: Groupe Lucien Barrière
- Purse: €1,600,000; First prize: €914,240
- Going: Holding
- Distance: 2,400 metres
- Number of runners: 13
- Winner's time: 2m 32.3s

== Full result ==
Pos.	Marg.	Horse	Age	Jockey	Trainer (Country)
1		Dalakhani	3	Christophe Soumillon	Alain de Royer-Dupré (FR)
2	¾	Mubtaker	6	Richard Hills	Marcus Tregoning (GB)
3	5	High Chaparral	4	Michael Kinane	Aidan O'Brien (IRE)
4	1½	Doyen	3	Frankie Dettori	André Fabre (FR)
5	1½	Vinnie Roe	5	Pat Smullen	Dermot Weld (IRE)
6	1½	Black Sam Bellamy	4	Jamie Spencer	Aidan O'Brien (IRE)
7	nk	Dai Jin	3	Olivier Peslier	Andreas Schütz (GER)
8	3	Bollin Eric	4	Kevin Darley	Tim Easterby (GB)
9	3	Ange Gabriel	5	Thierry Jarnet	Eric Libaud (FR)
10	8	Policy Maker	3	Dominique Boeuf	Élie Lellouche (FR)
11	20	Kris Kin	3	Kieren Fallon	Sir Michael Stoute (GB)
12	1	First Charter	4	Brett Doyle	Sir Michael Stoute (GB)
13	20	Diyapour	3	Thierry Gillet	Alain de Royer-Dupré (FR)

- Abbreviation: nk = neck

== Winner's details ==
Further details of the winner, Dalakhani.

- Sex: Colt
- Foaled: 16 February 2000
- Country: Ireland
- Sire: Darshaan; Dam: Daltawa (Miswaki)
- Owner / Breeder: HH Aga Khan IV
