= Anthony Crastus =

French horse racing jockey

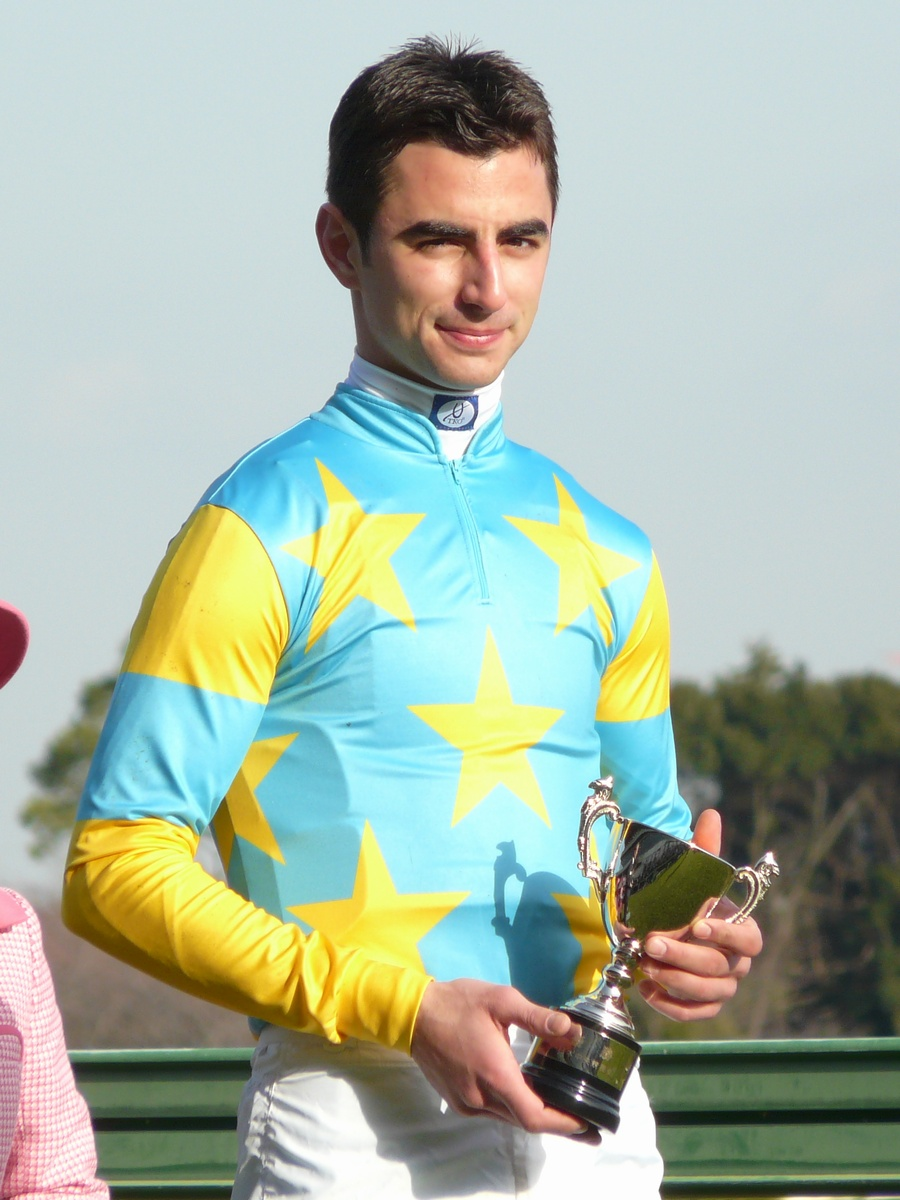
- Anthony Crastus at Nakayama Racecourse

Personal information
- Born: 7 April 1985 (age 41) Paris, France
- Occupation: Jockey
- Height: 168 cm (5 ft 6 in)
- Weight: 50 kg (110 lb)
- Spouse: Julie Sellier (m. 2018)

Horse racing career
- Sport: Horse racing
- Career wins: ca. 900

Significant horses
- Planteur

Anthony Crastus (born 7 April 1985, in Paris) is a French horse racing jockey. He competes in flat racing mainly in France, having won several group races there, but has also ridden and won in the United States, Germany, Japan, India and Switzerland during his career. Crastus used to be the retained rider for Wildenstein Stables, riding horses trained by Élie Lellouche such as Planteur. His best position in French flat racing championships was 7th in 2018 with 87 race wins, the most for a single season in his career. He has won over 900 races worldwide.

His father Antoine was a harness racing jockey.
