= Saint-Cloud Racecourse =

Race course in Saint-Cloud, France

Coordinates: 48°51′25″N 2°12′10″E

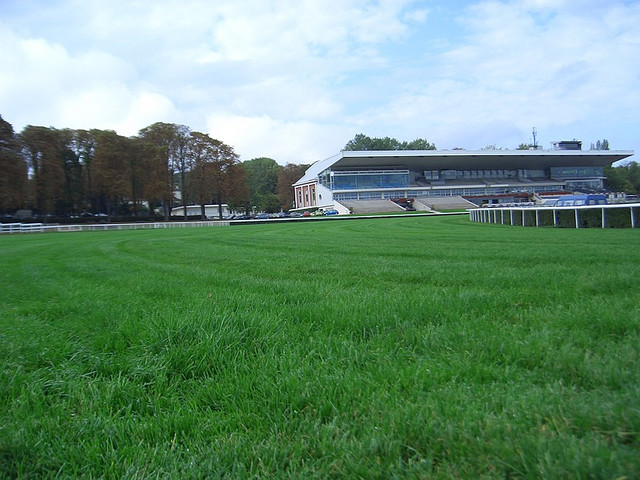
Saint-Cloud Racecourse in 2006

Hippodrome de Saint-Cloud is a grass race course for Thoroughbred flat horse racing opened in 1901 at 1 rue du Camp Canadien in Saint-Cloud near Paris, France. During World War 1, the race course site housed the No. 4 Canadian Stationary Hospital operated by the Canadian Army Medical Corp. On July 8, 1916 the No. 4 CSH was elevated to the No. 8 Canadian General Hospital and operated until decommissioned in 1919. The facilities were built by politician and Thoroughbred owner/breeder Edmond Blanc (1856–1920) in whose honor the Prix Edmond Blanc was established in 1921.

The venue was used for some of the polo events for the 1924 Summer Olympics.

The Hippodrome de Saint-Cloud is host to a number of important races including the Group One Grand Prix de Saint-Cloud held at the end of June/first week of July each year, and the Critérium de Saint-Cloud run each November.

In 1992, the government declared Hippodrome de Saint-Cloud an official Monument historique.
