= Mister Majestic (horse) =

Irish-bred Thoroughbred racehorse

- Sire: Tumble Wind
- Grandsire: Restless Wind
- Dam: Our Village
- Damsire: Ballymore
- Sex: Stallion
- Foaled: 2 February 1984
- Country: Ireland
- Colour: Bay
- Breeder: Eimear Haughey
- Owner: David Johnson
- Trainer: Robert Williams
- Record: 17: 7-1-0

Major wins
- Middle Park Stakes (1986); Leisure Stakes (1987)

Awards
- Timeform rating 122 (1986), 112 (1987)

Mister Majestic (2 February 1984 – after 1999) was an Irish-bred British-trained thoroughbred racehorse and sire. He was a specialist sprinter who showed his best form as a two-year-old in 1986. After winning four minor races in the early part of the year, he returned in the autumn to record a 33/1 upset win in the Group One Middle Park Stakes. In the following year, he won two races, including the Leisure Stakes, from seven starts before being retired from racing. He stood as a breeding stallion in Ireland and Italy but had little success as a sire of winners.

== Background ==
Mister Majestic was a "strong, good-bodied" bay horse with no white markings bred at the Abbeville Stud in County Meath, Ireland by Eimear Haughey. He was sired by the American stallion Tumble Wind, whose wins included the Hollywood Derby and the San Luis Obispo Handicap. Tumble Wind spent much of his stud career in Europe, where his other winners included Drumalis (Premio Parioli), Horage (St James's Palace Stakes), Lugana Beach (Duke of York Stakes) and Tumbledownwind (Gimcrack Stakes). Mister Majestic's dam, Our Village, showed no ability as a racehorse but did much better as a broodmare, producing the Grand Prix de Paris winner Homme de Loi. She was a great-granddaughter of the British broodmare whose other descendants have included Levmoss, Le Moss and Nikoli.

As a foal, at the end of 1984, Mister Majestic was put up for auction and was sold for 11,000 Irish guineas. In the following year, he returned to the sales ring and was bought for 26,000 Irish guineas by the bloodstock agent John Warren on behalf of British financier David Johnson. The colt was sent into training with Robert Williams at the Marriott Stables, Newmarket, Suffolk.

== Racing career ==
=== 1986: two-year-old season ===
Mister Majestic made a successful racecourse debut by beating three a maiden race over five furlongs at Newmarket Racecourse in April. In the next six weeks, he ran four times, finishing 2nd over five furlongs and then winning minor races at Beverley and Kempton before returning to Beverley to win impressively by six lengths in May. In June, he was moved up in class as he was sent to Royal Ascot to contest the Chesham Stakes and finished 4th behind the filly Minstrella. After a break of more than three months, Mister Majestic was sent to race in Germany where he finished 4th in the Zukunfts-Rennen, before returning to England for the Mill Reef Stakes at Newbury Racecourse, later in September. After entering the starting stalls, he reared up and was withdrawn from the race, but as the runners had already come under the starter's orders he was deemed to have competed and finished last.

On 4 October, Mister Majestic was moved up to Group One level and started a 33/1 outsider in a seven-runner field for the Middle Park Stakes over six furlongs at Newmarket. The undefeated Most Welcome was made favourite ahead of Mansooj (winner of the July Stakes), Risk Me (National Stakes), and Gehghhiz, whilst the other two outsiders were Crofter's Cline and Whippet. Ridden by Ray Cochrane, Mister Majestic was among the leaders from the start and took an advantage of one length just inside the last quarter mile. He fought off several challenges from Risk Me and Genghiz in the closing stages and won by a head and a neck, with Mansooj half a length away in 4th. On his final appearance of the year, Mister Majestic was stepped up in distance for the Dewhurst Stakes over seven furlong at the same course two weeks later. He led for most of the way but faded in the final furlong to finish 4th behind Ajdal, Shady Heights and Genghiz.

=== 1987: three-year-old season ===
Mister Majestic began his three-year-old season by winning a minor race over six furlongs at Folkestone Racecourse in April and finished 4th over the same distance on his next start. In May, he produced his best effort of the season in the Listed Leisure Stakes at Lingfield Park as he won by a short head from the four-year-old Governor General (Abernant Stakes) with Singing Steven (Cornwallis Stakes) in third place. He then finished 7th to Ajdal in the July Cup and 4th to Cricket Ball in the Prix de Meautry; he was disqualified in the latter for carrying an incorrect weight. In his two remaining races, he finished last of eight behind Ajdal in the Vernons Sprint Cup and unplaced behind Dowsing in the Diadem Stakes.

== Assessment ==
In the official International Classification for the European two-year-olds of 1986, Mister Majestic was rated the 5th best colt in Europe, eight pounds behind the top-rated Reference Point. The independent Timeform organisation gave him a rating of 122, ten pounds inferior to Reference Point who was their best two-year-old. In their annual Racehorses of 1986, Timeform described him as "a typical sprinter" who was unlikely to stay further than seven furlongs. He was given a Timeform rating of 112 in 1987.

== Stud record ==
Mister Majestic was retired at the end of his three-year-old season and became a breeding stallion at the Dowdstown House Stud in County Kildare. He later moved to Italy where his last recorded foals were born in 2000. He sired some minor winners both on the flat and under National Hunt rules, but no top-class performers.

== Pedigree ==
Pedigree of Mister Majestic (IRE), bay stallion, 1984
| Sire Tumble Wind (USA) 1964 | Restless Wind (USA); 1956 | Windy City | Wyndham |
| Sire Tumble Wind (USA) 1964 | Restless Wind (USA); 1956 | Windy City | Staunton |
| Sire Tumble Wind (USA) 1964 | Restless Wind (USA); 1956 | Lump Sugar | Bull Lea |
| Sire Tumble Wind (USA) 1964 | Restless Wind (USA); 1956 | Lump Sugar | Sugar Run |
| Sire Tumble Wind (USA) 1964 | Easy Stages (USA); 1953 | Endeavour | British Empire |
| Sire Tumble Wind (USA) 1964 | Easy Stages (USA); 1953 | Endeavour | Himalaya |
| Sire Tumble Wind (USA) 1964 | Easy Stages (USA); 1953 | Saturday Off | Kiev |
| Sire Tumble Wind (USA) 1964 | Easy Stages (USA); 1953 | Saturday Off | Mexican Tea |
| Dam Our Village (IRE) 1976 | Ballymore (IRE); 1969 | Ragusa | Ribot |
| Dam Our Village (IRE) 1976 | Ballymore (IRE); 1969 | Ragusa | Fantan |
| Dam Our Village (IRE) 1976 | Ballymore (IRE); 1969 | Paddy's Sister | Ballyogan |
| Dam Our Village (IRE) 1976 | Ballymore (IRE); 1969 | Paddy's Sister | Birthday Wood |
| Dam Our Village (IRE) 1976 | Epona (IRE); 1969 | Le Levanstell | Le Lavandou |
| Dam Our Village (IRE) 1976 | Epona (IRE); 1969 | Le Levanstell | Stella's Sister |
| Dam Our Village (IRE) 1976 | Epona (IRE); 1969 | Astridama | Panorama |
| Dam Our Village (IRE) 1976 | Epona (IRE); 1969 | Astridama | Astrid (Family:1-k) |
