= Shady Heights =

British Thoroughbred racehorse

- Sire: Shirley Heights
- Grandsire: Mill Reef
- Dam: Vaguely
- Damsire: Bold Lad (IRE)
- Sex: Stallion
- Foaled: 17 May 1984
- Country: United Kingdom
- Colour: Bay
- Breeder: Floors Farming
- Owner: George Tong; Hideto Furuoka
- Trainer: Robert Armstrong
- Record: 29: 7-7-4

Major wins
- Easter Stakes (1987); Breeders' Cup Prep Mile (1987); Marshall Stakes (1987); Tattersalls Rogers Gold Cup (1988); Bayerisches Zuchtrennen (1988); International Stakes (1988)

Shady Heights (12 May 1984 – ca. 1997) was a British Thoroughbred racehorse. In four seasons on the racecourse he competed in Britain, Ireland, France, Germany, Japan and the United States, winning seven of his twenty-nine contests.

He showed great promise as a juvenile in 1986, winning on his debut and then finishing second in both the Mill Reef Stakes and the Dewhurst Stakes. In the following year he took the Easter Stakes in April and was briefly made favourite for The Derby but did not score again until late autumn when he won both the Breeders' Cup Prep Mile and the Marshall Stakes. Shady Heights reached his peak as a four-year-old in 1988 when he won the Tattersalls Rogers Gold Cup in Ireland and the Bayerisches Zuchtrennen in Germany before being awarded the Group One International Stakes on the disqualification of Persian Heights. He also finished second in both the Eclipse Stakes and the Phoenix Champion Stakes.

He failed to win in five races in 1989 and was retired from racing to become a breeding stallion in Japan. He had little success as a sire of winners.

== Background ==
Shady Heights was a "lengthy, angular" bay horse with no white Markings bred by the Duke of Roxburghe at his stud at Floors Castle, near Kelso, Scotland. He was from the fifth crop of foals sired by Shirley Heights who won The Derby and the Irish Derby in 1978. He became a very successful breeding stallion who sired many good winners including Slip Anchor and Darshaan. Shady Heights' dam Vaguely won two minor races from twelve starts in Britain in 1976 and 1977. She was a granddaughter of the broodmare Tantalizer, who also produced the St Leger winner Provoke.

As a yearling Shady Heights was offered at the Highflyer Sales and was bought for 110,000 guineas by a representative of George Tong. He was sent into training with Robert Armstrong at his St Gatien Stable in Newmarket, Suffolk.

== Racing career ==
=== 1986: two-year-old season ===
Shady Heights made a successful racecourse debut in a six furlong race at Windsor Racecourse in September, coming from well off the pace to win impressively. The colt was immediately stepped up in class for the Group Two Mill Reef Stakes over the same distance at Newbury Racecourse later that month and started the 7/2 second favourite behind the outstanding filly Forest Flower. Ridden by the American jockey Steve Cauthen he was briefly outpaced when the filly accelerated two furlongs out before staying on to finish second, beaten half a length. He was five lengths clear of the other runners, who included the subsequent Middle Park Stakes winner Mister Majestic. Cauthen was again in the saddle when Shady Heights contested Britain's most prestigious race for two-year-olds, the Dewhurst Stakes over seven furlongs at Newmarket Racecourse on 17 October. He again finished strongly and finished second, beaten three quarters of a length by Ajdal. Plans to run the colt in the Breeders' Cup Juvenile were abandoned as he was prepared for a three-year-old campaign.

=== 1987: three-year-old season ===
Shady Heights began his second season in the Easter Stakes over one mile at Kempton Park Racecourse and won impressively by four lengths from the Prix Thomas Bryon winner Glory Forever. After the race he was made ante-post favourite for the 1987 Epsom Derby. In May he contested recognised trials for the Derby and failed to maintain his position at the head of the market finishing second to Sir Harry Lewis in the Dee Stakes at Chester and fourth to Ibn Bey in the Predominate Stakes at Goodwood.

After a three-month break, Shady Heights returned to the track and was matched against older horses for the first time in the Group One International Stakes at York Racecourse on 18 August. He made little impact as he finished ninth of the ten runners behind Triptych. He was then dropped in class and was beaten by Lockton in the Strensall Stakes at York in September before being sent to France to finish third behind Waajib in the Prix du Rond Point at Longchamp Racecourse on 4 October. He returned to England to run third behind the filly Asteroid Field in the Supreme Stakes at Goodwood before being sent to Doncaster for the Listed Breeders' Cup Prep Mile. He scored his first win since April as he won by four lengths from the Kentucky Derby runner-up Bold Arrangement. He ended his season in the Marshall Stakes (later renamed the Ben Marshall Stakes) at Newmarket and won by one and a half lengths from the filly Azyaa.

=== 1988: four-year-old season ===
Shady Heights was highly tried as a four-year-old, running twelve times in eight months between March and November. In early spring he finished fourth to Rose Or No in the Prix Edmond Blanc at Saint-Cloud Racecourse, third to Media Starguest in the Earl of Sefton Stakes and second to Soviet Star in the Sandown Mile. In May he was shipped to Ireland for the Tattersalls Rogers Gold Cup (then a Group Two race) over ten furlongs at the Curragh and started the 7/4 favourite against nine opponents. Ridden by the South African jockey Michael Roberts he won by half a length from the Vincent O'Brien-trained Fair Judgement. In the Prix d'Ispahan on soft ground at Longchamp two weeks later he finished fifth of the six runners behind Miesque.

At Sandown Park Racecourse on 2 July Shady Heights started a 33/1 outsider for the Eclipse Stakes. Ridden by Tony Ives he produced one of his best performances a he led for most of the way before being overtaken in the final strides and beaten a neck by Mtoto in what was described as a "knock-down drag-out affair". The leading racemares Triptych and Indian Skimmer came home in third and fourth places. Four weeks later he was sent to Germany for the Bayerisches Zuchtrennen in Munich and won by four lengths from the Preis der Diana winner Alte Zeit. On 16 August Shady Heights made his second attempt to win the International Stakes in which he was ridden by Willie Carson. The three-year-old Kefaah started favourite ahead of Persian Heights with Shady Heights joint-third choice in the betting on 7/2 alongside Indian Skimmer. The other two runners were the French challenger Fijar Tango (Grand Prix de Paris) and Lapierre (Prix Jean Prat). Carson settled Shady Heights just behind the leaders and turned into the straight in third place behind Kefaah and Fijar Tango before beginning to make progress on the inside in the last quarter mile. Meanwhile, Persian Heights launched a challenge on the outside but hung to the left, hampering Indian Skimmer before taking the lead a furlong out. Persian Heights crossed the line one and a half lengths in front of Shady Heights with Indian Skimmer a neck away in third. Indian Skimmer's jockey, Steve Cauthen lodged an objection to the winner and the racecourse stewards decided that the interference at the furlong marker had cost the mare second place. Under the rules of racing at the time Persian Heights was relegated to third (behind the horse who had suffered from the interference) and Shady Heights was awarded the victory.

Shady Heights' best subsequent run in 1988 came in the Phoenix Champion Stakes at Phoenix Park Racecourse on 4 September when he disputed the lead for most of the way before being beaten three quarters of a length by Indian Skimmer with Triptych and Persian Heights in third and fourth. He appeared to have been hampered by the winner in the closing stages but on this occasion the inquiry by the racecourse stewards left the result unchanged. Later that month he was sent to Germany for a second time and finished unplaced behind Kondor in the Preis von Europa. He was back in England for the Champion Stakes at Newmarket in October and finished fourth behind Indian Skimmer, Persian Heights and Doyoun. After the race he was acquired by Hideto Furuoka and sent to Japan to contest the 2400 metre Japan Cup at Tokyo Racecourse on 27 November. He made no impact and finished unplaced behind the American four-year-old Pay the Butler.

=== 1989: five-year-old season ===
Despite his change of ownership Shady Height remained in training with Armstrong as a five-year-old in 1989. In April he finished fifth in the Earl of Sefton Stakes and fifth behind Indian Skimmer in the Gordon Richards Stakes. After a break of almost four months he made his third and final appearance in the International Stakes and produced his best performance of the season as he finished third behind Ile de Chypre and Cacoethes at odds of 20/1. The horse was sent to the United States to contest the Arlington Million on 3 September and finished unplaced behind Steinlen. On his final racecourse appearance Shady Heights finished fifth behind Creator in the Prix Dollar at Longchamp on 7 October.

== Assessment ==
In the official International Classification for 1986, Shady Heights was rated the third-best two-year-old colt in Europe behind Reference Point and Ajdal. The independent Timeform organisation gave Shady Heights a rating of 125, seven pounds behind their best two-year-old Reference Point. In their annual Racehorses of 1986 they described him as "a genuine classic colt". In 1987 he was rated 120 by Timeform who commented that his performances in late autumn had "restored his somewhat tarnished reputation".

== Stud record ==
At the end of his racing career Shady Heights was exported to become a breeding stallion in Japan. In eight seasons at stud he sired 116 winners of 335 races but had no top class performers. He was however, the damsire of the Kikuka Sho winner Hishi Miracle. His last covering season was 1997.

== Pedigree ==
Pedigree of Shady Heights, bay stallion, 1984
Sire Shirley Heights (GB) 1975	Mill Reef(USA); 1968	Never Bend	Nasrullah
Sire Shirley Heights (GB) 1975	Mill Reef(USA); 1968	Never Bend	Lalun
Sire Shirley Heights (GB) 1975	Mill Reef(USA); 1968	Milan Mill	Princequillo
Sire Shirley Heights (GB) 1975	Mill Reef(USA); 1968	Milan Mill	Virginia Water
Sire Shirley Heights (GB) 1975	Hardiemma (GB); 1969	Hardicanute	Hard Ridden
Sire Shirley Heights (GB) 1975	Hardiemma (GB); 1969	Hardicanute	Harvest Maid
Sire Shirley Heights (GB) 1975	Hardiemma (GB); 1969	Grand Cross	Grandmaster
Sire Shirley Heights (GB) 1975	Hardiemma (GB); 1969	Grand Cross	Blue Cross
Dam Vaguely (GB) 1974	Bold Lad (IRE); 1964	Bold Ruler	Nasrullah
Dam Vaguely (GB) 1974	Bold Lad (IRE); 1964	Bold Ruler	Miss Disco
Dam Vaguely (GB) 1974	Bold Lad (IRE); 1964	Barn Pride	Democratic
Dam Vaguely (GB) 1974	Bold Lad (IRE); 1964	Barn Pride	Fair Alycia
Dam Vaguely (GB) 1974	Vaguely Mine (GB); 1969	Silly Season	Tom Fool
Dam Vaguely (GB) 1974	Vaguely Mine (GB); 1969	Silly Season	Double Deal
Dam Vaguely (GB) 1974	Vaguely Mine (GB); 1969	Tantalizer	Tantieme
Dam Vaguely (GB) 1974	Vaguely Mine (GB); 1969	Tantalizer	Indian Night (Family 1-n)

- Shady Heights was inbred 4 × 4 to Nasrullah, meaning that this stallion appears twice in the fourth generation of his pedigree.
