= Ajdal =

American-bred Thoroughbred racehorse

- Sire: Northern Dancer
- Grandsire: Nearctic
- Dam: Native Partner
- Damsire: Raise a Native
- Sex: Colt
- Foaled: 2 April 1984
- Country: United States
- Colour: Bay
- Breeder: Ralph C. Wilson Jr.
- Owner: Sheikh Mohammed
- Trainer: Michael Stoute
- Record: 11:7-0-1

Major wins
- Dewhurst Stakes (1986); Craven Stakes (1987); July Cup (1987); William Hill Sprint Championship (1987); Vernons Sprint Cup (1987)

Awards
- Top-rated European Sprinter (1987); Timeform Best Sprinter (1987); Timeform rating: 130 in 1986 and 1987

Ajdal (2 April 1984 – 19 August 1988) was an American-bred, British-trained Thoroughbred racehorse and sire. He was one of the leading European two-year-old of 1986, when he was unbeaten in three races including the Dewhurst Stakes. In the early part of 1987 he was aimed at the classics but after winning the Craven Stakes on his debut, he was beaten in the 2000 Guineas, Irish 2,000 Guineas and Epsom Derby. He was then switched to shorter distances and emerged as the best European sprinter of the year, winning the July Cup, William Hill Sprint Championship and Vernons Sprint Cup.

== Background ==
Ajdal was a bay colt with three white socks bred in Maryland by Ralph C. Wilson Jr. He was from the nineteenth crop of foals sired by Northern Dancer, the winner of the 1964 Kentucky Derby and one of the most influential sires of the 20th century. Ajdal's dam Native Partner was a half sister of Jim French and a top-class racemare whose wins included the Maskette Handicap in 1970. Apart from Ajdal she produced several other winners including (Formidable), Flying Partner (Fantasy Stakes) and Fabuleux Jane (Prix de Pomone).

The yearling was consigned by Wilson's Oxford Stable to the Keeneland Sales in July 1985 and attracted strong interest. The bidding reached $7.5 million before Sheikh Mohammed dropped out when he realised that he was bidding against the colt's breeder. The price set a record for a breeder "buying back" his own horse which stood until 2008 when Michael Paulson went to $7.7 million to retain Vallenzeri, the horse later known as Take Control. The Sheikh later purchased the yearling privately for an undisclosed sum and gave him the name Ajdal, an Arabic word meaning "handsome". Ajdal was sent into training with Michael Stoute at Newmarket, Suffolk and was ridden in most of his races by Walter Swinburn.

== Racing career ==
=== 1986: two-year-old season ===
Ajdal began his racing career by winning a race over six furlongs at Doncaster Racecourse in September. Later that month he was moved up in class and distance for the Mornington Stakes over seven furlongs at Ascot Racecourse and won impressively. In October the colt was again stepped up in class to contest Britain's most prestigious race for two-year-olds, the Group One Dewhurst Stakes at Newmarket. Despite never having run in a Group race, Ajdal was made the 4/9 favourite against four opponents which included the Middle Park Stakes winner Mister Majestic (20/1). Swinburn positioned the colt just behind the leaders before taking the lead a furlong from the finish. Ajdal quickly accelerated clear of the field and seemed poised to win easily, but in the final strides he began to slow down and won by only three-quarters of a length from Shady Heights. Some observers felt that Ajdal was tiring in the closing stages, while others, including Timeform, felt that the colt was merely showing sign of inexperience. He looked likely to be named the year's leading two-year-old but his performance was surpassed eight days later when Reference Point won the William Hill Futurity.

=== 1987: three-year-old season ===
Ajdal began his three-year-old season as favourite for the 2000 Guineas and made his first appearance in the Craven Stakes over the Rowley Mile at Newmarket on 16 April. He started the 6/5 favourite and won by three-quarters of a length from the Richard Hannon Sr.-trained Don't Forget Me with Most Welcome in third place. Sixteen days later, over the same course and distance, Ajdal started 6/5 favourite against thirteen opponents in the 181st running of the 2000 Guineas. Swinburn settled Ajdal just behind the front-running Don't Forget Me, before attempting to challenge for the lead in the last quarter mile. He was unable to overtake the leader, and after being bumped by the subsequently disqualified Most Welcome in the closing stages, he finished fifth behind Don't Forget Me, beaten two lengths. Ajdal reopposed Don't Forget Me in the Irish 2,000 Guineas at the Curragh on 16 May, with the two colts starting joint-favourites on 6/4. Ajdal finished third to his rival, but was disqualified after Swinburn failed to weigh in after the race.

On 3 June, Ajdal was moved up in distance to contest the 208th Epsom Derby over one and a half miles at Epsom Downs Racecourse. He was considered unlikely to stay the distance and started at odds of 25/1, with Swinburn opting to ride his stable companion Ascot Knight. Ridden by Ray Cochrane, Ajdal was reluctant to enter the stalls but ran prominently for much of the race before fading in the final quarter mile to finish ninth behind Reference Point. After running over one and a half mile, Ajdal was brought back to six furlongs for the Group One July Cup at Newmarket on 9 July. This required a change in the horse's training regime: after spending most of the year teaching the horse to relax and settle in a race, he now required "sharpening" to compete against specialist sprinters. He started the third favourite behind the Vincent O'Brien-trained Bluebird, who had been an impressive winner of the King's Stand Stakes at Royal Ascot. Ajdal was among the leaders from the start before taking the lead approaching the final furlong and won by a head from the filly Gayane, with Bluebird in third. Stoute later admitted that it had taken him a long time to find Ajdal's best distance and described the early part of the colt's three-year-old campaign as "one of the biggest cock-ups". In August, Ajdal raced over five furlongs for the first time when he contested the Group One William Hill Sprint Championship at York Racecourse and started 2/1 second favourite behind Bluebird. Swinburn sent the colt into the lead from the start and set a strong pace before pulling away in the last quarter mile to win by three lengths from Sizzling Melody in a time of 58.48 with Bluebird in fourth.

In September at Haydock Park Racecourse, Ajdal started 8/11 favourite for the Vernons Sprint Cup, which was the most valuable sprint race in the United Kingdom despite only carrying Group Two status. Ajdal took the lead two furlongs from the finish and won decisively by two lengths from the five-year-old Sharp Romance. Ajdal's final race was the Prix de l'Abbaye over 1000 metres at Longchamp Racecourse in October. He started the 3/10 favourite but was poorly drawn and seemed unsuited by the firm ground, finishing seventh of the nine runners behind the Irish-trained filly Polonia.

== Assessment ==
In the official International Classification for 1986, Ajdal was the second highest-rated two-year-old of the season in Europe, two pounds below Reference Point. The independent Timeform organisation concurred, rating Ajdal and Reference Point on 130 and 132 respectively. In the 1987 International Classification, Ajdal was rated on 127, making him the highest-rated sprinter and the third highest-rated three-year-old colt behind Reference Point and Trempolino. Timeform again gave him a rating of 130, and named him as the best sprinter of the year.

Stoute described Ajdal by saying that "as a sprinter he wasn't as good as Marwell, who'd be the best sprinter we had, but he beat the best around and he could have been a little better if we'd have clicked earlier what we were doing with him."

== Stud record ==
Ajdal was retired from racing to become a breeding stallion at his owner's Dalham Hall Stud in 1988 at a fee of £35,000, but was euthanized on 19 August 1988 due to a fractured hind leg at the age of four. In the following year thirty-five of the mares he had covered produced live foals. The performances of his offspring on the racecourse were disappointing: his only winner of any consequence was Cezanne, who won the Irish Champion Stakes as five-year-old in 1994. He was more successful as a sire of broodmares, with his daughter Homage producing Mark of Esteem. Another of his daughters, Anima, was the grand-dam of the Lockinge Stakes winner Creachadoir and Youmzain, who was runner-up in three consecutive runnings of the Prix de l'Arc de Triomphe. Other Group One winners from Ajdal mares were Dilshaan (Racing Post Trophy) and Olden Times (Prix Jean Prat).

== Pedigree ==
Pedigree of Ajdal (USA), bay colt, 1984
Sire Northern Dancer (CAN) 1961	Nearctic (CAN); 1954	Nearco	Pharos
Sire Northern Dancer (CAN) 1961	Nearctic (CAN); 1954	Nearco	Nogara
Sire Northern Dancer (CAN) 1961	Nearctic (CAN); 1954	Lady Angela	Hyperion
Sire Northern Dancer (CAN) 1961	Nearctic (CAN); 1954	Lady Angela	Sister Sarah
Sire Northern Dancer (CAN) 1961	Natalma (USA); 1957	Native Dancer	Polynesian
Sire Northern Dancer (CAN) 1961	Natalma (USA); 1957	Native Dancer	Geisha
Sire Northern Dancer (CAN) 1961	Natalma (USA); 1957	Almahmoud	Mahmoud
Sire Northern Dancer (CAN) 1961	Natalma (USA); 1957	Almahmoud	Arbitrator
Dam Native Partner (USA) 1966	Raise a Native (USA); 1961	Native Dancer	Polynesian
Dam Native Partner (USA) 1966	Raise a Native (USA); 1961	Native Dancer	Geisha
Dam Native Partner (USA) 1966	Raise a Native (USA); 1961	Raise You	Case Ace
Dam Native Partner (USA) 1966	Raise a Native (USA); 1961	Raise You	Lady Glory
Dam Native Partner (USA) 1966	Dinner Partner (USA); 1959	Tom Fool	Menow
Dam Native Partner (USA) 1966	Dinner Partner (USA); 1959	Tom Fool	Gaga
Dam Native Partner (USA) 1966	Dinner Partner (USA); 1959	Bluehaze	Blue Larkspur
Dam Native Partner (USA) 1966	Dinner Partner (USA); 1959	Bluehaze	Flaming Swords (Family:7)

- Ajdal was inbred 3 x 3 to Native Dancer, meaning that this stallion appears twice in the third generation of his pedigree.
