= 1987 Epsom Derby =

- Derby
- Location: Epsom Downs Racecourse
- Date: 3 June 1987
- Winning horse: Reference Point
- Starting price: 6/4f
- Jockey: Steve Cauthen
- Trainer: Henry Cecil
- Owner: Louis Freedman

Epsom Derby 1987
1-2-3
Reference Point	Most Welcome	Bellotto

Also Ran
4-5-6
Sir Harry Lewis	Entitled	Mountain Kingdom
7-8-9
Groom Dancer	Sadjiyd	Ajdal
10-11-12
Persifleur	Legal Bid	Water Boatman
13-14-15
Romantic Prince	Love The Groom	Ibn Bey
16-17-18
Gulf King	Ascot Knight	Angara Abyss
19
Alwasmi	19 Ran	2m 33.90s

The 1987 Epsom Derby was a horse race which took place at Epsom Downs on Wednesday 3 June 1987. It was the 208th running of the Derby, and it was won by the pre-race favourite Reference Point. The winner was ridden by Steve Cauthen and trained by Henry Cecil.

== Race details ==
- Sponsor: Ever Ready
- Winner's prize money: £282,025
- Going: Good
- Number of runners: 19
- Winner's time: 2m 33.90s

== Full result ==
	*	Horse	Jockey	Trainer ^{†}	SP
1		Reference Point	Steve Cauthen	Henry Cecil	6/4 fav
2	1½	Most Welcome	Paul Eddery	Geoff Wragg	33/1
3	shd	Bellotto	Pat Eddery	Jeremy Tree	11/1
4	2	Sir Harry Lewis	John Reid	Barry Hills	66/1
5	½	Entitled	Cash Asmussen	Vincent O'Brien (IRE)	11/1
6	nk	Mountain Kingdom	Michael Roberts	Clive Brittain	33/1
7	1	Groom Dancer	Dominique Boeuf	Tony Clout (FR)	16/1
8	nk	Sadjiyd	Yves Saint-Martin	Alain de Royer-Dupré (FR)	11/2
9	1	Ajdal	Ray Cochrane	Michael Stoute	25/1
10	1½	Persifleur	Tony Cruz	Patrick Biancone (FR)	33/1
11	¾	Ascot Knight	Walter Swinburn	Michael Stoute	25/1
12	3	Love the Groom	Willie Carson	John Dunlop	33/1
13	1	Ibn Bey	Richard Quinn	Paul Cole	40/1
14	1	Legal Bid	Tony Ives	Henry Cecil	8/1
15	4	Gulf King	Paul Cook	Paul Kelleway	100/1
16	6	Water Boatman	Brian Rouse	Barry Hills	150/1
17	2½	Angara Abyss	Greville Starkey	Guy Harwood	100/1
18	5	Alwasmi	Richard Hills	Harry Thomson Jones	150/1
19	8	Romantic Prince	Willie Ryan	Chris Wall	150/1

* The distances between the horses are shown in lengths or shorter. shd = short-head; nk = neck.
† Trainers are based in Great Britain unless indicated.

== Winner's details ==
Further details of the winner, Reference Point:

- Foaled: 26 February 1984, in Great Britain
- Sire: Mill Reef; Dam: Home on the Range (Habitat)
- Owner: Louis Freedman
- Breeder: Louis Freedman
- Rating in 1987 International Classifications: 135

== Form analysis ==
=== Two-year-old races ===
Notable runs by the future Derby participants as two-year-olds in 1986.

- Reference Point – 1st Futurity Stakes
- Most Welcome – 5th Middle Park Stakes
- Bellotto – 1st Acomb Stakes
- Groom Dancer – 1st Prix Herod, 8th Prix de la Salamandre, 1st Prix de Condé, 3rd Critérium de Saint-Cloud
- Ajdal – 1st Dewhurst Stakes
- Love the Groom – 3rd Futurity Stakes
- Gulf King – 8th Chesham Stakes, 6th Prix de la Salamandre, 1st Beresford Stakes

=== The road to Epsom ===
Early-season appearances in 1987 and trial races prior to running in the Derby.

- Reference Point – 1st Dante Stakes
- Most Welcome – 3rd Craven Stakes, 13th 2,000 Guineas (finished 3rd, placed last)
- Bellotto – 3rd Greenham Stakes, 2nd 2,000 Guineas
- Sir Harry Lewis – 1st Dee Stakes
- Entitled – 2nd Irish 2,000 Guineas
- Mountain Kingdom – 3rd Easter Stakes, 2nd Lingfield Derby Trial
- Groom Dancer – 1st Prix Omnium II, 1st Prix de Guiche, 1st Prix Lupin
- Sadjiyd – 1st Prix Noailles, 1st Prix Hocquart
- Ajdal – 1st Craven Stakes, 4th 2,000 Guineas (finished 5th, placed 4th), Irish 2,000 Guineas (finished 3rd, disqualified)
- Persifleur – 1st Prix Greffulhe, 3rd Dante Stakes
- Ascot Knight – 2nd Dante Stakes
- Love the Groom – 4th Craven Stakes
- Ibn Bey – 5th Lingfield Derby Trial, 1st Predominate Stakes
- Legal Bid – 1st Feilden Stakes, 1st Lingfield Derby Trial
- Gulf King – 6th Craven Stakes, 1st Sandown Classic Trial, 5th Dante Stakes
- Water Boatman – 3rd Feilden Stakes, 6th Lingfield Derby Trial, 2nd Gallinule Stakes
- Alwasmi – 2nd Predominate Stakes
- Romantic Prince – 4th Dante Stakes

=== Subsequent Group 1 wins ===
Group 1 / Grade I victories after running in the Derby.

- Reference Point – King George VI and Queen Elizabeth Stakes (1987), St. Leger (1987)
- Sir Harry Lewis – Irish Derby (1987)
- Ajdal – July Cup (1987), William Hill Sprint Championship (1987)
- Ibn Bey – Gran Premio d'Italia (1987), Preis von Europa (1989), Deutschland-Preis (1990), Irish St. Leger (1990)

== Subsequent breeding careers ==
Leading progeny of participants in the 1987 Epsom Derby.

=== Sires of Classic winners ===
Reference Point (1st)

- Ivyanna - 1st Oaks d'Italia (1992) - Dam of Snowflake (2nd Nassau Stakes 2001)
- Hill of Snow - Dam of Preseli (1st Moyglare Stud Stakes 1999) and Snowfire (2nd 1000 Guineas Stakes 2002)
- Sand Reef - 2nd Prix Jean de Chaudenay (1995)
- Racing Blue - 3rd Deutsches St. Leger (1993)

Groom Dancer (7th)

- Groom Tesse - 1st Derby Italiano (2004)
- Pursuit Of Love - 3rd 2000 Guineas Stakes (1992)
- Le Balafre - 1st Prix Jean Prat (1993)
- Lord Of Men - 1st Prix de la Salamandre (1995)

Ascot Knight (11th) - Exported to Canada

- Bahamian Knight - 1st Derby Italiano (1996)
- Influent - 1st Man o' War Stakes (1997)
- Plenty Of Sugar - 2nd Coaching Club American Oaks (1994)
- Ladies' Day - Dam of He's No Pie Eater (1st Rosehill Guineas, 1st Chipping Norton Stakes 2007)

=== Sires of Group/Grade One winners ===
Most Welcome (2nd)

- Arctic Owl - 1st Irish St. Leger (2000)
- Suances - 1st Prix Jean Prat (2000)
- Star - Dam of Pastoral Pursuits and Goodricke
- Kissair - 1st Triumph Hurdle (1995)

Bellotto (3rd) - Exported to Australia

- Bullwinkle - 1st South Australian Derby (1994)
- My Brightia - 1st Crown Oaks (1996)
- Littorio - 1st The BMW (2010)
- Clang - Dam of Calaway Gal (1st Golden Slipper Stakes 2002), Clangalang (1st Australian Derby 2003) and Black Piranha (1st Stradbroke Handicap 2009,2010)

Ajdal (9th)

- Cezanne - 1st Irish Champion Stakes (1994)
- Garah - 3rd Temple Stakes 1993 - Dam of Olden Times (1st Prix Jean Prat 2001) and Festoso (3rd Cheveley Park Stakes 2007)
- Avila - Dam of Dilshaan and Darrfonah (2nd Prix Marcel Boussac 2006)
- Homage - Dam of Mark Of Esteem

=== Sires of National Hunt horses ===
Sir Harry Lewis (3rd)

- Mighty Man - 1st Long Walk Hurdle (2006)
- Diamond Harry - 1st Hennessy Gold Cup (2010)
- Harry Topper - 1st Denman Chase (2014)
- Unowhatimeanharry - 1st Champion Stayers Hurdle (2017, 2019)

=== Other Stallions ===
Love The Groom (12th) - Exported to Italy - Maktub (thrice placed in Italian Group One contests)
Ibn Bey (13th) - Exported to Japan - Damsire of Big Grass (3rd February Stakes 2007)
Entitled (5th) - Minor flat and jumps winners - Damsire of River Charm
Persifleur (10th) - Minor jumps winners in France
Sadjiyd (8th) - Exported to Saudi Arabia
Legal Bid (14th) - Exported to Canada - Exported to Germany
Alwasmi (18th) - Exported to Canada - Exported to Germany - Exported to Italy
