= Take Control =

Take Control or Taking Control may refer to:

- Take Control (horse) (2007–2013), a racehorse
- Take Control, a series of electronic books by Tidbits
- "Take Control", the slogan for the Vote Leave campaign during the 2016 United Kingdom European Union membership referendum
- Take Control (album), a 2016 album by Slaves
- Take Control, a 2006 album by State of Mind

== Songs ==
- Take Control (Amerie song), 2006
- "Take Control", a song by Old Gods of Asgard (Poets of the Fall), written for the video game Control
- "Take Control" (DJ BoBo song), 1993
- "Take Control" (Roll Deep song), 2010
- "Taking Control", a song by Aphex Twin from his 2001 album Drukqs
- "Take Control", a song by BKS
- "Take Control", a song by Culture Club from their 1982 album Kissing to Be Clever
- "Take Control", a song by Jaimeson
- "Take Control", a song by Lords of Acid from their 1991 album Lust
- "Take Control", a song by Raven from their 1983 album All for One
- "Take Control", a song by Sick of It All from their 2003 album Life on the Ropes
- "Take Control", a song by Weezer from their 2002 album Maladroit
- "Take Control", a B-side to Will Young's 2004 single "Your Game"
- "Take Control", a song by Killswitch Engage from their 2019 album Atonement
- "Take Control", a 2010 single by Julissa Veloz
- "Take Control", a song by Slayer from their 2015 album Repentless

== See also ==
- Take Care & Control, a 1998 album by Death in June
