= Leisure Stakes =

Flat horse race in Britain

Leisure Stakes
2022
| Run To Freedom | First Folio | Tabdeed |

Previous years
2021
| Dream Of Dreams | Garrus | Dubai Station |

2020-2011
2019
Dream Of Dreams | Glorious Journey | The Tin Man
2018
The Tin Man | D'bai | Projection
2017
Perfect Pasture | Dancing Star | Mr Lupton
2016
The Tin Man | Watchable | Naadirr
2015
Tropics | Lucky Kristale | Dinkum Diamond
2014
Rocky Ground | Rex Imperator | Professor
2013
Boomerang Bob | Victrix Ludorum | Mince
2012
Markab | Elnawin | Angels Will Fall
2011
Bated Breath | Triple Aspect | Libranno

2010-2001
2010
Triple Aspect | Sir Gerry | Edge Closer
2009
J J The Jet Plane | Intrepid Jack | Edge Closer
2008
Balthazaar's Gift | Lipocco | Prime Defender
2007
Assertive | Borderlescott | Something
2006
One Putra | Presto Shinko | Baltic King
2005
Baltic King | Patavellian | Celtic Mill
2004
Celtic Mill | Ashdown Express | La Cucaracha
2003
Demonstrate | Ashdown Express | Vanderlin
2002
Monkston Point | Patsy's Double | Further Outlook
2001
Harmonic Way | Tamarisk | Hot Tin Roof

2000-1991
2000
Mount Abu | Hot Tin Roof | Winning Venture
1999
Bold Fact | Tipsy Creek | Night Star
1998
Tamarisk | Arkadian Hero | World Premier
1997
Cyrano's Lad | My Best Valentine | Russian Revival
1996
Rambling Bear | Iktamal | Inzar
1995
Roger The Butler | Fard | Cool Jazz
1994
Hard To Figure | Montendre | Petersford Girl
1993
Pips Pride | Branston Abby | Son Pardo
1992
Central City | Bold Lez | Fylde Flyer
1991
Polish Patriot | Jimmy Barnie | Rami

1990-1988
1990
Sharp N' Early | Afwaj | Ra'A
1989
Restore | Green's Canaletto | Marbella Silks
1988
Gallic League | Posada | Wantage Park

The Leisure Stakes is a Listed flat horse race in Great Britain open to horses aged three years or older. It is run at Windsor over a distance of 6 furlongs and 12 yards (1,218 metres), and it is scheduled to take place each year in late May or early June.

The race was run at Lingfield Park until 2000.

== Winners ==
| Year | Winner | Age | Jockey | Trainer | Time |
|---|---|---|---|---|---|
| 1975 | Import | 4 | Joe Mercer | Bill Wightman | 1:10.61 |
| 1976 | Raffindale | 4 | Brian Taylor | Ryan Price | 1:09.01 |
| 1977 | Last Tango | 6 | Brian Rouse | John Sutcliffe | 1:11.07 |
| 1978 | Gypsy Dancer | 3 | Pat Eddery | Peter Walwyn | 1:09.59 |
| 1979 | Absalom | 4 | Taffy Thomas | Ryan Jarvis | 1:15.14 |
| 1980 | The Pug | 3 | Willie Carson | John Dunlop | 1:11.54 |
| 1981 | Runnett | 4 | Willie Carson | John Dunlop | 1:09.82 |
| 1982 | Sylvan Barbarosa | 3 | Steve Cauthen | Phillip Mitchell | 1:10.09 |
| 1983 | Solimile | 3 | Paul Cook | Paul Kellaway | 1:14.96 |
| 1984 | Habibti | 4 | Willie Carson | John Dunlop | 1:09.67 |
| 1985 | Alpine Strings | 4 | Willie Carson | Robert Armstrong | 1:10.95 |
| 1986 | Hallgate | 3 | Willie Carson | Sally Hall | 1:13.10 |
| 1987 | Mister Majestic | 3 | Tony Ives | Richard Williams | 1:09.19 |
| 1988 | Gallic League | 3 | Michael Hills | Barry Hills | 1:08.86 |
| 1989 | Restore | 6 | Greville Starkey | Geoff Lewis | 1:10.01 |
| 1990 | Sharp N' Early | 4 | Pat Eddery | Richard Hannon Sr. | 1:09.82 |
| 1991 | Polish Patriot | 3 | Ray Cochrane | Guy Harwood | 1:10.90 |
| 1992 | Central City | 3 | Willie Carson | Richard Hannon Sr. | 1:09.91 |
| 1993 | Pips Pride | 3 | Steve Raymont | Richard Hannon Sr. | 1:10.55 |
| 1994 | Hard To Figure | 8 | Alan Munro | Ron Hodges | 1:17.37 |
| 1995 | Roger The Butler | 5 | Micky Fenton | Michael Bell | 1:09.81 |
| 1996 | Rambling Bear | 3 | Ray Cochrane | Michael Blanshard | 1:08.59 |
| 1997 | Cyrano's Lad | 8 | Kieren Fallon | Chris Dwyer | 1:09.25 |
| 1998 | Tamarisk | 3 | Tim Sprake | Roger Charlton | 1:09.50 |
| 1999 | Bold Fact | 4 | Willie Ryan | Henry Cecil | 1:09.48 |
| 2000 | Mount Abu | 3 | Robert Havlin | John Gosden | 1:11.16 |
| 2001 | Harmonic Way | 6 | Steve Drowne | Roger Charlton | 1:10.50 |
| 2002 | Monkston Point | 6 | J D Smith | David Arbuthnot | 1:12.50 |
| 2003 | Demonstrate | 5 | Jimmy Fortune | John Gosden | 1:12.19 |
| 2004 | Celtic Mill | 6 | Lee Enstone | David Barker | 1:10.91 |
| 2005 | Baltic King | 5 | Jimmy Fortune | Hughie Morrison | 1:10.20 |
| 2006 | One Putra | 4 | Philip Robinson | Michael Jarvis | 1:12.52 |
| 2007 | Assertive | 4 | Richard Hughes | Richard Hannon Sr. | 1:11.66 |
| 2008 | Balthazaar's Gift | 5 | Jimmy Fortune | Luca Cumani | 1:13.91 |
| 2009 | J J The Jet Plane | 5 | Ryan Moore | Mike de Kock | 1:11.28 |
| 2010 | Triple Aspect | 4 | Liam Jones | William Haggas | 1:11.56 |
| 2011 | Bated Breath | 4 | Steve Drowne | Roger Charlton | 1:09.89 |
| 2012 | Markab | 9 | Dane O'Neill | Henry Candy | 1:10.14 |
| 2013 | Boomerang Bob | 4 | Seb Sanders | John Hills | 1:11.66 |
| 2014 | Rocky Ground | 4 | Andrea Atzeni | Roger Varian | 1:11.17 |
| 2015 | Tropics | 7 | Robert Winston | Dean Ivory | 1:09.58 |
| 2016 | The Tin Man | 4 | Tom Queally | James Fanshawe | 1:11.64 |
| 2017 | Perfect Pasture | 7 | Sean Levey | Mick Easterby | 1:10.71 |
| 2018 | The Tin Man | 6 | Tom Queally | James Fanshawe | 1:10.03 |
| 2019 | Dream of Dreams | 5 | Ryan Moore | Michael Stoute | 1:10.75 |
| | no race 2020 (Note: The 2020 running was cancelled because of the COVID-19 pandemic in the United Kingdom) |
| 2021 | Dream of Dreams | 7 | Ryan Moore | Michael Stoute | 1:14.51 |
| 2022 | Run To Freedom | 4 | David Probert | Henry Candy | 1:10.95 |

== See also ==
- Horse racing in Great Britain
- List of British flat horse races
