= Polar Falcon =

American-bred Thoroughbred racehorse

- Sire: Nureyev
- Grandsire: Northern Dancer
- Dam: Marie d'Argonne
- Damsire: Jefferson
- Sex: Stallion
- Foaled: 1 June 1987
- Country: United States
- Colour: Dark bay or brown
- Breeder: Edward A Seltzer
- Owner: Michel Zerolo; David Thompson
- Trainer: John Hammond
- Record: 14:4-2-1
- Earnings: £179,089

Major wins
- Prix Edmond Blanc (1991); Lockinge Stakes (1991); Ladbroke Sprint Cup (1991); Timeform rating: 126
- Last updated on 13 May 2026

Polar Falcon (1 June 1987 – 5 December 2001) was an American-bred, French-trained Thoroughbred racehorse and sire. Unraced as a two-year-old, he showed promising form at three while appearing to be slightly below top class. He reached his peak as a four-year-old when he won the Prix Edmond Blanc in France before taking two major prizes in England. In May he defeated the leading filly In The Groove in the Lockinge Stakes over a mile and in September he beat a strong field to win the Ladbroke Sprint Cup over six furlongs. As a breeding stallion he is best known as the sire of Pivotal. He died in 2001 at the age of fourteen.

== Background ==
Polar Falcon was a dark bay or brown horse, standing 15.2 hands high (making him rather small for a male Thoroughbred) bred in Kentucky by Edward A Seltzer. He was sired by Nureyev best known as a racehorse for being disqualified after beating Known Fact and Posse to "win" the 2000 Guineas in 1980. Apart from Polar Falcon, Nureyev was the sire of the winners of at least forty-five Group One/Grade I including Peintre Celebre, Soviet Star, Sonic Lady, Spinning World, Zilzal, Stravinsky and Miesque. His career as a stallion has been described as "outstanding". Polar Falcon's dam Marie d'Argonne showed some ability as a racehorse, winning at Saint-Cloud Racecourse in 1984 (when she was rated 104 by Timeform), and twice when sent to compete in the United States in 1985. As a descendant of the broodmare she was a distant relative of the Prix de l'Arc de Triomphe winner Sassafras. Marie d'Argonne also produced Marie Rheinberg, the dam of the Prix du Jockey Club winner Le Havre.

As a yearling, Polar Falcon was sent to the Keeneland sales in July 1988 but was not sold as he failed to reach his reserve price of $425,000. He later entered the ownership of Michel Zerolo and was sent to race in Europe where he was sent into training with John Hammond in France.

== Racing career ==
=== 1990: three-year-old season ===
Polar Falcon was a very late foal, being born on 1 June 1987, and did not race until he was three years old. He won on his debut at Longchamp Racecourse on 8 April 1990 and then finished fourth at the same track on five weeks later. On 27 May he was moved up in class for the Group One Prix Jean Prat and finished fourth of the six runners behind Priolo. In July, he recorded his second victory when he won the Prix Pelleas over 1700 metres at Longchamp. He failed to win again in his remaining races that year, but never finished worse than fourth. He finished fourth in the Group Three Prix Quincey at Deauville Racecourse and was then campaigned in Germany where he finished third in the Elite-Preis and second in the Grosser Preis von Düsseldorf. On his final appearance of the season he returned to France and finished second in the Listed Prix du Pont du Jour at Longchamp in October. At the end of the season Polar Falcon was bought privately by David and Patricia Thompson, the owners of the Cheveley Park Stud.

=== 1991: four-year-old season ===
Polar Falcon began his four-year-old season in the Group Three Prix Edmond Blanc over 1600m on soft ground at Evry Racecourse on 1 April. Ridden by Cash Asmussen, he was towards the rear of the eleven runner field in the early stages before accelerating into the lead 200m from the finish and recorded his most important success up to that time as he beat Boxing Day easily by one and a half lengths. On 17 May, the colt was sent to England for the first time when he contested the Lockinge Stakes (then a Group Two race) at Newbury Racecourse. Ridden by the veteran Lester Piggott he started at odds of 3/1 in a four-runner field headed by the multiple Group One winning filly In The Groove, who was made the 1/2 favourite. Polar Falcon recovered from a slow start to take the lead inside the final furlong and won by two lengths from In The Groove, with the Premio Parioli winner Candy Glen in third.

In July, Polar Falcon returned to England and was brought back to sprint distances for the July Cup over six furlongs at Newmarket Racecourse. He was towards the rear of the field before making some progress in the closing stages to finish fourth of the eight runners behind Polish Patriot, Lycius and Elbio. The colt's next race was the Group One Prix Jacques Le Marois at Deauville in August. In closely contested finish he was beaten less than three quarters of a length as he took fourth place behind Hector Protector, Lycius and Danseuse du Soir.

On 7 September, Polar Falcon was ridden by Asmussen in the Group One Ladbroke Sprint Cup at Haydock Park Racecourse. He started at 13/2 in a field of six runners which also included Shadayid (1000 Guineas), Mystiko (2000 Guineas) and Sheikh Albadou (Nunthorpe Stakes). As usual, the French-trained colt was held up at the back of the field before making a challenge in the last quarter mile. After being switched to the right by Asmussen, he overtook Sheikh Albadou inside the final furlong and won in "impressive" style by one and a half lengths, with a gap of three and a half lengths back to Shadayid in third. On his final appearance he was sent to the United States to contest the Breeders' Cup Mile at Churchill Downs in November. He was the 8.9/1 fourth choice in the betting but made no impact, finishing eleventh of the fourteen runners behind Opening Verse.

== Stud record ==
Polar Falcon was retired from racing to stand at the Cheveley Park Stud in Newmarket. By far his most important offspring was Pivotal, one of his first crop of foals, who won the King's Stand Stakes and the Nunthorpe Stakes, before becoming a very successful breeding stallion, siring many major winners including Megahertz, Somnus, Peeress, Halfway to Heaven, Sariska, Izzi Top and Farhh. Polar Falcon's other progeny included the Premio Roma winners Sunstrach and Shibuni's Falcon, the Coronation Stakes winner Exclusive and the leading hurdler Intersky Falcon.

On December 5, Polar Falcon was euthanised at Rossdales and Partners' Veterinary Clinic in Newmarket following a short illness believed to be the result of a tumour in his lung. The Cheveley Park Stud's director, Chris Richardson, described him as "a kind horse with an immense character, who gave us many many magical moments both on the racecourse and through his progeny".

== Pedigree ==
Pedigree of Polar Falcon (USA), dark bay or brown stallion, 1987
Sire Nureyev (USA) 1977	Northern Dancer (CAN); 1961	Nearctic	Nearco
Sire Nureyev (USA) 1977	Northern Dancer (CAN); 1961	Nearctic	Lady Angela
Sire Nureyev (USA) 1977	Northern Dancer (CAN); 1961	Natalma	Native Dancer
Sire Nureyev (USA) 1977	Northern Dancer (CAN); 1961	Natalma	Almahmoud
Sire Nureyev (USA) 1977	Special (USA); 1969	Forli	Aristophanes
Sire Nureyev (USA) 1977	Special (USA); 1969	Forli	Trevisa
Sire Nureyev (USA) 1977	Special (USA); 1969	Thong	Nantallah
Sire Nureyev (USA) 1977	Special (USA); 1969	Thong	Rough Shod
Dam Marie d'Argonne (FR) 1981	Jefferson (GB); 1967	Charlottesville	Prince Chevalier
Dam Marie d'Argonne (FR) 1981	Jefferson (GB); 1967	Charlottesville	Noorani
Dam Marie d'Argonne (FR) 1981	Jefferson (GB); 1967	Monticella	Cranach
Dam Marie d'Argonne (FR) 1981	Jefferson (GB); 1967	Monticella	Montenica
Dam Marie d'Argonne (FR) 1981	Mohair (FR); 1974	Blue Tom	Tompion
Dam Marie d'Argonne (FR) 1981	Mohair (FR); 1974	Blue Tom	Pink Silk
Dam Marie d'Argonne (FR) 1981	Mohair (FR); 1974	Imberline	Ocarina
Dam Marie d'Argonne (FR) 1981	Mohair (FR); 1974	Imberline	Barley Corn (Family: 8-c)
