= Gayle Gal =

Irish-bred Thoroughbred racehorse

- Sire: Lord Gayle
- Grandsire: Sir Gaylord
- Dam: Best Gal
- Damsire: Bonne Noel
- Sex: Mare
- Foaled: 26 April 1983
- Country: Ireland
- Colour: Chestnut
- Breeder: Miss E. Anderson
- Owner: W A L Finnigan
- Trainer: Phil Canty
- Record: 5: 3-0-0

Major wins
- Moyglare Stud Stakes (1985)

Awards
- Timeform rating 110p (1985)

Honours
- Top-rated two-year-old filly in Ireland (1985)

Gayle Gal (26 April 1983 – after 1997) was an Irish Thoroughbred racehorse and broodmare. She produced her best form as a two-year-old in 1985, when she was unbeaten in three races including the Group 1 Moyglare Stud Stakes, and was rated the best of her age and sex in Ireland. She failed to win in 1986 and was retired from racing at the end of the year. As a broodmare he produced two minor races but no top-class performers.

== Background ==
Gayle Gal was a chestnut mare with a white blaze and a long white sock on her left hind leg, bred in Ireland by Miss E Anderson. As a yearling in 1984 she was offered for sale at Goffs and was bought for a "bargain" price of 4,200 guineas. She entered the ownership of Mr W A L Finnigan and was sent into training with Phil Canty in Ireland.

She was sired by Lord Gayle, an American-bred stallion who won the Prix Perth in 1970. Lord Gayle's other winning progeny included Blue Wind, Carroll House, Desirable, Gay Lemur (Jockey Club Stakes) and the leading hurdler Pollardstown. Gayle Gal's dam Best Girl won over nine furlongs and was a granddaughter of Garrucha, whose other descendants have included Lake Coniston.

== Racing career ==
=== 1985: two-year-old season ===
Gayle Gal began her track career in August in a minor event over six furlongs at Phoenix Park Racecourse for which she started a 20/1 outsider but upset the odds by winning from Welsh Fantasy (later to win the Gallinule Stakes) and nine others. Two weeks later the filly contested the Oldtown Stud Stakes over the same course and distance in which he faced nine rivals including Sherkraine who had finished third behind Roaring Riva and So Directed in the Phoenix Stakes. She took the lead two furlongs out and stayed on well to come home three lengths clear of Sherkraine.

On 14 September Gayle Gal, ridden by the apprentice jockey Donal Manning, was moved up in class to contest the Group 1 Moyglare Stud Stakes the Curragh and started the 5/2 favourite against fourteen opponents. The best of the other runners, according to the betting market, were Alpine Swift, Special Thanks, Gaily Gaily, Flyaway Bride, Classic Style and So Directed. With no previous Group race winners involved, the field seemed to be a sub-standard one. After tracking the front-running Flyaway Bride, Gayle Gal moved up to take the lead approaching the last quarter mile and held off the challenge of the outsider Carhue Lady to win by a length. The filly was expected to end her season with a trip to England for the Cheveley Park Stakes but was withdrawn from the race when a blood test revealed an abnormally high white cell count.

In the official International Classification of European two-year-olds for 1985, Gayle Gal was given a rating of 72, making her the best Irish-trained female, eight pounds inferior to the French-trained Baiser Vole, who was the highest-rated juvenile filly. The independent Timeform organisation awarded her a rating of 100p (the "p" indicating that she was expected to make more than usual progress), fourteen pounds behind their best two-year-old filly Femme Elite. In their annual Racehorses of 1985 Timeform commented "If she can produce the speed she possesses when raced over middle distances, she could be in for a successful time as a three-year-old".

=== 1986: three-year-old season ===
Gayle Gal remained in training as a three-year-old but failed to make any impact in two starts. The only major race she contested was the Phoenix Champion Stakes over ten furlongs at Phoenix Park on 7 September. Ridden by Manning, she started a 33/1 outsider and came home last of the thirteen runners behind Park Express.

== Breeding record ==
After the end of her racing career, Gayle became a broodmare for the Irish breeder D H W Dobson. She produced at least six foals and two winners:

- Nordic Glare, a bay colt, foaled in 1990, sired by Nordico. Failed to win in eight races.
- Eileenog, bay filly, 1991, by Kahyasi. Failed in five races.
- Celladonia, bay colt, 1992, by Green Desert. Won five races.
- Canadian Project, chestnut filly, 1993, by Project Manager. Won one race.
- Gaelic Project, bay filly, 1996, by Project Manager. Failed to win in five races.
- Palacio, chestnut colt (later gelded), 1997, by Erin's Isle. Failed to win in seventeen races.

== Pedigree ==
Pedigree of Gayle Gal (IRE), chestnut mare, 1983
Sire Lord Gayle (USA) 1965	Sir Gaylord (USA); 1959	Turn-To	Royal Charger
Sire Lord Gayle (USA) 1965	Sir Gaylord (USA); 1959	Turn-To	Source Sucree
Sire Lord Gayle (USA) 1965	Sir Gaylord (USA); 1959	Somethingroyal	Princequillo
Sire Lord Gayle (USA) 1965	Sir Gaylord (USA); 1959	Somethingroyal	Imperatrice
Sire Lord Gayle (USA) 1965	Sticky Case (GB); 1958	Court Martial	Fair Trial
Sire Lord Gayle (USA) 1965	Sticky Case (GB); 1958	Court Martial	Instantaneous
Sire Lord Gayle (USA) 1965	Sticky Case (GB); 1958	Run Honey	Hyperion
Sire Lord Gayle (USA) 1965	Sticky Case (GB); 1958	Run Honey	Honey Buzzard
Dam Best Gal (FR) 1975	Bonne Noel (GB); 1969	Santa Claus	Chamossaire
Dam Best Gal (FR) 1975	Bonne Noel (GB); 1969	Santa Claus	Aunt Clara
Dam Best Gal (FR) 1975	Bonne Noel (GB); 1969	Camilla Edge	Alcide
Dam Best Gal (FR) 1975	Bonne Noel (GB); 1969	Camilla Edge	Carrozza
Dam Best Gal (FR) 1975	Jaffatine (GB); 1967	Palestine	Fair Trial
Dam Best Gal (FR) 1975	Jaffatine (GB); 1967	Palestine	Una
Dam Best Gal (FR) 1975	Jaffatine (GB); 1967	Garrucha	Prince Taj
Dam Best Gal (FR) 1975	Jaffatine (GB); 1967	Garrucha	Gibellina (Family:5-d)
