= Polish Patriot =

American-bred Thoroughbred racehorse

- Sire: Danzig
- Grandsire: Northern Dancer
- Dam: Maria Waleska
- Damsire: Filiberto
- Sex: Stallion
- Foaled: 24 March 1988
- Country: United States
- Colour: Bay
- Breeder: Peters, Kaskel & Baker
- Owner: R A Kirstein
- Trainer: Guy Harwood
- Record: 9: 5-3-0
- Earnings: £182,961

Major wins
- Leisure Stakes (1991); Cork and Orrery Stakes (1991); July Cup (1991)

Polish Patriot (foaled 24 March 1988) was an American-bred, British-trained Thoroughbred racehorse and sire. He won two races as a two-year-old in 1990 before developing into a top-class sprinter in the following year. In 1991 he was unbeaten in three races of increasing importance, taking the Leisure Stakes, Cork and Orrery Stakes and July Cup. He was then retired from racing and stood as a breeding stallion in Ireland, Australia and Japan with modest success.

== Background ==
Polish Patriot was a bay horse with a white star and stripe and white socks on his hind feet bred in Kentucky by Peters, Kaskel & Baker. His sire Danzig, who ran only three times before his career was ended by injury, was a highly successful stallion who sired the winners of more than fifty Grade I/Group One races. His offspring include the champions Chief's Crown, Dayjur and Lure as well as the important stallion Danehill. Polish Patriot's dam Maria Waleska was a champion in Italy, winning the Oaks d'Italia and the Gran Premio d'Italia in 1979.

As a yearling in September 1989, the colt was consigned to the Keeneland sales and was bought for $375,000 by the bloodstock agent James Delahooke. He entered the ownership of Dick Kirstein and was sent to Europe and entered training with Guy Harwood at Pulborough, West Sussex. The colt was ridden in seven of his nine races by Ray Cochrane.

== Racing career ==
=== 1990: two-year-old season ===
Polish Patriot made his racecourse debut in a maiden race over six furlongs at Salisbury Racecourse on 28 June and finished second of the fifteen runners behind the John Dunlop-trained Aimaam. On 3 August the colt started 7/4 favourite for a similar event at Goodwood Racecourse and led from the start to win by three quarters of a length from Samurai Gold. Three weeks later he was matched against Timeless Times, who had won fourteen of his sixteen races, in the five furlong Nightfall Stakes at Salisbury. He took the lead from the start and opened up a clear lead at half way but was overtaken by Timeless Times in the final furlong and was beaten two lengths into second place.

At Folkestone Racecourse on 13 September Polish Patriot started favourite for a minor race over five furlongs but failed to recover from a poor start and was beaten one and a half lengths by the filly Fay's Song. At the same track eleven days later he started 1/2 favourite for a weight-for-age over six furlongs in which he was matched against four three-year-olds. He led from the start, accelerated clear of his older rivals and won "easily" eight lengths from Stone or Scissors. On his final appearance of the year, Polish Patriot was stepped up sharply in class for the Group One Middle Park Stakes over six furlongs at Newmarket Racecourse on 4 October. He started a 16/1 outsider and finished fifth of the nine runners behind the French-trained Lycius.

=== 1991: three-year-old season ===
Polish Patriot began his second season in the Listed Leisure Stakes over six furlongs at Lingfield Park Racecourse on 1 June 1991 and started a 14/1 outsider. He was among the leaders from the start, went to the front two furlongs out and drew away to win by five lengths from Jimmy Barnie with the Leicestershire Stakes winner Rami in third. At Royal Ascot later that month, the colt was one of sixteen horses to contest the Cork and Orrery Stakes (then a Group Three race) over six furlongs. He was made the 5/1 joint-favourite alongside the five-year-old Green Line Express who had won the Duke of York Stakes on his most recent start. The other runners included Chicrica (Cherry Hinton Stakes), La Grange Music (Hackwood Stakes), Inishdalla (Athasi Stakes), Cloche d'Or (Princess Margaret Stakes) and Jimmy Barnie, He was restrained by Cochrane before making progress in the last quarter mile, taking the lead in the final strides and winning by a short head from Chicarica.

On 11 July Polish Patriot was stepped up to Group One class for the July Cup at Newmarket. The King's Stand Stakes winner Elbio started favourite ahead of Lycius with Polish Patriot and Chicarica next in the betting on 6/1. The other four runners were Majlood (Sirenia Stakes), Polar Falcon, Exit To Nowhere (Prix Thomas Bryon) and Time Gentleman (Mill Reef Stakes). After tracking the leaders, Polish Patriot briefly looked unlikely to obtain a clear run, but then broke through on the inside to take the lead a furlong out. He ran on well in the closing stages to win by two lengths and half a length from Lycius and Elbio.

== Stud record ==
Polish Patriot was retired from racing to become a breeding stallion. He stood in Ireland and was also shuttled to stand in Australia for the southern hemisphere breeding season. He was exported to Japan in 1997. The most successful of his European offspring was Gothenburg whose wins included the Premio Emilio Turati, International Stakes and Meilen-Trophy. His other foals included Polaire (Pretty Polly Stakes), Osprey Ridge (Irish Cambridgeshire) and the good handicapper Ellen's Lad.

== Pedigree ==
Pedigree of Polish Patriot (USA), bay stallion, 1988
Sire Danzig (USA) 1977	Northern Dancer (CAN); 1961	Nearctic	Nearco
Sire Danzig (USA) 1977	Northern Dancer (CAN); 1961	Nearctic	Lady Angela
Sire Danzig (USA) 1977	Northern Dancer (CAN); 1961	Natalma	Native Dancer
Sire Danzig (USA) 1977	Northern Dancer (CAN); 1961	Natalma	Almahmoud
Sire Danzig (USA) 1977	Pas de Nom (USA); 1968	Admiral's Voyage	Crafty Admiral
Sire Danzig (USA) 1977	Pas de Nom (USA); 1968	Admiral's Voyage	Olympia Lou
Sire Danzig (USA) 1977	Pas de Nom (USA); 1968	Petitioner	Petition
Sire Danzig (USA) 1977	Pas de Nom (USA); 1968	Petitioner	Steady Aim
Dam Maria Waleska (IRE) 1976	Filiberto (USA); 1970	Ribot	Tenerani
Dam Maria Waleska (IRE) 1976	Filiberto (USA); 1970	Ribot	Romanella
Dam Maria Waleska (IRE) 1976	Filiberto (USA); 1970	Fast Line	Mr Busher
Dam Maria Waleska (IRE) 1976	Filiberto (USA); 1970	Fast Line	Throttle Wide
Dam Maria Waleska (IRE) 1976	Miss Protege (USA); 1970	Successor	Bold Ruler
Dam Maria Waleska (IRE) 1976	Miss Protege (USA); 1970	Successor	Misty Morn
Dam Maria Waleska (IRE) 1976	Miss Protege (USA); 1970	Belle Musique	Tudor Minstrel
Dam Maria Waleska (IRE) 1976	Miss Protege (USA); 1970	Belle Musique	Bellesoeur (Family: 2-n)
