= Lycius (horse) =

American-bred Thoroughbred racehorse

- Sire: Mr. Prospector
- Grandsire: Raise a Native
- Dam: Lypatia
- Damsire: Lyphard
- Sex: Stallion
- Foaled: 29 February 1988
- Country: United States
- Colour: Chestnut
- Breeder: John C Mabee
- Owner: Sheikh Mohammed
- Trainer: André Fabre
- Record: 11: 2-5-2
- Earnings: £263,485

Major wins
- Prix Saint Patrick (1990); Middle Park Stakes (1990)

Lycius (29 February 1988 – 24 October 2015) was an American-bred, French-trained Thoroughbred racehorse and sire. He showed excellent form as a juvenile in 1990, finishing second in the Prix de la Salamandre before traveling to England to win the Group One Middle Park Stakes. In 1991 he recorded a string of top-class performances without managing to win again: he finished second in the 2000 Guineas, July Cup and Prix Jacques Le Marois and third in the Irish 2,000 Guineas and Prix du Moulin. He was retired at the end of the year and had some success as a breeding stallion.

== Background ==
Lycius was a chestnut horse with a large, irregular white star and a long white sock on his right hind leg bred in Kentucky by John C Mabee.

He was sired by the hugely influential American stallion Mr. Prospector. Although he was best known for his success in the United States, Mr. Prospector was also the sire of numerous major winners in Europe including Kingmambo, Machiavellian, Distant View and Ravinella. Lycius's dam Lypatia showed moderate ability as a racehorse but produced several other winners including the Dixie Handicap winner Akabir. She was a great-granddaughter of the Irish broodmare Crimson (foaled 1951), whose other descendants have included Celtic Arms and Cajun.

As a yearling Lycius was consigned to the Keeneland July Yearling Sales and was bought for $500,000 by the Curragh Bloodstock Agency on behalf of Sheikh Mohammed. The colt was sent to France and was trained throughout his racing career by André Fabre.

== Racing career ==
=== 1990: two-year-old season ===
Lycius recorded his first success in July 1990 when he won the Listed Prix Saint Patrick over 1400 metres at Deauville Racecourse. The runner-up River Traffic was later sent to race in the United States where he won the Laurel Futurity. On 9 September the colt was moved up sharply in class to contest the Group One Prix de la Salamandre over 1400 metres at Longchamp Racecourse and started at odds of 3/1 in a seven-runner field headed by the undefeated Hector Protector. After turning into the straight in fifth place he made steady progress in the closing stages to finish second, one length behind Hector Protector.

On 4 October Lycius was sent to England for the Group One Middle Park Stakes over six furlongs at Newmarket Racecourse and was made the 13/8 favourite in a nine-runner field. His opponents included Distinctly North (Flying Childers Stakes) and Majlood (Sirenia Stakes), Polish Patriot and Sylva Honda (Woodcote Stakes). Ridden by Cash Asmussen, Lycius was restrained towards the rear of the field as Distinctly North set the pace, before making rapid progress approaching the final furlong. Lycius overtook Distinctly North in the final strides and won by half a length with Majlood one and a half lengths back in third.

=== 1991: three-year-old season ===
In all of his races in 1991, Lycius was partnered by Steve Cauthen. He finished second to the François Boutin-trained Ganges in the Prix Djebel at Maisons-Laffitte Racecourse on 12 April and was then sent to England to contest the classic 2000 Guineas over Newmarket's Rowley Mile on 4 May. Starting a 16/1 outsider he was restrained in the early stages towards the rear of the field before making rapid progress in the last quarter mile. He moved up alongside the leader Mystiko inside the final furlong but was unable to overtake the Clive Brittain-trained colt and was beaten a head into second place. There was a gap of six lengths back to Ganges in third, whilst the other beaten horses included Generous and Marju. Two weeks later, Lycius started favourite for the Irish 2,000 Guineas at the Curragh but was beaten into third place by the American challenger Fourstars Allstar and the locally trained Star of Gdansk.

Lycius was brought back to sprint distances for the July Cup over six furlongs at Newmarket. Starting the 11/4 second choice in the betting he finished strongly to take second place behind Polish Patriot with Elbio in third and Polar Falcon in fourth. On 11 August the colt had his first run in France since April when he contested the Prix Jacques Le Marois over 1600 metres at Deauville. The race resulted in a "blanket finish" in which Lycius produced another fast finish but was beaten a nose by Hector Protector, just ahead of Danseuse du Soir, Polar Falcon and Priolo.

In the Prix du Moulin at Longchamp Racecourse in September Lycius turned into the straight in ninth place before making good progress and finishing third behind Priolo and Mukaddamah. Danseuse du Soir and Hector Protector finished fifth and seventh respectively. On his final appearance Lycius started odds-on favourite for the Prix de La Foret over 1400 metres at Longchamp on 2 October but never looked likely to win and finished fifth of the seven runners behind Danseuse du Soir.

== Stud record ==
Lycius was retired from racing to become a breeding stallion. He initially stood in Ireland before moving to the United States in 1999. He was based at Stoneriggs Farm in Florida before relocating to Mill Creek Farm in New York State in 2002 and later moving to Briar Hill Farm, Massachusetts in 2008.

The best of his offspring included Palladio (Ohio Derby), Slap Shot (runner-up in the Prix de l'Abbaye), Hello (Gran Criterium), Shamaiel (March Stakes), Lycitus (Prix du Lys), Khasayl (Harry Rosebery Stakes), Ivan Luis (Premio Ellington) and the steeplechaser Tikram (Mildmay of Flete Challenge Cup).

== Pedigree ==
Pedigree of Lycius (USA), chestnut stallion, 1988
Sire Mr. Prospector (USA) 1970	Raise a Native (USA); 1961	Native Dancer	Polynesian
Sire Mr. Prospector (USA) 1970	Raise a Native (USA); 1961	Native Dancer	Geisha
Sire Mr. Prospector (USA) 1970	Raise a Native (USA); 1961	Raise You	Case Ace
Sire Mr. Prospector (USA) 1970	Raise a Native (USA); 1961	Raise You	Lady Glory
Sire Mr. Prospector (USA) 1970	Gold Digger (USA); 1962	Nashua	Nasrullah
Sire Mr. Prospector (USA) 1970	Gold Digger (USA); 1962	Nashua	Segula
Sire Mr. Prospector (USA) 1970	Gold Digger (USA); 1962	Sequence	Count Fleet
Sire Mr. Prospector (USA) 1970	Gold Digger (USA); 1962	Sequence	Miss Dogwood
Dam Lypatia (FR) 1975	Lyphard (USA); 1969	Northern Dancer	Nearctic
Dam Lypatia (FR) 1975	Lyphard (USA); 1969	Northern Dancer	Natalma
Dam Lypatia (FR) 1975	Lyphard (USA); 1969	Goofed	Court Martial
Dam Lypatia (FR) 1975	Lyphard (USA); 1969	Goofed	Barra
Dam Lypatia (FR) 1975	Hypatia (GB); 1968	High Hat	Hyperion
Dam Lypatia (FR) 1975	Hypatia (GB); 1968	High Hat	Madonna
Dam Lypatia (FR) 1975	Hypatia (GB); 1968	Purple Queen	Grey Sovereign
Dam Lypatia (FR) 1975	Hypatia (GB); 1968	Purple Queen	Crimson (Family: 4-i)
