= Gallic League =

British-bred Thoroughbred racehorse

- Sire: Welsh Saint
- Grandsire: St Paddy
- Dam: Red Rose Bowl
- Damsire: Dragonara Palace
- Sex: Stallion
- Foaled: 24 March 1985
- Country: United Kingdom
- Colour: Brown
- Breeder: N Abbott
- Owner: Robert Sangster
- Trainer: Barry Hills
- Record: 18: 6-2-3

Major wins
- Flying Childers Stakes (1987); Middle Park Stakes (1987); Leisure Stakes (1988); Ballyogan Stakes (1989)

Awards
- Timeform rating 119 p (1987)

Gallic League (24 March 1985 – after 1997) was a British Thoroughbred racehorse and sire. He showed his best form in the autumn of his two-year-old season but continued to run well in major sprint races for the next two years. In 1987 he won two minor races and finished third in the Norfolk Stakes before returning from a three-month absence to win the Flying Childers Stakes and then recorded his biggest win in the Middle Park Stakes. As a three-year-old he won the Leisure Stakes and finished third in the Greenham Stakes. In 1989 he took the Ballyogan Stakes and was placed in both the Duke of York Stakes and the King's Stand Stakes. After his racing career he stood as a breeding stallion in Europe and South Africa.

== Background ==
Gallic League was a brown horse with a small white star, bred in the United Kingdom by N. Abbott. He was from the penultimate crop of foals sired by the horse Welsh Saint, who recorded his biggest win in the 1970 edition of the Cork and Orrery Stakes. Gallic League's dam, Red Rose Bowl, won over seven furlongs as a two-year-old in Ireland in 1982. She was a granddaughter of Gallissa, a half-sister to Lorenzaccio.

As a foal, Gallic League was put up for auction at Newmarket and sold for 10,000 Guineas. In the following year he was returned to Newmarket for the Open Yearling Sale and was bought for 24,000 guineas by representatives of the British businessman Robert Sangster. The colt was sent into training with Barry Hills at Lambourn in Berkshire.

== Racing career ==
=== 1987: two-year-old season ===
On his racecourse debut Gallic League contested a five furlong maiden race at Newmarket Racecourse in April and finished second to the William Jarvis-trained Colmore Row. He recorded his first victory in maiden over the same distance at Bath Racecourse, taking the lead soon after the start and accelerating away from his rivals in the second half of the race. He started odds-on favourite for a minor race at Salisbury Racecourse but looked to have thrown away his chance before the start, becoming very agitated in the preliminaries and then panicking in the starting stalls. He almost unseated his jockey Greville Starkey as he attempted to break out of the stalls but went on to take the lead after a furlong and won impressively. He was then stepped up in class and started joint-favourite for the Norfolk Stakes at Royal Ascot in June. After being restrained in the early stages he made some progress in the last quarter mile but appeared unsuited by the soft ground and finished third behind Colmore Row and Classic Ruler.

Gallic League suffered from sore shins after his defeat at Ascot and did not reappear until September when he contested the Group Two Flying Childers Stakes over five furlongs at Doncaster Racecourse. Ridden for the first time by Steve Cauthen he started at odds of 5/2 after reports that he had defeated the four-year-old Handsome Sailor in a training gallop. Gallic League took the lead from the start and set a very fast pace despite a strong headwind. He drew away from his rivals in the last quarter mile and won by two and a half lengths from Tommy Daly with J Cheever Loophole in third ahead of Classic Ruler. Gallic League was then stepped up in class and distance for the Group One Middle Park Stakes over six furlongs at Newmarket Racecourse on 3 October. With Cauthen again in the saddle he was made the 6/4 favourite ahead of Rahy, Persian Heights, Digamist (winner of the Phoenix Stakes) and the 50/1 outsider Golden Garter. He took the lead from the start and soon had his opponents struggling with the exception of Rahy who looked his only real danger. Gallic League accelerated entering the final furlong and won "comfortably" by a length and a half from Rahy with a gap of four lengths back to Persian Heights in third place.

=== 1988: three-year-old season ===
Gallic League began his second season in the Greenham Stakes (a major trial race for the 2000 Guineas) over seven furlongs at Newbury on 16 April. He led for most of the way before being overtaken in the final furlong and finished third to Zelphi and Intimidate. He was thereafter kept to sprint distances. On 21 May he was made the 8/15 favourite for the Listed Leisure Stakes over six furlongs at Lingfield Park in which he was matched against older horses for the first time. Ridden by Michael Hills he led from the start and won easily by two lengths from the filly Posada. He was then made odds-on favourite for the King's Stand Stakes at Royal Ascot but finished fifth of the eight runners behind Chilibang. In his two other races in 1988 Gallic League finished unplaced in the July Cup and the William Hill Sprint Championship.

=== 1989: four-year-old season ===
On his first appearance of 1989, Gallic League ran fourth to Silver Fling in the Palace House Stakes and then produced his best effort for a year when he was runner-up to Indian Ridge in the Duke of York Stakes on 18 May. He was then sent to Ireland for the Group Three Ballyogan Stakes over five furlongs at the Curragh Racecourse on 5 June and started 5/2 favourite against fourteen opponents headed by the Cork and Orrery Stakes winner Big Shuffle. With Hills in the saddle he led from the start and won by five lengths from the Flying Childers Stakes winner Shuttlecock Corner. In June he made his second attempt to win the King's Stand Stakes and came much closer than in 1998 as he was beaten a neck and head into third by Indian Ridge and Tigani. His form deteriorated thereafter, and he finished unplaced in the July Cup, the Prix Maurice de Gheest and the Phoenix Sprint Stakes.

== Assessment ==
In the official International Classification for the European two-year-olds of 1987 Mister Majestic was rated the ninth best colt in Europe, seven pounds behind the top-rated Warning. The independent Timeform organisation gave him a rating of 119 p (the "p" indicating that he was expected to make more than usual improvement), eight pounds inferior to Warning, who was their best juvenile of the year. In their annual Racehorses of 1987, Timeform commented "look no further for the champion sprinter of 1998".

== Stud record ==
Gallic League was retired from racing to become a breeding stallion in Ireland and was later exported to South Africa. The best of his European offspring was probably Soreze, who won the Listed Marble Hill Stakes in 1994.

== Pedigree ==
Pedigree of Gallic League (GB), brown stallion, 1985
Sire Welsh Saint (IRE) 1966	St Paddy (GB); 1957	Aureole	Hyperion
Sire Welsh Saint (IRE) 1966	St Paddy (GB); 1957	Aureole	Angelola
Sire Welsh Saint (IRE) 1966	St Paddy (GB); 1957	Edie Kelly	Bois Roussel
Sire Welsh Saint (IRE) 1966	St Paddy (GB); 1957	Edie Kelly	Caerlissa
Sire Welsh Saint (IRE) 1966	Welsh Way (GB); 1954	Abernant	Owen Tudor
Sire Welsh Saint (IRE) 1966	Welsh Way (GB); 1954	Abernant	Rustom Mahal
Sire Welsh Saint (IRE) 1966	Welsh Way (GB); 1954	Winning Ways	Fairway
Sire Welsh Saint (IRE) 1966	Welsh Way (GB); 1954	Winning Ways	Honey Buzzard
Dam Red Rose Bowl (IRE) 1980	Dragonara Palace (USA); 1971	Young Emperor	Grey Sovereign
Dam Red Rose Bowl (IRE) 1980	Dragonara Palace (USA); 1971	Young Emperor	Young Empress
Dam Red Rose Bowl (IRE) 1980	Dragonara Palace (USA); 1971	Rubys Princess	Fidalgo
Dam Red Rose Bowl (IRE) 1980	Dragonara Palace (USA); 1971	Rubys Princess	Persian Ruby
Dam Red Rose Bowl (IRE) 1980	Loren (IRE); 1973	Crocket	King of the Tudors
Dam Red Rose Bowl (IRE) 1980	Loren (IRE); 1973	Crocket	Chandelier
Dam Red Rose Bowl (IRE) 1980	Loren (IRE); 1973	Gallissa	El Gallo
Dam Red Rose Bowl (IRE) 1980	Loren (IRE); 1973	Gallissa	Phoenissa (Family:5-h)
