= Ensconse =

American-bred Thoroughbred racehorse

- Sire: Lyphard
- Grandsire: Northern Dancer
- Dam: Carefully Hidden
- Damsire: Caro
- Sex: Mare
- Foaled: 20 March 1986
- Country: United States
- Colour: Bay
- Breeder: King Ranch
- Owner: Sheikh Mohammed
- Trainer: Luca Cumani
- Record: 7: 4-2-1
- Earnings: £158,070

Major wins
- Nell Gwyn Stakes (1989); Irish 1000 Guineas (1989)

Ensconse (foaled 20 March 1986) was an American-bred, British-trained Thoroughbred racehorse and broodmare. In 1988 she showed considerable promise as she won a twenty-five runner maiden race and the Blue Seal Stakes in her two racecourse appearances. In the following year she won the Nell Gwyn Stakes and finished fourth when favourite for the 1000 Guineas before recording her biggest success when winning the Irish 1000 Guineas. In her two remaining starts she was unlucky in running when sixth in the Prix de Diane and ran second in the Child Stakes. She was retired from racing at the end of the year to become a broodmare but produced only two foals, neither of whom had any success on the racecourse.

== Background ==
Ensconse was a bay mare with white socks on her front feet bred in Kentucky by King Ranch. As a yearling she was bought by Sheikh Mohammed and was sent to race in Europe. She was trained throughout her racing career by Luca Cumani at Newmarket, Suffolk and was ridden in all but one of her races by Ray Cochrane.

She was from the thirteenth crop of foals sired by Lyphard, an American-bred stallion who raced in France, winning the Prix Jacques Le Marois and Prix de la Forêt in 1972. Lyphard went on to become a very successful breeding stallion in both Europe and North America, siring Three Troikas, Dancing Brave and Manila. Her dam Carefully Hidden was a descendant of the influential American broodmare Iltis (foaled in 1947), the female-line ancestor of In Reality, Diamond Shoal, Glint of Gold and Tank's Prospect.

== Racing career ==
=== 1988: two-year-old season ===
Ensconse made her racecourse debut in a maiden race over six furlongs at Nottingham Racecourse on 5 September. Starting the 3/1 second favourite in a twenty-five runner field she took the lead two furlongs from the finish and won by three quarters of a length from the Michael Stoute-trained Dance Festival. Seventeen days later over the same distance at Ascot Racecourse the filly started joint-favourite for the Blue Seal Stakes. She took the lead approaching the last quarter mile and won by a length Guest Artiste.

=== 1989: three-year-old season ===
On 18 April 1989 Ensconse began her second season by contesting the Nell Gwyn Stakes (a major trial for the 1000 Guineas) over seven furlongs at Newmarket Racecourse and started the 2/1 joint favourite alongside Mythyaar. The other six runners included Guest Artiste, Muhbubh (Princess Margaret Stakes) and Miss Demure (Lowther Stakes). After being restrained by Cochrane in the early stages she accelerated in the last quarter mile, overtook the outsider Aldbourne inside the final furlong and won by one and a half lengths with two lengths back to Muhbubh in third.

In the 176th running of the 1000 Guineas over the Rowley Mile at Newmarket on 4 May, Ensconse started the 7/4 favourite ahead of Musical Bliss and Pass the Peace in a seven-runner field. She raced towards the rear of the field in a slowly-run race and was unable to make significant progress in the closing stages, finishing fourth behind Musical Bliss, Kerrera and Aldbourne. The Irish 1000 Guineas at the Curragh on 27 May saw Ensconse made the 13/8 favourite in a field of thirteen. Aldbourne and Dance Festival were again in opposition whilst the other runners included Flamenco Wave (Moyglare Stud Stakes), Tursanah (Athasi Stakes), Blasted Heath (Marble Hill Stakes) and Honoria (Railway Stakes). After tracking the leaders Ensconse took the lead approaching the last quarter mile, broke clear of her opponents and stayed on to win by two lengths from Aldbourne.

On 11 June Ensconse was sent to France and moved up in distance for the Prix de Diane over 2000 metres at Chantilly Racecourse. Ridden by Pat Eddery she was hampered at half way and dropped back to last place before staying on in the straight to finish sixth of the fourteen runners behind Lady In Silver. In July she was dropped back to one mile and started favourite for the Child Stakes at Newmarket in which she finished second to Magic Gleam.

== Breeding record ==
After her retirement from racing Ensconse became a broodmare for her owner's stud. She produced only two reported foals, neither of whom made any impact:

- Bal Masque, a chestnut colt (later gelded), foaled in 1991, sired by Alydar. Unplaced on only start.
- Hawash, colt, 1992, by Nashwan. Unraced.

== Pedigree ==
Pedigree of Ensconse (USA), bay mare, 1986
Sire Lyphard (USA) 1969	Northern Dancer (CAN); 1961	Nearctic	Nearco
Sire Lyphard (USA) 1969	Northern Dancer (CAN); 1961	Nearctic	Lady Angela
Sire Lyphard (USA) 1969	Northern Dancer (CAN); 1961	Natalma	Native Dancer
Sire Lyphard (USA) 1969	Northern Dancer (CAN); 1961	Natalma	Almahmoud
Sire Lyphard (USA) 1969	Goofed (USA); 1960	Court Martial	Fair Trial
Sire Lyphard (USA) 1969	Goofed (USA); 1960	Court Martial	Instantaneous
Sire Lyphard (USA) 1969	Goofed (USA); 1960	Barra	Formor
Sire Lyphard (USA) 1969	Goofed (USA); 1960	Barra	La Favorite
Dam Carefully Hidden (USA) 1979	Caro (IRE); 1967	Fortino	Grey Sovereign
Dam Carefully Hidden (USA) 1979	Caro (IRE); 1967	Fortino	Ranavalo
Dam Carefully Hidden (USA) 1979	Caro (IRE); 1967	Chambord	Chamossaire
Dam Carefully Hidden (USA) 1979	Caro (IRE); 1967	Chambord	Life Hill
Dam Carefully Hidden (USA) 1979	Treasure Chest (USA); 1962	Rough'n Tumble	Free For All
Dam Carefully Hidden (USA) 1979	Treasure Chest (USA); 1962	Rough'n Tumble	Roused
Dam Carefully Hidden (USA) 1979	Treasure Chest (USA); 1962	Iltis	War Relic
Dam Carefully Hidden (USA) 1979	Treasure Chest (USA); 1962	Iltis	We Hail (Family 21-a)
