= Frühjahrs-Meile =

- Class: Group 3
- Location: Düsseldorf Racecourse; Düsseldorf, Germany
- Inaugurated: 1982
- Race type: Flat / Thoroughbred
- Sponsor: Wettenleip
- Website: Düsseldorf

Race information
- Distance: 1,600 metres (1 mile)
- Surface: Turf
- Track: Right-handed
- Qualification: Four-years-old and up
- Weight: 57 kg Allowances; 1½ kg for fillies and mares 1 kg if not won €12,000 * Penalties; 3 kg for Group 1 winners * 2 kg for Group 2 winners * 1 kg for Group 3 winners * * since January 1 last year
- Purse: €55,000 (2013); 1st: €32,000

The Frühjahrs-Meile is a Group 3 flat horse race in Germany open to thoroughbreds aged four years or older. It is run over a distance of 1,600 metres (about 1 mile) at Düsseldorf in April.

== History ==
The event was established in 1982, and it was originally called the Ostermann-Pokal. It was initially contested over 1,200 metres at Gelsenkirchen. For a period it was held in June, July or August and open to horses aged three or older.

The Ostermann-Pokal was transferred to Cologne and extended to 1,600 metres in 1988. It was run under various sponsored titles after 1999.

The race moved to Frankfurt and became known as the Grosse Hessen Meile in 2007. It was renamed the Frankfurter Meile, switched to April and closed to three-year-olds in 2010.

The event was relocated to Düsseldorf and registered as the Frühjahrs-Meile in 2011. It is currently Germany's first Group race of the year.

== Records ==
Most successful horse (3 wins):

- Power Flame – 1997, 1998, 2000

Leading jockey (3 wins):

- Adrie de Vries – Alianthus (2011, 2012), Global Thrill (2013)
- Sibylle Vogt - Arcandi (2024), Geography (2025), New Emerald (2026)

Leading trainer (3 wins):

- Andreas Wöhler – Power Flame (1997, 1998, 2000)
- Andreas Lowe - Sehrezad (2009), Amaron (2014, 2015)
- Jens Hirschberger – Alianthus (2011, 2012), Global Thrill (2013)
- Peter Schiergen - Lateral (2006), Arcandi (2024), Geography (2025)

== Winners ==
Year	Winner	Age	Jockey	Trainer	Time
1982	Norman Style	4	Dave Richardson	Herbert Cohn	1:09.90
1983	Mister Rocks	5	Peter Alafi	Sven von Mitzlaff	1:11.60
1984	Red Rudy	4	Georg Bocskai	Heinz Jentzsch	1:10.40
1985	Gabitat	7	Paul Cook	Brian Gubby	1:10.50
1986	Tarib	3	Richard Hills	Harry Thomson Jones	1:10.10
1987	Roaring Riva	4	Michael Wigham	Willie Musson	1:13.90
1988	Just a Flutter	4	Bruce Raymond	Michael Jarvis	1:37.31
1989	Alkalde	4	Paul Eddery	Peter Lautner	1:38.10
1990	Maximilian	3	George Duffield	John Gosden	1:35.30
1991	Enharmonic	4	Willie Ryan	Lord Huntingdon	1:35.32
1992	Irish Stew	4	Andrzej Tylicki	Hans Blume	1:36.77
1993	Timely Threat	3	Neil Grant	Theo Grieper	1:38.83
1994	Ventiquattrofogli	4	Michael Roberts	John Dunlop	1:33.68
1995	A Magicman	3	Neil Grant	Hartmut Steguweit	1:33.70
1996	Orfijar	6	Billy Newnes	Peter Lautner	1:35.90
1997	Power Flame	4	Kevin Woodburn	Andreas Wöhler	1:36.16
1998	Power Flame	5	Kevin Woodburn	Andreas Wöhler	1:36.22
1999	Miss Tobacco	3	Pascal van de Keere	Ralf Suerland	1:32.05
2000	Power Flame	7	Andreas Suborics	Andreas Wöhler	1:41.22
2001	Banyumanik	5	Andreas Boschert	Mario Hofer	1:35.41
2002	Love Regardless	3	Keith Dalgleish	Mark Johnston	1:35.84
2003	Scapolo	5	Warren O'Connor	Christian von der Recke	1:38.74
2004	Pepperstorm	3	Andreas Boschert	Uwe Ostmann	1:34.20
2005	Proudance	3	Andreas Helfenbein	Ralf Suerland	1:44.53
2006	Lateral	3	William Mongil	Peter Schiergen	1:36.31
2007	Aspectus	4	Fredrik Johansson	Hans Blume	1:34.50
2008	Abbashiva	3	Norman Richter	Peter Rau	1:36.43
2009	Sehrezad	4	Jiri Palik	Andreas Löwe	1:39.02
2010	Enzio	4	Dominique Boeuf	Nicolas Millière	1:36.52
2011	Alianthus	6	Adrie de Vries	Jens Hirschberger	1:35.80
2012	Alianthus	7	Adrie de Vries	Jens Hirschberger	1:40.39
2013	Global Thrill	4	Adrie de Vries	Jens Hirschberger	1:41.00
2014	Amaron	5	Fabien Lefebvre	Andreas Lowe	1:37.58
2015	Amaron	6	Andrasch Starke	Andreas Lowe	1:41.84
2016	Guiliani	5	Filip Minarik	Jean-Pierre Carvalho	1:44.62
2017	Wonnemond	4	Bayarsaikhan Ganbat	Sascha Smrczek	1:34.99
2018	Millowitsch	5	Andreas Helfenbein	Markus Klug	1:38.80
2019	Stormy Antarctic	6	Gérald Mossé	Ed Walker	1:34.11
2020	Cancelled due to the coronavirus pandemic
2021	Zavaro	4	Rene Piechulek	Henk Grewe	1:43.50
2022	Mythico	4	Rene Piechulek	Jean-Pierre Carvalho	1:41.14
2023	See Hector	4	Lukas Delozier	Henk Grewe	1:38.43
2024	Arcandi	4	Sibylle Vogt	Peter Schiergen	1:36.59
2025	Geography	4	Sibylle Vogt	Peter Schiergen	1:35.50
2026	New Emerald	5	Sibylle Vogt	Marcel Weiss	1:37.80

== See also ==
- List of German flat horse races
- Recurring sporting events established in 1982 – this race is included under its original title, Ostermann-Pokal.
