= Mystiko (horse) =

American-bred Thoroughbred racehorse

- Sire: Secreto
- Grandsire: Northern Dancer
- Dam: Caracciola
- Damsire: Zeddaan
- Sex: Stallion
- Foaled: 1988
- Country: United Kingdom
- Colour: Grey
- Breeder: Kingston Park Stud
- Owner: Lady Beaverbrook
- Trainer: Clive Brittain
- Record: 13:4-1-1
- Earnings: £194,946

Major wins
- European Free Handicap (1991); 2000 Guineas (1991); Challenge Stakes (1991)

Mystiko (foaled 1988) was an American-bred, British-trained Thoroughbred racehorse and sire. In a career that lasted from July 1990 to October 1992 he ran thirteen times and won four races, all of them at Newmarket. After taking the European Free Handicap on his first appearance as a three-year-old he recorded his most important success when winning the 2000 Guineas seventeen days later. His subsequent form was disappointing, although he did win the Challenge Stakes that autumn. In 1993 he was retired to stud, but had little success.

== Background ==
Mystiko was a grey horse with a clearly defined white blaze and four white socks. He was bred by the Australian Kingston Park Stud, who sent a small number of mares to the United States to be bred to leading American stallions. Mystiko was sired by the Northern Dancer stallion Secreto, whose win in the 1984 Epsom Derby was the highlight of a brief racing career. He was acquired as a yearling by the Dowager Lady Beaverbrook.

Lady Beaverbrook was considered an eccentric character who gave most of her horses names consisting of one word with seven letters (Bustino, Terimon, Boldboy, Niniski, Petoski), as this was the most common form for Derby winners. Mystiko (Greek for "secret") was trained throughout his career by Clive Brittain at Newmarket, Suffolk. His most regular jockey was Michael Roberts who rode him in eleven of his thirteen starts.

== Racing career ==
=== 1990: two-year-old season ===
Mystiko made his first appearance in a six furlong maiden race at Newmarket in July in which he finished second to Act of Diplomacy after briefly taking the lead a furlong from the finish. Three weeks later he ran in another maiden race over the same course and distance. On this occasion he was allowed to lead from the start and was never seriously challenged, winning by two lengths from Wolf Hall who in turn finished eight lengths clear of the other nine runners. On his next start at the end of August he was moved up in class for the Group Two Gimcrack Stakes at York and finished third to the odds-on favourite Mujtahid.

=== 1991: three-year-old season ===
Mystiko began his three-year-old season on 17 April in the European Free Handicap over seven furlongs at Newmarket, in which he carried 128 pounds. He disputed the lead with Anjiz for the first five furlongs and then pulled steadily clear to win by 3 1/2 lengths from the filly Zigaura. On 4 May, Mystiko returned to Newmarket to run against thirteen other colts in the 2000 Guineas over one mile. The undefeated Craven Stakes winner Marju was made 6/4 favourite with Mystiko the second choice in the betting at 13/2. Mystiko was among the front-runners from the start and went into a clear lead three furlongs from the finish. In the final furlong he was strongly challenged by the French-trained colt Lycius, but maintained a narrow advantage to win the Classic by a head. The first two pulled six lengths clear of Ganges in third, with Generous in fourth.

As a result of his Newmarket win, Mystiko became regarded as one of the main contenders for the Derby a month later. At Epsom on 5 June he was the third choice in the betting at odds of 5/1 behind the 4/1 joint-favourites Corrupt and Toulon. Mystiko took the lead from the start and was still in front turning into the straight. Two and a half furlongs from the finish however, he was overtaken and dropped away quickly to finish tenth of the thirteen runners behind Generous, beaten more than thirty lengths. The race was his first and only attempt to run a distance further than one mile. On his first run after the Derby he finished last of the eight runners in the Sussex Stakes at Goodwood in July.

In September, Mystiko was tried over six furlongs for the first time in more than a year when he contested the Ladbroke Sprint Cup at Haydock. He appeared to be outpaced by the specialist sprinters and finished fourth behind Polar Falcon and Sheikh Albadou. Mystiko's final race of the year came in the Group Two Challenge Stakes over seven furlongs at Newmarket in October. Carrying top weight of 126 pounds he made all the running and drew clear of his opponents in the closing stages to win by two lengths from the filly Only Yours. All three of Mystiko's wins in 1991, like his maiden win the previous year, came on his home track at Newmarket: he appeared to have a distinct dislike of travel.

=== 1992: four-year-old season ===
Mystiko stayed in training as a four-year-old but made no impact. He finished unplaced in the Lockinge Stakes, the Celebration Mile, the Queen Elizabeth II Stakes and the Challenge Stakes.

== Stud career ==
Mystiko had a poor record as a stallion, siring the winners of fewer than a hundred races, none of them at Group level.

== Pedigree ==
Pedigree of Mystiko (USA), grey stallion, 1988
Sire Secreto (USA) 1981	Northern Dancer; 1961	Nearctic	Nearco
Sire Secreto (USA) 1981	Northern Dancer; 1961	Nearctic	Lady Angela
Sire Secreto (USA) 1981	Northern Dancer; 1961	Natalma	Native Dancer
Sire Secreto (USA) 1981	Northern Dancer; 1961	Natalma	Almahmoud
Sire Secreto (USA) 1981	Betty's Secret; 1977	Secretariat	Bold Ruler
Sire Secreto (USA) 1981	Betty's Secret; 1977	Secretariat	Somethingroyal
Sire Secreto (USA) 1981	Betty's Secret; 1977	Betty Lorraine	Prince John
Sire Secreto (USA) 1981	Betty's Secret; 1977	Betty Lorraine	Gay Hostess
Dam Caracciola (FR) 1978	Zeddaan; 1965	Grey Sovereign	Nasrullah
Dam Caracciola (FR) 1978	Zeddaan; 1965	Grey Sovereign	Kong
Dam Caracciola (FR) 1978	Zeddaan; 1965	Vareta	Vilmorin
Dam Caracciola (FR) 1978	Zeddaan; 1965	Vareta	Veronique
Dam Caracciola (FR) 1978	Cendres Bleues; 1968	Charlotteville	Prince Chevalier
Dam Caracciola (FR) 1978	Cendres Bleues; 1968	Charlotteville	Noorani
Dam Caracciola (FR) 1978	Cendres Bleues; 1968	Aigue-Vive	Vatellor
Dam Caracciola (FR) 1978	Cendres Bleues; 1968	Aigue-Vive	Vice-Versa (Family:1-t)
