= Louis Freedman =

British businessman and racehorse owner

Louis Freedman CBE (1917–1998) was a British businessman and racehorse owner and breeder. He was chairman of Land Securities from 1957 to 1977 and in horse racing he was the owner and breeder of a number of top-class racehorses, most notably the 1987 Epsom Derby and St Leger Stakes winner Reference Point.

== Biography ==
Louis Freedman was born on 5 February 1917.

He was a member of the Race Relations Board from 1968 to 1977 and was made a CBE for services to race relations. He was also a member of the Jockey Club and president of the Racehorse Owners Association in 1973-74.

He died at Cliveden on 21 December 1998.
