= Roaring Riva =

British-bred Thoroughbred racehorse

- Sire: Music Boy
- Grandsire: Jukebox
- Dam: Elton Abbess
- Damsire: Tamerlane
- Sex: Stallion
- Foaled: 21 February 1983
- Country: United Kingdom
- Colour: Bay
- Breeder: Newsells Park Stud
- Owner: W A Gaff; A P Field
- Trainer: Ray Laing; Willie Musson
- Record: 17: 4-1-0

Major wins
- Phoenix Stakes (1985); Ostermann-Pokal (1987)

Awards
- Timeform rating 103 (1985), 101 (1986, 1987)

Roaring Riva (21 February 1983 – after 1998) was a British Thoroughbred racehorse and sire. He raced in at least four countries and won four of his seventeen races. A specialist sprinter, he showed his best form as a two-year-old in 1985, when he won three races including the Phoenix Stakes. He did not win again until 1987, when he won the Ostermann-Pokal in Germany. He made no impact as a sire of winners.

== Background ==
Roaring Riva was a "strong", "rangy" bay horse with a white star and a white sock on his right hind leg, bred in England by the Newsells Park Stud. As a yearling he was put up for auction and sold for 15,000 guineas. He entered the ownership of Billy Gaff, the former manager of Rod Stewart (and founder of Riva Records), and was sent into training with Ray Laing at his Delamere House stable at Lambourn. Laing trained horses for many other people in the pop music industry including Chris Wright and Dave Robinson: his training yard was also visited by George Martin, Alvin Stardust, Liza Goddard and Robert Morley and was described as Berkshire's answer to Annabel's.

Roaring Riva was one of the best horses sired by Music Boy, a sprinter whose wins included the Gimcrack Stakes in 1975 and the King George Stakes in the following year. His dam Elton Abbess showed modest racing ability, winning three minor races from 22 starts. She was descended from the British broodmare Perfume (foaled 1933) who was the female-line ancestor of several other major winners including My Babu, Sayani and English Prince.

== Racing career ==
=== 1985: two-year-old season ===
Roaring Riva began his racing career by winning a maiden race over five furlongs at Windsor Racecourse and then followed up by taking a minor event over six furlongs at the same track. In early July he was sent to York Racecourse to contest the Black Duck Stakes and finished second, beaten half a length by Nomination, a colt who went on to beat Green Desert in the Richmond Stakes. The colt was then sent to Ireland and moved up in class for the Group 1 Phoenix Stakes over six furlongs on soft ground at Phoenix Park Racecourse. Ridden by Ray Cochrane he started the 4/1 second favourite behind the highly regarded, but previously unraced Tate Gallery, with the best-fancied of the other eleven runners being the unbeaten filly Sherkraine, Devil's Run and Mr John. Roaring Riva was among the leaders from the start, went to the front two furlongs out and held off the challenge of the filly So Directed to win by three quarters of a length. Laing recalled that it was "quite a day. We had private planes, champagne, the lot!"

Roaring Riva failed to add to his reputation in three subsequent races that year. He finished unplaced behind the filly Bambolona in the Sirenia Stakes at Kempton Park Racecourse in September and later that month came home eighth of the nine runners in the Mill Reef Stakes at Newbury. On his final appearance of the year he was dropped back to five furlongs for the Cornwallis Stakes at Ascot Racecourse in October and finished unplaced behind Hallgate.

At the end of the year, the independent Timeform organisation gave Roaring Riva a rating of 103, making him 29 pounds inferior to their top-rated juvenile Huntingdale. In their annual Racehorses of 1985 Timeform praised Laing's skill at placing the horse to win a Group 1 race but opined that Roaring Riva was "some way removed from top class".

=== 1986: three-year-old season ===
After finishing fourth over five furlongs on his three-year-old debut Roaring Riva contested the Greenham Stakes over seven furlongs at Newbury on 19 April and finished fourth of the nine runners behind Faustus. After the race he was sold privately and transferred to the stable of Willie Musson at Newmarket. He was unplaced in four subsequent races, including the Vernons Sprint Cup, producing his best effort on his final start when he finished a close fifth behind Parioli in the Prix de Seine-et-Oise at Maisons-Laffitte Racecourse in late September.

=== 1987: four-year-old season ===
Roaring Riva finished unplaced on his first two starts in the spring of 1987 and was then off the track for two months. In June he was sent to Germany to contest the Group 3 Ostermann-Pokal over 1200 metres at Gelsenkirchen. Ridden by Michael Wigham he won narrowly from the locally trained five-year-old Germinal, with the French challenger Cedrico in third. After finishing unplaced on his only subsequent start Roaring Riva was retired from racing.

== Stud record ==
Roaring Riva began his career as a breeding stallion at the Cliffords Farm Stud at Richmond, North Yorkshire. He sired a few minor winners but nothing of any consequence. His last reported foals were born in 1999.

== Pedigree ==
Pedigree of Roaring Riva (GB), bay stallion, 1983
Sire Music Boy (GB) 1973	Jukebox (GB); 1966	Sing Sing	Tudor Minstrel
Sire Music Boy (GB) 1973	Jukebox (GB); 1966	Sing Sing	Agin the Law
Sire Music Boy (GB) 1973	Jukebox (GB); 1966	Bibi Mah	Tehran
Sire Music Boy (GB) 1973	Jukebox (GB); 1966	Bibi Mah	Mulier Magnifica
Sire Music Boy (GB) 1973	Veronique (GB); 1961	Matador	Golden Cloud
Sire Music Boy (GB) 1973	Veronique (GB); 1961	Matador	Spanish Galantry
Sire Music Boy (GB) 1973	Veronique (GB); 1961	Narcisse	Niccolo dell'Arca
Sire Music Boy (GB) 1973	Veronique (GB); 1961	Narcisse	Asphodele
Dam Elton Abbess (GB) 1974	Tamerlane (GB); 1952	Persian Gulf	Bahram
Dam Elton Abbess (GB) 1974	Tamerlane (GB); 1952	Persian Gulf	Double Life
Dam Elton Abbess (GB) 1974	Tamerlane (GB); 1952	Eastern Empress	Nearco
Dam Elton Abbess (GB) 1974	Tamerlane (GB); 1952	Eastern Empress	Cheveley Lady
Dam Elton Abbess (GB) 1974	Tragara (GB); 1964	Buisson Ardent	Relic
Dam Elton Abbess (GB) 1974	Tragara (GB); 1964	Buisson Ardent	Rose O'Lynn
Dam Elton Abbess (GB) 1974	Tragara (GB); 1964	Romantica	Never Say Die
Dam Elton Abbess (GB) 1974	Tragara (GB); 1964	Romantica	Vertige (Family 1-w)
