= Take Control (horse) =

American Thoroughbred racehorse

- Sire: A.P. Indy
- Grandsire: Seattle Slew
- Dam: Azeri
- Damsire: Jade Hunter
- Sex: Colt
- Foaled: 2007
- Country: United States
- Colour: Chestnut
- Breeder: Allen E. Paulson Living Trust
- Owner: Kaleem Shah
- Trainer: Bob Baffert
- Record: 4: 2-0-0
- Earnings: $70,450

Take Control (February 14, 2007 – October 17, 2013) was an American Thoroughbred racehorse.

Take Control was the son of two Horses of the Year: A.P. Indy and Azeri. In September, Azeri's A.P. Indy yearling colt, Vallenzeri (his previous name), was bought back by the trust for a Keeneland-record $7.7 million. Take Control was bought by Kaleem Shah at the Keeneland 2 year old in Training Sale in 2009.

He was trained by Bob Baffert.

== Breeding and early life ==
Take Control was born on February 14, 2007, at Hill N Dale Farm in Lexington, KY. He was previously named Vallenzeri - the "V" referring to Valentine's Day (the day he was born), "allen" referencing Allen Paulson and "zeri" referencing his mother, Azeri. He was consigned to the yearling sale, where he was bought back for $7.7 million by his previous owner, the Allen Paulson trust. Later he was sold at the Keeneland 2 year old in Training Sale to Kaleem Shah, CEO of Calnet.

== Racing career ==
Take Control won his career debut at Santa Anita Park, running over one mile. The chestnut colt rallied from last in his debut race on December 30, 2009, earning $27,000 for the win. He was then sidelined shortly after with a front shin injury and pointed towards a summer campaign. Bob Baffert said he was pointing him towards Saratoga's Travers Stakes.

Sore shins and assorted other problems had kept the chestnut away from the races throughout 2010 and for much of 2011. On June 30, 2012, Take Control won his first start back in a $52,000 Allowance Optional Claiming race at Betfair Hollywood Park. Take Control defeated 9 other horses in 1:45.24 winning by a length and half margin. In July 2012, Take Control placed fourth in the Grade 2 Del Mar Handicap.

After another long layoff, he returned to the track in September 2013. He ran in the Grade 1 Awesome Again Stakes, finishing 10th and last.

On October 17, 2013, Take Control broke down during a workout at Santa Anita Park, and was euthanized as a result of the injury.
