= Elbio =

Elbio is a Spanish male given name. Notable people with the name include:

- Elbio Anaya (1889–1986), Argentinian general
- Elbio Rosselli, Uruguayan politician
- Elbio Álvarez (born 1994), Uruguayan football player
