= Reference Point (horse) =

British-bred Thoroughbred racehorse

- Racing colours of Louis Freedman
- Sire: Mill Reef
- Grandsire: Never Bend
- Dam: Home on the Range
- Damsire: Habitat
- Sex: Stallion
- Foaled: 26 February 1984
- Country: Great Britain
- Colour: Bay
- Breeder: Louis Freedman
- Owner: Louis Freedman
- Trainer: Henry Cecil
- Record: 10: 7-1-1
- Earnings: $1,252,819

Major wins
- William Hill Futurity (1986); Dante Stakes (1987); Epsom Derby (1987); K. George VI & Q. Elizabeth Stakes (1987); Great Voltigeur Stakes (1987); St. Leger Stakes (1987)

Awards
- British Horse of the Year (1987)

Honours
- Timeform rating: 139
- Last updated on August 28, 2007

Reference Point (26 February 1984– December 1991) was a British Thoroughbred race horse and sire. In a career which lasted from August 1986 to October 1987 he ran ten times and won seven races. As a three-year-old he overcame sinus problems before winning York's Dante Stakes, the Derby, Ascot's King George VI and Queen Elizabeth Diamond Stakes, the Great Voltigeur and St. Leger in 1987. It was not until 2012 that another Derby winner contested the St. Leger; when Camelot attempted, and failed, to win the English Triple Crown. His final race of the season resulted in failure in the Prix de l'Arc de Triomphe at Longchamp, Paris when an abscess was later found to have been responsible for his below-par performance.

== Background ==
Reference Point was a dark-coated bay horse bred by his owner, Louis Freedman, at his Cliveden Stud in Berkshire, England. He was sired by Mill Reef the 1971 Epsom Derby winner who went on to be Leading sire in Great Britain and Ireland in 1978 and 1987. Reference Point's dam, Home On The Range, was a high class racemare who won the Sun Chariot Stakes in 1981. Apart from Reference Point, the best of her progeny was Known Ranger, who won nineteen races in Europe and North America.

== Racing career ==
=== 1986: two-year-old season ===
Reference Point ran three times as a two-year-old in 1986. He was the beaten 11/10 favourite when finishing third behind Port Helene and Brother Patrick on his debut in the EBF Heart of Variety Stakes over a mile at Sandown Park on 30 August 1986. On his second outing of 1986 he returned to the same course and distance on 23 September and won the Dorking Stakes by eight lengths from Mulhollande. His final two-year-old run saw him step up to Group One class in the William Hill Futurity at Doncaster. He was sent off 4 to 1 second favourite behind Henry Cecil's first string, Suhailie but ran out the five length winner from Bengal Fire, with Love The Groom in third. His win at Doncaster led to Reference Point being the highest rated European two-year-old of 1986,

=== 1987: three-year-old season ===
In early 1987, Reference Point's training was disrupted by sinus problems, which required surgery, ruling out any possibility of a challenge for the 2000 Guineas. On his three-year-old debut, Reference Point ran in the Dante Stakes at York, a recognised trial race for the Epsom Derby. Reference Point led from the start and ran on strongly in the closing stages to win by a length from Ascot Knight.

At Epsom, Reference Point started 6/4 favourite in a field of nineteen runners. Cauthen sent the colt into the lead from the start, and in the straight he turned back a series of challenges to win by one and a half lengths from Most Welcome and Bellotto. The winning time of 2:33.90 was the fastest since Mahmoud's hand-timed record of 2:33.8 in 1936.

On his first start after his Derby win, Reference Point raced against older horses for the first time in the Eclipse Stakes at Sandown over ten furlongs. Reference Point led from the start, setting such a "furious gallop" that the designated pacemaker, Media Starguest was unable to reach the front. Two furlongs out he was challenged by Mtoto, ridden by Michael Roberts. The two horses raced together in the closing stages before Mtoto pulled ahead to prevail by three quarters a length, with Triptych taking third. Three weeks later, Reference Point returned to twelve furlongs in the King George VI and Queen Elizabeth Diamond Stakes at Ascot. Starting the 11/10 favourite, he led the field into the straight and then pulled clear in the final quarter mile to win by three lengths from Celestial Storm and Triptych.

The decision was made to aim Reference Point for both the St Leger and the Prix de l'Arc de Triomphe. In his prep race he ran in the Great Voltigeur Stakes at York in August. He won comfortably at odds of 1/10, but sustained a minor injury when slipping on the heavily watered ground. Only six horses opposed him in the St Leger at Doncaster in September. He started the 4/11 favourite and won by one and a half lengths from Mountain Kingdom. The win took his earnings to £774,275, a record for a horse racing exclusively in Britain. On his final start, Reference Point started odds-on favourite for the Prix de l'Arc de Triomphe at Longchamp in October. As usual, he led from the start, but in the straight he weakened abruptly and finished eighth behind Trempolino. He returned from the race lame, and was found to be suffering from an abscess in his foot. Reference Point did not race again and was retired to stud.

== Assessment ==
Reference Point was given a Timeform rating of 139, the eleventh highest awarded to any horse up to that time, and higher than those of Nijinsky, Alleged and Troy. In their book A Century of Champions, John Randall and Tony Morris rated Reference Point the thirty-sixth best British horse of the 20th Century and the second best Derby winner of the 1980s behind Shergar.

The BBC sport correspondent Lee McKenzie rated him as one of his "six of the best" recent Derby winners' and explained that his "workmanlike" racing style sometimes led to his being overlooked.

Reference Point was voted 1987 British Horse of the Year by the Racecourse Association, attracting twelve of the twenty votes.

== Stud record ==
Reference Point made little impact in four seasons at stud, with his only Group One winner being Ivyanna, who won the 1992 Oaks d'Italia. He died after fracturing a leg in an accident in December 1991 at the Dalham Hall Stud where he was buried.

== Pedigree ==
Pedigree of Reference Point, bay stallion, 1984
Sire Mill Reef (USA) 1968	Never Bend (USA); 1960	Nasrullah	Nearco
Sire Mill Reef (USA) 1968	Never Bend (USA); 1960	Nasrullah	Mumtaz Begum
Sire Mill Reef (USA) 1968	Never Bend (USA); 1960	Lalun	Djeddah
Sire Mill Reef (USA) 1968	Never Bend (USA); 1960	Lalun	Be Faithful
Sire Mill Reef (USA) 1968	Milan Mill (USA); 1962	Princequillo	Prince Rose
Sire Mill Reef (USA) 1968	Milan Mill (USA); 1962	Princequillo	Cosquilla
Sire Mill Reef (USA) 1968	Milan Mill (USA); 1962	Virginia Water	Count Fleet
Sire Mill Reef (USA) 1968	Milan Mill (USA); 1962	Virginia Water	Red Ray
Dam Home on the Range (GB) 1978	Habitat (USA); 1966	Sir Gaylord	Turn-To
Dam Home on the Range (GB) 1978	Habitat (USA); 1966	Sir Gaylord	Somethingroyal
Dam Home on the Range (GB) 1978	Habitat (USA); 1966	Little Hut	Occupy
Dam Home on the Range (GB) 1978	Habitat (USA); 1966	Little Hut	Savage Beauty
Dam Home on the Range (GB) 1978	Great Guns (GB); 1971	Busted	Crepello
Dam Home on the Range (GB) 1978	Great Guns (GB); 1971	Busted	Sans le Sou
Dam Home on the Range (GB) 1978	Great Guns (GB); 1971	Byblis	Grey Sovereign
Dam Home on the Range (GB) 1978	Great Guns (GB); 1971	Byblis	Niobe (Family:10-d)
