= Ray Cochrane =

Northern Irish jockey and sports agent

Personal information
- Born: 18 June 1957 (age 69) Banbridge, County Down, Northern Ireland
- Occupation: Jockey

Horse racing career
- Sport: Horse racing

Major racing wins
- British Classic Race wins: 1000 Guineas Stakes (1986); Derby Stakes (1988); Oaks Stakes (1986); Irish Classic Race wins: Irish 1,000 Guineas (1989); Irish Derby (1988); Other major race wins: Champion Stakes (1989); Coronation Cup (1989); Diamond Jubilee Stakes (1991); July Cup (1984, 1991); Lockinge Stakes (1987, 1992); Middle Park Stakes (1986); Phoenix Stakes (1985, 1989); Poule d'Essai des Pouliches (1999); Prix de l'Abbaye de Longchamp (1998); Queen Anne Stakes (1987); Queen Elizabeth II Stakes (1991); St. James's Palace Stakes (1984, 1987); Sun Chariot Stakes (1987); Sussex Stakes (1984); Yorkshire Oaks (1993)

Racing awards
- Lester Awards: Flat Jockey Special Recognition (2000)

Honours
- Queen's Commendation for Bravery

Significant horses
- Chief Singer, Ensconse, Kahyasi, Legal Case, Midway Lady, Mister Majestic, Only Royale, Pharaoh's Delight, Polish Patriot, Roaring Riva, Selkirk, Sheriff's Star, Valentine Waltz

Ray Cochrane (born 18 June 1957 in Banbridge, County Down, Northern Ireland) is a retired Northern Irish horse racing jockey and current sports agent.

Cochrane was the winning jockey in three of the five British Classic Races: the 1000 Guineas Stakes and Epsom Oaks on Midway Lady, trained by Ben Hanbury in 1986, and the Epsom Derby on Kahyasi for his retained stable of Luca Cumani in 1988. Cochrane was also second in the 2000 Guineas Stakes on Chief Singer in 1984 and won the Group 1 July Cup at Newmarket and Sussex Stakes at Goodwood on the same horse. Cochrane received a Flat Jockey Special Recognition Lester Award in 2000.

Cochrane received the Queen's Commendation for Bravery in 2002 for saving the life of fellow jockey Frankie Dettori following a plane crash in 2000. The light aircraft they were travelling in crashed at Newmarket and burst into flames moments after takeoff, killing the pilot. Cochrane subsequently became Dettori's agent, a role he fulfilled until 2020.

== Major wins ==
(United Kingdom) Great Britain

- 1000 Guineas Stakes – Midway Lady (1986)
- Champion Stakes – Legal Case (1989)
- Coronation Cup – Sheriff's Star (1989)
- Derby Stakes – Kahyasi (1988)
- Diamond Jubilee Stakes – Polish Patriot (1991)
- July Cup – (2) – Chief Singer (1984), Polish Patriot (1991)
- Lockinge Stakes – (2) – Then Again (1987), Selkirk (1992)
- Middle Park Stakes – Mister Majestic (1986)
- Oaks Stakes – Midway Lady (1986)
- Queen Anne Stakes – Then Again (1987)
- Queen Elizabeth II Stakes – Selkirk (1991)
- St. James's Palace Stakes – (2) – Chief Singer (1984), Half a Year (1987)
- Sun Chariot Stakes – Infamy (1987)
- Sussex Stakes – Chief Singer (1984)
- Yorkshire Oaks – Only Royale (1993)

(Republic of Ireland) Ireland

- Irish 1,000 Guineas – Ensconse (1989)
- Irish Derby – Kahyasi (1988)
- Phoenix Stakes – (2) – Roaring Riva (1985), Pharaoh's Delight (1989)

France

- Poule d'Essai des Pouliches – Valentine Waltz (1999)
- Prix de l'Abbaye de Longchamp – My Best Valentine (1998)

Italy

- Premio Presidente della Repubblica – Artan (1997)

== See also ==
- List of jockeys
