= Russian Rhythm =

American-bred Thoroughbred racehorse

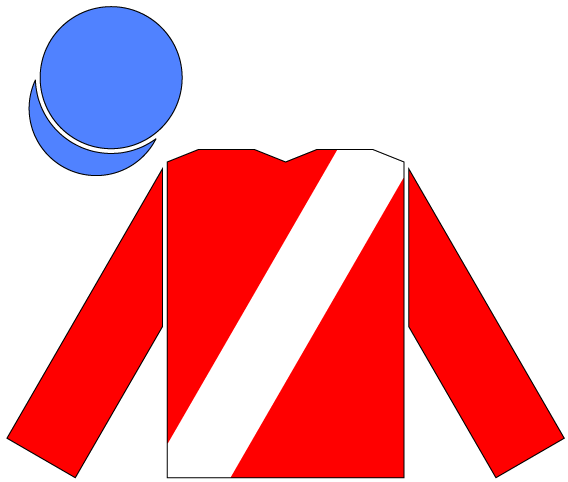
- Racing colours of Cheveley Park Stud
- Sire: Kingmambo
- Grandsire: Mr. Prospector
- Dam: Balistroika
- Damsire: Nijinsky
- Sex: Mare
- Foaled: 12 February 2000
- Country: United States
- Colour: Chestnut
- Breeder: Brushwood Stable
- Owner: Cheveley Park Stud
- Trainer: Michael Stoute
- Record: 10: 7-2-0
- Earnings: £770,120

Major wins
- Princess Margaret Stakes (2002); Lowther Stakes (2002); 1000 Guineas (2003); Coronation Stakes (2003); Nassau Stakes (2003); Lockinge Stakes (2004)

Awards
- European Champion Three-Year-Old Filly (2003); British Champion Three-Year-Old Filly (2003)
- Last updated on June 21, 2007

Russian Rhythm is a retired Thoroughbred racehorse and active broodmare who was bred in the United States but trained in the United Kingdom. During a racing career which lasted from June 2002 until May 2004 she ran ten times and won seven races. In 2003 her wins included the Classic 1000 Guineas, the Coronation Stakes and the Nassau Stakes and at the end of the season she was voted European Champion Three-Year-Old Filly at the Cartier Racing Awards. After winning the Lockinge Stakes on her only race in 2003 her racing career was ended by injury and she retired to become a broodmare.

== Background ==
Russian Rhythm was foaled at Elizabeth Moran's Brushwood Stable near Malvern, Pennsylvania. She was sired by Kingmambo out of the mare Balistroika, making her a half-sister of the Royal Lodge Stakes winner Perfectperformance and a close relative of several top-class fillies such as Shadayid (1,000 Guineas) and Park Appeal (Cheveley Park Stakes).

She was sent as a weanling to the Keeneland November sale, where she was sold for $370,000. As a yearling she was sent by the consignor Ted Voute to England for the October 2001 Tattersalls sale in which she was sold for 440,000 guineas to the Cheveley Park Stud. She entered training at Sir Michael Stoute's stable at Newmarket and was ridden in all her races by Kieren Fallon. She was a tall, strong filly, with a rich chestnut coat and a small white star.

== Racing career ==
=== 2002: two-year-old season ===
Russian Rhythm began her career with a win in a maiden race at Newmarket in June 2002, and successfully made the step-up to Group Three company a month later by "comfortably" winning the Princess Margaret Stakes at Ascot. She then moved up to Group Two for the Lowther Stakes at York where she started as odds-on favourite. She was badly hampered during the race and then trapped on the rails before finding a gap and accelerating through it to beat the Irish-trained filly Danaskaya by one and a quarter lengths. She was praised by her trainer for her effort: "Not many could have done what she has done today. She has both acceleration and guts".

Her reputation was growing, and in the Group One Cheveley Park Stakes she was sent off 8/13 favourite. Russian Rhythm ran prominently and led a furlong out, but was caught and beaten one and a half lengths by Airwave, a specialist sprinter who went on to win the Temple Stakes. Despite her defeat- the only occasion in her career that she was beaten by a filly or mare- she went into the winter break as 5/1 joint favourite for the 1,000 Guineas.

When the International Classification of two-year-old was published in January 2003, Russian Rhythm was awarded a rating of 116 – one pound behind Airwave and five behind the champion Six Perfections.

=== 2003: three-year-old season ===
Russian Rhythm went into the 2003 1,000 Guineas without a prep race, having been reportedly slow to reach peak condition in the spring. Stoute made no secret of the fact that the filly was performing poorly in exercise gallops and had been "not eating as well as she can". These facts, together with the memory of her defeat in the Cheveley Park, and the strength of the opposition, led to her going off a relatively unconsidered 12/1 shot. On the day she was held up in the early stages of a rough race, before switching right to take the lead inside the final furlong and winning by one and a half lengths from a field which was described as "one of the strongest...in recent years" including Six Perfections, Soviet Song, Intercontinental, Casual Look and Yesterday.

Her next start was in the Coronation Stakes at Royal Ascot where she confirmed her superiority over Soviet Song with an "emphatic" one and a half-length victory, breaking the course record in the process. She also became the first 1,000 Guineas to win the Ascot race since One In A Million in 1979. In her next race, Russian Rhythm contested the Nassau Stakes at Goodwood, where she was asked to take on older fillies and a middle-distance trip for the first time. Unsuited by the soft ground, and briefly unable to obtain a clear run, she proved just equal to the task, catching the leader, Ana Marie, in the closing stages and winning by a neck.

In her remaining starts of 2003, she faced male opposition in two of the most competitive races of the year. At Ascot, she ran up to her best form to finish second to the 6-4 favourite Falbrav in the Queen Elizabeth II Stakes after which she was given "almost as enthusiastic a reception as the winner" by the crowd. In her final start of the season, she finished fifth to Rakti in the Champion Stakes. Although she finished in front of major winners like Alamshar (King George VI and Queen Elizabeth Stakes) and Nayef (Prince of Wales's Stakes), she failed to produce her usual acceleration. Chris Richardson, the managing director of the Cheveley Park Stud, conceded that, "maybe we went to the well once too often.".

=== 2004: four-year-old season ===
Kept in training at four, Russian Rhythm looked set for a successful year after beating a strong field including Refuse To Bend in the Lockinge Stakes. Michael Stoute praised the filly after the race: "This filly is simply a pleasure to have around. She's got the mind, and she's got the physique. She's tough and professional in her job and does not lack courage.". Russian Rhythm sustained an injury soon afterwards, however, and did not race again, being retired in September.

== Race record ==
Date	Race	Dist (f)	Course	Class	Prize (£K)	Odds	Runners	Placing	Margin	Time	Jockey	Trainer
28 June 2002	Villas At Stonehaven EBF Maiden Fillies' Stakes	6	Newmarket July	M	4	9/4	6	1	Neck	1:12.60	Kieren Fallon	Michael Stoute
3 May 2002	Princess Margaret Stakes	6	Ascot	3	26	Evens	6	1	1.25	1:15.30	Kieren Fallon	Michael Stoute
22 August 2002	Lowther Stakes	6	York	2	50	8/13	5	1	1.25	1:11.05	Kieren Fallon	Michael Stoute
4 October 2002	Cheveley Park Stakes	6	Newmarket Rowley	1	87	8/13	6	2	1.5	1:10.72	Kieren Fallon	Michael Stoute
4 May 2003	1,000 Guineas	8	Newmarket Rowley	1	185	12/1	19	1	1.5	1:38.43	Kieren Fallon	Michael Stoute
20 June 2003	Coronation Stakes	8	Ascot	1	156	4/7	9	1	1.5	1:38.51	Kieren Fallon	Michael Stoute
2 August 2003	Nassau Stakes	10	Goodwood	1	116	4/5	8	1	Neck	2:04.80	Kieren Fallon	Michael Stoute
27 September 2003	Queen Elizabeth II Stakes	8	Ascot	1	188	3/1	8	2	2	1:38.99	Kieren Fallon	Michael Stoute
18 October 2003	Champion Stakes	10	Newmarket Rowley	1	232	11/4	12	5	6.25	2:03.34	Kieren Fallon	Michael Stoute
15 May 2004	Lockinge Stakes	8	Newbury	1	116	3/1	15	1	0.5	1:37.00	Kieren Fallon	Michael Stoute

.

== Assessment and honours ==
Russian Rhythm was awarded the title of European Three-Year-Old Champion Filly at the 2003 Cartier Racing Awards.

In the same year, she was named British Champion Three-Year-Old Filly by the British Horseracing Board.

The Listed Russian Rhythm Stakes is run in August at Penn National Race Course.

== Stud career ==
Russian Rhythm was retired to stud at her owner's base, the Cheveley Park Stud at Newmarket. Her second foal, Safina (by Pivotal), won a maiden race at Chester and finished fourth in the Group Three Nell Gwyn Stakes in 2010.

2006 Barynya (GB) : Chesnut filly, foaled 9 February, by Pivotal (GB) – placed 3 times from three starts in England 2009

2007 Safina (GB) : Chesnut filly, foaled 29 January, by Pivotal (GB) – won 1 race and placed 3 times including 3rd LR Sandingham Stakes, Ascot; 4th G3Nell Gwyn Stakes, Newmarket in England 2009–10

2008 Zykina (GB) : Chesnut filly, foaled 6 February, by Pivotal (GB) – unraced; dam of winners

2009

2010 Russian Realm (GB) : Bay colt (gelded), foaled 9 February, by Dansili (GB) – won 5 races and placed 8 times in the first three from 40 starts to date (14/08/17) in England 2012–17

2012 Russian Heroine (GB) : Bay filly, foaled 2 April, by Invincible Spirit (IRE) – won 2 races and placed 4 times from 9 starts in England 2014–15

2013 Russian Finale (GB) : by Dansili (GB) – unraced to date (end July 2015)

Russian Rhythm was put down after suffering a severe attack of colic on 20 August 2014.

== Pedigree ==
Pedigree of Russian Rhythm (USA), chestnut mare, 2000
Sire Kingmambo (USA) 1990	Mr. Prospector; 1970	Raise a Native	Native Dancer
Sire Kingmambo (USA) 1990	Mr. Prospector; 1970	Raise a Native	Raise You
Sire Kingmambo (USA) 1990	Mr. Prospector; 1970	Gold Digger	Nashua
Sire Kingmambo (USA) 1990	Mr. Prospector; 1970	Gold Digger	Sequence
Sire Kingmambo (USA) 1990	Miesque; 1984	Nureyev	Northern Dancer*
Sire Kingmambo (USA) 1990	Miesque; 1984	Nureyev	Special
Sire Kingmambo (USA) 1990	Miesque; 1984	Pasadoble	Prove Out
Sire Kingmambo (USA) 1990	Miesque; 1984	Pasadoble	Santa Quilla
Dam Balistroika (USA) 1988	Nijinsky; 1967	Northern Dancer*	Nearctic
Dam Balistroika (USA) 1988	Nijinsky; 1967	Northern Dancer*	Natalma
Dam Balistroika (USA) 1988	Nijinsky; 1967	Flaming Page	Bull Page
Dam Balistroika (USA) 1988	Nijinsky; 1967	Flaming Page	Flaring Top
Dam Balistroika (USA) 1988	Balidaress; 1973	Balidar	Will Somers
Dam Balistroika (USA) 1988	Balidaress; 1973	Balidar	Violet Bank
Dam Balistroika (USA) 1988	Balidaress; 1973	Innocence	Sea Hawk
Dam Balistroika (USA) 1988	Balidaress; 1973	Innocence	Novitiate (Family: 14-c)

- Russian Rhythm is inbred 3x4 to Northern Dancer, meaning that the stallion appears in both the third and fourth generations of her pedigree.
