= 2001 Epsom Derby =

- Location: Epsom Downs Racecourse
- Date: 9 June 2001
- Winning horse: Galileo
- Starting price: 11/4 jf
- Jockey: Michael Kinane
- Trainer: Aidan O'Brien
- Owner: Michael Tabor & Sue Magnier

Epsom Derby 2001
1-2-3
Galileo	Golan	Tobougg

Also Ran
4-5-6
Mr Combustible	Storming Home	Perfect Sunday
7-8-9
Dilshaan	Putra Sandhurst	Sunny Glenn
10-11-12
Chancellor	King Carew	Cashel Bay

The 2001 Epsom Derby was a horse race which took place at Epsom Downs on Saturday 9 June 2001. It was the 222nd running of the Derby, and it was won by the pre-race joint favourite Galileo. The winner was ridden by Michael Kinane and trained by Aidan O'Brien. The other joint favourite Golan finished second.

== Race details ==
- Sponsor: Vodafone
- Winner's prize money: £580,000
- Going: Good to Firm
- Number of runners: 12
- Winner's time: 2m 33.27s

== Full result ==
	*	Horse	Jockey	Trainer ^{†}	SP
1		Galileo	Michael Kinane	Aidan O'Brien (IRE)	11/4 jf
2	3½	Golan	Pat Eddery	Sir Michael Stoute	11/4 jf
3	nk	Tobougg	Frankie Dettori	Saeed bin Suroor	9/1
4	1¾	Mr Combustible	Richard Hills	Barry Hills	20/1
5	½	Storming Home	Michael Hills	Barry Hills	14/1
6	nk	Perfect Sunday	Richard Hughes	Barry Hills	9/2
7	1¾	Dilshaan	Johnny Murtagh	Sir Michael Stoute	5/1
8	1	Putra Sandhurst	Philip Robinson	Michael Jarvis	16/1
9	nk	Sunny Glenn	Jason Weaver	Nick Littmoden	150/1
10	6	Chancellor	Richard Quinn	Barry Hills	25/1
11	1¾	King Carew	Craig Williams	Mick Channon	200/1
12	1½	Cashel Bay	John Carroll	Luke Comer (IRE)	300/1

* The distances between the horses are shown in lengths or shorter. nk = neck.
† Trainers are based in Great Britain unless indicated.

== Winner's details ==
Further details of the winner, Galileo:

- Foaled: 30 March 1998 in Ireland
- Sire: Sadler's Wells; Dam: Urban Sea (Miswaki)
- Owner: Sue Magnier and Michael Tabor
- Breeder: David Tsui and Orpendale
- Rating in 2001 International Classifications: 129

== Form analysis ==
=== Two-year-old races ===
Notable runs by the future Derby participants as two-year-olds in 2000.

- Tobougg – 1st Prix de la Salamandre, 1st Dewhurst Stakes
- Storming Home – 2nd Solario Stakes, 9th Somerville Tattersall Stakes
- Perfect Sunday – 2nd Washington Singer Stakes
- Dilshaan – 1st Racing Post Trophy
- King Carew – 5th Autumn Stakes
- Cashel Bay – 16th Eyrefield Stakes

=== The road to Epsom ===
Early-season appearances in 2001 and trial races prior to running in the Derby.

- Galileo – 1st Ballysax Stakes, 1st Derrinstown Stud Derby Trial
- Golan – 1st 2,000 Guineas
- Tobougg – 9th 2,000 Guineas
- Mr Combustible – 1st Chester Vase
- Storming Home – 1st Blue Riband Trial Stakes, 3rd Dante Stakes
- Perfect Sunday – 1st Lingfield Derby Trial
- Dilshaan – 1st Dante Stakes
- Putra Sandhurst – 2nd Lingfield Derby Trial
- Sunny Glenn – 2nd Feilden Stakes, 6th Lingfield Derby Trial
- Chancellor – 1st Sandown Classic Trial
- Cashel Bay – 5th Leopardstown 2,000 Guineas Trial Stakes, 4th Amethyst Stakes, 6th Saval Beg Stakes, 12th Irish 2,000 Guineas

=== Subsequent Group 1 wins ===
Group 1 / Grade I victories after running in the Derby.

- Galileo – Irish Derby (2001), King George VI and Queen Elizabeth Stakes (2001)
- Golan – King George VI and Queen Elizabeth Stakes (2002)
- Storming Home – Champion Stakes (2002), Clement L. Hirsch Memorial Turf Championship (2003)

== Subsequent breeding careers ==
Leading progeny of participants in the 2001 Epsom Derby.

=== Sires of Classic winners ===
Galileo (1st) - Eleven time leading sire in Great Britain and Ireland and sire of 40 individual classic winners as of June 2020

- Frankel - 1st 2000 Guineas Stakes (2011), European Champion Two-Year-Old, Three-Year Old and Older Horse
- Australia - 1st Epsom Derby, 1st Irish Derby (2014)
- Waldgeist - 1st Prix de l'Arc de Triomphe (2019)
- Rip Van Winkle - 1st Sussex Stakes (2009), 1st Queen Elizabeth II Stakes (2009), 1st International Stakes (2010)
- Nightime - 1st Irish 1000 Guineas (2006) - Dam of Ghaiyyath (1st Coronation Cup 2020)

=== Sires of Group/Grade One winners ===
Golan (2nd)

- Beauty Flash - 1st Hong Kong Mile (2010), 1st Hong Kong Stewards' Cup (2011), 1st Queen's Silver Jubilee Cup (2011)
- Kibbutz - 1st Victoria Derby (2007)
- Missunited - 1st Galway Hurdle (2013), 2nd Ascot Gold Cup (2014)
- Golan Way - 1st Sharp Novices' Hurdle

Tobougg (3rd)

- The Pooka - 1st New Zealand 2000 Guineas (2007)
- Penny's Gift - 1st German 1,000 Guineas (2009)
- Screen Star - Dam of Lumiere (1st Cheveley Park Stakes 2015) and Sheikha Reika (1st E. P. Taylor Stakes 2018)
- Bouggler - 1st Mersey Novices' Hurdle (2009)

Storming Home (5th)

- Lion Tamer - 1st Victoria Derby (2010)
- Jakkalberry - 1st Gran Premio di Milano (2010)
- Flying Cloud - 2nd Pretty Polly Stakes (2010)
- Tempestatefloresco - 1st Summer Cup (2017)

=== Sires of National Hunt horses ===
Mr Combustible (4th)

- Goulanes - 1st Towton Novices' Chase (2013)
- Same Difference - 1st Fulke Walwyn Kim Muir Challenge Cup (2013)
- Busty Brown - 1st Monksfield Novice Hurdle (2012)
- Mackeys Forge - 2nd Festival Novice Hurdle (2011)

=== Other Stallions ===
Dilshaan (7th) - Damsire of Va Bank (3rd Bayerisches Zuchtrennen 2018)
Putra Sandhurst (8th) - Sired minor jumps winner
