= Alamshar =

Irish-bred Thoroughbred racehorse

- Sire: Key of Luck
- Grandsire: Chief's Crown
- Dam: Alaiyda
- Damsire: Shahrastani
- Sex: Stallion
- Foaled: April 18, 2000
- Died: August 20, 2026 (aged 26)
- Country: Ireland
- Colour: Bay
- Breeder: HH Aga Khan IV
- Owner: HH Aga Khan IV
- Trainer: John Oxx
- Record: 9: 5-1-1
- Earnings: £1,210,716

Major wins
- Beresford Stakes (2002); Derrinstown Stud Derby Trial (2003); Irish Derby (2003); King George VI and Queen Elizabeth Stakes (2003)

Awards
- British Champion Three-Year-Old Colt (2003)

Alamshar (18 April 2000 – 20 August 2026) was an Irish Thoroughbred racehorse and sire. He won five of his nine races in a career which lasted from September 2002 to September 2003. He was best known for his performances as a three-year-old when he overcame chronic injury problems to win the Irish Derby and the King George VI and Queen Elizabeth Stakes.

== Background ==
Alamshar, a "neat" bay colt with a diamond-shaped white star, was bred in Ireland by his owner, the Aga Khan. He was sired by the Kentucky bred Key of Luck, the winner of the Prix d'Arenberg. His dam Alaiyda, was a minor winner and a daughter of the disqualified Oaks "winner" Aliysa. He was therefore a product of one of his owner's most successful dam-lines, tracing back to the influential Mumtaz Mahal. Like many of his owner's horses, he was sent into training with John Oxx at the Curragh. He was ridden in all his races by Johnny Murtagh.

== Racing career ==
=== 2002: two-year-old season ===
Alamshar made in his debut in September 2002 with a comfortable win in a maiden race at Listowel. He was obviously well-regarded, as he was immediately moved up to Group Three company for the Beresford Stakes at the Curragh the following month. He showed himself to be a promising colt by finishing strongly to catch the Aidan O'Brien-trained favourite Brian Boru close to the finish and win by a head.

The form of the race was made to look even better when Brian Boru won the Group One Racing Post Trophy two weeks later to become winter favourite for the Derby, a race for which Alamshar had not been entered.

=== 2003: three-year-old season ===
==== Spring ====
Before he raced as a three-year-old, Alamshar's connections demonstrated their confidence in the colt by paying a £9,000 supplementary charge to add him to the entries for the Derby, and he appeared in the betting for the race at 14–1.

Alamshar's 2003 debut in the Ballysax Stakes was rather unsatisfactory. The race was expected to be a contest between Alamshar and the Aidan O'Brien-trained Alberto Giacometti, with a second O'Brien colt, Balestrini regarded as a pacemaker. Balestrini, however, having gone ten lengths clear, did not stop as expected. Alamshar finished strongly, but failed by half a length to catch the leader. His impressive performance in making up so much ground in the closing stages, led to Alamshar being made the new favourite for the Derby.

In the build-up to the Derby it was noted that Alamshar occupied the same stable box as the trainer's previous winner Sinndar, although Oxx insisted that it was a coincidence.

On his next appearance Alamshar was sent off at odds-on for the Derrinstown Stud Derby Trial and won by a head from The Great Gatsby. The win produced a mixed response; while the Alamshar had shown stamina and "courage", he was not particularly impressive. Even John Oxx admitted that it "wasn't a very spectacular performance", whilst pointing out that the colt was still recovering from a hoof abscess

==== Summer ====
Aga Khan's second racing colours, worn by Johnny Murtagh at the Curragh. The first colours were worn by Christophe Soumillon on Dalakhani.

At Epsom he was made 4-1 second favourite for the Derby and put in a creditable effort, finishing a close third to Kris Kin and The Great Gatsby. There were no excuses, with Johnny Murtagh saying that Alamshar "had every chance" although Oxx observed that "horses improve from the Derby".

Alamshar was then aimed for the Irish Derby in which he was matched against his owner's French-trained colt Dalakhani, the undefeated winner of the Prix du Jockey-Club. Shortly before the race Alamshar seemed most unlikely to take part, as back problems affected him so badly that he "couldn't walk straight", and his condition only improved after he was treated by a chiropractor. The two Aga Khan colts dominated both the betting and the finish of the race with Alamshar gaining a narrow, but decisive victory to inflict Dalakhani's first and only career defeat. The win was popular as Alamshar was the locally trained contender, a point emphasised by Murtagh: "Dalakhani... may be the king of France but he's on our turf now".

Four weeks later in the King George VI and Queen Elizabeth Stakes, Alamshar looked even better. In the words of Johnny Murtagh, "he came alive in my hands", after tracking the leaders into the straight and pulled away to win by three and a half lengths from Sulamani, with Kris Kin third and top performers such as Falbrav, Warrsan, Grandera, Nayef, Millenary and Bollin Eric among the also-rans. The Guardian's correspondent called the race "one of the strongest renewals of the King George for many years" and wrote that "Alamshar simply took them apart". Oxx expressed his satisfaction, describing it as "a no-worries race", whilst explaining that the horse's back problems had required "a lot of work".

==== Autumn ====
It might have been expected that Alamshar would have been aimed at the Prix de l'Arc de Triomphe, but with that race being targeted by Dalakhani, he was instead brought back to shorter distances, over which he was unable to reproduce his summer form. Oxx ruled out the idea of aiming the colt at the Breeders' Cup Classic saying "I am not one of these people who like to take wild chances with good horses and run them on dirt."

He ran well in the Irish Champion Stakes but was unable to produce the same acceleration he had shown at Ascot, finishing fourth behind High Chaparral, Falbrav and Islington.

There had been hopes that Alamshar would stay in training as a four-year-old, but in October, it was announced that he had been sold to the JRA and that the Champion Stakes at Newmarket would be his final race before going to stud in Japan.

At Newmarket he led at half way but was overtaken by Rakti two furlongs from the finish and faded into a disappointing sixth place.

== Race record ==
| Date | Race | Dist (f) | Course | Class | Prize (£K) | Odds | Runners | Placing | Margin | Time | Jockey | Trainer |
|---|---|---|---|---|---|---|---|---|---|---|---|---|
| 26 September 2002 | Harvest Festival European Breeders Fund Maiden | 8 | Listowel | M | 8 | 9/2 | 7 | 1 | 2 | 1:41.10 | Johnny Murtagh | John Oxx |
| 13 October 2002 | Beresford Stakes | 8 | The Curragh | 3 | 29 | 7/1 | 10 | 1 | Head | 1:44.90 | Johnny Murtagh | John Oxx |
| 13 April 2003 | Ballysax Stakes | 10 | Leopardstown | 3 | 29 | 5/4 | 5 | 2 | 0.5 | 2:05.90 | Johnny Murtagh | John Oxx |
| 11 May 2003 | Derrinstown Stud Derby Trial | 10 | Leopardstown | 2 | 55 | 8/15 | 6 | 1 | Head | 2:07.40 | Johnny Murtagh | John Oxx |
| 7 June 2003 | Derby | 12 | Epsom | 1 | 852 | 4/1 | 20 | 3 | 1 | 2:33.35 | Johnny Murtagh | John Oxx |
| 29 June 2003 | Irish Derby | 12 | The Curragh | 1 | 486 | 4/1 | 9 | 1 | 0.5 | 2:28.20 | Johnny Murtagh | John Oxx |
| 15 June 2003 | King George VI & Queen Elizabeth Stakes | 12 | Ascot | 1 | 435 | 13/2 | 12 | 1 | 3.5 | 2:33.26 | Johnny Murtagh | John Oxx |
| 6 September 2003 | Irish Champion Stakes | 10 | Leopardstown | 1 | 382 | 5/4 | 7 | 4 | 2 | 2:03.30 | Johnny Murtagh | John Oxx |
| 18 October 2003 | Champion Stakes | 10 | Newmarket Rowley | 1 | 232 | 9/4 | 12 | 6 | 6.75 | 2:03.34 | Johnny Murtagh | John Oxx |

== Assessment ==
In the World Thoroughbred Racehorse Rankings for 2003, Alamshar was given a rating of 131 for his King George win, making him the third-best horse in the world behind Hawk Wing (134) and Dalakhani (132). He was named British Champion Three-Year-Old Colt in 2003 by the British Horseracing Board.

In 2008 the Aga Khan named his new super yacht "The Alamshar" in his horse's honour.

== Stud record ==
Alamshar began his stud career in Japan by standing at the Shizunai Stallion Station in 2004 and 2005. He then returned to Ireland when the JBBA leased him to the Irish National Stud for the next two seasons. He was sent back to Japan again in late 2007. He had little success as a stallion. and was retired from stud in 2017.

== Death ==
On August 20, 2026, Alamshar died at the age of 26 due to the infirmities of old age.

== Pedigree ==
Pedigree of Alamshar (IRE), bay stallion, 2000
| Sire Key of Luck (USA) 1991 | Chief's Crown; 1982 | Danzig | Northern Dancer |
| Sire Key of Luck (USA) 1991 | Chief's Crown; 1982 | Danzig | Pas de Nom |
| Sire Key of Luck (USA) 1991 | Chief's Crown; 1982 | Six Crowns | Secretariat |
| Sire Key of Luck (USA) 1991 | Chief's Crown; 1982 | Six Crowns | Chris Evert |
| Sire Key of Luck (USA) 1991 | Balbonella; 1984 | Gay Mecene | Vaguely Noble |
| Sire Key of Luck (USA) 1991 | Balbonella; 1984 | Gay Mecene | Gay Missile |
| Sire Key of Luck (USA) 1991 | Balbonella; 1984 | Bamieres | Riverman |
| Sire Key of Luck (USA) 1991 | Balbonella; 1984 | Bamieres | Bergamasque |
| Dam Alaiyda (USA) 1991 | Shahrastani; 1983 | Nijinsky | Northern Dancer |
| Dam Alaiyda (USA) 1991 | Shahrastani; 1983 | Nijinsky | Flaming Page |
| Dam Alaiyda (USA) 1991 | Shahrastani; 1983 | Shademah | Thatch |
| Dam Alaiyda (USA) 1991 | Shahrastani; 1983 | Shademah | Shamim |
| Dam Alaiyda (USA) 1991 | Aliysa; 1986 | Darshaan | Shirley Heights |
| Dam Alaiyda (USA) 1991 | Aliysa; 1986 | Darshaan | Delsy |
| Dam Alaiyda (USA) 1991 | Aliysa; 1986 | Alannya | Relko |
| Dam Alaiyda (USA) 1991 | Aliysa; 1986 | Alannya | Nucciolina (Family: 9-c) |
