= Rakti =

British-bred Thoroughbred racehorse

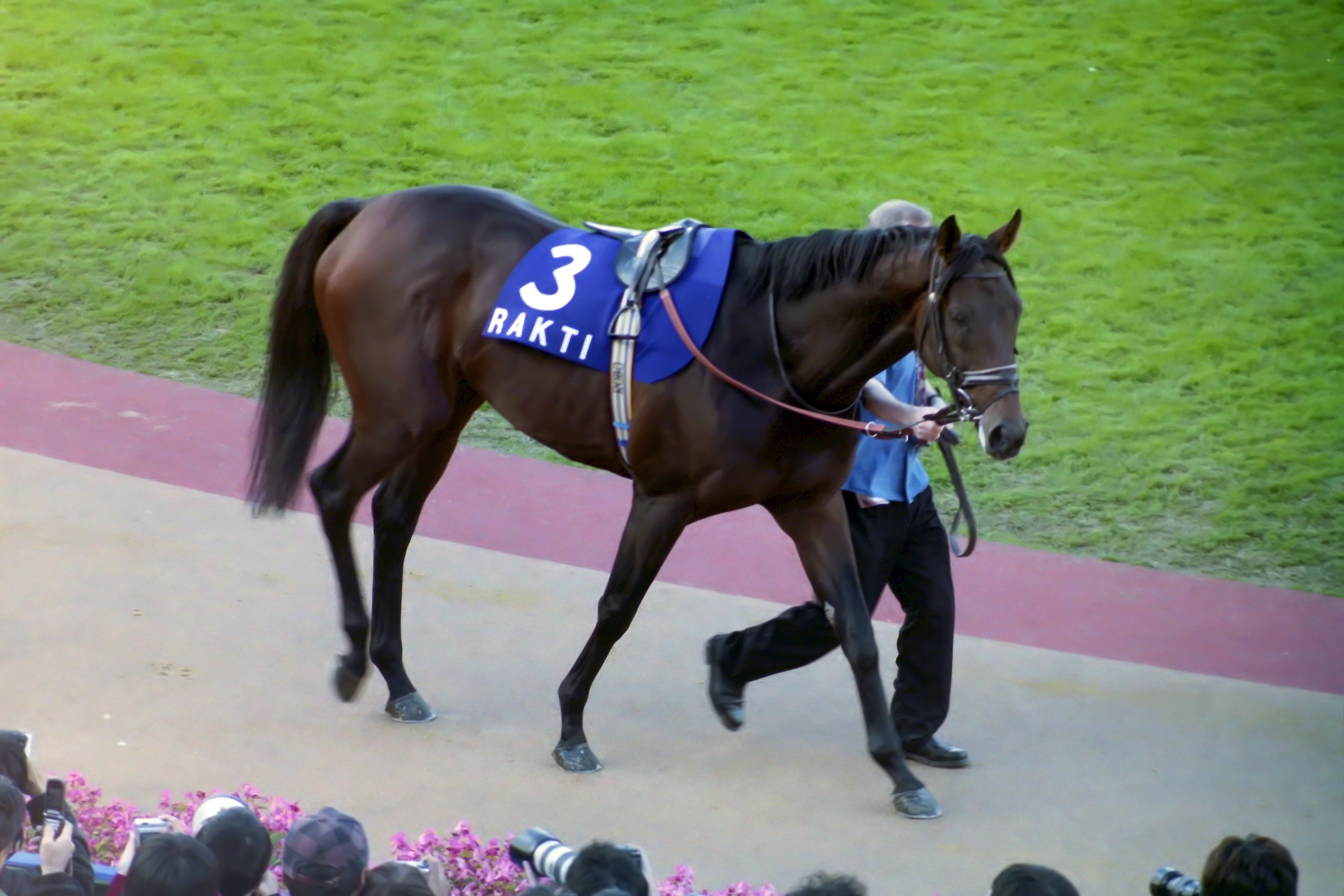
- Rakti at the Mile Championship (2004)
- Sire: Polish Precedent
- Grandsire: Danzig
- Dam: Ragera
- Damsire: Rainbow Quest
- Sex: Stallion
- Foaled: 1999
- Country: Great Britain
- Colour: Bay
- Breeder: Azienda Agricola Rosati Colarieti
- Owner: Scuderia Il Poggio; Gary A. Tanaka
- Trainer: Bruno Grizetti; Michael Jarvis
- Record: 26: 11-4-1
- Earnings: £1,870,762

Major wins
- Derby Italiano (2002); Premio Presidente della Repubblica (2003); Champion Stakes (2003); Prince of Wales's Stakes (2004); Queen Elizabeth II Stakes (2004); Lockinge Stakes (2005)

Awards
- World Champion Miler (2004)
- Last updated on June 22, 2007

Rakti (10 February 1999 – December 2010) was a British Thoroughbred racehorse, who won six Group One races in Italy (where he was originally trained) and the United Kingdom in a career which lasted from 2001 to 2005.

== Background ==
Rakti was bred in England by the Italian Azienda Agricola Rosati Colarieti. He was sired by the multiple group race winner Polish Precedent out of the Rainbow Quest mare Ragera. He was a big, powerful bay horse with an unpredictable and sometimes difficult temperament- his trainer saying of him, "He's a bully and he'll push you out of the box if he doesn't like the look of you".

Trained in Italy for his first two seasons, his greatest successes came after he was moved to England to be trained by Michael Jarvis. After his transfer he was ridden in all of his races by Philip Robinson.

== Racing career ==
=== 2001–2002: early career ===
Rakti began his career with two defeats in minor events at San Siro Racecourse, Milan in October 2001, before recording his first win at Pisa in November. He then won his next five races, including victory in the 2002 Derby Italiano, just prior to which he had been purchased by Gary Tanaka. Although he failed to win in his remaining three starts in Italy in 2002, he had been identified as a potential champion, and was relocated to the Newmarket stable of Michael Jarvis in March 2003.

=== 2003: four-year-old season ===
On his debut for his new connections he won the Premio Presidente della Repubblica by a neck from Tigertail. His Italian form was lightly regarded and he was sent off as a 50/1 outsider for English debut, but he belied his odds with a second place in Prince of Wales's Stakes.

After the race, Rakti was found to have sustained a hairline fracture to his ankle and was confined to his box for a month. He returned with a "consummately easy" win in the Champion Stakes, from a field which included Alamshar, Nayef and Russian Rhythm, leading Michael Jarvis to describe him as "certainly one of the best horses I've trained". On his final start of the year he finished second in the Hong Kong Cup to Falbrav, the world's top-rated horse at the distance.

=== 2004: five-year-old season ===
In 2004 he won the Prince of Wales's Stakes at Royal Ascot on his seasonal debut, beating Powerscourt and Sulamani with what The Independent's Richard Edmondson described as "a pulverising burst of speed". He was made 13/8 favourite for the Eclipse Stakes, but refused to settle for Philip Robinson, pulled hard from the start and then dropped from contention in the straight. "Seriously talented, seriously difficult", was Jarvis's comment.

After a fifth place in the Irish Champion Stakes he was dropped down in distance for the one mile Queen Elizabeth II Stakes at Ascot. Always running well, he looked "unstoppable" as went clear in the straight and stayed on to win by half a length from Lucky Story, with Soviet Song and Refuse To Bend well beaten. After the race Jarvis spoke of the difficulties of keeping Rakti controlled, comparing him to "an elastic band. You know he is going to snap". Jarvis also pointed out that the horse seemed to particularly enjoy racing at Ascot. Unfortunately for them, the racecourse was closed immediately afterwards for redevelopment, with the major races being rescheduled to other tracks for the next twenty months.

=== 2005: six-year-old season ===
Rakti began 2005 with a win in the Group One Lockinge Stakes at Newbury taking the lead after a furlong and pulling away to win by five lengths in a race record time of 1:33.59. Philip Robinson paid tribute to the horse describing him as "the best horse I’ve sat on – and I’ve been on some good ones". He was made odds-on favourite for the Queen Anne Stakes at "Royal Ascot" (actually held at York), but his temperament caused problems as he bolted on the way to the start- reportedly being startled by a woman making "clicking noises"- and was beaten in the race by the French colt Valixir.

In September, a 10% share in Rakti was sold to the Hong Kong Breeders Club, increasing the likelihood that he would compete in December's Hong Kong Mile. Rakti never recaptured his best form after York, with Jarvis becoming increasingly concerned by his horse's volatile temperament. In the Queen Elizabeth II Stakes, (run that year at Newmarket), he pulled hard and led early, before fading into fourth behind Starcraft. Speculation about a challenge for the Breeders' Cup Mile came to nothing and Rakti again failed to settle when finishing sixth to David Junior in the Champion Stakes. As expected, Rakti was sent to Sha Tin for his last race, where he ended his career by finishing eleventh of fifteen runners in the Hong Kong Mile. The horse behaved well before the race, but, according to Robinson, "he wasn't the same Rakti."

== Assessment ==
In the 2004 World Thoroughbred Racehorse Rankings Rakti was assessed at 123, making him the ninth best horse in the world and the best miler.

Rakti was given a Timeform rating of 129 in 2004 and 130 in 2005.

== Stud career ==
Rakti was retired to stand at the Irish National Stud beginning in 2006. He was later "shuttled" to stand in Australia, where he died at the Chatswood Stud, Victoria following an accident in December 2010. He made a "fair start" at stud, and sired a number of winners. His most notable offspring to date being 2013 Victoria Derby winner Polanski.

== Pedigree ==
Pedigree of Rakti (GB), bay stallion, 1999
Sire Polish Precedent (USA) 1986	Danzig; 1977	Northern Dancer	Nearctic
Sire Polish Precedent (USA) 1986	Danzig; 1977	Northern Dancer	Natalma
Sire Polish Precedent (USA) 1986	Danzig; 1977	Pas de Nom	Admirals Voyage
Sire Polish Precedent (USA) 1986	Danzig; 1977	Pas de Nom	Petitioner
Sire Polish Precedent (USA) 1986	Past Example; 1976	Buckpasser	Tom Fool
Sire Polish Precedent (USA) 1986	Past Example; 1976	Buckpasser	Busanda
Sire Polish Precedent (USA) 1986	Past Example; 1976	Bold Example	Bold Lad
Sire Polish Precedent (USA) 1986	Past Example; 1976	Bold Example	Lady Be Good
Dam Ragera (IRE) 1992	Rainbow Quest; 1981	Blushing Groom	Red God
Dam Ragera (IRE) 1992	Rainbow Quest; 1981	Blushing Groom	Runaway Bride
Dam Ragera (IRE) 1992	Rainbow Quest; 1981	I Will Follow	Herbager
Dam Ragera (IRE) 1992	Rainbow Quest; 1981	I Will Follow	Where You Lead
Dam Ragera (IRE) 1992	Smageta; 1979	High Top	Derring-Do
Dam Ragera (IRE) 1992	Smageta; 1979	High Top	Camenae
Dam Ragera (IRE) 1992	Smageta; 1979	Christine	Crocket
Dam Ragera (IRE) 1992	Smageta; 1979	Christine	Denning Report (Family: 22)
