= Dilshaan =

British Thoroughbred racehorse

- Sire: Darshaan
- Grandsire: Shirley Heights
- Dam: Avila
- Damsire: Ajdal
- Sex: Stallion
- Foaled: 22 February 1998
- Country: United Kingdom
- Colour: Bay
- Breeder: Saeed Manana
- Owner: Saeed Suhail
- Trainer: Michael Stoute
- Record: 4: 2-1-0
- Earnings: £190,612

Major wins
- Racing Post Trophy (2000); Dante Stakes (2001)

Dilshaan (foaled 22 February 1998) is a British Thoroughbred racehorse and sire. In a brief racing career he won two of his four races between September 2000 and June 2001. After finishing second in a minor race on his racecourse debut he was moved up in class to record an upset victory in the Group One Racing Post Trophy in October. In the following spring he returned from absence of more than six months to establish himself as a major contender for The Derby with a win in the Dante Stakes. He ran poorly in the Derby and his racing career was subsequently ended by injury. He has been a success as a breeding stallion siring various event horses who are now coming through with successful results.

== Background ==
Dilshaan is a bay horse with no white markings bred in the United Kingdom by Saeed Manana. He was sired by Darshaan who won the Prix du Jockey Club for the Aga Khan in 1984 before becoming a successful breeding stallion. The best of his other offspring included Dalakhani, Mark of Esteem and Kotashaan. Dilshaan's dam Avila showed little ability as a racehorse, failing to win in two races as a three-year-old in 1992. Avila's grandmother Sweet Mimosa won the Prix de Diane and was a full-sister to both Levmoss and Le Moss.

In October 1999 the yearling was offered for sale at Tattersalls and was bought for 190,000 guineas by the bloodstock agent Charlie Gordon-Watson. He entered the ownership of Saeed Suhail and was sent into training with Michael Stoute at Newmarket.

== Racing career ==
=== 2000: two-year-old season ===
Dilshaan made his debut in a Novice race (for horses with no more than one previous win) over seven furlongs at Sandown Park Racecourse on 13 September 2000. Ridden by the veteran Pat Eddery in a five-runner field he started 7/2 third choice in the betting behind Attache and Gleaming Blade, both of whom had already won maiden races. He was slightly hampered when Gleaming Blade hung to the left in the last quarter mile but recovered to finish second, a length and a half behind Attache. Despite his defeat, the colt was then moved up sharply in class for the Group One Racing Post Trophy at Doncaster Racecourse on 21 October. He was ridden by Johnny Murtagh and started a 14/1 outsider in a field of ten juvenile colts. The Aidan O'Brien-trained Freud was made favourite, whilst the other contenders included Tamburlaine, Grandera, CD Europe (Coventry Stakes), Darwin, Bonnard (runner-up in the Futurity Stakes) and Dayglow Dancer (runner-up in the Prix de Condé). Dilshaan started slowly and Murtagh restrained him at the rear of the field before switching to the outside and beginning to make progress in the straight. Tamburlaine opened up a clear advantage in the last quarter mile, but Dilshaan continued to make ground, gained the advantage 100 yards from the finish and drew away to win by two and a half lengths. Bonnard was three quarters of a length behind Tamburlaine in third, five lengths clear of Darwin in fourth. Stoute responded to the colt's win by saying "I certainly wasn't confident he'd win but he was entitled to run well. He's done it really nicely and is a horse with a lot of scope. He's an interesting prospect and will need to go further than a mile next season".

=== 2001: three-year-old season ===
Dilshaan began his second season in the Dante Stakes (a major trial race for the Epsom Derby) over ten and a half furlongs at York Racecourse on 16 May. He was made the 9/4 favourite against five opponents including Celtic Silence (Chesham Stakes), Olden Times (Feilden Stakes), Storming Home and Rosi's Boy (Newmarket Stakes). Ridden by Kieren Fallon he tracked the leaders as Celtic Silence set the pace before moving up to make his challenge two furlongs out. Dilshaan took the lead approaching the final furlong and stayed on well in the closing stages to win by half a length and a neck from Celtic Silence and Storming Home. The colt's success meant that Michael Stoute had two leading contenders for the Derby, having won the 2000 Guineas with Golan. The trainer commented "It was a good solid performance... I am delighted he has won and I feel he will make further progress... He's a very placid, likeable colt". Fallon said of the winner "I've always liked this fellow. The other morning I rode him in work and he was impressive. I thought he would come home alone here. He's gone to the front and done nothing... he was idling". The leading bookmakers responded by making him third favourite in the ante-post betting market for the Derby.

In the 2001 Epsom Derby on 9 June Dilshaan, ridden by Murtagh started the 5/1 fourth favourite behind Galileo, Golan and the Lingfield Derby Trial winner Perfect Sunday. After turning into the straight in fifth place he made no further progress and finished seventh of the twelve runners behind Galileo.

Dilshaan sustained a joint injury shortly after the Derby and missed the rest of the season. He remained in training as a four-year-old but suffered a recurrence of his previous injury and his retirement was announced in July 2002.

== Stud record ==
Dilshaan was retired from racing to become a breeding stallion. He was based at the Tara Stud in County Meath before moving to the Park House Stud in County Carlow in 2011. He has sired several minor winners but has made little impact.

== Pedigree ==
Pedigree of Dilshaan (GB), bay stallion, 1998
Sire Darshaan (GB) 1981	Shirley Heights (GB); 1975	Mill Reef	Never Bend
Sire Darshaan (GB) 1981	Shirley Heights (GB); 1975	Mill Reef	Milan Mill
Sire Darshaan (GB) 1981	Shirley Heights (GB); 1975	Hardiemma	Hardicanute
Sire Darshaan (GB) 1981	Shirley Heights (GB); 1975	Hardiemma	Grand Cross
Sire Darshaan (GB) 1981	Delsy (FR); 1972	Abdos	Arbar
Sire Darshaan (GB) 1981	Delsy (FR); 1972	Abdos	Pretty Lady
Sire Darshaan (GB) 1981	Delsy (FR); 1972	Kelty	Venture VII
Sire Darshaan (GB) 1981	Delsy (FR); 1972	Kelty	Marilla
Dam Avila (GB) 1989	Ajdal (USA); 1984	Northern Dancer	Nearctic
Dam Avila (GB) 1989	Ajdal (USA); 1984	Northern Dancer	Natalma
Dam Avila (GB) 1989	Ajdal (USA); 1984	Native Partner	Raise a Native
Dam Avila (GB) 1989	Ajdal (USA); 1984	Native Partner	Dinner Partner
Dam Avila (GB) 1989	Sweet Habit (IRE); 1976	Habitat (horse)	Sir Gaylord
Dam Avila (GB) 1989	Sweet Habit (IRE); 1976	Habitat (horse)	Little Hut
Dam Avila (GB) 1989	Sweet Habit (IRE); 1976	Sweet Mimosa	Le Levanstell
Dam Avila (GB) 1989	Sweet Habit (IRE); 1976	Sweet Mimosa	Feemoss (Family: 1-k)
