= Soviet Song =

Irish-bred Thoroughbred racehorse

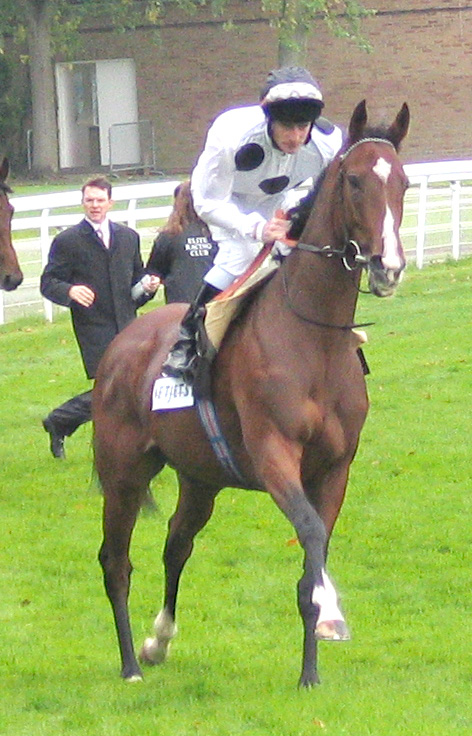
- Soviet Song in 2004
- Sire: Marju
- Grandsire: Last Tycoon
- Dam: Kalinka
- Damsire: Soviet Star
- Sex: Mare
- Foaled: 18 February 2000
- Country: Ireland
- Colour: Bay
- Breeder: Elite Racing Club
- Owner: Elite Racing Club
- Trainer: James Fanshawe
- Record: 24:9-6-2
- Earnings: £1,168,370

Major wins
- Fillies' Mile (2002); Ridgewood Pearl Stakes (2004); Falmouth Stakes (2004, 2005); Sussex Stakes (2004); Matron Stakes (2004); Windsor Forest Stakes (2006)

Awards
- Racehorse Owners Association/Racing Post Award for Outstanding Older Horse (2004); BHB Champion Older Female Flat Horse (2004); European Champion Older Horse (2004); BHB Champion Older Female Flat Horse (2005)

Honours
- Highest rated older filly in the World (2004); Joint highest rated older filly in the World (2005)
- Last updated on 12 March 2007

Soviet Song (18 February 2000 – 16 November 2015) was a racehorse bred and owned by Elite Racing Club. She was foaled on 18 February 2000, sired by Marju (IRE) out of Kalinka (IRE) (Soviet Star). She raced in England, Ireland and France during her career and she was the highest rated older filly in the World in 2004 and 2005.

== Racing career ==
Soviet Song was trained at Newmarket by James Fanshawe during her 24 race career and she was ridden by only three jockeys, Oscar Urbina, Johnny Murtagh and Jamie Spencer.

Out of her 24 races on the flat over five years, she won 9 races with win prize money of £789,630, also finishing second 6 times and third 2 times, her total prize money during her racing career was £1,168,370. During her career she often had problems with her feet which resulted in her wearing stick-on horse shoes for some races. She won five Group One races altogether and never once finished out of the prize money.

Her stable name is Sovie and she is a half-sister to Penzance, who won the Triumph Hurdle at the Cheltenham Festival in 2005.

=== Two Year Old Season ===
She was ridden by Oscar Urbina for her two-year-old career in 2002 when she was unbeaten. Her first race as a two-year-old was on 17 July 2002 at Kempton Park Racecourse in the 6 furlong EBF Maiden Fillies' Stakes on good to firm ground. With a poor low draw and after missing the start she was slowly away, she dwelt in the rear but made good progress over 3f out. She led the race over 1f out, pressed inside the final furlong by the favourite Airwave (a future Group One winning horse), she ran on well to win by half a length at 6/1.

She stepped up in class for her next outing, the Listed Sweet Solera Stakes at Newmarket Racecourse. On 10 August 2002 she won the 7 furlong race by an impressive three lengths on very soft ground. Sent off at 4/1 second favourite, the race was run in a downpour and she was held up in the rear of the field, making headway over 1f out, she pulled right away inside the final furlong and quickened clear of the rest of the horses which included Summitville who would go on to be third in The Oaks the following season.

She ended the season by winning her first Group One race in the Fillies' Mile at Ascot. The race took place on 28 September 2002 on good to firm ground, and sent off the 11/10 favourite she was held up in touch, switching left and then making steady headway 2 furlongs out. She led inside the final furlong and won the one mile race comfortably, beating the next season's Epsom Oaks winner Casual Look into second place by one and a half lengths. After winning this race Soviet Song was installed as favourite for the 2003 1,000 Guineas classic race by bookmakers.

=== Three Year Old Season ===
She did not win as a three-year-old but ran some excellent races in defeat. On 4 May 2003 she ran – despite an interrupted preparation – in the first fillies-only Classic race of the season, the 1,000 Guineas at Newmarket. Ridden again by Oscar Urbina on good to firm ground, she travelled strongly in the race, being held up, she came through 2 furlongs out before her effort flattened out up the hill and she could not find any extra inside the final furlong. She was beaten into fourth place by the eventual winner Russian Rhythm, with the future Breeders' Cup Mile winner Six Perfections in second place together with the future Breeders' Cup Filly & Mare Turf winner Intercontinental back in third place.

=== Four Year Old Season ===
2004 was her best season with four wins, three in Group One races including the Sussex Stakes at Goodwood against the colts. She also won the Falmouth Stakes at the Newmarket July meeting showing a brilliant turn of foot, with 2004's hitherto-unbeaten One Thousand Guineas winner Attraction in second place.

=== Five Year Old Season ===
Illness cut short her five-year-old season but she still won her second Group One Falmouth Stakes.

=== Six Year Old Season ===
Her last racing season during 2006 produced a win in the Group Two Windsor Forest Stakes at Ascot.

== Awards and honours ==
- Racehorse Owners Association/Racing Post Award for Outstanding Older Horse (2004)
- BHB Champion Older Female Flat Horse (2004)
- Cartier Award for Top Older Horse (2004)
- Highest rated older filly in the World (2004)
- BHB Champion Older Female Flat Horse (2005)
- Joint highest rated older filly in the World (2005) along with Alexander Goldrun and Pride.

== Retirement ==
It was announced on 9 October 2006 that Soviet Song had run her last race and she was being retired to Kirtlington Stud in Oxfordshire to spearhead Elite Racing Club's highly successful breeding programme. Although she failed to get in foal in 2007 despite being covered by two different stallions, in 2008 she was scanned in foal to promising young stallion Oasis Dream. Her first foal, a colt, was born on 28 January 2009, and named Soviet Dream. Further attempts between 2009 and 2011 to get her in foal were unsuccessful and she was based in the United States for treatment before the 2012 breeding season. She foaled a filly by Speightstown on 6 February 2014. She was euthanised on 16 November 2015 at Oak Lodge Stud in Kentucky.

== Race record ==
2002 Season as a 2 Year Old
Date	Racecourse	Distance	Race Status	Race	Position	Winning Distance (lengths)	Jockey	Rating	Going	Odds	Prize money
17 July 2002	Kempton Park	6f	–	EBF Maiden Fillies' Stakes	1st	½	Oscar Urbina	–	Good to Firm	6/1	£4,446
10 August 2002	Newmarket	7f	Listed	Sweet Solera Stakes	1st	3	Oscar Urbina	–	Soft	4/1	£13,595.20
28 September 2002	Ascot	8f	Group 1	Fillies' Mile	1st	1½	Oscar Urbina	–	Good to Firm	11/10F	£116,000

2003 Season as a 3 Year Old
Date	Racecourse	Distance	Race Status	Race	Position	Winning Distance (lengths)	Jockey	Rating	Going	Odds	Prize money
4 May 2003	Newmarket	8f	Group 1	1,000 Guineas	4th to Russian Rhythm	–	Oscar Urbina	114	Good to Firm	4/1	£16,000
20 June 2003	Royal Ascot	8f	Group 1	Coronation Stakes	2nd to Russian Rhythm	–	Oscar Urbina	114	Good to Firm	9/2	£59,400
7 September 2003	Longchamp	8f	Group 1	Prix du Moulin	4th to Nebraska Tornado	–	Oscar Urbina	–	Good to Soft	164/10	£11,123
27 September 2003	Ascot	8f	Group 1	QEII Stakes	5th to Falbrav	–	Jamie Spencer	117	Good to Firm	8/1	£8,125

2004 Season as a 4 Year Old
Date	Racecourse	Distance	Race Status	Race	Position	Winning Distance (lengths)	Jockey	Rating	Going	Odds	Prize money
10 April 2004	Kempton Park	8f	Listed	Snowdrop Fillies Stakes	2nd to Beneventa	–	Johnny Murtagh	114	Good to Soft	4/11F	£6,600
24 April 2004	Sandown Park	8f	Group 2	Betfred Mile	3rd to Hurricane Alan	–	Johnny Murtagh	114	Good to Soft	5/2F	£11,000
22 May 2004	Curragh	8f	Group 2	Ridgewood Pearl Stakes	1st	6	Johnny Murtagh	–	Good to Firm	11/10F	£56,760.56
15 June 2004	Royal Ascot	8f	Group 1	Queen Anne Stakes	2nd to Refuse to Bend	–	Johnny Murtagh	114	Good to Firm	6/1	£55,000
6 July 2004	Newmarket	8f	Group 1	Falmouth Stakes	1st	2½	Johnny Murtagh	114	Good to Firm	11/4	£116,000
28 July 2004	Goodwood	8f	Group 1	Sussex Stakes	1st	nk	Johnny Murtagh	115	Good	3/1	£174,000
11 September 2004	Leopardstown	8f	Group 1	Matron Stakes	1st	½	Johnny Murtagh	–	Good to Firm	8/13F	£119,014.08
25 September 2004	Ascot	8f	Group 1	QEII Stakes	6th to Rakti	–	Johnny Murtagh	120	Good to Firm	5/2F	£3,750

2005 Season as a 5 Year Old
Date	Racecourse	Distance	Race Status	Race	Position	Winning Distance (lengths)	Jockey	Rating	Going	Odds	Prize money
15 June 2005	Royal Ascot at York	8f	Group 2	Windsor Forest Stakes	3rd to Peeress	–	Johnny Murtagh	119	Good to Firm	5/2	£14,300
5 July 2005	Newmarket	8f	Group 1	Falmouth Stakes	1st	2½	Johnny Murtagh	119	Good	7/4F	£116,000
27 July 2005	Goodwood	8f	Group 1	Sussex Stakes	2nd to Proclamation	–	Johnny Murtagh	119	Soft	2/1F	£66,000

2006 Season as a 6 Year Old
Date	Racecourse	Distance	Race Status	Race	Position	Winning Distance (lengths)	Jockey	Rating	Going	Odds	Prize money
20 May 2006	Newbury	8f	Group 1	Lockinge Stakes	4th to Peeress	–	Jamie Spencer	119	Soft	7/2F	£10,740
21 June 2006	Royal Ascot	8f	Group 2	Windsor Forest Stakes	1st	2	Jamie Spencer	119	Good to Firm	11/8F	£73,814
12 July 2006	Newmarket	8f	Group 1	Falmouth Stakes	6th to Rajeem	–	Jamie Spencer	119	Good to Firm	6/5F	£2,700
2 August 2006	Goodwood	8f	Group 1	Sussex Stakes	2nd to Court Masterpiece	–	Johnny Murtagh	119	Good to Firm	11/2	£68,272.19
27 August 2006	Goodwood	8f	Group 2	Celebration Mile	5th to Caradak	–	Jamie Spencer	115	Good	11/2	£2,690
30 September 2006	Newmarket	8f	Group 1	Sun Chariot Stakes	2nd to Spinning Queen	–	Oscar Urbina	113	Good to Soft	9/2	£43,040

=== Prize money ===
Prize money earned by season
Season	Prize money
2002	£134,041.20
2003	£94,648
2004	£542,124.64
2005	£196,300
2006	£201,256.19
Total Prize Money	£1,168,370.03

== Pedigree ==
Pedigree of Soviet Song
Sire Marju	Last Tycoon	Try My Best	Northern Dancer
Sire Marju	Last Tycoon	Try My Best	Sex Appeal
Sire Marju	Last Tycoon	Mill Princess	Mill Reef
Sire Marju	Last Tycoon	Mill Princess	Irish Lass II
Sire Marju	Flame of Tara	Artaius	Round Table
Sire Marju	Flame of Tara	Artaius	Stylish Pattern
Sire Marju	Flame of Tara	Welsh Flame	Welsh Pageant
Sire Marju	Flame of Tara	Welsh Flame	Electric Flash
Dam Kalinka	Soviet Star	Nureyev	Northern Dancer
Dam Kalinka	Soviet Star	Nureyev	Special
Dam Kalinka	Soviet Star	Veruschka	Venture
Dam Kalinka	Soviet Star	Veruschka	Marie D'Anjou
Dam Kalinka	Tralthee	Tromos	Busted
Dam Kalinka	Tralthee	Tromos	Stilvi
Dam Kalinka	Tralthee	Swalthee	Sword Dancer
Dam Kalinka	Tralthee	Swalthee	Amalthee
