= 1751 to 1755 in sports =

Events in world sport through the years 1751 to 1755.

== Boxing ==
Events

- 1751 — George Taylor retired from the ring and became the landlord of the Fountain Inn in Deptford.
- 29 July 1751 or 1754, depending on source — English champion Jack Slack successfully defended his title against Monsieur Petit, winning in the 7th round after 25 minutes at Harlston.
- 13 March 1755 — Jack Slack v Cornelius Harris in Bristol. Slack won in round five after twenty minutes.

== Cricket ==
Events

- 1751 — Earliest known references to cricket being played in each of Durham, Somerset, Warwickshire and Yorkshire.
- 7 & 8 August 1753 — Hambledon v Surrey is the earliest known match on Broadhalfpenny Down, Hambledon winning by 113 runs (discovered in the Salisbury Journal in 2011).
- 1754 — The Leeds Intelligencer, forerunner of the Yorkshire Post, began publication; it has always been a noted source for cricket in Yorkshire.
- June 1755 — two matches between Cambridge University and an Eton College team held in Cambridge, the university winning both.

== Horse racing ==
Events

- Having been founded in 1750, the Jockey Club began to establish rules for British racing; it remained the governing body of the sport until 1993 when it handed over control to the new British Horseracing Board.
- 1752 — The first recorded steeplechase was held in County Cork over a distance of 4.5 miles between the towns of Buttevant and Doneraile, the name of this type of race being derived from the practice of racing the horses across country by going from church steeple to church steeple.

== Sources ==
- Buckley, G. B. (1935). Fresh Light on 18th Century Cricket. Cotterell.
- Maun, Ian (2011). From Commons to Lord's, Volume Two: 1751 to 1770. Martin Wilson. ISBN 978-0-9569066-0-1.
