= Falbrav =

Irish-bred Thoroughbred racehorse (1998–2024)

- Sire: Fairy King
- Grandsire: Northern Dancer
- Dam: Gift Of The Night
- Damsire: Slewpy
- Sex: Male (Stallion)
- Foaled: 28 February 1998
- Died: 12 January 2024 (aged 25)
- Country: Ireland
- Colour: Bay
- Breeder: Azienda Agricola Francesca
- Owner: Scuderia Rencati & Teruya Yoshida
- Trainer: Luciano D'Auria; Luca Cumani
- Record: 26: 13-5-5
- Earnings: 5,825,517

Major wins
- Premio Presidente della Repubblica (2002); Gran Premio di Milano (2002); Japan Cup (2002); Prix d'Ispahan (2003); Eclipse Stakes (2003); Juddmonte International Stakes (2003); Queen Elizabeth II Stakes (2003); Hong Kong Cup (2003)

Awards
- European Champion Older Horse (2003); BHB Horse of the Year (2003); Timeform Horse of the Year (2003); BHB Middle Distance Championship (2003)
- Last updated on October 3, 2006

Falbrav (28 February 1998 – 12 January 2024) was a Thoroughbred racehorse and sire, bred in Ireland but trained in Italy and the United Kingdom during his racing career which ran from 2000 to 2003. He is notable for having won Group 1/Grade I races in five countries: the Premio Presidente della Repubblica and the Gran Premio di Milano in Italy; the Japan Cup in Japan; the Prix d'Ispahan in France; the Eclipse Stakes, the Juddmonte International Stakes and the Queen Elizabeth II Stakes in the United Kingdom and the Hong Kong Cup in Hong Kong.

== Background ==
Falbrav, a "massive, bull-like" bay horse with three white feet and a small star, was bred in Ireland by the Italian breeder Azienda Agricola Francesca. He was from one of the last groups of foals sired by the Northern Dancer stallion Fairy King out of the Slewpy mare Gift of the Night. Apart from Falbrav, Fairy King, who died in 1999, sired the winners of over 500 races, including Helissio (Prix de l'Arc de Triomphe) and Oath (Derby).

Falbrav was first put into training with Luciano D'Auria at Bellinzago Lombardo in Italy, but was moved to the English stable of Luca Cumani in early 2003.

"Falbrav" is a Milanese dialect word meaning "be good".

== Racing career ==
=== 2000: two-year-old season ===
Falbrav won a maiden race at San Siro Racecourse, Milan on his racecourse debut in September 2000. He was placed in three other races that autumn, most notably the Group 2 Premio Guido Berardelli in which he finished a neck second to Mistero.

=== 2001: three-year-old season ===
Racing exclusively at the San Siro and Capanelle racecourses, Falbrav won three times from six starts in 2001. His most significant performance, however, came in defeat, when finishing second to Morshdi in the Group One Derby Italiano. His end of season rating of 113 made him the best three-year-old in Italy, but placed him sixteen pounds below the European champion Galileo, suggesting that he would struggle against top class international competition.

=== 2002: four-year-old season ===
Falbrav won another minor event on his four-year-old debut. From that point on, he began to show vastly improved form. In May he won the Group 1 Premio Presidente della Repubblica, taking the lead a furlong from home and beating the odds-on Godolphin colt Ekraar by one and a quarter lengths. A month later, Falbrav again defeated a Godolphin challenger, winning the Gran Premio di Milano by three lengths from Narrative.

Falbrav was then aimed at the Prix de l'Arc de Triomphe and ran third in the Prix Foy. Although Falbrav's challenge provoked interest and enthusiasm in Italy he appeared to have his limitations exposed when finishing ninth behind Marienbard in the French classic.

In the Japan Cup in November, however, he led inside the final furlong and stayed on strongly to hold off Sarafan and Symboli Kris S in a photo-finish. The rest of the field included such major winners as Golan, Storming Home, Indigenous, Bright Sky and Jungle Pocket. The race was a rough one, and Falbrav's win was confirmed only after an objection from the connections of the runner-up who claimed that a collision in the closing stages had cost their horse the race. According to Sarafan's rider, "Falbrav bumped me...I'm not happy or satisfied at all."

=== 2003: five-year-old season ===
==== Spring ====
After the Japan Cup, Falbrav's owners, Scuderia Rencati, sold a half share in the horse to Teruya Yoshida. For his five-year-old season, Falbrav was transferred to the Newmarket stable of Luca Cumani following a reported disagreement between the horse's owners and Luciano D'Auria. Cumani was impressed by Falbrav, saying that he looked "a million dollars", but early plans were flexible, with the owners undecided about whether to campaign the horse in Europe or Japan.

Falbrav began the year in France, finishing third in the Prix Ganay before beating Bright Sky in the Prix d'Ispahan. Cumani was not particularly enthusiastic about the win, but pointed out that he had been concerned by the soft ground, which did not suit Falbrav.

==== Summer ====
In the summer, Falbrav raced in his new home country. He finished fifth behind Nayef in the Prince of Wales's Stakes at Royal Ascot but then reversed the form in the Eclipse Stakes, winning by three-quarters of a length after breaking clear of the field a furlong out. Cumani felt that the horse had been forced to take the lead earlier than was ideal but was keen to praise him, describing him "full of confidence and power" and comparing him to "a heavyweight boxer." Others were more sceptical, pointing out that the fast-finishing runner-up had been unable to find a clear run in the closing stages. He returned to Ascot for the one and a half mile King George VI and Queen Elizabeth Stakes, where he raced prominently before weakening into fifth place behind Alamshar.

In the International Stakes at York he produced what the Telegraph's described as his "key weapon... a decisive turn of foot" to go four lengths clear two furlongs from the finish, before running on to record a two-length win, increasing his Sandown superiority over Nayef, who finished third. Cumani's assessment of Falbrav reached even greater heights after the race, as he called Falbrav "amazing, a machine... one of the best horses I have ever trained" The win also earned Falbrav's owners a £250,000 bonus for winning the Middle Distance Championship series from the British Horseracing Board.

==== Autumn ====
Falbrav next travelled to Leopardstown for the Irish Champion Stakes, in which he "just failed" to catch High Chaparral, having struggled to find space to run in a rough race. After the race, Falbrav's connections launched an unsuccessful appeal to have the result overturned, on the grounds that High Chaparral should have been disqualified. He then proved his versatility by moving down to the one-mile distance and beating the 1,000 Guineas winner Russian Rhythm in the Queen Elizabeth II Stakes at Ascot, recording the second fastest time in the race's history. After the race, his trainer reportedly offered to present four crates of champagne to anyone who could persuade Falbrav's owners to keep their horse in training for another year.

Falbrav's owners then paid a supplementary charge of $180,000 to run him in the Breeders' Cup at Santa Anita where Cumani opted for the Turf after seriously considering a run in the Classic. He led a furlong from home before losing out in a three way photo-finish, a head behind the dead-heaters High Chaparral and Johar.

On his final racecourse appearance, Falbrav beat Rakti by two lengths in the Hong Kong Cup at Sha Tin Racecourse. Frankie Dettori said of the run, "That was electric... He just flew. He took my breath away", after Falbrav's acceleration had settled the result a furlong from the finish.

== Assessment ==
Falbrav won the 2003 Cartier Racing Award for Champion European older horse.

In the International Classification for the same year, Falbrav was rated on 127, six pounds behind Hawk Wing. Although this rating made him the fourth best horse in the world, some commentators claimed that he had been unfairly under-rated. The argument was centred on the fact that Hawk Wing's rating was based on one performance (in the Lockinge Stakes), whereas Falbrav had raced at a consistently high standard from April to December.

The same arguments, in reverse, were aired when Falbrav was awarded the title of BHB Horse of the Year.

Although they also gave Hawk Wing a higher rating, Timeform named Falbrav their "Horse of the Year". In awarding him a rating of 133 they observed,

His remarkable campaign in 2003 established him as one of the toughest, soundest and most versatile top horses of the modern era

== Stud career ==
Falbrav operated as a "shuttle" stallion, standing at the Shadai Stallion Station in Hokkaido, Japan in the early part of the year before moving to Australia for the Southern Hemisphere breeding season where he stood at the Arrowfield Stud at Scone, New South Wales.

Falbrav made a "good start" at stud, producing winners like Fanunalter (Diomed Stakes), Fravashi (QTC Sires Produce Stakes), Distant Memories (Winter Hill Stakes), Brava Fortune (Karrakatta Plate) and One Carat (Hakodate Sprint Stakes).

== Death ==
Falbrav died in Japan on 12 January 2024, at the age of 25. He had been suffering from colic, and had been feeling unwell since the end of 2023.

== Pedigree ==
Pedigree of Falbrav (IRE), bay stallion, 1998
Sire Fairy King (USA) 1982	Northern Dancer; 1961	Nearctic	Nearco
Sire Fairy King (USA) 1982	Northern Dancer; 1961	Nearctic	Lady Angela
Sire Fairy King (USA) 1982	Northern Dancer; 1961	Natalma	Native Dancer
Sire Fairy King (USA) 1982	Northern Dancer; 1961	Natalma	Almahmoud
Sire Fairy King (USA) 1982	Fairy Bridge; 1975	Bold Reason	Hail To Reason
Sire Fairy King (USA) 1982	Fairy Bridge; 1975	Bold Reason	Lalun
Sire Fairy King (USA) 1982	Fairy Bridge; 1975	Special	Forli
Sire Fairy King (USA) 1982	Fairy Bridge; 1975	Special	Thong
Dam Gift of the Night (USA) 1990	Slewpy; 1980	Seattle Slew	Bold Reasoning
Dam Gift of the Night (USA) 1990	Slewpy; 1980	Seattle Slew	My Charmer
Dam Gift of the Night (USA) 1990	Slewpy; 1980	Rare Bouquet	Prince John
Dam Gift of the Night (USA) 1990	Slewpy; 1980	Rare Bouquet	Forest Song
Dam Gift of the Night (USA) 1990	Little Nana; 1975	Lithiot	Ribot
Dam Gift of the Night (USA) 1990	Little Nana; 1975	Lithiot	Lithia
Dam Gift of the Night (USA) 1990	Little Nana; 1975	Nenana Road	Kirkland Lake
Dam Gift of the Night (USA) 1990	Little Nana; 1975	Nenana Road	Sena (Family: 4-i)
