= Cartier Champion Older Horse =

Award in European horse racing

The Cartier Champion Older Horse is an award in European horse racing, founded in 1991, and sponsored by Cartier SA as part of the Cartier Racing Awards. The award winner is decided by points earned in group races plus the votes cast by British racing journalists and readers of the Racing Post and The Daily Telegraph newspapers.

== Records ==
Most successful horse (2 wins):

- Goldikova – 2009, 2010
- Enable - 2018, 2019

Leading trainer (5 wins):

- Saeed bin Suroor – Halling (1996), Swain (1998), Daylami (1999), Fantastic Light (2001), Grandera (2002)

Leading owner (5 wins):

- Godolphin – Halling (1996), Swain (1998), Daylami (1999), Fantastic Light (2001), Grandera (2002)

=== Winners ===
Year	Horse	Age	Gender	Bred	Trained	Trainer	Owner
1991	Terimon	5	H	GB	GB	Lady Beaverbrook	Clive Brittain
1992	Mr Brooks	5	H	GB	GB	Richard Hannon, Sr.	Paul Green
1993	Opera House	5	H	GB	GB	Michael Stoute	Sheikh Mohammed
1994	Barathea	4	C	IRE	GB	Luca Cumani	Sheikh Mohammed
1995	Further Flight	9	G	IRE	GB	Barry Hills	Simon Wingfield Digby
1996	Halling	5	H	USA	GB	Saeed bin Suroor	Godolphin
1997	Pilsudski	5	H	IRE	GB	Michael Stoute	Arnold Weinstock
1998	Swain	6	H	IRE	GB	Saeed bin Suroor	Godolphin
1999	Daylami	5	H	IRE	GB	Saeed bin Suroor	Godolphin
2000	Kalanisi	4	C	IRE	GB	Michael Stoute	Aga Khan IV
2001	Fantastic Light	5	H	USA	GB	Saeed bin Suroor	Godolphin
2002	Grandera	4	C	IRE	GB	Saeed bin Suroor	Godolphin
2003	Falbrav	5	H	IRE	GB	Luca Cumani	Scuderia Rencati & Teruya Yoshida
2004	Soviet Song	4	F	IRE	GB	James Fanshawe	Elite Racing Club
2005	Azamour	4	C	IRE	IRE	John Oxx	Aga Khan
2006	Ouija Board	5	M	GB	GB	Ed Dunlop	Edward Stanley, 19th Earl of Derby
2007	Dylan Thomas	4	C	IRE	IRE	Aidan O'Brien	Sue Magnier and Michael Tabor
2008	Duke of Marmalade	4	C	IRE	IRE	Aidan O'Brien	Sue Magnier and Michael Tabor
2009	Goldikova	4	F	IRE	FR	Freddy Head	Wertheimer et Frère
2010	Goldikova	5	M	IRE	FR	Freddy Head	Wertheimer et Frère
2011	Cirrus des Aigles	5	G	FR	FR	Corine Barande-Barbe	Jean-Claude-Alain Dupouy
2012	Frankel	4	C	GB	GB	Henry Cecil	Khalid Abdullah
2013	Moonlight Cloud	5	M	GB	FR	Freddy Head	George Strawbridge
2014	Noble Mission	5	H	GB	GB	Jane Cecil	Khalid Abdullah
2015	Solow	5	G	GB	FR	Freddy Head	Wertheimer et Frère
2016	Found	4	F	IRE	IRE	Aidan O'Brien	Magnier, Smith and Tabor
2017	Ulysses	4	C	IRE	GB	Michael Stoute	Flaxman Stables
2018	Enable	4	F	GB	GB	John Gosden	Khalid Abdullah
2019	Enable	5	M	GB	GB	John Gosden	Khalid Abdullah
2020	Ghaiyyath	5	H	IRE	GB	Charlie Appleby	Godolphin
2021	Palace Pier	4	C	GB	GB	John & Thady Gosden	Hamdan bin Mohammed Al Maktoum
2022	Baaeed	4	C	GB	GB	William Haggas	Shadwell Estate
2023	Mostahdaf	5	H	IRE	GB	John & Thady Gosden	Shadwell Estate
2024	Charyn	4	C	IRE	GB	Roger Varian	Nurlan Bizakov
2025	Calandagan	4	G	IRE	FR	Francis-Henri Graffard	Aga Khan Studs SCEA
2026	Ombudsman	5	H	IRE	IRE	John & Thady Gosden	Godolphin
