= Grandera =

Irish-bred Thoroughbred racehorse

- Racing colours of Godolphin
- Sire: Grand Lodge
- Grandsire: Chief's Crown
- Dam: Bordighera
- Damsire: Alysheba
- Sex: Stallion
- Foaled: 1998
- Country: Ireland
- Colour: Chestnut
- Breeder: J Stan Cosgrove
- Owner: Mrs V Shelton; Godolphin
- Trainer: James Fanshawe; Saeed bin Suroor
- Record: 20: 5-5-2
- Earnings: £1,888,833

Major wins
- Arc Trial (2001); Singapore Airlines International Cup (2002); Prince of Wales's Stakes (2002); Irish Champion Stakes (2002); Al Maktoum Challenge, Round 3 (2003)

Awards
- European Champion Older Horse 2002
- Last updated on June 22, 2007

Grandera (foaled 21 April 1998) is a retired Thoroughbred racehorse and active sire who was bred in Ireland and trained in the United Kingdom and Dubai during a racing career which lasted from 2000 to 2003. He is best known for his 2002 campaign, in which he won the World Series Racing Championship and the Cartier Racing Award for European Champion Older Horse.

== Background ==
Grandera, described by the New Zealand Herald as "a stunning individual", is a bright chestnut horse with a white blaze and white socks on his three of his feet.

He was bred in County Kildare, Ireland by Stan Cosgrove, the manager of the Moyglare Stud. Grandera was sired by Grand Lodge and was the second foal of the Alysheba mare Bordighera, making him a half-brother to George Washington. Grand Lodge, a winner of the Dewhurst Stakes and St James's Palace Stakes, sired the winners of almost seven hundred races before his death in 2003, including the Derby and Arc winner Sinndar.

Sold as a yearling to Roger Shelton for Ir£30,000, Grandera was sent into training with James Fanshawe, but transferred to Saeed bin Suroor at the end of his three-year-old season, having been purchased by Godolphin.

Apart from his racing ability, Grandera was known for his difficult temperament, being described by Godolphin's racing manager Simon Crisford as "a thoroughly unpleasant beast" and "a bit nasty", whilst Frankie Dettori is reported to have referred to him as "a lunatic" and "a nightmare".

== Racing career ==
=== 2000: two-year-old season ===
Grandera began his career with a fifth place in a maiden race at Doncaster in July 2000, before claiming his first win in a similar event at Warwick. He was then moved up to Group company, finishing second in the Somerville Tattersall Stakes, with future Group One winners Imperial Dancer and Storming Home amongst the beaten horses. On his final start of the year he finished seventh behind Dilshaan in the Group One Racing Post Trophy.

Commenting on the colt's first season, James Fanshawe later said, "He was rather weak as a two-year-old and anything he did then... was going to be a bonus".

=== 2001: three-year-old season ===
Grandera proved himself to be a colt of the highest class in 2001 with a series of placed efforts. He began with a second place in the Dee Stakes at Chester, before running third, beaten less than a length, in the Prix du Jockey-Club. In the Eclipse Stakes at Sandown he took the lead in the closing stages but was caught four strides from the line and beaten half a length by Medicean. Grandera reversed the form with Medicean in the International Stakes but had no chance against the seven-length winner Sakhee.

He recorded his first win in over a year in September, beating Mubtaker in the Arc Trial, despite failing to run straight in the closing stages and carrying his head awkwardly. After the race Fanshawe announced that the Grandera would be aimed at the Prix de l'Arc de Triomphe, but the colt was bought shortly afterwards by Godolphin and did not run again that year.

=== 2002: four-year-old season ===
Grandera sent to winter in Dubai, before embarking on a four-year-old campaign which took him to six different countries. He began with a second place in the Dubai City of Gold at Nad Al Sheba, before moving to Hong Kong where he finished fifth in the Queen Elizabeth II Cup at Sha Tin Racecourse behind Eishin Preston. His next appearance was at Kranji Racecourse in Singapore, where he scored a decisive victory in the Singapore Airlines International Cup, taking the lead inside the final furlong and pulling away to beat the German colt Paolini by two lengths with the Hong Kong champion Indigenous in third.

On returning to the British Isles, Grandera produced what was arguably his finest performance in the Prince of Wales's Stakes at Royal Ascot. Despite behaving aggressively towards the other horses in the parade ring and racing with his head at a high, odd angle ("as if consulting an airport timetable"), he produced a strong run in the straight to pull five lengths clear of a field which included Banks Hill and Nayef.

As a result of this win, he was sent off 13-8 favourite for the King George VI and Queen Elizabeth Stakes a month later, but could finish only fifth behind Golan. He came back to his best in the Irish Champion Stakes at Leopardstown, producing a strong finishing burst to catch the future World Champion Hawk Wing in the last strides and take a short-head victory. His rider, Frankie Dettori called Grandera "a very peculiar character but... enormously talented" after the race.

Seven weeks later, Grandera arrived to contest the Cox Plate at Melbourne's Moonee Valley Racecourse, where special arrangements, including a double-sized stall, were made to accommodate his difficult temperament. Five lengths behind at the start of the short straight, Grandera finished strongly to finish third behind Northerly, ahead of Sunline, Fields of Omagh and Lonhro.

On his final start of the year he finished seventh as odds-on favourite for the Hong Kong Cup, but his performances had been enough to win the World Series Racing Championship.

=== 2003: five-year-old season ===
Grandera stayed in training as a five-year-old, but was less successful. After winning a prep race at Nad Al Sheba, he was fancied for the Dubai World Cup, but was rejected by Frankie Dettori in favour of Sulamani. Familiar doubts about Grandera's temperament resurfaced- one correspondent referred to him as being "nutty as a fruitcake"- as he finished a well-beaten fourth to Moon Ballad.

A return to Europe brought no improvement as he finished down the field in the Prince of Wales's Stakes and Eclipse Stakes. In the King George VI and Queen Elizabeth Stakes, his starting price of 33-1 and the fact that Dettori again chose to ride Sulamani both reflected his decline. He was fitted with cheek-pieces, which are normally used to improve a horse's concentration, but seemed "reluctant" to race and finished eleventh of the twelve runners.

He was then retired to stud.

== Assessment ==
Grandera was named as the Champion Older Horse in the 2002 Cartier Racing Awards.

In the 2001 International Classification he was rated 119 making him the thirteenth-best three-year-old colt in Europe, ten pounds below the champion Galileo.

In the 2002 International Classification he was rated as 126, placing him third behind Rock of Gibraltar and Marienbard. These ratings covered horses raced in Europe, North America and Japan.

Grandera was rated 129 by Timeform.

== Stud career ==
Grandera was sent to stud at the Yushun Stallion Station in Hokkaido, Japan in 2003, and was also "shuttled" to stand at the Hunter Valley Stud for Darley Australia. In 2010, he was returned to Ireland to stand at the Woodlands Stud, County Galway.

== Pedigree ==
Pedigree of Grandera (IRE), chestnut stallion, 1998
Sire Grand Lodge (USA) 1991	Chief's Crown; 1982	Danzig	Northern Dancer
Sire Grand Lodge (USA) 1991	Chief's Crown; 1982	Danzig	Pas de Nom
Sire Grand Lodge (USA) 1991	Chief's Crown; 1982	Six Crowns	Secretariat
Sire Grand Lodge (USA) 1991	Chief's Crown; 1982	Six Crowns	Chris Evert
Sire Grand Lodge (USA) 1991	La Papagena; 1983	Habitat	Sir Gaylord
Sire Grand Lodge (USA) 1991	La Papagena; 1983	Habitat	Little Hut
Sire Grand Lodge (USA) 1991	La Papagena; 1983	Magic Flute	Tudor Melody
Sire Grand Lodge (USA) 1991	La Papagena; 1983	Magic Flute	Filigrana
Dam Bordighera (USA) 1992	Alysheba; 1984	Alydar	Raise a Native
Dam Bordighera (USA) 1992	Alysheba; 1984	Alydar	Sweet Tooth
Dam Bordighera (USA) 1992	Alysheba; 1984	Bel Sheba	Lt. Stevens
Dam Bordighera (USA) 1992	Alysheba; 1984	Bel Sheba	Belthazar
Dam Bordighera (USA) 1992	Blue Tip; 1982	Tip Moss	Luthier
Dam Bordighera (USA) 1992	Blue Tip; 1982	Tip Moss	Top Twig
Dam Bordighera (USA) 1992	Blue Tip; 1982	As Blue	Blue Tom
Dam Bordighera (USA) 1992	Blue Tip; 1982	As Blue	As Well (Family: 5-g)
