= Kieren Fallon =

Irish jockey (born 1965)

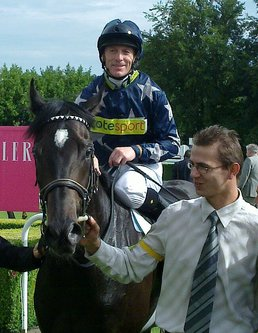
- Kieren Fallon on Start Right at Goodwood in 2010.

Personal information
- Born: 22 February 1965 (age 61) Crusheen, County Clare, Ireland
- Occupation: Jockey

Horse racing career
- Sport: Horse racing
- Career wins: 2253 wins

Major racing wins
- 2,000 Guineas Stakes (2000, 2001, 2005, 2006, 2014); 1,000 Guineas Stakes (1997, 1999, 2003, 2005); Epsom Derby (1999, 2003, 2004); Epsom Oaks (1997, 1999, 2004, 2006); Arlington Million (2005)

Racing awards
- British flat racing Champion Jockey 6 times (1997, 1998, 1999, 2001, 2002, 2003)

Significant horses
- Golan

1000 Guineas (4)
1997
Sleepytime	Oh Nellie	Dazzle
1999
Wince	Wannabe Grand	Valentine Waltz
2003
Russian Rhythm	Six Perfections	Intercontinental
2005
Virginia Waters	Maids Causeway	Vista Bella

2000 Guineas (5)
2000
King's Best	Giant's Causeway	Barathea Guest
2001
Golan	Tamburlaine	Frenchmans Bay
2005
Footstepsinthesand	Rebel Rebel	Kandidate
2006
George Washington	Sir Percy	Olympian Odyssey
2014
Night Of Thunder	Kingman	Australia

Derby (3)
1999
Oath	Daliapour	Beat All
2003
Kris Kin	The Great Gatsby	Alamshar
2004
North Light	Rule of Law	Let The Lion Roar

Oaks (4)
1997
Reams of Verse	Gazelle Royale	Crown of Light
1999
Ramruma	Noushkey	Zahrat Dubai
2004
Ouija Board	All Too Beautiful	Punctilious
2006
Alexandrova	Rising Cross	Short Skirt

Prix de l'Arc de Triomphe (2)
2005
Hurricane Run	Westerner	Bago
2007
Dylan Thomas	Youmzain	Sagara

Kieren Francis Fallon (born 22 February 1965 in Crusheen, County Clare, Ireland) is a retired Irish professional flat racing jockey and was British Champion Jockey six times.

== Career ==
=== Stable jockey to Henry Cecil ===
In 1997, Fallon became the stable jockey for Henry Cecil, one of Britain's leading trainers. In May 1997 he recorded his first Classic win when taking the 1000 Guineas on the Cecil-trained filly Sleepytime. Cecil called him "a very hard worker" and a "Group One Jockey" while Richard Edmondson, writing in The Independent, praised Fallon's riding ability while pointing out his poor disciplinary record. Both sides of Fallon's character were soon evident as he was given a ten-day ban for his riding in a race in Italy, which he successfully had postponed to ride in The Oaks, which he won on Reams of Verse for Cecil. Fallon ended the season with 202 wins and his first Champion Jockey title.

Fallon retained the Jockeys' Championship for the next two seasons, riding more than 200 winners on each occasion. In 1999 he won his first Derby when he rode the Cecil-trained Oath to victory at Epsom and followed up by winning the Oaks on Ramruma for the same stable. Less than two months later Fallon was dismissed as Cecil's stable jockey for reasons which were never fully explained.

=== Stable jockey to Michael Stoute ===
Following his dismissal, Fallon rode as a freelance jockey, riding for many top owners and trainers, before becoming stable jockey to the powerful stable of Sir Michael Stoute. During his time with Stoute, Fallon rode the winners of many important races including successive runnings of the 2000 Guineas with King's Best and Golan. Between these two victories, Fallon lost his Champion Jockey title after a serious arm injury sustained in a fall in June 2000 at Royal Ascot forced him to miss several months race-riding. The accident came shortly after a riding ban prevented him from riding in the Derby.

Fallon's post at the Stoute stable came to an end in November 2001, when Stoute announced that some of his main owners did not want to use Fallon as a jockey for their horses, making his position untenable. Despite having no formal connection with the stable, Fallon continued to ride major winners for Stoute including the Derby winners Kris Kin in 2003 and North Light in 2004.

=== Allegations of "Conspiracy to Defraud" ===
In the spring of 2004 the News of the World newspaper made allegations of race fixing against Fallon. He was due to appear before the Jockey Club later in the year to answer the allegations when on 1 September 2004, he was arrested as part of a police investigation into the alleged fixing of over 80 races in the previous two years. On 15 December 2004 the Jockey Club discontinued its investigation into the allegations.

On 3 July 2006, Fallon was charged along with seven other people for conspiring to defraud the Internet betting exchange Betfair. Fallon was banned from riding in the UK until his trial was over, but was still able to race in the Republic of Ireland.

On 8 October 2007, his trial on charges of race-fixing began at the Old Bailey court in London. During the trial, the jury heard that gangster Daniel Kinahan had travelled to England to confront Fallon at his home after Fallon won races he had been instructed to lose, but turned back after realising he was under surveillance. On 7 December 2007, the judge decided the defendants had no case to answer and he directed the jury to find Fallon and all his co-defendants not guilty because of lack of evidence. His suspension from British racing was lifted with immediate effect.

=== Stable jockey to Aidan O'Brien ===
In February 2005 Fallon accepted the post of first jockey to Aidan O'Brien's powerful Ballydoyle stable. His new career began impressively, with a win on Footstepsinthesand in the 2000 Guineas. By the end of the season he had recorded further important wins on horses such as Yeats, George Washington and Oratorio. Fallon's 2006 ban from riding in England curtailed his opportunities, but more important wins followed for the Ballydoyle team, notably on the 2007 European Horse of the Year Dylan Thomas. Fallon's position with O'Brien ended with his 18-month worldwide ban imposed by the French racing authorities in January 2008.

=== Positive tests ===
On 29 November 2006 French racing authority France Galop suspended Fallon for six months after testing positive for a metabolite of a prohibited substance after riding at Chantilly on 9 July 2006. The ban ran from 7 December 2006 to 6 June 2007. On 8 December 2007, it came out that Fallon had tested positive again for a banned substance on 19 August 2007 at Deauville Racecourse in France. On 25 January 2008 Fallon received an 18-month riding suspension for this offence. He resumed race riding at Lingfield Park on 4 September 2009.

=== Return as freelance ===
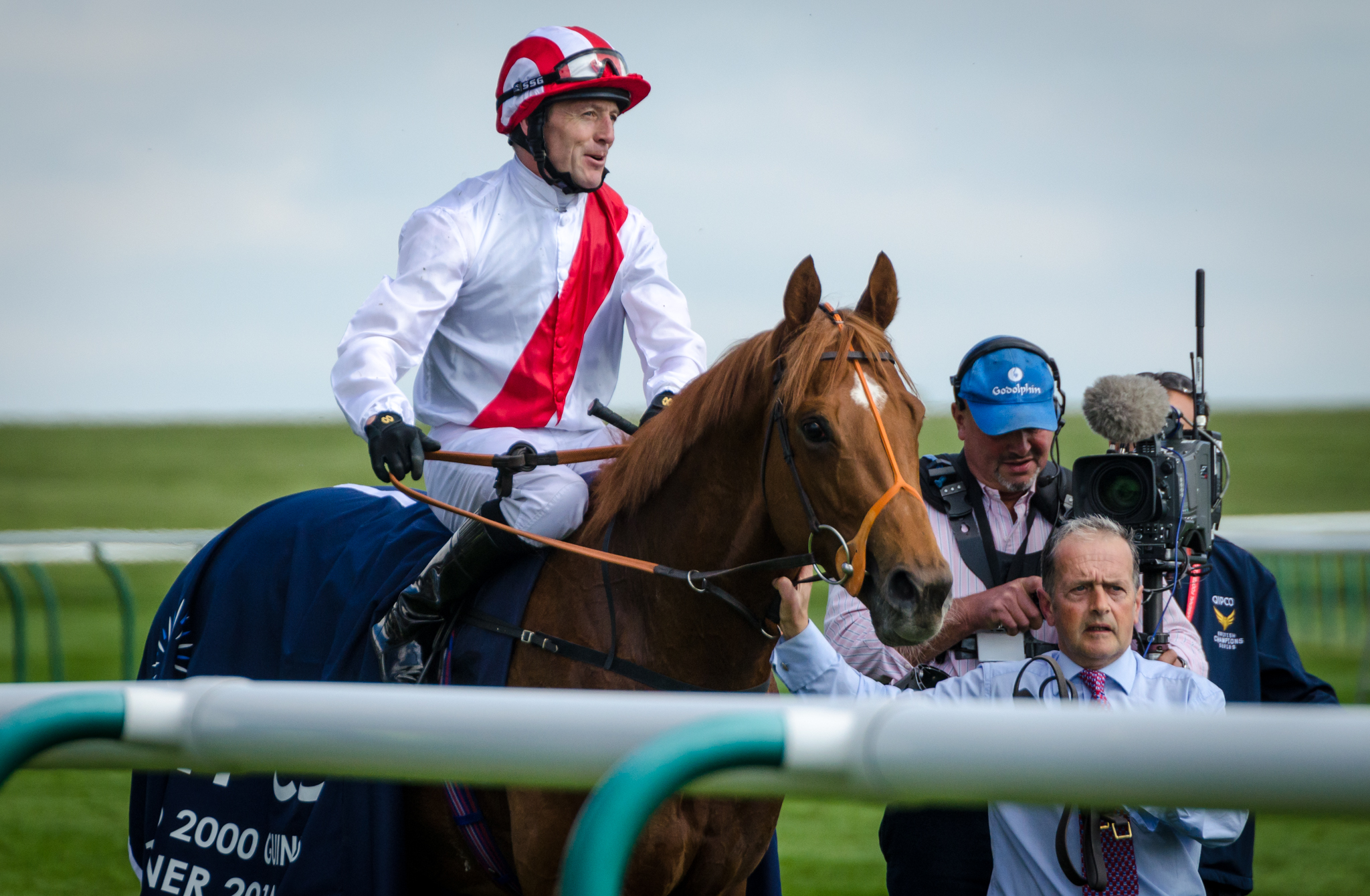
Night of Thunder after winning the 2014 2000 Guineas

The 2010 Flat racing season saw Kieren Fallon employed largely by trainers Luca Cumani, Mark Johnston and Kevin Ryan. Although major wins were less frequent, Fallon had success, riding 140 winners in 2010 and 154 in 2011. In the latter season he finished third in the Jockeys' championship behind Paul Hanagan.

In 2014, Fallon rode to victory in the 2000 Guineas. Allowing Night of Thunder to drift across the track to the left having been on the right of the track, Fallon got up in the final strides to win the race and to take his first classic in 8 years.

== Personal life ==
Fallon has three children with his ex-wife Julie: Natalie Ann Fallon (b. 1994), and twins Brittany Michelle and Cieren Richard Fallon (b. 1999). He also had a child with another woman while married to Julie. Until his death in 2024, Brittany Fallon was the girlfriend of Italian jockey Stefano Cherchi. Cieren Fallon is also a jockey and won his first race at Leicester in 2018. He won the British flat racing Champion Apprentice title in 2019 and won his first Group 1 race in July 2020 when he rode Oxted, trained by Roger Teal, to victory in the July Cup at Newmarket.

As of 2010, Fallon writes a column in the Racing Post Weekender during the flat season.

In July 2016 Fallon announced that he had been diagnosed with depression and had decided to retire from racing.

Fallon released his autobiography Form in 2017, which was published by Simon & Schuster.

== Career wins in Great Britain ==
* = Champion Jockey

- 1991 – 29
- 1992 – 45
- 1993 – 60
- 1994 – 47
- 1995 – 92
- 1996 – 136
- 1997 – 202 *
- 1998 – 204 *
- 1999 – 202 *
- 2000 – 59
- 2001 – 166 *
- 2002 – 149 *
- 2003 – 221 *
- 2004 – 200
- 2005 – 70
- 2006 – 27
- 2007 – 0
- 2008 – 0
- 2009 – 50
- 2010 – 140
- 2011 – 154
- 2012 – 87
- 2013 – 62
- 2014 – 62
- 2015 - 10
- 2016 - 7

Sources: jockeysroom.com (1991–2001), racingpost.co.uk (2002–present)

== Major wins ==
(United Kingdom) Great Britain

- 1,000 Guineas – (4) – Sleepytime (1997), Wince (1999), Russian Rhythm (2003), Virginia Waters (2005)
- 2,000 Guineas – (5) – King's Best (2000), Golan (2001), Footstepsinthesand (2005), George Washington (2006), Night of Thunder (2014)
- Ascot Gold Cup – (2) – Mr Dinos (2003), Yeats (2006)
- Cheveley Park Stakes – (1) – Embassy (1997)
- Coronation Cup – (3) – Daliapour (2000), Boreal (2002), Yeats (2005)
- Coronation Stakes – (1) – Russian Rhythm (2003)
- Derby – (3) – Oath (1999), Kris Kin (2003), North Light (2004)
- Eclipse Stakes – (2) – Medicean (2001), Oratorio (2005)
- Fillies' Mile – (1) – Red Bloom (2003)
- Haydock Sprint Cup – (1) – Society Rock (2012)
- King George VI and Queen Elizabeth Stakes – (1) – Golan (2002)
- Lockinge Stakes – (3) – Medicean (2001), Russian Rhythm (2004), Peeress (2006)
- Nassau Stakes – (3) – Islington (2002), Russian Rhythm (2003), Favourable Terms (2004)
- Oaks – (4) – Reams of Verse (1997), Ramruma (1999), Ouija Board (2004), Alexandrova (2006)
- Prince of Wales's Stakes – (1) – Bosra Sham (1997)
- Queen Anne Stakes – (3) – Kalanisi (2000), Medicean (2001), Ad Valorem (2006)
- Racing Post Trophy – (1) – Motivator (2004)
- St. James's Palace Stakes – (2) – Dr Fong (1998), Most Improved (2012)
- Sun Chariot Stakes – (1) – Independence (2001)
- Sussex Stakes – (1) – Ali-Royal (1997)
- Yorkshire Oaks – (4) – Catchascatchcan (1998), Islington (2002, 2003), Quiff (2004)

(Republic of Ireland) Ireland

- Irish Champion Stakes – (3) – Oratorio (2005), Dylan Thomas (2006, 2007)
- Irish Derby – (2) – Hurricane Run (2005), Dylan Thomas (2006)
- Irish Oaks – (3) – Ramruma (1999), Ouija Board (2004), Alexandrova (2006)
- Irish St. Leger – (1) – Yeats (2007)
- Matron Stakes – (1) – Favourable Terms (2003)
- Moyglare Stud Stakes – (1) – Rumplestiltskin (2005)
- National Stakes – (1) – George Washington (2005)
- Phoenix Stakes – (3) – Damson (2004), George Washington (2005), Holy Roman Emperor (2006)
- Pretty Polly Stakes – (1) – Peeping Fawn (2007)
- Tattersalls Gold Cup – (2) – Shiva (1999), Hurricane Run (2006)

Australia

- A J Moir Stakes – (1) – California Dane (2006)
- Hong Kong Jockey Club Plate – (1) – Polar Bear (2006)

France

- Grand Prix de Paris – (1) – Scorpion (2005)
- Grand Prix de Saint-Cloud – (2) – Gamut (2004), Mountain High (2007)
- Poule d'Essai des Poulains – (1) – Aussie Rules (2006)
- Prix de l'Arc de Triomphe – (2) – Hurricane Run (2005), Dylan Thomas (2007)
- Prix de la Forêt – (1) – Tomba (1998)
- Prix d'Ispahan – (1) – Falbrav (2003)
- Prix Jean-Luc Lagardère – (3) – Hold That Tiger (2002), Horatio Nelson (2005), Holy Roman Emperor (2006)
- Prix Marcel Boussac – (1) – Rumplestiltskin (2005)
- Prix Morny – (2) – Elusive City (2002), Myboycharlie (2007)
- Prix de l'Opéra – (1) – Zee Zee Top (2003)

Germany

- Grosser Preis von Baden – (1) – Borgia (1997)
- Preis der Diana – (1) – Dancing Rain (2011)
- Preis von Europa – (1) – Youmzain (2006)

Hong Kong

- Hong Kong Vase – (1) – Ouija Board (2005)

Italy

- Oaks d'Italia – (2) – Guadalupe (2002), Contredanse (2010)

United Arab Emirates

- Dubai Golden Shaheen – (1) – Krypton Factor (2012)
- Dubai Sheema Classic – (2) – Fruits of Love (1999), Fantastic Light (2000)
- Al Maktoum Challenge, Round 3 - (1) - Prince Bishop (2014)

United States

- Arlington Million – (1) – Powerscourt (2005)
- Breeders' Cup Filly & Mare Turf – (2) – Islington (2003), Ouija Board (2004)
- Goodwood Stakes – (1) – Gitano Hernando (2009)

== See also ==
- List of jockeys
- Sporting Life for 1998 libel case

Sporting positions
Preceded by Jamie Spencer	Ballydoyle retained jockey 2005-2007	Succeeded by Johnny Murtagh
