= Nayef (horse) =

American-bred, British-trained Thoroughbred racehorse

- Racing colours of Hamdan Al Maktoum
- Sire: Gulch
- Grandsire: Mr. Prospector
- Dam: Height of Fashion
- Damsire: Bustino
- Sex: Stallion
- Foaled: 1 May 1998
- Country: United States
- Colour: Bay
- Breeder: Shadwell Stud
- Owner: Sheikh Hamdan Al Maktoum.
- Trainer: Marcus Tregoning
- Record: 19: 9-2-4
- Earnings: £2,350,401

Major wins
- Rose of Lancaster Stakes (2001); Select Stakes (2001); Cumberland Lodge Stakes (2001); Champion Stakes (2001); Dubai Sheema Classic (2002); International Stakes (2002); Prince of Wales's Stakes (2003); Timeform rating: 129
- Last updated on 2 August 2022

Nayef (foaled 1 May 1998) is a retired Thoroughbred racehorse and active sire. Bred in the United States and trained in the United Kingdom, his racing career ran from 2000 to 2003. He is best known for winning a series of important races, including four Group One races: the Champion Stakes, the Dubai Sheema Classic, the International Stakes and the Prince of Wales's Stakes.

== Background ==
Nayef is a large, powerfully built bay horse bred in Kentucky by his owner, Sheikh Hamdan Al Maktoum. He was sired by Gulch and was the last foal of the notable broodmare Height of Fashion, making him a half-brother to Derby winner Nashwan and multiple Group race winner Unfuwain.

He was trained throughout his career by Marcus Tregoning at Kingwood Stables in Lambourn and ridden in seventeen of his nineteen races by Richard Hills.

== Racing career ==
=== 2000: two-year-old season ===
Unlike most racehorses, Nayef bypassed maiden races, making his debut instead against more experienced colts in the Listed Haynes, Hanson and Clark Conditions Stakes at Newbury. He was nevertheless made 7-4 favourite on the basis of his reputation and won by a neck from Tamburlaine. The form of the race looked particularly strong when the runner-up went on to finish second in the Group One Racing Post Trophy later in the season. Nayef followed up in the Autumn Stakes at Ascot, taking the lead a furlong from the finish and pulling away to win by an "impressive" six lengths. Once again, the form of the race was boosted by later events, when the third-placed Count Dubois won the Group One Gran Criterium in Milan two weeks later.

Nayef's two-year-old career had followed a family pattern: Unfuwain had won the Haynes, Hanson and Clark Conditions Stakes in 1987, while Nashwan won the Autumn Stakes a year later.

Nayef was made winter favourite for both the 2,000 Guineas and the Derby, despite never having contested a Group race. The official handicapper, Matthew Tester, awarded him "the highest rating a two-year-old has ever been given without running in Group company". One writer later noted that Nayef had been "hyped as the second coming of Pegasus".

=== 2001: three-year-old season ===
Nayef failed to realise his promise in the early part of 2001. He began with an odds-on defeat to Tobougg on soft ground in the Craven Stakes. and in the 2,000 Guineas he appeared to be outpaced after disputing the lead for most of the way and faded to finish eighth behind Golan. A week before the Derby, Marcus Tregoning withdrew Nayef from the race, feeling that he was not mature enough for Epsom and saying that the colt had "grown an awful lot and I just feel his strength has gone for the time being".

On his return to the racecourse, Nayef finished third in the Group Three Gordon Stakes at Goodwood, prompting one columnist to write that "if there has been one disappointment this season, it has been Nayef".

From that point on however, his form improved steadily. He won the Rose of Lancaster Stakes at Haydock by five lengths despite being eased down in the closing stages and then took the Select Stakes "easily" by six. In September he won his third Group race in a row, "ploughing" through soft ground at Ascot in the Cumberland Lodge Stakes. Jim McGrath, writing in the Telegraph, said, "Nayef has been a revelation in the last few weeks, showing signs that he is starting to mature into the colt many hoped he would be."

In October, he was moved up to the highest level to run in the Group One Champion Stakes at Newmarket. Nayef recorded his most important success so far, taking the lead inside the last furlong and beating Tobougg by three quarters of a length in "courageous and decisive" style. Tregoning said, "I always knew we had the item."

=== 2002: four-year-old season ===
Nayef began 2002 by being taken to the UAE to participate in the Dubai World Cup. He was well supported in the betting, being offered at odds of 11/2, but shortly before the race he was withdrawn by Hamdan Al Maktoum, who preferred to rely on Sakhee. Nayef was re-routed to the longer Dubai Sheema Classic which he won easily by two lengths from a field that included runners from France, Germany, Hong Kong, Saudi Arabia, Singapore, Japan and the UAE.

For the second consecutive year, Nayef took time to produce his best form in Europe. In the Tattersalls Gold Cup on soft ground at the Curragh, he was beaten as odds-on favourite by the Irish filly Rebelline, and at Royal Ascot he finished fourth, seven lengths behind Grandera, in the Prince of Wales's Stakes.

In the King George VI and Queen Elizabeth Stakes at Ascot, Nayef ran his best race since returning from Dubai. He was sent into the lead by Richard Hills in the straight, but despite staying on well under pressure, he was overtaken fifty yards from the finish and beaten a head by Golan. He improved further at York, where he reversed the form with Golan in the International Stakes. The two colts were again closely matched, but this time Nayef prevailed by half a length, prompting his connections to talk of travelling to Chicago for the Breeders' Cup.

However, Nayef was unable to compete in any of the major autumn races. Shortly before a scheduled attempt to win a second Champion Stakes, he contracted a respiratory infection which forced him to miss the rest of the season.

=== 2003: five-year-old season ===
Nayef began his five-year-old career by once again travelling to Dubai as a leading hope for the Dubai World Cup, but this time he was allowed to take part. He started 11/8 favourite but, having his first run for seven months and racing on dirt for the first time, he finished third to Moon Ballad.

Nayef returned to England to record his last important victory in the Prince of Wales's Stakes. Taking the lead in the straight, he pulled clear to claim a two and a half length win, beating a field which included Rakti, Falbrav, Grandera, Islington and Moon Ballad. After this win Marcus Tregoning described him as, "a super racehorse, everybody's dream of a racehorse".

Hopes of securing a £1,000,000 "Summer Triple Crown" bonus ended in his next race when he finished strongly but was unable to overhaul Falbrav in the Eclipse Stakes after Richard Hills had been unable to find space for a clear run in the early part of the straight. Despite this defeat, Nayef was made favourite for the King George VI and Queen Elizabeth Stakes three weeks later but was unable to produce any serious challenge in finishing seventh to Alamshar. It was the first time that he had finished out of the prize money since his run in the 2,000 Guineas well over two years previously.

In his last two starts, Nayef was unable to recapture his form. In the International Stakes, he finished three lengths further behind Falbrav than he had done in the Eclipse and in the Champion Stakes, he faded in the closing stages to finish eighth of the twelve runners behind Rakti.

== Assessment ==
In the 2000 International Classification, Nayef was rated 119, making him the fourth-highest-rated two-year-old colt in Europe. A year later, he was rated 121, making him the sixth-highest-rated three-year-old colt in Europe. In 2002, Nayef was rated 125, making him the eighth-highest-rated horse in the Classification.

In the 2003 edition of the World Thoroughbred Racehorse Rankings, Nayef was again rated at 125, making him the eleventh best horse in the world.

Nayef was given a peak Timeform rating of 129.

== Stud career ==
Nayef was retired from racing to stand as a stallion at his owner's Nunnery Stud.

His successful progeny include Tamayuz, Lady Marian (Prix de l'Opéra), Spacious (Windsor Forest Stakes) and Confront (Joel Stakes).

== Pedigree ==
Pedigree of Nayef (USA), bay stallion, 1998
Sire Gulch (USA) 1984	Mr. Prospector (USA); 1970	Raise a Native	Native Dancer
Sire Gulch (USA) 1984	Mr. Prospector (USA); 1970	Raise a Native	Raise You
Sire Gulch (USA) 1984	Mr. Prospector (USA); 1970	Gold Digger	Nashua
Sire Gulch (USA) 1984	Mr. Prospector (USA); 1970	Gold Digger	Sequence
Sire Gulch (USA) 1984	Jameela (USA); 1976	Rambunctious	Rasper
Sire Gulch (USA) 1984	Jameela (USA); 1976	Rambunctious	Danaë
Sire Gulch (USA) 1984	Jameela (USA); 1976	Asbury Mary	Seven Corners
Sire Gulch (USA) 1984	Jameela (USA); 1976	Asbury Mary	Snow Flyer
Dam Height of Fashion (GB) 1979	Bustino (GB); 1971	Busted	Crepello
Dam Height of Fashion (GB) 1979	Bustino (GB); 1971	Busted	Sans Le Sou
Dam Height of Fashion (GB) 1979	Bustino (GB); 1971	Ship Yard	Doutelle
Dam Height of Fashion (GB) 1979	Bustino (GB); 1971	Ship Yard	Paving Stone
Dam Height of Fashion (GB) 1979	Highclere (GB); 1971	Queen's Hussar	March Past
Dam Height of Fashion (GB) 1979	Highclere (GB); 1971	Queen's Hussar	Jojo
Dam Height of Fashion (GB) 1979	Highclere (GB); 1971	Highlight	Borealis
Dam Height of Fashion (GB) 1979	Highclere (GB); 1971	Highlight	Hypericum (Family: 2-f)
