= Elite Racing Club =

Horse racing enterprise

Racing silks of Elite Racing Club

Elite Racing Club Limited is a horseracing enterprise owned by Anthony Hill.

Elite Racing Club was set up by Hill in 1992. Hill had purchased a racehorse in 1991 and named it Elite Reg to promote his company Elite Registrations. Although Elite Reg did not win any races under the ownership of Hill, he inspired his owner to set up a racing club to finance the purchase of more racehorses. Elite Racing Club was incorporated as a private limited company in 1996.

As well as owning and breeding racehorses, the company runs a club. Members of the club pay an annual fee (£199 in 2023), which entitles them to a weekly newsletter, the possibility of visiting racing stables and racecourses and a share of prize money. Unlike members of a racing syndicate, members of the club do not own shares in the racehorses.

Over a thirty year period from 1993 to 2022, Elite Racing Club Limited had 249 winners. Their most successful year was 2004, with 16 winners out of 64 runs and prize money of £560,886. The company's horses have raced both on the flat and over jumps. Their first Grade win came in 1995 when Mysilv won the Tote Gold Trophy Handicap Hurdle. In 2002 Soviet Song provided them with their first Group 1 win in 2002. Soviet Song, who was bred by Elite Racing Club Limited and trained by James Fanshawe, went on to win a further four Group 1 races, as well as two Group 2 races. Marsha, bred and owned by Elite Racing Club Limited and trained by Mark Prescott, won two Group 1 races (the Prix de l'Abbaye in 2016 and the Nunthorpe Stakes in 2017) before being sold for a European record of 6,000,000 guineas. Between 2014 and 2022, the sprinter Judicial, bred and owned by Elite Racing Club Limited and trained by Julie Camacho, won 17 races including two Group 3 races. Penzance, trained by Alan King, provided Elite Racing Club Limited with their only Grade 1 success over jumps when he won the Triumph Hurdle in 2005.

As of 2023, Elite Racing Club Limited had seven horses in training with four trainers.
