= Golan (horse) =

Irish-bred Thoroughbred racehorse

- The Weinstock colours
- Sire: Spectrum
- Grandsire: Rainbow Quest
- Dam: Highland Gift
- Damsire: Generous
- Sex: Stallion
- Foaled: 1998
- Country: Ireland
- Colour: Bay
- Breeder: Ballymacoll Stud
- Owner: Exors Of The Late Lord Weinstock
- Trainer: Sir Michael Stoute
- Record: 11: 4-2-1
- Earnings: £1,212,002

Major wins
- 2000 Guineas Stakes (2001); Prix Niel (2001); King George VI and Queen Elizabeth Stakes (2002)

Golan (foaled 24 February 1998) is a retired Thoroughbred racehorse and active sire who was bred in Ireland, but trained in the United Kingdom throughout his racing career, which lasted from 2000 to 2002. He won the 2000 Guineas in 2001 and King George VI and Queen Elizabeth Diamond Stakes in 2002. He won the latter race after an eight-month absence from the racecourse.

== Background ==
Golan was bred in Ireland by Lord Weinstock's Ballymacoll Stud in County Meath. On Lord Weinstock's death in 2002, his Thoroughbreds, including Golan, passed to the executors of his estate. Both his sire, Spectrum, and his dam, Highland Gift, had been bred at the Ballymacoll Stud and raced in the Weinstock colours. In fact, the families of both Golan's parents had been based at the stud for more than 60 years.

Spectrum won the Irish 2,000 Guineas and the Champion Stakes as a three-year-old colt in 1995, in which he was rated the second-best British colt, behind Lammtarra. At stud, he produced the winners of more than 400 races before being exported first to South Africa and then to New Zealand. Apart from Golan, his best offspring were Gamut (Grand Prix de Saint-Cloud), Racinger (Prix du Muguet), Just James (Challenge Stakes) and Tartan Bearer.

Highland Gift won one minor race, and came from a good family, being the half-sister of the Great Voltigeur Stakes winner Bonny Scot. She has also produced Golan's full brother, the Derby runner-up Tartan Bearer.

Golan was trained throughout his career by Michael Stoute at Newmarket, Suffolk, and was ridden in eight of his 11 races by Kieren Fallon.

== Racing career ==
=== 2000: two-year-old career ===
Golan began his career in September 2000, when he contested a maiden race at Chepstow. He started 5/4 favourite and won "readily" by one and a quarter lengths, having been sent into the lead by Fergal Lynch a furlong from the finish. Although Golan did not race again that year, the form of the race was boosted when the runner-up, Clearing, was an impressive three-and-a-half-length winner of the Group Three Horris Hill Stakes in October.

=== 2001: three-year-old season ===
==== Spring ====
Golan was sent straight to the highest level as a three-year-old, making his first appearance of the season in the 2000 Guineas. Despite his lack of experience, Golan had been supported in the betting for the race on the strength of impressive work in training, with his price falling from 25/1 to 9/1 before steadying at 11/1 on the day. The colt did show signs of inexperience, breaking slowly and tracking sharply left to be last of the 18 runners after a furlong. Fallon settled Golan at the back of the field then took him to the outside where he produced a sustained run. Golan moved up from last to take the lead a furlong from the finish, and was driven out by Fallon to win by one and a quarter lengths from Tamburlaine Fallon described Golan's acceleration as "incredible, the best I've ever known from a horse", while Stoute called him "a very exciting prospect". More neutral observers were also impressed, noting that the colt's pedigree contained stamina influences, suggesting that he could be a Triple Crown contender.

==== Summer ====
Golan was made favourite for the Derby, but his position was challenged by the form of the Aidan O'Brien-trained Galileo and at Epsom the two colts started joint favourites at 11/4. Golan was ridden by the veteran Pat Eddery, as Fallon was serving a ban for irresponsible riding. Golan settled well and turned into the straight in sixth place. He made steady progress in the last quarter of a mile, moving into second a furlong out. Galileo, however, had already gone clear and ran on well to beat Golan by three and a half lengths. After the race, Stoute offered no real excuses, except to say that Golan may have been unsuited by the firm ground.

Three weeks later, Golan again challenged Galileo in the Irish Derby at the Curragh. He started 4/1 second favourite, but was never a threat to the favourite, and although he made some progress in the straight, he was beaten eight lengths, finishing third behind Galileo and the Derby Italiano winner Morshdi.

==== Autumn ====
Golan was then prepared for the Prix de l'Arc de Triomphe and appeared next in the Prix Niel, a recognised trial race. Although the Niel is a Group Two race, it typically attracts a field of Group One strength, having been won in the previous five years by horses such as Sinndar, Montjeu and Helissio. In the 2001 running, Golan was opposed by the two leading French colts, Anabaa Blue (Prix du Jockey Club) and Chichicastenango (Prix Lupin, Grand Prix de Paris). Fallon tracked the leaders on Golan before sending the colt past Anabaa Blue a furlong and a half out. Golan was driven out to win by three quarters of a length in a race record time of 2:27.00. Fallon said that Golan was "definitely an Arc horse", while the bookmakers were undecided, offering odds ranging from 3/1 to 10/1.

In the Arc, run on soft (officially "holding") ground, Golan was made 7.6/1 fourth choice behind the Godolphin favourite Sakhee. Golan was ridden positively, and attempted to challenge Sakhee when the favourite was sent into the lead in the straight. He was unable to make any headway against the leader, however, and tired in the closing stages, losing second and third places close to the finish.

On his final start of the year, Golan, ridden by Johnny Murtagh, finished sixth of 15 behind Jungle Pocket in the Japan Cup.

Before his run in the Derby, Weinstock had sold a half-share in Golan to Coolmore, with a view to eventually standing the horse at one of the Irish organisation's studs at the end of the season. After the Japan Cup, however, it was announced that Golan would stay in training, with Stoute reported to be confident of gaining further success.

=== 2002: four-year-old season ===
==== Summer ====
Golan's seasonal reappearance was delayed when a training setback prevented him from running in the Eclipse Stakes.

In July, less than a week after the death of his owner, Arnold Weinstock, Golan made his first start of the year in Britain's most prestigious weight-for-age race, the King George VI and Queen Elizabeth Stakes. Despite his lack of a prep, Golan looked fit and relaxed before the race and was made joint second favourite at 11/2, behind the favourite Grandera. Fallon held Golan up in last place in the early stages, as the race was led by two pacemakers. In the straight, Golan moved through the field on the inside, and when Nayef took the lead just over a furlong from the finish, Fallon pushed Golan up to challenge. The two colts raced alongside each other throughout the final furlong, with Golan reaching the front 50 yards from the finish and winning by a head. After the race, Stoute praised his horse's performance while emphasising the "bittersweet" nature of the success, saying "Lord Weinstock would have simply loved this...he was so looking forward to seeing this horse race this year"

Golan and Nayef met again over a shorter distance in the International Stakes at York a month later. The two colts dominated both the betting and the race. Nayef took the lead two furlongs out and Fallon brought Golan to make a sustained challenge. Both horses ran on well under pressure, with Nayef reversing the Ascot form and recording a half-length victory.

==== Autumn ====
As in 2001, Golan was sent on an international campaign in autumn. In October, he was sent to Chicago for the Breeders' Cup Turf at Arlington Park. He was made 3.7/1 second favourite, but broke slowly and was never a threat, finishing sixth of the eight starters behind High Chaparral.

His career ended with a second unsuccessful attempt to win the Japan Cup. He made a strong challenge, reaching second place in the straight, but could make no further progress and finished seventh, beaten less than three lengths, behind Falbrav.

== Race record ==
Date	Race	Dist (f)	Course	Class	Prize (£K)	Odds	Runners	Placing	Margin	Time	Jockey	Trainer
7 September 2000	Newlands, Tippins & Wilkins Maiden Stakes	7	Chepstow	M	3	5/4	13	1	1.25	1:23.60	Fergal Lynch	Michael Stoute
5 May 2001	2000 Guineas	8	Newmarket Rowley	1	174	11/1	18	1	1.25	1:37.48	Kieren Fallon	Michael Stoute
9 June 2001	Derby	12	Epsom	1	580	11/4	12	2	3.5	2:33.27	Pat Eddery	Michael Stoute
1 July 2001	Irish Derby	12	The Curragh	1	411	4/1	12	3	8	2:27.10	Kieren Fallon	Michael Stoute
16 September 2001	Prix Niel	12	Longchamp	2	38	13/10	7	1	0.75	2:27.00	Kieren Fallon	Michael Stoute
7 October 2001	Prix de l'Arc de Triomphe	12	Longchamp	1	581	76/10	17	4	7	2:36.10	Kieren Fallon	Michael Stoute
25 November 2001	Japan Cup	12	Tokyo	1	1457	23/1	15	6	5	2:23.80	Johnny Murtagh	Michael Stoute
27 July 2002	King George VI & Queen Elizabeth Stakes	12	Ascot	1	435	11/2	9	1	Head	2.29.70	Kieren Fallon	Michael Stoute
20 August 2002	International Stakes	10.5	York	1	261	9/4	7	2	0.5	2:08.74	Kieren Fallon	Michael Stoute
26 October 2002	Breeders' Cup Turf	12	Arlington Park	1	861	37/10	8	6	5.75	2:30.00	Kieren Fallon	Michael Stoute
24 November 2002	Japan Cup	11	Nakayama	1	1328	186/10	16	7	2.75	2:12.20	Kieren Fallon	Michael Stoute

.

== Assessment ==
In the 2001 International Classification (the forerunner of the World Thoroughbred Racehorse Rankings) Golan was assigned a rating of 121 making him the sixth best three-year-old colt in Europe.

In the 2001 International Classification he was rated the third best horse with a rating of 126.

Timeform gave Golan a rating of 102p as a two-year-old, 125 as a three-year-old and a peak annual rating of 129 as a four-year-old.

== Stud career ==
Golan began his career as a stallion at the Coolmore stud at a fee of €20,000.

He has also been "shuttled" to stand at the Windsor Park Stud at Cambridge, New Zealand, for the Southern Hemisphere breeding season.

In 2007, he was moved to the Grange Stud, Fermoy, County Cork, where he was standing in 2011 at a fee of €2,000.

Golan's notable progeny include:

- Beauty Flash (2010 Hong Kong Mile),
- Kibbutz (2007 Victoria Derby)
- Regime (2007 Sandown Classic Trial and 2008 Mooresbridge Stakes).

The fact that Golan was marketed as a "dual-purpose" or National Hunt stallion has been seen by some observers as an example of poor breeding policy and an "obsession" with the Northern Dancer bloodline.

== Pedigree ==
Pedigree of Golan (IRE), bay stallion, 1998
Sire Spectrum (IRE) 1992	Rainbow Quest; 1981	Blushing Groom	Red God
Sire Spectrum (IRE) 1992	Rainbow Quest; 1981	Blushing Groom	Runaway Bride
Sire Spectrum (IRE) 1992	Rainbow Quest; 1981	I Will Follow	Herbager
Sire Spectrum (IRE) 1992	Rainbow Quest; 1981	I Will Follow	Where You Lead
Sire Spectrum (IRE) 1992	River Dancer; 1983	Irish River	Riverman
Sire Spectrum (IRE) 1992	River Dancer; 1983	Irish River	Irish Star
Sire Spectrum (IRE) 1992	River Dancer; 1983	Dancing Shadow	Dancer's Image
Sire Spectrum (IRE) 1992	River Dancer; 1983	Dancing Shadow	Sunny Valley
Dam Highland Gift (IRE) 1993	Generous; 1988	Caerleon	Nijinsky
Dam Highland Gift (IRE) 1993	Generous; 1988	Caerleon	Foreseer
Dam Highland Gift (IRE) 1993	Generous; 1988	Doff The Derby	Master Derby
Dam Highland Gift (IRE) 1993	Generous; 1988	Doff The Derby	Margarethen
Dam Highland Gift (IRE) 1993	Scots Lass; 1982	Shirley Heights	Mill Reef
Dam Highland Gift (IRE) 1993	Scots Lass; 1982	Shirley Heights	Hardiemma
Dam Highland Gift (IRE) 1993	Scots Lass; 1982	Edinburgh	Charlottown
Dam Highland Gift (IRE) 1993	Scots Lass; 1982	Edinburgh	Queen's Castle (Family: 5-h)
