= Beauty Flash =

New Zealand-bred racehorse

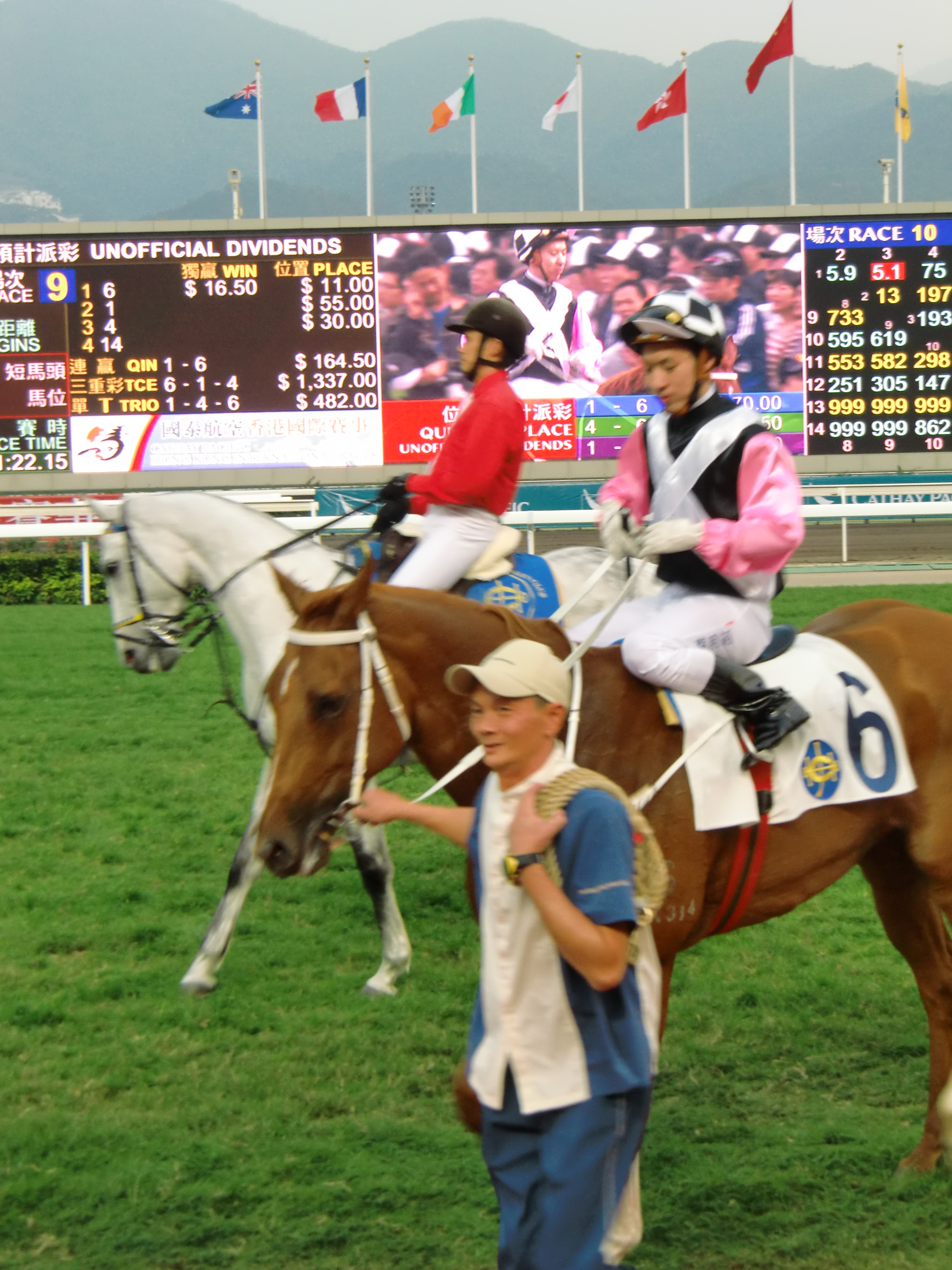
- Sire: Golan
- Grandsire: Spectrum
- Dam: Wychwood Rose
- Damsire: Volksraad
- Sex: Gelding
- Foaled: 16 November 2005
- Country: New Zealand
- Colour: Chestnut
- Breeder: Windsor Park Stud Ltd
- Owner: Kwok Siu Ming
- Trainer: Tony Cruz
- Record: 41:9-2-5
- Earnings: HKD$30,792,000

Major wins
- Hong Kong Classic Mile (2010); Hong Kong Mile (2010); Hong Kong Stewards' Cup (2011); Queen's Silver Jubilee Cup (2011)

Beauty Flash (Chinese: 締造美麗; foaled 16 November 2005) is a Hong Kong–based Thoroughbred racehorse.

In the season of 2009–2010, Beauty Flash won the HKG1 Mercedes-Benz Hong Kong Derby. He also is one of the nominees of Hong Kong Horse of the Year.

== Profile ==
- Sire: Golan
- Dam: Wychwood Rose
- Sex: Gelding
- Country : New Zealand
- Colour : Chestnut
- Owner : Kwok Siu Ming
- Trainer : Tony Cruz
- Record : (No. of 1-2-3-Starts) 9-2-5-41 (As of 18 May 2015)
- Earnings : HK$30,792,000 (As of 18 May 2015)
