= Prince of Wales's Stakes =

Flat horse race in Britain

- Class: Group 1
- Location: Ascot Racecourse; Ascot, England
- Inaugurated: 1862
- Race type: Flat / Thoroughbred
- Website: Ascot

Race information
- Distance: 1m 1f 212yd (2,004 metres)
- Surface: Turf
- Track: Right-handed
- Qualification: Four-years-old and up
- Weight: 9 st 2 lb Allowances; 3 lb for fillies and mares 2 lb for S. Hemisphere 4yo
- Purse: £1,057,000 (2025); 1st: £599,708

Prince Of Wales's Stakes
2026
Ombudsman	Minnie Hauk	Daryz

Previous years
2025
Ombudsman	Anmaat	See The Fire
2024
Auguste Rodin	Zarakem	Horizon Dore
2023
Mostahdaf	Luxembourg	Adayar
2022
State Of Rest	Bay Bridge	Grand Glory
2021
Love	Audarya	Armory

2020-2011
2020
Lord North	Addeybb	Barney Roy
2019
Crystal Ocean	Magical	Waldgeist
2018
Poet's Word	Cracksman	Hawkbill
2017
Highland Reel	Decorated Knight	Ulysses
2016
My Dream Boat	Found	Western Hymn
2015
Free Eagle	The Grey Gatsby	Western Hymn
2014
The Fugue	Magician	Treve
2013
Al Kazeem	Mukhadram	The Fugue
2012
So You Think	Carlton House	Farhh
2011
Rewilding	So You Think	Sri Putra

2010-2001
2010
Byword	Twice Over	Tazeez
2009
Vision D'etat	Tartan Bearer	Never On Sunday
2008
Duke Of Marmalade	Phoenix Tower	Pipedreamer
2007
Manduro	Dylan Thomas	Notnowcato
2006
Ouija Board	Electrocutionist	Manduro
2005
Azamour	Ace	Elvstroem
2004
Rakti	Powerscourt	Ikhtyar
2003
Nayef	Rakti	Islington
2002
Grandera	Indian Creek	Banks Hill
2001
Fantastic Light	Kalanisi	Hightori

2000-1991
2000
Dubai Millennium	Sumitas	Beat All
1999
Lear Spear	Fantastic Light	Xaar
1998
Faithful Son	Chester House	Daylami
1997
Bosra Sham	Alhaarth	London News
1996
First Island	Montjoy	Tamayaz
1995
Muhtarram	Eltish	Needle Gun
1994
Muhtarram	Ezzoud	Chatoyant
1993
Placerville	Urban Sea	Emperor Jones
1992
Perpendicular	Young Buster	Kooyonga
1991
Stagecraft	Zoman	Terimon

1990-1988
1990
Batshoof	Relief Pitcher	Terimon
1989
Two Timing	Beau Sher	Most Welcome
1988
Mtoto	Broken Hearted	Highland Chieftain

The Prince of Wales's Stakes is a Group 1 flat horse race in Great Britain open to horses aged four years or older. It is run at Ascot over a distance of 1 mile 1 furlong and 212 yards (2,004 metres), and it is scheduled to take place each year in June.

== History ==
The event was established in 1862, and it was named after the Prince of Wales at that time, the future King Edward VII. The original version was restricted to three-year-olds, and it was contested over 1 mile and 5 furlongs.

The race was discontinued after World War II, when there was no Prince of Wales. It returned in 1968, a year before the investiture of Prince Charles. The distance of the new version was 1 mile and 2 furlongs, and it was now open to horses aged three or older.

The present system of race grading was introduced in 1971, and for a period the Prince of Wales's Stakes was classed at Group 2 level. It was promoted to Group 1 status in 2000, and at this point the minimum age of participating horses was raised to four.

The Prince of Wales's Stakes is currently held on the second day of the five-day Royal Ascot meeting.

== Records ==
Most successful horse (2 wins):

- Connaught – 1969, 1970
- Mtoto – 1987, 1988
- Muhtarram – 1994, 1995
- Ombudsman - 2025, 2026

Leading jockey (6 wins):

- Morny Cannon – Matchmaker (1895), Shaddock (1896), Manners (1899), Simon Dale (1900), Rydal Head (1904), Plum Centre (1905)

Leading trainer (8 wins):

- John Porter – Ossory (1888), Watercress (1892), Matchmaker (1895), Shaddock (1896), Manners (1899), Simon Dale (1900), Rydal Head (1904), Plum Centre (1905)

Leading owner (7 wins):

- Godolphin – Faithful Son (1998), Dubai Millennium (2000), Fantastic Light (2001), Grandera (2002), Rewilding (2011), Ombudsman (2025, 2026)

== Winners since 1900 ==
Year	Winner	Age	Jockey	Trainer	Owner	Time
1900	Simon Dale	3	Mornington Cannon	John Porter		2:53.00
1901	Veronese	3	Fred Rickaby	Harry Enoch
1902	Ard Patrick (Note: Cupbearer finished first in 1902, but was disqualified for bumping and boring.)	3	Skeets Martin	Sam Darling	John Gubbins
1903	Mead	3
1904	Rydal Head	3	Mornington Cannon	John Porter
1905	Plum Centre	3	Mornington Cannon	John Porter
1906	Sancy	3	Otto Madden	Alec Taylor Jr.
1907	Qu'Appelle	3	Danny Maher	George Chaloner		2:49.00
1908	Santo Strato	3	Otto Madden	John Watson	Leopold de Rothschild
1909	Bayardo	3	Danny Maher	Alec Taylor Jr.	Alfred W. Cox
1910	Greenback	3	Fred Templeman	John Hallick
1911	Stedfast	3	Frank Wootton	George Lambton
1912	Catmint	3	Danny Maher	Tom Jennings Jr.		2:51.60
1913	Louvois	3	William Saxby	Dawson Waugh	Walter Raphael	2:47.20
1914	Marten	3	Fred Rickaby	Fred Darling		2:48.00
Race not held from 1915 to 1918
1919	Dominion	3	Arthur Smith	Frank Barling
1920	All Prince	3	Freddie Fox	Reg Day
1921	Polymester	3	Steve Donoghue	Etienne De Mestre
1922	Villars	3	Victor Smyth	Fred Hunt		2:44.00
1923	Eastern Monarch	3	Charlie Elliott	Jack Jarvis
1924	Sansovino	3	Tommy Weston	George Lambton	Lord Derby	2:51.00
1925	Warminster	3	George Archibald	G Sadler
1926	Caissot	3	Tommy Weston	George Lambton		3:01.20
1927	Chantery	3	Henri Jelliss	Alec Taylor Jr.		2:45.60
1928	Potocki	3	Fred Winter Sr.	Walter Earl		2:52.80
1929	Lyme Regis	3	Joe Childs	William Jarvis		2:52.40
1930	Parenthesis	3	Freddie Fox	Fred Darling		2:51.60
1931	Sir Andrew	3	Rufus Beasley	Cecil Boyd-Rochfort		2:49.00
1932	Sigiri	3	Charlie Elliott	Victor Gilpin		2:52.20
1933	Hyperion	3	Tommy Weston	George Lambton	Lord Derby	2:52.40
1934	Achtenan	3	Richard Perryman	Frank Butters	T Lant	2:51.00
1935	Assignation	3	Steve Donoghue	Len Cundell	Mrs C Glorney	2:54.60
1936	Valerian	3	Tommy Weston	Joseph Lawson	Sir Abe Bailey	2:46.60
1937	Cold Scent	3	Tommy Weston	Joseph Lawson	Sir Abe Bailey	2:49.20
1938	L'Ouragan III	3	Roger Brethès	Henry Count	Princesse de Faucigny-Lucinge	2:46.40
1939	Heliopolis	3	Richard Perryman	Walter Earl	Lord Derby	2:48.80
Race not held from 1940 to 1967
1968	Royal Palace	4	Sandy Barclay	Noel Murless	Jim Joel	2:22.30
1969	Connaught	4	Sandy Barclay	Noel Murless	Jim Joel	2:08.00
1970	Connaught	5	Sandy Barclay	Noel Murless	Jim Joel	2:07.30
1971	Arthur	4	Ron Hutchinson	John Dunlop	Lady Rosebery	2:19.80
1972	Brigadier Gerard	4	Joe Mercer	Dick Hern	Jean Hislop	2:06.30
1973	Gift Card	4	Lester Piggott	Angel Penna Sr.	Margit Batthyány	2:09.40
1974	Admetus	4	Maurice Philliperon	John Cunnington	Michael Sobell	2:09.60
1975	Record Run	4	Pat Eddery	Gavin Pritchard-Gordon	Sidney Grey	2:03.30
1976	Annes Pretender (Note: Trepan finished first in 1976, but was disqualified after testing positive for a banned substance.)	4	Lester Piggott	Ryan Price	Charles Clore	2:03.30
1977	Lucky Wednesday	4	Joe Mercer	Henry Cecil	Charles St George	2:16.10
1978	Gunner B	5	Joe Mercer	Henry Cecil	Pauline Barratt	2:08.00
1979	Crimson Beau	4	Lester Piggott	Paul Cole	H. Spearing	2:06.80
1980	Ela-Mana-Mou	4	Willie Carson	Dick Hern	Simon Weinstock	2:10.57
1981	Hard Fought	4	Walter Swinburn	Michael Stoute	Brook Holliday	2:05.80
1982	Kind of Hush	4	Steve Cauthen	Barry Hills	Tony Shead	2:09.30
1983	Stanerra	5	Brian Rouse	Frank Dunne	Frank Dunne	2:06.50
1984	Morcon	4	Willie Carson	Dick Hern	2nd Baron Rotherwick	2:06.91
1985	Bob Back	4	Bruce Raymond	Michael Jarvis	Antonio Balzarini	2:05.90
1986	English Spring	4	Pat Eddery	Ian Balding	Paul Mellon	2:08.80
1987	Mtoto	4	Richard Hills	Alec Stewart	Ahmed Al Maktoum	2:07.27
1988	Mtoto	5	Michael Roberts	Alec Stewart	Ahmed Al Maktoum	2:12.84
1989	Two Timing	3	Pat Eddery	Jeremy Tree	Khalid Abdullah	2:04.90
1990	Batshoof	4	Pat Eddery	Ben Hanbury	Muttar Salem	2:06.72
1991	Stagecraft	4	Steve Cauthen	Michael Stoute	Sheikh Mohammed	2:07.58
1992	Perpendicular (Note: Kooyonga finished first in 1992, but she was relegated to third place following a stewards' inquiry)	4	Willie Ryan	Henry Cecil	Lord Howard de Walden	2:04.13
1993	Placerville	3	Pat Eddery	Henry Cecil	Khalid Abdullah	2:08.65
1994	Muhtarram	5	Willie Carson	John Gosden	Hamdan Al Maktoum	2:05.11
1995	Muhtarram	6	Willie Carson	John Gosden	Hamdan Al Maktoum	2:04.94
1996	First Island	4	Michael Hills	Geoff Wragg	Mollers Racing	2:02.76
1997	Bosra Sham	4	Kieren Fallon	Henry Cecil	Wafic Saïd	2:04.16
1998	Faithful Son	4	John Reid	Saeed bin Suroor	Godolphin	2:08.30
1999	Lear Spear	4	Michael Kinane	David Elsworth	Raymond Tooth	2:04.37
2000	Dubai Millennium	4	Jerry Bailey	Saeed bin Suroor	Godolphin	2:07.48
2001	Fantastic Light	5	Frankie Dettori	Saeed bin Suroor	Godolphin	2:04.40
2002	Grandera	4	Frankie Dettori	Saeed bin Suroor	Godolphin	2:04.43
2003	Nayef	5	Richard Hills	Marcus Tregoning	Hamdan Al Maktoum	2:05.30
2004	Rakti	5	Philip Robinson	Michael Jarvis	Gary A. Tanaka	2:04.95
2005 (Note: The 2005 running took place at York)	Azamour	4	Michael Kinane	John Oxx	HH Aga Khan IV	2:08.15
2006	Ouija Board	5	Olivier Peslier	Ed Dunlop	19th Earl of Derby	2:06.92
2007	Manduro	5	Stéphane Pasquier	André Fabre	Baron G. von Ullmann	2:05.91
2008	Duke of Marmalade	4	Johnny Murtagh	Aidan O'Brien	Magnier / Tabor	2:05.35
2009	Vision d'Etat	4	Olivier Peslier	Eric Libaud	Detré / Libaud	2:06.90
2010	Byword	4	Maxime Guyon	André Fabre	Khalid Abdullah	2:05.35
2011	Rewilding	4	Frankie Dettori	Mahmood Al Zarooni	Godolphin	2:04.24
2012	So You Think	6	Joseph O'Brien	Aidan O'Brien	Derrick Smith et al.	2:03.86
2013	Al Kazeem	5	James Doyle	Roger Charlton	John Deer	2:03.06
2014	The Fugue	5	William Buick	John Gosden	Andrew Lloyd Webber	2:01.90
2015	Free Eagle	4	Pat Smullen	Dermot Weld	Moyglare Stud	2:05.07
2016	My Dream Boat	4	Adam Kirby	Clive Cox	Paul & Clare Rooney	2:11.38
2017	Highland Reel	5	Ryan Moore	Aidan O'Brien	Magnier / Tabor/ Smith	2:05.04
2018	Poet's Word	5	James Doyle	Michael Stoute	Saeed Suhail	2:03.51
2019	Crystal Ocean	5	Frankie Dettori	Michael Stoute	Evelyn de Rothschild	2:10.25
2020	Lord North	4	James Doyle	John Gosden	Zayed bin Mohammed	2:05.63
2021	Love	4	Ryan Moore	Aidan O'Brien	Magnier / Tabor/ Smith	2:06.86
2022	State Of Rest	4	Shane Crosse	Joseph O'Brien	State Of Rest Partnership	2:07.79
2023	Mostahdaf	5	Jim Crowley	John & Thady Gosden	Shadwell Estate	2:05.95
2024	Auguste Rodin	4	Ryan Moore	Aidan O'Brien	Tabor / Smith / Magnier / Westerberg	2:03.12
2025	Ombudsman	4	William Buick	John & Thady Gosden	Godolphin	2:02.51
2026	Ombudsman	5	William Buick	John & Thady Gosden	Godolphin	2:03.24

== Earlier winners ==
- 1862: Carisbrook
- 1863: Avenger
- 1864: Ely
- 1865: Breadalbane
- 1866: Rustic
- 1867: Vauban
- 1868: King Alfred
- 1869: Martyrdom
- 1870: King o'Scots
- 1871: King of the Forest
- 1872: Queen's Messenger
- 1873: Kaiser
- 1874: Leolinus
- 1875: Earl of Dartrey
- 1876: Petrarch
- 1877: Glen Arthur
- 1878: Glengarry
- 1879: Wheel of Fortune
- 1880: Zealot
- 1881: Iroquois
- 1882: Quicklime
- 1883: Galliard
- 1884: Sir Reuben
- 1885: Pepper and Salt
- 1886: Button Park
- 1887: Claymore
- 1888: Ossory
- 1889: Donovan
- 1890: Alloway
- 1891: Melody
- 1892: Watercress
- 1893: Red Ensign
- 1894: Contract
- 1895: Matchmaker
- 1896: Shaddock
- 1897: Galtee More
- 1898: Jeddah
- 1899: Manners

== See also ==
- Horse racing in Great Britain
- List of British flat horse races
