= British Horseracing Board =

From 10 June 1993 until 30 July 2007, the British Horseracing Board (BHB) was the governing authority for horseracing in Great Britain. It was created in 1993, and took on responsibilities previously held by the Jockey Club. This was intended to help modernise the sport, as the Jockey Club is a private members' club with a traditionally aristocratic membership, and was seen by some as being unaccountable and a relic of the tradition of amateurism in British sports administration. The Jockey Club however retained responsibility for matters concerned with the regulation of the sport, such as integrity, discipline and equine health. The British Horseracing Board focused on organising and promoting the sport and enhancing its commercial position. This was an extract from its statement of aims published in 2006:

As the Governing Authority for Racing, we will promote the interests of our sport and industry in whatever way we can.... We will work to attract and retain more racehorse owners, racegoers and other customers. We will seek to maintain and promote horseracing as a competitive and attractive sport and betting medium. We also wish to see the best possible training and working conditions for those employed in the industry, and the highest possible standards of care for horses.

The BHB was merged with the Horseracing Regulatory Authority (HRA), the regulatory division of the Jockey Club, in 2007, creating a new organisation called the British Horseracing Authority which from 31 July 2007 governs and regulates the sport. As a result, the Jockey Club has formally ended its link with the regulation of the sport.

The British Horseracing Board ceased to exist on 31 July 2007.

== Database litigation ==
The British Horseracing Board was the claimant in a notable case involving the European Union Database Directive. At dispute was the re‑use of the contents of their horseracing information subscription service by other parties. The European Court of Justice ruled that the resources used for the creation of materials which make up the contents of a database are not protected and BHB lost their case.
