= World's Best Racehorse Rankings =

Annual world ranking of horses

The Longines World's Best Racehorse Rankings (LWBRR), known as World Thoroughbred Racehorse Rankings (WTRR) before 2012, are a horseracing ranking.

According to the IFHA website, "The IFHA World Thoroughbred Racehorse Rankings are the official assessment of the top performers." In 1977, France, Great Britain and Ireland published the first internationally agreed assessment of racing merit on behalf of the European Pattern Committee under the banner of the International Classifications. In 1985, Germany and Italy joined the system, to be followed by North America (both Canada and the United States) and Japan in the mid 1990s.

The highest-rated horse is honored as the Longines World's Best Racehorse during the Longines World Racing Awards, which also celebrates the Longines World's Best Horse Race each year.

Related Awards

The ratings for the horses are also critical to establishing two other awards that are given out by the International Federation of Horse Racing Authorities: the aforementioned Longines World's Best Horse Race and the Longines World's Best Jockey.

The Longines World's Best Horse Race award recognizes the best-rated race of the highest-rated Group 1 international races as established by a panel of international handicappers. The ratings of the top four finishers in each race serve as basis for the assessment. Introduced in 2015, the award was won by the Prix de l'Arc de Triomphe in 2015, 2017, 2018, 2019, and 2021. The Breeders' Cup Classic won in 2016 and 2022, while the Juddmonte International won the title in 2020 and 2024. In 2023, the Japan Cup in association with Longines was named the World's Best Horse Race. The Japan Cup shared the title with the QIPCO Champion Stakes in 2025. Additionally, the IFHA releases the top 100 Group/Grade 1 races each year.

The Longines World's Best Jockey is named each December. Performances in the top 100 Group 1 and Grade 1 races serve as the base of this annual competition to recognize top jockeys throughout the world. Frankie Dettori has won the award four times, as he was named the Longines World's Best Jockey in 2015, 2018, 2019, and 2020. Ryan Moore has also won it four times, as he took the inaugural contest in 2014 as well as the 2016, 2021, and 2023 editions. James McDonald won the title in 2022, 2024, and 2025 while Hugh Bowman won the title in 2017.

== Top ranked horses ==
Year	Rating	Horse	Age	Trainer	Owner	Race	Ref
2003	133	Hawk Wing (USA)	4	Aidan O'Brien (IRE)	Susan Magnier (IRE)	Lockinge Stakes (GB)	
2004	130	Ghostzapper (USA)	4	Robert J. Frankel (USA)	Stronach Stables (CAN)	Breeders' Cup Classic (USA)	
2005	130	Hurricane Run (IRE)	3	André Fabre (FR)	Michael Tabor (GB)	Prix de l'Arc de Triomphe (FR)	
2006	129	Invasor (ARG)	4	Kiaran McLaughlin (USA)	Shadwell Stable (UAE)	Breeders' Cup Classic (USA)	
2007	131	Manduro (GER)	5	André Fabre (FR)	Georg Baron von Ullmann (GER)	Prince of Wales's Stakes (GB)	
2008	130	Curlin (USA)	4	Steven M. Asmussen (USA)	Stonestreet Stables LLC (USA)	Dubai World Cup (UAE)	
2008	130	Curlin (USA)	4	Steven M. Asmussen (USA)	Stonestreet Stables LLC (USA)	Stephen Foster Handicap (USA)	
2008	130	New Approach (IRE)	3	James S. Bolger (IRE)	Princess Haya bint Hussein (JOR)	Champion Stakes (GB)	
2009	136	Sea The Stars (IRE)	3	John Oxx (IRE)	Christopher Tsui (HK)	Irish Champion Stakes (IRE)	
2010	135	Harbinger (GB)	4	Michael Stoute (GB)	Highclere Thoroughbred Racing (GB)	King George VI & Queen Elizabeth Stakes (GB)	
2011	136	Frankel (GB)	3	Henry Cecil (GB)	Prince Khalid bin Abdullah Al Saud (KSA)	Sussex Stakes (GB)	
2012	140	Frankel (GB)	4	Henry Cecil (GB)	Prince Khalid bin Abdullah Al Saud (KSA)	Queen Anne Stakes (GB)	
2012	140	Frankel (GB)	4	Henry Cecil (GB)	Prince Khalid bin Abdullah Al Saud (KSA)	International Stakes (GB)	
2013	130	Treve (FR)	3	Criquette Head-Maarek (FR)	Sheikh Joaan bin Hamad Al Thani (QAT)	Prix de l'Arc de Triomphe (FR)	
2013	130	Black Caviar (AUS)	6	Peter Moody (AUS)	G. J. Wilkie, K. J. Wilkie (AUS), Werrett Bloodstock Pty, Ltd. (AUS) et al.	TJ Smith Stakes (AUS)	
2013	130	Black Caviar (AUS)	6	Peter Moody (AUS)	G. J. Wilkie, K. J. Wilkie (AUS), Werrett Bloodstock Pty, Ltd. (AUS) et al.	Black Caviar Lightning (AUS)	
2014	130	Just A Way (JPN)	5	Naosuke Sugai (JPN)	Akatsuki Yamatoya (JPN)	Dubai Duty Free (UAE)	
2015	134	American Pharoah (USA)	3	Bob Baffert (USA)	Ahmed Zayat (EGY)	Breeders' Cup Classic (USA)	
2016	134	Arrogate (USA)	3	Bob Baffert (USA)	Juddmonte (KSA)	Breeders' Cup Classic (USA)	
2017	134	Arrogate (USA)	4	Bob Baffert (USA)	Juddmonte (KSA)	Dubai World Cup (UAE)	
2018	130	Cracksman (GB)	4	John Gosden (GB)	Anthony Oppenheimer (GB)	Champion Stakes (GB)	
2018	130	Winx (AUS)	6	Chris Waller (AUS)	Magic Bloodstock Racing (AUS), R. G. Treweeke & D. N. Kepitis (AUS)	Queen Elizabeth Stakes (AUS)	
2019	128	Crystal Ocean (GB)	5	Michael Stoute (GB)	Evelyn de Rothschild (GB)	Prince of Wales's Stakes (GB)	
2019	128	Enable (GB)	5	John Gosden (GB)	Prince Khalid bin Abdullah Al Saud (KSA)	King George VI & Queen Elizabeth Stakes (GB)	
2019	128	Waldgeist (GB)	5	André Fabre (FR)	Gestüt Ammerland (GER), Newsells Park (GB)	Prix de l'Arc de Triomphe (FR)	
2020	130	Ghaiyyath (IRE)	5	Charlie Appleby (GB)	Godolphin (UAE)	International Stakes (GB)	
2021	129	Knicks Go (USA)	5	Brad H. Cox (USA)	Korea Racing Authority (KOR)	Breeders' Cup Classic (USA)	
2022	140	Flightline (USA)	4	John W. Sadler (USA)	Hronis Racing LLC (USA), West Point Thoroughbreds (USA) et al.	Pacific Classic (USA)	
2023	135	Equinox (JPN)	4	Tetsuya Kimura (JPN)	Silk Racing (JPN)	Japan Cup (JPN)	
2024	128	City of Troy (USA)	3	Aidan O'Brien (IRE)	Susan Magnier (IRE), Michael Tabor & Derick Smith (GB)	International Stakes (GB)	
2024	128	Laurel River (USA)	6	Bhupat Seemar (UAE)	Juddmonte (KSA)	Dubai World Cup (UAE)	
2025	130	Calandagan (IRE)	4	Francis-Henri Graffard (FR)	Aga Khan Studs SCEA (FR)	Champion Stakes (GB)	

- Horse names are followed by a suffix indicating the country where foaled.
