= 2013 King George VI and Queen Elizabeth Stakes =

63rd King George VI and Queen Elizabeth Stakes
- King George VI and Queen Elizabeth Stakes
- Novellist Trading Leather Hillstar
- Location: Ascot Racecourse
- Date: 27 July 2013
- Winning horse: Novellist (IRE)
- Jockey: Johnny Murtagh
- Trainer: Andreas Wohler (GER)
- Owner: Christoph Berglar

The 2013 King George VI and Queen Elizabeth Stakes was a horse race held at Ascot Racecourse on Saturday 27 July 2013. It was the 63rd King George VI and Queen Elizabeth Stakes.

The winner was Christoph Berglar's Novellist, a four-year-old bay colt trained in Germany by Andrea Wohler and ridden by Johnny Murtagh. Novellist's victory was the fourth in the race for Murtagh and the first for his trainer and owner. It was the second consecutive success for a German-trained horse following the victory of Danedream in 2012.

Novellist was an established international performer, having won the Gran Premio di Milano in Italy in October 2012 and the Grand Prix de Saint-Cloud in France in June 2013. In the 2013 King George VI and Queen Elizabeth Stakes, Novellist, starting at odds of 13/2, took the lead a quarter of a mile from a finish and drew clear in the closing stages and won by five lengths from the Irish colt Trading Leather. The British colt Hillstar finished third ahead of the French-trained favourite Cirrus des Aigles.

This was the first running of the race to be shown on Channel 4; the BBC had shown the race every year from 1951 to 2012.

== Race details ==
- Sponsor: Betfair
- Purse: £1,047,641; First prize: £603,961
- Surface: Turf
- Going: Good to Firm
- Distance: 12 furlongs
- Number of runners: 8
- Winner's time: 2:24.60

== Full result ==
Pos.	Marg.	Horse (bred)	Age	Jockey	Trainer (Country)	Odds
1		Novellist (IRE)	4	Johnny Murtagh	Andreas Wohler (GER)	13/2
2	5	Trading Leather (IRE)	3	Kevin Manning	Jim Bolger (IRE)	9/2
3	¾	Hillstar (GB)	3	Ryan Moore	Michael Stoute (GB)	5/1
4	3	Cirrus des Aigles (FR)	7	Christophe Soumillon	Corine Barande-Barbe (FR)	6/4 fav
5	hd	Universal (IRE)	4	Joe Fanning	Mark Johnston (GB)	14/1
6	5	Red Cadeaux (GB)	7	Graham Lee	Ed Dunlop (GB)	25/1
7	7	Very Nice Name (FR)	4	Olivier Peslier	A. de Mieulle (FR)	14/1
8	36	Ektihaam (IRE)	4	Dane O'Neill	Roger Varian (GB)	10/1

- Abbreviations: nse = nose; nk = neck; shd = head; hd = head

== Winner's details ==
Further details of the winner, Novellist

- Sex: Colt
- Foaled: 10 March 2009
- Country: Ireland
- Sire: Monsun; Dam: Night Lagoon (Lagunas)
- Owner: Christoph Berglar
- Breeder: Christoph Berglar

== Subsequent breeding careers ==
Leading progeny of participants in the 2013 King George VI and Queen Elizabeth Stakes.

Novellist (1st) - Last Draft (1st Keisei Hai 2019)
Universal (5th) - Minor flat and jumps winners
Very Nice Name (7th) - Minor flat runners
Hillstar (3rd) - Progeny yet to race
