= Maxios (horse) =

British-bred Thoroughbred racehorse

- Sire: Monsun
- Grandsire: Königsstuhl
- Dam: Moonlight's Box
- Damsire: Nureyev
- Sex: Stallion
- Foaled: 5 April 2008
- Country: United Kingdom
- Colour: Bay or brown
- Breeder: Niarchos family
- Owner: Niarchos family
- Trainer: Jonathan Pease
- Record: 18: 8-2-0
- Earnings: £585,690

Major wins
- Prix Thomas Bryon (2010); La Coupe de Maisons-Laffitte (2012); Prix d'Harcourt (2013); Prix d'Ispahan (2013); Prix du Moulin (2013)

Maxios (foaled 5 April 2008) is a British-bred Thoroughbred racehorse and sire. He showed great promise as a juvenile in 2010 when he was unbeaten in two races including the Group 3 Prix Thomas Bryon but in the following year he failed to win or place in four starts. In 2012 he showed improvement, winning two minor races in spring and then taking La Coupe de Maisons-Laffitte in September. He reached his peak as a five-year-old in 2013 when he won the Prix d'Harcourt and went on to record Group 1 victories in the Prix d'Ispahan and the Prix du Moulin. At the end of the year he was retired from racing to become a breeding stallion in Germany.

== Background ==
Maxios is a bay or brown horse bred in the United Kingdom by his owners, the Niarchos family. He was sent into training with Jonathan Pease in France.

She was sired by the German stallion Monsun, who won the Aral-Pokal and two editions of the Preis von Europa. He went on to be a successful breeding stallion, siring Shirocco, Manduro, Estimate and Stacelita. Maxios's dam Moonlight's Box never raced but was a very successful broodmare who also produced the Prix de l'Arc de Triomphe winner Bago. Her dam Coup de Genie won the Prix Morny and was a full-sister to Machiavellian.

== Racing career ==
=== 2010: two-year-old season ===
Maxios was ridden in both of his races as a juvenile by Christophe Lemaire. The colt made his debut in a maiden race over 1600 metres at Longchamp Racecourse on 18 September and won by four lengths from Soviet Blue. On 7 October the colt was stepped up in class to contest the Group 3 Prix Thomas Bryon over the same distance on heavy ground at Saint-Cloud Racecourse. Starting the 1.2/1 favourite he raced in third place before finishing strongly and took the lead in the final strides to win by a short head from Private Jet.

=== 2011: three-year-old season ===
Stéphane Pasquier took over as Maxios's jockey in the 2011 season but the colt showed little worthwhile form in his four races. He ran last of five in the Prix La Force over 2100 metres at Longchamp in April and finished eighth of nine behind Pour Moi in the Prix Greffulhe over 2000 metres at Saint-Cloud in May. After a lengthy break Maxios returned to the track in autumn and was dropped to Listed class for his last two races of the year. He finished fifth in the Prix Turenne over 2400 metres at Saint-Cloud in September and seventh when favourite for the Prix Vulcain over 2500 metres at Deauville Racecourse in the following month.

=== 2012: four-year-old season ===
Maxios began his third season with a three and a half length win in a minor race over 2000 metres at Longchamp and followed up by coming home five lengths clear of his rivals in a similar event at Fontainebleau a month later. In June he was stepped back up in class for the Group 2 Grand Prix de Chantilly and was in the first two throughout before being beaten three quarters of a length by the British-trained Aiken with the favourite Dunaden in third.

After a two-month break he was made odds-on favourite for the Prix Gontaut-Biron at Deauville but was outpaced in the closing stages and came home fifth of the seven runners behind Don Bosco. At Maisons-Laffitte Racecourse Maxios started 4.2/1 second favourite behind Reliable Man in La Coupe de Maisons-Laffitte over 2000 metres. After tracking the front-running Quinindo he took the lead approaching the last 200 metres and won "comfortably" by one and a half lengths from Reliable Man. On his final run of the season he started second favourite for the Prix Dollar at Longchamp in October but came home sixth, more than eleven lengths behind the winner Cirrus des Aigles.

=== 2013: five-year-old season ===
On 7 April at Longchamp Maxios began his 2013 campaign in the Group 3 Prix d'Harcourt over 2000 metres. After racing in third place he made rapid progress in the straight, caught the front-running Don Bosco close to the finish and won by three quarters of a length. Three weeks later at the same track he contested his first Group 1 race and finished second to the German colt Pastorius in the Prix Ganay. In the Group 1 Prix d'Ispahan over 1800 metres at Longchamp on 26 May Maxios started second favourite behind the filly Beauty Parlour (Poule d'Essai des Pouliches) in a seven-runner field which also included Don Bosco, Planteur (Prix Ganay) and Sofast (Prix La Rochette). He raced in mid-division he was switched to the outside in the straight, caught Planteur in the final strides and won by half a length. In June Maxios raced outside France for the first time when he was sent to Royal Ascot to contest the Prince of Wales's Stakes and came home sixth of the eleven runners behind Al Kazeem.

After a break of almost three months Maxios returned in the Prix Moulin over 1600 metres on soft ground at Longchamp on 15 September. The British colt Olympic Glory started favourite ahead of Flotilla (Poule d'Essai des Pouliches) with Maxios the 7/1 joint-third choice alongside Style Vendôme (Poule d'Essai des Poulains). Flotilla's pacemaker Sage Melody set off in front and opened up a long lead from Maxios, who was in turn well clear of the other five runners. Maxios went to the front when Sage Melody faded 400 metres from the finish and was never seriously challenged thereafter, coming home five lengths clear of Olympic Glory. Maxios ended his racing career with a return to Ascot for the Queen Elizabeth II Stakes over one mile on 19 October. He started the 4/1 second favourite in a twelve-runner field but was never in contention and came home eighth, twenty-six lengths behind the winner Olympic Glory.

In the 2013 World's Best Racehorse Rankings Maxios was rated the twenty-ninth best racehorse in the world.

== Stud record ==
Maxios was retired from racing to become a breeding stallion at the Gestut Fahrhof in Germany. His first foals were born in 2015.

=== Notable progeny ===
c = colt, f = filly, g = gelding

Foaled	Name	Sex	Major wins
2016	Diamanta	f	Preis der Diana

== Pedigree ==
Pedigree of Maxios (GB), Bay or brown stallion, 2008
Sire Monsun (GER) 1990	Konigsstuhl; 1976	Dschingis Khan	Tamerlane
Sire Monsun (GER) 1990	Konigsstuhl; 1976	Dschingis Khan	Donna Diana
Sire Monsun (GER) 1990	Konigsstuhl; 1976	Konigskronung	Tiepoletto
Sire Monsun (GER) 1990	Konigsstuhl; 1976	Konigskronung	Kronung
Sire Monsun (GER) 1990	Mosella; 1985	Surumu	Literat
Sire Monsun (GER) 1990	Mosella; 1985	Surumu	Surama
Sire Monsun (GER) 1990	Mosella; 1985	Monashia	Authi (IRE)
Sire Monsun (GER) 1990	Mosella; 1985	Monashia	Monacensia
Dam Moonlight's Box (USA) 1996	Nureyev; 1977	Northern Dancer (CAN)	Nearctic
Dam Moonlight's Box (USA) 1996	Nureyev; 1977	Northern Dancer (CAN)	Natalma (USA)*
Dam Moonlight's Box (USA) 1996	Nureyev; 1977	Special	Forli (ARG)
Dam Moonlight's Box (USA) 1996	Nureyev; 1977	Special	Thong
Dam Moonlight's Box (USA) 1996	Coup de Genie; 1991	Mr Prospector	Raise a Native
Dam Moonlight's Box (USA) 1996	Coup de Genie; 1991	Mr Prospector	Gold Digger
Dam Moonlight's Box (USA) 1996	Coup de Genie; 1991	Coup de Folie	Halo
Dam Moonlight's Box (USA) 1996	Coup de Genie; 1991	Coup de Folie	Raise the Standard (CAN)* (family: 2-d)

* Maxios is inbred 4D x 5D to the mare Natalma, meaning that she appears fourth generation and fifth generation (via Raise the Standard) on the dam side of his pedigree.
