= Novellist (horse) =

Irish-bred Thoroughbred racehorse

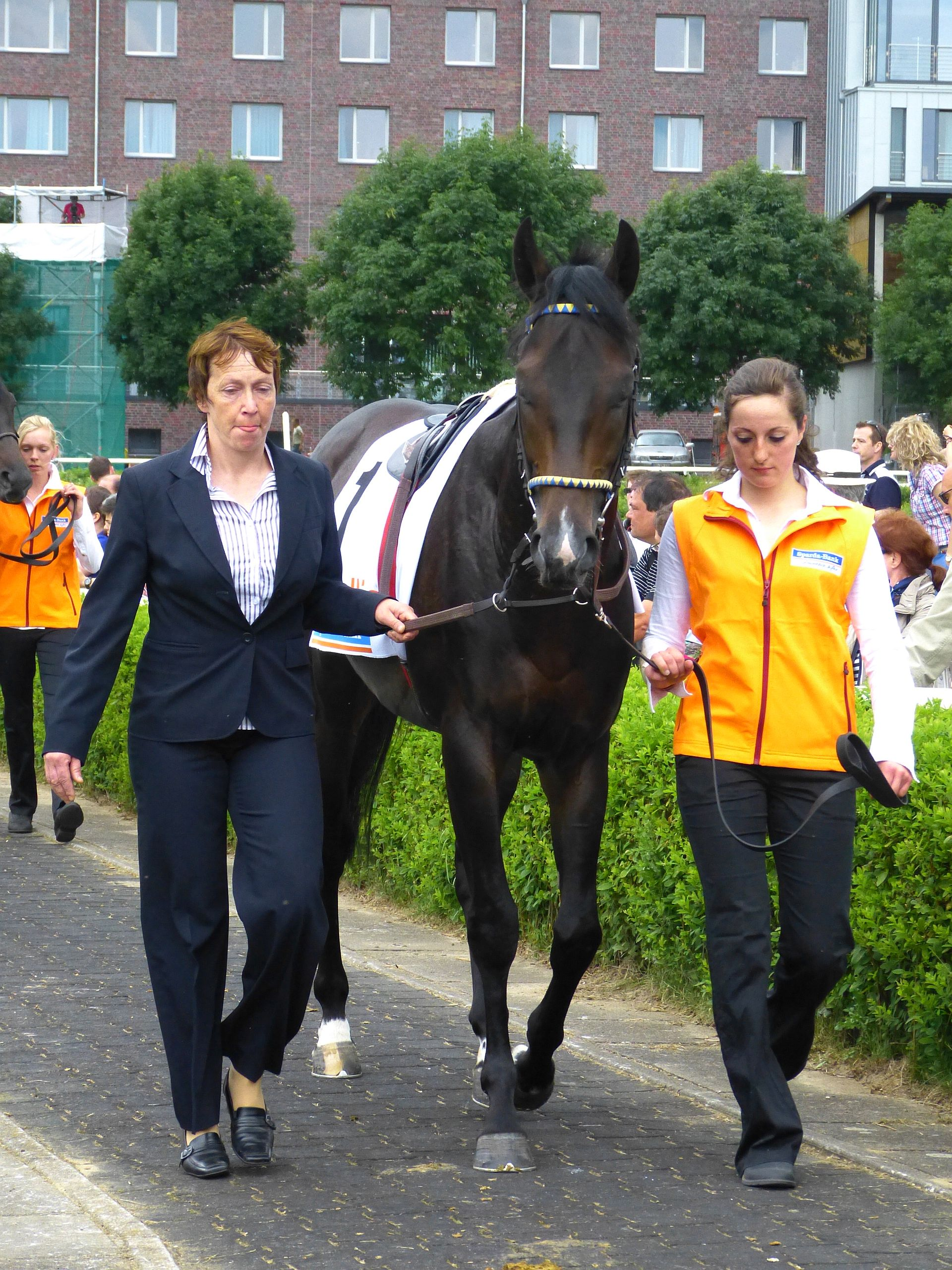
- Novellist at Hamburg in 2012
- Sire: Monsun
- Grandsire: Königsstuhl
- Dam: Night Lagoon
- Damsire: Lagunas
- Sex: Stallion
- Foaled: 10 March 2009
- Country: Ireland
- Colour: Bay or Brown
- Breeder: Christoph Berglar
- Owner: Christoph Berglar
- Trainer: Andreas Wohler
- Record: 11: 9-1-0
- Earnings: £1,177,788

Major wins
- Frühjahrs Dreijährigen-Preis (2012); Union-Rennen (2012); Gran Premio del Jockey Club (2012); Grosser Preis der Badischen Unternehmen (2013); Grand Prix de Saint-Cloud (2013); King George VI and Queen Elizabeth Stakes (2013); Grosser Preis von Baden (2013)

Awards
- German Horse of the Year (2013)

Novellist is an Irish-bred, German-trained Thoroughbred racehorse and sire. He won major races in four countries including the Gran Premio del Jockey Club in Italy, the Grand Prix de Saint-Cloud in France, the King George VI and Queen Elizabeth Stakes in the United Kingdom and the Grosser Preis von Baden in Germany. He was rated the fifth-best racehorse in the world and was voted German Horse of the Year for his performances in 2013.

== Background ==
Novellist is a dark bay or brown horse with a white snip and three white socks bred in Ireland by his owner Christoph Berglar. He was sired by Monsun (1990–2012), a dual winner of the Preis von Europa who went on to become a highly successful breeding stallion. His other progeny include Manduro, Stacelita and Shirocco. Novellist's dam Night Lagoon won the Preis der Winterkönigin in 2003.

The colt was sent into training with Andreas Wohler at Ravensberg, between Dortmund and Hanover. In his early races Novellist was ridden by the Panamanian jockey Eduardo Pedroza.

== Racing career ==
=== 2011: two-year-old season ===
On his only appearance as a two-year-old, Novellist contested a minor race over 1500 metres at Düsseldorf and won by eight lengths from five opponents.

=== 2012: three-year-old season ===
Novellist made his three-year-old debut over 1600 metres at Hoppegarten. He started at odds of 1/5 in a field of nine and won by five lengths. On 6 May he was moved up in class for the Group Three Frühjahrs Dreijährigen-Preis over 2000 metres at Frankfurt. Pedroza restrained the colt at the back of the field before moving up to challenge for the lead in the straight. He took the lead 300 metres from the finish and accelerated clear of his opponents to win by six lengths.

On 10 June, Novellist was moved up to Group Two class for the Union-Rennen over 2200 metre at Cologne. In a repeat of his tactics at Frankfurt, Pedroza held up the colt among the backmarkers before moving forward in the straight. In the closing stages he broke clear of the field and won in "very impressive" style by five lengths. On 2 July Novellist started 4/6 favourite for the Group One Deutsches Derby at Hamburg. He took the lead inside the last 100 metres but was overtaken and beaten half a length by the 25/1 outsider Pastorius. Wohler said afterwards: "Novellist ran a good race, but he was a bit phlegmatic today", while Berglar, said: "That's racing!".

After a two-month break, Novellist was matched against older horses for the first time in the Grosser Preis von Baden. Ridden by the British-based Norwegian-born jockey William Buick, he finished fourth of the seven runners behind Danedream, Ovambo Queen and Pastorius. On his final start of the season, Novellist was sent to Italy to contest the Gran Premio del Jockey Club over 2400 metres in Milan. He started 8/13 favourite and won easily by four and a half lengths from the Australian-bred Retrieve.

=== 2013: four-year-old season ===
Novellist made his first appearance as a four-year-old in the Grosser Preis der Badischen Unternehmen over 2200 metres at Baden-Baden on 12 May. He won by a head from the 2011 Deutsches Derby winner Waldpark, to whom he was conceding six pounds.

On 23 June, Novellist was sent to France for the Group One Grand Prix de Saint-Cloud. Ridden by Ryan Moore he took the lead 400 metres from the finish and won by one and a quarter lengths from Dunaden, with the favourite Cirrus des Aigles in fifth place. Commenting on his colt's victory, Wohler said: "That was great. He had a perfect run round and Ryan even said he got to the front a little bit too soon. Even though he was in front sooner than he wanted to be, he finished well and we are very happy."

Novellist was then sent to the United Kingdom to contest Britain's most prestigious weight-for-age race, the King George VI and Queen Elizabeth Stakes over one and a half miles at Ascot Racecourse. The colt was racing on firm ground for the first time but Wohler had no doubts about Novellist's ability to cope, saying: "He is a very good-moving horse, and his action was impressive in the gallop. If the ground is fast on Saturday, that is not really a concern. I expect him to run well". He was ridden by the veteran Irish jockey Johnny Murtagh after Ryan Moore was claimed to ride the three-year-old Hillstar. Novellist the 13/2 fourth choice in the betting behind Cirrus des Aigles, Trading Leather and Hillstar. He was settled in fourth place as fast pace was set by Ektihaam and Universal, before moving up to take the lead in the straight. He accelerated clear of the field and won easily by five lengths from Trading Leather in a course record time of 2:24.6. The win was the second successive win in the race for Germany, following Danedream in 2012. After the race Wohler said "I used to come to Ascot to watch the King George as a kid on my holidays, now I'm here winning it. One of our strengths is we have horses who mature later and when stepped up in distance. I was confident as I knew he had improved since his last race but I didn't expect him to win by five lengths." Wohler went on to indicate that the colt would next appear in the Grosser Preis von Baden before running in the Prix de l'Arc de Triomphe. Murtagh called the winner "a very high-class horse with a good engine" and said that his only difficulty came when attempting to pull the horse up after crossing the finish line.

Novellist reappeared in the Grosser Preis von Baden on 1 September and started the 3/10 favourite against four opponents. He led from the start and pulled hard against Pedroza's efforts to restrain him before he was overtaken by his stable companion Seismos at half way. He regained the lead from Seismos inside the last 200 metres to win by three-quarter of a length. Novellist was strongly fancied for the Prix de l'Arc de Triomphe, but was ruled out on the day before the race when he was found to be running an abnormally high temperature.

== Stud career ==
Novellist was retired from racing in October 2013 and was sold to the Shadai Corporation, and stood at the Shadai Stallion Station in Hokkaido, Japan from 2014 to 2021, when he was moved to Lex Stud. As of January 2024, Novellist's most successful progenies are Last Draft, who won the Keisei Hai in 2019, and Breakup, who won the 2022 Copa Republica Argentina.

In December 2023, Novellist was retired from stud duty and was pensioned at the Yogibo Versailles Resort Farm.

== Assessment ==
In the 2012 edition of the World Thoroughbred Rankings, Novellist was given a rating of 118, making him the 89th best racehorse in the world and the fourth best three-year-old colt trained in Europe behind Camelot, Pastorius and Encke. In the 2013 edition of the rankings, Novellist was rated the best four-year-old in the world, the best male horse in Europe and the fifth-best horse of any age or sex, tying with Lord Kanaloa, and ranking behind Black Caviar, Treve, Wise Dan and Orfevre.

He was voted German Horse of the Year for 2013, taking 49% of the vote ahead of Lucky Speed (30%) and Neatico (21%).

== Pedigree ==
Pedigree of Novellist (IRE), dark bay or brown stallion 2009
Sire Monsun (GER) 1990	Konigsstuhl (GER); 1976	Dschingis Khan	Tamerlane
Sire Monsun (GER) 1990	Konigsstuhl (GER); 1976	Dschingis Khan	Donna Diana
Sire Monsun (GER) 1990	Konigsstuhl (GER); 1976	Konigskronung	Tiepoletto
Sire Monsun (GER) 1990	Konigsstuhl (GER); 1976	Konigskronung	Kronung
Sire Monsun (GER) 1990	Mosella (GER); 1985	Surumu	Literat
Sire Monsun (GER) 1990	Mosella (GER); 1985	Surumu	Surama
Sire Monsun (GER) 1990	Mosella (GER); 1985	Monasia	Authi
Sire Monsun (GER) 1990	Mosella (GER); 1985	Monasia	Monacensia
Dam Night Lagoon (GER) 2001	Lagunas (GER); 1981	Ile de Bourbon	Nijinsky
Dam Night Lagoon (GER) 2001	Lagunas (GER); 1981	Ile de Bourbon	Roseliere
Dam Night Lagoon (GER) 2001	Lagunas (GER); 1981	Liranga	Literat
Dam Night Lagoon (GER) 2001	Lagunas (GER); 1981	Liranga	Love In
Dam Night Lagoon (GER) 2001	Nenuphar (IRE); 1994	Night Shift	Northern Dancer
Dam Night Lagoon (GER) 2001	Nenuphar (IRE); 1994	Night Shift	Ciboulette
Dam Night Lagoon (GER) 2001	Nenuphar (IRE); 1994	Narola	Nebos
Dam Night Lagoon (GER) 2001	Nenuphar (IRE); 1994	Narola	Nubia (Family 4-r)
