= 2013 World's Best Racehorse Rankings =

The 2013 World's Best Racehorse Rankings, sponsored by Longines was the 2013 edition of the World's Best Racehorse Rankings. It was an assessment of Thoroughbred racehorses issued by the International Federation of Horseracing Authorities (IFHA) in January 2012. It included horses aged three or older which competed in flat races during 2013. It was open to all horses irrespective of where they raced or were trained.

== Rankings for 2013 ==
- For a detailed guide to this table, see below.

Rank	Rating	Horse	Age	Sex	Trained	Pos.	Race	Surface	Dist.	Cat.
1	130	Black Caviar (GB)	6	M	AUS	1st	Black Caviar Lightning	Turf	1,000	S
1	130	Treve (FRA)	3	F	FR	1st	Prix de l'Arc de Triomphe	Turf	2,400	L
3	129	Wise Dan (USA)	6	G	USA	1st	Woodbine Mile	Turf	1,600	M
3	129	Orfevre (JPN)	5	H	JPN	1st	Arima Kinen	Turf	2,500	L
5	128	Lord Kanaloa (JPN)	5	H	JPN	1st	Hong Kong Sprint	Turf	1,200	S
5	128	Novellist (GER)	4	C	GER	1st	King George VI & Queen Elizabeth Stakes	Turf	2,400	L
7	125	Animal Kingdom (USA)	5	H	USA	1st	Dubai World Cup	Artificial	2,000	I
7	125	Mucho Macho Man (USA)	5	H	USA	1st	Breeders' Cup Classic	Dirt	2,000	I
7	125	Olympic Glory (IRE)	3	C	GB	1st	Queen Elizabeth II Stakes	Turf	1,600	M
7	125	Toronado (IRE)	3	C	GB	1st	Sussex Stakes	Turf	1,600	M
11	124	Al Kazeem (GB)	5	H	GB	1st	Eclipse Stakes	Turf	2,008	I
11	124	Ambitious Dragon (NZ)	6	G	HK	1st	Queen's Silver Jubilee Cup	Turf	1,400	M
11	124	Dawn Approach (IRE)	3	C	IRE	1st	2000 Guineas	Turf	1,600	M
11	124	Declaration of War (USA)	4	C	IRE	1st 3rd	International Stakes; Breeders' Cup Classic	Turf; Dirt	2,080; 2,000	I
11	124	Farhh (GB)	5	H	GB	1st	Lockinge Stakes; Champion Stakes	Turf	1,600; 2,000	M I
11	124	Fort Larned (USA)	5	H	USA	1st	Stephen Foster Handicap	Turf	1,800	M
11	124	Game On Dude (USA)	6	G	USA	1st	Santa Anita Handicap; Hollywood Gold Cup	Dirt; Artificial	2,000	I
11	124	Gold Ship (JPN)	4	C	JPN	1st	Takarazuka Kinen	Turf	2,200	L
11	124	Intello (GER)	3	C	FR	3rd	Prix de l'Arc de Triomphe	Turf	2,400	L
11	124	Magician (IRE)	3	C	IRE	1st	Breeders' Cup Turf	Turf	2,400	L
11	124	Military Attack (IRE)	5	G	HK	1st	Singapore Airlines International Cup	Turf	2,000	I
11	124	St Nicholas Abbey (IRE)	6	H	IRE	1st	Dubai Sheema Classic	Turf	2,410	L
11	124	Will Take Charge (USA)	3	C	USA	2nd	Breeders' Cup Classic	Dirt	2,000	I
24	123	Cirrus des Aigles (FR)	7	G	FR	1st	Prix Dollar	Turf	1,950	I
24	123	Just A Way (JPN)	4	C	JPN	1st	Tenno Sho	Turf	2,000	I
24	123	Moonlight Cloud (GB)	5	M	FR	1st	Prix Jacques le Marois	Turf	1,600	M
24	123	Point of Entry (USA)	5	H	USA	1st	Gulfstream Park Handicap	Turf	1,800	M
24	123	The Fugue (GB)	4	F	GB	1st	Irish Champion Stakes	Turf	2,000	I
29	122	All Too Hard (AUS)	3	C	AUS	1st	Cathay Pacific Futurity	Turf	1,400	M
29	122	Atlantic Jewel (AUS)	5	M	AUS	1st	Memsie Stakes; Caulfield Stakes	Turf	1,400; 2,000	M I
29	122	Maxios (GB)	5	H	FR	1st	Prix du Moulin	Turf	1,600	M
29	122	Mukhadram (GB)	4	C	GB	2nd	Prince of Wales's Stakes	Turf	2,000	I
29	122	Ocean Park (NZ)	5	H	NZ	1st	New Zealand Stakes	Turf	2,000	I
29	122	Pierro (AUS)	3	C	AUS	1st	Canterbury Stakes	Turf	1,300	S
29	122	Reliable Man (GB)	5	H	AUS	1st	Queen Elizabeth Stakes	Turf	2,000	I
29	122	Ron the Greek (USA)	6	H	USA	1st	Jockey Club Gold Cup	Dirt	2,000	I
29	122	Ruler of the World (IRE)	3	C	IRE	3rd	Champion Stakes	Turf	2,000	I
38	121	Beholder (USA)	3	F	USA	1st	Breeders' Cup Distaff	Dirt	1,800	M
38	121	Fenomeno (JPN)	4	C	JPN	1st	Tenno Sho	Turf	3,200	E
38	121	Glorious Days (AUS)	6	G	HK	1st	Hong Kong Mile	Turf	1,600	M
38	121	Indy Point (ARG)	4	C	USA	3rd	Breeders' Cup Turf	Turf	2,400	L
38	121	Dundeel (NZ)	3	C	NZ	1st	Rosehill Guineas; Australian Derby	Turf	2,000; 2,400	I L
38	121	Kizuna (JPN)	3	C	JPN	4th	Prix de l'Arc de Triomphe	Turf	2,400	L
38	121	Lethal Force (IRE)	4	C	GB	1st	July Cup	Turf	1,200	S
38	121	Obviously (IRE)	5	G	USA	1st	Shoemaker Mile Stakes	Turf	1,600	M
38	121	Pastorius (GER)	4	C	GER	1st	Prix Ganay	Turf	2,100	I
47	120	Akeed Mofeed (GB)	4	C	HK	1st	Hong Kong Cup	Turf	2,000	I
47	120	Epaulette (AUS)	3	C	AUS	2nd 1st	The T J Smith; Doomben 10,000	Turf	1,200; 1,350	S M
47	120	Flintshire (GB)	3	C	FR	1st	Grand Prix de Paris	Turf	2,400	L
47	120	Lucky Nine (IRE)	6	G	HK	1st	KrisFlyer International Sprint	Turf	1,200	S
47	120	Orb (USA)	3	C	USA	1st	Kentucky Derby	Dirt	2,000	I
47	120	Princess of Sylmar (USA)	3	F	USA	1st	Kentucky Oaks	Dirt	1,800	M
47	120	Red Cadeaux (USA)	7	G	GB	1st	Dubai World Cup; Melbourne Cup	Artificial; Turf	2,000; 3,200	I E
47	120	Sahara Sky (USA)	5	H	USA	1st	Metropolitan Handicap	Dirt	1,600	M
47	120	Soft Falling Rain (SAF)	4	C	GB	1st	Joel Stakes	Turf	1,600	M
47	120	Trading Leather (IRE)	3	C	IRE	2nd	International Stakes	Turf	2,080	I
47	120	Variety Club (SAF)	5	H	SAF	1st	L'Ormarins Queen's Plate	Turf	1,600	M
47	120	What A Winter (SAF)	6	H	SAF	1st	Computaform Sprint	Turf	1,000	S
47	120	Za Approval (USA)	5	G	USA	2nd	Breeders' Cup Mile	Turf	1,600	M
60	119	African Story (GB)	6	G	UAE	1st	Burj Nahaar	Artificial	1,600	M
60	119	Big Blue Kitten (USA)	5	H	USA	1st	Sword Dancer Stakes	Turf	2,400	L
60	119	California Memory (USA)	7	G	HK	2nd 1st	Queen Elizabeth II Cup; Champions & Chater Cup	Turf	2,000; 2,400	I L
60	119	Cross Traffic (USA)	4	C	USA	1st	Whitney Stakes	Dirt	1,800	M
60	119	Dominant (IRE)	5	H	HK	1st	Hong Kong Vase	Turf	2,400	L
60	119	Eishin Flash (JPN)	6	H	JPN	3rd 1st	Queen Elizabeth II Cup; Mainichi Okan	Turf	2,000; 1,600	I M
60	119	Fiorente (IRE)	5	H	AUS	1st	Melbourne Cup	Turf	3,200	E
60	119	Flat Out (USA)	7	H	USA	1st	Cigar Mile Handicap	Dirt	1,600	M
60	119	Goldencents (USA)	3	C	USA	1st	Breeders' Cup Dirt Mile	Dirt	1,600	M
60	119	Gold-Fun (IRE)	4	G	HK	1st	Hong Kong Mile	Turf	1,600	M
60	119	Graydar (USA)	4	C	USA	1st	Donn Handicap	Dirt	1,800	M
60	119	Mental (AUS)	5	G	UAE	1st	Al Shindagha Sprint	Artificial	1,200	S
60	119	Packing Whiz (IRE)	5	G	HK	1st	Chairman's Trophy	Turf	1,600	M
60	119	Palace Malice (USA)	3	C	USA	1st	Belmont Stakes; Jim Dandy Stakes	Dirt	2,400; 1,800	L M
60	119	Royal Delta (USA)	5	M	USA	1st	Delaware Handicap; Personal Ensign Stakes	Dirt	2,000; 1,800	I M
60	119	Samaready (AUS)	4	M	AUS	1st	A J Moir Stakes	Turf	1,200	S
60	119	Sea Moon (GB)	5	H	AUS	1st	Herbert Power Stakes	Turf	2,400	L
60	119	Shea Shea (SAF)	6	G	UAE	1st	Al Quoz Sprint	Turf	1,000	S
60	119	Shonan Mighty (JPN)	5	H	JPN	2nd	Yasuda Kinen	Turf	1,600	M
60	119	Sky Lantern (IRE)	3	F	GB	1st	Coronation Stakes	Turf	1,600	M
60	119	Tosen Jordan (JPN)	7	H	JPN	3rd	Japan Cup	Turf	2,400	L
60	119	Tosen Ra (JPN)	5	H	JPN	2nd 1st	Tenno Sho; Mile Championship	Turf	3,200; 1,600	E M
60	119	Verrazano (USA)	3	C	USA	1st	Haskell Invitational	Dirt	1,800	M
83	118	Boban (AUS)	4	G	AUS	1st	Cantala Stakes	Turf	1,600	M
83	118	Buffering (AUS)	6	G	AUS	1st	VRC Sprint Classic	Turf	1,200	S
83	118	Dan Excel (IRE)	5	G	HK	1st	Champions Mile	Turf	1,600	M
83	118	Epiphaneia (JPN)	3	C	JPN	2nd 1st	Tokyo Yushun; Kikuka Sho	Turf	2,400; 3,000	L E
83	118	Gordon Lord Byron (IRE)	5	G	IRE	1st	Haydock Sprint Cup	Turf	1,200	S
83	118	Happy Trails (AUS)	6	G	AUS	1st	Turnbull Stakes	Turf	2,000	I
83	118	Heavy Metal (SAF)	4	G	SAF	1st	Durban July	Turf	2,200	L
83	118	Hillstar (GB)	3	C	GB	3rd	King George VI & Queen Elizabeth Stakes	Turf	2,400	L
83	118	Leading Light (IRE)	3	C	IRE	1st	St Leger	Turf	2,920	E
83	118	Little Mike (USA)	6	G	USA	1st	Turf Classic	Turf	2,400	L
83	118	Oxbow (USA)	3	C	USA	1st	Preakness Stakes	Dirt	1,900	I
83	118	Penglai Pavilion (USA)	3	C	FR	5th	Prix de l'Arc de Triomphe	Turf	2,400	L
83	118	Reynaldothewizard (USA)	7	G	UAE	1st	Mahab Al Shimaal	Artificial	1,200	S
83	118	Shamus Award (AUS)	3	C	AUS	1st	Cox Plate	Turf	2,040	I
83	118	Silentio (USA)	4	C	USA	3rd	Breeders' Cup Mile	Turf	1,600	M
83	118	Successful Dan (USA)	7	G	USA	2nd	Whitney Stakes	Dirt	1,800	M
83	118	Super Cool (AUS)	3	G	AUS	1st	Australian Cup	Turf	2,000	I
83	118	Time After Time (AUS)	5	G	HK	2nd 7th	Queen's Silver Jubilee Cup; Sha Tin Vase	Turf	1,400; 1,200	M S
83	118	Top Notch Tonto (IRE)	3	G	GB	2nd	Queen Elizabeth II Stakes	Turf	1,600	M
83	118	Vagabond Shoes (IRE)	6	G	USA	5th	Breeders' Cup Turf	Turf	2,400	L
83	118	Veyron (NZ)	8	G	NZ	1st	Warwick Stakes	Turf	1,400	M
83	118	Very Nice Name (FR)	4	C	QAT	3rd	Sheema Classic	Turf	2,410	L

== Guide ==
A complete guide to the main table above.

Rank
A horse's position in the list, with the most highly rated at number 1. Each horse is ranked once according to its highest rating. Any lesser ratings for the same horse are not ranked.

Rating
A rating represents a weight value in pounds, with higher values given to horses which showed greater ability. It is judged that these weights would equalise the abilities of the horses if carried in a theoretical handicap race. The minimum rating required for inclusion is 115.

Horse
Each horse's name is followed by a suffix (from the IFHA's International Code of Suffixes) which indicates the country foaled.

Age
The age of the horse at the time it achieved its rating. The racing ages of all horses foaled in a particular part of the world increase simultaneously, regardless of the actual date of foaling.
Dates of age increase by location foaled
Northern Hemisphere	1 January
South America	1 July
Australia, New Zealand and South Africa	1 August

Sex
C	Colt	Ungelded male horse up to four-years-old
F	Filly	Female horse up to four-years-old
H	Horse	Ungelded male horse over four-years-old
M	Mare	Female horse over four-years-old
G	Gelding	Gelded male horse of any age

Trained
The country where the horse was trained at the time of the rating, abbreviated using the International Code of Suffixes.

Position
The horse's finishing position in the race shown. The actual finishing order can sometimes be amended following an inquiry or a disqualification.
=	Dead-heat
↑	Promoted from original finishing position
↓	Relegated from original finishing position

Race
The race (or one of the races) for which the horse achieved its rating. A defeated horse can be rated above its higher-placed opponents if it carried more weight.

Surface
The surface of the track on which the race was run, eg. turf or dirt. Synthetic surfaces are described as "artificial".

Distance
The distance of the race in metres. In some countries (eg. Canada, Great Britain, Ireland and the United States), the length of a race is usually expressed in miles and furlongs. These units have been converted to metres to allow for universal comparison.
Common conversions
5 furlongs	= 1,006 m	1 mile and 1½ furlongs	= 1,911 m
6 furlongs	= 1,207 m	1 mile and 2 furlongs	= 2,012 m
6½ furlongs	= 1,308 m	1 mile and 2½ furlongs	= 2,112 m
7 furlongs	= 1,408 m	1 mile and 3 furlongs	= 2,213 m
7½ furlongs	= 1,509 m	1 mile and 4 furlongs	= 2,414 m
1 mile	= 1,609 m	1 mile and 6 furlongs	= 2,816 m
1 mile and ½ furlong	= 1,710 m	2 miles	= 3,219 m
1 mile and 1 furlong	= 1,811 m	2 miles and 4 furlongs	= 4,023 m

Category
		Metres	Furlongs
S	Sprint	1,000–1,300; 1,000–1,599 (CAN / USA)	5–6.5; 5–7.99 (CAN / USA)
M	Mile	1,301–1,899; 1,600–1,899 (CAN / USA)	6.51–9.49; 8–9.49 (CAN / USA)
I	Intermediate	1,900–2,100	9.5–10.5
L	Long	2,101–2,700	10.51–13.5
E	Extended	2,701+	13.51+

International Code of Suffixes
The following countries have been represented in the WTR as foaling or training locations since the first edition in 2004.
ARG	Argentina	ITY	Italy
AUS	Australia	JPN	Japan
BRZ	Brazil	KSA	Saudi Arabia
CAN	Canada	NZ	New Zealand
CHI	Chile	SAF	South Africa
CZE	Czech Republic	SIN	Singapore
FR	France	SPA	Spain
GB	Great Britain	TUR	Turkey
GER	Germany	UAE	United Arab Emirates
HK	Hong Kong	USA	United States
HUN	Hungary	VEN	Venezuela
IRE	Ireland	ZIM	Zimbabwe

Shading
The shaded areas represent lesser ratings recorded by horses which were more highly rated in a different category. The IFHA publishes this information when the lower rating is the overall top performance in a particular category.
