= Fiorente =

Irish-bred Thoroughbred racehorse (2008–2023)

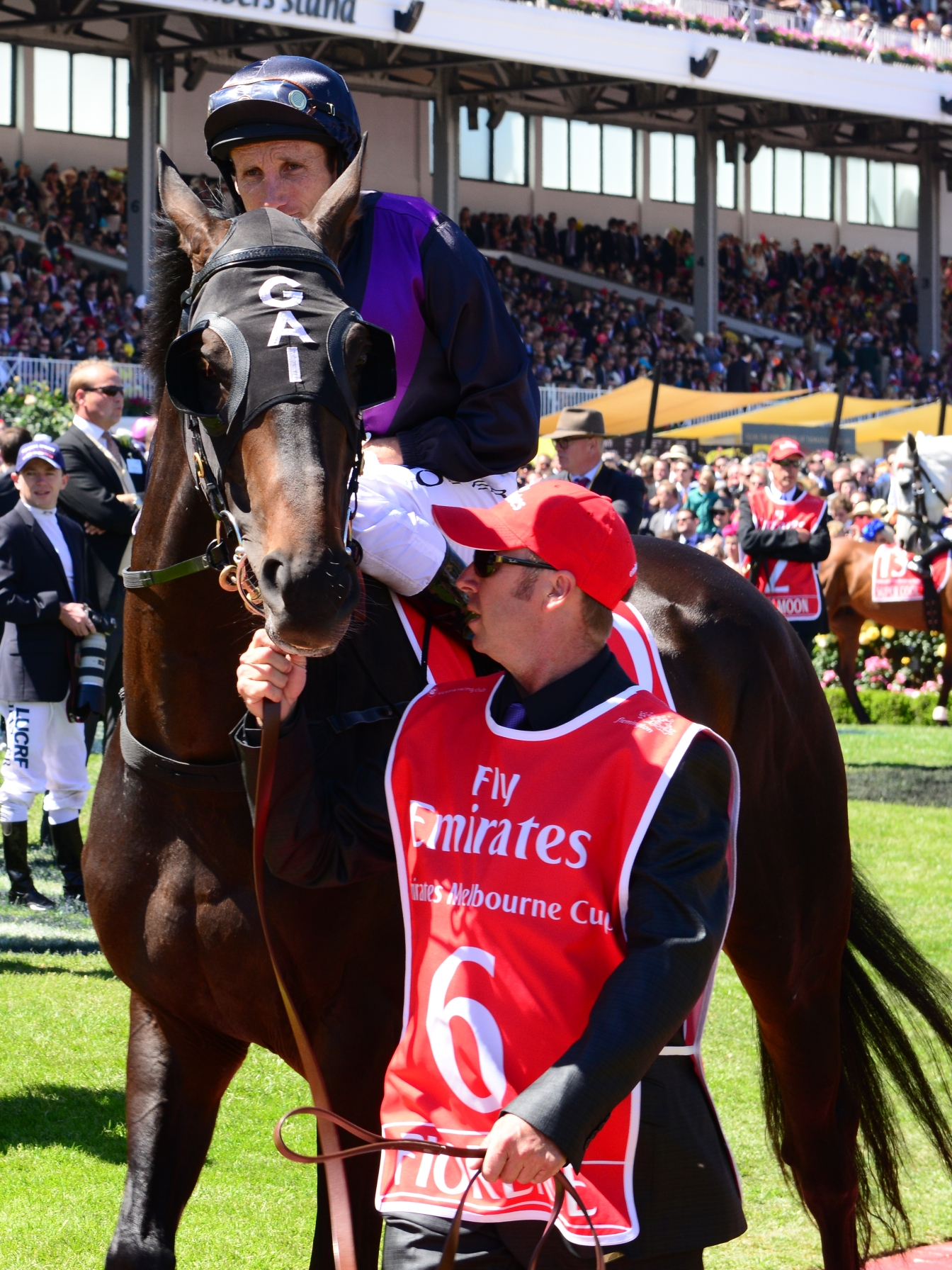
- Fiorente with jockey Damien Oliver prior to the running of the 2013 Melbourne Cup
- Sire: Monsun
- Grandsire: Königsstuhl
- Dam: Desert Bloom
- Damsire: Pilsudski
- Sex: Stallion
- Foaled: 26 February 2008
- Died: 30 May 2023 (aged 15)
- Country: Ireland
- Colour: Brown
- Breeder: Ballymacoll Stud
- Owner: Ballymacoll Stud; A T Roberts et al
- Trainer: Sir Michael Stoute; Gai Waterhouse
- Record: 20: 6-4-2
- Earnings: A$6,265,611

Major wins
- Princess of Wales's Stakes (2012); Dato Tan Chin Nam Stakes (2013); Melbourne Cup (2013); St George Stakes (2014); Australian Cup (2014)

Awards
- Australian Champion Stayer (2014)
- Last updated on 5 November 2013

Fiorente (26 February 2008 – 30 May 2023) was a Thoroughbred racehorse bred in Ireland and trained in Australia. When racing in Europe, he showed high-class form, winning the Princess of Wales's Stakes in 2012. He had greater success when campaigned in Australia, winning the Dato Tan Chin Nam Stakes and the Melbourne Cup in 2013. In 2014 he won the St George Stakes and the Australian Cup.

== Background ==
Fiorente was a brown horse bred in Ireland by the County Meath-based Ballymacoll Stud. He was sired by Monsun, who won the Europa Preis twice and became a successful breeding stallion, siring Shirocco, Manduro, Estimate and Stacelita.

== Racing career ==
=== European career ===
Fiorente was originally trained by Sir Michael Stoute at Newmarket, Suffolk. Unraced as a two-year-old, he ran four times as a three-year-old in 2011. He won a maiden race at Newbury Racecourse and finished second in both the Group Two King Edward VII Stakes (beaten five lengths by Nathaniel) and the Group Three Gordon Stakes.

In the following year he ran five times, recording his most important victory in the Princess of Wales's Stakes at Newmarket Racecourse in July.

=== Australian career ===
In the autumn of 2012 Fiorente was transferred to Australia to be trained by Gai Waterhouse.

In the 2012 Melbourne Cup he ran second to Green Moon. Returning to racing in the autumn he ran once over 1400 metres in the All Aged Stakes, finishing third to All Too Hard.

In the 2013 Spring carnival he won the Dato Tan Chin Nam Stakes and then ran third behind Shamus Award in the 2013 Cox Plate. He followed this by winning the 2013 Melbourne Cup, ridden by Damien Oliver.

On 8 March, Fiorente won the Australian Cup, beating Green Moon and Shamus Award at weight-for-age. Fiorente then finished unplaced behind the New Zealand mare Silent Achiever in the Ranvet Stakes and third behind the same horse in The BMW. On 7 April it was announced that Fiorente had sustained a serious tendon injury and would be retired from racing.

== Stud career ==
Fiorente stood at Sun Stud in Victoria for a service fee of A$17,600.

Fiorente died from chronic illness on 30 May 2023, at the age of 15.

== Pedigree ==
Pedigree of Fiorente (IRE), bay horse 2008
Sire Monsun (GER) 1990	Konigsstuhl (GER); 1976	Dschingis Khan	Tamerlane
Sire Monsun (GER) 1990	Konigsstuhl (GER); 1976	Dschingis Khan	Donna Diana
Sire Monsun (GER) 1990	Konigsstuhl (GER); 1976	Konigskronung	Tiepoletto
Sire Monsun (GER) 1990	Konigsstuhl (GER); 1976	Konigskronung	Kronung
Sire Monsun (GER) 1990	Mosella (GER); 1985	Surumu	Literat
Sire Monsun (GER) 1990	Mosella (GER); 1985	Surumu	Surama
Sire Monsun (GER) 1990	Mosella (GER); 1985	Monashia	Authi
Sire Monsun (GER) 1990	Mosella (GER); 1985	Monashia	Monacensia
Dam Desert Bloom (IRE) 2000	Pilsudski (IRE); 1992	Polish Precedent	Danzig*
Dam Desert Bloom (IRE) 2000	Pilsudski (IRE); 1992	Polish Precedent	Past Example
Dam Desert Bloom (IRE) 2000	Pilsudski (IRE); 1992	Cocotte	Troy
Dam Desert Bloom (IRE) 2000	Pilsudski (IRE); 1992	Cocotte	Gay Milly
Dam Desert Bloom (IRE) 2000	Desert Beauty (IRE); 1994	Green Desert	Danzig*
Dam Desert Bloom (IRE) 2000	Desert Beauty (IRE); 1994	Green Desert	Foreign Courier
Dam Desert Bloom (IRE) 2000	Desert Beauty (IRE); 1994	Hellenic	Darshaan
Dam Desert Bloom (IRE) 2000	Desert Beauty (IRE); 1994	Hellenic	Grecian Sea (Family 5-h)

* Firoente is inbred 4D x 4D to the stallion Danzig, meaning that he appears fourth generation twice on the dam side of his pedigree.
