= Brown Panther =

British-bred Thoroughbred racehorse

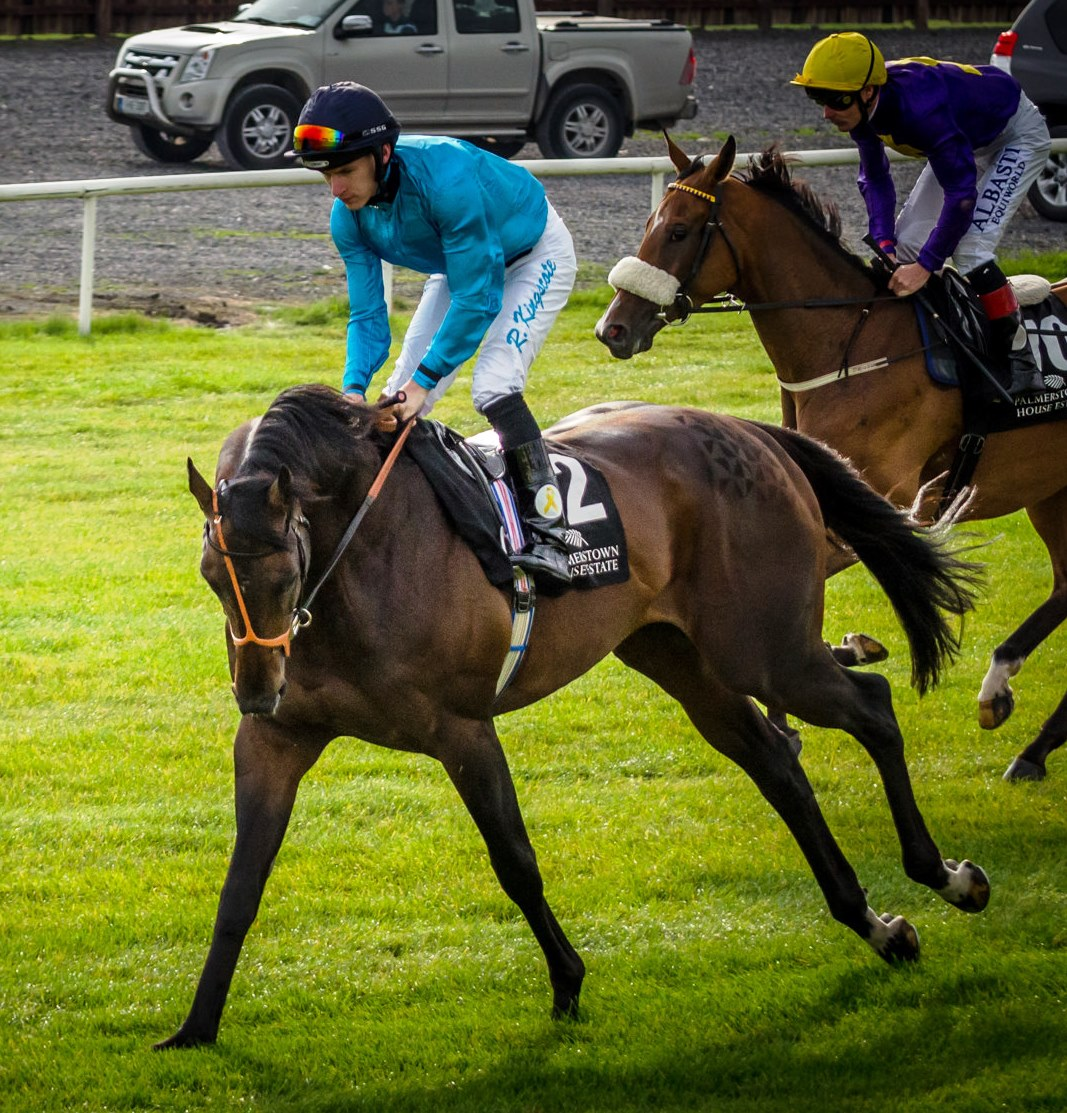
- Brown Panther at 2014 Irish St. Leger
- Sire: Shirocco
- Grandsire: Monsun
- Dam: Treble Heights
- Damsire: Unfuwain
- Sex: Colt
- Foaled: 3 March 2008
- Country: United Kingdom
- Colour: Bay
- Breeder: Owen Promotions Ltd
- Owner: Andrew Black & Owen Promotions Ltd
- Trainer: Tom Dascombe
- Record: 28: 11-5-3
- Earnings: £1,114,425

Major wins
- King George V Stakes (2011); Pontefract Castle Stakes (2012, 2013); Goodwood Cup (2013); Ormonde Stakes (2014); Henry II Stakes (2014); Irish St. Leger (2014); Dubai Gold Cup (2015)

Brown Panther (3 March 2008 – 13 September 2015) was a British Thoroughbred racehorse. During a racing career which lasted from November 2010 until September 2014 he won eleven of his twenty-eight races and competed in seven countries, namely Britain, Germany, Ireland, France, Australia, the US and the UAE: he would have raced in an eighth, Canada, but bolted before the start of the Canadian International Stakes. He attracted media attention both because of his racing achievements and because he was bred and owned by the England footballer Michael Owen.

After winning his only race as a two-year-old he won two minor races in the spring of 2011 before recording his first notable success in the King George V Stakes at Royal Ascot and went on to finish second in the St Leger. In 2012 he won the Pontefract Castle Stakes and finished a close third in the Irish St. Leger. As a five-year-old he won a second Pontefract Castle Stakes and recorded his biggest win up to that time when winning the Goodwood Cup. In the following season he had his most successful campaign, winning the Ormonde Stakes, Henry II Stakes and Irish St. Leger. He recorded his final victory in the Dubai Gold Cup in March 2015. He was fatally injured in the Irish St. Leger on 13 September 2015.

== Background ==
Brown Panther was a bay horse with a small white star bred by Owen Promotions Ltd, a company owned by Michael Owen. Owen has said that his interest in horse racing came from his father, who placed a small combination bet every Saturday and allowed the 11-year-old Owen to choose one of the three horses involved.

He was sired by Shirocco who won four Group One races including the Breeders' Cup Turf and was voted German Horse of the Year. Apart from Brown Panther, Shirocco's most successful offspring has been the hurdler Annie Power. Brown Panther's dam Treble Heights was a successful racemare for Owen, winning the Listed Aphrodite Stakes and finished second in the Group Two Prix de Pomone in 2003. She was descended from Marie d'Ecosse, whose half-sister Glen Line was the dam of Our Babu and the Eclipse Stakes winner King of the Tudors.

Throughout his racing career, Brown Panther was owned by Michael Owen in partnership with Andrew Black (the co-founder of Betfair) and was trained at Malpas, Cheshire by Tom Dascombe.

== Racing career ==
=== 2010: two-year-old season ===
Brown Panther made his racecourse debut in a maiden race over seven furlongs on the synthetic fibresand surface at Southwell Racecourse on 11 November 2010. Ridden as in most of his races by Richard Kingscote, he started at odds of 9/2 and took the lead in the last 50 yards to win by a length from Flying Power and eight others.

=== 2011: three-year-old season ===
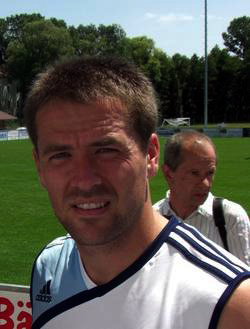
Michael Owen, who bred and owned Brown Panther

In the early part of 2011, Brown Panther competed in handicap races, beginning with a fourth place at Kempton Park Racecourse in April. He was then moved up in distance to 1 1/2 miles and won minor races at Chester and Haydock Park in May. In June he was sent to Royal Ascot and was made 4/1 joint favourite in an eighteen-runner field for the King George V Stakes. Carrying 125 pounds he raced behind the leaders before Kingscote sent him into the lead approaching the final turn. In the straight Brown Panther drew away from his opponents and won by six lengths despite being eased down by Kingscote in the final strides. After the race a visibly emotional Owen said "The problem with racing is you've got no control whatsoever. I don't get nervous playing football because I can do something about it. Racing, you're just in the lap of the Gods... I was screaming, steady on Richard, I was worried that we'd got there too soon".

Brown Panther was moved up in class to contest Group races in the second half of the year. In July he was sent to Germany and started favourite for the Deutsches Derby at Hamburg but after leading for most of the way he was overtaken in the last 400 metres and finished fifth behind Waldpark. In the following month he ran in the weight-for-age Geoffrey Freer Stakes at Newbury Racecourse and finished second to Census, a colt he had beaten easily at Ascot. Kieren Fallon took over from Kingcote when the colt was one of nine three-year-olds to contest the classic St Leger over 14 1/2 furlongs at Doncaster Racecourse on 10 September. Commenting on the decision to replace Kingcote, Dascombe said "it was a tough decision, but on this occasion we've decided to go for a more experienced jockey... you don't get too many chances to win a Classic". After racing towards the rear of the field Brown Panther made steady progress in the straight and finished second to Masked Marvel with Sea Moon, Blue Bunting and Census among the other beaten horses.

=== 2012: four-year-old season ===
Brown Panther made no impact on his four-year-old debut as he finished a distant last of four behind Memphis Tennessee in the Ormonde Stakes at Chester in May. He was then dropped in class for the Listed Pontefract Castle Stakes at Pontefract Racecourse and recorded his only victory of the season as he won easily by seven lengths from three opponents. After the colt finished seventh in the King George VI and Queen Elizabeth Stakes in July, Kingscote regained the ride from Fallon, and partnered the horse in all of his subsequent races. He finished second in the Geoffrey Freer Stakes again (beaten by Mount Athos) and then travelled to Ireland for the Irish St. Leger at the Curragh Racecourse in September. He produced what was probably his best effort of the season as he finished third in a "blanket finish", beaten a head and a short head by Royal Diamond and Massiyn. Brown Panther ended his third season by finishing unplaced in the Prix Royal Oak on heavy ground at Longchamp Racecourse in October.

=== 2013: five-year-old season ===
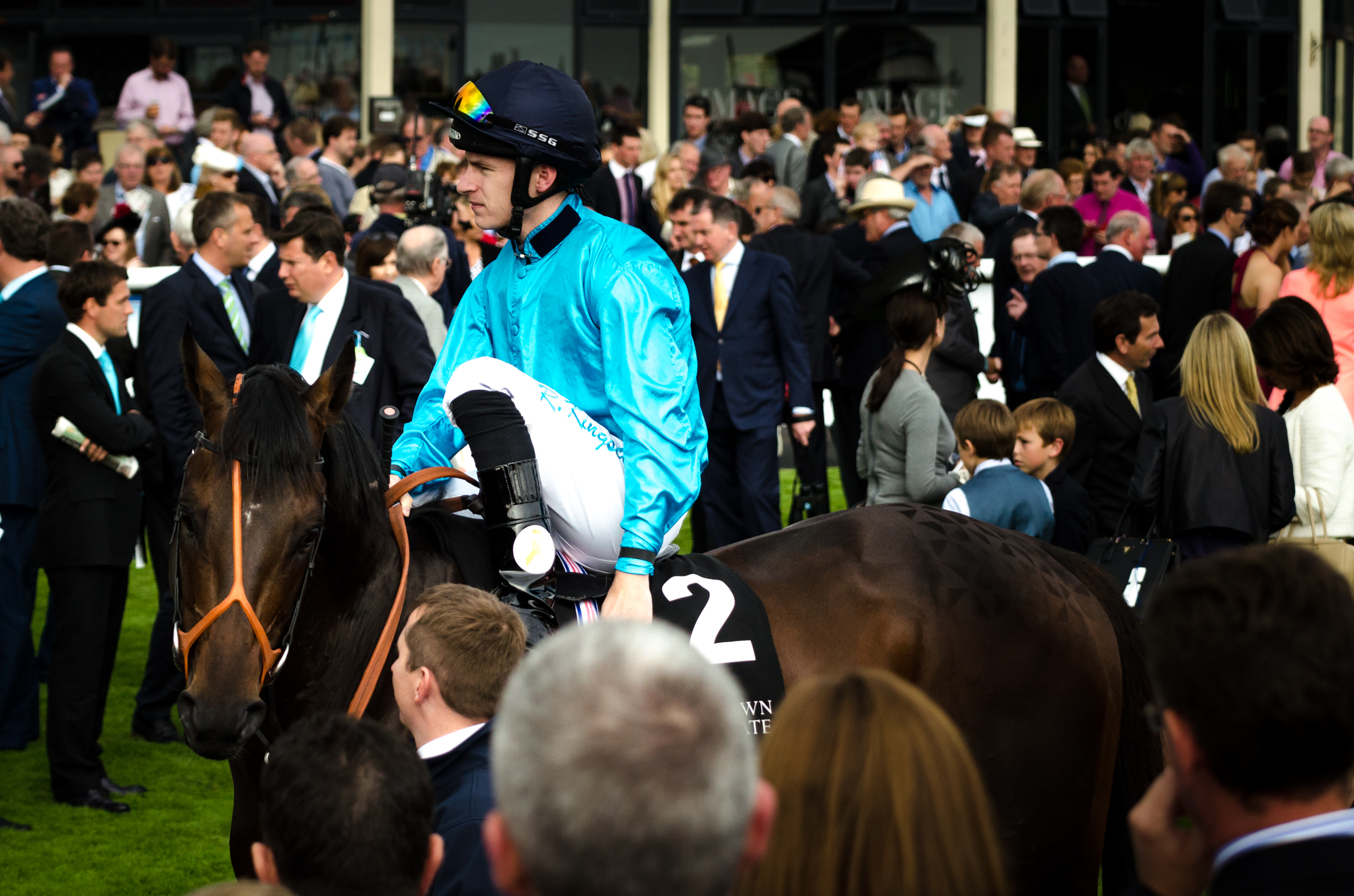
Brown Panther in September 2014.

Brown Panther did not begin his fourth season until the 23 June when he won the Pontefract Castle stakes for the second year in succession, beating Souviens Toi by 3 1/2 lengths with Main Sequence in fourth place. On his next appearance he was moved up in class and distance for the Goodwood Cup over two miles on 1 August and was made 13/2 third favourite behind Mount Athos and the John Gosden-trained Caucus. The other runners included Colour Vision (winner of the 2012 Ascot Gold Cup), Altano (later to win the Prix du Cadran), Saddler's Rock (winner of the race in 2012) and Cavalryman (Grand Prix de Paris, Dubai Gold Cup). Brown Panther tracked the leaders before forcing his way through the pack to take the lead two furlongs out. He quickly accelerated clear of his rivals and won by three and a half length from Ahzeemah with Altano taking third. Owen commented "There is a lot of heritage in this race and it's a fabulous race to win. He's full of stamina" before suggesting the Melbourne Cup as a future target. Dascombe said "We probably haven't done as well as we should have done with him by now. I think the horse is helping us because he's maturing. We've taken our time and tried to pick races this year. We've tried to get him spot-on for each day and it seems to be working a bit better than it was. This was the plan, this was the target. Hopefully we'll move on if he's all right after this".

Brown Panther was brought back in class and distance for the Listed Foundation Stakes over ten furlongs at Goodwood in September, and led for most of the way before being outpaced in the closing stages and finishing fifth behind the favourite Grandeur. On his final appearance of the year he was sent to Australia for the Melbourne Cup in which he carried 121 pounds and started at odds of 19/1 in a field of 24 runners. He raced prominently until the straight but faded in the closing stages and finished eighth behind Fiorente. He sustained a "nasty gash" to his leg in the race and missed projected runs in the Japan Cup and the Hong Kong Vase.

=== 2014: six-year-old season ===
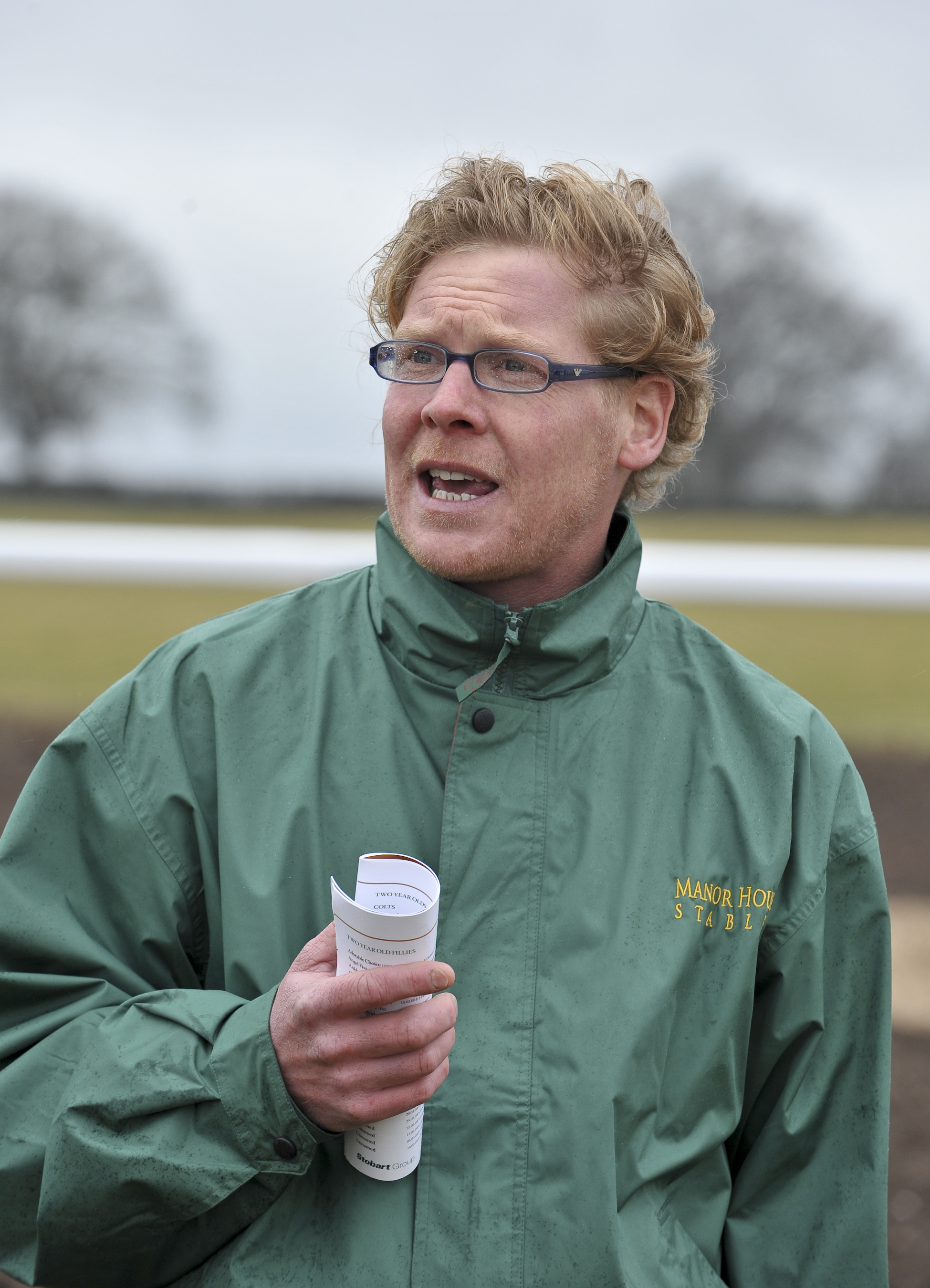
Tom Dascombe, who trained Brown Panther

Brown Panther's first appearance as a six-year-old came in the Ormonde Stakes on 9 May in which he faced three opponents headed by Hillstar, the winner of the 2013 King Edward VII Stakes. He started slowly but took the lead three furlongs out and stayed on well to win by two and a quarter lengths from Hillstar. Kingscote commented "We went a nice even gallop and he's growing up, it makes my life a lot easier". Three weeks later the horse started 2/1 favourite for the Henry II Stakes over two miles at Sandown Park Racecourse, with his opponents including Tiger Cliff (Ebor Handicap), Girolamo (Preis von Europa), Seismos (Grosser Preis von Baden), Menorah (Supreme Novices' Hurdle) and Camborne (Arc Trial). Brown Panther raced in second place before taking the lead approaching the final furlong and drew way to win "decisively" by 3 1/2 lengths from High Jinx. He then started second favourite for the Ascot Gold Cup on 19 June and finished fourth behind Leading Light but was promoted to third after the disqualification of the runner-up Estimate. In July he finished second when favourite for the Prix Maurice de Nieuil at Longchamp and then finished third to Cavalryman and Ahzeemah when attempting to repeat his 2013 success in the Goodwood Cup.

On 14 September, Brown Panther made his second attempt to win the Irish St. Leger and started a 14/1 outsider in an eleven-runner field. Leading Light was made the odds-on favourite whilst the other contenders included Royal Diamond, Encke, Pale Mimosa (Lonsdale Cup) Willing Foe (Aston Park Stakes) and Pallasator. Racing on good to firm ground Brown Panther settled in second place behind Leading Light's pacemaker Eye of the Storm as the pair drew many lengths clear of the field. He took the lead two furlongs out and quickly went clear, winning easily by 6 1/2 lengths from Leading Light, with Encke a head away in third. There was some criticism of the other jockeys in the race, who were seen as having allowed Brown Panther to get too far ahead before the race began in earnest. Dascombe said" It's just worked out today. We have been having a real lean time. We didn't manage to have a winner last week and I was close to pulling him out, but there aren't too many Irish St. Legers so you have to run. The horse never lets us down".

In late autumn Brown Panther was sent to North America for what was intended to be a two race campaign, starting with the Canadian International Stakes at Woodbine Racetrack on 14 October. He was withdrawn from the race however, after becoming agitated in the preliminaries, throwing off Kingscote and then bolting when the jockey remounted. In his absence, the race was won by Hillstar. Kingscote commented "the horse got wound up and unfortunately he got me off. When I got back on, I tried to keep him relaxed and as soon as I let go he bolted. There wasn't much I could do after that. He's never done that before. He sometimes dances about and gets on his toes, but he's never been that extreme". On his last appearance of 2014 he was brought back in distance for the Breeders' Cup Turf at Santa Anita Park on 1 November but was outpaced in the closing stages and finished eleventh of the twelve runners behind Main Sequence.

=== 2015: seven-year-old season ===
On his debut as a seven-year-old, Brown Panther was sent to the United Arab Emirates for the Dubai Gold Cup over two miles at Meydan Racecourse on 28 March. Kingscote took the ride despite not having fully recovered from a very serious injury sustained in a fall in November which left him with a fractured left elbow, forearm and wrist and right collar-bone. He started the 4/1 favourite with his fourteen rivals including horses from Britain, the UAE, South Africa, Qatar and France. After racing in second place he took the lead three furlongs from the finish and won "comfortably" by three and a quarter lengths from the South African gelding Star Empire. The winning time of 3:18.84 was a record for the race. After the race, Kingscote commented on his injury, saying "It sometimes aches, especially after he took a grip with me on Thursday morning, but it's never painful and I'll go back and have the plates out at the end of the season. It helps to have a goal of a horse like this".

On his return to Europe he started favourite for the Yorkshire Cup in May but was beaten half a length by Snow Sky, to whom he was conceding five pounds. The winner went on to win the Hardwicke Stakes by almost four lengths. He was expected to run in the Ascot Gold Cup in June but was withdrawn after sustaining an injury to his left foreleg.

==== Final race and death ====
After an absence of almost four months, Brown Panther returned on 13 September to run for the third time in the Irish St. Leger at the Curragh. He started the 13/2 joint fourth-choice in the betting behind Order of St George (Irish St. Leger Trial Stakes), Forgotten Rules (British Champions Long Distance Cup) and Agent Murphy (Geoffrey Freer Stakes). Brown Panther disputed the early lead before settling in second place but began to struggle at half-way and was pulled up by Kingscote six furlongs from the finish. A veterinary examination revealed a double fracture of the right hind leg and the horse was immediately euthanised.

Owen described the day as the saddest of his life and commented on his blog "The toughest, most honest, most brilliant horse I will ever set eyes on passed away today doing the thing he loved most. I was with him when he was born, shared an experience for seven years that will never be repeated and gave him his last kiss goodbye. What an honour to own and breed him. I love you Panther. Life will not be the same without you". Writing on Facebook Dascombe described the public response to the horse's death as "overwhelming", adding "it is touching to know that complete strangers and many people within our industry share in our despair. It is apparent that many people saw Brown Panther as their horse not just ours... He died at the scene of his greatest triumph, doing what he loved best. No matter how heart-breaking this is for us, Brown Panther was happy and cared for by everyone right up until the moment he was put down".

== Pedigree ==
Pedigree of Brown Panther (GB), bay stallion, 2008
Sire Shirocco (GER) 2001	Monsun (GER); 1990	Königsstuhl	Dschingis Khan
Sire Shirocco (GER) 2001	Monsun (GER); 1990	Königsstuhl	Koningskronung
Sire Shirocco (GER) 2001	Monsun (GER); 1990	Mosella	Surumu
Sire Shirocco (GER) 2001	Monsun (GER); 1990	Mosella	Monasia
Sire Shirocco (GER) 2001	So Sedulous (USA); 1991	The Minstrel	Northern Dancer*
Sire Shirocco (GER) 2001	So Sedulous (USA); 1991	The Minstrel	Fleur
Sire Shirocco (GER) 2001	So Sedulous (USA); 1991	Sedulous	Tap On Wood
Sire Shirocco (GER) 2001	So Sedulous (USA); 1991	Sedulous	Pendulina
Dam Treble Heights (IRE) 1999	Unfuwain (USA); 1985	Northern Dancer*	Nearctic*
Dam Treble Heights (IRE) 1999	Unfuwain (USA); 1985	Northern Dancer*	Natalma*
Dam Treble Heights (IRE) 1999	Unfuwain (USA); 1985	Height of Fashion	Bustino
Dam Treble Heights (IRE) 1999	Unfuwain (USA); 1985	Height of Fashion	Highclere
Dam Treble Heights (IRE) 1999	Height of Passion (GB); 1982	Shirley Heights	Mill Reef
Dam Treble Heights (IRE) 1999	Height of Passion (GB); 1982	Shirley Heights	Hardiemma
Dam Treble Heights (IRE) 1999	Height of Passion (GB); 1982	Maladie d'Amour	Fidalgo
Dam Treble Heights (IRE) 1999	Height of Passion (GB); 1982	Maladie d'Amour	Marie d'Ecosse (Family: 19-b)

* Brown Panther is inbred 4S x 3D to the stallion Northern Dancer, meaning that he appears fourth generation on the sire side of his pedigree, and third generation on the dam side of his pedigree.
