= Preis der Deutschen Einheit =

- Class: Group 3
- Location: Hoppegarten Racecourse; Hoppegarten, Germany
- Inaugurated: 1991
- Race type: Flat / Thoroughbred
- Sponsor: Westminster
- Website: Hoppegarten

Race information
- Distance: 2,000 metres (1¼ miles)
- Surface: Turf
- Track: Right-handed
- Qualification: Three-years-old and up
- Weight: 57 kg (3yo); 59 kg (4yo+); Allowances; 1½ kg for fillies and mares
- Purse: €80,000 (2012); 1st: €45,000

The Preis der Deutschen Einheit is a Group 3 flat horse race in Germany open to thoroughbreds aged three years or older. It is run each year at Hoppegarten over a distance of 2,000 metres (about 1¼ miles).

The race is held on German Unity Day (Tag der Deutschen Einheit), a public holiday on October 3 commemorating the anniversary of German reunification.

== History ==
The event was established in 1991, and it was initially classed at Listed level. It was originally sponsored by Zino Davidoff and alternatively titled the Prix Zino Davidoff. It was promoted to Group 3 status in 1992.

The Preis der Deutschen Einheit has had several different sponsors since the late 1990s, including Volkswagen from 2003 to 2005. Its current period of sponsorship by Westminster Unternehmensgruppe began in 2009.

== Records ==
Most successful horse (2 wins):

- Terre de l'Home – 2002, 2003
- Russian Tango – 2010, 2011

Leading jockey (6 wins):

- Eduardo Pedroza – Terre de l'Home (2003), Russian Tango (2010, 2011), Wake Forest (2014), Potemkin (2015), Va Bank (2018)

Leading trainer (7 wins):

- Andreas Wöhler – Terre de l'Home (2002, 2003), Russian Tango (2010, 2011), Wake Forest (20214), Potemkin (2015), Va Bank (2018)

== Winners ==
Year	Winner	Age	Jockey	Trainer	Time
1991	George Augustus	3	Johnny Murtagh	John Oxx	2:04.90
1992	Perpendicular	4	Willie Ryan	Henry Cecil	2:00.90
1993	Komtur	3	Kevin Woodburn	Harro Remmert	2:03.60
1994	Marildo	7	Guy Guignard	David Smaga	2:05.50
1995	Concepcion	5	Stephen Eccles	Heinz Jentzsch	2:06.10
1996	Oxalagu	4	Andrasch Starke	Bruno Schütz	2:07.50
1997	March Groom	3	Stephen Davies	Otto Gervai	2:08.70
1998	Elle Danzig	3	Andrasch Starke	Andreas Schütz	2:11.20
1999	Terek	3	Andreas Suborics	Peter Schiergen	2:06.70
2000	Aboard	5	Piotr Piatkowski	Wolfgang Figge	2:05.60
2001	Limerick Boy	3	Andreas Suborics	Andreas Schütz	2:14.60
2002	Terre de l'Home	5	Gary Hind	Andreas Wöhler	2:05.90
2003	Terre de l'Home	6	Eduardo Pedroza	Andreas Wöhler	2:07.90
2004	Omikron	3	Martin Dwyer	Mario Hofer	2:05.00
2005	Manduro	3	Terence Hellier	Peter Schiergen	2:08.80
2006	Karavel	3	Kieren Fallon	Peter Schiergen	2:08.00
2007	Waleria	4	Viktor Schulepov	Hans-Jürgen Gröschel	2:07.60
2008	Prince Flori	5	Torsten Mundry	Sascha Smrczek	2:09.20
2009	Antara	3	Alexander Pietsch	Roland Dzubasz	2:06.90
2010	Russian Tango	3	Eduardo Pedroza	Andreas Wöhler	2:03.70
2011	Russian Tango	4	Eduardo Pedroza	Andreas Wöhler	2:05.50
2012	Pastorius	3	Adrie de Vries	Mario Hofer	2:02.10
2013	Neatico	6	Andrasch Starke	Peter Schiergen	2:02.00
2014	Wake Forest	4	Eduardo Pedroza	Andreas Wöhler	2:02.40
2015	Potemkin	4	Eduardo Pedroza	Andreas Wöhler	2:06.30
2016	Devastar	4	Martin Seidl	Markus Klug	2:07.00
2017	Matchwinner	6	Andreas Helfenbein	Axel Kleinkorres	2:09.72
2018	Va Bank	6	Eduardo Pedroza	Andreas Wöhler	2:08.20
2019	Itobo	7	Marco Casamento	Hans-Jurgen Groschel	2:10.93
2020	Tabera	3	Lukas Delozier	Miltcho G. Mintchev	2:08.05
2021	Grocer Jack	4	Alexander Pietsch	Waldemar Hickst	2:03.00
2022	Petit Marin	3	Rene Piechulek	Marcel Weiss	2:05.71
2023	Lord Charming	5	Rene Piechulek	Peter Schiergen	2:06.61
2024	Quest The Moon	8	Rene Piechulek	Frau S. Steinberg	2:07.37
2025	Santagada	3	Adrie de Vries	Peter Schiergen	2:05.13

== See also ==
- List of German flat horse races
