= Dashing Blade =

British-bred Thoroughbred racehorse

- Sire: Elegant Air
- Grandsire: Shirley Heights
- Dam: Sharp Castan
- Damsire: Sharpen Up
- Sex: Stallion
- Foaled: 1 March 1987
- Country: United Kingdom
- Colour: Bay
- Breeder: Littleton Stud
- Owner: Jeff Smith
- Trainer: Ian Balding
- Record: 11: 6–1–1
- Earnings: £416,568

Major wins
- National Stakes (1989); Dewhurst Stakes (1989); Prix Eugène Adam (1990); Gran Premio d'Italia (1990)

Awards
- Leading sire in Germany (1998)

Dashing Blade (1 March 1987 – 15 August 2013) was a British Thoroughbred racehorse and sire who won major races in Ireland, England, France and Italy. As a two-year-old in 1989 he was one of the best colts of his generation in Europe winning four of his five races including the biggest races for juveniles in Ireland (the National Stakes) and England (the Dewhurst Stakes). In the following year he showed moderate form in England in spring but went on to win the Prix Eugène Adam in France and the Gran Premio d'Italia in Milan.

== Background ==
Dashing Blade was a bay horse with a narrow white blaze and three white socks bred by his owner, Jeff Smith's Littleton Stud. He was from the first crop of foals sired by Elegant Air whose wins included the Horris Hill Stakes, Westbury Stakes and Tattersalls Gold Cup. He made a promising start to his stud career but dies in 1990 at the age of nine. Dashing Blade's dam Sharp Castan won one of her seven races and finished third in the 1979 Fillies' Mile.

Dashing Blade was trained throughout his racing career by Ian Balding at Kingsclere in Hampshire and was ridden in all but two of his races by John Matthias. Like many of Balding's trainees, she usually raced in a white sheepskin noseband. Dashing Blade was not an easy horse to train: before he appeared in a race he broke loose on the gallops, jumped a gate and ran free for several miles before being recovered.

== Racing career ==
=== 1989: two-year-old season ===
Dashing Blade made his racecourse debut in the six furlong Berkshire Maiden Stakes on 14 June at Newbury Racecourse. Starting the 6/5 favourite he took the lead a furlong out and won by three lengths from Osario. Two weeks later, in a minor race at Salisbury Racecourse the colt started at odds of 1/6 and won "comfortably" by four lengths from Star Hill. Dashing Blade was then moved up in class and distance for the Group Three Vintage Stakes over seven furlongs at Goodwood Racecourse in which he was matched against the undefeated favourite Be My Chief. Starting at odds of 5/2 he tracked the favourite but was unable to quicken in the straight and finished third of the five runners. Despite his defeat at Goodwood the colt was moved up in class again as he was sent to Ireland to contest the Group One National Stakes over seven furlongs at the Curragh on 9 September. Book The Band (runner-up in the Gimcrack Stakes) started favourite with Dashing Blade next in the betting on 3/1. The other eight runners included Go And Go, Missionary Ridge (later to win the Gallinule Stakes) and the filly Wedding Bouquet (third in the Phoenix Stakes). After tracking the outsider Smokey Native, Dashing Blade went to the front approaching the final furlong and came out best in a closely contested finish, beating Wedding Bouquet by three quarters of a length with Book The Band and Pictorial just behind in third and fourth.

Dashing Blade returned to England to contest Britain's most prestigious race for two-year-olds, the Dewhurst Stakes over seven furlongs at Newmarket Racecourse on 20 October. The Vincent O'Brien-trained Royal Academy ahead of the Mill Reef Stakes winner Welney and the Michael Stoute-trained Cordoba (third in the Middle Park Stakes). Dashing Blade was next in the betting on 8/1 whilst the other three runners were Cullinan and Anshan (second and third in the Cartier Million sales race) and the 66/1 outsider Call To Arms. Dashing Blade was amongst the leaders from the start and went to the front in the last quarter mile. He was driven out by Matthias in the final furlong and won by a neck and a short head from Call To Arms and Anshan. Ian Balding commented "I always thought Dashing Blade would be better as a three-year-old. He was very spooky and nervous earlier this season but has settled down well".

=== 1990: three-year-old season ===
Dashing Blade's training was disrupted by injury in the early part of 1990. On his three-year-old debut he started a 25/1 outsider for the 2000 Guineas over the Rowley mile at Newmarket on 5 May and finished twelfth of the fourteen runners behind Tirol. On his next appearance at Royal Ascot on 19 June, the colt started the 10/1 fourth choice in the betting and finished fourth of the eight runners behind Shavian. Four weeks later the colt was sent to France and moved up in distance for the Prix Eugène Adam over 2000 metres at Saint-Cloud Racecourse in which his opponents included Starstreak and Elytis who had finished second and third in the Prix La Force. After racing in second place, Dashing Blade took the lead 800 metres from the finish and won by three lengths from the André Fabre-trained Verre Bleu.

Two weeks after his win in France, Dashing Blade was sent to Germany Bayerisches Zuchtrennen in Munich. He stayed on strongly in the closing stages but was beaten a length by the locally trained four-year-old Turfkonig. Ray Cochrane took over from Matthias when the colt returned to England for the International Stakes at York Racecourse on 21 August. After pulling hard in the early stages he took the lead in the straight but faded quickly in the last quarter mile to finish last of the nine runners behind In The Groove. On 22 September Dashing Blade was sent to Italy for the Group One Gran Premio d'Italia over 2400 metres in Milan in which he was ridden by Brian Rouse. He started second favourite behind Houmayoun who had won the Italian Derby in May. The race took a bizarre twist at half way when Houmayoun's pacemaker Trojancar took the wrong course and had to be pulled up. Dashing Blade took the lead in the straight and drew away from his rivals to win "comfortably" by six lengths from Bold Passion. Jeff Smith was reportedly keen to run the colt in the Prix de l'Arc de Triomphe but Dashing Blade's racing career was ended by a tendon injury and he was retired at the end of the season.

== Stud record ==
At the end of his racing career, Dashing Blade was retired to become a breeding stallion and spent most of his stud career in Germany. The best of his offspring included Proudwings (Falmouth Stakes), Lord of England (Bayerishes Zuchtrennen), Faberger (Premio Vittorio di Capua), Soave (Bénazet-Rennen), Sirius (Grosser Preis von Berlin) and Moon Over Miami (November Novices' Chase). He was also the broodmare sire of Stacelita. Dashing Blade was pensioned from stud duty in 2013 at the age of 26 due to the effects of old age and arthritis. He was euthanised on 15 August 2013 at the Gestut Etzean after developing neurological problems.

== Pedigree ==
Pedigree of Dashing Blade (GB), bay stallion, 1987
Sire Elegant Air (GB) 1981	Shirley Heights (GB); 1975	Mill Reef	Never Bend
Sire Elegant Air (GB) 1981	Shirley Heights (GB); 1975	Mill Reef	Milan Mill
Sire Elegant Air (GB) 1981	Shirley Heights (GB); 1975	Hardiemma	Hardicanute
Sire Elegant Air (GB) 1981	Shirley Heights (GB); 1975	Hardiemma	Grand Cross
Sire Elegant Air (GB) 1981	Elegant Tern (USA); 1971	Sea-Bird	Dan Cupid
Sire Elegant Air (GB) 1981	Elegant Tern (USA); 1971	Sea-Bird	Sicalade
Sire Elegant Air (GB) 1981	Elegant Tern (USA); 1971	Pride's Profile	Free America
Sire Elegant Air (GB) 1981	Elegant Tern (USA); 1971	Pride's Profile	Hillbrook
Dam Sharp Castan (GB) 1977	Sharpen Up (GB); 1969	Atan	Native Dancer
Dam Sharp Castan (GB) 1977	Sharpen Up (GB); 1969	Atan	Mixed Marriage
Dam Sharp Castan (GB) 1977	Sharpen Up (GB); 1969	Rocchetta	Rockefella
Dam Sharp Castan (GB) 1977	Sharpen Up (GB); 1969	Rocchetta	Chambiges
Dam Sharp Castan (GB) 1977	Sultry One (GB); 1961	Tropique	Fontenay
Dam Sharp Castan (GB) 1977	Sultry One (GB); 1961	Tropique	Aurore Boreale
Dam Sharp Castan (GB) 1977	Sultry One (GB); 1961	Sweet Heart	Honeyway
Dam Sharp Castan (GB) 1977	Sultry One (GB); 1961	Sweet Heart	Women's Legion (Family: 2-o)
