= Frühjahrs Dreijährigen-Preis =

Frühjahrs Dreijährigen-Preis Frühjahrs-Preis des Bankhauses Metzler (Stadtrat Albert von Metzler-Rennen)
- Class: Group 3
- Location: Baden-Baden Racecourse; Baden-Baden, Germany
- Inaugurated: 1965
- Race type: Flat / Thoroughbred
- Sponsor: Bankhaus Metzler
- Website: Baden-Baden

Race information
- Distance: 2,000 metres (1¼ miles)
- Surface: Turf
- Track: Left-handed
- Qualification: Three-year-olds
- Weight: 58 kg Allowances; 1½ kg for fillies
- Purse: €55,000 (2012); 1st: €32,000

The Frühjahrs Dreijährigen-Preis is a Group 3 flat horse race in Germany open to three-year-old thoroughbreds. It is run over a distance of 2,000 metres (about 1¼ miles) at Baden-Baden in late May or early June.

== History ==
The event was established in 1965, and it was originally called the Adolf Schindling-Rennen. It was named in memory of Adolf Schindling (1887–1963), a Frankfurt-born businessman who owned the successful stud farm Gestüt Asta.

The race was given Group 3 status in 1982. For a period it was sponsored by Steigenberger Hotels and run as the Preis der Steigenberger Hotels. It was later backed by BMW and titled the BMW Händler-Trophy.

The banking company Bankhaus Metzler took over the sponsorship in 2000. Since 2016 it was moved to Baden-Baden to be run at its spring festival and renamed the Ittlingen Derby Trial.

== Records ==
Leading jockey (7 wins):

- Eduardo Pedroza – Shrek (2007), Scalo (2010), Earl of Tinsdal (2011), Novellist (2012), Wai Key Star (2016), Langtang (2017), Royal Youmzain (2018)

Leading trainer (11 wins):

- Heinz Jentzsch – Bussard (1967), Sayonara (1968), Don Giovanni (1969), Samun (1970), Muffel (1971), Lua Vindu (1978), Ataxerxes (1980), Abary (1983), Lontano (1985), Monsun (1993), Savinelli (1994)

== Winners ==
Year	Winner	Jockey	Trainer	Time
1965	Geck	Peter Alafi	János Pejacsevich	2:06.20
1966	Asil	Harald Ziese	Andreas Hecker	2:03.20
1967	Bussard	Werner Krbalek	Heinz Jentzsch	2:07.20
1968	Sayonara	Werner Krbalek	Heinz Jentzsch	2:14.80
1969	Don Giovanni	Fritz Drechsler	Heinz Jentzsch	2:14.80
1970	Samun	Fritz Drechsler	Heinz Jentzsch	2:12.50
1971	Muffel	Horst Horwart	Heinz Jentzsch	2:10.20
1972	Wendel	Harald Ziese	Theo Grieper	2:10.30
1973	Belmondo	Manfred Kosman	Hans-Georg Thalau	2:10.80
1974	Meinberg	Erwin Schindler	Karl-Heinz Schultze	2:10.30
1975	Frescobaldi	Uwe Mathony	J. Hochstein, Sr.	2:10.00
1976	Furiant	Greville Starkey	Theo Grieper	2:10.40
1977	Leviathan	David Wildman	Adolf Wöhler	2:14.80
1978	Lua Vindu	Peter Kienzler	Heinz Jentzsch	2:13.40
1979	Königsstuhl	Franz Puchta	Sven von Mitzlaff	2:08.80
1980	Ataxerxes	Peter Schade	Heinz Jentzsch	2:06.40
1981	no race
1982	Ditano	Greville Starkey	Theo Grieper	2:09.40
1983	Abary	Andrzej Tylicki	Heinz Jentzsch	2:10.60
1984	Der Wind	Pat Gilson	Theo Grieper	2:06.50
1985	Lontano	Andrzej Tylicki	Heinz Jentzsch	2:06.60
1986	Vif-Argent	Ralf Suerland	Peter Lautner	2:11.50
1987	Le Glorieux	Alain Lequeux	Robert Collet	2:06.90
1988	Exactly Sharp	Dominique Regnard	Robert Collet	2:02.60
1989	Riamo	Georg Bocskai	Hartmut Steguweit	2:10.50
1990	Diable au Corps	Dominique Regnard	John Hammond	2:08.40
1991	Tao	Ole Larsen	Andreas Wöhler	2:07.83
1992	Iron Fighter	Andrew Riding	Horst Steinmetz	2:07.65
1993	Monsun	Peter Schiergen	Heinz Jentzsch	2:06.44
1994	Savinelli	Peter Schiergen	Heinz Jentzsch	2:07.72
1995	Speedster	Alessandro Schikora	Bruno Schütz	2:08.25
1996	Ardilan	Torsten Mundry	Horst Horwart	2:08.57
1997	Ungaro	Terence Hellier	Hans Blume	2:12.70
1998	Nadour Al Bahr ^{[a]}	Andreas Suborics	Mario Hofer	2:07.48
1999	Imperioso	Andreas Suborics	Peter Schiergen	2:07.63
2000	Kallisto	Andreas Boschert	Hans Blume	2:07.72
2001	Blue Baloo	Billy Newnes	Andreas Schütz	2:15.74
2002	Maranilla	John Egan	Eoghan O'Neill	2:09.64
2003	Flambo	Filip Minarik	Peter Schiergen	2:12.00
2004	Apeiron	Jean-Pierre Carvalho	Mario Hofer	2:08.74
2005	Königstiger	Filip Minarik	Peter Schiergen	2:12.80
2006	Prince Flori	Henk Grewe	Sascha Smrczek	2:07.81
2007	Shrek	Eduardo Pedroza	Andreas Wöhler	2:07.03
2008	Kamsin	Andrasch Starke	Peter Schiergen	2:10.18
2009	Glad Panther	William Mongil	Uwe Ostmann	2:08.38
2010	Scalo	Eduardo Pedroza	Andreas Wöhler	2:07.85
2011	Earl of Tinsdal	Eduardo Pedroza	Andreas Wöhler	2:08.41
2012	Novellist	Eduardo Pedroza	Andreas Wöhler	2:11.27
2013	Vif Monsieur	Koen Clijmans	Jens Hirschberger	2:14.40
2014	Sea The Moon	Andreas Helfenbein	Marcus Klug	2:16.64
2015	Shadow Sadness	Rene Piechulek	Christian von der Recke	2:16.40
2016 ^{[b]}	Wai Key Star	Eduardo Pedroza	Andreas Wöhler	2:04.23
2017	Langtang	Eduardo Pedroza	Andreas Wöhler	2:02.38
2018	Royal Youmzain	Eduardo Pedroza	Andreas Wöhler	2:06.79
2019	Accon	Jiri Palik	Markus Klug	2:04.64
2020	Soul Trai	Bauyrzhan Murzabayev	Andreas Wöhler	2:04.88
2021	Sea Of Sands	Lukas Delozier	Jean-Pierre Carvalho	2:04.99
2022	Queroyal	Eduardo Pedroza	Andreas Wöhler	2:05.57
2023	Fantastic Moon	Rene Piechulek	Frau S Steinberg	2:05.97
2024	Augustus	Michal Abik	Waldemar Hickst	2:16.90
2025	Juwelier	Adrie de Vries	Alessandro & Giuseppe Botti	2:03.09
2026	Seguro	Benjamin Marie	Andreas Suborics	2:05.30

^{a} Aboard finished first in 1998, but he was relegated to second place following a stewards' inquiry.

^{b} Since 2016 it is disputed in late May or early June at Baden-Baden and named the Ittlingen Derby-Trial.

== See also ==
- List of German flat horse races
- Recurring sporting events established in 1965 – this race is included under its original title, Adolf Schindling-Rennen.
