= Gran Premio del Jockey Club =

- Class: Group 2
- Location: San Siro Racecourse; Milan, Italy
- Inaugurated: 1921
- Race type: Flat / Thoroughbred
- Website: San Siro

Race information
- Distance: 2,400 metres (1½ miles)
- Surface: Turf
- Track: Right-handed
- Qualification: Three-years-old and up
- Weight: 56½ kg (3yo); 59 kg (4yo+); Allowances; 1½ kg for fillies and mares
- Purse: €506,000 (2026); 1st: £200,000

The Gran Premio del Jockey Club is a Group 2 flat horse race in Italy open to thoroughbreds aged three years or older. It is run at Milan over a distance of 2,400 metres (about 1½ miles), and it is scheduled to take place each year in October.

The event is named after the Jockey Club Italiano, a racing organisation based in Milan. It was established in 1921, and was initially contested over 1,800 metres.

The race was run over 2,000 metres in 1926 and 1927. It was extended to its current distance of 2,400 metres in 1928. Prior to 2017 it was contested at Group 1 level.

== Records ==
Most successful horse (2 wins):

- Erba – 1928, 1929
- Norman – 1953, 1954
- Schiaparelli – 2007, 2009

Leading jockey since 1970 (6 wins):

- Frankie Dettori – Misil (1993), Shantou (1996), Kutub (2001), Cherry Mix (2005), Schiaparelli (2009), Campanologist (2011)

Leading trainer since 1970 (4 wins):

- John Dunlop – Awaasif (1983), Silvernesian (1992), Silver Patriarch (1998), Golden Snake (2000)
- Saeed bin Suroor – Kutub (2001), Cherry Mix (2005), Schiaparelli (2009), Campanologist (2011)

Leading owner since 1970 (4 wins):

- Godolphin – Kutub (2001), Cherry Mix (2005), Schiaparelli (2009), Campanologist (2011)

== Winners since 1981 ==
Year	Winner	Age	Jockey	Trainer	Owner	Time
1981	Königsstuhl	5	Peter Alafi	Sven von Mitzlaff	Gestüt Zoppenbroich	2:37.30
1982	Friendswood	3	Michel Jerome	Luigi Turner	Nelson Bunker Hunt	2:36.90
1983	Awaasif	4	Lester Piggott	John Dunlop	Sheikh Mohammed	2:29.20
1984	Gold and Ivory	3	Steve Cauthen	Ian Balding	Paul Mellon	2:33.40
1985	St Hilarion	3	Greville Starkey	Guy Harwood	Athos Christodoulou	2:27.80
1986	Antheus	4	Gary W. Moore	Criquette Head	Jacques Wertheimer	2:27.80
1987	Tony Bin	4	Cash Asmussen	Luigi Camici	Allevamento White Star	2:39.80
1988	Roakarad	3	Jacques Heloury	Enrico Camici	Scuderia Gabriella	2:45.60
1989	Assatis	4	Geoff Baxter	Guy Harwood	Susumu Harada	2:28.00
1990	Erdelistan	3	Santiago Soto	Luciano d'Auria	Lady M Stable	2:39.20
1991	Passing Sale	4	Alain Lequeux	Bernard Sécly	André Boutboul	2:33.90
1992	Silvernesian	3	Lester Piggott	John Dunlop	Gerecon Italia	2:39.90
1993	Misil	5	Frankie Dettori	Vittorio Caruso	Scuderia Laghi	2:46.30
1994	Lando	4	Michael Roberts	Heinz Jentzsch	Gestüt Ittlingen	2:28.10
1995	Court of Honour	3	Willie Ryan	Peter Chapple-Hyam	Robert Sangster	2:28.70
1996	Shantou	3	Frankie Dettori	John Gosden	Sheikh Mohammed	2:32.40
1997	Caitano	3	Andrasch Starke	Bruno Schütz	Stall Blauer Reiter	2:26.20
1998	Silver Patriarch	4	Pat Eddery	John Dunlop	Peter Winfield	2:33.20
1999	Sumati	3	Mirco Demuro	Bruno Grizzetti	Scuderia Cocktail	2:31.60
2000	Golden Snake	4	Pat Eddery	John Dunlop	The National Stud	2:34.90
2001	Kutub	4	Frankie Dettori	Saeed bin Suroor	Godolphin	2:37.50
2002	Black Sam Bellamy	3	Michael Kinane	Aidan O'Brien	Michael Tabor	2:33.30
2003	Ekraar	6	Richard Hills	Marcus Tregoning	Hamdan Al Maktoum	2:28.40
2004	Shirocco	3	Andreas Suborics	Andreas Schütz	Georg von Ullmann	2:31.60
2005	Cherry Mix	4	Frankie Dettori	Saeed bin Suroor	Godolphin	2:32.20
2006	Laverock	4	Davy Bonilla	Carlos Laffon-Parias	Sheikh Mohammed	2:29.80
2007	Schiaparelli	4	Andrasch Starke	Peter Schiergen	Stall Blankenese	2:28.50
2008	no race (Note: The 2008 running was cancelled because of a strike)
2009	Schiaparelli	6	Frankie Dettori	Saeed bin Suroor	Godolphin	2:28.20
2010	Rainbow Peak	4	Neil Callan	Michael Jarvis	Peter Savill	2:36.10
2011	Campanologist	6	Frankie Dettori	Saeed bin Suroor	Godolphin	2:27.40
2012	Novellist	3	Eduardo Pedroza	Andreas Wöhler	Dr Christoph Bergler	2:29.50
2013	Earl of Tinsdal	5	Eduardo Pedroza	Andreas Wöhler	Sunrace Stables	2:31.10
2014	Dylan Mouth	3	Fabio Branca	Stefano Botti	Scuderia Effevi	2:34.50
2015	Lovelyn	3	Andrasch Starke	Peter Schiergen	Gestut Ittlingen	2:38.80
2016	Ventura Storm	3	Cristian Demuro	Richard Hannon Jr.	Middleham Park Racing LXXII	2:29.20
2017	Full Drago	4	Dario Vargiu	Stefano Botti	Dioscuri SRL	2:31.20
2018	Raymond Tusk	3	Jamie Spencer	Richard Hannon Jr.	Middleham Park Racing XXXI & K Sohi	2:28.90
2019	Donjah	3	Clement Lecoeuvre	Henk Grewe	Darius Racing	2:35.80
2020	Walderbe	4	Mlle Mickaelle Michel	Ralf Rohne	Stall Dusseldorf Fighters	2:36.10
2021	Road To Arc (Note: The 2021 races took place at Capannelle.)	4	Antonio Orani	Jerome Reynier	Fratini Alv E Corse Srl Unipersonale	2:31.00
2022	Sisfahan	4	Jack Mitchell	Henk Grewe	Darius Racing & Michael Motschmann	2:35.10
2023	Que Tempesta	4	Salvatore Sulas	Roberto Biondi	Andrea Sauro Fiordelli	2:25.80
2024	Straight	4	Lukas Delozier	Marian Falk Weissmeier	Gestut Karlshof	2:34.90
2025	Eydon	6	P. J. McDonald	Andrew Balding	Prince A A Faisal	2:28.00
2026	Stingray	5	Dario Di Tocco	Marcel Weiss	Taxi4horses.com	2:29.40

== Earlier winners ==
- 1921: Priapo
- 1922: Scopas
- 1923: Giovanna Dupre
- 1924: Stella d'Italia
- 1925: Major
- 1926: Giambologna
- 1927: Cercingoli
- 1928: Erba
- 1929: Erba
- 1930: Fantasio
- 1931: Ilario
- 1932: Niccolo Pisano
- 1933: Ello
- 1934: Ostia
- 1935: Pilade
- 1936: Chilone
- 1937: Milazzo
- 1938: Ursone
- 1939: Lafcadio
- 1940: Bellini
- 1941: Zuccarello
- 1942:
- 1943: Trau
- 1944: Erno
- 1945: Alleata
- 1946: Fante
- 1947: Tenerani
- 1948: Astolfina
- 1949: Antonio Canale / Grifone ^{1}
- 1950: Balestrina
- 1951: Daumier
- 1952: Caran d'Ache
- 1953: Norman
- 1954: Norman
- 1955: Ribot
- 1956: Tissot
- 1957: Ismone
- 1958: Nagami
- 1959: Sedan
- 1960: Rio Marin
- 1961: Molvedo
- 1962: Misti
- 1963: Soltikoff
- 1964: Veronese
- 1965: Atilla
- 1966: Marco Visconti
- 1967: Ruysdael
- 1968: Chicago
- 1969: Glaneuse
- 1970: Bacuco
- 1971: Weimar
- 1972: Tierceron
- 1973: Sang Bleu
- 1974: Authi
- 1975: Laomedonte
- 1976: Infra Green
- 1977: Stateff ^{2}
- 1978: Stone
- 1979: Scorpio
- 1980: Pawiment

^{1} The 1949 race was a dead-heat and has joint winners.
^{2} Balmerino finished first in 1977, but he was relegated to second place following a stewards' inquiry.

== See also ==
- List of Italian flat horse races
