= Pontefract Castle Stakes =

Flat horse race in Britain

Pontefract Castle Stakes
2026
Coedana	Revoir	Lemsairbat

Previous years
2025
Allonsy	Karmology	Meribella
2024
River Of Stars	Ching Shih	Divina Grace
2023
Voodoo Queen	One Evening	Ching Shih
2022
Glenartney	Goldie Hawk	The Flying Ginger
2021
Katara	Golden Pass	Urban Artist

2020-2011
2020
Antonia De Vega	La Lune	Makawee
2019
Bayshore Freeway	Dance Legend	Tamreer
2018
Isabel De Urbina	Alwaysandforever	Wingingit
2017
Abingdon	Lucy The Painter	Shearling
2016
Loving Things	Yarrow	Barsanti
2015
Connecticut	Nancy From Nairobi	Only Orsenfoolsies
2014
Freedom's Light	Waila	Familliarity
2013
Brown Panther	Souviens Toi	Between Us
2012
Brown Panther	Lost In The Moment	Jet Away
2011
Distant Memories	Ted Spread	Vulcanite

2010-2005
2010
Prospect Wells	Nanton	Mojave Moon
2009
Furmigadelagiusta	Drumfire	Unleashed
2008
Tranquil Tiger	Dunaskin	Alfie Flits
2007
Ivy Creek	The Geezer	Peppertree Lane
2006
Alfie Flits	Camrose	Lost Soldier Three
2005
Songlark	Shastye	Astrocharm

The Pontefract Castle Stakes is a Listed flat horse race in Great Britain open to fillies and mares aged four years or older. It is run at Pontefract over a distance of 1 mile 4 furlongs and 5 yards (2,419 metres), and it is scheduled to take place each year in June.

The race was first run in 2005. It was originally open to horses of either sex but was restricted to fillies and mares from the 2017 running.

== Records ==
Most successful horse (2 wins):

- Brown Panther – 2012, 2013

Leading jockey (2 wins):

- Harry Bentley – Isabel De Urbina (2018), Antonia De Vega (2020)
- Ryan Moore - Abingdon (2017), Katara (2021)
- William Buick - Freedom's Light (2014), River Of Stars (2024)

Leading trainer (4 wins):

- Ralph Beckett – Isabel De Urbina (2018), Antonia De Vega (2020), River Of Stars (2024), Allonsy (2025)

== Winners ==
Year	Winner	Age	Jockey	Trainer	Time
2005	Songlark	5	Kerrin McEvoy	Saeed bin Suroor	2:35.36
2006	Alfie Flits	4	Dean McKeown	Alan Swinbank	2:45.15
2007	Ivy Creek	4	Steve Drowne	Geoff Wragg	2:41.92
2008	Tranquil Tiger	4	Tom Queally	Henry Cecil	2:37:12
2009	Furmigadelagiusta	5	Philip Makin	Karl Burke	2:35.75
2010	Prospect Wells	5	Paul Mulrennan	J Howard Johnson	2:38.42
2011	Distant Memories	5	Jamie Spencer	Tom Tate	2:38.66
2012	Brown Panther	4	Kieren Fallon	Tom Dascombe	2:49.00
2013	Brown Panther	5	Richard Kingscote	Tom Dascombe	2:39.71
2014	Freedom's Light	4	William Buick	John Gosden	2:34.10
2015	Connecticut	4	Adam Kirby	Luca Cumani	2:39.78
2016	Loving Things	4	Martin Lane	Luca Cumani	2:37.05
2017	Abingdon	4	Ryan Moore	Sir Michael Stoute	2:37.54
2018	Isabel De Urbina	4	Harry Bentley	Ralph Beckett	2:38.54
2019	Bayshore Freeway	4	Franny Norton	Mark Johnston	2:36.43
2020	Antonia De Vega	4	Harry Bentley	Ralph Beckett	2:34.54
2021	Katara	4	Ryan Moore	Sir Michael Stoute	2:36.11
2022	Glenartney	4	Ross Coakley	Ed Walker	2:36.95
2023	Voodoo Queen	4	David Egan	Roger Varian	2:36.71
2024	River Of Stars	5	William Buick	Ralph Beckett	2:37.07
2025	Allonsy	4	Hector Crouch	Ralph Beckett	2:33.68
2026	Coedana	4	Connor Beasley	Edward Bethell	2:33.97

== See also ==
- Horse racing in Great Britain
- List of British flat horse races
