= Stacelita =

French-bred Thoroughbred racehorse

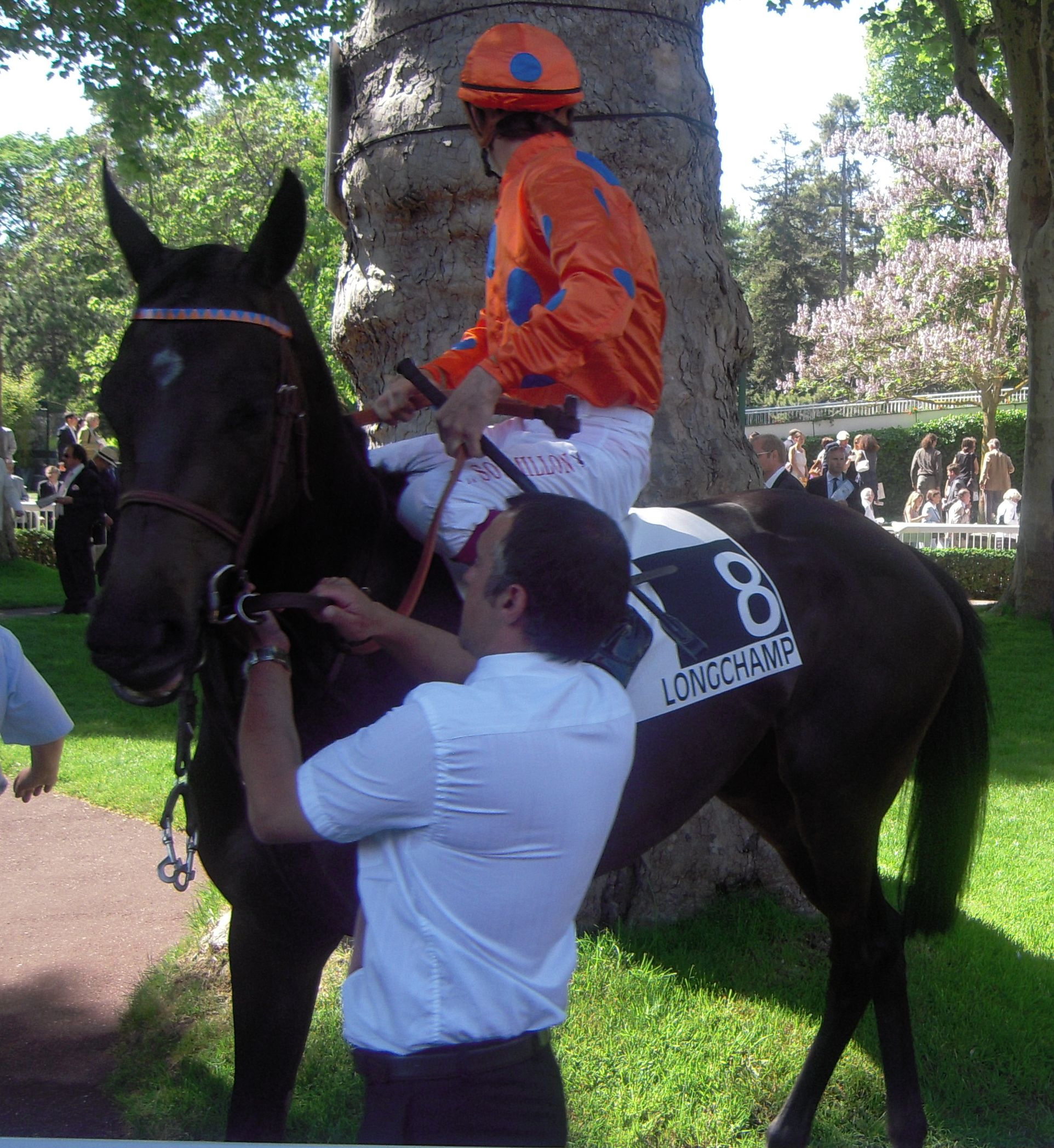
- Stacelita in the paddock at the 2010 Prix d'Ispahan
- Sire: Monsun
- Grandsire: Königsstuhl
- Dam: Soignee
- Damsire: Dashing Blade
- Sex: Mare
- Foaled: April 17, 2006
- Country: France
- Color: Dark bay or black
- Breeder: Jean-Pierre Joseph Dubois
- Owner: Martin S. Schwartz
- Trainer: Jean-Claude Rouget (2008–2010); Chad Brown (2011)
- Record: 18: 10-2-2
- Earnings: A$2,371,241

Major wins
- Prix Saint-Alary (2009); Prix de Diane (2009); Prix Vermeille (2009); La Coupe (2010); Prix Jean Romanet (2010); Beverly D. Stakes (2011); Flower Bowl Invitational Handicap (2011)

Awards
- American Champion Female Turf Horse (2011)

Stacelita (foaled 17 April 2006) is a Thoroughbred racehorse who was a Classic winner while based in France and became an Eclipse Award winner when relocated to the United States.

== Background ==
Stacelita is a dark bay or black mare who was bred in France by Jean-Pierre Joseph Dubois. By leading German sire Monsun, she was out of the stakes-winning mare Soignée by Dashing Blade. Martin Schwartz bought a share in the mare from her breeder in May 2009 and then assumed full ownership in 2010. She was originally trained by Jean-Claude Rouget, and later by Chad Brown.

== Racing career ==
Stacelita began her career with six straight wins including the Group I Prix Saint-Alary, Prix de Diane and Prix Vermeille, the latter as a result of the disqualification of Dar Re Mi. She finished her three-year-old campaign with a seventh-place finish in the Prix de l'Arc de Triomphe behind Sea the Stars after setting the early pace.

She began 2010 by finishing fourth in the Prix d'Ispahan behind Goldikova. She then won La Coupe at Longchamps before finishing second to Midday in the Nassau Stakes at Goodwood in her first trip outside of France. On 22 August, she won the Group I Prix Jean Romanet by a head over Antara but then finished second in the Prix de l'Opéra to stablemate Lily of the Valley. She finished the year by finishing eighth in the Hong Kong Cup behind Snow Fairy.

Stacelita began her five-year-old campaign in France by finishing third in La Coupe on 13 June 2011. She was then shipped to America for the Grade I United Nations Stakes on 2 July, but finished third behind Teaks North. Moved to the barn of trainer Chad Brown, she won the Beverly D. Stakes on 13 August by 1 1/4 lengths over Dubawi Heights. "I had an absolutely wonderful trip", said jockey Ramon Domínguez. "I was able to sit right off the leader. Nice and relaxed, comfortable fractions. Turning for home, once I found a seam on the rail, I had to go for it and she reached for it great." Stacelita returned to win the Flower Bowl Invitational on 1 October before finishing a disappointing tenth in the Breeders' Cup Filly & Mare Turf in the final race of her career. Despite that loss, Stacelita was named the 2011 Eclipse Award winner as champion female turf horse, winning 158 of 211 votes.

== Retirement ==
Stacelita was retired to broodmare duty and was bred in 2012 to Smart Strike. The resulting filly, foaled in 2013, was named Southern Stars and became a winner in Great Britain. Stacelita was then sold to Shadai Farm and bred to Frankel. The resultant filly, produced in 2014, was named Soul Stirring and became Frankel's first Grade/Group One winner when she won the Hanshin Juvenile Fillies in December 2016. Soul Stirring went on to win the Yushun Himba (Japanese Oaks) in 2017.

== Pedigree ==
Stacelita was sired by Monsun, who won the Europa Preis twice as a racehorse and became the leading sire in Germany four times. Monsun was at the forefront of a "renaissance" for German breeding, helped by the fact that his pedigree represented an outcross for the "ever-increasing saturation of Northern Dancer" in European bloodlines. Known for their stamina and soundness, German-breds made their first major impact in Europe through Urban Sea who was out of the German-bred mare Allegreta. Urban Sea won the Prix de l'Arc de Triomphe and became the dam of leading sire Galileo and his half-brother Sea the Stars. At the time of his death in 2012, Monsun was the sire of 108 stakes winners around the world, including Breeders' Cup Turf winner Shirocco.

Stacelita's dam Soignee was sired by Dashing Blade, a descendant of Mill Reef. Soignee's dam Suivez descended from Northern Dancer on her sire's side and from the influential German mare Schwartzgold on the dam's side. This family has produced multiple stakes winners around the world including American champion turf male Steinlen, Irish Derby winner Zagreb and French champion Sagace.

Pedigree of Stacelita
Sire Monsun (GER)	Königsstuhl (GER)	Dschingis Khan (GER)	Tamerlane (GB)
Sire Monsun (GER)	Königsstuhl (GER)	Dschingis Khan (GER)	Donna Diana (GER)
Sire Monsun (GER)	Königsstuhl (GER)	Konigskronung (GER)	Tiepoletto (FR)
Sire Monsun (GER)	Königsstuhl (GER)	Konigskronung (GER)	Kronung (GER)
Sire Monsun (GER)	Mosella (GER)	Surumu (GER)	Literat (GER)
Sire Monsun (GER)	Mosella (GER)	Surumu (GER)	Surama (GER)
Sire Monsun (GER)	Mosella (GER)	Monasia (GER)	Authi (IRE)
Sire Monsun (GER)	Mosella (GER)	Monasia (GER)	Monacensia (GER)
Dam Soignee (GER)	Dashing Blade (GB)	Elegant Air (GB)	Shirley Heights (GB)
Dam Soignee (GER)	Dashing Blade (GB)	Elegant Air (GB)	Elegant Tern (USA)
Dam Soignee (GER)	Dashing Blade (GB)	Sharp Castan (GB)	Sharpen Up (GB)
Dam Soignee (GER)	Dashing Blade (GB)	Sharp Castan (GB)	Sultry One (USA)
Dam Soignee (GER)	Suivez (FR)	Fioravanti (USA)	Northern Dancer (CAN)
Dam Soignee (GER)	Suivez (FR)	Fioravanti (USA)	Pitasia (IRE)
Dam Soignee (GER)	Suivez (FR)	Sea Symphony (USA)	Faraway Son (USA)
Dam Soignee (GER)	Suivez (FR)	Sea Symphony (USA)	Southern Seas (GB)
