= Hillstar (horse) =

British-bred Thoroughbred racehorse

- Racing silks of Evelyn de Rothschild
- Sire: Danehill Dancer
- Grandsire: Danehill
- Dam: Crystal Star
- Damsire: Mark of Esteem
- Sex: Stallion
- Foaled: 22 February 2010
- Country: United Kingdom
- Colour: Bay
- Breeder: Southcourt Stud
- Owner: Evelyn de Rothschild
- Trainer: Michael Stoute
- Record: 20: 4-6-2
- Earnings: £774,621

Major wins
- King Edward VII Stakes (2013); Legacy Cup (2014); Canadian International Stakes (2014)

Hillstar (foaled 22 February 2010) is a British Thoroughbred racehorse and sire. After winning one minor race as juvenile he improved to become one of the best middle-distance colts of his generation in Britain, winning the King Edward VII Stakes as well as finishing third in the King George VI and Queen Elizabeth Stakes. As a four-year-old he won the Legacy Cup before recording his biggest success in the Canadian International Stakes. He raced without success in 2015 before being retired to become a breeding stallion in Ireland.

== Background ==
Hillstar is a bay horse with a white blaze bred at the Rothschild family's Southcourt Stud near Leighton Buzzard in Bedfordshire. He raced in the colours of Evelyn de Rothschild and was sent into training with Michael Stoute at the Freemason Lodge Stables in Newmarket, Suffolk. He was ridden in most of his races by Ryan Moore.

He was sired by Danehill Dancer, who won the Phoenix Stakes, National Stakes and Greenham Stakes before becoming a very successful breeding stallion. His other progeny have included Choisir, Mastercraftsman and Dancing Rain. Hillstar's dam Crystal Star won two races including the Radley Stakes and went on to become a very successful broodmare whose other foals have included Crystal Ocean, Crystal Capella (Princess of Wales's Stakes) and Crystal Zvezda (Fillies' Trial Stakes). Her dam Crystal Cavern was a half-sister to the Poule d'Essai des Pouliches winner Rose Gypsy.

== Racing career ==
=== 2012: two-year-old season ===
Hillstar began his racing career by finishing fourth in a maiden race over seven furlongs at Sandown Park Racecourse on 31 August. At Leicester Racecourse on 16 October he started 2/1 favourite for a similar event and recorded his first success as he took the lead inside the final furlong and won by three quarters of a length from Flashlight.

=== 2013: three-year-old season ===
Hillstar began his second campaign in handicap races, running second in events over ten furlongs at Newmarket Racecourse on April and Newbury Racecourse in May. At Royal Ascot on 21 June the colt was stepped up in class and distance for the Group 2 King Edward VII Stakes over one and a half miles and started the 15/2 third choice in the betting behind Battle of Marengo (winner of the Derrinstown Stud Derby Trial and fourth in the Epsom Derby) and the undefeated Mutashaded. After being restrained towards the rear of the field he made strong progress in the straight, overtook Battle of Marengo in the last 100 yards and won by a length. Michael Stoute commented "We had him in the Derby and we had him in the Irish Derby, but his first two runs this year just haven't gone right. At Newbury... he hit the gate too well and was too keen. We dropped him out today and made sure he didn't do that, but we've always loved this horse".

Over the same course and distance five weeks later, Hillstar was moved up to the highest class and matched against older horses in the King George VI and Queen Elizabeth Stakes. As he had not been among the original entries for the race, his owners had to pay a supplementary entry fee of £75,000. Starting at odds of 5/1 he stayed on well in the straight to take third place behind Novellist and Trading Leather, making him the best-placed of the four British-trained runners. His efforts earned him £114,594, more than repaying his entry fee.

In August, Hillstar was dropped back in distance for the ten and a half furlong International Stakes at York Racecourse and came home fourth of the six runners behind Declaration of War, Trading Leather and Al Kazeem. Richard Hughes took the ride in October when Hillstar ended his season by running sixth behind Farhh in Champion Stakes.

In 2013 World's Best Racehorse Rankings Hillstar was given a rating of 118, making him the 83rd best racehorse in the world.

=== 2014: four-year-old season ===
For his first run as a four-year-old Hillstar was sent to the United Arab Emirates and finished towards the rear of the field in the Dubai World Cup (won by African Story) on the synthetic Tapeta track at Meydan Racecourse in March. On his return to Europe he started odds-on favourite for the Ormonde Stakes at Chester Racecourse but was beaten by the six-year-old Brown Panther. Frankie Dettori took the ride for the colt's next two races which saw him run second to Telescope in the Hardwicke Stakes at Ascot and take the same position, a neck behind Cavalryman in the Princess of Wales's Stakes at Newmarket. When dropped to Group 3 class for the Rose of Lancaster Stakes at Haydock Park in August he finished second for the fourth consecutive time as he was beaten a length and a quarter by the outsider Amralah. On 20 September Hillstar contested the Legacy Cup over eleven furlongs and Newbury and was made the 11/4 favourite in a seven-runner field, with his opponents including Tasaday (Prix de la Nonette), Cubanita (John Porter Stakes), Quest for Peace (Glorious Stakes) and Camborne (winner of the race in 2013). After racing just behind the leaders Hillstar moved up into second place in the straight behind Tasaday before going to the front a furlong out and kept on well to win by one and a half lengths.

In October, Hillstar was sent to North America and started 5/4 favourite for the Grade I Canadian International Stakes at Woodbine Racetrack in Toronto. Michael Stoute was unable to attend but expressed the hope that his brother Douglas, the Dean and Rector of the Toronto's Anglican Cathedral might bring the horse "good fortune". Hillstar's opponents included Big Blue Kitten, The Pizza Man, Dynamic Sky (Red Smith Handicap), Reporting Star (Play the King Stakes) and War Dancer (Virginia Derby), but the race went ahead without Brown Panther, who unseated his rider and bolted before the start. With Moore in the saddle, Hillstar raced in fifth place as Reporting Star and The Pizza Man set the early pace, but moved up on the outside in the straight to take the lead a furlong out. He opened up a clear advantage and held off the late challenge of Big Blue Kitten to win by three quarters of a length. Ryan Moore commented "this race was a target for the horse a long way out and it's always something we had in the back of our minds for him, if things were going well. I moved a bit too early today but he was the best horse and we just kept it straightforward."

In 2014 World's Best Racehorse Rankings Hillstar was given a rating of 117, making him the 105th best racehorse in the world.

=== 2015: five-year-old season ===
Hillstar was kept in training as a five-year-old but failed to recapture his best form. In the summer of 2015 he finished fifth in both the Hardwicke Stakes and the Princess of Wales's Stakes before running sixth of the seven runners in the Glorious Stakes. He returned in autumn to finish fourth when attempting to repeat his 2014 success in the Legacy Cup. On 3 October he ended his racing career by finishing third behind the three-year-old Star Storm in the Cumberland Lodge Stakes at Ascot.

== Stud record ==
After his retirement from racing Hillstar became a breeding stallion at the Garryrichard Stud in County Wexford, Ireland. His first foals were born in 2017.

== Pedigree ==
Pedigree of Hillstar (GB), bay stallion, 2010
Sire Danehill Dancer (IRE) 1993	Danehill (USA); 1986	Danzig	Northern Dancer (CAN)
Sire Danehill Dancer (IRE) 1993	Danehill (USA); 1986	Danzig	Pas de Nom
Sire Danehill Dancer (IRE) 1993	Danehill (USA); 1986	Razyana	His Majesty
Sire Danehill Dancer (IRE) 1993	Danehill (USA); 1986	Razyana	Spring Adieu (CAN)
Sire Danehill Dancer (IRE) 1993	Mira Adonde (USA); 1986	Sharpen Up (GB)	Atan (USA)
Sire Danehill Dancer (IRE) 1993	Mira Adonde (USA); 1986	Sharpen Up (GB)	Rocchetta
Sire Danehill Dancer (IRE) 1993	Mira Adonde (USA); 1986	Lettre d'Amour	Caro (IRE)
Sire Danehill Dancer (IRE) 1993	Mira Adonde (USA); 1986	Lettre d'Amour	Lianga
Dam Crystal Star (GB) 2000	Mark of Esteem (IRE); 1993	Darshaan (GB)	Shirley Heights
Dam Crystal Star (GB) 2000	Mark of Esteem (IRE); 1993	Darshaan (GB)	Delsy (FR)
Dam Crystal Star (GB) 2000	Mark of Esteem (IRE); 1993	Homage (GB)	Ajdal (USA)
Dam Crystal Star (GB) 2000	Mark of Esteem (IRE); 1993	Homage (GB)	Home Love (USA)
Dam Crystal Star (GB) 2000	Crystal Cavern (USA); 1992	Be My Guest	Northern Dancer (CAN)
Dam Crystal Star (GB) 2000	Crystal Cavern (USA); 1992	Be My Guest	What A Treat
Dam Crystal Star (GB) 2000	Crystal Cavern (USA); 1992	Krisalya (GB)	Kris
Dam Crystal Star (GB) 2000	Crystal Cavern (USA); 1992	Krisalya (GB)	Sassalya (Family 7-a)

- Hillstar was inbred 4 × 4 to Northern Dancer, meaning that this stallion appears twice in the fourth generation of his pedigree.
