= Königsstuhl (horse) =

German-bred Thoroughbred racehorse (1976–1995)

- Sire: Dschingis Khan
- Grandsire: Tamerlane
- Dam: Königskrönung
- Damsire: Tiepoletto
- Sex: Stallion
- Foaled: 17 May 1976
- Country: Germany
- Colour: black/darkbay
- Breeder: Gestüt Zoppenbroich
- Owner: Gestüt Zoppenbroich
- Trainer: Sven von Mitzlaff
- Record: 20: 11-7-2

Major wins
- Frühjahrs Dreijährigen-Preis (1979); Henckel-Rennen (1979) Deutsches Derby (1979); Aral-Pokal (1979); Deutsches St. Leger (1979); G. P. der Gelsenkirchener Wirtschaft (1980); Grosser Preis von Düsseldorf (1981); Hansa-Preis (1981); Gran Premio del Jockey Club (1981)

Awards
- German Horse of the Year (1979); Champion sire (1988 and 1994)

Königsstuhl (17 May 1976 – 1995) was a German thoroughbred racehorse and sire. In 1979 he won the German Triple Crown and is the first horse that won all the races necessary for this crown. Since 1979 no other horse has won the crown. In addition to racing success, he was named German horse of 1979 and was German champion sire in 1988 and 1994.

== Background ==
Königsstuhl was a black/darkbay thoroughbred. The stallion was born at the stud Zoppenbroich in West Germany. He was a son of Dschingis Khan (1961–1986) (Tamerlane -Donna Diana) and his dam was Königskrönung (1958–† ) (Tiepoletto-Krönung).

His dam Königskrönung was a great distance horse during her racing career, but also a big horse. Her first foals were much too big for a racing career. Kurt Bresges, the stud manager and owner of stud Zoippenbroich, made some stud experiments before he took a small stallion for his big mare.

On 17 May 1976 a black/darkbay colt was born. Königsstuhl was not a beauty in his young years. He had problems with his legs and had also a big head. The farrier gave him position help for hoof correction. In October 1977, Bresges died. His wife had to take over the stud management. She gave all yearlings and also Königsstuhl to horse trainer Sven von Mitzlaff. Bresges sold most of the yearlings, but Mitzlaff advised her to keep Königsstuhl. So the horse remained in possession. In August 1995 he died of colic.

== Racing career ==
His racing career was from 1978 to 1981. Königsstuhl started 20 times and won eleven races. He raced in Germany and Italy.

In June 1978 Königsstuhl started his racing career. He ran in a German trail run (Versuchsrennen der Hengste, Köln) about 1.000 m and came in second after My Rocket (Rocket – Macoletta). Next he won his maiden race: Limbo-Rennen Gelsenkirchen – 1200 m.

In spring 1979 he qualified for the German Derby (Ger-Gr. I 2400m) and won the German 2000-Guineas (Ger-Gr. 2). In the summer of 1979 he won the German Derby (Ger-Gr. 1 2400m). After this he won some important races and in autumn 1979 he won the German St. Leger (Ger-Gr. II 2800m) to complete the German Triple Crown.

On 25 October 1980, Königsstuhl was sent to Italy to contest the Group One Gran Premio del Jockey Club over 2400 metres. Ridden by Peter Alafi, he started as a 6/5 favourite and won by five lengths from Solero.

=== Racing results ===
1978 1st Limbo-Rennen 1000m 2nd Versuchsrennen der Hengste 1200m

1979 1st Preis der Frankfurter Messe 1600m, Blitz Tip Pokal (Frühjahrs Dreijährigen Preis) G3 2000m, Henkel-Rennen (German 2000 Guineas) G2 1600m, Deutsches Derby G1 2400m, Aral-Pokal G1 2400m. Deutsches St. Leger G2 2800m, 2nd Frühlingsrennen 1650m, Union Rennen G2 2200m, Großer Preis von Baden G1 2400m

1980 1st Großer Preis der Stadt Gelsenkirchen G3 2400m, 2nd Großer Preis von Düsseldorf G2 2200m

1981 1st Großer Preis von Düsseldorf G2 2200m, Hansa Preis G2 2200m, Gran Premio del Jockey Club Italiano G1 2400m, 2nd Gerling Preis G2 2400m, Großer Preis von Berlin G1 2400m

== Awards ==
Königsstuhl was the German Horse of the Year in 1979. Champion sire in 1988 and 1994.

== Stud record ==
Königsstuhl was one of the Germany's most successful sires. He was named as Champion sire in 1988 and in 1994.

One of his notable offspring is Monsun, a leading racehorse and sire. Another son, Lavirco, was the Deutsches Derby winner in 1996. His son Protectionist won the 2014 Melbourne Cup.

== Sire line tree ==
- Konigsstuhl
  - Helikon
  - Astylos
  - Medicus
  - Alkalde
    - Ferrari
    - Zaungast
  - Mandelbaum
  - Pik Konig
  - Monsun
    - Adronikus
    - Samum
      - Kamsin
      - Durban Thunder
      - Sordino
      - Pazifiksturm
    - Speedmaster
    - Subiaco
    - Simoun
    - Le Miracle
    - Shirocco
      - Arrigo
      - Brown Panther
      - Grand Vent
      - Windstoss
    - Arcadio
    - Manduro
      - Mandaean
      - Vazirabad
      - Iresine
    - Gentlewave
    - Getaway
    - Imonso
    - Lauro
    - Schiaparelli
    - Axxos
    - Cassini
    - Persian Storm
    - Fiorente
    - Maxios
    - Almandin
    - Protectionist
  - Caballo
  - Twen
  - Lavirco
    - Fight Club
    - Matou
    - Mikael D'Haguenet
  - Surako
  - Laveron
    - Organisedconfusion

== Pedigree ==
Pedigree of Königsstuhl (GER) 1976
Sire Dschingis Khan (GER) 1961	Tamerlane (GB) 1952	Persian Gulf	Bahram
Sire Dschingis Khan (GER) 1961	Tamerlane (GB) 1952	Persian Gulf	Double Life
Sire Dschingis Khan (GER) 1961	Tamerlane (GB) 1952	Eastern Princess	Nearco
Sire Dschingis Khan (GER) 1961	Tamerlane (GB) 1952	Eastern Princess	Cheveley Lady
Sire Dschingis Khan (GER) 1961	Donna Diana (GER) 1956	Neckar	Ticino
Sire Dschingis Khan (GER) 1961	Donna Diana (GER) 1956	Neckar	Nixe*
Sire Dschingis Khan (GER) 1961	Donna Diana (GER) 1956	Donatella	Allgau
Sire Dschingis Khan (GER) 1961	Donna Diana (GER) 1956	Donatella	Blaue Donau
Dam Königskrönung (GER) 1965	Tiepoletto (FR) 1956	Tornado	Tourbillon
Dam Königskrönung (GER) 1965	Tiepoletto (FR) 1956	Tornado	Roseola
Dam Königskrönung (GER) 1965	Tiepoletto (FR) 1956	Scarlet Skies	Blue Skies
Dam Königskrönung (GER) 1965	Tiepoletto (FR) 1956	Scarlet Skies	Scarlet Quill
Dam Königskrönung (GER) 1965	Krönung (GER) 1957	Olymp	Arjaman*
Dam Königskrönung (GER) 1965	Krönung (GER) 1957	Olymp	Olympiade
Dam Königskrönung (GER) 1965	Krönung (GER) 1957	Kaiserkrone	Nebelwerfer
Dam Königskrönung (GER) 1965	Krönung (GER) 1957	Kaiserkrone	Kaiserwurde

* Königsstuhl is inbred 5S x 4D to the stallion Arjamin, meaning that he appears fifth generation (via Nixe) on the sire side of his pedigree, and fourth generation on the dam side of his pedigree.

== See also ==
- Deutsches Derby
- German St. Leger
- Protectionist (horse)
