= Monsun =

German-bred Thoroughbred racehorse

- Sire: Königsstuhl
- Grandsire: Dschingis Khan
- Dam: Mosella
- Damsire: Surumu
- Sex: Stallion
- Foaled: 1990
- Country: Germany
- Colour: Bay
- Breeder: Gestüt Isarland
- Owner: Baron Georg von Ullmann
- Trainer: Heinz Jentzsch
- Earnings: $1.7 million

Major wins
- Frühjahrs Dreijährigen-Preis (1993); Grosser Hertie-Preis (1993); Aral-Pokal (1993); Preis von Europa (1993, 1994); Gerling-Preis (1994, 1995); Hansa-Preis (1995)

Awards
- Champion sire of Germany (2000, 2002, 2004, 2006)

Monsun (4 March 1990 – 9 September 2012) was a bay Thoroughbred racehorse and stallion bred in Germany by Gestüt Isarland and owned by Baron Georg von Ullmann.

== Background ==
Monsun was a son of Germany's first triple crown winner and champion racehorse and sire, Königsstuhl, a descendant of the influential sire, Bahram. Monsun's dam was Mosella who was sired by Surumu, a multi champion racehorse.

Monsun was a strong, 16.1hh and attractive horse. He was a high-class middle-distance racehorse who was particularly effective on rain-affected surface. His trainer was Heinz Jentzsch.

He was blind later in life. He died after an acute neurological disease at the age of 22 on 9 September 2012.

== Races ==
Monsun was a very tough competitor who ran on both soft and firm ground. He started his career at age three. He won 12 of his 23 races, including three Group 1 races (Aral Pokal) at three years old and Europa Preis at both three and four years old. He also finished second to then less-fancied stable companion Lando in the 1993 Deutsches Derby.

== Stud record ==
Monsun retired in 1996 and began his stud duty at Gestüt Schlenderhan near Cologne. At stud, he proved a revelation and sired several champion colts and fillies. In 2007, the fee for his stud service was €120,000. In 2010, he became one of Europe's four most expensive sires.

Monsun sired a total of 713 foals, 108 of whom are stakes winners, with strike rate of 15%. He was named as leading sire in Germany for four times. His notable sons are Shirocco, 2005 German Horse of the Year and winner of the 2004 Deutsches Derby and 2005 Breeders' Cup Turf, and Manduro who was ranked #1 in the World Thoroughbred Racehorse Rankings for 2007. Other offspring, Stacelita, is the 2011 Eclipse Award winner. One of his early offspring, Samum, was the winner of the 2000 Deutsches Derby. On 20 June 2013, his daughter Estimate (out of Ebaziya) won the Ascot Gold Cup for Queen Elizabeth II. In 2013 his son Fiorente beat an international quality field to win the 3200 metre Melbourne Cup. In 2014, his son Protectionist also won the Melbourne Cup. In 2016 his son Almandin trained by Robert Hickmott also won the Melbourne Cup.

Monsun is the broodmare sire of Pastorius, a German racehorse who won several G1 races in Germany and France, Sea The Moon, the 2014 Deutsches Derby winner, and Waldgeist, winner of the 2019 Prix de l'Arc de Triomphe and ranked first in the 2019 World's Best Racehorse Rankings tied with Enable and Crystal Ocean.

== Sire line tree ==
- Monsun
  - Adronikus
  - Samum
    - Kamsin
    - Durban Thunder
    - Sordino
    - Pazifiksturm
  - Speedmaster
  - Subiaco
  - Simoun
  - Le Miracle
  - Shirocco
    - Arrigo
    - Brown Panther
    - Grand Vent
    - Windstoss
  - Arcadio
  - Manduro
    - Mandaean
    - Vazirabad
    - Iresine
  - Gentlewave
  - Getaway
  - Imonso
  - Lauro
  - Schiaparelli
  - Axxos
  - Cassini
  - Persian Storm
  - Fiorente
  - Maxios
  - Almandin
  - Protectionist

== Pedigree ==
Pedigree of Monsun (GER) 1990
Sire Königsstuhl (GER) 1976	Dschingis Khan (GER) 1961	Tamerlane	Persian Gulf
Sire Königsstuhl (GER) 1976	Dschingis Khan (GER) 1961	Tamerlane	Eastern Princess
Sire Königsstuhl (GER) 1976	Dschingis Khan (GER) 1961	Donna Diana	Neckar
Sire Königsstuhl (GER) 1976	Dschingis Khan (GER) 1961	Donna Diana	Donatella
Sire Königsstuhl (GER) 1976	Königskrönung (GER) 1965	Tiepoletto	Tornado
Sire Königsstuhl (GER) 1976	Königskrönung (GER) 1965	Tiepoletto	Scarlet Skies
Sire Königsstuhl (GER) 1976	Königskrönung (GER) 1965	Krönung	Olymp
Sire Königsstuhl (GER) 1976	Königskrönung (GER) 1965	Krönung	Kaiserkrone
Dam Mosella (GER) 1985	Surumu (GER) 1974	Literat	Birkhahn
Dam Mosella (GER) 1985	Surumu (GER) 1974	Literat	Lis
Dam Mosella (GER) 1985	Surumu (GER) 1974	Surama	Reliance
Dam Mosella (GER) 1985	Surumu (GER) 1974	Surama	Suncourt
Dam Mosella (GER) 1985	Monasia (GER) 1979	Authi	Aureole
Dam Mosella (GER) 1985	Monasia (GER) 1979	Authi	Virtuous
Dam Mosella (GER) 1985	Monasia (GER) 1979	Monacensia	Kaiseradler
Dam Mosella (GER) 1985	Monasia (GER) 1979	Monacensia	Motette
