= Manduro =

German-bred Thoroughbred racehorse

- Sire: Monsun
- Grandsire: Konigsstuhl
- Dam: Mandellicht
- Damsire: Be My Guest
- Sex: Stallion
- Foaled: 9 March 2002
- Died: 27 June 2020 (aged 18)
- Country: Germany
- Colour: Black/Brown
- Breeder: Rolf Brunner
- Owner: Baron Georg von Ullmann
- Trainer: Peter Schiergen; André Fabre (age 4)
- Record: 18: 10-3-4
- Earnings: £1,439,896

Major wins
- Preis des Winterfavoriten (2004); Preis der Deutschen Einheit (2005); Prix d'Harcourt (2006); Earl of Sefton Stakes (2007); Prix d'Ispahan (2007); Prince of Wales's Stakes (2007); Prix Jacques Le Marois (2007); Prix Foy (2007)

Awards
- #1 – World Thoroughbred Racehorse Rankings (2007)

Manduro (March 9, 2002 – June 27, 2020) was a World Champion Thoroughbred racehorse. He was a multiple Group One winner in Germany.

== Background ==
Sired by Monsun, he was out of the mare Mandellicht, a daughter of Northern Dancer's son Be My Guest who was the Leading sire in Great Britain & Ireland in 1982.

Manduro was purchased by Baron Georg von Ullmann, a German member of the Oppenheim banking family, who owns Gestüt Schlenderhan, one of Germany's oldest stud farms. Baron von Ullmann, who owns Manduro's sire, had previously met with considerable success in racing with a number of horses, the most notable of which was another son of Monsun, Shirocco.

Bred in Germany, Manduro was trained by André Fabre in France.

== Racing career ==
At age two and three Manduro raced in Germany under trainer Peter Schiergen where he notably won the 2004 Group III Preis des Winterfavoriten and 2005's Preis der Deutschen Einheit.

In 2006, he raced from a base in France for trainer André Fabre where he won the Group II Prix d'Harcourt at Longchamp Racecourse in Paris and finished second twice and third three times in five Group One events.

Ridden by Stéphane Pasquier, in 2007 Manduro was undefeated in five starts and the dominant horse in Europe for most of the year. He won three major races in France and two in England but came out of his win in September's Prix Foy with a cannon bone fracture that ended his racing career and which kept him out of the Prix de l'Arc de Triomphe at Longchamp Racecourse. The Arc was won by Dylan Thomas whom Manduro had earlier defeated by a length and a quarter in the Prince of Wales's Stakes.

== Assessment ==
In January 2008, the International Federation of Horseracing Authorities (IFHA) ranked Manduro No.1 in the world for 2007.

== Stud record ==
Retired to stud duty, Manduro would stand in 2008 at Sheikh Mohammed's Darley Stud. Manduro died of a heart attack at Darley Stud on June 27, 2020.

=== Major winners ===
c = colt, f = filly, g = gelding

Foaled	Name	Sex	Major wins
2012	Vazirabad	g	Prix Royal Oak, Prix du Cadran, 3× Dubai Gold Cup
2017	Iresine	g	Prix Royal-Oak, Prix Ganay

== Pedigree ==
Pedigree of Manduro
Sire Monsun	Königsstuhl	Dschingis Khan*	Tamerlane*
Sire Monsun	Königsstuhl	Dschingis Khan*	Donna Diana*
Sire Monsun	Königsstuhl	Konigskronung	Tiepoletto
Sire Monsun	Königsstuhl	Konigskronung	Kronung
Sire Monsun	Mosella	Surumu	Literat
Sire Monsun	Mosella	Surumu	Surama
Sire Monsun	Mosella	Monasia	Authi
Sire Monsun	Mosella	Monasia	Monacensia
Dam Mandellicht	Be My Guest	Northern Dancer	Nearctic
Dam Mandellicht	Be My Guest	Northern Dancer	Natalma
Dam Mandellicht	Be My Guest	What a Treat	Tudor Minstrel
Dam Mandellicht	Be My Guest	What a Treat	Rare Treat
Dam Mandellicht	Mandelauge	Elektrant	Dschingis Khan*
Dam Mandellicht	Mandelauge	Elektrant	Elektra
Dam Mandellicht	Mandelauge	Mandriale	Norfolk
Dam Mandellicht	Mandelauge	Mandriale	Mariapolis

* Manduro is inbred 3S x 4D to the stallion Dschingis Khan, meaning that he appears third generation on the sire side of his pedigree, and fourth generation on the dam side of his pedigree.
