= Shirocco =

German-bred Thoroughbred racehorse

- Sire: Monsun
- Grandsire: Königsstuhl
- Dam: So Sedulous
- Damsire: The Minstrel
- Sex: Stallion
- Foaled: 10 April 2001
- Country: Germany
- Colour: Bay
- Breeder: Baron Georg von Ullmann
- Owner: Baron Georg von Ullmann
- Trainer: Andreas Schütz; André Fabre (age 4-5)
- Record: 13: 7-1-3
- Earnings: $2,477,588

Major wins
- Deutsches Derby (2004); Gran Premio del Jockey Club (2004); Breeders' Cup Turf (2005); Coronation Cup (2006); Prix Foy (2006); Jockey Club Stakes (2006)

Awards
- German Horse of the Year (2005)
- Last updated on 20 February 2007

Shirocco (foaled 10 April 2001) is a German Thoroughbred racehorse. He was trained in his native Germany by Andreas Schütz up to the end of his three-year-old season before moving to French trainer André Fabre to race as a four and five year old.

== Background ==
Shirocco was sired by Monsun, a German racehorse and leading sire. His dam was The Minstrel mare So Sedulous who won two races when trained in England by Geoff Wragg. She was also the dam of Subiaco (winner of the Group 2 Gerling-Preis) and stakes winners Satchmo, Storm Trooper and September Storm.

== Racing career ==
Shirocco is best known for winning the Breeders' Cup Turf in 2005. He also won the 2004 Deutsches Derby. Overall, he won six major group races in five countries.

== Awards ==
In 2005 Shirocco was named German Horse of the Year.

== Stud record ==
In October 2006 he was purchased by Darley Stud and retired to Dalham Hall Stud in Newmarket, England. In seven seasons on the Darley stallion roster he sired Brown Panther (winner of the Group 1 Irish St. Leger), Windstoss (winner of the Group 1 Deutsches Derby) and Group 2 winners Arrigo, Grand Vent and Wild Coco. Before the start of the 2014 breeding season he was sold to Glenview Stud in Fermoy, County Cork, Ireland to stand as a National Hunt stallion. In 2016 his daughter Annie Power won the Champion Hurdle at the Cheltenham Festival.

== Pedigree ==
Pedigree of Shirocco (GER), bay horse, 10 April 2001
Sire Monsun (GER) 1990	Königsstuhl (GER) 1976	Dschingis Khan (GER) 1961	Tamerlane (GB) 1952
Sire Monsun (GER) 1990	Königsstuhl (GER) 1976	Dschingis Khan (GER) 1961	Donna Diana (GER) 1956
Sire Monsun (GER) 1990	Königsstuhl (GER) 1976	Konigskronung (GER) 1965	Tiepoletto (FR) 1956
Sire Monsun (GER) 1990	Königsstuhl (GER) 1976	Konigskronung (GER) 1965	Kronung (GER) 1957
Sire Monsun (GER) 1990	Mosella (GER) 1985	Surumu (GER) 1974	Literat (GER) 1965
Sire Monsun (GER) 1990	Mosella (GER) 1985	Surumu (GER) 1974	Surama (GER) 1970
Sire Monsun (GER) 1990	Mosella (GER) 1985	Monasia (GER) 1979	Authi (IRE) 1970
Sire Monsun (GER) 1990	Mosella (GER) 1985	Monasia (GER) 1979	Monacensia (GER) 1969
Dam So Sedulous (USA) 1991	The Minstrel (CAN) 1974	Northern Dancer (CAN) 1961	Nearctic (CAN) 1954
Dam So Sedulous (USA) 1991	The Minstrel (CAN) 1974	Northern Dancer (CAN) 1961	Natalma (USA) 1957
Dam So Sedulous (USA) 1991	The Minstrel (CAN) 1974	Fleur (CAN) 1964	Victoria Park (CAN) 1957
Dam So Sedulous (USA) 1991	The Minstrel (CAN) 1974	Fleur (CAN) 1964	Flaming Page (CAN) 1959
Dam So Sedulous (USA) 1991	Sedulous (IRE) 1986	Tap On Wood (IRE) 1976	Sallust (GB) 1969
Dam So Sedulous (USA) 1991	Sedulous (IRE) 1986	Tap On Wood (IRE) 1976	Cat O'Mountaine (GB) 1967
Dam So Sedulous (USA) 1991	Sedulous (IRE) 1986	Pendulina (IRE) 1978	Prince Tenderfoot (USA) 1967
Dam So Sedulous (USA) 1991	Sedulous (IRE) 1986	Pendulina (IRE) 1978	Rosemarin (GB) 1966
