= Ezeliya =

French-bred Thoroughbred racehorse

- Sire: Dubawi
- Grandsire: Dubai Millennium
- Dam: Eziyra
- Damsire: Teofilo
- Sex: Filly
- Foaled: 17 March 2021
- Country: France
- Colour: Bay
- Breeder: Aga Khan IV
- Owner: Aga Khan IV
- Trainer: Dermot Weld
- Record: 4: 3-0-0
- Earnings: £354,173

Major wins
- Salsabil Stakes (2024); Epsom Oaks (2024)

Ezeliya (foaled 17 March 2021) is a French-bred, Irish-trained Thoroughbred racehorse. As a two-year-old in 2023 she finished fourth on her debut before winning a maiden race at Cork Racecourse. In the following year she made significant improvement, taking the Salsabil Stakes before recording a decisive victory in the Epsom Oaks. She was retired from racing after a training setback in July 2024.

== Background ==
Ezeliya is a bay filly with a white coronet marks on her hind legs bred in France by her owner Aga Khan IV. The filly was sent into training with Dermot Weld at The Curragh, County Kildare. She was ridden in all of her races by Chris Hayes

She was from the fourteenth crop of foals sired by Dubawi, whose wins included the Irish 2,000 Guineas and the Prix Jacques Le Marois. At stud, Dubawi has been a highly successful breeding stallion, siring major winners such as Ghaiyyath, Too Darn Hot, Al Kazeem, Makfi, Old Persian, Lucky Nine and Night of Thunder.

Her dam Eziyra was a high-class racemare who won six races including the Blandford Stakes and finished third in the Yorkshire Oaks and the Hong Kong Vase. She was a granddaughter of Ebaziya who won four races including the Ballysax Stakes in 1992 and later became an outstanding broodmare whose other foals included Enzeli, Estimate and Edabiya. Ebaziya was descended from Marcel Boussac's broodmare Tourzima, the female-line ancestor of numerous major winners including Acamas and Darshaan

== Racing career ==
=== 2023: two-year-old season ===
Ezeliya began her racing career in a seven furlong maiden race on good ground at Leopardstown Racecourse on 24 August when she started the 2/1 second favourite in a nine-runner field. She started slowly and never looked likely to win but kept on well in the closing stages to take fourth place, five and three quarter lengths behind the Aidan O'Brien trained winner Content (later to win the Yorkshire Oaks). A month after her debut, the filly went off the 11/10 favourite for a maiden over one mile on soft ground at Cork Racecourse and recorded her first success as she recovered from a poor start to take the lead inside the last quarter mile and won by a length from Wendla.

=== 2024: three-year-old season ===
For her three-year-old debut Ezeliya was stepped up in class for the Group 3 Salsabil Stakes over ten furlongs on "good to yielding" ground at Navan Racecourse on 27 April. Starting at odds of 9/1 in a seven-runner field she raced towards the rear before staying on well in the straight, taking the lead inside the final furlong and winning by half a length from the favourite Purple Lily. Dermot Weld commented "I thought she would run a big race and she did. It was a very true-run Group race and they went a real good gallop for a mile and a quarter... I loved the way she attacked the hill and saw her race out well. Better ground will suit her better. She is a Group One filly – lots to look forward to."

On 31 May 2024, Ezeliya started the 13/2 second favourite, in a field of twelve fillies, for the 246th running of the Oaks Stakes over one and a half miles on soft ground at Epsom Downs Racecourse. The Fillies' Mile winner Ylang Ylang went off favourite, while the other contenders included Dance Sequence(Oh So Sharp Stakes), You Got To Me (Lingfield Oaks Trial), Forest Fairy (Cheshire Oaks), Caught U Looking (Weld Park Stakes) and Secret Satire (Musidora Stakes). She raced towards the rear of the field in the early stages as the 40/1 shot Making Dreams set the pace before making "smooth progress" on the outside to dispute the lead approaching the last quarter mile. She shook off the challenge of Dance Sequence and won going away by three lengths. After the race Weld, who had last won the race with Blue Wind in 1981 said "She was in great form so I felt she had a live chance. I always had confidence in my filly, who is very progressive. Chris gave her a beautiful ride. The plan was to ride her the same as at Navan, where she was dropped out last. I told Chris to take his time with her and get her into a rhythm before letting her go. I never worried about the distance with her – she's a stayer with speed."

On 6 July it was announced that Ezeliya had incurred a "setback in training" and was retired from racing. Weld commented "She was a beautiful filly to train. She wasn’t very big but she had a lot of quality and winning the Oaks with her is very special. She is certainly one of the best fillies I have trained and she has the potential to be a highly successful broodmare".

== Pedigree ==
Pedigree of Ezeliya (FR), bay filly, 2021
Sire Dubawi (IRE) 2002	Dubai Millennium (GB); 1996	Seeking The Gold (USA)	Mr. Prospector
Sire Dubawi (IRE) 2002	Dubai Millennium (GB); 1996	Seeking The Gold (USA)	Con Game
Sire Dubawi (IRE) 2002	Dubai Millennium (GB); 1996	Colorado Dancer (IRE)	Shareef Dancer (USA)
Sire Dubawi (IRE) 2002	Dubai Millennium (GB); 1996	Colorado Dancer (IRE)	Fall Aspen (USA)
Sire Dubawi (IRE) 2002	Zomaradah (GB); 1995	Deploy	Shirley Heights
Sire Dubawi (IRE) 2002	Zomaradah (GB); 1995	Deploy	Slightly Dangerous (USA)
Sire Dubawi (IRE) 2002	Zomaradah (GB); 1995	Jawaher (IRE)	Dancing Brave (USA)
Sire Dubawi (IRE) 2002	Zomaradah (GB); 1995	Jawaher (IRE)	High Tern
Dam Eziyra (IRE) 2014	Teofilo (IRE); 2004	Galileo	Sadler's Wells (USA)
Dam Eziyra (IRE) 2014	Teofilo (IRE); 2004	Galileo	Urban Sea (USA)
Dam Eziyra (IRE) 2014	Teofilo (IRE); 2004	Speirbhean	Danehill (USA)
Dam Eziyra (IRE) 2014	Teofilo (IRE); 2004	Speirbhean	Saviour (USA)
Dam Eziyra (IRE) 2014	Eytarna (IRE); 2006	Dubai Destination (USA)	Kingmambo
Dam Eziyra (IRE) 2014	Eytarna (IRE); 2006	Dubai Destination (USA)	Mysterial
Dam Eziyra (IRE) 2014	Eytarna (IRE); 2006	Ebaziya	Darshaan (GB)
Dam Eziyra (IRE) 2014	Eytarna (IRE); 2006	Ebaziya	Ezana (Family: 13-c)
