= Ebadiyla =

Irish-bred Thoroughbred racehorse

- Sire: Sadler's Wells
- Grandsire: Northern Dancer
- Dam: Ebaziya
- Damsire: Darshaan
- Sex: Mare
- Foaled: 24 March 1994
- Country: Ireland
- Colour: Bay
- Breeder: Aga Khan IV
- Owner: Aga Khan IV
- Trainer: John Oxx
- Record: 9: 3-1-2
- Earnings: £185,518

Major wins
- Irish Oaks (1997); Prix Royal Oak (1997)

Ebadiyla (foaled 24 March 1994) was an Irish Thoroughbred racehorse and broodmare. Bred and owned by the Aga Khan and trained by John Oxx she was unraced as a two-year-old in 1996 but quickly established herself as a very promising filly in the following spring with an emphatic win on her racecourse debut followed by a narrow defeat in the Derrinstown Stud Derby Trial. After finishing sixth in The Oaks she won the Irish Oaks and ended her season with a six length win in the Prix Royal-Oak. She remained in training as a four-year-old but failed to win in three races although she did finish third in a strong renewal of the Coronation Cup. After her retirement from racing she had considerable success as a dam of winners.

== Background ==
Ebadiyla was a bay mare with a white star bred in Ireland by her owner Aga Khan IV. She was trained in Ireland by John Oxx and ridden in all but one of her races by Johnny Murtagh.

She was from the ninth crop of foals sired by Sadler's Wells, who won the Irish 2,000 Guineas, Eclipse Stakes and Irish Champion Stakes in 1984 and went on to be the Champion sire on fourteen occasions. She was the first foal of her dam Ebaziya, who won four races including the Ballysax Stakes in 1992 and later became an outstanding broodmare whose other foals included Enzeli, Estimate and Edabiya. She was descended from Marcel Boussac's broodmare Tourzima, the female-line ancestor of numerous major winners including Acamas and Darshaan

== Racing career ==
=== 1997: three-year-old season ===
Ebadiyla made her racecourse debut in a maiden race over ten furlongs at the Curragh Racecourse on 12 April 1997. Starting at odds of 9/2 in a field of eleven colts and fillies she won by four lengths from Dr Johnson. The filly was again matched against male opposition when she was stepped up in class to contest the Group 3 Derrinstown Stud Derby Trial at Leopardstown Racecourse on 11 May over the same distance . She was made the 2/1 favourite but lost out in a three-way photo finish to the colts Ashley Park and Casey Tibbs. John Oxx later commented "She was a bit green that day, but when she got going she finished very strongly and we were very happy with her. It was a competitive, well-run race at a distance short of her best".

On 6 June at Epsom Racecourse Ebadiyla started the 15/2 third favourite in a twelve-runner field for the 218th running of the Oaks Stakes. She led the field approaching the final quarter mile but was then overtaken and finished sixth behind Reams of Verse having been hampered in the last furlong. In the Irish Oaks at the Curragh on 11 July the filly started the 9/2 second choice in the betting behind the Henry Cecil-trained Yashmak who had finished fourth in the Epsom Oaks before winning the Ribblesdale Stakes at Royal Ascot. The other nine runners included the French-trained Brilliance (winner of the Prix Saint-Alary), Strawberry Roan (runner-up in the Irish 1,000 Guineas) and Etoile (fifth in the Epsom Oaks). After tracking the leaders until the final turn, Murtagh made a forward move on the inside in the straight. Ebadiyla overtook Yashmak approaching the final furlong and drew away to win by three lengths from the favourite with Brilliance a head away in third. Following the race Johnny Murtagh commented "Ebadiyla loves to see a bit of daylight and once I got her in the clear on the inner two furlongs down she picked up well and went about her business".

After her win at the Curragh, Ebadiyla was off the track for twelve weeks before returning in Europe's most prestigious weight-for-age race, the Prix de l'Arc de Triomphe over 2400 metres at Longchamp Racecourse on 5 October. She started a 54/1 outsider in an eighteen-runner field and finished twelfth behind Peintre Celebre. Three weeks later the filly returned to Longchamp for the Prix Royal-Oak over 3200 metres. Her ten opponents included Further Flight, Oscar Schindler (Irish St. Leger), Bahamian Knight (Derby Italiano), Grey Shot (Goodwood Cup), Double Eclipse (Prix Vicomtesse Vigier), Stetarez (Prix Vicomtesse Vigier), Camporese (Prix Corrida) and Nothin' Leica Dane (Victoria Derby). Ridden by Gerald Mosse she was restrained towards the rear of the field before turning into the straight in sixth place. She took the lead 200 metres from the finish and accelerated clear of her rivals to win by six lengths from Snow Princess. Following the filly's second Group 1 win Oxx said "She was a bit rusty for the Arc after a long break but that break seems to have put her right for today." Mosse commented "Ebadiyla is clearly a very good filly The going here was more congenial for her than in the Arc."

=== 1998: four-year-old season ===
Ebadiyla began her third campaign in the Tattersalls Gold Cup over ten furlongs at the Curragh on 24 May and ran poorly, finishing last of the five runners behind Daylami. She produced a much better effort in the Coronation Cup at Epsom on 5 June when she finished third behind Silver Patriarch and Swain, beaten a length and a half by the winner. On what proved to be her final start Ebadiyla was dropped in class for the Listed Ballycullen Stakes over fourteen furlongs at Leopardstown on 23 August. She started the odds-on favourite but was beaten into second place by the three-year-old filly On Call.

The filly was entered in the Irish St. Leger but was withdrawn shortly before the start of the race after showing signs of bleeding. An intended second run in the Prix de l'Arc de Triomphe did not materialise and she was retired from racing at the end of the year.

== Breeding record ==
After being retired from racing Ebadiyla became a broodmare for the Aga Khan's stud. She produced twelve foals and ten winners between 2000 and 2013:

- Ebatana, a bay filly, foaled in 2000, sired by Rainbow Quest. Failed to win in four races.
- Ebaziyan, grey colt (later gelded), 2001, by Daylami. Won two flat races and four National Hunt races including the Supreme Novices' Hurdle.
- Ehsan, chestnut colt (gelded), 2002, by Sinndar. Won one flat race and one National Hunt race.
- Eyshal, bay colt (later gelded), 2004, by Green Desert. Won two races including the Centenary Vase.
- Ebalista, chestnut filly, 2005, by Selkirk. Won one race, dam of Ebiyza (Prix de Royallieu).
- Ebashan, bay colt, 2006, by King's Best. Won one race.
- Ebanour, chestnut colt (gelded), 2007, by Indian Ridge. Won three National Hunt races.
- Ebazziyr, bay colt, 2008, by Cape Cross. Won two National Hunt races.
- Ebaniya, bay filly, 2010, by Sinndar. Failed to win in four races.
- Ebanoran (AKA Lotus Breeze), bay colt (gelded), 2011, by Oasis Dream. Won four races: disqualified after finishing first in the Derrinstown Stud Derby Trial.
- Edelpour, grey colt (gelded), 2012, by Mastercraftsman. Won two races.
- Ebediyin, bay colt, 2013, by Raven's Pass. Won two races.

== Pedigree ==
Pedigree of Ebadiyla (IRE), bay mare, 1994
Sire Sadler's Wells (USA) 1981	Northern Dancer (CAN); 1961	Nearctic	Nearco
Sire Sadler's Wells (USA) 1981	Northern Dancer (CAN); 1961	Nearctic	Lady Angela
Sire Sadler's Wells (USA) 1981	Northern Dancer (CAN); 1961	Natalma	Native Dancer
Sire Sadler's Wells (USA) 1981	Northern Dancer (CAN); 1961	Natalma	Almahmoud
Sire Sadler's Wells (USA) 1981	Fairy Bridge (USA); 1975	Bold Reason	Hail To Reason
Sire Sadler's Wells (USA) 1981	Fairy Bridge (USA); 1975	Bold Reason	Lalun
Sire Sadler's Wells (USA) 1981	Fairy Bridge (USA); 1975	Special	Forli
Sire Sadler's Wells (USA) 1981	Fairy Bridge (USA); 1975	Special	Thong
Dam Ebaziya (IRE) 1989	Darshaan (GB); 1981	Shirley Heights	Mill Reef
Dam Ebaziya (IRE) 1989	Darshaan (GB); 1981	Shirley Heights	Hardiemma
Dam Ebaziya (IRE) 1989	Darshaan (GB); 1981	Delsy	Abdos
Dam Ebaziya (IRE) 1989	Darshaan (GB); 1981	Delsy	Kelty
Dam Ebaziya (IRE) 1989	Ezana (IRE); 1983	Ela-Mana-Mou	Pitcairn
Dam Ebaziya (IRE) 1989	Ezana (IRE); 1983	Ela-Mana-Mou	Rose Bertin
Dam Ebaziya (IRE) 1989	Ezana (IRE); 1983	Evisa	Dan Cupid
Dam Ebaziya (IRE) 1989	Ezana (IRE); 1983	Evisa	Albanilla (Family: 13-c)
