= Dance Design =

Irish-bred Thoroughbred racehorse

- Sire: Sadler's Wells
- Grandsire: Northern Dancer
- Dam: Elegance In Design
- Damsire: Habitat
- Sex: Mare
- Foaled: 18 February 1993
- Country: Ireland
- Colour: Bay
- Breeder: Moyglare Stud
- Owner: Moyglare Stud; Padua Stables
- Trainer: Dermot Weld; D. Wayne Lukas
- Record: 19: 7-3-3

Major wins
- Debutante Stakes (1995); Pretty Polly Stakes (1996, 1997); Irish Oaks (1996); Mooresbridge Stakes (1996); Tattersalls Gold Cup (1996)

Honours
- Dance Design Stakes at the Curragh

Dance Design (foaled 18 February 1993) is an Irish Thoroughbred racehorse and broodmare. She competed in five different countries and won seven times from nineteen starts in a track career which lasted from August 1995 to November 1998.

She showed very promising form as a two-year-old when she won her first two races including the Debutante Stakes and finished fourth in both the Moyglare Stud Stakes and the Prix Marcel Boussac. In the following year, she was placed in the Irish 1,000 Guineas and the Coronation Stakes before winning the Pretty Polly Stakes and then recording her biggest success in the Irish Oaks. As a four-year-old she won the Mooresbridge Stakes, Tattersalls Gold Cup and a second Pretty Polly but was beaten in her four subsequent races that year. In 1997, she raced in the United States, but made no impact.

After her retirement from racing, she became a broodmare and produced several minor winners.

== Background ==
Dance Design was a bay mare bred in Ireland by her owner, Walter Haefner's Moyglare Stud. She was sent into training with Dermot Weld at the Curragh in County Kildare and was ridden in most of her races by Mick Kinane.

She was from the seventh crop of foals sired by Sadler's Wells, who won the Irish 2000 Guineas, Eclipse Stakes and Irish Champion Stakes in 1984 went on to be the Champion sire on fourteen occasions. Dance Designs dam Elegance In Design showed good form over sprint distances, winning a Listed race over six furlongs at Phoenix Park Racecourse as a three-year-old in 1989. She was a distant, female-line descendant of Star of Naples, a full-sister to Signorinetta.

== Racing career ==
=== 1995: two-year-old season ===
Dance Design began her track career in a seven furlong maiden race at Galway Races on 1 August, in which she started the 4/7 favourite and won by two and a half lengths from the Jim Bolger-trained Park Petard. At the end of the month she was stepped up in class for the Listed Debutante Stakes over the same distance at Leopardstown Racecourse and won again, beating Priory Belle by one and a half lengths at odds of 4/6. The filly was moved into Group 1 class for her two remaining races of 1995 and ran well in defeat on both occasions. On 10 September, she looked somewhat unlucky when finishing fourth behind Priory Belle in the Moyglare Stud Stakes at the Curragh, while at Longchamp Racecourse on 1 October, she finished fourth behind Miss Tahiti, Shake The Yoke and Solar Crystal in the Prix Marcel Boussac.

=== 1996: three-year-old season ===
On her first appearance as a three-year-old Dance Design started 5/1 third favourite for the Irish 1000 Guineas at the Curragh on 25 May and finished second to the British-trained Matiya. On 19 June, she was sent to England to contest the Coronation Stakes at Royal Ascot and led for most of the way before being overtaken in the final furlong and finishing third to Shake The Yoke and Last Second. Ten days after her defeat at Ascot, the filly was stepped up in distance for the Group 2 Pretty Polly Stakes over ten furlongs at the Curragh and started favourite ahead of the hitherto undefeated Theano and the British challenger Obsessive (third in the Musidora Stakes). After racing in third place she went to the front two furlongs from the finish and went clear of her rival to win "comfortably" by one and a half lengths from Zafzala.

Dance Design was moved up again in distance when she was one of six fillies to contest the Irish Oaks over one and a half miles at the Curragh on 14 July and started the 9/2 second favourite behind Lady Carla who had won The Oaks by nine lengths. The other four runners were Shamadara (Prix de Malleret), Key Change, Tout A Coup (Cheshire Oaks), and French Ballerina (later to win the Supreme Novices' Hurdle). Dance Design was retrained in the early stages and turned into the straight in fourth place behind Lady Carla, Key Change and Shamadara. Shamadara overtook the favourite in the last quarter mile, but was soon joined by Dance Design who gained the advantage inside the final furlong. The French filly rallied strongly and appeared to regain the lead, but Dance Design came back again in the final strides and won by short head. After the race, Weld commented "She will have a nice break before the autumn", Weld said. "She will probably run in the Prix Vermeille, and could stay in training next year".

After a two-month break, Dance Design returned for the Irish Champion Stakes over ten furlongs at Leopardstown in which she was matched against older horses and male opposition. She led for most of the way, but was overtaken in the final furlong and beaten a length and a half by the four-year-old filly Timarida.

=== 1997: four-year-old season ===
Dance Design's third campaign began in the Listed Mooresbridge Stakes at the Curragh on 3 May when she was ridden for the first and only time by Pat Shanahan. Carrying top weight of 130 pounds she started odds-on favourite and on by a short head from Raiyoun with a gap of ten lengths back to Tout A Coup in third. Three weeks later, over the same course and distance, the filly faced stronger opposition in the Group 2 Tattersalls Gold Cup but her task was made considerably easier when the favourite Dr Massini refused to race. She won by three lengths from the Irish St Leger winner Oscar Schindler with Taipan three lengths further back in third.

On 28 June, Dance Design started 4/9 favourite as she attempted to repeat her 1996 success in the Pretty Polly Stakes. She led from the start, accelerated away from her six rivals in the last quarter mile and won by two and a half lengths in "impressive" style despite being eased down by Kinane in the final strides. She was then sent to Germany for the Bayerisches Zuchtrennen over 2000 metres at Munich on 3 August but after leading for most of the way she was overtaken in the closing stages and beaten half a length by the locally trained five-year-old Oxalagu. Three weeks later, she made her North American debut in the Beverly D. Stakes over nine and a half furlongs at Arlington Park. She was made favourite but as in Germany she faded in the closing stages after setting the early pace and finished third behind Memories of Silver and Maxzene.

Dance Design raced in California in the late autumn but failed to reproduce her best form in two starts. home last of the eleven runners in the Breeders' Cup Turf at Hollywood Park Racetrack six days later.

In December 1997, Dance Design was put up for sale at Tattersalls and was bought for 2.5 million guineas by the Florida-based Padua Stables. The price was a record for a filly sold at auction in Europe. She was relocated permanently to the United States, where she was trained by D. Wayne Lukas.

=== 1998: five-year-old season ===
As a five-year-old, Dance Design did not reappear until the autumn and then made little impression in three races. She finished last of seven in the Grade II Turfway Breeders' Cup Stakes at Turfway Park on 26 September and then finished third in an ungraded Bryan Station Stakes at Keeneland in October. She ended her racing career on 7 November at Churchill Downs, when she ran unplaced in the Grade III Cardinal Handicap.

== Honours ==
Dance Design is honoured in the name the Dance Design Stakes a race for fillies run at the Curagh which was founded in 2005.

== Breeding record ==
At the end of her racing career Dance Design returned to Europe and became a broodmare for her new owner Martyn Arbib. She produced at least six foals and four winners between 2000 and 2005:

- Sindy, a bay filly, foaled in 2000, sired by A.P. Indy. Won one race.
- Science Academy, chestnut filly, 2001, by Silver Hawk. Won two races.
- Swindon, bay filly, 2002, by Kingmambo. Failed to win in seven races.
- Dance to the Band, bay filly, 2003, Kingmambo. Failed to win in nine races.
- Salsa Steps, chestnut filly, 2004, by Giant's Causeway. Won two races.
- Water Boys, bay colt (later gelded), 2005, by Seeking The Gold. Won three races in Japan.

== Pedigree ==
Pedigree of Dance Design (IRE), bay mare, 1993
Sire Sadler's Wells (USA) 1981	Northern Dancer (CAN); 1961	Nearctic	Nearco
Sire Sadler's Wells (USA) 1981	Northern Dancer (CAN); 1961	Nearctic	Lady Angela
Sire Sadler's Wells (USA) 1981	Northern Dancer (CAN); 1961	Natalma	Native Dancer
Sire Sadler's Wells (USA) 1981	Northern Dancer (CAN); 1961	Natalma	Almahmoud
Sire Sadler's Wells (USA) 1981	Fairy Bridge (USA); 1975	Bold Reason	Hail To Reason
Sire Sadler's Wells (USA) 1981	Fairy Bridge (USA); 1975	Bold Reason	Lalun
Sire Sadler's Wells (USA) 1981	Fairy Bridge (USA); 1975	Special	Forli
Sire Sadler's Wells (USA) 1981	Fairy Bridge (USA); 1975	Special	Thong
Dam Elegance in Design (IRE) 1986	Habitat (USA); 1966	Sir Gaylord	Turn-To
Dam Elegance in Design (IRE) 1986	Habitat (USA); 1966	Sir Gaylord	Somethingroyal
Dam Elegance in Design (IRE) 1986	Habitat (USA); 1966	Little Hut	Occupy
Dam Elegance in Design (IRE) 1986	Habitat (USA); 1966	Little Hut	Savage Beauty
Dam Elegance in Design (IRE) 1986	Areola (GB); 1968	Kythnos	Nearula
Dam Elegance in Design (IRE) 1986	Areola (GB); 1968	Kythnos	Capital Issue
Dam Elegance in Design (IRE) 1986	Areola (GB); 1968	Alive Alivo	Never Say Die
Dam Elegance in Design (IRE) 1986	Areola (GB); 1968	Alive Alivo	Fluorescent (Family: 23-a)
