= Sil Sila =

Irish-bred Thoroughbred racehorse

- Sire: Marju
- Grandsire: Last Tycoon
- Dam: Porto Alegre
- Damsire: Habitat
- Sex: Mare
- Foaled: 18 February 1993
- Country: Ireland
- Colour: Bay
- Breeder: L A C International
- Owner: Turquoise Trading
- Trainer: Bryan Smart
- Record: 7: 3-1-1
- Earnings: £212,285

Major wins
- Radley Stakes (1995); Prix de Diane (1996)

Sil Sila (18 February 1993 – after 2014) was an Irish-bred British-trained Thoroughbred racehorse and broodmare. She was not highly regarded as a two-year-old in 1995 but won both of her races at long odds including the Listed Radley Stakes. In the following spring she was placed in both the Fred Darling Stakes and the Musidora Stakes before recording a 30/1 upset victory in the Prix de Diane. She was unplaced on her only subsequent start and retired from racing at the end of the year. She had no success as a broodmare.

== Background ==
Sil Sila was a bay mare bred in Ireland by her owner Luis Álvarez de Cervera's breeding company L A C International. As a foal in November 1993 she was offered for sale at Goffs but failed to make her modest reserve price of IR£9,500. During her racing career she carried the colours of Álvarez de Cervera's Turquoise Trading. The filly was sent into training with Bryan Smart at Lambourn in Berkshire. Smart recalled "She was a sweet filly... but she had an offset knee and could be lazy at home. If you were a gallop watcher you certainly wouldn't have picked her out as a future classic winner. However there was something about her that made her special".

She was sired by the Irish stallion Marju who finished second in The Derby and won the St James's Palace Stakes in 1991. Marju sired several other major winners including Satono Crown, Soviet Song, My Emma, Viva Pataca and Indigenous. Sil Sila's dam Porto Alegre was an unraced mare, the best of whose other offspring was the Group-placed winner Frequent Flyer.

== Racing career ==
=== 1995: two-year-old season ===
Sil Sila made her racecourse debut in a maiden race over seven furlongs on good to soft ground at Warwick Racecourse on 3 October in which she was ridden by the apprentice jockey Seb Sanders. Starting a 50/1 outsider, she belied her odds, as she tracked the leaders before taking the lead inside the final furlong and winning by one and a quarter lengths from Hilaala. The full-time professional Ray Cochrane took the ride when the filly was stepped up in class for the Listed Radley Stakes at Newbury Racecourse eighteen days later but she was given little chance and started at odds of 25/1 against eight opponents. After being restrained in the early stages she went to the front approaching the final furlong and drew away to win by three and a half lengths.

=== 1996: three-year-old season ===
On her first run of 1996 Sil Sila contested the Listed Masaka Stakes over one mile at Kempton Park Racecourse on 6 April and sustained her first defeat as she came home seventh of the thirteen runners behind Sea Spray. Two weeks later, in the Fred Darling Stakes (a major trial race for the 1000 Guineas) at Newbury she proved no match for Bosra Sham and was beaten eight lengths into third place. She was then stepped up in trip to ten and a half furlongs at York Racecourse on 14 May for the Musidora Stakes, a race which often serves as a trial for the Epsom Oaks. Racing on good to firm ground she started the 12/1 outsider in a five-runner field but stayed on well in the closing stages and finished second to Magnificient Style.

On 9 June Sil Sila was sent to France for the Prix de Diane over 2100 metres at Chantilly Racecourse in which she was ridden by the American jockey Cash Asmussen and started a 30/1 outsider in a twelve-runner field. The Prix Saint-Alary winner Luna Wells went off favourite, while the other runners included Matiya, Khalisa (Prix Cléopâtre), Miss Tahiti (Prix Marcel Boussac) and Solar Crystal (May Hill Stakes). After racing towards the rear of the field, Sil Sila was hampered when she attempted to make a forward move in the straight and was switched left to deliver her challenge on the outside. She took the lead in the last 100 metres and won by a length from Miss Tahiti, with a gap of two and a half lengths back to Matiya in third. On the day after Sil Sila's victory Bryan Smart reported "We've had a lot of faxes with offers for her. I've had her since she was a two-year-old and have ridden her in all her work. It would be a wrench to see her go, but then business is business. Still, they can't take away what I have done with her... It's fabulous to win a race like this. I'm a small trainer with a good filly".

After a two-month break, Sil Sila returned in the Yorkshire Oaks over one and a half miles in August. She started at 9/2, the shortest odds of her career, but began to struggle in the straight and was eased down by Cochrane to come home last of the nine runners behind Key Change. Post-race tests revealed an abnormal white blood cell count: Smart commented "Sil Sila has a mild infection and things have probably been worsened by the journey up to York and all the hurly burly".

In December 1996 Sil Sila was put up for auction at Tattersalls but failed to reach her reserve price.

== Breeding record ==
Sil Sila was retired from racing to become a broodmare for her owner's stud. She produced at least nine foals between 1998 and 2013, none of whom showed any racing ability:

- La-Sayida, a bay filly, foaled in 1998, sired by Fairy King. Failed to win in two races.
- King Sila, bay colt, 1999, by Desert King. Failed to win in two races.
- Silesian, bay filly, 2002, by Singspiel. Unraced.
- Sol Mi Fa, bay filly, 2003, by Distant Music. Failed to win in six races.
- Serenella, filly, 2005, by Bahri. Unraced.
- Marhaba, bay filly, 2008, by Nayef. Failed to win in one race.
- Halkirk, bay colt (later gelded), 2009, by Nayef. Failed to win in two races.
- Nigwah, bay filly, 2012, by Montjeu. Failed to win in one race.
- Royal Tulip, bay horse, 2013, by Turtle Bowl. Exported to Kazakhstan.
- Elita, bay filly, 2014, by Air Chief Marshal.

== Pedigree ==
Pedigree of Sil Sila (IRE), bay mare, 1993
Sire Marju (IRE) 1988	Last Tycoon (IRE); 1983	Try My Best (USA)	Northern Dancer (CAN)
Sire Marju (IRE) 1988	Last Tycoon (IRE); 1983	Try My Best (USA)	Sex Appeal
Sire Marju (IRE) 1988	Last Tycoon (IRE); 1983	Mill Princess	Mill Reef (USA)
Sire Marju (IRE) 1988	Last Tycoon (IRE); 1983	Mill Princess	Irish Lass (GB)
Sire Marju (IRE) 1988	Flame of Tara (IRE); 1980	Artaius (USA)	Round Table
Sire Marju (IRE) 1988	Flame of Tara (IRE); 1980	Artaius (USA)	Stylish Pattern
Sire Marju (IRE) 1988	Flame of Tara (IRE); 1980	Welsh Flame (GB)	Welsh Pageant (FR)
Sire Marju (IRE) 1988	Flame of Tara (IRE); 1980	Welsh Flame (GB)	Electric Flash
Dam Porto Alegre (GB) 1975	Habitat (USA); 1966	Sir Gaylord	Turn-To (IRE)
Dam Porto Alegre (GB) 1975	Habitat (USA); 1966	Sir Gaylord	Somethingroyal
Dam Porto Alegre (GB) 1975	Habitat (USA); 1966	Little Hut	Occupy
Dam Porto Alegre (GB) 1975	Habitat (USA); 1966	Little Hut	Savage Beauty
Dam Porto Alegre (GB) 1975	Powerscourt (IRE); 1970	Salvo (USA)	Right Royal (FR)
Dam Porto Alegre (GB) 1975	Powerscourt (IRE); 1970	Salvo (USA)	Manera (FR)
Dam Porto Alegre (GB) 1975	Powerscourt (IRE); 1970	Kew (GB)	Princely Gift
Dam Porto Alegre (GB) 1975	Powerscourt (IRE); 1970	Kew (GB)	Astrentia (IRE) (Family: 1-o)
