= Radley Stakes =

Flat horse race in Britain

Radley Stakes
2025
Leading Dancer	Caim	Ourbren

Previous years
2024
Ellaria Sand	Saqqara Sands	Sea To Sky
2022
Magical Sunset	Fully Wet	Direct Security
2021
Jumbly	Breeze Easy	Siamsa

2020-2011
2020
Love Is You	Gift List	Little Rollright
2018
Iconic Choice	Glance	Ice Gala
2017
Hikmaa	Shepherd Market	Expressiy
2016
Cristal Fizz	Glitter Girl	Pichola Dance
2015
Light Music	Make Fast	Fourth Way
2014
Russian Punch	Shagah	Sweet Dream
2013
Aqlaam Vision	Oxsana	Dutch Romance
2012
Need You Now	Momalorka	Lilbourne Eliza
2011
Pimpernel	Semayyel	Fillionaire

2010-2001
2010
Zoowraa	Flood Plain	Sweetie Time
2009
Electric Feel	Za Za Zoom	Pipette
2008
Summer Fete	Rosy Mantle	Yorksters Girl
2007
Lady Deauville	Missit	Maramba
2006
Party	Hollow Ridge	Easy Lover
2005
Short Dance	Cantabria	Asaawir
2004
Bibury Flyer	Wedding Party	Sheboygan
2003
Secret Charm	Hathrah	Ticker Tape
2002
Crystal Star	Garmoucheh	Al Ihtithar

2000-1991
2000
Relish The Thought	Blushing Bride	Lipica
1999
Corinium	Iftiraas	Aretha
1997
Ffestiniog	Amabel	Leggera
1996
Boojum	Fernanda	Etoile
1995
Sil Sila	Pacific Grove	Needham Star
1994
Circa	Hiwaya	Dashing Water
1993
Bearall	Palana	Clyde Goddess
1992
Criquette	Bright Spells	No Reservations
1991
Soiree	Snow Forest	Cochabamba

1990-1988
1990
Shaima	Brockette	Glowlamp
1989
Berry's Dream	Cosmic Princess	Nafzawa
1988
Lucky Song	Flamingo Pond	Rose Campion

The Radley Stakes is a Listed flat horse race in Great Britain open to fillies aged two years only. It is run at Newbury over a distance of 7 furlongs (1,408 metres), and it is scheduled to take place each year in October. It is currently known for sponsorship reasons as the D&H Racing Stakes.

== Winners ==
Year	Winner	Jockey	Trainer	Time
1978	Light O'Battle	Brian Procter	Dick Hern	1:31.14
1979	Shoot A Line	Brian Rouse	Dick Hern	1:37.85
1980	Boathouse	Willie Carson	Dick Hern	1:38.18
1981	Last Feather	Steve Cauthen	Barry Hills	1:34.50
1982	Abandoned due to waterlogging
1983	Betsy Bay	Bruce Raymond	Michael Jarvis	1:34.54
1984	River Spey	Paul Cook	Ian Balding	1:39.29
1985	Colorspin	Walter Swinburn	Michael Stoute	1:30.27
1986	Nettle	Willie Carson	Dick Hern	1:35.86
1987	Sparrow's Air	Brian Rouse	Barry Hills	1:37.49
1988	Lucky Song	Ray Cochrane	Luca Cumani	1:33.29
1989	Berry's Dream	Adam Shoults	Robert Armstrong	1:38.74
1990	Shaima	Jimmy Fortune	Luca Cumani	1:38.18
1991	Soiree	Darryll Holland	Barry Hills	1:31.62
1992	Criquette	Frankie Dettori	Luca Cumani	1:38.32
1993	Bearall	Brian Rouse	Richard Hannon Sr.	1:34.46
1994	Circa	Jason Weaver	Geoff Lewis	1:37.39
1995	Sil Sila	Ray Cochrane	Bryan Smart	1:33.21
1996	Boojum	Tony Clark	Barry Hills	1:36.11
1997	Ffestiniog	Richard Quinn	Paul Cole	1:32.54
1998	Abandoned due to waterlogging
1999	Corinium	Willie Ryan	Henry Cecil	1:38.36
2000	Relish The Thought	Michael Hills	Barry Hills	1:32.85
2001	Abandoned due to waterlogging
2002	Crystal Star	Jimmy Fortune	Sir Michael Stoute	1:33.35
2003	Secret Charm	Michael Hills	Barry Hills	1:28.73
2004	Bibury Flyer	Seb Hitchcott	Mick Channon	1:35.94
2005	Short Dance	Richard Hughes	Barry Hills	1:28.27
2006	Party	Ryan Moore	Richard Hannon Sr.	1:33.25
2007	Lady Deauville	Eddie Ahern	Paul Blockley	1:29.80
2008	Summer Fete	Tom Eaves	Bryan Smart	1:32.41
2009	Electric Feel	Andrea Atzeni	Marco Botti	1:31.45
2010	Zoowraa	Philip Robinson	Michael Jarvis	1:30.52
2011	Pimpernel	Frankie Dettori	Mahmood Al Zarooni	1:24.60
2012	Need You Now	Jamie Spencer	Peter Chapple-Hyam	1:30.68
2013	Aqlaam Vision	William Buick	Clive Brittain	1:34.23
2014	Russian Punch	Graham Lee	James Given	1:31.81
2015	Light Music	Pat Cosgrave	William Haggas	1:29.76
2016	Cristal Fizz	Frankie Dettori	William Haggas	1:27.42
2017	Hikmaa	Adam Beschizza	Ed Vaughan	1:28.84
2018	Iconic Choice	Franny Norton	Tom Dascombe	1:28.21
2019	Abandoned due to waterlogging
2020	Love is You	Jason Watson	Roger Charlton	1:35.89
2021	Jumbly	Hollie Doyle	Roger Charlton	1:28.58
2022	Magical Sunset	James Doyle	Richard Hannon Jr.	1:29.93
2023	Abandoned due to waterlogging
2024	Ellaria Sand	David Egan	Ollie Sangster	1:32.67
2025	Leading Dancer	William Buick	Karl Burke	1:31.42

== See also ==
- Horse racing in Great Britain
- List of British flat horse races
