= Ebaziya =

Irish-bred Thoroughbred racehorse

- Sire: Darshaan
- Grandsire: Shirley Heights
- Dam: Ezana
- Damsire: Ela-Mana-Mou
- Sex: Mare
- Foaled: 18 March 1989
- Country: Ireland
- Colour: Bay
- Breeder: The Aga Khan's Studs
- Owner: Aga Khan
- Trainer: John Oxx
- Record: 9: 4-2-2
- Earnings: £39,031

Major wins
- Ballysax Stakes (1992); Oyster Stakes (1992); Trigo Stakes (1992)

Ebaziya (foaled 18 March 1989) is a retired Irish-bred Thoroughbred racehorse and mare who won three Listed races. As a broodmare, she has bred four individual Group 1 winners.

== Background ==
Ebaziya was foaled on 18 March 1989 and was bred at the Aga Khan's Studs. She was sired by Darshaan. Ebaziya's dam is Ezana, hailed also from the Aga Khan's Studs. Ezana was bought by Jim and Mary McDonald of Herbage Stud in 1994. Ebaziya is a granddaughter of Dan Cupid's daughter, Evisa.

Ebaziya was trained by John Oxx. She was given to Queen Elizabeth II as an 80th birthday present by Aga Khan in 2006.

== Racing career ==
Ebaziya won three listed races in Ireland. At 2 years, she was the winner of the Ratoath Fillies race. At 3 years, she won three races, Ballysax Stakes, Oyster Stakes and Trigo Stakes, all in Leopardstown. She was ridden by Johnny Murtagh.

== Stud record ==
Ebaziya has 14 offspring. She went to stud in 1993 and her first mate was Sadler's Wells, producing Ebadiyla. Other offspring include Ebaza, Ebaraya (by Sadler's Wells), Elapour (by Sadler's Wells), Edallora (by Refuse To Bend), Elasouna (by Rainbow Quest), Ebatana (by Rainbow Quest), Elbasana, Erzen (foaled 17 March 2005, by Daylami), Eytarna (by Dubai Destination), and Ezbek (by Rainbow Quest). After being given to the Queen, Ebaziya was sent to German sire Monsun, resulting Estimate in 2009 when she was 20.

Eight of Ebaziya's offspring are the winners of various races. Four won the races at Group 1 level, the 1997 Irish Oaks and the Prix Royal Oak winner Ebadiyla, and the 1998 Moyglare Stud Stakes scorer Edabiya. In addition, Enzeli and Estimate are the winners of the Ascot Gold Cup in 1999 and 2013, respectively. Estimate won it for Queen Elizabeth II.

== Assessment ==
Ebaziya was rated 97 at two years and 111 at three years by Timeform.

== Pedigree ==
Pedigree of Ebaziya (IRE)
Sire Darshaan (GB) 1981	Shirley Heights (GB); 1975	Mill Reef	Never Bend
Sire Darshaan (GB) 1981	Shirley Heights (GB); 1975	Mill Reef	Milan Mill
Sire Darshaan (GB) 1981	Shirley Heights (GB); 1975	Hardiemma	Hardicanute
Sire Darshaan (GB) 1981	Shirley Heights (GB); 1975	Hardiemma	Grand Cross
Sire Darshaan (GB) 1981	Delsy (FR); 1972	Abdos	Arbar
Sire Darshaan (GB) 1981	Delsy (FR); 1972	Abdos	Pretty Lady
Sire Darshaan (GB) 1981	Delsy (FR); 1972	Kelty	Venture
Sire Darshaan (GB) 1981	Delsy (FR); 1972	Kelty	Marilla
Dam Ezana 1983	Ela-Mana-Mou (IRE); 1976	Pitcairn	Petingo
Dam Ezana 1983	Ela-Mana-Mou (IRE); 1976	Pitcairn	Border Bounty
Dam Ezana 1983	Ela-Mana-Mou (IRE); 1976	Pose Bertin	High Hat
Dam Ezana 1983	Ela-Mana-Mou (IRE); 1976	Pose Bertin	Wide Awake
Dam Ezana 1983	Evisa (FR); 1968	Dan Cupid	Native Dancer
Dam Ezana 1983	Evisa (FR); 1968	Dan Cupid	Vixenette
Dam Ezana 1983	Evisa (FR); 1968	Albanilla	Pharis
Dam Ezana 1983	Evisa (FR); 1968	Albanilla	Tourzima
