= Poppy seed defence =

Commonly cited reason to avoid any sanction for failing a drug test

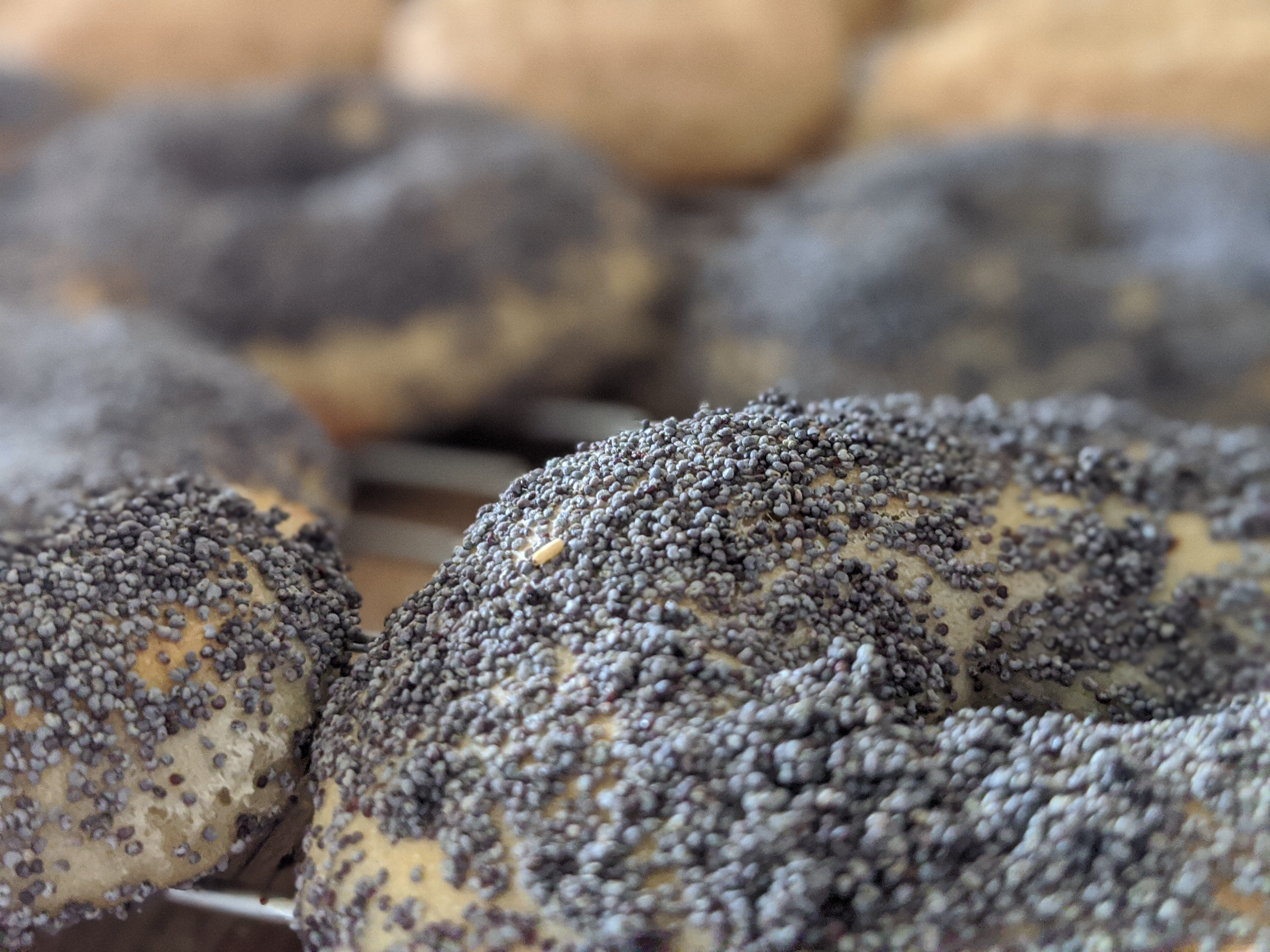
A poppy seed bagel may be used as part of the poppy seed defence.

The poppy seed defence is a commonly cited reason to avoid any sanction for failing a drug test. The defence asserts that a suspect's positive result was a result of the person having consumed poppy seeds prior to taking the test. It has been recognised in medical and legal fields as a valid defence.

== Medical basis ==
The poppy seed effect has long been recognised in the medical profession. Poppy seeds from the opium poppy have been used to make heroin and even after going through treatment for consumption, opiate alkaloids and traces of morphine can seep into the food. In the United States before 1998, 300 nanograms of opiate per millilitre (ng/ml) was sufficient to fail a drug test. However, due to the recognition of the poppy seed defence, the United States Department of Health and Human Services raised the threshold concentration to 2,000 ng/ml (equivalent to three poppy seed bagels) to reduce the possibility of a false positive. However, some hospitals still use the old standards. As a result, false positives can lead to legal actions. It has also been cited as a reason for urinary drug testing to be considered unreliable. It has been advised by medical scientists that data received from drug testing should be carefully examined as a result of the effect.

Some scientists have been working on ways in which to counter the poppy seed defence. In 2014, researchers from King's College London claimed that the presence of a glucuronide metabolite called ATM4G, which is present in heroin but not in poppy seeds, can determine whether a positive test was a result of drug or poppy seed consumption.

== Use of the defence ==
In 2011, a New Zealand triathlete avoided a doping ban after testing positive for opiates after having consumed poppy seeds before an event. In 2020, a woman in Alabama, United States lost custody of her newborn baby because doctors found traces of opiate in her urine. This was later attributed to poppy-seed bread she had eaten and the baby was returned.

The defence has also been recognised in equestrianism. In 2013, the racehorse Estimate, owned by Queen Elizabeth II, failed a drug test that was attributed to contaminated feed in the stables, which contained poppy seeds. The horse's trainer faced no sanction as a result of the poppy seed defence. Two years later, the International Federation for Equestrian Sports formally recognised the "poppy seed defence" for riders of horses found to have consumed feed contaminated with poppy seeds.
