= Key Change =

Irish-bred Thoroughbred racehorse

- Sire: Darshaan
- Grandsire: Shirley Heights
- Dam: Kashka
- Damsire: The Minstrel
- Sex: Mare
- Foaled: 10 May 1993
- Country: Ireland
- Colour: Bay
- Breeder: Aga Khan IV
- Owner: Lady Clague
- Trainer: John Oxx
- Record: 9: 4-2-1
- Earnings: £170,693

Major wins
- Ballysax Stakes (1996); Yorkshire Oaks (1996)

Key Change (foaled 10 May 1993) was an Irish Thoroughbred racehorse and broodmare best known for winning the Yorkshire Oaks in 1996. After winning one of her two starts as a juvenile she improved when moved up to longer distances as a three-year-old, winning the Ballysax Stakes on her seasonal debut. She was placed in both the Ribblesdale Stakes and the Irish Oaks before winning the Group One Yorkshire Oaks in August. She went on to finish second in the Irish St Leger but failed on her only start in 1997. After her retirement from racing she had success as a dam of winners.

== Background ==
Key Change was a bay mare bred in Ireland by the Aga Khan. She was sired by Darshaan who won the Prix du Jockey Club for the Aga Khan in 1984 before becoming a successful breeding stallion. The best of his other offspring included Dalakhani, Mark of Esteem and Kotashaan. Key Change dam Kashka was a daughter of Kalkeen, whose other descendants have included Kahyasi and Milan.

She was owned during her racing career by Lady Clague (born Margaret Isolin Cowley), the widow of the entrepreneur Douglas Clague. The filly was trained in Ireland by John Oxx and was ridden in all but two of her races by Johnny Murtagh.

== Racing career ==
=== 1995: two-year-old season ===
Key Change began her racing career in a one mile race for juvenile fillies at Navan Racecourse on 18 October. She started the 7/4 favourite but finished fourth of the eighteen runners behind the Kevin Prendergast-trained Anwaar. Twelve days later she contested a maiden race over the same distance at Leopardstown Racecourse and recorded her first success, beating the colt Clear Blue Water by a short head.

=== 1996: three-year-old season ===
On her three-year-old debut, Key Change was matched against colts and started a 12/1 outsider for the Listed Ballysax Stakes over ten furlongs at Leoprdstown on 12 April. With Murtagh on the Oxx stable's more fancied runner Harghar (the 2/1 favourite), the filly was partnered by Dermot Hogan. Key Change recorded her first significant victory as she came home six lengths clear of Harghar. Two weeks later she started favourite for the Avonmore Classic Trial at Gowran Park and won by one and a half lengths from the Aidan O'Brien-trained His Excellence.

The filly was sent to England and moved up sharply in class to contest the Group Two Ribblesdale Stakes at Royal Ascot on 20 June in which she was ridden by Christy Roche she started the 13/2 third choice in the betting behind the Musidora Stakes winner Magnificent Style. After starting poorly she made steady progress in the straight and finished second, beaten a neck by the French-trained Tulipa, with Shemozzle in third. At the Curragh Racecourse on 14 July she was one of six fillies to contest the Irish Oaks and finished third, beaten a short head and two lengths by Dance Design and Shamadara, with The Oaks winner Lady Carla in fourth.

In the Group One Yorkshire Oaks at York Racecourse on 21 August, Key Change started at odds of 7/1 in a nine-runner field. Before the race John Oxx had been pessimistic about her chances as he felt that the going would be too firm for her to show her best form. Shamadara started favourite ahead of the Prix de Diane winner Sil Sila and the 1995 Prix de Royallieu winner Russian Snows. The other runners were Shemozzle, Papering (runner-up in the Nassau Stakes), Whitewater Affair (Lupe Stakes) as well as Mezzogiorno and Quota (first and second in the Fillies' Trial Stakes). Murtagh positioned her just behind the leaders as first Russian Snows, then Quota, then Shemozzle set the pace before sending the filly to the front at half way. She stayed on strongly up the long York straight and won by one and three quarter lengths and a neck from Papering and Mezzogiorno. After the race Oxx said "I knew she was better today than before the Irish Oaks but I didn't really believe she would win. But she has won so well that we will have to consider the Irish St Leger or Prix Vermeille". When asked about running the filly in the Prix de l'Arc de Triomphe, a race for which she had not been initially entered, he added "We'd be happy to supplement if she won another race and had put some more money in the bank, Her owner loves to tackle big races".

On 21 September Key Change was matched against colts and older horses in the Irish St Leger over fourteen furlongs at the Curragh and was made the 11/4 favourite. After tracking the leaders she took the lead entering the straight but was overtaken approaching the final furlong and was beaten into second by the four-year-old Oscar Schindler.

=== 1997: four-year-old season ===
Key Change remained in training as a four-year-old but made only one appearance when she was sent to France for the Prix Jean de Chaudenay over 2400 metres at Saint-Cloud Racecourse on 18 May. She began to struggle before entering the straight and was eased down by Murtagh to finish tailed-off last of the five runners. She reportedly returned from the race "a sick horse" and despite recovering later in the year she did not race again.

== Breeding record ==
Key Change was retired from racing to become a broodmare for Lady Clague's Newberry Stud. She produced at least six winners from eight foals:

- Calorando, a bay colt (later gelded), foaled in 1999, sired by Green Desert. Won five races.
- Carenage, bay filly, 2000, by Alzao. Won one race.
- Cantari, bay filly, 2001, by Priolo. Failed to win in five races.
- Sandtime, bay filly, 2004, by Green Desert. Won one race.
- Interchange, bay filly, 2005, by Montjeu. Won one race.
- Pittoni, bay colt (later gelded), 2006, by Peintre Celebre. Won nine races including the Spring Juvenile Hurdle.
- Keyaza, bay filly, 2007, by Azamour. Won one race.
- Key To Dance, bay filly, 2009, by Dansili. Failed to win in two races.

== Pedigree ==
Pedigree of Key Change (IRE), bay mare, 1993
Sire Darshaan (GB) 1981	Shirley Heights (GB); 1975	Mill Reef	Never Bend
Sire Darshaan (GB) 1981	Shirley Heights (GB); 1975	Mill Reef	Milan Mill
Sire Darshaan (GB) 1981	Shirley Heights (GB); 1975	Hardiemma	Hardicanute
Sire Darshaan (GB) 1981	Shirley Heights (GB); 1975	Hardiemma	Grand Cross
Sire Darshaan (GB) 1981	Delsy (FR); 1972	Abdos	Arbar
Sire Darshaan (GB) 1981	Delsy (FR); 1972	Abdos	Pretty Lady
Sire Darshaan (GB) 1981	Delsy (FR); 1972	Kelty	Venture VII
Sire Darshaan (GB) 1981	Delsy (FR); 1972	Kelty	Marilla
Dam Kashka (USA) 1983	The Minstrel (CAN); 1974	Northern Dancer	Nearctic
Dam Kashka (USA) 1983	The Minstrel (CAN); 1974	Northern Dancer	Natalma
Dam Kashka (USA) 1983	The Minstrel (CAN); 1974	Fleur	Victoria Park
Dam Kashka (USA) 1983	The Minstrel (CAN); 1974	Fleur	Flaming Page
Dam Kashka (USA) 1983	Kalkeen (IRE); 1974	Sheshoon	Precipitation
Dam Kashka (USA) 1983	Kalkeen (IRE); 1974	Sheshoon	Noorani
Dam Kashka (USA) 1983	Kalkeen (IRE); 1974	Gioia	Crepello
Dam Kashka (USA) 1983	Kalkeen (IRE); 1974	Gioia	Bara Bibi (Family: 5-e)
