= Oscar Schindler (horse) =

Irish-bred Thoroughbred racehorse

- Sire: Royal Academy
- Grandsire: Nijinsky
- Dam: Saraday
- Damsire: Northfields
- Sex: Stallion
- Foaled: 4 February 1992
- Country: Ireland
- Colour: Chestnut
- Breeder: Oliver Lehane
- Owner: Oliver Lehane
- Trainer: Kevin Prendergast
- Record: 20: 5-3-4
- Earnings: £281,864

Major wins
- Ormonde Stakes (1996); Hardwicke Stakes (1996); Irish St. Leger (1996, 1997)

Oscar Schindler (4 February 1992 – 13 February 2007) was an Irish Thoroughbred racehorse and stallion best known for being the second horse to win two runnings of the Irish St. Leger. In a racing career which lasted from October 1994 until November 1997 he competed in five different countries and won five of his twenty starts.

After winning his only race as a two-year-old in 1994, he failed to win in the following year but ran prominently in several major races. He reached his peak as a four-year-old in 1996, winning the Ormonde Stakes, Hardwicke Stakes and Irish St. Leger as well a finishing third in the Prix de l'Arc de Triomphe. In the following year he won a second Irish St. Leger and finished fourth in the Prix de l'Arc de Triomphe. He remained in training as a six-year-old but had injury problems and was retired from racing.

Oscar Schindler was not a successful breeding stallion but he did sire some winners under National Hunt rules.

== Background ==
Oscar Schindler was a "giant" chestnut horse with a white blaze bred in Ireland by his owner Oliver Lehane. During his track career he was trained at the Curragh by Kevin Prendergast.

His sire, Royal Academy, won the July Cup at Newmarket and the Breeders' Cup Mile in 1990. At stud, the best of his other winners included the Sussex Stakes winner Ali-Royal and the Hong Kong champion Bullish Luck. Oscar Schindler's dam, Saraday, was a granddaughter of the broodmare Place d'Étoile whose other descendants have included Northern Treasure and Arabian Queen.

== Racing career ==
=== 1994 & 1995: Two- and three-year-old seasons ===
Oscar Schindler began his racing career in a seven furlong race at Fairyhouse on 1 October 1994 in which he was ridden by Willie Supple. He started the 5/4 favourite and won by four lengths from the filly Venusia.

As a three-year-old Oscar Schindler failed to win in five races but put up some very good performances in defeat. After finishing second in the Leopardstown 2,000 Guineas Trial on his seasonal debut he was stepped up to the highest class for the Irish 2,000 Guineas at the Curragh Racecourse and finished sixth, less than two lengths behind the winner Spectrum. When moved up in distance for the Irish Derby in July he started a 33/1 outsider but finished fourth to Winged Love with Classic Cliche and Celtic Swing finishing further behind. He ran fourth in the Royal Whip Stakes in August and ended his season in the Irish St. Leger over fourteen furlongs at the Curragh in September. Ridden by Supple, he came home third behind Strategic Choice and Moonax with the favoured Vintage Crop in fourth.

=== 1996: Four-year-old season ===
Oscar Schindler began his third campaign by finishing second (as odds-on favourite) in a minor race at Leopardstown in April and was then sent to England for the Group 3 Ormonde Stakes over thirteen furlongs at Chester Racecourse on 9 May. Ridden for the first time by Mick Kinane he started the 11/4 second favourite behind the St Leger runner-up Minds Music in a field which also included Further Flight and The Oaks runner-up Dance A Dream. He was always traveling well and took the lead in the closing stages to win "readily" by one and a half lengths from Election Day.

In June at Royal Ascot Oscar Schindler started 7/4 favourite ahead of Election Day, Annus Mirabilis and Dance A Dream for the Group 2 Hardwicke Stakes. With Kinane again in the saddle he took the lead a furlong out and ran on strongly under pressure to win by half a length from Annus Mirabilis. He was then moved back up to Grade 1 level for the King George VI and Queen Elizabeth Stakes over the same course and distance in July and came home fourth of the eight runners behind Pentire, Classic Cliche and Shaamit.

Stephen Craine partnered the horse on 21 September when Oscar Schindler made his second bid to win the Irish St. Leger and started 4/1 second choice in the betting behind the three-year-old filly Key Change. The best fancied of the other seven runners were Sacrament (Great Voltigeur Stakes, Prix Jean de Chaudenay), Posidonas (Gran Premio d'Italia) and Gordi (Queen's Vase). After being restrained in the early stages Oscar Schindler turned into the straight in fourth place before moving up into second place two furlongs from the finish. He overtook the filly approaching the final furlong, accelerated away from the field and won by three and a half lengths. Craine commented "I was always travelling easily, I was always going to win".

Fifteen days after his Leger win the horse was sent to France to contest Europe's most prestigious weight-for-age race, the Prix de l'Arc de Triomphe over 2400 metres at Longchamp Racecourse. Ridden by Cash Asmussen he made very good progress in the straight to finish third behind Helissio and Pilsudski. For his final run of the year Oscar Schindler was sent to Australia for the Melbourne Cup at Flemington Racecourse on 5 November. He was made the 4/1 favourite but never looked likely to win and finished fifteenth of the twenty-two runners.

=== 1997: Five-year-old season ===
Oscar Schindler began his fourth season of racing by finishing second to the filly Dance Design in the Tattersalls Gold Cup on 25 May but twelve days later in the Coronation Cup at Epsom Racecourse he ran poorly when coming home last of the five runners behind Singspiel.

The horse was off the course for over two months before returning in the Royal Whip Stakes in August when he finished a close third behind King Alex and Rayouni. On 20 September, Oscar Schindler attempted to become the first horse to win two runnings of the Irish St. Leger and started the 2/1 joint favourite alongside his old rival Classic Cliche. The other five runners were Persian Punch, Whitewater Affair (John Porter Stakes), Samraan (King George V Stakes), Family Tradition (Debutante Stakes) and the undefeated Stage Affair. Stephen Craine settled the horse in fifth place before moving up into third place behind Whitewater Affair and Persian Punch in the straight. Oscar Schindler took the lead a furlong and a half from the finish and kept on well to win by two lengths from Persian Punch with a gap of two and a half lengths back to Whitewater Affair in third. Kevin Prendergast commented "He'll improve for that and it's all systems go for the Arc".

In October Oscar Schindler ran for the second time in the Prix de l'Arc de Triomphe. He started at odds of 12.3/1 and stayed on in the straight and finished fourth of the eighteen runners behind Peintre Celebre, Pilsudski and the German filly Borgia. Later that month he finished third to Ebadiyla in the Prix Royal-Oak over 3100 metres at Longchamp. He ended his season with a trip to Tokyo Racecourse for the Japan Cup on 23 November and finished unplaced behind Pilsudski.

Oscar Schindler remained in training as a six-year-old but never reached the racecourse. In early spring he was sent to race in Dubai but sustained an injury and returned to Europe. He was being prepared for a fourth run in the Irish St. Leger when he suffered another injury and was retired. Prendergast said "He had a bit of a problem out in Dubai and he got over that, but then he got another small problem and we thought it better to retire him in case anything else happened. He has been a good servant. He is not quite the best horse I trained, that would be Nebbiolo, but he is one of the better ones."

== Stud record ==
After his retirement from racing Oscar Schindler was retired to become a breeding stallion in Ireland where he was primarily used as a sire of National Hunt horses. By far the most successful of his offspring was Schindlers Hunt who won five races including the Durkan New Home Novice Chase and the Arkle Novice Chase.

== Pedigree ==
Pedigree of Oscar Schindler (IRE), chestnut horse, 1992
Sire Royal Academy (USA) 1987	Nijinsky (CAN); 1967	Northern Dancer	Nearctic
Sire Royal Academy (USA) 1987	Nijinsky (CAN); 1967	Northern Dancer	Natalma
Sire Royal Academy (USA) 1987	Nijinsky (CAN); 1967	Flaming Page	Bull Page
Sire Royal Academy (USA) 1987	Nijinsky (CAN); 1967	Flaming Page	Flaring Top
Sire Royal Academy (USA) 1987	Crimson Saint (USA); 1969	Crimson Satan	Spy Song
Sire Royal Academy (USA) 1987	Crimson Saint (USA); 1969	Crimson Satan	Papila
Sire Royal Academy (USA) 1987	Crimson Saint (USA); 1969	Bolero Rose	Bolero
Sire Royal Academy (USA) 1987	Crimson Saint (USA); 1969	Bolero Rose	First Rose
Dam Saraday (IRE) 1980	Northfields (USA); 1968	Northern Dancer	Nearctic
Dam Saraday (IRE) 1980	Northfields (USA); 1968	Northern Dancer	Natalma
Dam Saraday (IRE) 1980	Northfields (USA); 1968	Little Hut	Occupy
Dam Saraday (IRE) 1980	Northfields (USA); 1968	Little Hut	Savage Beauty
Dam Saraday (IRE) 1980	Etoile Grise (IRE); 1972	Sea Hawk	Herbager
Dam Saraday (IRE) 1980	Etoile Grise (IRE); 1972	Sea Hawk	Sea Nymph
Dam Saraday (IRE) 1980	Etoile Grise (IRE); 1972	Place d'Etoile	Kythnos
Dam Saraday (IRE) 1980	Etoile Grise (IRE); 1972	Place d'Etoile	Etoile de France (Family: 9-e)

- Oscar Schindler was inbred 3 × 3 to Northern Dancer meaning that this stallion appears twice in the third generation of his pedigree.
