= Estimate (horse) =

Irish-bred Thoroughbred racehorse

- Racing colours of Queen Elizabeth II, as used by her father King George VI and great-grandfather King Edward VII: Purple, gold braid, scarlet sleeves, black velvet cap, gold fringe
- Sire: Monsun
- Grandsire: Königsstuhl
- Dam: Ebaziya
- Damsire: Darshaan
- Sex: Filly
- Foaled: 4 April 2009 (age 16)
- Country: Ireland
- Colour: Bay
- Breeder: The Aga Khan's Studs
- Owner: Queen Elizabeth II
- Trainer: Sir Michael Stoute
- Record: 13: 5-1-2
- Earnings: £374,228

Major wins
- Queen's Vase (2012); Sagaro Stakes (2013); Ascot Gold Cup (2013); Doncaster Cup (2014)

Awards
- Cartier Champion Stayer (2013)

Estimate (foaled 4 April 2009) is an Irish-bred, British-trained Thoroughbred racehorse who won the Queen's Vase at Royal Ascot as a three-year-old. As a four-year-old she won the Sagaro Stakes before returning to Royal Ascot to win the Gold Cup. She was owned by Queen Elizabeth II and trained by Sir Michael Stoute. In 2014 she tested positive to morphine in a post race drugs test and was disqualified from second place in the Gold Cup, but went on to win the Doncaster Cup.

== Background ==
Estimate is a bay filly bred by the Aga Khan's Studs and foaled on 4 April 2009. She was sired by Monsun, who won the Europa Preis twice. He was also a successful stallion, siring Shirocco, Manduro and Stacelita. Estimate's dam is Ebaziya, a daughter of Darshaan. Ebaziya was trained by John Oxx and won three Listed races in Ireland, including the Ballysax Stakes. The 2009 produce of Ebaziya was made available to Queen Elizabeth II as part of an 80th birthday present from the Aga Khan. She was sent to German sire Monsun, resulting Estimate. She is the 14th and last foal of Ebaziya and one of her eight winning offspring.

Estimate's half-brother, Enzeli, also won the Gold Cup in 1999. Estimate is trained by Sir Michael Stoute.

== Racing career ==
=== 2011: two-year-old season ===
Estimate's only race as a two-year-old was a maiden over 8 1/2 furlongs at Leicester. She was slowly away at the start and raced in the rear for most of the race. She made a few places up near the end of the race and finished in seventh, about eight lengths behind winner Esentepe. Esentepe went on to win the Nell Gwyn Stakes the following season.

=== 2012: three-year-old season ===
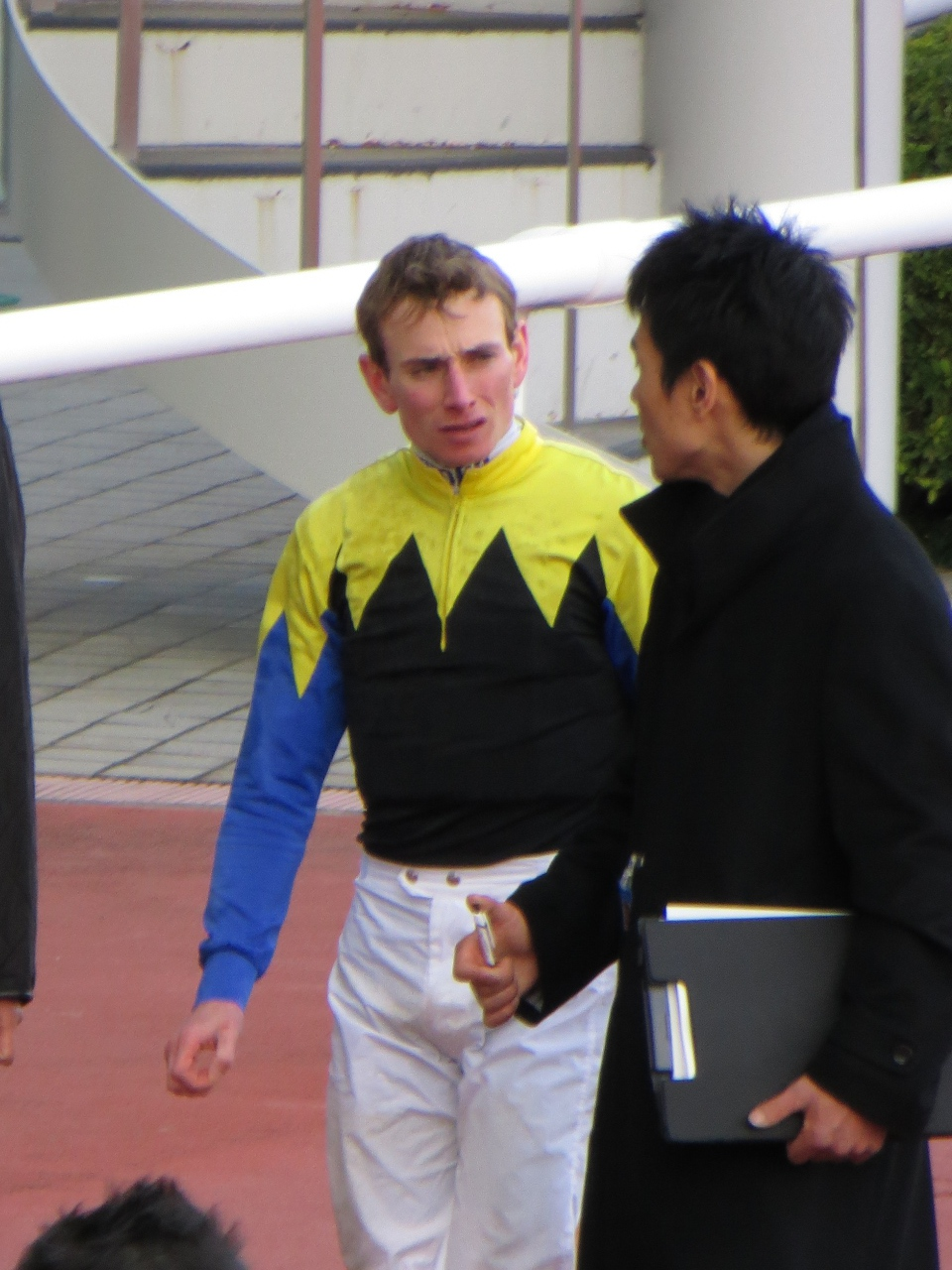
Estimate's regular jockey Ryan Moore

Estimate started her three-year-old career in a twelve furlong maiden at Salisbury. She started the race at the price of 12/1 and was positioned in the middle of the pack by jockey Pat Dobbs. She took the lead with over one furlong left to run and stayed on to win by two and three-quarters of a length from Mysterious Man. Despite only winning a maiden she started as the 3/1 favourite for the Queen's Vase at Royal Ascot. Estimate was ridden by Ryan Moore for the first time, who placed her in the middle of the field. She began to move through the field three furlongs out and took the lead two out. At the end of the race she pulled clear to win by five lengths from Athens. Ed De Gas was a further length and a half behind in third place, with Macbeth in fourth.

At Glorious Goodwood she contested the Lillie Langtry Stakes. In the closing stages she was unable to catch leader Wild Coco and was just overtaken by Jehannedarc in the final few yards, finishing third, about three lengths behind winner Wild Coco. Estimate faced Wild Coco again in the Park Hill Stakes in September. She pulled three lengths clear with one furlong left to run, but was overhauled by Wild Coco and Hazel Lavery, eventually finishing third, one and three quarter lengths behind winner Wild Coco.

=== 2013: four-year-old season ===
In the Sagaro Stakes, Estimate followed the leaders until making her challenge in the closing stages of the race. She took the lead one furlong out and won by one and three-quarters of a length from Caucus, with Sir Graham Wade a further half length back in third place.

In June she returned to Ascot for the Royal meeting and contested the Ascot Gold Cup, her first attempt at Group 1 level. Saddler's Rock led the race for the first few furlongs, with Estimate, ridden by regular jockey Ryan Moore, near also near the front. Moore asked for an effort as they turned into the finishing straight and took the lead from Colour Vision with one furlong still to run. Estimate was challenged by Simenon and Top Trip, but held on to win by a neck from Simenon. Top Trip was a further length behind in third, with Colour Vision finishing fourth. The Queen was due to present the trophy to the winner, but it was instead presented by her son Prince Andrew. Estimate's victory was the first time the Gold Cup had been won by the reigning monarch.

On her only subsequent appearance in 2013, Estimate started 2/1 favourite for the British Champions Long Distance Cup at Ascot on 19 October, but made no impact, finishing seventh of the twelve runners behind Royal Diamond.

=== 2014: five-year-old season ===
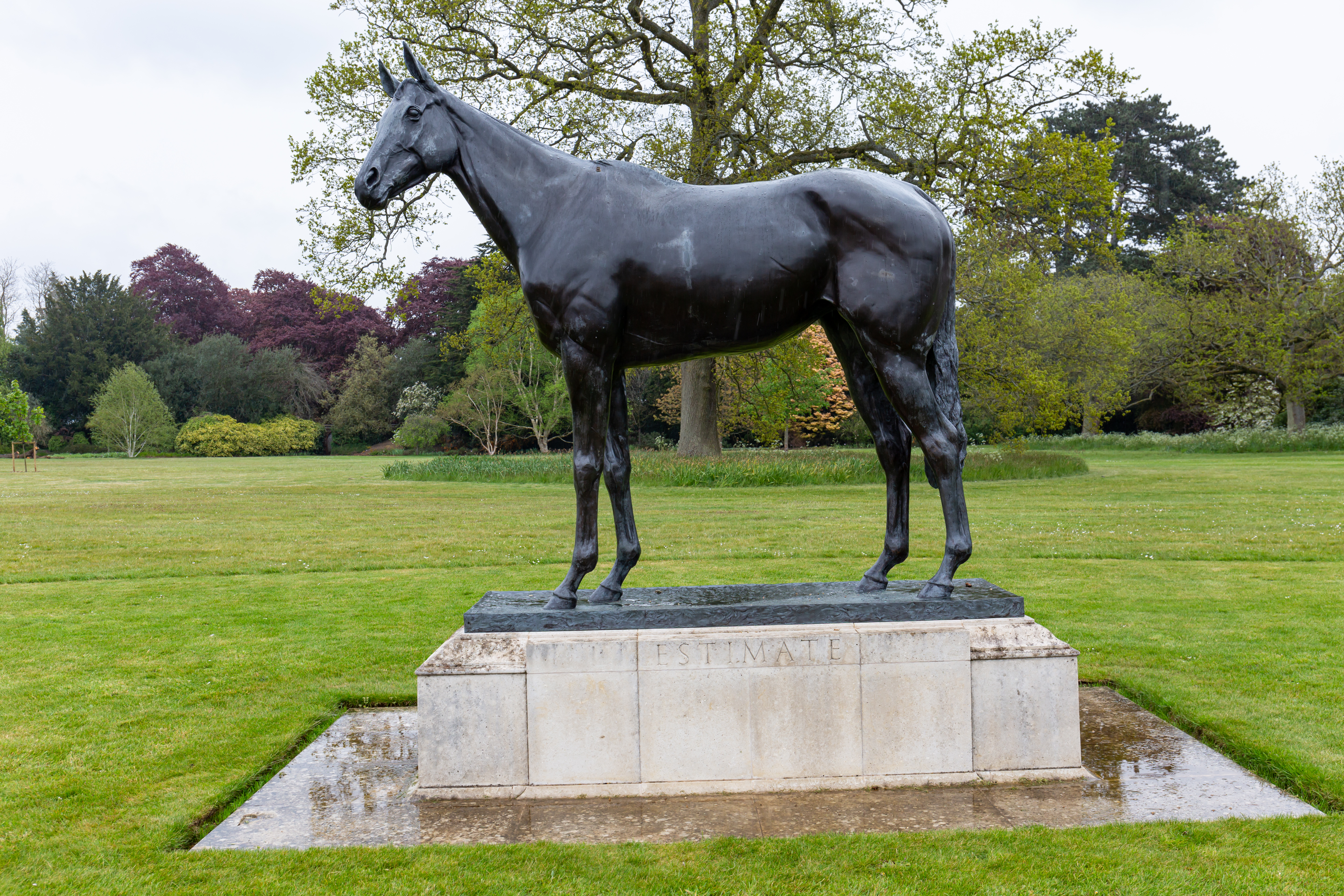
Sculpture of Estimate at Sandringham House

Estimate remained in training as a five-year-old, with the Gold Cup as her objective. She suffered from muscular problems in her right hind leg and Stoute was unable to give her a trial race before she ran in the Gold Cup on 19 June. Starting at odds of 8/1 she raced in mid-division before moving up to challenge the leaders in the straight. In a closely contested finish she was beaten into second place, a neck behind the 2013 St Leger winner Leading Light. Ryan Moore reportedly described the mare's performance as a "career best".

In a post race drugs test, Estimate tested positive to morphine, a drug banned on race days, and was disqualified from second place in the Gold Cup. The drug is believed to have been in contaminated food. Four other horses also tested positive to the drug. Her trainer faced no sanction as a result of the poppy seed defence. The filly finished last of the eight runners when starting 2/1 favourite for the Goodwood Cup on 31 July, but returned to form at York in August when she finished second to the Irish mare Pale Mimosa in the Lonsdale Cup.

On 12 September Estimate started the 11/8 favourite for the Doncaster Cup against eleven opponents headed by Time's Up, who had won the last two runnings of the race. Moore positioned the mare just behind the leaders before moving forward in the straight. She took the lead from Brass Ring approaching the final furlong and held on in the closing stages to win by one and a quarter lengths from the six-year-old gelding Whiplash Willie with the 80/1 outsider Kalann in third. After the race Moore said "She was never going to get beat today. She travelled sweetly and she battles away. I never really asked for a serious question and there was plenty left in the tank". On her final racecourse appearance the mare ran for the second time in the British Long Distance Cup and started at odds of 8/1. Racing on heavy ground she tired badly in the last half-mile and finished last of the nine runners behind Forgotten Rules.

Estimate was retired to the Royal Stud at the end of that season and the following Spring covered by Dubawi by whom she had a colt foal in early 2016. She returned to be covered by Dubawi in 2016.

== Pedigree ==
Pedigree of Estimate (IRE), bay mare 2009
Sire Monsun (GER) 1990	Konigsstuhl (GER); 1976	Dschingis Khan	Tamerlane
Sire Monsun (GER) 1990	Konigsstuhl (GER); 1976	Dschingis Khan	Donna Diana
Sire Monsun (GER) 1990	Konigsstuhl (GER); 1976	Konigskronung	Tiepoletto
Sire Monsun (GER) 1990	Konigsstuhl (GER); 1976	Konigskronung	Kronung
Sire Monsun (GER) 1990	Mosella (GER); 1985	Surumu	Literat
Sire Monsun (GER) 1990	Mosella (GER); 1985	Surumu	Surama
Sire Monsun (GER) 1990	Mosella (GER); 1985	Monashia	Authi
Sire Monsun (GER) 1990	Mosella (GER); 1985	Monashia	Monacensia
Dam Ebaziya (IRE) 1989	Darshaan (GB); 1981	Shirley Heights	Mill Reef
Dam Ebaziya (IRE) 1989	Darshaan (GB); 1981	Shirley Heights	Hardiemma
Dam Ebaziya (IRE) 1989	Darshaan (GB); 1981	Delsy	Abdos
Dam Ebaziya (IRE) 1989	Darshaan (GB); 1981	Delsy	Kelty
Dam Ebaziya (IRE) 1989	Ezana (IRE); 1983	Ela-Mana-Mou	Pitcairn
Dam Ebaziya (IRE) 1989	Ezana (IRE); 1983	Ela-Mana-Mou	Rose Bertin
Dam Ebaziya (IRE) 1989	Ezana (IRE); 1983	Evisa	Dan Cupid
Dam Ebaziya (IRE) 1989	Ezana (IRE); 1983	Evisa	Albanilla
