= 1996 King George VI and Queen Elizabeth Stakes =

46th King George VI and Queen Elizabeth Stakes
- King George VI and Queen Elizabeth Stakes
- Location: Ascot Racecourse
- Date: 27 July 1996
- Winning horse: Pentire (GB)
- Jockey: Michael Hills
- Trainer: Geoff Wragg (GB)
- Owner: Mollers Racing

The 1996 King George VI and Queen Elizabeth Stakes was a horse race held at Ascot Racecourse on Saturday 27 July 1996. It was the 46th running of the King George VI and Queen Elizabeth Stakes.

The winner was Moller Racing's Pentire, a four-year-old bay colt trained at Newmarket, Suffolk by Geoff Wragg and ridden by Michael Hills. Pentire's victory was the first in the race for Hills and the second for Wragg after Teenoso in 1984. Mollers Racing was a trust formed to manage the racing interests of Teenoso's owner Eric Moller after his death in 1988.

== The race ==
The race attracted a field of eight runners: seven from the United Kingdom, and one from Ireland. The favourite for the race was the three-year-old colt Shaamit who had won the Epsom Derby on his most recent appearance. The best of the other British runners appeared to be the Godolphin stables, Classic Cliche, winner of the St Leger Stakes and the Ascot Gold Cup and Pentire, who had been narrowly beaten by Lammtarra in the previous year's race before winning the Irish Champion Stakes. The Irish challenger was the four-year-old Oscar Schindler, the winner of the Hardwicke Stakes at Royal Ascot. The other runners were Strategic Choice (Irish St Leger, Gran Premio di Milano), Luso (Derby Italiano), Farasan and Annus Mirabilis, who was acting as a pacemaker. Shaamit headed the betting at odds of 2/1 ahead of Pentire (100/30), Classic Cliche (5/1) and Strategic Choice (7/1).

As expected, Annus Mirabilis went into the lead from the start and set a strong pace from Strategic Choice, Classic Cliche and Luso with Pentire in last place. On the turn into the straight, Classic Cliche moved up on the outside and took the lead approaching the last quarter mile but was soon challenged by Pentire on the outside and Shaamit on the rail. Pentire took the lead a furlong from the finish and won by an official margin of one and three-quarter lengths from Classic Cliche with haamit a neck away in third. There was a gap of ten lengths back to the fourth-placed Oscar Schindler who was followed home by Annus Mirabilis, Farasan, Luso and Strategic Choice.

== Race details ==
- Sponsor: De Beers
- Purse: £478,400; First prize: £294,600
- Surface: Turf
- Going: Good to Firm
- Distance: 12 furlongs
- Number of runners: 8
- Winner's time: 2:28.11

== Full result ==
Pos.	Marg.	Horse (bred)	Age	Jockey	Trainer (Country)	Odds
1		Pentire (GB)	4	Michael Hills	Geoff Wragg (GB)	100/30
2	1¾	Classic Cliche (IRE)	4	Mick Kinane	Saeed bin Suroor (GB)	5/1
3	1¼	Shaamit (IRE)	3	Pat Eddery	William Haggas (GB)	2/1 fav
4	10	Oscar Schindler (IRE)	4	Richard Hughes	Kevin Prendergast (IRE)	10/1
5	11	Annus Mirabilis (FR)	4	Richard Hills	Saeed bin Suroor (GB)	33/1
6	1¾	Farasan (IRE)	3	Ray Cochrane	Henry Cecil (GB)	11/1
7	1¾	Luso (GB)	4	John Reid	Clive Brittain (GB)	14/1
8	1¾	Strategic Choice (USA)	5	Richard Quinn	Paul Cole (GB)	7/1

- Abbreviations: nse = nose; nk = neck; shd = head; hd = head; dist = distance

== Winner's details ==
Further details of the winner, Pentire

- Sex: Colt
- Foaled: 12 April 1992
- Country: United Kingdom
- Sire: Be My Guest; Dam: Gull Nook (Mill Reef)
- Owner: Mollers Racing
- Breeder: Peter Wood, 3rd Earl of Halifax
