= Salsabil Stakes =

Flat horse race in Ireland

Salsabil Stakes
2026
Thundering On	Emmeleia	Bloom

Previous years
2025
Wemightakedlongway	Catalina Delcarpio	Island Hopping
2024
Ezeliya	Purple Lily	Everlasting
2023
Village Voice	Jackie Oh	Foniska
2022
Concert Hall	Magical Lagoon	Cairde Go Deo
2021
Rocky Sky	French Fusion	Sacred Rhyme

2020-2011
2020
Silence Please	One Voice	Raven's Cry
2019
Pink Dogwood	Encapsulation	Tarnawa
2018
Mary Tudor	Hazel Bay	Princess Yaiza
2017
Vociferous Marina	Pocketfullofdreams	Bengala
2016
Pretty Perfect	Glamorous Approach	Emergent
2015
Bocca Baciata	Pleascach	Diamondsandrubies
2014
Dazzling	Cristal Fashion	Terrific
2013
Alive Alive Oh	Magical Dream	Sleeping Beauty
2012
Kissed	Aaraas	Cleofila
2011
Siren's Song	Asheerah	Kirinda

2010-2003
2010
Akdarena	Unity	Dazzling Day
2009
Indiana Gal	Perfect Truth	Ashka
2008
Truly Mine	Allicansayis Wow	Queen of France
2007
Anna Pavlova	Bon Nuit	Tartouche
2006
Perfect Hedge	Sina Cova	Kushnarenkovo
2005
Allexina	Faint Heart	Showbiz
2004
All Too Beautiful	Queen Astrid	Imoya
2003
Crimphill	Canouan	Fenella's Link

The Salsabil Stakes is a Group 3 flat horse race in Ireland open to three-year-old thoroughbred fillies. It is run at Navan over a distance of 1 mile and 2 furlongs (2,012 metres), and it is scheduled to take place each year in April.

The race was first run in 2003. It is named in honor of Salsabil who won the 1000 Guineas, Oaks and Irish Derby in 1990. It was originally classed at Listed level and was upgraded to Group 3 level in 2024.

== Records ==
Leading jockey (5 wins):

- Fran Berry – Allexina (2005), Indiana Girl (2009), Siren's Song (2011), Alive Alive Oh (2013), Bocca Baciata (2015)

Leading trainer (6 wins):

- Aidan O'Brien - All Too Beautiful (2004), Kissed (2012), Dazzling (2014), Pretty Perfect (2016), Pink Dogwood (2019), Concert Hall (2022)

== Winners ==
Year	Winner	Jockey	Trainer	Time
2003	Crimphill	Niall McCullagh	Michael Grassick	2:19.70
2004	All Too Beautiful	Jamie Spencer	Aidan O'Brien	2:16.50
2005	Allexina	Fran Berry	John Oxx	2:24.10
2006	Perfect Hedge	Michael Kinane	John Oxx	2:13.90
2007	Anna Pavlova	Paul Hanagan	Richard Fahey	2:26.50
2008	Truly Mine	Pat Smullen	Dermot Weld	2:14.52
2009	Indiana Gal	Fran Berry	Patrick Martin	2:13.30
2010	Akdarena	D J Moran	Jim Bolger	2:05.61
2011	Siren's Song	Fran Berry	Jessica Harrington	2:09.44
2012	Kissed	Joseph O'Brien	Aidan O'Brien	2:17.78
2013	Alive Alive Oh	Fran Berry	Tommy Stack	2:13.40
2014	Dazzling	Joseph O'Brien	Aidan O'Brien	2:16.75
2015	Bocca Baciata	Fran Berry	Jessica Harrington	2:08.92
2016	Pretty Perfect	Colm O'Donoghue	Aidan O'Brien	2:20.47
2017	Vociferous Marina	Kevin Manning	Jim Bolger	2:05.30
2018	Mary Tudor	Billy Lee	Willie McCreery	2:18.50
2019	Pink Dogwood	Ryan Moore	Aidan O'Brien	2:15.31
2020	Silence Please (Note: The 2020 race was run in June due to the COVID-19 pandemic in the Republic of Ireland)	Tom Madden	Jessica Harrington	2:07.65
2021	Rocky Sky	Gary Halpin	Ross O'Sullivan	2:07.46
2022	Concert Hall	Ryan Moore	Aidan O'Brien	2:07.22
2023	Village Voice	Ronan Whelan	Jessica Harrington	2:23.89
2024	Ezeliya	Chris Hayes	Dermot Weld	2:12.27
2025	Wemightakedlongway	Dylan Browne McMonagle	Joseph O'Brien	2:15.25
2026	Thundering On	Joey Sheridan	Joseph O'Brien	2:06.86

== See also ==
- Horse racing in Ireland
- List of Irish flat horse races
