= Bosra Sham =

American-bred Thoroughbred racehorse (b. 1993)

- Sire: Woodman
- Grandsire: Mr. Prospector
- Dam: Korveya
- Damsire: Riverman
- Sex: Filly
- Foaled: 28 February 1993
- Country: United States
- Colour: Chestnut
- Breeder: Gerald Leigh
- Owner: Wafic Saïd
- Trainer: Henry Cecil
- Record: 10: 7-1-1
- Earnings: £588,484

Major wins
- Fillies' Mile (1995); Fred Darling Stakes (1996); 1,000 Guineas (1996); Champion Stakes (1996); Brigadier Gerard Stakes (1997); Prince of Wales's Stakes (1997).

Awards
- European Champion Three-Year Old Filly (1996)

Honours
- Timeform rating: 132
- Last updated on 12 April 2022

Bosra Sham (28 February 1993) is a retired American-bred Thoroughbred racehorse trained in England. In a career which lasted from August 1995 until August 1997, she ran ten times and won seven races. Bosra Sham won several important races including the Group One 1000 Guineas and the Champion Stakes in 1996, a year in which she was awarded the title of European Champion Three-Year Old Filly. She was one of the highest-rated fillies of modern times.

== Background ==
Bosra Sham, whose name is derived from the ancient Syrian city of Bosra or Busra ash-Sham, is a chestnut mare with a prominent white blaze and long white socks on her hindlegs. Bred in Kentucky by Gerald W Leigh, she was sired by the Mr. Prospector stallion Woodman out of the Riverman mare Korveya, making her a full sister to the European Champion Two-Year-Old Hector Protector and a half-sister to the French 2000 Guineas winner Shanghai. As a descendant of the broodmare Royal Statute, she was also closely related to Derby winner Lammtarra.

Her pedigree made her highly sought after. At the 1994 Tattersalls Houghton yearling auction, the Syrian businessman Wafic Saïd paid 530,000 guineas (the highest price in Europe that year) to secure her. The price was no guarantee of success: no top-priced yearling at the Houghton Sale had gone on to win a Classic since Sayajirao in 1947. The filly was sent into training with Henry Cecil at Newmarket.

== Racing career ==
=== 1995: two-year-old season ===
Bosra Sham won both of her races as a two-year-old in 1995. After "comfortably" winning a maiden race at Newbury in August, she was moved straight up to Group One class for the Fillies' Mile at Ascot. Despite her lack of experience, she was made odds-on favourite and won in "impressive" style, taking the lead a furlong from the finish and pulling clear to win by three and a half lengths. Her performance led to her being immediately named 4/1 favourite for the following year's 1,000 Guineas, with the Cheveley Park Stakes winner Blue Duster being seen as her only serious rival.

=== 1996: three-year-old season ===
In the winter and the early spring of 1996, Bosra Sham's form in training was the subject of encouraging reports and she attracted more support for the Guineas. She began her 1996 campaign with a six length win in the Fred Darling Stakes The performance resulted in her being made odds-on favourite for the Guineas, and being blamed for the lack of potential runners as trainers sought alternative races for their fillies. Shortly before the race she suffered a bruised foot which caused her odds to drift from 2/5 to 10/11 in the betting as she missed a planned training gallop. Bosra Sham in fact had very shallow, fragile feet which caused her problems throughout her career.

In the 1,000 Guineas she remained unbeaten, but was less impressive, having to be ridden hard to win by one and a half lengths from Matiya. After the race she received a "sweeping reception" which left Henry Cecil, her trainer visibly moved. Cecil then revealed that the injury had left the Bosra Sham's feet bruised and sore and that she had endured a "horrible time" in preparation. Her rider Pat Eddery explained that her injuries had hampered the filly's ability to gallop, saying that, "you haven't seen her at her best today".

The foot injury recurred soon afterwards and Bosra Sham was unable to race for almost five months. Returning in the Queen Elizabeth II Stakes she was matched against the 2,000 Guineas winner Mark of Esteem in a race which was expected to identify the best horse in Europe over one mile. Bosra Sham was sent into the lead in the straight, but was overtaken by Mark of Esteem and lost her unbeaten record by one and a quarter lengths. Mark of Esteem's defeat of Bosra Sham earned a Timeform rating of 137, making it one of the best performances ever recorded over one mile, but the quality of the race was somewhat overshadowed as it formed part of Frankie Dettori's achievement of winning all seven races on the day.

Bosra Sham's final race of the year was the Champion Stakes at Newmarket. A significant feature of the race was that her main rival was expected to be the five-year-old Halling, who represented Godolphin Racing. Not only was Henry Cecil involved in a close race for the trainers' championship with Godolphin's Saeed Bin Suroor, but he had also been involved in an "acrimonious" dispute with the organisation's owner Sheikh Mohammed who had removed his horses, including Mark of Esteem, from Cecil's stable. Halling started favourite and was sent into the lead three furlongs from the finish, but Bosra Sham "surged" past him a furlong out and pulled away to win by two and a half lengths. Her win was enthusiastically received by the crowd and Sue Montgomery, writing in the Independent, was effusive, calling the performance "magnificent... poetry in motion".

=== 1997: four-year-old season ===
Early plans to run her in the Dubai World Cup were abandoned and Bosra Sham's 1997 debut came in Brigadier Gerard Stakes. Starting at odds of 1/5, she won the race, but had to be ridden out to beat Predappio by half a length.

She was sent to Royal Ascot for the Prince of Wales's Stakes (then a Group Two race) in which she produced her best form, taking the lead two furlongs out and pulling away to win by eight lengths from Alhaarth in "very impressive" style. The performance was described by the Independent's Greg Wood as "breathtaking" and led Cecil to name her the best horse he had ever trained.

In her final two races she was beaten as odds-on favourite. In the Eclipse Stakes at Sandown in July she finished third, beaten just over a length, behind the Breeders' Cup Turf winner Pilsudski and the Derby winner Benny the Dip. Her rider Kieren Fallon was criticised after the filly was boxed in and unable to find a clear run in the closing stages, and he was replaced by Pat Eddery for her next race on the instructions of her owner. Fallon himself referred to the race as the "Bosra Shambles".

Bosra Sham's last race came a month later when she finished last of the four runners behind Singspiel in the International Stakes at York after reportedly losing a shoe during the race.

Bosra Sham's feet were continuing to cause serious difficulties, and her retirement was announced in September. Henry Cecil's comments on the occasion emphasised the filly's ability and attitude, as well as the frustration which arose from her chronic problems.

== Race record ==
Date	Race	Dist (f)	Course	Class	Prize (£K)	Odds	Runners	Placing	Margin	Time	Jockey	Trainer
11 August 1995	Sparsholt Maiden Fillies' Stakes	6	Newbury	M	4	4/5	22	1	3.5	1:13.87	Michael Kinane	Henry Cecil
24 September 1995	Fillies' Mile	8	Ascot	1	90	10/11	6	1	3.5	1:43.13	Pat Eddery	Henry Cecil
19 April 1996	Fred Darling Stakes	7	Newbury	3	20	2/9	9	1	6	1:33.46	Pat Eddery	Henry Cecil
5 May 1996	1,000 Guineas	8	Newmarket Rowley	1	100	10/11	13	1	1.5	1:37.75	Pat Eddery	Henry Cecil
28 September 1996	Queen Elizabeth II Stakes	8	Ascot	1	199	100/30	7	2	1.25	1:40.95	Pat Eddery	Henry Cecil
19 October 1996	Champion Stakes	10	Newmarket Rowley	1	174	9/4	6	1	2.5	2:03.71	Pat Eddery	Henry Cecil
27 May 1997	Brigadier Gerard Stakes	10	Sndown Park	3	18	1/5	6	1	0.5	2:07.37	Kieren Fallon	Henry Cecil
17 June 1997	Prince of Wales's Stakes	10	Ascot	2	67	4/11	6	1	8	2:04.16	Kieren Fallon	Henry Cecil
5 July 1997	Eclipse Stakes	10	Sandown Park	1	145	4/7	5	3	1.25	2:12.51	Kieren Fallon	Henry Cecil
19 August 1997	International Stakes	10.5	York	1	202	4/5	4	4	4.25	2:12.10	Pat Eddery	Henry Cecil

== Assessment ==
At two, Bosra Sham was rated the third-best filly in Europe, with a rating of 114 on the International Classification. Bosra Sham was named the best filly of her generation at three and was the highest-rated horse in Europe and North America over a mile and a quarter in the 1996 International Classification. She was also the top-rated older filly or mare in Europe at four, when she was given a peak rating of 133 in June 1997.

She was rated at 132 by Timeform.

In their book A Century of Champions, John Randall and Tony Morris rated Bosra Sham the tenth-best filly trained in Britain and Ireland in the 20th century and the best British filly of the 1990s.

The Listed EBF Bosra Sham Fillies Stakes has been run at Newmarket in her honour since 2003.

In 1999, Henry Cecil described her as "The best I've ever trained... and that includes the colts"

== Stud career ==
Retired at the end of 1997, Bosra Sham was bred to many leading stallions and produced several winners, but none of them top-class. Her best foal was probably Rosberg, by A.P. Indy, who won the Canadian Grade III Premier's Stakes at Hastings Park.

- 1999 SHAMI (GB) : Chesnut colt, foaled 30 January, by Rainbow Quest (USA) – won 2 races and £30,447; placed 3 times from 28 starts in Britain and Dubai 2002–2008
- 2000 BOSRA'S VALENTINE (USA) : Bay colt, foaled 14 February, by Sadler's Wells (USA) – won 3 races and placed 2nd once from 11 starts in France and Dubai 2003–2010
- 2001 ROSBERG (USA) : Brown colt, foaled 3 April, by A.P. Indy (USA) – won 5 races and £127,180, including G3 Premier's S, Hastings Park, Canada and placed twice from 15 starts in U.S.A., Dubai and Canada 2003–2008; at stud in Canada. Stud fee $3000. Died in 2014.
- 2006 TINGLING (USA) : Chesnut filly, foaled 1 January, by Storm Cat (USA) – placed second 3 times from all starts in Ireland 2008; dam of winners Lybica (IRE) (2010, by Galileo), Tingleo (IRE)(2012, by Galileo), standing as a mare at Norton Grove Stud, and Tinga (IRE)(2011, by Galileo)- Sold to Iran (Danial Jabbari & Hamid Khalili) through the bloodstock Agent, Federico Barberini. Standing at Daniel Stud as a broodmare.

== Pedigree ==
Pedigree of Bosra Sham (IRE), chestnut mare, 1993
Sire Woodman (USA) 1983	Mr. Prospector (USA); 1970	Raise a Native	Native Dancer
Sire Woodman (USA) 1983	Mr. Prospector (USA); 1970	Raise a Native	Raise You
Sire Woodman (USA) 1983	Mr. Prospector (USA); 1970	Gold Digger	Nashua
Sire Woodman (USA) 1983	Mr. Prospector (USA); 1970	Gold Digger	Sequence
Sire Woodman (USA) 1983	Playmate (USA); 1975	Buckpasser	Tom Fool
Sire Woodman (USA) 1983	Playmate (USA); 1975	Buckpasser	Busanda
Sire Woodman (USA) 1983	Playmate (USA); 1975	Intriguing	Swaps
Sire Woodman (USA) 1983	Playmate (USA); 1975	Intriguing	Glamour
Dam Korveya (USA) 1982	Riverman (USA); 1969	Never Bend	Nasrullah
Dam Korveya (USA) 1982	Riverman (USA); 1969	Never Bend	Lalun
Dam Korveya (USA) 1982	Riverman (USA); 1969	River Lady	Prince John
Dam Korveya (USA) 1982	Riverman (USA); 1969	River Lady	Nile Lily
Dam Korveya (USA) 1982	Konafa (CAN); 1973	Damascus	Sword Dancer
Dam Korveya (USA) 1982	Konafa (CAN); 1973	Damascus	Kerala
Dam Korveya (USA) 1982	Konafa (CAN); 1973	Royal Statute	Northern Dancer
Dam Korveya (USA) 1982	Konafa (CAN); 1973	Royal Statute	Queen's Statute (Family: 22-b)
