= Matiya (horse) =

Irish-bred Thoroughbred racehorse

- Sire: Alzao
- Grandsire: Lyphard
- Dam: Purchasepaperchase
- Damsire: Young Generation
- Sex: Mare
- Foaled: 7 April 1993
- Country: Ireland
- Colour: Bay
- Breeder: Barronstown Stud
- Owner: Hamdan Al Maktoum
- Trainer: Ben Hanbury
- Record: 9: 2-2-3
- Earnings: £185,001

Major wins
- Irish 1,000 Guineas (1996)

Matiya (foaled 7 April 1993) was an Irish-bred, British-trained Thoroughbred racehorse and broodmare. After winning on her racecourse debut she was beaten in her three remaining races as a two-year-old but showed very promising form when finishing third in the Fillies' Mile. In the following spring she finished second in the 1000 Guineas before recording her biggest success in the Irish 1,000 Guineas. She went on to finish third in the Prix de Diane but finished last in her two subsequent races and was retired from racing at the end of the year. She had limited success as a broodmare.

== Background ==
Matiya was a bay mare with a white star bred in Ireland by the County Wicklow-based Barronstown Stud. As a yearling she was acquired by Hamdan Al Maktoum for a reported 20,000 guineas and was sent into training with Ben Hanbury at the Diomed Stables at Newmarket, Suffolk.

She was sired by Alzao, a son of Lyphard who never won above Group Three level, but became a successful breeding stallion, with his progeny including Second Set, Shahtoush, Capricciosa, Pass the Peace and Alborada. Matiya's dam Purchasepaperchase never won a major race but was a high-class racemare who finished second in the Prix Saint-Alary as a three-year-old in 1985. She was a distant descendant of the British broodmare Spicebox (foaled 1923) who was the female-line ancestor of numerous major winners including Herbager, Detroit, Zabeel and Gildoran.

== Racing career ==
=== 1995: two-year-old season ===
Matiya began her racing career in a maiden race over seven furlongs in an evening meeting at Newmarket Racecourse on 21 July in which she was ridden by Richard Hills and started the 2/1 favourite. After pulling hard in the early stages she took the lead inside the final furlong and won by a length from the Paul Cole-trained Sibbertoft. A month later she was brought back in distance for a minor stakes race on good to firm ground at Pontefract Racecourse and finished third of the four runners behind Defined Feature. At Haydock Park on 2 September she was matched against male opposition and moved up in distance for the St Annes Stakes over one mile. She finished second of the five runners behind Beauchamp King, a colt who went on to win the Racing Post Trophy. On her final appearance of the season, Matiya was stepped up to the highest class for the Group One Fillies' Mile at Ascot Racecourse. Starting a 20/1 outsider she led for most of the way before being overtaken in the straight and finishing third behind Bosra Sham and Bint Shadayid.

=== 1996: three-year-old season ===
Matiya began her second season by starting a 25/1 outsider for the classic 1000 Guineas over Newmarket's Rowley Mile course on 5 May. After tracking the leaders, she stayed on well in the latter stages to finish second of the thirteen runners, one ad a half lengths behind the odds-on favourite Bosra Sham. Three weeks after her run at Newmarket Matiya was sent to the Curragh for the Irish 1,000 Guineas and started the 5/1 joint third choice in a field of twelve fillies. The Henry Cecil-trained Distant Oasis headed the betting from Bint Shadayid, while the other runners included Priory Belle (Moyglare Stud Stakes), Dance Design (Debutante Stakes), My Branch (Firth of Clyde Stakes), Tossup (Derrinstown Stud 1,000 Guineas Trial) and Sheraka (Leopardstown 1,000 Guineas Trial Stakes). Ridden by the 53-year-old Willie Carson Matiya took the lead at half way and kept on strongly in the closing stages to win by three lengths from Dance Design with My Branch taking third place. After the race Ben Hanbury said "Matiya is a fantastic filly and she has come on a lot since Newmarket. She was a fitter, harder and mentally happier than she was in the Newmarket Guineas. I deliberately did not run her before that because I have seen so many fillies ruined by the trials". Carson received a five-day suspension from the racecourse stewards on Saturday for wearing an unapproved type of helmet.

Carson was again in the saddle when Matiya was stepped up in distance and sent to France for the Prix de Diane over 2100 metres at Chantilly Racecourse on 9 June. After being hampered early in the race she recovered to take the lead 300 metres from the finish but was overtaken and beaten into third place behind Sil Sila and the Prix Marcel Boussac winner Miss Tahiti. In July she was dropped back to a mile for the Sussex Stakes at Goodwood Racecourse but made no impact as she finished last of the ten runners behind First Island. After a break of over two months Matiya ended her racing career with a run in the Prix de l'Opéra at Longchamp Racecourse in October. After racing in second place for most of the way she faded badly in the straight and finished tailed-off in last place.

== Breeding record ==
After her retirement from racing Matiya became a broodmare for Hamdan Al Maktoum's Shadwell Farm. Her foals have included:

- Rababah, a bay filly, foaled in 1998, sired by Woodman. Unraced. Dam of African Skies (Princess Margaret Stakes).
- Rakayeb, chestnut filly, 1999, by Gone West. Unplaced on only start.
- Aljazeera, filly, 2000, by Swain. Won one race.
- Nakheel, bay colt, 2003, by Sadler's Wells. Won two races including the Silver Tankard Stakes.
- Alsaabeqa, chestnut filly, 2004, by Sakhee
- Rihaab, filly, 2006, by Diesis
- Radjamil, filly, 2008, by Forestry. Third on her only start.
- Afweya, brown filly, 2010, by Jazil
- Aljaazya, filly, 2012, by Speightstown. Unraced.

== Pedigree ==
Pedigree of Matiya (IRE), bay mare, 1993
Sire Alzao (USA) 1980	Lyphard (USA); 1969	Northern Dancer	Nearctic
Sire Alzao (USA) 1980	Lyphard (USA); 1969	Northern Dancer	Natalma
Sire Alzao (USA) 1980	Lyphard (USA); 1969	Goofed	Court Martial
Sire Alzao (USA) 1980	Lyphard (USA); 1969	Goofed	Barra
Sire Alzao (USA) 1980	Lady Rebecca (GB); 1971	Sir Ivor	Sir Gaylord
Sire Alzao (USA) 1980	Lady Rebecca (GB); 1971	Sir Ivor	Attica
Sire Alzao (USA) 1980	Lady Rebecca (GB); 1971	Pocahontas	Roman
Sire Alzao (USA) 1980	Lady Rebecca (GB); 1971	Pocahontas	How
Dam Purchasepaperchase (GB) 1982	Young Generation (IRE); 1976	Balidar	Will Somers
Dam Purchasepaperchase (GB) 1982	Young Generation (IRE); 1976	Balidar	Violet Bank
Dam Purchasepaperchase (GB) 1982	Young Generation (IRE); 1976	Brig o' Doon	Shantung
Dam Purchasepaperchase (GB) 1982	Young Generation (IRE); 1976	Brig o' Doon	Tam o' Shanter
Dam Purchasepaperchase (GB) 1982	Tin Goddess (IRE); 1973	Petingo	Petition
Dam Purchasepaperchase (GB) 1982	Tin Goddess (IRE); 1973	Petingo	Alcazar
Dam Purchasepaperchase (GB) 1982	Tin Goddess (IRE); 1973	Daphne	Acropolis
Dam Purchasepaperchase (GB) 1982	Tin Goddess (IRE); 1973	Daphne	Donna (Family: 16-c)
