= Dubawi =

Irish-bred Thoroughbred racehorse and sire

- Racing silks of Godolphin
- Sire: Dubai Millennium
- Grandsire: Seeking The Gold
- Dam: Zomaradah
- Damsire: Deploy
- Sex: Stallion
- Foaled: 7 February 2002
- Country: Ireland
- Colour: Bay
- Breeder: Sheikh Mohammed
- Owner: Godolphin
- Trainer: Saeed bin Suroor
- Record: 8: 5-1-1
- Earnings: £699,341

Major wins
- Superlative Stakes (2004); National Stakes (2004); Irish 2,000 Guineas (2005); Prix Jacques Le Marois (2005); Timeform rating: 129
- Last updated on 22 July 2024

Dubawi (foaled 7 February 2002) is a retired Thoroughbred racehorse. He has proven himself a top-class sire.

== Background ==
Dubawi is a bay horse with no white markings bred in Ireland by Sheikh Mohammed's Darley Stud. He was one of the only crop of foals sired by Dubai Millennium, an outstanding racehorse. His dam, Zomaradah was a top class racemare who won the Oaks d'Italia, E. P. Taylor Stakes, Premio Lydia Tesio and the Royal Whip Stakes. As a descendant of the broodmare Sunbittern, Zomaradah, who also produced the Lancashire Oaks winner Emirates Queen, was closely related to In the Wings, High-Rise and Virginia Waters. The colt raced in the blue colours of Godolphin and was trained by Saeed bin Suroor. He was ridden in all but one of his races by Frankie Dettori.

== Racing career ==
Dubawi was undefeated as a two-year-old in 2004. He won a maiden race at Goodwood Racecourse in June, the Group Three Superlative Stakes at Newmarket in July and the Group One National Stakes at the Curragh in September.

In the following year he started favourite for the 2000 Guineas at Newmarket but finished fifth behind Footstepsinthesand. He defeated Oratorio in the Irish 2000 Guineas and then moved up in distance to finish third to Motivator in The Derby. He returned to one mile to win the Prix Jacques Le Marois at Deauville Racecourse in August and ended his career by finishing second to Starcraft in the Queen Elizabeth II Stakes at Ascot a month later.

== Stud record ==
Dubawi stands as a breeding stallion at his owner's Dalham Hall Stud at a fee of £350,000 for the 2023 season.

=== Notable stock ===
c = colt, f = filly, g = gelding

Foaled	Name	Sex	Major wins
2007	Dubawi Heights	f	Gamely Stakes, Yellow Ribbon Stakes
2007	Happy Archer	f	Garden Province Stakes, The Durban Thekwini Stakes
2007	Lucky Nine	g	Hong Kong Sprint, KrisFlyer International Sprint (twice)
2007	Makfi	c	2000 Guineas Stakes, Prix Jacques Le Marois
2007	Monterosso	c	Dubai World Cup
2007	Poet's Voice	c	Queen Elizabeth II Stakes
2007	Prince Bishop	c	Al Maktoum Challenge, Round 3, Dubai World Cup
2007	Secret Admirer	f	Flight Stakes, Epsom Handicap
2007	Tiger Tees	c	The Galaxy
2008	Al Kazeem	c	Tattersalls Gold Cup (twice), Prince of Wales's Stakes, Eclipse Stakes
2008	Hunter's Light	c	Premio Roma, Al Maktoum Challenge, Round 3, Jebel Hatta
2008	Red Dubawi	c	Premio Vittorio di Capua
2008	Waldpark	c	Deutsches Derby
2009	Akeed Mofeed	c	Hong Kong Cup
2009	Shamal Wind	f	Oakleigh Plate
2009	Sheikhzayedroad	g	Northern Dancer Turf Stakes
2010	Srikandi	f	Stradbroke Handicap, Tattersall's Tiara
2010	Willow Magic	c	The South African Nursery
2011	Night of Thunder	c	2000 Guineas Stakes, Lockinge Stakes
2011	Postponed	c	King George VI & Q. Elizabeth Stakes, Dubai Sheema Classic, International Stakes
2012	Almanaar	c	Gulfstream Park Turf Handicap
2012	Arabian Queen	f	International Stakes
2012	Bateel	f	Prix Vermeille
2012	Erupt	c	Grand Prix de Paris
2012	Journey	f	British Champions Fillies' and Mares' Stakes
2012	Mubtaahij	c	Awesome Again Stakes
2012	New Bay	c	Prix du Jockey Club
2012	North America	g	Al Maktoum Challenge, Round 3
2013	Left Hand	f	Prix Vermeille
2013	Nezwaah	f	Pretty Polly Stakes
2013	Zarak	c	Grand Prix de Saint-Cloud
2014	Benbatl	c	Dubai Turf, Bayerisches Zuchtrennen, Ladbrokes Stakes
2014	Coronet	f	Grand Prix de Saint-Cloud, Prix Jean Romanet
2014	Kitesurf	f	Prix Vermeille
2014	Sobetsu	f	Prix Saint-Alary
2014	Wuheida	f	Prix Marcel Boussac, Breeders' Cup Filly & Mare Turf
2015	Ghaiyyath	c	Grosser Preis von Baden, Coronation Cup, Eclipse Stakes, International Stakes
2015	Old Persian	c	Dubai Sheema Classic, Northern Dancer Turf Stakes
2015	The Revenant	g	Queen Elizabeth II Stakes
2015	Wild Illusion	f	Prix Marcel Boussac, Nassau Stakes, Prix de l'Opéra
2016	Quorto	c	Vincent O'Brien National Stakes
2016	Too Darn Hot	c	Dewhurst Stakes, Prix Jean Prat, Sussex Stakes
2016	Lord North	g	Prince of Wales's Stakes, Dubai Turf (thrice)
2016	Space Blues	c	Prix Maurice de Gheest, Prix de la Forêt, Breeders' Cup Mile
2018	Albahr	c	Summer Stakes
2018	Creative Force	g	British Champions Sprint Stakes
2018	In Italian	f	Diana Stakes, First Lady Stakes, Jenny Wiley Stakes, Just A Game Stakes
2018	Master of The Seas	c	Woodbine Mile, Breeders' Cup Mile, Maker's Mark Mile
2018	Naval Crown	c	Platinum Jubilee Stakes
2018	Rebel's Romance	c	Grosser Preis von Berlin (twice), Preis von Europa (twice), Breeders' Cup Turf (twice), Dubai Sheema Classic, Hong Kong Champions & Chater Cup, Joe Hirsch Turf Classic Stakes
2018	Yibir	g	Breeders' Cup Turf
2019	Al Husn	f	Nassau Stakes
2019	Coroebus	c	2000 Guineas Stakes, St James's Palace Stakes
2019	Eldar Eldarov	c	St Leger Stakes, Irish St. Leger
2019	Modern Games	c	Breeders' Cup Juvenile Turf, Poule d'Essai des Poulains, Woodbine Mile, Breeders' Cup Mile, Lockinge Stakes
2020	Silawi	g	Canadian International Stakes
2021	Ancient Wisdom	c	Futurity Trophy
2021	Arabian Crown	g	Canadian International Stakes
2021	God's Window	g	Epsom Handicap
2021	Henry Longfellow	c	Vincent O'Brien National Stakes
2021	Notable Speech	c	2000 Guineas Stakes, Sussex Stakes, Woodbine Mile (twice), Breeders' Cup Mile, Lockinge Stakes, City of York Stakes
2021	Ezeliya	f	Epsom Oaks
2022	Delacroix	c	Eclipse Stakes, Irish Champion Stakes

==== National Hunt ====
Dubawi sired Dodging Bullets, a top class 2 mile chaser who won the Grade I Tingle Creek Chase, Grade I Clarence House Chase and the Grade I Queen Mother Champion Chase at the Cheltenham Festival, winning all three Grade Ones in the 2014–2015 Great Britain National Hunt Season. Dodging Bullets was bred by acclaimed flat jockey Frankie Dettori, having originally been bred as an Epsom Derby prospect. Dubawi's first Grade I success in the National Hunt sphere came when Hisaabaat won the Champion Four Year Old Hurdle at the 2012 Punchestown Festival.

== Pedigree ==
Pedigree of Dubawi (IRE), bay horse, 2002
Sire Dubai Millennium (GB) 1996	Seeking the Gold (USA); 1985	Mr. Prospector	Raise a Native
Sire Dubai Millennium (GB) 1996	Seeking the Gold (USA); 1985	Mr. Prospector	Gold Digger
Sire Dubai Millennium (GB) 1996	Seeking the Gold (USA); 1985	Con Game	Buckpasser
Sire Dubai Millennium (GB) 1996	Seeking the Gold (USA); 1985	Con Game	Broadway
Sire Dubai Millennium (GB) 1996	Colorado Dancer (IRE); 1986	Shareef Dancer	Northern Dancer
Sire Dubai Millennium (GB) 1996	Colorado Dancer (IRE); 1986	Shareef Dancer	Sweet Alliance
Sire Dubai Millennium (GB) 1996	Colorado Dancer (IRE); 1986	Fall Aspen	Pretense
Sire Dubai Millennium (GB) 1996	Colorado Dancer (IRE); 1986	Fall Aspen	Change Water
Dam Zomaradah (GB) 1995	Deploy (GB); 1987	Shirley Heights	Mill Reef
Dam Zomaradah (GB) 1995	Deploy (GB); 1987	Shirley Heights	Hardiemma
Dam Zomaradah (GB) 1995	Deploy (GB); 1987	Slightly Dangerous	Roberto
Dam Zomaradah (GB) 1995	Deploy (GB); 1987	Slightly Dangerous	Where You Lead
Dam Zomaradah (GB) 1995	Jawaher (IRE); 1989	Dancing Brave	Lyphard
Dam Zomaradah (GB) 1995	Jawaher (IRE); 1989	Dancing Brave	Navajo Princes
Dam Zomaradah (GB) 1995	Jawaher (IRE); 1989	High Tern	High Line
Dam Zomaradah (GB) 1995	Jawaher (IRE); 1989	High Tern	Sunbittern (Family 9-e)
