= Enzeli (horse) =

Irish-bred Thoroughbred racehorse

- Sire: Kahyasi
- Grandsire: Ile de Bourbon
- Dam: Ebaziya
- Damsire: Darshaan
- Sex: Stallion
- Foaled: 5 April 1995
- Country: Ireland
- Breeder: The Aga Khan's Studs (former)
- Owner: Aga Khan (former)
- Trainer: John Oxx (former); Myles Plumb
- Record: 15: 6-1-1
- Earnings: £192,864

Major wins
- Leopardstown November Handicap (1998); Saval Beg Stakes (1999); Ascot Gold Cup (1999); Doncaster Cup (2000)

Enzeli (foaled 5 April 1995) is a retired Irish-bred Thoroughbred racehorse and stallion. He won the Ascot Gold Cup in 1999.

== Background ==
Enzeli was bred at the Aga Khan's Studs and foaled on 5 April 1995. He was sired by Kahyasi. Enzeli's dam is Ebaziya, by Darshaan. Enzeli is Ebaziya's second foal. His half-sister is Estimate, winner of the 2013 Gold Cup for Queen Elizabeth II. Enzeli has a lean and lengthy appearance.

Enzeli was trained by John Oxx. He was sold for nearly 200.000 pounds to Australian businesspeople Kerry Packer and Lloyd Williams in 2000. Then he was trained by Myles Plumb.

== Racing career ==
At 3 years Enzeli won the Leopardstown November Handicap in 1998. He also won the Saval Beg Stakes and the Gold Cup in 1999. At the Gold Cup he was ridden by Johnny Murtagh and won the race with time of 4:18.85, being Ireland's first winner of the cup since 1969. At 5 years Enzeli won the Doncaster Cup again with Murtagh. In 2000, he took part in the Melbourne Cup.

== Assessment ==
In 1999, Enzeli was rated as one of the top-rated stayers in Europe together with Kayf Tara.

== Pedigree ==
Pedigree of Enzeli (IRE), bay horse 1995
Sire Kahyasi (IRE) 1985	Ile de Bourbon (USA); 1975	Nijinsky	Northern Dancer
Sire Kahyasi (IRE) 1985	Ile de Bourbon (USA); 1975	Nijinsky	Flaming Page
Sire Kahyasi (IRE) 1985	Ile de Bourbon (USA); 1975	Roseliere	Misti
Sire Kahyasi (IRE) 1985	Ile de Bourbon (USA); 1975	Roseliere	Peace Rose
Sire Kahyasi (IRE) 1985	Kadissya (USA); 1979	Blushing Groom	Red God
Sire Kahyasi (IRE) 1985	Kadissya (USA); 1979	Blushing Groom	Runaway Bride
Sire Kahyasi (IRE) 1985	Kadissya (USA); 1979	Kalkeem	Sheshoon
Sire Kahyasi (IRE) 1985	Kadissya (USA); 1979	Kalkeem	Gioia
Dam Ebaziya (IRE) 1989	Darshaan (GB); 1981	Shirley Heights	Mill Reef
Dam Ebaziya (IRE) 1989	Darshaan (GB); 1981	Shirley Heights	Hardiemma
Dam Ebaziya (IRE) 1989	Darshaan (GB); 1981	Delsy	Abdos
Dam Ebaziya (IRE) 1989	Darshaan (GB); 1981	Delsy	Kelty
Dam Ebaziya (IRE) 1989	Ezana (IRE); 1983	Ela-Mana-Mou	Pitcairn
Dam Ebaziya (IRE) 1989	Ezana (IRE); 1983	Ela-Mana-Mou	Rose Bertin
Dam Ebaziya (IRE) 1989	Ezana (IRE); 1983	Evisa	Dan Cupid
Dam Ebaziya (IRE) 1989	Ezana (IRE); 1983	Evisa	Albanilla
