= Edabiya =

Irish-bred Thoroughbred racehorse

- Sire: Rainbow Quest
- Grandsire: Blushing Groom
- Dam: Ebaziya
- Damsire: Darshaan
- Sex: Mare
- Foaled: 8 April 1996
- Country: Ireland
- Colour: Chestnut
- Breeder: The Aga Khan's Studs
- Owner: Aga Khan
- Trainer: John Oxx
- Record: 4: 2-0-1
- Earnings: £107,139

Major wins
- Debutante Stakes (1998); Moyglare Stud stakes (1998)

Edabiya (foaled 8 April 1996) is a retired Irish-trained thoroughbred Group 1 winner racehorse.

== Background ==
Edabiya, a chestnut horse, was foaled on 8 April 1996. She is the third foal of Ebaziya. Her sire is Rainbow Quest.

She is owned by Aga Khan and bred at his stud in Ireland. She was trained by John Oxx.

== Racing career ==
Edabiya won the Debutante Stakes, a Listed race, at Leopardstown in her first season in August 1998. She also won the Moyglare Stud stakes in September 1998. Her victory was the Aga Khan's and Johnny Murtagh's first Moyglare triumph. She was ridden by Murtagh in all four races she run.
