= Darshaan =

British-bred Thoroughbred racehorse

- Racing silks of Aga Khan
- Sire: Shirley Heights
- Grandsire: Mill Reef
- Dam: Delsy
- Damsire: Abdos
- Sex: Stallion
- Foaled: 1981
- Country: Great Britain
- Colour: Bay
- Breeder: Aga Khan IV
- Owner: Aga Khan IV
- Trainer: Alain de Royer-Dupré
- Record: 8: 5–0-1
- Earnings: €281.573

Major wins
- Critérium de Saint-Cloud (1983); Prix Hocquart (1984); Prix Greffulhe (1984); Prix du Jockey Club (1984)

Awards
- Top-rated French-trained three-year-old (1984); Leading broodmare sire in Britain & Ireland (2002, 2013); Leading sire in France (2003); French Champions Series Hall of Fame (2025)

Honours
- Prix Darshaan

Darshaan (18 April 1981 – 21 May 2001) was a British-bred, French-trained Thoroughbred racehorse and a Champion sire and broodmare sire.

Trained by Alain de Royer-Dupré, Darshaan was ridden by Yves Saint-Martin in all his races. As a two-year-old in 1983, he won the Group 1 Critérium de Saint-Cloud, setting a long-standing 2,000-meter record of 2:07.40, which went unbeaten for over twenty years until 2010. At age three, Darshaan won the Prix Hocquart, Prix Greffulhe, and the French Classic, the Prix du Jockey Club. In the International Classification for 1984, he was the highest-rated, French-trained three-year-old, and the third highest-rated three-year-old in Europe behind El Gran Senor and Chief Singer.

== Background ==
Darshaan was a brown horse bred by his owner the Aga Khan IV. He was sired by the British stallion Shirley Heights, winner of the 1978 Epsom Derby and the last Epsom Derby winner to be both the son of a previous winner, Mill Reef (1971), and the sire of a subsequent winner, Slip Anchor (1985). Darshaan's dam Delsy, was a daughter of the 1961 Grand Critérium winner, Abdos. She also produced Darara who won the Prix Vermeille and became a very successful broodmare.

== Racing career ==
=== 1983: Two-year-old season ===
On September 18 at Longchamp, Darshaan placed last in his maiden at the Prix de Villebon in a 5 horse field. But afterwards, on November 8, he won the Prix As d'Atout at Saint-Cloud by six lengths. Just two weeks later, on November 21, he won the Critérium de Saint-Cloud by three lengths over Grand Orient. His winning time of 2:07.40 for the 2,000-meter race set a record that stood for over two decades, lasting into 2010.

=== 1984: Three-year-old season ===
Into his three-year-old season on April 8, Darshaan would win the Prix Greffulhe by five lengths against the three other runners Green Paradise, Long Mick, and Acamont. He followed this on May 6 with a victory in the Prix Hocquart, defeating Xtol, the same horse who had finished ahead of him in his debut at the Villebon in 4th place. Into the Prix du Jockey Club, he faced a field featuring Sadler's Wells, Rainbow Quest, Long Mick, Bob Back, and Head for Heights. In the final stretch, Darshaan pulled ahead of Sadler's Wells to win by one and a half lengths, while Rainbow Quest followed a half-length behind in third. For his next start, Darshaan traveled outside of France to contest the King George VI & Queen Elizabeth Stakes at Ascot for the first time. The field included Sadler's Wells, Sun Princess, Jupiter Island, Dahard, and the previous year's winner, Time Charter. Unfortunately, Darshaan lost significant footing in the final stretch and faded to a ninth-place finish far behind the winner Teenoso. Darshaan made his final career start in the Prix Niel, where he faced Long Mick again. After finishing third, Darshaan was officially retired to stud.

In 2025, Darshaan was inducted into the French Champions Series Hall of Fame.

== Champion sire ==
Darshaan was an outstanding sire who stood at stud at the Aga Khan's Gilltown Stud farm, in County Kildare, Ireland. In 1999, he was described as the foremost active broodmare sire in Europe. His 2000 fee was Irpounds 50,000. The leading sire in France in 2003, among his progeny were:

- Hellenic (b. 1987) – won G1 Yorkshire Oaks
- Kotashaan (b. 1988) – winner of five Group 1 races in the United States including the Breeders' Cup Turf and San Juan Capistrano Handicap;
- Key Change (b. 1993) – won G1 Yorkshire Oaks;
- Mark of Esteem (b. 1993) – won the British Classic 2,000 Guineas Stakes, and G1 Queen Elizabeth II Stakes;
- Mutamam (b. 1995) – won G1 Canadian International;
- Cerulean Sky (b. 1996) – won G1 Prix Saint-Alary;
- Dilshaan (b. 1998) – won G1 Racing Post Trophy;
- Olden Times (b. 1998) – won G1 Prix Jean Prat;
- Dalakhani (b. 2000) – the 2003 European Horse of the Year. Wins included the Prix du Jockey Club and the Prix de l'Arc de Triomphe;
- Mezzo Soprano (b. 2000) – won G1 Prix Vermeille;
- Necklace (b. 2001) – won G1 Moyglare Stud Stakes.

== Champion broodmare sire ==
Darshaan's daughters made him the leading broodmare sire in Great Britain & Ireland in 2002. He was the damsire of Group 1 winners:

- Ebadiyla (b. 1994) – winner of the 1997 Prix Royal-Oak and Irish Oaks;
- Zainta (b. 1995), winner of the French Classic, Prix de Diane (1998);
- Enzeli (b. 1995), winner of the 1999 Ascot Gold Cup;
- Sendawar (b. 1996), winner of the 1999 Poule d'Essai des Poulains;
- Edabiya (b. 1996), won the 1998 Moyglare Stud Stakes;
- Marienbard (b. 1997) – won Prix de l'Arc de Triomphe;
- High Chaparral (b. 1999) – won Epsom Derby (2002), Irish Derby Stakes (2002), Breeders' Cup Turf (2002, 2003);
- Islington (b. 1999) – won Nassau Stakes (2002), Yorkshire Oaks (2002, 2002), Breeders' Cup Filly & Mare Turf (2003)
- Alexander Goldrun (b.2001) – won Prix de l'Opéra (2004), Hong Kong Cup (2004), Pretty Polly Stakes (2004, 2005), Nassau Stakes (2005)
- Darsi (b. 2003), winner of the 2006 Prix du Jockey Club;
- Sarafina (b. 2007), winner of 2011 Grand Prix de Saint-Cloud, 2010 Prix de Diane, 2010 Prix Saint-Alary;
- Al Kazeem (b. 2008), winner of the 2013 Prince of Wales's Stakes;
- Estimate (b. 2009), winner of the 2013 Ascot Gold Cup;
- Ridasiyna (b. 2009), winner of the 2012 Prix de l'Opéra Longines

In 2000, Darshaan underwent an emergency operation for colic. At age twenty, he died at Gilltown Stud on 21 May 2001.

== Pedigree ==
Pedigree of Darshaan
Sire Shirley Heights	Mill Reef	Never Bend	Nasrullah
Sire Shirley Heights	Mill Reef	Never Bend	Lalun
Sire Shirley Heights	Mill Reef	Milan Mill	Princequillo
Sire Shirley Heights	Mill Reef	Milan Mill	Virginia Water
Sire Shirley Heights	Hardiemma	Hardicanute	Hard Ridden
Sire Shirley Heights	Hardiemma	Hardicanute	Harvest Maid
Sire Shirley Heights	Hardiemma	Grand Cross	Grandmaster
Sire Shirley Heights	Hardiemma	Grand Cross	Blue Cross
Dam Delsy	Abdos	Arbar	Djebel
Dam Delsy	Abdos	Arbar	Astronomie
Dam Delsy	Abdos	Pretty Lady	Umidwar
Dam Delsy	Abdos	Pretty Lady	La Moqueuse
Dam Delsy	Kelty	Venture	Relic
Dam Delsy	Kelty	Venture	Rose O'Lynn
Dam Delsy	Kelty	Marilla	Marsyas
Dam Delsy	Kelty	Marilla	Albanilla (Family 13-c)
