= Ballysax Stakes =

Flat horse race in Ireland

- Class: Group 3
- Location: Leopardstown; County Dublin, Ireland
- Race type: Flat / Thoroughbred
- Website: Leopardstown

Race information
- Distance: 1m 2f (2,012 metres)
- Surface: Turf
- Track: Left-handed
- Qualification: Three-year-olds
- Weight: 9 st 5 lb Allowances; 3 lb for fillies Penalties; 5 lb for G1 / G2 winners 3 lb for G3 winners
- Purse: €50,000 (2021); 1st: €29,500

Ballysax Stakes
2026
Christmas Day	Endorsement	A Boy Named Susie

Previous years
2025
Delacroix	Lambourn	Tiberius Thunder
2024
Dallas Star	The Euphrates	Illinois
2023
White Birch	Up And Under	Alexandroupolis
2022
Piz Badile	Buckaroo	Duke De Sessa
2021
Bolshoi Ballet	Flying Visit	Taipan

2020-2011
2020
Nobel Prize	Indicative Vote	Dalvey
2018
Nelson	Delano Roosevelt	The Pentagon
2017
Rekindling	Douglas Macarthur	Yucatan
2016
Harzand	Idaho	Beacon Rock
2015
Success Days	Zafilani	John F Kennedy
2014
Fascinating Rock	Answered	All Set To Go
2013
Battle Of Marengo	Sugar Boy	Imperial Concorde
2012
Light Heavy	Call To Battle	Tower Rock
2011
Banimpire	Regent Street	Recital

2010-2001
2010
Puncher Clynch	At First Sight	Mikhail Glinka
2009
Fame And Glory	Fergus Mciver	Mourayan
2008
Moiqen	Hebridean	Unwritten Rule
2007
Mores Wells	Ferneley	Macarthur
2006
Rhythm'n Roots	Golden Arrow	Altius
2005
Bobs Pride	Mister Hight	Clash Of The Ash
2004
Yeats	Dabiroun	Lord Admiral
2003
Balestrini	Alamshar	Alberto Giacometti
2002
High Chaparral	Twentytwoandchange	Rahn
2001
Galileo	Milan	Vinnie Roe

2000-1991
2000
Grand Finale	Sinndar	Lammas
1999
Cupid	Royal Rebel	Port Bayou
1998
Aislo	Risk Material	Make No Mistake
1997
Casey Tibbs	Zafarabad	Caiseal Ros
1996
Key Change	Harghar	Peace Offering
1995
Humbel	Zabadi	Rawy
1994
Cajarian	Lake Kariba	City Nights
1993
Shandon Lake	Danse Royale	Sinissipi
1992
Ebaziya	Reported	Gallardini
1991
Jet Ski Lady	Classic Minstrel	Legal Profession

1990-1988
1990
Cheering News	Boarding School	Parting Moment
1989
Upward Trend	Just A Millionaire	Beyond The Lake
1988
Saxon Cottage	Safety Catch	Esprit D'Etoile

The Ballysax Stakes is a Group 3 flat horse race in Ireland open to three-year-old thoroughbreds. It is run over a distance of 1 mile and 2 furlongs (2,012 metres) at Leopardstown in April.

== History ==
The event was formerly held at the Curragh, and it used to be classed at Listed level. It was transferred to Leopardstown in 1993, and promoted to Group 3 status in 2003. The 2014 running was held at Navan as the normal Leopardstown fixture was judged to be too early in the season to serve as a trial race for the European classics.

The Ballysax Stakes is currently run in memory of Patrick W. McGrath (died 2001). McGrath served as chairman of the Racing Board (a precursor of Horse Racing Ireland), which purchased Leopardstown Racecourse in 1967. The race serves as trial race for various European classics and the most recent winner to go on to a classic victory was Christmas Day, winner of the Epsom Derby in 2026.

== Records ==
Leading jockey since 1986 (6 wins):

- Michael Kinane – Cheering News (1990), Humbel (1995), Casey Tibbs (1997), Cupid (1999), Galileo (2001), High Chaparral (2002)

Leading trainer since 1986 (13 wins):

- Aidan O'Brien – Cupid (1999), Galileo (2001), High Chaparral (2002), Balestrini (2003), Yeats (2004), Fame and Glory (2009), Battle of Marengo (2013), Nelson (2018), Broome (2019), Nobel Prize (2020), Bolshoi Ballet (2021), Delacroix (2025), Christmas Day (2026)

== Winners since 1986 ==
Year	Winner	Jockey	Trainer	Time
1986	Imperial Falcon	Pat Eddery	Vincent O'Brien	2:18.30
1987	Ancient Times	Cash Asmussen	Vincent O'Brien	2:10.80
1988	Saxon Cottage	Ron Quinton	John Oxx	2:16.40
1989	Upward Trend	Christy Roche	Jim Bolger	2:19.10
1990	Cheering News	Michael Kinane	Dermot Weld	2:08.60
1991	Jet Ski Lady	Christy Roche	Jim Bolger	2:11.90
1992	Ebaziya	Johnny Murtagh	John Oxx	2:21.50
1993	Shandon Lake	Kevin Manning	Jim Bolger	2:12.20
1994	Cajarian	Johnny Murtagh	John Oxx	2:12.30
1995	Humbel	Michael Kinane	Dermot Weld	2:13.80
1996	Key Change	Dermot Hogan	John Oxx	2:14.20
1997	Casey Tibbs	Michael Kinane	Dermot Weld	2:06.40
1998	Aislo	Fran Berry	Declan Gillespie	2:24.20
1999	Cupid	Michael Kinane	Aidan O'Brien	2:07.50
2000	Grand Finale	Pat Smullen	Dermot Weld	2:19.70
2001	Galileo	Michael Kinane	Aidan O'Brien	2:20.10
2002	High Chaparral	Michael Kinane	Aidan O'Brien	2:05.90
2003	Balestrini	Tom Queally	Aidan O'Brien	2:05.90
2004	Yeats	Jamie Spencer	Aidan O'Brien	2:23.40
2005	Bobs Pride	Pat Smullen	Dermot Weld	2:18.50
2006	Rhythm'n Roots	Kevin Manning	Jim Bolger	2:05.90
2007	Mores Wells	Declan McDonogh	Kevin Prendergast	2:05.50
2008	Moiqen	Declan McDonogh	Kevin Prendergast	2:13.66
2009	Fame and Glory	Johnny Murtagh	Aidan O'Brien	2:07.49
2010	Puncher Clynch	Kevin Manning	Jim Bolger	2:08.16
2011	Banimpire	Kevin Manning	Jim Bolger	2:04.73
2012	Light Heavy	Kevin Manning	Jim Bolger	2:08.04
2013	Battle of Marengo	Joseph O'Brien	Aidan O'Brien	2:16.58
2014	Fascinating Rock (Note: The 2014 running took place at Navan)	Pat Smullen	Dermot Weld	2:16.89
2015	Success Days	Shane Foley	Ken Condon	2:23.87
2016	Harzand	Pat Smullen	Dermot Weld	2:19.11
2017	Rekindling	Wayne Lordan	Joseph O'Brien	2:08.88
2018	Nelson	Donnacha O'Brien	Aidan O'Brien	2:26.58
2019	Broome	Ryan Moore	Aidan O'Brien	2:12.61
2020	Nobel Prize (Note: The 2020 race was run at Dundalk in July due to the COVID-19 pandemic in the Republic of Ireland)	Killian Hennessy	Aidan O'Brien	2:16.91
2021	Bolshoi Ballet	Ryan Moore	Aidan O'Brien	2:11.61
2022	Piz Badile	Gavin Ryan	Donnacha O'Brien	2:09.80
2023	White Birch	Shane Foley	JJ Murphy	2:19.95
2024	Dallas Star	Seamie Heffernan	Adrian Murray	2:23.39
2025	Delacroix	Ryan Moore	Aidan O'Brien	2:06.15
2026	Christmas Day	Wayne Lordan	Aidan O'Brien	2:12.76

== See also ==
- Horse racing in Ireland
- List of Irish flat horse races
