= Eurobird (horse) =

Irish-bred Thoroughbred racehorse

- Sire: Ela-Mana-Mou
- Grandsire: Pitcairn
- Dam: Irish Bird
- Damsire: Sea Bird
- Sex: Mare
- Foaled: 11 February 1984
- Country: Ireland
- Colour: Chestnut
- Breeder: Mrs S Rogers
- Owner: Gerald Jennings
- Trainer: John Oxx
- Record: 14: 4-3-3

Major wins
- Kinderhill Oaks Trial (1987); Blandford Stakes (1987); Irish St. Leger (1987)

Awards
- Top-rated European filly 14f+ (1987); Timeform rating 118 (1987)

Eurobird (11 February 1984 – after 2005) was an Irish Thoroughbred racehorse and broodmare. A specialist stayer who was well-suited by soft or heavy ground, she was the third Classic race winner produced by the broodmare Irish Bird. As a three-year-old in 1987 she made steady improvement, winning the Kinderhill Oaks Trial, Blandford Stakes and Irish St. Leger by wide margins as well as finishing third in the Irish Oaks. At the end of the year she was rated the best filly in Europe over fourteen furlongs and further. She failed to win as a four-year-old but ran several good races in defeat. She later had considerable success as a broodmare, being the dam of at least ten winners.

== Background ==
Eurobird was a "leggy" chestnut mare with a broad white blaze and a long white sock on her left foreleg bred in Ireland by Mrs S Rogers. During her racing career he was owned by Gerald Jennings and trained in Ireland by John Oxx.

She was sired by Ela-Mana-Mou an outstanding middle distance performer whose wins included the Eclipse Stakes and the King George VI and Queen Elizabeth Stakes in 1980. His other progeny included Double Trigger, Snurge, Emmson and Almaarad. Eurobird's dam Irish Bird was a half-sister of Irish Ball, a colt who finished third in the Epsom Derby before winning the Irish Derby in 1971. Before foaling Eurobird, Irish Bird had produced two outstanding middle distance performers in Bikala and Assert.

== Racing career ==
=== 1987: three-year-old season ===
Eurobird was unplaced on her only start as a two-year-old and finished second over ten furlongs on her three-year-old debut. She was then stepped up in distance for the Listed Kinderhill Oaks Trial at Phoenix Park Racecourse in June and won by six lengths from Taking Steps, a filly who had finished third in the Irish 1,000 Guineas. Later that month she recorded another six-length win in a minor event over one and a half miles at Leopardstown Racecourse. On 11 July the filly was elevated sharply in class for the Group 1 Irish Oaks at the Curragh and started the 7/1 third favourite, making her the best-fancied of the Irish-trained contingent. Ridden by the American jockey Cash Asmussen she finished third behind the British fillies Unite and Bourbon Girl. After a two-month break she was sent to England in August for the Yorkshire Oaks and finished fifth behind Bint Pasha: it was reported that she had been in season at the time of the race. In September she finished second to the Lancashire Oaks winner Three Tails in the Meld Stakes and then returned to her best to record a six length win over the four-year-old Too Phar in the Blandford Stakes at the Curragh.

The Irish St. Leger, run on heavy ground at the Curragh on 11 October, saw Eurobird, with Asmussen in the saddle, start the 9/4 second choice in the betting behind the British-trained four-year-old Moon Madness. The other six runners included Ibn Bey, Spruce Baby, Waterfield (fourth in the St Leger Stakes), Too Phar and Old Dundalk (third in the Queen's Vase). Eurobird was restrained towards the rear before moving into contention in the straight by which point both Moon Madness and Ibn Bey were beginning to struggle in the testing conditions. A furlong and a half from the finish she moved alongside the leader Waterfield and the forged clear of the field to win by eight lengths, with Spruce Baby staying on to take second place.

At the end of the year the independent Timeform organisation gave her a rating of 118, making her fourteen pounds inferior to their top-rated three-year-old filly Indian Skimmer. In the official International Classification she was rated the best three-year-old filly in Europe over extended distances.

=== 1988: four-year-old season ===
In all of her races as a four-year-old Eurobird was ridden by the Australian jockey Ron Quinton. On her first appearance of the year she finished unplaced behind Shady Heights in the Tattersalls Gold Cup and was then off the course for three months. She returned in August and started favourite for the Royal Whip Stakes but was beaten a neck into second place by the three-year-old Heavenly Manna. On 24 September she started 6/4 favourite as she attempted to repeat her 1987 success in the Irish St. Leger but finished third behind Dark Lomond and Daarkom. In her two subsequent races she finished third to Kris Kringle in the Blandford Stakes on 16 October and unplaced in the Prix Royal Oak at Longchamp Racecourse a week later.

== Breeding record ==
At the end of her racing career, Eurobird was retired to become a broodmare. She produced at least 14 foals and 10 winners between 1990 and 2005:

- Eurostorm, a bay filly, foaled in 1990, sired by Storm Bird. Won three races: the Derrinstown Stud 1,000 Guineas Trial, Brownstown Stakes and Diamond Stakes.
- Tervel, bay colt (later gelded), 1991, by Chief's Crown. Won two National Hunt races including the Mersey Novices' Hurdle.
- Muhybh, bay filly, 1992, by Dayjur. Failed to win in six races.
- Flocheck, chestnut colt, 1993, by Hansel. Won two races.
- Golden Cat, chestnut filly, 1995, by Storm Cat. Won one race, dam of Pounced.
- Romaha, bay colt (gelded), 1996, by Storm Bird. Won two National Hunt races.
- Garden Society, chestnut colt, 1997, by Caerleon. Won seven races.
- Tamiami Trail, chestnut colt (gelded), 1998, by Indian Ridge. Won one race.
- Bowmore, bay colt (gelded), 1999, by Desert King. Won three races including the Oyster Stakes.
- Balin, chestnut colt (gelded), 2000, by Machiavellian. Failed to win in 15 races.
- Princess of Iona, bay filly, 2001, by Fasliyev. Unraced.
- Lord Crewe, bay colt, 2003, by Sinndar. Won three National Hunt races.
- Wing Express, bay colt, 2004, Montjeu. Won two races.
- Euroceleb, chestnut filly, 2005, by Peintre Celebre. Failed to win in six races.

== Pedigree ==
Pedigree of Eurobird (IRE), chestnut mare, 1984
Sire Ela-Mana-Mou (IRE) 1976	Pitcairn (IRE); 1971	Petingo	Petition
Sire Ela-Mana-Mou (IRE) 1976	Pitcairn (IRE); 1971	Petingo	Alcazar
Sire Ela-Mana-Mou (IRE) 1976	Pitcairn (IRE); 1971	Border Bounty	Bounteous
Sire Ela-Mana-Mou (IRE) 1976	Pitcairn (IRE); 1971	Border Bounty	B Flat
Sire Ela-Mana-Mou (IRE) 1976	Rose Bertin (GB); 1970	High Hat	Hyperion
Sire Ela-Mana-Mou (IRE) 1976	Rose Bertin (GB); 1970	High Hat	Madonna
Sire Ela-Mana-Mou (IRE) 1976	Rose Bertin (GB); 1970	Wide Awake	Major Portion
Sire Ela-Mana-Mou (IRE) 1976	Rose Bertin (GB); 1970	Wide Awake	Wake Island
Dam Irish Bird (USA) 1970	Sea Bird (FR); 1962	Dan Cupid	Native Dancer
Dam Irish Bird (USA) 1970	Sea Bird (FR); 1962	Dan Cupid	Vixenette
Dam Irish Bird (USA) 1970	Sea Bird (FR); 1962	Sicalade	Sicambre
Dam Irish Bird (USA) 1970	Sea Bird (FR); 1962	Sicalade	Marmelade
Dam Irish Bird (USA) 1970	Irish Lass (GB); 1962	Sayajirao	Nearco
Dam Irish Bird (USA) 1970	Irish Lass (GB); 1962	Sayajirao	Rosy Legend
Dam Irish Bird (USA) 1970	Irish Lass (GB); 1962	Scollata	Niccolo Dellarca
Dam Irish Bird (USA) 1970	Irish Lass (GB); 1962	Scollata	Cutaway (family: 8-c)
