= Meld Stakes =

Flat horse race in Ireland

- Class: Group 3
- Location: Leopardstown; County Dublin, Ireland
- Race type: Flat / Thoroughbred
- Sponsor: Aer Lingus College Football Classic (2023)
- Website: Leopardstown

Race information
- Distance: 1m 1f (1,811 metres)
- Surface: Turf
- Track: Left-handed
- Qualification: Three-years-old and up
- Weight: 9 st 0 lb (3yo); 9 st 9 lb (4yo+); Allowances; 3 lb for fillies and mares Penalties; 5 lb for G1 / G2 winners * 3 lb for G3 winners * * since 1 August last year
- Purse: €50,000 (2022); 1st: €30,975

Meld Stakes
2026
| Geryon | Cowardofthecounty | Isaac Newton |

Previous years
2025
Snellen | Purview | Galen
2024
Diego Velazquez | Tarawa | Bright Stripes
2023
Self Belief | Alfred Munnings | Empress Of Beauty
2022
Boundless Ocean | Bear Story | Patrick Sarsfield
2021
Japan | Maker Of Kings | Sinawann

2020-2011
2020
Patrick Sarsfield | Ancient Spirit | Fort Myers
2019
Mohawk | Up Helly Aa | Ancient Spirit
2018
Turret Rocks | Deauville | Hazapour
2017
Moonlight Magic | Deauville | Tennessee Wildcat
2016
Decorated Knight | Portage | Adool
2015
Carla Bianca | Elleval | Brendan Brackan
2014
Parish Hall | Afternoon Sunlight | Ponfeigh
2013
Scintillula | Mars | Along Came Casey
2012
Famous Name | Ballybacka Lady | Native Khan
2011
Famous Name | Dunboyne Express | Creekside

2010-2001
2010
Famous Name | Steinbeck | Bea Remembered
2009
She's Our Mark | Lord Admiral | Casual Conquest
2008
King Of Rome | Lord Admiral | Mustameet
2007
Fracas | Red Rock Canyon | Lord Admiral
2006
Heliostatic | Lord Admiral | Kendor Dine
2005
Tropical Lady | Lord Admiral | Cairdeas
2004
Latino Magic | Solskjaer | Cache Creek
2003
Mingun | Carnival Dancer | In Time's Eye
2002
Imperial Dancer | Chancellor | Sights On Gold
2001
Muakaad | Bonnard | Adonesque

2000-1991
2000
Takali | Yara | Chimes At Midnight
1999
Make No Mistake | Saffron Walden | Golden Rule
1998
Takarian | Make No Mistake | Fruits Of Love
1997
Caiseal Ros | Casey Tibbs | Strawberry Roan
1996
Idris | Predappio | Song Of Tara
1995
Needle Gun | Hushang | Kayaara
1994
Cajarian | Royal Ballerina | Perfect Imposter
1993
Lord Of The Field | Vintage Crop | Danse Royale
1992
Market Booster | Dabtiya | Mirana
1991
Sardaniya | Zafadola | Eileen Jenny

1990-1988
1990
Khalafiya | Crockadore | Emerald Waters
1989
Slender Style | Noora Abu | Wrapping
1988
Sailor's Mate | Dark Lomond | Skating

The Meld Stakes is a Group 3 flat horse race in Ireland open to thoroughbreds aged three years or older. It is run at Leopardstown over a distance of 1 mile and 1 furlong (1,811 metres), and it is scheduled to take place each year in July.

The event was formerly contested over 1 mile and 4 furlongs, and it used to be held at the Curragh in late August or early September. It was previously known as the Brownstown Stakes, and for a period it was restricted to fillies and mares. It was renamed in honour of the successful filly Meld in the 1980s.

The race was reopened to male horses and cut to 1 mile and 2 furlongs in 1993. It was switched to July in 1994. It was transferred to Leopardstown in 2003, and it was shortened to 1 mile and 1 furlong in 2010. The 2014 race was run at the Curragh over 1 mile 2 furlongs. The name Brownstown Stakes is now given to a race at Fairyhouse Racecourse.

== Records ==
Most successful horse (3 wins):

- Famous Name – 2010, 2011, 2012

Leading jockey (8 wins):

- Pat Smullen – Caiseal Ros (1997), Make No Mistake (1999), Muakaad (2001), Famous Name (2010, 2011, 2012), Carla Bianca (2015)
- Kevin Manning - Idris (1996), Tropical Lady (2005), Heliostatic (2006), Scintillula (2013), Parish Hall (2014), Moonlight Magic (2017), Turret Rocks (2018), Boundless Ocean (2022)

Leading trainer (9 wins):

- Dermot Weld – Nanticious (1977), Slender Style (1989), Market Booster (1992), Make No Mistake (1999), Muakaad (2001), Famous Name (2010, 2011, 2012), Carla Bianca (2015)
- Jim Bolger - Idris (1996), Caiseal Ros (1997), Tropical Lady (2005), Heliostatic (2006), Scintillula (2013), Parish Hall (2014), Moonlight Magic (2017), Turret Rocks (2018), Boundless Ocean (2022)

== Winners since 1982 ==
| Year | Winner | Age | Jockey | Trainer | Time |
|---|---|---|---|---|---|
| 1982 | Miraflora | 3 | Pat Eddery | Vincent O'Brien |
| 1983 | Bay Empress | 3 | Pat Gilson | Tommy Burns Sr. |
| 1984 | Opale | 4 | Pat Eddery | Alec Stewart |
| 1985 | Ulterior Motive | 3 | Pat Eddery | John Dunlop |
| 1986 | I Want to Be | 4 | Pat Eddery | John Dunlop |
| 1987 | Three Tails | 3 | John Reid | John Dunlop |
| 1988 | Sailor's Mate | 3 | Willie Carson | Dick Hern | 2:46.70 |
| 1989 | Slender Style | 3 | Michael Kinane | Dermot Weld | 2:38.20 |
| 1990 | Khalafiya | 3 | Ron Quinton | John Oxx | 2:36.90 |
| 1991 | Sardaniya | 3 | Michael Kinane | John Oxx | 2:38.10 |
| 1992 | Market Booster | 3 | Michael Kinane | Dermot Weld | 2:39.90 |
| 1993 | Lord of the Field | 6 | Billy Newnes | James Toller | 2:08.30 |
| 1994 | Cajarian | 3 | Johnny Murtagh | John Oxx | 2:03.80 |
| 1995 | Needle Gun | 5 | Michael Kinane | Clive Brittain | 2:01.60 |
| 1996 | Idris | 6 | Kevin Manning | Jim Bolger | 2:02.60 |
| 1997 | Caiseal Ros | 3 | Pat Smullen | Jim Bolger | 2:06.20 |
| 1998 | Takarian | 3 | Johnny Murtagh | John Oxx | 2:07.90 |
| 1999 | Make No Mistake | 4 | Pat Smullen | Dermot Weld | 2:02.20 |
| 2000 | Takali | 3 | Niall McCullagh | John Oxx | 2:04.10 |
| 2001 | Muakaad | 4 | Pat Smullen | Dermot Weld | 2:01.60 |
| 2002 | Imperial Dancer | 4 | Chris Catlin | Mick Channon | 2:02.20 |
| 2003 | Mingun | 3 | Michael Kinane | Aidan O'Brien | 2:06.90 |
| 2004 | Latino Magic | 4 | Robert Burke | Robbie Osborne | 2:05.70 |
| 2005 | Tropical Lady | 5 | Kevin Manning | Jim Bolger | 2:06.30 |
| 2006 | Heliostatic | 3 | Kevin Manning | Jim Bolger | 2:06.50 |
| 2007 | Fracas | 5 | Wayne Lordan | David Wachman | 2:10.38 |
| 2008 | King of Rome | 3 | Johnny Murtagh | Aidan O'Brien | 2:04.05 |
| 2009 | She's Our Mark | 5 | Danny Grant | Pat Flynn | 2:08.74 |
| 2010 | Famous Name | 5 | Pat Smullen | Dermot Weld | 1:54.62 |
| 2011 | Famous Name | 6 | Pat Smullen | Dermot Weld | 1:56.71 |
| 2012 | Famous Name | 7 | Pat Smullen | Dermot Weld | 1:54.60 |
| 2013 | Scintillula | 3 | Kevin Manning | Jim Bolger | 1:52.64 |
| 2014 | Parish Hall | 5 | Kevin Manning | Jim Bolger | 2:13.77 |
| 2015 | Carla Bianca | 4 | Pat Smullen | Dermot Weld | 1:57.80 |
| 2016 | Decorated Knight | 4 | George Baker | Roger Charlton | 1:55.93 |
| 2017 | Moonlight Magic | 4 | Kevin Manning | Jim Bolger | 1:58.80 |
| 2018 | Turret Rocks | 5 | Kevin Manning | Jim Bolger | 1:55.20 |
| 2019 | Mohawk | 3 | Donnacha O'Brien | Aidan O'Brien | 1:54.98 |
| 2020 | Patrick Sarsfield | 4 | Declan McDonogh | Joseph O'Brien | 1:52.90 |
| 2021 | Japan | 5 | Ryan Moore | Aidan O'Brien | 1:52.99 |
| 2022 | Boundless Ocean | 3 | Kevin Manning | Jim Bolger | 2:00.49 |
| 2023 | Self Belief | 4 | Billy Lee | Willie McCreery | 2:00.82 |
| 2024 | Diego Velazquez | 3 | Ryan Moore | Aidan O'Brien | 1:52.32 |
| 2025 | Snellen | 4 | Shane Foley | Gavin Cromwell | 1:55.32 |
| 2026 | Geryon | 3 | Colin Keane | Ger Lyons | 1:52.34 |

== Earlier winners ==
- 1961: Foot Note
- 1962: Le Prince
- 1963: Intaglio
- 1964: Horse Power
- 1965: Bowzen
- 1966: Albinella
- 1967: Tartan Slipper
- 1968: Wild Goose
- 1969: Let's
- 1970: Bigaroon
- 1971: Ridotto
- 1972: Royal Willya
- 1973: Belted Earl
- 1974: Blood Royal
- 1975: Karelina
- 1976: Slap Up
- 1977: Nanticious
- 1978: Relfo
- 1979: Red Chip
- 1980: My Hollow
- 1981: Gilded Vanity

== See also ==
- Horse racing in Ireland
- List of Irish flat horse races
