= Opale (horse) =

British-bred Thoroughbred racehorse

- Sire: Busted
- Grandsire: Crepello
- Dam: Conning Tower
- Damsire: Connaught
- Sex: Mare
- Foaled: 18 April 1980
- Country: United Kingdom
- Colour: Chestnut
- Breeder: Snailwell Stud
- Owner: Snailwell Stud
- Trainer: Alec Stewart
- Record: 12: 6-2-2

Major wins
- Meld Stakes (1984); Irish St. Leger (1984); Premio Roma (1984 disqualified)

Opale (18 April 1980 – after 1992) was a British Thoroughbred racehorse and broodmare. Unraced as a juvenile she won her first three races as a three-year-old in 1983 and later finished second in the Princess Royal Stakes. In the following year, she was placed in the Geoffrey Freer Stakes and won the Meld Stakes before recording her biggest success in the Irish St. Leger. On her final appearance, she was disqualified after finishing first in the Premio Roma. After her retirement from racing, she became a broodmare and produced several minor winners. Her last recorded foal was born in 1992.

== Background ==
Opale was a "big, rangy" chestnut mare with a white blaze and white socks on her hind legs bred in England by the Snailwell Stud. During her racing career, she was owned by Snailwell and trained by Alec Stewart in Newmarket, Suffolk.

Her sire Busted was the British Horse of the Year in 1967, when he won the Eclipse Stakes and the King George VI and Queen Elizabeth Stakes. The best of Busted's other progeny included the outstanding middle distance performers Bustino and Mtoto. Opale's dam Conning Tower (also bred by Snailwell) won two minor races over one mile as a three-year-old in 1975. Conning Tower was a granddaughter of the Irish mare Esquire Girl (foaled 1952), whose other descendants have included Workforce, Brian Boru and Qualify.

== Racing career ==
=== 1983: three-year-old season ===
Opale was unraced as a two-year-old and did not make her track debut until June 1983, when she won a maiden race over one and a half miles at Catterick Racecourse at odds of 50/1. She followed up by taking a minor event over the same distance at Wolverhampton in the following month and then returned in September to win a handicap race at Doncaster. On her next start, she sustained her first defeat as finished unplaced after her saddle slipped. On her final appearance of the season, she was stepped up in class for the Group 3 Princess Royal Stakes at Ascot Racecourse in October and finished second, one and a half lengths behind the favourite Sylph.

=== 1984: four-year-old season ===
Opale began her second season in the Bessborough Stakes at Royal Ascot in which she finished fourth to the colt Sikorsky, to whom he was conceding 28 pounds in weight. A month later, she recorded her first win of the season, as she won easily in a handicap over the same course and distance. In August, she was moved up in class and distance and matched against male opposition in the Group 2 Geoffrey Freer Stakes over thirteen furlongs at Newbury Racecourse. She seemed unsuited by the slow pace and finished third behind Baynoun and Alphabatim. In September, she was sent to Ireland for the Brownstown Meld Stakes at the Curragh and won by half a length from Marble Run, who had previously finished third in the Irish Oaks. Later that month, she was again matched against male opponents in the Cumberland Lodge Stakes at Ascot and finished second to the gelding Bedtime, with Longboat in third.

In October at the Curagh, Opale was one of nine horses to contest the second running of the Irish St. Leger to be open to older horses. Her opponents include Yawa (Grand Prix de Paris), Centroline (Jockey Club Cup), the Vincent O'Brien-trained Empire Glory (Royal Whip Stakes), Arctic Lord (Blandford Stakes) and Flame of Tara (Coronation Stakes). Ridden by the American jockey Darrel McHargue, she was settled in fifth place as Empire Glory disputed the lead with his stablemate – The Miller. In the straight, the two O'Brien colts began to bump and barge each other, whilst Opale made steady progress on the outside. The British filly stayed on well, gained the advantage in the final strides, and won by a neck from Empire Glory. On her final appearance, Opale was sent to Italy for the Premio Roma at Capannelle Racecourse. She appeared to win the race entirely on merit, beating Yawa by a length, but was relegated to third place for causing interference in the straight.

== Assessment ==
At the end of 1983, Opale was given a rating of 105 by the independent Timeform organisation and was described as being likely to be suited by longer distances and softer ground. In the British Free Handicap for three-year-olds, she was given a rating of 61, making her 30 pounds inferior to the top-rated filly Habibti.

In 1984, Opale was rated on 117 by Timeform, making her twelve pounds inferior to their best stayer Commanche Run, The official British Handicap rated her the sixth-best older female to race in Britain behind Cormorant Wood, Time Charter, Committed, Habibti and Sun Princess.

== Breeding record ==
After her retirement from racing Opale became a broodmare for the Snailwell Stud. She produced at least six foals and four winners between 1986 and 1992:

- Pale Glow, a grey filly, foaled in 1986, sired by Kalaglow. Unplaced on only start.
- Pale Wine, bay colt, 1987, by Rousillon. Won one race.
- Tenayestelign, grey filly, 1988, by Bellypha. Won two flat races and three National Hunt races.
- Blue Marine, bay filly, 1989, by Bellypha. Won two races.
- Picardy, bay filly, 1991, by Polish Precedent. Third on only start.
- Opaque, colt (later gelded), 1992, by Shirley Heights. Won three flat races and one National Hunt races.

== Pedigree ==
Pedigree of Opale (GB), chestnut mare, 1980
Sire Busted (GB) 1963	Crepello (GB); 1954	Donatello	Bleheim
Sire Busted (GB) 1963	Crepello (GB); 1954	Donatello	Delleana
Sire Busted (GB) 1963	Crepello (GB); 1954	Crepuscule	Mieuxce
Sire Busted (GB) 1963	Crepello (GB); 1954	Crepuscule	Red Sunset
Sire Busted (GB) 1963	Sans le Sou (IRE); 1957	Vimy	Wild Risk
Sire Busted (GB) 1963	Sans le Sou (IRE); 1957	Vimy	Mimi
Sire Busted (GB) 1963	Sans le Sou (IRE); 1957	Martial Loan	Court Martial
Sire Busted (GB) 1963	Sans le Sou (IRE); 1957	Martial Loan	Loan
Dam Conning Tower (GB) 1972	Connaught (GB); 1965	St Paddy	Aureole
Dam Conning Tower (GB) 1972	Connaught (GB); 1965	St Paddy	Edie Kelly
Dam Conning Tower (GB) 1972	Connaught (GB); 1965	Nagaika	Goyama
Dam Conning Tower (GB) 1972	Connaught (GB); 1965	Nagaika	Nain
Dam Conning Tower (GB) 1972	Uprising (GB); 1962	High Treason	Court Martial
Dam Conning Tower (GB) 1972	Uprising (GB); 1962	High Treason	Eastern Grandeur
Dam Conning Tower (GB) 1972	Uprising (GB); 1962	Esquire Girl	My Babu
Dam Conning Tower (GB) 1972	Uprising (GB); 1962	Esquire Girl	Lady Sybil (Family: 14-c)

- Opale was inbred 4 × 4 to Court Martial, meaning that this stallion appears twice in the fourth generation of her pedigree.
