= Timarida =

Thoroughbred racehorse

- Sire: Kalaglow
- Grandsire: Kalamoun
- Dam: Triumphant
- Damsire: Track Spare
- Sex: Mare
- Foaled: 11 April 1992
- Country: Ireland
- Colour: Grey
- Breeder: Aga Khan IV
- Owner: Aga Khan IV
- Trainer: John Oxx
- Record: £647,458
- Earnings: 15: 10-2-2

Major wins
- Brownstown Stakes (1995); Matron Stakes (1995); Prix de l'Opéra (1995); E. P. Taylor Stakes (1995); Bayerisches Zuchtrennen (1996); Beverly D. Stakes (1996); Irish Champion Stakes (1996)

Timarida (11 April 1992 – after 2006) was an Irish Thoroughbred racehorse and broodmare bred and owned by the Aga Khan, who competed in six different countries and won major races in five of them. In a racing career which lasted from March 1995 until December 1996 she ran sixteen times, recording ten wins, two seconds and two third places.

As a three-year-old in 1995 she began her season in minor Irish races and made steady improvement, winning seven races including the Brownstown Stakes, Matron Stakes, Prix de l'Opéra and E. P. Taylor Stakes. In the following season she added wins in the Bayerisches Zuchtrennen, Beverly D. Stakes and Irish Champion Stakes.

After her retirement from racing Timarida had some success as a dam of winners for her owner's stud, with her last foal being born in 2006.

== Background ==
Timarida was a grey mare bred in Ireland by her owner Aga Khan IV. During her racing career she was trained at Kilcullen in County Kildare by John Oxx.

Timarida's sire Kalaglow, from whom she inherited her grey colour, was a top-class middle-distance horse who won the Eclipse Stakes and King George VI and Queen Elizabeth Stakes in 1982. The best of his other offspring included the Melbourne Cup winner Jeune and the Grosser Preis von Berlin winner Sternkoenig. Her dam Triumphant showed modest racing ability, winning one minor race at Chester Racecourse from eight starts as a three-year-old in 1980. She was, however, a half-sister to Relkino, and, as descendant of the broodmare Ballisland, was closely related to Tarascon and Al Hareb.

== Racing career ==
=== 1995: three-year-old season ===
Timarida did not race as a two-year-old and made her racecourse debut in a minor race over seven furlongs on heavy ground at Leopardstown Racecourse on 17 March. Ridden by Christy Roche he started the 7/4 favourite and won by two lengths from her stablemate Sharatan. She was then off the racecourse for two and a half months before returning to the track to win a handicap race at the Curragh, beating seventeen opponents under top weight of 128 pounds. She followed up by winning a similar event at Galway Races on 1 August and was then stepped up in class to contest the Listed Brownstown Stud Stakes over one mile at Leopardstown six days later. Ridden by Johnny Murtagh she started the 7/4 favourite and won by four lengths from the Aidan O'Brien-trained Anemone Garden. Less than two weeks later the filly was back in action and stepped up again in class for the Group 3 Desmond Stakes at the Curragh in which she was matched against male opposition and older fillies and mares. Ridden by Roche she came from off the pace to challenge for the lead in the last quarter mile but hung to the right in the closing stages and was beaten a head by the five-year-old mare Ivory Frontier. After an enquiry by the racecourse stewards Ivory Frontier and Timarida were relegated to second and third for causing interference to the third-placed finisher Mr Martini.

On 10 September Timarida returned to all-female competition for the Matron Stakes (then a Group 3 race) at the Curragh and started 7/2 second favourite behind the British challenger Warning Shadows who had finished second to Ridgewood Pearl in the Irish 1000 Guineas. Ridden by Murtagh, Timarida turned into the straight in fifth place before moving up to dispute the lead in the final quarter mile. She stayed on strongly in the closing stages and won by a neck and half a length from Lap of Luury and Warning Shadows. Three weeks later the filly was stepped up to Group 2 class when she was sent to France for the Prix de l'Opéra over 1800 metres at Longchamp Racecourse. She was coupled in the betting with the Aga Khan's French-trained filly Balanka and started 2.5/1 favourite ahead of nine other fillies and mares including Vadlamixa (Prix de Lieurey), Garden Rose (Prix Chloé), Angel In My Heart (Prix de Psyché), Tryphosa (German 1,000 Guineas) and Erin Bird (Premio Regina Elena). Timarida raced towards the rear of the field before being switched to the outside by Murtagh in the straight. She took the lead 200 metres from the finish and drew away in the closing stages to win by two and a half lengths from Angel In My Heart.

Frankie Dettori took the ride when Timarida was sent to Canada to contest the Grade II |E. P. Taylor Stakes over ten furlongs at Woodbine Racetrack on 15 October. She was made the 5.5/1 second favourite behind the French challenger Matiara (Poule d'Essai des Pouliches) in a thirteen-runner field which also included Northern Emerald (Flower Bowl Invitational Stakes), Danish (Queen Elizabeth II Challenge Cup Stakes) and Warning Shadows. After settling in sixth place Timarida moved forward approaching the final turn, took the lead in the straight and won by three and a half lengths from Matiara.

=== 1996: four-year-old season ===
As a four-year-old Timarida was ridden in all of her races by Murtagh. After winning seven of her eight races in 1995, the filly began her third campaign with three consecutive defeats. She finished second to the colt Definite Article in the Tattersalls Gold Cup at the Curragh in May and then made her only appearance in England when she ran poorly and finished unplaced in the Queen Anne Stakes over one mile at Royal Ascot in June. At the end of the month she started favourite for the International Stakes but despite finishing strongly she failed to overhaul the British-trained three-year-old colt Gothenberg. She was then sent to Germany to contest the Group 1 Bayerisches Zuchtrennen at Munich on 4 August. Her opponents included Germany, La Blue (German 1,000 Guineas), Montjoy (Prix Guillaume d'Ornano) and Needle Gun (Gallinule Stakes). In a finish dominated by females Timarida took the lead 200 metres from the finish and won by half a length and a neck from Germany and La Blue.

Less than three weeks after her victory in Germany, Timarida made her first appearance in the United States when she ran in the Grade I Beverly D Stakes over nine and a half furlongs on firm turf at Arlington Park in Chicago. She was made the 1.6/1 joint favourite alongside the French contender Khalisa (Prix Chloé) with the other eight runners including Matiara, Perfect Arc (Queen Elizabeth II Challenge Cup), Bail Out Becky (Del Mar Oaks), Auriette (Gamely Handicap), Alpride (Yellow Ribbon Invitational Stakes) and Flagbird (Premio Presidente della Repubblica). After being restrained by Murtagh in the early stages Timarida overtook the front-running Perfect Arc in the straight and pulled away to win by two and a half lengths. Matiara died soon after the race as a result of a pelvic injury. Commenting on the race John Oxx said "We were a bit concerned that we would end up farther back than we'd like. Then, you need a little luck. That's exactly what happenened. When the gap opened, she was ready to take it." The Aga Khan observed "Timarida is a very courageous filly and has a tremendous turn of foot."

On her return to Europe Timarida contested the Irish Champion Stakes at Leopardstown on 14 September. Her opponents on this occasion were Shaamit, Dance Design, Tamayaz (Rose of Lancaster Stakes), Glory of Dancer (Gran Criterium, Great Voltigeur Stakes) and Idris (Desmond Stakes). After racing at the rear of the field as Dance Design set the pace, the filly was switched to the outside to make her challenge in the last quarter mile. She overtook Dance Design inside the final furlong and won "snugly" by one and a half lengths. Following Timarida's third consecutive win at the highest level the Aga Khan let it be known that the filly would probably be retired from racing at the end of the season.

At Newmarket Racecourse on 19 October Timarida ran for the second time in England in a very strong edition of the Champion Stakes and finished third behind Bosra Sham and Halling. On her final run of the season she was sent to the United States again and finished fourth to Wandesta in the Matriarch Stakes at Hollywood Park Racetrack on 1 December.

== Breeding record ==
After her retirement from racing Timarida became a broodmare for the Aga Khan's stud in Ireland. She produced at least seven foals and five winners between 1998 and 2006:

- Tilimsana, a bay filly, foaled in 1998, sired by Darshaan. Unraced.
- Timawari, bay colt (later gelded), 1999, by Sadler's Wells. Won two races.
- Timisvar, bay colt, 2002, by Sinndar. Won one National Hunt race.
- Timakara, bay filly, 2003, by Green Desert. Unplaced in only start.
- Timarwa, bay filly, 2004, by Daylami. Won two races including Lanwades Stud Fillies' Stakes.
- Timari, grey colt (gelded), 2005, by Dalakhani. Won one race.
- Timabirya, grey filly, 2006, by Linamix. Won one race.

== Pedigree ==
Pedigree of Timarida (IRE), grey mare, 1992
Sire Kalaglow (IRE) 1978	Kalamoun (GB); 1970	Zeddaan	Grey Sovereign
Sire Kalaglow (IRE) 1978	Kalamoun (GB); 1970	Zeddaan	Vareta
Sire Kalaglow (IRE) 1978	Kalamoun (GB); 1970	Khairunessa	Prince Bio
Sire Kalaglow (IRE) 1978	Kalamoun (GB); 1970	Khairunessa	Palariva
Sire Kalaglow (IRE) 1978	Rossitor (GB); 1970	Pall Mall	Palestine
Sire Kalaglow (IRE) 1978	Rossitor (GB); 1970	Pall Mall	Malapert
Sire Kalaglow (IRE) 1978	Rossitor (GB); 1970	Sonia	Worden
Sire Kalaglow (IRE) 1978	Rossitor (GB); 1970	Sonia	Sonsa
Dam Triumphant (GB) 1977	Track Spare (IRE); 1963	Sound Track	Whistler
Dam Triumphant (GB) 1977	Track Spare (IRE); 1963	Sound Track	Bridle Way
Dam Triumphant (GB) 1977	Track Spare (IRE); 1963	Rosy Myth	Nearco
Dam Triumphant (GB) 1977	Track Spare (IRE); 1963	Rosy Myth	Rosy Dolly
Dam Triumphant (GB) 1977	Pugnacity (GB); 1962	Pampered King	Prince Chevalier
Dam Triumphant (GB) 1977	Pugnacity (GB); 1962	Pampered King	Netherton Maid
Dam Triumphant (GB) 1977	Pugnacity (GB); 1962	Ballynulta	Djebel
Dam Triumphant (GB) 1977	Pugnacity (GB); 1962	Ballynulta	Ballisland (Family 13-e)
