= Alleged Stakes =

Flat horse race in Ireland

Alleged Stakes
2026
Starford	Beset	Red Letter

Previous years
2025
Galen	Jan Brueghel	Sons And Lovers
2024
White Birch	Maxux	Village Voice
2023
Point Lonsdale	Visualisation	Layfayette
2022
Layfayette	High Definition	Bear Story
2021
Broome	Thundering Nights	Up Helly Aa

2020-2011
2020
Buckhurst	Sir Dragonet	Numerian
2019
Magical	Flag Of Honour	Latrobe
2018
Capri	Cannonball	Beautiful Morning
2017
Air Pilot	Success Days	US Army Ranger
2016
Zhukova	Success Days	Found
2015
Parish Hall	Loch Garman	Waltzing Matilda
2014
Inis Meain	Tarana	Parish Hall
2013
Parish Hall	Inis Meain	Steps To Freedom
2012
Chrysanthemum	Vivacious Vivienne	Clare Glen
2011
Unaccompanied	Cilium	St Nicholas Abbey

2010-2003
2010
She's Our Mark	Popmurphy	Fame And Glory
2009
Baron De'L	Estrela Brage	Celtic Dane
2008
Red Moloney	Alarazi	Profound Beauty
2007
Dylan Thomas	Fracas	Heliostatic
2006
Arch Rebel	Tolpuddle	Kalderon
2005
Sublimity	Acropolis	Cairdeas
2004
Brian Boru	Napper Tandy	Dawn Invasion
2003
Black Sam Bellamy	Holy Orders	Calorando

The Alleged Stakes is a Group 3 flat horse race in Ireland open to thoroughbreds aged four years or older. It is run over a distance of 1 mile and 2 furlongs (2,012 metres) at the Curragh in April.

The race was first run in 2003. The race is named in honour of Alleged who was trained by Vincent O'Brien to win the Prix de l'Arc de Triomphe in 1977 and 1978. The 2017 running commemorated the centenary of O'Brien's birth. It was upgraded from Listed status to Group 3 in 2017.

== Records ==
Most successful horse (2 wins):

- Parish Hall – 2013, 2015

Leading jockey (3 wins):

- Ryan Moore – Capri (2018), Magical (2019), Broome (2021)
- Wayne Lordan - Chrysanthemum (2012), Buckhurst (2020), Point Lonsdale (2023)

Leading trainer (7 wins):

- Aidan O'Brien – Black Sam Bellamy (2003), Brian Boru (2004), Dylan Thomas (2007), Capri (2018), Magical (2019), Broome (2021), Point Lonsdale (2023)

== Winners ==
Year	Winner	Age	Jockey	Trainer	Time
2003	Black Sam Bellamy	4	Michael Kinane	Aidan O'Brien	2:06.50
2004	Brian Boru	4	Jamie Spencer	Aidan O'Brien	2:10.80
2005	Sublimity	5	Johnny Murtagh	John G Carr	2:19.30
2006	Arch Rebel	5	Johnny Murtagh	Noel Meade	2:26.00
2007	Dylan Thomas	4	Seamie Heffernan	Aidan O'Brien	2:12.40
2008	Red Moloney	4	Declan McDonogh	Kevin Prendergast	2:31.82
2009	Baron De'L	6	Fran Berry	Edward P Harty	2:15.08
2010	She's Our Mark	6	Danny Grant	Patrick J Flynn	2:23.04
2011	Unaccompanied	4	Pat Smullen	Dermot Weld	2:24.26
2012	Chrysanthemum	4	Wayne Lordan	David Wachman	2:20.93
2013	Parish Hall	4	Kevin Manning	Jim Bolger	2:14.63
2014	Inis Meain	7	Danny Mullins	Denis Gerard Hogan	2:15.95
2015	Parish Hall	6	Kevin Manning	Jim Bolger	2:13.41
2016	Zhukova	4	Pat Smullen	Dermot Weld	2:23.89
2017	Air Pilot (Note: The 2017, 2018 and 2019 races took place at Naas due to redevelopment work at The Curragh.)	8	Fran Berry	Ralph Beckett	2:18.75
2018	Capri	4	Ryan Moore	Aidan O'Brien	2:27.13
2019	Magical	4	Ryan Moore	Aidan O'Brien	2:14.44
2020	Buckhurst	4	Wayne Lordan	Joseph O'Brien	2:14.99
2021	Broome	5	Ryan Moore	Aidan O'Brien	2:05.43
2022	Layfayette	5	Oisin Orr	Noel Meade	2:09.19
2023	Point Lonsdale	4	Wayne Lordan	Aidan O'Brien	2:24.79
2024	White Birch	4	Colin Keane	John Joseph Murphy	2:15.89
2025	Galen	4	Dylan Browne McMonagle	Joseph O'Brien	2:06.78
2026	Starford	4	Scott McCullagh	Joseph O'Brien	2:12.96

== See also ==
- Horse racing in Ireland
- List of Irish flat horse races
