= Diamond Stakes =

Flat horse race in Ireland

- Class: Listed
- Location: Dundalk Stadium; County Louth, Ireland
- Race type: Flat / Thoroughbred
- Sponsor: Al Basti
- Website: Dundalk

Race information
- Distance: 1m 2f 150y (2,149 m)
- Surface: Polytrack
- Track: Left-handed
- Qualification: Three-years-old and up
- Weight: 9 st 3 lb (3yo); 9 st 8 lb (4yo+); Allowances; 3 lb for fillies and mares Penalties; 5 lb for Group 1 winners * 3 lb for Group 2 winners * * since 1 January
- Purse: €50,000 (2021); 1st: €29,500

Diamond Stakes
2026
Military Order	Geryon	Alla Stella

Previous years
2025
Phantom Flight	Ameerat Jumaira	Omni Man
2024
Bellezza	Madam Celeste	Platoon
2023
Piz Badile	Sea The Casper	San Andreas
2022
Bear Story	Freescape	Annerville
2021
Bear Story	Lough Derg	Khartoum

2020-2011
2020
Bowerman	Sky Seven	Gold Maze
2019
Blenheim Palace	Numerian	Antilles
2018
Mootasadir	Global Giant	Kalaxana
2017
War Decree	Absolute Blast	Abingdon
2016
Long Island Sound	Battalion	Hawke
2015
Panama Hat	Carla Bianca	Unsinkable
2014
Cat O'Mountain	Prince Of All	Bayrir
2013
Parish Hall	Manalapan	Afonso De Sousa
2012
Declaration Of War	Along Came Casey	Aloof
2011
Freedom	High Ruler	Zanughan

2010-2001
2010
Gitano Hernando	Wade Giles	Mid Mon Lady
2009
Mastercraftsman	Fiery Lad	Augustusthestrong
2008
Muhannak	Mr Medici	Fiery Lad
2007
Arch Rebel	Fracas	Crossing
2006
Mountain	Cool Touch	Bon Nuit
2005
The Carbon Unit	Liss Ard	Imperial Brief
2004
Mikado	Ecomium	Mingun
2003
Napper Tandy	Multazem	Mkuzi
2002
Miss Honorine	Sights On Gold	Chartres
2001
Jammaal	Chamela Bay	Affianced

2000-1991
2000
Dolydille	Fantasia Girl	Tobaranama
1999
Remuria	Catherina	Queen's Love
1998
Darina	Geisha Girl	Golden Cat
1997
Red Affair	Samira	Darrouzett
1996
French Ballerina	Asmara	Viaticum
1995
Viaticum	Magic Feeling	Hasainiya
1993
Eurostorm	Tryarra	Katiba
1991
Elfaslah	Zivania	Whitesville

1990-1988
1990
Santella Bell	Sunset Partner	Walliser
1989
Bex	Welsh Love	Wrapping
1988
Karaferya	Causa Sua	Break Fast

The Diamond Stakes is a Listed flat horse race in Ireland open to thoroughbreds aged three years or older. It is run at Dundalk over a distance of 1 mile, 2 furlongs and 150 yards (2,149 metres), and it is scheduled to take place each year in September or October.

== History ==
The event was formerly classed at Listed level and contested on turf over 1 mile and 2 furlongs. For a period it was held at Phoenix Park, and it switched to the Curragh in 1991. It used to be restricted to fillies and mares, but it was opened to male horses in 2001. It was staged at Fairyhouse in 2006 and 2007.

The Diamond Stakes moved to Dundalk in 2008, and since then it has been run on a Polytrack surface over 1 mile, 2 furlongs and 150 yards. It became Ireland's first non-turf Group race in 2009, when it was promoted to Group 3 status. It was downgraded back to Listed status in 2022.

The Diamond Stakes was added to the Breeders' Cup Challenge series in 2009, with the winner earning an automatic invitation to compete in the Breeders' Cup Marathon. It was removed from the series in 2011.

== Records ==
Most successful horse since 1988: (2 wins)

- Bear Story - 2021,2022

Leading jockey since 1988 (5 wins):

- Kevin Manning – Ballykett Nancy (1994), Darina (1998), Dolydille (2000), Napper Tandy (2003), Parish Hall (2013)

Leading trainer since 1988 (8 wins):

- Aidan O'Brien – Mikado (2004), Mountain (2006), Mastercraftsman (2009), Freedom (2011), Declaration of War (2012), Long Island Sound (2016), War Decree (2017), Blenheim Palace (2019)

== Winners since 1988 ==
Year	Winner	Age	Jockey	Trainer	Time
	Turf before 2008
1988	Karaferya	3	John Reid	Michael Stoute	2:02.40
1989	Bex	3	Willie Carson	Robert Armstrong	2:04.60
1990	Santella Bell	3	Warren O'Connor	Michael O'Brien	2:07.20
1991	Elfaslah	3	Richard Hills	Harry Thomson Jones	2:16.10
1992	Misako-Togo	3	Michael Kinane	Dermot Weld	2:11.10
1993	Eurostorm	3	Pat Gilson	Con Collins	2:18.30
1994	Ballykett Nancy	3	Kevin Manning	Jim Bolger	2:20.40
1995	Viaticum	3	Joanna Morgan	Noel Meade	2:09.60
1996	French Ballerina	3	Michael Kinane	Pat Flynn	2:14.20
1997	Red Affair	3	Pat Shanahan	John Oxx	2:07.80
1998	Darina	3	Kevin Manning	Jim Bolger	2:18.40
1999	Remuria	3	Niall McCullagh	John Oxx	2:23.90
2000	Dolydille	4	Kevin Manning	Jim Bolger	2:18.10
2001	Jammaal	4	Pat Smullen	Dermot Weld	2:13.90
2002	Miss Honorine	3	Johnny Murtagh	John Oxx	2:08.10
2003	Napper Tandy	3	Kevin Manning	Jim Bolger	2:04.00
2004	Mikado	3	Colm O'Donoghue	Aidan O'Brien	2:11.40
2005	The Carbon Unit	3	Wayne Lordan	Con Collins	2:13.90
2006	Mountain	3	Kieren Fallon	Aidan O'Brien	2:15.00
2007	Arch Rebel	6	Fran Berry	Noel Meade	2:04.86
	Polytrack after 2007
2008	Muhannak	4	Pat Smullen	Ralph Beckett	2:11.63
2009	Mastercraftsman	3	Johnny Murtagh	Aidan O'Brien	2:12.18
2010	Gitano Hernando	4	Kieren Fallon	Marco Botti	2:12.94
2011	Freedom	3	Seamie Heffernan	Aidan O'Brien	2:10.92
2012	Declaration of War	3	Joseph O'Brien	Aidan O'Brien	2:11.66
2013	Parish Hall	4	Kevin Manning	Jim Bolger	2:10.97
2014	Cat O'Mountain	4	Fran Berry	Charlie Appleby	2:09.76
2015	Panama Hat	4	Chris Hayes	Andy Oliver	2:17.39
2016	Long Island Sound	3	Seamie Heffernan	Aidan O'Brien	2:14.50
2017	War Decree	3	Donnacha O'Brien	Aidan O'Brien	2:12.66
2018	Mootasadir	3	Pat Cosgrave	Hugo Palmer	2:12.52
2019	Blenheim Palace	3	Donnacha O'Brien	Aidan O'Brien	2:12.97
2020	Bowerman	6	Colin Keane	Adrian McGuinness	2:13.56
2021	Bear Story	3	Ronan Whelan	Michael Halford	2:13.60
2022	Bear Story	4	Ronan Whelan	Michael Halford	2:15.26
2023	Piz Badile	4	Gavin Ryan	Donnacha O'Brien	2:13.44
2024	Bellezza	3	Chris Hayes	Ger Lyons	2:15.34
2025	Phantom Flight	6	Seamie Heffernan	George Scott	2:11.61

== See also ==
- Horse racing in Ireland
- List of Irish flat horse races
