= Parish Hall =

Irish-bred Thoroughbred racehorse

- Racing silks of Jackie Bolger
- Sire: Teofilo
- Grandsire: Galileo
- Dam: Halla Siamsa
- Damsire: Montjeu
- Sex: Stallion
- Foaled: 7 February 2009
- Country: Ireland
- Colour: Bay
- Breeder: Jim Bolger
- Owner: Jackie Bolger
- Trainer: Jim Bolger
- Record: 26: 6-9-3
- Earnings: £428,631

Major wins
- Dewhurst Stakes (2011); Alleged Stakes (2013, 2015); Diamond Stakes (2013); Meld Stakes (2014)

Parish Hall (foaled 7 February 2009) is an Irish-bred Thoroughbred racehorse. Bred, owned and trained by the Bolger family he won one of his first four starts as a two-year-old in 2011 before recording an upset victory in the Group One Dewhurst Stakes. He was regarded as a serious contender for the 2012 Epsom Derby but sustained a serious leg injury in the spring and missed the whole of his second season. He returned to the track in 2014 and in the next three seasons he proved himself to be a consistent middle-distance performer although slightly below top class. He won the Alleged Stakes and the Diamond Stakes in 2013, the Meld Stakes in 2014 and a second Alleged Stakes in 2015. Apart from his victories he was placed in numerous good races including the Tyros Stakes, Futurity Stakes, Mooresbridge Stakes (three times), International Stakes (twice), Royal Whip Stakes, Cumberland Lodge Stakes and Silver Stakes.

== Background ==
Parish Hall is a bay colt with a white star bred in Ireland by his trainer Jim Bolger. He was from the first crop of foals sired by the Bolger's stallion Teofilo the undefeated European Champion Two-Year-Old of 2006. Teofilo's other offspring have included Trading Leather, Pleascach, Arod (Summer Mile Stakes) and Kermadec (Doncaster Handicap). Parish Hall's dam Halla Siamsa (Irish for Entertainment Hall) showed modest racing ability, winning a maiden race at Fairyhouse from seven starts for the Bolgers in 2006 and 2007. She was a half-sister to Light Heavy (winner of the Derrinstown Stud Derby Trial and third in the Irish Derby) and a descendant of the French broodmare Evisa (foaled 1968), making her a close relative of the Ascot Gold Cup winners Enzeli and Estimate.

Like his sire, Parish Hall was trained by Bolger in County Carlow and raced in the colours of Bolger's wife Jackie. He was ridden in all but one of his races by Kevin Manning.

== Racing career ==
=== 2011: two-year-old season ===
Parish Hall made his racecourse debut in a maiden race over six furlongs at Leopardstown Racecourse on 10 April and started the 4/1 second favourite in a seven-runner field. After chasing the leaders he produced a strong late run to overtake the Aidan O'Brien-trained favourite Raphael Santi fifty yards from the finish and won by three quarters of a length.

After a three-month break Parish Hall was stepped up in class for the Group Three Tyros Stakes at Leopardstown on 21 July and finished second to the filly Remember Alexander. Just over two weeks later he was promoted in class again and started a 14/1 outsider for the Group One Phoenix Stakes over six furlongs at the Curragh. He was among the leaders approaching the last quarter mile but the faded from contention and finished eighth behind La Collina, a filly who won by a neck from the favoured Power. In the Group Two Futurity Stakes over seven furlongs at the same track on 20 August he stayed on in the closing stages without looking likely to win and finished second, one and three quarter lengths behind the winner Dragon Pulse.

On his final run of the year, Parish Hall was sent to England for the Group One Dewhurst Stakes over seven furlong at Newmarket Racecourse and started the 20/1 eighth choice in a nine-runner field. Power, having beaten Dragon Pulse in the National Stakes, was made the 15/8 favourite ahead of Bronterre (Stardom Stakes) whilst the other fancied runners included Most Improved, Trumpet Major (Champagne Stakes) and Red Duke (Superlative Stakes). The outsider Spiritual Star set the pace, with Manning settling Parish Hall just behind the leader before going to the front approaching the final furlong. He held off several challengers in the closing stages before prevailing by half a length from Power, with Most Improved, Bronterre and Trumpet Major finishing close behind. After the race Bolger who was winning the race for the fourth time said "The ground is the key to this horse and, on good ground, I thought we had a serious chance. He is right there with his father – there's no doubt he's in that league. I think this fella's chance of staying a mile and a half is at least as good as New Approach had. He is a very sound horse, so I would be looking at him as an Epsom horse."

=== 2012: three-year-old season ===
In 2012 Parish Hall was trained for the 2000 Guineas but was withdrawn two days before the race. On 26 May it was announced that the colt would miss his intended runs in the Irish 2,000 Guineas and The Derby owing to a leg infection. Bolger stated "It's not a very pleasant experience so close to the race. At this stage I've no idea how long it will keep him off for but this rules out Epsom as well". In fact Parish Hall did not race again in 2012.

=== 2013: four-year-old season ===
On 7 April Parish Hall made his first appearance for eighteen months in the Listed Alleged Stakes over ten furlongs at the Curragh and started the 11/8 favourite against five opponents. He raced towards the rear of the field before taking the lead inside the final furlong and winning by one and a half lengths from the six-year-old gelding Inis Meain. On 6 May he contested the Mooresbridge Stakes over the same course and distance and finished third to Camelot.

After a four-month absence Parish Hall returned in the Irish Champion Stakes on 7 September in which he started a 33/1 outsider and finished fourth behind The Fugue, Al Kazeem and Trading Leather. In October the colt was dropped in class for the Group Three Diamond Stakes on the Polytrack surface at Dundalk Racecourse and started second favourite behind the Aidan O'Brien-trained Alfonso de Sousa. After racing in third place he overtook the favourite approaching the final furlong and won "comfortably" by one and a quarter lengths from the three-year-old Manalapan. The colt ended the year with a trip to England to contest the Champion Stakes at Ascot Racecourse on 19 October. Starting a 50/1 outsider he was in contention for most of the way and was still in third place in entering the straight but faded badly in the closing stages and finished ninth of the ten runners behind Farhh.

=== 2014: five-year-old season ===
Parish Hall began his 2014 campaign by finishing third to Inis Meain when favourite for the Alleged Stakes and then ran poorly when running sixth in the Martin Molony Stakes at Limerick Racecourse. He returned to his best form in the Mooresbridge Stakes in May when he took the lead a furlong out before being caught in the final strides being beaten a neck by Magician. The horse was well beaten when sixth in the Prince of Wales's Stakes and then finished second, beaten a neck by Mekong River in the International Stakes at the Curragh on 29 June. In the Meld Stakes over ten furlongs at the Curragh on 20 July Parish Hall started the 11/8 favourite against three opponents including the Derrinstown Stud 1,000 Guineas Trial winner Afternoon Sunlight. After racing at the rear of the field, he moved into second place behind Afternoon Sunlight approaching the final furlong and overtook the filly in the final strides and won by half a length. Una Manning, daughter of winning trainer Jim Bolger, said: "Dad was delighted. The horse showed a good turn of foot and he'll stick to races over this trip and on fast ground. He really feels that he's finally getting over his injury and that he'll go on to better things".

In August Parish Hall started favourite for the Royal Whip Stakes at the Curragh but finished third behind Hall of Mirrors and Kingsbarns. In the following month he was dropped back in distance for the Clipper Boomerang Mile at Leopardstown and finished sixth of the eight runners. In October he contested the Cumberland Lodge Stakes over one and a half miles at Ascot and produced one of his best performance. After racing in last place for most of the way he produced a strong late run and failed by only a neck to peg back Pether's Moon with Encke taking third place. Parish Hall ended his season with an appearance at Sha Tin Racecourse in December, making little impact as he finished eleventh to Flintshire in the Hong Kong Vase.

=== 2015: six-year-old season ===
On his six-year-old debut Parish Hall started odds-on favourite for a minor event at Dundalk on 6 March but was beaten a head by the gelding Shalaman. On 19 April the horse attempted to repeat his 2013 success in the Alleged Stakes and started the 9/2 second favourite behind the Dermot Weld-trained mare Massinga. The outsider Queen of Alba opened up a long lead with Parish Hall held up towards the rear of the eight-runner field before producing a sustained run on the outside. He took the lead inside the last quarter mile and stayed on well to win by two lengths from his stablemate Loch Garman. Bolger commented "He always runs a good race. I think he'll get back maybe to the level where he was as a two-year-old. He is in great form at the moment and loving life" whilst Manning said "He won very well. When I let him go he quickened up. He is a real uncomplicated horse."

In May Parish Hall was placed for the third successive year in the Mooresbridge Stakes as he finished second to Fascinating Rock and then came home fifth of the six runners behind Al Kazeem in the Group One Tattersalls Gold Cup. On 7 June Parish Hall started odds-on favourite for the Listed Silver Stakes at the Curragh but was beaten a neck by the Dermot Weld-trained three-year-old Postulation. An unusual feature of the race was that Parish Hall lunged at his younger rival and attempted to bite him in the final strides. On his final racecourse appearance three weeks later Parish Hall finished second to the British-trained Air Pilot in the International Stakes at the Curragh.

== Assessment ==
In the 2011 European Thoroughbred Rankings, Parish Hall was given a rating of 117, making him the equal-third best juvenile of the year, two pounds behind the top-rated pair Camelot and Dabirsim.

== Pedigree ==
Pedigree of Parish Hall (IRE), bay colt, 2009
Sire Teofilo 2004	Galileo; 1998	Sadler's Wells (USA)	Northern Dancer (CAN)
Sire Teofilo 2004	Galileo; 1998	Sadler's Wells (USA)	Fairy Bridge
Sire Teofilo 2004	Galileo; 1998	Urban Sea (USA)	Miswaki
Sire Teofilo 2004	Galileo; 1998	Urban Sea (USA)	Allegretta (GB)
Sire Teofilo 2004	Speirbhean; 1998	Danehill (USA)	Danzig
Sire Teofilo 2004	Speirbhean; 1998	Danehill (USA)	Razyana
Sire Teofilo 2004	Speirbhean; 1998	Saviour (USA)	Majestic Light
Sire Teofilo 2004	Speirbhean; 1998	Saviour (USA)	Victorian Queen (CAN)
Dam Halla Siamsa 2004	Montjeu; 1996	Sadler's Wells (USA)	Northern Dancer (CAN)
Dam Halla Siamsa 2004	Montjeu; 1996	Sadler's Wells (USA)	Fairy Bridge
Dam Halla Siamsa 2004	Montjeu; 1996	Floripedes (FR)	Top Ville (IRE)
Dam Halla Siamsa 2004	Montjeu; 1996	Floripedes (FR)	Toute Cy
Dam Halla Siamsa 2004	Siamsa (USA); 1997	Quest for Fame (GB)	Rainbow Quest (USA)
Dam Halla Siamsa 2004	Siamsa (USA); 1997	Quest for Fame (GB)	Aryenne (FR)
Dam Halla Siamsa 2004	Siamsa (USA); 1997	Amoura	Northfields
Dam Halla Siamsa 2004	Siamsa (USA); 1997	Amoura	Visala (FR) (Family: 13-c)

- Parish Hall was inbred 3 × 3 to Sadler's Wells, meaning that this stallion appears twice in the third generation of his pedigree.
