= Mercury Stakes =

Flat horse race in Ireland

Mercury Stakes
2026
Washington Heights	Ain't Nobody	This Moment

Previous years
2025
Spartan Arrow	West Acre	Queen Of Mougins
2024
Ostraka	Powerful Nation	Electric Storm
2023
Dun Na Sead	Bouttemont	The Highway Rat
2022
Manaccan	Logo Hunter	Funny Money Honey
2021
The Highway Rat	May Sonic	Strong Johnson

2020-2011
2020
Urban Beat	Muker	My Laureate
2019
Dr Simpson	Dream Shot	Corinthia Knight
2018
Hit The Bid	Encore d'Or	Lost Treasure
2017
Take Cover	Hit The Bid	Declarationofpeace
2016
Caspian Prince	Moviesta	Medicean Man
2015
Take Cover	Speed Hawk	Marsha
2014
Sir Maximilian	Abstraction	Russian Soul
2013
Timeless Call	Monsieur Joe	Angels Will Fall
2012
Balmont Mast	Nocturnal Affair	Timeless Call
2011
Nocturnal Affair	Breathless Kiss	Balmont Mast

2010-2008
2010
Invincible Ash	Hitchens	Luisant
2009
Arganil	Rain Delayed	Perfect Polly
2008
Borderlescott	Invincible Ash	Masta Plasta

The Mercury Stakes is a Group 3 flat horse race in Ireland open to thoroughbreds aged two years or older. It is run at Dundalk over a distance of 5 furlongs (1,006 metres), and it is scheduled to take place each year in October.

The race was first run in 2008. It was previously run a Listed race before being upgraded to Group 3 status in 2018. The 2020 race was run in memory of Pat Smullen, an Irish champion jockey who rode his first and last winners at Dundalk, who died in September 2020.

== Records ==
Most successful horse (2 wins):

- Take Cover – 2015, 2017

, Leading jockey (2 wins):

- Stevie Donohoe – Sir Maximilian (2014), Manaccan (2022)

Leading trainer (2 wins):

- David Griffiths – Take Cover (2015,2017)
- Daniel Murphy - Dun Na Sead (2023), Ostraka (2024)
- Kevin Ryan - Arganil (2009), Washington Heights (2026)

== Winners ==
Year	Winner	Age	Jockey	Trainer	Time
2008	Borderlescott	6	Pat Cosgrave	Robin Bastiman	0:59.10
2009	Arganil	4	Keagan Latham	Kevin Ryan	0:58.03
2010	Invincible Ash	5	Gary Carroll	Michael Halford	0:58.10
2011	Nocturnal Affair	6	Colm O'Donoghue	David Marnane	0:57.70
2012	Balmont Mast	4	Johnny Murtagh	Edward Lynam	0:57.35
2013	Timeless Call	5	Pat Smullen	Reginald Roberts	0:58.85
2014	Sir Maximilian	5	Stevie Donohoe	Ian Williams	0:58.20
2015	Take Cover	8	Fran Berry	David Griffiths	0:58.00
2016	Caspian Prince	7	Declan McDonogh	Roger Fell	0:57.10
2017	Take Cover	10	David Allan	David Griffiths	0:58.55
2018	Hit The Bid	4	Chris Hayes	Darren Bunyan	0:57.83
2019	Dr Simpson	2	Rory Cleary	Tom Dascombe	0:58.36
2020	Urban Beat	5	Ben Coen	Johnny Murtagh	0:57.58
2021	The Highway Rat	3	Ronan Whelan	Andy Oliver	0:58.28
2022	Manaccan	3	Stevie Donohoe	John Ryan	0:58.05
2023	Dun Na Sead	4	Oisin McSweeney	Daniel Murphy	0:58.25
2024	Ostraka	4	James Ryan	Daniel Murphy	0:58.60
2025	Spartan Arrow	5	Hollie Doyle	Archie Watson	0:58.57
2026	Washington Heights	6	Shane Gray	Kevin Ryan	0:58.77

== See also ==
- Horse racing in Ireland
- List of Irish flat horse races
