= Patrick J. Flynn =

Patrick J. Flynn is a successful race horse trainer. Among the winners that he has trained are:

Alalja, winner of:

- 1992 Debutante Stakes (Ireland)

Montelado, winner of:

- 1992 Champion Bumper
- 1993 Supreme Novices' Hurdle

Salmon Eile, winner of:

- 1993 Mooresbridge Stakes

Aries Girl, winner of:

- 1994 Champion INH Flat Race

Cheviot Amble

- 1994 Mooresbridge Stakes

Ger's Royal, winner of:

- 1996 Solonaway Stakes

Wandering Thoughts, winner of:

- 1996 Renaissance Stakes

French Ballerina, winner of:

- 1996 Diamond Stakes
- 1997 and 1998 Saval Beg Stakes
- 1998 Supreme Novices' Hurdle

Bahrain Storm, winner of:

- 2009 Galway Hurdle

She's Our Mark, winner of:

- 2007 Desmond Stakes
- 2009 Meld Stakes
- 2010 Give Thanks Stakes
