= Bayerisches Zuchtrennen =

Flat horse race in Germany

Bayerisches Zuchtrennen Grosser Dallmayr-Preis
- Class: Group 1
- Location: Munich Racecourse; Munich, Germany
- Inaugurated: 1866
- Race type: Flat / Thoroughbred
- Sponsor: Dallmayr
- Website: Munich

Race information
- Distance: 2,000 metres (1¼ miles)
- Surface: Turf
- Track: Left-handed
- Qualification: Three-years-old and up
- Weight: 55½ kg (3yo); 60 kg (4yo+); Allowances; 1½ kg for fillies and mares
- Purse: €155,000 (2022); 1st: €100,000

The Bayerisches Zuchtrennen is a Group 1 flat horse race in Germany open to thoroughbreds aged three years or older. It is run at Munich over a distance of 2,000 metres (about 1¼ miles), and it is scheduled to take place each year on the last Sunday in July.

== History ==
The event was established in 1866, and it was originally restricted to three-year-olds.

It was known as the Grosser Dreijährigen-Zuchtpreis from 1940 to 1944, and as the Bayerisches Derby in 1947.

The present race grading system was introduced in Germany in 1972, and the Bayerisches Zuchtrennen was initially classed at Group 3 level. It was opened to older horses and promoted to Group 2 in 1985. It was given Group 1 status in 1990.

The race has been sponsored by Dallmayr since 1996, and it is now run as the Grosser Dallmayr-Preis.

== Records ==
Most successful horse (2 wins):

- Turfkönig – 1989, 1990
- Soldier Hollow – 2005, 2007

Leading jockey since 1900 (7 wins):

- Fritz Drechsler – Grossmogul (1948), Levantos (1953), Liebeschor (1962), Daimyo (1967), Bacchus (1968), Boris (1972), Mirando (1973)

Leading trainer since 1940 (8 wins):

- Heinz Jentzsch – Daimyo (1967), Bacchus (1968), Boris (1972), Mirando (1973), Index (1981), Anno (1982), Lirung (1985), Zampano (1987)

Leading owner since 1900 (9 wins): (includes part ownership)

- August von Schmieder – Beowulf (1903), Herero (1907), Illo (1909), Pilgramsberg (1910), Don Cesar (1911), Flaminio (1912), Nachtschatten (1913), Drosselbart (1914), Persicus (1915)

== Winners since 1970 ==
| Year | Winner | Age | Jockey | Trainer | Owner | Time |
|---|---|---|---|---|---|---|
| 1970 | Segnes | 3 | Harald Ziese | W. Hessler | J. A. Eichmann | 2:32.00 |
| 1971 | Wanderu | 3 | Peter Alafi | Bruno Schütz | Gestüt Waldfried | 2:39.30 |
| 1972 | Boris | 3 | Fritz Drechsler | Heinz Jentzsch | Gestüt Schlenderhan | 2:32.00 |
| 1973 | Mirando | 3 | Fritz Drechsler | Heinz Jentzsch | Gestüt Fährhof | 2:34.70 |
| 1974 | Benedikt | 3 | Peter Alafi | Bruno Schütz | Stall Konstantin | 2:41.30 |
| 1975 | Gernegross | 3 | Dave Richardson | Arthur-Paul Schlaefke | Barbara von Stengel | 2:37.50 |
| 1976 | Oliver | 3 | Dave Richardson | Arthur-Paul Schlaefke | Koelble / Roemmers | 2:33.10 |
| 1977 | San Vicente | 3 | George Cadwaladr | Adolf Wöhler | Gestüt Fährhof | 2:38.60 |
| 1978 | Justus | 3 | Otto Gervai | Fritz Drechsler | Stall Burg Windeck | 2:32.50 |
| 1979 | Imperial Fling | 3 | Steve Cauthen | Harry Thomson Jones | Carlo Vittadini | 2:37.40 |
| 1980 | Senator | 3 | Detlef Gronendahl | Hein Bollow | H. Schulz-Botenwerfer | 2:39.50 |
| 1981 | Index | 3 | Manfred Hofer | Heinz Jentzsch | Gestüt Schlenderhan | 2:50.80 |
| 1982 | Anno | 3 | Siegmar Klein | Heinz Jentzsch | Gestüt Schlenderhan | 2:38.50 |
| 1983 | Tarsus | 3 | Heinz-Peter Ludewig | Peter Lautner | Stall Berbuk | 2:29.30 |
| 1984 | Daun | 3 | Pat Gilson | Theo Grieper | Gestüt Röttgen | 2:41.60 |
| 1985 | Lirung | 3 | Andrzej Tylicki | Heinz Jentzsch | Gestüt Fährhof | 2:04.30 |
| 1986 | Highland Chieftain | 3 | Willie Carson | John Dunlop | Derek Hunnisett | 2:05.30 |
| 1987 | Zampano | 3 | Andrzej Tylicki | Heinz Jentzsch | Gestüt Bona | 2:11.20 |
| 1988 | Shady Heights | 4 | Willie Carson | Robert Armstrong | George Tong | 2:02.89 |
| 1989 | Turfkönig | 3 | Billy Newnes | Uwe Ostmann | Gestüt Auenquelle | 2:05.39 |
| 1990 | Turfkönig | 4 | Georg Bocskai | Uwe Ostmann | Gestüt Auenquelle | 2:01.15 |
| 1991 | Kartajana | 4 | William Mongil | Alain de Royer-Dupré | HH Aga Khan IV | 2:07.57 |
| 1992 | Kooyonga | 4 | Warren O'Connor | Michael Kauntze | Mitsuo Haga | 2:05.80 |
| 1993 | Market Booster | 4 | Michael Kinane | Dermot Weld | Moyglare Stud Farm | 2:08.97 |
| 1994 | Vincenzo | 5 | Rikki Morse | Georg Ording | Stall Nordpol | 2:04.43 |
| 1995 | Germany | 4 | Frankie Dettori | Bruno Schütz | Jaber Abdullah | 2:05.20 |
| 1996 | Timarida | 4 | Johnny Murtagh | John Oxx | HH Aga Khan IV | 2:06.60 |
| 1997 | Oxalagu | 5 | Andrasch Starke | Bruno Schütz | Gestüt Rietberg | 2:04.60 |
| 1998 | Elle Danzig | 3 | Stanley Chin Kin-ming | Andreas Schütz | Gestüt Wittekindshof | 2:10.60 |
| 1999 | Tiger Hill | 4 | Andreas Suborics | Peter Schiergen | Georg von Ullmann | 2:04.70 |
| 2000 | Greek Dance | 5 | Johnny Murtagh | Sir Michael Stoute | Lord Weinstock | 2:12.40 |
| 2001 | Kutub | 4 | Frankie Dettori | Saeed bin Suroor | Godolphin | 2:09.00 |
| 2002 | Kaieteur | 3 | Pat Eddery | Brian Meehan | Susan McCarthy | 2:09.85 |
| 2003 | Ransom O'War | 3 | Stanley Chin | Erika Mäder | Stall Capricorn | 2:04.60 |
| 2004 | Intendant | 3 | Jiri Palik | Andrea Bertram | Ferdinand Leve | 2:04.27 |
| 2005 | Soldier Hollow | 5 | William Mongil | Peter Schiergen | Gestüt Park Wiedingen | 2:11.09 |
| 2006 | Lord of England | 3 | Andrasch Starke | Mario Hofer | Stall Lucky Owner | 2:14.46 |
| 2007 | Soldier Hollow | 7 | Andrasch Starke | Peter Schiergen | Gestüt Park Wiedingen | 2:09.26 |
| 2008 | Linngari | 6 | Ryan Moore | Sir Michael Stoute | Plersch / Walichnowski | 2:10.05 |
| 2009 | Pressing | 6 | Neil Callan | Michael Jarvis | Gary Tanaka | 2:11.27 |
| 2010 | Lady Jane Digby | 5 | Greg Fairley | Mark Johnston | Kirsten Rausing | 2:09.70 |
| 2011 | Durban Thunder | 5 | Terence Hellier | Torsten Mundry | Stall Tinsdal | 2:06.39 |
| 2012 | Pastorius | 3 | Andrasch Starke | Mario Hofer | Stall Antanando | 2:12.04 |
| 2013 | Neatico | 6 | Andrasch Starke | Peter Schiergen | Gestut Ittlingen | 2:04.07 |
| 2014 | Lucky Lion | 3 | Ioritz Mendizabal | Andreas Lowe | Gestut Winterhauch | 2:07.52 |
| 2015 | Guiliani | 4 | Filip Minařík | Jean-Pierre Carvalho | Stall Ullmann | 2:07:52 |
| 2016 | Elliptique | 5 | Frankie Dettori | André Fabre | Rothschild family | 2:07.83 |
| 2017 | Iquitos | 5 | Daniele Porcu | Hans-Jurgen Groschel | Stall Mulligan | 2:05.12 |
| 2018 | Benbatl | 4 | Oisin Murphy | Saeed bin Suroor | Godolphin | 2:06.78 |
| 2019 | Danceteria | 4 | Jamie Spencer | David Menuisier | Australian Bloodstock & Clive Washbourn | 2:14.96 |
| 2020 | Barney Roy | 6 | William Buick | Charlie Appleby | Godolphin | 2:09.00 |
| 2021 | Skalleti | 6 | Gerald Mosse | Jerome Reynier | Jean-Claude Seroul | 2:07.76 |
| 2022 | Sammarco | 3 | Rene Piechulek | Peter Schiergen | Gestut Park Wiedingen | 2:06.50 |
| 2023 | Nations Pride | 4 | William Buick | Charlie Appleby | Godolphin | 2:15.02 |
| 2024 | Calif | 5 | Adrie de Vries | Carlos and Yann Lerner | Victorious Racing | 2:06.88 |
| 2025 | Tornado Alert | 3 | Oisin Murphy | Saeed bin Suroor | Godolphin | 2:11.52 |
| 2026 | Hotazhell | 4 | Shane Foley | Jessica Harrington | Silverton Hill Partnership | 2:04.29 |

== Earlier winners ==
- 1890: Bettelliese
- 1900: Heribert / Minnesänger *
- 1901: Epirus
- 1902: Herz Ass
- 1903: Beowulf
- 1904: Girlamund
- 1905: Notgrim
- 1906: Elsterstein
- 1907: Herero
- 1908: Bajazzo
- 1909: Illo
- 1910: Pilgramsberg
- 1911: Don Cesar
- 1912: Flaminio
- 1913: Nachtschatten
- 1914: Drosselbart
- 1915: Persicus
- 1916: Der Blaue Vogel
- 1917: Rosengarten
- 1918: Eiffilo
- 1919: Eggenfelden
- 1920: Opanka
- 1921: Paukenschläger
- 1922: Casanova
- 1923: Bajuvare
- 1924: Eigilolf
- 1925: Goldelse
- 1926: Sigtuna
- 1927: Sphaira
- 1928: Arber
- 1929: Peter Sonnenschein
- 1930: Fortunatos
- 1931: Esto Vir
- 1932–39: no race
- 1940: Spieler
- 1941: Werber
- 1942: Ruhpoldinger
- 1943: Lotse
- 1944: Vinca
- 1945–46: no race
- 1947: Singlspieler
- 1948: Grossmogul
- 1949: Montevideo
- 1950: Waldspecht
- 1951: Algol
- 1952: Alke / Prodomo *
- 1953: Levantos
- 1954: Fabier
- 1955: Masetto
- 1956: Plutarch
- 1957: Menes
- 1958: Ozean
- 1959: Bismarck
- 1960: Ankerkette
- 1961: Rosenwirt
- 1962: Liebeschor
- 1963: Belos
- 1964: Illetlen
- 1965: Mioro
- 1966: Nem Igaz
- 1967: Daimyo
- 1968: Bacchus
- 1969: Traminer

* The 1900 and 1952 races were dead-heats and have joint winners.

== See also ==
- List of German flat horse races
