= Petite Ile =

Irish-bred Thoroughbred racehorse

- Sire: Ile de Bourbon
- Grandsire: Nijinsky
- Dam: Aces Full
- Damsire: Round Table
- Sex: Mare
- Foaled: 7 April 1986
- Country: Ireland
- Colour: Bay
- Breeder: David Nagle
- Owner: Jean-François Malle; Yoshio Asakawa
- Trainer: John Oxx; Edwin J "Eddie" Gregson
- Record: 14: 6-3-4

Major wins
- Phoenix Oaks Trial (1989); Irish St Leger (1989); Yerba Buena Handicap (1990); Golden Gate Fields Handicap (1990); Sunset Handicap (1990)

Petite Ile (7 April 1986 – November 2006) was an Irish-bred Thoroughbred racehorse and broodmare who won major races in both Europe and North America. After showing promise as a juvenile in Ireland in 1988, she emerged a top class staying filly in the following year, winning the Phoenix Oaks Trial and the Irish St Leger as well as finishing third in the Gallinule Stakes, Irish Oaks and the Yorkshire Oaks. In 1990 she was exported to race in the United States where she won the Golden Gate Fields Handicap and the Sunset Handicap and was controversially denied an Eclipse Award. After her retirement from racing she became a broodmare in Japan where she had some success as a dam of winners.

== Background ==
Petite Ile was a bay mare bred in Ireland by David Nagle. During her racing career she was owned by Jean-François Malle, the brother of the film director Louis Malle. She was initially sent into training with Dermot Weld but moved to the stable of John Oxx before her first race.

Her sire, Ile de Bourbon, was a top-class middle-distance performer best known for his win in the 1978 King George VI and Queen Elizabeth Stakes. As a breeding stallion he also sired Kahyasi and Ile de Chypre before being exported to Japan. Petite Ile's dam Aces Full was a great-granddaughter of the American broodmare Hildene (foaled 1938) whose other female-line descendants have included Hill Prince, First Landing and Cicada.

== Racing career ==
=== 1988: two-year-old season ===
Petite Ile was ridden in all of her European races by the Australian jockey Ron Quinton. he made her debut in a maiden race over seven furlongs at Phoenix Park Racecourse in October in which she started at odds of 13/2 and finished second to the Dermot Weld-trained Topper Up. Later that month she started favourite against twenty opponents for a minor race at Leopardstown and recorded her first success, taking the lead a furlong out and winning by one and a half lengths.

=== 1989: three-year-old season ===
Petite Ile did not run as a three-year-old until 13 May when she finished third to Blasted Heath in a Listed race at Leopardstown. Two weeks later she was tested against male opposition in the Gallinule Stakes and finished third again, beaten one and a half lengths and a length by Porter Rhodes and the Derrinstown Stud Derby Trial winner Phantom Breeze. In June the filly was stepped up in distance for the Listed Oaks Trial over eleven furlong at Phoenix Park. Starting the 2/1 second choice in a seven-runner field she stayed on strongly in the last quarter mile and won by a head from Kostroma.

For the remainder of 1989, Petite Ile was campaigned exclusively in Group One races, starting with the Irish Oaks at the Curragh in July. Starting at 14/1 in a five-runner field she made steady progress in the straight to finish third behind Alydaress and The Oaks winner Aliysa, beaten less than a length. In August she was sent to England for the Yorkshire Oaks but looked somewhat outpaced on the good to firm ground and finished third for the fourth time in five races as she came home a length and a half and a head behind Roseate Tern and Alydaress.

The ground was much softer when Petite Ile took on nine opponents in the Irish St Leger over fourteen furlong at the Curragh on 23 September. She was made the 3/1 favourite ahead of Phantom Breeze and the British challengers Lazaz (second in the Ormonde Stakes) and Daarkom (Ebor Handicap). The field was not a strong one: apart from Phantom Breeze the only Group race winner in the line-up was Beyond The Lake who started a 20/1 outsider despite his success in the Royal Whip Stakes. Petite Ile was restrained by Quinton in the early stages and turned into the straight in fifth place behind the Upper Strata. First Lazaz, and then Tyrone Bridge went to the front in the straight but the favourite made "smooth progress" to join Tyrone Bridge inside the final furlong. The pair drew away from their rivals in a strongly contested finish, with Petite Ile prevailing by a short head.

Petite Ile was put up for auction at Tattersalls in December 1989 but failed to reach her reserve price and remained in Malle's ownership.

=== 1990: four-year-old season ===
For the 1990 season Petite Ile was sent to race in North America was she was trained by Eddie Gregson and ridden in most of her races by Corey Black. Although Gregson was based in Southern California, the filly did most of her racing at Golden Gate Fields near San Francisco, which involved a nine-hour journey. Gregson reported that the filly adapted unusually quickly to American racing.

She began her third campaign by finishing second to Sweet Roberta in the Grade III Countess Fager Handicap over nine furlongs on 22 April. Two weeks later she recorded her first win in the United States when she won the ungraded Yerba Buena Handicap from Double Wedge (Gamely Stakes) and Brown Bess (1989 American Champion Female Turf Horse). On 16 June Petite Ile was matched against male opposition in the Grade II Golden Gate Handicap and won again, beating the French import Valdali into second place with Pleasant Variety in third. Gregson said that the winner was "some filly" but also explained that she could be temperamental, commenting "She'll bite the hell out of you. She takes her pet nips, and she's gotten me and just about everybody else in the barn". In July the filly moved south and again took on male opponents when she contested the Grade II Sunset Handicap over one and a half miles at Hollywood Park Racetrack. She recorded her third consecutive win as she led from the start and came home half a length in front of the Hollywood Derby winner Live The Dream. After the race Corey Black explained "she jumped well and then she was just loafing out there. She had her ears pricked all the way. I started picking it up about the half-mile pole and she got into the bit when she felt Live The Dream coming up from behind. When I chirped to her in the middle of the turn, she sailed on away. I thought she would win by three or four, but Live The Dream held on tough. She really ran great".

After a break of over three months, due to a leg injury sustained in the Sunset, Petite Ile returned in the Yellow Ribbon Stakes at Santa Anita Park on 4 November. She took the lead on the far turn but was overtaken in the closing stages and was beaten a length into second place by the 56/1 outsider Plenty of Grace. Both Black and Gregson admitted that the filly had been taken to the front sooner than intended to avoid "traffic problems". Petite Ile ended her racing career in the Japan Cup at Tokyo Racecourse on 24 November 1990. She reached the final turn in third place but dropped back in the straight and finished twelfth of the fifteen runners behind the Australian Better Loosen Up. Before the race she had been acquired by the Japanese owner Yoshio Asakawa.

Petite Ile was widely expected to be named American Champion Female Turf Horse at the Eclipse Awards for 1990 but lost out to Laugh and Be Merry despite receiving more votes. According to the Daily Racing Form the result was due to a quirk of the bloc voting system which had produced "the worst of all scenarios".

== Breeding record ==
At the end of her racing career Petite Ile was retired to become a broodmare in Japan. She produced at least ten foals and six winners between 1992 and 2004:

- Kyowa Eight, a bay colt (later gelded), foaled in 1992, sired by Alysheba. Failed to win in ten races.
- Kyowa Petite, bay filly, 1993, by Tosho Boy. Failed to win in seven races.
- Kyowa Rarity, chestnut filly, 1994, by Polish Navy. Failed to win in three races.
- Asuka Huou, bay colt, 1995, by Criminal Type. Won one race.
- Bu O, brown colt, 1996, by Tony Bin. Won five races.
- Asaka Petite, bay filly, 1998, by Brian's Time. Won one race.
- Kyowa Monroe, brown filly, 1999, by Dancing Brave. Won one race.
- Kyowa Ocean, bay filly, 2000, by Commander in Chief. Won five races.
- Alley Oop, bay filly, 2003, by Admire Vega. Failed to win in two races.
- Shoutline, brown colt, 2004, by Squirtle Squirt. Won six races.

Petite Ile died in November 2006 in Japan.

== Pedigree ==
Pedigree of Petite Ile (IRE), bay mare, 1986
Sire Ile de Bourbon (USA) 1975	Nijinsky (CAN); 1967	Northern Dancer	Nearctic
Sire Ile de Bourbon (USA) 1975	Nijinsky (CAN); 1967	Northern Dancer	Natalma
Sire Ile de Bourbon (USA) 1975	Nijinsky (CAN); 1967	Flaming Page	Bull Page
Sire Ile de Bourbon (USA) 1975	Nijinsky (CAN); 1967	Flaming Page	Flaring Top
Sire Ile de Bourbon (USA) 1975	Roseliere (FR); 1965	Misti	Medium
Sire Ile de Bourbon (USA) 1975	Roseliere (FR); 1965	Misti	Mist
Sire Ile de Bourbon (USA) 1975	Roseliere (FR); 1965	Peace Rose	Fastnet Rock
Sire Ile de Bourbon (USA) 1975	Roseliere (FR); 1965	Peace Rose	La Paix
Dam Aces Full (USA) 1975	Round Table (USA); 1954	Princequillo	Prince Rose
Dam Aces Full (USA) 1975	Round Table (USA); 1954	Princequillo	Cosquilla
Dam Aces Full (USA) 1975	Round Table (USA); 1954	Knights Daughter	Sir Cosmo
Dam Aces Full (USA) 1975	Round Table (USA); 1954	Knights Daughter	Feola
Dam Aces Full (USA) 1975	Bold Experience (USA); 1962	Bold Ruler	Nasrullah
Dam Aces Full (USA) 1975	Bold Experience (USA); 1962	Bold Ruler	Miss Disco
Dam Aces Full (USA) 1975	Bold Experience (USA); 1962	First Flush	Flushing
Dam Aces Full (USA) 1975	Bold Experience (USA); 1962	First Flush	Hildene (Family 9-b)
