= Brownstown Stakes =

Horse race in Ireland

- Class: Group 3
- Location: Fairyhouse; County Meath, Ireland
- Race type: Flat / Thoroughbred
- Sponsor: Irish Stallion Farms
- Website: Fairyhouse

Race information
- Distance: 7f (1,408 metres)
- Surface: Turf
- Track: Right-handed
- Qualification: Three-years-old and up fillies and mares
- Weight: 9 st 0 lb (3yo); 9 st 8 lb (4yo+); Penalties; 5 lb for Group 1 or Group 2 winners * 3 lb for Group 3 winners * * since July 1 last year
- Purse: €61,100 (2022); 1st: €38,350

Brownstown Stakes
2026
Duckadilly	Phenomenal Filly	Nancy

Previous years
2025
Vera's Secret	Dance Night Andday	Chantez
2024
Jancis	Bluedrum	Special Wan
2023
Zarinsk	Cigamia	American Sonja
2022
Marbling	Nectaris	Surrounding
2021
Pearls Galore	Valeria Messalina	Bipartisanship

2020-2011
2020
Valeria Messalina	Unforgetable	Soul Search
2019
Surrounding	Perfection	Indian Blessing
2018
Xenobia	Could It Be Love	Damselfly
2017
Realtra	Golden Stunner	Asking
2016
Queen Catrine	Most Beautiful	Molly Dolly
2015
Ainippe	Majestic Queen	Queen Nefertiti
2014
Tobann	Majestic Queen	Califante
2013
Fiesolana	Along Came Casey	Snow Queen
2012
Marvada	Caprella	After
2011
Emulous	Claiomh Solais	Rose Bonheur

2010-2001
2010
Berg Bahn	Velvet Flicker	Miss Gorica
2009
Glowing	Luminous Eyes	Kalidaha
2008
Cheyenne Star	Age Of Chivalry	Dimenticata
2007
Redstone Dancer	She's Our Mark	Modeeroch
2006
Spinning Queen	Wake Up Maggie	Modeeroch
2005
Miss Sally	Lock And Key	Alexander Icequeen
2004
Tropical Lady	Majestic Desert	Red Feather
2003
Perfect Touch	Irresistible	Dixie Evans
2002
Dress To Thrill	Chiming	Dame Portia
2001
Siringas	Saying Grace	Toroca

2000-1991
2000
Kermiyana	Sand Partridge	Topsy Morning
1999
Castle Quest	Crystal Downs	Takariya
1998
Mora	Mempari	Hasanat
1997
Inchacooley	Khatara	Via Verbano
1996
Hagwah	Proud Titania	Charlock
1995
Timarida	Anemone Garden	Wild Bluebell
1994
Kayfa	Hamseh	Sharadiya
1993
Eurostorm	Special Pageant	Dashing Colours
1992
Via Borghese	Gdansk's Honour	Darayna
1991
Idle Affair	Blue Daisy	You Know The Rules

1990-1988
1990
Kostroma	Arpero	Star Of The Future
1989
Awayed	Upward Trend	Frendly Persuasion
1988
Llyn Gwynant	Host Of Angels	Lady Eileen

The Brownstown Stakes is a Group 3 flat horse race in Ireland open to thoroughbred fillies and mares aged three years or older. It is run at Fairyhouse over a distance of 7 furlongs (1,408 metres), and it is scheduled to take place each year in late June or early July.

== History ==
The event was formerly held at Leopardstown, and for a period it was classed at Listed level. It used to be run over a distance of 1 mile.

The race was promoted to Group 3 status and cut to 7 furlongs in 2003. It was transferred to Fairyhouse in 2009.

The Brownstown Stakes was run at Naas in 2012, after being abandoned twice at Fairyhouse due to a waterlogged course.

== Records ==
Most successful horse:

- no horse has won this race more than once since 1987

Leading jockey since 1987 (4 wins):

- Pat Smullen – Mora (1998), Dress to Thrill (2002), Perfect Touch (2003), Emulous (2011)
- Kevin Manning - Castle Quest (1999), Siringas (2001), Tropical Lady (2004), Tobann (2014)

Leading trainer since 1987 (5 wins):

- Ger Lyons - Berg Bahn (2010), Ainippe (2015), Queen Catrine (2016), Marbling (2022), Zarinksk (2023)

== Winners since 1987 ==
Year	Winner	Age	Jockey	Trainer	Time
1987	Just Class	3	John Lowe	Steve Norton
1988	Llyn Gwynant	3	Willie Carson	John Dunlop	1:39.00
1989	Awayed	3	Declan Gillespie	Peter Walwyn	1:38.80
1990	Kostroma	4	Stephen Craine	Tommy Stack	1:38.90
1991	Idle Affair	3	Michael Kinane	Ted Curtin	1:44.00
1992	Via Borghese	3	Lester Piggott	Vincent O'Brien	1:42.40
1993	Eurostorm	3	Pat Gilson	Con Collins	1:40.70
1994	Kayfa	5	Michael Kinane	Dermot Weld	1:38.90
1995	Timarida	3	Johnny Murtagh	John Oxx	1:39.70
1996	Hagwah	4	Willie Ryan	Ben Hanbury	1:40.50
1997	Inchacooley	5	Eddie Ahern	Martin Brassil	1:46.50
1998	Mora	3	Pat Smullen	John Oxx	1:44.40
1999	Castle Quest	3	Kevin Manning	Jim Bolger	1:39.00
2000	Kermiyana	3	Johnny Murtagh	John Oxx	1:41.20
2001	Siringas	3	Kevin Manning	Jim Bolger	1:39.30
2002	Dress to Thrill	3	Pat Smullen	Dermot Weld	1:40.40
2003	Perfect Touch	4	Pat Smullen	Dermot Weld	1:30.50
2004	Tropical Lady	4	Kevin Manning	Jim Bolger	1:29.20
2005	Miss Sally	3	Fran Berry	Michael Halford	1:26.20
2006	Spinning Queen	3	Michael Hills	Barry Hills	1:26.50
2007	Redstone Dancer	5	Pat Shanahan	Sheena Collins	1:32.56
2008	Cheyenne Star	5	Seamie Heffernan	Frances Crowley	1:27.30
2009	Glowing	4	Fran Berry	Charles O'Brien	1:25.91
2010	Berg Bahn	3	Keagan Latham	Ger Lyons	1:28.15
2011	Emulous	4	Pat Smullen	Dermot Weld	1:29.53
2012	Marvada (Note: The 2012 race was run at Naas)	4	Shane Foley	Ken Condon	1:32.96
2013	Fiesolana	4	Billy Lee	Willie McCreery	1:29.17
2014	Tobann	4	Kevin Manning	Jim Bolger	1:28.44
2015	Ainippe	3	Colin Keane	Ger Lyons	1:27.12
2016	Queen Catrine	5	Gary Carroll	Ger Lyons	1:27.55
2017	Realtra	5	Colin Keane	Roger Varian	1:28.40
2018	Xenobia	4	Chris Hayes	Bill Farrell	1:27.06
2019	Surrounding	6	Ronan Whelan	Michael Halford	1:27.72
2020	Valeria Messalina (Note: The 2020 race was run at Cork due to the COVID-19 pandemic in the Republic of Ireland)	3	Shane Foley	Jessica Harrington	1:23.72
2021	Pearls Galore	4	Billy Lee	Paddy Twomey	1:26.79
2022	Marbling	5	Gary Carroll	Ger Lyons	1:29.27
2023	Zarinsk	3	Colin Keane	Ger Lyons	1:26.99
2024	Jancis (Note: The 2024 race was run at Leopardstown)	3	Billy Lee	Willie McCreery	1:28.47
2025	Vera's Secret (Note: The 2025 race was run at Leopardstown)	6	Seamie Heffernan	John Feane	1:25.44
2026	Duckadilly (Note: The 2026 race was run at Leopardstown)	5	Scott McCullagh	Daniel McLoughlin	1:28.85

== See also ==
- List of Irish flat horse races
