= Dundalk Stadium =

Horse and greyhound racing venue in County Louth, Ireland

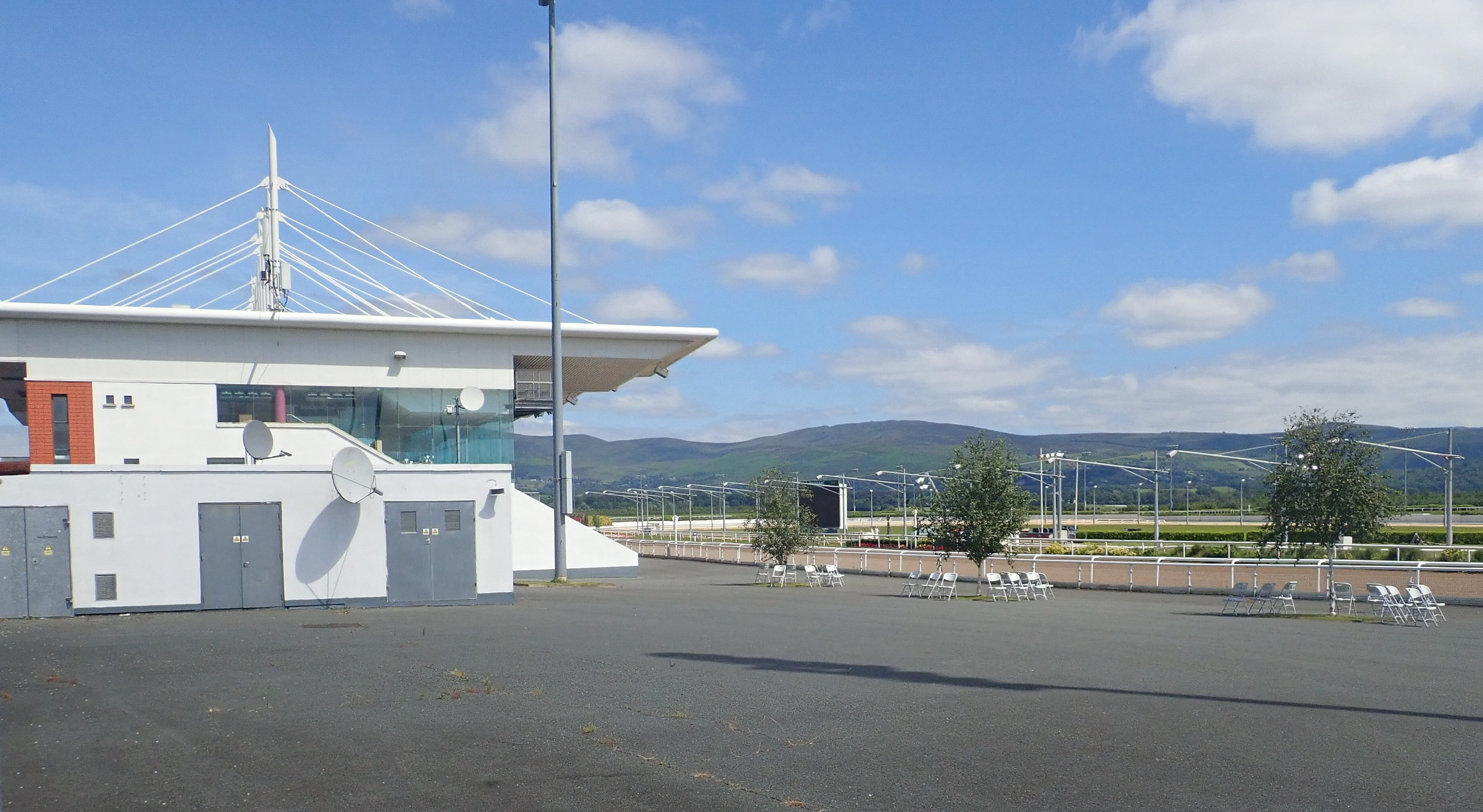
- Interactive map of Dundalk Stadium
- Location: Racecourse Road, Dundalk, County Louth, Ireland
- Coordinates: 54.020896°N 6.383218°W
- Date opened: 2003
- Race type: horse & greyhound racing

Dundalk Stadium is a horse and greyhound racing venue in Ireland. It is located to the north of Dundalk in County Louth.

The total build cost €35million with a modern grandstand, elevated viewing areas, restaurant and bars.

== Horse racing ==
The Dundalk all-weather horse track to go alongside the new greyhound track that had opened earlier, officially opened on 26 August 2007 costing a further €24million.

The course is a floodlit 1¼ mile left-handed oval, and races are run on an all-weather Polytrack surface.

A turf racecourse at Dundalk, which was mainly used for National Hunt events, was closed in 2001. The present all-weather track, reserved for flat races, was opened in August 2007. The highest class horse races to be run at the venue are the Diamond Stakes, which was promoted from Listed to Group 3 status in 2009, and the Mercury Stakes which was upgraded to Group 3 status in 2018.

=== Notable races ===
Month	DOW	Race Name	Type	Grade	Distance	Age/Sex
March	Friday	Patton Stakes	A W Flat	Listed	1m	3yo
October	Friday	Diamond Stakes	A W Flat	Group 3	1m 2f 150y	3yo +
October	Friday	Mercury Stakes	A W Flat	Group 3	5f	2yo +

== Greyhound racing ==
In 1999 the Dundalk Race Company PLC and Dundealgan Greyhound Racing Company Limited merged to form Dundalk Racing (1999) Ltd. This would allow a new horse racing circuit to be built over the existing turf course and a greyhound track inside the main course. The previous Dundalk Ramparts Greyhound Stadium was closed on 20 November 2000 during which time the horse racecourse was undergoing major changes and despite resistance from the Horseracing Authority both sides were encouraged by the success of Paschal Taggart's Shelbourne Park venture.

The Irish racing scene was experiencing some promising growth and Dundalk officially opened their new Dundalk Stadium on 29 November 2003 to the cost of €11 million. The minister for sport John O'Donoghue conducted the opening honours and thanks were given by CEO Jim Martin to Paschal Taggart chairman of the Bord na gCon/Irish Greyhound Board for their help.

The track measures 550 yards in circumference providing a galloping circuit as opposed to the previous tight circuit of 440 yards. The kennels are located in a renovated building that was formerly the Tote for the racecourse but plans for a new eighty runner complex are in motion.

=== Competitions ===
The Dundalk International is held annually. It is a prestigious invitation event held for Ireland's leading greyhounds and also attracts some of the UK's top hounds. The event is one of the richest one-off races in Ireland (€20,000 in 2016) and is an integral part of the Irish greyhound racing calendar after being inaugurated in 1968. The Irish Sprint Cup (formerly the Irish National Cup) arrived at the track in 2004.

- Dundalk International
- Irish Sprint Cup

=== Track records ===
Current

Yards	Greyhound	Time	Date	Notes
350	Blame the Game	18.46	15 November 2019	
400	Broadstrand Syd	20.57	20 July 2024	Irish Sprint Cup heats
400 hurdles	Distant Legend	21.90	15 August 2009	
525	Swanley Chick	28.14	1 August 2020	
550	Droopys Verve	29.39	12 July 2018	
575	Vaguely Noble	30.92	12 July 2016	
600	Boleys Fella	32.30	12 July 2019	
620	Dromana Blue	33.51	5 December 2007	
670	Prince Monalulu	36.47	4 February 2005	
900	Ballymac Bonnie	49.82	12 July 2016	

Previous

Yards	Greyhound	Time	Date	Notes
350	Mulcair Jo	18.71	12 July 2006	
350	Kildallon Ranger	18.49	12 July 2012	
360	Copeland Ranger	19.43	15 July 2004	
360	Lauragh Empire	19.43	13 August 2004	
360	Wellington	19.12	30 October 2004	
400	Mabels Dilemma	21.11	15 August 2005	Irish Sprint Cup Final
400	Droopys Rodger	21.06	21 July 2006	
400	Ciaras Castle	20.96	23 March 2007	
400	Gingko	20.95	21 July 2007	
400	Heisman	20.94	28 July 2017	Irish Sprint Cup second round
400	Droopys Steel	20.81	3 August 2018	Irish Sprint Cup third round
400	Grangeview Ten	20.75	8 August 2020	Irish Sprint Cup semi final
400	Brodys Magic	20.73	8 August 2020	Irish Sprint Cup semi final
410	Geldrops Touch	21.55	26 February 2005	
525	Graigues Dynasty	28.62	1 April 2004	
525	Killeigh Grand	28.53	15 October 2004	
525	Phoenix Paddy	28.46	3 November 2006	
525	Open Door	28.39	12 July 2007	
525	Ballymac Tipp	28.31	20 September 2010	
525	Burnt Beans	28.17	20 May 2017	
550	Hes The Bizz	29.88	5 February 2004	
550	Holborn Major	29.85	12 July 2004	
550	Like A Shot	29.81	25 February 2005	
550	Droopys Electric	29.73	12 July 2006	Dundalk International
550	Si Senor	29.47	12 July 2007	
550	Droopys Roddick	29.40	12 July 2016	
575	Lunar Boy	31.45	4 September 2004	
575	Dromana Blue	31.14	5 December 2007	
575	Stateside Troika	31.09	14 December 2013	
600	Mobile Dubh	32.90	4 March 2004	
600	Grandad Pat	32.84	19 November 2005	
600	Fairly Smart	32.82	21 October 2006	
600	Ballyhill Beauty	32.59	23 March 2009	
600	Ballycanal Chief	32.57	15 August 2010	
620	Air Force Honcho	33.94	22 April 2004	
620	Westmead Force	33.93	3 July 2005	
620	Martinstown Lass	33.93	15 August 2005	
620	Martinstown Lass	33.86	13 January 2006	
620	Winetavern Oscar	33.72	4 February 2006	
900	Shelbourne Kay	50.61	12 November 2005	
900	Hulkster	50.46	12 July 2006	
900	Shelbourne Kay	50.14	15 August 2006	
900	Flying Winner	49.99	12 July 2008	
910	Air Force Honcho	51.08	20 November 2004	
960	Beaming Surprise	54.62	22 May 2004	
400 H	Distant Legend	21.90	15 August 2009	
