= Brian Boru (horse) =

British-bred Thoroughbred racehorse

- Sire: Sadler's Wells
- Grandsire: Northern Dancer
- Dam: Eva Luna (USA)
- Damsire: Alleged
- Sex: Stallion
- Foaled: 16 March 2000
- Country: United Kingdom
- Colour: Bay
- Breeder: Juddmonte Farms
- Owner: Susan Magnier
- Trainer: Aidan O'Brien
- Record: 18: 4-4-3
- Earnings: £677,671

Major wins
- Racing Post Trophy (2002); St. Leger Stakes (2003)

Brian Boru (foaled 16 March 2000) is a retired Thoroughbred racehorse and active sire who was bred in Britain but was trained in Ireland. In a career which lasted from June 2002 until December 2004, he ran eighteen times and won four races. Brian Boru was made favourite for The Derby after winning the Racing Post Trophy in 2002. In September 2003 he recorded his most important win when winning the St Leger at Doncaster.

== Background ==
Brian Boru is a dark bay horse with a narrow white blaze bred by Juddmonte Farms. He was sired by the thirteen time Leading sire in Great Britain and Ireland Sadler's Wells out of the Park Hill Stakes winner Eva Luna (USA). Eva Luna later produced Sea Moon, who won the Great Voltigeur Stakes and finished second in the Breeders' Cup Turf. She was also the dam of Soviet Moon, who in turn produced the Epsom Derby winner Workforce. Before his racing career began, Brian Boru was acquired by the Coolmore organisation. He was sent into training with Aidan O'Brien at Ballydoyle and raced in the colours of Susan Magnier, the wife of John Magnier.

== Racing career ==
=== 2002: two-year-old season ===
Brian Boru began his racing career in a seven furlong maiden race at the Curragh on 28 June 2002. Ridden by Mick Kinane he started slowly but took the lead a furlong from the finish and won by a neck from the filly Evelyn One. Brian Boru was immediately moved up to Group Two class for the Beresford Stakes for which he started 2/1 favourite. He took the lead in the straight but was caught in the closing stages and beaten a head by the future Irish Derby winner Alamshar. On his final start of the year, Brian Boru was sent to England to contest the Group One Racing Post Trophy at Doncaster on 26 October. Brian Boru was made 11/8 favourite and was ridden by Kevin Darley. Darley tracked the leaders into the straight but struggled to obtain a clear run until the final furlong. In the closing stages Brian Boru produced a "storming late run" to take the lead and won by one and a quarter lengths from his stable companion Powerscourt. Following the race he was made favourite for the following year's Epsom Derby.

=== 2003: three-year-old season ===
Brian Boru began his three-year-old season in the Derrinstown Stud Derby Trial at Leopardstown on 11 May in which he finished third behind Alamshar and The Great Gatsby. In The Derby on 7 June, Brian Boru started the 9/2 third favourite in a field of twenty runners. He made no impression in the race and finished sixteenth behind Kris Kin, The Great Gatsby and Alamshar. Three weeks later, Brian Boru finished fourth of the nine runners behind Alamshar and Dalakhani in the Irish Derby. In August, Brian Boru took the lead in the straight in the Great Voltigeur Stakes at York but was caught inside the final furlong and beaten a neck by Powerscourt.

On 13 September Brian Boru started 5/4 favourite for the St Leger at Doncaster against eleven opponents. Ridden by Jamie Spencer, he was held up in the early stages before making his challenge in the straight and taking the lead a furlong from the finish. He "kept on well" in the closing stages to win by one and a quarter lengths from High Accolade with Phoenix Reach in third. Brough Scott writing in the Telegraph, described the race as "ruthlessly run" and the finish as being "admirably committed". Spencer dedicated the win to his friend Kieran Kelly, a National Hunt jockey who had been killed in an accident at Kilbeggan Racecourse. In October, Brian Boru was sent to Canada to contest the Canadian International Stakes at Woodbine Racetrack. He started 5/4 favourite, but finished third of the ten runners to Phoenix Reach.

=== 2004: four-year-old season ===
On his first start as a four-year-old, Brian Boru won the Listed Alleged Stakes at Leopardstown, beating Napper Tandy by three quarters of a length. The rest of Brian Boru's season was disappointing as he failed to win in eight subsequent races. His best efforts came when finishing second in the Irish St. Leger (to Vinnie Roe) and the Prix Kergorlay and third (to Sulamani) in the Canadian International Stakes.

== Stud career ==
Brian Boru was retired to stand at the Coolmore Stud, where he is marketed as a "dual-purpose" sire. He has had little success with his flat racers but has shown promise as a National Hunt stallion, siring the useful steeplechaser Bold Sir Brian.

== Pedigree ==
Pedigree of Brian Boru (GB), bay stallion 2000
Sire Sadler's Wells	Northern Dancer	Nearctic	Nearco
Sire Sadler's Wells	Northern Dancer	Nearctic	Lady Angela
Sire Sadler's Wells	Northern Dancer	Natalma	Native Dancer
Sire Sadler's Wells	Northern Dancer	Natalma	Almahmoud
Sire Sadler's Wells	Fairy Bridge	Bold Reason	Hail To Reason
Sire Sadler's Wells	Fairy Bridge	Bold Reason	Lalun
Sire Sadler's Wells	Fairy Bridge	Special	Forli
Sire Sadler's Wells	Fairy Bridge	Special	Thong
Dam Eva Luna	Alleged	Hoist the Flag	Tom Rolfe
Dam Eva Luna	Alleged	Hoist the Flag	Wavy Navy
Dam Eva Luna	Alleged	Princess Pout	Prince John
Dam Eva Luna	Alleged	Princess Pout	Determined Lady
Dam Eva Luna	Media Luna	Star Appeal	Appiani
Dam Eva Luna	Media Luna	Star Appeal	Sterna
Dam Eva Luna	Media Luna	Sounion	Vimy
Dam Eva Luna	Media Luna	Sounion	Esquire Girl (Family 14-c)
