= Germany (horse) =

American-bred Thoroughbred racehorse

- Sire: Trempolino
- Grandsire: Sharpen Up
- Dam: Inca Princess
- Damsire: Big Spruce
- Sex: Stallion
- Foaled: 9 May 1991
- Died: December 2013 (aged 22)
- Country: United States
- Colour: Bay
- Breeder: Curative Ltd (KY)
- Owner: Jaber Abdullah
- Trainer: Bruno Schütz
- Record: 17: 9-5-1
- Earnings: €628,940 (equivalent)

Major wins
- Bayerisches Zuchtrennen (1995); Grosser Preis von Baden (1995)

Awards
- Timeform rating: 124

Germany (9 May 1991 – December 2013) was a German Thoroughbred racehorse who won 9 of his 17 starts including 2 Group 1's in which he was ridden Frankie Dettori.

== Background ==
Germany was a bay horse with black socks sired by 1987 the Prix de l'Arc de Triomphe winner Trempolino, who was bred in United States and bought as a yearling for $70,000 by the British trainer Ben Hanbury on behalf of Jaber Abdullah at the 1992 Keeneland September sales. He was trained by Bruno Schütz and was raced almost all of his career in Germany with an exception of the 1995 British Champion Stakes in which he failed to give his running on the good to firm ground.

== Racing career ==
Germany raced only 4 times in his first 2 seasons and acquired his black type as a 2yo when winning the Kronimus-Rennen listed race in 1993 over a distance of 7 furlongs but was forced into a long absence having sustained a fracture in his off-fore.

He made his reappearance at four year old and was campaigned over middle-distance races winning his first 2 starts in listed and group 3 events in the 1995 spring before adding couple more top level wins in the summer including the Group 1's Bayerisches Zuchtrennen and Grosser Preis von Baden, in the latter beating by 8 lengths in 3rd spot the Irish group performer Right Win who had shown great form in previous 2 seasons winning the Group 2 Gallinule Stakes when ridden by jockey Lester Piggott and Group 1 Gran Premio d'Italia. Germany's last and 8th start of the season was in the British Champion Stakes where after a long campaign and standard of opposition better than on home soil he could not finish in the placings.

== Pedigree ==
Pedigree of Germany (USA), bay horse, 1991
| Sire Trempolino (USA) 1984 | Sharpen Up (GB); 1969 | Atan (USA); 1961 | Native Dancer (USA) 1950 |
| Sire Trempolino (USA) 1984 | Sharpen Up (GB); 1969 | Atan (USA); 1961 | Mixed Marriage (GB) 1952 |
| Sire Trempolino (USA) 1984 | Sharpen Up (GB); 1969 | Rocchetta (GB); 1961 | Rockefella (GB) 1941 |
| Sire Trempolino (USA) 1984 | Sharpen Up (GB); 1969 | Rocchetta (GB); 1961 | Chambiges (FR) 1949 |
| Sire Trempolino (USA) 1984 | Trephine (FR); 1977 | Viceregal (CAN); 1966 | Northern Dancer (CAN) 1961 |
| Sire Trempolino (USA) 1984 | Trephine (FR); 1977 | Viceregal (CAN); 1966 | Victoria Regina (CAN) 1958 |
| Sire Trempolino (USA) 1984 | Trephine (FR); 1977 | Quiriquina (FR); 1966 | Molvedo (ITY) 1958 |
| Sire Trempolino (USA) 1984 | Trephine (FR); 1977 | Quiriquina (FR); 1966 | La Chaussee (FR) 1961 |
| Dam Inca Princess (USA) 1983 | Big Spruce (USA); 1969 | Herbager (FR); 1956 | Vandale (FR) 1943 |
| Dam Inca Princess (USA) 1983 | Big Spruce (USA); 1969 | Herbager (FR); 1956 | Flagette (FR) 1951 |
| Dam Inca Princess (USA) 1983 | Big Spruce (USA); 1969 | Silver Sari (USA); 1961 | Prince John (USA) 1953 |
| Dam Inca Princess (USA) 1983 | Big Spruce (USA); 1969 | Silver Sari (USA); 1961 | Golden Sari (USA) 1956 |
| Dam Inca Princess (USA) 1983 | Inca Queen (USA); 1968 | Hail To Reason (USA); 1958 | Turn-To (USA) 1951 |
| Dam Inca Princess (USA) 1983 | Inca Queen (USA); 1968 | Hail To Reason (USA); 1958 | Nothirdchance (USA) 1948 |
| Dam Inca Princess (USA) 1983 | Inca Queen (USA); 1968 | Silver Spoon (USA); 1956 | Citation (USA) 1945 |
| Dam Inca Princess (USA) 1983 | Inca Queen (USA); 1968 | Silver Spoon (USA); 1956 | Silver Fog (USA) 1944 |
