= Johnny Murtagh =

Irish horse racing trainer and former jockey

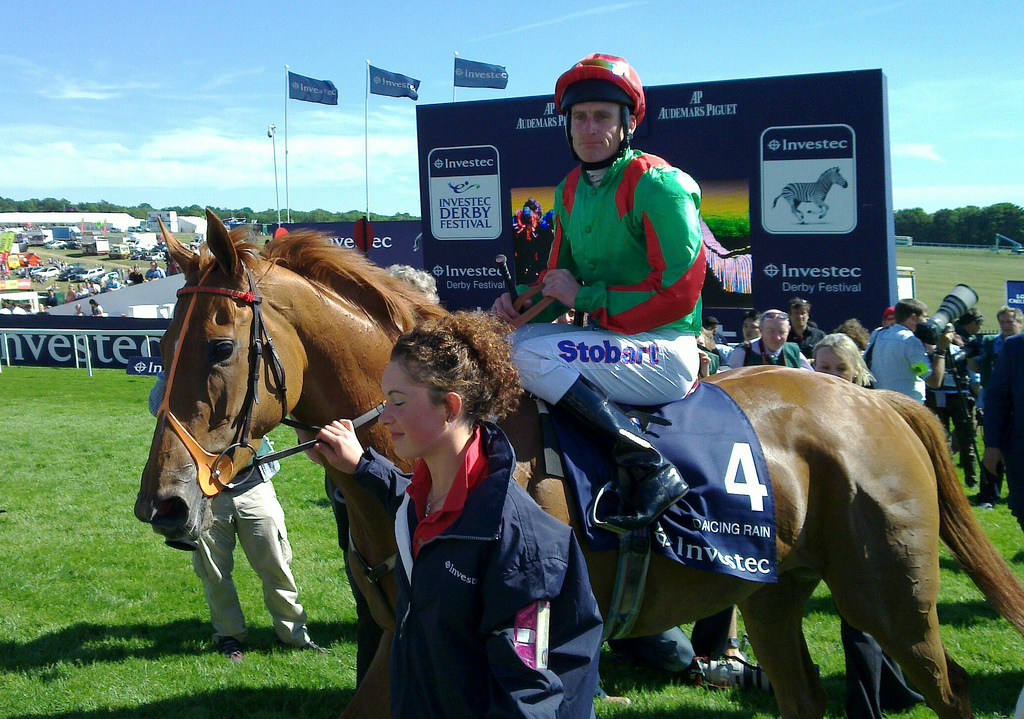
- Murtagh after winning the 2011 Epsom Oaks on Dancing Rain

Personal information
- Born: 14 May 1970 (age 56) Navan, County Meath, Ireland
- Occupation: Jockey / trainer

Horse racing career
- Sport: Horse racing

Significant horses
- Sinndar, Kalanisi, Choisir, Soviet Song, Henrythenavigator, Yeats, Fame and Glory, Dancing Rain

1000 Guineas (0)

2000 Guineas (2)
2002
Rock of Gibraltar	Hawk Wing	Redback
2008
Henrythenavigator	New Approach	Stubbs Art

Derby (3)
2000
Sinndar	Sakhee	Beat Hollow
2002
High Chaparral	Hawk Wing	Moon Ballad
2005
Motivator	Walk in the Park	Dubawi

Oaks (1)
2011
Dancing Rain	Wonder of Wonders	Izzi Top

St Leger (0)

Johnny Murtagh (born 14 May 1970) is an Irish flat racing trainer and former jockey from Bohermeen, near Navan, Kells, County Meath. As a jockey he won many of the major flat races in Europe, including all the Irish Classics, all the Group 1 races at Royal Ascot, The Derby, the King George VI and Queen Elizabeth Diamond Stakes and Europe's biggest flat race, the Prix de l'Arc de Triomphe. He was also a five-time Irish flat racing Champion Jockey. As a trainer, based at stables near Kildare, he has saddled a winner at Royal Ascot and an Irish Classic winner.

== Background ==
Murtagh was born in Navan, County Meath. He was a keen amateur boxer as a young boy and was once the Irish boys' under-14 champion. He also came close to joining Blackburn Rovers' youth football team.

At a boxing match one evening in his native County Meath, a spectator advised his mother that Murtagh had the attributes to make a good jockey: balance, poise, weight, strength, and courage. His mother wrote to the Racing Academy and Centre of Education (RACE) in County Kildare, a school for apprentice jockeys, and got a two-week trial for her son. He was one of 26 successful candidates who progressed onto the RACE 10-month course. At its end, he was apprenticed to John Oxx, one of Ireland's leading trainers.

== Career as jockey ==
Murtagh rode his first winner, Chicago Style, at Limerick in 1987.

He became stable jockey to Oxx in 1992, and from then until his departure in 2003, rode 18 Group 1 winners for Oxx's leading owner, the Aga Khan.

For Oxx, Murtagh rode Sinndar to win The Derby and Irish Derby, as well as the Prix de l'Arc de Triomphe in 2000. He won the Derby again on the Michael Bell-trained Motivator. Murtagh was also the regular jockey for talented filly Soviet Song. In 2004, the partnership won two Group 1 races, including the Sussex Stakes at Glorious Goodwood. Here she beat a strong field of colts, including the 2,000 Guineas winner Haafhd.

From 2008 to 2010, Murtagh was stable jockey for Coolmore, taking over from the drug-banned Kieren Fallon. He had been riding for them on an ad-hoc basis since 2002, most notably winning the Derby on High Chaparral in 2002. In 2008, he rode 19 Group 1 winners in a single season for Aidan O'Brien (21 in total for Coolmore), and followed it up in 2009 with another 10, including the Irish Derby, Queen Elizabeth II Stakes, Sussex Stakes, Ascot Gold Cup, St. James's Palace Stakes and an Irish 1,000 and 2,000 Guineas double.

He resigned his post as stable jockey to Coolmore in November 2010, issuing a statement via his agent to say he had informed Coolmore he wouldn't be renewing his contract. No reason was given but there was speculation that O'Brien was looking for another jockey, and on Murtagh's recent return from the Breeders Cup at Churchill Downs, where he had ridden four losers for O'Brien, one bookmaker had been offering odds on his replacement. His last Group 1 winner for the team was Roderic O'Connor in the Criterium International at Saint-Cloud on 31 October 2010.

This meant he was back riding for Oxx who trained 90 of the Aga Khan's horses, and for Mick Halford who trained another 30.

"I am thrilled to be renewing my association with His Highness' horses in Ireland," Murtagh said in a statement, "We have shared some fantastic moments over the years and I have always enjoyed riding in the green and red colours. This will also give me an opportunity to ride for John Oxx again. I started off riding for Mr Oxx and it has always been a pleasure to be part of his Currabeg team".

In February 2014, Murtagh announced that he would retire from riding to concentrate on his training career.

== Career as trainer ==
Murtagh obtained his trainer's licence in 2013. In his first season he achieved a Group 2 win and two at Group 3 level, including the Blandford Stakes with Belle de Crecy and the British Champions Long Distance Cup with Royal Diamond, riding the horses himself. His first Group 1 winner as a trainer was Champers Elysees in the Matron Stakes at Leopardstown Racecourse in September 2020. His first win at Royal Ascot as a trainer came in 2021, when Create Belief, ridden by stable jockey Ben Coen, won the Sandringham Stakes. Later that season, Sonnyboyliston provided Murtagh with his first Irish Classic win when Coen rode him to victory in the Irish St. Leger.

== Personal life ==
He is married to Orla, daughter of famous Tipperary hurler Michael "Babs" Keating, and has five children: Caroline, Charles, Lauren, Grace, and Tom.

== Major wins as a jockey ==
(Republic of Ireland) Ireland

- Irish 1,000 Guineas – (1) – Again (2009)
- Irish 2,000 Guineas – (3) – Black Minnaloushe (2001), Henrythenavigator (2008), Mastercraftsman (2009)
- Irish Champion Stakes – (1) – Timarida (1996)
- Irish Derby – (4) – Sinndar (2000), Alamshar (2003), Fame and Glory (2009), Cape Blanco (2010)
- Irish Oaks – (6) – Ebadiyla (1997), Winona (1998), Petrushka (2000), Peeping Fawn (2007), Moonstone (2008), Chicquita (2013)
- Irish St. Leger – (1) – Jukebox Jury (2011)
- Matron Stakes – (3) – Timarida (1995), Soviet Song (2004), Lillie Langtry (2010)
- Moyglare Stud Stakes – (1) – Edabiya (1998)
- National Stakes – (3) – Manntari (1993), Sinndar (1999), Mastercraftsman (2008)
- Phoenix Stakes – (3) – Mastercraftsman (2008), Alfred Nobel (2009), Zoffany (2010)
- Pretty Polly Stakes – (2) – Takarouna (1993), Ambivalent (2013)
- Tattersalls Gold Cup – (3) – Notnowcato (2007), Duke of Marmalade (2008), Fame and Glory (2010)

Canada

- E. P. Taylor Stakes – (2) – Choc Ice (2001), Mrs Lindsay (2007)

France

- Critérium International – (1) – Roderic O'Connor (2010)
- Critérium de Saint-Cloud – (2) – Fame and Glory (2008), Recital (2010)
- Prix de l'Abbaye de Longchamp – (2) – Namid (2000), Total Gallery (2009)
- Prix de l'Arc de Triomphe – (1) – Sinndar (2000)
- Prix du Cadran – (1) – Give Notice (2002)
- Prix de Diane – (1) – Valyra (2012)
- Prix Ganay – (1) – Duke of Marmalade (2008)
- Prix Marcel Boussac – (1) – Misty For Me (2010)
- Prix Morny – (1) – Bushranger (2008)
- Prix du Moulin de Longchamp – (1) – Ridgewood Pearl (1995)
- Prix de l'Opéra – (2) – Timarida (1995), Petrushka (2000)
- Prix Royal-Oak – (1) – Yeats (2008)
- Prix Vermeille – (1) – Mrs Lindsay (2007)

Germany

- Bayerisches Zuchtrennen – (2) – Timarida (1996), Greek Dance (2000)

(United Kingdom) Great Britain

- 2,000 Guineas – (2) – Rock of Gibraltar (2002), Henrythenavigator (2008)
- Ascot Gold Cup – (5) – Enzeli (1999), Royal Rebel (2001, 2002), Yeats (2008, 2009)
- Champion Stakes – (1) – Kalanisi (2000)
- Cheveley Park Stakes – (2) – Lightening Pearl (2011), Rhosdu Queen (2012)
- Coronation Cup – (2) – Soldier of Fortune (2008), Fame and Glory (2010)
- Coronation Stakes – (2) – Ridgewood Pearl (1995), Lillie Langtry (2010)
- Derby – (3) – Sinndar (2000), High Chaparral (2002), Motivator (2005)
- Eclipse Stakes – (1) – Mount Nelson (2008)
- Falmouth Stakes – (3) – Soviet Song (2004, 2005), Simply Perfect (2007)
- Fillies' Mile – (1) – Listen (2007)
- Golden Jubilee Stakes – (4) – Superior Premium (2000), Choisir (2003), Soldier's Tale (2007), Starspangledbanner (2010)
- Haydock Sprint Cup – (1) – Gordon Lord Byron (2013)
- International Stakes – (2) – Duke of Marmalade (2008), Rip Van Winkle (2010)
- July Cup – (2) – Frizzante (2004), Starspangledbanner (2010)
- King George VI and Queen Elizabeth Stakes – (4) – Alamshar (2003), Dylan Thomas (2007), Duke of Marmalade (2008), Novellist (2013)
- King's Stand Stakes – (2) – Choisir (2003), Sole Power (2013)
- Middle Park Stakes – (1) – Bushranger (2008)
- Nassau Stakes – (2) – Peeping Fawn (2007), Halfway to Heaven (2008)
- Oaks – (1) – Dancing Rain (2011)
- Prince of Wales's Stakes – (1) – Duke of Marmalade (2008)
- Queen Anne Stakes – (2) – No Excuse Needed (2002), Haradasun (2008)
- Queen Elizabeth II Stakes – (1) – Rip Van Winkle (2009)
- Racing Post Trophy – (2) – Dilshaan (2000), St Nicholas Abbey (2009)
- St. James's Palace Stakes – (3) – Black Minnaloushe (2001), Henrythenavigator (2008), Mastercraftsman (2009)
- Sussex Stakes – (3) – Soviet Song (2004), Henrythenavigator (2008), Rip Van Winkle (2009)
- Yorkshire Oaks – (3) – Key Change (1996), Petrushka (2000), Peeping Fawn (2007)

Hong Kong

- Hong Kong Vase – (1) – Daliapour (2000)

United Arab Emirates

- UAE 2,000 Guineas – (2) – Asiatic Boy (2007), Honour Devil (2008)
- UAE Derby – (1) – Honour Devil (2008)

United States

- Beverly D. Stakes – (1) – Timarida (1996)
- Breeders' Cup Marathon – (1) – Man of Iron (2009)
- Breeders' Cup Mile – (1) – Ridgewood Pearl (1995)
- Breeders' Cup Turf – (1) – Kalanisi (2000)

== Major wins as a trainer ==
(Republic of Ireland) Ireland

- Matron Stakes – (1) – Champers Elysees (2020)
- Irish St. Leger – (1) – Sonnyboyliston (2021)

Sporting positions
Preceded by Kieren Fallon	Ballydoyle retained jockey 2008–2010	Succeeded by Joseph O'Brien
