= John Oxx =

Irish horse trainer (born 1950)

Personal information
- Born: 14 July 1950 (age 76)
- Occupation: Trainer

Horse racing career
- Sport: Horse racing

Major racing wins
- British Classic Race wins: 2,000 Guineas (1); Epsom Derby (2); Irish Classic Race wins: Irish 1,000 Guineas (1); Irish Derby (2); Irish Oaks (2); Irish St. Leger (4)

Significant horses
- Eurobird, Petite Ile, Timarida, Ridgewood Pearl, Sinndar, Alamshar, Azamour, Sea The Stars

John M. Oxx (born 14 July 1950) is a retired Irish trainer of thoroughbred racehorses. By the end of the 2009 season Oxx had trained 35 Group One winners over his career, including the winners of 11 Classic races. He is best known as the trainer of Sinndar and Sea The Stars.

Oxx has been widely praised for the care and undemonstrative authority with which he approaches the training and racing of his horses. He is particularly known for being highly selective when choosing when and where his horses will run.

== Family background, education and early training ==
John Oxx is the son of John Oxx Sr., who was himself a successful trainer, winning eight Irish classic races. In 1950 Oxx's father purchased Currabeg, at the southwestern end of the Curragh in County Kildare, where Oxx Jr. took over training. He graduated from University College, Dublin, as a veterinary surgeon in 1973, and worked as his father's assistant before taking over the stable in 1979. In that year he had his first win and his first Group win with Orchestra.

== Career as a trainer ==
=== First successes ===
Oxx's first Classic win came with Eurobird in the Irish St Leger of 1987. He had a further success in the same race with Petite Ile two years later. In 1995 he trained Ridgewood Pearl, bred and owned by Sean and Anne Coughlan, to victories in the Irish 1,000 Guineas, the Coronation Stakes at Royal Ascot, the Prix du Moulin at Longchamp, and the Breeders' Cup Mile at Belmont Park, in America, meaning that the filly had six wins from eight races and that she had won Group One races in four different countries in the same season.

=== Association with the Aga Khan ===
The Aga Khan began to support Oxx's yard with a number of yearlings after Eurobird's win in 1987. When he decided to withdraw his racehorses from England following Aliysa's disqualification in The Oaks of 1989, he established a significant presence in Oxx's yard. Without a budget of his own to spend on yearlings, Oxx continued to be reliant on horses bred by owners with whom he had an association. In some years, he conceded, "you wouldn't have anything remotely near Group One standard".

Many of Oxx's major race wins have come from Aga Khan-owned horses, beginning with Manntari's victory in the National Stakes at the Curragh in 1993, and continuing with Timarida's win in the Irish Champion Stakes at Leopardstown in 1996, followed by Ebadiyla's victory in the 1997 Irish Oaks. Oxx also won that race with Winona the following year. In 2000 Oxx trained the Aga Khan's brilliant Sinndar to wins in the Epsom Derby, the Irish Derby, and the Prix de l'Arc de Triomphe, making the colt the only horse ever to have won that trio of races and at that time one of only three Irish-based horses that had ever won the Arc.

The partnership also had successes with Alamshar, who won the Irish Derby and the King George VI and Queen Elizabeth Stakes at Ascot; with Azamour, winner of the St. James's Palace Stakes, the Irish Champion Stakes, the Prince of Wales Stakes and the King George VI and Queen Elizabeth Stakes in 2004 and 2005; and with Kastoria, whose 2006 season included a win in the Irish St. Leger.

=== Sea The Stars ===
Oxx came to wider public attention when guiding Sea The Stars through a famous 2009 season in which he won Group One races in England, Ireland and France, his six consecutive triumphs including the 2,000 Guineas, The Derby and the Prix de l'Arc de Triomphe. Oxx was typically understated when assessing the role of the trainer in the career of a great horse like Sea The Stars. "You can't give them ability they don't have," he told The Independent newspaper. "Really, it's just a case of not messing it up – not to overtax the horse too soon, or ask it to do stupid things as a two-year-old. If you mind him sufficiently when he's young, hopefully his ability will blossom."

In an interview with The Observer, Oxx said of Sea The Stars: "I was always reading about racing and great horses of the past. So when you grow up with the history of racing and the history of breeding, the landmark horses that come along over a century, and more – to train one that's in that league gives you the greatest satisfaction."

== Official positions ==
Oxx served as chairman of the Irish National Stud from 1985 to 1990; he was chairman of the Irish Racehorse Trainers' Association from 1986 to 1991 and from 1993 to 1996; he has served on numerous other racing bodies and is chairman of the Racing Academy and Centre of Education. In 2008 he was given the Irish Racehorse Trainers' Association Hall of Fame award.

== Personal life ==
Oxx married Caitriona O'Sullivan in 1974. They have three children.

== Major wins ==
(Republic of Ireland) Ireland

- Irish 1,000 Guineas – (1) – Ridgewood Pearl (1995)
- Irish Champion Stakes – (3) – Timarida (1996), Azamour (2004), Sea the Stars (2009)
- Irish Derby – (2) – Sinndar (2000), Alamshar (2003)
- Irish Oaks – (2) – Ebadiyla (1997), Winona (1998)
- Irish St Leger – (4) – Eurobird (1987), Petite Ile (1989), Kastoria (2006), Alandi (2009)
- Matron Stakes – (2) – Chanzi (1993), Timarida (1995)
- Moyglare Stud Stakes – (2) – Flamenco Wave (1988), Edabiya (1998)
- National Stakes – (2) – Manntari (1993), Sinndar (1999)
- Pretty Polly Stakes – (1) – Takarouna (1993)
- Tattersalls Gold Cup -(1) – George Augustus (1995)

Canada

- E.P. Taylor Stakes – (1) – Timarida (1995)

(United Kingdom) Great Britain

- 2,000 Guineas – (1) – Sea the Stars (2009)
- Ascot Gold Cup – (1) – Enzeli (1999)
- Coronation Stakes – (1) – Ridgewood Pearl (1995)
- Derby – (2) – Sinndar (2000), Sea the Stars (2009)
- Eclipse Stakes – (1) – Sea the Stars (2009)
- International Stakes – (1) – Sea the Stars (2009)
- King George VI and Queen Elizabeth Stakes – (2) – Alamshar (2003), Azamour (2005)
- Prince of Wales's Stakes – (1) – Azamour (2005)
- St. James's Palace Stakes – (1) – Azamour (2004)
- Yorkshire Oaks - (1) - Key Change (1996)

France

- Prix de l'Arc de Triomphe – (2) – Sinndar (2000), Sea the Stars (2009)
- Prix du Cadran – (1) – Alandi (2009)
- Prix du Moulin de Longchamp – (1) – Ridgewood Pearl (1995)
- Prix de l'Opéra – (1) – Timarida (1995)
- Prix de l'Abbaye de Longchamp - (1) – Namid (2000)
- Prix Royal-Oak - (1) - Ebadiyla (1997)

Germany

- Bayerisches Zuchtrennen – (1) – Timarida (1996)

United States

- Beverly D. Stakes – (1) – Timarida (1996)
- Breeders' Cup Mile – (1) – Ridgewood Pearl (1995)
