= Peter Davies (horse) =

American-bred Thoroughbred racehorse

- Sire: Bering
- Grandsire: Arctic Tern
- Dam: French Flick
- Damsire: Silent Screen
- Sex: Stallion
- Foaled: 3 March 1988
- Country: United States
- Colour: Chestnut
- Breeder: Pamela H Firman
- Owner: Charles St George; Edward St George/ Lucayan Stud
- Trainer: Henry Cecil; André Fabre; David Loder; Ron McAnally
- Record: 19: 5-1-1
- Earnings: £215,906

Major wins
- Somerville Tattersall Stakes (1990); Racing Post Trophy (1990)

Peter Davies (3 March 1988 – after 2010) was an American-bred, British-trained Thoroughbred racehorse and sire. As a two-year-old in 1990 he was one of the best staying colts of his generation in Britain, winning all three of his races including the Somerville Tattersall Stakes and the Racing Post Trophy. He did not fulfil his early promise, failing to win a race in the next two seasons before winning twice as a five-year-old in 1993. He was later transferred to race in the United States and subsequently relocated to South Africa but had no further success before being retired from racing at the age of seven.

== Background ==
Peter Davies was a chestnut horse with a white blaze and four long white socks bred in Kentucky at Pamela H Firman's Whileaway Farm. He was from the first crop of foals sired by Bering, who won the Prix du Jockey Club and finished second to Dancing Brave in the 1986 Prix de l'Arc de Triomphe. As a breeding stallion, the best of his offspring included Pennekamp, American Post, Glorosia and Matiara (Poule d'Essai des Pouliches). Peter Davies' dam French Flick was a successful racemare who won five of her thirty-three races between 1981 and 1983. She was a great-granddaughter of Lea Lark, an American broodmare whose other descendants have included Tobougg, Miswaki, Almutawakel, Southern Halo and White Muzzle.

As a yearling in September 1990, the colt was offered for sale at Keeneland and was bought for $20,000 by Jackie Ramos. He entered the ownership of Charles St George and was sent to Europe where he entered training with Henry Cecil at his Warren Place stable in Newmarket, Suffolk.

== Racing career ==
=== 1990: two-year-old season ===
Peter Davies began his racing career in a seven furlong maiden race at Leicester Racecourse on 11 September and started at odds of 5/1 in a twelve-runner field. Ridden as in all his races that year by Steve Cauthen he led from the start, accelerated approaching the final furlong and won "easily" by four lengths. He was then moved up in class for the Somerville Tattersall Stakes over the same distance at Newmarket Racecourse in which he was matched against Bog Trotter, the winner of the Champagne Stakes. After racing in second place behind the outsider Regal Crest, he went to the front a furlong out and won by two lengths from Bog Trotter.

The Racing Post Trophy over one mile at Doncaster Racecourse on 27 October saw Peter Davies stepping up to Group One level and starting the 2/1 joint favourite alongside Mujaazif, the Michael Stoute-trained winner of the Royal Lodge Stakes. The only other two runners were the Vintage Stakes winner Mukaddamah and the Barry Hills-trained Marcham, the winner of his only previous start. After leading from the start, Peter Davies was overtaken by Mukaddamah two furlongs out, but rallied strongly in the closing stages, regained the advantage in the final stride and won by a short head. Marcham was four lengths back in third whilst Mujaazif finished tailed off.

=== 1991: three-year-old season ===
In the spring of 1991, Peter Davies was regarded as a serious contender for the Derby Stakes and began his season in the Dante Stakes (a major trial for the Epsom classic) over 10 1/2 furlongs at York Racecourse. Ridden by Lester Piggott he started favourite and led from the start, but after being overtaken three furlongs from the finish he dropped back quickly and finished seventh of the eight runners behind Environment Friend. After a break of four months he returned in a minor race over one mile at Newbury Racecourse in September. He took the lead in the last quarter mile but was outpaced in the closing stages and finished fourth.

=== 1992: four-year-old season ===
As a four-year-old Peter Davies was trained by André Fabre and campaigned in France but made no impact, finishing unplaced in his two starts. He ran down the field in the Prix Exbury at Saint-Cloud Racecourse in March and a minor race at Maisons-Laffitte in May. On 30 November 1992 the colt was put up for auction at the Tattersalls sale but was not sold as he failed to reach his reserve price of 50,000 guineas. He was later transferred to the ownership of Charles St George's brother Edward, who raced the colt in the name of his Lucayan Stud.

=== 1993: five-year-old season ===
David Loder took over as Peter Davies' trainer for the 1993 season. He began the season by finishing second in a minor race at York after which Frankie Dettori took over as his jockey. On 3 June he started at odds of 3/1 for a race over 8 1/2 furlongs at Epsom Downs Racecourse and recorded his first success for well over 2 1/2 years as he won by a head from the four-year-old Powerful Edge. A month later he won again, carrying top weight of 133 pounds to a two-length victory in a handicap race over one mile at Sandown Park Racecourse. On his final European appearance he carried 139 pounds in a valuable handicap at Goodwood Racecourse and started favourite but finished eighteenth of the nineteen runners. Commenting on the poor run, Loder said "I've asked the horse to explain himself but he's not saying anything".

In August, Peter Davies was sent to Chicago to contest the Grade I Arlington Million and finished fifth behind Star of Cozzene. He remained in the United States and finished sixth in an allowance race at Arlington in September before joining the stable of Ron McAnally. On his only other run of the year he finished last of six in an allowance at Hollywood Park Racetrack in December.

=== 1994 & 1995: later racing career ===
In the early part of 1994, Peter Davies was unplaced in two allowance races at Santa Anita Park and was off the course for the rest of the year. As a seven-year-old in 1995 he was moved to South Africa and reportedly finished third once and unplaced twice.

== Stud record ==
Peter Davies retired from racing to become a breeding stallion in South Africa: he had no success as a sire of racehorses but reportedly sired some good show jumpers. His last reported foals were born in 2011.

== Pedigree ==
Pedigree of Peter Davies (USA), chestnut stallion, 1988
Sire Bering (GB) 1983	Arctic Tern (USA); 1973	Sea-Bird	Dan Cupid
Sire Bering (GB) 1983	Arctic Tern (USA); 1973	Sea-Bird	Sicalade
Sire Bering (GB) 1983	Arctic Tern (USA); 1973	Bubbling Beauty	Hasty Road
Sire Bering (GB) 1983	Arctic Tern (USA); 1973	Bubbling Beauty	Almahmoud
Sire Bering (GB) 1983	Beaune (FR); 1974	Lyphard	Northern Dancer
Sire Bering (GB) 1983	Beaune (FR); 1974	Lyphard	Goofed
Sire Bering (GB) 1983	Beaune (FR); 1974	Barbra	Le Fabuleux
Sire Bering (GB) 1983	Beaune (FR); 1974	Barbra	Biobelle
Dam French Flick (USA) 1978	Silent Screen (USA); 1967	Prince John	Princequillo
Dam French Flick (USA) 1978	Silent Screen (USA); 1967	Prince John	Not Afraid
Dam French Flick (USA) 1978	Silent Screen (USA); 1967	Prayer Bell	Better Self
Dam French Flick (USA) 1978	Silent Screen (USA); 1967	Prayer Bell	Sunday Evening
Dam French Flick (USA) 1978	Tres Jolie (USA); 1967	Herbager	Vandale
Dam French Flick (USA) 1978	Tres Jolie (USA); 1967	Herbager	Flagette
Dam French Flick (USA) 1978	Tres Jolie (USA); 1967	Leallah	Nasrullah
Dam French Flick (USA) 1978	Tres Jolie (USA); 1967	Leallah	Lea Lark (Family:16-g)
