= Glorosia =

French-bred Thoroughbred racehorse

Gloriosa
- Sire: Bering
- Grandsire: Arctic Tern
- Dam: Golden Sea
- Damsire: Saint Cyrien
- Sex: Mare
- Foaled: 4 March 1995
- Country: France
- Colour: Chestnut
- Breeder: Alec Head
- Owner: Robert Smith; Georg von Ullmann
- Trainer: Luca Cumani
- Record: 11: 3-1-2
- Earnings: £120,974

Major wins
- Fillies' Mile (1997)

Glorosia (foaled 4 March 1995) was a French-bred British-trained thoroughbred racehorse and broodmare. In a racing career which lasted from July 1997 until September 1999 she won three times and was placed three times from eleven races. She was at her best as a two-year-old when she won on her debut, finished third in the May Hill Stakes and then recorded her biggest success in the Fillies' Mile at Ascot Racecourse. She struggled as a three-year-old and failed to win in three races. She remained in training at four and won one minor race from five attempts. After her retirement from racing she became a broodmare in Germany.

== Background ==
Glorosia was a chestnut mare with a white blaze and three white socks bred in France by Alec Head. She was sired by Bering, who won the Prix du Jockey Club and finished second to Dancing Brave in the 1986 Prix de l'Arc de Triomphe. As a breeding stallion, the best of his offspring included Pennekamp, American Post, Peter Davies and Matiara (Poule d'Essai des Pouliches). Her dam Golden Sea, also bred by the Head family, won four minor races in France before being retired to broodmare duty. She was a distant descendant of the American broodmare Speed Boat, the female-line ancestor of Sword Dancer, Hail To All and Rachel Alexandra.

The filly entered the ownership of Robert Smith and was sent into training with Luca Cumani at Newmarket.

== Racing career ==
=== 1997: two-year-old season ===
Glorosia began her racing career in a maiden race over seven furlongs at Newmarket Racecourse on 18 July. Ridden as in all her races that year by Frankie Dettori she started at odds of 9/2 in field of eleven juvenile fillies. After leading for the first five furlongs she was overtaken by Particular Friend before rallying in the closing stages to regain the advantage and win by a neck.

After a break of almost two months, Glorosia was stepped up in class for the Group Three May Hill Stakes over one mile at Doncaster Racecourse on 11 September. Starting at odds of 100/30 she stayed on in the closing stages without looking likely to win and finished third behind the favourite Midnight Line and Flawless. Seventeen days later the filly was moved up in class again for the Group One Fillies' Mile at Ascot Racecourse and started 10/1 fourth choice in the betting behind the Henry Cecil-trained pair Jibe and Midnight Line and the Michael Stoute-trained Exclusive. Dettori tracked the leaders before sending the filly into the lead two furlongs out. The race behind the leader became rather rough, with both Jibe and Midnight Line meeting interference as they attempted to obtain a clear run. Glorosia however, kept on well and stayed on well to win by three quarters of length from Jibe, with two lengths back to Exclusive in third.

=== 1998: three-year-old season ===
Gloriosa was slow to reach full fitness as a three-year-old and missed the early part of the 1998 season, making her first appearance of the year in the Prix de Malleret over 2400 metres at Longchamp Racecourse on 21 June. She led for most of the way, but was outpaced in the closing stages and finished third, six lengths behind the winner Another Dancer. Walter Swinburn took the ride when the filly was sent to Ireland for the Irish Oaks at the Curragh on 12 July. She started second favourite but after leading until the last quarter mile she dropped out of contention and finished fifth of the nine runners behind Winona. Gloriosa was then dropped in class and started odds-on favourite for a minor race at Chepstow Racecourse in September but was beaten four lengths by her only opponent Lady In Waiting.

In December, Glorosia was consigned to the Tattersalls sale and was bought for 650,000 guineas by Fiona Needham for German International Bloodtsock on behalf of Baron Georg von Ullmann.

=== 1999: four-year-old season ===
Glorosia remained in training with Cumani as a four-year-old and began her season by finishing fourth in the Victress Stakes at Epsom in June. Later that month she started odds-on favourite against two opponents in a minor event at Windsor Racecourse and recorded her first victory since 1997 as she led from the start and won by eight lengths. Her three remaining races were all in Listed class. She finished fourth in the Steventon Stakes at Newbury in July, fifth in the Upavon Fillies' Stakes at Salisbury in August and ended her racing career by finishing fifth in the Strensall Stakes at York on 2 September.

== Breeding record ==
Glorosia was retired from racing to become a broodmare for her owner Georg von Ullmann. She produced at least six foals and three winners between 2001 and 2009:

- Gentle Tiger, a bay colt, foaled in 2001, sired by Tiger Hill. Won at least one Listed race.
- Glorious Storm, chestnut colt, 2002, by Monsun. Failed to win in three races.
- Glory Days, bay filly, 2003, by Tiger Hill. Failed to win in two races.
- Ghizao, bay colt (later gelded), 2004, by Tiger Hill. Won six National Hunt races including the November Novices' Chase.
- Glorybe, chestnut filly, 2006, by Monsun. Won two races.
- Full Swing, brown colt, 2009, by Manduro. Failed to win in three races.

== Pedigree ==
Pedigree of Glorosia (FR), chestnut mare, 1995
Sire Bering (GB) 1983	Arctic Tern (USA); 1973	Sea-Bird	Dan Cupid
Sire Bering (GB) 1983	Arctic Tern (USA); 1973	Sea-Bird	Sicalade
Sire Bering (GB) 1983	Arctic Tern (USA); 1973	Bubbling Beauty	Hasty Road
Sire Bering (GB) 1983	Arctic Tern (USA); 1973	Bubbling Beauty	Almahmoud
Sire Bering (GB) 1983	Beaune (FR); 1974	Lyphard	Northern Dancer
Sire Bering (GB) 1983	Beaune (FR); 1974	Lyphard	Goofed
Sire Bering (GB) 1983	Beaune (FR); 1974	Barbra	Le Fabuleux
Sire Bering (GB) 1983	Beaune (FR); 1974	Barbra	Biobelle
Dam Golden Sea (FR) 1987	Saint Cyrien (FR); 1980	Luthier	Klairon
Dam Golden Sea (FR) 1987	Saint Cyrien (FR); 1980	Luthier	Flute Enchantee
Dam Golden Sea (FR) 1987	Saint Cyrien (FR); 1980	Sevres	Riverman
Dam Golden Sea (FR) 1987	Saint Cyrien (FR); 1980	Sevres	Saratoga
Dam Golden Sea (FR) 1987	Green City (FR); 1981	Green Dancer	Nijinsky
Dam Golden Sea (FR) 1987	Green City (FR); 1981	Green Dancer	Green Valley
Dam Golden Sea (FR) 1987	Green City (FR); 1981	Gadfly	Le Fabuleux
Dam Golden Sea (FR) 1987	Green City (FR); 1981	Gadfly	Chatter Box (Family:1-o)

- Glorosia was inbred 4 × 4 to Le Fabuleux, meaning that this stallion appears twice in the fourth generation of her pedigree.
