= American Post =

British-bred Thoroughbred racehorse

- Sire: Bering
- Grandsire: Arctic Tern
- Dam: Wells Fargo
- Damsire: Sadler's Wells
- Sex: Stallion
- Foaled: 3 February 2001
- Country: United Kingdom
- Colour: Brown
- Breeder: Juddmonte Farms
- Owner: Khalid Abdullah
- Trainer: Criquette Head-Maarek
- Record: 9: 6-1-0
- Earnings: £495,759

Major wins
- Prix Jean-Luc Lagardère (2003); Racing Post Trophy (2003); Prix Omnium II (2004); Prix de Fontainebleau (2004); Poule d'Essai des Poulains (2004)

American Post (3 February 2001 - 25 May 2016) is a British-bred, French-trained Thoroughbred racehorse and sire. He was one of the best two-year-olds of his generation in Europe in 2003, recovering from a narrow defeat on his debut to win his three remaining races and becoming the first horse to win both the Prix Jean-Luc Lagardère in France and the Racing Post Trophy in England. In the following spring he extended his winning run to six with victories in the Prix Omnium II, Prix de Fontainebleau and the Poule d'Essai des Poulains before finishing sixth when third favourite for the Epsom Derby. After a disappointing run in his only subsequent start he was retired from racing with a record of six wins from nine starts. According to his trainer he was exceptionally fond of carrots. He became a breeding stallion in France and has had some success as a sire of winners.

== Background ==
American Post is a brown horse with a white star bred in the United Kingdom by his owner Khalid Abdullah's Juddmonte Farm. He was sired by Bering, who won the Prix du Jockey Club and finished second to Dancing Brave in the 1986 Prix de l'Arc de Triomphe. As a breeding stallion, his other offspring included Pennekamp, Glorosia, Peter Davies (Racing Post Trophy) and Matiara (Poule d'Essai des Pouliches). His dam Wells Fargo was an unraced daughter of Sadler's Wells :died at the age of five soon after producing American Post, who was her only foal. Wells Fargo's dam Cruising Height was a successful racehorse and broodmare, finishing second in the Lancashire Oaks and producing several other winners including High and Low who won the Cheshire Oaks and finished second in the St Leger. She was descended from the broodmare Madrilene, the ancestor of several other good winners including High Top and Old Vic.

The colt was sent into training with Criquette Head-Maarek at Chantilly.

== Racing career ==
=== 2003: two-year-old season ===
On his racecourse debut, American Post was beaten a short head by Ximb in a contest for previously unraced colts and geldings over 1200 metres at Deauville Racecourse on 31 July. After a six-week break he returned at Longchamp Racecourse in September and started 1.8/1 favourite for a minor event over 1400 metres. Ridden as on his debut by Olivier Peslier he turned into the straight in fourth place, took the lead 200 metres from the finish and won by two lengths from Dealer Choice. Richard Hughes took over the ride when the colt was stepped up to Group One level for the Prix Jean-Luc Lagadere over the same course and distance on 5 October. Despite its status, the race attracted only six runners, none of whom had won at Group race level. Ximb was made favourite ahead of the Listed race winner Charming Prince and the Aidan O'Brien-trained maiden race winner Tycoon, with American Post fourth in the betting on 4/1. The other two runners, Newton and Acropolis were also trained by O'Brien. After behaving poorly before the start, American Post was settled in third behind Charming Prince before making a forward move in the straight. He went to the front 300 metres out and drew clear of his opponents to win "easily" by four lengths.

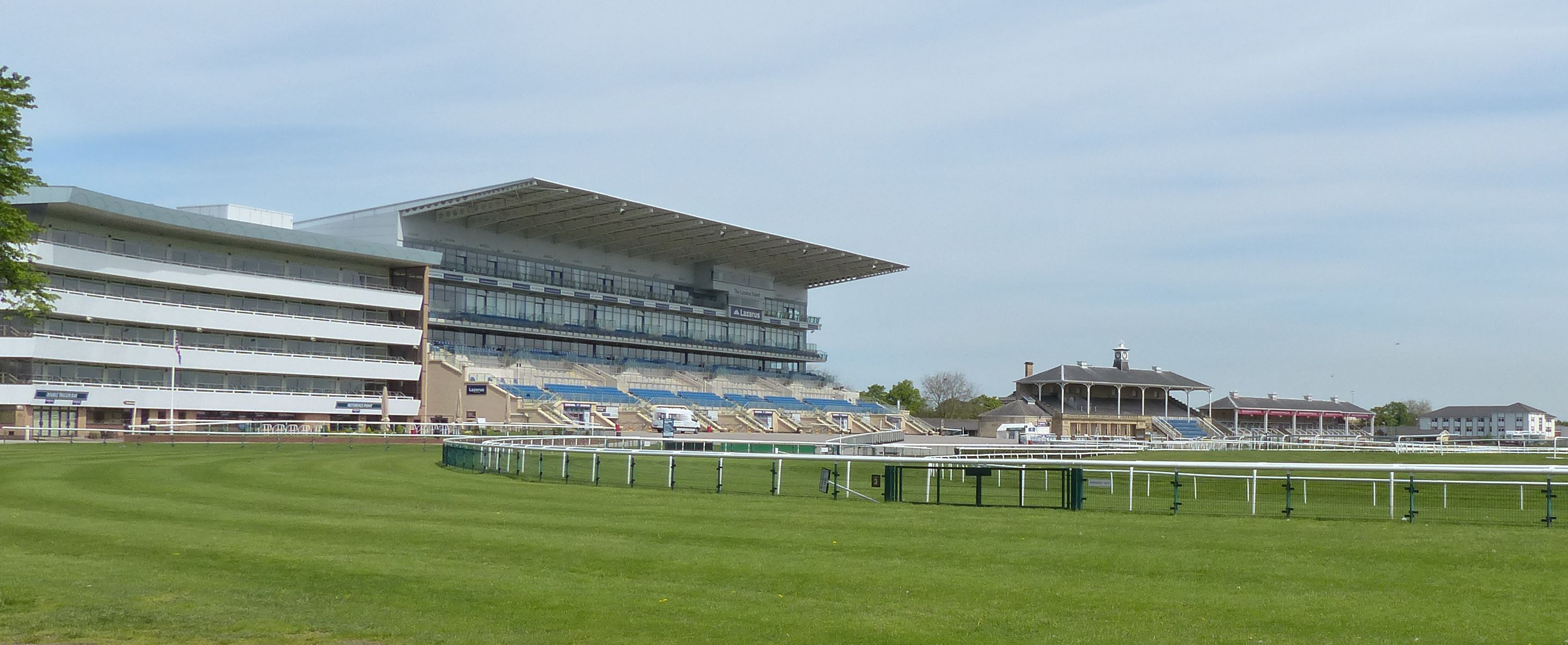
Doncaster Racecourse, where American Post won the Racing Post Trophy

No winner of the Prix Jean-Luc Lagadere had ever won the Group One Racing Post Trophy in England, but American Post attempted to break the trend when he started 5/6 favourite for the British race over one mile at Doncaster Racecourse on 25 October. His owner had to pay a supplementary entry fee of £17,500 as the colt had not been among the original entries for the race. His three opponents were the O'Brien-trained Magritte, the Autumn Stakes winner Fantastic View and the 16/1 outsider Tahreeb. Ridden by Christophe Soumillon he raced in second behind Magritte before taking the lead approaching the final furlong and won by one and three quarter lengths. Fantastic View took second ahead of Magritte and Tahreeb. Apart from completing the unique Longchamp- Doncaster double, American Post became the first French-trained winner of the race since the Alec Head-trained Green Dancer in 1974. After the race Criquette Head said He's a very talented colt. He didn't have to race today, he's done nothing, really. He did everything so easily" whilst Soumillon commented "He travelled easily following the leader and showed a good turn of foot when I asked him. He went a little bit to his right inside the final furlong, but I would put that down to being a bit babyish. He is very good".

Criquette Head-Maarek later explained the improvement in the colt's behaviour at the start compared to his unruly attitude at Longchamp: "I gave a carrot to a handler at the stalls and American Post followed it into his berth".

=== 2004: three-year-old season ===
American Post began his second season in the Listed Prix Omnium II over 1600 metres at Saint-Cloud Racecourse on 31 March and started odds-on favourite against four opponents. After disputing the lead from the start, he broke away from his rivals in the last 150 metres to win by four lengths from the Alain de Royer-Dupré trained Joursanvault. After the race Head-Maarek described American Post as the "perfect type" for The Derby and bookmakers made him second favourite for the race behind Yeats. In April the colt again started odds-on favourite when he contested the Group Three Prix de Fontainebleau over the same distance at Longchamp. His three opponents on this occasion were Diamond Green (the undefeated winner of the Prix La Rochette), Antonius Pius (Railway Stakes) and Blackdoun. Ridden by Soumillon he led from the start before accelerating in the last 200m to win by a length from Antonius Pius who was subsequently disqualified for hampering Diamond Green. Head-Maarek commented "American Post was given a lovely ride and did not have a hard race. That is exactly what I wanted".

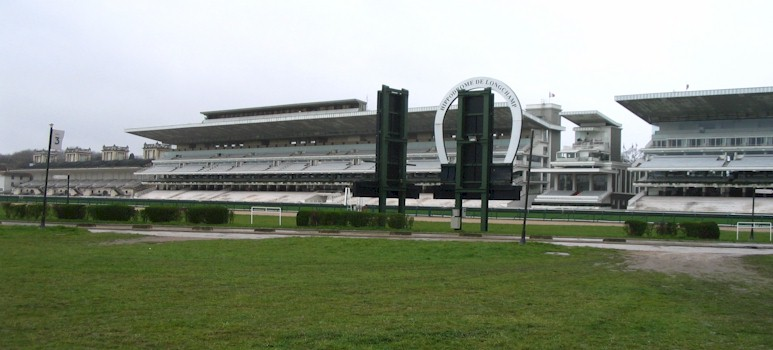
Longchamp Racecourse, where American Post won two Group One races

After five consecutive victories, American Post, with Hughes in the saddle, started odds-on favourite for the Group One Poule d'Essai des Poulains at Longchamp on 16 May. Diamond Green, Antonius Pius and Newton were again in opposition whilst the other three runners were Byron (Mill Reef Stakes), Ershaad and Sunday Doubt. American Post raced in third place as Newton set the pace before moving up to challenge in the straight. The closing stages were closely contested and extremely rough, with Bryon taking the lead before Antonius Pius took over and looked certain to win before veering right into the rails, hampering Diamond Green in the process. In a blanket finish, American Post took the lead 50 metres out and prevailed by half a length from Diamond Green with Byron, Ershaad and Antonius Pius just behind. Criquette Head-Maarek admitted that her colt had been a lucky winner saying "I was disappointed because he would have been second and he was beat" and expressing the view that American Post had been unsuited by the firm ground.

For his next race, American Post was stepped up in distance for the 225th running of the Epsom Derby over one and a half miles at Epsom Downs Racecourse on 5 June. Ridden by Hughes was made the 13/2 third choice in a fourteen-runner field behind the Dante Stakes winner North Light and the 2000 Guineas runner-up Snow Ridge. After turning into the straight in fourth he moved up to second place approaching the last quarter mile but weakened in the closing stages and finished sixth behind North Light. American Post made his final racecourse in the Prix du Moulin over 1600 metres at Longchamp in September. He disputed second place early in the straight but dropped away quickly and finished tenth of the eleven runners behind the filly Grey Lilas.

His retirement was announced in November. Head-Maarek commented "We've retired him as he's had a problem with a hind hock. He was a very good horse and had rather a special but appealing personality. He had his own ideas and we had to tempt him into the stalls with a carrot".

== Stud record ==
American Post was retired from racing to become a breeding stallion at the Haras d'Etreham before moving to Haras National Treban in 2015. The best of his offspring have included Robin of Navan (Critérium de Saint-Cloud), Liliside (disqualified after winning the Poule d'Essai des Poulains), American Devil (Prix du Palais-Royal).

== Pedigree ==
Pedigree of American Post (GB), brown stallion, 2001
Sire Bering (GB) 1983	Arctic Tern (USA); 1973	Sea-Bird	Dan Cupid
Sire Bering (GB) 1983	Arctic Tern (USA); 1973	Sea-Bird	Sicalade
Sire Bering (GB) 1983	Arctic Tern (USA); 1973	Bubbling Beauty	Hasty Road
Sire Bering (GB) 1983	Arctic Tern (USA); 1973	Bubbling Beauty	Almahmoud
Sire Bering (GB) 1983	Beaune (FR); 1974	Lyphard	Northern Dancer
Sire Bering (GB) 1983	Beaune (FR); 1974	Lyphard	Goofed
Sire Bering (GB) 1983	Beaune (FR); 1974	Barbra	Le Fabuleux
Sire Bering (GB) 1983	Beaune (FR); 1974	Barbra	Biobelle
Dam Wells Fargo (GB) 1996	Sadler's Wells (USA); 1981	Northern Dancer	Nearctic
Dam Wells Fargo (GB) 1996	Sadler's Wells (USA); 1981	Northern Dancer	Natalma
Dam Wells Fargo (GB) 1996	Sadler's Wells (USA); 1981	Fairy Bridge	Bold Reason
Dam Wells Fargo (GB) 1996	Sadler's Wells (USA); 1981	Fairy Bridge	Special
Dam Wells Fargo (GB) 1996	Cruising Height (GB); 1987	Shirley Heights	Mill Reef
Dam Wells Fargo (GB) 1996	Cruising Height (GB); 1987	Shirley Heights	Hardiemma
Dam Wells Fargo (GB) 1996	Cruising Height (GB); 1987	Nomadic Pleasure	Habitat
Dam Wells Fargo (GB) 1996	Cruising Height (GB); 1987	Nomadic Pleasure	Petite Marmite (Family:11-a)

- American Post was inbred 3 × 4 to Northern Dancer, meaning that this stallion appears in both the third and fourth generations of his pedigree.
