= Prix Omnium II =

Flat horse race in France

- Class: Listed
- Location: Saint-Cloud Racecourse; Saint-Cloud, France
- Inaugurated: 1901
- Race type: Flat / Thoroughbred
- Website: france-galop.com

Race information
- Distance: 1,600 metres (1 mile)
- Surface: Turf
- Track: Left-handed
- Qualification: Three-year-old colts and geldings
- Weight: 58 kg
- Purse: €55,000 (2024); 1st: €27,500

Prix Omnium II
2023
| American Flag | Kendly | Birr Castle |

Previous years
2022
| Dreamflight | Valmer Magic | My Fancy |
2021
| Galik | Easter | Perseverants |

2020-2011
2019
Shaman | Sagauteur | Go To Hollywood
2018
Francesco Bere | Intellogent | Nosdargent
2017
Markazi | Yuman | Mitchouka
2016
Dicton | Barwod | Helene Charisma
2015
Green Sweet | Jolly Good Kitten | Grand Argentier
2014
Skyrockets | Army Bulletin | Secret Admirer
2013
Wire To Wire | Le Ring | Princedargent
2012
Coup De Theatre | Lucayan | Navel Orange
2011
Barocci | Private Jet | Two For Two

2010-2001
2010
No Risk At All | Tip Toe | Behkabad
2009
Silver Frost | Milanais | Calvados Blues
2008
Gris Tendre | Arcadia's Angle | Bon Grain
2007
Hurricane Fly | Literato | Spirit One
2006
Porto Santo | Rhenus | Salsalava
2005
Helios Quercus | Salut Thomas | Laverock
2004
American Post | Joursanvault | Blackdoun
2003
Sign Of The Wolf | Krataios | Snipewalk
2002
Medecis | Loup Masque | Anaken
2001
Aghnoyoh | Greengroom | Pares

2000-1991
2000
Cheers Hong Kong | Miraculous | Contexte
1999
Iridanos | Speed Jaro | Le Roi Chic
1998
River Ball | Enjoleur | Texas Tornado
1997
Vernoy | Keep Playing | Rubruck
1996
Go Between | Malouet | Grand Vizir
1995
Petit Poucet | Secret And Fair | Sharpest Image
1994
Scandinavian | Blue King | Filao Beach
1993
Bigstone | Le Balafre | Seaton Delaval
1992
Arazi | Supermec | River Majesty

The Prix Omnium II is a Listed flat horse race in France open to three-year-old thoroughbred colts and geldings. It is run over a distance of 1,600 metres (about 1 mile) at Saint-Cloud in late March or early April.

== History ==
The event was originally called the Prix de Saint-Cloud. The first running was staged during the venue's inaugural fixture in 1901. It replaced the Prix de Vincennes, a similar race at Vincennes. It was initially contested over 2,100 metres.

The Prix de Saint-Cloud was cut to 2,000 metres in 1904. It was shortened to 1,600 metres after World War I. It continued with its original title until 1927.

The race was renamed in honour of Omnium II, a successful racehorse and sire, in 1928. It was run over 2,100 metres in 1929. From this point it was held on the same day as the Prix La Camargo, the equivalent race for fillies. It reverted to 1,600 metres in 1930.

The Prix Omnium II was held at Longchamp in 1940. It took place at Auteuil from 1941 to 1944.

The event can serve as a trial for the Poule d'Essai des Poulains. The last horse to win both races was Silver Frost in 2009.

== Records ==
Leading jockey since 1979 (6 wins):

- Christophe Soumillon – Silver Frost (2009), Barocci (2011), Wire to Wire (2013), Salai (2014), Markazi (2017), American Flag (2023)

Leading trainer since 1979 (5 wins):

- Jean-Claude Rouget – Gris Tendre (2008), Wire to Wire (2013), Salai (2014), Green Sweet (2015), Markazi (2017)

Leading owner since 1979 (3 wins): (includes part ownership)

- Wertheimer et Frère – Medecis (2002), Green Sweet (2015), Shaman (2019)

== Winners since 1979 ==
| Year | Winner | Jockey | Trainer | Owner | Time |
|---|---|---|---|---|---|
| 1979 | Sharpman | Philippe Paquet | François Boutin | Sir Charles Clore |
| 1980 | Confetti | Henri Samani | Patrick Biancone | Mrs Patrick Goureau |
| 1981 | Big John | Georges Doleuze | E. Chevalier du Fau | John Michael |
| 1982 | Alfred's Choice | Michel-Lionel Dureuil | Edouard Bartholomew | Countess de Baillet-Latour |
| 1983 | Castle Guard | Maurice Philipperon | John Fellows | Peter Richards |
| 1984 | Green Paradise | Alfred Gibert | André Fabre | Mahmoud Fustok |
| 1985 | Shayzari | Yves Saint-Martin | Alain de Royer-Dupré | Aga Khan IV |
| 1986 | Kadrou | Alfred Gibert | Jean Laumain | Henri Rabatel |
| 1987 | Groom Dancer | Dominique Boeuf | Tony Clout | Marvin Warner |
| 1988 | Triteamtri | Dominique Boeuf | Alain Falourd | Marvin Warner |
| 1989 | Lioubovnik | Eric Saint-Martin | François Boutin | Mrs François Boutin |
| 1990 | Slew the Slewor | Gérald Mossé | François Boutin | Allen Paulson |
| 1991 | Signac | Guy Guignard | William Cargeeg | Michael Smurfit |
| 1992 | Arazi | Steve Cauthen | François Boutin | Paulson / Sheikh Moh'd | 1:48.00 |
| 1993 | Bigstone | Dominique Boeuf | Élie Lellouche | Daniel Wildenstein | 1:40.90 |
| 1994 | Scandinavian | Guy Guignard | Noël Pelat | Marquis de Geoffre | 1:52.10 |
| 1995 | Petit Poucet | Cash Asmussen | Nicolas Clément | Stavros Niarchos | 1:51.60 |
| 1996 | Go Between | Olivier Doleuze | Georges Doleuze | Naji Pharaon | 1:47.80 |
| 1997 | Vernoy | Antoine Sanglard | André Fabre | Sheikh Mohammed | 1:45.30 |
| 1998 | River Ball | Frédéric Spanu | Jean-François Bernard | Axelle Nègre | 1:48.80 |
| 1999 | Iridanos | Dominique Boeuf | Carlos Laffon-Parias | Leonidas Marinopoulos | 1:49.80 |
| 2000 | Firyal Pursuit (Note: The 2000 winner Firyal Pursuit was later exported to Hong Kong and renamed Cheers Hong Kong) | Thierry Thulliez | Patrick Khozian | Patrick Dreux | 1:50.30 |
| 2001 | Aghnoyoh | Thierry Gillet | Tony Clout | Gerhard Sybrecht | 1:59.60 |
| 2002 | Medecis | Olivier Doleuze | Criquette Head-Maarek | Wertheimer et Frère | 1:47.00 |
| 2003 | Sign of the Wolf | Thierry Jarnet | François Rohaut | Andrew Crichton | 1:48.10 |
| 2004 | American Post | Richard Hughes | Criquette Head-Maarek | Khalid Abdullah | 1:43.00 |
| 2005 | Helios Quercus | Alexandre Roussel | Cyriaque Diard | Thierry Maudet | 1:49.30 |
| 2006 | Porto Santo | Stéphane Pasquier | Philippe Demercastel | Aleyrion Bloodstock Ltd | 1:53.00 |
| 2007 | Hurricane Fly | François-Xavier Bertras | Jean-Luc Pelletan | Hans-Peter Breitenstein | 1:49.50 |
| 2008 | Gris Tendre | Ioritz Mendizabal | Jean-Claude Rouget | Exors of Guy de Rothschild | 1:52.30 |
| 2009 | Silver Frost | Christophe Soumillon | Yves de Nicolay | John Cotton | 1:41.90 |
| 2010 | No Risk at All | Thomas Huet | Jean-Paul Gallorini | Sylvia Wildenstein | 1:47.80 |
| 2011 | Barocci | Christophe Soumillon | Élie Lellouche | Ecurie Wildenstein | 1:48.90 |
| 2012 | Coup de Theatre | Ronan Thomas | Philippe van de Poele | Antoine Sauty de Chalon | 1:43.30 |
| 2013 | Wire to Wire | Christophe Soumillon | Jean-Claude Rouget | Ecurie I. M. Fares | 1:47.72 |
| 2014 | Salai | Christophe Soumillon | Jean-Claude Rouget | Martin S. Schwartz | 1:46.01 |
| 2015 | Green Sweet | Olivier Peslier | Jean-Claude Rouget | Wertheimer et Frère | 1:41.03 |
| 2016 | Dicton | Olivier Peslier | Gianluca Bietolini | Robert Ng | 1:42.23 |
| 2017 | Markazi | Christophe Soumillon | Jean-Claude Rouget | Aga Khan IV | 1:42.76 |
| 2018 | Francesco Bere (Note: The 2018 running took place at Fontainebleau) | Alexandre Gavilan | Didier Guillemin | Mme Gerard Lesur | 1:43.70 |
| 2019 | Shaman | Maxime Guyon | Carlos Laffon-Parias | Wertheimer et Frère | 1:49.56 |
| 2021 | Galik | Julien Auge | Christophe Ferland | Guy Pariente | 1:46.11 |
| 2022 | Dreamflight | Olivier Peslier | André Fabre | Lady Bamford | 1:40.93 |
| 2023 | American Flag | Christophe Soumillon | Yann Barberot | Malcolm Parrish | 1:46.65 |
| 2024 | Ramadan | Aurelien Lemaitre | Christopher Head | Nurian Bizakov | 1:55.28 |
| 2025 | Darius Cen | Stéphane Pasquier | Victoria Head | Yeguada Centurion Slu | 1:42.10 |

== Earlier winners ==
- 1901: Juniperus
- 1902: Barde
- 1903: Nordenskjold
- 1904: Borgia
- 1905: Hanoi
- 1906: Prestige
- 1907: Pernod
- 1908: Monitor
- 1909: Verdun
- 1910: Radis Rose
- 1911: Faucheur
- 1912: Le Cid
- 1913: Saint Pe
- 1914: Durbar
- 1920: Deepdale
- 1921: Spectateur
- 1922: Grillemont
- 1923: Guemul
- 1924: Soldat de France
- 1925: Burgos
- 1926: Diplomate
- 1927: Gros Chou
- 1928: Guy Fawkes
- 1929: Vatout
- 1930: Montreal
- 1931: Mameluck
- 1932: Rustaud
- 1933: Pantalon
- 1934: Rentenmark
- 1935: Nerondes
- 1936: Sanguinetto
- 1937: Allumeur
- 1938: Becasson
- 1939: Bon Voyage
- 1940: Flying Call
- 1941: Blue Mill
- 1942: Express
- 1943: Fanatique
- 1944: Coadjuteur
- 1948: Soritor
- 1961: Carteret
- 1964: Trade Mark
- 1966: Prompt
- 1967: Magic Wind
- 1968: Aslam
- 1973: Robertino
- 1974: Mount Hagen
- 1975: Condorcet
- 1976: Far North
- 1977: Water Boy
- 1978: Kenmare

== See also ==
- List of French flat horse races
- Recurring sporting events established in 1901 – this race is included under its original title, Prix de Saint-Cloud.
