= Alzao =

American-bred Thoroughbred racehorse

- Sire: Lyphard
- Grandsire: Northern Dancer
- Dam: Lady Rebecca
- Damsire: Sir Ivor
- Sex: Stallion
- Foaled: 28 February 1980
- Country: United States
- Colour: Bay
- Breeder: Shira Racing, Ltd
- Owner: Jean-Luc Lagardère
- Trainer: Francois Boutin
- Record: 11: 4-1-1

Major wins
- Prix Matchem (1983); Premio Ellington (1984)

Awards
- Timeform rating 117 (1983)

Alzao (28 February 1980 – 19 July 2007) was an American-bred Thoroughbred racehorse and sire. He was trained in France during his racing career and won four races including the Prix Matchem and the Premio Ellington. After his retirement from racing he became a very successful breeding stallion who was noted for the quality of his female offspring.

== Background ==
Alzao was a "strong, compact" bay horse with a white blaze and white socks on his front legs bred in Kentucky by Shira Racing. He was sent to race in Europe where he entered the ownership of Jean-Luc Lagardère and was sent into training with Francois Boutin in France.

He was sired by Lyphard, an American-bred stallion who raced in France, winning the Prix Jacques Le Marois and Prix de la Forêt in 1972. Lyphard became a very successful breeding stallion in both Europe and North America, siring Three Troikas, Dancing Brave, Dancing Maid and Manila. Alzao's dam Lady Rebecca showed good racing ability, winning the Prix Vanteaux as a three-year-old in 1974. She was a half-sister to both Tom Rolfe and the Arlington Handicap winner Chieftain.

== Racing career ==
=== 1982: two-year-old season ===
Alzao made his racecourse debut in a contest for previously unraced juveniles over 1800 metres on soft ground at Evry Racecourse in October and won by two and a half lengths. Later that month the colt followed up in a 1600-metre race at Maisons-Laffitte Racecourse, leading from the start and winning by a length from Jabal Tarik. In the annual Racehorses of 1982 Timeform gave him a rating of 110, 23 pounds behind their top-rated two-year-old Diesis, and stated that he would "make a very useful middle-distance colt".

=== 1983: three-year-old season ===
On his first appearance of 1983 Alzao finished third behind Lovely Dancer and Jeu de Paille in the Prix de Courcelles over 2000 metres at Saint-Cloud Racecourse. In the Prix Matchem over 1800 metres at Evry in May he recorded his first major success as he held on to win by a neck from Ginger Brink. Later that month he came home fourth behind White Spade, Margouzed and Ginger Brink in the Prix La Force at Longchamp Racecourse. After a summer break Alzao returned in September and was matched against older horses La Coupe de Maisons-Laffitte in which he finished second, beaten half a length by the seven-year-old gelding Bylly The Kid. In October he was sent to England to contest the Group 1 Champion Stakes at Newmarket Racecourse and finished eighth of the nineteen runners behind Cormorant Wood beaten just over seven lengths by the winner.

=== 1984: four-year-old season ===
Alzao began his third campaign in the Prix de Ris-Orangis over 1600 metres at Evry in April and finished seventh behind Naishakar, beaten seven lengths by the winner. Later that month he sent to campaign in Italy and came home fourth behind Onslow in the Premio Aprile over 2000 metres at San Siro Racecourse in Milan. In May he was stepped up in distance for the Group 3 Premio Ellington over 2400 metres at Capannelle Racecourse in Rome and prevailed by a nose from Abdonski. At the end of the year he was rated 106 by Timeform.

== Stud record ==
At the end of his racing career Alzao became a breeding stallion at the Rathbarry Stud in Ireland. He later moved to the Coolmore Stud and was also shuttled to stand in Australia. He made an immediate impact by siring the Group 1 winners Pass the Peace and Alcando in his first season at stud. At one point in the late 1980s he was the most popular stallion in England with breeders. He was pensioned from stud duty in January 2006 and spent his retirement at the Castlehyde Stud. Alzao died on 19 July 2007.

Alzao's daughters did better on the track than his sons and he became an important sire of broodmares. He has had an enduring influence on Japanese pedigrees through his daughter Wind In Her Hair, the dam of Deep Impact and Black Tide (sire of Kitasan Black). Another of his daughters Acidanthera produced Olympic Glory.

=== Major winners ===
c = colt, f = filly, g = gelding

Foaled	Name	Sex	Major wins
1986	Pass the Peace	f	Cheveley Park Stakes
1986	Alcando	f	Beverly Hills Handicap
1988	Capricciosa	f	Moyglare Stud Stakes, Cheveley Park Stakes
1988	Second Set	c	Sussex Stakes
1990	Anusha	m	Ladbrokes Hurdle
1991	Alpride	f	Beverly Hills Handicap, Yellow Ribbon Invitational Stakes
1991	Wind in Her Hair	f	Aral-Pokal
1993	Matiya	f	Irish 1,000 Guineas
1993	Waky Nao	c	Premio Vittorio di Capua
1995	Alborada	f	Champion Stakes x 2
1995	Shahtoush	f	Epsom Oaks
1995	Winona	f	Irish Oaks
1995	Alcazar	g	Prix Royal Oak
1999	Albanova	f	Deutschland Preis, Rheinland-Pokal, Preis von Europa
2000	Al Eile	g	Aintree Hurdle x 3, December Festival Hurdle
2001	Angara	f	Beverly D. Stakes, Diana Handicap

== Pedigree ==
Pedigree of Alzao (USA), bay stallion, 1980
Sire Lyphard (USA) 1969	Northern Dancer (CAN); 1961	Nearctic	Nearco (ITY)
Sire Lyphard (USA) 1969	Northern Dancer (CAN); 1961	Nearctic	Lady Angela (GB)
Sire Lyphard (USA) 1969	Northern Dancer (CAN); 1961	Natalma (USA)	Native Dancer
Sire Lyphard (USA) 1969	Northern Dancer (CAN); 1961	Natalma (USA)	Almahmoud
Sire Lyphard (USA) 1969	Goofed (USA); 1960	Court Martial (GB)	Fair Trial
Sire Lyphard (USA) 1969	Goofed (USA); 1960	Court Martial (GB)	Instantaneous
Sire Lyphard (USA) 1969	Goofed (USA); 1960	Barra (FR)	Formor
Sire Lyphard (USA) 1969	Goofed (USA); 1960	Barra (FR)	La Favorite
Dam Lady Rebecca (GB) 1971	Sir Ivor (USA); 1965	Sir Gaylord	Turn-To (IRE)
Dam Lady Rebecca (GB) 1971	Sir Ivor (USA); 1965	Sir Gaylord	Somethingroyal
Dam Lady Rebecca (GB) 1971	Sir Ivor (USA); 1965	Attica	Mr Trouble
Dam Lady Rebecca (GB) 1971	Sir Ivor (USA); 1965	Attica	Athenia
Dam Lady Rebecca (GB) 1971	Pocahontas (USA); 1955	Roman	Sir Gallahad (FR)
Dam Lady Rebecca (GB) 1971	Pocahontas (USA); 1955	Roman	Buckup (GB)
Dam Lady Rebecca (GB) 1971	Pocahontas (USA); 1955	How	Princequillo (IRE)
Dam Lady Rebecca (GB) 1971	Pocahontas (USA); 1955	How	The Squaw (FR) (Family: 9-h)
