= Capricciosa =

Irish-bred Thoroughbred racehorse

- Sire: Alzao
- Grandsire: Lyphard
- Dam: Clanjingle
- Damsire: Tumble Wind
- Sex: Mare
- Foaled: 2 March 1988
- Country: Ireland
- Colour: Bay
- Breeder: M Maguire
- Owner: Robert Sangster
- Trainer: Vincent O'Brien
- Record: 7: 4-0-0
- Earnings: £214,091

Major wins
- Debutante Stakes (1990); Moyglare Stud Stakes (1990); Cheveley Park Stakes (1990)

Capricciosa (foaled 2 March 1988) was an Irish Thoroughbred racehorse and broodmare. In a racing career which lasted from June 1990 until April 1992 she won four of her seven races. She was one of the best juvenile fillies in Britain and Ireland in 1990 when she won four races including the Debutante Stakes, Moyglare Stud Stakes and Cheveley Park Stakes. She missed the whole of the next season and was then sent to race in the United States where she made no impact in two starts. She was retired from racing to become a broodmare in Japan and produced at least eleven winners.

== Background ==
Capricciosa was a bay mare bred in Ireland by M Maguire. She was sired by Alzao, a son of Lyphard who never won above Group Three level, but became a successful breeding stallion, his progeny including Alborada, Second Set and Shahtoush. Capricciosa was the best racehorse produced her dam, the unraced Clanjingle who was descended from the influential broodmare Molly Desmond.

The filly was acquired by the British businessman Robert Sangster and was sent into training with Vincent O'Brien at Ballydoyle. She was ridden in all of her European races by John Reid.

== Racing career ==
=== 1990: two-year-old season ===
On her racecourse debut, Capricciosa started 9/2 second favourite for a maiden race over five furlongs at the Curragh on 30 June 1990. She won by two and a half lengths from the Dermot Weld-trained favourite Inishdalla with four lengths back to the Jim Bolger-trained Noora Park in third. The filly was moved up sharply in class for the Group One Heinz "57" Phoenix Stakes at Phoenix Park Racecourse on 12 August. She started the joint second favourite on 5/1 but finished tenth of the thirteen runners behind the British-trained colt Mac's Imp. Twelve days after her poor run at Phoenix Park, the filly recorded her first important success when she started 11/10 favourite for the Group Three Debutante Stakes over the same course and distance and won by two lengths from Inishdalla.

On 9 September Capricciosa faced Inishdalla yet again in the Group One Moyglare Stud Stakes over six furlongs at the Curragh. The other fancied runners included the John Oxx-trained Isle of Glass, Capricciosa's stable companion African Dance and the British challengers Zigaura (placed in the Cherry Hinton Stakes and the Princess Margaret Stakes) and Jameelaty (runner-up in the Sweet Solera Stakes). Capricciosa won by three quarters of a length and half a length from Inishdalla and Zigaura.

On her final appearance of the season, Capricciosa was sent to England for the Group One Cheveley Park over six furlongs at Newmarket Racecourse on 3 October. The French-trained Divine Danse (winner of the Prix d'Arenberg) started favourite ahead of Imperfect Circle (Firth of Clyde Stakes) with Capricciosa next in the betting on 7/1. The other eight runners included Zigaura and the Lowther Stakes winner Only Yours. Reid sent the Irish filly into the lead from the start before accelerating a furlong out. Capricciosa kept on well in the closing stages to hold off the challenge of Imperfect Circle and win by three quarters of a length with two and a half lengths back to Divine Danse in third.

=== 1992: four-year-old season ===
Capricciosa missed the whole of the 1991 season with training problems and injuries. In 1992 she was relocated to race in the United States where she was trained by Gary F. Jones. On her North American debut she finished fifth in an allowance race at Santa Anita Park in February. On her final appearance she contested the Grade III Las Cienegas Handicap over six and a half furlongs at the same track on 4 April and finished sixth behind Heart of Joy.

== Breeding record ==
Capricciosa was retired from racing to become a broodmare in Japan. She has produced seventeen foals and eleven winners between 1993 and 2011:

- Saint Aria, a bay colt, foaled in 1993, sired by Woodman. Won one race.
- Brand Carey, bay filly, 1994, by Sakura Yutaka O. Won four races.
- Saint Heart, bay colt, 1995, by Nihon Pillow Winner. Unraced.
- Nishino Erhab, bay filly, 1996, by Erhaab. Won three races.
- Nishino Perugia, bay filly, 1997, by Sakura Bakushin O. Second on her only start.
- Nishino Romanesque, brown colt, 1998, by Paradise Creek. Unraced.
- Nishino Al Capone, brown colt, 1999, by Sunday Silence. Won one race.
- Nishinoichibanbosi, bay colt, 2000, by Sakura Laurel. Won two races.
- Nishino Hokiboshi, bay colt, 2001, by Forty Niner. Won one race.
- Nishino Julietta, filly, 2003, by Mejiro McQueen. Failed to win in three races.
- Nishino Blue Moon, bay filly, 2004, by Tanino Gimlet. Won six races including the Grade III Nakayama Himba Stakes.
- T M De Sky, colt, 2005, by Seiun Sky. Won one race.
- Speculator, bay colt (later gelded), 2006, by Forty Niner. Failed to win in nine races.
- Meine Black Tea, brown filly, 2007, by Roses In May. Won twelve races.
- Meiner Liberte, colt, 2008, by Alkaased. Unplaced on only start.
- Beyond the World, colt, 2009, by Brian's Time. Won four races.
- Nonno, bay filly, 2011, by Alkaased. Won four races.

Capricciosa was "put out of stud" as of June 2013.

== Pedigree ==
Pedigree of Capricciosa (IRE), bay mare, 1988
Sire Alzao (USA) 1980	Lyphard (USA); 1969	Northern Dancer	Nearctic
Sire Alzao (USA) 1980	Lyphard (USA); 1969	Northern Dancer	Natalma
Sire Alzao (USA) 1980	Lyphard (USA); 1969	Goofed	Court Martial
Sire Alzao (USA) 1980	Lyphard (USA); 1969	Goofed	Barra
Sire Alzao (USA) 1980	Lady Rebecca (GB); 1971	Sir Ivor	Sir Gaylord
Sire Alzao (USA) 1980	Lady Rebecca (GB); 1971	Sir Ivor	Attica
Sire Alzao (USA) 1980	Lady Rebecca (GB); 1971	Pocahontas	Roman
Sire Alzao (USA) 1980	Lady Rebecca (GB); 1971	Pocahontas	How
Dam Clanjingle (GB) 1980	Tumble Wind (USA); 1964	Restless Wind	Windy City
Dam Clanjingle (GB) 1980	Tumble Wind (USA); 1964	Restless Wind	Lump Sugar
Dam Clanjingle (GB) 1980	Tumble Wind (USA); 1964	Easy Stages	Endeavour
Dam Clanjingle (GB) 1980	Tumble Wind (USA); 1964	Easy Stages	Saturday Off
Dam Clanjingle (GB) 1980	Fille Sifflante (GB); 1965	Whistler	Panorama
Dam Clanjingle (GB) 1980	Fille Sifflante (GB); 1965	Whistler	Farthing Damages
Dam Clanjingle (GB) 1980	Fille Sifflante (GB); 1965	Polly Gilles	Gilles de Retz
Dam Clanjingle (GB) 1980	Fille Sifflante (GB); 1965	Polly Gilles	Miss Polly (Family: 14-c)
