= Bering (horse) =

British-bred Thoroughbred racehorse

- Racing silks of Mrs Alec Head
- Sire: Arctic Tern
- Grandsire: Sea-Bird
- Dam: Beaune
- Damsire: Lyphard
- Sex: Stallion
- Foaled: 20 March 1983
- Country: Great Britain
- Colour: Chestnut
- Breeder: Alec Head
- Owner: Alec Head
- Trainer: Criquette Head
- Jockey: Freddy Head; Gary Moore
- Record: 7: 5-1-1
- Earnings: €519.468

Major wins
- Prix Noailles (1986); Prix Hocquart (1986); Prix du Jockey Club (1986); Prix Niel (1986)

Awards
- Timeform rating: 136

Bering (20 March 1983 – 16 December 2011) was a British-bred, French-trained Thoroughbred racehorse. He achieved five victories out of his seven starts, including a win in the Prix du Jockey Club in 1986. In his final race, he finished second to Dancing Brave in the Prix de l'Arc de Triomphe. Bering was bred and owned by Alec Head and trained by his daughter, Criquette Head. Following his retirement from racing, Bering had success as a stallion, siring notable progeny such as Pennekamp, the winner of the 2000 Guineas Stakes, and American Post, the victor of the Poule d'Essai des Poulains.

== Background ==
Bering was a chestnut colt bred by Alec Head and foaled in 1983. He was sired by Arctic Tern, the winner of the Prix Ganay in 1977. His dam, Beaune, was a stakes-winning daughter of Lyphard.

== Racing career ==
=== 1985: Two-year-old season ===
In his first Bering finished third in a 1,600 metre race at Longchamp on 5 October 1985. He followed this up a month later by winning a 1,700 metre race at Maisons-Laffitte. He was ridden by Freddy Head on both of his races as a two-year-old.

=== 1986: Three-year-old season ===
Bering started the 1986 season by winning the Prix Noailles by eight lengths from Point D'Artois in April. In May he then took the Prix Hocquart, again beating Point D'Artois, this timeby two lengths. After these two victories he was sent off as the odds-on favourite for the Prix du Jockey Club over 2,400 metres at Chantilly. Art Francais set off in the lead at a fast past, at one point being ten lengths clear of the rest of the field. As they entered the finishing straight, Pradier took the lead, whilst Bering was moving through into third position. Bering took the lead with about 400 metres left to run and was never caught, winning by one and a half lengths from Altayan. Bering ran the race in a time of 2 minutes and 24.10 seconds, which beat the race record set by Top Ville in 1979 by 1.2 seconds. Gary Moore said after the race "I knew we were going to win 400m-600m out and all he needed was a couple of smacks."

As preparation for the Prix de l'Arc de Triomphe Bering raced in the Prix Niel at Longchamp, which he won by two and a half lengths from Malakim. In his final race Bering took on a strong field in the Prix de l'Arc de Triomphe. He was ridden by Gary Moore, as he had been throughout his three-year-old career. Bering was leading the race well into the closing stages until he was overtaken by Dancing Brave with about 100 metres left to run. Dancing Brave won the race by one and a half lengths from Bering. Bering finished one and a half lengths ahead of Triptych, who just beat Shahrastani for third place.

== Assessment ==
Timeform rated Bering at 136, making him the second highest rated three-year-old of 1986, behind only Dancing Brave (rated 140).

== Stud career ==
After the 1986 season Bering was retired to stud. He initially stood at Walmac International for a fee of $75,000. In 1992 he moved back to France to stand at Haras du Quesnay near Deauville. Bering retired from stud duty in 2009 and died on 16 December 2011, aged 28. At the time of his death he had sired 77 winners of stakes races. His most notable progeny are listed below.

=== Notable progeny ===
s = stallion, m = mare, g = gelding

Foaled	Name	Sex	Major Wins	Ref.
1988	Peter Davies	s	Racing Post Trophy
1988	Serrant	g	Grand Prix d'Évry, Prix Maurice de Nieuil
1988	Steamer Duck	s	Gran Criterium
1991	Signe Divin	s	Critérium de Maisons-Laffitte
1992	Matiara	m	Poule d'Essai des Pouliches, Ramona Handicap
1992	Pennekamp	s	Prix de la Salamandre, Dewhurst Stakes, 2000 Guineas Stakes
1994	Vertical Speed	s	Prix Hubert de Chaudenay
1995	Glorosia	m	Fillies' Mile
1995	Miss Berbere	m	Prix d'Astarte
1996	Moiava	m	Critérium de Maisons-Laffitte
1996	Puntal	g	Dovecote Novices' Hurdle, Betfred Gold Cup
2001	American Post	s	Prix Jean-Luc Lagardère, Racing Post Trophy, Poule d'Essai des Poulains
2003	French Opera	g	Future Champion Novices' Chase, Game Spirit Chase, Celebration Chase

Bering was also the damsire of Harbinger, who in 2010 was rated as the best horse in the world in the World Thoroughbred Racehorse Rankings.

== Pedigree ==
Pedigree of Bering, chestnut stallion, 1983
Sire Arctic Tern ch. 1973	Sea-Bird ch. 1962	Dan Cupid ch. 1956	Native Dancer
Sire Arctic Tern ch. 1973	Sea-Bird ch. 1962	Dan Cupid ch. 1956	Vixenette
Sire Arctic Tern ch. 1973	Sea-Bird ch. 1962	Sicalade b. 1956	Sicambre
Sire Arctic Tern ch. 1973	Sea-Bird ch. 1962	Sicalade b. 1956	Marmelade
Sire Arctic Tern ch. 1973	Bubbling Beauty ch. 1961	Hasty Road b. 1951	Roman
Sire Arctic Tern ch. 1973	Bubbling Beauty ch. 1961	Hasty Road b. 1951	Traffic Court
Sire Arctic Tern ch. 1973	Bubbling Beauty ch. 1961	Almahmoud ch. 1947	Mahmoud
Sire Arctic Tern ch. 1973	Bubbling Beauty ch. 1961	Almahmoud ch. 1947	Arbitrator
Dam Beaune (FR) ch. 1974	Lyphard b. 1969	Northern Dancer b. 1961	Nearctic
Dam Beaune (FR) ch. 1974	Lyphard b. 1969	Northern Dancer b. 1961	Natalma
Dam Beaune (FR) ch. 1974	Lyphard b. 1969	Goofed ch. 1960	Court Martial
Dam Beaune (FR) ch. 1974	Lyphard b. 1969	Goofed ch. 1960	Barra II
Dam Beaune (FR) ch. 1974	Barbra br. 1969	Le Fabuleux ch. 1961	Wild Risk
Dam Beaune (FR) ch. 1974	Barbra br. 1969	Le Fabuleux ch. 1961	Anguar
Dam Beaune (FR) ch. 1974	Barbra br. 1969	Biobelle b. 1960	Cernobbio
Dam Beaune (FR) ch. 1974	Barbra br. 1969	Biobelle b. 1960	La Beloli

Note: b. = Bay, br. = Brown, ch. = Chestnut
