= Prix de Fontainebleau =

Flat horse race in France

- Class: Group 3
- Location: Longchamp Racecourse; Paris, France
- Inaugurated: 1889
- Race type: Flat / Thoroughbred
- Website: france-galop.com

Race information
- Distance: 1,600 metres (1 mile)
- Surface: Turf
- Track: Right-handed
- Qualification: Three-year-old colts and geldings
- Weight: 58 kg
- Purse: €80,000 (2020); 1st: €40,000

Prix de Fontainebleau
2025
Ridari	Sahlan	Misunderstood

Previous years
2024
Ramadan	Beauvatier	Grey Man
2023
American Flag	Marhaba Ya Sanafi	Rajapour
2022
Welwal	Mathletic	Making Moovies
2021
Policy Of Truth	Sealiway	Summiter

2020-2011
2020
The Summit	Ecrivain	Victor Ludorum
2019
Persian King	Epic Hero	Duke Of Hazzard
2018
Wootton	Olmedo	Louis D'Or
2017
Brametot	Stunning Spirit	Spotify
2016
Dicton	Taareef	Almanzor
2015
Territories	Karar	The Commissioner
2014
Ectot	Karakontie	Galiway
2013
Gengis	Morandi	Kitaya
2012
Dragon Pulse	Dabirsim	Sofast
2011
Glaswegian	Rosanabad	Tin Horse

2010-2001
2010
Rajsaman	Siyouni	Lope De Vega
2009
Silver Frost	Super Pistachio	Oiseau De Feu
2008
Tamayuz	Murcielago	Hello Morning
2007
Chichi Creasy	Battle Paint	Visionario
2006
Stormy River	Light Of Joy	Dream In Blue
2005
Laverock	Melanosporum	Zenon
2004
American Post	Blackdoun	Diamond Green
2003
Clodovil	Shuttle Diplomacy	Snipewalk
2002
Bowman	Medecis	Landseer
2001
Denon	Tarzan Cry	Okawango

2000-1990
2000
Berine's Son	Premier Pas	Slipstream King
1999
Indian Danehill	Le Roi Chic	Grazalema
1998
With The Flow	Loudeac	Pinmix
1997
Daylami	Loup Sauvage	Fine Fellow
1996
Ashkalani	Eternity Range	Spinning World
1995
Atticus	Petit Poucet	Kirdoun
1994
Fadeyev	Brave Note	Goldmine
1993
Zieten	Semillon	Danakal
1992
Rainbow Corner	Highest Ody	Judge Decision
1991
Hector Protector	Acteur Francais	Crack Regiment
1990
Linamix	Septieme Ciel	Jade Robbery

The Prix de Fontainebleau is a Group 3 flat horse race in France open to three-year-old thoroughbred colts and geldings. It is run over a distance of 1,600 metres (about 1 mile) at Longchamp in April.

== History ==
The event is named after Fontainebleau Forest, the location of the Hippodrome de la Solle racecourse. The Société d'Encouragement organised an annual race meeting at the venue from 1862 to 1891.

The Prix de Fontainebleau was introduced at Longchamp in 1889. It was originally a 2,200-metre contest restricted to horses having their first race of the season.

The modern Prix de Fontainebleau was established in 1952. It was initially run over 1,600 metres, and designed to serve as a trial for the first colts' Classics of the year. The first winner, Thunderhead, subsequently won the 2,000 Guineas in England.

The race's distance was modified several times during the 1960s. It was run over 1,400 metres (1965), 1,300 metres (1966) and 1,500 metres (1967) before reverting to 1,600 metres in 1968.

Seventeen winners of the modern Prix de Fontainebleau have achieved victory in the Poule d'Essai des Poulains. The first was Neptunus in 1964, and the most recent was Brametot in 2017. The most recent Poule d'Essai des Poulains winner to run in the Prix de Fontainebleau was Victor Ludorum, fourth in 2020.

The race was opened to geldings from the 2020 running.

== Records ==
Leading jockey since 1952 (6 wins):

- Maurice Philipperon – Farabi (1967), Blinis (1971), Arctic Tern (1976), Irish River (1979), Castle Guard (1983), Kendor (1989)

Leading trainer since 1952 (10 wins):

- André Fabre – Soviet Star (1987), Rainbow Corner (1992), Zieten (1993), Fadeyev (1994), Indian Danehill (1999), Berine's Son (2000), Bowman (2002), Clodovil (2003), Territories (2015), Persian King (2019)

Leading owner since 1952 (4 wins):

- Gertrude Widener – Aerodynamic (1961), Prudent (1962), Grey Dawn (1965), Timmy My Boy (1968)
- HH Aga Khan IV – Blushing Groom (1977), Ashkalani (1996), Daylami (1997), Rajsaman (2010)

== Winners since 1974 ==
Year	Winner	Jockey	Trainer	Owner	Time
1974	Mount Hagen	Yves Saint-Martin	Angel Penna	Daniel Wildenstein	1:43.20
1975	Monsanto	Yves Saint-Martin	Angel Penna	Daniel Wildenstein
1976	Arctic Tern	Maurice Philipperon	John Fellows	Mrs John Knight	1:45.00
1977	Blushing Groom	Henri Samani	François Mathet	HH Aga Khan IV	1:49.00
1978	Kenmare	Alain Badel	François Mathet	Guy de Rothschild	1:48.60
1979	Irish River	Maurice Philipperon	John Cunnington Jr.	Mrs Raymond Adès	1:50.60
1980	Nice Havrais	Freddy Head	François Boutin	Alan Clore
1981	Cresta Rider	Philippe Paquet	François Boutin	Stavros Niarchos
1982	Melyno	Yves Saint-Martin	François Mathet	Stavros Niarchos	1:45.40
1983	Castle Guard	Maurice Philipperon	John Fellows	Peter Richards
1984	Mendez	Cash Asmussen	François Boutin	Philip Niarchos	1:47.60
1985	No Pass No Sale	Alfred Gibert	Robert Collet	René Aubert	1:50.40
1986	Fast Topaze	Cash Asmussen	Georges Mikhalidès	Mahmoud Fustok	1:46.70
1987	Soviet Star	Greville Starkey	André Fabre	Sheikh Mohammed	1:42.10
1988	Blushing John	Freddy Head	François Boutin	Allen Paulson	1:41.70
1989	Kendor	Maurice Philipperon	Raymond Touflan	Adolf Bader	1:43.10
1990	Linamix	Gérald Mossé	François Boutin	Jean-Luc Lagardère	1:43.60
1991	Hector Protector	Freddy Head	François Boutin	Stavros Niarchos	1:41.50
1992	Rainbow Corner	Pat Eddery	André Fabre	Khalid Abdullah	1:41.10
1993	Zieten	Thierry Jarnet	André Fabre	Sheikh Mohammed	1:44.20
1994	Fadeyev	Thierry Jarnet	André Fabre	Maktoum Al Maktoum	1:47.00
1995	Atticus	Olivier Doleuze	Criquette Head	Jacques Wertheimer	1:43.10
1996	Ashkalani	Gérald Mossé	Alain de Royer-Dupré	HH Aga Khan IV	1:38.40
1997	Daylami	Gérald Mossé	Alain de Royer-Dupré	HH Aga Khan IV	1:39.80
1998	With the Flow	Olivier Doleuze	Criquette Head	Marshall Jenney	1:50.20
1999	Indian Danehill	Olivier Peslier	André Fabre	Edouard de Rothschild	1:48.00
2000	Berine's Son	Christophe Soumillon	André Fabre	Edouard de Rothschild	1:52.80
2001	Denon	Thierry Jarnet	Jonathan Pease	Niarchos Family	1:50.20
2002	Bowman	Olivier Peslier	André Fabre	Sheikh Mohammed	1:40.70
2003	Clodovil	Olivier Plaçais	André Fabre	Lagardère Family	1:44.00
2004	American Post	Christophe Soumillon	Criquette Head-Maarek	Khalid Abdullah	1:38.50
2005	Laverock	Miguel Blancpain	Carlos Laffon-Parias	Maktoum Al Maktoum	1:45.40
2006	Stormy River	Thierry Thulliez	Nicolas Clément	Ecurie Mister Ess A S	1:38.20
2007	Chichi Creasy	Ronan Thomas	Nicole Rossio	Béatrice Rossio	1:38.20
2008	Tamayuz	Davy Bonilla	Freddy Head	Hamdan Al Maktoum	1:48.30
2009	Silver Frost	Olivier Peslier	Yves de Nicolay	John Cotton	1:39.49
2010	Rajsaman	Thierry Jarnet	Alain de Royer-Dupré	HH Aga Khan IV	1:39.36
2011	Glaswegian (Note: The 2011 winner Glaswegian was later exported to Hong Kong and renamed Beauty Lead)	Stéphane Pasquier	Pascal Bary	Khalid Abdullah	1:39.69
2012	Dragon Pulse	Grégory Benoist	Mikel Delzangles	Tan Kai Chah	1:40.73
2013	Gengis	Stéphane Pasquier	Georges Doleuze	Claire Stephenson	1:44.08
2014	Ectot	Grégory Benoist	Élie Lellouche	Augustin-Normand / Vidal	1:39.13
2015	Territories	Mickael Barzalona	André Fabre	Godolphin SNC	1:40.80
2016	Dicton (Note: The 2016 and 2017 races took place at Chantilly while Longchamp was closed for redevelopment)	Olivier Peslier	Gianluca Bietolini	Robert Ng	1:38.20
2017	Brametot	Cristian Demuro	Jean-Claude Rouget	Augustin-Normand / Vidal	1:35.18
2018	Wootton	Mickael Barzalona	Henri-Alex Pantall	Godolphin	1:47.38
2019	Persian King	Pierre-Charles Boudot	André Fabre	Godolphin / Ballymore	1:36.41
2020	The Summit	Pierre-Charles Boudot	Henri-Alex Pantall	Mme Jacques Cygler	1:42.51
2021	Policy of Truth	Maxime Guyon	Pia and Joakim Brandt	Logis Saint Germain / Brandt	1:39.68
2022	Welwal	Cristian Demuro	Jean-Claude Rouget	Al Shaqab Racing	1:38.17
2023	American Flag	Christophe Soumillon	Yann Barberot	Malcolm Parrish	1:44.64
2024	Ramadan (Note: The 2024 winner Ramadan was later exported to Hong Kong.)	Aurélien Lemaitre	Christopher Head	Nurlan Bizakov	1:42.31
2025	Ridari	Mickael Barzalona	Mikel Delzangles	Exors of HH Aga Khan IV	1:38.02
2026	Komorebi	Alexis Pouchin	André Fabre	Godolphin	1:36.04

== Earlier winners ==
- 1889: Amazon
- 1890: Yellow
- 1891: Closerie
- 1892: Diarbek
- 1893: Brocart
- 1894: Le Pompon
- 1895: Salambo
- 1896: Pas de Danse
- 1897: Nisard
- 1898: Volnay
- 1899: Fourire
- 1900: Ivry
- 1901: Quartier Mestre
- 1902: Retz
- 1903: Alpha
- 1904: Lorlot
- 1905: Saint Michel
- 1906: Organiste
- 1907: Calomel
- 1908: Quintette
- 1909: Negofol
- 1910: Aloes III
- 1911: Made in England
- 1912: De Viris
- 1913: Riverain
- 1914: Oreste
- 1920: Sourbier
- 1921: Vespertilion
- 1922: Gaurisankar
- 1923: Mackenzie
- 1924: Indra
- 1925: The Sirdar
- 1926: War Mist
- 1927: Lusignan
- 1928: Whirligig
- 1929: Paris Voyeur
- 1930: Commanderie
- 1931: Fondor
- 1932: Macaroni
- 1933: Le Cacique
- 1934: Duplex
- 1935: Peut Etre
- 1936: Genetout
- 1937: Le Calme
- 1938: Cor de Chasse
- 1939: Mon Tresor
- 1940: Prince Igor
- 1941: Rhodora
- 1942: Warrior
- 1943: Sextidi
- 1944: Prince Bio
- 1945: Chanteur
- 1947: Solina
- 1948: Turmoil
- 1952: Thunderhead
- 1953: Tosco
- 1954: Ferriol
- 1955: Chargeur
- 1956: Tenareze
- 1957: Franc Luron
- 1958: Pantouflard
- 1959: Javelot
- 1960: Bondolfi
- 1961: Aerodynamic
- 1962: Prudent
- 1963: Manderley
- 1964: Neptunus
- 1965: Grey Dawn
- 1966: Barbare
- 1967: Farabi
- 1968: Timmy My Boy
- 1969: Le Mas Marvent
- 1970: Breton
- 1971: Blinis
- 1972: Hard to Beat
- 1973: African Sky

== See also ==
- List of French flat horse races
