= Hector Protector =

American-bred Thoroughbred racehorse

- Sire: Woodman
- Grandsire: Mr. Prospector
- Dam: Korveya
- Damsire: Riverman
- Sex: Stallion
- Foaled: 1988
- Country: United States
- Colour: Chestnut
- Breeder: Flaxman Holdings Ltd
- Owner: Stavros Niarchos
- Trainer: François Boutin
- Record: 12: 9-0-0
- Earnings: £590,086

Major wins
- Prix La Flèche (1990); Prix de Cabourg (1990); Prix Morny (1990); Prix de la Salamandre (1990); Grand Critérium (1990); Poule d'Essai des Poulains (1991); Prix de Fontainebleau (1991); Prix Jacques Le Marois (1991)

Hector Protector (foaled 1988 in Kentucky) was an American-bred, French-trained Thoroughbred racehorse and top sire of racehorses in Japan. He was a full brother to the Champion filly Bosra Sham, who was trained by Henry Cecil. She was a champion miler and despite her bad feet she won the 1000 Guineas Stakes G1 over 1600 meters. The great trainer Henry Cecil considered her to be the best filly he ever trained. He was the leading European two-year-old of 1990 when he was undefeated in six races.

== Background ==
Hector Protector was a chestnut horse bred in Kentucky by Stavros Niarchos. He was conditioned for racing by François Boutin.

== Racing career ==
At age two, under jockey Freddy Head, Hector Protector won three Group One races, the 1990 Grand Critérium, Prix Morny, and the Prix de la Salamandre. Ridden by Head at age three, the colt finished fourth to winner Generous in the 1991 Epsom Derby in England. Back in France, he won two more Group Ones, the 1991 Poule d'Essai des Poulains and the Prix Jacques Le Marois.

== Stud record ==
Retired from racing, Hector Protector was purchased by Zenya Yoshida, the prominent Japanese horseman and owner of Shadai Farm in Shiraoi, Hokkaido. Yoshida brought him to stand at stud in Japan.

== Progeny ==
- Shiva
