= Arazi (horse) =

American-bred, French-trained Thoroughbred racehorse

- Sire: Blushing Groom
- Grandsire: Red God
- Dam: Danseur Fabuleux
- Damsire: Northern Dancer
- Sex: Stallion
- Foaled: 4 March 1989
- Died: 1 July 2021 (aged 32)
- Country: United States
- Colour: Chestnut
- Breeder: Ralph C. Wilson Jr.
- Owner: Allen Paulson; Sheikh Mohammed
- Trainer: François Boutin
- Record: 14: 9-1-1
- Earnings: $1,213,307

Major wins
- Prix La Flèche (1991); Prix du Bois (1991); Prix Robert Papin (1991); Prix Morny (1991); Prix de la Salamandre (1991); Grand Critérium (1991); Breeders' Cup Juvenile (1991); Prix Omnium II (1992); Prix du Rond Point (1992)

Awards
- American Champion Two-Year-Old Colt (1991); European Two Yr-Old Male Champion (1991); European Horse of the Year (1991)
- Last updated on June 27, 2011

Arazi (March 4, 1989 – July 1, 2021) was an American-bred, French-trained Thoroughbred racehorse who won the 1991 Breeders' Cup Juvenile.

== Background ==
A chestnut colt with a crooked white blaze on his face (like his grandsire, Northern Dancer), at 15.2 hands (62 inches, 157 cm) Arazi was a small horse by Thoroughbred standards. Bred by Ralph C. Wilson Jr., owner of the NFL Buffalo Bills, he was bought at the Keeneland Sales in Kentucky as a weanling for $350,000 by American businessman Allen E. Paulson. Chairman of Gulfstream Aerospace and a pilot, Paulson named the horse for the Arazi aeronautical navigational checkpoint in the Arizona desert. Paulson owned racing stables in the United States and Europe and he sent Arazi to France, where trainer François Boutin took charge of his conditioning.

== Racing career ==
=== 1991: two-year-old season ===
Ridden by jockey Gérald Mossé, in France, as a two-year-old Arazi won six of his first seven races, with an explosive come-from-behind style that was popular with spectators. In October, Paulson prepared to bring him to the United States for the 1991 Breeders' Cup. Prior to the race, Sheikh Mohammed Bin Rashid Al Maktoum made Paulson an offer of $9 million for a 50% share in Arazi.

Arazi competed in the 1991 Breeders' Cup Juvenile on November 2, 1991, at Churchill Downs in Louisville, Kentucky, ridden by American jockey Pat Valenzuela. Previously, seven European horses had won Breeders' Cup races, but all had been on grass; a number had failed to win a Breeders' Cup race on dirt. For Arazi, it was his first-ever race on dirt. The colt drew the outside post position, considered the least desirable spot in a field of 14 horses. Among the competitors in the Juvenile was the highly regarded California champion Bertrando, a future Eclipse Award winner, who came into the Breeders' Cup having won the Grade I Norfolk Stakes and the Del Mar Futurity.

Bertrando broke on an early lead and set a quick pace. By the time the field reached the far turn, Arazi was far back, more than a dozen lengths behind the front-running Bertrando. Suddenly, Arazi progressed through the field until he reached the third- and fourth-place horses. He moved between the two, swinging wide to pull up alongside Bertrando. At the top of the stretch, Arazi passed Bertrando and pulled away from the field. He was taken under a hard hold by his jockey and slowed as he crossed the finish line. As he did, NBC Sports race announcer Tom Durkin called, "Here indeed is a superstar!"

The win was the biggest winning margin in the history of the Breeders' Cup Juvenile. In 2006, the win was described as possibly "the single-most spectacular performance in Breeders' Cup history." Durkin later noted that Arazi could have won by as much as ten lengths had he not been slowed by his jockey. Arazi's performance earned a Timeform rating of 135, in comparison with an average two-year-old rating of 110 to 120. For his 1991 season, Arazi earned the United States Eclipse Award for Outstanding Two-Year-Old Male Horse, the Cartier Champion Two-year-old Colt, and Cartier Horse of the Year.

While Arazi's victory made him an early favorite for the 1992 Kentucky Derby, shortly after the Breeders' Cup his racing future was placed in doubt when the colt underwent arthroscopic surgery to remove chip fractures from the top joint of both knees. The operation was controversial; press reports suggested that Boutin thought it was a mistake. The operation was successful, and the colt was sent to recuperate at his home base at Lamorlaye, about 35 km north of Paris. Arazi's recovery took longer than Boutin had hoped, but five months later, transplanted American jockey Steve Cauthen won easily with him in the Prix Omnium II, 1,600 metres (5,200 ft) race on the grass at Hippodrome de Saint-Cloud.

=== 1992: three-year-old season ===
The pre-Kentucky Derby publicity for Arazi was compared to that of Silky Sullivan in 1958. Newspaper reporters and television crews met Arazi's plane at Louisville's Standiford Field. In interviews, jockey Steve Cauthen rated the colt in the same class as Affirmed, on whom he had won the U.S. Triple Crown in 1978. Jockey Patrick Valenzuela, who had ridden Arazi in his Breeders' Cup win and won the 1989 Derby aboard Sunday Silence said, "Arazi can do more [than Sunday Silence]." He added, "This race is over."

In the days leading up to the Kentucky Derby, press coverage of Arazi was extensive, and the racing world speculated as to whether the horse would remain in the United States in an attempt to win the Triple Crown or be shipped back to Europe to try to become the first Kentucky Derby champion to ever win England's Epsom Derby. The New York Times called the colt "mythical and almost mystical", and Time magazine stated, "Arazi is fast winning a reputation as the second coming of Secretariat". Joe Hirsch, with the Daily Racing Form said, "He [Arazi] is such an extraordinary animal that he makes other great horses look like hacks." )

For the 118th running of the Kentucky Derby on May 2, 1992, Arazi drew post position 17 in a field of 18 horses. The outside post meant he would begin the race from an auxiliary starting gate. Despite this handicap, bettors wagered as much on Arazi to win as on the other 17 horses combined. Having raced only once in the previous seven months (apart from the Prix Omnium at St Cloud), from the start of the Derby the energetic colt had to be kept under wraps by his jockey. Near the back of the field for most of the race, after the quarter pole Arazi made a quick move. Running eight horses wide, and mirroring his dramatic performance in the Breeders' Cup Juvenile, the colt flew past horse after horse with ABC television announcer Dave Johnson exclaiming, "Arazi is flying! - Arazi is gaining ground with every stride!" The colt moved into third place, tightly bunched with the leaders. But as they approached the homestretch, instead of pulling away as he had always done previously, Arazi tired and faded to finish eighth. Lil E. Tee, a little-known colt and an 18-1 longshot, won the race.

The racing world's consensus of Arazi's performance was that his knee surgery had affected his ability. Some blamed his poor showing on the fact that the colt had made only one prep start on soft grass before the Derby, while others} said he was a "miler" horse and the Derby's extra quarter-mile was too much for him. The upset spawned a book, The Longest Shot: Lil E. Tee and the Kentucky Derby, by Baltimore Sun sportswriter and racing commentator John Eisenberg.

Returning to France, Arazi raced four more times, where future U.S. Racing Hall of Fame inductee Steve Cauthen rode him to victory in the Group II Prix du Rond Point and the Prix Omnium II.

His final race was a return to the United States, where fans made him the 3-2 favorite in the Breeders' Cup Mile at Gulfstream Park. He finished 11th.

== Stud record ==
Arazi was retired to Sheikh Mohammed's horse breeding operation at Dalham Hall Stud in Newmarket, England. Later, Sheik Mohammed purchased Allen Paulson's 50% share and then moved Arazi to Three Chimneys Farm in Kentucky, before he was sent to a breeder in Japan in 1997. He then went to the Independent Stallion Station in Victoria, Australia, in 2003. Arazi spent one season at Swiss breeding facility Gestut Sohrenhof, returning to Independent Stallion Station in 2006. He sired a gray colt named Karazi, who won three races in France before being shipped to Del Mar for the 2007 season.

Among Arazi's offspring are Congaree, who won the 2001 Wood Memorial Stakes, the 2002 and 2003 Cigar Mile Handicap, and the 2003 Hollywood Gold Cup and Carter Handicap. The greatest part of his reputation as a stud may be as a broodmare sire; offspring from his daughters include the ill-fated Electrocutionist, winner of the Dubai World Cup who died of a heart attack at 5 in 2006; Lahudood, winner of the 2007 Breeders' Cup Filly & Mare Turf and Eclipse Award champion turf filly; Bribon, winner of the Grade I Metropolitan Handicap in 2009; and Americain, winner of the Melbourne Cup in 2010.

In September 2017 Arazi, aged 28, was reported to be enjoying his retirement at Stockwell Stud, Victoria, alongside Brief Truce, who beat him in the 1992 St James's Palace Stakes.

On July 1, 2021, it was announced that Arazi, aged 32, had died from age-related complications.

== Pedigree ==
Pedigree of Arazi (USA), chestnut stallion
Sire Blushing Groom	Red God	Nasrullah	Nearco
Sire Blushing Groom	Red God	Nasrullah	Mumtaz Begum
Sire Blushing Groom	Red God	Spring Run	Menow
Sire Blushing Groom	Red God	Spring Run	Boola Brook
Sire Blushing Groom	Runaway Bride	Wild Risk	Rialto
Sire Blushing Groom	Runaway Bride	Wild Risk	Wild Violet
Sire Blushing Groom	Runaway Bride	Aimee	Tudor Minstrel
Sire Blushing Groom	Runaway Bride	Aimee	Emali
Dam Danseur Fabuleux	Northern Dancer	Nearctic	Nearco
Dam Danseur Fabuleux	Northern Dancer	Nearctic	Lady Angela
Dam Danseur Fabuleux	Northern Dancer	Natalma	Native Dancer
Dam Danseur Fabuleux	Northern Dancer	Natalma	Almahmoud
Dam Danseur Fabuleux	Fabuleux Jane	Le Fabuleux	Wild Risk
Dam Danseur Fabuleux	Fabuleux Jane	Le Fabuleux	Anguar
Dam Danseur Fabuleux	Fabuleux Jane	Native Partner	Raise A Native
Dam Danseur Fabuleux	Fabuleux Jane	Native Partner	Dinner Partner
