= Winona (horse) =

Irish-bred Thoroughbred racehorse

- Sire: Alzao
- Grandsire: Lyphard
- Dam: My Potters
- Damsire: Irish River
- Sex: Mare
- Foaled: 21 March 1995
- Country: Ireland
- Colour: Bay
- Breeder: Newberry Stud Company
- Owner: Lady Clague
- Trainer: John Oxx
- Record: 9: 2-1-1
- Earnings: £137,283

Major wins
- Irish Oaks (1998)

Winona (21 March 1995 – after 2013) was an Irish Thoroughbred racehorse and broodmare best known for her win in the Irish Oaks. In a racing career which lasted from July 1997 until November 1998 she raced in four different countries and compiled a record of two wins one second and one third from nine starts. As a two-year-old in 1997 she showed considerable promise when winning on her first appearance and later finished second in the Group 3 C L Weld Park Stakes. In the following year she finished fourth in the Irish 1,000 Guineas and third in the Coronation Stakes before being stepped up in distance and recording an emphatic win in the Irish Oaks. She was well beaten in her last two races and was retired from racing at the end of the year. Her record as a broodmare was poor.

== Background ==
Winona was a bay mare bred in Ireland by the Newberry Stud Company. She was owned during her racing career by Lady Clague (born Margaret Isolin Cowley), the widow of entrepreneur Douglas Clague. The filly was trained at Kilcullen in County Kildare by John Oxx and ridden in all of her races by Johnny Murtagh.

She was sired by Alzao, a son of Lyphard who never won above Group Three level, but became a successful breeding stallion, with his other progeny including Alborada, Second Set and Shahtoush. Her dam, My Potters was a half-sister to My Juliet, Snaafi Dancer and Lyphard's Special. She was a female-line descendant of Ivabel, a half-sister to the Kentucky Derby winner Old Rosebud.

== Racing career ==
=== 1997: two-year-old season ===
Winona made her racecourse debut in a seven furlong maiden race at Leopardstown Racecourse on 19 July 1997. Starting at odds of 5/1 in a sixteen-runner field ahe took the lead approaching the final furlong and won "comfortably" by two lengths from the Aidan O'Brien-trained colt Desert Fox. The filly was then moved up sharply in class to contest the Group 1 Moyglare Stud Stakes over the same distance at the Curragh on 7 September, but despite starting second favourite she made little impact and came home tenth of the twelve runners behind Tarascon. She was back at the Curragh four weeks later for the C L Weld Park Stakes and produced a much better effort, finishing second to the British-trained favourite Alborada with Shahtoush in fourth place. Pat Smullen took the ride when Winona ended her season with a run in the Killavullan Stakes at Leopardstown on 27 October. Racing on softer ground than she had previously encountered she failed to show her best form and finished fifth behind Kincara Palace.

=== 1998: three-year-old season ===
Winona did not race as a three-year-old until 24 May when she started a 25/1 outsider for the Irish 1,000 Guineas over one mile at the Curragh. She was retrained by Murtagh and was still in ninth place with two furlongs left to ru but then stayed on strongly and finished fourth behind Tarascon, Kitza and the favoured La Nuit Rose. On 17 June she was sent to England for the Coronation Stakes at Royal Ascot and started a 16/1 outsider in a nine-runner field. As at the Curragh she kept on well in the closing stages and finished third behind Exclusive and Zalaiyka (winner of the Poule d'Essai des Pouliches). Winona was stepped up in distance to contest the Irish Oaks over one and a half miles at the Curragh on 12 July and started the 12/1 third favourite behind Bahr (runner-up in The Oaks), Glorosia and Kitza. After racing in fourth place and turning into the straight in third, she took the lead a furlong and a half out and drew right away to win in "impressive" style by seven lengths from Kitza. After the race Oxx said "We didn't know how good she really was. I wasn't certain she would stay a mile and a half and was no more than hopeful before the race, although she did stay on well over a mile, both here and at Ascot. I need not have worried. The pace wasn't all that fast and John was always well placed". Commenting on the margin of victory, Johnny Murtagh said "I couldn't hear anything behind me and there was no big screen to have a look!".

Winona failed to reproduce her Curragh form in two subsequent races. In the Prix Vermeille over 2400 metres on heavy ground at Longchamp Racecourse on 13 September she started 7/2 second favourite but finished ninth of the eleven runners behind Leggera. On her final start she was sent to California for the Yellow Ribbon Stakes at Santa Anita Park in November and came home eighth of the ten runners behind Fiji after fading in the straight.

== Breeding record ==
At the end of her racing career Winona was retired to become a broodmare for the Newberry Stud. She produced eight foals and two minor winners between 2001 and 2013.

- Nahane, a bay colt (later gelded), foaled in 2001, sired by Rainbow Quest. Failed to win in five races.
- En Passant, bay colt, 2002, by Danehill. Failed to win in four races.
- Masindi, bay filly, 2003, by Sinndar. Failed to win in two races.
- Grand Diamond, bay colt (gelded), 2004, by Grand Lodge. Won eight races from 113 starts.
- Bakula, bay filly, 2005, by Fasliyev. Unraced.
- Libanza, bay colt, 2006, by Sinndar. Failed to win in nine races.
- Dalanoni, bay colt (gelded), 2007, by Dalakhani. Failed to win in two races.
- Anything Goes, bay filly, 2009, by Nayef. Won one race.
- Windfall, bay filly, 2013, by Mull of Kintyre

== Pedigree ==
Pedigree of Winona (IRE), bay mare, 1995
Sire Alzao (USA) 1980	Lyphard (USA); 1969	Northern Dancer	Nearctic
Sire Alzao (USA) 1980	Lyphard (USA); 1969	Northern Dancer	Natalma
Sire Alzao (USA) 1980	Lyphard (USA); 1969	Goofed	Court Martial
Sire Alzao (USA) 1980	Lyphard (USA); 1969	Goofed	Barra
Sire Alzao (USA) 1980	Lady Rebecca (GB); 1971	Sir Ivor	Sir Gaylord
Sire Alzao (USA) 1980	Lady Rebecca (GB); 1971	Sir Ivor	Attica
Sire Alzao (USA) 1980	Lady Rebecca (GB); 1971	Pocahontas	Roman
Sire Alzao (USA) 1980	Lady Rebecca (GB); 1971	Pocahontas	How
Dam My Potters (USA) 1987	Irish River (FR); 1976	Riverman	Never Bend
Dam My Potters (USA) 1987	Irish River (FR); 1976	Riverman	River Lady
Dam My Potters (USA) 1987	Irish River (FR); 1976	Irish Star	Klairon
Dam My Potters (USA) 1987	Irish River (FR); 1976	Irish Star	Botany Bay
Dam My Potters (USA) 1987	My Bupers (USA); 1967	Bupers	Double Jay
Dam My Potters (USA) 1987	My Bupers (USA); 1967	Bupers	Busanda
Dam My Potters (USA) 1987	My Bupers (USA); 1967	Princess Revoked	Revoked
Dam My Potters (USA) 1987	My Bupers (USA); 1967	Princess Revoked	Miss Muffet (Family: 6-a)
