= Mac's Imp =

American-bred Thoroughbred racehorse

- Sire: Imp Society
- Grandsire: Barrera
- Dam: Flaming Reason
- Damsire: Limit To Reason
- Sex: Stallion (later gelded)
- Foaled: 12 February 1988
- Country: United States
- Colour: Bay
- Breeder: Brereton C Jones & Rodney P Carothers
- Owner: Tamdown Ltd
- Trainer: Bill O'Gorman
- Record: 10: 6-2-0
- Earnings: £200,967

Major wins
- Coventry Stakes (1990); Richmond Stakes (1990); Phoenix Stakes (1990)

Awards
- Timeform rating 116

Mac's Imp (12 February 1988 – 1996) was an American-bred, British-trained Thoroughbred racehorse and sire. As a two-year-old in 1990 he was one of the most successful colts of his generation in Europe, winning six of his eight races including the Coventry Stakes, Richmond Stakes and Phoenix Stakes. He failed to reproduce his juvenile form in two starts as a three-year-old and was retired from racing to become a breeding stallion. He had modest success as a sire of winners but was gelded in 1995 and died a year later.

== Background ==
Mac's Imp was a bay horse with a white sock on his left hind leg bred in Kentucky by Brereton C Jones & Rodney P Carothers. As a yearling he was consigned by Jones to the Keeneland September Yearling Sale where he was bought for $25,000 by the British racehorse trainer Bill O'Gorman. During his racing career he was owned by Tamdown Ltd (Michael McDonnell and Tom Mohan) and trained by O'Gorman at Newmarket, Suffolk. O'Gorman had built his reputation by training precociously fast two-year-olds, including Superpower and the 1984 British Horse of the Year Provideo. Mac's Imp was ridden in all but one of his races by Alan Munro.

He was sired by Imp Society, who won thirteen of his twenty-five races including the Oaklawn Handicap and Razorback Handicap. His dam Flaming Reason showed more modest racing ability, winning four minor events in a four-year track career. She was descended from Flaring Top (foaled 1947) an influential American broodmare who was the ancestor of many major winners including Nijinsky and The Minstrel.

== Racing career ==
=== 1990: two-year-old season ===
Mac's Imp made his racecourse debut in a maiden race over five furlongs at Nottingham Racecourse on 1 May in which he started the 4/9 favourite but finished second to Poet's Cove (later to win the Molecomb Stakes). He reappeared only four days later in a similar event at Newmarket and recorded his first success as he led from the start and won "comfortably" by five lengths. On 23 May he was moved up to six furlongs for a minor event at Goodwood Racecourse and won "easily" by eight lengths from three opponents. Three weeks later at Newbury he added a victory in the Kingsclere Stake, beating three opponents at odds of 4/6. Five days at his success at Newbury, Mac's Imp was moved up in class and started the 2/1 favourite against twelve opponents for the Group 3 Coventry Stakes at Royal Ascot. He led from the start and kept on well in the final furlong to win by two lengths from Generous.

In the following month at Newmarket, Mac's Imp started favourite for the July Stakes but after leading for most of the way he was overtaken approaching the final furlong and beaten into second place by Mujtahid. In the Richmond Stakes at Goodwood on 1 August the colt contested the Group 2 Richmond Stakes and started the 2/1 favourite ahead of six opponents including Time Gentleman (Railway Stakes) and Sylva Honda (Woodcote Stakes). After being briefly led by Mujadil, he went to the front after two furlongs and won by a length from Distinctly North, with three lengths back to Sylva Honda in third. Eleven days after his win at Goodwood, Macs Imp was sent to Ireland and faced Distinctly North again in the Group 1 Phoenix Stakes at Leopardstown Racecourse, where the other fancied runners included Capricciosa, On Tiptoes (Queen Mary Stakes) and Gypsy Fiddler (Windsor Castle Stakes). Starting the even money favourite, Mac's Imp prevailed by a neck from Distinctly North with a gap of three lengths back to the other eleven runners.

=== 1991: three-year-old season ===
Mac's Imp began his second campaign in a minor race over six furlongs at Thirsk Racecourse on 20 April. He started the 6/4 favourite but ran poorly and finished last of the eight runners, beaten almost twenty lengths by the winner Norton Challenger. Cash Asmussen took over from Munro when the colt was dropped to five furlongs for a race at Kempton in May. The change in jockey brought no improvement as Mac's Imp showed some "early speed" before fading to finish last of the six runners.

== Stud record ==
Mac's Imp was retired from racing to become a breeding stallion. After three years he was removed from stud duties and was gelded in July 1995. He died a year later at the age of eight. During his brief stud career he sired many minor winners as well as a few better class performers including the Phoenix Sprint Stakes winner March Star.

== Pedigree ==
Pedigree of Mac's Imp (USA), bay stallion, 1988
Sire Imp Society (USA) 1981	Barrera (USA); 1973	Raise a Native	Native Dancer
Sire Imp Society (USA) 1981	Barrera (USA); 1973	Raise a Native	Raise You
Sire Imp Society (USA) 1981	Barrera (USA); 1973	Minnetonka	Chieftain
Sire Imp Society (USA) 1981	Barrera (USA); 1973	Minnetonka	Heliolight
Sire Imp Society (USA) 1981	Trotta Sue (USA); 1966	Promised Land	Palestinian
Sire Imp Society (USA) 1981	Trotta Sue (USA); 1966	Promised Land	Mahmoudess
Sire Imp Society (USA) 1981	Trotta Sue (USA); 1966	Blue Norka	Blue Swords
Sire Imp Society (USA) 1981	Trotta Sue (USA); 1966	Blue Norka	Akron Girl
Dam Flaming Reason (USA) 1980	Limit To Reason (USA); 1968	Hail To Reason	Turn-To
Dam Flaming Reason (USA) 1980	Limit To Reason (USA); 1968	Hail To Reason	Nothirdchance
Dam Flaming Reason (USA) 1980	Limit To Reason (USA); 1968	Sailor's Hunch	Sailor
Dam Flaming Reason (USA) 1980	Limit To Reason (USA); 1968	Sailor's Hunch	Ouija
Dam Flaming Reason (USA) 1980	French Wind (USA); 1961	Menetrier	Fair Copy
Dam Flaming Reason (USA) 1980	French Wind (USA); 1961	Menetrier	La Melodie
Dam Flaming Reason (USA) 1980	French Wind (USA); 1961	Flaming Wind	Windfields
Dam Flaming Reason (USA) 1980	French Wind (USA); 1961	Flaming Wind	Flaring Top (Family: 8-f)
