= Maurice Philipperon =

French jockey

Maurice Philipperon is a noted French jockey who after retirement became president of the French jockeys' association. He is born on 20 march 1945.

His winning rides in Gr. 1 and 2 races included:

- the Prix Ganay in 1970, 1971 and 1980 on Grandier, Caro and Arctic Tern.
- the Poule d'Essai des Poulains in 1974, 1979 and 1989 on Moulines, Irish River and Kendor.
- the Prix du Moulin de Longchamp in 1977, 1979 and 1983 on Pharly, Irish River and Luth Enchantee.
- the Prix Lupin in 1977 and 1980 on Pharly and Belgio.
- the Poule d'Essai des Pouliches in 1970 and 1980 on Pampered Miss and Aryenne.
- the Prix Maurice de Gheest in 1982 and 1985 on Exclusive Order and Spectacular Joke.
- the Prix Jacques Le Marois in 1979 and 1983 on Irish River and Luth Enchantee.
- the Prix Morny in 1968, 1978, 1980 and 1987 on Princeline, Irish River, Ancien Régime and First Waltz.
- the Grand Critérium (now Prix Jean-Luc Lagardère) in 1979 and 1989 on Irish River and Kendor.
- the Prix d'Ispahan in 1979 and 1989 on Grandier and Irish River.
- the Prix de la Forêt in 1970 and 1976 on Stratege and Pharly.
- the Washington, D.C. International Stakes in 1974 on Admetus.
- the Grand Prix de Saint-Cloud in 1975 on Un Kopeck.
- the Prix du Cadran in 1980 on Shafaraz.
- the Critérium de Saint-Cloud in 1982 on Escaline.
- the Prix de la Salamandre in 1978 on Irish River.

He is the leading winning jockey (since 1952) in the Gr.3 Prix de Fontainebleau with six wins, Farabi (1967), Blinis (1971), Arctic Tern (1976), Irish River (1979), Castle Guard (1983), Kendor (1989), and the Gr. 3 Prix de Seine-et-Oise with five wins, Vertueuse (1963), King of Macedon (1978, 1979) and Parioli (1985, 1986).
