= Alborada (horse) =

British-bred Thoroughbred racehorse

- Sire: Alzao
- Grandsire: Lyphard
- Dam: Alouette
- Damsire: Darshaan
- Sex: Mare
- Foaled: 8 March 1995
- Country: United Kingdom
- Colour: Grey
- Breeder: Kirsten Rausing
- Owner: Kirsten Rausing
- Trainer: Mark Prescott
- Record: 10:6-1-2
- Earnings: £590,079

Major wins
- C. L. Weld Park Stakes (1997); Pretty Polly Stakes (1998); Nassau Stakes (1998); Champion Stakes (1998, 1999)

Alborada (8 March 1995 – February 2012) was a British Thoroughbred racehorse and broodmare best known for winning consecutive runnings of the Group One Champion Stakes at Newmarket Racecourse. In a racing career which lasted from July 1997 until October 1999 she won six of her ten races. In addition to her wins in the Champion Stakes she also won the C. L. Weld Park Stakes in 1997 and the Pretty Polly Stakes and the Nassau Stakes in 1998. Following her retirement from racing she had some success as a dam of winners.

== Background ==
Alborada was a grey mare bred by her owner Kirsten Rausing at the Lanwades Stud at Moulton near Newmarket. She was sired by Alzao, a son of Lyphard who never won above Group Three level, but became a successful breeding stallion, with his progeny including Maraahel (Hardwicke Stakes), Winona, Second Set and Shahtoush. Alborada's dam Alouette, from whom she inherited her grey colour, won three races including the Listed Oyster Stakes at Galway Racecourse in 1993 and was a half-sister of the Doncaster Cup-winning filly Alleluia and Last Second, the winner of the Nassau Stakes and Sun Chariot Stakes. After her retirement from racing, Alouette became a successful broodmare: in addition to Alborada, she produced Albanova, a German-trained filly who won the Grosser Preis von Berlin Rheinland-Pokal, Preis von Europa in 2004.

The filly fractured a pedal bone as a foal and could not be sent to the sales. Rausing therefore decided to race Alborada in her own colours and sent her into training with Sir Mark Prescott at the Heath House stable in Newmarket. She was ridden in all but one of her races by the veteran British jockey George Duffield.

== Racing career ==
=== 1997: two-year-old season ===
Alborada made her racecourse debut on 19 July in a six furlong maiden race at Nottingham Racecourse. She started 2/1 favourite but after meeting interference in the closing stages she finished third of the seventeen runners behind Dazilyn Lady. Twelve days later at Goodwood Racecourse she contested a similar event and finished third to Midnight Line, a filly who went on to finish third in The Oaks and win the Long Island Handicap. On 17 September Alborada ran in a maiden race over 7 1/2 furlongs at Beverley Racecourse. She started the 2/5 favourite and led from the start to win by six lengths to record her first victory. In October, the filly was moved up in class when she was sent to Ireland to contest the Group Three Park Stakes at the Curragh. On this occasion she was ridden by Seb Sanders and started 3/1 favourite against nine opponents. Alborada took the lead inside the final quarter mile and went clear in the closing stages to win by two lengths from Winona, with the future Oaks winner Shahtoush in fourth.

=== 1998: three-year-old season ===
Alborada did not race in the spring of 1998, missing races such as the 1000 Guineas and the Epsom Oaks as the Heath House stable was affected by an outbreak of equine influenza. The filly also missed an intended engagement in the Coronation Stakes at Royal Ascot and did not reappear until 27 June when she was sent to the Curragh again for the Irish Pretty Polly Stakes (then a Group Two race). Racing over ten furlongs on soft ground, she started the 7/4 favourite and won "comfortably" by 2 1/2 lengths. On 1 August at Goodwood she raced in Britain for the first time in 10 1/2 months when she ran in the Group Two Nassau Stakes. Starting at odds of 4/1 she took the lead inside the final furlong and won by half a length from the 25/1 outsider Digitalize, with Midnight Line in third.

On 12 September, Alborada ran in her first Group One race when she was matched against colts and older horses in the Esat Digifone Champion Stakes at Leopardstown Racecourse. Her rivals included the dual King George VI and Queen Elizabeth Stakes winner Swain, the International Stakes winner One So Wonderful, the Oaks winner Shahtoush, the Irish 1,000 Guineas winner Tarascon and the 1997 European Champion two-year-old Xaar. Duffield settled the filly in third place before moving into second in the straight. She could make no further progress and finished second of the eight runners behind Swain. On her final appearance of the season, Alborada contested the Champion Stakes over ten furlongs at Newmarket on 17 October and started at odds of 6/1, with Daylami being made the odds-on favourite. After tracking the leaders for most of the way, Alborada took the lead approaching the final furlong and held the late challenge of Insatiable to win by a neck, with Daylami in third. The unplaced horses included One So Wonderful and the future Arlington Million winner Chester House. The win was enthusiastically received by the Newmarket crowd, reflecting the popularity of her jockey and trainer. Commenting on the stresses involved in training a top-class racehorse, Prescott commented: "You spend a lifetime watching races like this and wishing you could have a runner that good; and when you do it kills you."

=== 1999: four-year-old season ===
Alborada raced only twice as a four-year-old in 1999 as her season was disrupted by injury. On 31 July she started the 15/8 favourite for the Nassau Stakes, (run for the first time as a Group One race) but finished fifth behind the three-year-old Zahrat Dubai. Prescott could offer no explanation for the filly's poor performance.

On 16 October, Alborada attempted to become the second female racehorse (after Triptych) to win consecutive runnings of the Champion Stakes. The Japanese-bred filly Shiva, winner of the Tattersalls Gold Cup, started favourite ahead of Lear Spear who had defeated Fantastic Light in the Prince of Wales's Stakes at Royal Ascot, while Alborada shared third place in the betting with the 1998 Epsom Derby winner High-Rise. The fifty-two-year-old Duffield tracked the leaders before sending Alborada into the lead approaching the final furlong and she won the race by 1 1/4 lengths from Shiva, with Kabool in third. After the race Prescott admitted that he had considered retiring the filly in September after her injury problems and poor performances in training. Duffield said "she's an absolute superstar and this is a bonus for me at my age." Kirsten Rausing called Alborada "a filly for the history books; a great filly who will always be remembered in Newmarket."

== Stud record ==
Alborada was retired from racing to become a broodmare at the Lanwades Stud. She produced four winners from five foals:

- Alvarita (foaled in 2002, grey filly, sired by Selkirk), won two races including the Listed Prix Petite Etoile.
- Almamia (2005, bay filly by Hernando), failed to win in four races.
- Albaraka (2008, grey filly, by Selkirk), won one race, placed in the Listed Glasgow Stakes.
- Albion (2009, bay colt, by With Approval), won two races, second in the Prix Greffulhe.
- Algonquin (2012, grey colt, later gelded, by Archipenko), won four races in Ireland including the Listed Ruby Stakes. Later raced in Australia, where he was re-named My Nordic Hero and won the Festival Stakes (ATC).

She produced her last foal, Algonquin, in February 2012, but died shortly after delivering the foal.

== Pedigree ==
Pedigree of Alborada (GB), grey mare, 1995
Sire Alzao (USA) 1980	Lyphard (USA); 1969	Northern Dancer	Nearctic
Sire Alzao (USA) 1980	Lyphard (USA); 1969	Northern Dancer	Natalma
Sire Alzao (USA) 1980	Lyphard (USA); 1969	Goofed	Court Martial
Sire Alzao (USA) 1980	Lyphard (USA); 1969	Goofed	Barra
Sire Alzao (USA) 1980	Lady Rebecca (GB); 1971	Sir Ivor	Sir Gaylord
Sire Alzao (USA) 1980	Lady Rebecca (GB); 1971	Sir Ivor	Attica
Sire Alzao (USA) 1980	Lady Rebecca (GB); 1971	Pocahontas	Roman
Sire Alzao (USA) 1980	Lady Rebecca (GB); 1971	Pocahontas	How
Dam Alouette (GB) 1990	Darshaan (GB); 1981	Shirley Heights	Mill Reef
Dam Alouette (GB) 1990	Darshaan (GB); 1981	Shirley Heights	Hardiemma
Dam Alouette (GB) 1990	Darshaan (GB); 1981	Delsy	Abdos
Dam Alouette (GB) 1990	Darshaan (GB); 1981	Delsy	Kelty
Dam Alouette (GB) 1990	Alruccaba (IRE); 1983	Crystal Palace	Caro
Dam Alouette (GB) 1990	Alruccaba (IRE); 1983	Crystal Palace	Hermieres
Dam Alouette (GB) 1990	Alruccaba (IRE); 1983	Allara	Zeddaan
Dam Alouette (GB) 1990	Alruccaba (IRE); 1983	Allara	Nucciolina (Family: 9-c)
