= Arctic Tern (horse) =

American-bred Thoroughbred racehorse

- Sire: Sea-Bird
- Grandsire: Dan Cupid
- Dam: Bubbling Beauty
- Damsire: Hasty Road
- Sex: Stallion
- Foaled: 1973
- Country: United States
- Colour: Chestnut
- Breeder: Keswick Stables
- Owner: Mrs John S. Knight
- Trainer: John Fellows
- Record: 21:4-5-2

Major wins
- Prix Thomas Bryon (1975); Prix de Fontainebleau (1976); Prix Ganay (1977)

Awards
- Timeform rating 125 (1975), 126 (1976), 126 (1977); Leading sire in France (1986)

Arctic Tern (1973 – 13 July 1998) was an American-bred, French-trained Thoroughbred racehorse and sire. He was campaigned at the highest level in Europe for three seasons, winning four of his twenty-one races including the Prix Thomas Bryon in 1975, the Prix de Fontainebleau in 1976 and the Prix Ganay (1977). He was also placed in several major races including the Prix Lupin and the Eclipse Stakes. After his retirement from racing, Arctic Tern became a successful breeding stallion with the best of his progeny being Bering.

== Background ==
Arctic Tern was a chestnut horse with a white blaze and four white socks, bred in Virginia by his owner Mrs John S. Knight's Keswick Stables. He was from the last American crop of foals sired by Sea-Bird one of the highest-rated horses of the twentieth century who won The Derby and Prix de l'Arc de Triomphe in 1965. His other progeny included the Arc winner Allez France and the Champion Hurdler Sea Pigeon. Sea-Bird returned to France in 1973 but died later that year. Arctic Tern's dam, Bubbling Beauty, was of no use as a racehorse, finishing unplaced in both her races and had little impact as a broodmare before or after she produced Arctic Tern. She did, however, come from an excellent family, being a half-sister to the dams of Northern Dancer and Halo. The colt was blind in his right eye, but his disability seldom caused him any problems. He was sent to race in Europe where he was trained by John Fellows and ridden in most of his races by Maurice Philipperon.

== Racing career ==
=== 1975: two-year-old season ===
Arctic Tern began his racing career at Deauville Racecourse in August when he was beaten a head by No Turning in a race for previously unraced horses over 1200 metres. In a maiden race over 1400 metres at Chantilly Racecourse the colt took the lead and looked likely to win but swerved badly across the course (possibly due to his visual impairment) in the last 200 metres and was beaten half a length by Actopan. He won on his third attempt when winning a maiden race over 1300 metres at Maisons-Laffitte Racecourse by four lengths. On his final appearance of the year Arctic Tern was moved up in class and distance to contest the Prix Thomas Bryon over 1550 metres at Saint-Cloud Racecourse. Ridden by Maurice Philipperon, he started at odds of 6.1/1 in a field which included Comeram (runner-up in the Grand Critérium), the Aga Khan's colt Kaysaan and the future Epsom Derby winner Empery. Restrained in the early stages by Philipperon, he moved up in the straight to take the lead 200 metres from the finish and won by two lengths from Comeram, with Empery one and a half lengths back in third.

=== 1976: three-year-old season ===
On his first appearance as a three-year-old, Arctic Tern contested the Prix de Fontainebleau over 1600 metres at Longchamp on 4 April and won by three quarters of a length from Roan Star. He failed to win in eight subsequent races, but produced several good performances in defeat. He finished fifth when favourite for the Poule d'Essai des Poulains and then ran second to Youth in the Prix Lupin, beaten three quarters of a length, with Empery Roan Star and Manado among the unplaced runners. On 6 June Arctic Tern was moved up in distance for the Prix du Jockey Club over 2400 metres at Chantilly Racecourse and finished ninth of the eighteen runners behind Youth. The colt started favourite for the Prix Eugène Adam on 18 July but finished fifth behind Crow. In autumn he finished second to Youth in the Prix Niel, twelfth behind Ivanjica in the Prix de l'Arc de Triomphe and fifth to On My Way in the Prix du Conseil de Paris. On his final appearance of the season, Arctic Tern started 9/4 favourite for the Prix Perth on 13 November but finished fifth behind the British-trained colt Dominion.

=== 1977: four-year-old season ===
On his debut as a four-year-old Arctic Tern finished third behind Kasteel and Full of Hope in the Prix d'Harcourt over 2000 metres at Longchamp on 11 April. At the same course three weeks later the colt started 5/1 second favourite for the Group One Prix Ganay over 2100 metres. His rivals included the Crow, who started favourite, Vitiges, Exceller, Full of Hope, Trepan and Sarah Siddons as well as Infra Green (winner of the race in the previous year) and the Prix Vermeille winner Lagunette. Arctic Tern accelerated halfway up the straight showing what Timeform described as "fine finishing speed" to win by half length from Exceller, with Infra Green a neck away in third. The colt started favourite for the Prix Dollar on 29 May but was beaten three quarters of a length by Trepan. In July Arctic Tern was sent overseas for the first time to contest the Eclipse Stakes over ten furlongs at Sandown Park Racecourse. He was unco-operative before the start, becoming highly unsettled in the paddock and having to be mounted after being led onto the racecourse. He started poorly and raced at the rear of the field before making progress in the straight but never looked likely to win, finishing a distant third behind Artaius and Lucky Wednesday.

After a two and a half month break, Arctic Tern returned in the Prix Foy over 2400 metres at Longchamp in September. He started favourite but finished fourth of the six runners behind Malacate. In October, the colt again attempted to win the Arc de Triomphe, this time equipped with blinkers for the first time, but finished twenty-fifth of the twenty-six runners behind Alleged. He returned to England later that month for the Champion Stakes over ten furlongs at Newmarket Racecourse. In contrast to his previous visit to the United Kingdom he was perfectly behaved and looked the likely winners when he took a clear advantage inside the last quarter mile. He weakened in the closing stages, however, and eventually finished fourth behind Flying Water, Relkino and North Stoke. On his final appearance, Arctic Tern was sent to the United States to contest the inaugural Turf Classic at Aqueduct Racetrack in November but made no impact, finishing unplaced behind Johnny D.

== Assessment ==
There was no International Classification of European two-year-olds in 1975: the official handicappers of Britain, Ireland and France compiled separate rankings for horses which competed in those countries. In the official French handicap, Arctic Tern was rated the sixth best colt of the year behind Manado, Vitiges, Comeram, Roan Star and Kano. The independent Timeform organisation gave the colt a rating of 125, five pounds behind their top-rated juvenile Manado. Timeform gave him a rating of 126 in 1976, nine pounds behind their Horse of the Year Youth. He was also rated nine pounds inferior to Youth in the official French Handicap. Timeform again awarded Arctic Tern a rating of 126 in 1977, placing him eleven pounds behind the top-rated Alleged. In the inaugural International Classification, he was given a rating of 90, making him the eighth-best older male horse in Europe, four pounds behind the joint-topweights Balmerino and Orange Bay.

== Stud record ==
Arctic Tern was retired from racing to become a breeding stallion at Alec Head's Haras du Quesnay in Normandy. In his first two seasons at stud he sired the fillies Harbour and Escaline, who won the Prix de Diane in 1982 and 1983 respectively. In 1983 he was exported the United States where he stood at the Lane's End Farm in Kentucky. In his penultimate season in France he sired Bering, the winner of the Prix du Jockey Club and later the sire of Pennekamp. The success of Bering helped make Arctic Tern the Leading sire in France in 1986. Arctic Tern's other progeny included The Derby runner-up Glacial Storm. He returned to France in 1993, where he stood at the Haras du Petit Tellier in Sévigny. He died in 1998.

== Pedigree ==
Pedigree of Arctic Tern (USA), chestnut stallion, 1973
Sire Sea-Bird (FR) 1962	Dan Cupid (USA); 1956	Native Dancer	Polynesian
Sire Sea-Bird (FR) 1962	Dan Cupid (USA); 1956	Native Dancer	Geisha
Sire Sea-Bird (FR) 1962	Dan Cupid (USA); 1956	Vixenette	Sickle
Sire Sea-Bird (FR) 1962	Dan Cupid (USA); 1956	Vixenette	Lady Reynard
Sire Sea-Bird (FR) 1962	Sicalade (FR); 1956	Sicambre	Prince Bio
Sire Sea-Bird (FR) 1962	Sicalade (FR); 1956	Sicambre	Sif
Sire Sea-Bird (FR) 1962	Sicalade (FR); 1956	Mamelade	Maurepas
Sire Sea-Bird (FR) 1962	Sicalade (FR); 1956	Mamelade	Couleur
Dam Bubbling Beauty (USA) 1961	Hasty Road (USA); 1951	Roman	Sir Gallahad
Dam Bubbling Beauty (USA) 1961	Hasty Road (USA); 1951	Roman	Buckup
Dam Bubbling Beauty (USA) 1961	Hasty Road (USA); 1951	Traffic Court	Discovery
Dam Bubbling Beauty (USA) 1961	Hasty Road (USA); 1951	Traffic Court	Traffic
Dam Bubbling Beauty (USA) 1961	Almahmoud (USA); 1947	Mahmoud	Blenheim
Dam Bubbling Beauty (USA) 1961	Almahmoud (USA); 1947	Mahmoud	Mah Mahal
Dam Bubbling Beauty (USA) 1961	Almahmoud (USA); 1947	Arbitrator	Peace Chance
Dam Bubbling Beauty (USA) 1961	Almahmoud (USA); 1947	Arbitrator	Mother Goose (Family 2-d)
