= Pennekamp =

American-bred Thoroughbred racehorse

- Racing colours of Sheikh Mohammed
- Sire: Bering
- Grandsire: Arctic Tern
- Dam: Coral Dance
- Damsire: Green Dancer
- Sex: Stallion
- Foaled: 26 March 1992
- Country: United Kingdom
- Colour: Bay
- Breeder: Magalen O Bryant
- Owner: Sheikh Mohammed
- Trainer: André Fabre
- Record: 7:6-0-0
- Earnings: £299,913

Major wins
- Prix de la Salamandre (1994); Dewhurst Stakes (1994); 2000 Guineas (1995)

Pennekamp (foaled 26 March 1992) was an American-bred, French-trained Thoroughbred racehorse and sire. He was the highest-rated French two-year-old of 1994, when his wins included the Prix de la Salamandre and the Dewhurst Stakes. In May 1995 he recorded his most important success when he defeated the British champion Celtic Swing in the 2000 Guineas. Pennekamp sustained a leg injury that ended his career when beaten as favourite for The Derby.

== Background ==
Pennekamp was a bay horse with a white blaze and four white feet bred in Kentucky by Magalen O. Bryant. He was the best horse sired by Bering, who won the Prix du Jockey Club and finished second to Dancing Brave in the 1986 Prix de l'Arc de Triomphe. Pennekamp's dam Coral Dance was a successful racemare who finished second in the Prix Marcel Boussac. He was acquired from his breeder by Sheikh Mohammed and sent to France to be trained by André Fabre. He was ridden in all his races by Thierry Jarnet. Pennnekamp was named after the John Pennekamp Coral Reef State Park off the Florida coast.

== Racing career ==
=== 1994: two-year-old season ===
Pennekamp made his first appearance in a three-runner race at Évry in June over 1200m. He won by four lengths from Tycoon King and Bryntirion. He next appeared in August when he was moved up to Listed class for the Prix du Haras de la Huderie at Deauville and won by three quarters of a length from Done Well. A month later he ran in the Group One Prix de la Salamandre over 1400m at Longchamp and was made odds-on favourite. He turned into the straight in third place before being switched to the outside where he showed good acceleration to take the lead 200m from the finish and win by three quarters of a length from the British-trained colt Montjoy.

On his final start of the season, Pennekamp was sent to England to contest the Group One Dewhurst Stakes at Newmarket on 14 October. He started the 5/2 joint-favourite for the seven furlong race alongside the Royal Lodge Stakes winner Eltish. Jarnet restrained the colt in the early stages before moving him up to make his challenge in the final furlong. He took the lead from Green Perfume in the closing stages and recorded an impressive one length win. Pennekamp's status as the leading European two-year-old lasted only eight days: on 22 October Celtic Swing won the Racing Post Trophy by twelve lengths and was immediately made a short-priced favourite for the following year's 2000 Guineas and Derby. In the official International Classification, Pennekamp was given a rating of 124, six pound below Celtic Swing.

=== 1995: three-year-old season ===
As a three-year-old Pennekamp was trained for the British Classic Races and prepared for a meeting with Celtic Swing in the 2000 Guineas at Newmarket by winning the Listed Prix Djebel at Évry on 15 April. A week later Celtic Swing maintained his unbeaten record in the Greenham Stakes. At Newmarket on 6 May, Pennekamp started at odds of 9/2 for the Guineas, with Celtic Swing being made the 4/5 favourite. As in the Dewhurst Stakes, Jarnet held Pennekamp towards the back of the field before making his challenge in the last quarter mile. Celtic Swing had already taken the lead but Pennekamp moved up alongside the favourite and then took the lead a furlong form the finish with what The Independent described as a "scintillating burst of speed". Celtic Swing rallied in the closing stages, but Pennekamp maintained his narrow advantage to win by a head. After the race Fabre paid tribute to the winner by saying "I honestly think that Pennekamp is a great horse", while Jarnet called his performance "marvelous".

Pennekamp's pedigree and style of racing encouraged many observers to believe that he would be even more effective over longer distances, and he was strongly supported for the Derby. His position as favourite was strengthened when Celtic Swing was withdrawn from the race to run instead in the Prix du Jockey Club. At Epsom on 10 June, Pennekamp, by now undefeated in six races, started 11/8 favourite for the Derby in a field of fifteen runners. He made no impression in the race, always being towards the rear of the field and finishing eleventh behind Lammtarra, beaten more than twenty lengths. He was subsequently found to be lame and never ran again.

== Stud career ==
Pennekamp stood as a stallion for his owner's Darley breeding organisation at the Kildangan Stud near Monasterevin, County Kildare. In March 2000 he fell ill with colic but recovered after emergency surgery. In 2002 he was transferred to the Haras du Logis in France. In 2004 he was leased to Sextorps Stud in Sweden and then sold by Darley and moved to the Bracklynn Stud near Mullingar in Ireland in 2005. He has failed to produce any Group One winners on the flat, where the best of his winners has been the Park Hill Stakes winner Alexander Three D. He has had more success as a sire of National Hunt runners, with his offspring including the Triumph Hurdle winner Penzance.

== Pedigree ==
Pedigree of Pennekamp (USA), bay stallion, 1992
Sire Bering (GB) 1983	Arctic Tern; 1973	Sea-Bird	Dan Cupid
Sire Bering (GB) 1983	Arctic Tern; 1973	Sea-Bird	Sicalade
Sire Bering (GB) 1983	Arctic Tern; 1973	Bubbling Beauty	Hasty Road
Sire Bering (GB) 1983	Arctic Tern; 1973	Bubbling Beauty	Almahmoud
Sire Bering (GB) 1983	Beaune; 1974	Lyphard	Northern Dancer*
Sire Bering (GB) 1983	Beaune; 1974	Lyphard	Goofed
Sire Bering (GB) 1983	Beaune; 1974	Barbra	Le Fabuleux
Sire Bering (GB) 1983	Beaune; 1974	Barbra	Biobelle
Dam Coral Dance (FR) 1978	Green Dancer; 1972	Nijinsky	Northern Dancer*
Dam Coral Dance (FR) 1978	Green Dancer; 1972	Nijinsky	Flaming Page
Dam Coral Dance (FR) 1978	Green Dancer; 1972	Green Valley	Val de Loir
Dam Coral Dance (FR) 1978	Green Dancer; 1972	Green Valley	Sly Pola
Dam Coral Dance (FR) 1978	Carvinia; 1970	Diatome	Sicambre
Dam Coral Dance (FR) 1978	Carvinia; 1970	Diatome	Dictaway
Dam Coral Dance (FR) 1978	Carvinia; 1970	Coraline	Fine Top
Dam Coral Dance (FR) 1978	Carvinia; 1970	Coraline	Copelina (Family:20-d)

- Pennekamp was inbred 4x4 to Northern Dancer, meaning that this stallion appears twice in the fourth generation of his pedigree.
