= Prix de la Salamandre =

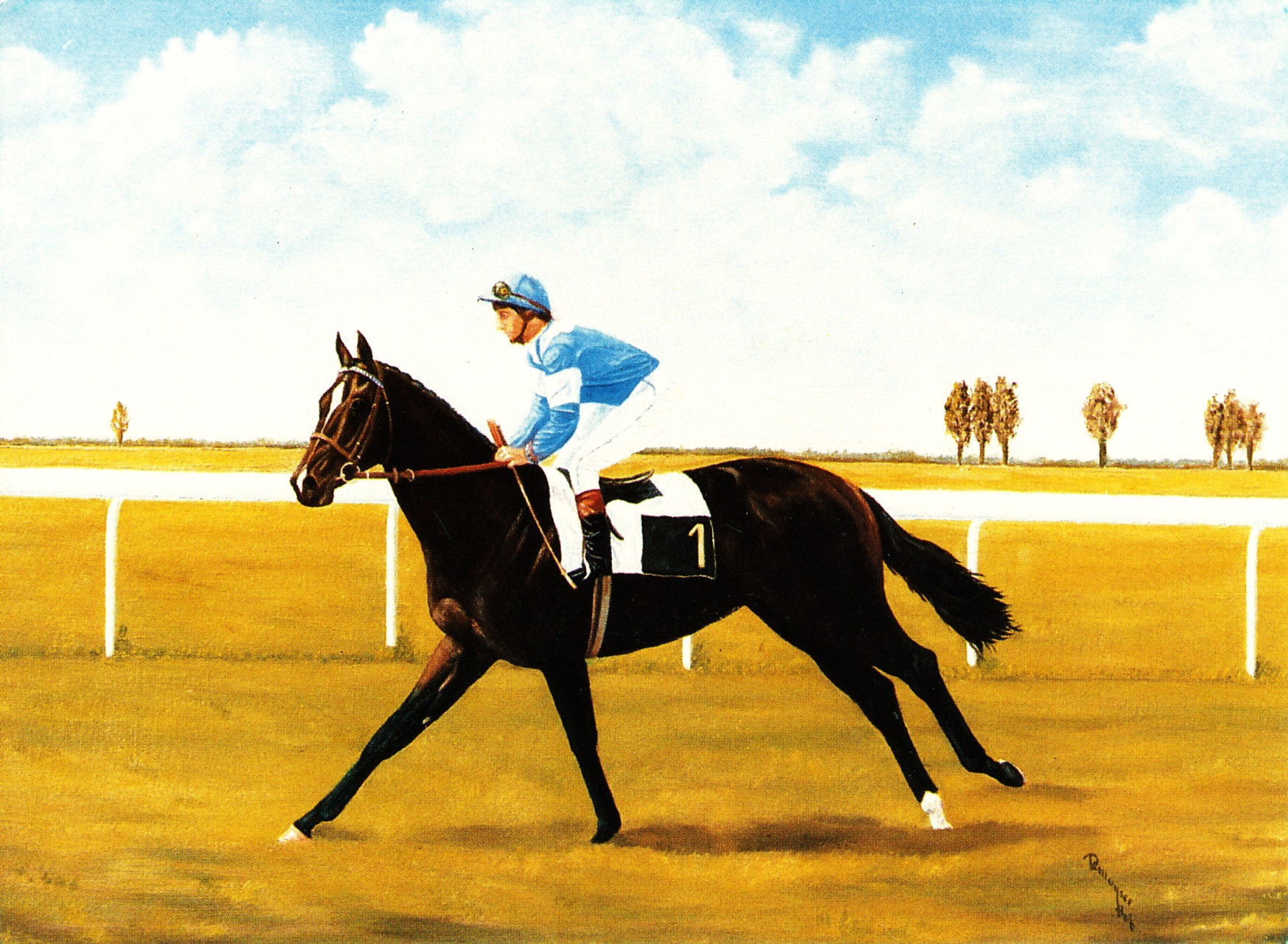
- Noblequest, oil on canvas Painting by Bob Demuyser (1920-2003)
- Class: Group 1
- Location: Longchamp Racecourse; Paris, France
- Inaugurated: 1872
- Final run: 16 September 2000
- Race type: Flat / Thoroughbred
- Website: france-galop.com

Race information
- Distance: 1,400 metres (7f)
- Surface: Turf
- Track: Right-handed
- Qualification: Two-year-olds excluding geldings
- Weight: 57 kg Allowances; 1½ kg for fillies
- Purse: 680,000 F (2000); 1st: 400,000 F

The Prix de la Salamandre was a Group 1 flat horse race in France open to two-year-old thoroughbred colts and fillies. It was run at Longchamp over a distance of 1,400 metres (about 7 furlongs), and it was scheduled to take place each year in September.

== History ==
The event was established in 1872, and it was originally held at Chantilly. For a period it was staged in October.

The race was transferred to Longchamp in 1907. That year's running was contested over 1,600 metres, and had prize money of 10,000 francs. It was cut to 1,400 metres and increased to 15,000 francs in 1908.

The present system of race grading was introduced in 1971, and the Prix de la Salamandre was classed at Group 1 level.

The race was last run in 2000. It was discontinued after France Galop restructured its Group 1 programme for two-year-olds in 2001.

== Records ==
Leading jockey since 1970 (8 wins):

- Freddy Head – Delmora (1974), Princesse Lida (1979), Maximova (1982, dead-heat), Baiser Vole (1985), Miesque (1986), Common Grounds (1987), Machiavellian (1989), Hector Protector (1990)

Leading trainer since 1970 (12 wins):

- François Boutin – Zapoteco (1972), Nonoalco (1973), Delmora (1974), Manado (1975), Miswaki (1980), Seattle Song (1983), Miesque (1986), Common Grounds (1987), Machiavellian (1989), Hector Protector (1990), Arazi (1991), Coup de Genie (1993)

Leading owner since 1970 (6 wins):

- Stavros Niarchos – Seattle Song (1983), Miesque (1986), Common Grounds (1987), Machiavellian (1989), Hector Protector (1990), Coup de Genie (1993)

== Winners since 1970 ==
Year	Winner	Jockey	Trainer	Owner	Time
1970	My Swallow	Lester Piggott	Paul Davey	David Robinson	1:22.20
1971	Our Mirage	Lester Piggott	Barry Hills	Mrs S. Enfield	1:26.00
1972	Zapoteco	Sandy Barclay	François Boutin	María Félix Berger	1:24.80
1973	Nonoalco	Lester Piggott	François Boutin	María Félix Berger	1:26.80
1974	Delmora	Freddy Head	François Boutin	Gerry Oldham	1:20.70
1975	Manado	Philippe Paquet	François Boutin	Souren Vanian
1976	Blushing Groom	Henri Samani	François Mathet	HH Aga Khan IV	1:24.80
1977	John de Coombe	Geoff Baxter	Paul Cole	A. H. Warren	1:22.50
1978	Irish River	Maurice Philipperon	John Cunnington, Jr.	Mrs Raymond Adès	1:22.30
1979	Princesse Lida	Freddy Head	Alec Head	Jacques Wertheimer	1:21.80
1980	Miswaki	Philippe Paquet	François Boutin	Etti Plesch	1:22.70
1981	Green Forest	Alfred Gibert	Mitri Saliba	Mahmoud Fustok	1:24.30
1982 (dh)	Deep Roots; Maximova	Willie Carson; Freddy Head	Pascal Bary; Criquette Head	Corine Barande-Barbe; Haras d'Etreham	1:23.20
1983	Seattle Song	Cash Asmussen	François Boutin	Stavros Niarchos	1:24.30
1984	Noblequest	Yves Saint-Martin	Robert Collet	Bendar bin M. Al Kabir	1:29.20
1985	Baiser Vole	Freddy Head	Criquette Head	Robert Sangster	1:22.10
1986	Miesque	Freddy Head	François Boutin	Stavros Niarchos	1:25.50
1987	Common Grounds	Freddy Head	François Boutin	Stavros Niarchos	1:21.80
1988	Oczy Czarnie	Gary W. Moore	Jean-Marie Béguigné	Edouard de Rothschild	1:25.00
1989	Machiavellian	Freddy Head	François Boutin	Stavros Niarchos	1:24.80
1990	Hector Protector	Freddy Head	François Boutin	Stavros Niarchos	1:20.80
1991	Arazi	Gérald Mossé	François Boutin	Allen Paulson	1:20.90
1992	Zafonic	Pat Eddery	André Fabre	Khalid Abdullah	1:23.30
1993	Coup de Genie	Cash Asmussen	François Boutin	Stavros Niarchos	1:23.10
1994	Pennekamp	Thierry Jarnet	André Fabre	Sheikh Mohammed	1:22.90
1995	Lord of Men	Frankie Dettori	John Gosden	Sheikh Mohammed	1:27.00
1996	Revoque	John Reid	Peter Chapple-Hyam	Robert Sangster	1:20.90
1997	Xaar	Olivier Peslier	André Fabre	Khalid Abdullah	1:21.60
1998	Aljabr	Frankie Dettori	Saeed bin Suroor	Godolphin	1:24.00
1999	Giant's Causeway	Michael Kinane	Aidan O'Brien	Magnier / Tabor	1:22.90
2000	Tobougg	Craig Williams	Mick Channon	Ahmed Al Maktoum	1:22.20

== Earlier winners ==
- 1872: Montargis
- 1873: Perla
- 1874: Fille du Ciel
- 1875: Fusion
- 1876: Faisane
- 1877: Mantille
- 1878: Swift
- 1879: La Flandrie
- 1880: Navette
- 1881: Peronne
- 1882: Chitre
- 1883: Fra Diavolo
- 1884: Barberine
- 1885: Alger
- 1886: La Jarretiere
- 1887: Galaor
- 1888: Reine des Pres / Tantale *
- 1889: Alicante
- 1890: Double Six
- 1891: Incitatus
- 1892: Fousi Yama
- 1893: Gospodar
- 1894: Launay
- 1895: Le Basilic
- 1896: Valparaiso
- 1897: Volnay
- 1898: Sesara
- 1899: Cap Martin
- 1900: Clos Vougeot
- 1901: Champagne
- 1902: Laissez Passer
- 1903: Fifre
- 1904: Ladislas
- 1905: Cassandre
- 1906: Pernod
- 1907: Kinkajou
- 1908: Oversight
- 1909: Assouan
- 1910: Nectarine
- 1911: Shannon
- 1912: Sunflower
- 1913: Le Grand Pressigny
- 1919: Pito
- 1920: Ksar
- 1921: Kefalin
- 1922: Guemul
- 1923: Optimist
- 1924: Ravageur
- 1925: Dorina
- 1926: Gerbert / Iberia *
- 1927: Marot
- 1928: Amorina
- 1929: Blue Skies
- 1930: Titus
- 1931: Son Excellence
- 1932: Pantalon
- 1933: Sanaa
- 1934: Finlandaise
- 1935: Remember
- 1936: Mousson
- 1937: Asheratt
- 1938: Blue Moon
- 1941: Blue Tzar
- 1942: Buena Vista
- 1943: Daova
- 1945: Prince Chevalier
- 1946: Catalina
- 1950: Catumbo
- 1953: Falstaff
- 1955: Tenareze
- 1956: Little Pan
- 1957: Anne d'Anjou
- 1958: Lovely Rose / Princillon *
- 1959: Never Too Late
- 1960: Right Royal
- 1961: Prudent
- 1962: Hula Dancer
- 1963: Kirkland Lake
- 1964: Grey Dawn
- 1965: Canadel
- 1966: Blue Tom
- 1967: Batitu
- 1968: Kebah
- 1969: Breton

* The 1888, 1926 and 1958 races were dead-heats and have joint winners.

== See also ==
- List of French flat horse races
