= François Boutin =

French Thoroughbred horse trainer (1937–1995)

Personal information
- Born: 27 January 1937 Beaunay, Marne, France
- Died: 1 February 1995 (aged 58)
- Occupation: Trainer

Horse racing career
- Sport: Horse racing

Major racing wins
- Critérium de Saint-Cloud (1969, 1971, 1973, 1976, 1979, 1989); Prix Lupin (1970, 1982, 1983, 1991, 1992, 1993); Prix Morny (1973, 1977, 1988, 1989, 1990, 1991, 1993); Prix Jacques Le Marois (1974, 1987, 1988, 1990, 1991, 1992, 1994); Prix de la Salamandre (1974, 1975, 1980, 1983, 1986, 1987, 1989, 1990, 1991, 1993); Grand Prix de Paris (1974); Prix d'Ispahan (1975, 1976, 1988); Prix Jean Prat (1975, 1981, 1984, 1985, 1990); Grand Critérium (1975, 1977, 1990, 1991); Prix du Moulin de Longchamp (1975, 1984, 1987, 1991, 1993); Prix Vermeille (1976, 1981, 1984); Prix Marcel Boussac (1977, 1981, 1986); Prix d'Astarté (1978, 1992); Prix Maurice de Gheest (1979, 1980); Prix Ganay (1980, 1984, 1986) French Classic Races: Poule d'Essai des Pouliches (1982, 1987, 1993, 1994); Poule d'Essai des Poulains (1983, 1988, 1990, 1991, 1992, 1993); Prix du Jockey Club (1974, 1993); Prix de Diane (1984, 1986, 1988, 1994); British Classic Races: Epsom Oaks (1968); 2000 Guineas (1974, 1982); Prix Royal-Oak (1977); 1000 Guineas (1987); Other major wins: England/Ireland; Ascot Gold Cup (1975, 1976, 1977); Irish Derby (1976); St. James's Palace Stakes (1993); Matron Stakes (1994) United States: Joe Hirsch Turf Classic Invitational(1981, 1982); Washington, D.C. International Stakes (1982, 1984); Hollywood Derby (1984); Breeders' Cup Turf Mile (1987, 1988); Breeders' Cup Juvenile (1991)

Racing awards
- Leading trainer in France by earnings (1976, 1978, 1979, 1980, 1981, 1983, 1984); Daily Telegraph Award of Merit (1993)

Honours
- Prix François Boutin at Deauville Racecourse

Significant horses
- Nonoalco, Sagaro, Nureyev, April Run, Miesque, Blushing John, Hector Protector, Arazi, Kingmambo, East of the Moon
- Updated on 3 May 2026

François Boutin (21 January 1937 – 1 February 1995) was a French Thoroughbred horse trainer.

The son of a farmer, he was born in the village of Beaunay in the northerly Seine Maritime département. He began riding horses at a young age and competed in show jumping and cross-country equestrianism. He began his professional racing career driving horses in harness racing then after serving as a flat racing apprentice, obtained his license as a trainer in 1964.

François Boutin was the trainer for the stables of Jean-Luc Lagardère and for the Stavros Niarchos family. During his more than thirty-year career he was the leading money winner in France seven times (1976, 1978–81, 1983–84). Although victory eluded him in France's most prestigious horse race, the Prix de l'Arc de Triomphe, Boutin won the Poule d'Essai des Poulains on six occasions and most every other important race in the country multiple times.

Racing outside France Boutin's horse Sagaro was the first to win England's Ascot Gold Cup three years in a row. As well, Boutin-trained horses won the 1982 English 2,000 Guineas, the 1987 1,000 Guineas and the Matron Stakes in Ireland (Nureyev, ridden by stable jockey Philippe Paquet, finished first in the 1980 Two Thousand Guineas, but was later disqualified). François Boutin trained April Run for Diana M. Firestone who won in France plus had back-to-back wins in the 1981-82 Grade I Joe Hirsch Turf Classic Invitational at Belmont Park.

Boutin is best remembered in the United States as the trainer of the Hall of Fame filly Miesque who had back-to-back wins in the Breeders' Cup Mile in 1987 and 1988 and for Arazi, whose breathtaking victory in the 1991 Breeders' Cup Juvenile was followed by his shocking upset in the 1992 Kentucky Derby.

From his first marriage he had one son, Eric, and two daughters, Patricia and Nathalie. A widower, he remarried in 1989 to Princess Lucy Young Ruspoli, the daughter of William T. Young of Lexington, Kentucky. Patricia is currently in the racing business.

In 1995, François Boutin died from liver cancer in Paris. The Prix François Boutin at Hippodrome Deauville-La Touques race course in Deauville is named in his honor. His grand children give back the trophy.
