= Sea Bird =

French-bred Thoroughbred racehorse

Sea-Bird
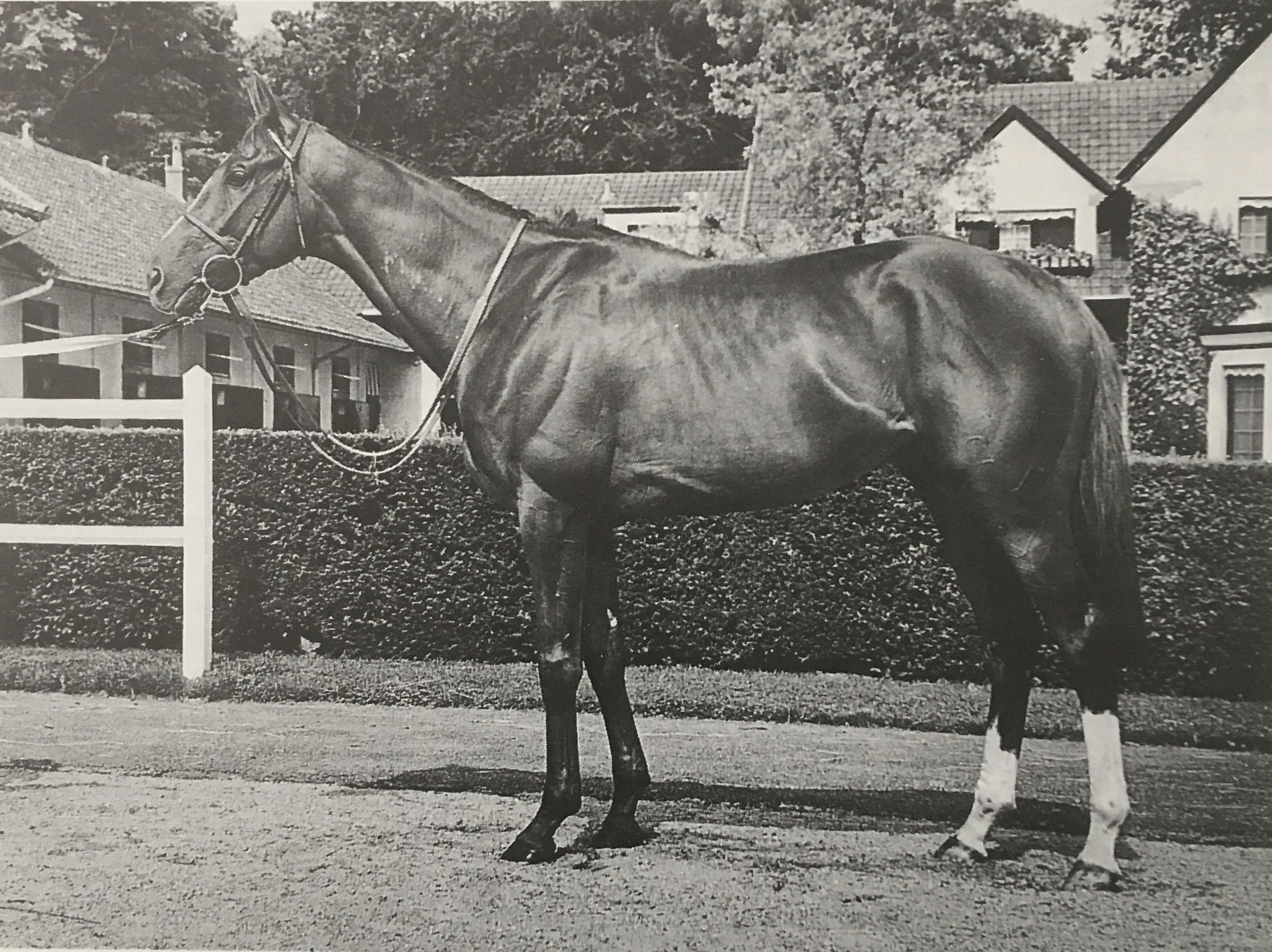
- Sire: Dan Cupid
- Grandsire: Native Dancer
- Dam: Sicalade
- Damsire: Sicambre
- Sex: Stallion
- Foaled: 1962
- Country: France
- Colour: Chestnut
- Breeder: Jean Ternynck
- Owner: Jean Ternynck
- Trainer: Etienne Pollet
- Record: 8: 7-1-0
- Earnings: $646,906

Major wins
- Critérium de Maisons-Laffitte (1964); Prix Greffulhe (1965); Prix Lupin (1965); Grand Prix de Saint-Cloud (1965); Epsom Derby (1965); Prix de l'Arc de Triomphe (1965)

Honours
- British Horse of the Year (1965); French Horse Racing Hall of Fame; Timeform rating: 145

Sea-Bird (1962–1973) was a French Thoroughbred racehorse and sire. In a career which lasted from September 1964 until October 1965, he ran eight times and won seven races. Sea-Bird is most famous for his victories in two of Europe's most prestigious races, the Epsom Derby and the Prix de l'Arc de Triomphe. His Timeform rating of 145 remains the second highest flat figure behind Frankel's rating of 147 awarded by that publication.

== Background ==
Sea-Bird was a chestnut horse with a narrow white blaze and white socks on his hind legs bred at the stables of his owner, the Lille textile manufacturer Jean Ternynck. Described by Timeform as "a tall, well-made horse", Sea-Bird was sired by the French Derby runner-up Dan Cupid, and trained, like his sire, in France by Etienne Pollet at Chantilly. None of his five immediate dams ever won a flat race, although his great-grandam Couleur did produce Camaree, who won the 1000 Guineas in 1950, and Sea Bird was more distantly related to the Belmont Stakes winner High Echelon. On the racetrack, Sea-Bird's dam, Sicalade, dead-heated once for second place as a two-year-old in what was her only season to race. His second dam, Marmelade, was unplaced on her only start and third dam, Couleur, was unplaced on the flat but won once over hurdles. The next dam, Colour Bar, could manage no more than third in a selling race before winning under Pony Turf Club rules and fifth dam, Lady Disdain, was unsuccessful in both her starts. So for five generations the female line proved all but worthless in terms of racing ability. The sixth generation produced one of the finest racehorses the world has ever seen. Sea-Bird was the only one of Sicalade's three foals to see a racecourse. She had serious circulatory problems, and after another difficult foaling in 1963 when Sea-Bird was a yearling, Ternynck decided to cut his losses and sold her to a local butcher in Les Andelys for £100 when she was just seven years of age.

=== Name ===
In France, the horse was known as Sea-Bird, a spelling followed by many modern writers. When racing abroad and standing at stud he was usually referred to as "Sea Bird II". He was referred to as "Sea-Bird II" by Timeform.

== Racing career ==
=== 1964: two-year-old season ===
Sea-Bird started in three races as a two-year-old, winning his first two, the Prix de Blaison at Chantilly by a short neck (started slowly) and the Critérium de Maisons-Laffitte by a neck from Blabla (who won the Prix de Diane the following year). He met with the only defeat of his career in the Grand Critérium when second to his stablemate Grey Dawn, who was the favourite after winning the Prix Morny and the Prix de la Salamandre. Sea-Bird started slowly, as he had done in his two wins, but made up a great deal of ground in the straight to finish second, two lengths behind Grey Dawn. Maurice Larraun, Sea-Bird's jockey, appeared to have given the horse too much to do and never rode Sea-Bird again. At the end of the season, Sea-Bird was rated three pounds inferior to Grey Dawn by the official French handicapper.

=== 1965: three-year-old season ===
As a three-year-old, Sea-Bird won all five starts, starting with a three-length win in the Prix Greffulhe. He next appeared in the Prix Lupin, which he won by six lengths from Diatome.

In The Derby, Sea-Bird started as the 7/4 favourite in a field of twenty two. There was an incident the night before the race in which police and security staff repelled a gang which had attempted to enter the stable of the 2000 Guineas winner Niksar. Before the race, Sea-Bird was described as looking "plain and high". He raced on the outside behind the leaders until the turn into the straight and then moved up to take the lead on the bridle with Glennon sitting "still as a statue". Sea-Bird won effortlessly by two lengths from Meadow Court, who went on to win the Irish Derby and the King George VI and Queen Elizabeth Stakes, with I Say in third. Timeform said of his victory: "Sea-Bird's performance at Epsom had to be seen to believed. He beat his twenty-one opponents without coming off the bit."

In July, Sea-Bird ran in the Grand Prix de Saint-Cloud, which he won, easing down, by two and a half lengths from Couroucou. He was then rested until the autumn.

In the Prix de l'Arc de Triomphe, Sea-Bird faced a very strong field, including Irish Derby winner Meadow Court, Preakness winner Tom Rolfe, French Derby (Prix du Jockey Club) winner Reliance, Prix de Diane winner Blabla and Russian Derby winner Anilin. Starting at odds of 6/5, Sea Bird was an easy 6-length winner from Reliance despite veering sharply across the track in the straight, with jockey Pat Glennon patting him down the neck in the final 100 yards (though photographs of the finish show it to have been closer to four and a half lengths). Five lengths further back in third place was Diatome, who went on to win the Washington, D.C. International. Fourth place went to Free Ride, fifth was Anilin and sixth was Tom Rolfe.

== Assessment and honours ==
Sea-Bird was given a rating of 145 by Timeform for the year 1965, the highest awarded to any horse in the 20th century. This remained the highest until Frankel's performance in the 2012 Queen Anne Stakes at Royal Ascot was rated 147.

Despite having run only once in the United Kingdom, Sea-Bird was voted British Horse of the Year by the Racegoers' club in 1965, taking 228 of the 240 votes.

In their book A Century of Champions, John Randall and Tony Morris rated Sea-Bird the greatest racehorse of the 20th century, one pound ahead of Secretariat and two pounds ahead of Ribot and Brigadier Gerard.

A summary of Sea-Bird's racing career is listed below:

Date	Racecourse	Distance	Race	Jockey	Weight	Going	Odds	Field	Result	Margin
02 Sep 64	Chantilly	7 furlongs	Prix de Blaison	T P Glennon	8-10	Good	7/4f	8	1st	Neck
18 Sep 64	Maisons-Laffitte	7 furlongs	Critérium de Maisons-Laffitte G3	T P Glennon	8-7	Good	6/4f	7	1st	Neck
11 Oct 64	Longchamp	1 mile	Grand Critérium G1	M Larraun	8-11	Heavy	3/1	11	2nd	2 lengths
04 Apr 65	Longchamp	1 mile 2½f	Prix Greffulhe G2	T P Glennon	9-2	Good	7/10f	9	1st	3 lengths
16 May 65	Longchamp	1 mile 2½f	Prix Lupin G1	T P Glennon	9-2	Good	4/5f	7	1st	6 lengths
02 Jun 65	Epsom	1½ miles	Epsom Derby G1	T P Glennon	9-0	Good	7/4f	22	1st	2 lengths
04 Jul 65	Saint-Cloud	1 mile 4½f	Grand Prix de Saint-Cloud G1	T P Glennon	8-7	Good	1/5f	9	1st	2½ lengths
03 Oct 65	Longchamp	1½ miles	Prix de l'Arc de Triomphe G1	T P Glennon	8-10	Soft	6/5f	20	1st	6 lengths

== Stud career ==
Prior to the running of his final race, the American breeder John W. Galbreath paid owner Jean Ternynck a reported $1,350,000 to lease Sea-Bird for five years' stud duty at his Darby Dan Farm in Kentucky. After two one-year extensions of the lease, Sea-Bird returned to France, to the Haras du Petit Tellier thoroughbred breeding stables, following the 1972 breeding season but developed colitis and died in April 1973 after serving only a few mares in Europe. Among Sea-Bird's progeny were the dual French classic and 1974 Prix de l'Arc de Triomphe-winning mare Allez France (who had a Timeform rating of 136, making her still, according to that publication, the highest ever rated middle distance racemare); the 1974 Preakness and Belmont Stakes winner Little Current; the Champion Hurdle winner Sea Pigeon; and Gyr, second in the 1970 Epsom Derby behind the English Triple Crown winner Nijinsky II. Sea-Bird sired Reine Enchanteur, who sold for a then-world-record $405,000 at the 1968 Keeneland Sales, as well as the dams of King's Swan, who was known as the "King of Aqueduct", Miss Oceana, a millionaire in racing who sold as a broodmare for a world record US$7 million, and the half brothers Assert, the French Derby and Irish Derby winner, and Bikala, who won the French Derby. Sea-Bird was also the grandsire (through his son Arctic Tern) of the French Derby winner Bering. Sea-Bird was runner-up in the French sires' list in 1973 and 1974, was sixth in 1970 and was eighth in 1975. He was also third on the French broodmare sire list in 1981 and sixth in 1982. According to records kept by The Jockey Club, Sea-Bird sired 130 winners (74.3%) and 33 stakes winners (18.9%) from 175 named foals.

== Pedigree ==
Pedigree of Sea Bird
Sire Dan Cupid	Native Dancer	Polynesian	Unbreakable
Sire Dan Cupid	Native Dancer	Polynesian	Black Polly
Sire Dan Cupid	Native Dancer	Geisha	Discovery
Sire Dan Cupid	Native Dancer	Geisha	Miyako
Sire Dan Cupid	Vixenette	Sickle	Phalaris
Sire Dan Cupid	Vixenette	Sickle	Selene
Sire Dan Cupid	Vixenette	Lady Reynard	Gallant Fox
Sire Dan Cupid	Vixenette	Lady Reynard	Nerva
Dam Sicalade	Sicambre	Prince Bio	Prince Rose
Dam Sicalade	Sicambre	Prince Bio	Biologie
Dam Sicalade	Sicambre	Sif	Rialto
Dam Sicalade	Sicambre	Sif	Suavita
Dam Sicalade	Marmelade	Maurepas	Aethelstan
Dam Sicalade	Marmelade	Maurepas	Broceliande
Dam Sicalade	Marmelade	Couleur	Biribi
Dam Sicalade	Marmelade	Couleur	Colour Bar (Family 2-n)

== See also ==
- List of racehorses
