= Prix La Flèche =

- Class: Listed
- Location: Chantilly; France
- Race type: Flat / Thoroughbred
- Website: france-galop.com

Race information
- Distance: 1,000 metres (5f)
- Surface: Turf
- Track: Straight
- Qualification: Two-year-olds
- Weight: 58 kg Allowances; 1½ kg for fillies
- Purse: €60,000 (2023); 1st: €30,000

Prix La Flèche
2023
| The Fixer | Flers | Dorothy Lawrence |

Previous years
2022
| Wootton City | Vicious Harry | Funny Money Honey |
2021
| Dizzy Bizu | Anterselva | Ma Noire |

2020-2011
2020
Livachope | Pom Malpic | Winvalchope
2018
Sexy Metro | Show Must Go On | Sens Du Rythme
2017
Ardenode | Unfortunately | Mister Picnic
2016
Rapacity Alexander | Sans Equivoque | Fixette
2015
Venecia Style | Rive Neuve | Siderante
2014
El Suizo | Jane's Memory | Preciously
2013
Vorda | Muharaaj | Oeil De Tigre
2012
Penny's Picnic | El Trastolillo | To My Valentine
2011
Dijarvo | Ponte Vespucci | Robert Le Diable

2010-2001
2010
Miss Liberty | Magic Potion | Lone Cat
2009
Siyouni | Ladoga | Ascot Glory
2008
Percolator | Bargouzine | Bluster
2007
Natagora | Jane Blue | Etenia
2006
Sandwaki | Poltava | Take Blood
2005
Gwenseb | Set Alight | Lady Angele
2004
Salut Thomas | Lady Weasley | Semarang
2003
Much Faster | Mill Hour | Joursanvault
2002
Ascetic Silver | Softshoe | On Line
2001
Ingeburg | Dulce De Leche | Sa Premiere

2000-1990
2000
Noverre | Iron Mask | Ozone Layer
1999
City On A Hill | Harbour Island | Radhwa
1998
Ronda | Zirconi | Stella Berine
1997
Scenery | Zelding | Saralea
1996
Deep Finesse | Joyeuse Entree | Nombre Premier
1995
Shining Molly | Naninja | Premier De Cordee
1994
Top Shape | Luminoso | Lovely Fantasy
1993
Foxhound | Zindari | Melodie Royale
1992
Zieten | Creaking Board | Larguez Tout
1991
Arazi | Tabac | Valley Road
1990
Hector Protector | Stretford | Caerlina

The Prix La Flèche is a Listed flat horse race in France open to two-year-old thoroughbreds. It is run at Chantilly over a distance of 1,000 metres (about 5 furlongs), and it is scheduled to take place each year in June.

== History ==
The event was staged at Le Tremblay until the late 1960s, and was transferred to Évry in the 1970s. For a period its distance was 1,400 metres. It was subsequently contested over 1,300 metres (1984–86) and 1,200 metres (1987–92). It was shortened to 1,100 metres in 1993.

The Prix La Flèche was held at Chantilly from 1997 to 1999, and at Maisons-Laffitte from 2000 to 2003. It was switched to Longchamp and cut to 1,000 metres in 2004. It returned to Maisons-Laffitte in 2009, and has been run at Chantilly again since 2014.

The leading horses from the race often go on to compete in the Prix du Bois.

== Records ==
Leading jockey since 1977 (4 wins):

- Freddy Head – Ma Biche (1982), Minstrel's Lassie (1987), Hector Protector (1990), Arazi (1991)
- Christophe Soumillon – Ingeburg (2001), Salut Thomas (2004), Percolator (2008), Siyouni (2009)

Leading trainer since 1977 (5 wins):

- François Boutin – Stromboli (1977), Voukefalos (1978), Minstrel's Lassie (1987), Hector Protector (1990), Arazi (1991)

Leading owner since 1977 (3 wins):

- Sheikh Mohammed – Zieten (1992), Foxhound (1993), Scenery (1997)

== Winners since 1977 ==
| Year | Winner | Jockey | Trainer | Owner | Time |
|---|---|---|---|---|---|
| 1977 | Stromboli | Philippe Paquet | François Boutin | Jean Ternynck |
| 1978 | Voukefalos | Philippe Paquet | François Boutin | Peter Goulandris | 1:28.80 |
| 1979 | Lord Jack | Alfred Gibert | Henri Gleizes | Mrs François Elion |
| 1980 | Lalaria | Jean-Pierre Lefèvre | Philippe Lallié | Julian Byng |
| 1981 | Setkatdeu | Henri Samani | Raymond Touflan | Yves Duffaut |
| 1982 | Ma Biche | Freddy Head | Criquette Head | Ghislaine Head |
| 1983 | Micbol | Fabrice Pegurri | Jean Laumain | Henri Rabatel |
| 1984 | Light of Nashua | Alfred Gibert | André Fabre | Mahmoud Fustok |
| 1985 | Kandakiev | Yves Saint-Martin | Mitri Saliba | Adnan Moubarak |
| 1986 | Banc d'Or | Michel Gentile | Freddie Palmer | Mrs Freddie Palmer |
| 1987 | Minstrel's Lassie | Freddy Head | François Boutin | Allen Paulson |
| 1988 | Ecossais | Alfred Gibert | J. C. Cunnington | Countess Batthyany |
| 1989 | Cut My Heart | Philippe Dumortier | Jean-Claude Rouget | Claude Gour |
| 1990 | Hector Protector | Freddy Head | François Boutin | Stavros Niarchos | 1:10.86 |
| 1991 | Arazi | Freddy Head | François Boutin | Allen Paulson | 1:14.30 |
| 1992 | Zieten | Steve Cauthen | André Fabre | Sheikh Mohammed | 1:10.20 |
| 1993 | Foxhound | Thierry Jarnet | André Fabre | Sheikh Mohammed | 1:07.41 |
| 1994 | Top Shape | Gérald Mossé | François Doumen | John Killer | 1:05.91 |
| 1995 | Shining Molly | Franck Blondel | Marc Pimbonnet | Louis Peyraud | 1:06.35 |
| 1996 | Deep Finesse | Philip Robinson | Michael Jarvis | John Sims | 1:03.92 |
| 1997 | Scenery | Olivier Peslier | André Fabre | Sheikh Mohammed | 1:07.90 |
| 1998 | Ronda | Dominique Boeuf | Carlos Laffon-Parias | Dario Hinojosa | 1:09.50 |
| 1999 | City on a Hill | Sylvain Guillot | David Loder | Godolphin | 1:04.80 |
| 2000 | Noverre | Sylvain Guillot | David Loder | Godolphin | 1:03.40 |
| 2001 | Ingeburg | Christophe Soumillon | Axel Kleinkorres | Stall Juka | 1:07.10 |
| 2002 | Ascetic Silver | Thierry Jarnet | Didier Prod'homme | Bernard Giraudon | 1:05.54 |
| 2003 | Much Faster | Thierry Thulliez | Pascal Bary | Ecurie J. L. Bouchard | 1:06.80 |
| 2004 | Salut Thomas | Christophe Soumillon | Robert Collet | Roger Jesus | 0:57.60 |
| 2005 | Gwenseb | Davy Bonilla | Carlos Laffon-Parias | Wertheimer et Frère | 0:58.00 |
| 2006 | Sandwaki | Olivier Peslier | Carlos Laffon-Parias | Wertheimer et Frère | 0:58.50 |
| 2007 | Natagora | Christophe Lemaire | Pascal Bary | Stefan Friborg | 0:56.30 |
| 2008 | Percolator | Christophe Soumillon | Paul Cole | Henry Robinson | 0:56.60 |
| 2009 | Siyouni | Christophe Soumillon | Alain de Royer-Dupré | HH Aga Khan IV | 1:00.10 |
| 2010 | Miss Liberty | Maxime Guyon | Pia Brandt | Ecurie D. Primes | 1:00.60 |
| 2011 | Dijarvo | David Probert | Tony Carroll | Dijarvo Partnership | 0:59.20 |
| 2012 | Penny's Picnic | Thierry Jarnet | Didier Guillemin | Saint-Seine / Delegue | 1:01.40 |
| 2013 | Vorda | Grégory Benoist | Philippe Sogorb | Augustin-Normand / Picamau | 0:58.90 |
| 2014 | El Suizo | Fabrice Veron | Henri-Alex Pantall | Peter Rechsteiner | 0:58.23 |
| 2015 | Venecia Style | Grégory Benoist | Philippe Sogorb | Gerard Augustin-Normand | 0:58.82 |
| 2016 | Rapacity Alexander | Mickael Barzalona | David Evans | Noel O'Callaghan | 0:58.40 |
| 2017 | Ardenode | Fabrice Veron | Eoghan O'Neill | Susan Davis & Melissa O'Neill | 0:58.69 |
| 2018 | Sexy Metro | Cristian Demuro | Didier Guillemin | Gerard Augustin-Normand | 0:58.87 |
| 2019 | Real Appeal | Antoine Hamelin | Matthieu Palussiere | Theresa Marnane | 0:59.05 |
| 2020 | Livachope | Anthony Crastus | Jane Soubagne | Alain Chopard | 0:58.02 |
| 2021 | Dizzy Bizu | Theo Bachelot | Stephane Wattel | Peter Savill | 0:59.45 |
| 2022 | Wootton City | Mickael Barzalona | Jerome Reynier | Jean-Claude Seroul | 0:59.47 |
| 2023 | The Fixer | Mickael Barzalona | Francis-Henri Graffard | Stamford Bloodstock | 0:56.34 |
| 2025 | Graft | Cristian Demuro | Josephine Soudan | Chavancy, Kavangh and Soudan | 0:57.95 |

== Earlier winners ==
- 1908: Prestissimo
- 1909: Cerba
- 1910: Blina
- 1911: Quai des Fleurs
- 1912: Coupesarte
- 1913: Balancoire
- 1914: Rossendale
- 1921: Le Fanfaron
- 1922: Lizard
- 1923: Pot au Feu
- 1924: Etoile d'Argent
- 1925: Cerulea
- 1926: Salvandy
- 1927: Kantar
- 1928: Kassala
- 1929: Brise Lame
- 1930: Ammonite
- 1931: La Bourrasque
- 1932: Finnoise
- 1933: Fanar
- 1934: Aromate
- 1935: Sucrier
- 1936: Chenonceaux
- 1937: Trissino
- 1938: For My Love
- 1939: Maurepas
- 1942: Caravelle
- 1943: Orsova
- 1958: Savarus
- 1963: Sigebert
- 1964: Polly Girl
- 1966: Topyo
- 1968: La Milanaise
- 1969: Hand in Hand
- 1974: Sissoo
- 1976: Concerto Barocco

== See also ==
- List of French flat horse races
