= Prix Paul de Moussac =

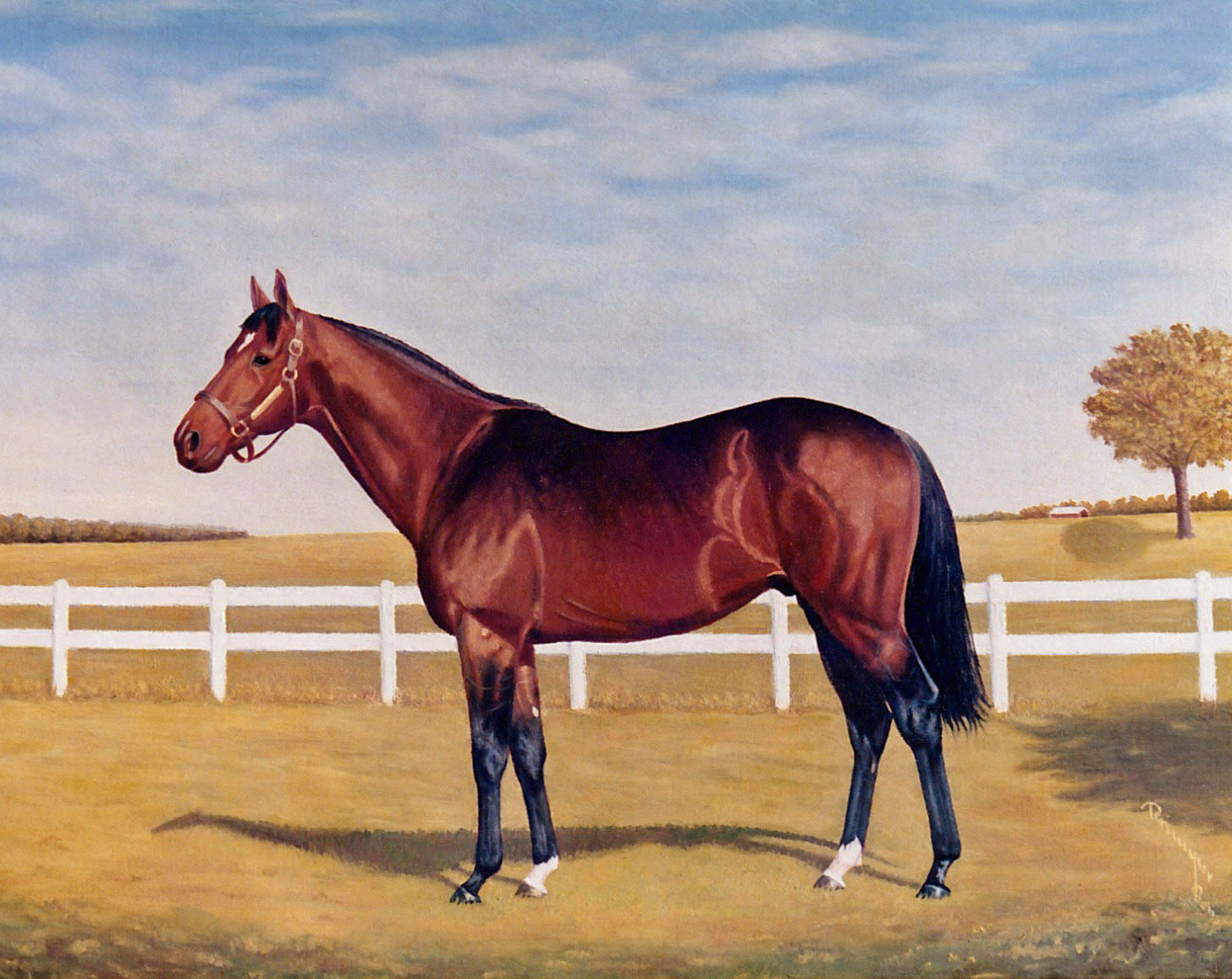
- Lou Piguet, oil on canvas Painting by Bob Demuyser (1920–2003)
- Class: Group 2
- Location: Chantilly Racecourse; Chantilly, France
- Inaugurated: 1909
- Race type: Flat / Thoroughbred
- Website: france-galop.com

Race information
- Distance: 1,600 metres (1 mile)
- Surface: Turf
- Track: Right-handed
- Qualification: Three-year-old colts and geldings exc. G1 winners this year
- Weight: 55½ kg Penalties; 3 kg for Group 1 winners * 2 kg for Group 2 winners * 1 kg for Group 3 winners * * since September 1 last year
- Purse: €80,000 (2023); 1st: €40,000

Prix Paul de Moussac
2025
Maranoa Charlie	Silius	Polyvega

Previous years
2024
Lazzat	Havana Cigar	Sajir
2023
Breizh Sky	Good Guess	Cawdor
2022
Erevann	Tribalist	Kalganov
2021
Erasmo	Best Lightning	Moai

2020-2011
2020
National Service	Kenway	Charlesquint
2019
Azano	Pizzicato	Admiral Rous
2018
Wusool	Magic Bibou	Wind Chimes
2017
Trais Fluors	Stunning Spirit	Roc Angel
2016
Zelzal	Moon Trouble	Degas
2015
Almanaar	Full Mast	De Treville
2014
Charm Spirit	Skyrockets	Army Bulletin
2013
Anodin	Silverfield	Gengis
2012
Rainbow Chic	Archbishop	Coupe De Ville
2011
Mutual Trust	Ch'Tio Bilote	Blue Soave

2010–2000
2010
Mr Bond	Blue Panis	Emerald Commander
2009
Oiseau De Feu	Handsome Maestro	Orizaba
2008
Arcadia's Angle	Senlis	Yorktown
2007
Asperity	Stoneside	Grand Vista
2006
Kentucky Dynamite	Kendargent	Racinger
2005
Turtle Bowl	Mathematician	Early March
2004
Art Master	Joursanvault	Charmo
2003
King's Drama	Green Channel	Balin's Sword
2002
Medecis	Jubilation	Caesarion
2001
Aghnoyoh	Domedriver	Rosi's Boy
2000
Cayoke	Indian Prospector	Crystal D'Ass

The Prix Paul de Moussac is a Group 2 flat horse race in France open to three-year-old thoroughbred colts and geldings. It is run at Chantilly over a distance of 1,600 metres (about 1 mile), and it is scheduled to take place each year in June.

== History ==
The event was established in 1909, and it was originally called the Prix de La Jonchere. It was named after La Jonchere, a successful racehorse in the 1870s. It was initially run at Longchamp over 1,400 metres, and it used to be open to horses aged three or older.

The Prix de La Jonchere was abandoned throughout World War I, with no running from 1915 to 1918. It was held at Le Tremblay for a period during World War II, from 1943 to 1945. Its distance was extended to 1,500 metres in 1966, and it increased to 1,600 metres in 1971. The event was restricted to three-year-olds in 1972.

The race continued to be staged at Longchamp until 1986. For several years thereafter it took place at Chantilly (1987–89, 1991, 1993), Saint-Cloud (1990, 1992) and Maisons-Laffitte (1994). It returned to Longchamp in 1995, and it was transferred to Chantilly in 1997.

In 2006 the event was renamed in memory of Paul de Moussac (1924–1995), a leading racehorse owner and breeder.

== Records ==
Most successful horse (2 wins):

- Rodosto – 1933, 1934
- Menetrier – 1948, 1949
- Luzon – 1952, 1953
- Calife – 1968, 1969

Leading jockey (6 wins):

- Roger Poincelet – Fanatique (1944), Menetrier (1948, 1949), Djebe (1950), Antler (1954), Fiftieth State (1962)
- Freddy Head – Lemmy (1967), Daring Display (1972), Satingo (1973), Avaray (1976), Bellypha (1979), What a Guest (1982)

Leading trainer (8 wins):

- André Fabre – Polish Precedent (1989), Metal Storm (1991), Sharman (1993), Freedom Cry (1994), Android (1996), Grazalema (1999), Art Master (2004), Mutual Trust (2011)

Leading owner (4 wins):

- Daniel Wildenstein – Faraway Son (1971), Boxing Day (1990), Freedom Cry (1994), Android (1996)

== Winners since 1978 ==
Year	Winner	Jockey	Trainer	Owner	Time
1978	Mannshour	Henri Samani	François Mathet	HH Aga Khan IV	1:45.10
1979	Bellypha	Freddy Head	Alec Head	Jacques Wertheimer	1:39.80
1980	Ruscelli	Yves Saint-Martin	Freddie Palmer	Akira Tomita	1:43.90
1981	Lou Piguet	Jean-Claude Desaint	J. C. Cunnington	Ezra Zilkha	1:45.70
1982	What a Guest	Freddy Head	Robert Collet	Owen Helman	1:42.70
1983	Aragon	Lester Piggott	John Dunlop	Jesus-Gil Escoin	1:45.80
1984	Majuscule	Cash Asmussen	François Boutin	Stavros Niarchos	1:43.80
1985	Mad Guard	Antoine Perrotta	Gérald Sauque	Mrs Salomon Nathan	1:39.20
1986	Magical Wonder	Cash Asmussen	Georges Mikhalidès	Mahmoud Fustok	1:39.80
1987	Soft Currency	Cash Asmussen	Pascal Bary	Ecurie I. M. Fares
1988	Squill	Gary W. Moore	Criquette Head	Etti Plesch	1:37.70
1989	Polish Precedent	Cash Asmussen	André Fabre	Sheikh Mohammed	1:42.60
1990	Boxing Day	Dominique Boeuf	Élie Lellouche	Daniel Wildenstein	1:43.40
1991	Metal Storm	Thierry Jarnet	André Fabre	Tony Richards	1:41.40
1992	Take Risks	Mathieu Boutin	Jean Lesbordes	David Tsui	1:47.70
1993	Sharman	Thierry Jarnet	André Fabre	Sheikh Mohammed	1:43.20
1994	Freedom Cry	Olivier Peslier	André Fabre	Daniel Wildenstein	1:40.10
1995	Gold and Steel	Jean-René Dubosc	Jean-Claude Rouget	Antonio Caro	1:39.60
1996	Android	Olivier Peslier	André Fabre	Daniel Wildenstein	1:43.40
1997	Kaldou Star	Thierry Thulliez	Élie Lellouche	Jean-Claude Seroul	1:41.00
1998	Silic	Sylvain Guillot	Pascal Bary	Ecurie Stella Maris	1:40.30
1999	Grazalema ^{[a]}	Alain Junk	André Fabre	Sheikh Mohammed	1:43.80
2000	Cayoke	Sylvain Guillot	Henri-Alex Pantall	Patricia Beck	1:39.90
2001	Aghnoyoh	Thierry Gillet	Tony Clout	Gerhard W. Sybrecht	1:38.30
2002	Medecis	Olivier Doleuze	Criquette Head-Maarek	Wertheimer et Frère	1:38.90
2003	King's Drama	Davy Bonilla	Robert Collet	Richard C. Strauss	1:39.10
2004	Art Master	Gary Stevens	André Fabre	Khalid Abdullah	1:38.00
2005	Turtle Bowl	Olivier Peslier	François Rohaut	Berend van Dalfsen	1:35.30
2006	Kentucky Dynamite	Christophe Lemaire	Alain de Royer-Dupré	Viktor Timoshenko	1:35.90
2007	Asperity	Frankie Dettori	John Gosden	George Strawbridge	1:35.60
2008	Arcadia's Angle	Christophe Lemaire	Pascal Bary	Niarchos Family	1:39.00
2009	Oiseau de Feu	Christophe Lemaire	Jean-Claude Rouget	Bernard Weill	1:37.30
2010	Sormiou ^{[b]}	Alexandre Roussel	Cyriaque Diard	Maurice Aubry	1:37.10
2011	Mutual Trust	Maxime Guyon	André Fabre	Khalid Abdullah	1:36.59
2012	Xanadou	Christophe Soumillon	Jean-Claude Rouget	Daniel-Yves Treves	1:38.30
2013	Anodin	Olivier Peslier	Freddy Head	Wertheimer et Frère	1:39.09
2014	Charm Spirit	Olivier Peslier	Freddy Head	Abdullah bin K. Al Thani	1:35.82
2015	Almanaar	Thierry Jarnet	Freddy Head	Hamdan Al Maktoum	1:35.52
2016	Zelzal	Gregory Benoist	Jean-Claude Rouget	Al Shaqab Racing	1:35.43
2017	Trais Fluors	Vincent Cheminaud	André Fabre	Scea Haras de Saint Pair	1:37.65
2018	Wusool	François-Xavier Bertras	François Rohaut	Hamdan Al Maktoum	1:35.35
2019	Azano	Robert Havlin	John Gosden	MJ & LA Taylor	1:35.96
2020	National Service	Tony Piccone	Gavin Hernon	Mme Erika Gilliar	1:39.97
2021	Erasmo	Mickael Barzalona	André Fabre	Godolphin	1:39.49
2022	Erevann	Christophe Soumillon	Jean-Claude Rouget	HH Aga Khan IV	1:38.35
2023	Breizh Sky	Maxime Guyon	A & G Botti	Alain Jathiere Et Al.	1:20.55
2024	Lazzat	Antonio Orani	Jerome Reynier	Nurlan Bizakov	1:19.79
2025	Maranoa Charlie	Aurélien Lemaitre	Christopher Head	Maher, Fitzgerald, Baxter	1:20.27
2026	Nighttime	Maxime Guyon	Christopher Head	Wertheimer et Frère	1:18.86

^{a} Irish Prize finished first in 1999, but he was relegated to fourth place following a stewards' inquiry.
^{b} The 2010 winner Sormiou was later exported to Hong Kong and renamed Mr Bond.

== Earlier winners ==
- 1909: Prestissimo
- 1910: Oversight
- 1911: Le Charmeur
- 1912: Calvados III
- 1913: Dagor
- 1914: Amilcar
- 1915–18: no race
- 1919: Mihran
- 1920: Maskara
- 1921: Glorious
- 1922:
- 1923:
- 1924: Perdicas
- 1925: Entrechat
- 1926: Millet
- 1927: Samphire
- 1928: King Arthur
- 1929:
- 1930: Palais Royal
- 1931: Dictateur VIII
- 1932:
- 1933: Rodosto
- 1934: Rodosto
- 1935: Jus de Raisin
- 1936: Ambrose Light
- 1937: Flying Thoughts
- 1938: Blue Star
- 1939: Emir d'Iran
- 1940: Corviglia
- 1941: Panipat
- 1942: Balthazar
- 1943: Dogat
- 1944: Fanatique
- 1945:
- 1946: Patchouly
- 1947: Dorogoi
- 1948: Menetrier
- 1949: Menetrier
- 1950: Djebe
- 1951: Bel Amour
- 1952: Luzon
- 1953: Luzon
- 1954: Antler
- 1955: Klairon
- 1956: Pas de Quatre
- 1957: Verrieres
- 1958: Sweet Home
- 1959: Radjah
- 1960: Trevieres
- 1961:
- 1962: Fiftieth State
- 1963: Catilina
- 1964:
- 1965: Nemours
- 1966: Radames
- 1967: Lemmy
- 1968: Calife
- 1969: Calife
- 1970: Bergano
- 1971: Faraway Son
- 1972: Daring Display
- 1973: Satingo
- 1974: Contraband
- 1975: Dandy Lute
- 1976: Avaray
- 1977: Lightning

== See also ==
- List of French flat horse races
- Recurring sporting events established in 1909 – this race is included under its original title, Prix de La Jonchere.
