= Prix Herod =

Flat horse race in France

- Class: Listed
- Location: Chantilly Racecourse; Chantilly, France
- Inaugurated: 1930
- Race type: Flat / Thoroughbred
- Website: france-galop.com

Race information
- Distance: 1,400 metres (7f)
- Surface: Turf
- Track: Right-handed
- Qualification: Two-year-olds excluding Listed winners and Group-placed horses
- Weight: 58 kg Allowances; 1½ kg for fillies
- Purse: €55,000 (2012); 1st: €27,500

Prix Herod
2023
| Zoum Zoum | Princess Child | Michigan Fire |

Previous years
2022
| Ritournelle | Got Socks | Denver Chop |
2021
| My Fancy | Rose Premium | Tribalist |

2020-2011
2020
Midtown | Best Lightning | Saqr
2019
Milltown Star | Ellerslie Lace | Choise Of Raison
2018
Amilcar | Dalika | Gloves Lynch
2017
Wind Chimes | Louis D'Or | Omaha Beach
2016
Red Onion | Charly Nova | Charm Appeal
2015
La Cressonniere | Fourioso | Jet Setting
2014
Wag'n Tail | Romeo Lima | Cornwallville
2013
La Hoguette | Petits Potins | Ascot Memory
2012
Kensea | Linngaro | Holy Dazzle
2011
Vaniloquio | Tycoon's Garden | Silver Northern

2010-2001
2010
Temps Au Temps | Stark Danon | Fariman
2009
Saying | Olvia | Ramble On
2008
Pride Dancer | Bum Bum | Good Bye My Friend
2007
Sceptre Rouge | El Rosa | Pallodio
2006
Stoneside | Chantra | Finikas
2005
Grand Vadla | Salsalava | Light Of Joy
2004
Campo Bueno | Silent Name | Josh
2003
Joyce | Chopoulou | Southern Queen
2002
Power Elite | Solo Tango | Viane
2001
Medecis | Great Deal | Celestial Lagoon

2000-1995
2000
Innit | Storm Boy | Aspiring Diva
1999
Radhwa | Touch Of The Blues | Perugina
1998
Berkoutchi | Stella Berine | Yes I Will
1997
Albacora | Gold Away | Worms
1996
Daylami | Bartex | Herakles
1995
Vitaba | Paix Royale | Zoukris

The Prix Herod is a Listed flat horse race in France open to two-year-old thoroughbreds. It is run at Chantilly over a distance of 1,400 metres (about 7 furlongs), and it is scheduled to take place each year in November.

== History ==
The event was established in 1930, and it was originally held at Le Tremblay. It was initially the first leg of a two-part series called the Prix Biennal Herod-Matchem. The second leg, for three-year-olds, was the Prix Matchem. The two parts were named after Herod and Matchem, foundation sires in the 18th century.

The early editions of the Prix Herod were contested over 1,400 metres. It was transferred to Évry in 1973, and from this point its distance was 1,600 metres.

The race was run at Saint-Cloud over 1,500 metres in 1997. For a period thereafter it was staged at Maisons-Laffitte over 1,400 metres. It was switched to Deauville in 2002, and shortened to 1,300 metres in 2004.

The Prix Herod moved to Longchamp and reverted to 1,400 metres in 2005. It was transferred to Chantilly in 2012. Prior to 2015 it took place in October.

== Records ==
Leading jockey since 1979 (3 wins):

- Dominique Boeuf – Groom Dancer (1986), Triteamtri (1987), Vitaba (1995)
- Gérald Mossé – Assombrie (1990), Mendocino (1991), Daylami (1996)
- Olivier Peslier – Berkoutchi (1998), Stoneside (2006), Saying (2009)
- Christophe Soumillon – Grand Vadla (2005), Sceptre Rouge (2007), Temps au Temps (2010)
- Thierry Thulliez – Innit (2000), Vaniloquio (2011), Red Onion (2016)

Leading trainer since 1979 (5 wins):

- François Boutin – Gilgit (1980), Flying Sauce (1982), Assombrie (1990), Mendocino (1991), Vitellozzi (1994)
- Robert Collet – Berkeley Court (1983), Captive Island (1984), Flying Trio (1985), Albacora (1997), Radhwa (1999)

Leading owner since 1979 (3 wins): (includes part ownership)

- HH Aga Khan IV – Daylami (1996), Grand Vadla (2005), Sceptre Rouge (2007)
- Gérard Augustin-Normand – Vaniloquio (2011), La Hoguette (2013), La Cressonniere (2015)

== Winners since 1979 ==
| Year | Winner | Jockey | Trainer | Owner | Time |
|---|---|---|---|---|---|
| 1979 | Forbidden Fruit | Henri Samani | P. Laloum | Mrs Marc Laloum |
| 1980 | Gilgit | Philippe Paquet | François Boutin | Stavros Niarchos |
| 1981 | African Joy | Serge Gorli | E. Chevalier du Fau | Hubert Mamo |
| 1982 | Flying Sauce | Alain Lequeux | François Boutin | Peter Goulandris |
| 1983 | Berkeley Court | Yves Saint-Martin | Robert Collet | Elias Zaccour |
| 1984 | Captive Island | Yves Saint-Martin | Robert Collet | Mrs Daniel Bertrand |
| 1985 | Flying Trio | Freddy Head | Robert Collet | Patrick Arnett |
| 1986 | Groom Dancer | Dominique Boeuf | Tony Clout | Marvin Warner |
| 1987 | Triteamtri | Dominique Boeuf | Tony Clout | Marvin Warner |
| 1988 | Silver Tornado | Tony Cruz | Georges Mikhalidès | Mahmoud Fustok |
| 1989 | Follidays | Éric Legrix | Jean-Marie Béguigné | Guy de Rothschild | 1:42.85 |
| 1990 | Assombrie | Gérald Mossé | François Boutin | Pierre Rossier | 1:39.38 |
| 1991 | Mendocino | Gérald Mossé | François Boutin | Allen Paulson | 1:41.69 |
| 1992 | Fastness | Cash Asmussen | David Smaga | Lord Weinstock | 1:38.49 |
| 1993 | Dare and Go | Olivier Doleuze | Criquette Head | Jacques Wertheimer | 1:48.37 |
| 1994 | Vitellozzi | Cash Asmussen | François Boutin | Sheikh Mohammed | 1:44.98 |
| 1995 | Vitaba | Dominique Boeuf | Pascal Bary | Jean-Louis Bouchard | 1:39.77 |
| 1996 | Daylami | Gérald Mossé | Alain de Royer-Dupré | HH Aga Khan IV | 1:44.37 |
| 1997 | Albacora | Thierry Jarnet | Robert Collet | Richard Strauss | 1:33.70 |
| 1998 | Berkoutchi | Olivier Peslier | Henri-Alex Pantall | Roland Monnier | 1:29.60 |
| 1999 | Radhwa | Sébastien Maillot | Robert Collet | Micheline Vidal | 1:28.90 |
| 2000 | Innit | Thierry Thulliez | Mick Channon | Tim Corby | 1:23.60 |
| 2001 | Medecis | Olivier Doleuze | Criquette Head-Maarek | Wertheimer et Frère | 1:32.90 |
| 2002 | Power Elite | Olivier Plaçais | André Fabre | Khalid Abdullah | 1:32.10 |
| 2003 | Joyce | L. Hammer-Hansen | Horst Steinmetz | Stall Nizza | 1:23.10 |
| 2004 | Campo Bueno | Gregory Benoist | Xavier Nakkachdji | B. Wayne Hughes | 1:19.90 |
| 2005 | Grand Vadla | Christophe Soumillon | André Fabre | HH Aga Khan IV | 1:27.60 |
| 2006 | Stoneside | Olivier Peslier | F. Rodriguez Puertas | Tony Forde | 1:21.30 |
| 2007 | Sceptre Rouge | Christophe Soumillon | Alain de Royer-Dupré | HH Aga Khan IV | 1:22.30 |
| 2008 | Pride Dancer | Stéphane Pasquier | Yan Durepaire | Cuadra La Cincha SL | 1:23.00 |
| 2009 | Saying | Olivier Peslier | Freddy Head | Wertheimer et Frère | 1:25.10 |
| 2010 | Temps au Temps | Christophe Soumillon | Mikel Delzangles | Marquesa de Moratalla | 1:23.80 |
| 2011 | Vaniloquio | Thierry Thulliez | Nicolas Clément | Baillet / Augustin-Normand | 1:26.03 |
| 2012 | Kensea | Fabrice Veron | Henri-Alex Pantall | Guy Pariente | 1:31.80 |
| 2013 | La Hoguette | Gregory Benoist | Jean-Claude Rouget | Gérard Augustin-Normand | 1:26.60 |
| 2014 | Wag'n Tail | Stéphane Pasquier | Christian Delcher-Sanchez | Safsaf Canarias Srl | 1:27.07 |
| 2015 | La Cressonniere | Cristian Demuro | Jean-Claude Rouget | Caro / Augustin-Normand | 1:31.63 |
| 2016 | Red Onion | Thierry Thulliez | Carlos Lerner | Ecurie Salabi | 1:30.10 |
| 2017 | Wind Chimes | Pierre-Charles Boudot | André Fabre | Smith/Magnier/Tabor | 1:29.78 |
| 2018 | Amilcar | Pierre-Charles Boudot | Henri-Alex Pantall | E Alhtoushi | 1:32.99 |
| 2019 | Milltown Star | Gérald Mossé | Mick Channon | Hunscote Stud Limited | 1:32.37 |
| 2020 | Midtown | Mickael Barzalona | André Fabre | Godolphin SNC | 1:36.12 |
| 2022 | Ritournelle | Tony Piccone | J Reynier | Jean-Claude Seroul | 1:37.82 |
| 2023 | Zoum Zoum | Rob Hornby | Ralph Beckett | Mrs Lynn Turner | 1:39.96 |

== Earlier winners ==
- 1930: Pearl Cap
- 1931: Laeken
- 1932: Rodosto
- 1933: Astronomer
- 1934: The Nile
- 1935: Gong
- 1936: En Fraude
- 1937: Trissino
- 1938: Billy of Spain
- 1949: Fontaine
- 1956: Denisy
- 1957: Hermance
- 1959: Wordpam
- 1960: Ploermel
- 1962: Partisane
- 1966: Tiepolo
- 1969: Without Fear
- 1970: Irish Ball
- 1971: Lyphard
- 1972: Robertino
- 1973: Kamaraan
- 1974: Karad
- 1976: Conglomerat
- 1977: Jik

== See also ==
- List of French flat horse races
