= Prix Yacowlef =

- Class: Listed
- Location: Chantilly Racecourse; Chantilly, France
- Race type: Flat / Thoroughbred
- Website: france-galop.com

Race information
- Distance: 1,000 metres (5f)
- Surface: Turf
- Track: Straight
- Qualification: Two-year-olds previously unraced
- Weight: 58 kg Allowances; 1½ kg for fillies
- Purse: €55,000 (2012); 1st: €27,500

Prix Yacowlef
2024
Apollo Fountain	Kaadi	Binadham

Previous years
2023
Myconian	Salva Mea	Pour Dompter
2022
Sivana	Wootton City	Malrescia
2021
Choux	Papa Don't Preach	Royal Ashirah

2020-2011
2020
Suesa	Total Knockout	Night Hunting
2019
Keep Busy	Bavaria Baby	Ernesto De La Cruz
2018
Barbill	Rockin Roy	Yulong Minister
2017
Absolute City	Fastidious	The Broghie Man
2016
Simmie	Precieuse	Rajar
2015
Sangria	Kotama	Diabolo James
2014
Mocklershill	South Bank	Power Of The Moon
2013
Make It Reel	Stormyra	Royale Du Buisson
2012
Pearl Flute	Style Vendome	Wingate
2011
Hi Molly	Kortoba	Barbayam

2010-2001
2010
Wizz Kid	Katerini	Nitza
2009
Sorciere	Special Duty	Mata Keranjang
2008
Abbeyside	Pure Joy	Privalova
2007
Stern Opinion	African Rose	Kadance Blue
2006
Beauty Is Truth	Hitra	Miximaa
2005
New Girlfriend	Summer Melody	Thamarat
2004
Speciale	Nipping	Sailor King
2003
Roseanna	Chineur	Taygete
2002
Loving Pride	Canda	Traou Mad
2001
Barsine	Cedar Sea	Danseuse D'Etoile

2000-1990
2000
Wooden Doll	Amonita	Jandool
1999
Mall Queen	Where's Dave	Bluemamba
1998
Royal Arrow	Ne Coupez Pas	Dancing Maestro
1997
Seralia	Allessandra	Lunata
1996
Pas De Reponse	Imia	Massillon
1995
Sangria	West Memphis	Titus Livius
1994
Batista	Viva Nureyev	Pretty Davis
1993
Eternal Reve	Key Of Luck	Celtic Arms
1992
Wixon	Gold Splash	Berdansk
1991
Silver Kite	Secret Talent	Mythomania
1990
Bague Bleue	Crack Regiment	Touch And Love

The Prix Yacowlef is a Listed flat horse race in France open to two-year-old thoroughbreds. Since 2016, it is run each November at Chantilly Racecourse over a distance of 1,000 metres (about 5 furlongs).

The event was originally run at Deauville Racecourse and restricted to previously unraced horses. For a period its distance was 1,000 metres, and it was extended to 1,200 metres in 1987.

The Prix Yacowlef was formerly held in early August. It was switched to July and reverted to 1,000 metres in 2005. From 2016 the race moved to its current date and venue.

== Records since 1978 ==
Leading jockey (7 wins):

- Freddy Head – Princesse Lida (1979), Siagne (1982), Breath Taking (1984), Common Grounds (1987), Machiavellian (1989), Wixon (1992), Pas de Reponse (1996)

Leading trainer (9 wins):

- Criquette Head-Maarek – Siagne (1982), Breath Taking (1984), Goldneyev (1988), Pas de Reponse (1996), Mall Queen (1999), Wooden Doll (2000), Loving Pride (2002), Roseanna (2003), Speciale (2004)

Leading owner (3 wins):

- Stavros Niarchos – Captain's Gold (1983), Common Grounds (1987), Machiavellian (1989)
- Maktoum Al Maktoum – Royal Arrow (1998), Mall Queen (1999), Loving Pride (2002)

== Winners since 1978 ==
Year	Winner	Jockey	Trainer	Owner	Time
1978	Water Lily	Alfred Gibert	Peter Head	Sir Robin McAlpine	1:03.90
1979	Princesse Lida	Freddy Head	Alec Head	Jacques Wertheimer
1980	Miswaki	Philippe Paquet	François Boutin	Etti Plesch	1:02.20
1981	Macaroy	Jacques Dupin	Noël Pelat	Marquis de Geoffre
1982	Siagne	Freddy Head	Criquette Head	Haras d'Etreham
1983	Captain's Gold	Cash Asmussen	François Boutin	Stavros Niarchos
1984	Breath Taking	Freddy Head	Criquette Head	Robert Sangster
1985	River Dancer	Maurice Philipperon	John Cunnington Jr.	Sir Michael Sobell
1986	La Grande Epoque	Gary W. Moore	John Fellows	Robin Scully
1987	Common Grounds	Freddy Head	François Boutin	Stavros Niarchos
1988	Goldneyev	Gary W. Moore	Criquette Head	Jacques Wertheimer
1989	Machiavellian	Freddy Head	François Boutin	Stavros Niarchos	1:13.00
1990	Bague Bleue	Dominique Boeuf	Élie Lellouche	Daniel Wildenstein	1:12.70
1991	Silver Kite	Thierry Jarnet	André Fabre	Zenya Yoshida	1:13.60
1992	Wixon	Freddy Head	François Boutin	Allen Paulson	1:13.60
1993	Eternal Reve	Cash Asmussen	François Boutin	Mrs François Boutin	1:15.90
1994	Batista	Cash Asmussen	François Boutin	Sheikh Mohammed	1:12.80
1995	Sangria	Guy Guignard	John Fellows	Peggy Augustus	1:13.80
1996	Pas de Reponse	Freddy Head	Criquette Head	Wertheimer et Frère	1:14.20
1997	Seralia	Sylvain Guillot	Pascal Bary	Lady O'Reilly	1:12.60
1998	Royal Arrow	Olivier Peslier	André Fabre	Maktoum Al Maktoum	1:14.50
1999	Mall Queen	Olivier Doleuze	Criquette Head	Maktoum Al Maktoum	1:13.70
2000	Wooden Doll	Olivier Doleuze	Criquette Head	Khalid Abdullah	1:12.80
2001	Barsine	Gérald Mossé	Carlos Laffon-Parias	Felipe Hinojosa	1:12.60
2002	Loving Pride	Olivier Doleuze	Criquette Head-Maarek	Maktoum Al Maktoum	1:14.70
2003	Roseanna	Olivier Peslier	Criquette Head-Maarek	Peter Savill	1:12.60
2004	Speciale	Christophe Lemaire	Criquette Head-Maarek	Ghislaine Head	1:10.50
2005	New Girlfriend	Christophe Soumillon	Robert Collet	Richard Strauss	0:59.50
2006	Beauty Is Truth	Christophe Soumillon	Robert Collet	Richard Strauss	1:00.10
2007	Stern Opinion	Stéphane Pasquier	Pascal Bary	Khalid Abdullah	1:00.90
2008	Abbeyside	Christophe Soumillon	Paul Cole	Carmen Burrell	0:58.40
2009	Sorciere	Yann Lerner	Carlos Lerner	Lady O'Reilly	0:58.60
2010	Wizz Kid	Gregory Benoist	Robert Collet	Maeve Mahony	0:57.90
2011	Hi Molly	Thierry Jarnet	Didier Guillemin	Alain Morice	1:00.00
2012	Pearl Flute	Christophe Lemaire	Francis-Henri Graffard	Pearl Bloodstock Ltd	0:58.00
2013	Make It Reel	Thierry Thulliez	Pascal Bary	Emmeline de Waldner	0:59.01
2014	Mocklershill	Christophe Lemaire	Fabrice Chappet	Antoine Gilbert	0:59.03
2015	Money Maker (Note: The 2015 winner Money Maker was later exported to Hong Kong and renamed Sangria)	Cristian Demuro	Fabrice Chappet	Meridian / Watt	0:58.40
2016	Simmie	Gregory Benoist	Sylvester Kirk	Neil Simpson	1:06.88
2017	Absolute City	Nicolas Perret	Jean-Pierre Gauvin	Jean-Claude Seroul	1:06.60
2018	Barbill	Gerald Mosse	Mick Channon	Susan Bunney	1:07.33
2019	Keep Busy	Ioritz Mendizabal	John Quinn	Altitude Racing	1:11.80
2020	Suesa	Olivier Peslier	Carlos Laffon-Parias	Georgiana Cabrero	1:09.73

== Earlier winners ==
- 1885: Sycomore
- 1891: Fontenoy
- 1892: Senegal
- 1895: Arreau
- 1896: Indian Chief
- 1897: Le Roi Soleil
- 1898: Niphon
- 1899: Delvino
- 1900: Kadikoi
- 1901: Impromptu
- 1903: Gouvernant
- 1904: Jardy
- 1906: Madge
- 1907: Pernambouc
- 1909: Uriel
- 1911: La Semillante
- 1912: Banshee
- 1913: Sardanapale
- 1919: Jane Eyre
- 1920: Xanthis
- 1921: Despard
- 1922: Épinard
- 1923: Shahabbas
- 1924: Ptolemy
- 1925: Saint Fortunat
- 1926: Little Muff
- 1927: Miel Rosa
- 1928: Mirabilis
- 1929: Energie
- 1930: Quatre Bras
- 1931: Darya Awurd
- 1932: On Parade
- 1933: Laque d'Or
- 1934: The Nile
- 1935: Fragrance
- 1936: En Fraude
- 1937: La Sultane
- 1938: Lactone
- 1939: Balthazar
- 1941: Nosca
- 1944: Roi d'Atout
- 1946: Le Lavandou
- 1947: Djeddah
- 1953: Sena
- 1954: Chingacgook
- 1955: Apollonia
- 1956: Mourne
- 1961: Prudent
- 1962: Hula Dancer
- 1963: Homely
- 1968: Gris Vitesse
- 1969: Chatter Box
- 1970: Take a Chance
- 1971: Riverman
- 1972: Dahlia
- 1973: Nonoalco
- 1975: Manado
- 1976: Assez Cuite

== See also ==
- List of French flat horse races
