= Rodosto (horse) =

French-bred Thoroughbred racehorse

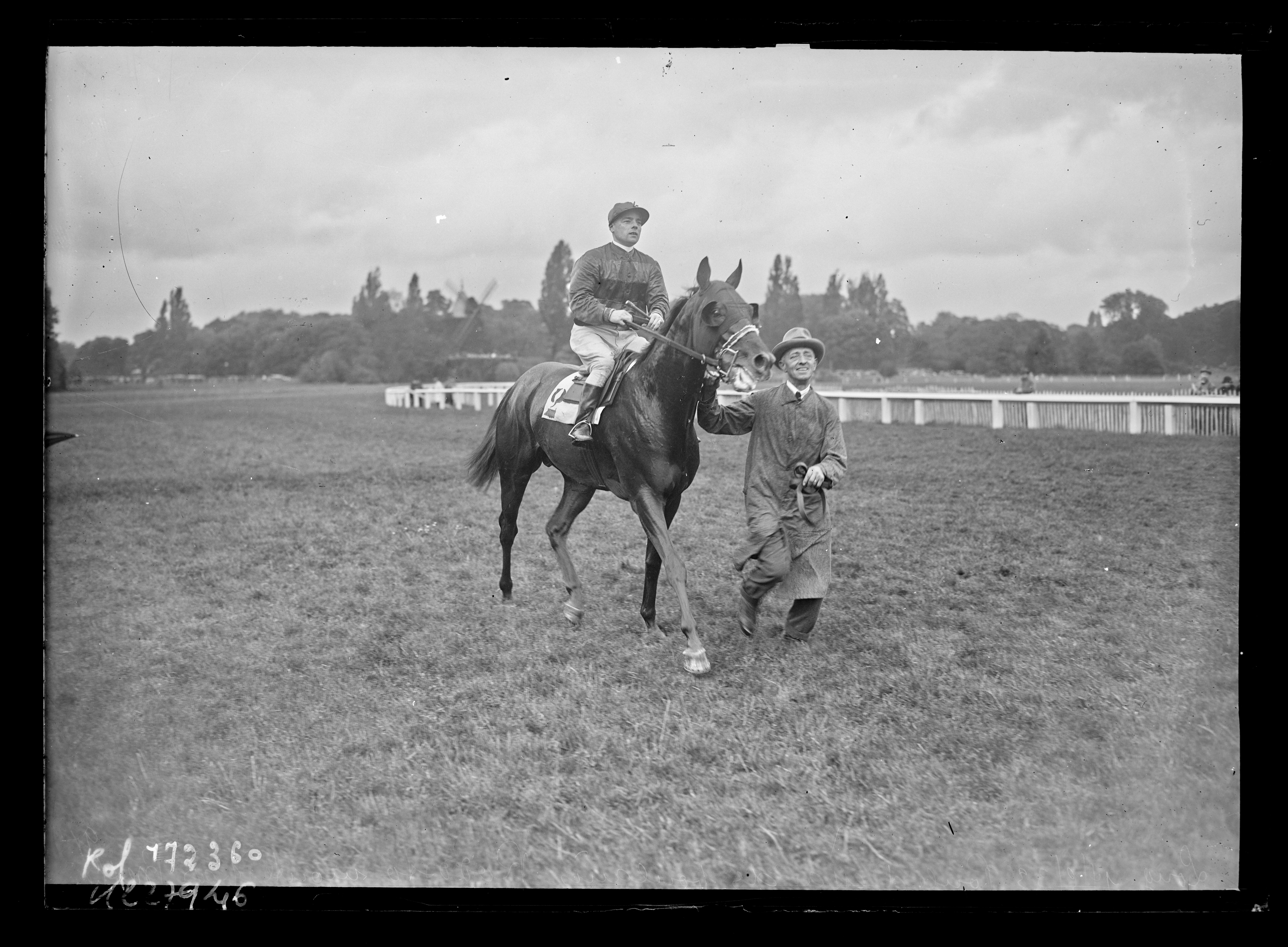
- 14 May 1933, Longchamp
- Sire: Épinard
- Grandsire: Badajoz
- Dam: Ramondie
- Damsire: Neil Gow
- Sex: Stallion
- Foaled: 1930
- Country: France
- Colour: Chestnut
- Breeder: Henri Corbiere
- Owner: Princess de Faucigny-Lucinge
- Trainer: Henry Count
- Record: 16: 8-2-4 (incomplete)

Major wins
- Prix Herod (1932); Prix de La Jonchere (1933, 1934); 2000 Guineas (1933); Poule d'Essai des Poulains (1933); Prix des Sablons (1934); Prix d'Ispahan (1934); Prix du Chemin de Fer du Nord (1934)

Rodosto (1930 – after 1954) was a French Thoroughbred racehorse and sire. He showed very good form as a juvenile in 1932 when he won the Prix Herod and was placed in both the Prix Robert Papin and the Prix Morny. In the following spring he won the Prix de La Jonchere and then became the first horse to win both the 2000 Guineas and Poule d'Essai des Poulains. He missed the Epsom Derby through injury and failed to recover his form that year. As a four-year-old he won a second Prix de La Jonchere before going on to win the Prix des Sablons, Prix d'Ispahan and Prix du Chemin de Fer du Nord. After his retirement from racing Rodosto had some success at a breeding stallion in France and Argentina.

== Background ==
Rodosto was a good-looking chestnut horse bred in France by Henri Corbiere at his Nonant-le-Pin stud. As a yearling he was offered for sale and bought for the equivalent of £3,314 by the Princesse de Faucigny-Lucinge. During his racing career he was trained by Henry Count.

He was one of the best horses sired by Épinard, a French champion who also competed with distinction in Britain and the United States. Épinard was a representative of the Byerley Turk sire line, unlike more than 95% of modern thoroughbreds, who descend directly from the Darley Arabian. Rodosto's dam Ramondie also produced Chateau Bouscaut whose victories included the Prix de la Forêt, Prix du Jockey-Club, Grand Prix de Paris and Prix du Cadran.

== Racing career ==
=== 1932: two-year-old season ===
In the summer of 1932 the two-year-old Rodosto was matched against the strongest opposition in France, finishing second to Coque de Noix in the Prix Robert Papin and third to Cecias in the Prix Morny. He recorded his biggest win of the season in autumn when he won the Prix Herod over 1400 metres at Le Tremblay.

=== 1933: three-year-old season ===
Rodosto began his second season by winning the Prix Citroën over 1400 metres at Longchamp Racecourse on 17 April. Nine days later the colt was sent to England for the 125th running of the 2000 Guineas over the Rowley Mile at Newmarket Racecourse. Manitoba, the top-rated British two-year-old colt of 1932, started favourite ahead of Colorow (July Stakes) and Harinero (Greenham Stakes) with Rodosto, ridden by Roger Brethes, the 9/1 fourth choice in a 27-runner field. The French challenger settled just behind the leaders before going to the front two furlongs out and stayed on strongly to win by a length from King Salmon with three quarters of a length back to Gino in third place. In the closing stages Brethes reportedly urged on his mount by shouting "Allez! Allez! Allez!", leading a local observer to state that such things were "not done" in English racing. The Princesse de Faucigny-Lucinge missed the contest having fallen ill on the journey from Paris: according to Rodosto's trainer the Princess, who was described as "dainty and petite" may have become nervous and upset by the excitement surrounding the race.

Rodosto returned to France for the French equivalent of the 2000 Guineas, the Poule d'Essai des Poulains over 1600 metres at Longchamp on 14 May in which showed "grit and determination" to win narrowly from Commander and Vertigineux and became the first horse to complete the double. Later that month he returned to England for the Epsom Derby, accompanied by an entourage which included several security personnel, although his most reliable guard, a large Alsatian dog was denied entry to the country. He was disputing favouritism in the betting with the eventual winner Hyperion but was withdrawn after suffering an attack of cramp on the eve of the race.

In the Grand Prix de Paris on 25 June Rodosto ran unplaced after being hampered by "scrimmaging", but then ran poorly when failing to stay the distance and finishing down the field in the Prix du Président de la République at Saint-Cloud Racecourse in July. In autumn over 1400 metres at Longchamp Rodosto finished second to the two-year-old Jocrisse in the Prix de la Forêt.

=== 1934: four-year-old season ===
On his first start as a four-year-old Rodosto finished third behind Le Centaure and Assuerus in the Prix Exbury over 2000 metres at Saint-Cloud Racecourse in March. In April Rodosto attempted to take the Prix de La Jonchere for a second time, but appeared to have lost his chance by swerving at the start and losing several lengths. He recovered well however, joined the leader Quartz in the straight and drew ahead in the closing stages to win by one and a half lengths.

On his next appearance he defeated Pantalon to take the Prix des Sablons over 2100 metres at Longchamp. Another major win came in May when he won the Prix d'Ispahan from Jus de Raisin and Dean Swift. He followed up in June with a victory in the Prix du Chemin de Fer du Nord. He later finished third to Rentenmark in the Prix du Point du Jour at Craon.

== Assessment and honours ==
In their book, A Century of Champions, based on the Timeform rating system, John Randall and Tony Morris rated Rodosto an "average" winner of the 2000 Guineas.

== Stud record ==
Rodosto was retired from racing to become a breeding stallion in France before being exported to Argentina in 1946. The best of his offspring included Dogat (Poule d'Essai des Pouliches, Prix Jacques Le Marois), Flying Call (Prix Daphnis, Oettingen-Rennen) and Pampre d'Or (Prix Daphnis, Prix La Force)

== Sire line tree ==
- Rodosto
  - Flying Call
  - Raphael
  - Pampre D'Or
  - Dogat
    - Trouville
      - Red Slipper

== Pedigree ==
Pedigree of Rodosto (FR), chestnut stallion, 1930
Sire Épinard (FR) 1920	Badajoz; 1907	Gost	Callistrate
Sire Épinard (FR) 1920	Badajoz; 1907	Gost	Georgina
Sire Épinard (FR) 1920	Badajoz; 1907	Selected (GB)	Raeburn
Sire Épinard (FR) 1920	Badajoz; 1907	Selected (GB)	Il Segreto
Sire Épinard (FR) 1920	Epine Blanche; 1913	Rock Sand (GB)	Sainfoin
Sire Épinard (FR) 1920	Epine Blanche; 1913	Rock Sand (GB)	Roquebrune
Sire Épinard (FR) 1920	Epine Blanche; 1913	White Thorn (USA)	Nasturtium
Sire Épinard (FR) 1920	Epine Blanche; 1913	White Thorn (USA)	Thorn Blossom
Dam Ramondie (FR) 1920	Neil Gow (GB); 1907	Marco	Barcaldine (IRE)
Dam Ramondie (FR) 1920	Neil Gow (GB); 1907	Marco	Novitiate
Dam Ramondie (FR) 1920	Neil Gow (GB); 1907	Chelandry	Goldfinch
Dam Ramondie (FR) 1920	Neil Gow (GB); 1907	Chelandry	Illuminata
Dam Ramondie (FR) 1920	La Rille; 1908	Macdonald	Bay Ronald (GB)
Dam Ramondie (FR) 1920	La Rille; 1908	Macdonald	Myrtledine (GB)
Dam Ramondie (FR) 1920	La Rille; 1908	Recaldia	Boudoir
Dam Ramondie (FR) 1920	La Rille; 1908	Recaldia	Randfontein (Family: 7-d)
