= Prix Robert Papin =

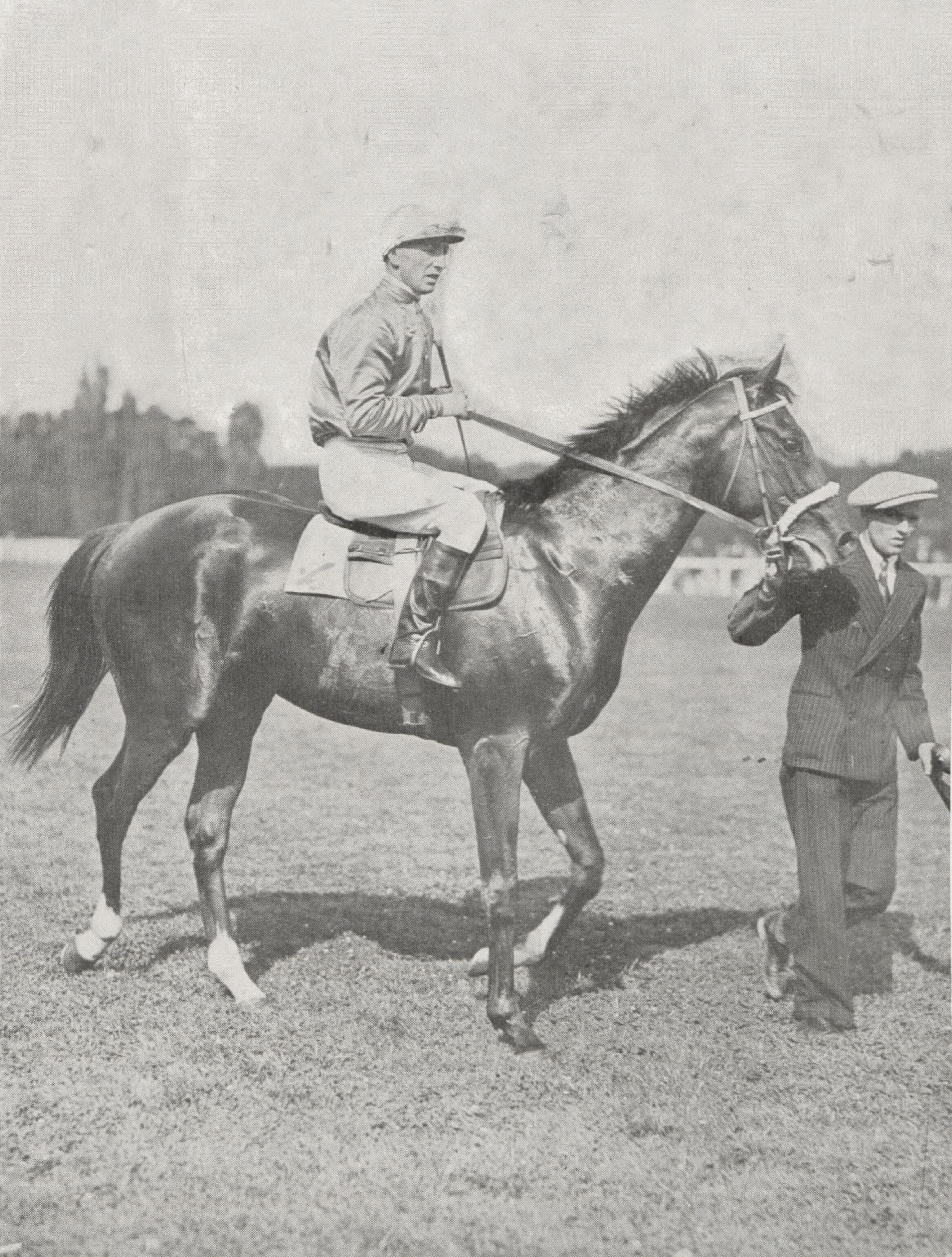
- 1933 winner Brantôme
- Class: Group 2
- Location: Chantilly; France
- Inaugurated: 1892
- Race type: Flat / Thoroughbred
- Sponsor: Darley (2022)
- Website: france-galop.com

Race information
- Distance: 1,200 metres (6f)
- Surface: Turf
- Track: Straight
- Qualification: Two-year-olds
- Weight: 58 kg Allowances; 1½ kg for fillies
- Purse: €130,000 (2022); 1st: €74,100

Prix Robert Papin
2025
Green Sense	Super Soldier	Tadej

Previous years
2024
Arabie	Shadow Army	Celandine
2023
Ramatuelle	His Majesty	Classic Flower
2022
Blackbeard	The Antarctic	Vicious Harry
2021
Atomic Force	Baghed	Hellomydarlin

2020-2011
2020
Ventura Tormenta	The Lir Jet	Tiger Tanaka
2019
A'Ali	My Love's Passion	Jolie
2018
Signora Cabello	Sexy Metro	True Mason
2017
Unfortunately	Frozen Angel	Heartache
2016
Tis Marvellous	Al Johrah	Hargeisa
2014
Kool Kompany	Strath Burn	Lehaim
2013
Vorda	Omaticaya	Vedeux
2012
Reckless Abandon	Sir Prancealot	Snowday
2011
Family One	Louve Rouge	Mac Row

2010–2001
2010
Prolific Champion	Broox	Approve
2009
Special Duty	Siyouni	Dolled Up
2008
Lui Rei	Percolator	Senor Mirasol
2007
Natagora	Magritte	Strike The Deal
2006
Boccassini	Golden Titus	Magic America
2005
New Girlfriend	Queensalsa	Gwenseb
2004
Divine Proportions	Shifting Place	Portrayal
2003
Much Faster	Colossus	Leila
2002
Never A Doubt	Zinziberine	Ela Merici
2001
Zipping	Massarra	Slap Shot

2000-1991
2000
Rolly Polly	Iron Mask	Bram Stoker
1999
Rossini	Auenklang	Finnan
1998
Black Amber	Bertolini	Imperfect World
1997
Greenlander	Aurigny	Zelding
1996
Ocean Ridge	Nombre Premier	Sheer Reason
1995
Lucky Lionel	Shining Molly	Barricade
1994
General Monash	Tereshkova	Expelled
1993
Psychobabble	Lake Country	Far Mist
1992
Didyme	Creaking Board	Rouquette
1991
Arazi	Showbrook	Steinbeck

1990-1988
1990
Danseuse Du Soir	Divine Danse	The Perfect Life
1989
Ozone Friendly	Zinarelle	Mill Lady
1988
Philippi	Money Movers	Superpower

The Prix Robert Papin is a Group 2 flat horse race in France open to two-year-old thoroughbred colts and fillies. It is run at Chantilly over a distance of 1,200 metres (about 6 furlongs), and it is scheduled to take place each year in July.

== History ==
The event was established in 1892, and it was originally called the Omnium de Deux Ans. It was initially run over 1,100 metres, and was extended to 1,200 metres in 1903. For a period it was held in early August, and it was one of France's first two-year-old races of the season. It reverted to 1,100 metres in 1907, and from this point juveniles could be raced earlier in the year.

The Omnium de Deux Ans was the country's richest race for two-year-olds until 1914. Its prize fund was greater than those of both the Prix Morny and the Grand Critérium. It was abandoned throughout World War I, with no running from 1915 to 1918.

The race was renamed in memory of Robert Papin (1848–1926), a former president of the Société Sportive d'Encouragement, in 1928. It was increased to 1,200 metres in 1929.

Robert Papin (1848–1926), president of the Société Sportive d'Encouragement

The Prix Robert Papin was held at Auteuil in 1940. On this occasion it was contested over 1,400 metres in late October. Its regular length was cut to 1,100 metres in 1942. It was run at Longchamp over 1,000 metres in 1944. Its distance returned to 1,200 metres in 1946, and it began its current spell over 1,100 metres in 1963.

The present system of race grading was introduced in 1971, and the Prix Robert Papin was given Group 1 status. It was relegated to Group 2 level in 1987.

Under Maisons-Laffitte Racecourse are closure on 2020, Prix Robert Papin moved to Chantilly and the race is eligible for geldings .

== Records ==
Leading jockey (7 wins):

- Roger Poincelet – Chesterfield (1946), Coronation (1948), Emperor (1949), Fiere (1955), Neptune (1957), Sly Pola (1959), High Bulk (1960)

Leading trainer (9 wins):

- Charles Semblat – Ardan (1943), Nirgal (1945), Coronation (1948), Emperor (1949), Pharsale (1950), Auriban (1951), Pharel (1952), Cordova (1953), Fiere (1955)

Leading owner (8 wins):

- Marcel Boussac – Ardan (1943), Nirgal (1945), Coronation (1948), Emperor (1949), Pharsale (1950), Auriban (1951), Pharel (1952), Cordova (1953)

== Winners since 1976 ==
Year	Winner	Jockey	Trainer	Owner	Time
1975	Vitiges	Gérard Rivases	Gérard Philippeau	Mrs Marc Laloum	1:06.00
1976	Blushing Groom	Henri Samani	François Mathet	HH Aga Khan IV	1:04.80
1977	Vific ^{[a]}	Philippe Paquet	François Boutin	Jean Ternynck	1:03.70
1978	Pitasia	Alfred Gibert	Aage Paus	Sir Douglas Clague	1:06.90
1979	Choucri	Alain Lequeux	Maurice Zilber	Naji Nahas	1:05.70
1980	Irish Playboy	Alain Lequeux	Olivier Douieb	Sir Gordon White	1:05.40
1981	Maelstrom Lake	Georges Doleuze	Edouard Bartholomew	Jacques Feuillard	1:05.60
1982	Ma Biche	Freddy Head	Criquette Head	Ghislaine Head	1:05.30
1983	Masarika	Yves Saint-Martin	Alain de Royer-Dupré	HH Aga Khan IV	1:05.30
1984	Seven Springs	Gary W. Moore	John Fellows	Robin Scully	1:06.30
1985	Baiser Vole	Freddy Head	Criquette Head	Robert Sangster	1:05.50
1986	Balbonella	Yves Saint-Martin	François Rohaut	Maktoum Al Maktoum	1:05.80
1987	Balawaki	Gary W. Moore	Criquette Head	Ghislaine Head	1:07.70
1988	Philippi	Alfred Gibert	J. C. Cunnington	Countess Batthyany	1:05.20
1989	Ozone Friendly	Pat Eddery	Barry Hills	Bill Gredley	1:06.30
1990	Danseuse du Soir	Dominique Boeuf	Élie Lellouche	Daniel Wildenstein	1:07.40
1991	Arazi	Gérald Mossé	François Boutin	Allen Paulson	1:05.50
1992	Didyme	Gérald Mossé	Criquette Head	Jacques Wertheimer	1:04.50
1993	Psychobabble	Cash Asmussen	Criquette Head	Stavros Niarchos	1:06.80
1994	General Monash	Brent Thomson	Peter Chapple-Hyam	Robert Sangster	1:06.40
1995	Lucky Lionel	John Reid	Richard Hannon Sr.	Antonio Balzarini	1:06.10
1996	Ocean Ridge	Thierry Jarnet	Peter Chapple-Hyam	Robert Sangster	1:05.90
1997	Greenlander	Sylvain Guillot	Clive Brittain	Marwan Al Maktoum	1:04.90
1998	Black Amber	Cash Asmussen	Neville Callaghan	Tabor / Magnier	1:05.90
1999	Rossini	Michael Kinane	Aidan O'Brien	Tabor / Magnier	1:07.20
2000	Rolly Polly	Mirco Demuro	Bruno Grizzetti	Mack Ferrer SRL	1:04.20
2001	Zipping	Davy Bonilla	Robert Collet	Richard Strauss	1:05.30
2002	Never a Doubt	Michael Hills	Barry Hills	Derek James	1:05.60
2003	Much Faster	Thierry Thulliez	Pascal Bary	Ecurie J. L. Bouchard	1:07.30
2004	Divine Proportions	Christophe Lemaire	Pascal Bary	Niarchos Family	1:04.80
2005	New Girlfriend	Christophe Soumillon	Robert Collet	Richard Strauss	1:04.00
2006	Boccassini	Davy Bonilla	Miroslav Rulec	Stall Nik	1:04.50
2007	Natagora	Christophe Lemaire	Pascal Bary	Stefan Friborg	1:03.20
2008	Lui Rei	Dario Vargiu	Armando Renzoni	Scuderia Siba	1:06.10
2009	Special Duty	Stéphane Pasquier	Criquette Head-Maarek	Khalid Abdullah	1:04.40
2010	Irish Field ^{[b]}	Christophe Soumillon	M. Delcher Sánchez	Sunday Horses Club	1:05.90
2011	Family One	Ioritz Mendizabal	Yann Barberot	Ecurie Ascot	1:07.20
2012	Reckless Abandon	Gérald Mossé	Clive Cox	Deadman / Barrow	1:04.00
2013	Vorda	Grégory Benoist	Philippe Sogorb	Gerard Augustin-Normand	1:05.00
2014	Kool Kompany	Richard Hughes	Richard Hannon Jr.	Middleham Park Racing	1:05.60
2015	Gutaifan	Frankie Dettori	Richard Hannon Jr.	Al Shaqab Racing	1:03.60
2016	Tis Marvellous	Adam Kirby	Clive Cox	Deadman / Barrow	1:03.16
2017	Unfortunately	Tony Piccone	Karl Burke	Laughton / Burke	1:04.50
2018	Signora Cabello	Frankie Dettori	John Quinn	Phoenix / Zen	1:04.34
2019	A'Ali ^{[c]}	Frankie Dettori	Simon Crisford	Duaij Al Khalifa	1:04.38
2020	Ventura Tormenta	Christophe Soumillon	Richard Hannon Jr.	Middleham Park Racing	1:10.85
2021	Atomic Force	Stephane Pasquier	Kevin Ryan	Siu Pak Kwan	1:08.69
2022	Blackbeard	Ioritz Mendizabal	Aidan O'Brien	Derrick Smith, Magnier, Tabor & Westerberg	1:08.31
2023	Ramatuelle	Aurelien Lemaitre	Christopher Head	Infinity Nine Horses, Ecurie Des Monceaux Et Al	1:09.55
2024	Arabie	Jim Crowley	Karl Burke	Mohamed Saeed Al Shahi	1:09.48
2025	Green Sense	Maxime Guyon	Joseph O'Brien	Simon Munir & Isaac Souede	1:11.56
2026	Tokaido	Tony Piccone	Amy Murphy	Anoj Don & Daniel Macauliffe	1:11:87

^{a} The 1977 running took place at Évry.
^{b} The 2010 winner Irish Field was later exported to Hong Kong and renamed Prolific Champion.
^{c} The 2019 running moved to Deauville during unsafely track.

== Earlier winners ==
- 1892: Commandeur
- 1893: Claret
- 1894: Sweet William
- 1895: Nacelle
- 1896: Vidame
- 1897: Cazabat
- 1898: John Wyse
- 1899: Clairette
- 1900: Indian Shore
- 1901: Ophelia
- 1902: Perm
- 1903: Djephte
- 1904: Poppee
- 1905: Prestige
- 1906: Ascalon
- 1907: Sauge Pourpree
- 1908: Fils du Vent
- 1909: Marsa
- 1910: Lord Burgoyne
- 1911: Montrose
- 1912: Gloster
- 1913: Mousse de Mer
- 1914: Clairet
- 1915–18: no race
- 1919: Marron
- 1920: Guerriere
- 1921: Zenoia
- 1922: Pavillon
- 1923: Le Gros Morne
- 1924: Canalette
- 1925: Deauville
- 1926: Green Flor
- 1927: Erica
- 1928: Necklace
- 1929: Chateau Bouscaut
- 1930: Pearl Cap
- 1931: Coeur de Lion
- 1932: Coque de Noix
- 1933: Brantôme
- 1934: Stratosphere
- 1935: Mistress Ford
- 1936: Minaudiere
- 1937: Gossip
- 1938: Bulle de Savon
- 1939: Codor
- 1940: Longthanh
- 1941: Mirko
- 1942: Norseman
- 1943: Ardan
- 1944: Otero
- 1945: Nirgal
- 1946: Chesterfield
- 1947: Primeur
- 1948: Coronation
- 1949: Emperor
- 1950: Pharsale
- 1951: Auriban
- 1952: Pharel
- 1953: Cordova
- 1954: Soya
- 1955: Fiere
- 1956: L'Astrologue
- 1957: Neptune
- 1958: Taboun
- 1959: Sly Pola
- 1960: High Bulk
- 1961: Wakamba
- 1962: Quiqui
- 1963: Djel
- 1964: Double Jump
- 1965: Kashmir
- 1966: Fin Bon
- 1967: Zeddaan
- 1968: Folle Rousse
- 1969: Amber Rama
- 1970: My Swallow
- 1971: Sun Prince
- 1972: Reine du Chant
- 1973: Lianga
- 1974: Sky Commander

== See also ==
- List of French flat horse races
- Recurring sporting events established in 1892 – this race is included under its original title, Omnium de Deux Ans.
