= Chateau Bouscaut (horse) =

French-bred thoroughbred racehorse

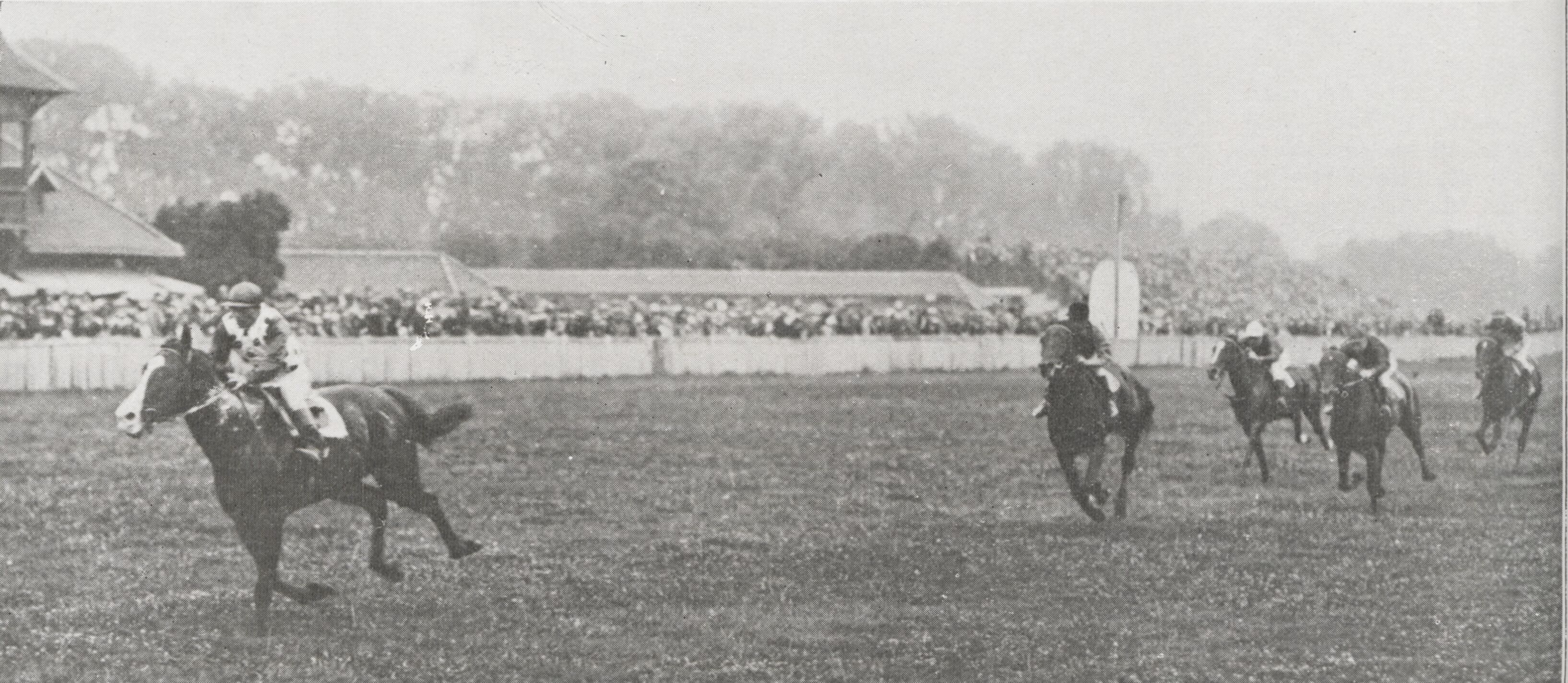
- Chateau Bouscaut won the Prix Robert Papin by four lengths over Bull Dog.
- Sire: Kircubbin
- Grandsire: Captivation
- Dam: Ramondie
- Damsire: Neil Gow
- Sex: Stallion
- Foaled: 1927
- Country: France
- Colour: Bay
- Breeder: Henri Corbière
- Owner: Comte O. de Rivaud
- Record: 10 wins in 18 starts
- Earnings: 1,943,291 FF

Major wins
- Prix Robert Papin (1929); Prix Morny (1929); Prix de la Forêt (1929) Prix du Jockey Club (1930); Prix Noailles (1930); Prix Lagrange (1930) Prix du Cadran (1931); Prix Edgard Gillois (1931)

Awards
- French Champion Two-Year-Old Colt (1929)

Chateau Bouscaut (foaled 1927) was a French-bred thoroughbred racehorse and notable sire.

== Background ==
Chateau Bouscaut was a small bay stallion with a blaze.

Kircubbin, Chateau Bouscaut's sire, had won the Irish St. Leger Stakes and Prix d'Ispahan before retiring to stud in France, where he became a leading sire.

Ramondie, Chateau Bouscaut's dam, also produced Rodosto, winner of the 2000 Guineas, Poule d'Essai des Poulains, and Prix d'Ispahan, among other races.

== Racing career ==
Chateau Bouscaut had an excellent racing career. He won all but one of his starts at two, including the Prix Robert Papin, Prix Morny, and Prix de la Forêt, and was named the French Champion Two-Year-Old Colt. The Grand Criterium was the only race he lost that year.

At three, Chateau Bouscaut won the Prix du Jockey Club and Prix Noailles. He was the leading earner for his sire that year, helping Kircubbin lead the French general sire list.

All told, Chateau Bouscaut won ten of his eighteen starts and finished second or third an additional seven times.

== Stud career ==
Chateau Bouscaut had a successful stud career.

In the Roman-Miller Dosage System, Chateau Bouscaut is considered a Professional Chef-de-race.

=== Notable progeny ===
- Chanteur, winner of the Prix Jean Prat, Prix des Sablons, Prix Edmond Blanc, Prix Hocquart, Prix de Fontainebleau, etc.; Champion Sire in Great Britain in 1953
- The Phoenix, winner of the Irish 2000 Guineas and Irish Derby; notable sire in Ireland
- Gong, winner of the Prix de la Forêt
- Tizona, winner of the Prix Morny
- Furane, winner of the Prix Strathconan, Prix de Martinvast, Prix de la Touques, Prix Morny, etc.
- Longthanh, winner of the Poule d'Essai des Pouliches
- Oubanghi, winner of the Prix Maurepas
- Yngola, winner of the Deutsches St. Leger and Preis der Diana

=== Notable progeny of daughters ===
- Río Pallanga, winner of the Derby Nacional, etc.
- Colonist, winner of the Lowther Stakes and Jockey Club Cup

== Pedigree ==
Pedigree of Chateau Bouscaut (FR), bay stallion, foaled 1927
Sire Kircubbin (GB) 1918	Captivation (GB); 1902	Cyllene (GB)	Bona Vista (GB)
Sire Kircubbin (GB) 1918	Captivation (GB); 1902	Cyllene (GB)	Arcadia (GB)
Sire Kircubbin (GB) 1918	Captivation (GB); 1902	Charm (GB)	St. Simon (GB)
Sire Kircubbin (GB) 1918	Captivation (GB); 1902	Charm (GB)	Tact (GB)
Sire Kircubbin (GB) 1918	Avon Hack (GB); 1907	Hackler (GB)	Petrarch (GB)
Sire Kircubbin (GB) 1918	Avon Hack (GB); 1907	Hackler (GB)	Hackness (GB)
Sire Kircubbin (GB) 1918	Avon Hack (GB); 1907	Avonbeg (GB)	Queen's Birthday (GB)
Sire Kircubbin (GB) 1918	Avon Hack (GB); 1907	Avonbeg (GB)	Avoca (GB)
Dam Ramondie (FR) 1920	Neil Gow (GB); 1907	Marco (GB)	Barcaldine (GB)
Dam Ramondie (FR) 1920	Neil Gow (GB); 1907	Marco (GB)	Notivate (GB)
Dam Ramondie (FR) 1920	Neil Gow (GB); 1907	Chelandry (GB)	Goldfinch (GB)
Dam Ramondie (FR) 1920	Neil Gow (GB); 1907	Chelandry (GB)	Illuminata (GB)
Dam Ramondie (FR) 1920	La Rille (FR); 1908	Macdonald (FR)	Bay Ronald (GB)
Dam Ramondie (FR) 1920	La Rille (FR); 1908	Macdonald (FR)	Myrtledine (GB)
Dam Ramondie (FR) 1920	La Rille (FR); 1908	Recaldia (FR)	Boudoir (FR)
Dam Ramondie (FR) 1920	La Rille (FR); 1908	Recaldia (FR)	Randfontein (FR)
