= Prix Aga Khan IV (Prix d'Ispahan) =

Flat horse race in France

- Class: Group 1
- Location: Longchamp Racecourse; Paris, France
- Inaugurated: 1873
- Race type: Flat / Thoroughbred
- Website: france-galop.com

Race information
- Distance: 1,850 metres (about 9 furlongs or about 1 1/8 miles)
- Surface: Turf
- Track: Right-handed
- Qualification: Four-years-old and up
- Weight: 58 kg Allowances; 1½ kg for fillies and mares
- Purse: €250,000 (2022); 1st: €142,850

Prix d'Ispahan
2026
Daryz	Leffard	Sosie

Previous years
2025
Sosie	Sardinian Warrior	Horizon Dore
2024
Mqse De Sevigne	Horizon Dore	Haya Zark
2023
Anmaat	Light Infantry	Facteur Cheval
2022
Dreamloper	Wally	Pretty Tiger
2021
Skalleti	Tilsit	My Oberon

2020-2011
2020
Persian King	Stormy Antarctic	Pogo
2019
Zabeel Prince	Study Of Man	Trais Fluors
2018
Recoletos	Almodovar	Trais Fluors
2017
Mekhtaal	Robin Of Navan	Usherette
2016
A Shin Hikari	Dariyan	Silverwave
2015
Solow	Gailo Chop	Sparkling Beam
2014
Cirrus Des Aigles	Anodin	Pollyana
2013
Maxios	Planteur	Mandour
2012
Golden Lilac	Planteur	No Risk At All
2011
Goldikova	Cirrus Des Aigles	Rajsaman

2010–2001
2010
Goldikova	Byword	Wiener Walzer
2009
Never On Sunday	Gris De Gris	Runaway
2008
Sageburg	Darjina	Loup Breton
2007
Manduro	Turtle Bowl	Stormy River
2006
Laverock	Manduro	Krataios
2005
Valixir	Elvstroem	Cacique
2004
Prince Kirk	Six Perfections	Checkit
2003
Falbrav	Bright Sky	Carnival Dancer
2002
Best Of The Bests	Poussin	Banks Hill
2001
Observatory	Hightori	Ekraar

2000–1991
2000
Sendawar	Indian Danehill	Chelsea Manor
1999
Croco Rouge	El Condor Pasa	Gold Away
1998
Loup Sauvage	Astarabad	Marathon
1997
Sasuru	Wixim	Simon Du Desert
1996
Halling	Gunboat Diplomacy	Vetheuil
1995
Green Tune	Pelder	Marildo
1994
Bigstone	Muhtarram	Marildo
1993
Arcangues	Misil	Shanghai
1992
Zoman	Arcangues	Exit To Nowhere
1991
Sanglamore	Priolo	Zoman

1990–1988
1990
Creator	Val Des Bois	Citidancer
1989
Indian Skimmer	Gabina	French Stress
1988
Miesque	Saint Andrews	Jalaajel

The Prix Aga Khan IV (Prix d'Ispahan) is a Group 1 flat horse race in France open to thoroughbreds aged four years or older. It is run at Longchamp over a distance of 1,850 metres (about 1 mile and 1¼ furlongs), and it is scheduled to take place each year in May.

== History ==
The inaugural running of the Prix d'Ispahan was the showpiece event of a meeting held at Longchamp on 13 July 1873. The meeting had been hastily arranged to honour the Shah of Persia, Naser al-Din Shah Qajar, who was making an official visit to Paris. The race was named after Ispahan, the French name for Isfahan, a former capital city of Persia.

The Prix d'Ispahan was initially contested over 3,000 metres, and it was originally open to horses aged three or older. Its distance was cut to 2,400 metres in its second year, and it was further reduced to 2,200 metres in 1891, and to 2,100 metres in 1903.

The race was abandoned throughout World War I, with no running from 1915 to 1918. Its present length, 1,850 metres, was introduced in 1921. It was cancelled once during World War II, in 1940. It was run over 2,000 metres at Le Tremblay in 1943 and 1944.

The present system of race grading began in 1971, and the Prix d'Ispahan was classed at the highest level, Group 1. The minimum age of participating horses was raised to four in 1987. It was staged at Chantilly in 1991, and at this venue its distance was 1,800 metres. The race was opened to geldings in 2001.

In 2020, the Prix d'Ispahan was run in July and opened to three years old horses on a one time basis.

In 2026 in honour of the Aga Khan IV, who died in February 2025, the France Galop board of directors renamed the Prix d'Ispahan to the Prix Aga Khan IV (Prix d'Ispahan) for three years, after which the race will be called the Prix Aga Khan IV. The Prix d'Ispahan was chosen to have its name changed to reflect the race's historical link between the Aga Khan dynasty and ancient Persia.

== Records ==
Most successful horse (2 wins):

- Champaubert – 1897, 1898 (dead-heat)
- La Camargo – 1903, 1904
- Moulins la Marche – 1908, 1909
- Renette – 1935, 1936
- Hierocles – 1942, 1943
- Coaraze – 1946, 1947
- Fric – 1955, 1956
- Crystal Glitters – 1983, 1984
- Goldikova – 2010, 2011

Leading jockey (7 wins):

- Yves Saint-Martin – La Sega (1962), Jour et Nuit (1964), Silver Shark (1966), Zeddaan (1968), La Troublerie (1973), Allez France (1974), Crystal Glitters (1983)

Leading trainer (11 wins):

- André Fabre – Al Nasr (1982), Crystal Glitters (1984), Creator (1990), Arcangues (1993), Loup Sauvage (1998), Valixir (2005), Manduro (2007), Golden Lilac (2012), Persian King (2020), Sosie (2025)

Leading owner (8 wins):

- Marcel Boussac – Goyescas (1933), Hierocles (1942, 1943), Priam (1945), Coaraze (1946, 1947), Dynamiter (1951), Arbele (1952)

== Winners since 1969 ==
Year	Winner	Age	Jockey	Trainer	Owner	Time
1969	Grandier	5	Maurice Philipperon	John Cunnington Jr.	Mrs Pierre Ribes	1:55.8
1970	Caro	3	Bill Williamson	Albert Klimscha	Countess Batthyany	1:56.8
1971	Mister Sic Top	4	Alfred Gibert	G. Pézeril	Lucien Deshayes	2:02.4
1972	Riverman	3	Freddy Head	Alec Head	Germaine Wertheimer	1:54.2
1973	La Troublerie	4	Yves Saint-Martin	Gérard Philippeau	Mrs Marc Laloum	1:52.9
1974	Allez France	4	Yves Saint-Martin	Angel Penna Sr.	Daniel Wildenstein	1:55.7
1975	Ramirez	4	Philippe Paquet	François Boutin	María Félix Berger	1:51.3
1976	Full of Hope	6	Bill Pyers	Gilles Delloye	C. F. Delecroix	1:54.4
1977	Lightning	3	Gérard Dubroeucq	François Mathet	Guy de Rothschild	1:52.9
1978	Carwhite	4	Freddy Head	Alec Head	Jacques Wertheimer	1:53.9
1979	Irish River	3	Maurice Philipperon	John Cunnington Jr.	Mrs Raymond Adès	1:51.7
1980	Nadjar	4	Alain Lequeux	Aage Paus	Gunnar Schjelderup	1:57.4
1981	The Wonder	3	Alain Lequeux	Jacques de Chevigny	Mrs Alain du Breil	1:57.7
1982	Al Nasr	4	Alain Lequeux	André Fabre	Moufid F. Dabaghi	1:54.3
1983	Crystal Glitters	3	Yves Saint-Martin	Mitri Saliba	Mahmoud Fustok	1:53.0
1984	Crystal Glitters	4	Alfred Gibert	André Fabre	Mahmoud Fustok	1:50.6
1985	Sagace	5	Éric Legrix	Patrick Biancone	Daniel Wildenstein	1:51.1
1986	Baillamont	4	Freddy Head	François Boutin	Stavros Niarchos	1:50.8
1987	Highest Honor	4	Cash Asmussen	Pascal Bary	Ecurie I. M. Fares	1:55.3
1988	Miesque	4	Freddy Head	François Boutin	Stavros Niarchos	1:55.2
1989	Indian Skimmer	5	Steve Cauthen	Henry Cecil	Sheikh Mohammed	1:52.3
1990	Creator	4	Cash Asmussen	André Fabre	Sheikh Mohammed	1:51.5
1991	Sanglamore	4	Pat Eddery	Roger Charlton	Khalid Abdullah	1:49.9
1992	Zoman	5	Alan Munro	Paul Cole	Prince Fahd bin Salman	1:54.6
1993	Arcangues	5	Thierry Jarnet	André Fabre	Daniel Wildenstein	1:50.7
1994	Bigstone	4	Olivier Peslier	Élie Lellouche	Daniel Wildenstein	1:51.7
1995	Green Tune	4	Olivier Doleuze	Criquette Head	Jacques Wertheimer	1:53.7
1996	Halling	5	Frankie Dettori	Saeed bin Suroor	Godolphin	2:02.9
1997	Sasuru	4	Michael Hills	Geoff Wragg	Anthony Oppenheimer	1:54.6
1998	Loup Sauvage	4	Olivier Peslier	André Fabre	Daniel Wildenstein	1:52.7
1999	Croco Rouge	4	Thierry Jarnet	Pascal Bary	Wafic Saïd	1:53.7
2000	Sendawar	4	Gérald Mossé	Alain de Royer-Dupré	Aga Khan IV	1:59.3
2001	Observatory	4	Richard Hughes	John Gosden	Khalid Abdullah	1:51.0
2002	Best of the Bests	5	Frankie Dettori	Saeed bin Suroor	Godolphin	1:51.4
2003	Falbrav	5	Kieren Fallon	Luca Cumani	Rencati / Yoshida	1:51.0
2004	Prince Kirk	4	Marco Monteriso	Emilio Borromeo	Scuderia Pieffegi	1:52.0
2005	Valixir	4	Christophe Soumillon	André Fabre	Aga Khan IV	1:50.9
2006	Laverock	4	Davy Bonilla	Carlos Laffon-Parias	Gainsborough Stud	1:52.2
2007	Manduro	5	Stéphane Pasquier	André Fabre	Baron G. von Ullmann	1:58.0
2008	Sageburg	4	Olivier Peslier	Alain de Royer-Dupré	Aga Khan IV	1:53.7
2009	Never on Sunday	4	Christophe Lemaire	Jean-Claude Rouget	Daniel-Yves Trèves	1:57.2
2010	Goldikova	5	Olivier Peslier	Freddy Head	Wertheimer et Frère	1:49.4
2011	Goldikova	6	Olivier Peslier	Freddy Head	Wertheimer et Frère	1:51.0
2012	Golden Lilac	4	Maxime Guyon	André Fabre	Gestut Ammerland	1:51.85
2013	Maxios	5	Stéphane Pasquier	Jonathan Pease	Niarchos Family	1:56.55
2014	Cirrus des Aigles	8	Christophe Soumillon	Corine Barande-Barbe	Jean-Claude Dupouy	1:57.98
2015	Solow	5	Maxime Guyon	Freddy Head	Wertheimer et Frère	1:51.30
2016	A Shin Hikari (Note: The 2016 and 2017 races took place at Chantilly while Longchamp was closed for redevelopment)	5	Yutaka Take	Masanori Sakaguchi	Eishindo Co Ltd	1:53.29
2017	Mekhtaal	4	Grégory Benoist	Jean-Claude Rouget	Al Shaqab Racing	1:49.92
2018	Recoletos	4	Olivier Peslier	Carlos Laffon-Parias	Sarl Darpat France	1:52.80
2019	Zabeel Prince	6	Andrea Atzeni	Roger Varian	Mohammed Obaid Al Maktoum	1:53.07
2020 (Note: Due to COVID-19 pandemic, the race moved to mid-July, ran at Chantilly with 1800 metres and open for three-years old horses)	Persian King	4	Pierre-Charles Boudot	André Fabre	Ballymore & Godolphin	1:47.21
2021	Skalleti	6	Gérald Mossé	Jerome Reynier	Jean-Claude Seroul	1:53.57
2022	Dreamloper	5	Kieran Shoemark	Ed Walker	J Fill	1:53.74
2023	Anmaat	5	Jim Crowley	Owen Burrows	Shadwell Estate	1:52.12
2024	Mqse De Sevigne	5	Alexis Pouchin	André Fabre	Baron Édouard de Rothschild	1:54.69
2025	Sosie	4	Maxime Guyon	André Fabre	Wertheimer et Frère	1:51.88
2026	Daryz	4	Mickael Barzalona	Francis-Henri Graffard	Aga Khan Studs Scea	1:54:43

== Earlier winners ==
- 1873: Campeche
- 1874: Franc Tireur
- 1875: Paradoxe
- 1876: Saxifrage
- 1877: Gavarni
- 1878: Jongleur
- 1879: Courtois
- 1880: Castillon
- 1881: Alphonsine
- 1882: Poulet
- 1883: Veston
- 1884: Farfadet
- 1885: Despote
- 1886: Viennois
- 1887: Cambyse
- 1888: Embellie
- 1889: Le Sancy
- 1890: Yellow
- 1891: Amazone
- 1892: Gil Peres
- 1893: Saint Ferjeux
- 1894: Algarade
- 1895: Honneur
- 1896: Le Sagittaire
- 1897: Champaubert
- 1898: Champaubert / Cambridge (Note: The 1898 race was a dead-heat and has joint winners)
- 1899: Fourire
- 1900: Cravan
- 1901: Dido
- 1902: Exema
- 1903: La Camargo
- 1904: La Camargo
- 1905: Caius
- 1906: Phoenix
- 1907: Ouadi Halfa
- 1908: Moulins la Marche
- 1909: Moulins la Marche
- 1910: Goloss
- 1911: Ossian
- 1912: Rouble
- 1913: Foxling
- 1914: Amilcar
- 1915–18: no race
- 1919: Radames
- 1920: Le Rapin
- 1921: La Finette
- 1922: Kircubbin
- 1923: Épinard
- 1924: Premontre
- 1925: Condover
- 1926: Coram
- 1927: Kitty
- 1928: Rialto
- 1929: Kantar
- 1930: Alcyon
- 1931: Four in Hand
- 1932: Lovelace
- 1933: Goyescas
- 1934: Rodosto
- 1935: Renette
- 1936: Renette
- 1937: Sanguinetto
- 1938: Bistolfi
- 1939: Turbulent
- 1940: no race
- 1941: Panipat
- 1942: Hierocles
- 1943: Hierocles
- 1944: Un Gaillard
- 1945: Priam
- 1946: Coaraze
- 1947: Coaraze
- 1948: Bel Amour
- 1949: Menetrier
- 1950: Fort Napoleon
- 1951: Dynamiter
- 1952: Arbele
- 1953: Sadi
- 1954: Florin
- 1955: Fric
- 1956: Fric
- 1957: Chief
- 1958: Blockhaus
- 1959: Hamanet
- 1960: Tobago
- 1961: Javelot
- 1962: La Sega
- 1963: Manderley
- 1964: Jour et Nuit
- 1965: Esso
- 1966: Silver Shark
- 1967: Caldarello
- 1968: Zeddaan

== See also ==
- List of French flat horse races
