= Épinard =

French-bred Thoroughbred racehorse

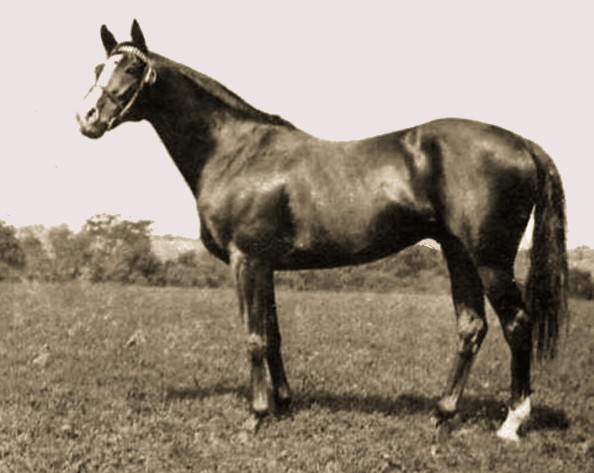
- Sire: Badajoz
- Grandsire: Gost
- Dam: Épine Blanche
- Damsire: Rock Sand
- Sex: Stallion
- Foaled: 1920
- Country: France
- Colour: Chestnut
- Breeder: Pierre Wertheimer
- Owner: Pierre Wertheimer
- Trainer: H. Eugene Leigh
- Record: 20:12-6-0
- Earnings: £1,285 plus 376,975 fr

Major wins
- Prix Yacowlef (1922); Prix des Coteaux (1922); Grand Criterium (1922); Prix de la Forêt (1922); Critérium de Maisons-Laffitte (1922); Prix d'Ispahan (1923); Prix du Gros Chêne (1923); Stewards' Cup (1923)

Awards
- U.S. Champion Older Male Horse (1924)
- Last updated on 28 September 2011

Épinard (1920–1942) was a French Thoroughbred racehorse and sire.

== Background ==
Epinard was a chestnut stallion owned and bred by Pierre Wertheimer.

He sired by Badajoz from Epine Blanche by the British Triple Crown winner Rock Sand. Epine Blanche was conceived in the US and foaled in France. She was out of an American mare named White Thorn by Nasturtium, who was a brilliant two-year-old. Epine Blanche was also the dam of the race winner Epinette III by Mont Bernina. Épinard was inbred to the undefeated racehorse, St. Simon in the third and fourth generation (4m x 4f).

== Racing career ==
Épinard made his racing debut at two by winning the Prix Yacowlef at the Deauville Racecourse. He dominated his age group in France, winning four important races and earning 1922 champion honours. As a three-year-old, he continued to win in France before being sent to compete in England. At the Goodwood Racecourse near Chichester, he won the 1923 Stewards' Cup, defeating a strong field including Pharos. After conceding a great deal of weight, he finished second by a neck to Verdict in the Cambridgeshire Handicap.

In October 1923, Epsom Derby winner Papyrus was sent to the United States to compete in a much-ballyhooed match race against Kentucky Derby winner Zev. After the American horse easily won, the following year the racing world began to talk about Épinard taking on America's best. Following negotiations with leading American horsemen August Belmont Jr., James Shevlin, and Matt Winn, Wertheimer agreed to send Épinard to compete in a series of three American races billed as the International Special.

Épinard arrived at the port of New York on the Cunard Line's luxury liner, the RMS Berengaria. The races were to be held at Belmont Park and Aqueduct Racetrack in New York and at Latonia Race Track in Kentucky; it was the first time Épinard raced on a dirt track. He finished second in all three of the International Specials. Épinard's 1924 performances earned him U.S. Champion Older Male Horse honours, although he lost all four times he ran in America. The fourth race was his last career start, the Laurel Stakes, when he finished fifth to Special #1 winner Wise Counsellor.

== Stud record ==
Retired to stand at stud after his four-year-old season, Épinard had limited success as a sire. In 1926, he was standing in the US, and two years later he returned to France. In 1930, he made another trip to America only to return to France in 1932.

His progeny included Epithet (won Hopeful Stakes), Rentenmark (won Prix Ganay) and Rodosto Épinard was reportedly commandeered during the German occupation of France, and was last seen as a cart horse before he died in 1942.

== Sire line tree ==
- Épinard
  - La Fayette
  - Epithet
  - Hygro
    - Hy Diamond
  - Rodosto
    - Flying Call
    - Raphael
    - Pampre D'Or
    - Dogat
      - Trouville
        - Red Slipper
    - Ashley
  - Rentenmark
  - Good Harvest
  - Emir D'Iran
  - Balthezar
    - Buffalo Bill
  - Boer Bibi
  - Hebecourt
    - Don Japan
  - Fanatique
    - Barbizon
