= Ma Biche =

American-bred Thoroughbred racehorse

- Sire: Key to the Kingdom
- Grandsire: Bold Ruler
- Dam: Madge
- Damsire: Reliance
- Sex: Mare
- Foaled: 23 January 1980
- Country: USA
- Colour: Bay or brown
- Owner: Ghislaine Head; Maktoum Al Maktoum
- Trainer: Criquette Head
- Record: 11:7-0-2

Major wins
- Prix La Flèche (1982); Prix Robert Papin (1982); Cheveley Park Stakes (1982); Prix Imprudence (1982); 1000 Guineas (1983); Prix de la Forêt (1983)

Awards
- Timeform rating: 123 in 1982 and 126 in 1983; Top-rated European two-year-old filly (1982); Timeform top-rated two-year-old filly (1982)

Ma Biche (foaled 1980) was an American-bred, French-trained Thoroughbred racehorse and broodmare who won the classic 1000 Guineas at Newmarket Racecourse in 1983. The filly was the best racehorse of her age and sex in Europe in 1982 when she won two Group One races: the Prix Robert Papin in France and the Cheveley Park Stakes in England. In the following year she defeated a strong field to win the 1000 Guineas, but then suffered from a series of training problems before returning to form in autumn to win the Prix de la Forêt.

== Background ==
Ma Biche was a big, powerful, bay or brown mare, with white socks on her hind legs foaled in Kentucky in January 1980. Her sire Key to the Kingdom was a half brother to Fort Marcy and was a Grade Three winner, taking the Stymie Handicap at Aqueduct Racetrack in 1974. His other progeny included the Breeders' Cup Turf winner Great Communicator. Ma Biche was the first foal of her dam Madge, a daughter of the racemare Midget whose wins included the Coronation Stakes, Queen Elizabeth II Stakes and Prix de la Forêt.

She originally raced in the colours of Ghislaine Head and was trained by Ghislaine's daughter Criquette. She was ridden to her most important successes by Criquette's brother Freddy Head. The filly's name is a French term of endearment meaning literally "My Doe".

== Racing career ==
=== 1982: two-year-old season ===
Ma Biche finished third on her debut in 1982 before winning a race over 1100 metres. At Évry Racecourse she moved up in class and distance to win the Listed Prix La Flèche over 1400 metres, defeating a field which included the subsequent Santa Anita Handicap winner Interco. The filly was then brought back in distance for the Group One Prix Robert Papin at Maisons-Laffitte Racecourse in July. She won from the colt Deep Roots and the British filly Crime of Passion. Deep Roots reversed the form with Ma Biche to win the Prix Morny on firm ground at Deauville Racecourse in August and went on to win the Prix de la Salamandre. On her final appearance of the season, Ma Biche was sent to England to contest the Group One Cheveley Park stakes over six furlongs at Newmarket Racecourse in October. She started the 11/4 favourite and won the race, defeating the British filly Favoridge by three quarters of a length to end the season as the highest-rated filly of her generation in Europe. At the end of the year she was sold for a reported £3 million to Maktoum Al Maktoum.

=== 1983: three-year-old season ===
On her three-year-old debut in early April Ma Biche won the Prix Imprudence on soft ground at Maisons-Laffitte, easily beating Dancing Display at odds of 2/5. Later that month she was sent back to England to contest the 1000 Guineas over the Rowley Mile course for which she was made 5/2 favourite against seventeen other fillies. Ma Biche was retrained in the early stages by Freddy Head before moving up to take the lead inside the final furlong and winning by one and a half lengths from Royal Heroine, Favoridge and Habibti. Royal Heroine was later disqualified for failing a post race drug test but went on to set a North American record for one mile on turf when winning the inaugural Breeders' Cup Mile, whilst Habibti ended the season as Britain's Horse of the Year after a string of outstanding performances over sprint distances. Criquette Head became the first woman to officially train a winner of a British Classic.

Ma Biche had training problems after her win at Newmarket and did not reappear until August at Deauville where she finished unplaced behind Luth Enchantee in the Prix d'Astarte and fourth behind the same filly in the Prix Jacques Le Marois. Ma Biche's last race was the Prix de la Forêt over 1400 metres at Longchamp Racecourse on 23 October. She recorded her fourth Group One win, and her first against colts and older horses as she took the lead in the straight and won by half a length from Pampabird.

== Assessment ==
In 1982, the International Classification, compiled by the official handicappers of Britain, Ireland and France awarded Ma Biche a rating of 81, making her the highest rated two-year-old filly in Europe, six pounds behind the leading colt Diesis. The independent Timeform organisation also named Ma Biche as the best two-year-old filly, with a rating of 123.

In 1983, Ma Biche was rated on 82 in the International Classification, placing her seventh among the European three-year-old fillies. She was given a Timeform rating of 126.

In their book, A Century of Champions, based on the Timeform rating system, John Randall and Tony Morris rated Ma Biche an "average" winner of the 1000 Guineas.

== Stud record ==
Ma Biche was retired from racing to become a broodmare. She was bred to several leading stallions including Alydar, Shadeed, Blushing Groom and Danzig but produced no important winners. The mating with Blushing Groom (FR) resulted in the filly Blushing Pink (USA).

1988 Miss Fyor (USA) : Bay filly, by Danzig (USA) – Unraced

1998 Blodwen (USA) : Bay filly, foaled 2 April, by Mister Baileys (GB) – unplaced all 8 starts in Britain 2001

2002 King Henrik (USA) : Bay colt (gelded), foaled 15 February, by King of Kings (IRE) – placed fourth once from 12 starts on the flat in Britain 2004-6 and unplaced both starts over hurdles in Britain 2006

== Pedigree ==
Pedigree of Ma Biche (USA), bay or brown mare, 1980
Sire Key to the Kingdom (USA) 1970	Bold Ruler (USA); 1954	Nasrullah	Nearco
Sire Key to the Kingdom (USA) 1970	Bold Ruler (USA); 1954	Nasrullah	Mumtaz Begum
Sire Key to the Kingdom (USA) 1970	Bold Ruler (USA); 1954	Miss Disco	Discovery
Sire Key to the Kingdom (USA) 1970	Bold Ruler (USA); 1954	Miss Disco	Outdone
Sire Key to the Kingdom (USA) 1970	Key Bridge (USA); 1959	Princequillo	Prince Rose
Sire Key to the Kingdom (USA) 1970	Key Bridge (USA); 1959	Princequillo	Cosquilla
Sire Key to the Kingdom (USA) 1970	Key Bridge (USA); 1959	Blue Banner	War Admiral
Sire Key to the Kingdom (USA) 1970	Key Bridge (USA); 1959	Blue Banner	Risque Blue
Dam Madge (FR) 1975	Roi Dagobert (FR); 1964	Sicambre	Prince Bio
Dam Madge (FR) 1975	Roi Dagobert (FR); 1964	Sicambre	Sif
Dam Madge (FR) 1975	Roi Dagobert (FR); 1964	Dame d'Atour	Cranach
Dam Madge (FR) 1975	Roi Dagobert (FR); 1964	Dame d'Atour	Barley Corn
Dam Madge (FR) 1975	Midget (FR); 1953	Djebe	Djebel
Dam Madge (FR) 1975	Midget (FR); 1953	Djebe	Catherine
Dam Madge (FR) 1975	Midget (FR); 1953	Mimi	Black Devil
Dam Madge (FR) 1975	Midget (FR); 1953	Mimi	Mignon (Family:1-u)
