= Prix de la Forêt =

Flat horse race in France

- Class: Group 1
- Location: Longchamp Racecourse; Paris, France
- Inaugurated: 1858
- Race type: Flat / Thoroughbred
- Sponsor: Qatar
- Website: france-galop.com

Race information
- Distance: 1,400 metres (7f)
- Surface: Turf
- Track: Right-handed
- Qualification: Three-years-old and up
- Weight: 57 kg (3yo); 58 kg (4yo+); Allowances; 1½ kg for fillies and mares
- Purse: €350,000 (2021); 1st: €199,990

Prix de la Forêt
2026
True Love	Nighttime	Puerto Rico

Previous years
2025
Maranoa Charlie	Zarigana	Ten Bob Tony
2024
Ramatuelle	Kinross	Beauvatier
2023
Kelina	Kinross	Shouldvebeenaring
2022
Kinross	Malavath	Entscheiden
2021
Space Blues	Pearls Galore	Entscheiden

2020-2011
2020
One Master	Earthlight	Safe Voyage
2019
One Master	City Light	Speak In Colours
2018
One Master	Inns Of Court	Dutch Connection
2017
Aclaim	So Beloved	Karar
2016
Limato	Karar	Suedois
2015
Make Believe	Limato	Toormore
2014
Olympic Glory	Gordon Lord Byron	Noozhoh Canarias
2013
Moonlight Cloud	Gordon Lord Byron	Garswood
2012
Gordon Lord Byron	Penitent	Kendam
2011
Dream Ahead	Goldikova	Surfrider

2010–2001
2010
Goldikova	Paco Boy	Dick Turpin
2009
Varenar	Sweet Hearth	Goldikova
2008
Paco Boy	Natagora	Us Ranger
2007
Toylsome	Welsh Emperor	Marchand D'or
2006
Caradak	Linngari	Welsh Emperor
2005
Court Masterpiece	Caradak	Mirabilis
2004
Somnus	Denebola	Le Vie Dei Colori
2003
Etoile Montante	Royal Millennium	Saratan
2002
Dedication	Medecis	Cayoke
2001
Mount Abu	China Visit	Warningford

2000–1991
2000
Indian Lodge	Dansili	Sugarfoot
1999
Field Of Hope	Keos	Trans Island
1998
Tomba	Charge D'Affaires	Keos
1997
Occupandiste	Gothenberg	Tomba
1996
A Magicman	Miesque's Son	Shaanxi
1995
Poplar Bluff	Bin Ajwaad	Inzar
1994
Bigstone	Missed Flight	Neverneyev
1993
Dolphin Street	Ski Paradise	Tinners Way
1992
Wolfhound	Silicon Bavaria	Kenbu
1991
Danseuse Du Soir	Itsabrahma	Osario

1990–1983
1990
Septieme Ciel	Norwich	Philippi
1989
Gabina	Royal Touch	Aliocha
1988
Salse	Gabina	Big Shuffle
1987
Soviet Star	Highest Honor	Turkish Ruler
1986
Sarab	Risk Me	Whakilyric
1985
Brocade	Nikos	Breath Taking
1984
Procida	Nikos	Rousillon
1983
Ma Biche	Pampabird	Aragon

The Prix de la Forêt is a Group 1 flat horse race in France open to thoroughbreds aged three years or older. It is run at Longchamp over a distance of 1,400 metres (about 7 furlongs), and it is scheduled to take place each year in early October.

== History ==
The event was originally held at Chantilly, and it is named after Chantilly Forest. It was established in 1858, and was initially a 2,100-metre race for two or three-year-old colts and fillies. It took place in late October.

The Prix de la Forêt was not run in 1870, because of the Franco-Prussian War. It was cut to 1,600 metres and opened to older horses in 1878. It was cancelled again in 1906, and transferred to Longchamp in 1907.

The race was abandoned throughout World War I, with no running from 1914 to 1918. It was shortened to 1,400 metres in 1923. It was cancelled once during World War II, in 1939. It was staged at Auteuil in 1940, and Le Tremblay in 1943 and 1944.

The event was closed to two-year-olds in 1995, and opened to geldings in 2001. It was moved to the Saturday of Prix de l'Arc de Triomphe weekend in 2005. It was switched to the same day as the "Arc", the first Sunday in October, in 2010.

The Prix de la Forêt was added to the Breeders' Cup Challenge series in 2012. The winner now earns an automatic invitation to compete in the same year's Breeders' Cup Mile.

== Records ==
Most successful horse (3 wins):

- One Master – 2018, 2019, 2020

Leading jockey (5 wins):

- Alfred Carratt – Normandie (1866), Mathilde (1871), Premier Mai (1874), Phenix (1878), Barberine (1885)
- Alain Lequeux – Mirna (1963), Sanedtki (1977, 1978), Producer (1979), Procida (1984)
- Freddy Head – Barbare (1966), Regent Street (1968), Lyphard (1972), Ma Biche (1983), Septieme Ciel (1990)
- Olivier Peslier - Bigstone (1994), Poplar Bluff (1995), Etoile Montante (2003), Goldikova (2010), Make Believe (2015)

Leading trainer (8 wins):

- Henry Jennings – Wedding (1859), Finlande (1860), Normandie (1866), Mathilde (1871), Christiania (1872), Barcarolle (1873), Premier Mai (1874), Peronne (1881)

Leading owner (9 wins):

- Marcel Boussac – Durzetta (1920), Zariba (1921), La Moqueuse (1928), Esmeralda (1941), Caravelle (1943, 1944), Goyama (1945), Pharsale (1950), Pharaos (1951)

== Winners since 1970 ==
Year	Winner	Age	Jockey	Trainer	Owner	Time
1970	Stratege	2	Maurice Philipperon	Richard Carver Jr.	Jean Ternynck	1:23.00
1971	Faraway Son	4	Yves Saint-Martin	Maurice Zilber	Daniel Wildenstein	1:21.70
1972	Lyphard	3	Freddy Head	Alec Head	Germaine Wertheimer	1:23.70
1973	African Sky	3	Yves Saint-Martin	Albert Klimscha	Daniel Wildenstein	1:23.60
1974	Northern Taste	3	Jean-Claude Desaint	John Cunnington Sr.	Zenya Yoshida	1:29.00
1975	Roan Star	2	Willie Carson	Roger Poincelet	Mrs H. Lazar	1:24.10
1976	Pharly	2	Maurice Philipperon	John Cunnington Jr.	Antonio Blasco	1:26.00
1977	Sanedtki	3	Alain Lequeux	Olivier Douieb	B. Zimmerman	1:25.40
1978	Sanedtki	4	Alain Lequeux	Olivier Douieb	Serge Fradkoff	1:22.50
1979	Producer	3	Alain Lequeux	Maurice Zilber	Roy Gottlieb	1:24.30
1980	Moorestyle	3	Lester Piggott	Robert Armstrong	Moores Furnishings Ltd	1:25.80
1981	Moorestyle	4	Lester Piggott	Robert Armstrong	Moores Furnishings Ltd	1:30.40
1982	Pas de Seul	3	Christy Roche	David O'Brien	Robert Sangster	1:27.70
1983	Ma Biche	3	Freddy Head	Criquette Head	Maktoum Al Maktoum	1:22.60
1984	Procida	3	Alain Lequeux	François Boutin	Stavros Niarchos	1:27.70
1985	Brocade	4	Pat Eddery	Guy Harwood	Gerald Leigh	1:21.60
1986	Sarab	5	Richard Quinn	Paul Cole	Fahd Salman	1:23.30
1987	Soviet Star	3	Greville Starkey	André Fabre	Sheikh Mohammed	1:25.80
1988	Salse	3	Willie Carson	Henry Cecil	Sheikh Mohammed	1:24.00
1989	Gabina	4	Éric Legrix	J. C. Cunnington	Jürgen Schiefelbein	1:21.00
1990	Septieme Ciel	3	Freddy Head	Criquette Head	Johnny Jones	1:19.40
1991	Danseuse du Soir	3	Dominique Boeuf	Élie Lellouche	Daniel Wildenstein	1:22.80
1992	Wolfhound	3	Pat Eddery	John Gosden	Sheikh Mohammed	1:24.80
1993	Dolphin Street	3	Cash Asmussen	John Hammond	Stavros Niarchos	1:26.90
1994	Bigstone	4	Olivier Peslier	Élie Lellouche	Daniel Wildenstein	1:21.20
1995	Poplar Bluff	3	Olivier Peslier	André Fabre	Daniel Wildenstein	1:18.40
1996	A Magicman	4	Andreas Suborics	Hartmut Steguweit	Stall Dagobert	1:22.80
1997	Occupandiste	4	Olivier Doleuze	Criquette Head	Wertheimer et Frère	1:21.40
1998	Tomba	4	Kieren Fallon	Brian J. Meehan	John Good	1:27.10
1999	Field of Hope	4	Sylvain Guillot	Pascal Bary	Grundy Bloodstock Ltd	1:20.80
2000	Indian Lodge	4	Pat Eddery	Amanda Perrett	Cohn / Parker	1:22.30
2001	Mount Abu	4	Jimmy Fortune	John Gosden	Seidler / Smith	1:22.90
2002	Dedication	3	Olivier Doleuze	Criquette Head-Maarek	Ghislaine Head	1:18.70
2003	Étoile Montante	3	Olivier Peslier	Criquette Head-Maarek	Khalid Abdullah	1:22.60
2004	Somnus	4	Michael Kinane	Tim Easterby	Legard / Sidebottom / Sykes	1:22.30
2005	Court Masterpiece	5	Gérald Mossé	Ed Dunlop	Maktoum Al Maktoum	1:22.20
2006	Caradak	5	Frankie Dettori	Saeed bin Suroor	Godolphin	1:20.90
2007	Toylsome	8	Stéphane Pasquier	Jens Hirschberger	Georg von Ullmann	1:22.50
2008	Paco Boy	3	Christophe Soumillon	Richard Hannon Sr.	Calvera Partnership 2	1:19.80
2009	Varenar	3	Stéphane Pasquier	Alain de Royer-Dupré	HH Aga Khan IV	1:19.20
2010	Goldikova	5	Olivier Peslier	Freddy Head	Wertheimer et Frère	1:22.10
2011	Dream Ahead	3	William Buick	David Simcock	Khalifa Dasmal	1:18.10
2012	Gordon Lord Byron	4	William Buick	Tom Hogan	Cahalan / Schneider	1:25.17
2013	Moonlight Cloud	5	Thierry Jarnet	Freddie Head	George Strawbridge	1:21.08
2014	Olympic Glory	4	Frankie Dettori	Richard Hannon Jr.	Al Shaqab Racing	1:17.73
2015	Make Believe	4	Olivier Peslier	André Fabre	Prince A. A. Faisal	1:17.05
2016	Limato (Note: The 2016 and 2017 runnings took place at Chantilly while Longchamp was closed for redevelopment.)	4	Harry Bentley	Henry Candy	Paul G Jacobs	1:21.83
2017	Aclaim	4	Oisin Murphy	Martyn Meade	Canning Downs & Partner	1:25.75
2018	One Master	4	Pierre-Charles Boudot	William Haggas	Lael Stable	1:20.29
2019	One Master	5	Pierre-Charles Boudot	William Haggas	Lael Stable	1:23.66
2020	One Master	6	Pierre-Charles Boudot	William Haggas	Lael Stable	1:24.75
2021	Space Blues	5	William Buick	Charlie Appleby	Godolphin	1:22.97
2022	Kinross	5	Frankie Dettori	Ralph Beckett	Marc Chan	1:24.40
2023	Kelina	3	Maxime Guyon	Carlos Laffon-Parias	Wertheimer et Frère	1:17.17
2024	Ramatuelle	3	Aurelien Lemaitre	Christopher Head	Infinity Nine Horses, Ecurie Des Monceaux Et Al	1:20.02
2025	Maranoa Charlie	3	Aurelien Lemaitre	Christopher Head	Bond Thoroughbred Limited	1:20.80
2026	True Love	3	Ryan Moore	Aidan O'Brien	Tabor / Smith / Magnier	1:18.75

== Earlier winners ==
- 1858: Union Jack
- 1859: Wedding
- 1860: Finlande
- 1861: Bravoure
- 1862:
- 1863: Eva
- 1864: Tourmalet
- 1865: Salambo
- 1866: Normandie
- 1867: Nemea
- 1868: Pompier
- 1869: Monseigneur
- 1870: no race
- 1871: Mathilde
- 1872: Christiania
- 1873: Barcarolle
- 1874: Premier Mai
- 1875: Bibletto
- 1876: Kilt
- 1877: Astree
- 1878: Phenix
- 1879: Seymour
- 1880: Castillon
- 1881: Peronne
- 1882: Veston
- 1883: Azur
- 1884: Azur
- 1885: Barberine
- 1886: Fricandeau
- 1887: Acheron
- 1888: Catharina
- 1889: Alicante
- 1890: Chalet
- 1891: Le Nord
- 1892: Fra Angelico
- 1893: Dolma Baghtche
- 1894: Omnium II
- 1895: Hero
- 1896: Castelnau
- 1897: Royal Mint
- 1898: Herse
- 1899: Semendria
- 1900: La Camargo
- 1901: Limousin
- 1902: Mireille
- 1903: Lorlot
- 1904: Adam
- 1905: Prestige
- 1906: no race
- 1907: Valda
- 1908: Princess Margaret
- 1909: Moulins la Marche
- 1910: Ronde de Nuit
- 1911: Montrose / Petulance (Note: The 1911 and 1932 races were dead-heats and have joint winners.)
- 1912: Blarney
- 1913: Le Grand Pressigny
- 1914–18: no race
- 1919: Cid Campeador
- 1920: Durzetta
- 1921: Zariba
- 1922: Épinard
- 1923: Scaramouche
- 1924: Niceas
- 1925: Brumaire
- 1926: Licteur
- 1927: Coram
- 1928: La Moqueuse
- 1929: Chateau Bouscaut
- 1930: Baoule
- 1931: Four in Hand
- 1932: Assuerus / Lovelace
- 1933: Jocrisse
- 1934: Jus de Raisin
- 1935: Gong
- 1936: Mousson
- 1937: Blue Star
- 1938: Dixiana
- 1939: no race
- 1940: Corviglia
- 1941: Esmeralda
- 1942: Buena Vista
- 1943: Caravelle
- 1944: Caravelle
- 1945: Goyama
- 1946: Vagabond
- 1947: Menetrier
- 1948: Fontenay
- 1949: Tantieme
- 1950: Pharsale
- 1951: Pharaos
- 1952: Guersant
- 1953: Fine Top
- 1954: Fine Top
- 1955: Vareta
- 1956: Midget
- 1957: Oferista
- 1958: Currito
- 1959: Hautain
- 1960: Mincio
- 1961: Snob
- 1962: Spy Well
- 1963: Mirna
- 1964: Kirkland Lake
- 1965: Red Slipper
- 1966: Barbare
- 1967: Cabhurst
- 1968: Regent Street
- 1969: Democratie

== See also ==
- List of French flat horse races
