= Robert Collet =

French thoroughbred racehorse trainer (born 1948)

Personal information
- Born: 6 May 1948 (age 78) Les Essarts le Roi, 78 Yvelines, France
- Occupation: Trainer

Horse racing career
- Sport: Horse racing
- Career wins: 1900+ (ongoing)

Major racing wins
- European steeplechase wins: Prix Ferdinand Dufaure (1981, 1982) European flat race wins: Grand Prix de Deauville (1979); Poule d'Essai des Pouliches (1981); Prix Eugène Adam (1982); Prix d'Harcourt (1983, 1992); Prix Jean Prat (1983); Prix Jean de Chaudenay (1983); Prix Dollar (1983); Prix Greffulhe (1983); Prix de Pomone (1984, 1987); Prix de la Salamandre (1984); Prix d'Arenberg (1985, 2005, 2006); Poule d'Essai des Poulains (1985); Nunthorpe Stakes (1986); King's Stand Stakes (1986); Prix de Saint-Georges (1986, 1991, 1994, 1998); Bavarian Classic (1987); Deutschland-Preis (1987); Frühjahrs Dreijährigen-Preis (1987, 1988); Fürstenberg-Rennen (1989); Prix Maurice de Nieuil (1987); Prix du Gros Chêne (1982, 1986, 1998, 1999, 2007); Prix de Sandringham (1991); Prix Saint Alary (1999); Prix Robert Papin (2001, 2005); Prix Morny (2003); Critérium de Maisons-Laffitte (2003, 2004); Prix Jacques Le Marois (2004); Prix Maurice de Gheest (2005); Prix Yacowlef (2005, 2006); Coronation Stakes (2011) British Classic Race wins: St. Leger Stakes (1979) International race wins: Breeders' Cup Mile (1986); Rothman's International (1987); Japan Cup (1987); Washington, D.C. International (1987) E. P. Taylor Stakes (1994, 2001)

Significant horses
- Last Tycoon, Le Glorieux, Megahertz, Son of Love, River Memories, Whipper

Robert Collet (born 6 May 1948 in Chantilly, Oise) is a French thoroughbred racehorse trainer. Robert Collet was one of the first European trainers to win a Breeders' Cup race when he won the 1986 edition of the Breeders' Cup Mile at Hollywood Park Racetrack with Last Tycoon. In 1987, Collet achieved the extraordinary feat of winning three Group one races on three different continents with the same horse when Le Glorieux captured the Deutschland-Preis in Europe, the Washington, D.C. International in North America and the Japan Cup in Asia.

Robert Collet's son Rodolphe "Rod" Collet, is also a successful racehorse trainer.
