= Criquette Head-Maarek =

French racehorse trainer

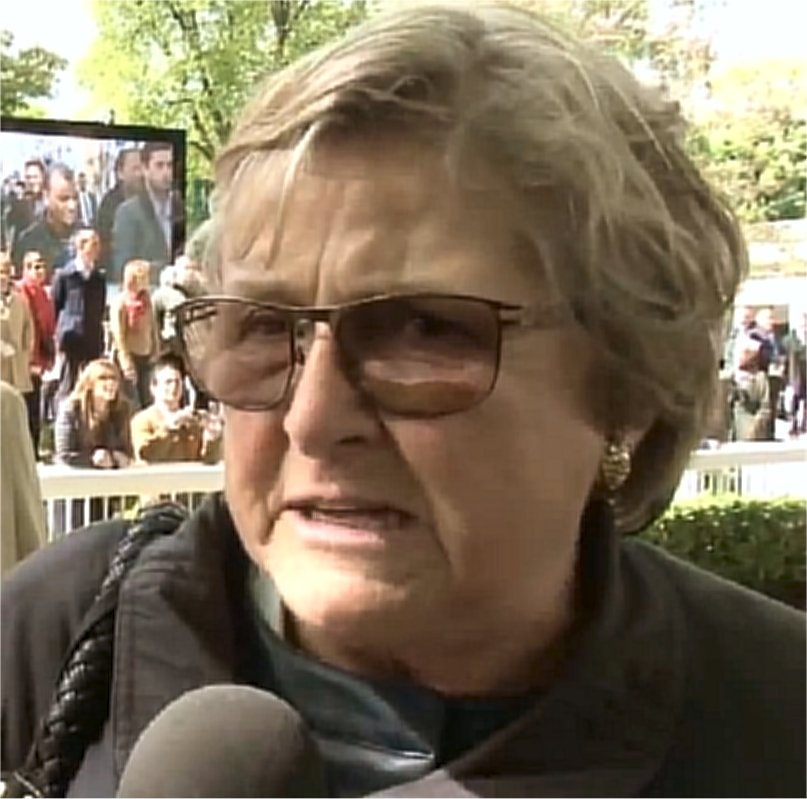
- Criquette Head in April 2014

Personal information
- Born: 6 November 1948 (age 77) Marly-le-Roi
- Occupation: Trainer

Horse racing career
- Sport: Horse racing

Major racing wins
- British Classic Race wins: 1000 Guineas (1983, 1988, 1992, 2010); French Classic Race wins: Poule d'Essai des Pouliches (1979, 1985, 1986, 1988, 1994, 1995, 1997); Prix de Diane (1982, 2000, 2013); Prix Royal-Oak (1984); Prix du Jockey Club (1986); Poule d'Essai des Poulains (2004); Other Major Wins: Prix de l'Arc de Triomphe (1979, 2013, 2014); Deutschland-Preis (1981); E. P. Taylor Stakes (1984, 1985, 1992); Beverly D. Stakes (1994)

Significant horses
- Ma Biche, Ravinella, Hatoof, Special Duty, Treve, Anabaa, African Rose, Three Troikas, American Post, Bering

Christiane "Criquette" Head (born 6 November 1948 at Marly-le-Roi, near Maisons-Laffitte, France) is a retired French racehorse trainer. Known as Criquette, she was born into the Thoroughbred horse racing business. Her great-grandfather was a jockey-turned-trainer as was her grandfather William Head who was a very successful jockey, trainer, and owner in both flat racing and steeplechase events. Her father, Alec Head, became a successful trainer and breeder and the owner of Haras du Quesnay thoroughbred breeding farm near Deauville. The eldest of three daughters, her brother Freddy Head has been the champion jockey six times in France who later became a horse trainer, and sister Martine oversaw the operations at Haras du Quesnay until its closure in November 2022.

== Background ==
In her teens, Criquette Head studied for three years in the United Kingdom at schools in Guildford in Surrey and Eastbourne in East Sussex. She started riding ponies as a child then at age 18 began competing as a rider. Trilingual (French, English and Spanish), she lived in Spain for several years before returning home in 1974 where she worked in a brokerage firm but decided on a career in racing.

== Training career ==
She began as an assistant trainer for her father and in 1978 obtained her training license. The following year the Prix de l'Arc de Triomphe became a true "Head" family affair. Winner Three Troikas was owned by her mother Ghislaine Head, was ridden by Freddy Head, and trained by Criquette. Her victory in the most prestigious French horse race was the first ever by a female trainer.

The Head family has had a long association in horse racing with the Wertheimer family, proprietors of the House of Chanel perfume company and owners of successful racing stables. Alec Head trained horses for both Pierre Wertheimer (1887–1965) and his son Jacques (1909–1996). In 1983, Criquette Head took over as Jacques Wertheimer's trainer. In 1986 she was the champion trainer in France. She continued to have great success with Wertheimer and his sons Alain and Gérard until they ended their working relationship in August 2006 following a disagreement over the owners' retained jockey, Olivier Peslier.

Criquette Head lived and trained in Chantilly and is president of the French Trainers' Association. A registered bloodstock agent since 1976, she trains for other notable stable owners such as Prince Khalid Abdullah, John T. L. Jones, Jr. and until his death in 2006 Maktoum bin Rashid Al Maktoum.

== Personal life ==
Head-Maarek married journalist Gilles Maarek in 2000. She announced her retirement in February 2018.

== Major wins ==
Partial list of races won by horses trained by Criquette Head :

France:

- Critérium de Saint-Cloud (1994, 1997, 2007, 2014)
- Critérium de Maisons-Laffitte (1984, 1987, 1989, 1997, 1998)
- Grand Prix de Chantilly (1996, 2001)
- Grand Prix de Saint-Cloud (2015)
- La Coupe (1987, 1988, 1989)
- La Coupe de Maisons-Laffitte (1986, 1990, 1993)
- Poule d'Essai des Poulains (2004)
- Poule d'Essai des Pouliches (1979, 1985, 1986, 1988, 1994, 1995, 1997)
- Prix de l'Abbaye de Longchamp (1996)
- Prix de l'Arc de Triomphe (1979, 2013, 2014)
- Prix d'Arenberg (1978, 1983, 1987, 1990, 1993, 1994, 1996, 2000, 2003)
- Prix du Calvados (1982, 1995)
- Prix de Diane (1982, 2000, 2013)
- Prix Eclipse (1984, 1987, 1999)
- Prix de la Forêt (1983, 1990, 1997, 2002, 2003)
- Prix d'Ispahan (1995)
- Prix du Jockey Club (1986)
- Prix Jean-Luc Lagardère (1982, 2000, 2003, 2014, 2016)
- Prix Jean Prat (1991, 1996, 2002)
- Prix Marcel Boussac (1992, 1994, 1997, 1998, 2008)
- Prix Maurice de Gheest (1988, 1996, 1997)
- Prix Miesque (2003, 2005, 2006)
- Prix Noailles (1981, 1986, 1998)
- Prix de l'Opéra (1984, 1987, 1988, 1989, 1992)
- Prix Robert Papin (1982, 1985, 1987, 1992, 1993, 2009)
- Prix Royal-Oak (1984)
- Prix Saint-Alary (1979, 1982, 1985, 1988, 1991, 2003)
- Prix de la Salamandre (1982, 1985)
- Prix Vermeille (1979, 2013, 2015)

Canada:

- E. P. Taylor Stakes (1984, 1985, 1992)

Germany:

- Deutschland-Preis (1981)

Great Britain:

- 1000 Guineas (1983, 1988, 1992, 2010)
- Champion Stakes (1993)
- Cheveley Park Stakes (1982, 1987, 1996, 2009)
- Coronation Stakes (1993)
- Falmouth Stakes (1996)
- July Cup (1996)
- Racing Post Trophy (2003)
- Sprint Cup (2008)

Singapore:

- Krisflyer Sprint (2001)

United States:

- Beverly D. Stakes (1994)
