= Philippe Paquet (jockey) =

French jockey

Philippe Paquet is a former champion jockey from France, who in 1974 was the winner of the Prix du Jockey Club on Caracolero, and the Gran Premio d'Italia on Ribecourt. In 1976, he also won the Irish Derby on Malacate, and the Irish Oaks on Lagunette. In 1979 and 1980, he won back to back on Boiteon in Prix Maurice de Gheest. In 1981, he won his final Group one on April Run in Prix Vermeille before finishing a close third in the Arc.

He was the stable jockey of famous French trainer François Boutin for nine years. He joined Boutin straight from school as a 14-year-old apprentice in 1966, via the local employment exchange. He was on board Nonoalco when the colt made a winning debut in the Prix Yacowlef at Deauville in 1973, breaking the course record in the process He was made stable jockey to Boutin that season, although Piggott and Saint-Martin were still used when available. In 1980, he finished the 2,000 Guineas in first place on the Boutin-trained Nureyev, but was later disqualified for impeding the progress of Posse, ridden by Pat Eddery.

In 1977, when his 17 Group winners included Trepan, Super Concorde and Malacate, Paquet won the Cravache d’Or (Golden Whip) as French Champion Jockey, which he won again in 1979, the year in which he also won the Champion Stakes on Northern Baby, on whom he had finished third in The Derby at Epsom.

At the end of 1981 he went to Hong Kong and became the stable jockey of 1966 Epsom Derby winning trainer Gordon Symth and English trainer Derek Kent, and then Australian trainer George Moore, his father-in-law at the time. On 22 January 1984 he won the Hong Kong Derby on Baby Tiger, adding yet another prestigious trophy.

His career came to an abrupt end while training on Silver Star during a morning training session just weeks later on 13 February 1984, when he was thrown onto the turf by his mount and sustained a serious skull fracture. He received mouth to mouth resuscitation from racing journalist Graham Rock. He remained in a coma for more than three months, before regaining consciousness. Initially left partially paralysed, he spent time at a rehabilitation centre in Queensland before returning to France. Against all odds and predictions by medical staff he gradually regained mobility, speech and memory.

On an even more tragic note, Englishman Brian Taylor would die from the head and neck injuries suffered in a similar fall on the same horse, Silver Star, on 8 December that year.

Paquet, once paralysed due to the injuries, made a remarkable recovery, and even made a return to horseback, although for leisure only. Working as an assistant trainer to Francois Boutin, he later took out a training licence in his own right and enjoyed success with L'Avocat in 2004, 2005 and 2006, Outlay, Water Dragon, Zarika, Hunaudieres and Zigarolo being among his other winners.

In 2005 Jim McGrath reported in the Daily Telegraph how one morning, having waited for his work rider to appear, in frustration Paquet decided to ride work himself. "After I had done one circuit I went to pull my horse up, but I found I couldn't. After another circuit, I aimed him at a big hedge. The next thing I remember was lying on the ground, and somebody standing over me, telling me my horse was on the other side of the hedge, lying dead. Thank God, I was able to get up, and my horse was just winded."
