= Sylvain Guillot =

French jockey

Sylvain Guillot (born 1972) is a French jockey. He is married to the sister of fellow jockey Yannick Fouin and has one son, Thomas.

For three years from about 1987, Guillot did an apprenticeship with Jean-François Daubin at Maisons-Laffitte. In 1990, he joined Jean-Paul Gallorini's stable and won 15 races on the flat and eight over the jumps.

Guillot's greatest successes came in 1994 when he won the Grand Critérium at Longchamp on Goldmark and, just two weeks later, the Champion Stakes at Newmarket, riding Dernier Empereur.

In 1995, he won the Prix Jacques Le Marois while riding Miss Satamixa, the Grosser Preis der Badischen Wirtschaft on Freedom Cry, and the Oaks d'Italia on Valley of Gold.

In September 2006, he broke his wrist whilst practicing, though he has returned to horse riding since.

== Major wins ==
France

- Grand Critérium - (1) - Goldmark (1994)
- Grand Prix de Paris - (1) - Fort Wood (1993)
- Prix d'Astarté - (2) - Ski Paradise (1993), Field of Hope (1999)
- Prix de la Forêt - (1) - Field of Hope (1999)
- Prix Jacques Le Marois - (1) - Miss Satamixa (1995)
- Prix Lupin - (1) - Croco Rouge (1998)
- Prix Saint-Alary - (1) - Cerulean Sky (1999)

Germany

- Preis von Europa - (2) - Taipan (1997, 1998)

(United Kingdom) Great Britain

- Champion Stakes - (1) - Dernier Empereur (1994)

Italy

- Oaks d'Italia - (1) - Valley of Gold (1995)
