= Thierry Thulliez =

French jockey

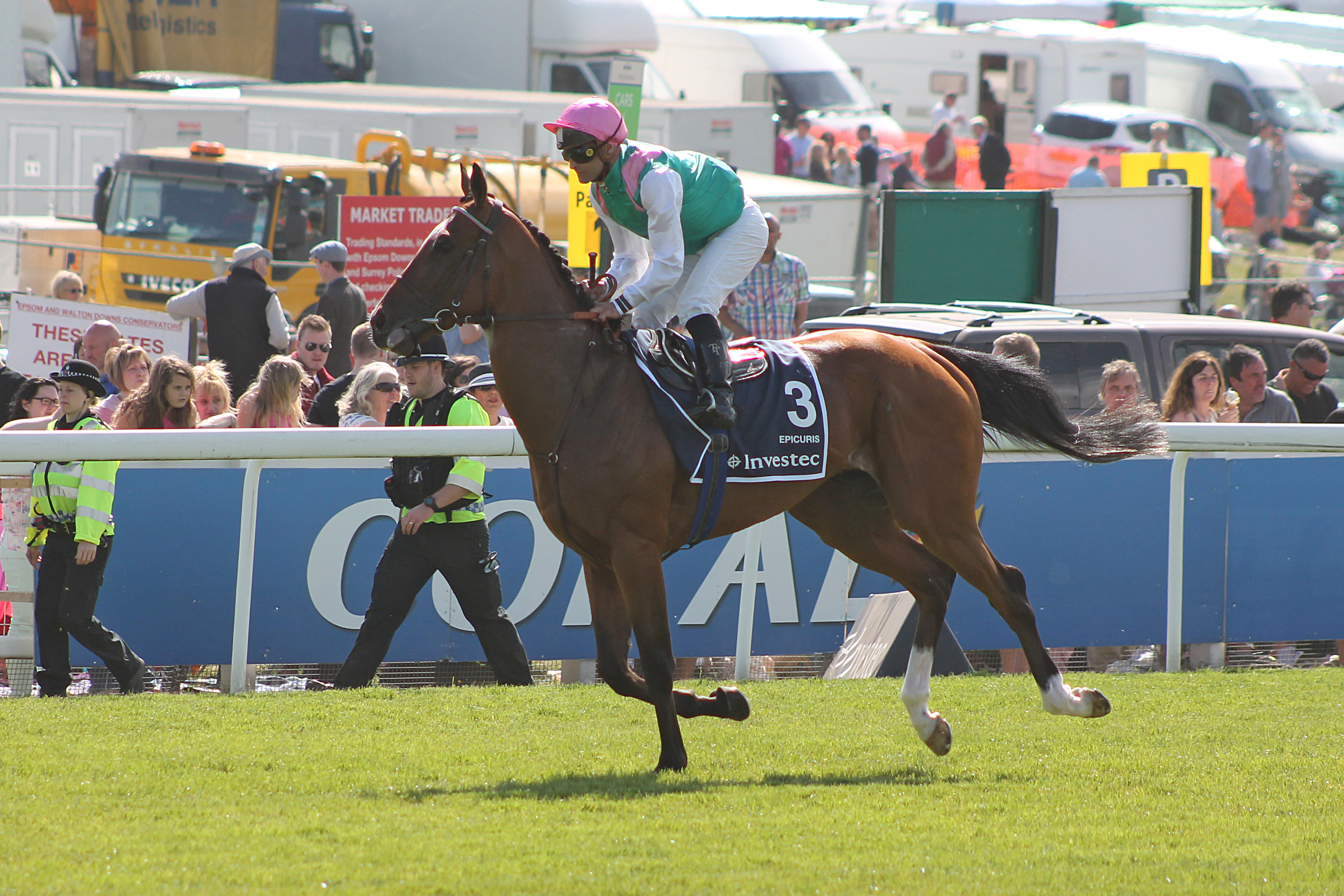
Epsom Derby 2015 - Epicuris and Thierry Thulliez going to post

Thierry Thulliez (born 4 August 1974) is a French jockey.

== Major wins ==
France

- Critérium de Saint-Cloud - (1) - Epicuris (2014)
- Critérium International - French Fifteen (2011)
- Poule d'Essai des Poulains - Style Vendome (2013)
- Prix d'Astarté - (1) - Darjina (2007)
- Prix de Diane - (1) - Carling (1995)
- Prix du Cadran - (1) - Mille Et Mille (2015)
- Prix Jacques Le Marois - (1) - Six Perfections (2003)
- Prix Jean Prat - (1) - Stormy River (2006)
- Prix du Jockey Club - (2) - Sulamani (2002), Blue Canari (2004)
- Prix Jean-Luc Lagardère - (1) - Full Mast (2014)
- Prix Marcel Boussac - (1) - Six Perfections (2002)
- Prix de l'Opéra - (1) - Satwa Queen (2007)
- Prix Vermeille - (1) - Carling (1995)

Italy

- Premio Roma - (1) - Feuerblitz (2013)

United States

- Breeders' Cup Mile - (1) - Domedriver (2002)
