= 1999 Prix de l'Arc de Triomphe =

- Location: Longchamp Racecourse
- Date: October 3, 1999
- Winning horse: Montjeu

The 1999 Prix de l'Arc de Triomphe was a horse race held at Longchamp on Sunday 3 October 1999. It was the 78th running of the Prix de l'Arc de Triomphe.

The winner was Montjeu, a three-year-old colt trained in France by John Hammond. The winning jockey was Michael Kinane.

== Race details ==
- Sponsor: Groupe Lucien Barrière
- Purse: 7,000,000 F; First prize: 4,000,000 F
- Going: Heavy
- Distance: 2,400 metres
- Number of runners: 14
- Winner's time: 2m 38.5s

== Full result ==
Pos.	Marg.	Horse	Age	Jockey	Trainer (Country)
1		Montjeu	3	Michael Kinane	John Hammond (FR)
2	½	El Condor Pasa	4	Masayoshi Ebina	Yoshitaka Ninomiya (JPN)
3	6	Croco Rouge	4	Thierry Jarnet	Pascal Bary (FR)
4	5	Leggera	4	Richard Quinn	John Dunlop (GB)
5	¾	Tiger Hill	4	Terence Hellier	Peter Schiergen (GER)
6	nk	Greek Dance	4	Kieren Fallon	Sir Michael Stoute (GB)
7	2	Borgia	5	Olivier Peslier	André Fabre (FR)
8	4	Cerulean Sky	3	Sylvain Guillot	Robert Collet (FR)
9	5	Daylami	5	Frankie Dettori	Saeed bin Suroor (GB)
10	3	Flamingo Road	3	Andrasch Starke	Andreas Schütz (GER)
11	2½	Fantastic Light	3	John Reid	Sir Michael Stoute (GB)
12	3	Albaran	6	Janos Tandari	Cathrine Erichsen (NOR)
13	15	Daryaba	3	Gérald Mossé	Alain de Royer-Dupré (FR)
14	10	Genghis Khan	3	Johnny Murtagh	Aidan O'Brien (IRE)

- Abbreviation: nk = neck

== Winner's details ==
Further details of the winner, Montjeu.

- Sex: Colt
- Foaled: 4 April 1996
- Country: Ireland
- Sire: Sadler's Wells; Dam: Floripedes (Top Ville)
- Owner: Michael Tabor
- Breeder: Sir James Goldsmith
