= 1998 Prix de l'Arc de Triomphe =

- Location: Longchamp Racecourse
- Date: October 4, 1998
- Winning horse: Sagamix

The 1998 Prix de l'Arc de Triomphe was a horse race held at Longchamp on Sunday 4 October 1998. It was the 77th running of the Prix de l'Arc de Triomphe.

The winner was Sagamix, a three-year-old colt trained in France by André Fabre. The winning jockey was Olivier Peslier.

== Race details ==
- Sponsor: no sponsor
- Purse: 7,000,000 F; First prize: 4,000,000 F
- Going: Soft
- Distance: 2,400 metres
- Number of runners: 14
- Winner's time: 2m 34.5s

== Full result ==
Pos.	Marg.	Horse	Age	Jockey	Trainer (Country)
1		Sagamix	3	Olivier Peslier	André Fabre (FR)
2	nk	Leggera	3	Richard Quinn	John Dunlop (GB)
3	¾	Tiger Hill	3	Andreas Suborics	Peter Schiergen (GER)
4	¾	Croco Rouge	3	Sylvain Guillot	Pascal Bary (FR)
5	¾	Caitano	4	Andrasch Starke	Andreas Schütz (GER)
6	½	Fragrant Mix	4	Alain Junk	André Fabre (FR)
7	hd	High-Rise	3	Michael Kinane	Luca Cumani (GB)
8	hd	Dream Well	3	Cash Asmussen	Pascal Bary (FR)
9	½	Sea Wave	3	Frankie Dettori	Saeed bin Suroor (GB)
10	1½	Happy Valentine	4	Daragh O'Donohoe	Saeed bin Suroor (GB)
11	1½	Courteous	3	Kieren Fallon	Paul Cole (GB)
12	1½	Limpid	3	Thierry Jarnet	André Fabre (FR)
13	1	Zainta	3	Gérald Mossé	Alain de Royer-Dupré (FR)
14	nk	Posidonas	6	Pat Eddery	Paul Cole (GB)

- Abbreviations: hd = head; nk = neck

== Winner's details ==
Further details of the winner, Sagamix.

- Sex: Colt
- Foaled: 15 March 1995
- Country: France
- Sire: Linamix; Dam: Saganeca (Sagace)
- Owner / Breeder: Jean-Luc Lagardère
