= Barney Roy =

British-bred Thoroughbred racehorse

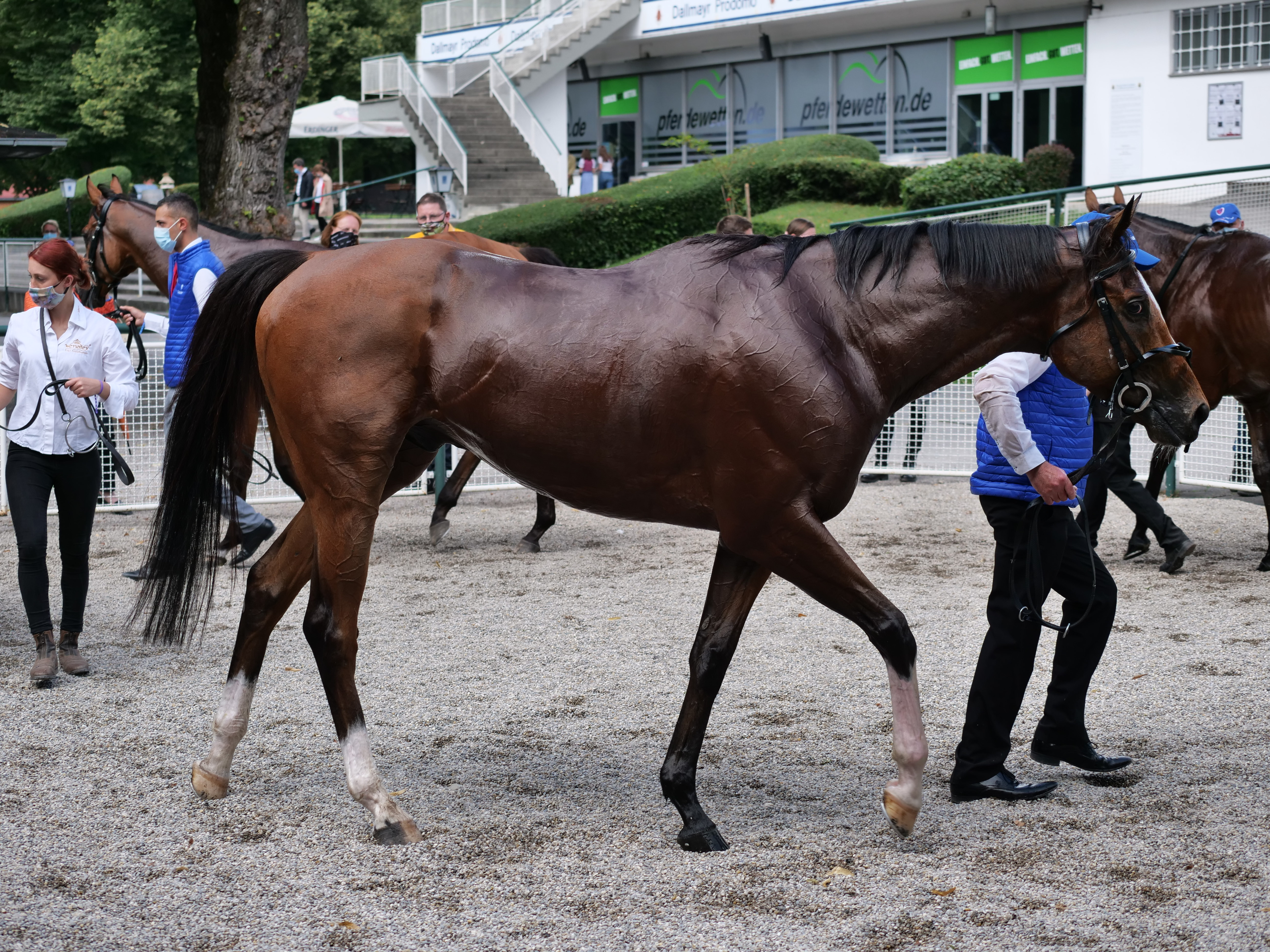
- Barney Roy in 2020
- Sire: Excelebration
- Grandsire: Exceed and Excel
- Dam: Alina
- Damsire: Galileo
- Sex: Gelding
- Foaled: 29 January 2014 (age 11)
- Country: United Kingdom
- Colour: Bay
- Breeder: Eliza Park International
- Owner: Sullivan Bloodstock Ltd; Godolphin
- Trainer: Richard Hannon Jr. Charlie Appleby
- Record: 18: 8-4-2
- Earnings: £1,214,420

Major wins
- Greenham Stakes (2017); St James's Palace Stakes (2017); Prix de Montretout (2019); Al Rashidiya (2020); Jebel Hatta (2020); Bayerisches Zuchtrennen (2020); Grosser Preis von Baden (2020)

Barney Roy (foaled 29 January 2014) is a British Thoroughbred racehorse. After winning his only race as a juvenile in 2016 he emerged as a top-class performer in the following year. He won the Greenham Stakes and finished second in the 2000 Guineas before recording his biggest victory in the St James's Palace Stakes. He went on to finish second in the Eclipse Stakes and third in the International Stakes before being retired to stud at the end of the year. His spell at stud proved unsuccessful and he returned to racing in the 2019 season. As a gelding in 2020 he recorded victories in the Al Rashidiya, Jebel Hatta, Bayerisches Zuchtrennen and Grosser Preis von Baden.

== Background ==
Barney Roy is a bay horse with a white blaze and three long white socks bred in England by Eliza Park International. In November 2014 he was consigned to the Tattersalls December Foals sale and bought for 30,000 guineas by A T Bloodstock. In the following August the yearling was put up for auction at the Goffs Doncaster Premier Yearlings Sale and was bought for £70,000 by the bloodstock agents Peter & Ross Doyle. The colt entered the ownership of Sullivan Bloodstock Ltd and was sent into training with Richard Hannon Jr. at East Everleigh in Wiltshire.

He was from the first crop of foals sired by Excelebration, an outstanding miler whose wins included the Prix du Moulin, Prix Jacques Le Marois and Queen Elizabeth II Stakes. Barney Roy's dam Alina showed little racing ability, being retired after running unplaced in two races as a two-year-old in France in 2012. She was the daughter of the Ridgewood Pearl Stakes winner Cheyenne Star and a descendant of the American broodmare Blazon who was a half-sister to both Exceller and Capote.

== Racing career ==
=== 2016: two-year-old season ===
Barney Roy made his racecourse debut in a maiden race over one mile at Haydock Park on 24 September and started at odds of 9/1 in a ten-runner field. Ridden by Sean Levey he took the lead inside the final furlong and drew away to win by three and a half lengths from the favourite Fujaira Bridge.

=== 2017: three-year-old season ===
Before the start of the 2017 season, Barney Roy was privately acquired by Sheikh Mohammed's Godolphin stable. He was ridden in all of his races as a three-year-old by James Doyle.

Barney Roy made his seasonal debut in the Greenham Stakes (a major trial race for the 2000 Guineas) over seven furlongs at Newbury Racecourse on 22 April. He started the 5/2 second favourite behind the other Godolphin runner Dream Castle, whilst the best-fancied of the other eight contenders was the Patton Stakes winner War Secretary. After tracking the leaders, Barney Roy overtook Dream Castle to assume the lead inside the final furlong and stayed on well to win by two lengths. Richard Hannon commented "He has relaxed enormously... I was a bit worried coming back from a mile to seven and you can see why, as he just took his time getting going. I thought he was in trouble, then he went 'whoosh'. I've liked him for a long time, though. He has got a chance of going to the Guineas." In the 209th running of the 2000 Guineas over the Rowley Mile at Newmarket Racecourse on 6 May, Barney Roy started the 7/2 second choice in the betting behind the Irish colt Churchill. He raced in mid-division before making a forward move in the last quarter mile but lost ground when stumbling badly approaching the final furlong. He recovered well and stayed on in the closing stages to take second place, a length behind Churchill and a neck in front of the French-trained Al Wukair.

Despite being regarded as a potential Epsom Derby contender, Barney Roy was kept to a mile and reappeared in the St James's Palace Stakes at Royal Ascot on 20 June. Churchill went off at odds of 1/2 with Barney Roy next in the betting on 5/2. The other six runners were Thunder Snow, Rivet, Lancaster Bomber (fourth in the 2000 Guineas), Peace Envoy (Rochestown Stakes), Forest Ranger and Mr Scaramanga. Barney Roy settled in fourth place as Rivet and Lancaster Bomber set the pace, before moving to the outside to make his challenge in the straight. He went to the front a furlong out and kept on to win by a length and a head from Lancaster Bomber and Thunder Snow, with Churchill well beaten in fourth. After the race Hannon said "He is the horse we always thought he was. We went to the Guineas to prove he is a good horse and he did that. He was slightly unlucky there and he has won very well today. He has a lovely long stride and he uses that. He takes time to get going and no doubt he will get further. I thought this track would suit him as the dips at Newmarket just caught him out."

On 8 July Barney Roy was moved up in distance and matched against older horses in the Eclipse Stakes over ten furlongs at Sandown Park. Starting the 9/4 second favourite behind the Derby runner-up Cliffs of Moher he settled in midfield before moving up to challenge for the lead in the straight. After a sustained struggle against the four-year-old Ulysses he was beaten a nose by his older rival in a photo-finish. In August Barney Roy faced Ulysses again in the International Stakes at York Racecourse. Racing on softer ground than he had previously encountered he briefly took the lead in the straight but was overtaken a furlong out and came home third behind Ulysses and Churchill. On 21 October the colt started 9/2 second favourite for the Champion Stakes at Ascot but ran poorly and finished ninth of the ten runners, seventeen lengths behind the winner Cracksman.

On 17 November it was announced that Barney Roy had been retired from racing. Hannon described him as "by far the best colt I've trained and the most athletic horse I have seen".

=== 2018: stud career ===
Barney Roy began his stallion career at Darley's Dalham Hall Stud at a fee of £10,000. In May 2018 Darley announced that Barney Roy was subfertile and options were being considered about his future, including a possible return to racing.

=== 2019: five-year-old season ===
After proving to be infertile at stud, Barney Roy was gelded and sent back into training with Charlie Appleby for the 2019 season. On 1 May Barney Roy began his comeback in the Listed Paradise Stakes over the straight mile at Ascot. Ridden by William Buick he started the 6/4 favourite and took the lead approaching the final furlong but was overtaken in the closing stages and beaten a neck by the four-year-old Zaaki. Three weeks later he was sent to France and started the 4/5 favourite for the Listed Prix de Montretout over 1600 metres at Longchamp, a race which saw him reunited with Doyle. After struggling to obtain a clear run in the closing stages he accelerated into the lead 50 metres from the finish and won by half a length from Bayoun. At Royal Ascot on 18 June the gelding was made 5/1 favourite for the Queen Anne Stakes but never looked likely to win and came home eighth of the sixteen runners behind Lord Glitters. He did not race again in 2019.

=== 2020: six-year-old season ===
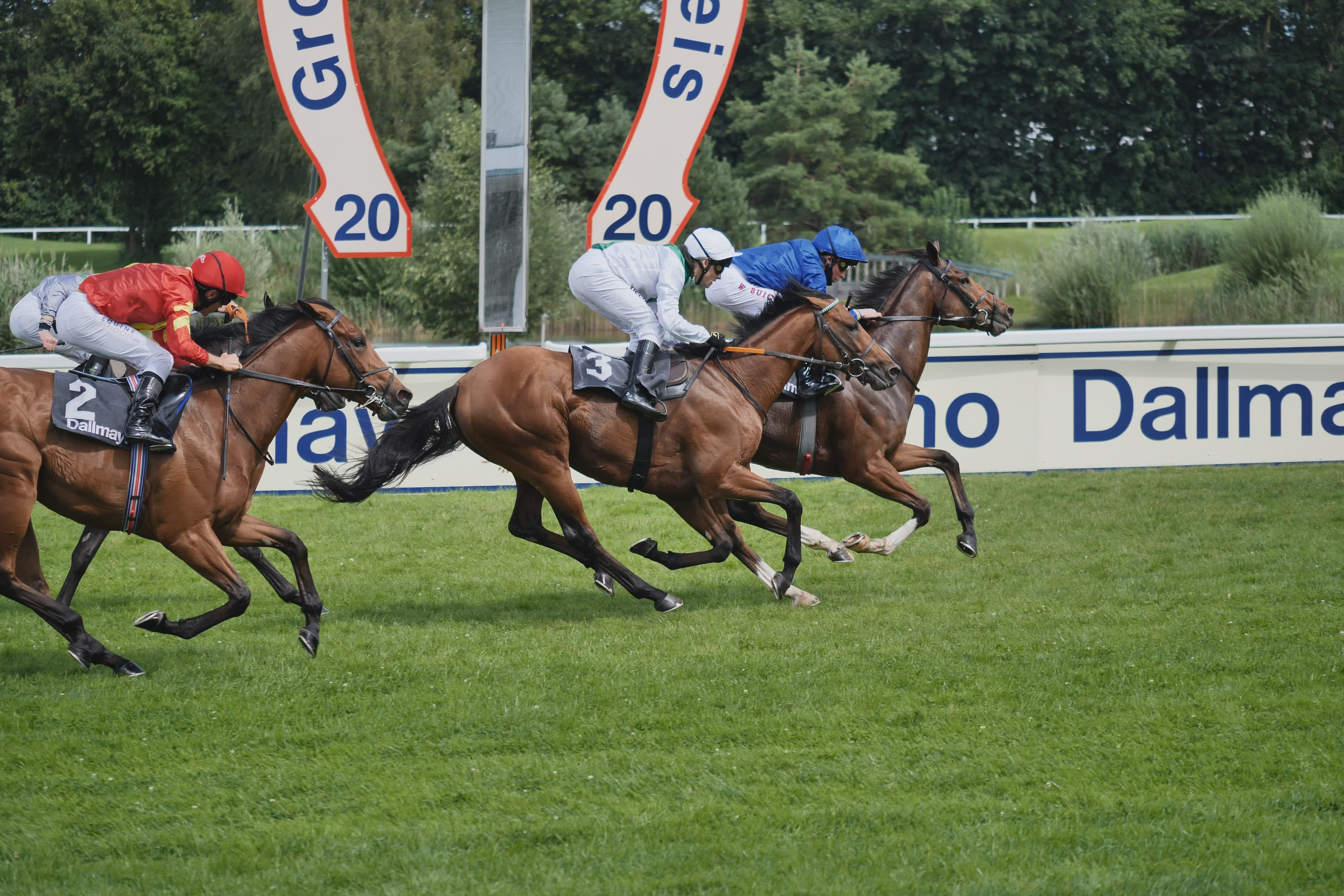
Barney Roy winning the Großer Dallmayr Preis 2020

Barney Roy spent the winter of 2019/20 at Godolphin's training base in Dubai and began his campaign in the Group 2 Al Rashidiya over 1800 metres on turf at Meydan Racecourse on 30 January. With Buick in the saddle he took the lead 300 metres from the finish and won "comfortably" by two and a quarter lengths from Dream Castle. Buick commented "He will come on a lot for that because he had been off a long time and was fresh and keen to get on with things before the race". On 7 March over the same course and distance Barney Roy went off the odds-on favourite for the Group 1 Jebel Hatta and won "easily" by a length and a quarter from the mare Magic Lily after taking the lead in the straight. After the race Buick said "He traveled very strongly into the race. I brought him out into the straight, and he picked them up easily. He has a nice cruising speed, which is helped by his big stride, but also he loves a flat track like Meydan, where he can use that stride." The race was intended to be a trial race for the Dubai Turf but the Dubai World Cup Night meeting was abandoned owing to the COVID-19 pandemic.

On his return to Europe, Barney Roy contested the Group 1 Prince of Wales's Stakes which was run behind closed doors at Royal Ascot on 17 June and finished third behind Lord North and Addeybb.

For his three remaining races of 2020, Barney Roy was campaigned in Germany. In the Group 1 Bayerisches Zuchtrennen over 2000 metres on rain-softened ground at Munich on 26 July he started favourite in a seven-runner field which also included Patrick Sarsfield (Meld Stakes), Durance (Gran Premio di Milano) and Quest The Moon (Grosser Preis der Badischen Wirtschaft). After being restrained by Buick in the early stages the gelding made progress along the inside rail in the straight, took the lead 100 metres from the finish, and won by a neck from Quest The Moon. Buick commented "It was a very tough race... I thought he struggled on the ground from a long way out, but his courage and his ability got him through." Barney Roy was stepped up in distance for the Preis Von Europa over 2400 metres at Cologne in August but failed to reproduce his best form on the soft ground and came home fourth of the seven runners, beaten one and a half lengths behind the winner Donjah. On 13 September, over the same distance, the gelding contested the Group 1 Grosser Preis von Baden and in which he was ridden by James Doyle and started the 4/1 second favourite behind the Deutsches Derby runner-up Torquator Tasso in an eight-runner field which also included Donjah, Quest The Moon and Communique (Princess of Wales's Stakes). After tracking the leaders on the outside Barney Roy overtook the front-running Communique 300 metres from the finish and won by one and a half lengths. After the race Appleby said "We are delighted to see Barney Roy win another group 1 race in his extended career. He has established himself as a real favorite in the yard and, now that we know he stays a mile and a half, it can hopefully open up a few more doors for him."

== Pedigree ==
Pedigree of Barney Roy (GB) bay gelding 2014
Sire Excelebration (IRE) 2008	Exceed and Excel (AUS); 2000	Danehill	Danzig
Sire Excelebration (IRE) 2008	Exceed and Excel (AUS); 2000	Danehill	Razyana
Sire Excelebration (IRE) 2008	Exceed and Excel (AUS); 2000	Patrona	Lomond
Sire Excelebration (IRE) 2008	Exceed and Excel (AUS); 2000	Patrona	Gladiolus
Sire Excelebration (IRE) 2008	Sun Shower (IRE); 2001	Indian Ridge	Ahonoora
Sire Excelebration (IRE) 2008	Sun Shower (IRE); 2001	Indian Ridge	Hillbrow
Sire Excelebration (IRE) 2008	Sun Shower (IRE); 2001	Miss Kemble	Warning
Sire Excelebration (IRE) 2008	Sun Shower (IRE); 2001	Miss Kemble	Sarah Siddons
Dam Alina (IRE) 2010	Galileo (IRE); 1998	Sadler's Wells	Northern Dancer
Dam Alina (IRE) 2010	Galileo (IRE); 1998	Sadler's Wells	Fairy Bridge
Dam Alina (IRE) 2010	Galileo (IRE); 1998	Urban Sea	Miswaki
Dam Alina (IRE) 2010	Galileo (IRE); 1998	Urban Sea	Allegretta
Dam Alina (IRE) 2010	Cheyenne Star (IRE); 2003	Mujahid	Danzig
Dam Alina (IRE) 2010	Cheyenne Star (IRE); 2003	Mujahid	Elrafa Ah
Dam Alina (IRE) 2010	Cheyenne Star (IRE); 2003	Charita	Lycius
Dam Alina (IRE) 2010	Cheyenne Star (IRE); 2003	Charita	Seme de Lys (family: 21-a)

- Barney Roy was inbred 4 × 4 to Danzig, meaning that this stallion appears twice in the fourth generation of his pedigree.
