= Excelebration =

Irish-bred Thoroughbred racehorse

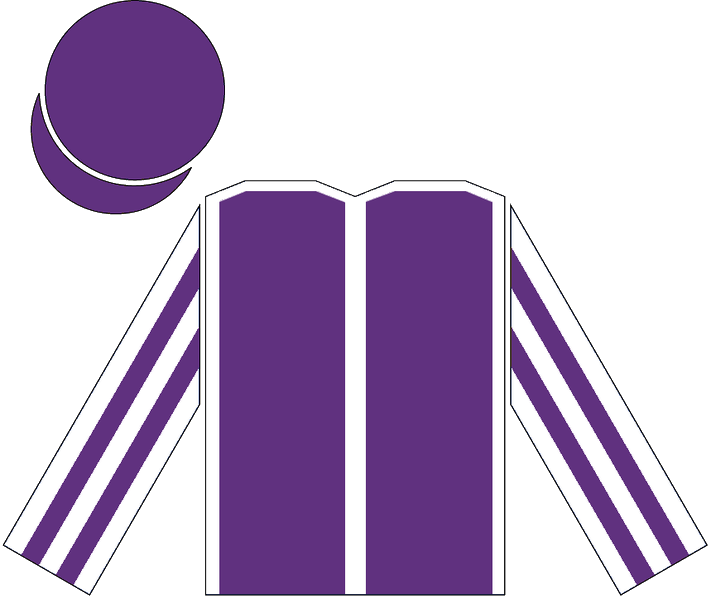
- Racing silks of Derrick Smith
- Sire: Exceed And Excel
- Grandsire: Danehill
- Dam: Sun Shower
- Damsire: Indian Ridge
- Sex: Stallion
- Foaled: 13 April 2008
- Country: Ireland
- Colour: Bay
- Breeder: Owenstown Stud
- Owner: Giuliano Manfredini; Derrick Smith; Mrs John Magnier; Michael Tabor
- Trainer: Marco Botti; Aidan O'Brien
- Record: 15: 8-4-1
- Earnings: £1,692,792

Major wins
- Mehl-Mülhens-Rennen (2011); Hungerford Stakes (2011); Prix du Moulin de Longchamp (2011); Gladness Stakes (2012); Prix Jacques Le Marois (2012); Queen Elizabeth II Stakes (2012)

Excelebration (foaled 13 April 2008) is an Irish-bred Thoroughbred racehorse. As a three-year-old he recorded wins in the Mehl-Mülhens-Rennen and Hungerford Stakes, before winning his first Group 1 in the Prix du Moulin de Longchamp. After finishing second to the unbeaten Frankel in his first two starts of 2012 he recorded successive victories in the Prix Jacques Le Marois and Queen Elizabeth II Stakes. These were followed by a fourth-place finish in the Breeders' Cup Mile, after which he was retired to stud. He was trained by Marco Botti until being transferred to Aidan O'Brien at the end of the 2011 flat season.

== Background ==
Excelebration is a bay horse foaled on 13 April 2008. Bred by Owenstown Stud, he is the son of Exceed and Excel, an Australian horse that won the Newmarket Handicap. Exceed and Excel's sire was Danehill, winner of the Sprint Cup and a British Champion sire. Excelebration's dam, Sun Shower, only raced once and is the daughter of Indian Ridge.

== Racing career ==
=== 2010: two-year-old season ===
Excelebration finished fourth in his first racecourse appearance in a maiden at Nottingham. He then won a Doncaster maiden and a class 3 race at Newmarket.

=== 2011: three-year-old-season ===
Excelebration started his three-year-old season in the Greenham Stakes, starting at 25/1, and finished second, four lengths behind 1/4 favourite Frankel. He then went to Germany for the Mehl-Mülhens-Rennen (German 2000 Guineas), which he won by seven lengths. He returned to England for the St James's Palace Stakes at Royal Ascot. After his win in Germany, he started the 10/1 second favourite and finished in third place behind Frankel (won had won the 2000 Guineas since the two last met) and Zoffany. Excelebration then went to Newbury for the Hungerford Stakes, winning by six lengths. After the Hungerford Stakes, Coolmore Stud purchased an interest in Excelebration. He travelled to France for the Prix du Moulin de Longchamp. Starting as the 11/8 favourite, he won by 1½ lengths from Rio De La Plata in a field that also included Dubawi Gold and Planteur. His last race of the season came in the Queen Elizabeth II Stakes at Champions' Day at Ascot. The race was won by Frankel by four lengths from Excelebration, with Coronation Stakes and Prix Jacques Le Marois winner Immortal Verse a further 3½ lengths back in third place.

=== 2012: four-year-old season ===
Excelebration started the 2012 season by easily winning the Gladness Stakes. He then took on Frankel in the Lockinge Stakes. He finished second to Frankel, who won by five lengths. At Royal Ascot he took on Frankel again in the Queen Anne Stakes. Frankel started at 1/10 and Excelebration was priced at 5/1. Frankel won by eleven lengths, with Excelebration again in second place. Timeform rated Frankel's performance as the best in their 64-year history. Excelebration's next start came in the Prix Jacques Le Marois, which he won by 1¼ lengths from Dubai Duty Free Stakes winner Cityscape. The field also included Prix d'Ispahan winner Golden Lilac, Prix Rothschild winner Elusive Kate and Prix Maurice de Gheest winner Moonlight Cloud. On 20 October at Ascot, Excelebration won the Queen Elizabeth II Stakes. Starting as the 10/11 favourite, he beat Cityscape by three lengths, with Elusive Kate a further three and a quarter lengths behind in third place. On his final appearance, Excelebration was sent to California to contest the Breeders' Cup Mile at Santa Anita Park. He started favourite but lacked his customary turn of foot and finished fourth of the nine runners behind the US trained horse Wise Dan. Excelebration earned £1,692,792 during his racing career.

== Assessment ==
Excelebration was officially rated as the joint seventh best horse in the world in 2011, with a rating of 126. He was rated the third best miler behind Frankel and Canford Cliffs. At the end of 2012 he was ranked as the joint-third-best horse in the world with Black Caviar, behind only Frankel and Cirrus des Aigles.

== Stud record ==
Excelebration was retired from racing to become a breeding stallion for the Coolmore Stud in Ireland. His covering fee for the 2013 season was set at €22,500. In his first season at stud he sired Barney Roy. Excelebration left Coolmore in 2019 and in 2021 was reported to be standing at stud in Morocco.

== Pedigree ==
Pedigree of Excelebration, bay colt, 2008
Sire Exceed and Excel (AUS) b. 2000	Danehill b. 1986	Danzig b. 1977	Northern Dancer*
Sire Exceed and Excel (AUS) b. 2000	Danehill b. 1986	Danzig b. 1977	Pas de Nom
Sire Exceed and Excel (AUS) b. 2000	Danehill b. 1986	Razyana b. 1981	His Majesty
Sire Exceed and Excel (AUS) b. 2000	Danehill b. 1986	Razyana b. 1981	Spring Adieu
Sire Exceed and Excel (AUS) b. 2000	Patrona ch. 1994	Lomond b. 1980	Northern Dancer*
Sire Exceed and Excel (AUS) b. 2000	Patrona ch. 1994	Lomond b. 1980	My Charmer
Sire Exceed and Excel (AUS) b. 2000	Patrona ch. 1994	Gladiolus ch. 1974	Watch Your Step
Sire Exceed and Excel (AUS) b. 2000	Patrona ch. 1994	Gladiolus ch. 1974	Back Britches
Dam Sun Shower (IRE) b. 2001	Indian Ridge ch. 1985	Ahonoora ch. 1975	Lorenzaccio
Dam Sun Shower (IRE) b. 2001	Indian Ridge ch. 1985	Ahonoora ch. 1975	Helen Nichols
Dam Sun Shower (IRE) b. 2001	Indian Ridge ch. 1985	Hillbrow ch. 1975	Swing Easy
Dam Sun Shower (IRE) b. 2001	Indian Ridge ch. 1985	Hillbrow ch. 1975	Golden City
Dam Sun Shower (IRE) b. 2001	Miss Kemble b. 1994	Warning b. 1985	Known Fact
Dam Sun Shower (IRE) b. 2001	Miss Kemble b. 1994	Warning b. 1985	Slightly Dangerous
Dam Sun Shower (IRE) b. 2001	Miss Kemble b. 1994	Sarah Siddons b. 1973	Le Levanstell
Dam Sun Shower (IRE) b. 2001	Miss Kemble b. 1994	Sarah Siddons b. 1973	Mariel

Note: b. = Bay, ch. = Chestnut

* Excelebration is inbred 4 × 4 to Northern Dancer. This means that the stallion appears twice in the fourth generation of his pedigree.
