= Sarah Siddons (horse) =

French-bred Thoroughbred racehorse

- Sire: Le Levanstell
- Grandsire: Le Lavandou
- Dam: Mariel
- Damsire: Relko
- Sex: Mare
- Foaled: 6 May 1973
- Country: France
- Colour: Bay
- Breeder: Ardenode Stud
- Owner: Meg Mullion
- Trainer: Paddy Prendergast
- Record: 12: 3-3-1

Major wins
- Irish 1,000 Guineas (1976); Yorkshire Oaks (1976)

Awards
- Timeform rating 102p (1975), 122 (1976), 115 (1977)

Sarah Siddons (6 May 1973 – 2000) was a French-bred, Irish-trained Thoroughbred racehorse. She was a well-bred mare, being descended from a half-sister of the outstanding Irish racehorse Ragusa. As a two-year-old in 1975 she showed promise when winning her only race of the season. In the following year she was rated the best three-year-old filly trained in the British Isles in a division which was otherwise dominated by French-trained horses. She recorded Group One wins in the Irish 1,000 Guineas and Yorkshire Oaks, as well as finishing second to Lagunette in both the Irish Oaks and the Prix Vermeille. She failed to win as a four-year-old, but became a very successful broodmare.

== Background ==
Sarah Siddons was a "strong, lengthy, attractive" bay mare with a white star bred in France by her owner, Meg Mullion's Ardenode Stud. Her sire was the Seamus McGrath-owned Le Levanstell, who won the Sussex Stakes and the Queen Elizabeth II Stakes in 1961 before a successful stud career with his best offspring including Levmoss and Le Moss. Le Levanstell was a representative of the Byerley Turk sire line, unlike more than 95% of modern thoroughbreds, who descend directly from the Darley Arabian. Sarah Siddons was the first of only three foals produced by Mariel, a high-class mare who won the Pretty Polly Stakes, and was placed in the Irish 1000 Guineas, Epsom Oaks and Irish Oaks. Mariel's dam Ela Marita won the Fred Darling Stakes and the Musidora Stakes and was a half-sister to Ragusa. The filly, named after the great actress Sarah Siddons, was sent into training with the veteran Paddy Prendergast at his stables near the Curragh in Ireland.

== Racing career ==
=== 1975: two-year-old season ===
On her racecourse debut she started favourite in a seven furlong event for previously unraced horses at Phoenix Park Racecourse in October. She won by one and a half lengths from Conduct Unbecoming with a large gap back to the other fourteen runners.

=== 1976: three-year-old season ===
On her three-year-old debut Sarah Siddons finished second in the seven-furlong Athasi Stakes at the Curragh in April, beaten three quarters of a length by Serenica. On 14 May, the filly was moved up in class for the Irish 1000 Guineas over one mile at the same course. Ridden as in most of her early races by Christy Roche, she started the 9/2 third choice in a fourteen-runner field with the British-trained Sunbird starting 11/4 favourite ahead of Serenica on 4/1. A quarter of a mile from the finish she appeared to be struggling but stayed on under pressure and as the field entered the final furlong she was disputing the lead alongside Clover Princess, Krassata and Lady Singer. Sarah Siddons took the advantage in the closing stages and won by a length from Clover Princess with Lady Singer a length further back in third.

For her next race, Sarah Siddons was sent to France to contest the Prix de Diane over 2100 metres at Chantilly Racecourse on 13 June. Starting a 50/1 outsider in a very strong field she finished well to take fifth place behind Pawneese, Riverqueen, Lagunette and Antrona with Theia in sixth. Sarah Siddons returned to Ireland for the Irish Oaks over one and a half miles at the Curragh on 17 July and started 4/1 third favourite behind Acoma (a six-length winner of her only previous start) and Lagunette. She finished second of the eighteen runners, two lengths behind Lagunette and half a length in front of the Vincent O'Brien trained I've A Bee. On her first appearance in England, Sarah Siddons started 100/30 second favourite behind her fellow Irish challenger I've A Bee in a field of thirteen for the Yorkshire Oaks at York Racecourse in August. The other runners included Centrocon (Lancashire Oaks), African Dancer (Cheshire Oaks) and Roses for the Star (runner-up to Pawneese in The Oaks). She was towards the rear of the field entering the straight but was then switched to the outside and began to make steady progress. She was still only fifth a furlong out but continued her run to take the lead in the final strides and won by a head from African Dancer with Roses for the Star in third.

Although the filly had run well on good and firm ground Prendergast had insisted that the Sarah Siddons would be better suited by a soft surface, which she encountered for the first time in the Prix Vermeille at Longchamp Racecourse on 19 September. With Lester Piggott taking over the ride from Roche, she started a 24/1 outsider in a field which included Pawneese, Riverqueen, Lagunette and Theia. She produced a strong late run to take the lead from Lagunette inside the last 200 metres and looked the likely winner, but Lagunette rallied to defeat the Irish filly by a nose. Timeform described Sarah Siddons' performance as "the race of her life".

=== 1977: four-year-old season ===
Sarah Siddons remained in training as a four-year-old but failed to win in five races. After finishing third over seven furlongs on her debut in the Gladness Stakes at the Curragh, she finished last of the twelve runners behind Arctic Tern in the Prix Ganay at Longchamp on 1 May. At York in August she produced her best performance of the year when finishing fourth behind Relkino, Artaius and Orange Bay in the Benson and Hedges Gold Cup. In October she was equipped with blinkers for the Prix de l'Arc de Triomphe on 2 October. Ridden by Joe Mercer, she started a 59/1 outsider and finished last of the twenty-six runners behind Alleged.

== Assessment and awards ==
In 1975, the independent Timeform organisation gave her a rating of 102 p (the p indicating that she was likely to make significantly more than usual improvement), twenty-six pounds behind their top-rated juvenile filly Theia.

In 1976, Timeform awarded her a rating of 122, making her nine pounds inferior to Pawneese, but described her as "undoubtedly the best three-year-old filly trained in either England or Ireland".

Despite failing to win in 1977, Sarah Siddons was rated the best older female racehorse in Ireland. Timeform gave her a rating of 115.

== Breeding record ==
Sarah Siddons was a prolific and successful broodmare, producing fifteen foals (including at least eight winners) in sixteen years between 1979 and 1994. She died in 2000. Her foals included:

- Gertrude Lawrence, a bay filly, foaled in 1979, sired by Ballymore. Unraced. Grand-dam of Leggera (Prix Vermeille, second in the 1998 Prix de l'Arc de Triomphe).
- Seymour Hicks, bay colt, 1980, by Ballymore. Won five races in Europe, including the Great Voltigeur Stakes in which he defeated Teenoso. Later a successful National Hunt stallion, siring See More Business.
- Princess Pati, bay filly, 1981, by Top Ville. Won four races including the Pretty Polly Stakes and the Irish Oaks. Dam of Pasternak (Cambridgeshire Handicap).
- Convention, brown colt, 1982, by General Assembly. Sold as a yearling for a European record of 1,400,000 guineas in 1983 at Newmarket. He failed to win a race, but finished second on four occasions.
- Miss Siddons, bay filly, 1983 by Cure the Blues. Unplaced in two starts.
- Sidara, bay filly, 1984, by Golden Fleece. Reported to have won three races in France.
- Metternich, bay gelding, 1985, by Habitat. Won three races.
- Kemble, colt, 1986, by Habitat. Unraced.
- Star Quest, bay colt, 1987, by Rainbow Quest. Won four races.
- Quickstepping, bay filly, 1988, by Dancing Brave. Unplaced in four starts.
- Cantanta, brown filly, 1989, by Top Ville. Won once from five races. Dam of Upgrade (Triumph Hurdle).
- Dansara, bay filly, 1990, by Dancing Brave, unraced. Dam of Self Defense (Sharp Novices' Hurdle, Agfa Hurdle); grandam of the St Leger runner-up The Last Drop and Puncher Clynch (Ballysax Stakes).
- Acting Brave, bay colt, 1991, by Dancing Brave. Won three races.
- Side Note, bay colt, 1993, by Warning. Won one race.
- Miss Kemble, bay filly, 1994 by Warning. Unplaced in only race. Grandam of Excelebration and Mull of Killough (Darley Stakes, Earl of Sefton Stakes).
- Java Sea, brown gelding, 1996, by Warning. Won three races.

== Pedigree ==
Pedigree of Sarah Siddons (FR), bay mare 1973
Sire Le Levanstell (IRE) 1957	Le Lavandou (FR); 1944	Djebel	Tourbillon
Sire Le Levanstell (IRE) 1957	Le Lavandou (FR); 1944	Djebel	Loika
Sire Le Levanstell (IRE) 1957	Le Lavandou (FR); 1944	Lavande	Rustom Pasha
Sire Le Levanstell (IRE) 1957	Le Lavandou (FR); 1944	Lavande	Livadia
Sire Le Levanstell (IRE) 1957	Stella's Sister (IRE); 1950	Ballyogan	Fair Trial
Sire Le Levanstell (IRE) 1957	Stella's Sister (IRE); 1950	Ballyogan	Serial
Sire Le Levanstell (IRE) 1957	Stella's Sister (IRE); 1950	My Aid	Knight of the Garter
Sire Le Levanstell (IRE) 1957	Stella's Sister (IRE); 1950	My Aid	Flying Aid
Dam Mariel (GB) 1968	Relko (GB); 1960	Tanerko	Tantieme
Dam Mariel (GB) 1968	Relko (GB); 1960	Tanerko	La Divine
Dam Mariel (GB) 1968	Relko (GB); 1960	Relance	Relic
Dam Mariel (GB) 1968	Relko (GB); 1960	Relance	Polaire
Dam Mariel (GB) 1968	Ela Marita (GB); 1961	Red God	Nasrullah
Dam Mariel (GB) 1968	Ela Marita (GB); 1961	Red God	Spring Run
Dam Mariel (GB) 1968	Ela Marita (GB); 1961	Fantan	Ambiorix
Dam Mariel (GB) 1968	Ela Marita (GB); 1961	Fantan	Red Eye (Family: 9)
