= Aphrodite Stakes =

Flat horse race in Britain

Aphrodite Stakes
2026
Brielle	Club Class	Orionis

Previous years
2025
Spirited Style	Sueno	Jane Temple
2024
Mistral Star	Shining Jewel	Ambiente Amigo
2023
Novakai	Cloudbreaker	Star Fortress
2022
Eternal Pearl	Rose Of Kildare	Viola
2021
Golden Pass	Free Wind	Abstinence

2020-2011
2020
Cabaletta	Lady	Makawee
2019
Dame Malliot	Spirit Of Appin	Sparkle Roll
2018
Worth Waiting	Highgarden	Dramatic Queen
2017
God Given	Isabel De Urbina	More Mischief
2016
Forever Popular	Twitch	Miss Marjurie
2015
Jordan Princess	Dream Child	Desert Snow
2014
Noble Protector	Criteria	Groovejet
2013
Waila	Gertrude Versed	Soho Dancer
2012
Hazel Lavery	Dorcas Lane	Ambivalent
2011
Wild Coco	Meeznah	Opera Gal

2010-2001
2010
Eastern Aria	Snoqualmie Girl	Lady Artemisia
2009
Barshiba	Princess Taylor	Uvinza
2008
Dar Re Mi	Folk Opera	Icon Project
2007
Turbo Linn	Green Room	Under The Rainbow
2006
Quenched	Cresta Gold	Pictavia
2005
Polar Jem	Asawer	Blaze of Colour
2004
Beneventa	Selebela	Portrait of A Lady
2003
Treble Heights	New Orchid	Thingmebob
2002
Frosty Welcome	Marani	Pasithea
2001
Ranin	Love Everlasting	Rockerlong

2000-1994
2000
Abitara	Chez Cherie	Evil Empire
1999
Suhaad	Innuendo	Bryony Brind
1998
Catchascatchcan	Kadaka	Tuning
1997
Anno Luce	Kaliana	Beauchamp Jade
1996
Shemozzle	Balalaika	Place de L'Opera
1995
Hagwah	Tinashaan	Tillandsia
1994
Wandesta	Darrery	Moon Carnival

The Aphrodite Stakes is a Listed flat horse race in Great Britain open to mares and fillies aged three years or older. It is run at Newmarket over a distance of 1 mile and 4 furlongs (2,414 metres), and it is scheduled to take place each year in July.

The race was first run in 1994.

== Records ==
Leading jockey (3 wins):

- Richard Hills – Suhaad (1999), Ranin (2001), Eastern Aria (2010)

Leading trainer (5 wins):

- John Gosden – Shemozzle (1996), Anno Luce (1997), Marani (2002), Treble Heights (2003), Quenched (2006)

== Winners ==
Year	Winner	Age	Jockey	Trainer	Time
1994	Wandesta	3	Frankie Dettori	Roger Charlton	2:31.09
1995	Hagwah	3	Michael Roberts	Ben Hanbury	2:29.11
1996	Shemozzle	3	Michael Hills	John Gosden	2:28.63
1997	Anno Luce	4	Frankie Dettori	John Gosden	2:31.25
1998	Catchascatchcan	3	Willie Ryan	Henry Cecil	2:27.09
1999	Suhaad	3	Richard Hills	Alec Stewart	2:33.24
2000	Abitara	4	Jason Weaver	Andreas Wohler	2:31.10
2001	Ranin	3	Richard Hills	Ed Dunlop	2:30.12
2002	Frosty Welcome	3	John Egan	Geoff Wragg	2:31.02
2002	Marani	4	Richard Hughes	John Gosden	2:31.02
2003	Treble Heights	4	Jimmy Fortune	John Gosden	2:29.90
2004	Beneventa	4	Seb Sanders	John Dunlop	2:28.47
2005	Polar Jem	5	Adrian McCarthy	George Margarson	2:27.87
2006	Quenched	3	Robert Havlin	John Gosden	2:33.32
2007	Turbo Linn	4	Neil Callan	Alan Swinbank	2:28.83
2008	Dar Re Mi	3	Richard Mullen	John Gosden	2:27.52
2009	Barshiba	5	Jamie Spencer	David Elsworth	2:28.05
2010	Eastern Aria	4	Richard Hills	Mark Johnston	2:28.08
2011	Wild Coco	3	Eddie Ahern	Henry Cecil	2:31.56
2012	Hazel Lavery	3	William Carson	Charles Hills	2:33.48
2013	Waila	3	Ryan Moore	Sir Michael Stoute	2:31.23
2014	Noble Protector	4	Shelley Birkett	Stuart Kittow	2:29.40
2015	Jordan Princess	4	Adam Kirby	Luca Cumani	2:34.64
2016	Forever Popular	4	Dane O'Neill	William Haggas	2:39.92
2017	God Given	3	George Wood	Luca Cumani	2:35.98
2018	Worth Waiting	3	Franny Norton	David Lanigan	2:33.85
2019	Dame Malliot	3	Hollie Doyle	Ed Vaughan	2:27.52
2020 (Note: The 2020 race was run at Newbury due to the COVID-19 pandemic in the United Kingdom)	Cabaletta	3	David Egan	Roger Varian	2:32.10
2021	Golden Pass	4	James Doyle	Hugo Palmer	2:31.62
2022	Eternal Pearl	3	William Buick	Charlie Appleby	2:31.71
2023	Novakai	3	Sam James	Karl Burke	2:33.40
2024	Mistral Star	4	Rhys Clutterbuck	Hughie Morrison	2:29.64
2025	Spirited Style	3	Billy Loughnane	Charlie Appleby	2:35.48
2026	Brielle	4	Daniel Tudhope	David O'Meara	2:32.01

== See also ==
- Horse racing in Great Britain
- List of British flat horse races
