= Mendez (horse) =

French-bred Thoroughbred racehorse

- Sire: Bellypha
- Grandsire: Lyphard
- Dam: Miss Carina
- Damsire: Caro
- Sex: Stallion
- Foaled: 2 April 1981
- Country: France
- Colour: Grey
- Breeder: Scuderia Diamante
- Owner: Philip Niarchos
- Trainer: François Boutin
- Record: 12:5-1-3

Major wins
- Prix des Chênes (1983); Prix de Fontainebleau (1984); Prix Jean Prat (1984); Prix du Moulin (1984)

Awards
- Timeform rating 121 (1983), 128 (1984)

Mendez (2 April 1981 – 25 September 1995) was a French Thoroughbred racehorse and sire. He was one of the best colts of his generation in France and produced his best performances over one mile/ 1600 metres on soft ground. As a two-year-old in 1983 he won the Prix des Chênes and was placed in both the Grand Critérium and the William Hill Futurity. In the following year he recorded Group One successes in the Prix Jean Prat and the Prix du Moulin as well as winning the Prix de Fontainebleau and finishing an unlucky third in the Poule d'Essai des Poulains. He was retired from racing and had some success as a breeding stallion in France and Japan.

== Background ==
Mendez was a grey horse bred in France by Scuderia Diamante. He was from the first crop of foals sired by Bellypha one of the highest-rated racehorses of his generation in Europe at both two and three years of age. Mendez's dam, Miss Carina, was the highest-rated filly of her generation in Italy, winning the Premio Dormello in 1977. Both Bellypha and Miss Carina were greys.

The colt was offered for sale as a yearling in 1982 and was bought for ₣1,000,000 by representatives of Philip Niarchos the son of the Greek shipping magnate Stavros Niarchos. He was sent into training with François Boutin and was ridden in most of his races by the American jockey Cash Asmussen.

== Racing career ==
=== 1983: two-year-old season ===
After finishing unplaced in a race over 1200 metres on his debut, Mendez won a minor race over 1100 metres at Évry in July, winning easily after taking the lead at half way. In September, Mendez was moved up in class and distance and started favourite for the Prix des Chênes over 1600 metres at Longchamp Racecourse. Ridden by Asmussen, he took the lead from the start before accelerating away from his opponents in the straight and winning by two and a half lengths from the filly Ina Seville. In the Group One Grand Critérium over the same course and distance in October, Mendez was ridden by the Scottish jockey Willie Carson as Asmussen opted to ride the stable's other contender Seattle Song. Held up at the back of the eight runner field, Mendez struggled to obtain a clear run in the straight but finished strongly to finish third behind Treizieme and Truculent, beaten one and a half lengths by the winner. Two weeks later, Mendez was sent to England to contest the William Hill Futurity over one mile at Doncaster Racecourse. Ridden by Asmussen, he was made the 11/8 favourite ahead of the Guy Harwood-trained Alphabatim. Asmussen repeated the tactics employed by Carson, holding the colt up at the back of the field in the early stages and encountered similar difficulties obtaining a clear run early in the straight. He moved up to challenge for the lead in the final quarter mile but drifted to left in the closing stages and was beaten half a length by Alphabatim.

=== 1984: three-year-old season ===
Mendez made his debut as a three-year-old in the Prix de Fontainebleau over 1600 metres at Longchamp in April and won by a neck from Nikos with Siberian Express in third. In the Group One Poule d'Essai des Poulains over the same course and distance he finished third, beaten less than a length by the winner Siberian Express after being obstructed in the straight and appeared to be a somewhat unlucky loser. He was then moved up in distance for the Prix Lupin over 2100 metres at Longchamp in May. He appeared to be travelling easily in the straight but faltered in the closing stages and finished third to Dahar and Cariellor, suggesting that he lacked the necessary stamina for middle-distance competition. Mendez's connections appeared to concur, and rather than contesting the 2400 metre Prix du Jockey Club at Chantilly Racecourse in June he was redirected to the 1800 metre Prix Jean Prat on the same card. He took the lead soon after the start, went clear of the field 400 metres from the finish and won by two and a half lengths from Yashgan.

After a break of two and a half months, Mendez returned in the Group One Prix Jacques Le Marois over 1600 metres at Deauville Racecourse in which he was matched against older horses for the first time. Racing on firm ground he looked outpaced from the start and finished fifth behind the British-trained Lear Fan, with Palace Music second and Siberian Express third. In August, Mendez faced Lear Fan again in the Prix du Moulin at Longchamp a race which attracted Siberian Express and the leading British filly Meis-El-Reem, winner of the Child Stakes and the Prix d'Astarte. In contrast to the conditions at Deauville, the ground at Longchamp was very soft and muddy and Mendez appeared to relish the surface. He raced in fourth and looked unlikely to win when Lear Fan went clear of the field in the straight. Under a strong ride from Asmussen however, he made relentless progress in the closing stages, overtook Lear Fan in the final strides and won by half a length, with Meis-El-Reem a short head away in third. In October, Mendez was brought back in distance for the Prix de la Forêt over 1400 metres but ran poorly and finished unplaced behind Procida.

== Assessment ==
In the official International Classification for 1983, Mendez was given a rating of 76, twelve pounds behind the top-rated two-year-old El Gran Senor. The independent Timeform organisation gave him a rating of 121, ten pounds behind El Gran Senor. Timeform gave Mendez a rating of 128 in 1984, eight pounds behind their leading three-year-old and Horse of the Year El Gran Senor. In their annual Racehorses of 1984, Timeform noted his tendency to fight against his jockeys' attempts to restrain him but described him as "undoubtedly game". In the International Classification he was rated the twelfth-best three-year-old colt in Europe, thirteen pounds behind El Gran Senor.

== Stud record ==
Mendez was retired from racing to become a breeding stallion at the Haras de Fresnay-le-Buffard. In 1987, he was exported to Japan, where his last foal were born in 1996. Mendez died 25 September 1995 in Japan. By far the most important of his offspring was Linamix, who won the Poule d'Essai des Poulains and became a very successful breeding stallion, siring the Prix de l'Arc de Triomphe winner Sagamix, and the leading Australian racehorse Manighar. Mendez was a true-breeding (homozygotic) grey, meaning that all of his foals were also grey.

== Pedigree ==
Pedigree of Mendez (FR) grey stallion 1981
Sire Bellypha (IRE) 1976	Lyphard (USA); 1969	Northern Dancer	Nearctic
Sire Bellypha (IRE) 1976	Lyphard (USA); 1969	Northern Dancer	Natalma
Sire Bellypha (IRE) 1976	Lyphard (USA); 1969	Goofed	Court Martial
Sire Bellypha (IRE) 1976	Lyphard (USA); 1969	Goofed	Barra
Sire Bellypha (IRE) 1976	Belga (FR); 1968	Le Fabuleux	Wild Risk
Sire Bellypha (IRE) 1976	Belga (FR); 1968	Le Fabuleux	Anguar
Sire Bellypha (IRE) 1976	Belga (FR); 1968	Belle de Retz	Gilles de Retz
Sire Bellypha (IRE) 1976	Belga (FR); 1968	Belle de Retz	Abracadabra
Dam Miss Carina (FR) 1975	Caro (IRE); 1967	Fortino	Grey Sovereign
Dam Miss Carina (FR) 1975	Caro (IRE); 1967	Fortino	Ranavalo
Dam Miss Carina (FR) 1975	Caro (IRE); 1967	Chambord	Chamossaire
Dam Miss Carina (FR) 1975	Caro (IRE); 1967	Chambord	Life Hill
Dam Miss Carina (FR) 1975	Miss Pia (USA); 1965	Olympia	Heliopolis
Dam Miss Carina (FR) 1975	Miss Pia (USA); 1965	Olympia	Miss Dolphin
Dam Miss Carina (FR) 1975	Miss Pia (USA); 1965	Ultimate Weapon	Bold Ruler
Dam Miss Carina (FR) 1975	Miss Pia (USA); 1965	Ultimate Weapon	Outer Space (Family 23-b)
