= Shahtoush =

Irish-bred Thoroughbred racehorse

- Racing silks of Diana Nagle & Susan Magnier
- Sire: Alzao
- Grandsire: Lyphard
- Dam: Formulate
- Damsire: Reform
- Sex: Mare
- Foaled: 29 April 1995
- Country: Ireland
- Colour: Bay
- Breeder: Barronstown Stud & Ron Con Ltd
- Owner: Diana Nagle & Susan Magnier
- Trainer: Aidan O'Brien
- Record: 11: 3-2-1
- Earnings: £254,022

Major wins
- Epsom Oaks (1998)

Honours
- Timeform rating 120

Shahtoush (foaled 29 April 1995) was an Irish Thoroughbred racehorse and broodmare best known for winning The Oaks in 1998. In a racing career which lasted from August 1997 to September 1998 the filly ran eleven times and won three races. Shahtoush won only one minor race as a two-year-old, but showed top-class form when she finished third in the Group One Moyglare Stud Stakes. In 1998 she finished second in the 1000 Guineas at Newmarket Racecourse and then returned to England to win the Classic Oaks over one and a half miles at Epsom. She was beaten in her two remaining races, finishing unplaced in the Yorkshire Oaks and the Irish Champion Stakes.

== Background ==
Shahtoush is a bay mare with a small white star bred in Ireland by a partnership between the Barronstown Stud and Ron Con Ltd. She was sired by Alzao, a son of Lyphard who never won above Group Three level, but became a successful breeding stallion, his progeny including Maraahel (Hardwicke Stakes), Second Set and Alborada. Shahtoush's dam Formulate, was a successful racehorse, whose wins included the Fillies' Mile and the May Hill Stakes. At stud she produced several winners including Game Plan, a filly who finished second in the Oaks in 1990. As a descendant of the broodmare Double Life, Shahtoush was related to horses such as Meld, Charlottown and Kalaglow.

In October 1996, the yearling filly was consigned to the Goffs sales where she was bought for IR£60,000 by the bloodstock agent John O'Byrne. During her racing career she was owned jointly by the Barronstown Stud's Diana Nagle and Susan Magnier, representing the Coolmore organisation. Like most Coolmore horses, Shahtoush was sent into training with Aidan O'Brien at Ballydoyle.

== Racing career ==
=== 1997: two-year-old season ===
Shahtoush began her racing career by finishing fifth in a twenty-runner maiden race at Leopardstown in August 1997. She was the second choice of the Ballydoyle entry that day, starting at odds of 10/1, whilst her stable companion, Mempari, finished second as the 7/4 favourite. She was then moved up in class for the Group One Moyglare Stud Stakes at the Curragh two weeks later. As in her debut, she was not the stable's favoured runner, starting a 16/1 outsider whereas Heeremandi started 3/1 favourite. Ridden by Seamie Heffernan, Shahtoush finished strongly to take third, beaten less than a length by the winner Tarascon, and one place ahead of Heeremandi. Shahtoush was dropped back to maiden company for her next race, and started 7/4 favourite, but was beaten a short head by Wish Me Luck. In October, Shahtoush contested the Group Three C. L. Weld Park Stakes at the Curragh and finished fourth to the English-trained filly Alborada. Later that month, Shahtoush won a race at the fifth attempt when she was sent to Gowran Park for a maiden race. Starting at odds of 1/2 against moderate opposition, she won easily by four and a half lengths.

=== 1998: three-year-old season ===
On her three-year-old debut, Shahtoush started evens favourite for the April Fillies' Stakes at the Curragh She was rated fifteen pounds superior to her opponents and recorded a predictably easy three and a half length win. Christy Roche, who had ridden Shahtoush in both her wins, was replaced by Mick Kinane when the filly was sent to England for the 1000 Guineas four weeks later. Starting at odds of 9/1, Shahtoush was unable to compete with Cape Verdi, but stayed on strongly in the closing stages to take second place, five lengths behind the Godolphin-trained winner. Shahtoush was expected to be a leading contender for the Irish 1,000 Guineas three weeks later, starting 5/1 third favourite, but ran poorly, weakening in the closing stages to finish tenth behind Tarascon.

With Cape Verdi aimed at the Derby, the Henry Cecil-trained Midnight Line was made favourite for the Oaks ahead of Godolphin's Musidora Stakes winner Bahr, with Shahtoush starting at odds of 12/1. Kinane restrained the Irish filly in the early stages before moving forward in the straight and accelerating past Midnight Line and Bahr a furlong from the finish. As the favourite weakened, the closing stages of the race devolved into a contest between Shahtoush and Bahr, with the Irish filly prevailing by three quarters of a length. Shahtoush's finishing burst appeared to catch Bahr's jockey Frankie Dettori by surprise and Kinane's ride on the winner was described as a "tactical masterclass" by The Independent. Aidan O'Brien, who was winning the Oaks with his first ever runner at the course, explained Shahtoush's improvement by stating that she had been unable to show her best on firm ground in her previous race.

Shahtoush missed a run in the Irish Oaks, O'Brien deciding that the filly needed more time to recover after Epsom. After a break of two and a half months, Shahtoush returned in the Yorkshire Oaks at York in August. After briefly challenging the leaders she weakened and finished a remote fifth of the six runners behind the unbeaten Catchascatchcan, having been eased down in the closing stages by Kinane, who reported that the filly was unsuited by the firm ground. On her final appearance, Shahtoush raced against colts for the first time in the Irish Champion Stakes at Leopardstown in September. Ridden by Seamie Heffernan, she was never in serious contention and finished last of the eight runners behind Swain, ending her racing career with two consecutive defeats.

== Assessment and honours ==
The independent Timeform organisation gave Shahtoush a rating of 120.

In their book, A Century of Champions, based on the Timeform rating system, John Randall and Tony Morris rated Shahtoush an "inferior" winner of the Oaks.

== Stud record ==
Shahtoush was retired to become a broodmare for the Coolmore Stud. Her record at stud was disappointing, with only one minor winner, a filly sired by Danehill named Satine.

Foals

- 2000 SATINE (IRE): Bay filly, foaled 6 January, by Danehill (USA) – won 1 race and placed twice; 4th G3 1000 Guineas Trial S, Leopardstown; 4th LR Ruby S, Tralee from 13 starts in Ireland
- 2002 SEA OF MOYLE (IRE): Chesnut colt (gelded), foaled 28 January, by Giant's Causeway (USA) – unplaced in 2 starts on the flat in Ireland 2005 and three starts over hurdles in Ireland 2007
- 2006 CUSTODY (IRE): Bay colt (gelded), foaled 21 January, by Fusaichi Pegasus (USA) – placed five times from 9 starts in England 2008-9
- 2007 SWEET DREAMS BABY (IRE): Bay filly, foaled 22 February, by Montjeu (IRE) – unraced, dam of winner Roxy Star (IRE) (2012, by Fastnet Rock <AUS>)

== Pedigree ==
Pedigree of Shahtoush (IRE), bay mare, 1995
Sire Alzao (USA) 1980	Lyphard; 1969	Northern Dancer	Nearctic
Sire Alzao (USA) 1980	Lyphard; 1969	Northern Dancer	Natalma
Sire Alzao (USA) 1980	Lyphard; 1969	Goofed	Court Martial
Sire Alzao (USA) 1980	Lyphard; 1969	Goofed	Barra
Sire Alzao (USA) 1980	Lady Rebecca; 1971	Sir Ivor	Sir Gaylord
Sire Alzao (USA) 1980	Lady Rebecca; 1971	Sir Ivor	Attica
Sire Alzao (USA) 1980	Lady Rebecca; 1971	Pocahontas	Roman
Sire Alzao (USA) 1980	Lady Rebecca; 1971	Pocahontas	How
Dam Formulate (GB) 1976	Reform; 1964	Pall Mall	Palestine
Dam Formulate (GB) 1976	Reform; 1964	Pall Mall	Malapert
Dam Formulate (GB) 1976	Reform; 1964	Country House	Vieux Manoir
Dam Formulate (GB) 1976	Reform; 1964	Country House	Miss Coventry
Dam Formulate (GB) 1976	Tabulator; 1963	Never Say Die	Nasrullah
Dam Formulate (GB) 1976	Tabulator; 1963	Never Say Die	Singing Grass
Dam Formulate (GB) 1976	Tabulator; 1963	Two Fold	Hyperion
Dam Formulate (GB) 1976	Tabulator; 1963	Two Fold	Duplicity (Family: 2-i)
