= Catchascatchcan =

British-bred Thoroughbred racehorse

- Sire: Pursuit of Love
- Grandsire: Groom Dancer
- Dam: Catawba
- Damsire: Mill Reef
- Sex: Mare
- Foaled: February 4, 1995 (age 31)
- Country: United Kingdom
- Colour: Bay
- Breeder: Lord Howard de Walden
- Owner: Lord Howard de Walden
- Trainer: Henry Cecil
- Record: 4: 4-0-0
- Earnings: £131,130

Major wins
- Lancashire Oaks (1998); Aphrodite Stakes (1998); Yorkshire Oaks (1998)

Awards
- Timeform rating 122 (1998)

Catchascatchcan (foaled 4 February 1995) was an undefeated British Thoroughbred racehorse and broodmare. Owned and bred Lord Howard de Walden and trained by Henry Cecil she was unraced as a juvenile before winning a maiden race on her first appearance. She went on to win the Lancashire Oaks and the Aphrodite Stakes and recorded her biggest success in the Yorkshire Oaks before her career was ended by injury. Since retiring from the racecourse she has had some success as a dam of winners.

== Background ==
Catchascatchcan is a "tall, leggy, angular" bay mare with a white star bred at the Plantation Stud by her owner Lord Howard de Walden who also bred and raced both of her parents. She was sired by Pursuit of Love who produced his best form over sprint distances as a three-year-old in 1992, winning the Prix Maurice de Gheest and finishing second to Mr Brooks in the July Cup. The best of his other offspring included the Cupid's Glory (winner of the Horris Hill Stakes), Palace Affair (Sprint Stakes, Summer Stakes), Love Everlasting (Princess Royal Stakes) and Tartouche (Lillie Langtry Stakes). Pursuit of Love died in 2008 at Throckmorton Court Stud after fracturing a fetlock.

Her dam Catawba recorded her only success in the 1988 running of the Middleton Stakes and was a daughter of the Ribblesdale Stakes winner Catalpa. Other horses descended from Catalpa's grandmother Malcomia have included Bellypha, Triscay (AJC Oaks, Queensland Oaks) and Oncidium (Coronation Cup).

Like many of Lord Howard de Walden's racehorses, Catchascatchcan was trained by Henry Cecil at his Warren Place stable at Newmarket, Suffolk.

== Racing career ==
=== 1998: three-year-old season ===
Catchascatchcan began her racing career on 10 June 1998 when she contested a maiden race over heavy ground at Kempton Park Racecourse. Ridden by Kieren Fallon she started 7/4 favourite against ten opponents and won by seven lengths after taking the lead a furlong from the finish.

The filly was then moved up sharply in class for the Group Three Lancashire Oaks at Haydock Park on 4 July. She was the 8/1 fifth choice in the six-runner field and was ridden by Willie Ryan as Fallon rode the Cecil stable's more favoured Silver Rhapsody. The Luca Cumani-trained Altaweelah was made favourite ahead of Rambling Rose (third in the Ribblesdale Stakes), Silver Rhapsody and Leggera (runner-up in the Preis der Diana) and the Park Hill Stakes winner Book At Bedtime. Ryan restrained the filly towards the rear as Book At Bedtime set the pace, but began to make progress in the straight. She overtook the leader Rambling Rose approaching the final furlong and won by a length, with Silver Rhapsody taking third ahead of Leggera. Cecil said that he was "very pleased by the way she won".

Catchascatchcan contested the Listed Aphrodite Stakes at Newmarket Racecourse two weeks later and started favourite despite carrying a five-pound weight penalty for her Haydock win. After being held up by Ryan in the early stages she took the lead inside the final furlong and won by three quarters of a length from Tuning and Kadaka who dead-heated for second. The other three runners finished virtually tailed-off.

Fallon resumed his partnership with Catchascatchcan when the filly was moved up to Group One level for the Yorkshire Oaks at York Racecourse on 19 August. Henry Cecil had considered withdrawing the filly because of the firm ground but allowed her to run. Before the race Lord Howard de Walden commented on Cecil's somewhat uncommunicative approach, saying "Oh, Henry doesn't tell you anything, but he's not the worst. I never heard a thing about her last year. Then he began to talk a bit and the filly seems to keep improving. She will have to improve again today". She was made the 2/1 favourite ahead of The Oaks winner Shahtoush, with the other four runners being Crown of Light (third in the Epsom Oaks and Yorkshire Oaks in 1997), High and Low (Cheshire Oaks), Cloud Castle (Nell Gwyn Stakes) and Lady In Waiting (Empress Stakes). The filly raced close behind the leaders as High and Low set the pace. She began to make progress early in the long York straight, took the lead two furlongs out and went clear of her opponents. Despite hanging to the left in the closing stages she won by two lengths from High and Low with Cloud Castle a further two lengths back in third. The racecourse stewards held an inquiry into possible interference between the winner and the runner-up but allowed the result to stand. Cecil said that the filly had hung towards the rail on account of the firm ground, whilst Fallon claimed that Darryll Holland on High and Low had exaggerated the level of interference.

Less than after her win at York, it was announced that the filly had sustained a hairline fracture of the knee in the race and that her racing career was over. Leslie Harrison, the manager of Lord Howard de Walden's Plantation Stud said "The injury must have happened during the race. She still trots sound but the knee does not flex well. So, after careful consideration, it's been decided to retire her. It's very sad, but at least the injury didn't happen before the Yorkshire Oaks. We did think about keeping her in training next year but who's to say the injury won't recur?".

== Breeding record ==
Catchascatchcan was retired from racing to become a broodmare at the Plantation Stud. The mare was offered for sale at Keeneland in November 2000 and was bought for $4.7 million by representatives of the Irish businessman Tony Ryan, the founder of Ryanair.

- Antonius Pius, a bay colt, foaled in 2001, sired by Danzig. Won two races including the Railway Stakes and finished second in the Breeders' Cup Mile.
- Princess Zara, bay filly, 2002, by A.P. Indy. Unraced.
- Catch the Blue Hat, chestnut filly, 2003, by Storm Cat. Failed to win in two races.
- L'Impresario, bay colt, 2006, by Bernstein. Won his only race.
- Catchup If You Can, bay filly, 2007, by Bernstein. Unraced.
- Equus Prime, bay colt, 2010, by Dynaformer. Sold for $550,000 as a yearling but failed to win in four races.
- Songoficeandfire, bay filly, 2011, by Dynaformer. Won two races.
- Hold Me Now, filly, 2012, by Bernstein

== Pedigree ==
Pedigree of Catchascatchcan (GB), bay mare, 1995
Sire Pursuit of Love (GB) 1989	Groom Dancer (IRE); 1984	Blushing Groom	Red God
Sire Pursuit of Love (GB) 1989	Groom Dancer (IRE); 1984	Blushing Groom	Runaway Bride
Sire Pursuit of Love (GB) 1989	Groom Dancer (IRE); 1984	Featherhill	Lyphard
Sire Pursuit of Love (GB) 1989	Groom Dancer (IRE); 1984	Featherhill	Lady Berry
Sire Pursuit of Love (GB) 1989	Dance Quest (FR); 1981	Green Dancer	Nijinsky
Sire Pursuit of Love (GB) 1989	Dance Quest (FR); 1981	Green Dancer	Green Valley
Sire Pursuit of Love (GB) 1989	Dance Quest (FR); 1981	Polyponder	Barbizon
Sire Pursuit of Love (GB) 1989	Dance Quest (FR); 1981	Polyponder	Second Thought
Dam Catawba (GB) 1985	Mill Reef (USA); 1968	Never Bend	Nasrullah
Dam Catawba (GB) 1985	Mill Reef (USA); 1968	Never Bend	Lalun
Dam Catawba (GB) 1985	Mill Reef (USA); 1968	Milan Mill	Princequillo
Dam Catawba (GB) 1985	Mill Reef (USA); 1968	Milan Mill	Virginia Water
Dam Catawba (GB) 1985	Catalpa (GB); 1973	Reform	Pall Mall
Dam Catawba (GB) 1985	Catalpa (GB); 1973	Reform	Country House
Dam Catawba (GB) 1985	Catalpa (GB); 1973	Ostrya	Hornbeam
Dam Catawba (GB) 1985	Catalpa (GB); 1973	Ostrya	Malcolmia (Family: 16-b)

== See also ==
- List of Undefeated horses
