= Song of Wind =

Japanese-bred racehorse (2003–2024)

Song of Wind ソングオブウインド
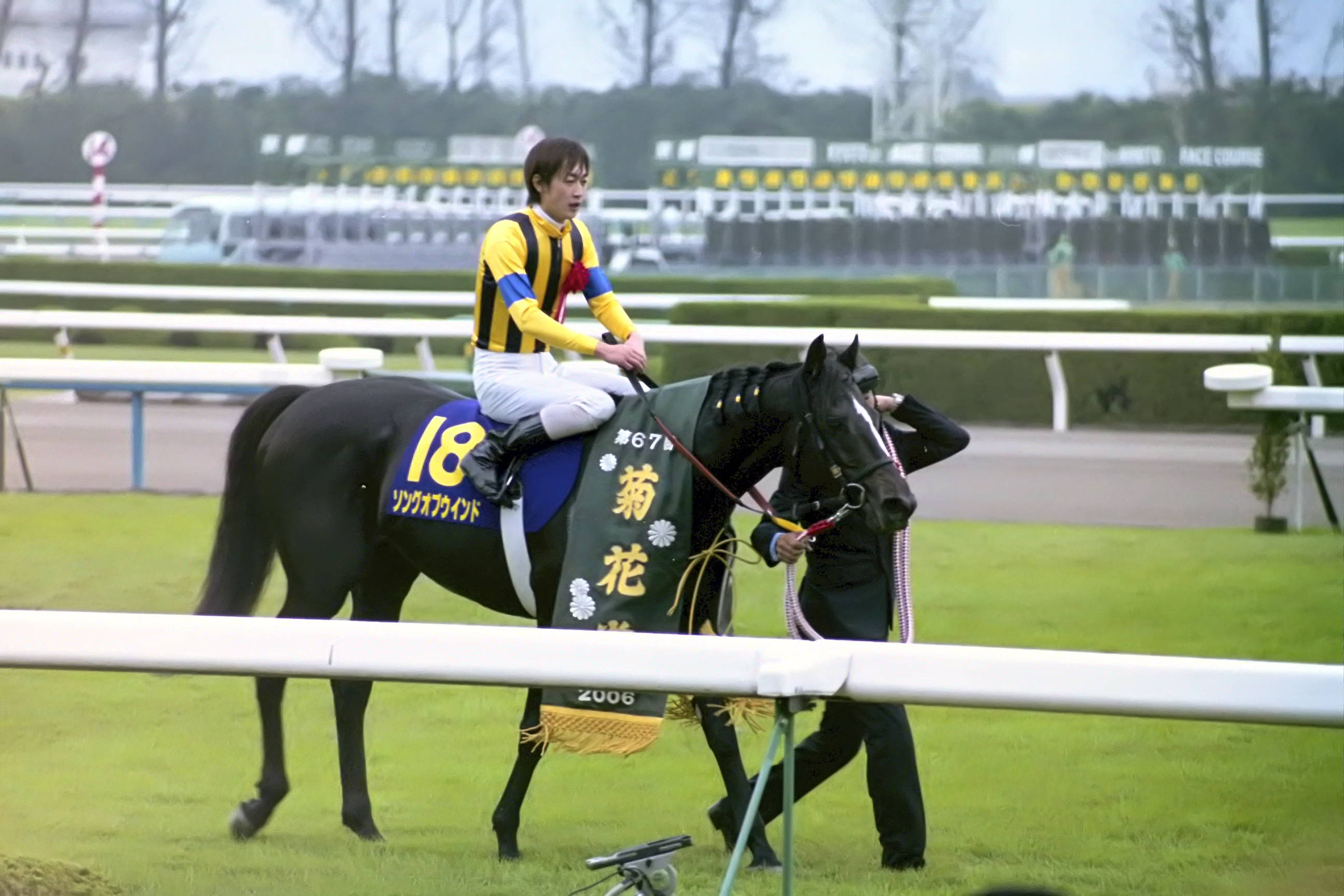
- Song of Wind after winning the 2006 Kikuka Sho
- Sire: El Condor Pasa
- Grandsire: Kingmambo
- Dam: Memorial Summer
- Damsire: Sunday Silence
- Sex: Stallion
- Foaled: 14 January 2003
- Country: Japan
- Colour: Dark bay/Brown
- Breeder: Oiwake Farm
- Owner: Shadai Race Horse Co.
- Racing colours
- Trainer: Hidekazu Asami
- Jockey: Koshiro Take
- Record: 11: 3-4-3
- Earnings: 207,438,000 JPY; 800,000 HKD

Major wins
- Japanese Classic Race wins: Kikuka Sho (2006)
- Last updated on 7 July 2026

Song of Wind (Japanese: ソングオブウインド; Hepburn: Song uo Būindo; foaled 14 January 2003) is a retired Japanese racehorse and a sire. He won the only graded stakes in his career at the 2006 Kikuka Sho as an eighth favourite. He had eleven starts in one season of his career, including a race in the Hong Kong Vase at the end of year where he finished outside of podium for the first time and had to retired from racing due to tendon injury at the right front leg.

== Background ==
Song of Wind was foaled out of Memorial Summer, a mare that had 2 wins in 10 starts who was sired by Sunday Silence. He was sired by El Condor Pasa, who was the Japanese Horse of the Year in 1999 and finished second at the Prix de l'Arc de Triomphe in the same year.

He was owned by Shadai Race Horse Co. at the price of 22,000,000 JPY (with 55,000 JPY per shares x 40 units). His name mainly derived from his dam's name which evoked the image of a cool breeze blowing across a summer beach. This is also a name of Haruki Murakami first novel - Hear the Wind Sing.

== Racing career ==
=== 2006: three-year-old season ===
Song of Wind made his debut on 29 January in 1800 meter dirt maiden race at Kyoto Racecourse, in which he finished one-and-a-quarter length behind Shirokita Vega under the reins of Yutaka Take. He continued to race for two more times under Yutaka Take where he only placed third in both succeeded races. At his fourth race, Yutaka Take would be replaced by his brother, Koshiro Take. Sticking to dirt since debut, Song of Wind improved a bit in the fourth race but still unable to win where he finished in second by one-and-a-quarter length behind Sammy Desert. Finally, in his fifth career race, Song of Wind won for the first time when he surged forward from fifth position to the lead at the final bend and maintained it until the finish line. He won the race by half-a-lengths over Hatano Sting.

Then, Song of Wind made a switch to the turf track and his result was excellent for the new track debut as he finished in second place by one-and-a-quarter length behind Solid Platinum. In his next race at the Natsukodachi Sho, he would be ridden by another jockey which was Hiroshi Kitamura. As the race started, Kitamura calmed and controlled him at the middle to rear of the pack during the race. At the final straight, He propelled him through and overtook the seventh favourite, Sakura Majesty to win the race by one length. In July, he ran in his first graded stakes races which was the Nikkei Sho. This time around, he would be jockeyed by Katsuharu Tanaka. In the race, Song of Wind made a late charge at the end phase but only finished in second place, two lengths behind Tamamo Support who mingled in the lead pack from the start.

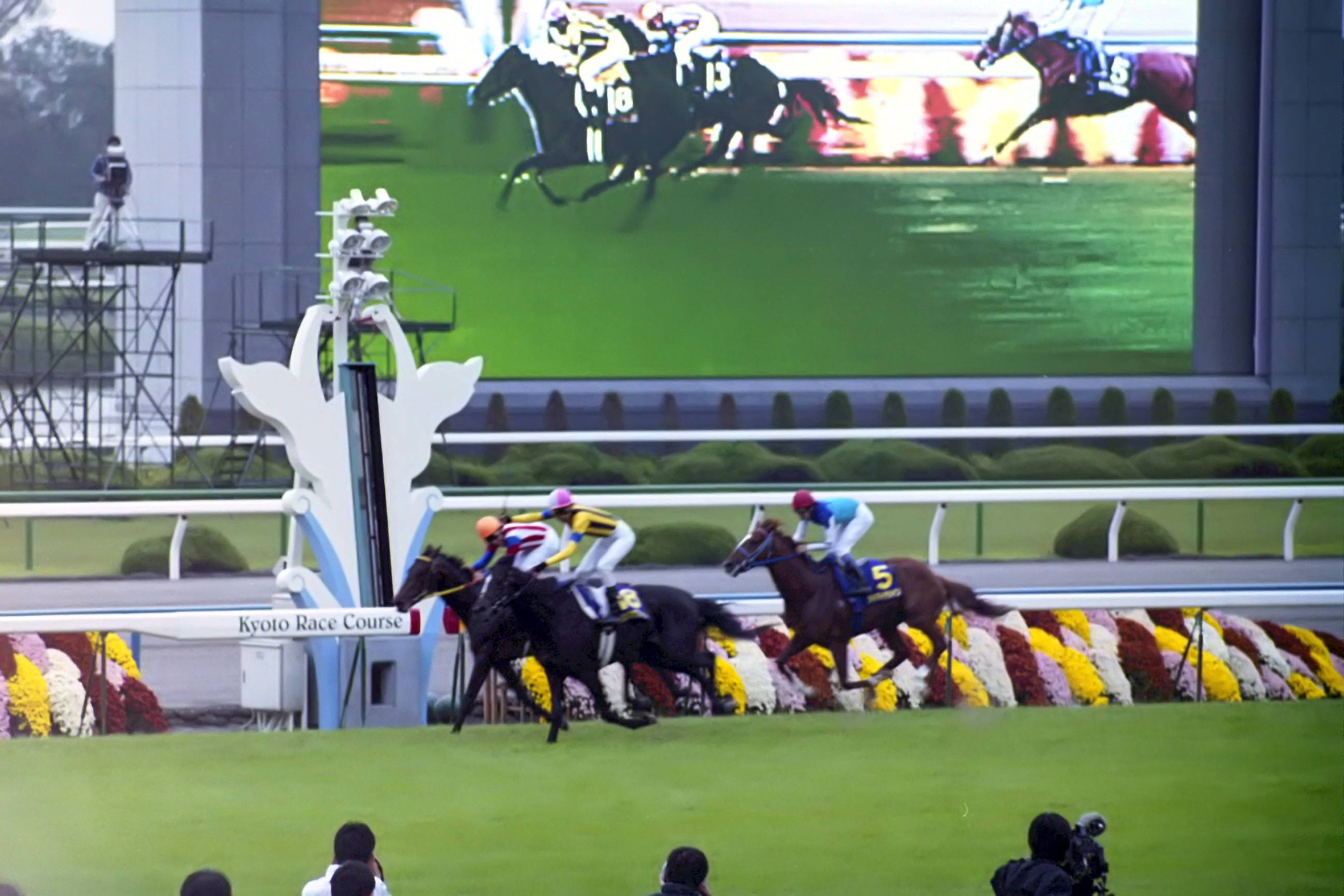
Song of Wind reached the finish line first at the 2006 Kikuka Sho.

At the beginning of the autumn campaign, Song of Wind was registered to run on dirt once again at the Derby Grand Prix. This plan was halted as he and Fusaichi Richard withdrawn from the race and opted for the Kobe Shimbun Hai, the trial for the Kikuka Sho instead. In this race, Koshiro Take made a return as his jockey where he placed third half length behind Dream Passport and Meisho Samson. Song of Wind's third place finish secured him the entry for the Kikuka Sho in October. It was determined that Koshiro Take who stuck with the horse would be launched from the outermost gate 18. When the gates opened, Admire Main setting a fast pace at the lead with over ten lengths ahead of the rest of the field and passing the 1000 metres mark in under 58 seconds. Meisho Samson was in 3rd or 4th place, Dream Passport was in 7th or 8th place slightly ahead of the middle of the pack, and Song of Wind was in 3rd place from the rear. Despite the pace of the race getting slower, Admire Main kept the lead by five lengths ahead into the straight. Dream Passport, who moved to the outside at the start of the straight started to pursue Admire Main. Meanwhile, Song of Wind came from further back at 16th position, going even wider. At the final 50 metres, the duo caught up with Admire Main and had a drag race to the line and finished the race sides-by-sides in a photo finish manner. The final verdict was given as Song of Wind edged the duel and won by a neck over Dream Passport, whilst Admire Main got third. Meisho Samson who was chasing the triple crown accelerated earlier and moved up temporarily on second position but fell down the order due to lack of pace and finished fourth, thus failed to win the third leg. When the race over, Koshiro Take commented:

"I'm just so happy. I focused on keeping him (Song of Wind) settled. I kept him calm and in his own rhythm. I held on until the downhill and he made a fantastic burst of speed at the end. His response was outstanding."

This is the first classic win for the trainer, Asami and the jockey, Koshiro Take. Song of Wind finished this race in a record time of 3:02.7, beating the previous record of 3:03.02 that was set up by Seiun Sky in 1998. This time held on until 2014 when Toho Jackal broke it by 1.7 seconds quicker at 3:01.0. For the final race of the season, he would went on an oversea trip as he joined the Hong Kong Vase in December. The race turned out to be hectic as both Admire Main and Song of Wind involved in unnecessary blockage due to imbalance of a horse that caused a bit of a delay in the pack. Song of Wind finished fourth on the day whilst Admire Main placed eighth. Koshiro Take remarked after the race:

"I rode the race with the intention of winning. There were few horses, so it was a smooth race. I thought I had won at the fourth corner, but at the end, after changing leads, it felt like he (Song of Wind) was braking a little on his own. It didn't feel like he was running at his maximum. However, he was in good condition for the race, and I still think he's a horse that can run."

Post race examination showed that Admire Main did not suffer any injuries but unfortunately for Song of Wind, it was discovered that he suffered a tendon injury at his right front leg. The injury then was confirmed to be tendonitis, which signifying the end of the racehorse career for Song of Wind. He would be deregistered from race directories and moved to stud at Shadai Stallion Station in Urakawa, Hokkaido.

== Racing form ==
Song of Wind won three races and snatched seven podiums out of 11 starts. This data is available based on JBIS, netkeiba and HKJC.

Date	Track	Race	Grade	Distance (Condition)	Entry	HN	Odds (Favored)	Finish	Time	Margins	Jockey	Winner (Runner-up)
2006 – three-year-old season
Jan 29	Kyoto	3yo Newcomer		1,800 m (Fast)	13	5	2.0 (1)	2nd	1:54.5	0.2	Yutaka Take	Shirokita Vega
Feb 18	Kyoto	3yo Maiden		1,800 m (Good)	16	4	1.2 (1)	3rd	1:54.3	0.3	Yutaka Take	Meisho Shaft
Mar 12	Hanshin	3yo Maiden		1,800 m (Muddy)	14	9	2.1 (1)	3rd	1:56.4	0.6	Yutaka Take	Perfect Run
Mar 26	Hanshin	3yo Maiden		1,400 m (Fast)	14	3	1.5 (1)	2nd	1:27.0	0.2	Koshiro Take	Sammy Desert
Apr 9	Nakayama	3yo Maiden		1,800 m (Fast)	11	1	1.5 (1)	1st	1:57.7	–0.1	Koshiro Take	(Hatano Sting)
Apr 29	Kyoto	3yo Allowance	1W	1,800 m (Firm)	14	5	14.0 (5)	2nd	1:48.0	0.2	Koshiro Take	Solid Platinum
May 13	Tokyo	Natsukodachi Sho (ALW)	1W	2,000 m (Firm)	13	6	6.2 (2)	1st	2:01.7	–0.2	Hiroshi Kitamura	(Sakura Majesty)
Jul 2	Fukushima	Radio Nikkei Sho	3	1,800 m (Soft)	16	10	5.5 (2)	2nd	1:50.8	0.3	Katsuharu Tanaka	Tamamo Support
Sep 24	Chukyo	Kobe Shimbun Hai	2	2,000 m (Firm)	16	11	42.3 (6)	3rd	1:58.2	0.1	Koshiro Take	Dream Passport
Oct 22	Kyoto	Kikuka Sho	1	3,000 m (Firm)	18	18	44.2 (8)	1st	R3:02.7	0.0	Koshiro Take	(Dream Passport)
Dec 10	Sha Tin	Hong Kong Vase	1	2,400 m (Firm)	9	5	4.5 (2)	4th	2:27.3	0.2	Koshiro Take	Collier Hill

Legend:
Turf Dirt

- R indicated that it was a record time finish

== Stud career and retirement ==
As a stud, Song of Wind was unable to produce a graded stakes winner. The best finish his progeny able to get was the third place at the Hanshin Juvenile Fillies by Rice Terrace. In his whole career as a stud from 2007–2014, Song of Wind bred with 536 mares, produced 347 progenies, registered 327 of the bunch, earned a total of 1,377,120,500 JPY with AEI of 0.37.

When he retired as a stud, he was moved from Yushun Stallion Station to Oiwake Farm to lived out the rest of his life.

== Pedigree ==
Pedigree of Song of Wind (JPN)
Sire El Condor Pasa (USA) 1995 dkb/br.	Kingmambo (USA); 1990 b.	Mr. Prospector	Raise a Native
Sire El Condor Pasa (USA) 1995 dkb/br.	Kingmambo (USA); 1990 b.	Mr. Prospector	Gold Digger
Sire El Condor Pasa (USA) 1995 dkb/br.	Kingmambo (USA); 1990 b.	Miesque	Nureyev
Sire El Condor Pasa (USA) 1995 dkb/br.	Kingmambo (USA); 1990 b.	Miesque	Pasadoble
Sire El Condor Pasa (USA) 1995 dkb/br.	Saddlers Gal (IRE); 1989 b.	Sadler's Wells	Northern Dancer
Sire El Condor Pasa (USA) 1995 dkb/br.	Saddlers Gal (IRE); 1989 b.	Sadler's Wells	Fairy Bridge
Sire El Condor Pasa (USA) 1995 dkb/br.	Saddlers Gal (IRE); 1989 b.	Glenveagh	Seattle Slew
Sire El Condor Pasa (USA) 1995 dkb/br.	Saddlers Gal (IRE); 1989 b.	Glenveagh	Lisadell
Dam Memorial Summer (JPN) 1998 blk. F.no: 9-f	Sunday Silence (USA); 1986 dkb/br.	Halo	Hail To Reason
Dam Memorial Summer (JPN) 1998 blk. F.no: 9-f	Sunday Silence (USA); 1986 dkb/br.	Halo	Cosmah
Dam Memorial Summer (JPN) 1998 blk. F.no: 9-f	Sunday Silence (USA); 1986 dkb/br.	Wishing Well	Understanding
Dam Memorial Summer (JPN) 1998 blk. F.no: 9-f	Sunday Silence (USA); 1986 dkb/br.	Wishing Well	Mountain Flower
Dam Memorial Summer (JPN) 1998 blk. F.no: 9-f	Summer Wine (JPN); 1990 dkb/br.	Tony Bin	Kampala
Dam Memorial Summer (JPN) 1998 blk. F.no: 9-f	Summer Wine (JPN); 1990 dkb/br.	Tony Bin	Severn Bridge
Dam Memorial Summer (JPN) 1998 blk. F.no: 9-f	Summer Wine (JPN); 1990 dkb/br.	Shadai Mine	Hitting Away
Dam Memorial Summer (JPN) 1998 blk. F.no: 9-f	Summer Wine (JPN); 1990 dkb/br.	Shadai Mine	Fancimine

- Song of Wind was an inbred by 4 x 5 to Northern Dancer (Nureyev)'s sire) and 5 x 5 to Special (Nureyev's and Fairy Bridge's dam).
