= Leggera (horse) =

Irish-bred Thoroughbred racehorse

- Sire: Sadler's Wells
- Grandsire: Northern Dancer
- Dam: Lady Ambassador
- Damsire: General Assembly
- Sex: Mare
- Foaled: 15 February 1995
- Country: Ireland
- Colour: Bay
- Breeder: Hildegard Focke
- Owner: Hildegard Focke
- Trainer: John Dunlop
- Record: 15: 5-3-1
- Earnings: £395,174

Major wins
- Prix Saraca (1997); Prix de Pomone (1998); Prix Vermeille (1998); Doonside Cup (1999)

Leggera (foaled 15 February 1995) was an Irish-bred, British-trained Thoroughbred racehorse and broodmare who produced her best performances in France. As a juvenile, she won two of her four starts including the Listed Prix Saraca on her final start. In the following year she ran well without winning in the early part of the year before taking the Group 2 Prix de Pomone and the Group 1 Prix Vermeille and then produced a career-best performance when running a close second in the Prix de l'Arc de Triomphe. She was not as successful in 1998 when she won the Doonside Cup in Scotland and finished fourth in her second attempt at Arc de Triomphe. She had no success as a broodmare.

== Background ==
Leggera was a bay mare bred with no white markings in Ireland by her owner Hildegard Focke. She was trained throughout her racing career by John Dunlop at Arundel in West Sussex.

She was from the tenth crop of foals sired by Sadler's Wells, who won the Irish 2000 Guineas, Eclipse Stakes and Irish Champion Stakes in 1984 went on to be the Champion sire on fourteen occasions. Her dam, Lady Ambassador was a speedy racemare who won four races in Ireland over sprint distances and went to produce the John Porter Stakes winner Lucido. Her dam, Gertrude Lawrence, was an unraced daughter of the successful racehorse and broodmare Sarah Siddons.

== Racing career ==
=== 1997: two-year-old season ===
Leggera made her racecourse debut in a maiden race over seven furlongs at Sandown Park on 14 August in which she was ridden by Tim Sprake and started a 25/1 outsider in a thirteen-runner field. After starting slowly she produced a strong late run, took the lead inside the final furlong, and won by one and a quarter lengths from the Michael Stoute-trained Alignment. On 10 September the filly started favourite for a minor race at Kempton Park Racecourse but looked short of finishing pace as she came home third behind Exclusive. In the Radley Stakes at Newbury Racecourse on 25 October she stayed on strongly in the closing stages to finish third behind Ffestiniog and Amabel. On 12 November Leggera was sent to France for the Listed Prix Saraca at Maisons-Laffitte Racecourse over 1600 metres. Partnered by Olivier Peslier she took the lead in the closing stages and won by half a length from Queen Catherine.

=== 1998: three-year-old season ===
On her three-year-old debut Leggera contested the Pretty Polly Stakes over ten furlongs at Newmarket Racecourse at Newmarket Racecourse on 3 May and finished second to the Henry Cecil-trained Midnight Line. She was then sent to Germany and ran second to Elle Danzig in the Preis der Diana on 1 June before returning to England and coming home fourth behind Catchascatchcan, Rambling Rose and Silver Rhapsody in Lancashire Oaks at Haydock Park in July. On 2 August the filly was sent to France to contest the Group 2 Prix de Pomone over 2700metres at Deauville in which she was ridden by Olivier Doleuze and started the 11/1 outsider in a six-runner field. Another Dancer, the winner of the Prix de Malleret) started favourite while the other contenders included Rambling Rose and the Prix Corrida winner Lexa. After racing in third place, Leggera took the lead 400 metres from the finish and steadily increased her advantage in the closing stages to win by five lengths.

On 13 September Leggera was stepped up to Group 1 class for the first time when she was partnered by Richard Quinn) in the Prix Vermeille over 2400 metres at Longchamp Racecourse and started at odds of 10/1 in an eleven-runner field. The undefeated Prix de Diane winner Zainta started the 9/10 favourite while the other runners included Winona, Bahr (Ribblesdale Stakes), Cantilever (Prix de Royaumont), Isle de France (Prix Minerve) and Cloud Castle (Nell Gwyn Stakes). Leggera was among the leaders from the start, went to the front 600 metres from the finish and stayed on strongly to win by three quarters of a length from Cloud Castle with Zainta a head away in third.

Three weeks after her win in the Vermeille Leggera returned to Longchamp for Europe's most prestigious weight-for-age race, the Prix de l'Arc de Triomphe and with Quinn in the saddle, she started at odds of 15.5/1 in a fourteen-runner field. he had not been among the original entries for the race, meaning that her owner had to pay a supplementary entry fee. After racing for most of the way in fourth place she took the lead in the straight and fought off a challenge from the German challenger winner Tiger Hill, but was caught in the final strides and beaten a neck by the French colt Sagamix. After the race Dunlop said "What an improved filly! I thought it was a good run from her to win the Vermeille, but she has beaten three Derby winners today. She was only just beaten in the last 50 yards, but that is where it matters. Another day's rain might have made the difference".

For her final run of the year, the filly was sent to the United States to contest the Breeders' Cup Turf at Churchill Downs but ran poorly and came home twelfth of the thirteen runners behind Buck's Boy.

=== 1999: four-year-old season ===
Richard Quinn rode Leggera in all four of her races in 1999. On her first run of the year the filly started favourite for the Prix Jean de Chaudenay over 2400 metres at Saint-Cloud Racecourse on 14 May but after racing in second place she faded badly in the straight and came home last of the five runners behind Public Purse. She was off the track for almost four months before returning in the Doonside Cup at Ayr Racecourse in September and was made the 6/4 favourite, with the best-fancied of her six opponents being Largesse (winner of the race in the previous year) and Carry The Flag (Rosebery Stakes). Quinn sent Leggera into the lead approaching the final furlong and she won by one and a half lengths from Carry The Flag. On 3 October Leggera ran for the second time in the Prix de l'Arc de Triomphe. She ran well without ever looking likely to win and came fourth behind Montjeu, El Condor Pasa and Croco Rouge with Tiger Hill, Daylami, Fantastic Light and Borgia finishing behind. On final appearance three weeks later she finished third to Amilynx when favourite for the Prix Royal-Oak but was disqualified as Quinn weighed in for the race half a kilo under the official weight. Dunlop paid tribute to the filly, saying "She's been a marvellous racehorse and always gives her all".

== Breeding record ==
Leggera was retired from racing at the end of her third season. According to one source, she produced four foals in Kentucky between 2002 and 2005, none of whom raced or were officially named.

== Pedigree ==
Pedigree of Leggera (IRE), bay mare, 1995
Sire Sadler's Wells (USA) 1981	Northern Dancer (CAN); 1961	Nearctic	Nearco (ITY)
Sire Sadler's Wells (USA) 1981	Northern Dancer (CAN); 1961	Nearctic	Lady Angela (GB)
Sire Sadler's Wells (USA) 1981	Northern Dancer (CAN); 1961	Natalma (USA)	Native Dancer
Sire Sadler's Wells (USA) 1981	Northern Dancer (CAN); 1961	Natalma (USA)	Almahmoud
Sire Sadler's Wells (USA) 1981	Fairy Bridge (USA); 1975	Bold Reason	Hail To Reason
Sire Sadler's Wells (USA) 1981	Fairy Bridge (USA); 1975	Bold Reason	Lalun
Sire Sadler's Wells (USA) 1981	Fairy Bridge (USA); 1975	Special	Forli (ARG)
Sire Sadler's Wells (USA) 1981	Fairy Bridge (USA); 1975	Special	Thong
Dam Lady Ambassador (GB) 1985	General Assembly (USA); 1976	Secretariat	Bold Ruler
Dam Lady Ambassador (GB) 1985	General Assembly (USA); 1976	Secretariat	Somethingroyal
Dam Lady Ambassador (GB) 1985	General Assembly (USA); 1976	Exclusive Dancer	Native Dancer
Dam Lady Ambassador (GB) 1985	General Assembly (USA); 1976	Exclusive Dancer	Exclusive
Dam Lady Ambassador (GB) 1985	Gertrude Lawrence (IRE); 1979	Ballymore	Ragusa
Dam Lady Ambassador (GB) 1985	Gertrude Lawrence (IRE); 1979	Ballymore	Paddy's Sister
Dam Lady Ambassador (GB) 1985	Gertrude Lawrence (IRE); 1979	Sarah Siddons (FR)	Le Levanstell
Dam Lady Ambassador (GB) 1985	Gertrude Lawrence (IRE); 1979	Sarah Siddons (FR)	Mariel (Family 9)
