= Sagamix =

French-bred Thoroughbred racehorse

- Racing colours of Jean-Luc Lagardère
- Sire: Linamix
- Grandsire: Mendez
- Dam: Saganeca
- Damsire: Sagace
- Sex: Stallion
- Foaled: 15 March 1995
- Country: France
- Colour: Grey
- Breeder: Jean-Luc Lagardère
- Owner: Jean-Luc Lagardère; Godolphin Racing
- Trainer: André Fabre; Saeed bin Suroor
- Record: 9: 4-0-1

Major wins
- Prix Niel (1998); Prix de l'Arc de Triomphe (1998)

Sagamix (foaled 15 March 1995) was a French Thoroughbred racehorse best known for winning the 1998 Prix de l'Arc de Triomphe.

== Background ==
Sagamix is a grey horse bred by his first owner Jean-Luc Lagardère. He inherited his grey coat from his sire Linamix, who won the Poule d'Essai des Poulains for Lagardere in 1990. Sagamix's dam, Saganeca, was a high class racemare who won the Prix de Royalieu in 1991. Sagamix was a dark-coated grey during his racing career, but lightened with age and in his stud career became almost white.

Lagardere sent his colt into training with André Fabre at Chantilly.

== Racing career ==
=== 1998: three-year-old season ===
Having been unraced as a two-year-old, Sagamix made his debut in the Prix Hippolyte over 2400 metres at Saint-Cloud Racecourse in March and won comfortably by three quarters of a length. A month later at Longchamp he won the Prix des Marronniers, beating Dream Well by a neck. Sagamix was off the course for almost five months after his win at Longchamp, but his form was boosted when Dream Well won both the Prix du Jockey Club and the Irish Derby.

Sagamix returned to the racecourse for the Prix Niel at Longchamp in September. His opponents included Dream Well and Croco Rouge, first and second in the Prix du Jockey Club and the Derby Italiano winner Central Park. Ridden by Olivier Peslier, Sagamix took the lead in the closing stages and won by one and a half lengths from Croco Rouge. In the Prix de l'Arc de Triomphe at Longchamp on 4 October, Sagamix started 5/2 favourite in a field of fourteen runners. Peslier held the colt up in the earlier stages before making his challenge in the straight. He took the lead in the closing stages to win by a neck from the British filly Leggera, with the German colt Tiger Hill in third.

=== 1999: four-year-old season ===
On his first appearance since his win in the Arc, Sagamix started odds-on favourite for the Prix Ganay in May 1999. He lost his unbeaten record as he finished fourth of the six runners behind Dark Moondancer. On his only other race of 1999 he finished fourth behind the Japanese challenger El Condor Pasa in the Grand Prix de Saint-Cloud in July. Later that year, he was bought by Godolphin Racing and sent to join the stable of Saeed bin Suroor.

=== 2000: five-year-old season ===
On his first appearance for Godolphin, Sagamix finished ninth of the sixteen runners behind Fantastic Light in the Dubai Sheema Classic, beaten seventeen lengths. His two remaining appearances were similarly disappointing. He finished last in the Coronation Cup at Epsom in June and third of the four runners behind Montjeu in the Grand Prix de Saint-Cloud a month later.

== Assessment ==
In their book "A Century of Champions", based on the Timeform rating system, John Randall and Tony Morris rated Sagamix an "inferior" Arc winner.

== Stud record ==
Sagamix has made little impact as a stallion of flat racers, but has had some success as a sire of jumpers. In 2012 he was standing at a stud fee of £1,500 at the Overbury stud in Gloucestershire.

== Pedigree ==
Pedigree of Sagamix (FR), grey, 1995
Sire Linamix (GB) 1987	Mendez; 1981	Bellypha	Lyphard
Sire Linamix (GB) 1987	Mendez; 1981	Bellypha	Belga
Sire Linamix (GB) 1987	Mendez; 1981	Miss Carina	Caro
Sire Linamix (GB) 1987	Mendez; 1981	Miss Carina	Miss Pia
Sire Linamix (GB) 1987	Lunadix; 1972	Breton	Relko
Sire Linamix (GB) 1987	Lunadix; 1972	Breton	La Melba
Sire Linamix (GB) 1987	Lunadix; 1972	Lutine	Alcide
Sire Linamix (GB) 1987	Lunadix; 1972	Lutine	Mona
Dam Saganeca (USA) 1988	Sagace; 1980	Luthier	Klairon
Dam Saganeca (USA) 1988	Sagace; 1980	Luthier	Flute Enchantee
Dam Saganeca (USA) 1988	Sagace; 1980	Seneca	Chaparral
Dam Saganeca (USA) 1988	Sagace; 1980	Seneca	Schonbrunn
Dam Saganeca (USA) 1988	Haglette; 1978	Hagley	Olden Times
Dam Saganeca (USA) 1988	Haglette; 1978	Hagley	Tio Pepi
Dam Saganeca (USA) 1988	Haglette; 1978	Sucrette	Zucchero
Dam Saganeca (USA) 1988	Haglette; 1978	Sucrette	Le Mirambule(Family: 11-d)
