= El Condor Pasa (horse) =

American-bred Thoroughbred racehorse

El Condor Pasa エルコンドルパサー
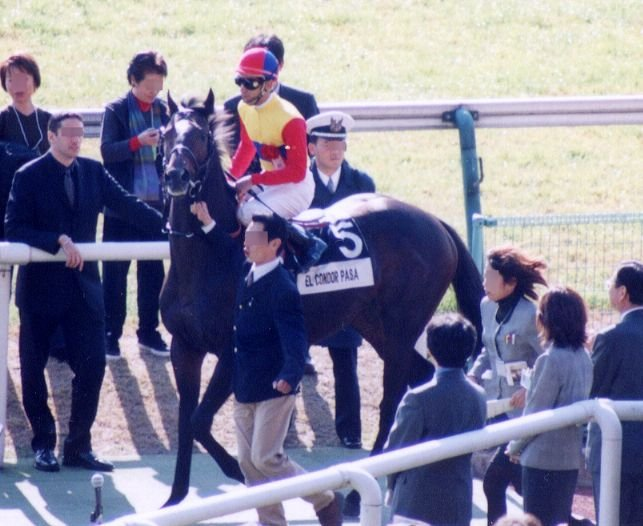
- El Condor Pasa on November 28, 1999.
- Breed: Thoroughbred
- Sire: Kingmambo (USA)
- Grandsire: Mr. Prospector (USA)
- Dam: Saddlers Gal (IRE)
- Damsire: Sadler's Wells (USA)
- Sex: Stallion
- Foaled: March 17, 1995
- Died: July 16, 2002 (aged 7)
- Country: United States
- Colour: Dark Bay
- Breeder: Takashi Watanabe
- Owner: Takashi Watanabe
- Racing colours
- Trainer: Yoshitaka Ninomiya
- Jockey: Hitoshi Matoba; Masayoshi Ebina
- Record: 11: 8-3-0
- Earnings: ¥453,000,800; JPN: ¥376,078,000 JPY; FR: 3,800,000 F

Major wins
- New Zealand Trophy (1998); NHK Mile Cup (1998); Japan Cup (1998); Grand Prix de Saint-Cloud (1999); Prix Foy (1999)

Awards
- Japanese Champion Three-year-old Colt (1998); Japanese Champion Older Horse (1999); Japanese Horse of the Year (1999)

Honours
- Japan Racing Association Hall of Fame (2014); Timeform rating: 136; WTRR rating : 134 (1999 Prix de l'Arc de Triomphe)

El Condor Pasa (Japanese: エルコンドルパサー, Hepburn: Eru Kondoru Pasā; March 17, 1995 – July 16, 2002) was an American-bred, Japanese-trained Thoroughbred racehorse and sire. He won eight of his eleven races, coming second in the other three. In 1998 he won the NHK Mile Cup and the Japan Cup. In the following year he was campaigned in Europe where he placed second at the Prix d'Ispahan and then won the Grand Prix de Saint-Cloud and the Prix Foy before finishing second in the 1999 Prix de l'Arc de Triomphe. After his tour in France, he retired at the end of 1999. He was retired to stud starting in 2000, but died after three seasons following unsuccessful colic surgery. During his time as a stud, he sired major winners Vermilion, Alondite, and Song of Wind. El Condor Pasa has been described as the best Japanese racehorse of the 20th century, holding the highest Timeform by a Japanese flat racing thoroughbred until Equinox matched it over 20 years later.

== Background ==
On March 17, 1995, Saddler's Gal gave birth to a colt, the future El Condor Pasa, at Lane's End Farm's Oak Tree Branch. When the colt was 4 months old, he was inspected by trainer Yoshitaka Ninomiya, who reported that he was a very ordinary horse. He was first brought to Japan in January 1996, when he was 10 months old, in order to begin training on Kimura farm. He was moved to the Miho training center in 1997 when he was two. The week of his debut, jockey Hitoshi Matoba rode El Condor Pasa during training, and was so impressed that he asked to be El Condor Pasa's jockey for his debut race.

El Condor Pasa was a dark bay horse with a large white star bred in Kentucky by his Japanese owner Takashi Watanabe. His sire, Kingmambo, was a highly successful breeding stallion. His progeny included the British Classic winners Light Shift, Russian Rhythm, King's Best, Henrythenavigator, Virginia Waters and Rule of Law as well as major winners in Japan, France (Divine Proportions) and the United States (Lemon Drop Kid). Watanabe sent the horse into training with Yoshi Ninomiya, who operated a small stable with only ten horses.

El Condor Pasa was named after the Peruvian musical play of the same name, as Watanabe had a peer in his alma mater (Keio University) that he respected that spent time in Peru; as well as expanding his sire's partial name (Mambo) to mean "South American music" in general. This was not the first horse Watanabe named "El Condor Pasa", as he owned another horse of the same name several years prior who suffered a fatal injury that required euthanization before he could make his debut.

== Racing career ==
El Condor Pasa made his debut as a two year old on November 8, 1997, in a 1600m dirt race at Tokyo Racecourse. This race was chosen by his trainer due to his belief that El Condor Pasa was not yet ready for a longer race on turf. He started as the favorite, tied with another American bred horse named Stealth Shot. Because El Condor Pasa had not practiced enough with the gate, he started significantly behind the other horses. Despite having such a bad start, he made his way from the back to the front by waiting in the back and then sprinting to the front on the entrance to the straight for a remarkable first win and his only win as a two year old.

In January 1998, El Condor Pasa had his second race on a 1800m dirt race at Nakayama Racecourse. He entered the race as the favorite. He started late, in the same way that he did in his debut. He and Matoba performed the same strategy and won once again in spite of his bad start. After this race, his trainer told Matoba that he would no longer be El Condor Pasa's jockey as El Condor Pasa would likely race against Grass Wonder, another horse that Matoba rode, in races soon. Matoba requested one more race with El Condor Pasa, saying that he did not trust another jockey to ride El Condor Pasa yet based on his maturity. Ninomiya agreed and granted Matoba one more race with El Condor Pasa.

He would win three more races after that, culminating in a win in the Group One NHK Mile Cup at Tokyo Racecourse on 17 May. After a summer break he returned in October and was tried beyond a mile for the first time, finishing second to Silence Suzuka in the Mainichi Okan. Despite losing his unbeaten record he started 5/1 third favourite for the Japan Cup over one and a half miles on 29 November. Ridden by Masayoshi Ebina, he took the lead in the straight and won by two and a half lengths over the mare Air Groove and the favourite Special Week. His win was enthusiastically received by the crowd of 146,879 and his trainer described the winner as "a hero... he has a huge heart".

In 1999, El Condor Pasa was sent to France where he was trained with the Prix de l'Arc de Triomphe as his objective. On his first European outing he finished second to Croco Rouge in the Prix d'Ispahan at Longchamp Racecourse in May. Two months later he faced opponents from France, Germany and Britain in the Grand Prix de Saint-Cloud. Ebina sent the colt into the lead in the straight and he drew clear to win by two and a half lengths from Tiger Hill and Dream Well, with Sagamix and Borgia among those unplaced. On his final trial for the Arc, he defeated Borgia and Croco Rouge in the Prix Foy at Longchamp in September. On 3 October, El Condor Pasa started the 18/5 second favourite for the Arc behind Montjeu, the three-year-old winner of both the Prix du Jockey Club and Irish Derby. El Condor Pasa led from the start and broke clear of the field in the straight to establish a three-length advantage. Montjeu emerged as his only challenger, and although El Condor Pasa rallied when the French colt drew alongside him, he was overtaken in the last hundred metres and beaten by half a length. The first two were six lengths clear of the third placed Croco Rouge.

== Assessment and honours ==
El Condor Pasa was named Japanese Champion Three-year-old Colt for 1998. Despite never running in Japan during the following year, El Condor Pasa's performances in France led to his being voted the 1999 Japanese Champion Older Horse and Japanese Horse of the Year.

In their book, A Century of Champions, based on the Timeform rating system, John Randall and Tony Morris rated El Condor Pasa the best racehorse trained in Japan in the 20th century.

== Stud record ==
El Condor Pasa was retired from racing to become a breeding stallion at the Shadai Stallion Station in Hokkaido. In July 2002, the horse became gravely ill with horse colic. El Condor Pasa underwent surgery but died at 9.10 p.m. on 16 July.

His three crops of foals contained several major winners including Vermilion (Japan Cup Dirt, February Stakes), Song of Wind (Kikuka Shō), Tokai Trick (Hanshin Daishoten) and Alondite (Japan Cup Dirt).

=== Notable progeny ===
c = colt, f = filly
bold: GI/JpnI grade winners

Grade winners
**Foaled**	**Name**	**Sex**	**Major Wins**
2001	Big Grass	c	Negishi Stakes
2002	I'll Love Again	c	Ocean Stakes
2002	Sakura Orion	c	Hakodate Kinen, Chukyo Kinen
2002	Tokai Trick	c	Diamond Stakes, Hanshin Daishoten, Stayers Stakes
2002	Vermilion	c	Radio Tampa Hai Nisai Stakes, Urawa Kinen, Diolite Kinen, Nagoya Grand Prix, **Kawasaki Kinen** (2x), **JBC Classic** (3x), **Teio Sho, Tokyo Daishoten, Japan Cup Dirt, February Stakes**
2003	Air Zipangu	c	Stayers Stakes
2003	Alondite	c	**Japan Cup Dirt**
2003	Rapid Orange	f	TCK Jo-o Hai
2003	Song of Wind	c	**Kikuka Sho**

== In popular culture ==
An anthropomorphized version of El Condor Pasa appears as a character in the Japanese multimedia franchise Umamusume: Pretty Derby, voiced by Minami Takahashi. She is depicted as a passionate and confident North American exchange student who is almost always seen wearing a luchador mask gifted to her by her father; without it, her personality dramatically shifts to a highly timid and meek one. She has a pet hawk named Mambo, a possible reference to her real-life counterpart's sire, Kingmambo, who she had since childhood and keeps with her despite Tracen Academy's ban on pets in their dormitories. She also carries a bottle of spicy hot sauce wherever she goes and puts it on all the food she eats, including natto, attracting the wrath of fellow North American exchange student and roommate Grass Wonder, who often scolds her for her recklessness.

In the Steel Ball Run arc of the anime and manga series JoJo's Bizarre Adventure, EI Condor Pasa is a 7-year-old Appaloosa ridden by minor antagonist Mrs. Robinson. Both the horse and the rider are named after the Peruvian folk song, "El Cóndor Pasa", with a cover by Simon & Garfunkel. The horse's name might also be in tribute to the real-life horse El Condor Pasa.

== Racing form ==
The following racing form is based on information available on JBIS search, netkeiba.com, and racingpost.com.

Date	Age	Distance (Condition)	Race	Class	Course	Field	Odds (Favored)	Finish	Time	Winning (Losing) Margin	Jockey	Winner (2nd Place)	Ref
Nov 8, 1997	2	Dirt 1600 m (Firm)	Two Year Old Debut		Tokyo	9	2.5 (1st)	1st	1:39.3	7 lengths	Hitoshi Matoba	(Mandarin Star)	
Jan 11, 1998	3	Dirt 1800 m (Heavy)	Three Year Old	1 Win	Nakayama	13	1.3 (1st)	1st	1:52.3	9 lengths	Hitoshi Matoba	(Taiho Unryu)	
Feb 15, 1998	3	Dirt 1600 m (Heavy)	Kyodo Tsushin Hai		Tokyo	9	1.2 (1st)	1st	1:36.9	2 lengths	Hitoshi Matoba	(Hyper Nakayama)	
Apr 26, 1998	3	Turf 1400 m (Soft)	New Zealand Trophy	GII	Tokyo	18	2.0 (1st)	1st	1:22.2	2 lengths	Hitoshi Matoba	(Sugino Cutie)	
May 17, 1998	3	Turf 1600 m (Good)	NHK Mile Cup	GI	Tokyo	17	1.8 (1st)	1st	1:33.7	1 3/4 lengths	Hitoshi Matoba	(Shinko Edward)	
Oct 11, 1998	3	Turf 1800 m (Firm)	Mainichi Okan	GII	Tokyo	9	5.3 (3rd)	2nd	1:45.3	(2 1/2 lengths)	Masayoshi Ebina	Silence Suzuka	
Nov 29, 1998	3	Turf 2400 m (Firm)	Japan Cup	GI	Tokyo	15	6.0 (3rd)	1st	2:25.9	2 1/2 lengths	Masayoshi Ebina	(Air Groove)	
May 23, 1999	4	Turf 1850 m (Good)	Prix d'Ispahan	GI	Longchamp	8	2.7 (1st)	2nd	1:53.9	(3/4 length)	Masayoshi Ebina	Croco Rouge	
Jul 4, 1999	4	Turf 2400 m (Good)	Grand Prix de Saint-Cloud	GI	Saint-Cloud	10	3.2 (2nd)	1st	2:28.8	2 1/2 lengths	Masayoshi Ebina	(Tiger Hill)	
Sep 12, 1999	4	Turf 2400 m (Good)	Prix Foy	GII	Longchamp	3	1.3 (1st)	1st	2:31.4	short neck	Masayoshi Ebina	(Borgia)	
Oct 3, 1999	4	Turf 2400 m (Heavy)	Prix de l'Arc de Triomphe	GI	Longchamp	14	4.6 (3rd)	2nd	2:38.6	(1/2 length)	Masayoshi Ebina	Montjeu	

== Pedigree ==
Pedigree of El Condor Pasa (USA)
Sire Kingmambo	Mr. Prospector	Raise a Native	Native Dancer
Sire Kingmambo	Mr. Prospector	Raise a Native	Raise You
Sire Kingmambo	Mr. Prospector	Gold Digger	Nashua
Sire Kingmambo	Mr. Prospector	Gold Digger	Sequence
Sire Kingmambo	Miesque	Nureyev	Northern Dancer
Sire Kingmambo	Miesque	Nureyev	Special
Sire Kingmambo	Miesque	Pasadoble	Prove Out
Sire Kingmambo	Miesque	Pasadoble	Santa Quilla
Dam Saddlers Gal	Sadler's Wells	Northern Dancer	Nearctic
Dam Saddlers Gal	Sadler's Wells	Northern Dancer	Natalma
Dam Saddlers Gal	Sadler's Wells	Fairy Bridge	Bold Reason
Dam Saddlers Gal	Sadler's Wells	Fairy Bridge	Special
Dam Saddlers Gal	Glenveagh	Seattle Slew	Bold Reasoning
Dam Saddlers Gal	Glenveagh	Seattle Slew	My Charmer
Dam Saddlers Gal	Glenveagh	Lisadell	Forli
Dam Saddlers Gal	Glenveagh	Lisadell	Thong (Family 5-h)

- El Condor Pasa was inbred 3 × 4 to the stallion Northern Dancer, meaning that Northern Dancer appears once in the third generation and once in the fourth generation of his pedigree.
