= North Stoke (horse) =

Irish-bred Thoroughbred racehorse

- Sire: Northfields
- Grandsire: Northern Dancer
- Dam: Mother
- Damsire: Whistler
- Sex: Stallion
- Foaled: 4 April 1974
- Country: Ireland
- Colour: Chestnut
- Owner: Mrs Marcel Lequieme
- Trainer: John Dunlop
- Record: 11: 8-0-2

Major wins
- Trafalgar House Stakes (1977); Bass Clubmans Handicap (1977); Grand Prix de Bruxelles (1977); Land of Burns Stakes (1977); Fürstenberg-Rennen (1977); Joe McGrath Memorial Stakes (1977)

Awards
- Timeform rating 105 (1976), 130 (1977)

North Stoke (4 April 1974 – 1979) was an Irish-bred, British-trained Thoroughbred racehorse and sire. He showed promise when winning two of his three races as a two-year-old in 1976. In the following year he was campaigned internationally and made consistent improvement to emerge as one of the leading middle-distance colts of the year with six consecutive victories. After two wins in handicap races in England he took the Grand Prix de Bruxelles in Belgium, the Land of Burns Stakes in Scotland, the Fürstenberg-Rennen in Germany and the Joe McGrath Memorial Stakes in Ireland. Despite a defeat in the Champion Stakes he was rated the best British-trained colt of his generation by Timeform. North Stoke had little opportunity to make his mark as a breeding stallion, dying after one season at stud.

== Background ==
North Stoke was a "rangy" chestnut horse with no white markings bred in Ireland. He was sired by Northfields, an American horse whose biggest win came in the Louisiana Derby in 1971, before spending most of his stud career in Europe. His other winners included Northjet, Oats, Northern Treasure and No Pass No Sale (Poule d'Essai des Poulains). North Stoke's dam, Mother, won over five furlongs as a two-year-old and went on to become a successful broodmare, producing at least three other winners including Anfield (Railway Stakes, Desmond Stakes). Mother was a great-granddaughter of Majideh, a very influential broodmare whose other descendants included Masaka, Gallant Man, Kahyasi, Lashkari, Law Society, Milan and Son of Love.

In October 1975 the yearling colt was offered for sale at Newmarket, Suffolk and was bought for 820 guineas by the bloodstock agent Geoffrey Howson who described the day of the sale as the best of his career. Commenting on the low price Timeform called it "the bargain of the year, possibly the bargain of many a year". He entered the ownership of Mr Marcel Lequieme and was sent into training with John Dunlop at Arundel, West Sussex. North Stoke was ridden in most of his races by the Australian jockey Ron Hutchinson who held a "very high opinion" of the colt.

== Racing career ==
=== 1976: two-year-old season ===
After finishing sixth on his racecourse debut, North Stoke won two races in the late autumn of 1976, both over seven furlongs. In October won a fifteen-runner minor race at Chepstow Racecourse, beating Miss Mars by one and a half lengths. In November at Lingfield Park Racecourse he defeated eighteen opponents in a similar event, coming home seven lengths clear of the runner-up Peace Symbol.

=== 1977: three-year-old season ===
After finishing third over one mile on his three-year-old debut, North Stoke ran the Trafalgar House Stakes over ten furlongs at Sandown Park Racecourse and won by fifteen lengths. In the Bass Clubmen's Handicap over a slightly longer distance at Haydock Park Racecourse he won "in a common canter" by three lengths. The colt was then sent to Belgium and won the Grand Prix de Bruxelles at Groenendael beating the French colt Silmador despite being eased down in the closing stages. He was then sent to Scotland for the Land of Burns Stakes over ten furlongs at Ayr Racecourse in which he was matched against stronger opposition including Tachypous, the winner of the Middle Park Stakes and runner-up in the 2000 Guineas. North Stoke moved alongside Tachypous a furlong from the finish and gained the advantage in the closing stages to win by three-quarters of a length, with the first two drawing well clear of the improving four-year-old Gunner B.

North Stoke contested his first Group race when he was sent to Germany for the Group Three Fürstenberg-Rennen over 2000 metres at Baden-Baden on 28 August. Ridden by Hutchinson he won by three lengths from La Tour, a colt who had finished ahead of Buckskin when running second in the Grosser Preis von Berlin. The colt was then sent to Ireland for the second running of the Group One Joe McGrath Memorial Stakes over ten furlongs at Leopardstown Racecourse on 24 September. He started the 5/4 favourite in an eleven-runner field which included Padroug (Futurity Stakes), Pollerton (Gordon Stakes), Sassabunda (runner-up in the Irish Oaks), Uncle Pokey and Captain James. North Stoke took the lead in the straight and drew away from his opponents to win by eight lengths from the early leader Captain James with Pollerton a length and a half further back in third. At Newmarket Racecourse in October, North Stoke faced by far the strongest opposition of his career in the Champion Stakes but was nevertheless made a short-priced favourite ahead of Relkino, Arctic Tern, Flying Water and Malacate. He was among the leaders from the start in a slowly-run race before appearing to be outpaced in the closing stages and finishing third of the eight runners behind Flying Water and Relkino. The colt's connections felt that he had not produced his best form and Timeform noted that he had looked "a bit light and hard-trained" before the race and had hung his head to the right in the closing stages.

North Stoke remained in training in 1978 but was prevented from racing by injury and was retired at the end of the season.

== Assessment ==
There was no International Classification of European two-year-olds in 1976: the official handicappers of Britain, Ireland and France compiled separate rankings for horses which competed in those countries. In the British Free Handicap, North Stoke was not given a rating, although the independent Timeform organisation gave him a rating of 105, twenty-six pounds below their top-rated two-year-old Blushing Groom. In the following year, he was rated twelve pounds behind Alleged in both the British and Irish Handicap. Timeform, however, gave him a rating of 130, only seven pounds behind Alleged, their top-rated Horse of the Year, making him their highest-rated British-trained three-year-old colt.

== Stud record ==
North Stoke stood as a breeding stallion for one season, his only foals being born in 1980. The most successful of his offspring were Leccia, who won eight races in the United States and Northern Game, who won the Triumph Hurdle in 1984.

== Pedigree ==
Pedigree of North Stoke (IRE), chestnut stallion, 1974
Sire Northfields (USA) 1968	Northern Dancer (CAN); 1961	Nearctic	Nearco
Sire Northfields (USA) 1968	Northern Dancer (CAN); 1961	Nearctic	Lady Angela
Sire Northfields (USA) 1968	Northern Dancer (CAN); 1961	Natalma	Native Dancer
Sire Northfields (USA) 1968	Northern Dancer (CAN); 1961	Natalma	Almahmoud
Sire Northfields (USA) 1968	Little Hut (USA); 1952	Occupy	Bull Dog
Sire Northfields (USA) 1968	Little Hut (USA); 1952	Occupy	Miss Bunting
Sire Northfields (USA) 1968	Little Hut (USA); 1952	Savage Beauty	Challenger
Sire Northfields (USA) 1968	Little Hut (USA); 1952	Savage Beauty	Khara
Dam Mother (GB) 1963	Whistler (GB); 1950	Panorama	Sir Cosmo
Dam Mother (GB) 1963	Whistler (GB); 1950	Panorama	Happy Climax
Dam Mother (GB) 1963	Whistler (GB); 1950	Farthing Damages	Fair Trial
Dam Mother (GB) 1963	Whistler (GB); 1950	Farthing Damages	Futility
Dam Mother (GB) 1963	Esmeralda (GB); 1956	Tulyar	Tehran
Dam Mother (GB) 1963	Esmeralda (GB); 1956	Tulyar	Neocracy
Dam Mother (GB) 1963	Esmeralda (GB); 1956	Mahallat	Nearco
Dam Mother (GB) 1963	Esmeralda (GB); 1956	Mahallat	Majideh (Family 5-e)
