= Northern Treasure =

Irish-bred Thoroughbred racehorse

- Sire: Northfields
- Grandsire: Northern Dancer
- Dam: Place d'Etoile
- Damsire: Kythnos
- Sex: Stallion
- Foaled: 18 February 1973
- Country: Ireland
- Colour: Chestnut
- Breeder: Tim Rogers & C G St Lawrence
- Owner: A D Brennan
- Trainer: Kevin Prendergast
- Record: 18: 4-7-5

Major wins
- Irish 2000 Guineas (1976); Blandford Stakes (1976)

Awards
- Timeform rating 107 (1975), 126 (1976)

Northern Treasure (foaled 18 February 1973) was an Irish Thoroughbred racehorse and sire. As a two-year-old in 1975 he won twice, finished second six times and third once from nine races, showing consistent form but appearing to be some way short of top class. In the following spring he was beaten in his first four races before recording an upset win in the Irish 2000 Guineas. He continued his improvement when moved up in distance, winning the Blandford Stakes and finishing third in both the Irish Derby and the Champion Stakes. After his retirement from racing he was exported to stand as a breeding stallion in Australia.

== Background ==
Northern Treasure was a chestnut horse with a white star bred in Ireland by Tim Rogers and C. G. St Lawrence. As a yearling he was put up for auction and sold for 3,100 guineas. He entered the ownership of A. D. Brennan and was sent into training with Kevin Prendergast.

He was sired by Northfields, an American horse whose biggest win came in the Louisiana Derby in 1971, before spending most of his stud career in Europe. His other winners included Northjet, Oats, North Stoke and No Pass No Sale (Poule d'Essai des Poulains). He was the second foal of his dam Place d'Etoile, a high-class racemare who won the Pretty Polly Stakes in 1970. Her dam Etoile de Paris was an influential broodmare whose descendants have included Dubawi, High-Rise, In The Wings and Virginia Waters.

== Racing career ==
=== 1975: two-year-old season ===
Northern Treasure began his racing career in April 1975 and failed to win in his first five races although he showed very consistent form, finishing second four times and third once. On his sixth appearance he contested a maiden race over six furlongs at Phoenix Park Racecourse in August and recorded his first victory, beating Poacher's Moon by four lengths. On his next appearance he was stepped up in distance and won a nursery (a handicap for two-year-olds) over seven furlongs at Leopardstown Racecourse. In his last two races of the year ran in nurseries and finished second over five furlongs at Leopardstown in September and over six furlongs at Naas in October.

=== 1976: three-year-old season ===
Northern Treasure began his second campaign by finishing third over five furlongs and then ran third behind the top weight Northern View in the Madrid Free Handicap at the Curragh in April, beaten more than five lengths by the winner. Later that month he was moved up to Group Three class for the Vauxhall Trial Stakes at Phoenix Park and finished fourth behind Lucky Wednesday, Sovereign Dice and Wolverlife. Despite a defeat over six furlongs on his net appearance, Northern Treasure was then moved up to the highest class for the Group One Irish 2000 Guineas at the Curragh on 15 May, in which he was ridden by Gabriel Curran and started a 33/1 outsider in a seventeen-runner field. The French colt Comeram (second in the Grand Critérium and third in the Poule d'Essai des Poulains) started favourite ahead of the Italian challenger Northern Spring (Gran Criterium) and the main English hope Patris (fourth in the 2000 Guineas) while the other runners included Northern View, Lucky Wednesday, Wolverlife and Poacher's Moon. The field was tightly grouped for most of the way and there was a considerable amount of barging and scrimmaging for position but in the last quarter mile the contest devolved into a three-way struggle between Lucky Wednesday on the rail, Northern Treasure on the outside and Comeram (partnered by Lester Piggott) racing between his two rivals. In a closely contested finish the outsider prevailed over the favourite as Northern Treasure won by a short head from Comeram, with the weakening Lucky Wednesday a length behind in third place.

On 26 June Northern Treasure was moved up in distance to contest the Irish Derby over one and a half miles at the Curragh and started the 10/1 fourth choice in the betting. He proved the best of the British and Irish challengers as he finished third of the seventeen runners behind the French-trained colts Malacate and Empery. He was dropped in class for the Group Three Blandford Stakes over the same course and distance in August and won easily from his stable companion Whistling Deer. In the inaugural running of the Joe McGrath Memorial Stakes at Leopardstown on 25 September he started second favourite but failed to reproduce his best form as he finished fourth behind Malacate, Mart Lane and Niebo. On his final racecourse appearance he was sent to England for the Champion Stakesover ten furlongs at Newmarket Racecourse in October. Ridden by Brian Taylor, he produced what was arguably his best performance as he finished third behind Vitiges and Rose Bowl, with Malacate, Crow and Wollow finishing behind.

== Assessment ==
There was no International Classification of European two-year-olds in 1975: the official handicappers of Britain, Ireland and France compiled separate rankings for horses which competed in those countries. Northern Treasure was given a weight of 116 in the Irish Free Handicap, thirteen pounds behind the top-rated Malinowski. The independent Timeform organisation, in their annual Racehorses of 1975 gave him a rating of 107, 23 pounds behind their best two-year-old colt Manado. In 1976 he was rated 126 by Timeform, nine pounds behind their top three-year-old Youth.

== Stud record ==
In August 1976 Northern Treasure was purchased privately the bloodstock agency BBA (Ireland). At the end of his racing career he was exported to Australia and began his career as a breeding stallion at the Newhaven Park Stud in New South Wales. The best of his offspring included Northern Reward (Phar Lap Stakes, Villiers Stakes), Chinese Treasure (Black Opal Stakes) and Bullion Broker (Caulfield Sprint).

== Pedigree ==
Pedigree of Northern Treasure (IRE), chestnut stallion, 1973
Sire Northfields (USA) 1968	Northern Dancer (CAN); 1961	Nearctic	Nearco
Sire Northfields (USA) 1968	Northern Dancer (CAN); 1961	Nearctic	Lady Angela
Sire Northfields (USA) 1968	Northern Dancer (CAN); 1961	Natalma	Native Dancer
Sire Northfields (USA) 1968	Northern Dancer (CAN); 1961	Natalma	Almahmoud
Sire Northfields (USA) 1968	Little Hut (USA); 1952	Occupy	Bull Dog
Sire Northfields (USA) 1968	Little Hut (USA); 1952	Occupy	Miss Bunting
Sire Northfields (USA) 1968	Little Hut (USA); 1952	Savage Beauty	Challenger
Sire Northfields (USA) 1968	Little Hut (USA); 1952	Savage Beauty	Khara
Dam Place d'Etoile (GB) 1967	Kythnos (GB); 1957	Nearula	Nasrullah
Dam Place d'Etoile (GB) 1967	Kythnos (GB); 1957	Nearula	Respite
Dam Place d'Etoile (GB) 1967	Kythnos (GB); 1957	Capital Issue	Straight Deal
Dam Place d'Etoile (GB) 1967	Kythnos (GB); 1957	Capital Issue	Pilch
Dam Place d'Etoile (GB) 1967	Etoile de France (GB); 1957	Arctic Star	Nearco
Dam Place d'Etoile (GB) 1967	Etoile de France (GB); 1957	Arctic Star	Serena
Dam Place d'Etoile (GB) 1967	Etoile de France (GB); 1957	Miss France	Jock
Dam Place d'Etoile (GB) 1967	Etoile de France (GB); 1957	Miss France	Nafah (Family 9-e)

- Northern Treasure was inbred 4 × 4 to Nearco, meaning that this stallion appears twice in the fourth generations of his pedigree.
