= Frank Catrone =

American jockey and trainer

Frank Catrone, Jr.
Personal information
- Born: August 12, 1906 New Haven, Connecticut
- Died: March 7, 1985 (aged 78) Broward County, Florida
- Occupation: Jockey / Trainer

Horse racing career
- Sport: Horse racing
- Career wins: Not found

Major racing wins
- As a jockey: American Legion Handicap (1927); Bay Shore Handicap (1927); Jamaica Handicap (1930); Ohio Derby (1931); Tremont Stakes (1931) As a trainer: Arlington Handicap (1942); Derby Trial Stakes (1942); Dwyer Stakes (1942); Ashland Stakes (1943); Stars and Stripes Turf Handicap (1943); Juvenile Stakes (1946); Youthful Stakes (1946, 1948); Astoria Stakes (1948); East View Stakes (1949); New Jersey Futurity (1950); Excelsior Handicap (1952); Gallant Fox Handicap (1952); McLennan Handicap (1952); Widener Handicap (1952); Tropical Park Handicap (1953); San Vicente Stakes (1965); Santa Anita Derby (1965); Blue Grass Stakes (1965); Santa Anita Handicap (1966); Demoiselle Stakes (1971); Long Island Handicap (1972); Alcibiades Stakes (1973); Bowling Green Handicap (1974); Molly Pitcher Handicap (1974); Palm Beach Handicap (1974); Top Flight Handicap (1974) American Classic Race wins: Kentucky Derby (1965)

Significant horses
- Rounders, Lucky Debonair, Spartan Valor
- Updated on July 31, 2008

Frank Catrone, Jr. (August 12, 1906 – March 7, 1985) was an American thoroughbred horse racing jockey, who is best known for winning the 1965 Kentucky Derby as a trainer.

Catrone stood 4 feet 9 inches (1.45 m) tall. While selling newspapers at a stand outside Saratoga Race Course in Saratoga Springs, New York, the diminutive 17-year-old was offered the chance to train to be a jockey by future U.S. Racing Hall of Fame trainer Sam Hildreth. Although Catrone met with some success as a jockey, he achieved nationwide recognition as a trainer. Battling weight problems, in 1936 he began his professional career as a trainer. In the early 1940s, he trained for Texan Emerson F. Woodward's Valdina Farms. Among his successes for Valdina, Catrone won the 1942 Derby Trial Stakes with Valdina Orphan, who then finished third to winner Shut Out in the Kentucky Derby.

Following Emerson's death in a May 1943 auto accident, Catrone trained for several owners until 1948 when he was hired by William G. Helis, Sr. whose colt Spartan Valor would be described by Catrone as the best horse he had trained up to that time.

By 1964, Catrone was the secondary trainer behind Clyde Troutt for the breeding/racing stable of Dan and Ada Rice. When the Rices decided to race at Santa Anita Park over the winter of 1964–65, one of the horses Catrone brought West was a colt named Lucky Debonair who had made only one start at age two at the Atlantic City Race Course, where he finished out of the money. In 1965, Lucky Debonair gave Catrone his greatest success in racing, winning the Santa Anita Derby, the Blue Grass Stakes and the Kentucky Derby. In 1966, Lucky Debonair won California's most famous race, the Santa Anita Handicap.

Catrone continued to train for the Rice stable until Dan Rice died in 1975 and his widow, Ada, disbanded the racing stable.
