= Captain's Gig (horse) =

American-bred Thoroughbred racehorse

- Sire: Turn-To
- Grandsire: Royal Charger
- Dam: Make Sail
- Damsire: Ambiorix
- Sex: Stallion
- Foaled: 1965
- Country: United States
- Colour: Dark Bay/Brown
- Breeder: Cain Hoy Stable
- Owner: Cain Hoy Stable
- Trainer: William W. Stephens
- Record: 15: 8-3-1
- Earnings: US$205,312

Major wins
- Futurity Stakes (1967); Forerunner Purse (1968); Stepping Stone Purse (1968); Jim Dandy Stakes (1968)
- Last updated on June 26, 2010

Captain's Gig (foaled 1965 in Kentucky) was an American Thoroughbred racehorse.

== Background ==
Captain's Gig was bred and raced by Harry Guggenheim's Cain Hoy Stable. Sired by Turn-To, his dam was Guggenheim's good runner Make Sail who in 1960 won the Kentucky Oaks and Alabama Stakes. Damsire Ambiorix was the Leading sire in North America in 1961 and the Leading broodmare sire in Great Britain & Ireland in 1963. He was trained by Bill Stephens,

== Racing career ==
Captain's Gig won three of five starts at age two in 1967. His wins that year included the most prestigious race for American juveniles, the Futurity Stakes at Aqueduct in which he set a new track record. As a three-year-old en route to the first leg of the 1968 U.S. Triple Crown series, the lightly raced colt won an Allowance race followed by a 3½ length win in the Forerunner Purse at Keeneland. He then ran away from the field in capturing the Stepping Stone Purse by eight lengths at Churchill Downs. Sent off as the fourth choice by bettors in the Kentucky Derby, Captain's Gig finished tenth. The colt went on to run second in both the Jersey Derby and the Jerome Handicap but won the Jim Dandy Stakes at Saratoga Race Course.

== Stud record ==
Captain's Gig was retired to stud for the 1970 season. He stood in the United States in 1970 and 1971 then was sent to breeders in Ireland in time for the 1972 season. He was not a very successful at stud, but did sire Manado, the leading European two-year-old of 1975.
