= Malacate =

American-bred Thoroughbred racehorse

- Sire: Lucky Debonair
- Grandsire: Vertex
- Dam: Eyeshadow
- Damsire: My Babu
- Sex: Stallion
- Foaled: 18 April 1973
- Country: United States
- Colour: Bay
- Breeder: Thomas C. Sturgill
- Owner: María Félix Berger
- Trainer: François Boutin
- Record: 16: 8-0-2

Major wins
- Prix La Force (1976); Irish Derby (1976); Joe McGrath Memorial Stakes (1976); Prix Foy (1976)

Awards
- Timeform rating 131 (1976), 123 (1977)

Malacate (foaled 18 April 1973) was an American-bred, French-trained Thoroughbred racehorse and sire. He showed some promise as a two-year-old in 1975, before emerging as one of the leading colts of his generation in Europe in the following year. His performances in 1976 included wins in the Prix La Force, Irish Derby (beating Empery) and the first running of the Joe McGrath Memorial Stakes, in addition to running well in races such as the Prix du Jockey Club, King George VI and Queen Elizabeth Stakes and Champion Stakes. After failing in his first season at stud he returned to racing in 1977 and won the Prix Foy. He was then retired for a second time and had some success as a sire or winners in Japan.

== Background ==
Malacate was a bay horse with a white star and snip bred in Kentucky by Thomas C. Sturgill. He was probably the best horse sired by the American stallion Lucky Debonair who won the Kentucky Derby in 1965 and the Santa Anita Handicap in 1966. Malacate's dam Eyeshadow failed to win a race but produced several other winners in the United States as well as Alshandegha, the dam of the Australian Derby winner Mahogany. As a descendant of the broodmare Princess Camelia, Eyeshadow was a distant relative of the Dubai World Cup winner Captain Steve.

As a yearling Malacate was offered for sale at Keeneland and bought for $40,000 by representatives of María Félix, a Mexican actress and wife of French financier Alex Berger. The colt was sent to Europe to be trained in France by François Boutin.

== Racing career ==
=== 1975: two-year-old season ===
On his racecourse debut, Malacate won a maiden race over 1500 metres at Deauville Racecourse in August. He was then moved up in class and distance for the Prix des Chênes over 1600 metres at Longchamp Racecourse and finished sixth of the eleven runners behind French Swanee.

=== 1976: three-year-old season ===
On his debut as a three-year-old, Malacate contested the Prix des Epinettes over 2200 metres at Longchamp and won by one and a half lengths from Loosen Up and Rec The Toolhouse, to whom he was conceding four and five pounds respectively. He followed up in the Listed Prix de Suresnes at the same course, beating Exceller by a length. On 23 May, Malacate was moved up to Group Three level for the Prix La Force over 2000 metres at Longchamp. Ridden as usual by Philippe Paquet, he was restrained at the back of the field before producing a strong run in the straight to win by one and a half lengths from the filly Start The Game, with Happy Tim in third.

On 6 June Malacate started at odds of 8/1 for the Prix du Jockey Club over 2400 metres at Chantilly Racecourse. Repeating his previous tactics, Paquet held the colt up at the back of the field but when he attempted to move forward on the final turn he was forced to the wide outside and entered the straight with a very large amount of ground to make up. He accelerated impressively in the straight but was unable to reach the leader and finished third, beaten three lengths and three quarters of a length by the favourite Youth and the Prix Noailles winner Twig Moss. Twenty days after his defeat at Chantilly, Malacate was sent overseas for the first time to contest the Irish Derby over one and half miles at the Curragh. He started 5/1 second favourite behind Youth's stable companion Empery who had won the Epsom Derby, while the other contenders included Northern Treasure, Far North (Prix Saint-Roman), Hawkberry (later to win the Great Voltigeur Stakes) and the Vincent O'Brien-trained Niebo (Anglesey Stakes, Railway Stakes). In a change of tactics, Malacate raced close to the leaders before moving up to second behind Empery in the straight. He overtook the Derby winner a furlong and a half from the finish and drew away in the closing stages to win easily by two and a half lengths from Empery with Northern Treasure taking third ahead of Hawkberry. Later in July the colt contested Britain's most prestigious weight-for-age race, the King George VI and Queen Elizabeth Stakes at Ascot Racecourse, and started 13/2 fourth choice in the betting behind Youth, Pawneese and Bruni. Paquet repeated the tactics employed in Ireland, racing close to the leaders before moving up to second in the straight. He was unable, however, to make any impact on the leader Pawneese and was overtaken in the final furlong by Bruni, Orange Bay and Dakota to finish in fifth place.

After a six-week break, Malacate returned in September for the Prix Niel, a trial race for the Prix de l'Arc de Triomphe. He started the 7/4 second favourite but finished third of the five runners behind Youth and Arctic Tern. Three weeks later the colt was sent back to Ireland for the inaugural running of the Joe McGrath Memorial Stakes over ten furlongs at Leopardstown Racecourse. With Paquet serving a suspension, Lester Piggott took over the ride on Malacate, who started the 4/5 favourite against ten opponents, the most prominent in the betting being Northern Treasure, Hawkberry and Niebo, all of whom he had beaten at the Curragh. Ridden with great confidence by Piggott, he turned into the straight in sixth place, took the lead approaching the final furlong and on easily by one and a half lengths from Mart Lane, with Niebo taking third ahead of Northern Treasure. On his final start of the year he ran in the Champion Stakes over ten furlongs at Newmarket Racecourse in October. The field split into two groups with Malacate, ridden again by Lester Piggott, racing on the stands-side (the left-hand side from the jockeys' viewpoint) where the ground was slower. He started poorly but took the lead in the stands-side group a quarter of a mile from the finish. He was never seriously challenged by his immediate rivals, but finished only fourth behind Vitiges, Rose Bowl and Northern Treasure, all of whom had raced on the far side. Timeform commented that his performance was probably of equal merit to that of the race winner.

=== 1977: four-year-old season ===
Malacate suffered from low fertility in his first season at stud and was sent back into training in 1977. He made his first appearance of the season in the Prix des Erables over 1600 metres at Chantilly in July and won easily by five lengths. In August he was sent to England for the sixth running of the Benson and Hedges Gold Cup over ten and a half furlongs at York Racecourse and finished fifth behind the 33/1 outsider Relkino. On 11 September at Longchamp, the colt started 2.3/1 second favourite for the Prix Foy, a trial race for the Prix de l'Arc de Triomphe in which he was opposed by Arctic Tern, Ranimer (Sun Chariot Stakes) Roan Star (Prix de la Forêt) and On My Way. Ridden by Paquet, he won by three-uarters of a length from On My Way with Ranimer in third and the favourite Arctic Tern in fourth. In the Prix de l'Arc de Triomphe on 2 October, Malacate started at odds of 12/1 and finished eighth of the twenty-six runners, six lengths behind the winner Alleged. On his final racecourse appearance he finished sixth behind Flying Water in the Champion Stakes.

== Assessment ==
There was no International Classification of European two-year-olds in 1975: the official handicappers of Britain, Ireland and France compiled separate rankings for horses which competed in those countries. Malacate was not awarded a rating in the French Handicap, despite having beaten at least two horses which were included. In the French Handicap for 1976, he was rated the third-best three-year-old behind Youth and Crow, level with Exceller, Empery and Pawneese. The independent Timeform organisation gave him a rating of 131, four pounds behind Youth, their Horse of the Year. In 1977, he was rated the tenth-best older horse to run in France, seven pounds behind Balmerino in the official French Handicap, whilst Timeform gave him a rating of 123.

== Stud record ==
At the end of the 1976 season, Malacate was syndicated for £11,500 a share, giving him a theoretical value of £460,000. Maria Felix and Tim Rogers each took a quarter of the shares. He began his stud career at the Grangewilliam Stud at Maynooth, County Kildare in 1977 but after proving to be sub-fertile he was returned to training. He returned to Grangewilliam at the end of the season and resumed his stud career in 1978 at a fee of 2,500 guineas before being exported to Japan a year later. By far the best of his offspring was Lead Hoyu, who won the Arima Kinen in 1983. He was "put out of stud" in Japan on 12 October 1991.

== Sire line tree ==
- Malacate
  - Norman Style
    - Pendragon
  - Lead Hoyu

== Pedigree ==
Pedigree of Malacate (USA), bay stallion, 1973
Sire Lucky Debonair (USA) 1962	Vertex (USA); 1954	The Rhymer	St Germans
Sire Lucky Debonair (USA) 1962	Vertex (USA); 1954	The Rhymer	Rhythmic
Sire Lucky Debonair (USA) 1962	Vertex (USA); 1954	Kanace	Case Ace*
Sire Lucky Debonair (USA) 1962	Vertex (USA); 1954	Kanace	Kanlast
Sire Lucky Debonair (USA) 1962	Fresh As Fresh (USA); 1957	Count Fleet	Reigh Count
Sire Lucky Debonair (USA) 1962	Fresh As Fresh (USA); 1957	Count Fleet	Quickly
Sire Lucky Debonair (USA) 1962	Fresh As Fresh (USA); 1957	Airy	Bull Lea*
Sire Lucky Debonair (USA) 1962	Fresh As Fresh (USA); 1957	Airy	Proud One
Dam Eyeshadow (USA) 1959	My Babu (FR); 1945	Djebel	Tourbillon
Dam Eyeshadow (USA) 1959	My Babu (FR); 1945	Djebel	Loika
Dam Eyeshadow (USA) 1959	My Babu (FR); 1945	Perfume	Badruddin
Dam Eyeshadow (USA) 1959	My Babu (FR); 1945	Perfume	Lavendula
Dam Eyeshadow (USA) 1959	Pretty One (USA); 1947	Bull Dog*	Teddy*
Dam Eyeshadow (USA) 1959	Pretty One (USA); 1947	Bull Dog*	Plucky Liege*
Dam Eyeshadow (USA) 1959	Pretty One (USA); 1947	Irvana	Blue Larkspur
Dam Eyeshadow (USA) 1959	Pretty One (USA); 1947	Irvana	Princess Camelia (Family: 20-a)

* Malacate is inbred 5S x 3D to the stallion Bull Dog, meaning that he appears fifth generation (via Bull Lea) on the sire side of his pedigree, and third generation on the dam side of his pedigree.

* Malacate is inbred 5S x 6S x 4D to the stallion Teddy, meaning that he appears fifth generation (via Bull Lea) and sixth generation (Case Ace) on the sire side of his pedigree, and fourth generation on the dam side of his pedigree.
