= Crystal Palace (horse) =

French-bred Thoroughbred racehorse (1974–1995)

- Sire: Caro
- Grandsire: Fortino
- Dam: Hermieres
- Damsire: Sicambre
- Sex: Stallion
- Foaled: 25 March 1974
- Country: France
- Colour: Grey
- Breeder: Guy de Rothschild
- Owner: Guy de Rothschild
- Trainer: François Mathet
- Record: 9:4-2-2

Major wins
- Prix de Courcelles (1977); Prix du Jockey Club (1977); Prix Niel (1977)

Awards
- Timeform rating 132 (1977)

Crystal Palace (25 March 1974 – 6 October 1995) was a French thoroughbred racehorse and sire. After winning one of his two races as a two-year-old he emerged as a top-class middle distance performer in 1977 recording victories in the Prix de Courcelles, Prix du Jockey Club and Prix Niel. He also finished second in the Prix Lupin, fourth in the King George VI and Queen Elizabeth Diamond Stakes and third in the Prix de l'Arc de Triomphe. At the end of his racing career he was retired to stud and proved to be a successful breeding stallion in France and Japan.

== Background ==
Crystal Palace was a grey horse with a white blaze and four white socks bred in France by his owner Guy de Rothschild. Crystal Palace's coat lightened with age, but during his racing career he was a very dark grey. The name Crystal Palace has been used for several other Thoroughbred racehorses including an influential British broodmare. His sire, Caro, was a top-class performer (rated 133 by Timeform), whose wins included the Poule d'Essai des Poulains, Prix Ganay and Prix d'Ispahan, before becoming a very successful breeding stallion. Caro's other progeny included Madelia, Cozzene and Winning Colors. Crystal Palace's dam, Hermieres, won the Prix de Diane in 1961, but had previously had a mediocre record as a broodmare, producing only two minor winners. Hermieres' dam Vieille Pierre, was a half-sister to the Grand Prix de Paris winner Vieux Manoir. Crystal Palace was sent into training with the veteran François Mathet at Chantilly.

== Racing career ==
=== 1976: two-year-old season ===
Crystal Palace was not highly tried as a two-year-old, finishing second over 1500 metres on his debut and then winning a minor race over 1600m at Maisons-Laffitte. He did not receive a rating in the 1976 French Free Handicap.

=== 1977: three-year-old season ===
After finishing third on his first appearance as a three-year-old, Crystal Palace easily defeated Montcontour (who went on to win the Prix Hocquart) in the Prix de Courcelles at Longchamp Racecourse over 2000m in April. The colt was then moved up in class for the Group One Prix Lupin over 2100m at the same course on 15 May and started 7/4 favourite against ten opponents. After reportedly having trouble obtaining a clear run in the straight he finished strongly to take second place, three quarters of a length behind Pharly. On 5 June, ridden as usual by Gerard Dubroeucq, started 6/4 favourite for the Prix du Jockey Club over 2400m at Chantilly Racecourse. The best of his locally trained opponents appeared to be Pharly, Carwhite (Prix Daru) and Catus (Prix Noailles), with the only international challenger being the Irish-trained Artaius. Crystal Palace raced in second place behind his stable companion Concertino, who set a fast pace for 400m before slowing, allowing the rest of the runners to move closer approaching the final turn. In the closing stages, Crystal Palace gradually wore down Concertino, taking the lead 200 metres from the finish and won by half a length from Artaius, with Concertino another half length away in third. Catus, Olantengy, Funny Hobby, Carwhite and Pharly were close behind, and the fact that the first eight home were covered by less than four lengths led to speculation that the standard of the race was unexceptional.

In July, Crystal Palace was sent to England to contest Britain's most prestigious all-aged race, the King George VI and Queen Elizabeth Diamond Stakes over one and a half miles at Ascot Racecourse. Having been settled towards the rear of the field, he appeared to be outpaced on the approach to the final turn, and although he made up ground in the straight he never looked likely to win, and finished fourth behind The Minstrel, Orange Bay and Exceller. Timeform commented in their annual Racehorse of 1977 that Dubroeucq's lack of experience on the Ascot track might have hindered the colt's performance. Crystal Palace next appeared on 11 September, when he started 7/10 favourite for the Prix Niel at Longchamp, a trial race for the Prix de l'Arc de Triomphe. Conceding weight to his six opponents, he won "most decisively" by two and a half lengths from Paico. The colt made his final racecourse appearance in the Arc at Longchamp on 2 October. Starting the joint-second-favourite at odds of 8/1 he was positioned prominently throughout the race and made steady progress in the straight without ever looking likely to win and finished third of the twenty-six runners behind Alleged and Balmerino.

== Assessment ==
As noted above, Crystal Palace's performances as a two-year-old were insufficiently notable for him to be rated in the French Free Handicap. In the official International Classification for 1977, Crystal Palace was ranked fourth among the three-year-olds behind Alleged, Blushing Groom and The Minstrel, and the ninth best horse in Europe of any age. The independent Timeform organisation gave him a rating of 132, five pounds below their horse of the year Alleged.

== Stud record ==
Crystal Palace was retired from racing to become a breeding stallion in France. He was a very successful sire of winners, and was the Leading sire in France in 1985. His progeny included Mersey (Prix Royal Oak), Grise Mine (Prix Saint-Alary), Galla Placidia (Grand Prix d'Evry, Prix de Pomone) and Crazy (Ebor Handicap). He was exported to Japan in 1984, where he sired Prekrasnie who won the Tenno Sho in 1991. Crystal Palace died in Japan on 6 October 1995.

== Pedigree ==
Pedigree of Crystal Palace (FR), grey horse, 1974
Sire Caro (IRE) 1967	Fortino (FR); 1959	Grey Sovereign	Nasrullah
Sire Caro (IRE) 1967	Fortino (FR); 1959	Grey Sovereign	Kong
Sire Caro (IRE) 1967	Fortino (FR); 1959	Ranavalo	Relic
Sire Caro (IRE) 1967	Fortino (FR); 1959	Ranavalo	Navarra
Sire Caro (IRE) 1967	Chambord (GB); 1955	Chamoissaire	Precipitation
Sire Caro (IRE) 1967	Chambord (GB); 1955	Chamoissaire	Snowberry
Sire Caro (IRE) 1967	Chambord (GB); 1955	Life Hill	Solario
Sire Caro (IRE) 1967	Chambord (GB); 1955	Life Hill	Lady of the Snows
Dam Hermieres (FR) 1958	Sicambre (FR); 1948	Prince Bio	Prince Rose
Dam Hermieres (FR) 1958	Sicambre (FR); 1948	Prince Bio	Biologie
Dam Hermieres (FR) 1958	Sicambre (FR); 1948	Sif	Rialto
Dam Hermieres (FR) 1958	Sicambre (FR); 1948	Sif	Suavita
Dam Hermieres (FR) 1958	Vieille Pierre (FR); 1951	Blue Peter	Fairway
Dam Hermieres (FR) 1958	Vieille Pierre (FR); 1951	Blue Peter	Fancy Free
Dam Hermieres (FR) 1958	Vieille Pierre (FR); 1951	Vieille Maison	Finglas
Dam Hermieres (FR) 1958	Vieille Pierre (FR); 1951	Vieille Maison	Vieille Canaille (Family: 10-e)
