= Lucky Debonair =

American Thoroughbred racehorse

- Sire: Vertex
- Grandsire: The Rhymer
- Dam: Fresh as Fresh
- Damsire: Count Fleet
- Sex: Stallion
- Foaled: May 2, 1962
- Died: July 10, 1987 (aged 25)
- Country: United States
- Colour: Bay
- Breeder: Danada Farm
- Owner: Ada L. Rice Racing Stable
- Trainer: Frank Catrone
- Record: 16: 9-3-0
- Earnings: $370,960

Major wins
- San Vicente Handicap (1965); Santa Anita Derby, (1965); Blue Grass Stakes (1965); Santa Anita Handicap (1966) Triple Crown race wins: Kentucky Derby (1965)

Honours
- Lucky Debonair Court, Wheaton, Illinois

Lucky Debonair (May 2, 1962 – July 10, 1987) was an American Thoroughbred racehorse best known for winning the 1965 Kentucky Derby.

== Background ==
He was bred by owners Dan and Ada Rice of Wheaton, Illinois at their Danada Farm satellite operation on Old Frankfort Pike near Lexington, Kentucky, a property that once was part of the Idle Hour Stock Farm. Lucky Debonair was sired by Vertex out of the mare Fresh as Fresh, who was a daughter of the 1943 U.S. Triple Crown Champion Count Fleet.

He was conditioned for racing by trainer Frank Catrone,

== Racing career ==
As a two-year-old in 1964, Lucky Debonair made one start at the Atlantic City Race Course, where he finished out of the money. Sent to race in California at age three, the unheralded colt was ridden by Bill Shoemaker. He finished second in the San Felipe Stakes and won the San Vicente Handicap, both at Santa Anita Park in Arcadia. He was a supplementary entrant in the West Coast's most important race for three-year-olds, the Santa Anita Derby. Under Shoemaker, Lucky Debonair won the race by four lengths and set a new stakes record of 1:47.00, a time that as of 2008 has been equaled but not broken. He followed this victory with another very important win in the Blue Grass Stakes at Keeneland Race Course and was made the second choice among bettors for the Kentucky Derby.

Lucky Debonair gave Shoemaker his third Derby win by defeating ten other top three-year-olds, including the heavily favored American Champion Two-Year-Old Colt of 1964 Bold Lad (10th), the brilliantly fast Ogden Phipps colt Dapper Dan (2nd), future U.S. Racing Hall of Fame inductee Tom Rolfe (3rd), and Hail To All (5th). In the second leg of the Triple Crown, the Preakness Stakes, a bruised ankle that almost caused him to be withdrawn from the race contributed to Lucky Debonair finishing seventh. The colt did not run in the Belmont Stakes.

Lucky Debonair returned to racing at age four in 1966. He won three of five starts, including a win over Native Diver in California's prestigious Santa Anita Handicap.

== Stud record ==
Retired to stud duty at the Rices' farm in Kentucky, before being sent to Venezuela in 1976 when the then-widowed Ada Rice disbanded her racing stable. He produced fifteen stakes winners including the Irish Derby winner Malacate.

Lucky Debonair died of old age in 1987 at age twenty-five. On May 4, 2002, the city of Wheaton, Illinois honored him with a plaque and memorial rock at the Danada Equestrian Center.

== Sire line tree ==
- Lucky Debonair
  - Pepenador
    - Regidor
    - Triplicador
    - Petrolero
    - Periquin
    - Cheyenne
    - Double Paid
  - Malacate
    - Norman Style
      - Pendragon
    - Lead Hoyu

== Pedigree ==
Pedigree of Lucky Debonair (USA), bay stallion, 1962
Sire Vertex (USA) 1954	The Rhymer (USA); 1938	St Germans	Swynford
Sire Vertex (USA) 1954	The Rhymer (USA); 1938	St Germans	Hamoaze
Sire Vertex (USA) 1954	The Rhymer (USA); 1938	Rhythmic	Royal Minstrel
Sire Vertex (USA) 1954	The Rhymer (USA); 1938	Rhythmic	Rinkey
Sire Vertex (USA) 1954	Kanace (USA); 1945	Case Ace	Teddy*
Sire Vertex (USA) 1954	Kanace (USA); 1945	Case Ace	Sweetheart
Sire Vertex (USA) 1954	Kanace (USA); 1945	Kanlast	Kantar
Sire Vertex (USA) 1954	Kanace (USA); 1945	Kanlast	Last Light
Dam Fresh As Fresh (USA) 1957	Count Fleet (USA); 1940	Reigh Count	Sunreigh
Dam Fresh As Fresh (USA) 1957	Count Fleet (USA); 1940	Reigh Count	Contessina
Dam Fresh As Fresh (USA) 1957	Count Fleet (USA); 1940	Quickly	Haste
Dam Fresh As Fresh (USA) 1957	Count Fleet (USA); 1940	Quickly	Stephanie
Dam Fresh As Fresh (USA) 1957	Airy (USA); 1945	Bull Lea	Bull Dog*
Dam Fresh As Fresh (USA) 1957	Airy (USA); 1945	Bull Lea	Rose Leaves
Dam Fresh As Fresh (USA) 1957	Airy (USA); 1945	Proud One	Blenheim
Dam Fresh As Fresh (USA) 1957	Airy (USA); 1945	Proud One	Some Pomp (Family 3-d)

* Lucky Debonair is inbred 4S x 5D to the stallion Teddy, meaning that he appears fourth generation on the sire side of his pedigree, and fifth generation (via Bull Dog) on the dam side of his pedigree.
