= Tachypous =

British-bred Thoroughbred racehorse

- Sire: Hotfoot
- Grandsire: Firestreak
- Dam: Stilvi
- Damsire: Derring-Do
- Sex: Stallion
- Foaled: 1974
- Country: United Kingdom
- Colour: Bay
- Breeder: George Cambanis
- Owner: George Cambanis
- Trainer: Bruce Hobbs
- Record: 10: 2-3-2

Major wins
- Middle Park Stakes (1976)

Awards
- Timeform rating 128 (1976), 123 (1977)

Tachypous (foaled 1974) was a British Thoroughbred racehorse and sire. As a two-year-old in 1976 he showed early promise and recovered from illness to defeat a strong field in the Middle Park Stakes. In the following year he failed to win but produced his best performance when finishing second in the 2000 Guineas. Apart from his two wins he was placed in the Richmond Stakes, Greenham Stakes and St James's Palace Stakes. He made no impact as a breeding stallion.

== Background ==
Tachypous was a "rangy, most attractive" bay horse with white socks on his hind feet bred by his owner George Cambanis. He was sired by Hotfoot who won the Coronation Stakes and finished second in both the Irish 2,000 Guineas and the Prince of Wales's Stakes. The best of his other progeny included Hot Grove (runner-up in The Derby) and Count Pahlen. Tachypous's dam Stilvi was bought by Cambanis as a yearling and became a top-class racehorse, winning the King George Stakes and Duke of York Stakes before becoming an outstanding broodmare. After Tachypous she went on to produce Tromos, Tyrnavos and Tolmi. The colt, whose name means "swift-foot" in Greek, was sent into training with Bruce Hobbs at his Palace House stables in Newmarket. He was ridden in most of his races by Geoff Lewis.

== Racing career ==
=== 1976: two-year-old season ===
On his racecourse debut Tachypous contested the Astley Maiden Stakes over five furlongs at Newmarket Racecourse in May. He drifted in the betting market from 3/1 out to 15/2 and finished eighth. In the Berkshire Stakes over the same distance at Newbury Racecourse three weeks later he faced four opponents, three of whom had already won a race. He recorded his first success he took the lead approaching the final furlong and accelerated away from his rivals to win by five lengths. Tachypous was then moved up in class and distance and started favourite for the Coventry Stakes over six furlongs at Royal Ascot in June but ran very poorly and finished unplaced behind Cawston's Clown. He was subsequently found to be suffering from a viral infection which affected many of the horses in the Hobbs stable. He had not fully recovered when he ran in the Richmond Stakes at Goodwood Racecourse at the end of July but produced a much better effort, finishing third to J O Tobin and Priors Walk.

After an absence of over two months, Tachypous returned for the Middle Park Stakes over six furlongs at Newmarket in October. Despite his lack of a recent run he had been performing impressively in training and was made the 5/1 joint favourite alongside the Michael Stoute-trained Etienne Gerard. The other runners included Nebbiolo, Mandrake Major (winner of the Flying Childers Stakes) Adviser (Sirenia Stakes) and Water Boy (runner-up in the Prix Morny) as well as the Hobbs-trained Anax who had won the Mill Reef Stakes but was reported to be significantly inferior to his stablemate. Tachypous appeared to be struggling in the early stages but began to make rapid progress in the last quarter mile. He took the lead 100 yards from the finish and won by a length from Nebbiolo with Mandrake Major third ahead of Adviser and Anax.

=== 1977: three-year-old season ===
On his three-year-old debut Tachypous contested the Greenham Stakes (a trial race for the 2000 Guineas) over seven furlongs at Newbury Racecourse in April. He raced lazily in the early stages and was beaten a length and a half by He Loves Me, to whom he was conceding five pounds. He was equipped with blinkers in training and wore them when he started 12/1 second favourite in an eighteen-runner field for the 2000 Guineas at Newmarket. He took the lead two furlongs from the finish but was overtaken in the closing stages and beaten a length by Nebbiolo with The Minstrel a length back in third. On his next appearance he ran in the St James's Palace Stakes at Royal Ascot and finished third behind Don and Maryinsky. The blinkers were left off when Tachypous was stepped up in distance and matched against older horses in the Eclipse Stakes over ten furlongs at Sandown Park Racecourse in July. He reportedly took little interest in the race and finished unplaced behind Artaius. On his final appearance the colt was sent to Scotland for the Land of Burns Stakes over ten furlongs at Ayr Racecourse. He finished second, beaten three quarters of a length by the improving three-year-old North Stoke with the four-year-old Gunner B in third place.

== Stud record ==
Tachypous was retired from racing at the end of his three-year-old season and became a breeding stallion at the Tedfold Stud at Billingshurst, West Sussex. He sired a few winners including Netsuke (runner-up in the Queen Mary Stakes) and the Listed race winner Kaid Pous.

== Assessment ==
There was no International Classification of European two-year-olds in 1976: the official handicappers of Britain, Ireland and France compiled separate rankings for horses which competed in those countries. In the British Free Handicap, Tachypous was rated the sixth best juvenile behind J O Tobin, Godswalk, Padroug, Gairloch and The Minstrel. The independent Timeform organisation gave him a rating of 128, three pounds behind their top-rated two-year-old Blushing Groom. In their annual Racehorses of 1976 Timeform described him as "England's best hope of winning the Two Thousand Guineas". In the inaugural International Clasaification of three-year-olds in 1977, Tachypous was given a rating of 83, fifteen pounds inferior to the top-rated Alleged. Timeform gave him a rating of 123, fourteen pounds behind Alleged who was their Horse of the Year.

== Pedigree ==
Pedigree of Tachypous (GB), bay stallion, 1974
Sire Hotfoot (GB) 1966	Firestreak (GB); 1956	Pardal	Pharis
Sire Hotfoot (GB) 1966	Firestreak (GB); 1956	Pardal	Adargatis
Sire Hotfoot (GB) 1966	Firestreak (GB); 1956	Hot Spell	Umidwar
Sire Hotfoot (GB) 1966	Firestreak (GB); 1956	Hot Spell	Haymaker
Sire Hotfoot (GB) 1966	Pitter Patter (GB); 1953	Kingstone	King Salmon
Sire Hotfoot (GB) 1966	Pitter Patter (GB); 1953	Kingstone	Feola
Sire Hotfoot (GB) 1966	Pitter Patter (GB); 1953	Rain	Fair Trial
Sire Hotfoot (GB) 1966	Pitter Patter (GB); 1953	Rain	Monsoon
Dam Stilvi (IRE) 1969	Derring-Do (GB); 1961	Darius	Dante
Dam Stilvi (IRE) 1969	Derring-Do (GB); 1961	Darius	Yasna
Dam Stilvi (IRE) 1969	Derring-Do (GB); 1961	Sipsey Bridge	Abernant
Dam Stilvi (IRE) 1969	Derring-Do (GB); 1961	Sipsey Bridge	Claudette
Dam Stilvi (IRE) 1969	Djerella (FR); 1960	Guersant	Bubbles
Dam Stilvi (IRE) 1969	Djerella (FR); 1960	Guersant	Montagnana
Dam Stilvi (IRE) 1969	Djerella (FR); 1960	Djeretta	Djebel
Dam Stilvi (IRE) 1969	Djerella (FR); 1960	Djeretta	Candida (Family 3-h)
