= Relkino =

British-bred Thoroughbred racehorse

- Sire: Relko
- Grandsire: Tanerko
- Dam: Pugnacity
- Damsire: Pampered King
- Sex: Stallion
- Foaled: 21 April 1973
- Country: United Kingdom
- Colour: Bay
- Breeder: Cleaboy Farms
- Owner: Lady Beaverbrook
- Trainer: Dick Hern
- Record: 16:4-4-1

Major wins
- 2000 Guineas Trial Stakes (1976); Lockinge Stakes (1977); Benson and Hedges Gold Cup (1977)

Awards
- Timeform rating 104 (1975), 123 (1976), 131 (1977)

Relkino (21 April 1973–25 December 1989) was a British Thoroughbred racehorse and sire. He was the highest-priced European yearling of his generation and won four of his sixteen races between July 1975 and October 1977. After winning one race as a two-year-old in 1975 he showed improved form in the early part of the following year, winning the 2000 Guineas Trial Stakes and finishing second to Empery in The Derby. The rest of his three-year-old career was disappointing but he reached his peak in 1977, winning the Lockinge Stakes over a mile and then recording an upset victory in the Benson and Hedges Gold Cup. After his retirement from racing, he had some success as a breeding stallion.

== Background ==
Relkino was a "very attractive, well-made" bay horse with a white blaze and a white coronet on his right front foot bred by Cleaboy Farms. He was sired by Relko, the French-trained winner of the 1963 Epsom Derby. His dam, Pugnacity, was a "grand racemare" (rated 117 by Timeform), whose wins included the Lowther Stakes, Falmouth Stakes and King George Stakes. She produced several other winners including Triumphant, who in turn produced the Irish Champion Stakes winner Timarida. As a descendant of the broodmare Ballisland, Pugnacity was a distant relative of the Irish 1,000 Guineas winner Tarascon.

As a yearling, the colt was offered for sale and bought for 58,000 guineas by the trainer Dick Hern, acting on behalf of Marcia Anastasia Christoforides, Lady Beaverbrook. The price was the highest paid at auction for any yearling in Britain in 1974. Lady Beaverbrook was considered an eccentric character who gave most of her horses names consisting of one word with seven letters (Bustino, Terimon, Boldboy, Niniski, Mystiko, Petoski), as this was the most common form for Derby winners. Relkino was sent into training with Hern at West Ilsley in Berkshire. Relkino was a very headstrong animal with a tendency to bolt: Willie Carson, who rode the horse in some of his major victories admitted that "I couldn't hold one side of him the first time I rode him work".

== Racing career ==
=== 1975: two-year-old season ===
Relkino made his debut in the Ecchinswell Maiden Stakes over six furlongs at Newbury Racecourse in July, in which he took the lead at half distance and drew away to win "very comfortably" by four lengths. A month later, over the same course and distance, he started odds-on favourite for the Washington Singer Stakes but ran poorly and finished last of the five runners behind Lady Beaverbrook's other runner Homeboy.

=== 1976: three-year-old season ===
On his three-year-old debut, Relkino won the 2000 Guineas Trial Stakes at Ascot Racecourse in April, leading from the start to beat the Reg Akehurst-trained Loh by three-quarters of a length. In May he contested the 2000 Guineas over the Rowley Mile at Newmarket Racecourse and finished sixth of the seventeen runners behind Wollow, Vitiges, Thieving Demon, Patris and Frankie. On 2 June 1976, Relkino was one of twenty-three runners for the 197th running of the Derby Stakes at Epsom Downs Racecourse. Starting a 25/1 outsider he was among the leaders from the start, turned into the straight in third place behind Vitiges and moved to the front approaching the final quarter mile. He maintained his advantage until the final furlong, when he was overtaken by the French-trained Empery and finished second, three lengths behind the winner and a head in front of Oats.

The rest of Relkino's second season was disappointing. He finished unplaced behind the subsequently disqualified Trepan in the Eclipse Stakes in which he appeared to be "thoroughly outpaced" and then finished fifth behind Hawkberry in the Great Voltigeur Stakes at York Racecourse. In the latter race he led in the straight but dropped away quickly after being headed a furlong and a half from the finish. In the Valdoe Stakes at Goodwood Racecourse in September, he was beaten a length by Obstacle, a three-year-old colt trained by Henry Candy, to whom he was conceding nine pounds. On his final appearance of the season, Relkino was badly-drawn in stall 1 for the Champion Stakes at Newmarket and finished eleventh of the twenty runners behind Vitiges.

=== 1977: four-year-old season ===
Relkino began his third season in the Westbury Stakes over ten furlongs at Sandown Park Racecourse in April, in which he led from the start, setting a very fast pace, before being overtaken in the closing stages and finishing second by three quarters of a length to the Henry Cecil-trained Lucky Wednesday. He was then dropped in distance for the Lockinge Stakes over one mile at Newbury in May in which he was ridden by Willie Carson and started at odds of 4/1. He was among the leaders from the start and got the better of a prolonged struggle with Jellaby and Thieving Demon to record his first win in over a year. In the Diomed Stakes at Epsom in June, Relkino finished sixth in an unsatisfactory race in which he was forced into the rails and repeatedly bitten by the subsequently disqualified Marinsky. He continued to campaign over a mile, but was well-beaten when finishing fourth to Jellaby in the Queen Anne Stakes after disputing the early lead. In the Sussex Stakes at Goodwood in July he was beaten again, finishing third to the Eclipse Stakes winner Artaius.

In August started a 33/1 outsider for the sixth running of the Benson and Hedges Gold Cup over ten and a half furlongs at York Racecourse, with the betting being headed by Artaius. The other runners included the previously undefeated French colt Lightning, the Hardwicke Stakes winner Orange Bay, the Irish Derby winner Malacate, and the Irish 1,000 Guineas winner Sarah Siddons. The race also attracted Smuzka and Negros, two Polish horses who were the first horses from behind the Iron Curtain to race in Britain. Willie Carson settled the colt toward the middle of the field as Artaius and Negros disputed the early lead. Relkino moved forward in the straight, overtook Artaius approaching the final furlong and accelerated away to win by four lengths with Orange Bay finishing third. As in the previous year, Relkino ended his season with a run in the Champion Stakes, but produced a much better performance. Restrained towards the back of the eight-runner field he moved forward in the final quarter mile to contest the lead with Arctic Tern, North Stoke and Flying Water. He was unable to withstand the finishing burst of Flying Water and finished second, two lengths behind the winner and two and a half lengths ahead of North Stoke in third.

== Assessment ==
In 1975, Relkino was not awarded a weight in the British Free Handicap, a ranking of the best two-year-olds to race in the United Kingdom, which was headed by Wollow. He was given a rating of 104 by the independent Timeform organisation, twenty-six pounds below their top-rated juvenile Manado. In the following year, Relkino was rated sixteen pounds inferior to Vitiges in the British Free Handicap for three-year-olds. He was given a rating of 123 by Timeform, twelve pounds behind their Horse of the Year Youth: in their annual Racehorse of 1976, Timeform commented that the colt seemed to be "no longer as keen on racing as he was". In the inaugural International Classification in 1977, Relkino was rated equal with Exceller as the sixth-best older horse in Europe behind Balmerino, Orange Bay, Buckskin, Gentilhombre and Sagaro. Timeform gave him a rating of 131, two pounds behind their top-rated older male Balmerino.

== Stud career ==
In the autumn of 1977, following his win at York, Relkino was syndicated at £8,000 a share, giving him a theoretical value of £320,000. He began his stud career in 1978 at the Barton Stud at Bury St Edmunds in Suffolk and was later based at Chris Sweetings' Conduit Stud near Chipping Norton in Oxfordshire. He had limited success as a sire of flat racers, with the best of his offspring being the Scottish Derby winner Dazari. He was more successful as a National Hunt stallion, siring Relkeel a three-time of the Bula Hurdle who was described by David Nicholson as "the best horse I ever trained", as well as Arctic Kinsman (Supreme Novices' Hurdle) and Buckhouse Boy (Rendlesham Hurdle). His last foals were born in 1990.

== Pedigree ==
Pedigree of Relkino, bay stallion, 1973
Sire Relko (GB) 1960	Tanerko (FR); 1953	Tantieme	Deux Pour Cent
Sire Relko (GB) 1960	Tanerko (FR); 1953	Tantieme	Terka
Sire Relko (GB) 1960	Tanerko (FR); 1953	La Divine	Fair Copy
Sire Relko (GB) 1960	Tanerko (FR); 1953	La Divine	La Diva
Sire Relko (GB) 1960	Relance (FR); 1952	Relic	War Relic
Sire Relko (GB) 1960	Relance (FR); 1952	Relic	Bridal Colors
Sire Relko (GB) 1960	Relance (FR); 1952	Polaire	Le Volcan
Sire Relko (GB) 1960	Relance (FR); 1952	Polaire	Stella Polaris
Dam Pugnacity (GB) 1962	Pampered King (GB); 1954	Prince Chevalier	Prince Rose
Dam Pugnacity (GB) 1962	Pampered King (GB); 1954	Prince Chevalier	Chevalerie
Dam Pugnacity (GB) 1962	Pampered King (GB); 1954	Netherton Maid	Nearco
Dam Pugnacity (GB) 1962	Pampered King (GB); 1954	Netherton Maid	Phase
Dam Pugnacity (GB) 1962	Ballynulta (GB); 1953	Djebel	Tourbillon
Dam Pugnacity (GB) 1962	Ballynulta (GB); 1953	Djebel	Loika
Dam Pugnacity (GB) 1962	Ballynulta (GB); 1953	Ballisland	The Phoenix
Dam Pugnacity (GB) 1962	Ballynulta (GB); 1953	Ballisland	Aherlow (Family 13-e)
