= Fürstenberg-Rennen =

- Class: Group 3
- Location: Iffezheim Racecourse; Baden-Baden, Germany
- Inaugurated: 1880
- Race type: Flat / Thoroughbred
- Website: Baden-Baden

Race information
- Distance: 2,000 metres (1¼ miles)
- Surface: Turf
- Track: Left-handed
- Qualification: Three-year-olds and up
- Weight: 57 kg Allowances; 1½ kg for fillies 1 kg if not won €12,000; Penalties; 3 kg for Group 1 winners 2 kg for Group 2 winners 1 kg for Group 3 winners
- Purse: €55,000 (2012); 1st: €32,000

The Fürstenberg-Rennen is a Group 3 flat horse race in Germany open to thoroughbreds aged three years or older. It is run at a variety of German racecourses, over a distance of 2,000 metres (about 1¼ miles), and it is scheduled to take place each year in August. The race was run at Baden-Baden until 2010.

== History ==
The event was established in 1880, and it was originally contested over 2,400 metres. For a period it was known as the Preis von Iffezheim.

The distance of the race was modified several times during the early 1900s. It began a spell over 2,200 metres in 1957.

The present race grading system was introduced in Germany in 1972, and the Fürstenberg-Rennen was given Group 3 status. It was cut to 2,000 metres in 2001.

The event was titled the Belmondo-Preis in 2010. It was held at Hanover as the Grosser Preis des Audi Zentrums Hannover in 2011.

The race was run over 2,100 metres at Düsseldorf in 2012, and on this occasion it was called the Grosser Sparkassenpreis.

== Records ==
Leading jockey (5 wins):

- Andrasch Starke – Hibiscus (1999), Pryor (2001), Willingly (2002), Day Walker (2005), Elle Shadow (2010), Be My Sheriff (2020), Adrian (2021), India (2022, 2023)

Leading trainer (7 wins):

- Sven von Mitzlaff – Ordinate (1959), Kaiseradler (1960), Sudan (1962), Celia (1963), Nachtflug (1965), Lilie (1969), Caracol (1972)
- Heinz Jentzsch – Lombard (1970), Monzeno (1975), Anno (1982), Lirung (1985), El Salto (1986), Zampano (1987), Solon (1995)

(note: the trainers of some of the early winners are unknown)

== Winners from 1969 at Baden-Baden ==
Year	Winner	Jockey	Trainer	Time
1969	Lilie	Harro Remmert	Sven von Mitzlaff	2:23.50
1970	Lombard	Fritz Drechsler	Heinz Jentzsch	2:16.00
1971	Dulcia	Joan Pall	Hein Bollow	2:18.70
1972	Caracol	Oskar Langner	Sven von Mitzlaff	2:20.40
1973	Horst-Herbert	Peter Remmert	Hein Bollow	2:19.60
1974	Tannenhorst	Horst Horwart	Heinz Gummelt	2:16.30
1975	Monzeno	Joan Pall	Heinz Jentzsch	2:16.40
1976	Tuttlinger	Eric Eldin	Arthur-Paul Schlaefke	2:15.20
1977	North Stoke	Ron Hutchinson	John Dunlop	2:20.50
1978	Nelusko	José Orihuel	Hein Bollow	2:19.40
1979	Girlandajo	Dave Richardson	Arthur-Paul Schlaefke	2:17.10
1980	Ludovico	Peter Remmert	Harro Remmert	2:15.80
1981	Ti Amo	Heinz-Peter Ludewig	Franz-Felix Schreiner	2:15.80
1982	Anno	Georg Bocskai	Heinz Jentzsch	2:19.50
1983	Harly	Brian Rouse	John Dunlop	2:16.60
1984	Romana	Lutz Mäder	Hein Bollow	2:15.10
1985	Lirung	Georg Bocskai	Heinz Jentzsch	2:20.20
1986	El Salto	Georg Bocskai	Heinz Jentzsch	2:18.80
1987	Zampano	Georg Bocskai	Heinz Jentzsch	2:16.50
1988	Carroll House	Bruce Raymond	Michael Jarvis	2:19.40
1989	Premier Amour	Olivier Poirier	Robert Collet	2:22.39
1990	Erdelistan	Tony Cruz	Alain de Royer-Dupré	2:19.83
1991	Tao	Lester Piggott	Andreas Wöhler	2:18.62
1992	Non Partisan	Paul Eddery	André Fabre	2:16.73
1993	Sternkönig	Neil Grant	Theo Grieper	2:13.53
1994	Twen	Peter Schiergen	Harro Remmert	2:17.98
1995	Solon	Peter Schiergen	Heinz Jentzsch	2:18.50
1996	Wurftaube	Kevin Woodburn	Harro Remmert	2:16.18
1997	March Groom	Andreas Suborics	Attila Friebert	2:16.13
1998	Indikator	Andreas Boschert	Andreas Wöhler	2:16.89
1999	Hibiscus	Andrasch Starke	Andreas Schütz	2:18.86
2000	Sword Local	Andreas Suborics	Mario Hofer	2:25.03
2001	Pryor	Andrasch Starke	Andreas Schütz	2:02.17
2002	Willingly	Andrasch Starke	Michael Trybuhl	2:05.15
2003	Big Bad Bob	Pat Eddery	John Dunlop	2:03.40
2004	Lyonels Glory	Andreas Suborics	Urs Suter	2:06.25
2005	Day Walker	Andrasch Starke	Andreas Schütz	2:02.23
2006	Waleria	Andreas Suborics	Hans-Jürgen Gröschel	2:10.72
2007	Persian Storm	Terence Hellier	Jens Hirschberger	2:02.61
2008	Liang Kay	Terence Hellier	Uwe Ostmann	2:11.42
2009	Toughness Danon	Jozef Bojko	Andreas Wöhler	2:04.48
2010	Elle Shadow	Andrasch Starke	Peter Schiergen	2:06.26

== Winners since 2011 ==
Year	Course	Winner	Jockey	Trainer	Time
2011	Hanover	Theo Danon	Filip Minarik	Peter Schiergen	2:02.41
2012	Düsseldorf	Andolini ^{[b]}	Eduardo Pedroza	Andreas Wöhler	2:08.88
2013	Hanover	Limario	Ted Durcan	R Dzubasz	1:57.99
2014	Krefeld	Eric	Stephen Hellyn	C Von Der Recke	2:09.13
2015	Krefeld	Palace Prince	Eddy Hardouin	Andreas Lowe	2:07.62
2016	Hanover	Wai Key Star	Eduardo Pedroza	Andreas Wohler	2:10.35
2017	Hanover	Real Value	Fabrice Veron	Mario Hofer	2:10.47
2018	Düsseldorf	Destino	Martin Seidl	Markus Klug	2:24.70
2019	Düsseldorf	Bristano	Filip Minarik	M G Mintchev	2:25.82
2020	Hoppegarten	Be My Sheriff	Andrasch Starke	Henk Grewe	2:33.20
2021	Hoppegarten	Adrian	Andrasch Starke	Henk Grewe	2:31.47
2022	Hoppegarten	India	Andrasch Starke	Waldemar Hickst	2:32.56
2023	Hoppegarten	India	Andrasch Starke	Waldemar Hickst	2:31.10
2024	Hoppegarten	Best Of Lips	Hugo Boutin	Andreas Suborics	2:28.92
2025	Hoppegarten	Padre Palou	Thore Hammer Hansen	Henk Grewe	2:29.67
2026	Hoppegarten	Nastaria	Jozef Bojko	Frau Anna Schleusner-Fruhriep	2:30.54

== Earlier winners ==
- 1880: Kaleb
- 1881: Wildschütz
- 1882: Tittle Tattle
- 1883: Maria
- 1884: Cambus
- 1885: Triftig
- 1886: Dictator
- 1887: Lucretia
- 1888: Wallfahrt
- 1889: Fledermaus
- 1890: Barde
- 1891: Tambour-Major
- 1892: Nora
- 1893: Ilse
- 1894: Königskrone
- 1895: Armbruster
- 1896: Armbruster
- 1897: Geranium
- 1898: Nicosia
- 1899: Gobseck
- 1900: Winfried
- 1901: Slanderer
- 1902: Nordlandfahrer
- 1903: La Chine
- 1904: Macdonald II
- 1905: Phoenix
- 1906: Derby Cup / Hammurabi *
- 1907: Sejan
- 1908: Faust
- 1909: Frere Luce
- 1910: Maboul
- 1911: Royal Flower
- 1912: Sarrasin
- 1913: Cyklon
- 1914–20: no race
- 1921: Chrysolith
- 1922: Alpenrose
- 1923: Ganelon
- 1924: Rosalba Carriera
- 1925: Weissdorn
- 1926: Naplopo
- 1927: Oleander
- 1928: Castel Sardo
- 1929: Tantris
- 1930: Alba
- 1931: Wolkenflug
- 1932: Ostermädel
- 1933: Unkenruf
- 1934: Ehrenpreis
- 1935: Contessina
- 1936: Wahnfried
- 1937: Gaio
- 1938: Procle
- 1939: Octavianus
- 1940: no race
- 1941: Nuvolari
- 1942: Aureolus
- 1943–51: no race
- 1952: Leidenschaft
- 1953: Salut
- 1954: Makra
- 1955: Masetto
- 1956: Bernardus
- 1957: Nisos
- 1958: Aletsch
- 1959: Ordinate
- 1960: Kaiseradler
- 1961: Arardo
- 1962: Sudan
- 1963: Celia
- 1964: Marinus
- 1965: Nachtflug
- 1966: Sawara
- 1967: Bussard
- 1968: Seebirk

* The 1906 race was a dead-heat and has joint winners.

== See also ==
- List of German flat horse races
