= Orange Bay (horse) =

British-bred Thoroughbred racehorse

- Sire: Canisbay
- Grandsire: Doutelle
- Dam: Orange Triumph
- Damsire: Molvedo
- Sex: Stallion
- Foaled: 1972
- Country: United Kingdom
- Colour: Bay
- Owner: Carlo Vittadini
- Trainer: Mario Benetti; Peter Walwyn
- Record: 21:9–4–4

Major wins
- Premio Emanuele Filiberto (1975); Derby Italiano (1975); Jockey Club Stakes (1976); Hardwicke Stakes (1976); Cumberland Lodge Stakes (1977)

Awards
- Timeform rating 123 (1975), 129 (1976), 131 (1977); Top-rated European Older Horse (1977)

Orange Bay (foaled 1972) was a British-bred Thoroughbred racehorse and sire. He was originally trained in Italy, where he was one of the leading colts of his generation in 1974 and 1975, winning the Premio Emanuele Filiberto and the Derby Italiano and being placed in the Gran Criterium, Gran Premio d'Italia and Gran Premio di Milano. He was moved to England in the late summer of his three-year-old season and subsequently emerged as one of the leading middle distance horses in Europe. In 1976 he won the Jockey Club Stakes and Hardwicke Stakes and finished a close third in the King George VI and Queen Elizabeth Stakes, In the following year he won the Cumberland Lodge Stakes and produced his best effort when beaten a short head by The Minstrel in the King George VI and Queen Elizabeth Stakes. He was retired from racing at the end of 1977 to become a breeding stallion but made no impact as a sire of winners.

== Background ==
Orange Bay was an exceptionally good-looking bay horse with no white markings bred in the United Kingdom by his owner Dr Carlo Vittadini (1915–2007). He was from the last crop of foals sired in Britain by the Eclipse Stakes winner Canisbay, who was then exported to Italy. Orange Bay's dam, Orange Triumph, failed to win a race, but came from an established Italian family, being a granddaughter of the Oaks d'Italia winner Fior d'Orchidea whose other descendants included Ovac (Premio Parioli), Oise (Gran Premio di Milano, Orsa Maggiore (Oaks d'Italia, Gran Premio di Milano), Premio Roma) and Orvieto (Gran Criterium). The colt was sent into training with Mario Benetti in Italy.

== Racing career ==
=== 1974: two-year-old season ===
Racing in Italy, Orange Bay won his first two races over 1400 metres and 1500 metres. He was then moved up in class to contest Italy's most prestigious race for two-year-olds, the Group One Gran Criterium over 1500 metres at the San Siro Racecourse in Milan. He appeared an unlucky loser as he finished second to Start.

=== 1975: three-year-old season ===
After finishing second on his debut as a three-year-old, Orange Bay won the Group Two Premio Emanuele Filiberto over 2000 metres in Milan on 20 April, beating the British-trained Hobnob (later to win the Dante Stakes) by two lengths. On 11 May he started the 4/5 favourite for the Derby Italiano over 2400 metres at the Capannelle Racecourse in Rome and won by three lengths from Pierre Curie with Manolo Borromeo five lengths away in third. Orange Bay started 1/2 favourite for the Gran Premio d'Italia in Milan on 1 June, but finished second, beaten a short neck by Laodemonte. In the Gran Premio di Milano two weeks later, Orange Bay was matched against older horses for the first time and finished fourth behind Star Appeal, Duke of Marmalade and Un Kopeck, with Dahlia in fifth. He was promoted to third after Un Kopeck was disqualified following a stewards' inquiry. He was then relocated to England and entered the stable of Peter Walwyn at Lambourn in Berkshire. On his first appearance for his new trainer, Orange Bay won a minor race at Windsor Racecourse in September.

=== 1976: four-year-old season ===
Orange Bay made very good physical progress in the winter of 1976/7 and looked impressive when he made his debut in the Earl of Sefton Stakes at Newmarket Racecourse in April. Racing over an inadequate distance he finished third behind Chil The Kite and Dominion, conceding weight to both horses. In April, ridden by Pat Eddery, he started at odds of 3/1 for the Jockey Club Stakes over 1 1/2 miles at the same course. He won narrowly from Libra's Rib and Dakota, to both of whom he was conceding seven pounds. Despite the colt's success, Walwyn felt that he had been unsuited by the slow pace and was capable of better.

At Royal Ascot in June, Orange Bay was matched against the 1975 St Leger Stakes winner Bruni in the Hardwicke Stakes for which he started at odds of 9/2. Eddery tracked Libra's Rib before taking the lead half a mile from the finish and maintained his advantage until the final furlong when he was overtaken by Bruni. Orange Bay rallied strongly to regain the advantage in the final strides and won by a head. Orange Bay was then moved up to the highest level for Britain's most important weight-for-age race, the King George VI and Queen Elizabeth Stakes at Ascot in July. Restrained by Eddery in the early stages, Orange Bay produced a sustained run in the straight and finished third, beaten a length and a head by Pawneese and Bruni. Eddery claimed that Orange Bay had been hampered when Youth ran wide on the final turn, but this view was not widely accepted.

In September, Orange Bay was sent to Germany for the Grosser Preis von Baden but ran very poorly on heavy ground and finished unplaced behind the locally trained three-year-old Sharper. Orange Bay was prepared for a run in the Prix de l'Arc de Triomphe but did not contest the race, reportedly because Walwyn did not want to run the horse on very soft ground.

=== 1977: five-year-old season ===
Orange Bay's form in the early part of 1977 was not particularly impressive. He finished fourth behind Decent Fellow in the John Porter Stakes at Newbury Racecourse in April over 1 1/2 miles and then won the Aston Park Stakes over 13 1/2 furlongs at the same course a month later, having to be hard ridden to prevail by a length from Laomedonte (Timeform rating 113). At Royal Ascot he attempted to win the Hardwicke Stakes for the second time but finished unplaced behind Meneval. Timeform described his performance in the last-named race as "abysmal".

Orange Bay was equipped with blinkers for the first time when he contested the King George VI and Queen Elizabeth Stakes for the second time. Starting a 20/1 outsider he raced just behind the leaders in third place before turning into the straight in third place and overtaking Mart Lane to take the lead two furlong from the finish. He looked the likely winner before being challenged and headed by The Derby winner The Minstrel inside the final furlong but rallied strongly in the final strides and was beaten only a short head by the three-year-old. Exceller finished third ahead of Crystal Palace, Norfolk Air, Lucky Wednesday and Bruni. The horse wore the same headgear in his remaining three races. In August, Orange Bay was brought back in distance for the Benson and Hedges Gold Cup over 10 1/2 furlongs at York Racecourse and finished third behind Relkino and Artaius. He was then theoretically dropped in class for the Cumberland Lodge Stakes over 1 1/2 miles at Ascot in September a race which also attracted Meneval and the Epsom Derby runner-up Hot Grove. Starting the 11/8 favourite he took the lead after half a mile and was never seriously challenged, winning by four lengths from Meneval.

Orange Bay's final race was the 1977 Prix de l'Arc de Triomphe for which he started 8/1 second favourite. In a slowly-run race he was among the leaders from the start but was unable to quicken in the straight and dropped away to finish seventeenth of the twenty-six runners behind Alleged. In their annual Racehorses of 1977 Timeform were critical of Eddery's tactics, arguing that he should have sent the horse to the front and set a stronger pace.

== Assessment ==
Orange Bay was rated the second best two-year-old in Italy (level with Bolkonski) in 1974. In the following year the independent Timeform organisation awarded him a rating of 123 and described him as "one to keep an eye on". In 1976, Orange Bay was rated the third-best horse in Britain, level with Bruni and Lochnager and two pounds behind Sagaro and Vitiges. Timeform awarded him a rating of 129, six pounds below their Horse of the Year, Youth. Orange Bay received a peak Timeform rating of 131 in 1978, six pounds behind Alleged. In the inaugural International Classification, Orange Bay was rated the best older horse (alongside Balmerino) and the fourth-best horse in Europe behind Alleged, Blushing Groom and The Minstrel.

== Stud record ==
Orange Bay was retired from racing to become a breeding stallion, with an estimated value of £168,000 and started his stud career at Beech House Stud in Newmarket. He had little success, although one of his daughters, Ina Seville, finished second in the Prix des Chênes. He was later exported to stand in Poland where his last reported foals were born in 1991.

== Pedigree ==
Pedigree of Orange Bay, bay stallion, 1972
Sire Canisbay (GB) 1961	Doutelle (GB); 1954	Prince Chevalier*	Prince Rose*
Sire Canisbay (GB) 1961	Doutelle (GB); 1954	Prince Chevalier*	Chevalerie*
Sire Canisbay (GB) 1961	Doutelle (GB); 1954	Above Board	Straight Deal
Sire Canisbay (GB) 1961	Doutelle (GB); 1954	Above Board	Feola
Sire Canisbay (GB) 1961	Stroma (GB); 1955	Luminary	Fair Trial
Sire Canisbay (GB) 1961	Stroma (GB); 1955	Luminary	Luciebella
Sire Canisbay (GB) 1961	Stroma (GB); 1955	Whoa Emma	Prince Chevalier*
Sire Canisbay (GB) 1961	Stroma (GB); 1955	Whoa Emma	Ready
Dam Orange Triumph (GB) 1965	Molvedo (ITY); 1958	Ribot	Tenerani
Dam Orange Triumph (GB) 1965	Molvedo (ITY); 1958	Ribot	Romanella
Dam Orange Triumph (GB) 1965	Molvedo (ITY); 1958	Maggiolina	Nakamuro
Dam Orange Triumph (GB) 1965	Molvedo (ITY); 1958	Maggiolina	Murcia
Dam Orange Triumph (GB) 1965	Orange (ITY); 1954	Dante	Nearco
Dam Orange Triumph (GB) 1965	Orange (ITY); 1954	Dante	Rosy Legend
Dam Orange Triumph (GB) 1965	Orange (ITY); 1954	Fior d'Orchidea	Apelle
Dam Orange Triumph (GB) 1965	Orange (ITY); 1954	Fior d'Orchidea	Osa (Family: 16-c)

* Orange Bay is inbred 3S x 4S to the stallion Prince Chevalier, meaning that he appears third generation and fourth generation on the sire side of his pedigree.
