= Vitiges (horse) =

French-bred Thoroughbred racehorse

Vitigès
- Sire: Phaeton
- Grandsire: Sicambre
- Dam: Valé
- Damsire: Verrières
- Sex: Stallion
- Foaled: 22 March 1973
- Country: France
- Colour: Chestnut
- Breeder: Hervé de la Héronnière
- Owner: Mrs Marc Laloum
- Trainer: Gérard Philippeau; Peter Walwyn
- Record: 18:6-4-1

Major wins
- Prix Robert Papin (1975); Prix Morny (1975); Prix Djebel (1976); Champion Stakes (1976)

Awards
- Top-rated British three-year-old (1976); Timeform rating 128 (1975), 132 (1976), 115 § (1977)

Vitigès (22 March 1973 – after 1987) was a French-bred Thoroughbred racehorse and sire. He was one of the best French-trained two-year-olds of 1976 when he won four races including the Prix Robert Papin and Prix Morny, as well as finishing second in the Prix de la Salamandre. In the following year he won the Prix Djebel and finished second in both the 2000 Guineas and the Prix Jacques Le Marois before being transferred to be trained in England. In October 1976 he recorded his greatest success when recording an upset win over a strong field in the Champion Stakes which led to his being rated the best three-year-old to race in the United Kingdom that year. He ran without success as a four-year-old and was retired to stud, where he had some success as a breeding stallion.

== Background ==
Vitigès was a chestnut horse with a white star and white socks on his hind legs bred in France by Hervé de la Héronnière. He was the best horse sired by Phaëton, an Irish-bred grey stallion best known for winning the Grand Prix de Paris in 1967. Vitigès' dam Valé, won at least two races and produced several other winners including Virunga, who finished third behind Allez France and Dahlia in the Prix de Diane. As a granddaughter of the broodmare Calluna, Valé was related to many other good winners including Athens Wood, Bolkonski, Dibidale (Irish Oaks, Yorkshire Oaks), Tony Bin and Viva Pataca. As a yearling, Vitiges was sold for ₣72,000 and entered the ownership of Mrs Marc Laloum. The colt was sent into training with Gérard Philippeau at Maisons-Laffitte in France.

== Racing career ==
=== 1975: two-year-old season ===
After finishing second on his debut, Vitiges won two minor races before being moved up in class to contest the Group One Prix Robert Papin over 1100 metres at Maisons-Laffitte Racecourse on 27 July. Ridden by Gérard Rivases, he started at odds of 10.5/1 in a field of thirteen which included challengers from Italy, England and Germany. Racing down the centre of the course, he took the lead 200 metres from the finish and drew away to win by three lengths from the British-trained filly Western Jewel, with Policrock in third and Roan Star in fourth. Three weeks later, Vitiges started 7/5 favourite for the Group One Prix Morny over 1200 metres at Deauville Racecourse in which his main rival in the betting was the François Boutin-trained Manado, who had won the Prix Yacowlef by eight lengths on his only previous start. Vitiges took the lead soon after the start but was soon challenged by Manado and the two colts disputed the lead, before the latter swerved to the left and collided with the rail 400 metres from the finish. Vitiges increased his advantage in the closing stages and won by two and a half lengths from the filly Imogene. On 14 September, the colt started the 4/5 favourite for the Prix de la Salamandre over 1400 metres on soft ground at Longchamp Racecourse. He led from the start and went two lengths clear in the straight, but weakened in the closing stages and was beaten a length into second place by Manado. The Australian jockey Bill Pyers took over the ride on Vitiges when the colt contested France's premier race for two-year-olds, the Grand Critérium over 1600 metres at Longchamp on 5 October. In a change of tactic, he was restrained in the early stages before moving forward on the final turn but was unable to maintain his challenge and finished fifth of the eleven runners behind Manado, one place ahead of the future Epsom Derby winner Empery.

=== 1976: three-year-old season ===
Vitiges began his second season in the Prix Greffulhe over 2100 metres at Longchamp on 4 April. He was in contention until half way but then tired badly on the soft ground and finished last of the nine runners more than twenty lengths behind the winner Youth. Five days later he was dropped back in distance for the 1400 metre Prix Djebel on good ground at Maisons-Laffitte in which he was matched against Manado for the third time. Manado started odds-on favourite but Vitiges, ridden a usual by Rivases, won by a length at odds of 5.2/1. On his next appearance Vitiges was sent to England for the 2000 Guineas at Newmarket for which he started third favourite behind Wollow and Manado in a field of seventeen runners. He took the lead from the start and maintained his advantage before being overtaken by Wollow in the final quarter mile and finished second, beaten one and a half lengths.

Vitiges returned to England for his next race and was moved up in distance for the 197th running of the Derby Stakes over one and a half lengths at Epsom Downs Racecourse. The colt went to the front and held the lead until two furlongs from the finish. He was overtaken by Relkino and Empery and weakened in the final furlong to finish sixth of the twenty-three runners behind Empery, Relkino, Oats, Hawkberry and Wollow. On 18 July, Vitiges started the 5.2/1 third favourite for the Prix Eugène Adam over 2000 metres at Saint-Cloud Racecourse but finished sixth of the fourteen runners, five and a half lengths behind the winner Crow. The colt was dropped back in distance and matched against older horses for the first time in the Prix Jacques Le Marois at Deauville. The race resulted in a blanket finish, with the first seven horses crossing the finish line together and Vitiges dead heating for second with Radetzky a head behind Gravelines, just ahead of Manado, Ellora and Avaray.

In September, Vitiges was dropped back even further in distance for the Prix de Seine-et-Oise over 1200 metres at Maisons-Laffitte. Racing against specialist sprinters, he started favourite but after leading for 1000 metres he was overtaken and finished fourth of the ten runners behind Kala Shikari, Raga Navarro and Mendip Man. The colt was then removed from Philippeau's stable and sent to be trained in England by Peter Walwyn at Seven Barrows near Lambourn in Berkshire. As soon as he arrived at Walwyn's stable, the colt was equipped with a softer bit which enabled him to be settled more effectively. In October, Vitiges, ridden by the first time by the Irish jockey Pat Eddery started a 22/1 outsider for the Champion Stakes over ten furlongs at Newmarket. The eighteen-runner field was a strong one, including Crow, Wollow, Rose Bowl, Malacate, and Northern Treasure. The field split into two groups on either side of the wide Rowley mile straight, with Vitiges racing in the smaller group on the far side (the right side of the course from the jockeys' point of view). Vitiges' stable companion Red Regent led the far side group before being overtaken by Rose Bowl, with Vitiges making progress from the two furlong mark. In the final furlong it became apparent that the runners on the far side were well ahead of the stands-side group as Vitiges steadily wore down Rose Bowl. Vitiges took the lead in the final strides and beat Rose Bowl by a neck with Northern Treasure two and a half lengths back in third.

=== 1977: four-year-old season ===
Vitiges remained in training with Walwyn as a four-year-old but never recovered his previous form in three races. He finished fourth behind the filly Heaven Knows in the Earl of Sefton Stakes at Newmarket in April and then ran tenth of the twelve runners behind Arctic Tern in the Prix Ganay on 1 May. Later that month he was equipped with blinkers in the Clive Graham Stakes at Goodwood Racecourse but showed no improvement as he finished third behind Lucky Wednesday and Norfolk Air.

== Assessment ==
There was no International Classification of European two-year-olds in 1975: the official handicappers of Britain, Ireland and France compiled separate rankings for horses which competed in those countries. In the French Free Handicap, Vitiges was rated the second best juvenile of the season, two pounds behind Manado. The independent Timeform organisation concurred, giving him a rating of 128, two pounds below Manado and one ahead of the top British colt Wollow. In 1976, the official handicappers of Britain and France again produced separate ratings. In the French handicap, Vitiges was rated the seventh best three-year-old colt behind Youth, Crow, Empery, Exceller, Malacate and Twig Moss. The British handicapper, however, rated Vitiges the best three-year-old of 1976, ahead of Pawneese, Wollow, Crow and Empery. Timeform gave him a rating of 132, placing him alongside Wollow and the sprinter Lochnager as the third best horse of the year behind Youth and Crow. In 1977 Timeform gave him a rating of 115 §, with the § (or "squiggle") indicating a horse who is "ungenerous, faint-hearted or a bit of a coward".

== Stud career ==
In the autumn of 1976, it was announced that Vitiges had been syndicated at £23,000 a share (giving him a theoretical value of £960,000) and would begin his stallion career at the Someries Stud at Newmarket in 1978. In fact, he began his stud career earlier than expected, covering several mares at the end of his abbreviated 1977 season. He was exported to Japan in 1986.

The most successful of his offspring was Moon Madness, who won ten races including the St Leger Stakes and the Grand Prix de Saint-Cloud. His other good winners included New Bruce Prix de la Côte Normande and Tants Lingfield Oaks Trial.

== Pedigree ==
Pedigree of Vitiges, chestnut stallion, 1973
Sire Phaeton (IRE) 1964	Sicambre (FR); 1948	Prince Bio	Prince Rose*
Sire Phaeton (IRE) 1964	Sicambre (FR); 1948	Prince Bio	Biologie
Sire Phaeton (IRE) 1964	Sicambre (FR); 1948	Sif	Rialto
Sire Phaeton (IRE) 1964	Sicambre (FR); 1948	Sif	Suavita
Sire Phaeton (IRE) 1964	Pasquinade (FR); 1957	Vandale	Plassy
Sire Phaeton (IRE) 1964	Pasquinade (FR); 1957	Vandale	Vanille
Sire Phaeton (IRE) 1964	Pasquinade (FR); 1957	Mademoiselle Paganini	Loliondo
Sire Phaeton (IRE) 1964	Pasquinade (FR); 1957	Mademoiselle Paganini	Mademoiselle Petipas
Dam Vale (FR) 1959	Verrieres (FR); 1953	Palestine	Fair Trial
Dam Vale (FR) 1959	Verrieres (FR); 1953	Palestine	Una
Dam Vale (FR) 1959	Verrieres (FR); 1953	Serre Chaude	Pharis
Dam Vale (FR) 1959	Verrieres (FR); 1953	Serre Chaude	Vanda Teres
Dam Vale (FR) 1959	Calliopsis (GB); 1954	Prince Chevalier	Prince Rose*
Dam Vale (FR) 1959	Calliopsis (GB); 1954	Prince Chevalier	Chevalerie
Dam Vale (FR) 1959	Calliopsis (GB); 1954	Calluna	Hyperion
Dam Vale (FR) 1959	Calliopsis (GB); 1954	Calluna	Campanula (Family 19-b)

* Vitiges is inbred 4S x 4D to the stallion Prince Rose, meaning that he appears fourth generation on the sire side of his pedigree and fourth generation on the dam side of his pedigree.
