= 1977 Prix de l'Arc de Triomphe =

- Location: Longchamp Racecourse
- Date: October 2, 1977
- Winning horse: Alleged

The 1977 Prix de l'Arc de Triomphe was a horse race held at Longchamp on Sunday 2 October 1977. It was the 56th running of the Prix de l'Arc de Triomphe.

The winner was Alleged, a three-year-old colt trained in Ireland by Vincent O'Brien and ridden by Lester Piggott. Alleged became the fourth Irish-trained horse to win the race twice after Ballymoss (also trained by O'Brien) in 1957 and Levmoss in 1970. Piggott had previously won the race on Rheingold in 1973.

== The contenders ==
The favourite for the race was Alleged, who had won four of his five races including the Royal Whip Stakes, Gallinule Stakes and Great Voltigeur Stakes. His main rivals in the betting were the British filly Dunfermline, who had inflicted Alleged's only defeat in the St Leger Stakes, the Prix du Jockey Club winner Crystal Palace, the four-year-old Crow, and the five-year-old Orange Bay. The best of the other French contenders appeared to be Malacate (Irish Derby), Kamicia (Prix Vermeille) and Fabuleux Jane. The international entry included the New Zealand-bred, British-trained Balmerino, Mia from Argentina, Cunning Trick from the United States and Vivi from Germany. Alleged started at odds of 3.9/1 ahead of Crystal Palace, Dunfermline and Orange Bay on 8/1 and Crow on 19/2.

== The race ==
Piggott sent Alleged into the lead from the start and set a steady pace with Crystal Palace, Crow and Orange Bay close behind. With no designated pacemakers and none of the recognised stayers making any attempt to challenge for the lead, the Irish colt was allowed to dictate the pace and on the downhill run towards the turn into the straight he led from Crystal Palace, Crow, Montcontour, Orange Bay and Yelpana. On the final turn, Alleged accelerated clear of the field and opened up a lead of four lengths. Although several horses made progress in the closing stages, Alleged was never seriously challenged and won by one and a half lengths from Balmerino, with Crystal Palace taking third, just ahead of Dunfermline and Crow. The winning time was 2:30.6.

== Race details ==
- Sponsor: none
- Purse:
- Going: Good to Firm
- Distance: 2,400 metres
- Number of runners: 26
- Winner's time: 2:30.6

== Full result ==
Pos.	Marg.	Horse	Age	Jockey	Trainer (Country)
1		Alleged	3	Lester Piggott	Vincent O'Brien (IRE)
2	1½	Balmerino	5	Ron Hutchinson	John Dunlop (GB)
3	2	Crystal Palace	3	Alain Badel	François Mathet (FR)
4	snk	Dunfermline	3	Willie Carson	Dick Hern (GB)
5	nk	Crow	4	Yves Saint-Martin	Angel Penna Sr. (FR)
6	1½	Monseigneur	3	Tony Murray	François Boutin (FR)
7	½	Infra Green	5	Georges Doleuze	Edouard Bartholomew (FR)
8	nk	Malacate	4	Philippe Paquet	François Boutin (FR)
9	shd	Yelpana	3	Greville Starkey	A Bates (FR)
10	shd	Guadanini	3	Bill Pyers	Robert Carver (FR)
11		Dom Alaric	3	Élie Lellouche	Olivier Douieb (FR)
12		On My Way	7	Alfred Gibert	N Pelat (FR)
13		Carwhite	3	Freddy Head	Alec Head (FR)
14		Vivi	5	S. Leonardos	Oskar Langner (GER)
15		Shafaraz	4	J Taillard	Patrick Biancone (FR)
16		Iron Duke	4	Henri Samani	Freddie Palmer (FR)
17		Orange Bay	5	Pat Eddery	Peter Walwyn (GB)
18		Amyntor	3	G Rivases	R Mesme (FR)
19		Montcontour	3	Gerard Dubroeucq	Maurice Zilber (FR)
20		Kamicia	3	Alain Lequeux	Jean Laumain (FR)
21		Fabuleux Jane	3	R Jallu	John Cunnington (FR)
22		Panamint	3	Wally Swinburn	Dermot Weld (IRE)
23		Cunning Trick	4	Jean Cruguet	John W. Russell (USA)
24		Mia	3	C Peszoa	(ARG)
25		Arctic Tern	4	Maurice Philipperon	John Fellows (FR)
26		Sarah Siddons	4	Joe Mercer	Paddy Prendergast (IRE)

* Abbreviations: ns = nose; shd = short-head; hd = head; snk = short neck; nk = neck

== Winner's details ==
Further details of the winner, Alleged.

- Sex: Colt
- Foaled: 4 May 1974
- Country: United States
- Sire: Hoist The Flag; Dam: Princess Pout (Prince John)
- Owner: Robert Sangster
- Breeder: June McKnight
