= Manado (horse) =

Irish-bred Thoroughbred racehorse

- Sire: Captain's Gig
- Grandsire: Turn-To
- Dam: Slipstream
- Damsire: Sing Sing
- Sex: Stallion
- Foaled: 26 February 1973
- Country: Ireland
- Colour: Bay
- Breeder: J Coggan
- Owner: Souren Vanian
- Trainer: François Boutin
- Record: 12:3-1-3

Major wins
- Prix Yacowlef (1975); Prix de la Salamandre (1975); Grand Critérium (1975)

Awards
- Timeform rating 130 (1975), 123 (1976); Timeform best two-year-old (1976); Top-rated French two-year-old (1976)

Manado (26 February 1973–18 March 1988) was an Irish-bred, French-trained Thoroughbred racehorse and sire. In a racing career which lasted from August 1975 until October 1976 he won three of his twelve races. He was rated the best horse of his generation in Europe in 1975 when he won the Prix Yacowlef by eight lengths before defeating strong opposition in both the Prix de la Salamandre and Grand Critérium. In 1976 he failed to win in eight starts but ran well in several major races. He was retired at the end of the season and stood as a breeding stallion in Ireland and Japan, but made little impact as a sire of winners.

== Background ==
Manado was a bay horse with no white markings bred in Ireland by J Coggan. He was probably the best horse sired by Captain's Gig, an American stallion who won the 1967 Belmont Futurity Stakes. Manado's dam, Slipstream, was a moderate racehorse, with her only success in ten start coming in a minor race at Wolverhampton. She did, however, come from a good family, being a descendant of the broodmare Millstream and therefore closely related to the Goodwood Cup winner Medway and the Nassau Stakes winner Reel In.

As a yearling Manado was offered for sale and bought for 4,200 guineas by the Newmarket Bloodstock Agency, acting on behalf of Souren Vanian. He was sent into training with Fracois Boutin, and was ridden in most of his races by Boutin's stable jockey Philippe Paquet.

== Racing career ==
=== 1975: two-year-old season ===
Manado his made his racecourse debut in early August when he contested the Prix Yacowlef, a race for previously unraced juveniles over 1000 metres at Deauville Racecourse. He won impressively by eight lengths and was then moved up in class for the Group One Prix Morny over 1200 metres at the same course two weeks later. Ridden by Paquet, he started the 7/2 second favourite behind Vitiges, the winner of the Prix Robert Papin. Manado and Vitiges disputed the lead until 400 metres from the finish, when Manado swerved abruptly to the left, colliding with the rail and losing any chance of winning. He failed to recover and finished eighth of the thirteen runners.

On 14 September, Manado faced Vitiges for the second time in the Prix de la Salamandre over 1400 metres at Longchamp Racecourse. The other runners included two challengers from Britain: the Richmond Stakes winner Stand To Reason and the Chesham Stakes winner Smuggler. Rather than challenging the leaders from the start as he had done in the Morny, Paquet restrained the colt before making a forward move in the straight. He accelerated to overtake Vitiges inside the last 200 metres and won by a length, with Comeram, ridden by Lester Piggott half a lengths away. in third. For his final appearance of the season, Manado started the 18/10 favourite for the Group One Grand Critérium over 1600 metres at Longchamp on 12 October. He was again opposed by Vitiges and Comeram, with the other runners including the Prix des Chênes winner French Swanee, and the future Epsom Derby winner Empery. Paquet settled the favourite just behind the leaders before producing a strong run along the inside rail in the straight. He took the lead 200 metres from the finish and won by one and a half lengths from Comeram with French Swanee in third ahead of Pier. Kano finished fifth ahead of Vitiges and Empery but was disqualified for causing interference. The form of the race was subsequently boosted when Kano won the Critérium de Saint-Cloud, whilst Comeram finished second under top weight in the Prix Thomas Bryon.

At the end of the year, a half-share in Manado was sold for a sum reported to be in excess of £250,000 to the Irish breeder Tim Rogers, and it was announced that his principal objective would be the following year's 2000 Guineas.

=== 1976: three-year-old season ===
Manado began his second season in the Prix Djebel at Maisons-Laffitte Racecourse on 9 April. He started the 5/10 favourite despite being less than fully fit, but was beaten a length by Vitiges. Manado was then sent to England for the 2000 Guineas over the Rowley Mile course at Newmarket and started the 4/1 second favourite behind Wollow. He traveled well in the early stages but then began to struggle on the firm ground and finished ninth of the seventeen runners. He returned two weeks later for the Prix Lupin over 2100 metres at Longchamp and finished seventh behind Youth: he tired badly in the closing stages and was never again raced at a distance of further than 1600 metres.

Manado returned to action in the Prix Maurice de Gheest over 1300 metres at Deauville in which he raced against specialist sprinters and finished fourth, beaten just over a length by the filly Girl Friend. A week later at the same course he contested the Group One Prix Jacques Le Marois over 1600 metres. In a blanket finish in which the first seven runners crossed the line together he finished fourth behind Gravelines, Radetzky and Vitiges. Boutin commented that the horse might have won if Paquet had delayed his challenge. Manado's last three races were at Longchamp in autumn. On 5 September, he started favourite for the Prix du Rond Point but in another bunched finish he took third behind the four-year-olds Monsanto and Nurabad, beaten half a length and a short head. He was equipped with blinkers in the Prix du Moulin three weeks later and finished third behind Gravelines and Dona Barod. He made his final appearance on 24 October when he was ridden by Lester Piggott and finished third behind the two-year-olds Pharly and Lady Mere in the Prix de la Forêt over 1400 metres, having been somewhat impeded by the runner-up in the straight.

== Assessment ==
There was no International Classification of European two-year-olds in 1975: the official handicappers of Britain, Ireland and France compiled separate rankings for horses which competed in those countries. In the French Free Handicap, Manado was rated the best two-year-old of the year, two pounds ahead of Vitiges. The independent Timeform organisation awarded him a rating of 130, making him their best two-year-old of the season ahead of Vitiges and the British colt Wollow. In their annual Racehorses of 1975 Timeform described him as having "the best form of any two-year-old colt who raced in England, France or Ireland in 1975". In 1976, the official handicappers of Britain and France again produced separate ratings. In the French handicap, Manado was rated the thirteenth best three-year-old colt, ten pounds behind Youth. Timeform rated him on 123, thirteen pounds behind Youth, their Horse of the Year.

== Stud career ==
At the end of his three-year-old season, Manado was retired from racing. In 1978 he began his career as a breeding stallion at the Simmonstown Stud in County Kildare at an initial fee of 1,750 guineas. He was not a success at stud but sired some good winners including Erin's Hope (Desmond Stakes), and Solva (Autumn Days Handicap). Manado was exported to Japan in 1982. His last reported foal were born in 1987. Manado died in Japan on 18 March 1988.

== Pedigree ==
Pedigree of Manado (IRE), bay stallion, 1973
Sire Captain's Gig (USA) 1965	Turn-To (USA); 1951	Royal Charger	Nearco
Sire Captain's Gig (USA) 1965	Turn-To (USA); 1951	Royal Charger	Sun Princess
Sire Captain's Gig (USA) 1965	Turn-To (USA); 1951	Source Sucree	Admiral Drake
Sire Captain's Gig (USA) 1965	Turn-To (USA); 1951	Source Sucree	Lavendula
Sire Captain's Gig (USA) 1965	Make Sail (USA); 1957	Ambiorix	Tourbillon
Sire Captain's Gig (USA) 1965	Make Sail (USA); 1957	Ambiorix	Lavendula
Sire Captain's Gig (USA) 1965	Make Sail (USA); 1957	Anchors Aweigh	Devil Diver
Sire Captain's Gig (USA) 1965	Make Sail (USA); 1957	Anchors Aweigh	True Bearing
Dam Slipstream (ITY) 1967	Sing Sing (GB); 1957	Tudor Minstrel	Owen Tudor
Dam Slipstream (ITY) 1967	Sing Sing (GB); 1957	Tudor Minstrel	Sansonnet
Dam Slipstream (ITY) 1967	Sing Sing (GB); 1957	Agin the Law	Portlaw
Dam Slipstream (ITY) 1967	Sing Sing (GB); 1957	Agin the Law	Revolte
Dam Slipstream (ITY) 1967	Palestream (GB); 1959	Palestine	Fair Trial
Dam Slipstream (ITY) 1967	Palestream (GB); 1959	Palestine	Una
Dam Slipstream (ITY) 1967	Palestream (GB); 1959	Millstream	Mieuxce
Dam Slipstream (ITY) 1967	Palestream (GB); 1959	Millstream	Millrock (Family 3-h)

- as a son of Captain's Gig, Manado was inbred 4 x 4 to Lavendula, meaning that this broodmare appears twice in the fourth generation of his pedigree.
