= Dan and Ada Rice =

American businesspeople, racehorse owners, and philanthropists

Daniel F. Rice (1896–1975) and his wife Ada L. Rice (1898–1977) were American business people, thoroughbred racehorse owners and breeders, and philanthropists. Dan Rice was educated in the public school system of Chicago, Illinois and spent two years at Depaul University and the University of Notre Dame. In 1919, he founded his own commodity brokerage, Daniel F. Rice and Company. His company became successful over the 35 years that he ran it. The company merged with Hayden, Stone & Co. in 1959. Rice later ran Rice Grain Corporation.

Dan Rice and his wife, Ada, contributed to many charities and organizations and created the Rice Foundation which is still running today. The Rice Foundation gives contributions to places that the Rices believed in such as programs to prevent child abuse and for many research areas such as plant development and preservation, medical advancement and animal conservation. Additionally, the Foundation supports the arts such as the Chicago History Museum, the Art Institute of Chicago, the Lyric Opera of Chicago and other museums.

Because the Rices were widely respected for their extensive philanthropies in the Chicago area, a number of places are named in their honor in the region. The combination of their first names formed Danada and appears in many places in Wheaton, Illinois.

== Thoroughbred racing ==
In 1929 the Rices bought a 152-acre (0.62 km^{2}) farm located south of Wheaton which became named Danada Farm. Their house was located across from the farm and later was named Danada House which now is a museum and a place for social functions. It can house about 150 people for a party. Mrs. Rice was known to throw lavish parties at the house. Danada House is a 19-room estate that contains gardens, a greenhouse, a swimming pool, porch and atrium. Danada Farms had corn, wheat, sheep, hogs, cattle, chickens, turkeys and an apple orchard. Over the years the farm grew to over 1,350 acres (5.5 km^{2}). The couple loved Thoroughbred horse racing and built a Kentucky-style stable that could hold 26 horses. A half-mile training track, which included a 4-position electronic starting gate, was built across the street from the stables. Later, a tunnel was built under Naperville Road for the horses to safely get to the stables. The track, starting gate, and tunnel still exist today.

In 1946, they acquired a part of the Idle Hour Stock Farm near Lexington, Kentucky that was also given the Danada name. Mr. and Mrs. Rice bred horses on the farm, and raced them exclusively under her name. In 1965, one of their colts, Lucky Debonair, won the Kentucky Derby with Willie Shoemaker as jockey. Heavily involved in the sport of thoroughbred horse racing, Dan Rice was a member of the board of directors of Arlington Park Racetrack.

In addition to the sport of horse racing, in the latter part of the 1940s Dan Rice was a shareholder in the Los Angeles Dons of the newly formed All-America Football Conference.

== Philanthropy ==
In 1947, Dan Rice set up the Daniel F. and Ada L. Rice Foundation. In the next forty years, the foundation made $12.4 million in donations through 1,257 grants. As of 1988, the Rice Foundation had accumulated over $60 million. This money was donated to worthy causes such as endangered species, programs for abused children and medical research to support further advancement in areas such as rare illnesses and diseases. Dan and Ada Rice donated $10 million to the Art Institute of Chicago, $3 million to the Shedd Aquarium, $2 million to the Chicago History Museum (formerly known as the Chicago Historical Society), and $100,000 to the Boy Scouts of America for a camping facility for handicapped Scouts. Additionally, the Rice Foundation contributed to the Morton Arboretum to support the growth and research of elm trees and as a result a hybrid of an elm tree is named for them, the Danada Charm. Not only did the Rices donate money but they also donated land. They gave about 19 acres (77,000 m^{2}) for the Illinois Institute of Technology campus and 13 acres (53,000 m^{2}) to the Wheaton Park District for a water park and community center.

=== Rice Foundation beneficiaries ===
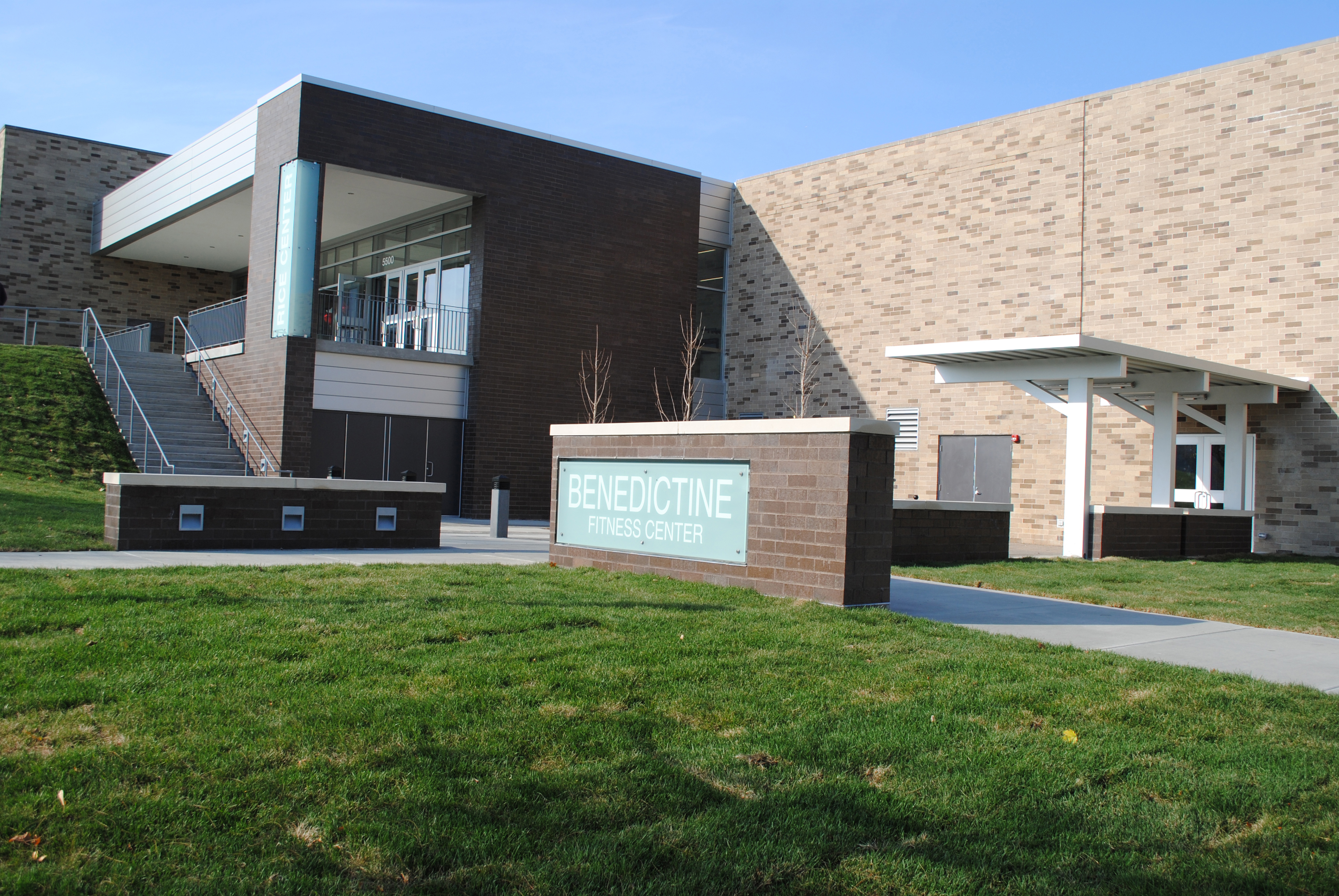
The Dan and Ada Rice Athletic Center at Benedictine University

The following places in the Chicago metropolitan area have benefited from the Daniel F. and Ada L. Rice Foundation:

- The Chicago Botanic Gardens houses the Daniel F. and Ada L. Rice Plant Conservation Science Center.
- The Chicago History Museum exterior facade on Clark Street honors the Daniel F. and Ada L. Rice Pavilion.
- The Daniel F. and Ada L. Rice Building is part of the Art Institute of Chicago.
- The Daniel F. and Ada L. Rice Child and Family Center in Evanston is part of the Children's Home and Aid Society of Illinois.
- The Brookfield Zoo houses the Daniel F. and Ada L Rice Conservation and Biology Research Center, which contains a molecular genetics laboratory that conducts tests to analyze species and subspecies.
- The Field Museum has the Dan F. and Ada L. Rice Gallery which houses changing themed exhibits.
- The Rehabilitation Institute of Chicago contains the Daniel F. and Ada L. Rice Patient Treatment Center.
- The Shedd Aquarium has the Daniel F. and Ada L. Rice Pool, Amphitheater and Underwater Viewing Gallery.
- The Adler Planetarium had the Daniel F. and Ada L. Rice Solarium and cafeteria.
- The Village of Skokie, Illinois partnered with the Rice Foundation to build the North Shore Center for the Performing Arts in 1996
- In 1994, the foyer of the Lyric Opera of Chicago containing Austrian crystal chandeliers and elaborate stenciled ceilings was named the Daniel F. and Ada L. Rice Grand foyer.
- Benedictine University has the Dan and Ada Rice Center used for all indoor athletic events. The Center contains a multi-purpose floor for basketball and volleyball, swimming pool, weight training equipment, racquetball courts, and the Trophy Room. The Trophy Room contains the honors and awards of Dan and Ada Rice including the victory racing plates worn by Lucky Debonair, winner of the 1965 Kentucky Derby.
