= Wollow =

Irish-bred Thoroughbred racehorse (1973–after 1997)

- Sire: Wolver Hollow
- Grandsire: Sovereign Path
- Dam: Wichuraiana
- Damsire: Worden
- Sex: Stallion
- Foaled: 1973
- Country: Ireland
- Colour: Bay
- Breeder: Tally-Ho Stud
- Owner: Carlo d'Alessio
- Trainer: Henry Cecil
- Record: 11:9-0-0
- Earnings: £202,806

Major wins
- Champagne Stakes (1975); Dewhurst Stakes (1975); Greenham Stakes (1976); 2000 Guineas (1976); Eclipse Stakes (1976); Sussex Stakes (1976); Benson & Hedges Gold Cup (1976)

Awards
- Highest Rated British Two-year-old (1975); Timeform rating: 132
- Last updated on 19 February 2025

Wollow (1973 – after 1997) was an Irish-bred, British-trained Thoroughbred racehorse and sire. In a career that lasted from summer 1975 to October 1976 he ran eleven times and won nine races. In 1975 he was rated the best two-year-old in Britain by a margin of five pounds and the following spring he won the Classic 2000 Guineas. He was undefeated in six races when starting favourite for the 1976 Epsom Derby but finished unplaced. Wollow won three more important races before his retirement later that year. He made little impact at stud and was exported to Japan in 1981.

== Background ==
Wollow was a lightly built bay horse bred at Mullingar, County Westmeath, Ireland, by the Tally-Ho Stud. He was the most successful horse got by his sire Wolver Hollow, the winner of the 1969 Eclipse Stakes. His dam, Wichuraiana, showed little racing ability, but was well-bred, being a half-sister of the Goodwood Cup winner Exar, and, as a descendant of the influential broodmare Black Ray, was a member of the same Thoroughbred family as Mill Reef and Blushing Groom. As a yearling, Wollow was bought for the modest price of 7,000 guineas by the Newmarket Bloodstock Agency, acting on behalf of the Italian lawyer Carlo d'Alessio, who sent the colt to be trained at Newmarket by Henry Cecil.

== Racing career ==
=== 1975: two-year-old season ===
Wollow was unbeaten as a two-year-old in 1976. He began his career by winning a maiden race over six furlongs at his home course at Newmarket and was then moved up in distance to win the seven furlong Fitzroy House Stakes. In September he was promoted in class and won the Group Two Champagne Stakes at Doncaster's St Leger meeting. On his final start of the season he returned to Newmarket for Britain's most prestigious two-year-old race, the seven-furlong Dewhurst Stakes. He won the Group One race impressively from a field which included the Middle Park Stakes winner Hittite Glory and the leading Irish colt Malinowski. In the Free Handicap, a rating of the season's best two-year-olds, Wollow was given an official rating of 133, making him the best horse of his generation by a margin of five pounds.

=== 1976: three-year-old season ===
Wollow began his three-year-old season at Newbury Racecourse in April with a run in the Greenham Stakes, a recognised trial for the 2000 Guineas. He won the race comfortably from the July Stakes winner Super Cavalier with Gentilhombre in third. Two weeks later he started the even money (1/1) favourite for the 2000 Guineas against sixteen opponents. Ridden by the Italian jockey Gianfranco Dettori he took the lead a quarter of a mile from the finish and ran on strongly in the closing stages to win by one and a half lengths from Vitiges. His winning time of 1:38.09 was the fastest for the race since Palestine won in 1950. Following the success of Bolkonski in 1975, Wollow's win made d'Alessio the first owner since 1834 to win consecutive runnings of the 2000 Guineas.

Wollow was then unbeaten in six races and at Epsom in June he started 11/10 favourite for the Derby, despite running over a distance half a mile further than any of his previous races. He met with some interference at Tattenham Corner but appeared to have no obvious excuses as he finished fifth behind the French-trained Empery. His defeat reportedly cost British punters £7 million. In July, Wollow was brought back in distance for the ten-furlong Eclipse Stakes at Sandown. He finished second to the French colt Trepan but was awarded the race when the winner tested positive for theobromine, a banned substance. At the end of the month he added another Group One success when he took the Sussex Stakes over one mile at Goodwood. At York in August, Wollow ran in the fifth edition of the Benson & Hedges Gold Cup, the race now known as the International Stakes. He produced one of his best performances to win from a field which included the leading French horses Crow and Trepan.

On his final start, Wollow failed to reproduce his best form as he finished unplaced behind Vitiges in the Champion Stakes at Newmarket in October. He was then syndicated to stand at stud with a valuation of £1.2 million.

== Assessment ==
Wollow was given a best annual Timeform rating of 132: a rating of 130 is considered to indicate an "above average" Group One winner.

In their book, A Century of Champions, based on the Timeform rating system, John Randall and Tony Morris rated Wollow an "average" winner of the 2000 Guineas.

== Stud career ==
Wollow was retired to the Banstead Manor Stud. He was exported to Japan in 1981. He made very little impact in either location and was retired from stud duties on 24 April 1997.

== Pedigree ==
Pedigree of Wollow (IRE), bay stallion, 1973
Sire Wolver Hollow (GB) 1964	Sovereign Path; 1956	Grey Sovereign	Nasrullah
Sire Wolver Hollow (GB) 1964	Sovereign Path; 1956	Grey Sovereign	Kong
Sire Wolver Hollow (GB) 1964	Sovereign Path; 1956	Mountain Path	Bobsleigh
Sire Wolver Hollow (GB) 1964	Sovereign Path; 1956	Mountain Path	Path of Peace
Sire Wolver Hollow (GB) 1964	Cygnet; 1950	Caracalla	Tourbillon
Sire Wolver Hollow (GB) 1964	Cygnet; 1950	Caracalla	Astronomie
Sire Wolver Hollow (GB) 1964	Cygnet; 1950	Mrs Swan Song	Sir Walter Raleigh
Sire Wolver Hollow (GB) 1964	Cygnet; 1950	Mrs Swan Song	Donati's Comet
Dam Wichuraiana (GB) 1963	Worden; 1949	Wild Risk	Rialto
Dam Wichuraiana (GB) 1963	Worden; 1949	Wild Risk	Wild Violet
Dam Wichuraiana (GB) 1963	Worden; 1949	Sans Tares	Sind
Dam Wichuraiana (GB) 1963	Worden; 1949	Sans Tares	Tara
Dam Wichuraiana (GB) 1963	Excelsa; 1949	Owen Tudor	Hyperion
Dam Wichuraiana (GB) 1963	Excelsa; 1949	Owen Tudor	Mary Tudor
Dam Wichuraiana (GB) 1963	Excelsa; 1949	Infra Red	Ethnarch
Dam Wichuraiana (GB) 1963	Excelsa; 1949	Infra Red	Black Ray (Family:22-d)
