= Grand Prix de Chantilly =

Flat horse race in France

- Class: Group 2
- Location: Chantilly Racecourse; Chantilly, France
- Race type: Flat / Thoroughbred
- Website: france-galop.com

Race information
- Distance: 2,400 metres (1½ miles)
- Surface: Turf
- Track: Right-handed
- Qualification: Four-years-old and up
- Weight: 56 kg Allowances; 1½ kg for fillies and mares Penalties; 3 kg for Group 1 winners * 2 kg for Group 2 winners * 1 kg if two Group 3 wins * * since July 1 last year
- Purse: €130,000 (2022); 1st: €74,100

Grand Prix de Chantilly
2025
Arrow Eagle	Sibayan	Junko

Previous years
2024
Junko	Marquisat	Dubai Honour
2023
Simca Mille	Kertez	Lastotchka
2022
Mare Australis	Bubble Gift	Glycon
2021
In Swoop	Sublimis	Vaucelles

2020-2011
2020
Way To Paris	French King	Royal Julius
2019
Aspetar	Ziyad	Silverwave
2018
Waldgeist	Dschingis Secret	Way To Paris
2017
Silverwave	Talismanic	Apilobar
2016
One Foot In Heaven	Garlingari	Harlem
2015
Manatee	Prince Gibraltar	Agent Murphy
2014
Spiritjim	Now We Can	Norse King
2013
Now We Can	Haya Landa	Remus De La Tour
2012
Aiken	Maxios	Dunaden
2011
Silver Pond	Behkabad	Allied Powers

2010–2001
2010
Allied Powers	Timos	Pouvoir Absolu
2009
Scintillo	Chinchon	Magadan
2008
Doctor Dino	Zambezi Sun	Not Just Swing
2007
Saddex	Vison Celebre	Mountain High
2006
Policy Maker	Salutino	Bellamy Cay
2005
Geordieland	Fracassant	Short Pause
2004
Policy Maker	Fair Mix	Short Pause
2003
Ange Gabriel	Martaline	Balakheri
2002
Anabaa Blue	Ange Gabriel	St Expedit
2001
Egyptband	St Expedit	Mont Rocher

2000–1995
2000
Daring Miss	First Magnitude	Ben Ewar
1999
Capri	Epistolaire	Sestino
1998
Fragrant Mix	Sibling Rival	Oa Baldixe
1997
Steward	Surgeon	Darazari
1996
Poliglote	Luna Mareza	Danseur Landais
1995
Tot Ou Tard	Solid Illusion	Suave Tern

The Grand Prix de Chantilly is a Group 2 flat horse race in France open to thoroughbreds aged four years or older. It is run at Chantilly over a distance of 2,400 metres (about 1½ miles), and it is scheduled to take place each year in late May or early June.

The event replaced the Grand Prix d'Évry, a race established when Évry Racecourse opened in 1973. It was run each year until the venue closed in 1996, and the present version was introduced at Chantilly in 1997.

The leading horses from the Grand Prix de Chantilly often go on to compete in the Grand Prix de Saint-Cloud. The last to win both in the same year was Waldgeist in 2018.

The Grand Prix de Chantilly is now staged on the same day as the Prix du Jockey Club.

== Records ==
Most successful horse (2 wins):

- Policy Maker – 2004, 2006

Leading jockey (5 wins):

- Olivier Peslier – Fragrant Mix (1998), Doctor Dino (2008), Silver Pond (2011), In Swoop (2021), Mare Australis (2022)

Leading trainer (9 wins):

- André Fabre – Magwal (1984), Galla Placidia (1986), Star Lift (1989), Wajd (1991), Serrant (1993), Bright Moon (1994), Fragrant Mix (1998), Daring Miss (2000), Manatee (2015)

Leading owner (5 wins):

- Daniel Wildenstein – Star Lift (1989), Ode (1990), Pistolet Bleu (1992), Serrant (1993), Bright Moon (1994)

== Winners since 1979 ==
Year	Winner	Age	Jockey	Trainer	Owner	Time
1979	Noir et Or	4	Maurice Philipperon	John Cunnington Jr.	Paul de Moussac	2:32.10
1980	Scorpio	4	Philippe Paquet	François Boutin	Gerry Oldham	2:37.00
1981	Lancastrian	4	Alain Lequeux	David Smaga	Sir Michael Sobell	2:42.70
1982	Hard to Sing	6	Gérard Dubroeucq	Charlie Milbank	N. Lathom-Sharp	2:37.00
1983	Diamond Shoal	4	Cash Asmussen	Ian Balding	Paul Mellon	2:42.50
1984	Magwal	5	Alfred Gibert	André Fabre	Mahmoud Fustok	2:36.80
1985	Long Mick	4	Cash Asmussen	François Boutin	Jean-Luc Lagardère	2:30.40
1986	Galla Placidia	4	Cash Asmussen	André Fabre	William Kazan	2:32.40
1987	Sharaniya	4	Alain Lequeux	Alain de Royer-Dupré	HH Aga Khan IV	2:37.10
1988	Something True	4	Tony Cruz	Georges Mikhalidès	Mahmoud Fustok	2:29.64
1989	Star Lift	5	Cash Asmussen	André Fabre	Daniel Wildenstein	2:34.45
1990	Ode	4	Dominique Boeuf	Élie Lellouche	Daniel Wildenstein	2:33.33
1991	Wajd	4	Walter Swinburn	André Fabre	Sheikh Mohammed	2:35.59
1992	Pistolet Bleu	4	Dominique Boeuf	Élie Lellouche	Daniel Wildenstein	2:29.81
1993	Serrant	5	Thierry Jarnet	André Fabre	Daniel Wildenstein	2:37.63
1994	Bright Moon	4	Thierry Jarnet	André Fabre	Daniel Wildenstein	2:30.66
1995	Tot ou Tard	5	Eric Saint-Martin	Stéphane Wattel	Ecurie Kura	2:37.83
1996	Poliglote	4	Freddy Head	Criquette Head	Wertheimer et Frère	2:36.30
1997	Steward	4	Sylvain Guillot	Dominique Sépulchre	Georges Coude	2:30.50
1998	Fragrant Mix	4	Olivier Peslier	André Fabre	Jean-Luc Lagardère	2:35.40
1999	Capri	4	Kieren Fallon	Henry Cecil	Prince Fahd bin Salman	2:33.70
2000	Daring Miss	4	Christophe Soumillon	André Fabre	Khalid Abdullah	2:34.80
2001	Egyptband	4	Olivier Doleuze	Criquette Head-Maarek	Wertheimer et Frère	2:26.60
2002	Anabaa Blue	4	Christophe Soumillon	Carlos Lerner	Charles Mimouni	2:28.10
2003	Ange Gabriel	5	Thierry Jarnet	Eric Libaud	Antonia Devin	2:27.40
2004	Policy Maker	4	Kieren Fallon	Élie Lellouche	Ecurie Wildenstein	2:34.90
2005	Geordieland	4	Thierry Thulliez	Jean-Marie Béguigné	Raynald Elbaz	2:27.50
2006	Policy Maker	6	Stéphane Pasquier	Élie Lellouche	Ecurie Wildenstein	2:24.80
2007	Saddex	4	Torsten Mundry	Peter Rau	Stall Avena	2:28.70
2008	Doctor Dino	6	Olivier Peslier	Richard Gibson	Javier Martinez Salmean	2:35.40
2009	Scintillo	4	Richard Hughes	Richard Hannon Sr.	White Beech Farm	2:34.60
2010	Allied Powers	5	Ioritz Mendizabal	Michael Bell	Fish / Ware	2:33.90
2011	Silver Pond	4	Olivier Peslier	Carlos Laffon-Parias	Haras du Quesnay	2:29.60
2012	Aiken	4	William Buick	John Gosden	George Strawbridge	2:35.8
2013	Now We Can	4	Thierry Thulliez	Nicolas Clement	Winfried Engelbrecht-Bresges	2:33.16
2014	Spiritjim	4	Christophe Soumillon	Pascal Bary	Hspirit	2:29.32
2015	Manatee	4	Mickael Barzalona	André Fabre	Godolphin	2:29.64
2016	One Foot In Heaven	4	Christophe Soumillon	Alain de Royer-Dupré	Fair Salinia Ltd	2:35.53
2017	Silverwave	5	Pierre-Charles Boudot	Pascal Bary	Hspirit	2:29.45
2018	Waldgeist	4	Pierre-Charles Boudot	André Fabre	Gestut Ammerland & Newsells Park	2:29.49
2019	Aspetar	4	James Doyle	Roger Charlton	Mohammed bin Khalifa Al Thani	2:24.60
2020	Way To Paris (Note: The 2020 running took place at Deauville due to the COVID-19 pandemic)	7	Pierre-Charles Boudot	Andrea Marcialis	Paolo Ferrario	2:38.02
2021	In Swoop	4	Olivier Peslier	Francis-Henri Graffard	Gestut Schlenderhan	2:45.37
2022	Mare Australis	4	Olivier Peslier	André Fabre	Gestut Schlenderhan	2:29.16
2023	Simca Mille	4	Alexis Pouchin	Stephane Wattel	Haras De La Perelle & Stephane Wattel	2:28.40
2024	Junko	5	Maxime Guyon	André Fabre	Wertheimer et Frère	2:32.94
2025	Arrow Eagle	4	Cristian Demuro	Jean-Claude Rouget	Mrs Waltraut Spanner	2:29.77
2026	Goliath	6	Christophe Soumillon	Francis-Henri Graffard	Resolute Bloodstock	2:26:75

== Earlier winners ==
- 1973: Karoon
- 1974: Admetus
- 1975: Un Kopeck
- 1976: Tip Moss
- 1977: Paint the Town
- 1978: Vagaries

== See also ==
- List of French flat horse races
