= Prix d'Hédouville =

Flat horse race in France

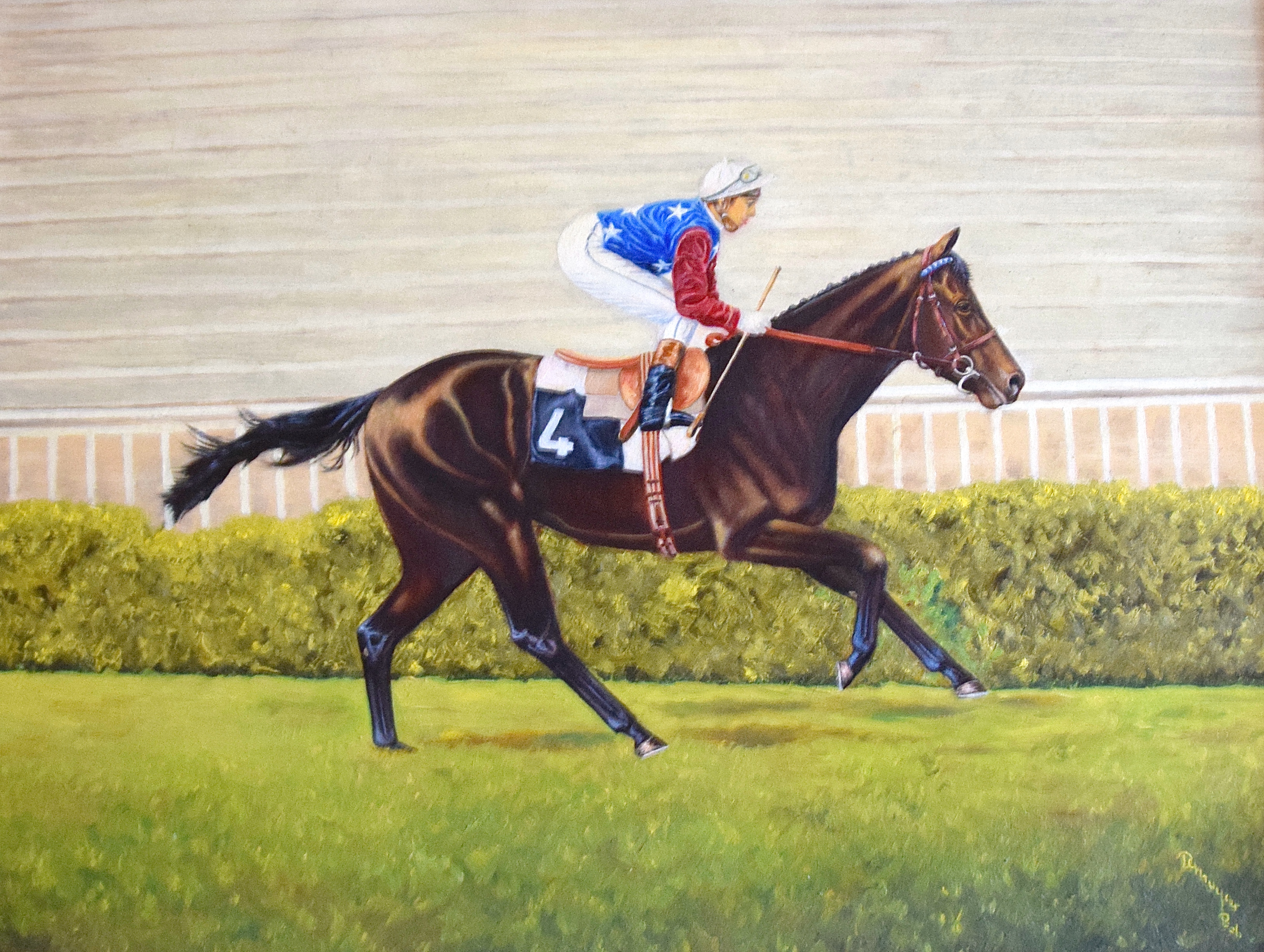
- Gap of Dunloe, painted by Bob Demuyser oil on canvas
- Class: Group 3
- Location: Longchamp Racecourse; Paris, France
- Inaugurated: 1890
- Race type: Flat / Thoroughbred
- Website: france-galop.com

Race information
- Distance: 2,400 metres (1½ miles)
- Surface: Turf
- Track: Right-handed
- Qualification: Four-years-old and up excluding Group 1 winners *
- Weight: 56 kg Allowances; 1½ kg for fillies and mares 1 kg if not Group placed * Penalties <3 kg for Group 1 winners * 2 kg for Group 2 winners * 1 kg for Group 3 winners * * since 1 July last year
- Purse: €80,000 (2022); 1st: €40,000

Prix d'Hédouville
2025
Arrow Eagle	Sibayan	Sevenna's Knight

Previous years
2024
Goliath	Galashiels	Shakti
2023
Haya Zark	Kertez	Know Thyself
2022
Mutabahi	Alter Adler	Mendocino
2021
In Swoop	The Good Man	Sublimis

2020-2011
2019
Petit Fils	Folamour	Nagano Gold
2018
Waldgeist	Way To Paris	Called To The Bar
2017
Tiberian	Talismanic	Way To Paris
2016
One Foot In Heaven	Harlem	Grey Lion
2015
Meleagros	Teletext	Cocktail Queen
2014
Spiritjim	Meleagros	Singing
2013
Pirika	Haya Landa	Remus De La Tour
2012
Allied Powers	Solemia	Molly Malone
2011
Ivory Land	Zack Hall	Watar

2010-2001
2010
Allied Powers	Mores Wells	Aizavoski
2009
Magadan	Coastal Path	Winkle
2008
Not Just Swing	Incanto Dream	Noble Prince
2007
Champs Elysees	Mister Conway	Group Captain
2006
Bellamy Cay	Salutino	Walk In The Park
2005
Fracassant	Geordieland	Alost
2004
Short Pause	Kindjhal	Maredsous
2003
Martaline	Loxias	Craig's Falcon
2002
Califet	Ange Gabriel	Sangreal
2001
Bonnet Rouge	Turbotiere	Valley Chapel

2000-1990
2000
First Magnitude	Crillon	Turbotiere
1999
Persian Ruler	Arnaqueur	Public Purse
1997
Steward	Prussian Blue	Si Seductor
1996
Percutant	Rainbow Dancer	Bobinski
1995
Tot Ou Tard	Grioun	L'Ile Tudy
1994
Petit Loup	Djais	Marchand De Sable
1993
Sharp Counsel	Dariyoun	Non Partisan
1992
Vert Amande	Northern Park	Flanaghan Cocktail
1991
Glorify	Luthier Enchanteur	Our Account
1990
Robore	Gasson	Robertet

The Prix d'Hédouville is a Group 3 flat horse race in France open to thoroughbreds aged four years or older. It is run over a distance of 2,400 metres (about 1½ miles) at Longchamp in May.

== History ==
The event is named in memory of Charles d'Hédouville (1809–1890), a long-serving member of the Société d'Encouragement. It was established in 1890, and was originally held at Chantilly. It was initially open to horses aged three or older and contested over 2,000 metres.

The race was abandoned throughout World War I, with no running from 1915 to 1918. It was staged at Longchamp in 1919 and 1920, and returned to Chantilly in 1921. It was cancelled in 1940, and took place at Le Tremblay in 1943 and 1944.

The event was extended to 2,400 metres in 1954, and cut to 1,800 metres the following year. Its original length was restored in 1957, and it reverted to 2,400 metres in 1962. It was discontinued in 1965.

The Prix d'Hédouville was relaunched as a three-year-olds' race in 1972. The first two editions were held at Longchamp, and the final running was at Chantilly in 1974.

The present format of the Prix d'Hédouville was introduced in 1978. From this point it was run at Longchamp, and restricted to horses aged four or older. It was given Group 3 status in 1985.

== Records ==
Most successful horse (2 wins):

- Callistrate – 1894, 1895
- Champaubert – 1897, 1898
- Caius – 1904, 1905
- Moulins la Marche – 1908, 1909
- Nino – 1927, 1928
- Djebel – 1941, 1942
- Violoncelle – 1950, 1951
- Robore – 1989, 1990
- Allied Powers – 2010, 2012

Leading jockey (6 wins):

- Christophe Soumillon – Martaline (2003), Fracassant (2005), Bellamy Cay (2006), Ivory Land (2011), Spiritjim (2014), One Foot In Heaven (2016)

Leading trainer (10 wins):

- André Fabre – Luth Dancer (1988), Glorify (1991), First Magnitude (2000), Martaline (2003), Short Pause (2004), Fracassant (2005), Bellamy Cay (2006), Champs Elysees (2007), Not Just Swing (2008), Pirika (2013)

Leading owner (12 wins):

- Marcel Boussac – Ramus (1922), Zariba (1923), Irismond (1925), Goyescas (1933), Corrida (1936), Cillas (1939), Djebel (1941, 1942), Hierocles (1943), Ardan (1945), Narses (1947), Djeddah (1949)

== Winners since 1979 ==
Year	Winner	Age	Jockey	Trainer	Owner	Time
1979	Noir et Or	4	Maurice Philipperon	John Cunnington Jr.	Paul de Moussac
1980	Scorpio	4	Philippe Paquet	François Boutin	Gerry Oldham
1981	Lancastrian	4	Alain Lequeux	David Smaga	Sir Michael Sobell
1982	Gap of Dunloe	4	Serge Gorli	Patrick Biancone	Bob Demuyser
1983	Marasali	5	Alain Badel	Olivier Douieb	Serge Fradkoff
1984	Balitou	5	Walter Swinburn	Patrick Biancone	Daniel Wildenstein
1985	Darly	6	Freddy Head	David Smaga	Georges Blizniansky
1986	Baby Turk	4	Yves Saint-Martin	Alain de Royer-Dupré	Anne-Marie d'Estainville
1987	Malakim	4	Yves Saint-Martin	Alain de Royer-Dupré	HH Aga Khan IV	2:33.40
1988	Luth Dancer	4	Cash Asmussen	André Fabre	Paul de Moussac	2:33.10
1989	Robore	4	Dominique Boeuf	Noël Pelat	Marquis de Geoffre	2:37.70
1990	Robore	5	Alfred Gibert	Noël Pelat	Marquis de Geoffre	2:42.40
1991	Glorify	4	Pat Eddery	André Fabre	Khalid Abdullah	2:38.90
1992	Vert Amande	4	Dominique Boeuf	Élie Lellouche	Enrique Sarasola	2:39.40
1993	Sharp Counsel	4	Dominique Boeuf	Élie Lellouche	Francisco Guidotti	2:41.60
1994	Petit Loup	5	Freddy Head	Criquette Head	Maktoum Al Maktoum	2:39.60
1995	Tot ou Tard	5	Eric Saint-Martin	Stéphane Wattel	Ecurie Kura	2:51.80
1996	Percutant	5	Cash Asmussen	David Smaga	Thierry van Zuylen	2:33.90
1997	Steward	4	Sylvain Guillot	Dominique Sépulchre	Georges Coude	2:40.40
1998	Oa Baldixe	4	Sylvain Guillot	Pascal Bary	Francis Prat	2:42.60
1999	Persian Ruler	4	Sylvain Guillot	Dominique Sépulchre	Enrique Sarasola	2:34.30
2000	First Magnitude	4	Olivier Peslier	André Fabre	Daniel Wildenstein	2:52.60
2001	Bonnet Rouge	4	Olivier Peslier	Élie Lellouche	Frédéric Bianco	2:47.60
2002	Califet	4	Davy Bonilla	Guy Chérel	Enriquita Garcia-Gonzalez	2:30.80
2003	Martaline	4	Christophe Soumillon	André Fabre	Khalid Abdullah	2:30.40
2004	Short Pause	5	Gary Stevens	André Fabre	Khalid Abdullah	2:39.10
2005	Fracassant	4	Christophe Soumillon	André Fabre	HH Aga Khan IV	2:30.70
2006	Bellamy Cay	4	Christophe Soumillon	André Fabre	Khalid Abdullah	2:39.10
2007	Champs Elysees	4	Stéphane Pasquier	André Fabre	Khalid Abdullah	2:30.80
2008	Not Just Swing	4	Johan Victoire	André Fabre	Thierry Storme	2:33.10
2009	Magadan	4	Anthony Crastus	Élie Lellouche	Ecurie Wildenstein	2:29.80
2010	Allied Powers	5	Ioritz Mendizabal	Michael Bell	Fish / Ware	2:28.30
2011	Ivory Land	4	Christophe Soumillon	Alain de Royer-Dupré	Eduardo Fierro	2:36.70
2012	Allied Powers	7	Ioritz Mendizabal	Michael Bell	Fish / Ware	2:45.10
2013	Pirika	5	Pierre-Charles Boudot	André Fabre	Teruya Yoshida	2:37.52
2014	Spiritjim	4	Christophe Soumillon	Pascal Bary	Hspirit	2:37.77
2015	Meleagros	6	Adrien Fouassier	Alain Couetil	Denis Gorse	2:41.77
2016	One Foot In Heaven (Note: The 2016 and 2017 races took place at Saint-Cloud while Longchamp was closed for redevelopment)	4	Christophe Soumillon	Alain de Royer-Dupré	Fair Salinia Ltd	2:34.16
2017	Tiberian	5	Olivier Peslier	Alain Couetil	Earl Haras du Logis	2:35.44
2018	Waldgeist	4	Pierre-Charles Boudot	André Fabre	Gestut Ammerland & Newsells Park	2:31.22
2019	Petit Fils	4	Theo Bachelot	Jean-Pierre Gauvin	Mathieu Offenstadt	2:38.41
	no race 2020 (Note: The 2020 running was cancelled because of the COVID-19 pandemic in France)
2021	In Swoop	4	Olivier Peslier	Francis-Henri Graffard	Gestut Schlenderhan	2:36.81
2022	Mutabahi	4	Olivier Peslier	Henri-Alex Pantall	Abdullah bin Khalifa Al Thani	2:36.78
2023	Haya Zark	4	Christophe Soumillon	Adrien Fouassier	Odette Fau	2:42.35
2024	Goliath	4	Maxime Guyon	Francis-Henri Graffard	Philip Baron von Ullmann	2:51.36
2025	Arrow Eagle	4	Cristian Demuro	Jean-Claude Rouget	Mrs Waltraut Spanner	2:34.97
2026	Best Secret	4	Christophe Soumillon	Stephane Wattel	Wathnan Racing	2:32.90

== Earlier winners ==
- 1890: Le Sancy
- 1891: Chalet
- 1892: Gouverneur
- 1893: Fra Angelico
- 1894: Callistrate
- 1895: Callistrate
- 1896: Le Justicier
- 1897: Champaubert
- 1898: Champaubert
- 1899: Gardefeu
- 1900: Multiplicateur
- 1901: Semendria
- 1902: Codoman
- 1903: La Camargo
- 1904: Caius
- 1905: Caius
- 1906: Prestige
- 1907: King James
- 1908: Moulins la Marche
- 1909: Moulins la Marche
- 1910: Radis Rose
- 1911: Italus
- 1912: Calvados III
- 1913: Wagram
- 1914: Sardanapale
- 1915–18: no race
- 1919: Mihran
- 1920: Caroly
- 1921: Viburnum
- 1922: Ramus
- 1923: Zariba
- 1924: Scaramouche
- 1925: Irismond
- 1926: Ptolemy
- 1927: Nino
- 1928: Nino
- 1929: Guy Fawkes
- 1930: Mysarch
- 1931: Roi de Trefle
- 1932: Macaroni
- 1933: Goyescas
- 1934: Rentenmark
- 1935: Rarity
- 1936: Corrida
- 1937: Sanguinetto
- 1938: Sylvanire
- 1939: Cillas
- 1940: no race
- 1941: Djebel
- 1942: Djebel
- 1943: Hierocles
- 1944: Un Gaillard
- 1945: Ardan
- 1946:
- 1947: Narses
- 1948: Tharsis
- 1949: Djeddah
- 1950: Violoncelle
- 1951: Violoncelle
- 1952: Gerocourt
- 1953: Cosmos / Skyrocket *
- 1954: Peppermint
- 1955: Marjolet
- 1956: Clairvoie
- 1957: Brisemaille
- 1958: Primesautier
- 1959: Super
- 1960: Elven
- 1961: Night and Day
- 1962: Sourire
- 1963: Rafai
- 1964: Le Vermontois
- 1965–71: no race
- 1972: Wanderer
- 1973: Kalpour
- 1974: Flushing
- 1975–77: no race
- 1978: Rex Magna **

* The 1953 race was a dead-heat and has joint winners.
** Crow finished first in 1978, but he was relegated to second place following a stewards' inquiry.

== See also ==
- List of French flat horse races
