= Prix Maurice de Nieuil =

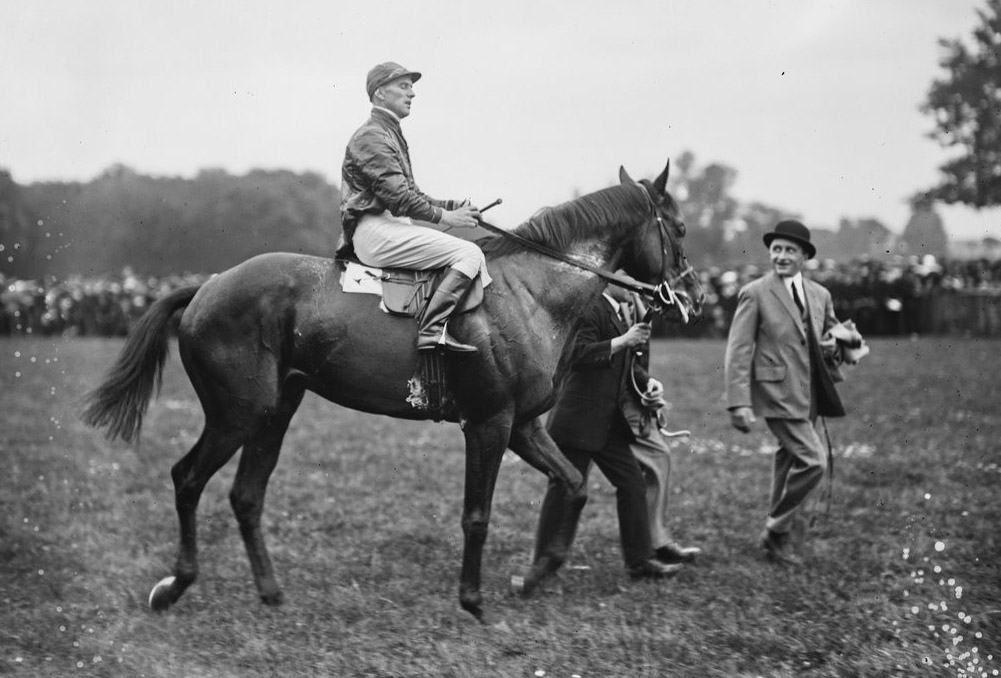
- Le Capucin winner in 1924
- Class: Group 2
- Location: Longchamp Racecourse; Paris, France
- Inaugurated: 1920
- Race type: Flat / Thoroughbred
- Website: france-galop.com

Race information
- Distance: 2,800 metres (1¾ miles)
- Surface: Turf
- Track: Right-handed
- Qualification: Four-years-old and up
- Weight: 57 kg Allowances; 1½ kg for fillies and mares Penalties; 2½ kg for Group 1 winners * 1½ kg for Group 2 winner * in current year
- Purse: €130,000 (2022); 1st: €74,100

Prix Maurice de Nieuil
2026
Sons And Lovers	Parachutiste	Double Major

Previous years
2025
Sibayan	Internaute	Double Major
2024
Double Major	Shembala	Ottery
2023
The Good Man	River Of Stars	Sober
2022
Quickthorn	Jannah Flower	The Good Man
2021
Valia	Skazino	Sublimis

2020-2011
2020
Red Verdon	Called To The Bar	San Huberto
2019
Way To Paris	Marmelo	Ligne D'Or
2018
Marmelo	Algometer	Palombe
2017
Talismanic	Marmelo	Sirius
2016
Candarliya	Launched	Now We Can
2015
Walzertakt	Bathyrhon	Glaring
2014
Terrubi	Brown Panther	Going Somewhere
2013
Verema	La Pomme D'Amour	Goldtara
2012
Tac De Boistron	Vadamar	Shahwardi
2011
Watar	Times Up	Shamanova

2010–2001
2010
Blek	Los Cristianos	Titurel
2009
Voila Ici	Winkle	Shemima
2008
Incanto Dream	Caudillo	Noble Prince
2007
Bussoni	Champs Elysees	Macleya
2006
Bellamy Cay	Montare	Ostankino
2005
Ostankino	Short Pause	Rhodesian Winner
2004
Forestier	Royal Fantasy	Clear Thinking
2003
Martaline	Westerner	Clety
2002
Pushkin	Polish Summer	Miraculous
2001
Generic	Romantic Affair	Courteous

2000–1995
2000
War Game	Herculano	Lucky Dream
1999
Lucky Dream	Palio Sky	Kashwan
1998
Public Purse	Limnos	Epistolaire
1997
Surgeon	Kutta	My Emma
1996
Darazari	Leeds	Astor Place
1995
Partipral	Tzar Rodney	Beauchamp Hero

The Prix Maurice de Nieuil is a Group 2 flat horse race in France open to thoroughbreds aged four years or older. It is run at Longchamp over a distance of 2,800 metres (about 1¾ miles), and it is scheduled to take place each year in July.

== History ==
The event was established in 1920, and it was initially called the Prix des Maréchaux. It was named in honour of the French and Allied marshals (maréchaux) who served in World War I. The race was originally staged at Saint-Cloud, and it was open to horses aged three or older. The early runnings were contested over 3,100 metres, and the distance was cut to 2,800 metres in 1928. It was shortened to 2,600 metres in 1936.

The Prix des Maréchaux was cancelled in 1940, and for a period thereafter it was held at Longchamp (1941 – 42, 1944 – 45), Le Tremblay (1943) and Maisons-Laffitte (1946). The Longchamp editions were run over 2,500 metres, and this became the regular distance when it returned to Saint-Cloud. It was known as the Prix de Strasbourg in 1947 and 1948.

The race was renamed the Prix Maurice de Nieuil in 1949. This was in memory of Maurice de Nieuil (1860 –1949), a former chairman of the Société Sportive d'Encouragement, one of the precursors of France Galop.

The Prix Maurice de Nieuil was transferred to Maisons-Laffitte in 1990. It was closed to three-year-olds and extended to 2,800 metres in 2001. It was run over 3,000 metres in 2004, but it reverted to 2,800 metres the following year.

The event moved to Longchamp in 2006, and it is now part of the Grand Prix de Paris meeting. It is currently held on the evening of July 14, the French national holiday of Bastille Day.

== Records ==
Most successful horse (2 wins):

- Or du Rhin – 1960, 1961

Leading jockey (7 wins):

- Christophe Soumillon – Martaline (2003), Bussoni (2007), Tac de Boistron (2013), Terrubi (2014), Candarliya (2016), Marmelo (2018), Valia (2021)

Leading trainer (9 wins):

- André Fabre – Saint Estephe (1985), French Glory (1990), Toulon (1991), Serrant (1993), Public Purse (1998), War Game (2000), Martaline (2003), Bellamy Cay (2006), Talismanic (2017)

Leading owner (5 wins):

- Marcel Boussac – Denver (1934), Jock (1941), Macip (1955), Argal (1958), Emerald (1965)
- Khalid Abdullah – French Glory (1990), Toulon (1991), Public Purse (1998), Martaline (2003), Bellamy Cay (2006)

== Winners since 1980 ==
Year	Winner	Age	Jockey	Trainer	Owner	Time
1980	Buckpoint	4	Jean-Luc Kessas	Bernard Sécly	Mrs Jean-Pierre Binet
1981	Perrault	4	Yves Saint-Martin	Pierre Pelat	Baron Thierry van Zuylen	2:38.40
1982	All Along	3	Serge Gorli	Patrick Biancone	Daniel Wildenstein	2:46.60
1983	Load the Cannons	3	Alain Badel	Olivier Douieb	Bruce McNall	2:39.80
1984	Full of Stars	4	Cash Asmussen	François Boutin	Peter Goulandris	2:36.30
1985	Saint Estephe	3	Alfred Gibert	André Fabre	Yan Houyvet	2:38.20
1986	Altayan	3	Cash Asmussen	Alain de Royer-Dupré	Aga Khan IV	2:44.50
1987	River Memories	3	Alain Lequeux	Robert Collet	Alan Clore	2:36.10
1988	Merce Cunningham	4	Willie Carson	Dick Hern	Peter M. Brant	2:40.20
1989	Ibn Bey	5	Richard Quinn	Paul Cole	Prince Fahd bin Salman	2:39.60
1990	French Glory	4	Pat Eddery	André Fabre	Khalid Abdullah	2:35.30
1991	Toulon	3	Pat Eddery	André Fabre	Khalid Abdullah	2:30.60
1992	Vert Amande	4	Dominique Boeuf	Élie Lellouche	Enrique Sarasola	2:36.80
1993	Serrant	5	Thierry Jarnet	André Fabre	Daniel Wildenstein	2:41.00
1994	Aboline	3	Cash Asmussen	John Hammond	Mrs Bryan Lynam	2:39.40
1995	Partipral	6	Dominique Boeuf	Élie Lellouche	Enrique Sarasola	2:48.60
1996	Darazari	3	Gérald Mossé	Alain de Royer-Dupré	HH Aga Khan IV	2:42.80
1997	Surgeon	4	Cash Asmussen	Jean de Roualle	Knut Eng	2:38.60
1998	Public Purse	4	Olivier Peslier	André Fabre	Khalid Abdullah	2:39.30
1999	Lucky Dream	5	Thierry Thulliez	Henri-Alex Pantall	Christine Dutertre	2:37.40
2000	War Game	4	Olivier Peslier	André Fabre	Daniel Wildenstein	2:38.40
2001	Generic	6	Alain Junk	Jean-Paul Gallorini	Teodoro Biasioli	3:00.00
2002	Pushkin	4	Dominique Boeuf	Élie Lellouche	Ecurie Wildenstein	2:58.50
2003	Martaline	4	Christophe Soumillon	André Fabre	Khalid Abdullah	2:55.10
2004	Forestier	4	Christophe Lemaire	Eric Danel	Mrs René J. Wattinne	3:26.60
2005	Ostankino	4	Stéphane Pasquier	Élie Lellouche	Ecurie Wildenstein	2:57.40
2006	Bellamy Cay	4	Kieren Fallon	André Fabre	Khalid Abdullah	3:01.90
2007	Bussoni	6	Christophe Soumillon	Hans Blume	Stall Kaiserberg	2:58.10
2008	Incanto Dream	4	Yann Lerner	Carlos Lerner	Louise Calamari	2:57.10
2009	Voila Ici	4	Mirco Demuro	Vittorio Caruso	Scuderia Incolinx	2:59.00
2010	Blek	5	Yohann Bourgois	Élie Lellouche	Alain Maubert	3:03.20
2011	Watar	6	Davy Bonilla	Freddy Head	Hamdan Al Maktoum	3:06.04
2012	Tac de Boistron	5	Christophe Soumillon	Alain Lyon	Alain Lyon	3:04.85
2013	Verema	4	Christophe Lemaire	Alain de Royer-Dupré	Aga Khan IV	3:00.01
2014	Terrubi	4	Christophe Soumillon	Pascal Bary	Ecurie J-L Bouchard	3:08.82
2015	Walzertakt	6	Francisco Da Silva	Jean-Pierre Carvalho	Gestut Aesculap	3:05.94
2016	Candarliya^{[a]}	4	Christophe Soumillon	Alain de Royer-Dupré	HH Aga Khan IV	3:04.79
2017	Talismanic^{[a]}	4	Mickael Barzalona	André Fabre	Godolphin	2:58.40
2018	Marmelo	5	Christophe Soumillon	Hughie Morrison	Fairy Story Partnership & Aziz Kheir	3:05.59
2019	Way To Paris	6	Cristian Demuro	Andrea Marcialis	Paolo Ferrario	3:00.29
2020	Red Verdon	7	Frankie Dettori	Ed Dunlop	Ronald Arculli	3:09.05
2021	Valia	4	Christophe Soumillon	Alain de Royer-Dupré	HH Aga Khan IV	3:08.40
2022	Quickthorn	5	Tom Marquand	Hughie Morrison	Lady Blyth	2:54.83
2023	The Good Man	6	Alexis Pouchin	Stephane Wattel	Capt Adrian Pratt, S Wattel Et Al	2:56.45
2024	Double Major	4	Maxime Guyon	Christophe Ferland	Wertheimer et Frère	3:09.86
2025	Sibayan	4	Mickael Barzalona	Francis-Henri Graffard	Aga Khan Studs SCEA	2:55.01
2026	Sons And Lovers	5	Dylan Browne McMonagle	Joseph O'Brien	H O S Syndicate	3:02.81

^{a} The 2016 and 2017 races took place at Saint-Cloud while Longchamp was closed for redevelopment.

== Earlier winners ==
- 1920: Dolphin
- 1921: Nouvel An
- 1922: Happy Go Lucky
- 1923: Bou Jeloud
- 1924: Le Capucin
- 1925: Transvaal
- 1926: Warminster
- 1927: Cerulea
- 1928: Bois Josselyn
- 1929: Pinceau
- 1930: Beldurhissa
- 1931: Kill Lady
- 1932: Filarete
- 1933: Casterari
- 1934: Denver
- 1935: Chaudiere
- 1936: Cap Nord
- 1937: Mont a la Quesne
- 1938: Nica
- 1939: Premier Baiser
- 1940: no race
- 1941: Jock
- 1942: Porphyros
- 1943:
- 1944: Brazza
- 1945: Samaritain
- 1946:
- 1947: Cappielluca
- 1948: Sunny Boy
- 1949:
- 1950: Templier
- 1951: Oghio
- 1952: Magnific
- 1953: Coquelin
- 1954: Soleil Levant
- 1955: Macip
- 1956: Master Boing
- 1957: Romantisme
- 1958: Argal
- 1959: Wildfire
- 1960: Or du Rhin
- 1961: Or du Rhin
- 1962: Esquimau
- 1963: Tournevent
- 1964: Firstborn
- 1965: Emerald
- 1966: Kimberley
- 1967: Sailor
- 1968: Beau Paon
- 1969: Copsale
- 1970: Ramsin
- 1971: Crucible
- 1972: Homeric
- 1973: Valuta
- 1974: Admetus
- 1975: Battle Song
- 1976: Condorcet
- 1977: Riboboy
- 1978: Midshipman
- 1979: Singapore Girl

== See also ==
- List of French flat horse races
- Recurring sporting events established in 1920 – this race is included under its original title, Prix des Maréchaux.

== Bibliography ==
- France Galop / Racing Post:
  - 1979, 1980, 1981, 1982, 1983, 1984, 1985, 1986, 1987, 1988
  - 1989, 1990, 1991, 1992, 1993, 1994, 1995, 1996, 1997, 1998
  - 1999, 2000, 2001, 2002, 2003, 2004, 2005, 2006, 2007, 2008
  - 2009, 2010, 2011, 2012, 2013, 2014, 2015, 2016, 2017, 2018
  - 2019, 2020, 2021, 2022, 2023, 2024, 2025, 2026
- galop.courses-france.com:
  - 1920–1949, 1950–1979, 1980–present

- france-galop.com – A Brief History: Prix Maurice de Nieuil.
- galopp-sieger.de – Prix Maurice de Nieuil.
- horseracingintfed.com – International Federation of Horseracing Authorities – Prix Maurice de Nieuil (2017).
- pedigreequery.com – Prix Maurice de Nieuil.
