= Vert Amande =

French-bred Thoroughbred racehorse

Vert Amand
- Sire: Kenmare
- Grandsire: Kalamoun
- Dam: Lady Berry
- Damsire: Violon d'Ingres
- Sex: Stallion
- Foaled: 1988
- Country: France
- Colour: Bay
- Breeder: Baron Guy de Rothschild
- Owner: Enrique Sarasola
- Trainer: Élie Lellouche
- Record: 25: 4-3-5
- Earnings: US$977,635 (equivalent)

Major wins
- Prix d'Hédouville (1992); Prix Maurice de Nieuil (1992); Prix Ganay (1993); Gran Premio Memorial Duque de Toledo (1993)
- Last updated on 11 August 2007

Vert Amande (foaled 1988 in France) is a Thoroughbred racehorse. Bred by Baron Guy de Rothschild at his Haras de Meautry in Lower Normandy, he was purchased and raced by the prominent Spanish industrialist, Enrique Sarasola.

Vert Amande was a winner of the 1992 Prix d'Hédouville and the Prix Maurice de Nieuil. In 1993 he won France's Prix Ganay at the Longchamp Racecourse and Spain's Group 3 Gran Premio Memorial Duque de Toledo at the Hipódromo de la Zarzuela in Madrid. The following year, his best major race result was a second to Urban Sea in the Prix d'Harcourt.

Vert Amande was ridden by Dominique Boeuf and trained by Élie Lellouche. He competed three times in the Prix de l'Arc de Triomphe, France's most prestigious race. His best performance was a third-place finish in 1992.

Retired from racing, Vert Amande stands at stud in Brazil.
