= Prix Ganay =

Flat horse race in France

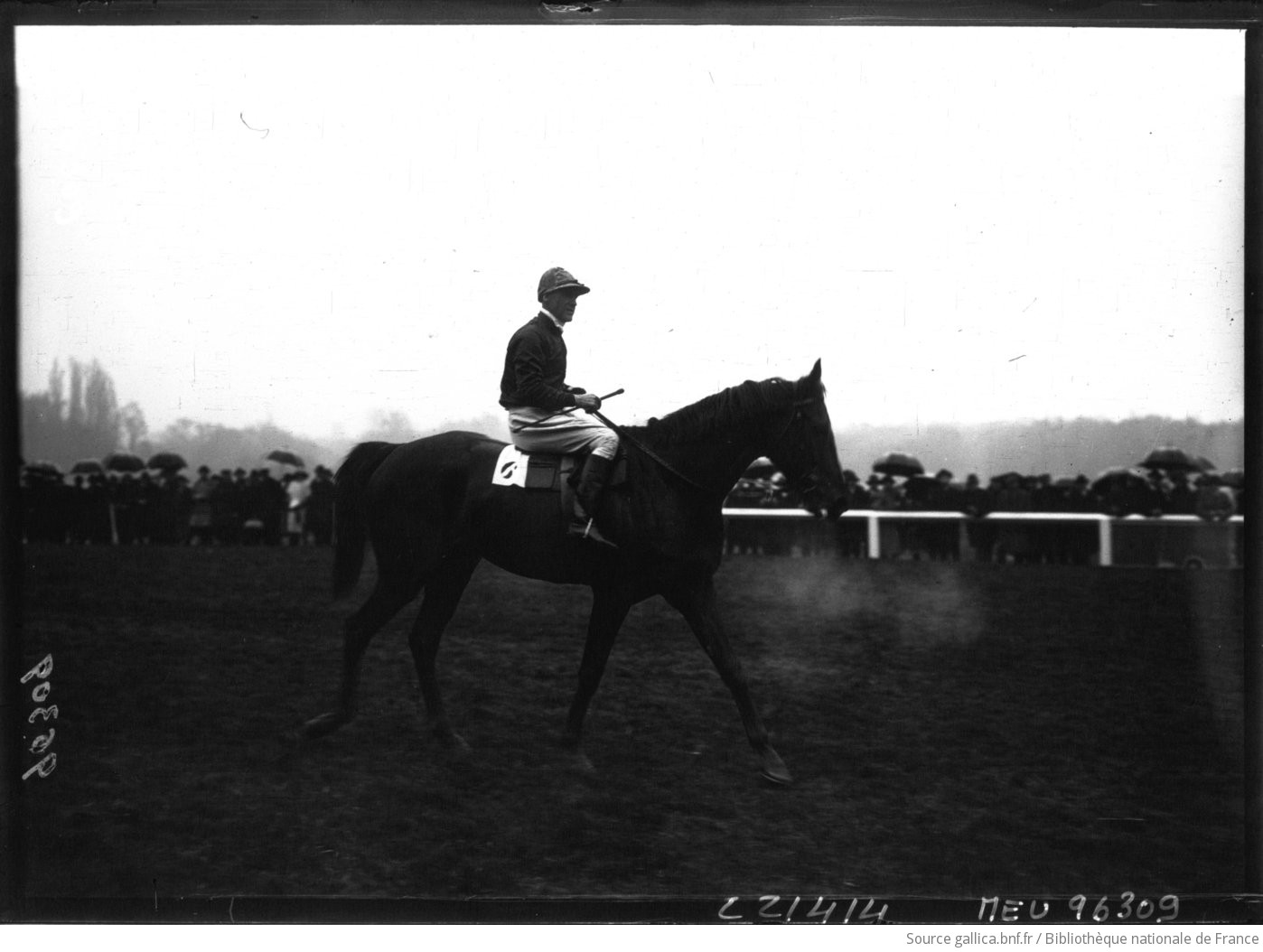
- 1922 winner Ksar
- Class: Group 1
- Location: Longchamp Racecourse; Paris, France
- Inaugurated: 1889
- Race type: Flat / Thoroughbred
- Website: france-galop.com

Race information
- Distance: 2,100 metres (1m 2½f)
- Surface: Turf
- Track: Right-handed
- Qualification: Four-years-old and up
- Weight: 58 kg Allowances; 1½ kg for fillies and mares
- Purse: €300,000 (2022); 1st: €171,420

Prix Ganay
2026
Daryz	Bright Picture	Aventure

Previous years
2025
Sosie	Map Of Stars	Royal Rhyme
2024
Haya Zark	Zarir	Feed The Flame
2023
Iresine	Simca Mille	Bay Bridge
2022
State Of Rest	Pretty Tiger	Sealiway
2021
Mare Australis	Gold Trip	Mogul

2020-2011
2020
Sottsass	Way To Paris	Shaman
2019
Waldgeist	Study Of Man	Ghaiyyath
2018
Cracksman	Wren's Day	Cloth Of Stars
2017
Cloth Of Stars	Zarak	Silverwave
2016
Dariyan	Silverwave	Garlingari
2015
Cirrus Des Aigles	Al Kazeem	Fate
2014
Cirrus Des Aigles	Treve	Norse King
2013
Pastorius	Maxios	Dunaden
2012
Cirrus Des Aigles	Giofra	Reliable Man
2011
Planteur	Sarafina	Cirrus Des Aigles

2010–2001
2010
Cutlass Bay	Shalanaya	Pallodio
2009
Vision D'Etat	Loup Breton	Adlerflug
2008
Duke Of Marmalade	Saddex	Sageburg
2007
Dylan Thomas	Irish Wells	Doctor Dino
2006
Corre Caminos	Royal Highness	Manduro
2005
Bago	Reefscape	Ace
2004
Execute	Vespone	Fair Mix
2003
Fair Mix	Execute	Falbrav
2002
Aquarelliste	Execute	Sensible
2001
Golden Snake	Egyptband	With The Flow

2000–1992
2000
Indian Danehill	Greek Dance	Chelsea Manor
1999
Dark Moondancer	Dream Well	Croco Rouge
1998
Astarabad	Que Belle	Taipan
1997
Helissio	Le Destin	Pilsudski
1996
Valanour	Luso	Swain
1995
Pelder	Alderbrook	Richard Of York
1994
Marildo	Intrepidity	Urban Sea
1993
Vert Amande	Opera House	Misil
1992
Subotica	Pistolet Bleu	Suave Dancer

The Prix Ganay is a Group 1 flat horse race in France open to thoroughbreds aged four years or older. It is run over a distance of 2,100 metres (about 1 mile and 2½ furlongs) at Longchamp in late April or early May.

== History ==
The event was established in 1889, and it was originally called the Prix des Sablons. It was initially contested over 2,000 metres, and held in late March or early April.

The Prix des Sablons was abandoned throughout World War I, with no running from 1915 to 1918. It was run at Maisons-Laffitte over 2,100 metres in 1944 and 1945.

The event was renamed in memory of Jean de Ganay (1861–1948), a former president of the Société d'Encouragement, in 1949.

The present system of race grading was introduced in 1971, and the Prix Ganay was classed at Group 1 level. From this point it was run over 2,100 metres in late April or early May.

The leading horses from the Prix Ganay often go on to compete in the Prix de l'Arc de Triomphe. The last to win both races in the same year was Daryz in 2026.

== Records ==
Most successful horse (3 wins):

- Cirrus des Aigles – 2012, 2014, 2015

Leading jockey (6 wins):

- Yves Saint-Martin – Relko (1964), Taj Dewan (1968), Rheingold (1973), Allez France (1974, 1975), Sagace (1985)

Leading trainer (8 wins):

- André Fabre – Creator (1990), Subotica (1992), Indian Danehill (2000), Cutlass Bay (2010), Cloth of Stars (2017), Waldgeist (2019), Mare Australis (2021), Sosie (2025)

Leading owner (6 wins):

- Marcel Boussac – Goyescas (1933), Goya II (1939, 1940), Djebel (1942), Goyama (1948), Nirgal (1949)

== Winners since 1970 ==
Year	Winner	Age	Jockey	Trainer	Owner	Time
1970	Grandier	6	Maurice Philipperon	John Cunnington Jr.	Mrs Pierre Ribes	2:14.20
1971	Caro	4	Maurice Philipperon	Albert Klimscha	Countess Batthyany	2:08.60
1972	Mill Reef	4	Geoff Lewis	Ian Balding	Paul Mellon	2:16.20
1973	Rheingold	4	Yves Saint-Martin	Barry Hills	Henry Zeisel	2:17.20
1974	Allez France	4	Yves Saint-Martin	Angel Penna	Daniel Wildenstein	2:23.20
1975	Allez France	5	Yves Saint-Martin	Angel Penna	Daniel Wildenstein	2:12.00
1976	Infra Green	4	Jackie Taillard	Edouard Bartholomew	Mrs J. Pochna	2:14.80
1977	Arctic Tern	4	Maurice Philipperon	John Fellows	Mrs John Knight	2:11.60
1978	Trillion	4	Lester Piggott	Maurice Zilber	Hunt / Stephenson	2:18.20
1979	Frere Basile	4	Jean-Luc Kessas	Bernard Sécly	Jean-Pierre Binet	2:17.20
1980	Le Marmot	4	Philippe Paquet	François Boutin	Rodolph Schafer	2:15.00
1981	Argument	4	Alain Lequeux	Maurice Zilber	Bruce McNall	2:12.20
1982	Bikala	4	Serge Gorli	Patrick Biancone	Jules Ouaki	2:09.70
1983	Lancastrian	6	Alain Lequeux	David Smaga	Sir Michael Sobell	2:16.90
1984	Romildo	4	Cash Asmussen	François Boutin	Gerry Oldham	2:12.00
1985	Sagace	5	Yves Saint-Martin	Patrick Biancone	Daniel Wildenstein	2:10.30
1986	Baillamont	4	Freddy Head	François Boutin	Stavros Niarchos	2:11.70
1987	Triptych	5	Tony Cruz	Patrick Biancone	Alan Clore	2:15.10
1988	Saint Andrews	4	Alain Badel	Jean-Marie Béguigné	Suzy Volterra	2:18.60
1989	Saint Andrews	5	Alain Badel	Jean-Marie Béguigné	Suzy Volterra	2:20.80
1990	Creator	4	Cash Asmussen	André Fabre	Sheikh Mohammed	2:13.00
1991	Kartajana	4	William Mongil	Alain de Royer-Dupré	Aga Khan IV	2:18.40
1992	Subotica	4	Thierry Jarnet	André Fabre	Olivier Lecerf	2:09.30
1993	Vert Amande	5	Dominique Boeuf	Élie Lellouche	Enrique Sarasola	2:21.10
1994	Marildo	7	Guy Guignard	David Smaga	David Smaga	2:11.90
1995	Pelder	5	Frankie Dettori	Paul Kelleway	Osvaldo Pedroni	2:20.70
1996	Valanour	4	Gérald Mossé	Alain de Royer-Dupré	Aga Khan IV	2:10.90
1997	Helissio	4	Olivier Peslier	Élie Lellouche	Enrique Sarasola	2:12.10
1998	Astarabad	4	Gérald Mossé	Alain de Royer-Dupré	Aga Khan IV	2:12.50
1999	Dark Moondancer	4	Gérald Mossé	Alain de Royer-Dupré	Ben Arbib	2:11.30
2000	Indian Danehill	4	Olivier Peslier	André Fabre	Edouard de Rothschild	2:27.20
2001	Golden Snake	5	Pat Eddery	John Dunlop	The National Stud	2:16.70
2002	Aquarelliste	4	Dominique Boeuf	Élie Lellouche	Ecurie Wildenstein	2:11.40
2003	Fair Mix	5	Olivier Peslier	Marcel Rolland	Ecurie Week-End	2:13.00
2004	Execute	7	Thierry Gillet	John Hammond	Ecurie Chalhoub	2:14.60
2005	Bago	4	Thierry Gillet	Jonathan Pease	Niarchos Family	2:17.70
2006	Corre Caminos	4	Thierry Jarnet	Mikel Delzangles	Marquesa de Moratalla	2:17.10
2007	Dylan Thomas	4	Christophe Soumillon	Aidan O'Brien	Magnier / Tabor	2:07.90
2008	Duke of Marmalade	4	Johnny Murtagh	Aidan O'Brien	Magnier / Tabor	2:08.30
2009	Vision d'Etat	4	Ioritz Mendizabal	Eric Libaud	Detré / Libaud	2:09.43
2010	Cutlass Bay	4	Maxime Guyon	André Fabre	Godolphin	2:11.80
2011	Planteur	4	Christophe Soumillon	Élie Lellouche	Ecurie Wildenstein	2:07.29
2012	Cirrus des Aigles	6	Olivier Peslier	Corine Barande-Barbe	Jean-Claude Dupouy	2:18.90
2013	Pastorius	4	Olivier Peslier	Mario Hofer	Stall Antanando	2:08.39
2014	Cirrus des Aigles	8	Christophe Soumillon	Corine Barande-Barbe	Jean-Claude Dupouy	2:14.13
2015	Cirrus des Aigles	9	Christophe Soumillon	Corine Barande-Barbe	Jean-Claude Dupouy	2:18.07
2016	Dariyan (Note: The 2016 and 2017 races took place at Saint-Cloud while Longchamp was closed for redevelopment)	4	Christophe Soumillon	Alain de Royer-Dupré	Aga Khan IV	2:07.72
2017	Cloth of Stars	4	Mickael Barzalona	André Fabre	Godolphin	2:11.70
2018	Cracksman	4	Frankie Dettori	John Gosden	Anthony Oppenheimer	2:09.44
2019	Waldgeist	5	Pierre-Charles Boudot	André Fabre	Ammerland / Newsells Park	2:09.07
2020	Sottsass (Note: The 2020 race was run at Chantilly in June due to the COVID-19 pandemic in France)	4	Cristian Demuro	Jean-Claude Rouget	White Birch Farm	2:06.38
2021	Mare Australis	4	Pierre-Charles Boudot	André Fabre	Gestut Schlenderhan	2:11.62
2022	State Of Rest	4	Shane Crosse	Joseph O'Brien	State Of Rest Partnership	2:08.46
2023	Iresine	6	Marie Velon	Jean-Pierre Gauvin	Bertrand Milliere	2:13.39
2024	Haya Zark	5	Alexis Pouchin	Adrien Fouassier	Odette Fau	2:13.16
2025	Sosie	4	Maxime Guyon	André Fabre	Wertheimer et Frère	2:10.71
2026	Daryz	4	Mickael Barzalona	Francis-Henri Graffard	Aga Khan Studs SCEA	2:10.26

== Earlier winners ==
- 1889: Acheron
- 1890: Le Sancy
- 1891: Barberousse
- 1892: Berenger
- 1893: Gouverneur
- 1894: Galette
- 1895: Monsieur Gabriel
- 1896: Le Sagittaire
- 1897: Champaubert
- 1898: Quilda
- 1899: Gardefeu
- 1900: Fourire
- 1901: Kremlin
- 1902: Codoman
- 1903: La Camargo
- 1904: Caius
- 1905: Caius
- 1906: Rataplan
- 1907: Maintenon
- 1908: Moulins la Marche
- 1909: L'Inconnu
- 1910: Chulo
- 1911: Ossian
- 1912: Cadet Roussel
- 1913: Shannon
- 1914: Nimbus
- 1915–18: no race
- 1919: Ramscapelle
- 1920: Samourai
- 1921: Sourbier
- 1922: Ksar
- 1923: Le Prodige
- 1924: Massine
- 1925: Cadum
- 1926: Nid d'Or
- 1927: Biribi
- 1928: Nino
- 1929: Rovigo
- 1930: Barrabas
- 1931: La Savoyarde
- 1932: Amfortas
- 1933: Goyescas
- 1934: Rodosto
- 1935: Rentenmark
- 1936: Ortolan
- 1937: Chuchoteur
- 1938: Victrix
- 1939: Goya II
- 1940: Goya II
- 1941: Maurepas
- 1942: Djebel
- 1943: Tornado / Arcot ^{1}
- 1944: Norseman
- 1945: Seer
- 1946: Basileus
- 1947: Chanteur
- 1948: Goyama
- 1949: Nirgal
- 1950: Fontenay
- 1951: Tantieme
- 1952: Mat de Cocagne
- 1953: Guersant
- 1954: Otto
- 1955: Elu
- 1956: Beau Prince
- 1957: Tanerko
- 1958: Tanerko
- 1959: Chief ^{2}
- 1960: Marino
- 1961: Javelot
- 1962: Misti
- 1963: Exbury
- 1964: Relko
- 1965: Free Ride
- 1966: Diatome
- 1967: Behistoun
- 1968: Taj Dewan
- 1969: Carmarthen

^{1} The 1943 race was a dead-heat and has joint winners.
^{2} Balbo and Malefaim finished first and second in 1959, but both were disqualified and the race was awarded to the third-placed horse.

== See also ==
- List of French flat horse races
- Recurring sporting events established in 1889 – the Prix Ganay is included under its original title, Prix des Sablons.
