= Critérium de Saint-Cloud =

Flat horse race in France

- Class: Group 1
- Location: Saint-Cloud Racecourse; Saint-Cloud, France
- Inaugurated: 1901
- Race type: Flat / Thoroughbred
- Website: france-galop.com

Race information
- Distance: 2,000 metres (1¼ miles)
- Surface: Turf
- Track: Left-handed
- Qualification: Two-year-olds excluding geldings
- Weight: 57 kg Allowances; 1½ kg for fillies
- Purse: €250,000 (2021); 1st: €142,850

Critérium de Saint-Cloud
2025
Pierre Bonnard	A Boy Named Susie	Proof

Previous years
2024
Tennessee Stud	Green Storm	Harvey
2023
Los Angeles	Stunning Peach	Illinois
2022
Dubai Mile	Arrest	Adelaide River
2021
El Bodegon	Stone Age	Goldspur

2020-2011
2020
Gear Up	Botanik	Makaloun
2019
Mkfancy	Arthur's Kingdom	Mythical
2018
Wonderment	Sydney Opera House	Fox Tal
2016
Waldgeist	Best Solution	Capri
2015
Robin Of Navan	Cloth Of Stars	Notte Bianca
2014
Epicuris	Palang	Big Blue
2013
Prince Gibraltar	Bereni Ka	Hartnell
2012
Morandi	Willie The Whipper	Miss You Too
2011
Mandaean	Brocottes	Tai Chi

2010–2000
2010
Recital	Bubble Chic	Prairie Star
2009
Passion For Gold	Mikhail Glinka	Zazou
2008
Fame And Glory	Drumbeat	Feels All Right
2007
Full Of Gold	Hannouma	Putney Bridge
2006
Passage Of Time	Soldier Of Fortune	Empire Day
2005
Linda's Lad	Fauvelia	Flashing Numbers
2004
Paita	Yehudi	Laverock
2003
Voix Du Nord	Simplex	Day Or Night
2002
Alberto Giacometti	Summerland	Marshall
2001
Ballingarry	Castle Gandolfo	Black Sam Bellamy
2000
Sagacity	Reduit	Sligo Bay

The Critérium de Saint-Cloud is a Group 1 flat horse race in France open to two-year-old thoroughbred colts and fillies. It is run at Saint-Cloud over a distance of 2,000 metres (about 1¼ miles), and it is scheduled to take place each year in late October or early November.

== History ==
The event was established in 1901, and it was originally held in September. It was initially contested over 1,400 metres, and was extended to 2,000 metres in 1906.

The race was abandoned throughout World War I, with no running from 1914 to 1919. It was cut to 1,600 metres in 1920, and restored to 2,000 metres in 1924.

Due to the closure of its venue during World War II, the Critérium de Saint-Cloud was not run from 1939 to 1945. It was staged at Longchamp in 1954.

The present system of race grading was introduced in 1971, and the Critérium de Saint-Cloud was given Group 2 status. It was promoted to Group 1 level in 1987.

Prior to 2015 the event was run in mid-November and was Europe's last Group 1 flat race of the year. In 2015 it was moved to a date a week earlier as part of a series of changes to autumn races for two-year-olds and is now run on the same day as another Group 1 race, the Critérium International.

== Records ==
Leading jockey (6 wins):

- Yves Saint-Martin – Fire Crest (1967), Rheffic (1970), Ribecourt (1973), Tarek (1977), Darshaan (1983), Mouktar (1984)
- Dominique Boeuf – Pistolet Bleu (1990), Glaieuil (1991), Marchand de Sable (1992), Spadoun (1998), Goldamix (1999), Voix du Nord (2003)

Leading trainer (8 wins):

- François Mathet – Telegram (1949), Bingo (1952), Pas de Deux (1955), Upstart (1957), Le Francais (1960), Saraca (1968), Rheffic (1970), Simbir (1972)

Leading owner (8 wins): (includes part ownership)

- Sue Magnier – Ballingarry (2001), Alberto Giacometti (2002), Fame and Glory (2008), Recital (2010), Waldgeist (2016), Los Angeles (2023), Tennessee Stud (2024), Pierre Bonnard (2025)

== Winners since 1978 ==
Year	Winner	Jockey	Trainer	Owner	Time
1978	Callio	Alain Badel	Jean Sens	Jerome Bossuyt	2:10.80
1979	Providential	Freddy Head	François Boutin	Bertram Firestone	2:22.70
1980	The Wonder	Alfred Gibert	Jacques de Chevigny	Mrs Alain du Breil	2:18.70
1981	Bon Sang	Alfred Gibert	Mitri Saliba	Mahmoud Fustok	2:17.60
1982	Escaline	Maurice Philipperon	John Fellows	Mrs John Fellows	2:26.90
1983	Darshaan	Yves Saint-Martin	Alain de Royer-Dupré	HH Aga Khan IV	2:07.40
1984	Mouktar	Yves Saint-Martin	Alain de Royer-Dupré	HH Aga Khan IV	2:25.00
1985	Fast Topaze	Alain Badel	Georges Mikhalidès	Mahmoud Fustok	2:15.50
1986	Magistros	Éric Legrix	Guy Bonnaventure	Patrick Coudert	2:23.90
1987	Waki River	Alain Lequeux	Bernard Sécly	Jacki Clérico	2:20.60
1988	Miserden	Pat Eddery	André Fabre	Khalid Abdullah	2:16.40
1989	Intimiste (Note: Snurge finished first in 1989, but he was relegated to second place following a stewards' inquiry.^{b} The 2017 running was abandoned due to protests at Saint-Cloud.)	Gérald Mossé	François Boutin	Niccolò Incisa Rocchetta	2:19.30
1990	Pistolet Bleu	Dominique Boeuf	Élie Lellouche	Daniel Wildenstein	2:17.80
1991	Glaieul	Dominique Boeuf	Élie Lellouche	Daniel Wildenstein	2:20.30
1992	Marchand de Sable	Dominique Boeuf	Élie Lellouche	Luigi de Angeli	2:19.40
1993	Sunshack	Thierry Jarnet	André Fabre	Khalid Abdullah	2:15.20
1994	Poliglote	Freddy Head	Criquette Head	Jacques Wertheimer	2:19.40
1995	Polaris Flight	John Reid	Peter Chapple-Hyam	Richard Kaster	2:13.70
1996	Shaka	Jean-René Dubosc	Jean-Claude Rouget	Robert Bousquet	2:15.80
1997	Special Quest	Olivier Doleuze	Criquette Head	Wertheimer et Frère	2:11.30
1998	Spadoun	Dominique Boeuf	Carlos Laffon-Parias	Jose Gonzalez	2:21.50
1999	Goldamix	Dominique Boeuf	Carlos Laffon-Parias	Wertheimer et Frère	2:15.70
2000	Sagacity	Olivier Peslier	André Fabre	Jean-Luc Lagardère	2:17.80
2001	Ballingarry	Jamie Spencer	Aidan O'Brien	Sue Magnier	2:24.60
2002	Alberto Giacometti	Michael Kinane	Aidan O'Brien	Sue Magnier	2:25.90
2003	Voix du Nord	Dominique Boeuf	David Smaga	Thierry van Zuylen	2:16.00
2004	Paita	Andreas Suborics	Mario Hofer	Hofer / Steigenberger	2:19.00
2005	Linda's Lad	Christophe Soumillon	André Fabre	Sean Mulryan	2:23.30
2006	Passage of Time	Richard Hughes	Henry Cecil	Khalid Abdullah	2:08.90
2007	Full of Gold	Thierry Gillet	Criquette Head-Maarek	Alec Head	2:18.10
2008	Fame and Glory	Johnny Murtagh	Aidan O'Brien	Smith / Magnier / Tabor	2:19.90
2009	Passion for Gold	Frankie Dettori	Saeed bin Suroor	Godolphin	2:19.10
2010	Recital	Johnny Murtagh	Aidan O'Brien	Magnier / Tabor et al.	2:24:80
2011	Mandaean	Maxime Guyon	André Fabre	Godolphin	2:20:20
2012	Morandi	Maxime Guyon	Jean-Claude Rouget	Daniel-Yves Trèves	2:25.30
2013	Prince Gibraltar	Christophe Soumillon	Jean-Claude Rouget	Jean-François Gribomont	2:26.25
2014	Epicuris	Thierry Thulliez	Criquette Head	Khalid Abdullah	2:17.41
2015	Robin Of Navan	Tony Piccone	Harry Dunlop	Cross, Deal, Foden, Sieff	2:15.46
2016	Waldgeist	Pierre-Charles Boudot	André Fabre	Ammerland / Newsells / Magnier	2:12.73
2017	no race ^{[b]}
2018	Wonderment	Stéphane Pasquier	Nicolas Clement	Stella Thayer	2:10.91
2019	Mkfancy	Theo Bachelot	Pia Brandt	Abdullah Al Maddah	2:20.21
2020	Gear Up	James Doyle	Mark Johnston	Teme Valley	2:21.99
2021	El Bodegon	Ioritz Mendizabal	James Ferguson	Nas Syndicate & A F O'Callaghan	2:16.93
2022	Dubai Mile	Daniel Muscutt	Charlie and Mark Johnston	Ahmad Al Shaikh	2:20.57
2023	Los Angeles	Christophe Soumillon	Aidan O'Brien	Westerberg/Tabor / Smith / Magnier	2:15.25
2024	Tennessee Stud	Dylan Browne McMonagle	Joseph O'Brien	Westerberg/Tabor / Smith / Magnier	2:16.08
2025	Pierre Bonnard	Christophe Soumillon	Aidan O'Brien	Magnier / Tabor/ Smith/ Westerberg	2:08.31
2026	Drumbeat	Ryan Moore	Aidan O'Brien	Westerberg / Magnier / Tabor / Smith	2:07.21

== Earlier winners ==
- 1901: Illinois
- 1902: Marigold
- 1903: Maidensblush
- 1904: Fier
- 1905: Belle Fleur
- 1906: La Belle
- 1907: Talo Biribil
- 1908: Clinquant
- 1909: Hunyade
- 1910: Matchless
- 1911: Mongolie
- 1912: La Ribaude
- 1913: Regent's Park
- 1914–19: no race
- 1920: Black Larry
- 1921: Rocking Chair
- 1922: Sylvan
- 1923: Fetz el Rih
- 1924: Sizain
- 1925: Becassine
- 1926: Eneas
- 1927: Motrico
- 1928: Cordial
- 1929: La Voulzie
- 1930: Barneveldt
- 1931: De Beers / Incessu Patuit *
- 1932: Amador
- 1933: El Lando
- 1934: Skiff
- 1935: Treignac
- 1936: Tonnelle
- 1937: Canot
- 1938: Tricameron
- 1939–45: no race
- 1946: Rhetorius
- 1947:
- 1948:
- 1949: Telegram
- 1950: Aquino
- 1951:
- 1952: Bingo
- 1953: Sica Boy
- 1954: Ahmose
- 1955: Pas de Deux
- 1956: Lofoten
- 1957: Upstart
- 1958: Le Loup Garou
- 1959: Marella
- 1960: Le Francais
- 1961: Tracy
- 1962: Ad Valorem
- 1963: Le Fabuleux
- 1964: Carvin
- 1965: Sea Hawk
- 1966: Pointille
- 1967: Fire Crest
- 1968: Saraca
- 1969: Stintino
- 1970: Rheffic
- 1971: Gay Saint
- 1972: Simbir
- 1973: Ribecourt
- 1974: Easy Regent
- 1975: Kano
- 1976: Conglomerat
- 1977: Tarek

* The 1931 race was a dead-heat and has joint winners.

== See also ==
- List of French flat horse races
