= Allied Powers (horse) =

Irish-bred Thoroughbred racehorse

- Sire: Invincible Spirit
- Grandsire: Green Desert
- Dam: Always Friendly
- Damsire: High Line
- Sex: Gelding
- Foaled: 23 March 2005
- Country: Ireland
- Colour: Bay
- Breeder: Saad bin Mishrif
- Owner: David Fish and Edward Ware
- Trainer: Michael Bell
- Record: 39:8-5-5
- Earnings: £292,882

Major wins
- Prix d'Hédouville (2010, 2012); Grand Prix de Chantilly (2010)

Allied Powers is a retired Irish horse trained by Michael Bell and owned by David Fish and Edward Ware. He is the winner of Group Three Prix D'Hedouville at Longchamp and Group Two Grand Prix de Chantilly at Chantilly. Allied Powers was bred in Ireland and is a son of Invincible Spirit (dam: Always Friendly).

Allied Powers won his first race in April 2008 at Pontefract Racecourse. He won the race, a 12-furlong handicap over heavy ground, with ease and followed it up with two more wins in as many races. The first, a handicap also 12 furlongs at Chester Racecourse, saw him beat second-place Patkai by two and a half lengths. His third consecutive victory came in an 11-furlong handicap at Newbury Racecourse. These three wins saw Allied Powers' handicap rating increase from 68 to 82 in less than a month. His next victory came four races later, when he won the Kilkerran Cup at Ayr Racecourse in Scotland at a mile and a quarter over heavy going.

May 2009 saw Allied Powers win a Listed race in his first attempt. Ridden by Micky Fenton (who also rode him to victory at Ayr), Allied Powers won the Braveheart Stakes, comfortably beating Lady Jane Digby by four and a half lengths. This impressive win in Listed company saw Allied Powers take a step up to Group races.

In July, Allied Powers ran in his first Group 2 race off a rating of 106 in the York Stakes. The 10 1/2-furlong race was run on good ground and Allied Powers, this time ridden by Paul Hanagan, finished second to Godolphin-owned Kirklees. His four-year-old season ended with a trip to Toronto for the Canadian International Stakes, a Grade 1 event run at Woodbine Racetrack. Ridden by Jim Crowley, Allied Powers only managed to finish seventh, probably due to the fast going which was unfavourable for him.

With a rating of 111, Allied Powers began his five-year-old campaign in 2010 with the Group 3 John Porter Stakes at Newbury Racecourse. He finished twelfth in a race won by Harbinger, who would go on to win the King George VI and Queen Elizabeth Stakes by 11 lengths. In May, Allied Powers headed to Paris and won the Prix D'Hedouville, a Group 3 race at Longchamp Racecourse, under French champion jockey Ioritz Mendizabal. A month later Allied Powers returned to France to easily win the Group 2 Grand Prix de Chantilly, ridden again by Mendizabal. Following success in Group 3 and Group 2 races, Allied Powers' next engagement was a Group 1 race in Hamburg. Once again, the ground proved to be a problem for Allied Powers as he finished fifth a length and a half behind the winner, Campanologist, a fast-track specialist.

With a rating of 114 as of September 2010, Allied Powers was scheduled to compete in the Grosser Preis von Baden, a Group 1 race in Baden-Baden, Germany.

2010–2014
