= French flat racing Champion Jockey =

The title of French flat racing Champion Jockey is awarded to the jockey who rides most flat winners in France. The championship used to run the whole calendar year, but since 2022, it runs from 1 March to 31 October. The change was made to revive the competition and make it more appealing to younger jockeys. The name of the awards in French is Cravache d'Or (Golden Whip) for the winner, Cravache d'Argent (Silver Whip) for the runner-up and Cravache de Bronze (Bronze Whip) for the third jockey.

== Flat racing Cravache d'Or classification ==
Year	Winner	Wins	Runner up	Third
2024	Maxime Guyon	192	Mickael Barzalona	Alexis Pouchin
2023	Maxime Guyon	196	Mickael Barzalona	Cristian Demuro
2022	Maxime Guyon	191	Mickael Barzalona	Christophe Soumillon
2021	Mickael Barzalona	192	Maxime Guyon	Théo Bachelot
2020	Pierre-Charles Boudot	220	Maxime Guyon	Cristian Demuro
2019	Maxime Guyon	234	Pierre-Charles Boudot	Mickael Barzalona
2018	Christophe Soumillon	184	Pierre-Charles Boudot	Maxime Guyon
2017	Christophe Soumillon	305	Pierre-Charles Boudot	Maxime Guyon
2016	Pierre-Charles Boudot	300	Maxime Guyon	Christophe Soumillon
2015	Christophe Soumillon; Pierre-Charles Boudot	179	-	Maxime Guyon
2014	Christophe Soumillon	168	Maxime Guyon	Pierre-Charles Boudot
2013	Christophe Soumillon	228	Maxime Guyon	Pierre-Charles Boudot
2012	Christophe Soumillon	165	Maxime Guyon	Ioritz Mendizabal
2011	Christophe Soumillon	162	Maxime Guyon	Ioritz Mendizabal
2010	Ioritz Mendizabal	170	Maxime Guyon	Franck Blondel
2009	Ioritz Mendizabal	180	Stéphane Pasquier	Maxime Guyon
2008	Ioritz Mendizabal	202	Christophe Soumillon	Stéphane Pasquier
2007	Stéphane Pasquier	185	Ioritz Mendizabal	Christophe Soumillon
2006	Christophe Soumillon	176	Ioritz Mendizabal	Dominique Boeuf
2005	Christophe Soumillon	226	Stéphane Pasquier	Ioritz Mendizabal
2004	Ioritz Mendizabal	220	Christophe Soumillon	Olivier Peslier
2003	Christophe Soumillon	207	Ioritz Mendizabal	Dominique Boeuf
2002	Dominique Boeuf	151	Christophe Soumillon	Ioritz Mendizabal
2001	Dominique Boeuf	149	Olivier Peslier	Davy Bonilla
2000	Olivier Peslier	162	Thierry Jarnet	Davy Bonilla
1999	Olivier Peslier	147	Dominique Boeuf	Gérald Mossé
1998	Dominique Boeuf	175	Jean-René Dubosc	Olivier Peslier
1997	Olivier Peslier	157	Dominique Boeuf	Thierry Jarnet
1996	Olivier Peslier	163	Thierry Jarnet	Gérald Mossé
1995	Thierry Jarnet	154	Olivier Peslier	Gérald Mossé
1994	Thierry Jarnet	158	Olivier Peslier	Gérald Mossé
1993	Thierry Jarnet	157	Cash Asmussen	Olivier Peslier
1992	Thierry Jarnet
1991	Dominique Boeuf
1990	Cash Asmussen
1989	Cash Asmussen
1988	Cash Asmussen
1987	Gary W Moore	102
1986	Cash Asmussen
1985	Cash Asmussen
1984	Freddy Head	134
1983	Yves Saint-Martin
1982	Freddy Head
1981	Yves Saint-Martin
1980	Freddy Head
1979	Philippe Paquet
1978	Alfred Gibert
1977	Philippe Paquet
1976	Yves Saint-Martin
1975	Yves Saint-Martin
1974	Yves Saint-Martin
1973	Yves Saint-Martin
1972	Freddy Head
1971	Freddy Head
1970	Freddy Head
1969	Yves Saint-Martin
1968	Yves Saint-Martin
1967	Yves Saint-Martin
1966	Yves Saint-Martin
1965	Yves Saint-Martin
1964	Yves Saint-Martin
1963	Yves Saint-Martin
1962	Neville Sellwood	102	Yves Saint-Martin
1961	Maxime Garcia
1960	Yves Saint-Martin
1959	Jean Deforge
1958	Jean Deforge

== Most successful jockeys ==
- Yves Saint-Martin - 15 wins
- Christophe Soumillon - 10 wins
- Freddy Head - 6 wins
- Cash Asmussen - 5 wins

== See also ==
- British flat racing Champion Jockey
- Irish flat racing Champion Jockey
- United States Champion Jockey by wins
- United States Champion Jockey by earnings
