= Grand Prix de Saint-Cloud =

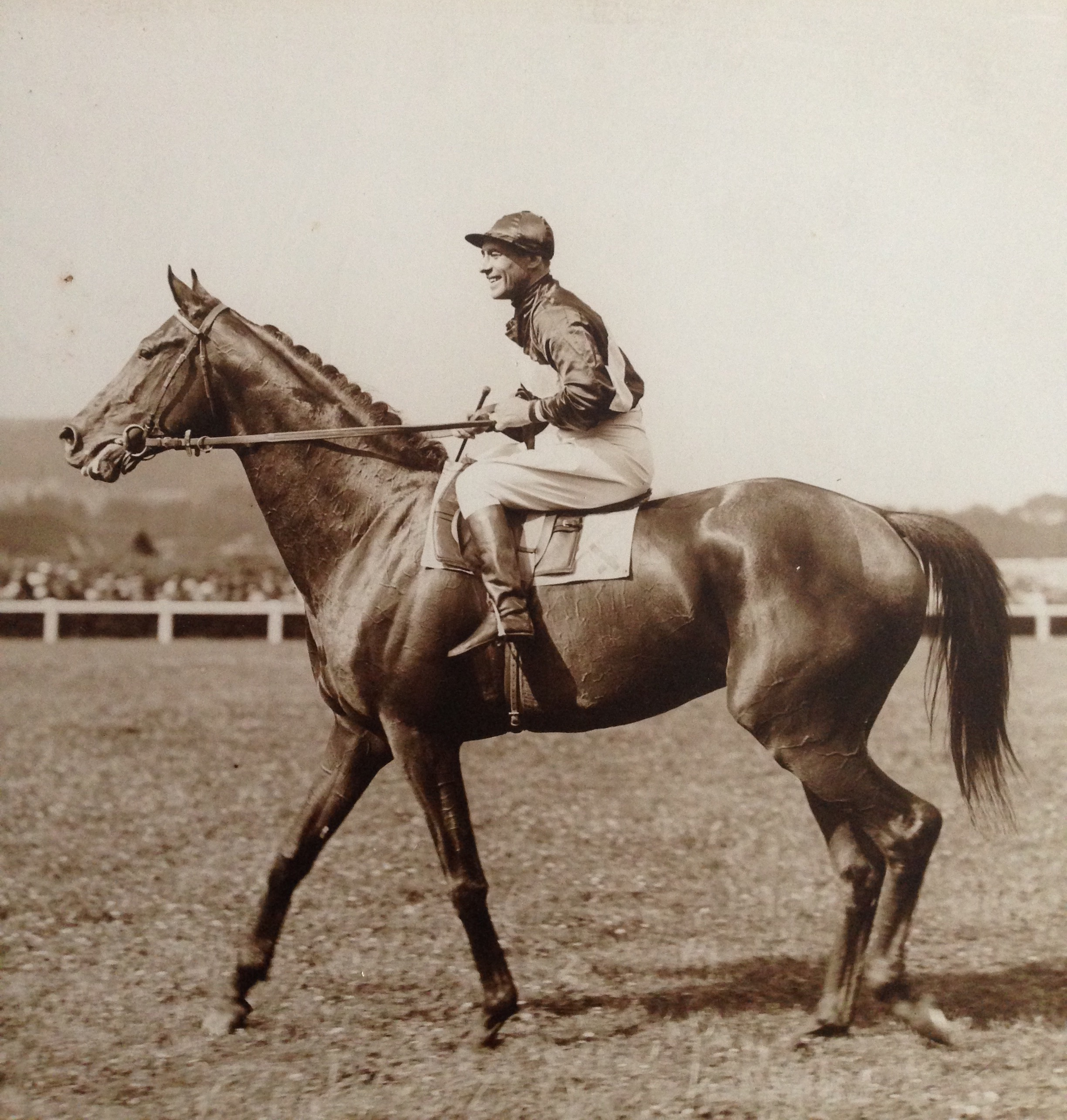
- Prince Rose when he won in 1932 with his Belgian rider Cornelius Morjau
- Class: Group 1
- Location: Saint-Cloud Racecourse; Saint-Cloud, France
- Inaugurated: 1904
- Race type: Flat / Thoroughbred
- Website: Official website

Race information
- Distance: 2,400 metres (1½ miles)
- Surface: Turf
- Track: Left-handed
- Qualification: Four years old and up
- Weight: 58 kg Allowances; 1½ kg for fillies and mares
- Purse: €400,000 (2022); 1st: €228,560

Grand Prix de Saint-Cloud
2026
Calandagan	Cualificar	Sunly

Previous years
2025
Calandagan	Aventure	Junko
2024
Dubai Honour	Feed The Flame	Point Lonsdale
2023
Westover	Zagrey	Junko
2022
Alpinista	Baratti	Bubble Gift
2021
Broome	Ebaiyra	Gold Trip

2020-2011
2020
Way To Paris	Nagano Gold	Ziyad
2019
Coronet	Ziyad	Lah Ti Dar
2018
Waldgeist	Coronet	Salouen
2017
Zarak	Silverwave	Armande
2016
Silverwave	Erupt	Siljan's Saga
2015
Treve	Flintshire	Dolniya
2014
Noble Mission	Siljan's Saga	Narniyn
2013
Novellist	Dunaden	Haya Landa
2012
Meandre	Shareta	Galikova
2011
Sarafina	Cirrus Des Aigles	Silver Pond

2010–2001
2010
Plumania	Youmzain	Daryakana
2009
Spanish Moon	Alpine Rose	Youmzain
2008
Youmzain	Soldier Of Fortune	Doctor Dino
2007
Mountain High	Mandesha	Prince Flori
2006
Pride	Hurricane Run	Laverock
2005
Alkaased	Policy Maker	Bago
2004
Gamut	Policy Maker	Visorama
2003
Ange Gabriel	Polish Summer	Loxias
2002
Ange Gabriel	Polish Summer	Aquarelliste
2001
Mirio	Perfect Sunday	Egyptband

2000–1994
2000
Montjeu	Daring Miss	Sagamix
1999
El Condor Pasa	Tiger Hill	Dream Well
1998
Fragrant Mix	Romanov	Gazelle Royale
1997
Helissio	Magellano	Riyadian
1996
Helissio	Swain	Poliglote
1995
Carnegie	Luso	Only Royale
1994
Apple Tree	Muhtarram	Zimzalabim
1993
User Friendly	Apple Tree	Modhish
1992
Pistolet Bleu	Magic Night	Subotica
1991
Epervier Bleu	Rock Hopper	Passing Sale
1990
In The Wings	Ode	Zartota

The Grand Prix de Saint-Cloud is a Group 1 flat horse race in France open to thoroughbreds aged four years or older. It is run at Saint-Cloud over a distance of 2,400 metres (about 1½ miles), and it is scheduled to take place each year in late June or early July.

== History ==
The event was established in 1904, and it was originally called the Prix du Président de la République (French for 'Prize of the President of the Republic'). It was initially contested at Maisons-Laffitte over 2,500 metres by horses aged three or older. It was abandoned throughout World War I, with no running from 1915 to 1918. It resumed at Saint-Cloud in 1919.

The race was cancelled once during World War II, in 1940. Its original title was discarded in 1941, following the end of the French Third Republic. The newly named Grand Prix de Saint-Cloud was run at Longchamp (1941–42), Maisons-Laffitte (1943, 1945) and Le Tremblay (1944) before returning to Saint-Cloud in 1946.

The present system of race grading was introduced in 1971, and the Grand Prix de Saint-Cloud was classed at Group 1 level. It was cut to 2,400 metres in 1987, and closed to three-year-olds in 2005.

== Records ==
Most successful horse (2 wins):

- Nino – 1926, 1927
- Tanerko – 1957, 1958
- Rheingold – 1972, 1973
- Helissio – 1996, 1997
- Ange Gabriel – 2002, 2003
- Calandagan – 2025, 2026

Leading jockey (7 wins):

- Yves Saint-Martin – Relko (1964), Rheingold (1972, 1973), Dahlia (1974), Shakapour (1980, dead-heat), Akarad (1981), Strawberry Road (1985)

Leading trainer (8 wins):

- François Mathet – Tanerko (1957, 1958), Dicta Drake (1961), Match (1962), Relko (1964), Exceller (1977), Shakapour (1980, dead-heat), Akarad (1981)
- André Fabre – Village Star (1988), In the Wings (1990), Apple Tree (1994), Carnegie (1995), Fragrant Mix (1998), Plumania (2010), Meandre (2012), Waldgeist (2018)

Leading owner (5 wins):

- Marcel Boussac – Corrida (1936), Djebel (1942), Ardan (1945), Coaraze (1946), Goyama (1948)

== Winners since 1970 ==
Year	Winner	Age	Jockey	Trainer	Owner	Time
1970	Gyr	3	Bill Williamson	Etienne Pollet	Winston Guest	2:36.80
1971	Ramsin	4	Henri Samani	Geoffroy Watson	Thierry van Zuylen	2:43.70
1972	Rheingold	3	Yves Saint-Martin	Barry Hills	Henry Zeisel	2:41.90
1973	Rheingold	4	Yves Saint-Martin	Barry Hills	Henry Zeisel	2:35.60
1974	Dahlia	4	Yves Saint-Martin	Maurice Zilber	Nelson Bunker Hunt	2:39.40
1975	Un Kopeck	4	Maurice Philipperon	John Cunnington Jr.	Jacques Marx	2:38.00
1976	Riverqueen	3	Freddy Head	Christian Datessen	Ghislaine Head	2:34.90
1977	Exceller	4	Freddy Head	François Mathet	Nelson Bunker Hunt	2:32.80
1978	Guadanini	4	Henri Samani	Richard Carver Jr.	Joseph Kaida	2:41.70
1979	Gay Mecene	4	Freddy Head	Alec Head	Jacques Wertheimer	2:33.40
1980 (dh)	Dunette; Shakapour	4; 3	Georges Doleuze; Yves Saint-Martin	E. Chevalier du Fau; François Mathet	Mrs Harry Love; Aga Khan IV	2:39.80
1981	Akarad	3	Yves Saint-Martin	François Mathet	Aga Khan IV	2:38.90
1982	Glint of Gold	4	Pat Eddery	Ian Balding	Paul Mellon	2:41.40
1983	Diamond Shoal	4	Steve Cauthen	Ian Balding	Paul Mellon	2:34.90
1984	Teenoso	4	Lester Piggott	Geoff Wragg	Eric Moller	2:34.50
1985	Strawberry Road	6	Yves Saint-Martin	Patrick Biancone	Daniel Wildenstein	2:34.50
1986	Acatenango	4	Steve Cauthen	Heinz Jentzsch	Gestüt Fährhof	2:37.20
1987	Moon Madness	4	Pat Eddery	John Dunlop	Duchess of Norfolk	2:26.50
1988	Village Star	5	Cash Asmussen	André Fabre	Tony Richards	2:36.30
1989	Sheriff's Star	4	Tony Ives	Lady Herries	Duchess of Norfolk	2:35.80
1990	In the Wings	4	Cash Asmussen	André Fabre	Sheikh Mohammed	2:29.60
1991	Epervier Bleu	4	Dominique Boeuf	Élie Lellouche	Daniel Wildenstein	2:28.10
1992	Pistolet Bleu	4	Dominique Boeuf	Élie Lellouche	Daniel Wildenstein	2:30.30
1993	User Friendly	4	George Duffield	Clive Brittain	Bill Gredley	2:28.50
1994	Apple Tree	5	Thierry Jarnet	André Fabre	Sultan Al Kabeer	2:30.60
1995	Carnegie	4	Thierry Jarnet	André Fabre	Sheikh Mohammed	2:35.20
1996	Helissio	3	Olivier Peslier	Élie Lellouche	Enrique Sarasola	2:27.40
1997	Helissio	4	Cash Asmussen	Élie Lellouche	Enrique Sarasola	2:29.50
1998	Fragrant Mix	4	Olivier Peslier	André Fabre	Jean-Luc Lagardère	2:31.30
1999	El Condor Pasa	4	Masayoshi Ebina	Yoshitaka Ninomiya	Takashi Watanabe	2:28.80
2000	Montjeu	4	Cash Asmussen	John Hammond	Michael Tabor	2:31.40
2001	Mirio	4	Christophe Soumillon	J. M. de Choubersky	Erik Soderberg	2:29.30
2002	Ange Gabriel	4	Thierry Jarnet	Eric Libaud	Antonia Devin	2:28.60
2003	Ange Gabriel	5	Thierry Jarnet	Eric Libaud	Antonia Devin	2:30.90
2004	Gamut	5	Kieren Fallon	Sir Michael Stoute	Gay Smith	2:36.10
2005	Alkaased	5	Frankie Dettori	Luca Cumani	Mike Charlton	2:31.30
2006	Pride	6	Christophe Lemaire	Alain de Royer-Dupré	NP Bloodstock Ltd	2:35.90
2007	Mountain High	5	Kieren Fallon	Sir Michael Stoute	Magnier / Tabor	2:29.70
2008	Youmzain	5	Richard Hughes	Mick Channon	Jaber Abdullah	2:28.20
2009	Spanish Moon	5	Ryan Moore	Sir Michael Stoute	Khalid Abdullah	2:27.40
2010	Plumania	4	Olivier Peslier	André Fabre	Wertheimer et Frère	2:34.40
2011	Sarafina	4	Christophe Lemaire	Alain de Royer-Dupré	Aga Khan IV	2:34.40
2012	Meandre	4	Maxime Guyon	André Fabre	Rothschild Family	2:31.50
2013	Novellist	4	Ryan Moore	Andreas Wöhler	Dr Christoph Berglar	2:31.12
2014	Noble Mission ^{[a]}	5	James Doyle	Lady Cecil	Khalid Abdullah	2:34.83
2015	Treve	5	Thierry Jarnet	Criquette Head-Maarek	Al Shaqab Racing	2:27.59
2016	Silverwave	4	Maxime Guyon	Pascal Bary	Hspirit	2:29.20
2017	Zarak	4	Christophe Soumillon	Alain de Royer-Dupré	Aga Khan IV	2:27.76
2018	Waldgeist	4	Pierre-Charles Boudot	André Fabre	Ammerland / Newsells	2:30.14
2019	Coronet	5	Frankie Dettori	John Gosden	Denford Stud	2:28.66
2020	Way to Paris	7	Pierre-Charles Boudot	Andrea Marcelis	Paolo Ferrario	2:29.98
2021	Broome	5	Colin Keane	Aidan O'Brien	Matsushima/ Magnier/ Tabor/ Smith	2:29.11
2022	Alpinista	5	Luke Morris	Sir Mark Prescott	Kirsten Rausing	2:26.15
2023	Westover	4	Rob Hornby	Ralph Beckett	Juddmonte	2:25.46
2024	Dubai Honour	6	Tom Marquand	William Haggas	Mohamed Obaida	2:30.30
2025	Calandagan	4	Mickael Barzalona	Francis-Henri Graffard	Aga Khan Studs	2:28.28
2026	Calandagan	5	Mickael Barzalona	Francis-Henri Graffard	Aga Khan Studs	2:27.27

^{a} Spiritjim finished first in 2014, but was disqualified after failing a drug test.

== Earlier winners ==
- 1904: Gouvernant
- 1905: Finasseur
- 1906: Maintenon
- 1907: Querido
- 1908: Sea Sick
- 1909: Verdun
- 1910: Oversight
- 1911: Ossian
- 1912: De Viris
- 1913: Predicateur
- 1914: Sardanapale
- 1915–18: no race
- 1919: Radames
- 1920: Eugene de Savoie
- 1921: Pomme de Terre
- 1922: Kircubbin
- 1923: Bahadur
- 1924: Pot au Feu
- 1925: Cadum
- 1926: Nino
- 1927: Nino
- 1928: Mon Talisman
- 1929: Bubbles
- 1930: Feb
- 1931: Barneveldt
- 1932: Prince Rose
- 1933: Macaroni
- 1934: Assuerus
- 1935: Louqsor
- 1936: Corrida
- 1937: Vatellor
- 1938: Victrix
- 1939: Genievre
- 1940: no race
- 1941: Maurepas
- 1942: Djebel
- 1943: Escamillo
- 1944: Un Gaillard
- 1945: Ardan
- 1946: Coaraze
- 1947: Yong Lo
- 1948: Goyama
- 1949: Medium
- 1950: Ocarina
- 1951: Violoncelle
- 1952: Fast Fox
- 1953: Magnific
- 1954: Banassa
- 1955: Chingacgook
- 1956: Burgos / Oroso *
- 1957: Tanerko
- 1958: Tanerko
- 1959: Herbager
- 1960: Sheshoon
- 1961: Dicta Drake
- 1962: Match
- 1963: Exbury
- 1964: Relko
- 1965: Sea Bird
- 1966: Sea Hawk
- 1967: Taneb
- 1968: Hopeful Venture
- 1969: Felicio

* The 1956 race was a dead-heat and has joint winners.

== See also ==
- List of French flat horse races
- Recurring sporting events established in 1904 – this race is included under its original title, Prix du Président de la République.
