= Dominique Boeuf =

French jockey

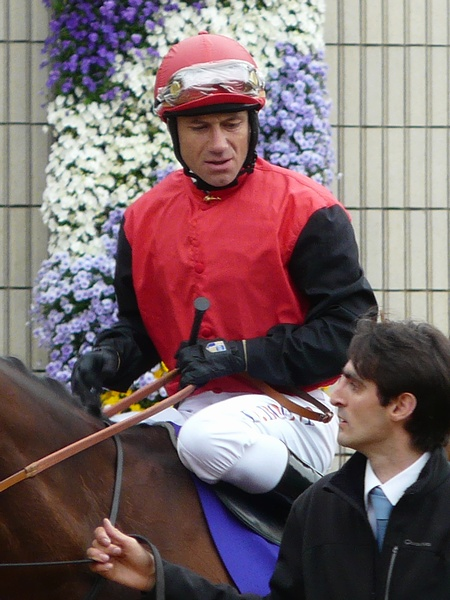

Personal information
- Born: 6 June 1968 (age 58) Maisons-Laffitte, France
- Occupation: Jockey

Horse racing career
- Sport: Horse racing
- Career wins: Ongoing

Major racing wins
- Prix de Guiche (1987); Prix Lupin (1987, 1990, 1996, 2004); Grand Prix de Deauville (1989, 1990, 2003, 2006); Prix Eugène Adam (1989); Prix d'Hédouville (1989, 1992); Critérium de Saint-Cloud (1990, 1991, 1992, 1998, 1999, 2003); Grand Prix d'Évry (1990, 1992); Prix Dollar (1990); Prix Exbury (1990, 2003); Prix Greffulhe (1990); Prix Robert Papin (1990); Poule d'Essai des Pouliches (1991); Prix du Calvados (1991); Prix de la Forêt (1991); Prix Hocquart (1991); Prix Jean Prat (1991); Prix Noailles (1991, 1996, 2003); Prix du Gros Chêne (1992, 1998); Prix Maurice de Nieuil (1992, 1995, 2002); Prix Niel (1992); Prix du Conseil de Paris (1993, 2003); Prix Ganay (1993, 2002); Prix de Meautry (1993); Prix de Royallieu (1993, 1998); Prix Daniel Wildenstein (1995, 2003, 2005); Prix d'Astarté (1998, 2003); Prix de Sandringham (1998); Critérium de Maisons-Laffitte (1999); Prix Saint-Alary (2001); Prix Vermeille (2001); Prix Vicomtesse Vigier (2001); Prix Foy (2002); Prix de l'Opéra (2002, 2008); Prix Royal-Oak (2002, 2003); Prix du Cadran (2003, 2007); Prix de Pomone (2003); Prix Gladiateur (2006); Critérium International (2008) French Classic Race wins: Grand Prix de Saint-Cloud (1991, 1992); Prix de Diane (2001, 2002) International race wins: Sussex Stakes (1993); Falmouth Stakes (1999); Hong Kong Vase (2003); Preis von Europa (2008)

Racing awards
- French flat racing Champion Jockey (1991, 1998, 2001, 2002)

Significant horses
- Groom Dancer, Pistolet Bleu, Epervier Bleu, Danseuse du Soir, Vert Amande, Bright Sky; Helissio, Aquarelliste, Bigstone, Westerner
- Updated on 9 May 2007

Dominique Boeuf (born 6 June 1968 at Maisons-Laffitte, France) is a jockey in Thoroughbred flat racing. He began his career while still a teen and won his first race on 15 September 1984. Three years later, he got his first Group One win aboard Groom Dancer in the 1987 Prix Lupin. From there, he went on to become the French flat racing Champion Jockey four times.

In 2003, Boeuf won the Air Mauritius / Beau Rivage International Jockeys Day.

== Major wins ==
France

- Prix de Diane - (2) - Aquarelliste (2001), Bright Sky (2002)
- Poule d'Essai des Pouliches - (1) - Danseuse du Soir (1991)
- Critérium de Saint-Cloud - (6) - Pistolet Bleu (1990), Glaieul (1991), Marchand de Sable (1992), Spadoun (1998), Goldamix (1999), Voix du Nord (2003)
- Grand Prix de Saint-Cloud - (2) - Epervier Bleu (1991), Pistolet Bleu (1992)
- Prix du Cadran - (2) - Westerner (2003), Le Miracle (2007)
- Prix de la Forêt - (1) - Danseuse du Soir (1991)
- Prix Ganay - (2) - Vert Amande (1993), Aquarelliste (2002)
- Prix Jean Prat - (1) - Sillery (1991)
- Prix Lupin - (4) - Groom Dancer (1987), Epervier Bleu (1990), Helissio (1996), Voix du Nord (2004)
- Prix de l'Opéra - (2) - Bright Sky (2002), Lady Marian (2008)
- Critérium international - (1) - Zafisio (2008)
- Prix Royal-Oak - (2) - Mr Dinos (2002), Westerner (2003)
- Prix Saint-Alary - (1) - Nadia (2001)
- Prix Vermeille - (1) - Aquarelliste (2001)

United Kingdom

- Sussex Stakes - (1) - Bigstone (1993)
- Falmouth Stakes - (1) - Ronda (1999)

Germany

- Preis von Europa - (1) - Baila Me (2009)

Hong Kong

- Hong Kong Vase - (1) - Vallée Enchantée (2003)
