= Waldgeist =

British-bred Thoroughbred racehorse

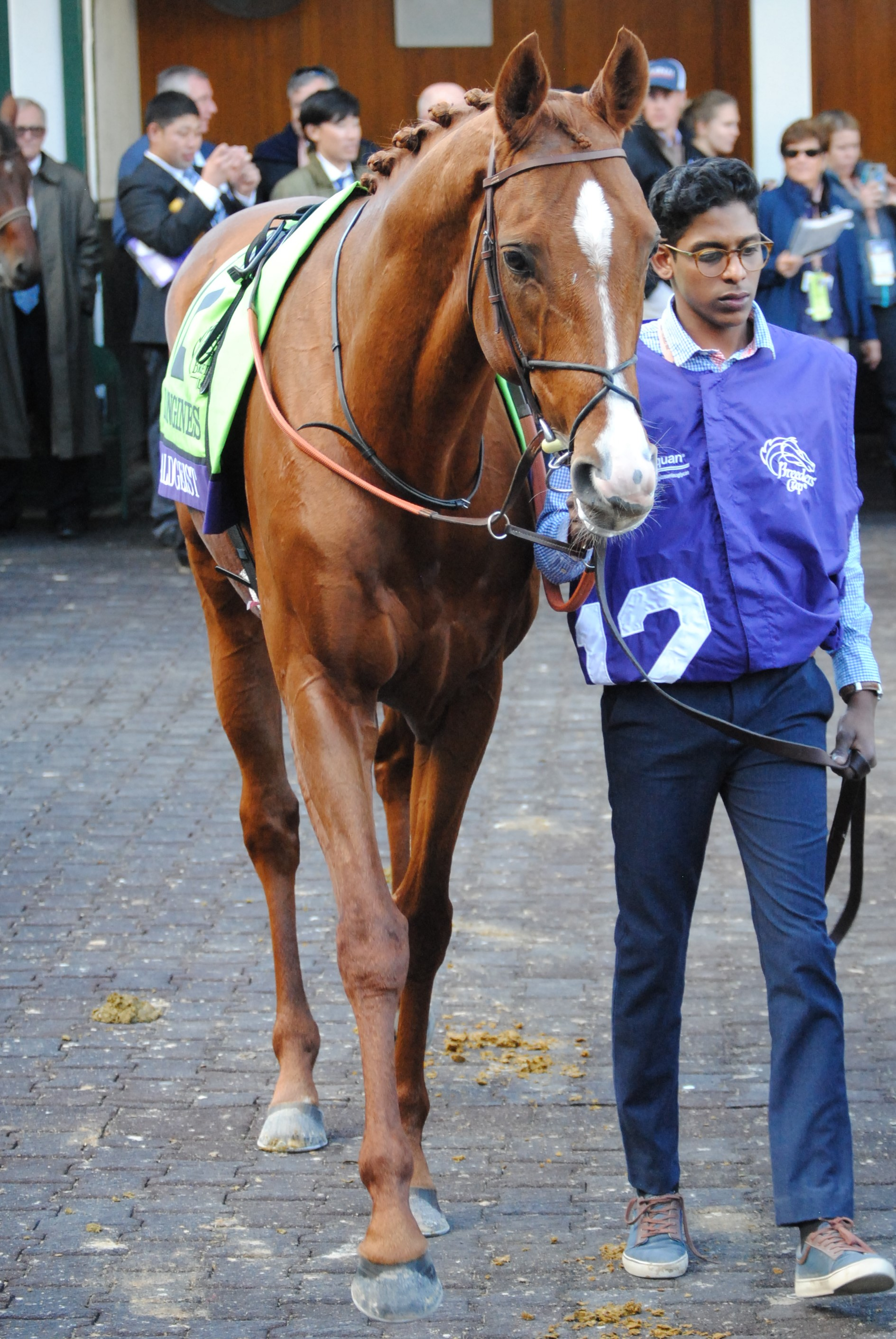
- Waldgeist at the 2018 Breeders' Cup
- Sire: Galileo
- Grandsire: Sadler's Wells
- Dam: Waldlerche
- Damsire: Monsun
- Sex: Stallion
- Foaled: 17 February 2014
- Country: United Kingdom
- Colour: Chestnut
- Breeder: Waldlerche Partnership
- Owner: Gestut Ammerland, Newsells Park & Coolmore Stud
- Trainer: André Fabre
- Record: 21: 9-3-3
- Earnings: £4,298,561

Major wins
- Critérium de Saint-Cloud (2016); Prix d'Hédouville (2018); Grand Prix de Chantilly (2018); Grand Prix de Saint-Cloud (2018); Prix Foy (2018, 2019); Prix Ganay (2019); Prix de l'Arc de Triomphe (2019)

Waldgeist (foaled 17 February 2014) is a British-bred, French-trained Thoroughbred racehorse. He has raced in six countries, namely France, Ireland, the United Kingdom, Germany, the United States and Hong Kong. He showed top-class form as a two-year-old in 2016 when he won two of his three races including the Group 1 Critérium de Saint-Cloud. He failed to win in the following year but ran second in the Prix du Jockey Club and fourth in the Irish Derby. In 2018 he won four consecutive races, namely the Prix d'Hédouville, Grand Prix de Chantilly, Grand Prix de Saint-Cloud (Group 1) and Prix Foy. In 2019 he won a third Group 1 race when he took the Prix Ganay and recorded his biggest win in October when he took the Prix de l'Arc de Triomphe.

== Background ==
Waldgeist is a chestnut horse with a white blaze bred in England by the Waldlerche Partnership. During his racing career he was owned by a partnership involving Gestut Ammerland, Newsells Park Stud and various members of the Coolmore Stud organization. He was sent into training with André Fabre in France.

He was sired by Galileo, who won the Derby, Irish Derby and King George VI and Queen Elizabeth Stakes in 2001. Galileo became one of the world's leading stallions, earning his tenth champion sire of Great Britain and Ireland title in 2018. His other progeny include Cape Blanco, Frankel, Golden Lilac, Nathaniel, New Approach, Rip Van Winkle, Found Minding and Ruler of the World. Waldgeist's dam Waldlerche showed high class form in France, winning the Prix Penelope in 2012. before becoming a successful broodmare whose other foals have included the Prix de Malleret winner Waldlied. Waldlerche was a half-sister to the St Leger winner Masked Marvel and closely related to the Deutsches Derby winner Waldpark.

== Racing career ==
=== 2016: two-year-old season ===
Waldgeist made his debut in a maiden race over 1600 metres at Chantilly Racecourse on 8 September in which he started odds-on favourite and won by two lengths from Called To The Bar, a colt who went on to win several Group races. He was stepped up in class for the Group 3 Prix de Condé over 1800 metres at the same track a month later but despite starting favourite he finished third in a three-way photo finish, beaten a neck and a short head by Frankuus and Prinz Hlodowig. Twelve days later the colt was moved up to the highest class for the Group 1 Critérium de Saint-Cloud over 2000 metres on soft ground and started at odds of 10/1 in a thirteen-runner field. After racing in mid-division Waldgeist made a strong run up the stands-side (the right hand side from the jockeys' viewpoint), took the lead 150 metres from the finish and won by a length from Best Solution with the favourite Capri half a length away in third. The unplaced horses included Prinz Hlodowig, Frankuus, Wings of Eagles and Rekindling. Boudot commented "He is still quite tender and has plenty to learn so we wanted to give him a good lesson last time. He still lacks a little strength but has a lot of quality and will make a good three-year-old. It is great to win the race for my boss and he is certainly a horse to watch out for next year".

In the official European Classification of two-year-olds for 2016 Waldgeist was given a rating of 114, making him the tenth best juvenile colt of the season, eight pounds behind the top-rated Churchill.

=== 2017: three-year-old season ===
Waldgeist began his second campaign by starting favourite for the Group 2 Prix Greffulhe over 2000 metres at Saint-Cloud Racecourse on 8 May and finished second of the five runners behind Recoletos. In the Prix du Jockey-Club at Chantilly four weeks later he produced a sustained late run to take the lead in the closing stages but was caught on the line and beaten a short head by the favourite Brametot. In the Irish Derby at the Curragh on 1 July he came home fourth behind Capri, Cracksman and Wings of Eagles, beaten less than two lengths by the winner.

After a three-month break, Waldgeist returned to the track on 7 October when he was sent to England for the Cumberland Lodge Stakes at Ascot Racecourse in which he was partnered by Vincent Cheminaud. Racing against older horses for the first time he was beaten a neck by the front-running four-year-old gelding Danehill Kodiac. He ended his season in Germany on 1 November when he ran fourth behind the five-year-old Guignol in the Grosser Preis von Bayern.

In the 2017 World's Best Racehorse Rankings, Waldgeist was given a rating of 117, making him the 129th best racehorse in the world.

=== 2018: four-year-old season ===
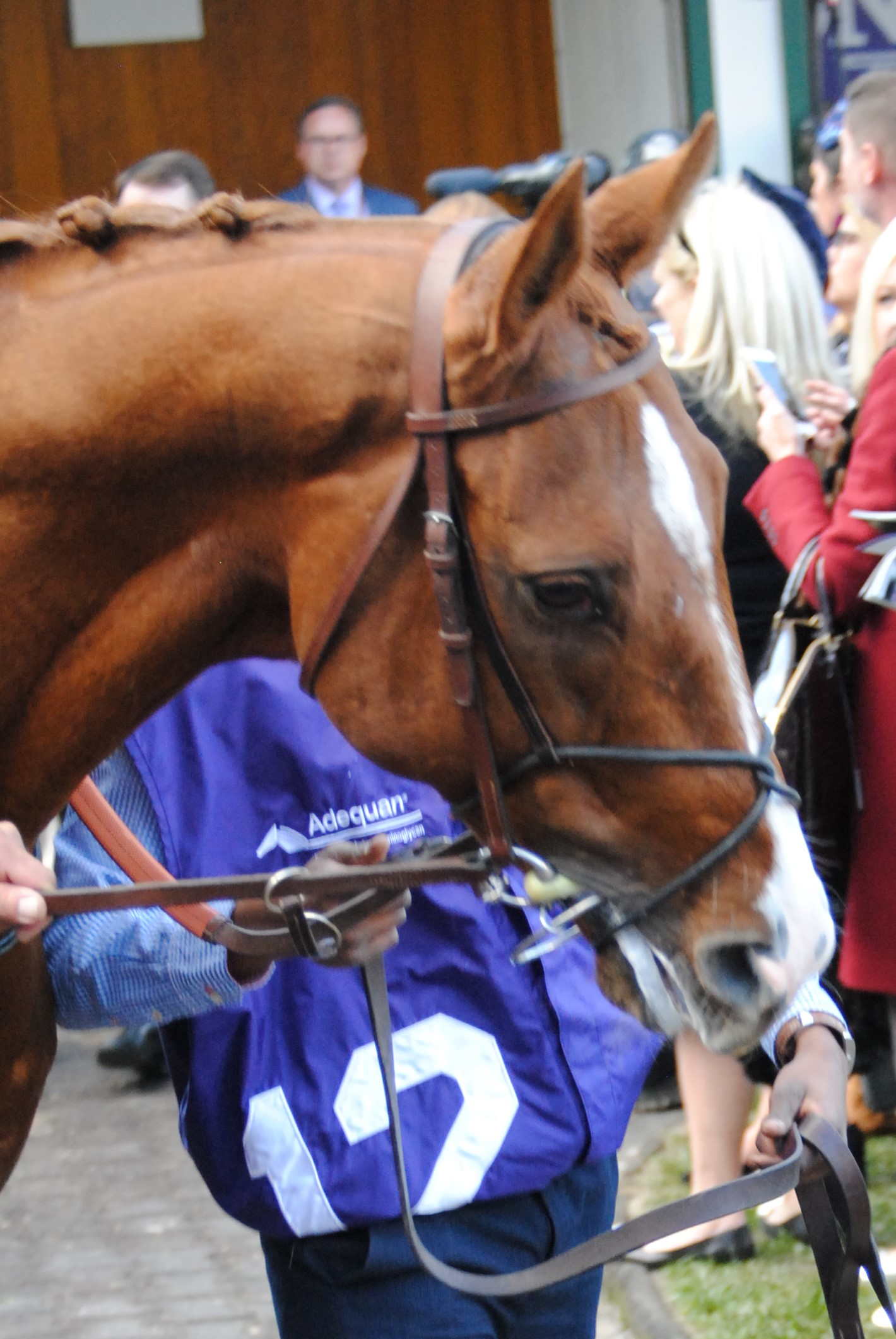
Waldgeist at the 2018 Breeders' Cup

On 8 April 2018 Waldgeist made a disappointing start to his third campaign when he came home fifth behind the nine-year-old British gelding Air Pilot in the Prix d'Harcourt over 2000 metres at Longchamp Racecourse. Four weeks later at the same track he was made the 2.6/1 favourite for the 2400 metre Prix d'Hédouville. He produced a strong late run on the outside to take the lead inside the last 100 metres and won by one and a half lengths and a had from Way To Paris and Called To The Bar. On 3 June the colt started second choice behind Cloth of Stars in the betting for the Grand Prix de Chantilly. He took the lead 200 metres from the finish and drew away to win "comfortably" by three lengths from the German challenger Dschingis Secret. The Group 1 Grand Prix de Saint-Cloud on 1 July saw Waldgeist start odds-on favourite against five opponents, namely Cloth of Stars, Coronet, Salouen (runner-up in the Coronation Cup), Iquitos (Grosser Preis von Baden) and Oriental Eagle (Gerling-Preis). After racing in third place he made a sustained run in the straight and got the better of a closely contested struggle with Coronet in the last 100 metres to win by a short head. After the race Gestut Ammerland's Dietrich von Boetticher said "It was a great performance and, although he has taken time to mature, he is stronger now as a four-year-old. He has proved himself since the start of the season and was given a great ride by Pierre-Charles Boudot today".

Following a break of two and a half months Waldgeist returned to the track for the Prix Foy (a major trial race for the Prix de l'Arc de Triomphe) at Longchamp on 15 September. Starting the 0.6/1 favourite he won in "impressive" style as he took the lead in the last 100 metres and pulled away to win by two and a half lengths from Talismanic. The four other beaten runners were Cloth of Stars, Way To Paris, Capri and the Japanese challenger Clincher. In the 2018 Prix de l'Arc de Triomphe on 7 October Waldgeist started at odds of 6/1, making him easily the best-fancied of the French-trained runners. After racing towards the rear of the field he made steady progress in the straight and came home fourth behind Enable, Sea of Class and Cloth of Stars. Four weeks later he was sent to the United States to contest the Breeders' Cup Turf at Churchill Downs for which he started second favourite but finished fifth of the thirteen runners. In December at Sha Tin Racecourse Waldgeist started favourite for the Hong Kong Vase but after being hampered in the straight he came home fifth, beaten four and a half lengths by the locally trained winner Exultant.

In the 2018 World's Best Racehorse Rankings, Waldgeist was given a rating of 122, making him the 20th best racehorse in the world.

=== 2019: five-year-old season ===
Waldgeist made his first appearance of 2019 in the Prix Ganay over 2100 at Longchamp on 28 April and started 3.4/1 second favourite behind Ghaiyyath (Prix d'Harcourt) in a five-runner field which also included Intellogent (Prix Jean Prat), Study of Man and Soleil Marin (Prix Exbury). He was settled in third place by Boudot before taking the lead 200 metres out and drawing away to win "readily" by four and a half lengths from Study of Man. Fabre commented "He's five now, and I can train him harder. He takes the work better. Remember, he was beaten a short head in the Prix du Jockey Club. He was unlucky and should have won that day, so he is competitive at this trip".

In June Waldgeist was sent to Royal Ascot for the Prince of Wales's Stakes over ten furlongs. In a race run in driving rain he finished third behind Crystal Ocean and Magical. In the following month he returned to Ascot for the King George VI and Queen Elizabeth Stakes. After racing in mid-division he stayed on strongly in the straight to finish third behind Enable and Crystal Ocean. As on 2018, Waldgeist prepared for the Arc de Triomphe in the Prix Foy and won again, coming home two lengths clear of his three opponents at odds of 2/5.

On 6 October Waldgeist started the 13.1/1 fifth choice behind Enable, Sottsass, Japan and Ghaiyyath in the 98th running of the Prix de l'Arc de Triomphe. Boudot settled Waldgeist in mid-division as Ghaiyyath set the pace from Fierement, Magical and Enable. Magical took the lead in the straight before giving way to Enable but Waldgeist produced a sustained run on the outside, caught the favourite 50 metres from the finish and drew away in the final strides to win by one and three quarter lengths.

In the 2019 World's Best Racehorse Rankings Waldgeist was given a rating of 128, placing him in a three-way tie for first place alongside Enable and Crystal Ocean.

== Stud career ==
Waldgeist began his career as a breeding stallion at the Ballylinch Stud in County Kilkenny, standing at an initial fee of €17,500.

== Pedigree ==
Pedigree of Waldgeist (GB), chestnut horse, 2014
Sire Galileo (IRE) 1998	Sadler's Wells (USA); 1981	Northern Dancer (CAN)	Nearctic
Sire Galileo (IRE) 1998	Sadler's Wells (USA); 1981	Northern Dancer (CAN)	Natalma (USA)
Sire Galileo (IRE) 1998	Sadler's Wells (USA); 1981	Fairy Bridge	Bold Reason
Sire Galileo (IRE) 1998	Sadler's Wells (USA); 1981	Fairy Bridge	Special
Sire Galileo (IRE) 1998	Urban Sea (USA); 1989	Miswaki	Mr. Prospector
Sire Galileo (IRE) 1998	Urban Sea (USA); 1989	Miswaki	Hopespringseternal
Sire Galileo (IRE) 1998	Urban Sea (USA); 1989	Allegretta (GB)	Lombard (GER)
Sire Galileo (IRE) 1998	Urban Sea (USA); 1989	Allegretta (GB)	Anatevka (GER)
Dam Waldlerche (GB) 2009	Monsun (GER); 1990	Königsstuhl	Dschingis Khan
Dam Waldlerche (GB) 2009	Monsun (GER); 1990	Königsstuhl	Konigskronung
Dam Waldlerche (GB) 2009	Monsun (GER); 1990	Mosella	Surumu
Dam Waldlerche (GB) 2009	Monsun (GER); 1990	Mosella	Monasia
Dam Waldlerche (GB) 2009	Waldmark (GER); 2000	Mark of Esteem (IRE)	Darshaan (GB)
Dam Waldlerche (GB) 2009	Waldmark (GER); 2000	Mark of Esteem (IRE)	Homage (GB)
Dam Waldlerche (GB) 2009	Waldmark (GER); 2000	Wurftaube	Acatenango
Dam Waldlerche (GB) 2009	Waldmark (GER); 2000	Wurftaube	Wurfbahn (Family 5-h)
