= Élie Lellouche =

French racehorse trainer

Élie Lellouche (born 5 March 1952 in Tunis) is a French trainer of Thoroughbred racehorses and jockeys.

After having modest success as a jockey, in 1979 Lellouche obtained his horse trainer's license. He had reasonable achievements and built a reputation good enough that in the 1990s the prominent Wildenstein Stables shifted forty-two of their horses from André Fabre to Lellouche's care. The move brought considerable success and raised his reputation even further that helped attract other owners to bring quality horses to his training facilities at Chantilly.

For Spanish owner/breeder Enrique Sarasola, Lellouche trained Helissio, the 1996 Prix de l'Arc de Triomphe winner. More recently, the Wildenstein Stable's colt, Westerner, became the first French-trained winner of Britain's Ascot Gold Cup in almost thirty years and was voted the Cartier Racing Award as Europe's Top Stayer in 2004 and 2005.

Lellouche is also known for coaching successful French jockey Dominique Boeuf.

== Major wins ==
France

- Critérium de Saint-Cloud - (3) - Pistolet Bleu (1990), Glaïeul (1991), Marchand de Sable (1992)
- Critérium International - (1) - Ectot (2013)
- Grand Critérium - (1) - Lost World (1993)
- Grand Prix de Saint-Cloud - (4) - Épervier Bleu (1991), Pistolet Bleu (1992), Helissio (1996, 1997)
- Poule d'Essai des Pouliches - (2) - Danseuse du Soir (1991), Beauty Parlour (2012)
- Prix de l'Arc de Triomphe - (1) - Helissio (1996)
- Prix d'Astarté - (2) - Shaanxi (1996), Bright Sky (2003)
- Prix du Cadran - (2) - Westerner (2003, 2004)
- Prix de Diane - (2) - Aquarelliste (2001), Bright Sky (2002)
- Prix de la Forêt - (2) - Danseuse du Soir (1991), Bigstone (1994)
- Prix Ganay - (4) - Vert Amande (1993), Helissio (1997), Aquarelliste (2002), Planteur (2011)
- Prix d'Ispahan - (1) - Bigstone (1994)
- Prix Lupin - (2) - Épervier Bleu (1990), Helissio (1996)
- Prix de l'Opéra - (2) - Verveine (1993), Bright Sky (2002)
- Prix Royal-Oak - (2) - Westerner (2003, 2004)
- Prix Vermeille - (1) - Aquarelliste (2001)

(United Kingdom) Great Britain

- Ascot Gold Cup - (1) - Westerner (2005)
- Coronation Stakes - (1) - Shake the Yoke (1996)
- Queen Elizabeth II Stakes - (1) - Bigstone (1993)
- Sussex Stakes - (1) - Bigstone (1993)

Hong Kong

- Hong Kong Vase - (2) - Partipral (1995), Vallée Enchantée (2003)

Italy

- Gran Premio di Milano - (1) - Sudan (2007)
