= Pierre-Charles Boudot =

French jockey

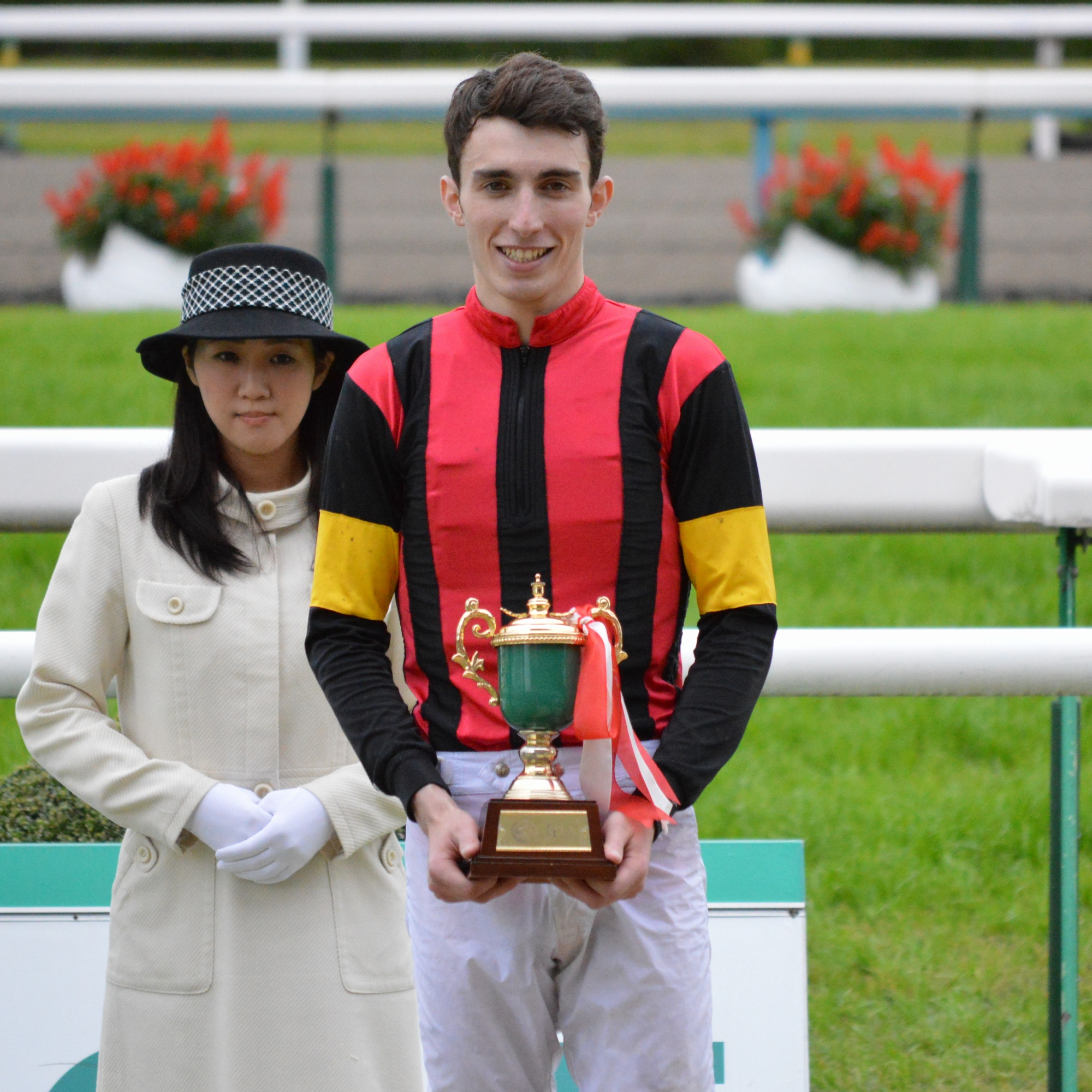
- at the Kyoto Racecourse in 2014

Personal information
- Born: 21 December 1992 (age 33) Paray-le-Monial, France
- Occupation: Jockey

Horse racing career
- Sport: Horse racing

Major racing wins
- Major race wins: Grand Prix de Paris (2014, 2020); Grand Prix de Saint-Cloud (2018, 2020); Coronation Stakes (2019); Prix de Diane (2019, 2020); Poule d'Essai des Poulains (2019); Prix de l'Arc de Triomphe (2019); Queen Elizabeth II Stakes (2020); Breeders' Cup Filly & Mare Turf (2020); Breeders' Cup Mile (2020)

Racing awards
- French flat racing Champion Jockey 3 times (2015, 2016, 2020)

Significant horses
- Waldgeist, Persian King, Order Of Australia (horse) The Revenant, Watch Me

Pierre-Charles Boudot (born 21 December 1992) is a French flat racing jockey.

He was French flat racing Champion Jockey in 2015, 2016 and 2020. Boudot rode Waldgeist to win Europe's biggest race the Prix de l'Arc de Triomphe in 2019.

In May 2021 Boudot has been suspended for three months by the France Galop as he is under investigation over rape allegation.

== Biography ==
A native of Paray-le-Monial in Saône-et-Loire, son of trainer Marc Boudot, Pierre-Charles Boudot trained at AFASEC, with André Fabre as his apprentice master. He won his first Group race in 2010 (with Brigantin in the Gr.3 Prix de Lutèce) and his first Group 1 in 2014 in the Grand Prix de Paris, riding Gallante.

In 2015, he won his first Cravache d'Or, then claimed the title the following year, reaching the 300-win mark (out of 1530 starters), beating Christophe Soumillon's French record (228 wins in 2013) and the European record held by Germany's Peter Schiergen (271 wins in 1995). On 21 March 2017 he celebrated his thousandth victory, but at the end of the year, he was dispossessed of his European record by rival Christophe Soumillon, who took it to 306. In 2019, he wins the Prix de l'Arc de Triomphe with his favorite horse Waldgeist.

== Major wins ==
France

- Prix de l'Arc de Triomphe – 1 – Waldgeist (2019)
- Poule d'Essai des Poulains – 1 – Persian King (2019)
- Prix de Diane – 2 – Channel (2019), Fancy Blue (2020)
- Prix de la Forêt – 3 – One Master (2018, 2019, 2020)
- Grand Prix de Saint-Cloud – 2 – Waldgeist (2018), Way To Paris (2020)
- Grand Prix de Paris – 2 – Gallante (2014), Mogul (2020)
- Prix Jacques Le Marois – 1 – Ésotérique (2015)
- Prix Rothschild – 2 – Ésotérique (2015), Watch Me (2020)
- Critérium de Saint–Cloud – 1 – Waldgeist (2016)
- Prix Jean–Luc Lagardère – 1 – National Defense (2016)
- Prix Vermeille – 1 – Bateel (2017)
- Prix Jean Prat – 1 – Intellogent (2018)
- Prix Marcel Boussac – 1 – Lily's Candle (2018)
- Prix Ganay – 2 – Waldgeist (2019), Mare Australis (2021)
- Prix Royal Oak – 1 – Technician (2019)
- Prix d'Ispahan – 1 – Persian King (2020)
- Prix du Moulin de Longchamp – 1 – Persian King (2020)
- Prix de l'Abbaye de Longchamp – 1 – Wooded (2020)
- Critérium International – 1 – Van Gogh (2020)

(United Kingdom) Great Britain

- Sun Chariot Stakes – 1 – Ésotérique (2015)
- Coronation Stakes – 1 – Watch Me (2019)
- Queen Elizabeth II Stakes – 1 – The Revenant (2020)

United States

- Breeders’ Cup Filly & Mare Turf – 1 – Audarya (2020)
- Breeders' Cup Mile – 1 – Order of Australia (2020)

== See also ==
- List of jockeys
