= Olivier Peslier =

French thoroughbred horse racing jockey (born 1973)

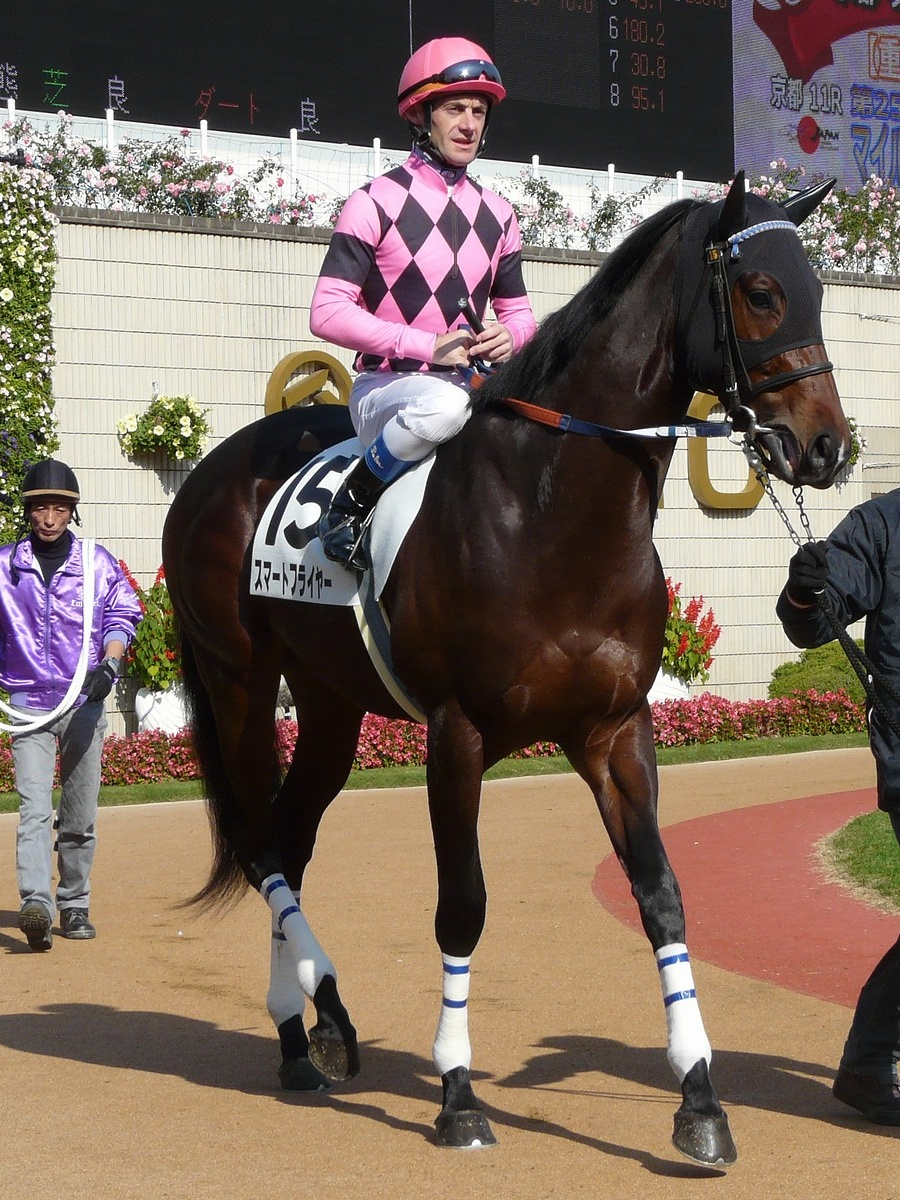

Personal information
- Nationality: French
- Born: January 12, 1973 (age 53) Château-Gontier, Mayenne
- Occupation: Jockey
- Height: 164 cm (5 ft 5 in)
- Weight: 55 kg (121 lb)

Horse racing career
- Sport: Horse racing

Olivier Peslier (born 12 January 1973 in Château-Gontier) is a French thoroughbred horse racing jockey.

Peslier competes in flat racing mainly in France but travels often around the world for the big international races. From 2003 to 2014, he was a retained jockey for the Wertheimer et Frère horse racing and breeding business partnership of brothers Alain and Gérard Wertheimer of France. In his free time, Peslier plays paintball, an unusual hobby for a jockey.

== Career wins in France ==
* = Champion Jockey

- 1991 – 46
- 1992 – 31
- 1993 – 91
- 1994 – 116
- 1995 – 132
- 1996 – 163 *
- 1997 – 157 *
- 1998 – 142
- 1999 – 147 *
- 2000 – 162 *
- 2001 – 148
- 2002 – 98
- 2003 – 109
- 2004 – 123
- 2005 – 99
- 2006 – 107
- 2007 – 94
- 2008 – 87
- 2009 – 92
- 2010 – 105
- 2011 – 91
- 2012 - 90

== Major wins ==
France

- Critérium de Saint-Cloud – (1) – Sagacity (2000)
- Grand Prix de Paris – (2) – Peintre Celebre (1997), Limpid (1998)
- Grand Prix de Saint-Cloud – (3) – Helissio (1996), Fragrant Mix (1998), Plumania (2010)
- Poule d'Essai des Poulains – (2) – Falco (2008), Make Believe (2015)
- Poule d'Essai des Pouliches – (4) – Torrestrella (2004), Golden Lilac (2011), Precieuse (2017), Teppal (2018)
- Prix de l'Arc de Triomphe – (4) – Helissio (1996), Peintre Celebre (1997), Sagamix (1998), Solemia (2012)
- Prix du Cadran – (2) – Molesnes (1994), Westerner (2004)
- Prix de la Forêt – (5) – Bigstone (1994), Poplar Bluff (1995), Etoile Montante (2003), Goldikova (2010), Make Believe (2015)
- Prix Ganay – (5) – Helissio (1997), Indian Danehill (2000), Fair Mix (2003), Cirrus des Aigles (2012), Pastorius (2013)
- Prix d'Ispahan – (6) – Bigstone (1994), Loup Sauvage (1998), Sageburg (2008), Goldikova (2010, 2011), Recoletos (2018)
- Prix Jacques Le Marois – (3) – Vahorimix (2001), Banks Hill (2002), Goldikova (2009)
- Prix Jean-Luc Lagardère – (2) – Lost World (1993), Loup Solitaire (1995)
- Prix Jean Prat – (5) – Le Balafre (1993), Turtle Bowl (2005), Lawman (2007), Charm Spirit (2014), Laws of Indices (2021)
- Prix du Jockey Club – (2) – Peintre Celebre (1997), Intello (2013)
- Prix Lupin – (2) – Cloudings (1997), Gracioso (1999)
- Prix Marcel Boussac – (3) – Miss Tahiti (1995), Lady of Chad (1999), Silasol (2012)
- Prix du Moulin de Longchamp – (3) – Desert Prince (1998), Goldikova (2008), Recoletos (2018)
- Prix de l'Opéra – (2) – Verveine (1993), Villa Marina (2019)
- Prix Rothschild – (6) – Shaanxi (1996), Goldikova (2008, 2009, 2010, 2011), Amazing Maria (2015)
- Prix Royal-Oak – (3) – Amilynx (1999, 2000), Montare (2006)
- Prix Saint-Alary – (4) – Muncie (1995), Brilliance (1997), Fidelite (2003), Silasol (2013)
- Prix de la Salamandre – (1) – Xaar (1997)
- Prix Vermeille – (3) – Queen Maud (1997), Galikova (2011), Teona (2021)

Canada

- E.P. Taylor Stakes – (1) – Kool Kat Katie (1997)

Germany

- Deutsches Derby – (2) – Borgia (1997), Dai Jin (2003)
- Preis von Europa - (1) - Scalo (2010)
- Rheinland-Pokal – (1) – Dai Jin (2003)
- Grosser Preis von Berlin - (1) - French King (2019)

Turkey

- Malazgirt Trophy
- Ifhar Trophy

(United Kingdom) Great Britain

- 2,000 Guineas – (1) – Cockney Rebel (2007)
- Ascot Gold Cup – (1) – Westerner (2005)
- Coronation Stakes – (2) – Shake the Yoke (1996), Banks Hill (2001)
- Derby – (1) – High-Rise (1998)
- Dewhurst Stakes – (1) – Xaar (1997)
- Falmouth Stakes – (1) – Goldikova (2009)
- King George VI and Queen Elizabeth Stakes – (1) – Harbinger (2010)
- King's Stand Stakes – (2) – Don't Worry Me (1997), Equiano (2008)
- Lockinge Stakes – (1) – Keltos (2002)
- Prince of Wales's Stakes – (2) – Ouija Board (2006), Vision d'Etat (2009)
- Queen Anne Stakes – (1) – Goldikova (2010)
- Queen Elizabeth II Stakes – (3) – Air Express (1997), Desert Prince (1998), Charm Spirit (2014)
- Hardwicke Stakes -(1) - Dartmouth (2016)

Spain

- Premio Copa
- Premio Duc De Toledo Memorial

(Emirate of Sharjah) Sharjah

- Rayyan Cup

Hong Kong

- Hong Kong Cup – (1) – Vision d'Etat (2009)
- Hong Kong Mile – (2) – Docksider (1999), Hat Trick (2005)
- Hong Kong Vase – (4) – Partipral (1995), Borgia (1999), Doctor Dino (2007, 2008)

United States

- Breeders' Cup Filly & Mare Turf – (1) – Banks Hill (2001)
- Breeders' Cup Mile – (3) – Goldikova (2008, 2009, 2010)
- Man o' War Stakes – (1) – Doctor Dino (2007)

(Emirate of Abu Dhabi) Abu Dhabi

- The President Of The UAE Cup

Saudi Arabia

- King's Cup
- Custodian of the Holy Two Mosques
- Crown Prince Cup
- King Abdulaziz Cup

Mauritius

- The Air Mauritius Pailles
- Le Grand Prix De France
- The Long Beach Cup

(Republic of Ireland) Ireland

- Irish 2,000 Guineas – (3) – Desert Prince (1998), Saffron Walden (1999), Cockney Rebel (2007)
- Irish Derby – (1) – Winged Love (1995)
- Irish St Leger – (1) – Sans Frontières (2010)

Italy

- Gran Criterium – (2) – Glory of Dancer (1995), Hearts of Fire (2009)

Japan

- Arima Kinen – (3) – Symboli Kris S (2002, 2003), Zenno Rob Roy (2004)
- February Stakes - (2) - Wing Arrow (2000), Nobo True (2001)
- Hanshin Juvenile Fillies - (1) - Tamuro Cherry (2001)
- Japan Cup – (2) – Jungle Pocket (2001), Zenno Rob Roy (2004)
- Mile Championship – (2) – Zenno El Cid (2001), Hat Trick (2005)
- Tenno Sho (Autumn) – (2) – Symboli Kris S (2003), Zenno Rob Roy (2004)

Switzerland

- Swiss Derby

United Arab Emirates

- Dubai Kahayla Classic - (2) - Magic De Piboule (2001), Seraphin Du Paon (2011)
- Dubai Sheema Classic - (1) - Cirrus des Aigles (2012)
- Godolphin Mile - (1) - Tereshkova (1996)
- Al Maktoum Round Challenge III
- Al Maktoum Round Challenge Arab III

(Emirate of Dubai) Dubai

- Jebel Ali Sprint
- Jebel Ali Mile

Qatar

- H H The Emir Trophy
- H H The Emir sword
- The Heir Apparent Trophy
- The Heir Apparent Sword
- Qatar International Derby
- Qatar International Cup
- Qatar International Trophy
- Khor Al alaide Cup

=== Year-end charts ===
Chart (2001–present)	Peak position
National Earnings List for Jockeys 2001	91
National Earnings List for Jockeys 2012	74
