= Christophe Soumillon =

Belgian jockey

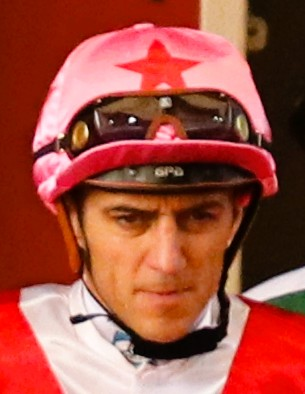
- Soumillon in 2025

Personal information
- Born: 4 June 1981 (age 45) Schaerbeek, Brussels, Belgium
- Occupation: Jockey

Horse racing career
- Sport: Horse racing
- Career wins: 4,000+

Major racing wins
- French Classic Race wins: Grand Prix de Saint-Cloud (2001, 2017); Prix du Jockey Club (2001, 2003, 2006, 2022); Grand Prix de Paris (2002, 2006, 2008, 2017); Prix de l'Arc de Triomphe (2003, 2008); Prix de Diane (2004, 2008, 2025); Poule d'Essai des Pouliches (2003, 2007, 2008, 2012, 2015); Poule d'Essai des Poulains (2001, 2003, 2009); Prix Royal-Oak (2015, 2016) International race wins: Dubai Duty Free Stakes (2002); UAE Derby (2010, 2015, 2017); Dubai Gold Cup (2016, 2017, 2018); Pretty Polly Stakes (Ireland) (2003); Racing Post Trophy (2003); Breeders' Cup Turf (2005); Hong Kong Gold Cup (2005); Irish Oaks (2005); Queen Anne Stakes (2005); Middle Park Stakes (2021); Prix Maurice de Gheest (2003, 2005); Prix Morny (2006, 2021); Prix de l'Opéra (2001, 2006, 2013, 2020); Prix Vermeille (2002, 2005, 2006, 2008, 2020); Prix Jacques Le Marois (2004, 2010, 2012, 2025); Grande Course de Haies d'Auteuil (2010); Stewards' Cup (2005, 2009, 2016); Chairman's Sprint Prize (2006); Coronation Cup (2006, 2014); Gran Premio di Milano (2006); Hong Kong Derby (2006); Hong Kong Gold Cup (2005); King George VI and Queen Elizabeth Stakes (2006, 2024); Oaks d'Italia (2006); Queen's Silver Jubilee Cup (2006); Hong Kong Mile (2008, 2019); Tenno Sho (Autumn) (2010); Champion Stakes (2011, 2016); Jebel Hatta (2014, 2019); Deutsches Derby (2014); Japan Cup (2014); Dubai Sheema Classic (2015); Dubai Turf (2002); Irish Champion Stakes (2016, 2025); Dubai World Cup (2018, 2019); Queen Elizabeth II Commemorative Cup (2019); Coronation Stakes (2015); Al Quoz Sprint (2013)

Racing awards
- French flat racing Champion Jockey (2003, 2005, 2006, 2011, 2012, 2013, 2014, 2015, 2017, 2018)

Significant horses
- Dalakhani, Rail Link, Mandesha, Shirocco, Viva Pataca, Hurricane Run, Overdose, Good Ba Ba, Zarkava
- Updated on 9 May 2007

Christophe Soumillon (born 4 June 1981) is a Belgian jockey based in France.

== Career ==
Coming from a racing background, Soumillon is the son of jump jockey Jean-Marc Soumillon. He rode in pony races and left Belgium aged fifteen to go to the racing school in Chantilly, France, where he was then apprenticed to trainer Cédric Boutin.

Soumillon rode his first Group race winner aged eighteen when Berine's Son, trained by André Fabre, won the 2000 Prix de Fontainebleau. The following season he won four Group 1 races, including the Prix du Jockey Club on Anabaa. In 2002 he was appointed first jockey in France to the Aga Khan's racing operation, a position he held until 2009 and then again from 2014 to 2022. The partnership was successful in the 2003 Prix de l'Arc de Triomphe with Dalakhani and won the same race with the unbeaten filly Zarkava. In 2009 Soumillon lost his position, but the partnership resumed in 2014 and the following year they were successful at Royal Ascot when Ervedya won the Coronation Stakes.

Soumillon won the cravache d'or (the golden whip or French champion jockey title) for the first time in 2003 and won his tenth title in 2018.

Although primarily known as a flat jockey, Soumillon has also ridden over hurdles, winning the 2010 Grande Course de Haies d'Auteuil (French Champion Hurdle) on Mandali.

In March 2020, he surpassed Yves Saint-Martin by riding his 3,315th winner in France. This milestone cemented his status at the top of the all-time leaderboard for wins in France.

On 30 September 2022 Soumillon was given a 60 day ban for elbowing Rossa Ryan off his horse during the Prix Thomas Bryon at Saint-Cloud. He also lost his position as retained rider to the Aga Khan over the incident. The Police des Jeux (the Gaming unit of the Central Directorate of the Judicial Police) considered extending Soumillon's ban but decided against it.

In July 2024, Soumillon won the King George VI and Queen Elizabeth Stakes at Ascot on 25/1 chance Goliath, trained by Francis-Henry Gaffard. After the race he said that he dreamt of winning the Epsom Derby and invited trainers to offer him a ride in the race. Trainer Charlie Johnstom offered him a ride in the 2025 Derby on Lazy Griff, a syndicate-owned horse who started at odds of 50/1 and had been 100/1 at one time. Soumillon had already ridden him to win the Group 3 Prix de Condé at Chantilly the previous autumn. Lazy Griff defied his odds to achieve second place behind Lambourn in the Derby.

== Personal life ==
Soumillon married TV presenter and former beauty queen Sophie Thalmann on 22 July 2006. The couple have three children, daughter Charlie (born September 2005), son Mika (born November 2008) and son Robin (born April 2017).

Having been involved with pony racing for several years, Soumillon founded the Soumillon International Pony Academy in Deauville in 2023.

== Major wins ==
France

- Critérium International - (5) - Dalakhani (2002), Carlotamix (2005), Thunder Snow (2016), Royal Meeting (2018), Puerto Rico (2025)
- Critérium de Saint-Cloud - (4) - Linda's Lad (2005), Prince Gibraltar (2013), Los Angeles (2023), Pierre Bonnard (2025)
- Grande Course de Haies d'Auteuil - (1) - Mandali (2010)
- Grand Prix de Paris - (4) - Khalkevi (2002), Rail Link (2006), Montmartre (2008), Shakeel (2017)
- Grand Prix de Saint-Cloud - (2) - Mirio (2001), Zarak (2017)
- Poule d'Essai des Poulains - (3) - Vahorimix (2001), Clodovil (2003), Silver Frost (2009)
- Poule d'Essai des Pouliches - (5) - Musical Chimes (2003), Darjina (2007), Zarkava (2008), Beauty Parlour (2012), Ervedya (2015)
- Prix Cambacérès - (1) - Hippomene (2013)
- Prix de l'Arc de Triomphe - (2) - Dalakhani (2003), Zarkava (2008)
- Prix d'Astarté - (2) - Turtle Bow (2002), Mandesha (2006)
- Prix du Cadran - (3) - Reefscape (2005), Bannaby (2008), Vazirabad (2017)
- Prix de Diane - (3) - Latice (2004), Zarkava (2008), Gezora (2025)
- Prix de la Forêt - (1) - Paco Boy (2008)
- Prix de Royallieu - (1) - Grateful (2024)
- Prix Ganay - (5) - Dylan Thomas (2007), Planteur (2011), Cirrus des Aigles (2014, 2015), Dariyan (2016)
- Prix d'Ispahan - (2) - Valixir (2005), Cirrus des Aigles (2014)
- Prix Jacques Le Marois - (4) - Whipper (2004), Makfi (2010), Excelebration (2012), Diego Velazquez (2025)
- Prix Jean Prat - (3) - Thunder Snow (2017), Woodshauna (2025), Thesecretadversary (2026)
- Prix Jean-Luc Lagardère - (2) - Camille Pissarro (2024), Puerto Rico (2025)
- Prix Jean Romanet - (2) - Stacelita (2010), Quisisana (2025)
- Prix du Jockey Club - (4) - Anabaa Blue (2001), Dalakhani (2003), Darsi (2006), Vadeni (2022)
- Prix Lupin - (1) - Dalakhani (2003)
- Prix Marcel Boussac - (4) - Zarkava (2007), Rosanara (2009), Diamond Necklace (2025), Green Empress (2026)
- Prix Maurice de Gheest - (2) - Porlezza (2003), Whipper (2005)
- Prix Morny - (2) - Dutch Art (2006), Perfect Power (2021)
- Prix du Moulin de Longchamp - (2) - Darjina (2007), Ervedya (2015)
- Prix de l'Opéra - (5) - Terre à Terre (2001), Mandesha (2006), Dalkala (2013), Tarnawa (2020), Miss Scott (2026)
- Prix Royal-Oak - (2) - Vazirabad (2015, 2016)
- Prix Saint-Alary - (4) - Vadawina (2005), Vazira (2014), Incarville (2021), Jannah Rose (2023)
- Prix Vermeille - (5) - Pearly Shells (2002), Shawanda (2005), Mandesha (2006), Zarkava (2008), Tarnawa (2020)

Canada

- Canadian International - (1) - Sarah Lynx (2011)
- E.P. Taylor Stakes - (1) Reggane (2010)

Germany

- Deutsches Derby - (1) - Sea The Moon (2014)
- Grosser Preis von Baden - (1) - Zagrey (2023)
- Preis von Europa - (1) - Goliath (2026)

(United Kingdom) Great Britain

- Champion Stakes - (2) - Cirrus des Aigles (2011), Almanzor (2016)
- Commonwealth Cup - (1) - Perfect Power (2022)
- Coronation Cup - (2) - Shirocco (2006), Cirrus de Aigles (2014)
- Coronation Stakes - (1) - Ervedya (2015)
- Eclipse Stakes - (1) - Vadeni (2022)
- Falmouth Stakes - (1) - Giofra (2012)
- Fillies' Mile - (1) - Precise (2025)
- King George VI and Queen Elizabeth Stakes - (2) - Hurricane Run (2006), Goliath (2024)
- Queen Anne Stakes - (1) - Valixir (2005)
- Racing Post Trophy - (1) - American Post (2003)
- Sun Chariot Stakes - (1) - Sahpresa (2010)
- Middle Park Stakes - (1) - Perfect Power (2021)

Hong Kong

- Chairman's Sprint Prize - (2) - Billet Express (2006), Gold Fun (2015)
- Hong Kong Classic Mile - (2) - Thumbs Up (2009), Beauty Flash (2010)
- Hong Kong Derby - (1) - Viva Pataca (2006)
- Hong Kong Gold Cup - (1) - Perfect Partner (2005)
- Hong Kong Mile - (2) - Good Ba Ba (2008), Admire Mars (2019)
- Queen's Silver Jubilee Cup - (1) - Joyful Winner (2006)
- Stewards' Cup - (3) - Bullish Luck (2005), Good Ba Ba (2009), Giant Treasure (2016)

Hungary

- OTP Hungária Grand Prix - (1) - Overdose (2009)

(Republic of Ireland) Ireland

- Irish Champion Stakes - (2) - Almanzor (2016), Delacroix (2025)
- Irish Oaks - (1) - Shawanda (2005)
- Pretty Polly Stakes - (1) - Hanami (2003)

Italy

- Gran Premio di Milano - (1) - Shamdala (2006)
- Oaks d'Italia - (1) - Dionisia (2006)
- Premio Vittorio di Capua - (1) - Dick Turpin (2011)

Japan

- Japan Cup - (1) - Epiphaneia (2014)
- Queen Elizabeth II Commemorative Cup - (1) - Lucky Lilac (2019)
- Tenno Sho (Autumn) - (1) - Buena Vista (2010)

United Arab Emirates

- Al Quoz Sprint - (1) - Shea Shea (2013)
- Dubai Duty Free Stakes - (1) - Terre à Terre (2002)
- Dubai Sheema Classic - (1) - Dolniya (2015)
- Jebel Hatta - (2) - Vercingetorix (2014), Dream Castle (2019)
- UAE Derby - (2) - Musir (2010), Mubtaahij (2015), Thunder Snow (2017)
- Dubai World Cup - (2) - Thunder Snow (2018, 2019)

United States

- Breeders' Cup Juvenile Turf - (1) - Gstaad (2025)
- Breeders' Cup Turf - (1) - Shirocco (2005)
