= Enrique Sarasola =

Spanish businessman

Enrique Sarasola Lerchundi (24 August 1937 – 2 November 2002) was a Spanish industrialist, a major figure in his country's transition to democracy, and an owner and breeder of Thoroughbred racehorses.

A native of San Sebastián, Spain, at age twenty, Sarasola emigrated to Colombia as an auditor with Price Waterhouse. He married Cecilia Marulanda, from a wealthy family, and eventually went into business for himself. Highly successful, in 1970 he returned to his native Spain where he became active in politics. Working behind the scenes where political opposition was suppressed by the government of General Franco, Sarasola used his wealth to help the then illegal Spanish Socialist Workers' Party (PSOE) headed by Felipe González. After Gonzalez was elected Prime Minister of the Spanish government in 1982, Enrique Sarasola became a powerful figure during Gonzalez' fourteen years in office. However, he would come under much criticism and be involved in court battles over charges of patronage and political corruption.

Enrique Sarasola owned a number of successful racehorses, the best known of which was Helissio, winner of the 1996 Prix de l'Arc de Triomphe and European Horse of the Year. From 1992 until its closure in 1996, Sarasola was the owner of Hipodromo de la Zarzuela race track, just west of Madrid.

After a long illness, Enrique Sarasola died at age 65 in 2002 in a Madrid hospital and was interred in the La Paz-Alcobendas cemetery in Madrid. His son, Enrique Sarasola Jr., is a world class equestrian competitor who has represented Spain in the 1998 Eventing World Championship and the 2000 Summer Olympics.
