= 1980 Prix de l'Arc de Triomphe =

- Location: Longchamp Racecourse
- Date: October 5, 1980

The 1980 Prix de l'Arc de Triomphe was a horse race held at Longchamp on Sunday 5 October 1980. It was the 59th running of the Prix de l'Arc de Triomphe.

The winner was Detroit, a three-year-old filly trained in France by Oliver Douieb. The winning jockey was Pat Eddery who was winning the race for the first time. The filly won by half a length and a short head from Argument and Ela-Mana-Mou.

The winning time of 2m 28.0s was a new record for the race.

== Race details ==
- Sponsor: none
- Purse:
- Going: Firm
- Distance: 2,400 metres
- Number of runners: 20
- Winner's time: 2m 28.0s

== Full result ==
Pos.	Marg.	Horse	Age	Jockey	Trainer (Country)
1		Detroit	3	Pat Eddery	Olivier Douieb (FR)
2	½	Argument	3	Jean-Claude Desaint	John Cunnington Jr. (FR)
3	shd	Ela-Mana-Mou	4	Willie Carson	Dick Hern (GB)
4	nk	Three Troikas	4	Freddy Head	Criquette Head (FR)
5	1	Nebos	4	Lutz Mäder	Hein Bollow (GER)
6	2	Nicholas Bill	5	Philip Waldron	Henry Candy (GB)
7	snk	Dunette	3	Georges Doleuze	E. Chevalier du Fau (FR)
8	½	Le Marmot	4	Philippe Paquet	François Boutin (FR)
9	¾	Ruscelli	3	Maurice Philipperon	Freddie Palmer (FR)
10	2	Satilla	3	A Perrotta	J Gobel (FR)
11	3	Little Bonny	3	Christy Roche	Kevin Prendergast (IRE)
12	hd	Moulouki	3	Alfred Gibert	Mitri Saliba (FR)
13	½	Niniski	4	Joe Mercer	Dick Hern (GB)
14	shd	Providential	3	Alain Lequeux	Olivier Douieb (FR)
15	½	Mrs Penny	3	John Matthias	Ian Balding (GB)
16	shd	Policeman	3	Gerard Dubroeucq	Charlie Milbank (FR)
17	5	Noble Saint	4	Greville Starkey	Robert Armstrong (GB)
18	4	Glenorum	3	Lester Piggott	David Smaga (FR)
19		Lindoro	4	M Thomas	Dick Hern (GB)
20		Iades	5	J Heloury	(FR)

* Abbreviations: shd = short-head; nk = neck

== Winner's details ==
Further details of the winner, Detroit.

- Sex: Filly
- Foaled: 24 February 1977
- Country: France
- Sire: Riverman; Dam: Derna (Sunny Boy)
- Owner: Robert Sangster
- Breeder: Societe Åland
