= Shakapour =

Irish-bred Thoroughbred racehorse

- Sire: Kalamoun
- Grandsire: Zeddaan
- Dam: Shamim
- Damsire: Le Haar
- Sex: Stallion
- Foaled: 2 April 1977
- Country: Ireland
- Colour: Grey
- Breeder: Aga Khan IV
- Owner: Aga Khan IV
- Trainer: François Mathet
- Record: 7: 3-2-1

Major wins
- Prix de Guiche (1980); Grand Prix de Saint-Cloud (1980)

Awards
- Timeform rating 105 (1979), 125 (1980)

Shakapour (2 April 1977–after 1994) was an Irish-bred, French-trained Thoroughbred racehorse and sire. He showed promise as a two-year-old in 1979 when he won the last of his three races. In the following year he won the Prix de Guiche and finished second in the Prix du Jockey Club before recording his biggest success when dead-heating for the Grand Prix de Saint-Cloud. His career was ended by injury shortly afterwards and he was retired to stud where he made little impact as a sire of winners.

== Background ==
Shakapour was a grey horse with a broad white blaze and four white socks bred in Ireland by his owner Aga Khan IV. He was sired by Kalamoun who won the Poule d'Essai des Poulains, Prix Lupin and the Prix Jacques Le Marois in 1973 before becoming a successful breeding stallion. The best of his other runners were probably Kalaglow (King George VI and Queen Elizabeth Stakes) and Bikala (Prix du Jockey Club). Shakapour's dam Shamim, who won one minor race as a two-year-old, went on to produce Shademah, the dam of The Derby winner Shahrastani.

Shakapour was trained by the veteran François Mathet at Chantilly. Mathet had trained many of the best French racehorses of the 20th century including Tantieme, Relko and Reliance.

== Racing career ==
=== 1979: two-year-old season ===
Shakapour ran three times as a two-year-old in 1979. He finished third in the Prix de l'Yser over 1400 metres on his debut and then ran second in the Prix Mieuxce over 1600m. On his final appearance of the season he contested a maiden race over 1400m at Saint-Cloud Racecourse and won by a length from Rolling Star. In their annual Racehorses of 1979, the independent Timeform organisation said the colt had made a "favourable impression" and would stay "at least 1¼ miles".

=== 1980: three-year-old season ===
Shakapour began his second season in the Group Three Prix de Guiche over 1950m at Longchamp Racecourse on 20 April. Ridden by Yves Saint-Martin he started at odds of 3.7/1 and won by two lengths and a neck from Corvaro and Policeman. On 11 May the colt was moved up in class and distance for the Group Two Prix Hocquart over 2400m at the same course and finished fourth behind Mot d'Or, Providential and Belgio, beaten just over two lengths by the winner.

On 8 June, Shakapour started at odds of 6/1 for the Prix du Jockey Club over 2400m at Chantilly Racecourse. Ridden as usual by Saint-Martin he moved into second place in the straight but was unable to make further progress and was beaten one and a half lengths by the 54/1 outsider Policeman. The beaten horses included Providential, Mot d'Or, Belgio, Argument and Dragon. Shakapour was then matched against older horses in the Grand Prix de Saint-Cloud over 2500m on 6 July and started the 3/1 second favourite behind the four-year-old colt Scorpio, the winner of the Hardwicke Stakes. Shakapour, racing alongside the 1979 Pix de Diane winner Dunette, moved past Policeman to dispute the lead inside the final 200m. In the closing stages the colt and the filly moved clear of the field and crossed the line together in a race described by Timeform as "a fine spectacle". The judge declared a dead heat with the supporters of both horses having grounds to consider themselves unlucky: Saint-Martin had dropped his whip 200m from the finish, while George Doleuze on Dunette appeared guilty of premature celebration, raising his arm in triumph a stride before the line. Lancastrian finished third ahead of Policeman and Noble Saint.

Shakapour was then aimed at the Prix de l'Arc de Triomphe but was retired from racing following an injury.

== Assessment ==
In 1979, Shakapour was rated 105 by Timeform, placing him twenty-four pounds below their top-rated two-year-old Monteverdi. In the following year he was rated 125 by Timeform, twelve pounds behind their Horse of the Year Moorestyle. In the official International Classification he was rated the fifth-best three-year-old in Europe behind Moorestyle, Argument, Known Fact and Nureyev, and was the joint-tenth best racehorse of any age.

== Stud record ==
Shakapour was retired to become a breeding stallion in Europe before being exported to Japan where his last reported foals were born in 1992. The best of his offspring was the filly Khariyda who won the E. P. Taylor Stakes, Premio Lydia Tesio and Prix Fille de l'Air for the Aga Khan in 1987. He was "put out of stud" in Japan on 1 August 1994.

== Pedigree ==
Pedigree of Shakapour (IRE), grey stallion, 1977
Sire Kalamoun (GB) 1970	Zeddaan (GB); 1965	Grey Sovereign	Nasrullah
Sire Kalamoun (GB) 1970	Zeddaan (GB); 1965	Grey Sovereign	Kong
Sire Kalamoun (GB) 1970	Zeddaan (GB); 1965	Vareta	Vilmorin
Sire Kalamoun (GB) 1970	Zeddaan (GB); 1965	Vareta	Veronique
Sire Kalamoun (GB) 1970	Khairunissa (GB); 1969	Prince Bio	Prince Rose
Sire Kalamoun (GB) 1970	Khairunissa (GB); 1969	Prince Bio	Biologie
Sire Kalamoun (GB) 1970	Khairunissa (GB); 1969	Palariva	Palestine
Sire Kalamoun (GB) 1970	Khairunissa (GB); 1969	Palariva	Rivaz
Dam Shamim (IRE) 1968	Le Haar (FR); 1954	Vieux Manoir	Brantôme
Dam Shamim (IRE) 1968	Le Haar (FR); 1954	Vieux Manoir	Vieille Maison
Dam Shamim (IRE) 1968	Le Haar (FR); 1954	Mince Pie	Teleferique
Dam Shamim (IRE) 1968	Le Haar (FR); 1954	Mince Pie	Cannelle
Dam Shamim (IRE) 1968	Diamond Drop (GB); 1963	Charlottesville	Prince Chevalier
Dam Shamim (IRE) 1968	Diamond Drop (GB); 1963	Charlottesville	Noorani
Dam Shamim (IRE) 1968	Diamond Drop (GB); 1963	Martine	Palestine
Dam Shamim (IRE) 1968	Diamond Drop (GB); 1963	Martine	Pale Ale (family: 3-o)
