= Pearl Cap =

French-bred Thoroughbred racehorse

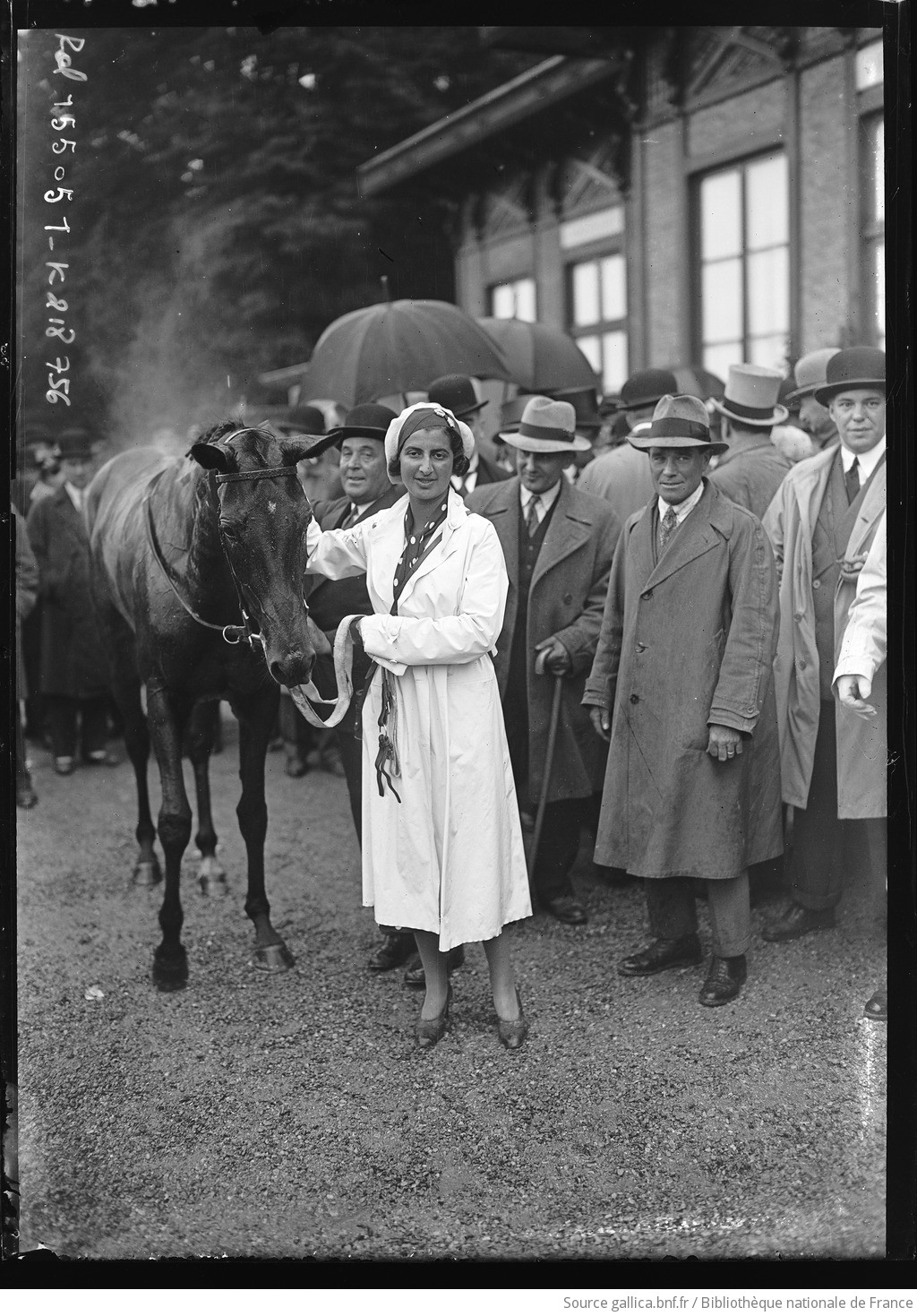
- Pearl Cap and owner Mlle Esmond
- Sire: Le Capucin
- Grandsire: Nimbus
- Dam: Pearl Maiden
- Damsire: Phaleron
- Sex: Filly
- Foaled: 1928
- Country: France
- Colour: Bay
- Breeder: Edward Esmond
- Owner: Mlle Diana Esmond
- Trainer: Frank Carter
- Record: Not found
- Earnings: Not found

Major wins
- Prix Herod (1930); Prix Robert Papin (1930); Prix Morny (1930); Prix La Rochette (1930); Poule d'Essai des Pouliches (1931); Prix de Diane (1931); Prix de Minerve (1931); Prix Jacques Le Marois (1931); Prix Vermeille (1931); Prix de l'Arc de Triomphe (1931)

Honours
- Prix Pearl Cap at Saint-Cloud Racecourse
- Last updated on June 1, 2007

Pearl Cap (foaled 1928) was a French champion Thoroughbred racehorse who is considered one of her country's greatest racing fillies.

== Background ==
Owned and bred by the Esmond family, she was raced under the name of Miss Diana Esmond. She was trained by Frank Carter, a member of the prominent racing family that began in France with Thomas Carter (1805-1879), who immigrated from Peckleton, Leicestershire in England in 1831 and founded the English Racing Colony in Chantilly, Oise.

Pearl Cap is described by France Galop as being "light-framed" and "lop-eared." On the race track, she won races from 1100 metres to 2400 metres. (0.68 to 1.5 miles).

== Racing career ==
Racing at age two in 1930, Pearl Cap won five races, including victories over colts in the Prix Robert Papin as well as in the prestigious (now Group One), Prix Morny. Her performances that year earned her France's champion two-year-old filly honors. In her three-year-old season, the filly again beat her male counterparts in major races. She finished second to Prince Rose in the Grand International d'Ostende at Hippodrome Wellington in Ostend, Belgium, a race her sire Le Capucin won in 1924. After winning three Group One (today) races in France, including the Prix de Diane, in October Pearl Cap defeated Prince Rose at Longchamp Racecourse in Paris when she became the first filly to ever win the Prix de l'Arc de Triomphe.

== Breeding record ==
Retired to broodmare duties, Pearl Cap was a disappointment as a broodmare until the age of sixteen, when she produced the 1947 Epsom Derby winner, Pearl Diver.

== Pedigree ==
Pedigree of Pearl Cap, bay mare, foaled 1928
Sire Le Capucin b. 1920	Nimbus b. 1910	Elf ch. 1893	Upas
Sire Le Capucin b. 1920	Nimbus b. 1910	Elf ch. 1893	Analogy
Sire Le Capucin b. 1920	Nimbus b. 1910	Nephte ch. 1903	Flying Fox
Sire Le Capucin b. 1920	Nimbus b. 1910	Nephte ch. 1903	Fanny
Sire Le Capucin b. 1920	Carmen b/br. 1905	Sidus br. 1897	St. Simon
Sire Le Capucin b. 1920	Carmen b/br. 1905	Sidus br. 1897	Star Of Fortune
Sire Le Capucin b. 1920	Carmen b/br. 1905	La Figlia b. 1897	Saraband
Sire Le Capucin b. 1920	Carmen b/br. 1905	La Figlia b. 1897	Vivandiere
Dam Pearl Maiden br. 1918	Phaleron b. 1906	Gallinule ch. 1884	Isonomy
Dam Pearl Maiden br. 1918	Phaleron b. 1906	Gallinule ch. 1884	Moorhen
Dam Pearl Maiden br. 1918	Phaleron b. 1906	Mrs Butterwick b. 1890	St. Simon
Dam Pearl Maiden br. 1918	Phaleron b. 1906	Mrs Butterwick b. 1890	Miss Middleton
Dam Pearl Maiden br. 1918	Seashell ch. 1908	Orme b. 1889	Ormonde
Dam Pearl Maiden br. 1918	Seashell ch. 1908	Orme b. 1889	Angelica
Dam Pearl Maiden br. 1918	Seashell ch. 1908	Rydal Fell b. 1903	Ladas
Dam Pearl Maiden br. 1918	Seashell ch. 1908	Rydal Fell b. 1903	Rydal (Family 16-b)

Pearl Cap was inbred 4 × 4 to St. Simon, meaning that St. Simon appears twice in the fourth generation of her pedigree.
