= Skalleti =

French Thoroughbred racehorse

- Sire: Kendargent
- Grandsire: Kendor
- Dam: Skallet
- Damsire: Muhaymin
- Sex: Gelding
- Foaled: 25 February 2015
- Country: France
- Colour: Grey
- Breeder: Guy Pariente Holding
- Owner: Jean-Claude Seroul
- Trainer: Jerome Reynier
- Record: 30: 20-2-3
- Earnings: £1,208,996

Major wins
- Prix Jacques de Bremond (2019); Prix Quincey (2019); Prix Dollar (2019, 2020); Premio Roma (2019, 2021); Prix Gontaut-Biron (2020); Prix Exbury (2021); Prix d'Harcourt (2021,2022); Prix d'Ispahan (2021); Bayerisches Zuchtrennen (2021); Premio Presidente della Repubblica (2023)

Skalleti (foaled 25 February 2015) is a French Thoroughbred racehorse. He is a gelding who shows his best form on soft ground and usually races over distances from 1600 metres to 2000 metres. He has raced in France, England, Italy, Germany and Hong Kong.

He did not race until the autumn of his three-year-old season when he won two minor races on provincial tracks. As a four-year-old in 2019 he made steady improvement, winning eight races including the Prix Quincey, Prix Dollar and Premio Roma. He was even better in the following year when he won the Prix Gontaut-Biron and a second Prix Dollar as well as finishing second in the Champion Stakes. In 2021 he won his first four races, namely the Prix Exbury, Prix d'Harcourt, Prix d'Ispahan and Bayerisches Zuchtrennen.

== Background ==
Skalleti is a grey horse bred in France by Guy Pariente Holding. As a yearling in 2016 he was consigned to the Arqana Deauville August sale and was bought by Alain Decrion for €85,000. He entered the ownership of Jean-Claude Seroul and was sent into training with Jerome Reynier.

He was from the sixth crop of foals sired by Kendargent who won two minor races and finished fourth in the Prix Jean Prat. His other foals have included Jimmy Two Times (Prix du Muguet), Tokyo Gold (Derby Italiano), Morando (Ormonde Stakes) and Goken (Prix du Bois). Skalleti's dam Skallet showed good racing ability, winning a Listed race and being placed three times at Group 3 level. She was descended from the French broodmare Le Mirambule (foaled 1949) who was the ancestor of many major winners including Nasram, Sagamix, Le Glorieux, Mogul and Lope de Vega.

== Racing career ==
=== 2018: three-year-old season ===
Skalleti began his racing career on 7 October 2018 when he won a minor race over 1900 metres on soft ground at Nimes. On his only other start of the year he won a 2000 metre race on the synthetic polytrack surface at Marseille Pont-de-Vivaux on 23 November.

=== 2019: four-year-old season ===
On his first start of 2019 Skalleti won a minor race at Marseille Pont-de-Vivaux on 11 January but when moved up in class for a Listed race at Cagnes-sur-Mer in February he finished unplaced behind Pump Pump Palace. Skalleti was ridden in his next four races by Maxime Guyon and won all of them. He took the Prix du Carrefour du Duc d'Enghien over 1600 metres on the polytrack at Chantilly Racecourse on 28 March, the Prix du Pont au Change on turf at Longchamp Racecourse on 4 May and the Grand Prix de Marseille-Vivaux over 2000 metres on 22 June. On 19 July he started 0.9/1 favourite when returned to Listed class for the Prix Jacques de Bremond on soft turf at Vichy and won by half a length from Wagram after taking the lead inside the last 200 metres.

Pierre-Charles Boudot rode Skalleti in his last three runs of the season. On 25 August the gelding was stepped up to Group 3 class for the first time and started the 3.1/1 second favourite for the Prix Quincey over the straight 1600 metre course at Deauville Racecourse. After being restrained towards the rear of the nine-runner field he took the lead 200 metres from the finish and stayed on well in the closing stages to win by a length from the five-year-old Stunning Spirit. At Longchamp on 5 October Skalleti started second choice in the betting for the Group 2 Prix Dollar over 1950 metres on very soft ground. He came from the rear of the field with a strong late run, took the lead in the closing stages and won by three quarters of a length from the British-trained gelding with the favourite Line of Duty, the winner of the Breeders' Cup Juvenile Turf, taking third place. Boudot said "My horse was relaxed, he was very comfortable on this ground. I found a gap and he pushed along courageously. Today, we see that he runs over this distance without a problem. He's a great horse."

For his final run of the season Skalleti was sent to Italy to contest the Group 2 Premio Roma over 2000 metres at Capannelle Racecourse on 3 November. He started odds-on favourite and took his winning streak to seven as he won "comfortably" by two lengths from Presley after producing his customary late run.

=== 2020: five-year-old season ===
In 2020, racing in Europe was disrupted by the COVID-19 pandemic with many races being cancelled, postponed or run at alternative venues. Skalleti began his campaign on 18 May and sustained his first defeat in well over a year as he came home third behind Pretreville and Plumatic in the Group 3 Prix Bertrand du Breuil at Chantilly Racecourse. On 28 June at Saint-Cloud Racecourse he finished third again, beaten one and a quarter lengths and three quarters of a length by Persian King and Pretreville in the Group 2 Prix du Muguet. At Deauville on 15 August Skalleti was partnered by Boudot when he started 2/1 second favourite behind Sottsass in the Prix Gontaut-Biron over 2000 metres on heavy ground. He settled towards the rear before overtaking Sottsass approaching the last 200 metres and held off a renewed challenge from the four-year-old favourite to win by a neck, with the pair finishing four lengths clear of the other five runners. After the race Reynier commented "Obviously he handles these conditions but he's not limited to running well on soft ground and has won on good. I'm sure Sottsass wasn't at 100 per cent today but I can assure you my horse was well below being fully tuned up as well. He is complicated at home but he has an unbelievable record."

At Longchamp on 3 October, with Guyon in the saddle, Skalleti started 1.2/1 favourite as he attempted to repeat his 2019 success in the Prix Dollar. After racing towards the rear of the field as usual he struggled to obtain a clear run in the straight but gained the advantage in the last 100 metres and won by one and three quarter lengths from the Irish-trained four-year-old Patrick Sarsfield. Guyon commented "We won so easily there, he loves that ground. He really is an incredibly classy horse... When I started to make a move through the field I really had a lot of horse. His trainer told me to try and come as late as I can because he only does what he needs to beat the rest.. It was very easy and I even eased up 20m from the line."

Two weeks after his second win in the Prix Dollar, Skalleti was sent to England to contest the Group 1 Champion Stakes over ten furlongs at Ascot Racecourse. He raced closer to the lead than usual and kept on well in the straight to run second to Addeybb with Magical, Serpentine, Pyledriver, Japan, Mishriff and Lord North finishing behind. He ended his campaign in Hong Kong on 13 December when he started 4.3/1 third favourite for the Hong Kong Cup at Sha Tin Racecourse but never looked likely to win and came home seventh of the eight starters behind the Japanese mare Normcore.

In the 2020 World's Best Racehorse Rankings, Skalleti was rated on 121, making him the thirty-fourth best racehorse in the world and the fourth-best horse in France.

=== 2021: six-year-old season ===
Skalleti began his 2021 campaign in the Group 3 Prix Exbury over 2000 metres at Saint-Cloud on 21 March when he was ridden by Boudot. Racing on his preferred heavy ground he started the 1/2 favourite and won "easily" by three and a half lengths from Grand Glory after gaining the advantage 400 metres from the finish. Gerald Mosse took the ride when Skalleti started odds-on favourite for the Group 2 Prix d'Harcourt over the same distance at Longchamp three weeks later. He was restrained towards the rear as usual before producing a strong late run, taking the lead 50 metres from the finish and winning by a length from Mare Australis.

Mosse retained the ride when the gelding started 0.7/1 favourite for the Group 1 Prix d'Ispahan over 1900 metres at Longchamp on 30 May. His five opponents were Victor Ludorum, Wally (Prix Edmond Blanc), Tilsit (Thoroughbred Stakes), Ecrivain (Prix des Chenes) and My Oberon (Earl of Sefton Stakes). Skalleti produced a strong late run on the outside and took the lead in the final strides to take his first Group 1 victory in a blanket finish, beating Tilsit and My Oberon by a head and a short neck. Reynier commented "In different conditions he has shown himself one of the best older horses in Europe and he has proved himself on ground other than soft. Everyone has been hung up on him winning a group 1 but that was never the sole priority—we really wanted to build a career with this horse... His main target for the year is to take his revenge in the Champion Stakes so we'll let him down for a while."

Despite Reynier's prediction that the horse would be rested, Skalleti was sent to Germany on 25 July and started odds-on favourite for the Group 1 Bayerisches Zuchtrennen over 2000 metres at Munich. With Mosse in the saddle he took the lead 200 metres and drew away to win "comfortably" by five lengths from Grocer Jack.

== Pedigree ==
Pedigree of Skalleti (FR), grey gelding, 2015
Sire Kendargent (FR) 2003	Kendor (FR); 1986	Kenmare	Kalamoun (GB)
Sire Kendargent (FR) 2003	Kendor (FR); 1986	Kenmare	Belle of Ireland (GB)
Sire Kendargent (FR) 2003	Kendor (FR); 1986	Belle Mecene	Gay Mecene (USA)
Sire Kendargent (FR) 2003	Kendor (FR); 1986	Belle Mecene	Djaka Belle
Sire Kendargent (FR) 2003	Pax Bella (FR); 1997	Linamix	Mendez
Sire Kendargent (FR) 2003	Pax Bella (FR); 1997	Linamix	Lunadix
Sire Kendargent (FR) 2003	Pax Bella (FR); 1997	Palavera	Bikala (IRE)
Sire Kendargent (FR) 2003	Pax Bella (FR); 1997	Palavera	Paulistana (USA)
Dam Skallet (FR) 2008	Muhaymin (USA); 2001	A P Indy	Seattle Slew
Dam Skallet (FR) 2008	Muhaymin (USA); 2001	A P Indy	Weekend Surprise
Dam Skallet (FR) 2008	Muhaymin (USA); 2001	Shadayid	Shadeed
Dam Skallet (FR) 2008	Muhaymin (USA); 2001	Shadayid	Desirable (IRE)
Dam Skallet (FR) 2008	Siran (FR); 1991	R B Chesne (GB)	Brigadier Gerard
Dam Skallet (FR) 2008	Siran (FR); 1991	R B Chesne (GB)	Vive La Reine
Dam Skallet (FR) 2008	Siran (FR); 1991	Surubinha	Solicitor
Dam Skallet (FR) 2008	Siran (FR); 1991	Surubinha	La Manouche (Family: 11-d)
