= Mare Australis =

Irish-bred Thoroughbred racehorse

- Sire: Australia
- Grandsire: Galileo
- Dam: Miramare
- Damsire: Rainbow Quest
- Sex: Colt
- Foaled: 11 March 2017
- Country: Ireland
- Colour: Chestnut
- Breeder: Stall Ullmann
- Owner: Gestut Schlenderhan; Corinna Baronin Von Ullmann
- Trainer: Jean-Pierre Carvalho; Andre Fabre
- Record: 6: 3-2-0
- Earnings: £216,072

Major wins
- Prix de l'Avre (2020); Prix Ganay (2021)

Mare Australis (foaled 11 March 2017) is an Irish-bred Thoroughbred racehorse. Originally trained in Germany, he won his only race as a two-year-old in 2019. In the following year, he was transferred to race in France where he won the Listed Prix de l'Avre and finished second in the Group 2 Prix du Conseil de Paris. In the spring of 2021, he ran second in the Prix d'Harcourt before winning the Group 1 Prix Ganay.

== Background ==
Mare Australis is a chestnut horse with a white star and white socks on his hind legs bred in Ireland by Stall Ullmann. He was sent into training with Jean-Pierre Carvalho in Germany and initially raced in the colours of Gestut Schlenderhan.

He was from the second crop of foals sired by Australia who won the Epsom Derby, Irish Derby and International Stakes in 2014. Mare Australis's dam Miramare showed good racing ability, winning one minor race in her native Germany and being placed three times in Listed class in the United Kingdom. She was a great-granddaughter of the Preis der Diana winner Majoritat whose other descendants have included Eishin Flash (Tokyo Yushun) and Mystic Lips (Preis der Diana).

== Racing career ==
=== 2019: two-year-old season ===
Mare Australis began his track career in a maiden race over 1,600 metres on soft ground at Munich on 3 November. Ridden by Filip Minarik he started the 11/10 favourite and won by half a length from the filly Zamrud.

=== 2020: three-year-old season ===
At the end of 2019, Gestut Schlenderhan closed their private training facility. For the 2020 season, Mare Australis moved into the ownership of Corinna Baronin Von Ullmann and was transferred to the stable of André Fabre at Chantilly in France. On his first appearance for his new connections, Mare Australis started favourite for the Prix Tourbillon over 2,100 metres at Saint-Cloud Racecourse on 12 May, but finished fourth behind Port Guillaume, Gold Trip and Dawn Intello, beaten three lengths by the winner. On 14 June, the colt was moved up in class and distance for the Listed Prix de l'Avre over 2,400 metres at Chantilly Racecourse in which he was ridden, as in all of his 2020 starts, by Pierre-Charles Boudot. He started the 1.7/1 favourite and won by a short neck from Frohsim. On his only subsequent start, Mare Australis contested the Group 2 Prix du Conseil de Paris on heavy ground at Longchamp Racecourse on 25 October. He was in contention from the start and stayed on well in the straight but failed by a head to overhaul the Irish-trained favourite Baron Samedi.

=== 2021: four-year-old season ===
Mare Australis began his third campaign in the Group 3 Prix d'Harcourt over 2,000 metres at Longchamp on 11 April. With Boudot in the saddle he started at odds of 7.8/1 and finished second to the six-year-old gelding Skalleti, beaten a length by the odds-on favourite. On 2 May, the colt was moved up to Group 1 class for the first time to contest the Prix Ganay over 2,100 metres at the same track and started the 5/2 second favourite behind Mogul in a seven-runner field which also included Magny Cours (Gala Stakes), Gold Trip (Prix Greffulhe), Ecrivain (Prix des Chenes) and Wonderful Moon (Union-Rennen). Boudot sent Mare Australis into the lead from the start and he was never seriously challenged, winning by one and three quarter lengths from Gold Trip despite being eased down in the closing stages. After the race, Fabre was asked about the horse's prospects in the Prix de l'Arc de Triomphe over 2,400 metres at the same track in October. He responded, "He'll be a better horse in the autumn and I always thought he was a horse for the Arc. He's just as good over both distances. He had no issues, he was just backward. I don't know if he'll run in the Grand Prix de Saint-Cloud or just a prep race and then the Arc."

== Pedigree ==
Pedigree of Mare Australis (IRE), chestnut colt, 2017
Sire Australia (IRE) 2011	Galileo (IRE); 1998	Sadler's Wells (USA)	Northern Dancer (CAN)
Sire Australia (IRE) 2011	Galileo (IRE); 1998	Sadler's Wells (USA)	Fairy Bridge
Sire Australia (IRE) 2011	Galileo (IRE); 1998	Urban Sea (USA)	Miswaki
Sire Australia (IRE) 2011	Galileo (IRE); 1998	Urban Sea (USA)	Allegretta (GB)
Sire Australia (IRE) 2011	Ouija Board (GB); 2001	Cape Cross (IRE)	Green Desert (USA)
Sire Australia (IRE) 2011	Ouija Board (GB); 2001	Cape Cross (IRE)	Park Appeal
Sire Australia (IRE) 2011	Ouija Board (GB); 2001	Selection Board	Welsh Pageant (FR)
Sire Australia (IRE) 2011	Ouija Board (GB); 2001	Selection Board	Ouija
Dam Miramare (GER) 2004	Rainbow Quest (USA); 1981	Blushing Groom (FR)	Red God (USA)
Dam Miramare (GER) 2004	Rainbow Quest (USA); 1981	Blushing Groom (FR)	Runaway Bride (GB)
Dam Miramare (GER) 2004	Rainbow Quest (USA); 1981	I Will Follow	Herbager (FR)
Dam Miramare (GER) 2004	Rainbow Quest (USA); 1981	I Will Follow	Where You Lead
Dam Miramare (GER) 2004	Minaccia (GER); 1995	Platini	Surumu
Dam Miramare (GER) 2004	Minaccia (GER); 1995	Platini	Prairie Darling (IRE)
Dam Miramare (GER) 2004	Minaccia (GER); 1995	Maji (GB)	Shareef Dancer (USA)
Dam Miramare (GER) 2004	Minaccia (GER); 1995	Maji (GB)	Majoritat (GER) (Family: 8-a)
