= Prix Exbury =

Flat horse race in France

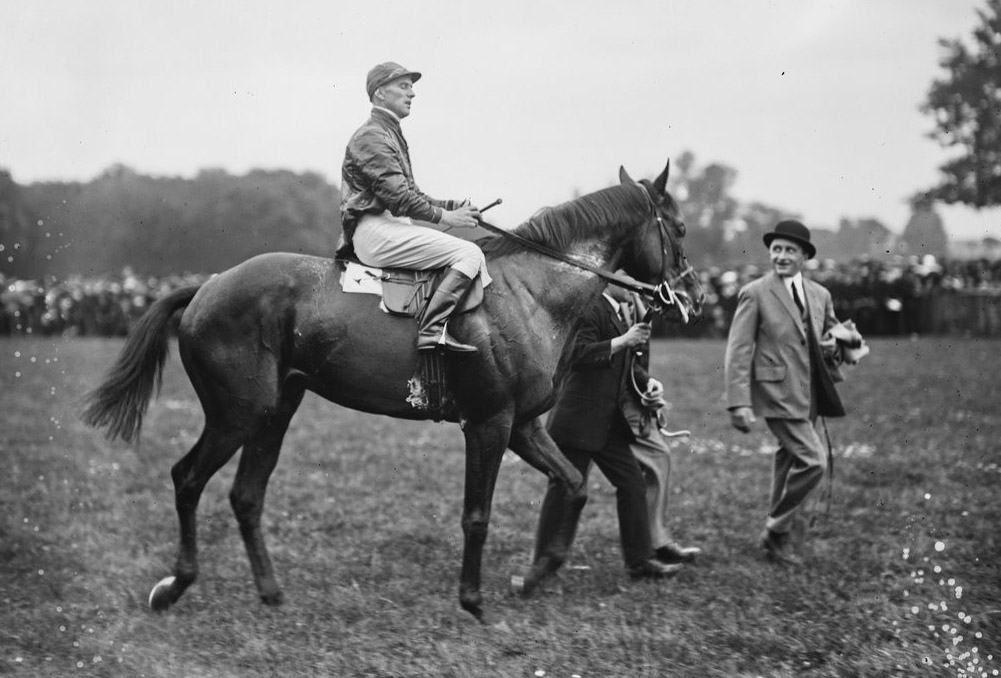
- Le Capucin winner in 1925
- Class: Group 3
- Location: Saint-Cloud Racecourse; Saint-Cloud, France
- Inaugurated: 1891
- Race type: Flat / Thoroughbred
- Website: france-galop.com

Race information
- Distance: 2,000 metres (1¼ miles)
- Surface: Turf
- Track: Left-handed
- Qualification: Four-years-old and up
- Weight: 57 kg Allowances; 1 kg if not Group placed * Penalties; 3 kg for Group 1 winners * 2 kg for Group 2 winners * 1 kg for Group 3 winners * * since 1 September last year
- Purse: €80,000 (2025); 1st: €40,000

Prix Exbury
2023
Haya Zark	Skalleti	Kertez

Previous years
2022
Pretty Tiger	Hurricane Dream	Skalleti
2021
Skalleti	Grand Glory	Ecrivain

2020-2011
2020
Simona	Spirit Of Nelson	Pappalino
2019
Soleil Marin	Magny Cours	Air Pilot
2018
Air Pilot	Way To Paris	Star Victory
2017
Cloth Of Stars	Star Victory	Cafe Royal
2016
Garlingari	Sumbal	Affaire Solitaire
2015
Affaire Solitaire	Meadow Creek	Arkaitz
2014
Norse King	Singing	Rose Vista
2013
Saga Dream	Don Bosco	Espero
2012
Chinchon	War Is War	Saga Dream
2011
Polytechnicien	Cirrus Des Aigles	Silver Pond

2010–2001
2010
Chinchon	Starlish	La Boum
2009
Court Canibal	Diyakalanie	Chinchon
2008
Spirit One	Balius	Aspectus
2007
Pearl Sky	Elasos	Runaway
2006
Kendor Dine	Special Kaldoun	Gold Sound
2005
Samando	Lord Du Sud	Pont D'Or
2004
Polish Summer	Bright Sky	Samando
2003
Aquarelliste	Caesarion	Border Arrow
2002
Jomana	Five Fishes	Maid Of Dawkins
2001
Earlene	Bleu D'Altair	Honorifique

2000–1995
2000
Russian Hope	Amilynx	Double Heart
1999
Barbola	Borgia	Jim And Tonic
1998
Loup Sauvage	Astarabad	Jim And Tonic
1997
Nero Zilzal	Le Destin	Thames
1996
Gunboat Diplomacy	Red Roses Story	Tot Ou Tard
1995
Tuesday's Special	En Cascade	Matarun

The Prix Exbury is a Group 3 flat horse race in France open to thoroughbreds aged four years or older. It is run over a distance of 2,000 metres (about 1¼ miles) at Saint-Cloud in March.

== History ==
The event was originally called the Prix Boiard. It was named after Boiard, a successful racehorse in the 1870s. It was established in 1891, and initially run at Maisons-Laffitte over 2,000 metres. It was open to horses aged three or older.

The race was renamed in memory of Eugène Adam (1840–1904), a former president of the Société Sportive d'Encouragement, in 1905. It reverted to its original title when the present Prix Eugène Adam was given its name in 1911.

The Prix Boiard was abandoned from 1915 to 1918. It was contested at Saint-Cloud over 2,100 metres in 1919. It returned to Maisons-Laffitte in 1920, and began a longer spell at Saint-Cloud in 1929. Its distance was 2,100 metres in 1931 and 1932.

The event was held at Longchamp from 1940 to 1942. It was run at Le Tremblay over 2,150 metres in 1943, and Maisons-Laffitte over 2,200 metres in 1944 and 1945. It returned to Saint-Cloud in 1946.

The race was won by a horse called Exbury in 1963, and it was renamed in his honour in 1969. From this point it was closed to three-year-olds. It was given Group 3 status in 1971.

The Prix Exbury is usually France's first Group race of the year.

== Records ==
Most successful horse (2 wins):

- Fourire – 1899, 1900
- Macdonald II – 1904, 1905
- Djebel – 1941, 1942
- Un Gaillard – 1943, 1944
- Yaxilio – 1970, 1971
- Mister Sic Top – 1972, 1973
- Chinchon – 2010, 2012
- Haya Zark - 2023, 2024

Leading jockey (7 wins):

- Olivier Peslier – Matarun (1994), Gunboat Diplomacy (1996), Nero Zilzal (1997), Loup Sauvage (1998), Court Canibal (2009), Polytechnicien (2011), Chinchon (2012)
- Christophe Soumillon - Polish Summer (2004), Spirit One (2008), Chinchon (2010), Air Pilot (2018), Pretty Tiger (2022), Haya Zark (2023, 2024)

Leading trainer (10 wins):

- André Fabre – Al Nasr (1982), Imyar (1983), Mille Balles (1984), Village Star (1987), Tuesday's Special (1995), Loup Sauvage (1998), Polish Summer (2004), Polytechnicien (2011), Cloth of Stars (2017), Soleil Marin (2019), Bright Picture (2026)

Leading owner (7 wins):

- Marcel Boussac – Goyescas (1933), Goya II (1940), Djebel (1941, 1942), Ardan (1945), Goyama (1947), Nirgal (1948)

== Winners since 1981 ==
Year	Winner	Age	Jockey	Trainer	Owner	Time
1981	Armistice Day	5	Yves Saint-Martin	C. de Watrigant	Luis Urbano Sanabria	2:19.30
1982	Al Nasr	4	Alain Lequeux	André Fabre	Moufid Dabaghi	2:26.80
1983	Imyar	4	Alain Badel	André Fabre	Peter Baumgartner	2:18.20
1984	Mille Balles	4	Freddy Head	André Fabre	Guy de Rothschild	2:15.50
1985	Darly	6	Freddy Head	David Smaga	Georges Blizniansky
1986	New Target	5	Jean-Michel Breux	Élie Lellouche	Mrs Gerard Sarfati
1987	Village Star	4	Dominique Regnard	André Fabre	Tony Richards	2:10.80
1988	Coeur de Lion	4	Yvonnick Claudic	J. R. Lyon	Richard Swift	2:25.40
1989	Saint Andrews	5	Alain Badel	Jean-Marie Béguigné	Suzy Volterra	2:18.90
1990	Mansonnien	6	Dominique Boeuf	Noël Pelat	Mrs Bernard Destremau	2:07.90
1991	Leariva	4	Alain Lequeux	David Smaga	Thierry van Zuylen	2:18.70
1992	Fortune's Wheel	4	Mathieu Boutin	Robert Collet	Richard Strauss	2:13.70
1993	Urban Sea	4	Mathieu Boutin	Jean Lesbordes	David Tsui	2:09.20
1994	Matarun	6	Olivier Peslier	Henri van de Poele	Roland Soula	2:15.10
1995	Tuesday's Special	5	Thierry Jarnet	André Fabre	Patrick Offenstadt	2:24.70
1996	Gunboat Diplomacy	5	Olivier Peslier	Élie Lellouche	Daniel Wildenstein	2:08.60
1997	Nero Zilzal	4	Olivier Peslier	Élie Lellouche	Osvaldo Pedroni	2:11.50
1998	Loup Sauvage	4	Olivier Peslier	André Fabre	Daniel Wildenstein	2:18.80
1999	Barbola	4	Thierry Thulliez	Jean de Roualle	Bob McCreery	2:17.60
2000	Russian Hope	5	Goulven Toupel	Henri-Alex Pantall	Edouard de Rothschild	2:15.30
2001	Earlene	4	Thierry Thulliez	Henri-Alex Pantall	Sheikh Mohammed	2:24.70
2002	Jomana	4	Olivier Plaçais	Henri-Alex Pantall	Sheikh Mohammed	2:14.40
2003	Aquarelliste	5	Dominique Boeuf	Élie Lellouche	Ecurie Wildenstein	2:13.85
2004	Polish Summer	7	Christophe Soumillon	André Fabre	Khalid Abdullah	2:10.70
2005	Samando	5	Éric Legrix	François Doumen	Hans Wirth	2:16.40
2006	Kendor Dine	4	Stéphane Pasquier	Yves de Nicolay	Didier Kahn	2:15.60
2007	Pearl Sky	4	Anthony Crastus	Yves de Nicolay	Hugh Hogg	2:13.80
2008	Spirit One	4	Christophe Soumillon	Philippe Demercastel	Bouzid Chehboub	2:12.80
2009	Court Canibal	4	Olivier Peslier	Mikel Delzangles	Marquesa de Moratalla	2:14.20
2010	Chinchon	5	Christophe Soumillon	Carlos Laffon-Parias	SARL Darpat France	2:16.60
2011	Polytechnicien	5	Olivier Peslier	André Fabre	Wertheimer et Frère	2:10.50
2012	Chinchon	7	Olivier Peslier	Carlos Laffon-Parias	SARL Darpat France	2:08.10
2013	Saga Dream	7	Thierry Jarnet	Freddy Lemercier	Freddy Lemercier	2:20.11
2014	Norse King	5	Alexis Badel	Myriam Bollack-Badel	Jeff Smith	2:10.19
2015	Affaire Solitaire	5	Nicolas Perret	Patrick Khozian	Luigi Roveda	2:08.54
2016	Garlingari	5	Stéphane Pasquier	Corine Barande-Barbe	Corine Barande-Barbe	2:09.98
2017	Cloth of Stars	4	Mickael Barzalona	André Fabre	Godolphin	2:07.05
2018	Air Pilot	9	Christophe Soumillon	Ralph Beckett	Lady Cobham	2:24.49
2019	Soleil Marin	5	Pierre-Charles Boudot	André Fabre	Godolphin	2:17.29
2020	Simona	4	Alexis Badel	Francis-Henry Graffard	Nigel & Carolyn Elwes	2:14.87
2021	Skalleti	6	Pierre-Charles Boudot	Jerome Reynier	Jean-Claude Seroul	2:11:11
2022	Pretty Tiger	4	Christophe Soumillon	Fabrice Vermeulen	Bernard Giraudon	2:06.11
2023	Haya Zark	4	Christophe Soumillon	Adrien Fouassier	Odette Fau	2:11.18
2024	Haya Zark	5	Christophe Soumillon	Adrien Fouassier	Odette Fau	2:25.22
2025	Map of Stars	4	James Doyle	Francis-Henri Graffard	Wathnan Racing	2:12.39
2026	Bright Picture	5	Maxime Guyon	André Fabre	Wertheimer et Frère	2:15.64

== Earlier winners ==
- 1891: Sledge
- 1892: Courlis
- 1893: Hoche
- 1894: Fousi Yama
- 1895: Merlin
- 1896: Omnium II
- 1897: Castelnau
- 1898: Quilda
- 1899: Fourire
- 1900: Fourire
- 1901: Codoman
- 1902: Cheri
- 1903: La Camargo
- 1904: Macdonald II
- 1905: Macdonald II
- 1906: Prestige
- 1907: Maintenon
- 1908: Biniou
- 1909: Verdun
- 1910: Lieutel
- 1911: Badajoz
- 1912: Martial
- 1913: Isard
- 1914: Nimbus
- 1915–18: no race
- 1919: Mont Saint Eloi
- 1920: Tchad
- 1921: Souviens Toi
- 1922: Cid Campeador
- 1923: Niceas
- 1924: Sir Gallahad
- 1925: Le Capucin
- 1926: Cerulea
- 1927: King's Darling
- 1928: Motrico
- 1929: Tuvari
- 1930: Mysarch
- 1931: Le Tourbillon
- 1932: Parsee
- 1933: Goyescas
- 1934: Le Centaure
- 1935: Farfadette
- 1936: Renette
- 1937: Le Calme
- 1938: Sanguinetto
- 1939: Feerie
- 1940: Goya II
- 1941: Djebel
- 1942: Djebel
- 1943: Un Gaillard
- 1944: Un Gaillard
- 1945: Ardan
- 1946: Oural
- 1947: Goyama
- 1948: Nirgal
- 1949: Tharsis
- 1950: Wild Mec
- 1951: Alizier
- 1952: L'Aiglon
- 1953: Fine Top
- 1954: Banassa
- 1955: Soleil Levant
- 1956: Tropique
- 1957: Fric
- 1958: Mon Triomphe
- 1959: Tombeur
- 1960: Siva
- 1961: Djebel Traffic
- 1962: Match
- 1963: Exbury
- 1964: Prima Donna
- 1965: Free Ride
- 1966: Diatome
- 1967: Claquesous
- 1968: Taglietto
- 1969: Carmarthen
- 1970: Yaxilio
- 1971: Yaxilio
- 1972: Mister Sic Top
- 1973: Mister Sic Top
- 1974: Shari
- 1975: no race *
- 1976: Citoyen
- 1977: Cheraw
- 1978: Pappagallo
- 1979: Tempus Fugit
- 1980: Kamaridaan

* The 1975 running was abandoned because of snow.

== See also ==
- List of French flat horse races
- Recurring sporting events established in 1891 – this race is included under its original title, Prix Boiard.
