= Prix d'Aumale =

Flat horse race in France

- Class: Group 2
- Location: Longchamp Racecourse; Paris, France
- Inaugurated: 1921
- Race type: Flat / Thoroughbred
- Website: france-galop.com

Race information
- Distance: 1,600 metres (1 mile)
- Surface: Turf
- Track: Right-handed
- Qualification: Two-year-old fillies exc. G2 / dual G3 winners
- Weight: 55 kg Penalties; 3 kg for Group 3 winners
- Purse: €56,000 (2020); 1st: €28,000

Prix d'Aumale
2024
Zarigana	Angeal	Rosa Salvaje

Previous years
2023
Freville	Kalispera	Alshinfarah
2022
Blue Rose Cen	Heavenly Breath	Start Me Up
2021
Fleur D'Iris	Zellie	Bahasa

2020-2011
2020
King's Harlequin	Harajuku	Coeursamba
2019
Savarin	Secret Time	Flighty Lady
2018
Rocques	Ceratonia	La Feve
2017
Soustraction	Efaadah	Wild Illusion
2016
Toulifaut	Normandel	Asidious Alexander
2015
Antonoe	Pleasemetoo	Gherdaiya
2014
Shahah	Night Of Light	Thank You Bye Bye
2013
Lesstalk In Paris	Straight Thinking	Marbre Rose
2012
Peace Burg	Single	Indigo Lady
2011
Zantenda	Rajastani	Kinetica

2010-2001
2010
Helleborine	Immortal Verse	Nitza
2009
Middle Club	Baahama	On Verra
2008
Soneva	Article Rare	Denomination
2007
Top Toss	Mousse Au Chocolat	African Rose
2006
Poltava	Ikat	Sismix
2005
Sirene Doloise	Blue Blue Sky	Queensalsa
2004
Faint Heart	Portrayal	Victoria Page
2003
Green Noon	Leila	Anabaa Republic
2002
Loving Pride	Welcome Millenium	High Praise
2001
Quad's Melody	Melody Blue	Kithira

2000-1990
2000
Green Minstrel	Winter Solstice	Choc Ice
1999
Dignify	Well Minded	Acceleration
1998
Saytarra	Juvenia	Hello Soso
1997
Anna Palariva	Fairly Grey	Cortona
1996
Joyeuse Entree	Dissertation	Nawal
1995
Shake The Yoke	Miss Tahiti	Raisonnable
1994
Ghostly	Slewvera	Chrysalu
1993
Bonash	Flagbird	Sierra Madre
1992
Kindergarten	Lorelie	Zigreen
1991
Guislaine	Hatoof	Lady Normandy
1990
Magic Night	Sha Tha Ex Sabana	Caerlina

The Prix d'Aumale is a Group 2 flat horse race in France open to two-year-old thoroughbred fillies. It is run at Longchamp over a distance of 1,600 metres (about 1 mile), and it is scheduled to take place each year in September. The race was promoted to Group 2 from Group 3 in 2025.

== History ==
The earliest version of the Prix d'Aumale was established in 1835. It was staged at Chantilly until the end of the July Monarchy in 1848.

The present event is named after Henri d'Orléans (1822–1897), who inherited the title Duc d'Aumale. Upon his death the Duc bequeathed his Chantilly estate, including the racecourse and the château, to the Institut de France.

The modern Prix d'Aumale was introduced in 1921. It originally took place at Chantilly, and was contested by horses of either gender.

The event was abandoned during World War II, with no running from 1940 to 1945. In the post-war years it was held at Longchamp (1946–1947, 1949–1951, 1955), Chantilly (1948) and Deauville (1952–1954). It began a longer spell at Chantilly in 1956.

The race was restricted to fillies and transferred to Longchamp in 1966. It was not run from 1969 to 1971, and resumed at Longchamp in 1972. It returned to Chantilly in 1973, and was given Group 3 status in 1979.

Since the 1970s, the venue of the Prix d'Aumale has been switched between Chantilly (1973–82, 1997–2001, 2004–09, 2012–17) and Longchamp (1983–96, 2002–03, 2010–11, 2018–2020).

== Records ==
Leading jockey (6 wins):

- Rae Johnstone – Ninon (1934), Bland Caress (1935), Balaton (1946), Amour Drake (1948), Pharsale (1950), Chateau Latour (1955)
- Roger Poincelet – Noory (1952), Beigler Bey (1953), Iadwiga (1958), Tapageur (1962), Neptunus (1963), Ailes du Chant (1966)

Leading trainer (6 wins):

- François Boutin – Antrona (1975), Play It Safe (1981), Air Distingue (1982), Coup de Folie (1984), Mackla (1989), Ghostly (1994)
- André Fabre – Kindergarten (1992), Bonash (1993), Anna Palariva (1997), Shahah (2014), Savarin (2019), Fleur D'Iris (2021)

Leading owner (4 wins):

- Jean Stern – White Wing (1922), Arpette (1932), Amalaric (1933), Star (1960)

== Winners since 1979 ==
Year	Winner	Jockey	Trainer	Owner	Time
1979	Indigene	Jean-Pierre Lefèvre	Philippe Lallié	Lawrence Gelb
1980	Ukraine Girl	Yves Saint-Martin	Robert Collet	Meg Mullion
1981	Play It Safe	Philippe Paquet	François Boutin	Diana Firestone
1982	Air Distingue	Jean-Luc Kessas	François Boutin	Martha Miller
1983	Eastern Dawn	Freddy Head	Jean de Roualle	Martha Miller
1984	Coup de Folie	Cash Asmussen	François Boutin	Stavros Niarchos
1985	Galunpe	Jean-Luc Kessas	Bernard Sécly	J. M. Aubry-Dumand
1986	Princesse du Bourg	Daniel Vignali	Raymond Touflan	Adolf Bader
1987	Riviere d'Or	Gary W. Moore	Criquette Head	Jacques Wertheimer
1988	Mary Linoa	Alain Lequeux	David Smaga	David Smaga	1:40.20
1989	Mackla	Freddy Head	François Boutin	Mrs Gerry Oldham	1:43.50
1990	Magic Night	Dominique Boeuf	Philippe Demercastel	Mrs P. Demercastel	1:41.00
1991	Guislaine	Dominique Boeuf	Pascal Bary	Jean-Louis Bouchard	1:40.20
1992	Kindergarten	Steve Cauthen	André Fabre	Sheikh Mohammed	1:44.60
1993	Bonash	Pat Eddery	André Fabre	Khalid Abdullah	1:49.20
1994	Ghostly	Cash Asmussen	François Boutin	Ecurie Skymarc Farm	1:45.50
1995	Shake The Yoke	Dominique Boeuf	Élie Lellouche	Serge Brunswick	1:43.60
1996	Joyeuse Entree	Gérald Mossé	Alain de Royer-Dupré	Marquesa de Moratalla	1:39.10
1997	Anna Palariva	Olivier Peslier	André Fabre	Sheikh Mohammed	1:38.10
1998	Saytarra	Frankie Dettori	David Loder	Saeed bin M. Al Maktoum	1:42.70
1999	Dignify	Sylvain Guillot	David Loder	Godolphin	1:41.70
2000	Green Minstrel	Olivier Peslier	Jean-Marie Béguigné	Xavier Beau	1:42.80
2001	Quad's Melody	Thierry Jarnet	Jean-Marie Béguigné	Ecurie Fabien Ouaki	1:47.40
2002	Loving Pride	Ronan Thomas	Criquette Head-Maarek	Maktoum Al Maktoum	1:39.20
2003	Green Noon	Yann Lerner	Carlos Lerner	Martine Gerles	1:37.50
2004	Birthstone	Christophe Lemaire	Henri-Alex Pantall	Sheikh Mohammed	1:38.90
2005	Sirene Doloise	Stéphane Pasquier	Alain Bonin	C. Hennel de Beaupréau	1:39.10
2006	Poltava	Dominique Boeuf	David Smaga	Malcolm Parrish	1:39.40
2007	Top Toss	Christophe Soumillon	Yves de Nicolay	Ecurie Skymarc Farm	1:40.90
2008	Soneva	Christophe Soumillon	Yves de Nicolay	Arno Curty	1:41.80
2009	Middle Club	Ioritz Mendizabal	Richard Hannon Sr.	Bob McCreery	1:37.50
2010	Helleborine	Stéphane Pasquier	Criquette Head-Maarek	Khalid Abdullah	1:47.90
2011	Zantenda	Olivier Peslier	Freddy Head	Wertheimer et Frère	1:40.70
2012	Peace Burg	Ioritz Mendizabal	Jacques Heloury	Ecurie D. Primes	1:41.03
2013	Lesstalk in Paris	Ioritz Mendizabal	Jean-Claude Rouget	Ecurie J-L Tepper	1:38.91
2014	Shahah	Pierre-Charles Boudot	André Fabre	Al Shaqab Racing	1:37.96
2015	Antonoe	Vincent Cheminaud	Pascal Bary	Khalid Abdullah	1:40.37
2016	Toulifaut	Ioritz Mendizabal	Jean-Claude Rouget	Andrew-James Smith	1:40.95
2017	Soustraction	Maxime Guyon	Carlos Laffon-Parias	Wertheimer et Frère	1:37.88
2018	Rocques	Pierre-Charles Boudot	Fabrice Chappet	Gérard Augustin-Normand et al.	1:40.51
2019	Savarin	Pierre-Charles Boudot	André Fabre	Masaki Matsushima	1:39.18
2020	King's Harlequin	Pierre-Charles Boudot	Nicolas Clement	Sam Sangster, Reeves Et Al	1:40.86
2021	Fleur D'Iris	Mickael Barzalona	André Fabre	Godolphin	1:40.43
2022	Blue Rose Cen	Aurelien Lemaitre	Christopher Head	Yeguada Centurion	1:41.81
2023	Freville	Aurelien Lemaitre	Christopher Head	Gerard Augustin-Normand	1:40.73
2024	Zarigana	Mickael Barzalona	Francis-Henri Graffard	H H Aga Khan	1:44.58
2025	Green Spirit	Maxime Guyon	Christopher Head	Wertheimer & Frere	1:39.95
2026	Rogue Passion	Rossa Ryan	Edward Bethell	Rogues Gallery Racing	1:36.57

== Earlier winners ==
- 1921: Zariba
- 1922: White Wing
- 1923: Doddles
- 1924: Pervencheres
- 1925: Diplomate
- 1926: Fairy Legend
- 1927: Cestona
- 1928: Negron
- 1929: Diademe
- 1930: Taraskoia
- 1931: Shelley
- 1932: Arpette
- 1933: Amalaric
- 1934: Ninon
- 1935: Bland Caress
- 1936: May Wong
- 1937: Castel Fusano
- 1938: Ravioli
- 1939: Lighthouse
- 1940–45: no race
- 1946: Balaton
- 1947:
- 1948: Amour Drake
- 1949: Nuit de Folies
- 1950: Pharsale
- 1951: Faubourg
- 1952: Noory
- 1953: Beigler Bey
- 1954: Soleil Royal
- 1955: Chateau Latour
- 1956: Jabot
- 1957: Yla
- 1958: Iadwiga
- 1959: Drago
- 1960: Star
- 1961: Hodell
- 1962: Tapageur
- 1963: Neptunus
- 1964: Prince du Vent
- 1965: Nasambi
- 1966: Ailes du Chant
- 1967: Ortanique
- 1968: Kerande
- 1969–71: no race
- 1972: Amira
- 1973: Tropical Cream
- 1974: Seventh Heaven
- 1975: Antrona
- 1976: Proud Event
- 1977: Pink Valley
- 1978: Dunette

== See also ==
- List of French flat horse races
