= Dunette =

French-bred Thoroughbred racehorse

- Sire: Hard To Beat
- Grandsire: Hardicanute
- Dam: Pram
- Damsire: Fine Top
- Sex: Mare
- Foaled: 30 March 1976
- Country: France
- Colour: Bay
- Breeder: Haras La Verrerie de la Brosse
- Owner: Harry Love
- Trainer: Emmanuel, Chevalier du Fau
- Record: 13: 5-1-1

Major wins
- Prix d'Aumale (1978); Prix de Diane (1979); Grand Prix de Saint-Cloud (1980); Prix du Prince d'Orange (1980)

Awards
- Timeform rating 108 (1978), 127 (1979), 122 (1980)

Dunette (30 March 1976 – 25 April 1998) was a French Thoroughbred racehorse and broodmare. In three seasons of racing she won five of her thirteen races and twice defeated the outstanding racemare Three Troikas. As a two-year-old she showed considerable promise by winning two of her three races including the Prix d'Aumale. In the following year she was beaten by Three Troikas in her first two races before springing a 50/1 upset over her great rival in the Prix de Diane. As a four-year-old she dead-heated for first place in the Grand Prix de Saint-Cloud and successfully conceded weight to Three Troikas in the Prix du Prince d'Orange. She was rated the second-best filly of her generation in Europe in both 1979 and 1980. After her retirement from racing she had some success as a broodmare, producing the Canadian International Stakes winner French Glory.

== Background ==
Dunette was a bay mare with a white star bred in France by the Haras La Verrerie de la Brosse. Her sire Hard To Beat was an Irish-bred, French-trained horse whose wins included the Grand Critérium, Prix Lupin and Prix du Jockey Club. He stood for three seasons in Europe before being exported to Japan, siring a few top-class performers in either location. Dunette was the third foal of her dam Pram, who was a winner in France and a daughter of Gourabe who finished second in the Prix Vermeille.

Dunette was sent to the Deauville yearling sale in 1977 but failed to make her reserve price and later entered the ownership of Mme H. A. Love. The filly was trained by Emmanuel, Chevalier du Fau and was ridden in most of her races by Georges Doleuze. Dunette was a nervous filly who often sweated badly before her races and was a poor traveller. Her name is French for "poop deck".

== Racing career ==
=== 1978: two-year-old season ===
Dunette began her racing career in a maiden race over 1200 metres at Saint-Cloud Racecourse in July and won by four lengths. She was moved up in class and distance for the Group Three Prix d'Aumale over 1600 metres at Chantilly Racecourse in September and won again, beating Minstrel Girl by one and a half lengths with Cheerfully in third place. The filly was stepped up again in class for the Critérium des Pouliches at Longchamp Racecourse and started 2/1 second favourite behind the Prix Robert Papin winner Pitasia. She failed to reproduce her Chantilly form, finishing fifth behind Pitasia, Minstrel Girl, Cheerfully and La Trinite.

=== 1979: three-year-old season ===
Dunette began her second season in the Prix Vanteaux over 1900 metres at Longchamp on 16 April in which she was matched for the first time against the Alec Head trained Three Troikas. She was no match for the Head filly but was a clear second best, finishing three lengths behind the winner and four clear of Felix Culpa in third. Her next appearance was the Prix Saint-Alary over 2000 metres at the same course on 20 May when she started 11/1 fourth choice in the betting behind Three Troikas who had won the Poule d'Essai des Pouliches in the interim. She set off at an exceptional pace, proving too fast for the Head stable's pacemaker Sealy, but was exhausted by the final turn and faded to finish fifth behind Three Troikas, Pitasia, Salpinx and Karinetta.

On 10 June, Dunette started a 50/1 outsider for the 130th running of the Prix de Diane (sponsored by Revlon) over 2000 metres at Chantilly. Three Troikas, coupled in the betting with her pacemaker Sealy, started at odds of 1/10 ahead of Producer (winner of the Prix de Royaumont), Nonoalca (runner-up in the Poule d'Essai des Pouliches), Cheerfully, Pitasia and Salpinx. In contrast to her previous run, Dunette was successfully restrained by Doleuze and turned into the straight in seventh or eighth place. Three Troikas went to the front from Nonoalca and Producer but Dunette produced a sustained run on the outside to catch the previously unbeaten favourite 50 metres from the finish and won by a nose. There was a gap of two and a half lengths back to Producer who took third ahead of Pitasia, Salpinx and the fading Nonoalca.

After a break of three months, Dunette returned in September for the Prix Vermeille at Longchamp. She started at odds of 9/1 in a very strong field which included Three Troikas, Pitasia, Producer and Salpinx as well as The Oaks winner Scintillate and the Prix Minerve winner Anifa. Racing over 2400 metres for the first time she finished fourth of the thirteen runners behind Three Troikas, Salpinx and Pitasia, beaten just over two lengths by the winner.

=== 1980: four-year-old season ===
On her debut as a four-year-old, Dunette was matched against male opposition for the first time and finished third behind Scorpio and Gain in the Grand Prix d'Evry on 1 May. She started 9/10 favourite for La Coupe at Chantilly on 15 June but ran poorly, finishing fifth of the seven runners behind the François Boutin-trained Prove It Baby. In the Grand Prix de Saint-Cloud over 2500 metres on 6 July, Dunette started 6/1 fourth choice in the betting behind Scorpio (who had won the Hardwicke Stakes at Royal Ascot), Shakapour and the Prix du Jockey Club winner Policeman. The other contenders included Gain, Lancastrian and the Prix Lupin winner Belgio. Dunette tracked the leaders before moving forward to take the lead from Policeman 200 metres from the finish. In the closing stages he faced a strong challenge from Shakapour and the two horses crossed the line together with the racecourse judges declaring a dead heat. Doleuze was criticised for raising his arm to celebrate victory at the finish, although Shakapour's jockey Yves Saint-Martin was also at fault, having dropped his whip in the closing stages. Later in July, she was sent overseas for the first time to contest Britain's most prestigious weight-for-age race, the King George VI and Queen Elizabeth Stakes over one and a half miles at Ascot Racecourse. She made steady progress on the outside in the straight without ever looking likely to win and finished fourth behind Ela-Mana-Mou, Mrs Penny and Gregorian.

Dunette was ruled out of a run in the Prix Foy after suffering a bout of colic and returned in the Prix du Prince d'Orance over 2000 metres at Longchamp on 21 September. She started second favourite behind Three Troikas (the fillies were meeting for the fifth time) with the other runners including Providential and Northern Baby. Despite conceding two pounds to her old rival, Dunette won comfortably by half a length from Three Troikas with Doloeuze patting her on the head as she crossed the line. Northern Baby was a further length and a half away in third ahead of Viteric and Providential. Two weeks later, Dunette started at odds of 15/1 in a twenty-runner field for the Prix de l'Arc de Triomphe. She was prominent from the start and looked to have a good chance in the straight but was unable to quicken in the closing stages and finished seventh behind Detroit, Argument, Ela-Mana-Mou, Three Troikas, Nebos and Nicholas Bill.

== Assessment ==
In the 1978 official French handicap for two-year-olds, Dunette was rated fourteen pounds inferior to the top-rated filly Sigy. The independent Timeform organisation gave her a rating of 108, twenty-four pounds behind Sigy. In their annual Racehorses of 1978 Timeform commented that she would be "suited by 1¼m" and was "probably better than her running in the Pouliches" suggested. In the following year Timeform awarded her a mark of 127, making her the third-best female racehorse in Europe behind Three Troikas (133) and Producer (130). The International Classification for 1979 rated Dunette the second-best three-year-old filly in Europe, nine pounds behind Three Troikas. In 1980 she was rated 122 by Timeform, six pounds behind their top-rated older female Three Troikas. The International Classification rated her the second-best older female in Europe, two pounds behind Three Troikas and level with Kilijaro.

== Breeding record ==
Dunette was retired from racing at the end of the 1980 season to become a broodmare. After several seasons in Europe she was exported to Japan. She produced at least eight foals and five winners between 1984 and 1998. Dunette died 25 April 1998 after foaling Grand Dunette.

- Golden Isle, a bay colt (later gelded), foaled in 1984, sired by Golden Fleece. Won seven National Hunt races.
- Donya, bay filly, 1985, by Mill Reef. Failed to win in two races. Grand-dam of the Celebration Mile winner Afsare
- French Glory, bay colt, 1986, by Sadler's Wells. Won four races including La Coupe, Prix Maurice de Nieuil, Rothmans International
- Lawful, bay filly, 1987, by Law Society. Finished second in both her races. Her 1994 filly, Isabella Gonzaga won five races in the UK.
- Choreographer, bay colt, 1988, by Sadler's Wells. Won one race.
- Dreaming Girl, chestnut mare, 1989, by Lomond. Second on her only race in Japan. Her 1998 filly, Dream Come Come won the 2004 Fukushima Minyu Cup and TV Aichi Open in Japan.
- Top Lomond, bay colt, 1990, by Lomond. Won five races in Japan.
- Davis, bay colt (later gelded), 1991, by Crystal Glitters. Won ten races in Japan.
- Reina Dunette, bay filly, 1992, by Symboli Rudolf. Win-less in three starts in Japan. She died in 1999 without producing a foal.
- Grand Dunette, bay filly, 1998, by Summer Suspicion. Won one race in Japan. Died in 2003 after foaling the filly River Seine.

== Pedigree ==
Pedigree of Dunette, bay mare, 1976
Sire Hard To Beat (IRE) 1969	Hardicanute (GB); 1962	Hard Ridden	Hard Sauce
Sire Hard To Beat (IRE) 1969	Hardicanute (GB); 1962	Hard Ridden	Toute Belle
Sire Hard To Beat (IRE) 1969	Hardicanute (GB); 1962	Harvest Maid	Umidwar
Sire Hard To Beat (IRE) 1969	Hardicanute (GB); 1962	Harvest Maid	Hay Fell
Sire Hard To Beat (IRE) 1969	Virtuous (GB); 1962	Above Suspicion	Court Martial
Sire Hard To Beat (IRE) 1969	Virtuous (GB); 1962	Above Suspicion	Above Board
Sire Hard To Beat (IRE) 1969	Virtuous (GB); 1962	Rose of India	Tulyar
Sire Hard To Beat (IRE) 1969	Virtuous (GB); 1962	Rose of India	Eastern Grandeur
Dam Pram (FR) 1969	Fine Top (FR); 1949	Fine Art	Artists Proof
Dam Pram (FR) 1969	Fine Top (FR); 1949	Fine Art	Finnoise
Dam Pram (FR) 1969	Fine Top (FR); 1949	Toupie	Vatellor
Dam Pram (FR) 1969	Fine Top (FR); 1949	Toupie	Tarantella
Dam Pram (FR) 1969	Gourabe (FR); 1950	Admiral Drake	Craig an Eran
Dam Pram (FR) 1969	Gourabe (FR); 1950	Admiral Drake	Plucky Liege
Dam Pram (FR) 1969	Gourabe (FR); 1950	Godille	Godiche
Dam Pram (FR) 1969	Gourabe (FR); 1950	Godille	Captain's Fancy (Family 26)
