= Pearl Diver =

French Thoroughbred racehorse

- Sire: Vatellor
- Grandsire: Vatout
- Dam: Pearl Cap
- Damsire: Le Capucin
- Sex: Stallion
- Foaled: 1944
- Country: France
- Colour: Bay
- Breeder: Edward Esmond
- Owner: Geoffroy de Waldner
- Trainer: Percy Carter; Claude Halsey
- Record: 14: 4-1-1
- Earnings: £

Major wins
- Prix Matchem (1947); Epsom Derby (1947); Prix d'Harcourt (1948)

Pearl Diver (1944–1971) was a French Thoroughbred racehorse and sire. In a career which lasted from 1946 and 1948 he ran thirteen times and won four races. His most notable achievement came in 1947, when he became the first French-trained horse to win The Derby since Durbar in 1914.

== Background ==
Pearl Diver was bred in occupied France at Edward Esmond's Mortefontaine Stud in 1944. Esmond himself had fled the country for the United States in 1940 and the stud was being run by his son-in-law Baron Geoffroy de Waldner who faked the stud records to conceal the new foal's illustrious pedigree from the German authorities, giving him the pseudonym "Monsieur de Boscz". On Esmond's death in 1945, the yearling colt was inherited by de Waldner. As a two-year-old, Pearl Diver was sent into training at the Chantilly stable of Percy Carter, an Englishman who had been based in France for many years. Pearl Diver grew to be a big, powerful bay standing 16.2 hands high. Carter was responsible for the colt for all but a brief period in 1947, when he was stabled with Claude Halsey at Newmarket, Suffolk.

Pearl Diver’s sire, Vatellor was a high class racehorse who won eight races in France including the race now called the Prix Jean Prat. He later became a successful stallion being Champion sire in France in 1956 and getting such notable performers as My Love, Nikellora (Prix de l'Arc de Triomphe) and Vattel (Grand Prix de Paris). Pearl Cap had produced no notable horses before she gave birth to Pearl Diver in 1944. She had, however, been an outstanding racemare, with her victories including the 1931 Prix de l'Arc de Triomphe.

== Racing career ==
=== 1946: two-year-old season ===
Pearl Diver was not highly tried as a two-year-old, running twice. He showed some promise in winning the Prix Saint Patrick over 1400m.

=== 1947: three-year-old season ===
On his three-year-old debut Pearl Diver was beaten in a race at Le Tremblay by a filly called Imprudence. The form of the race looked better in retrospect as Imprudence went on to win the 1000 Guineas, the Poule d'Essai des Pouliches and The Oaks. Pearl Diver then finished third to L’Imperial in the Prix Jean Prat over 2000m at Longchamp. In May he recorded his first significant victory when he was awarded the Prix Matchem on the disqualification of Timor. His form suggested that he was a useful stayer (the Prix Matchem was run over 2700m), but below top class. In order to acclimatise the colt to English conditions, Pearl Diver was transferred to Newmarket three weeks before the Derby. Claude Halsey took charge of the colt’s final preparation at his Somerville Lodge Stable, and briefly became his official trainer. Despite this technicality, Carter is usually listed by most sources as Pearl Diver’s trainer for his run in the Derby

Pearl Diver started at odds of 40/1 at Epsom on a cold, wet day in front of an estimated 400,000 spectators including the King and Queen. The build-up to the race was dominated by Tudor Minstrel, the 4/7 favourite who came into the race unbeaten, having most recently won the 2000 Guineas by eight lengths. Ridden by Georges Bridgland, Pearl Diver raced prominently and tracked the leaders in the early stages as Gordon Richards struggled to restrain Tudor Minstrel before being forced to allow the favourite to make the running. When Tudor Minstrel weakened entering the straight, Pearl Diver moved up to overtake him and dispute the lead with Sayajirao. In the final quarter mile Pearl Diver went clear and pulled steadily away from the field to win by four lengths from Migoli with Sayajirao third. Many of the crowd began to celebrate a Tudor Minstrel victory, reportedly mistaking the similar white colours carried by Pearl Diver's jockey, but the defeat of the favourite saved the British bookmakers from an estimated £5,000,000 payout Bridgland said that once he took the lead he "knew the Derby was mine...I was never seriously challenged," while Baron de Waldner emphasised the importance of the soft ground, saying that he "enjoyed every minute of the rain."

The victory of the French colt was variously described in the British press as "a crushing blow", a "humiliation" and "a national tragedy". Explanations for the failure of the British included the "pampering" of horses in training, a lack of stamina in pedigrees and the use of inferior oats as feed during wartime.

At Longchamp the end of the month, Pearl Diver attempted to become the first Derby winner since Spearmint in 1906 to win the Grand Prix de Paris, but finished eighth behind the 34/1 winner Avenger. Pearl Diver was then off the racecourse for two and a half months before being sent back to England for the St Leger. He was unsuited by the firm ground and finished fourth of the eleven runners behind Sayajirao.

=== 1948: four-year-old season ===
Pearl Diver stayed in training at four and produced some good performances without recapturing the best his three-year-old form. He began the year with a win, taking the Prix d'Harcourt over 2150m at Longchamp in April. In June he returned to Epsom for the Coronation Cup, but ran disappointingly and finished unplaced behind Goyama. He remained in England for his next start and showed better form to finish third to Sayajirao in the Hardwicke Stakes at Royal Ascot. In September Pearl Diver finished third to Yong Lo in the Prix du Prince d'Orange at Longchamp. On his final start he was unplaced behind Migoli in the Prix de l'Arc de Triomphe.

== Assessment ==
In their book A Century of Champions, John Randall and Tony Morris rated Pearl Diver an “inferior” Derby winner, despite the fact that he had decisively beaten a stronger than average field at Epsom.

== Stud career ==
Pearl Diver began his stud career in England at the Limestone Stud in Lincolnshire. In 1957 he was sold and exported to Japan. He made little impact as a stallion in either country.

== Pedigree ==
Pedigree of Pearl Diver (FR), bay stallion, 1944
Sire Vatellor (FR) 1933	Vatout; 1926	Prince Chimay	Chaucer
Sire Vatellor (FR) 1933	Vatout; 1926	Prince Chimay	Gallorette*
Sire Vatellor (FR) 1933	Vatout; 1926	Vashti	Sans Souci
Sire Vatellor (FR) 1933	Vatout; 1926	Vashti	Vaya
Sire Vatellor (FR) 1933	Lady Elinor; 1919	Teddy	Ajax
Sire Vatellor (FR) 1933	Lady Elinor; 1919	Teddy	Rondeau
Sire Vatellor (FR) 1933	Lady Elinor; 1919	Madame Royale	Tarquin
Sire Vatellor (FR) 1933	Lady Elinor; 1919	Madame Royale	Royal Abbess
Dam Pearl Cap (GB) 1928	Le Capucin; 1920	Nimbus (FR)	Elf
Dam Pearl Cap (GB) 1928	Le Capucin; 1920	Nimbus (FR)	Nephte
Dam Pearl Cap (GB) 1928	Le Capucin; 1920	Carmen	Sidus
Dam Pearl Cap (GB) 1928	Le Capucin; 1920	Carmen	La Figlia
Dam Pearl Cap (GB) 1928	Pearl Maiden; 1918	Phaleron	Gallinule*
Dam Pearl Cap (GB) 1928	Pearl Maiden; 1918	Phaleron	Mrs Butterwick
Dam Pearl Cap (GB) 1928	Pearl Maiden; 1918	Seashell	Orme
Dam Pearl Cap (GB) 1928	Pearl Maiden; 1918	Seashell	Rydal Fell (Family: 16b)

* Pearl Diver is inbred 5S x 4D to the stallion Gallinule, meaning that he appears fifth generation (via Gallorette) on the sire side of his pedigree and fourth generation on the dam side of his pedigree.
