= Star Lift =

American thoroughbred racehorse

- Breed: Thoroughbred
- Sire: Mill Reef
- Grandsire: Never Bend
- Dam: Seneca
- Damsire: Chaparral
- Sex: Stallion
- Foaled: Apr 14,1984
- Country: Great Britain
- Breeder: Dayton Ltd.
- Owner: Wildenstein Stable
- Trainer: D. Wayne Lukas
- Jockey: Gary L. Stevens
- Record: 18:8-3-1
- Earnings: $572,421

Major wins
- Prix Royal-Oak (1988); Prix d'Harcourt (1989)

Star Lift (foaled Apr 14,1984) is a British Thoroughbred racehorse, winner of the 1988 Prix Royal-Oak.

== Career ==
Star Lift debuted on June 6, 1987, coming in at 4th place in Évry. On July 23, 1987, he won his first race at Saint-Cloud. In October 1988, he won at both Prix Scaramouche and Prix Royal-Oak. On April 30, 1989, he then won at Prix d'Harcourt. On September 17, 1989, he got his final win at Prix Foy, and finished up his career with a 9th place finish at Hollywood Turf Cup Stakes.

== Pedigree ==
Pedigree of Star Lift (GB), 1984
Sire Mill Reef (USA) 1968	Never Bend (USA); 1960	Nasrullah	Nearco
Sire Mill Reef (USA) 1968	Never Bend (USA); 1960	Nasrullah	Mumtaz Begum
Sire Mill Reef (USA) 1968	Never Bend (USA); 1960	Lalun	Djeddah
Sire Mill Reef (USA) 1968	Never Bend (USA); 1960	Lalun	Be Faithful
Sire Mill Reef (USA) 1968	Milan Mill (USA); 1962	Princequillo	Prince Rose
Sire Mill Reef (USA) 1968	Milan Mill (USA); 1962	Princequillo	Cosquilla
Sire Mill Reef (USA) 1968	Milan Mill (USA); 1962	Virginia Water	Count Fleet
Sire Mill Reef (USA) 1968	Milan Mill (USA); 1962	Virginia Water	Red Ray
Dam Seneca (FR) 1973	Chaparral (FR); 1966	Val de Loir	Vieux Manoir
Dam Seneca (FR) 1973	Chaparral (FR); 1966	Val de Loir	Vali
Dam Seneca (FR) 1973	Chaparral (FR); 1966	Niccolina	Niccolo dell'Arca
Dam Seneca (FR) 1973	Chaparral (FR); 1966	Niccolina	Light Sentence
Dam Seneca (FR) 1973	Schonbrunn(GER); 1966	Pantheon	Borealis
Dam Seneca (FR) 1973	Schonbrunn(GER); 1966	Pantheon	Palazzo
Dam Seneca (FR) 1973	Schonbrunn(GER); 1966	Scheherezade	Ticino
Dam Seneca (FR) 1973	Schonbrunn(GER); 1966	Scheherezade	Schwarzblaurot
