= Policeman (horse) =

French-bred Thoroughbred racehorse

- Sire: Riverman
- Grandsire: Never Bend
- Dam: Indianapolis
- Damsire: Barbare
- Sex: Stallion
- Foaled: 16 April 1977
- Country: France
- Colour: Bay
- Breeder: Frederick Tinsley
- Owner: Frederick Tinsley
- Trainer: Charles Milbank
- Record: 11: 3-0-4

Major wins
- Prix du Jockey-Club (1980)

Awards
- Timeform rating 124 (1980)

Policeman (16 April 1977 – 2001) was a French Thoroughbred racehorse and sire. He raced only as a three-year-old in 1980, when he won three of his eleven races including a 54/1 upset victory in the Prix du Jockey Club. He began his racing career at Cagnes-sur-Mer where he won two minor races before being transferred to the major French racecourses in spring. After finishing third in the Prix de Guiche and the Prix Matchem he won the Prix du Jockey Club with a front-running performance, defeating a field which included Shakapour, Providential and Argument. He went on to finish third in the Grand Prix de Saint-Cloud but ran poorly in his last two races and was retired to stud at the end of the year. Policeman was exported to stand as a breeding stallion in New York State but had little success as a sire of winners.

== Background ==
Policeman was a lengthy bay horse with a white star bred in France by his owner Frederick Tinsley. He was sired by Riverman an American-bred French-trained horse who won the Poule d'Essai des Poulains in 1972. As a breeding stallion he was highly successful, being the sire of many important winners including Irish River, Bahri, Gold River, River Memories, Detroit and Triptych. Policeman's dam Indianapolis failed to win a race but came from a good family, being a great-great-granddaughter of Myrobella, whose other descendants have included Big Game, Chamossaire and Snow Knight.

In 1976 Indianapolis, in foal to Riverman was sent to the Deauville sales and bought for ₣55,000 by Frederick Tinsley. Policeman was born the following April. The colt was sent into training with Charles Milbank at Chantilly.

== Racing career ==
=== 1980: three-year-old season ===
Unraced as a two-year-old, Policeman began his racing career in minor races at Cagnes-sur-Mer in early 1980. After finishing unplaced on his debut he won over 1600 metres, finished third on his next start and then won a race over 2000 metres. Later in spring he moved north to compete on the Parisian tracks and after finishing fourth over 2000 metres he was stepped up in class to contest the Prix de Guiche over 1950 metres a Longchamp Racecourse on 20 April. Ridden by Georges Doleuze he started at odds of 9/1 he finished third, beaten two lengths and a neck by Shakapour and Corvaro. Three weeks later he finished third behind Axios and Dip in the Prix Matchem over 1800 metres at Évry.

On 8 June, Policeman started the 54/1 outsider of a fourteen-runner field for the 143rd running of the Prix du Jockey Club over 2400 metres at Chantilly. Gonzales, the Irish-trained winner of the Gallinule Stakes, started favourite ahead of Providential, Mot d'Or (Prix Hocquart), Shakapour, Tom's Serenade, Argument, Belgio (Prix Lupin) and Dragon (Grand Critérium). Policeman was ridden by the Scottish jockey Willie Carson who was experiencing a remarkable run of success, having ridden Henbit to win The Derby on 4 June and Bireme to win The Oaks three days later. Policeman raced behind the pacemaker Hybrid before Carson sent him into clear lead at half-way and "waited for the others to attack". Several horses attempted to challenge in the straight, but Policeman never looked in any danger of defeat and won by one and a half lengths from Shakapour, with a gap of three lengths back to Providential in third.

Policeman was matched against older horses for the first time in the Grand Prix de Saint-Cloud over 2500 metres on 6 July. Carson repeated the tactics which had been successful at Chantilly, sending the colt into the lead at half-way, but in the straight the colt was overtaken 200 metres from the finish and finished third behind the dead-heaters Dunette and Shakapour. After a break of two months, Policeman returned in autumn but failed to reproduce his summer form, finishing last behind Prince Bee in the Prix Niel and fifteenth of the twenty runners in the Prix de l'Arc de Triomphe.

== Assessment ==
In the International Classification for 1980, Policeman was rated the eighth-best three-year-old colt in Europe, four pounds behind the top-rated Moorestyle. The independent Timeform organisation gave him a rating of 124, thirteen pounds inferior to Moorestyle, their Horse of the Year.

== Stud record ==
Policeman was retired from racing at the end of his three-year-old season. He was syndicated at a value of $4.4 million and exported to the United States to stand as a breeding stallion at Clermont Farm at Germantown, New York. Policeman was not a success as a sire, with the best of his progeny being Claramount, who won fourteen races in Mexico and the United States including the Grade II Boojum Handicap in 1988, and Rancher, who won the Queen Mother Memorial Cup in Hong Kong. He was also the damsire of the Breeders' Cup Sprint winner Reraise.

== Pedigree ==
Pedigree of Policeman (FR), bay stallion, 1977
| Sire Riverman (USA) 1969 | Never Bend (USA); 1960 | Nasrullah | Nearco |
| Sire Riverman (USA) 1969 | Never Bend (USA); 1960 | Nasrullah | Mumtaz Begum |
| Sire Riverman (USA) 1969 | Never Bend (USA); 1960 | Lalun | Djeddah |
| Sire Riverman (USA) 1969 | Never Bend (USA); 1960 | Lalun | Be Faithful |
| Sire Riverman (USA) 1969 | River Lady (USA); 1963 | Prince John | Princequillo |
| Sire Riverman (USA) 1969 | River Lady (USA); 1963 | Prince John | Not Afraid |
| Sire Riverman (USA) 1969 | River Lady (USA); 1963 | Nile Lily | Roman |
| Sire Riverman (USA) 1969 | River Lady (USA); 1963 | Nile Lily | Azalea |
| Dam Indianapolis (FR) 1969 | Barbare (FR); 1963 | Sicambre | Prince Bio |
| Dam Indianapolis (FR) 1969 | Barbare (FR); 1963 | Sicambre | Sif |
| Dam Indianapolis (FR) 1969 | Barbare (FR); 1963 | Barbara | Fair Trial |
| Dam Indianapolis (FR) 1969 | Barbare (FR); 1963 | Barbara | Mistress Ford |
| Dam Indianapolis (FR) 1969 | Iberide (GB); 1962 | Charlottesville | Prince Chevalier |
| Dam Indianapolis (FR) 1969 | Iberide (GB); 1962 | Charlottesville | Noorani |
| Dam Indianapolis (FR) 1969 | Iberide (GB); 1962 | Candytuft | Mossborough |
| Dam Indianapolis (FR) 1969 | Iberide (GB); 1962 | Candytuft | Cretan Belle (Family 6-e) |
