= Prix d'Harcourt =

Flat horse race in France

- Class: Group 2
- Location: Longchamp Racecourse; Paris, France
- Inaugurated: 1929
- Race type: Flat / Thoroughbred
- Website: france-galop.com

Race information
- Distance: 2,000 metres (1¼ miles)
- Surface: Turf
- Track: Right-handed
- Qualification: Four-years-old and up
- Weight: 57 kg Allowances; 1½ kg for fillies and mares Penalties; 3 kg for Group 1 winners * 1½ kg for Group 2 winners * * since 1 June last year
- Purse: €130,000 (2019); 1st: €74,100

Prix d'Harcourt
2025
Map Of Stars	Horizon Dore	Certain Lad

Previous years
2024
Zarakem	Horizon Dore	Birr Castle
2023
Simca Mille	Iresine	Kertez
2022
Skalleti	Sealiway	Mare Australis
2021
Skalleti	Mare Australis	Monty

2020-2011
2020
Shaman	Way To Paris	Simona
2019
Ghaiyyath	Soleil Marin	Intellogent
2018
Air Pilot	Royal Julius	Star Victory
2017
Cloth Of Stars	Mekhtaal	Maniaco
2016
Garlingari	Sumbal	Affaire Solitaire
2015
Al Kazeem	Affaire Solitaire	Fate
2014
Smoking Sun	Norse King	Triple Threat
2013
Maxios	Don Bosco	Saga Dream
2012
Giofra	Vadamar	Saga Dream
2011
Planteur	Ley Hunter	Agent Secret

2010–2001
2010
Cutlass Bay	Court Canibal	Celimene
2009
Trincot	The Bogberry	Vision D'Etat
2008
Loup Breton	Spirit One	Boris De Deauville
2007
Boris De Deauville	Pearl Sky	Irish Wells
2006
Manduro	Corre Caminos	Archange D'Or
2005
Delfos	Short Pause	Samando
2004
Vangelis	Execute	Short Pause
2003
Ana Marie	Fair Mix	Valentino
2002
Execute	Sunstrach	Poussin
2001
Earlene	Honorifique	Burning Sunset

2000–1990
2000
Indian Danehill	Chelsea Manor	Barbola
1999
Dark Moondancer	Barbola	Epistolaire
1998
Astarabad	Majorien	Taipan
1997
River Bay	Nero Zilzal	Baroud D'Honneur
1996
Valanour	Carling	Housamix
1995
Freedom Cry	Pelder	Tuesday's Special
1994
Urban Sea	Vert Amande	Marildo
1993
Marildo	Dear Doctor	Polytain
1992
Fortune's Wheel	Pistolet Bleu	Art Bleu
1991
Panoramic	Sikeston	Dear Doctor
1990
Creator	Rainibik	Young Mother

The Prix d'Harcourt is a Group 2 flat horse race in France open to thoroughbreds aged four years or older. It is run over a distance of 2,000 metres (about 1¼ miles) at Longchamp in April.

== History ==
The event is named in memory of Emmanuel d'Harcourt (1844–1928), a former president of the Société d'Encouragement. It was established in 1929, and was originally contested over 2,400 metres.

The Prix d'Harcourt was held at Auteuil in 1940, and at Maisons-Laffitte in 1943 and 1944. On the latter occasion its distance was 2,000 metres.

The race's distance was changed to 2,150 metres in 1946. It was cut to 2,100 metres in 1953, and to 2,000 metres in 1958. It reverted to 2,100 metres in 1961, and was extended to 2,200 metres in 1969.

The event was formerly staged a few weeks after the Prix Ganay. The dates of the two races were interchanged in 1971, and from this point the Prix d'Harcourt was run over 2,000 metres.

== Records ==
Most successful horse (2 wins):

- Amfortas – 1931, 1932
- Djebel – 1941, 1942
- Skalleti - 2021, 2022

Leading jockey (5 wins):

- Yves Saint-Martin – Regent (1960), Allez France (1974), Liloy (1976), Welsh Term (1983), Strawberry Road (1985)
- Maxime Guyon - Cutlass Bay (2010), Giofra (2012), Shaman (2020), Skalleti (2022), Zarakem (2024)

Leading trainer (10 wins):

- André Fabre – Saint Estephe (1986), Village Star (1988), Star Lift (1989), Creator (1990), Panoramic (1991), Freedom Cry (1995), Indian Danehill (2000), Manduro (2006), Cutlass Bay (2010), Cloth of Stars (2017)

Leading owner (6 wins):

- Daniel Wildenstein – Yelapa (1970), Allez France (1974), Liloy (1976), Grand Pavois (1987), Star Lift (1989), Freedom Cry (1995)

== Winners since 1980 ==
Year	Winner	Age	Jockey	Trainer	Owner	Time
1980	Three Troikas	4	Freddy Head	Criquette Head	Ghislaine Head	2:10.60
1981	Argument	4	Alain Lequeux	Maurice Zilber	Bruce McNall	2:14.50
1982	Lancastrian	5	Alain Lequeux	David Smaga	Sir Michael Sobell	2:13.10
1983	Welsh Term	4	Yves Saint-Martin	Robert Collet	Owen Helman	2:21.20
1984	Lovely Dancer	4	Alain Lequeux	Olivier Douieb	Jacki Clérico	2:17.30
1985	Strawberry Road	6	Yves Saint-Martin	Patrick Biancone	Ray Stehr	2:18.10
1986	Saint Estephe	4	Alfred Gibert	André Fabre	Yan Houyvet	2:11.60
1987	Grand Pavois	5	Tony Cruz	Patrick Biancone	Daniel Wildenstein	2:08.10
1988	Village Star	5	Cash Asmussen	André Fabre	Tony Richards	2:10.50
1989	Star Lift	5	Cash Asmussen	André Fabre	Daniel Wildenstein	2:10.10
1990	Creator	4	Cash Asmussen	André Fabre	Sheikh Mohammed	2:02.10
1991	Panoramic	4	Steve Cauthen	André Fabre	Sheikh Mohammed	2:05.80
1992	Fortune's Wheel	4	Mathieu Boutin	Robert Collet	Richard Strauss	2:10.40
1993	Marildo	6	Guy Guignard	David Smaga	David Smaga	2:07.70
1994	Urban Sea	5	Eric Saint-Martin	Jean Lesbordes	David Tsui	2:15.10
1995	Freedom Cry	4	Olivier Peslier	André Fabre	Daniel Wildenstein	2:12.10
1996	Valanour	4	Gérald Mossé	Alain de Royer-Dupré	HH Aga Khan IV	2:02.60
1997	River Bay	4	Thierry Jarnet	John Hammond	Ecurie Chalhoub	2:03.20
1998	Astarabad	4	Gérald Mossé	Alain de Royer-Dupré	HH Aga Khan IV	2:14.50
1999	Dark Moondancer	4	Gérald Mossé	Alain de Royer-Dupré	Ben Arbib	2:09.70
2000	Indian Danehill	4	Olivier Peslier	André Fabre	Edouard de Rothschild	2:13.90
2001	Earlene	4	Gérald Mossé	Henri-Alex Pantall	Sheikh Mohammed	2:17.80
2002	Execute	5	Thierry Gillet	John Hammond	Ecurie Chalhoub	2:03.50
2003	Ana Marie	4	Christophe Soumillon	Philippe Demercastel	Ecurie Bader	2:03.10
2004	Vangelis	5	Christophe Soumillon	Alain de Royer-Dupré	Herbert Guy	2:02.60
2005	Delfos	4	Miguel Blancpain	Carlos Laffon-Parias	Leonidas Marinopoulos	2:13.20
2006	Manduro	4	Stéphane Pasquier	André Fabre	Georg von Ullmann	2:01.40
2007	Boris de Deauville	4	Yann Barberot	Stéphane Wattel	Bryant / Haegel	2:13.40
2008	Loup Breton	4	Christophe Lemaire	Élie Lellouche	Ecurie Wildenstein	2:14.60
2009	Trincot	4	Stéphane Pasquier	Philippe Demercastel	Ecurie Bader	2:02.88
2010	Cutlass Bay	4	Maxime Guyon	André Fabre	Godolphin	2:03.86
2011	Planteur	4	Christophe Soumillon	Élie Lellouche	Ecurie Wildenstein	2:04.30
2012	Giofra	4	Maxime Guyon	Alain de Royer-Dupré	Haras de la Perelle	2:01.35
2013	Maxios	5	Stéphane Pasquier	Jonathan Pease	Niarchos Family	2:04.48
2014	Smoking Sun	5	Stéphane Pasquier	Pascal Bary	Niarchos Family	2:01.96
2015	Al Kazeem	7	Ryan Moore	Roger Charlton	John Deer	2:10.02
2016	Garlingari (Note: The 2016 & 2017 races took place at Chantilly while Longchamp was closed for redevelopment)	5	Stéphane Pasquier	Corine Barande-Barbe	Corine Barande-Barbe	2:07.03
2017	Cloth of Stars	4	Mickael Barzalona	André Fabre	Godolphin	1:58.77
2018	Air Pilot	9	Christophe Soumillon	Ralph Beckett	Lady Cobham	2:14.58
2019	Ghaiyyath	4	William Buick	Charlie Appleby	Godolphin	2:02.87
2020	Shaman	4	Maxime Guyon	Carlos Laffon-Parias	Wertheimer et Frère	2:06.68
2021	Skalleti	6	Gerald Mosse	Jerome Reynier	Jean-Claude Seroul	2:11.04
2022	Skalleti	7	Maxime Guyon	Jerome Reynier	Jean-Claude Seroul	2:08.73
2023	Simca Mille	4	Alexis Pouchin	Stephane Wattel	Haras De La Perelle & Stephane Wattel	2:03.39
2024	Zarakem	4	Maxime Guyon	Jerome Reynier	Ecurie Benaroussi Sofiane	2:14.39
2025	Map Of Stars	4	James Doyle	Francis-Henri Graffard	Wathnan Racing	2:05.20
2026	Bright Picture	5	Maxime Guyon	André Fabre	Wertheimer et Frère	2:04.29

== Earlier winners ==
- 1929: Guy Fawkes
- 1930: Florio
- 1931: Amfortas
- 1932: Amfortas
- 1933: Taxodium
- 1934: Assuerus
- 1935: Mary Tudor
- 1936: Bouillon
- 1937: Le Duc
- 1938: Victrix
- 1939: Canot
- 1940: Ksar El Srir
- 1941: Djebel
- 1942: Djebel
- 1943: Tifinar
- 1944: Un Gaillard
- 1945: Priam
- 1946: Oubanghi
- 1947: Yong Lo
- 1948: Pearl Diver
- 1949: Goody
- 1950: Violoncelle
- 1951: Alizier
- 1952: Piqu'avant
- 1953: Faubourg
- 1954: Gerocourt
- 1955: Mahan
- 1956: Tropique
- 1957: Tapioca
- 1958: Tanerko
- 1959: Franc Luron
- 1960: Regent
- 1961: Drago
- 1962: Vienna
- 1963: Tang
- 1964: Trac
- 1965: Frontin
- 1966: Sigebert
- 1967: Cadmus
- 1968: Carmarthen
- 1969: Grandier
- 1970: Yelapa
- 1971: Caro
- 1972: Pistol Packer
- 1973: Toujours Pret
- 1974: Allez France
- 1975: Card King
- 1976: Liloy
- 1977: Kasteel
- 1978: Monseigneur
- 1979: Trillion

== See also ==
- List of French flat horse races
