= Bavarian Classic =

German horse race

- Class: Group 2
- Location: Munich Racecourse; Munich, Germany
- Inaugurated: 1969
- Race type: Flat / Thoroughbred
- Sponsor: oneXtwo.com
- Website: Munich

Race information
- Distance: 2,000 metres (1¼ miles)
- Surface: Turf
- Track: Left-handed
- Qualification: Three-year-olds
- Weight: 58 kg Allowances; 1½ kg for fillies
- Purse: €70,000 (2026); 1st: €40,000

The Bavarian Classic is a Group 2 flat horse race in Germany open to three-year-old thoroughbreds. It is run at Munich over a distance of 2,000 metres (about 1¼ miles), and it is scheduled to take place each year in early May.

== History ==
The event was established in 1969, and the inaugural running was titled the Preis des Kaufhauses Hertie. It became known as the Grosser Hertie-Preis in 1970, and for a period its distance ranged from 1,850 to 2,200 metres. It was given Group 2 status in 1977, and from this point it was regularly contested over 2,200 metres.

The race was known as the Grosser Müller-Brot-Preis from 1997, and it was cut to 2,000 metres in 1998. It was downgraded to Group 3 level and renamed the Bavarian Classic in 2004. Prior to 2016 it was usually run in late May or early June, but is now regularly contested on 1 May.

== Records ==
Leading jockey (6 wins):
- Andrzej Tylicki – Machtvogel (1981), Apollonios (1984), Acatenango (1985), El Salto (1986), Obando (1988), Ajano (1997)

Leading trainer (10 wins):

- Heinz Jentzsch – Boris (1972), Nicandro (1980), Anno (1982), Ocos (1983), Apollonios (1984), Acatenango (1985), El Salto (1986), Obando (1988), Monsun (1993), Vialli (1994)

== Winners ==
Year	Winner	Jockey	Trainer	Time
1969	Traminer	Oskar Langner	Sven von Mitzlaff	2:16.40
1970	Segnes	Harald Ziese	W. Hessler	2:29.10
1971	Wanderu	Peter Alafi	Bruno Schütz	2:19.90
1972	Boris	Fritz Drechsler	Heinz Jentzsch	2:24.80
1973	Athenagoras	Harro Remmert	Sven von Mitzlaff	1:55.50
1974	Daus	John Gorton	E. Petri	2:09.90
1975	Harris	Raimund Prinzinger	Oskar Langner	1:59.80
1976	Prairie Bird	Raimund Prinzinger	Horst Degner	1:58.20
1977	Broadway	Edward Hide	Klaus Heinke	2:22.50
1978	Rodaun	Luigi Auriemma	Herbert Block	2:22.80
1979	Windlauf	Otto Gervai	Charly Seiffert	2:16.50
1980	Nicandro	Ralf Suerland	Heinz Jentzsch	2:19.70
1981	Machtvogel	Andrzej Tylicki	Wilfried Schütz	2:22.80
1982	Anno	Georg Bocskai	Heinz Jentzsch	2:23.00
1983	Ocos	Georg Bocskai	Heinz Jentzsch	2:18.50
1984	Apollonios	Andrzej Tylicki	Heinz Jentzsch	2:17.00
1985	Acatenango	Andrzej Tylicki	Heinz Jentzsch	2:17.50
1986	El Salto	Andrzej Tylicki	Heinz Jentzsch	2:22.80
1987	Le Glorieux	Jean-Luc Kessas	Robert Collet	2:28.80
1988	Obando	Andrzej Tylicki	Heinz Jentzsch	2:16.36
1989	Oldham	Georg Bocskai	Uwe Ostmann	2:24.14
1990	Buenos	Mark Rimmer	Bruno Schütz	2:24.69
1991	Malmsey	Steve Cauthen	André Fabre	2:24.82
1992	Captain Horatius	John Reid	John Dunlop	2:17.79
1993	Monsun	Peter Schiergen	Heinz Jentzsch	2:17.35
1994	Vialli	Stephen Eccles	Heinz Jentzsch	2:19.10
1995	O'Connor	Andreas Boschert	Andreas Wöhler	2:22.90
1996	Mongol Warrior	David Harrison	Lord Huntingdon	2:30.80
1997	Ajano (Note: Caitano finished first in 1997, but he was relegated to second place following a stewards' inquiry)	Andrzej Tylicki	Hans-Jürgen Gröschel	2:23.40
1998	Tiger Hill	Billy Newnes	Peter Schiergen	2:06.20
1999	Acambaro	Torsten Mundry	Peter Rau	2:10.50
2000	Samum	Andrasch Starke	Andreas Schütz	2:09.80
2001	Zöllner	Jimmy Quinn	Peter Schiergen	2:10.00
2002	Belcore	Andreas Boschert	Andreas Wöhler	2:09.20
2003	Ransom O'War	Stanley Chin	Erika Mäder	2:07.74
2004	Fight Club	Andrasch Starke	Andreas Schütz	2:11.64
2005	Arcadio	Terence Hellier	Peter Schiergen	2:07.06
2006	Imonso	Andreas Suborics	Peter Schiergen	2:16.24
2007	Persian Storm	Terence Hellier	Jens Hirschberger	2:13.60
2008	Walzertraum	Terence Hellier	Jens Hirschberger	2:12.39
2009	Saphir	Andrasch Starke	Peter Schiergen	2:06.60
2010	Scalo	Gaetan Masure	Andreas Wöhler	2:09.71
2011	Mawingo	Fredrik Johansson	Jens Hirschberger	2:07.18
2012	Pakal	Karoly Kerekes	Wolfgang Figge	2:05.27
2013	Lucky Speed	Andrasch Starke	Peter Schiergen	2:15.17
2014	Magic Artist	David Probert	Wolfgang Figge	2:07.83
2015	Quasillo (Note: The 2015 race was run at Hannover Racecourse)	Eduardo Pedroza	Andreas Wöhler	2:08.36
2016	Isfahan	Eduardo Pedroza	Andreas Wöhler	2:11.21
2017	Warring States	Harry Bentley	Andreas Wöhler	2:14.60
2018	Royal Youmzain	Eduardo Pedroza	Andreas Wöhler	2:08.91
2019	Django Freeman	Lukas Delozier	Henk Grewe	2:12.61
	no race 2020 (Note: The 2020 running was cancelled because of the COVID-19 pandemic in Germany)
2021	Lambo	Adrie de Vries	Miroslav Rulec	2:16.57
2022	Lavello	Adrie de Vries	Markus Klug	2:11.14
2023	Mr Hollywood	Lukas Delozier	Henk Grewe	2:15.81
2024	Wilko	Leon Wolff	Henk Grewe	2:05.73
2025	Path Of Soldier	Eddy Hardouin	P Schiergen	2:06.42
2026	Gostam	Eduardo Pedroza	Andreas Wöhler	2:07.77

== See also ==
- List of German flat horse races
- Recurring sporting events established in 1969 – this race is included under its former title, Grosser Hertie-Preis.
