= Argument (horse) =

French-bred Thoroughbred racehorse (b. 1977)

- Sire: Kautokeino
- Grandsire: Relko
- Dam: Arantelle
- Damsire: Tapioca
- Sex: Stallion
- Foaled: 7 February 1977
- Country: France
- Colour: Bay
- Breeder: Pierre Ribes
- Owner: Mrs P. Ribes; Berry Gordy & Bruce McNall
- Trainer: John Cunnington Jr. Maurice Zilber
- Record: 20: 6-4-1

Major wins
- Grand Prix Prince Rose (1980); Washington, D.C. International Stakes (1980); Prix d'Harcourt (1981); Prix Ganay (1981)

Awards
- Top-rated French racehorse (1980); Timeform best middle-distance horse (1980); Timeform rating: 133 (1980), 129 (1981)
- Last updated on 13 March 2025

Argument (7 February 1977 – after 1996) was a French Thoroughbred racehorse and sire. In his early racing career he showed consistent form and was placed in several important races, but showed marked improvement in the autumn of 1980. He was considered an unlucky loser when narrowly beaten in the Prix de l'Arc de Triomphe and then travelled to the United States where he won the Washington, D.C. International Stakes. At the end of the year he was officially the best racehorse trained in France. In the following spring he won the Prix d'Harcourt and Prix Ganay but his form deteriorated thereafter and he was beaten in his remaining six races. He made no impact as a sire of winners.

== Background ==
Argument was a dark-coated bay horse with a white coronet on his right hind foot bred in France by Pierre Ribes. Argument was by far the best horse sired by Kautokeino, who won the Prix Juigné on his debut before his racing career was ended by injury when finishing third to Sassafras in the 1970 Prix La Force. He was one of at least five winners produced by the mare Arantelle. The colt raced in the colours of his breeders' wife and was sent into training with John Cunnington Jr. at Chantilly.

== Racing career ==
=== 1979: two-year-old season ===
After winning a race over 1200 metres on his racecourse debut, Argument was moved up in class and distance for the group Three Prix La Rochette over 1600m at Longchamp Racecourse on 2 September. Ridden by Jean-Claude Desaint, he started the 9/4 second favourite and finished second, beaten a neck by Un Reitre, with the future Grand Critérium winner Dragon two lengths away in third place. Two weeks later he started second favourite for the Prix des Chênes over the same course and distance but finished fourth behind In Fijar.

=== 1980: three-year-old season ===
Argument began his second season by winning the Prix Mary over 1600m at Saint-Cloud Racecourse in April. He was then moved up to Group One class for the first time for the Poule d'Essai des Poulains. Starting at odds of 13/1 he finished fourth behind In Fijar, Moorestyle and Ruscelli, but was promoted to third when Ruscelli was disqualified for causing interference. Argument was moved up in distance for the Prix Lupin over 2100m at Longchamp on 18 May. He started a 21/1 outsider and finished second, beaten half a length by Belgio, with In Fijar in third. In the Prix du Jockey-Club at Chantilly Racecourse on 8 June, Argument produced his worst effort of the season as he finished last of the fourteen runners behind the 54/1 outsider Policeman. On 21 July Argument was sent to Belgium for the Grand Prix Prince Rose over 2200m at Ostend and won the race by two lengths from Dhausli and Strong Gale. He returned to France in August for the Prix de la Côte Normande over 2000m in which he was beaten a head by Glenorum, to whom he was conceding nine pounds. He then traveled to Germany for the Grosser Preis von Baden in which he finished fifth behind Nebos: Desaint was fined by the local racecourse stewards for his riding performance in a rough and slowly run race.

On 5 October, Argument started a 74/1 outsider in a field of twenty for France's most prestigious race, the Prix de l'Arc de Triomphe over 2400m at Longchamp. Desaint employed exaggerated waiting tactics and Argument turned into the straight fifteen lengths behind the leader Ela-Mana-Mou. Under a vigorous ride from Desaint, Argument made rapid progress in the last 400 metres, overtaking horse after horse before catching Ela-Mana-Mou in the final strides to finish second, half a length behind the filly Detroit. In their annual Racechorses of 1980, the independent Timeform organisation described him as an unlucky loser who would have won had he not been given so much ground to make up. After his run in the Arc, Argument was bought privately (for a sum reported to be "in excess of $1 million"), by the partnership of Bruce McNall and Berry Gordy and was transferred to the stable of Maurice Zilber. His new owners accepted an invitation for the colt to represent France in the Washington, D.C. International at Laurel Park Racecourse on 8 November when he was ridden for the first time by Lester Piggott. Zilber expressed his confidence before the race, describing the colt as "a champion ... he has everything". Starting the 2.4/1 favourite, Argument raced in mid-division before moving forward approaching the final turn. He accelerated into the lead a furlong from the finish and won by almost two lengths from the American mare The Very One. A protest lodged against the winner by The Very One's rider, Jorge Velásquez, was rejected by the racecourse stewards.

=== 1981: four-year-old season ===
Alain Lequeux took over as Argument's jockey in 1981 and rode him to success in his first two races. On his seasonal debut at Longhcamp in April he produced a strong finish to win the 2000m Prix d'Harcourt by a head from Katowice, with Detroit in fourth. Argument started favourite for the Group One Prix Ganay at the same course on 3 May, and produced an impressive performance, sprinting clear of the field and winning by three lengths from Armistice Day and In Fijar. Argument never won again. He failed in two races at Saint-Cloud, being disqualified after finishing third in the Prix Jean de Chaudenay and then sweating up badly before running unplaced behind Akarad in the Grand Prix de Saint-Cloud.

On 30 August, Argument was sent to Chicago to represent France in the inaugural running of the Arlington Million, then the world's most valuable horse race, and finished sixth behind John Henry. Argument's final European race came in the Prix de l'Arc de Triomphe on 4 October when he started at odds on 34/1 and made steady progress in the straight to finish sixth in a field of twenty-four runners behind Gold River. For his final two races, Argument competed in North America, finishing fourth behind Open Call in the Canadian International Stakes and seventh to Providential in the Hollywood Turf Cup.

== Assessment ==
In the official French rating for two-year-olds in 1979, Argument was rated ten pounds inferior to the top-rated Dragon, a colt he had beaten in the Prix la Rochette. In the following year, Timeform rated Argument on 133 (four pounds below the sprinter Moorestyle) and named him the season's best middle-distance horse. In the official International Classification he was rated the best horse trained in France and equal-second among all European racehorses, level with Ela-Mana-Mou and one pound below Moorestyle. In the following year he was given a rating of 129 by Timeform and was rated six pounds behind the top-rated older horse Northjet in the International Classification.

== Stud record ==
Argument was retired from racing to become a breeding stallion in the United States, before later returning to France. He was not a success, siring few winners, none of them in the highest class. His last reported foals were born in 1997.

== Pedigree ==
Pedigree of Argument (FR), bay stallion, 1977
Sire Kautokeino (FR) 1967	Relko (GB); 1960	Tanerko	Tantieme
Sire Kautokeino (FR) 1967	Relko (GB); 1960	Tanerko	La Divine
Sire Kautokeino (FR) 1967	Relko (GB); 1960	Relance	Relic
Sire Kautokeino (FR) 1967	Relko (GB); 1960	Relance	Polaire
Sire Kautokeino (FR) 1967	Cranberry (GB); 1957	Aureole	Hyperion
Sire Kautokeino (FR) 1967	Cranberry (GB); 1957	Aureole	Angelola
Sire Kautokeino (FR) 1967	Cranberry (GB); 1957	Big Berry	Big Game
Sire Kautokeino (FR) 1967	Cranberry (GB); 1957	Big Berry	Red Briar
Dam Arantelle (FR) 1966	Tapioca (FR); 1953	Vandale	Plassy
Dam Arantelle (FR) 1966	Tapioca (FR); 1953	Vandale	Vanille
Dam Arantelle (FR) 1966	Tapioca (FR); 1953	Semoule d'Or	Vatellor
Dam Arantelle (FR) 1966	Tapioca (FR); 1953	Semoule d'Or	Semoule Fine
Dam Arantelle (FR) 1966	Neptune's Doll (FR); 1960	Neptune	Crafty Admiral
Dam Arantelle (FR) 1966	Neptune's Doll (FR); 1960	Neptune	Timely Tune
Dam Arantelle (FR) 1966	Neptune's Doll (FR); 1960	Dzena	Tornado
Dam Arantelle (FR) 1966	Neptune's Doll (FR); 1960	Dzena	Doria (Family:12-b)
