= Le Glorieux =

British-bred Thoroughbred racehorse

- Sire: Cure The Blues
- Grandsire: Stop The Music
- Dam: La Mirande
- Damsire: Le Fabuleux
- Sex: Stallion
- Foaled: February 18, 1984
- Died: Aug 19, 2010
- Country: Great Britain
- Colour: Bay
- Breeder: Petra Bloodstock Agency Ltd.
- Owner: Werner Wolf
- Trainer: Robert Collet
- Record: 19: 6–6–1
- Earnings: € 1,451,728

Major wins
- Bavarian Classic (1987); Grosser Preis von Berlin (1987); Frühjahrs Dreijährigen-Preis (1987); Japan Cup (1987); Washington, D.C. International (1987)

Awards
- German Champion Three-Year-Old Colt (1987)

Le Glorieux (18 February 1984 – 19 Aug 2010) was a British-bred, French-trained Thoroughbred racehorse. In 1987, he achieved the remarkable feat of racing in five countries and winning three Grade 1 races on three different continents. His victories came in the Grosser Preis von Berlin in Europe, the Washington, D.C. International in North America, and the Japan Cup in Asia. He became only the second British-bred horse to win the Japan Cup and, until Calandagan's victory in 2025, remained the only French-trained winner of the race for nearly 40 years.

As a two-year-old in 1986, Le Glorieux won his first race in December after several placed finishes in France. The following year, he established himself as one of Germany's leading three-year-olds, winning the G3 Frühjahrs Dreijährigen-Preis, G2 Grosser Hertie-Preis, and G1 Grosser Preis von Berlin. Although he struggled in the Prix du Jockey Club, his strong campaign in Germany earned him the title of Champion Three-Year-Old there.

Later that year, Le Glorieux travelled to the United States, where he finished second to Theatrical in the Man o' War Stakes. He then won the G1 Washington, D.C. International at Laurel Park, defeating a field of 14 international runners. From there, he continued to Japan for the Japan Cup, where he defeated Moon Madness, Southjet, and Dyna Actress in record time.

Le Glorieux returned to racing in 1988 but finished fifth in the G1 Tancred Stakes in Australia. He sustained an injury during the race and was subsequently retired. He won 10 of his 24 starts, including three G1 races. In 1989, he entered stud at Haras du Mézeray in France, where he found small success as a sire.

== Background ==
Le Glorieux was a bay horse with a white star and two uneven white pasterns on his hind legs, bred by Lady Chryss O'Reily's Petra Bloodstock Agency. As a yearling, he was sold at the Highflyer Sales for 41,000 guineas to Sieglinde Wolf, the wife of German businessman, Werner Wolf, and trained by Robert Collet at Chantilly Racecourse. He was ridden by Alain Lequeux in most of his races.

Racing silks of Werner Wolf

Le Glorieux was sired by Cure The Blues, a winner of the G1 Laurel Futurity in 1980 and a successful stallion who also sired Wake at Noon, Incurable Optimist, and Proven Cure. Le Glorieux's dam, La Mirande, won two of her eight starts and would also later on foal La Tritona.

== Racing Career ==
=== 1986: two year old season ===
Le Glorieux made his racing debut on August 25 at Deauville in the Prix de Caen, finishing second to Trempolino. He would then place second again in the Prix de Blaison on September 10 before finishing seventh in his first graded race, the Grade 3 Prix des Chênes, on September 28, both races taking place at Longchamp.

On October 10 at Maisons-Laffitte, Le Glorieux finished fourth in the Listed Prix Herbager, behind the eventual 1988 Japan Cup winner Pay the Butler, who finished third. The two horses met again the following month in the Prix Mieuxce at Saint-Cloud on November 7, where Le Glorieux finished eighth of 18 runners, with Pay the Butler finishing fourth. Afterwards on November 28, Le Glorieux finished second in the Prix Soritor.

He finally won his first race on December 6 in the Prix Prompt, where he defeated a field of 15 runners.

=== 1987: three year old season ===
Le Glorieux began his three-year-old season on March 20 in the Prix Or du Rhin, finishing second. He returned to France on April 12 for the Listed Prix de Courcelles, where he finished third behind Trempolino. The latter would go on to win the Prix de l'Arc de Triomphe later that year and finish second to Theatrical in the Breeders' Cup Turf.

Le Glorieux then travelled to Germany, where he established himself among the country's leading three-year-olds. On April 26 at Frankfurt, he won the Grade 3 Frühjahrs Dreijährigen-Preis, earning his first victory at graded level. Followed by another victory in the Grade 2 Grosser Hertie-Preis on May 17. He returned to France for the Prix du Jockey Club on June 7, finishing 11th of 17 runners, this proved to be his final start in France. Returning to Germany, he won the Grosser Preis von Berlin at Düsseldorf on June 26, winning his first Grade 1 race. His winning streak came to an end in the Grosser Preis von Baden on September 6, where he finished fourth. Acatenango won the race, with Moon Madness finishing second. Acatenango would later become an important sire, most notably producing Lando, the winner of the 1995 Japan Cup. Le Glorieux subsequently finished second in the Preis von Europa and, on the strength of his German campaign, was named Champion Three-Year-Old in Germany.

Following his season in Europe, Le Glorieux travelled to the United States for two major international turf races. His American debut came in the Man o' War Stakes at Aqueduct on October 24, where he faced Theatrical. Theatrical controlled much of the race before pulling away in the stretch to win by 2½ lengths. Le Glorieux, who had raced prominently throughout, overtook Midnight Cousins in the final sixteenth to finish second. Despite the defeat, his performance was notable since he was the only other Grade I winner in the field besides Theatrical, and his previous Grade I success had come in Germany. Le Glorieux's jockey, Alain Lequeux, praised Theatrical's performance, saying, ''The winner was the best, He's a good horse. My horse ran his race. No excuses.''

Le Glorieux's runner-up finish also set the stage for his next start, the Washington, D.C. International at Laurel Park, one week later on October 31. The race attracted an unusually international field of 14 runners representing seven countries, including Gjatsk, the first Soviet entrant in the event since 1966. Le Glorieux settled well back early before beginning his move through the field. In the stretch, Hall of Fame jockey Laffit Pincay Jr. kept him along the rail and guided him through a narrow opening, allowing him to close rapidly on the front-running Great Communicator. Le Glorieux caught him in the closing strides and won by a neck, winning his first victory outside Europe and his second Grade 1 victory. His trainer, Robert Collet, had also already gathered considerable success bringing European horses to North America, most notably with Last Tycoon, who had won the Breeders' Cup Mile the previous year.

Le Glorieux's international campaign continued when he was invited to compete in the 1987 Japan Cup at Tokyo Racecourse. He entered the race as a replacement for the French-trained Sadjiyd, who withdrew, and faced a strong field that included Southjet, Dyna Actress, Triptych, Legend Teio, and Moon Madness once again.

During the race, Moon Madness went to the front while Le Glorieux settled just behind the leaders. Legend Teio challenged for the lead, but Le Glorieux held his position and remained within striking distance. Entering the final straight, he began to close on Moon Madness and took command with over 200 meters remaining. Le Glorieux then had to withstand strong challenges from Southjet and Dyna Actress in the closing stages, but he held on to win the Japan Cup in a record time of 2:24.9. Le Glorieux became the first French-trained horse to win the Japan Cup and the second British-bred horse to do so, following Jupiter Island's victory in the race the previous year.

=== 1988: four year old season ===
On March 26, 1988, as a four-year-old, Le Glorieux travelled to Australia to contest the Tancred Stakes, a Grade 1 race at Rosehill Racecourse in Sydney. The field included Highland Chieftain and Vaguely Pleasant, but Le Glorieux finished fifth behind the winner, Beau Zam. The race would also prove to be the final start of his racing career, since Le Glorieux sustained an injury during the race and was in turn retired from competition.

== Stud Record ==
Le Glorieux entered stud in 1989 at Haras du Mézeray in France. Although he never achieved the same level of prominence as a sire that he had enjoyed on the racetrack, he produced a number of notable offspring. Among them were the German Grade 2 winning miler Up And Away and Glorieux Dancer, along with other successful progeny including Glorioso, Le Magnifico, Fort Commander, Buck's Dream, and Dionello.

Le Glorieux remained at stud for a decade before being retired from breeding in 1999. He spent his final years at his owner Werner Wolf's Haras du Logis Saint-Germain in Normandy, France, passing away on August 19, 2010, at the age of 26.

== Pedigree ==
Pedigree of Le Glorieux (GB), bay stallion, 1984
Sire Cure The Blues	Stop The Music	Hail To Reason	Turn-To
Sire Cure The Blues	Stop The Music	Hail To Reason	Nothirdchance
Sire Cure The Blues	Stop The Music	Bebopper	Tom Fool
Sire Cure The Blues	Stop The Music	Bebopper	Bebop
Sire Cure The Blues	Quick Cure	Dr. Fager	Rougn'n Tumble
Sire Cure The Blues	Quick Cure	Dr. Fager	Aspidistra
Sire Cure The Blues	Quick Cure	Speedwell	Bold Ruler
Sire Cure The Blues	Quick Cure	Speedwell	Imperatrice
Dam La Mirande	Le Fabuleux	Wild Risk	Rialto
Dam La Mirande	Le Fabuleux	Wild Risk	Wild Violet
Dam La Mirande	Le Fabuleux	Anguar	Verso
Dam La Mirande	Le Fabuleux	Anguar	La Rochelle
Dam La Mirande	La Magnanarelle	Herbager	Vandale
Dam La Mirande	La Magnanarelle	Herbager	Flagette
Dam La Mirande	La Magnanarelle	La Malaguena	Migoli
Dam La Mirande	La Magnanarelle	La Malaguena	La Mirambule
