= Nimbus (French horse) =

French-bred Thoroughbred racehorse

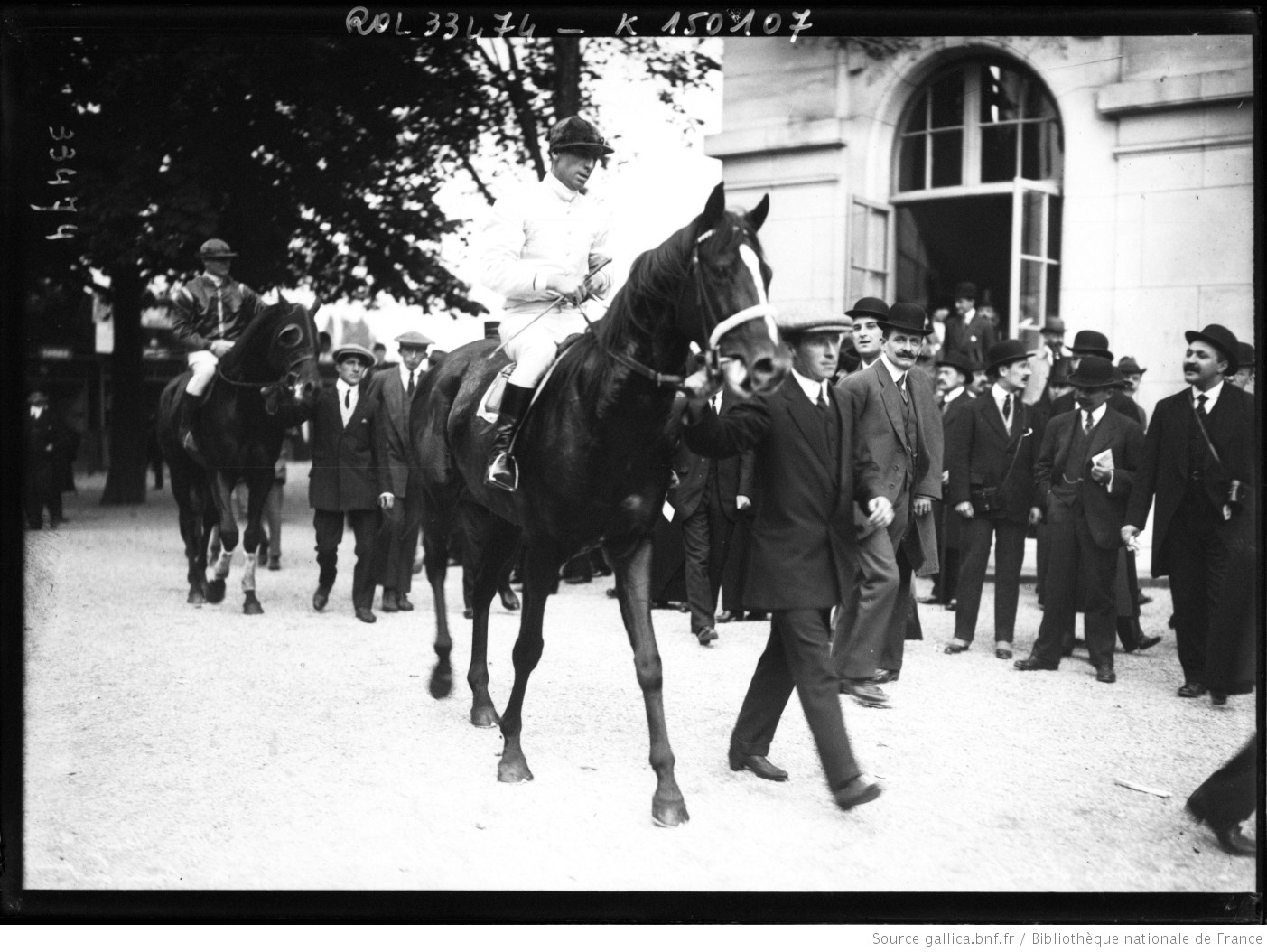
- October 5, 1913, at Longchamp
- Sire: Elf
- Grandsire: Upas
- Dam: Nephte
- Damsire: Flying Fox
- Sex: Stallion
- Foaled: 1910
- Country: France
- Colour: Bay
- Breeder: Edmond Blanc
- Trainer: George Cunnington, Sr.
- Record: not found
- Earnings: not found

Major wins
- Prix Greffulhe (1913); La Coupe d'Or (1913); Prix du Conseil Municipal (1913); Prix des Sablons (1914); Prix Biennal (1914); Prix Boiard (1914); Prix du Cadran (1914)
- Last updated on September 6, 2008

Nimbus (foaled 1910) was a French Thoroughbred racehorse whose damsire was the 1899 British Triple Crown Champion, Flying Fox. Nimbus was owned and raced by leading French horseman Alexandre Aumont of Haras de Victot in Victot-Pontfol, Calvados.

One of several horses named Nimbus, he is designated as Nimbus "II" in accordance with his birth year. Trained by George Cunnington, Sr. at Chantilly, he was a multiple stakes winner in France.

As a sire, Nimbus notably produced Le Capucin whose wins included the 1923 Prix du Jockey Club and the 1924 Grand International d'Ostende.

== Sire line tree ==
- Nimbus
  - Rubioso
  - Keror
  - Cerfeuil
    - Roi De Paris
  - Le Capucin
    - Aforto
  - Cloudbank
  - Felton
    - Henin
    - Treignac
