= Le Capucin =

French-bred Thoroughbred racehorse

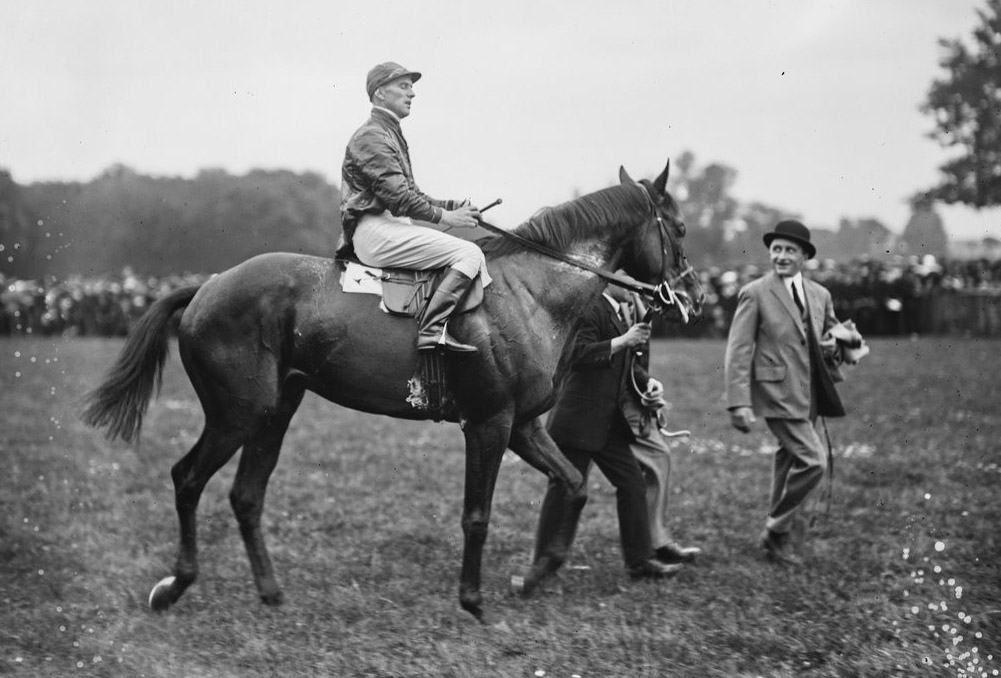
- Le Capucin, winner of the prix du Jockey Club in 1923 (Chantilly)
- Sire: Nimbus
- Grandsire: Elf
- Dam: Carmen
- Damsire: Sidus
- Country: France
- Breeder: A. Aumont
- Record: 12 (6–5–1)

Major wins
- Prix du Jockey Club (1923); Grand International d'Ostende (1924)

Le Capuchin (1920) is a racehorse who won the Prix du Jockey Club June 10, 1923 at the Chantilly Racecourse and the Grand International d'Ostende at Ostend racecourse, Belgium, in 1924.

== Palmarès ==
- 1925 Prix Boiard
- 1924 Grand International d'Ostende
- 1924 Prix des Maréchaux
- 1924 Grand International d'Ostende
- 1923 Prix du Jockey Club
- 1923 Prix Daru

== Pedigree ==
Pedigree of Le Capucin
| Sire Nimbus | Elf | Upas | Dollar |
| Sire Nimbus | Elf | Upas | Rosemary |
| Sire Nimbus | Elf | Analogy | Adventurer |
| Sire Nimbus | Elf | Analogy | Mandragora |
| Sire Nimbus | Nephte | Flying Fox | Orme |
| Sire Nimbus | Nephte | Flying Fox | Vampire |
| Sire Nimbus | Nephte | Fanny | Isonomy |
| Sire Nimbus | Nephte | Fanny | Frivola |
| Dam Carmen | Sidus | St. Simon | Galopin |
| Dam Carmen | Sidus | St. Simon | Saint Angela |
| Dam Carmen | Sidus | Star of Fortune | Hermit |
| Dam Carmen | Sidus | Star of Fortune | Stella |
| Dam Carmen | La Figlia | Saraband | Muncaster |
| Dam Carmen | La Figlia | Saraband | Highland Fling |
| Dam Carmen | La Figlia | Vivandière | Hampton |
| Dam Carmen | La Figlia | Vivandière | Lady Kars |

== See also ==
- Illustration on Gallica
