= Alain Lequeux =

French jockey

Personal information
- Born: 1947 France
- Died: 26 April 2006 (aged 58–59)
- Occupation: Jockey

Horse racing career
- Sport: Horse racing
- Career wins: 2,000+

Major racing wins
- Prix de la Forêt (1963, 1977, 1978, 1979, 1984); Poule d'Essai des Pouliches (1974); Prix du Moulin de Longchamp (1978); Prix Jacques Le Marois (1980, 1990); Prix d'Ispahan (1980, 1981, 1982); Prix de l'Opéra (1980); Prix Marcel Boussac (1980, 1984, 1988); Prix Ganay (1981, 1983); Prix Lupin (1984, 1985); Grand Criterium (1985); Critérium de Saint-Cloud (1987); Prix Saint-Alary (1989) French Classic Race wins: Grand Prix de Paris (1978) International race wins: Yellow Ribbon Stakes (1980); Washington, D.C. International Stakes (1981); Hollywood Turf Cup Stakes (1981); E. P. Taylor Stakes (1983); Turf Classic (1985); Deutschland-Preis (1987); Japan Cup (1987); Goldene Peitsche (1988); Premio Omenoni (1989); Gran Premio del Jockey Club (1991) British Classic Race wins: St. Leger Stakes (1979)

Honours
- Prix Alain Lequeux at Saint Malo

Significant horses
- Providential, Triptych, Le Glorieux
- Updated on 18 May 2009

Alain Lequeux (1947 – 26 April 2006) was one of France's leading jockeys in the 1970s and 1980s. He won 33 Group or Grade 1 races, including the 1981 Washington, D.C. International Stakes aboard Providential for trainer Charlie Whittingham. Son of leading French rider Guy Lequeux, he won more than 2,000 races while riding in France from 1963 to 1992. He won the 1974 Poule d'Essai des Pouliches (Fr-G1) (French One Thousand Guineas) with Dumka, and the 1979 St. Leger Stakes (Eng-G1) with Son of Love (Fr).

A noted gourmet, following his retirement from racing, Lequeux owned and operated the Cafe Lequeux in Chantilly not far from the Chantilly Racecourse.

He died in hospital at Senlis, Oise on 26 April 2006 of a cerebral hemorrhage at age 59.
