= Providential =

Irish-bred Thoroughbred racehorse

- Sire: Run the Gantlet
- Grandsire: Tom Rolfe
- Dam: Prudent Girl
- Damsire: Primera
- Sex: Stallion
- Foaled: 1977
- Country: Ireland
- Colour: Bay
- Breeder: Bertram R. Firestone
- Owner: 1) Bertram R. Firestone; 2) Serge Fradkoff (1980)
- Trainer: 1) François Boutin; 2) Olivier Douieb; 3) Charlie Whittingham
- Record: 18: 6-3-2
- Earnings: US$716,988 (equivalent)

Major wins
- Critérium de Saint-Cloud (1979); Prix Greffulhe (1980); Washington, D.C. International Stakes (1981); Hollywood Turf Cup Stakes (1981)
- Last updated on 21 November 2021

Providential (February 6, 1977 – May 1998) was an Irish-born Thoroughbred racehorse who competed successfully in France and won the most important race on turf in the United States. Bred and raced by Bertram R. Firestone, he was sired by Run the Gantlet, the 1971 American Champion Male Turf Horse and a son of Tom Rolfe, the 1965 Preakness Stakes winner and American Champion Three-Year-Old Male Horse. His dam was Prudent Girl, a daughter of Primera who raced in England where he won back-to-back editions of the Princess of Wales's Stakes in 1959–1960.

Trained by François Boutin, Providential made two starts at age two. After making a winning debut on October 29, 1979, at Saint-Cloud Racecourse, he came back on November 11 to win the Group 2 Critérium de Saint-Cloud. In January 1980, Providential was sold to Serge Fradkoff, a Swiss businessman who also campaigned Perrault and Kilijaro in France and the United States.

In his first start for his new owner on April 13, 1980, Providential won the Group 2 Prix Greffulhe at Longchamp Racecourse in Paris. On the same racecourse, the colt ran second in the Prix Hocquart and third in France's most important race for three-year-old colts, the Group 1 Prix du Jockey Club. Fradkoff then entrusted the horse's race conditioning to Olivier Douieb who saddled him to three unsuccessful starts in France, a third-place finish in the Premio Roma at Capannelle Racecourse in Rome, Italy, and twentieth place in a Group 1 race at Hipódromo de San Isidro in Argentina.

In 1981, Serge Fradkoff sent Providential to the care of U.S. Racing Hall of Fame trainer Charlie Whittingham at Santa Anita Park in California. In the US the horse was raced as Providential II. For Whittingham, Providential finished second in his October debut and then second in the Grade II Carleton F. Burke Handicap. Ridden by French jockey Alain Lequeux, in November Providential won the most important race of his career against an international field in the Washington, D.C. International Stakes at Laurel Park Racecourse in Laurel, Maryland over April Run. Returning to California, he won the inaugural running of the Hollywood Turf Cup Stakes at Hollywood Park Racetrack over John Henry who was fourth.

Raced in 1982 once, on dirt, he was 5th in the Santa Anita H. Providential was retired to stud. His offspring met with limited success in racing.

Providential died of a heart attack at age twenty-one in May 1998 at Derby Hill Farm in Mount Airy, Maryland.
