= Georges Bridgland =

French jockey and horse trainer (1915–1997)

George Bridgland
Personal information
- Born: 26 February 1915 France
- Died: July 1997 (aged 82)
- Occupation: Jockey / Trainer

Horse racing career
- Sport: Horse racing

Major racing wins
- Major race wins as a jockey: Derby Stakes (1947); Oaks Stakes (1944); St Leger Stakes (1941) as a trainer Prix de l'Arc de Triomphe (1964); St Leger Stakes (1956); King George VI and Queen Elizabeth Stakes (1957)

Significant horses
- Hycilla, Pearl Diver, Sun Castle

George Bridgland (26 February 1915 – July 1997) was a French, triple British Classic-winning jockey, and St Leger and Arc de Triomphe winning trainer.

He was born George Albert Richard Bridgland to British parents in France on 26 February 1915.

His riding career lasted from 1928 to 1948. Pre-war, he was a leading jockey in his native France, becoming runner-up in the French Jockeys' Championship in 1936. Then, due to the Second World War, he relocated to England, where he won three Classics. The first two were wartime races - the 1941 St Leger on Sun Castle, the 1944 Oaks on Hycilla. The third was the 1947 Derby, the first to be held on a Saturday, which he won on unfancied outsider Pearl Diver, beating the odds-on favourite Tudor Minstrel and denying champion jockey Gordon Richards what would have been his first Derby win.

Shortly afterwards, he began training and was similarly successful. He won the 1956 St Leger with Cambremer, the 1957 King George VI and Queen Elizabeth Stakes with Montaval and the Prix de l'Arc de Triomphe with Prince Royal in 1964.

He died in July 1997 aged 82.

== Major wins (as a jockey) ==
(United Kingdom) Great Britain

- Derby Stakes - Pearl Diver (1947)
- Oaks Stakes - Hycilla (1944)
- St Leger Stakes - Sun Castle (1941)

== Major wins (as a trainer) ==
France

- Prix de l'Arc de Triomphe - Prince Royal (1964)

(United Kingdom) Great Britain

- St Leger Stakes - Cambremer (1956)
- King George VI and Queen Elizabeth Stakes - Montaval (1957)

== See also ==
- List of jockeys
