= Freddie Palmer =

French-based jockey (1921–2020)

Personal information
- Born: 15 December 1921
- Died: 2020 (aged 98–99)
- Occupation: Jockey

Horse racing career
- Sport: Horse racing

Major racing wins
- British Classic Race wins: Derby Stakes (1955); Oaks Stakes (1956); St Leger Stakes (1956); Other major British race wins: Gold Cup (1959, 1962); Eclipse Stakes (1950, 1960); King George VI and Queen Elizabeth Stakes (1957); French Classic wins as jockey: Prix du Jockey Club (1955, 1962); Prix de Diane (3 times); Prix Royal-Oak (4 times) as trainer: Prix de Diane (1966); Prix Royal-Oak (1969); Irish Classic wins Irish 1,000 Guineas (1963)

Significant horses
- Cambremer, Montaval, Phil Drake, Sicarelle, Val de Loir

Freddie Palmer was a France-based jockey who won Classic races in England, Ireland and France. He was born on 15 December 1921 and became "a huge name" in flat racing in the 1950s.

He won his first major race in 1950 - the Eclipse Stakes on Flocon. His biggest successes came in 1955, when he rode Phil Drake to win the English Derby and Rapace to win the French version in the same season. The following year he won the Oaks with Sicarelle and the St Leger on Cambremer. Then in 1957, he won the King George VI and Queen Elizabeth Stakes on Montaval. He ended the 1950s with another big success on Wallaby in the 1959 Ascot Gold Cup. Among other French successes, he won the Grand Prix de Paris three times and the Prix Royal-Oak four times.

In 1962, he won a second Gold Cup on Balto, as well as a second Prix du Jockey Club on Val de Loir. He began a training career in 1964 and won two French classics - Fine Pearl in the Prix de Diane in 1966 and Le Chouan in the Prix Royal-Oak in 1969. His training career lasted until 1990, during which time he supported the careers of Jean-Claude Rouget, Patrick Monfort and Christian Scandella.

He died, aged 98, in 2020.

== Major wins (as jockey) ==
(United Kingdom) Great Britain

- Derby Stakes - Phil Drake (1955)
- Oaks Stakes - Sicarelle (1956)
- St Leger Stakes - Cambremer (1956)
- Ascot Gold Cup - (2) - Wallaby (1959), Balto (1962)
- Eclipse Stakes - (2) - Flocon (1950), Javelot (1960)
- King George VI and Queen Elizabeth Stakes - Montaval (1957)

(Republic of Ireland) Ireland

- Irish 1,000 Guineas - Gazpacho (1963)

France

- Prix du Jockey Club - (2) - Rapace (1955), Val de Loir (1962)
- Prix Royal-Oak - (4)
- Grand Prix de Paris - (3)

== Major wins (as trainer) ==
France

- Prix de Diane - Fine Pearl (1966)
- Prix Royal-Oak - Le Chouan (1969)

== See also ==
- List of jockeys
