= Grand Prix de Vichy =

Flat horse race in France

- Class: Group 3
- Location: Vichy Racecourse; Vichy, France
- Inaugurated: 1875
- Race type: Flat / Thoroughbred
- Website: france-galop.com

Race information
- Distance: 2,000 metres (1¼ miles)
- Surface: Turf
- Track: Right-handed
- Qualification: Three-years-old and up
- Weight: 53½ kg (3yo); 58 kg (4yo+); Allowances; 1½ kg for fillies and mares Penalties; 4 kg for Group 1 winners * 3 kg for Group 2 winners * 2 kg for Group 3 winners * * since January 1
- Purse: €56,000 (2020); 1st: €28,000

Grand Prix de Vichy-Auvergne
2021
Grand Glory	Diamond Vendome	Algiers

Previous years
2020
Spirit Of Nelson	Top Max	Styledargent
2019
Diamond Vendome	Soleil Marin	Royal Julius
2018
Noor Al Hawa	Golden Legend	Subway Dancer
2017
Best Fouad	Garlingari	Qurbaan
2016
Night Wish	Black Sea	Prestige Vendome
2015
Elliptique	Mambomiss	Meadow Creek
2014
Hippy	Ipswich	Vif Monsieur
2013
Saga Dream	Vally Jem	Shamalgan
2012
No Risk At All	Ok Coral	Don Bosco
2011
Cirrus Des Aigles	Agent Secret	Saga Dream

2010-2001
2010
Agent Secret	Pont Des Arts	Tip Toe
2009
Daly Daly	Inestimable	Celtic Wolf
2008
Hapsburg	Kocab	Boris De Deauville
2007
Atlantic Air	Balius	Kentucky Dynamite
2006
Touch Of Land	Ruwi	Mohandas
2005
Touch Of Land	Apsis	Islero Noir
2004
Bailador	Demon Dancer	Mister Farmer
2003
Vangelis	Labirinto	Almond Mousse
2002
Cheshire	King Of Tara	Choc Ice
2001
Boismorand	Cazoulias	Homeland

2000-1990
2000
Kerrygold	Tijiyr	Milord Fontenaille
1999
Victory Cry	Trait De Genie	Quel Senor
1998
Steward	Foggy Day	Go Boldly
1997
Baroud D'Honneur	Bulington	Zero Problemo
1996
Bulington	Diamond Mix	Top Glory
1995
Marildo	Solidoun	Captain Haddock
1994
Mint Crisp	Captain Haddock	Marildo
1993
Marildo	Oumnaz	Vincenzo
1992
Goofalik	Tel Quel	Daros
1991
Danae De Brule	Mister Mat	Echoes
1990
North Col	Per Quod	Kandis

The Grand Prix de Vichy is a Group 3 flat horse race in France open to thoroughbreds aged three years or older. It is run at Vichy over a distance of 2,000 metres (about 1¼ miles), and it is scheduled to take place each year in July.

== History ==
The event was established in 1875, and it was originally called the Grand Prix de Vichy. It was run as a handicap until 1899, and during this period its distance was frequently modified. For several years thereafter it was titled the Grand Prix International du Cercle de Vichy. It was abandoned in 1907, and became known as the Grand Prix de la Ville de Vichy the following year.

The title was appended with "et de la Société de Sport de France" in 1958. The Société de Sport de France owned the racecourse, and later merged with similar organisations to form France Galop.

The event reverted to its original name in 1965, and was run as a handicap in 1970. It was given Group 3 status in 1976.

The name of the region where Vichy is located, Auvergne, was added to the title in 2005 and removed in 2015.

The race has been contested over various distances, with spells over 2,600 metres (1900–41, 1943–64, 1966–75), 2,400 metres (1976–91) and 2,000 metres (1992–present).

== Records ==
Most successful horse (2 wins):

- Shikani – 1960, 1961
- Perouges – 1979, 1980
- Marildo – 1993, 1995
- Touch of Land – 2005, 2006

Leading jockey (6 wins):

- Christophe Soumillon – Kerrygold (2000), Vangelis (2003), Bailador (2004), Daly Daly (2009), Saga Dream (2013), One For Bobby (2023)

Leading trainer (4 wins):

- James Cunnington – Marichette (1881), Dacis (1891), Machiavel (1898), Kerlaz (1900)
- Robert Denman – Gouvernant (1904), Marsa (1910), Checkmate (1923), Alguazil (1926, dead-heat)
- Antoine Lassard – Yakoba (1934), Ortolan (1935), Champittet (1941), Clodoche (1943)

Leading owner (7 wins):

- Marcel Boussac – Grillemont (1924, dead-heat), Alguazil (1926, dead-heat), Thaouka (1932), Dadji (1937), Coaraze (1947), Amphis (1952), Shaker (1954)

== Winners since 1979 ==
Year	Winner	Age	Jockey	Trainer	Owner	Time
1979	Perouges	4	Jacques Le Deunf	Alain Lyon	André Rivière
1980	Perouges	5	Jacques Le Deunf	Alain Lyon	André Rivière
1981	Lord Jack	4	Jean Massard	Henri Gleizes	Mrs François Elion
1982	Karkour	4	Yves Saint-Martin	Joseph Audon	Ecurie Manhattan
1983	Terreno	5	Yves Saint-Martin	François Boutin	Gerry Oldham
1984	Nature	6	Jean Massard	François Elion	Mrs Jean Carlier
1985	Lauville	4	Guy Guignard	Gérard Philippeau	Marie-Louise Blain
1986	Agent Double	5	Gary W. Moore	Criquette Head	Jacques Wertheimer
1987	Sarepta	6	Robert Laplanche	Louis Boulard	Jacques Bedel	2:25.70
1988	Altashar	3	Eric Saint-Martin	Alain de Royer-Dupré	HH Aga Khan IV	2:29.45
1989	Prince Ruffian	4	Cash Asmussen	François Bellenger	Dominique Boulloche	2:34.40
1990	North Col	3	Tony Cruz	Jonathan Pease	Simon Emmet	2:29.00
1991	Danae de Brule	4	Robert Laplanche	Maurice Prod'homme	Léon Seile	2:34.50
1992	Goofalik	5	Cash Asmussen	John Hammond	David Thompson	2:03.30
1993	Marildo	6	Guy Guignard	David Smaga	David Smaga	2:02.30
1994	Mint Crisp	4	Olivier Doleuze	Dominique Sépulchre	Mrs A. Rogers	2:08.70
1995	Marildo	8	Guy Guignard	David Smaga	David Smaga	2:05.50
1996	Bulington	4	Cash Asmussen	Henri-Alex Pantall	Philippe Pierry	2:04.20
1997	Baroud d'Honneur	4	Franck Blondel	Jean-François Bernard	Axelle Nègre	2:05.10
1998	Steward	5	Sylvain Guillot	Dominique Sépulchre	Georges Coude	2:06.50
1999	Victory Cry	3	Olivier Peslier	André Fabre	Daniel Wildenstein	2:05.30
2000	Kerrygold	4	Christophe Soumillon	Pascal Bary	Antonia Devin	2:08.60
2001	Boismorand	5	Vincent Vion	Melchior Mathet	Maurice Clifford	2:09.20
2002	Cheshire	5	Yutaka Take	John Hammond	Peter Willmott	2:06.40
2003	Vangelis	4	Christophe Soumillon	Alain de Royer-Dupré	Napping Ltd	2:08.90
2004	Bailador	4	Christophe Soumillon	André Fabre	Edouard de Rothschild	2:08.64
2005	Touch of Land	5	Christophe Lemaire	Henri-Alex Pantall	Gary Tanaka	2:03.80
2006	Touch of Land	6	Olivier Peslier	Henri-Alex Pantall	Gary Tanaka	2:10.19
2007	Atlantic Air	5	Thierry Thulliez	Yves de Nicolay	Antonia Devin	2:35.15
2008	Hapsburg	4	Ioritz Mendizabal	Eric Libaud	Jean Luck	2:05.45
2009	Daly Daly	5	Christophe Soumillon	Robert Laplanche	Bernard Giraudon	2:12.12
2010	Agent Secret	4	François-Xavier Bertras	François Rohaut	Raoul Temam	2:15.12
2011	Cirrus des Aigles	5	Franck Blondel	Corine Barande-Barbe	Jean-Claude Dupouy	2:14.00
2012	No Risk at All	5	Ioritz Mendizabal	Jean-Paul Gallorini	Jean-Paul Gallorini	2:06.82
2013	Saga Dream	7	Christophe Soumillon	Freddy Lemercier	Freddy Lemercier	2:07.79
2014	Hippy	6	Eric Libaud	Pierre-Charles Boudot	Jacques Seror	2:10.18
2015	Elliptique	4	Amelie Foulon	André Fabre	Rothschild Family	2:07.48
2016	Night Wish	6	Tony Piccone	Sarah Steinberg	Stall Salzburg	2:05.17
2017	Best Fouad	6	Christophe Soumillon	Francois Rohaut	LG Bloodstock	2:05.38
2018	Noor Al Hawa	5	Theo Bachelot	Elias Mikhalides	Hamad Al Attiyah	2:03.93
2019	Diamond Vendome	4	Christophe Soumillon	Christophe Escuder	Laurence Samoun & Georges Duca	2:05.29
2020	Spirit of Nelson	5	Cristian Demuro	Jerome Reynier	Jean-Claude Seroul	2:06.50
2021	Grand Glory	5	Cristian Demuro	Gianluca Bietolini	Albert Frassetto, John D'Amato & Mike Pietrangelo	2:07.02
2022	Riocorvo	6	Gérald Mossé	Carlos Laffon-Parias	Georgiana Cabrero	2:05.30
2023	One For Bobby	4	Christophe Soumillon	Hughie Morrison	Ann Marshall	2:04.33
2026	Zaydann	4	Mickael Barzalona	Francis-Henri Graffard	Aga Khan Studs	2:05:41

== Earlier winners ==
- 1875: Damoiseau
- 1876: Mondaine
- 1877: Giboulee
- 1878: Le Marquis
- 1879: Gift
- 1880:
- 1881: Marichette
- 1882–85: no race
- 1886: Prytanee
- 1887: Ary
- 1888: Bocage
- 1889: Etretat
- 1890: Belle Dame
- 1891: Dacis
- 1892: Le Cordouan
- 1893:
- 1894: Lanterne Magique
- 1895: Feuillet
- 1896:
- 1897:
- 1898: Machiavel
- 1899:
- 1900: Kerlaz
- 1901: Lady Killer
- 1902: Red Cedar
- 1903: Alpha
- 1904: Gouvernant
- 1905: Rataplan
- 1906: Eider
- 1907: no race
- 1908: Roi Herode
- 1909: Chulo
- 1910: Marsa
- 1911: Dor
- 1912: Predicateur
- 1913: Tripolette
- 1914–19: no race
- 1920: Astypalee
- 1921: Herlies
- 1922: Harpocrate
- 1923: Checkmate
- 1924: Grillemont / Seclin ^{1}
- 1925: Momus
- 1926: Alguazil / Javelot ^{1}
- 1927: Juveilin
- 1928: Rovigo
- 1929: Frolic ^{2}
- 1930: Guernanville
- 1931: Hetre Pourpre
- 1932: Thaouka
- 1933: Casterari
- 1934: Yakoba
- 1935: Ortolan
- 1936: Vatellor
- 1937: Dadji
- 1938: Eclair au Chocolat
- 1939: Transtevere
- 1940: no race
- 1941: Champittet
- 1942: Tambourin
- 1943: Clodoche
- 1944: no race
- 1945: Achille
- 1946:
- 1947: Coaraze
- 1948: Pegase
- 1949: Astragram
- 1950: Monticola
- 1951: Ombrette
- 1952: Amphis
- 1953: Romantisme
- 1954: Shaker
- 1955: Bewitched
- 1956: Cambremer
- 1957: Jockero
- 1958: Makalu
- 1959: Wolfram
- 1960: Shikani
- 1961: Shikani
- 1962: Karol
- 1963: Signora
- 1964: Amertume
- 1965: Carvin
- 1966: Cantilius
- 1967: Dan Kano
- 1968: Crozier
- 1969: Manitoba
- 1970:
- 1971:
- 1972: Royal Land
- 1973: Sophora
- 1974: Authi
- 1975: Ambrellita
- 1976: Diagramatic
- 1977: Guadanini
- 1978: Tempus Fugit

^{1} The 1924 and 1926 races were dead-heats and have joint winners.
^{2} Le Chatelet finished first in 1929, but he was disqualified for obstruction.

== See also ==
- List of French flat horse races
- Recurring sporting events established in 1875 – this race is included under its original title, Grand Prix de Vichy.
