= La Farina =

French-bred Thoroughbred racehorse

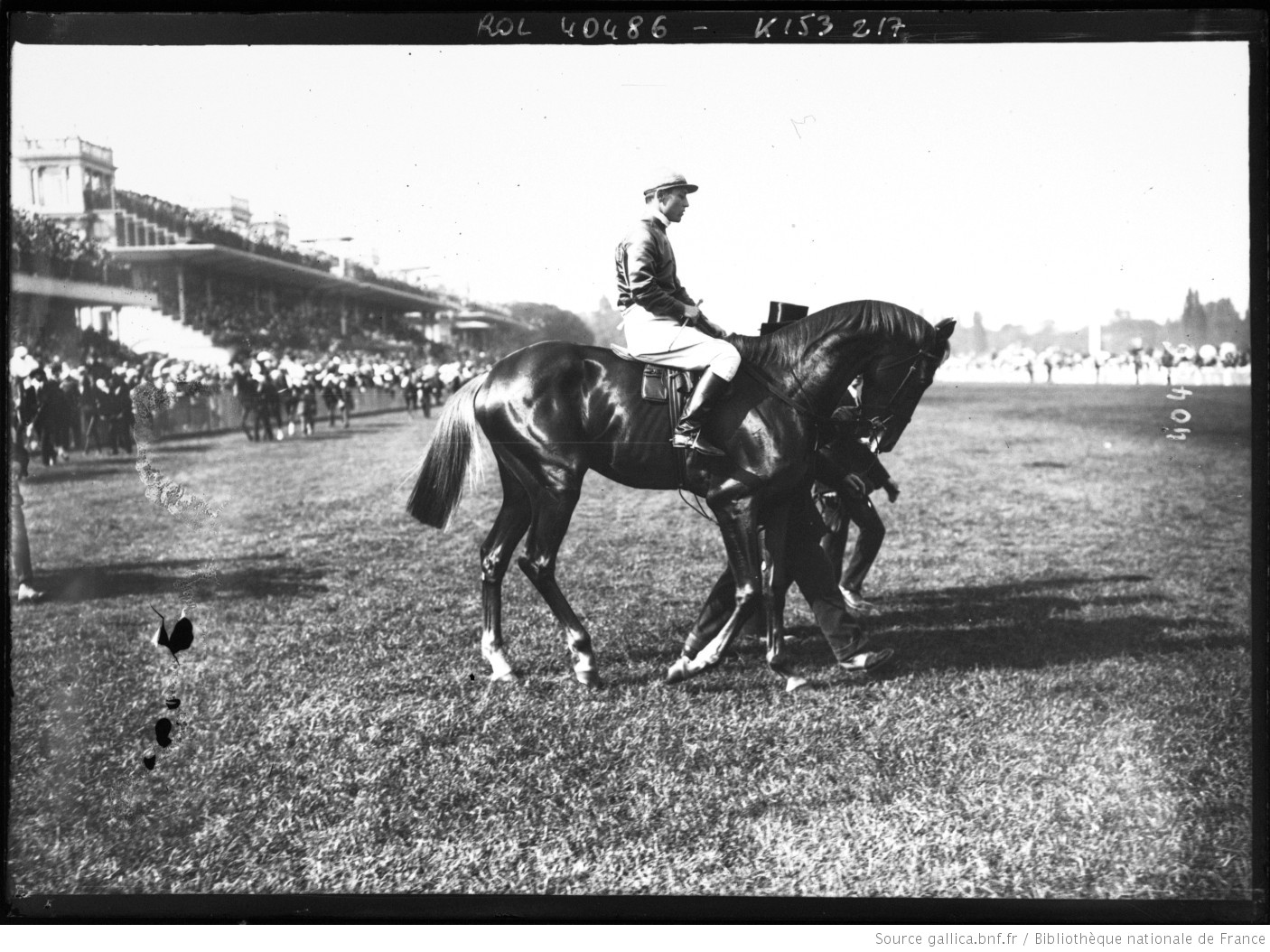
- 28 June, 1914, at Longchamp
- Sire: Sans Souci
- Grandsire: Le Roi Soleil
- Dam: Malatesta
- Damsire: Isinglass
- Sex: Stallion
- Foaled: 1911
- Country: France
- Colour: Chestnut
- Breeder: Edouard Alphonse de Rothschild
- Owner: Edouard Alphonse de Rothschild
- Trainer: John C. Watson
- Record: 9: 4-2-1

Major wins
- Prix La Rochette (1913); Prix Daru (1914); Prix Lupin (1914)

La Farina (1911–1935) was a French Thoroughbred racehorse and sire who was noted for his rivalry with his contemporary Sardanapale and has been regarded as one of the best French horses of the 20th century. In 1913 he showed promise as a juvenile, winning the Prix La Rochette. In the following year he defeated Sardanapale in the Prix Daru and the Prix Lupin before being narrowly beaten by his rival in the Grand Prix de Paris. La Farina's racing career was curtailed by the outbreak of the First World War but he went on to become a successful sire of winners. He died in 1935.

== Background ==
La Farina was a "light and narrow" chestnut horse with four white socks bred in France by his owner Edouard Alphonse de Rothschild. He was the best horse sired by Sans Souci, who won the Grand Prix de Paris for Rothschild in 1907. His dam Malatesta was a daughter of English Triple Crown winner Isinglass. Malatesta was descended from the broodmare Charlotte Russe, whose other descendants have included the Kentucky Derby winner Gallahadion and the Prix de l'Arc de Triomphe winner Eclair au Chocolat. La Farina was trained during his racing career by John Watson and ridden in his major races by Frank O'Neill.

== Racing career ==
=== 1913: two-year-old season ===
As a two-year-old, La Farina contested the prestigious Prix Morny at Deauville Racecourse but was beaten by Sardanapale a colt owned by Edouard de Rothchild's cousin Maurice de Rothschild. In the following month he recorded his first major victory when he won the colts' division of the Prix La Rochette over 1100 metres at Longchamp Racecourse.

=== 1914: three-year-old season ===
In the spring of 1914, La Farina finished second to Listman in the Poule d'Essai des Poulains and ran third behind Durbar (later to win The Derby) in the Prix Biennale. On his next appearance he was matched against Sardanapale, who had won the Prix Lagrange and Prix Hocquart, in the Prix Daru over 2100 metres at Longchamp. He defeated his rival and won again when the colts met for the third time in the Prix Lupin over the same course and distance.

On 28 June, La Farina faced Sardanapale yet again in the Grand Prix de Paris over 3000 metres at Longchamp Racecourse. La Farina led from the start and when Sardanapale up to challenge 800 metres out, the two colts drew away from the rest of the field. After a prolonged struggle, Sardanapale got the better of La Farina 100 metres from the finish and won by a neck, with a gap of four lengths back to Durbar in third place.

In July, La Farina contested the Prix du Président de la République over 2500 metres at Maisons-Laffitte Racecourse but failed to reproduce his earlier form and finished unplaced behind Sardanapale. Shortly afterwards, the outbreak of the War led to the suspension of horse racing in France.

== Stud record ==
La Farina was retired from racing to become a breeding stallion. The best of his winners included:

- Tapin (1921), Prix Greffulhe, Poule d'Essai des Poulains, Lincolnshire Handicap.
- Mont Bernina (1923), Jockey Club Cup
- Bubbles (1925), Prix Lupin and the Prix du Président de la République
- Lovelace (1927), Prix d'Ispahan, Prix du Prince d'Orange and Prix de la Forêt
- Crudité (1932), Grand Prix de Paris

== Assessment ==
In their book A Century of Champions, based on a modified version of the Timeform system, John Randall and Tony Morris rated La Farina the sixty-sixth best racehorse of twentieth century, the thirteenth-best of the century to have been trained in France, and the second best horse in the world in 1914. The authors commented that La Farina's defeat in the Grand Prix "prevented him receiving the recognition he deserved a one of France's greatest horses".

== Sire line tree ==
- La Farina
  - Tapin
    - Fleuret
  - Mont Bernina
    - Quicko
  - Bubbles
    - Eclair au Chocolat
    - Cidre Mousseux
      - Pharamond
    - Magister
    - Ocarina
      - Lauso
        - Precipice Wood
          - Aberwiffy
          - Forgive 'n Forget
  - Lovelace

== Pedigree ==
Pedigree of La Farina (FR), chestnut stallion 1911
Sire Sans Souci (FR) 1904	Le Roi Soleil (FR); 1895	Heaume	Hermit
Sire Sans Souci (FR) 1904	Le Roi Soleil (FR); 1895	Heaume	Bella
Sire Sans Souci (FR) 1904	Le Roi Soleil (FR); 1895	Mlle de la Valliere	Boiard
Sire Sans Souci (FR) 1904	Le Roi Soleil (FR); 1895	Mlle de la Valliere	Laversine
Sire Sans Souci (FR) 1904	Sanctimony (GB); 1896	St Serf	St Simon*
Sire Sans Souci (FR) 1904	Sanctimony (GB); 1896	St Serf	Feronia
Sire Sans Souci (FR) 1904	Sanctimony (GB); 1896	Golden Iris	Bend Or
Sire Sans Souci (FR) 1904	Sanctimony (GB); 1896	Golden Iris	Gardenia*
Dam Malatesta (GB) 1898	Isinglass (GB); 1890	Isonomy	Sterling
Dam Malatesta (GB) 1898	Isinglass (GB); 1890	Isonomy	Isola Bella
Dam Malatesta (GB) 1898	Isinglass (GB); 1890	Dead Lock	Wenlock
Dam Malatesta (GB) 1898	Isinglass (GB); 1890	Dead Lock	Malpractice
Dam Malatesta (GB) 1898	Parisina (GB); 1889	St Simon*	Galopin*
Dam Malatesta (GB) 1898	Parisina (GB); 1889	St Simon*	St Angela*
Dam Malatesta (GB) 1898	Parisina (GB); 1889	Princess Katinka	Macaroni*
Dam Malatesta (GB) 1898	Parisina (GB); 1889	Princess Katinka	Charlotte Russe (Family: 4-e)

* La Farina is inbred 4S x 3D to the stallion St Simon, meaning that he appears fourth generation on the sire side of his pedigree, and third generation on the dam side of his pedigree.

* La Farina is inbred 5S x 4D to the stallion Macaroni, meaning that he appears fifth generation (via Gardinia) on the sire side of his pedigree, and fourth generation on the dam side of his pedigree.
