= Cirrus des Aigles =

French-bred Thoroughbred racehorse

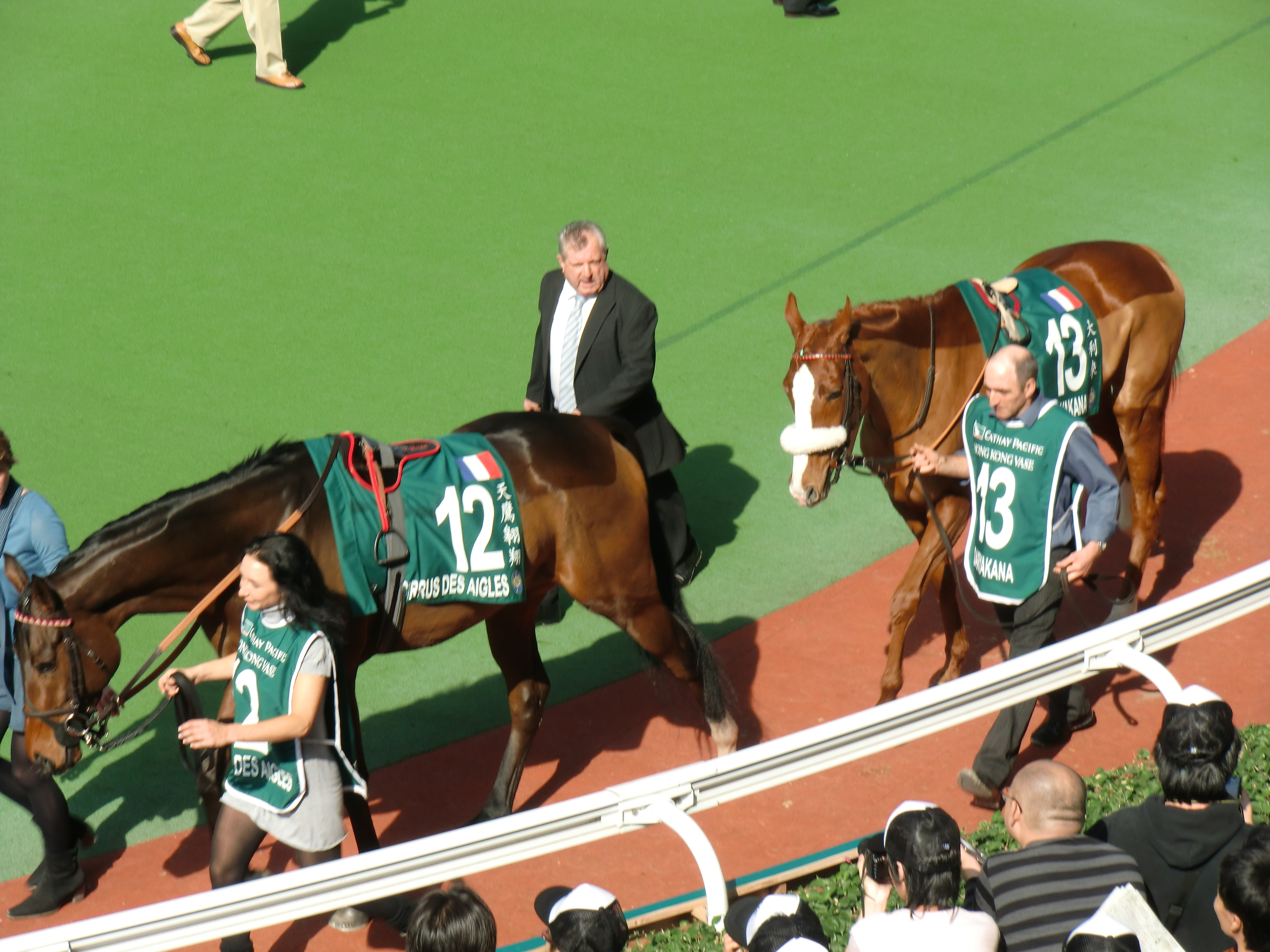
- Cirrus des Aigles (left) with 2009 Hong Kong Vase Winner Daryakana in Sha Tin Racecourse.
- Sire: Even Top
- Grandsire: Topanoora
- Dam: Taille de Guepe
- Damsire: Septieme Ciel
- Sex: Gelding
- Foaled: 8 May 2006
- Country: France
- Colour: Bay
- Breeder: Yvon Lelimouzin & Benoit Deschamps
- Owner: Jean-Claude-Alain Dupouy & Xavier Niel
- Trainer: Corine Barande-Barbe
- Record: 67: 22-20-6
- Earnings: £6,179,490

Major wins
- Prix du Prince d'Orange (2009); Prix du Conseil de Paris (2009); Prix Dollar (2010, 2012, 2013); La Coupe (2011); Grand Prix de Vichy (2011); Prix Gontaut-Biron (2011); Grand Prix de Deauville (2011); Champion Stakes (2011); Dubai Sheema Classic (2012); Prix Ganay (2012, 2014, 2015); La Coupe de Maisons-Laffitte (2013); Prix d'Ispahan (2014); Coronation Cup (2014)

Awards
- European Champion Older Horse (2011); Timeform rating: 135
- Last updated on 8 October 2024

Cirrus des Aigles (foaled 8 May 2006) is a retired French Thoroughbred racehorse. In a career which lasted from October 2008 until December 2015 he raced in France, the United Kingdom, Hong Kong, Japan and the United Arab Emirates. After racing successfully at three and four years of age he improved to become one of the world's leading racehorses as a five-year-old in 2011. His achievements were recognised when he was awarded the title of European Champion Older Horse at the Cartier Racing Awards.

Cirrus des Aigles' Group One wins include the Champion Stakes in 2011, the Dubai Sheema Classic in 2012, the Prix d'Ispahan and the Coronation Cup in 2014 and a record three wins in Prix Ganay. Other major successes are three wins in the Prix Dollar as well as victories in the Prix du Prince d'Orange, Prix du Conseil de Paris, Grand Prix de Vichy, Prix Gontaut-Biron, Grand Prix de Deauville and La Coupe de Maisons-Laffitte.

On 28 March 2016, it was announced that Cirrus Des Aigles had been retired.

== Background ==
Cirrus des Aigles is a bay gelding bred in France by Yvon Lelimouzin & Benoit Deschamps. He was sired by the Irish-bred stallion Even Top, a descendant of the Byerley Turk, whose most notable racecourse performance came when he was beaten narrowly by Mark of Esteem in the 1996 2000 Guineas. He is best known as a sire of National Hunt horses, with Cirrus des Aigles being by far his best flat runner. Cirrus des Aigles' dam, Taille de Guepe ("Wasp's Waist") was distantly related to the notable American performers Omar Khayyam and Aloma's Ruler, but was too slow to race and was given as a present by her trainer Élie Lellouche to Lelimouzin, who supervised the Chantilly training ground known as "Les Aigles" (the Eagles).

Cirrus des Aigles was sent into training with Corine Barande-Barbe at Chantilly, but proved to be almost unmanageable and was gelded in March 2008. As a gelding, Cirrus des Aigles was ineligible to compete in several important European races, including the Prix de l'Arc de Triomphe.

== Racing career ==
=== 2008: two-year-old season ===
Cirrus des Aigles failed to win in four appearances as a two-year-old. He finished fourth on his debut in a maiden race at Chantilly Racecourse in October, and was then placed in minor races at Maisons-Laffitte, Saint-Cloud and Deauville.

=== 2009: three-year-old season ===
Cirrus des Aigles ran seventeen times as a three-year-old, winning six races including the Prix du Prince d'Orange and the Prix du Conseil de Paris. He began the year by running four times on the all-weather surface at Cagnes-sur-mer Racecourse, finishing second three times and recording his first victory in a 1600m event in late January. He returned to the turf to win two races at Longchamp in May and was then moved up to Listed class. He was placed four times before winning the Grand Prix du Lion d'Angers at Le Lion-d'Angers Racecourse in August.

In September, Cirrus des Aigles contested his first Group race. Ridden by Frank Blondel he was driven out to take the lead in the closing stages and defeated World Heritage by three quarters of a length in the Prix du Prince d'Orange over 2000m at Longchamp. A month later he won the Prix du Conseil de Paris over 2400m, taking the lead in the straight and pulling clear to win by six lengths. On his final start of the season he was sent to Sha Tin Racecourse where he finished fifth to Daryakana in the Hong Kong Vase.

=== 2010: four-year-old season ===
Cirrus des Aigles ran seven times as a four-year-old, winning two races including the Prix Dollar. He began the season returning to Cagnes-sur-Mer where he finished fourth in a Listed Race and was then off the racecourse for six months. Cirrus des Aigles returned with a third place behind Vision d'Etat in the Prix Gontaut-Biron and then won the Listed Prix du Boulogne at Longchamp. In October he recorded his first win at Group Two level when he won the Prix Dollar "comfortably" by two lengths from the German gelding Budai. Cirrus des Aigles again ended his year in Asia as he finished unplaced in the Japan Cup and the Hong Kong Cup.

=== 2011: five-year-old season ===
Cirrus des Aigles ran eleven times as a five-year-old, winning five races including La Coupe, the Grand Prix de Vichy the Prix Gontaut-Biron the Grand Prix de Deauville and the Champion Stakes. He finished placed in the Prix Exbury, the Prix Ganay, the Prix d'Ispahan (beaten a neck by Goldikova) before recording his first win of the year in La Coupe at Longchamp in June, leading from the start and beating a field which included the multiple Group One winner Stacelita. He was narrowly beaten by Sarafina in the Grand Prix de Saint-Cloud but then won his next three races. He started odds on favourite for the Grand Prix de Vichy in July and won comfortably, despite conceding weight to his five opponents. On 14 August he took the Prix Gontaut-Biron by eight lengths and two weeks later he added the Grand Prix de Deauville, finishing ten lengths clear of Silver Pond. Cirrus des Aigles was made favourite for a repeat win in the Prix Dollar, but after leading in the straight he was beaten a short neck by the Prince of Wales's Stakes winner Byword, to whom he was conceding four pounds.

In October, Cirrus des Aigles was sent to race in Britain for the first time when he contested the Champion Stakes over ten furlongs at Ascot. The field for the most valuable race ever run in Britain included many leading horses including So You Think, Nathaniel, Snow Fairy, Midday and Twice Over. Ridden by Christophe Soumillon, Cirrus des Aigles raced just behind the front-runners before moving forward to challenge for the lead a furlong from the finish. In a strongly contested finish, he prevailed by three-quarters of a length from So You Think, with Snow Fairy half a length back in third. After the race Soumillon was given a five-day riding ban and lost his £50,000 share of the prize money for using his whip six times inside the furlong. He pointed out that he had been unable to see the furlong marker and claimed that the controversial rule "makes no sense". Barande-Barbe described the win as her best day in racing and said that Cirrus des Aigles "keeps improving, and has just run best race of his life."

On his final start of the season he finished fifth to California Memory in the Hong Kong Cup.

At the Cartier Racing Awards, Cirrus des Aigles was named European Champion Older Horse.

=== 2012: six-year-old season ===
In the Dubai Sheema Classic, Cirrus des Aigles' win provided France's Corine Barande-Barbe with the first ever win by a female trainer on Dubai World Cup Night. The gelding tracked the leaders before taking the lead in the straight and holding off the late challenge of St Nicholas Abbey by a neck. On 29 April Cirrus des Aigles returned to France to contest the Prix Ganay. He started odds-on favourite and led after 100m. In the straight he pulled away from his opponents to win by eight lengths from Giofra and Reliable Man. In May, Cirrus des Aigles started the 4/5 favourite for the Prix d'Ispahan but was headed in the closing stages and beaten three quarters of a length by the filly Golden Lilac. Several weeks after the race it was revealed that Cirrus des Aigles had tested positive for a banned anti-inflammatory drug. Barande-Barbe denied any wrongdoing.

A minor injury in summer took longer than expected to heal, and Cirrus des Aigles was forced to miss planned engagements in the King George VI and Queen Elizabeth Stakes and the International Stakes. The gelding finally reappeared for the Prix Dollar at Longchamp on 6 October. Racing on very soft ground, Cirrus des Aigles took the lead approaching the straight and drew away from his seven rivals to win "very easily" by nine lengths. Two weeks later, Cirrus des Aigles was matched against Frankel in the Champion Stakes at Ascot. The gelding made much of the running before being overtaken by Frankel in the straight. He finished one and three quarter lengths behind Frankel and two and a half lengths clear of the third placed Nathaniel. In December, Cirrus des Aigles was sent to Hong Kong to contest the Hong Kong Cup but was withdrawn from the race after sustaining an injury in training.

=== 2013: seven-year-old season ===
Following the retirement of Frankel, Cirrus des Aigles was the highest rated racehorse in the world in early 2013. On his first appearance of the season, he started favourite for the Grand Prix de Saint-Cloud but after taking the lead in the straight he faded into fifth place behind the German colt Novellist. On 27 July, Cirrus des Aigles started 6/4 favourite for the King George VI and Queen Elizabeth Stakes, but was never able to challenge for the lead and finished fourth behind Novellist, Trading Leather and Hillstar. Cirrus des Aigles was dropped in class but failed to win in two races at Deauville in August. He was beaten a head by Petit Chevalier in the Group Three Prix Gontaut-Biron and then finished fifth behind Tres Blue in the Grand Prix de Deauville.

On 20 September, Cirrus de Aigles recorded his first win for almost a year as led from the start to win La Coupe de Maisons-Laffitte by two and a half lengths from Vally Jem. On 5 October he became the first horse to win the Prix Dollar for the third time, winning by one and a half lengths from Mandour. Two weeks later, he was sent to England to contest his third Champion Stakes and started the 6/4 favourite in a field of ten. He made a strong challenge in the straight and finished second by a neck to Farhh, with The Derby winner Ruler of the World half a length away in third. In December he was sent to Hong Kong again and finished third behind Akeed Mofeed and Tokei Halo in the Hong Kong Cup.

=== 2014: eight-year-old season ===
Cirrus des Aigles began his 2014 season in a race on the Polytrack surface at Chantilly on 4 March in which he finished fourth behind Now We Can. On 29 March at Meydan Racecourse, Cirrus des Aigles started at odds of 9/1 for the Dubai Sheema Classic. He took the lead in the straight but was overtaken entering the final furlong and was beaten one and a half lengths into second place by the Japanese mare Gentildonna. On his return to Europe, Cirrus des Aigles was matched against the undefeated World Champion and Cartier Horse of the Year Treve in the Prix Ganay at Longchamp on 27 April. The gelding took the lead in the straight and fought back after being overtaken by Treve to win the race by a short neck. Four weeks later, Cirrus des Aigles started odds-on favourite for the Prix d'Ispahan and won from Anodin and Pollyanna, with the leading British colt Olympic Glory in fourth. He subsequently ran in the Coronation Cup on the Epsom Derby card on 7 June and was a comfortable winner at 10/11 SP favourite. His jockey Christophe Soumillon dismounted immediately after the winning line concerned that his mount may have gone lame, but he was pronounced fine shortly after by his trainer Mme C Barbe.

Cirrus des Aigles returned to the racecourse on 4 October when he attempted to win the Prix Dollar for a fourth time. He finished first ahead of Fractional but was demoted to fifth place after a steward's enquiry. Two weeks later he contested the Champion Stakes for the fourth time and started the 7/4 favourite. Racing on heavy ground he never looked likely to win and finished fifth of the nine runners behind Noble Mission. He ended the season with another trip to Hong Kong and finished fourth behind Designs On Rome in the Hong Kong Cup on 14 December.

=== 2015: nine-year-old season ===
Cirrus des Aigles took some time to recover from exertions in Hong Kong and did not reappear until May, when he attempted to win the Prix Ganay for a third time. Starting at odds of 3.7/1 in a seven-runner field, he led from the start and won by one and three quarter lengths from Al Kazeem. Three weeks later he started second favourite for the Prix d'Ispahan but finished last of the four runners behind Solow after breaking a shoe in the early stages. A bruised fetlock prevented him from contesting the Grand Prix de Saint-Cloud and he was rested until autumn. On September 12 he started at odds of 8/1 for the Irish Champion Stakes and finished last of the seven runners behind Golden Horn. He failed to recapture his best form in three subsequent starts, finishing fifth in the Prix Dollar, fourth in the Prix Royal-Oak and tenth in the Hong Kong Vase.

Following a disappointing exercise gallop in early 2016, a veterinary examination revealed "calcification on a sesamoid ligament", meaning that Cirrus des Aigles would be at risk of serious injury if he raced again. His retirement was announced on Facebook on 28 March.

As of 2020, Cirrus des Aigles remains at the Corine Barande-Barbe stable as a companion to younger horses.

== Assessment ==
In 2009 Cirrus des Aigles made his first appearance in the World Thoroughbred Rankings when he was given a rating of 117, placing him just outside the world's top 100. He was rated a pound higher in 2010, placing him in a tie for 95th place. In the annual ratings for 2011, Cirrus des Aigles was rated on 128, making him the third best racehorse in the world, level with Danedream and behind only Frankel and Black Caviar. He was the highest rated older male and the highest in the Intermediate distance (10 furlong/ 2000 metre) division. In 2012, Cirrus des Aigles was the second highest-rated horse in the world, nine pounds behind Frankel and a pound ahead of Black Caviar. In 2013, his rating dropped to 123, making him the 24th best racehorse in the world.

== Pedigree ==
Pedigree of Cirrus des Aigles (FR), bay gelding, 2006
| Sire Even Top (IRE) 1993 | Topanoora; 1987 | Ahonoora | Lorenzaccio |
| Sire Even Top (IRE) 1993 | Topanoora; 1987 | Ahonoora | Helen Nichols |
| Sire Even Top (IRE) 1993 | Topanoora; 1987 | Topping Girl | Sea Hawk |
| Sire Even Top (IRE) 1993 | Topanoora; 1987 | Topping Girl | Round Eye |
| Sire Even Top (IRE) 1993 | Skevena; 1983 | Niniski | Nijinsky II |
| Sire Even Top (IRE) 1993 | Skevena; 1983 | Niniski | Virginia Hills |
| Sire Even Top (IRE) 1993 | Skevena; 1983 | Skhiza | Targowice |
| Sire Even Top (IRE) 1993 | Skevena; 1983 | Skhiza | Anticlea |
| Dam Taille de Guepe (FR) 1999 | Septieme Ciel; 1987 | Seattle Slew | Bold Reasoning |
| Dam Taille de Guepe (FR) 1999 | Septieme Ciel; 1987 | Seattle Slew | My Charmer |
| Dam Taille de Guepe (FR) 1999 | Septieme Ciel; 1987 | Maximova | Green Dancer |
| Dam Taille de Guepe (FR) 1999 | Septieme Ciel; 1987 | Maximova | Baracala |
| Dam Taille de Guepe (FR) 1999 | Roots; 1992 | Funambule | Lyphard |
| Dam Taille de Guepe (FR) 1999 | Roots; 1992 | Funambule | Sonoma |
| Dam Taille de Guepe (FR) 1999 | Roots; 1992 | Ruma | Rheffic |
| Dam Taille de Guepe (FR) 1999 | Roots; 1992 | Ruma | Runnello (Family: 9-h) |
