= Prix Dollar =

Flat horse race in France

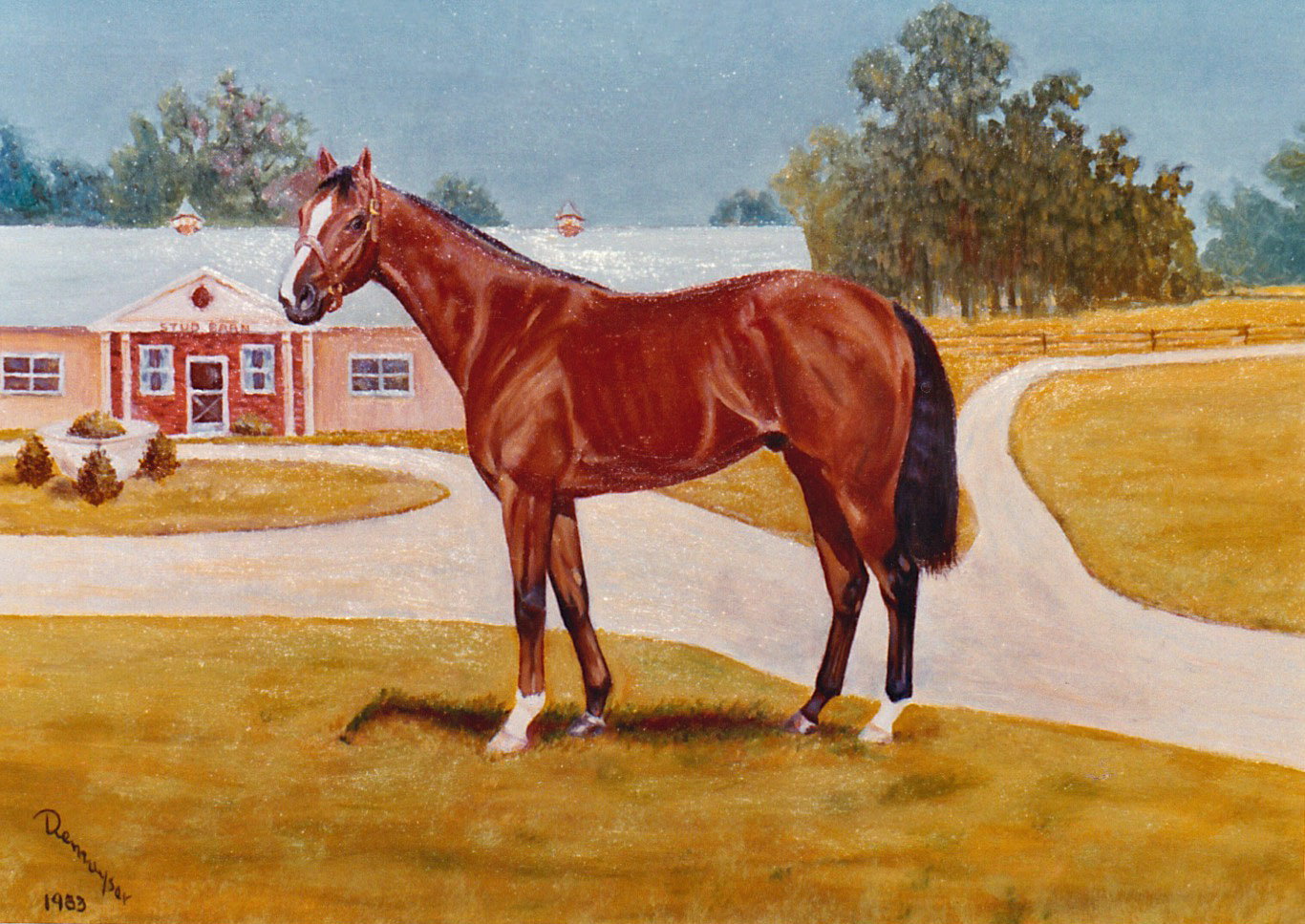
- Northern Baby, winner in 1980, oil on canvas painted by Bob Demuyser (1920–2003)
- Class: Group 2
- Location: Longchamp Racecourse; Paris, France
- Inaugurated: 1905
- Race type: Flat / Thoroughbred
- Sponsor: Qatar
- Website: france-galop.com

Race information
- Distance: 1,950 metres (1m 1¾f)
- Surface: Turf
- Track: Right-handed
- Qualification: Three-years-old and up
- Weight: 56 kg (3yo); 58 kg (4yo+); Allowances; 1½ kg for fillies and mares Penalties; 3 kg for Group 1 winners * 2 kg for Group 2 winners * * since January 1
- Purse: €200,000 (2021); 1st: €114,000

Prix Dollar
2025
First Look	Bay City Roller	Bright Picture

Previous years
2024
Jayarebe	Almaqam	Birr Castle
2022
Anmaat	Junko	West Wind Blows
2021
Dubai Honour	Magny Cours	Dawn Intello

2020-2011
2020
Skalleti	Patrick Sarsfield	Dariyma
2019
Skalleti	Mountain Angel	Line of Duty
2018
Alignement	Loxley	Fabricate
2017
Garlingari	Subway Dancer	Salouen
2016
Potemkin	Heshem	Zarak
2015
Free Port Lux	Fractional	Air Pilot
2014
Fractional	Hippy	Calling Out
2013
Cirrus Des Aigles	Mandour	Petit Chevalier
2012
Cirrus Des Aigles	Hunter's Light	Saga Dream
2011
Byword	Cirrus Des Aigles	Shimraan

2010-2001
2010
Cirrus Des Aigles	Budai	Distant Memories
2009
Pipedreamer	Gris De Gris	Famous Name
2008
Trincot	Loup Breton	The Bogberry
2007
Musical Way	Loup Breton	Boris De Deauville
2006
Soldier Hollow	Manduro	Boris De Deauville
2005
Touch Of Land	Ruwi	Runaway
2004
Touch Of Land	Gateman	Special Kaldoun
2003
Weightless	Short Pause	Execute
2002
Dano-Mast	Binary File	Eagle Cafe
2001
Albarahin	Chancellor	King Of Tara

2000-1991
2000
Slickly	Albarahin	Adilabad
1999
State Shinto	Strategic	Kabool
1998
Insatiable	Handsome Ridge	Eco Friendly
1997
Alhaarth	Lord Cromby	Visionary
1996
Flemensfirth	Percutant	El Angelo
1995
Flemensfirth	Volochine	Triarius
1994
Alderbrook	Volochine	Frenchpark
1993
Knifebox	Fanmore	Marildo
1992
Sillery	Wiorno	Corrupt
1991
Wiorno	Muroto	Stagecraft

1990-1988
1990
Agent Bleu	Pirate Army	Filago
1989
Creator	Hello Calder	Val Des Bois
1988
Squill	Genereux Genie	Jalaajel

The Prix Dollar is a Group 2 flat horse race in France open to thoroughbreds aged three years or older. It is run at Longchamp over a distance of 1,950 metres (about 1 mile and 1¾ furlongs), and it is scheduled to take place each year in late September or early October.

== History ==
The event is named after Dollar, a successful racehorse and sire in the 19th century. It was established in 1905, and was initially contested over 3,500 metres in the autumn. It was moved to the spring and cut to 2,200 metres in 1909. It was abandoned throughout World War I, with no running from 1915 to 1918.

In 1934, the race was titled the Prix du Centenaire to commemorate the centenary of the sport's main governing body at that time, the Société d'Encouragement. The Prix du Centenaire was a 2,100-metre handicap with a prize of 318,600 francs.

The Prix Dollar was cancelled from 1940 to 1943 because of World War II. It was staged at Le Tremblay with a distance of 2,150 metres in 1944 and 1945. For a period it was restricted to horses aged four or older.

The race was shortened to 2,000 metres in 1957, and extended to 2,250 metres in 1958. It reverted to 2,000 metres in 1960, and was held at Chantilly in 1965 and 1966. A new distance of 1,950 metres was introduced in 1969.

The Prix Dollar was run at Chantilly's Prix du Jockey Club meeting over 2,000 metres in 1986. It was switched to Longchamp's late September fixture in 1987. It was opened to three-year-olds and moved to the Saturday of Prix de l'Arc de Triomphe weekend in 1988. The latter race is traditionally held on the first Sunday of October.

== Records ==
Most successful horse (3 wins):

- Cirrus des Aigles – 2010, 2012, 2013

Leading jockey (6 wins):

- Freddie Palmer – Priolo (1949), Flocon (1950), Violaine (1951), Montaval (1957), Javelot (1960), Fast Dip (1964)

Leading trainer (7 wins):

- Percy Carter – Kiss Curl (1938), Le Temeraire (1939), Priolo (1949), Flocon (1950), Violaine (1951), Javelot (1960), Fast Dip (1964)
- André Fabre – Al Nasr (1982), Mourtazam (1984), Creator (1989), Wiorno (1991), State Shinto (1999), Byword (2011), Fractional (2014)

Leading owner (5 wins):

- Sheikh Mohammed – Creator (1989), Knifebox (1993), Flemensfirth (1995, 1996), State Shinto (1999)

== Winners since 1974 ==
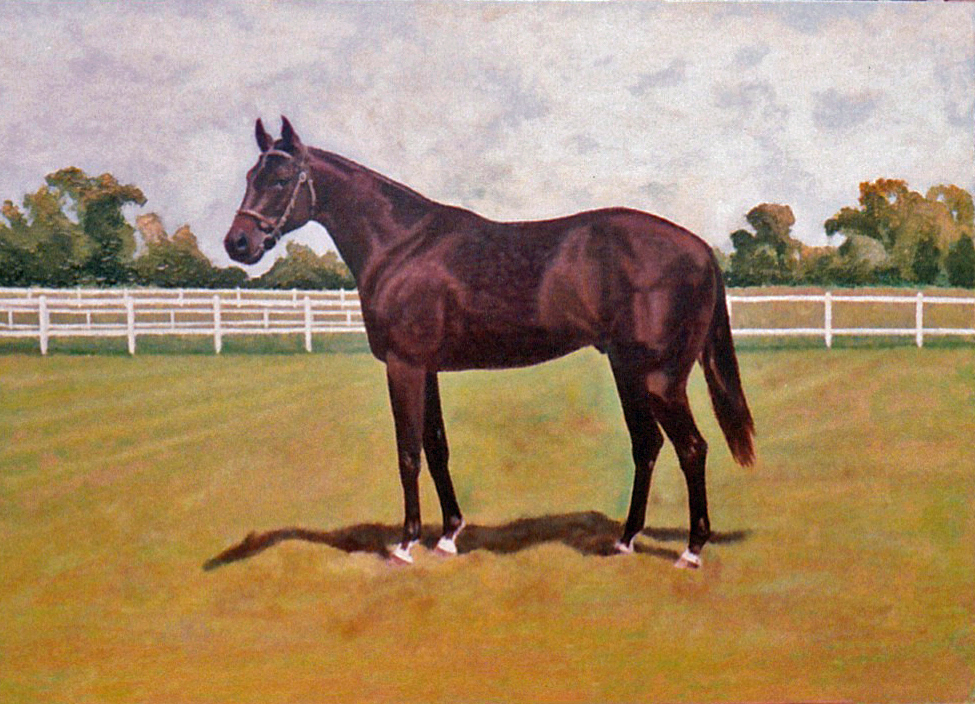
Trepan, winner in 1977, oil on canvas painted by Bob Demuyser (1920–2003)

Year	Winner	Age	Jockey	Trainer	Owner	Time
1974	Margouillat	4	Gérard Rivases	Robert de Mony-Pajol	Paul de Moussac	2:02.80
1975	Allez France	5	Yves Saint-Martin	Angel Penna	Daniel Wildenstein
1976	Kasteel	4	Tony Murray	J. M. de Choubersky	Thierry van Zuylen	2:05.90
1977	Trepan	5	Philippe Paquet	François Boutin	Rodolph Schafer	2:05.80
1978	Trillion	4	Lester Piggott	Maurice Zilber	Hunt / Stephenson	1:59.90
1979	Trillion	5	Lester Piggott	Maurice Zilber	Hunt / Stephenson	2:10.70
1980	Northern Baby	4	Philippe Paquet	François Boutin	Anne-Marie d'Estainville
1981	P'tite Tete	5	Gérard Dubroeucq	Gilles Delloye	André Desprez	2:08.50
1982	Al Nasr	4	Alfred Gibert	André Fabre	Moufid Dabaghi	1:59.30
1983	Welsh Term	4	Yves Saint-Martin	Robert Collet	Owen Helman	2:03.00
1984	Mourtazam	6	Pascal Bodin	André Fabre	Moufid Dabaghi	2:08.00
1985	Yashgan	4	Yves Saint-Martin	Alain de Royer-Dupré	HH Aga Khan IV	2:00.90
1986	Iades	4	Freddy Head	François Boutin	Niccolò Incisa Rocchetta	2:00.70
1987	Takfa Yahmed	4	Alfred Gibert	Mitri Saliba	Mahmoud Fustok	2:04.60
1988	Squill	3	Guy Guignard	Criquette Head	Etti Plesch	2:02.40
1989	Creator	3	Cash Asmussen	André Fabre	Sheikh Mohammed	2:04.10
1990	Agent Bleu	3	Dominique Boeuf	Élie Lellouche	Daniel Wildenstein	2:05.90
1991	Wiorno	3	Thierry Jarnet	André Fabre	Daniel Wildenstein	2:04.00
1992	Sillery	4	Freddy Head	Criquette Head	Ghislaine Head	2:11.60
1993	Knifebox	5	Michael Roberts	John Gosden	Sheikh Mohammed	2:07.70
1994	Alderbrook	5	Paul Eddery	Julie Cecil	Ernie Pick	2:04.60
1995	Flemensfirth	3	Frankie Dettori	John Gosden	Sheikh Mohammed	2:07.80
1996	Flemensfirth	4	Frankie Dettori	John Gosden	Sheikh Mohammed	2:07.70
1997	Alhaarth	4	Frankie Dettori	Saeed bin Suroor	Godolphin	1:59.20
1998	Insatiable	5	Olivier Peslier	Sir Michael Stoute	Sir Evelyn de Rothschild	2:07.70
1999	State Shinto	3	Thierry Jarnet	André Fabre	Sheikh Mohammed	2:19.00
2000	Slickly	4	Frankie Dettori	Saeed bin Suroor	Godolphin	1:59.30
2001	Albarahin	6	Richard Hills	Marcus Tregoning	Hamdan Al Maktoum	2:10.50
2002	Dano-Mast	6	Olivier Peslier	Flemming Poulsen	Composit / Mosehøj	2:01.60
2003	Weightless	3	Thierry Thulliez	Pascal Bary	Khalid Abdullah	2:05.40
2004	Touch of Land	4	Christophe Lemaire	Henri-Alex Pantall	Gary Tanaka	1:58.30
2005	Touch of Land	5	Christophe Lemaire	Henri-Alex Pantall	Gary Tanaka	2:04.40
2006	Soldier Hollow	6	Olivier Peslier	Peter Schiergen	Gestüt Park Wiedingen	1:59.40
2007	Musical Way	5	Ronan Thomas	Philippe van de Poele	S. Constantinidis	2:04.20
2008	Trincot	3	Ioritz Mendizabal	Philippe Demercastel	Ecurie Bader	2:03.50
2009	Pipedreamer	5	Dominique Boeuf	John Gosden	Cheveley Park Stud	2:00.30
2010	Cirrus des Aigles	4	Franck Blondel	Corine Barande-Barbe	Jean-Claude Dupouy	2:09.60
2011	Byword	5	Maxime Guyon	André Fabre	Khalid Abdullah	2:00.41
2012	Cirrus des Aigles	6	Olivier Peslier	Corine Barande-Barbe	Jean-Claude Dupouy	2:07.95
2013	Cirrus des Aigles	7	Christophe Soumillon	Corine Barande-Barbe	Jean-Claude Dupouy	2:07.95
2014	Fractional (Note: Cirrus des Aigles finished first in 2014, but he was relegated to fifth place for interference)	5	Raphael Marchelli	André Fabre	Godolphin	2:05.78
2015	Free Port Lux	4	Thierry Jarnet	Freddy Head	Olivier Thomas	1:59.58
2016	Potemkin (Note: The 2016 & 2017 races took place at Chantilly while Longchamp was closed for redevelopment)	5	Eduardo Pedroza	Andreas Wöhler	Allofs / Fahrhof	2:06.54
2017	Garlingari	6	Stéphane Pasquier	Corine Barande-Barbe	Corine Barande-Barbe	2:04.48
2018	Alignement	5	Maxime Guyon	Carlos Laffon-Parias	Wertheimer et Frère	2:02.23
2019	Skalleti	4	Pierre-Charles Boudot	Jerome Reynier	Jean-Claude Seroul	2:06.56
2020	Skalleti	5	Maxime Guyon	Jerome Reynier	Jean-Claude Seroul	2:10.41
2021	Dubai Honour	3	James Doyle	William Haggas	Mohamed Obaida	2:08.14
2022	Anmaat	4	Jim Crowley	Owen Burrows	Shadwell Estate	2:05.37
2023	Horizon Dore	3	Mickael Barzalona	Patrice Cottier	Gousserie Racing, Ecurie Du Sud Et Al	1:59.86
2024	Jayarebe	3	Sean Levey	Brian Meehan	Iraj Parvizi	2:04.63
2025	First Look	4	Mickael Barzalona	André Fabre	Wathnan Racing	2:05.61
2026	Wimbledon Hawkeye	4	Christophe Soumillon	George Scott	Victorious Forever	2:00.23

== Earlier winners ==
- 1905: Gouvernant
- 1906: Kazbek
- 1907: Eider / Procope (Note: The 1907 race was a dead-heat and has joint winners)
- 1908: Arga
- 1909: Biniou
- 1910: Sea Sick
- 1911: Italus
- 1912: Basse Pointe
- 1913: El Tango
- 1914: Mon Petiot
- 1915–18: no race
- 1919: Samourai
- 1920: King's Cross
- 1921: Zagreus
- 1922: Zagreus
- 1923: Grillemont
- 1924: Premontre
- 1925: Lotus Lily
- 1926: Inaudi
- 1927: Rialto
- 1928: Bacchus
- 1929: Renardine
- 1930: Sulpicio
- 1931: Picaflor
- 1932: Tchang Ti
- 1933: Bracken
- 1934: Pulcherrimus
- 1935: Amontillado
- 1936: Cerealiste
- 1937: Dilemne
- 1938: Kiss Curl
- 1939: Le Temeraire
- 1940–43: no race
- 1944: Alfaraz
- 1945:
- 1946: Kerlor
- 1947: Hassan
- 1948: Goody
- 1949: Priolo
- 1950: Flocon
- 1951: Violaine
- 1952: Free Man
- 1953:
- 1954: Marcilly
- 1955: Le Geographe
- 1956: Tribord
- 1957: Montaval
- 1958: Apostol
- 1959: Hamanet
- 1960: Javelot
- 1961: Bondolfi
- 1962: Bondolfi
- 1963: Wild Hun
- 1964: Fast Dip
- 1965: Corfinio
- 1966: Tajubena
- 1967: Great Nephew
- 1968: Grandier
- 1969: Semillant
- 1970: Priamos
- 1971: Caro
- 1972: Sharapour
- 1973: Gift Card

== See also ==
- List of French flat horse races
