= Eclair au Chocolat =

French-bred Thoroughbred racehorse

- Sire: Bubbles
- Grandsire: La Farina
- Dam: Honey Sweet
- Damsire: Kircubbin
- Sex: Stallion
- Foaled: 1935
- Country: France
- Colour: Bay
- Breeder: Édouard de Rothschild
- Owner: Édouard de Rothschild
- Trainer: Lucien Robert
- Record: 7: 5-1-0

Major wins
- Grand Prix de la Ville de Vichy (1938); Prix Royal Oak (1938); Prix de l'Arc de Triomphe (1938)

Eclair au Chocolat (1935 – ca. 1945) was a French Thoroughbred racehorse and sire. As a three-year-old he won the Grand Prix de la Ville de Vichy and then established himself as one of the best of a strong generation of European horses with wins in the Prix Royal Oak and the Prix de l'Arc de Triomphe. After retiring to stud in 1939 he was taken to Germany during the Occupation of France. His final fate is unknown.

== Background ==
Eclair au Chocolat was a big, brown horse bred in France by his owner Edouard Alphonse de Rothschild. He was the best horse sired by Bubbles who won the Prix Lupin and the Prix du Président de la République for Rothschild in 1928 and 1929 and was Leading sire in France in 1938. Eclair au Chocolat's dam Honey Sweet was a daughter of Honeysuckle, whose wins included the Prix de Pomone and the Prix de Malleret. Honeysuckle was descended from the broodmare Charlotte Russe, making her a distant relative of Gallahadion and La Farina.

During his racing career Eclair au Chocolat and was ridden in his major races by Charles Bouillon. He was usually restrained in the early stages before being produced with a late run and was reported to be immensely popular with the French racing public.

== Racing career ==
=== 1938: three-year-old season ===
In the spring of 1938 Eclair au Chocolat contested the Prix Matchem over 1800 metres at Le Tremblay and finished second to the Prix de Condé winner Castel Fusano. In July he was matched against older horses over 2600 metres in the Grand Prix de la Ville de Vichy and recorded his first major success.

On 18 September Eclair au Chocolat contested the Prix Royal-Oak over 3000 metres at Longchamp Racecourse and won from Castel Fusano and Cannot, a colt who had previously finished second in both the Prix du Jockey Club and the Grand Prix de Paris (to Nearco). The colt's win gave Rothschild a record fifth win in the race.

On 9 October Eclair au Chocolat started the 2.6/1 favourite against nine opponents for the nineteenth running of the Prix de l'Arc de Triomphe over 2400 metres at Longchamp Racecourse. Ridden by Charles Bouillon, he won by two lengths from Antonym, with Cannot half a length away in third place.

== Stud record ==
Eclair au Chocolat was entered in the 1939 Ascot Gold Cup but was retired from racing to become a breeding stallion at the Haras de Meautry. Following the Fall of France in 1940 he was reportedly taken to Germany and stood at the Graditz and Altefeld Studs until 1945. He disappeared from the record at the end of the Second World War.

== Assessment ==
At the end of 1938, Eclair au Chocolat was regarded as one of the best horses of his generation, alongside Nearco, Rockfel and Bois Roussel. The Australian jockey Rae Johnstone (who rode Cannot), reportedly regarded him as potentially the best stayer since Phar Lap.

In their book A Century of Champions, based on a modified version of the Timeform system, John Randall and Tony Morris rated Eclair au Chocolat a "superior" winner of the Prix de l'Arc de Triomphe. They rated him the one hundred and forty-fifth best racehorse of twentieth century, the thirtieth best horse of the century to have been trained in France, and the second best horse foaled in 1935, behind Nearco.

== Pedigree ==
Pedigree of Eclair au Chocolat (FR), brown stallion, 1935
Sire Bubbles (FR) 1925	La Farina (FR); 1911	Sans Souci*	Le Roi Soleil*
Sire Bubbles (FR) 1925	La Farina (FR); 1911	Sans Souci*	Sanctimony*
Sire Bubbles (FR) 1925	La Farina (FR); 1911	Malatesta	Isinglass
Sire Bubbles (FR) 1925	La Farina (FR); 1911	Malatesta	Parisina
Sire Bubbles (FR) 1925	Spring Cleaning (FR); 1915	Neil Gow	Marco
Sire Bubbles (FR) 1925	Spring Cleaning (FR); 1915	Neil Gow	Chelandry
Sire Bubbles (FR) 1925	Spring Cleaning (FR); 1915	Spring Night	Chesterfield
Sire Bubbles (FR) 1925	Spring Cleaning (FR); 1915	Spring Night	Silent Night
Dam Honey Sweet (FR) 1927	Kircubbin (GB); 1918	Captivation	Cyllene
Dam Honey Sweet (FR) 1927	Kircubbin (GB); 1918	Captivation	Charm
Dam Honey Sweet (FR) 1927	Kircubbin (GB); 1918	Avon Hack	Hackler
Dam Honey Sweet (FR) 1927	Kircubbin (GB); 1918	Avon Hack	Avonbeg
Dam Honey Sweet (FR) 1927	Honeysuckle (FR); 1919	Bay Cherry	Bay Ronald
Dam Honey Sweet (FR) 1927	Honeysuckle (FR); 1919	Bay Cherry	Saintfield
Dam Honey Sweet (FR) 1927	Honeysuckle (FR); 1919	Honey	Sans Souci*
Dam Honey Sweet (FR) 1927	Honeysuckle (FR); 1919	Honey	Ambrosine (Family: 4-e)

* Eclair au Chocolat is inbred 3S x 4D to the stallion Sans Souci, meaning that he appears third generation on the sire side of his pedigree, and fourth generation on the dam side of his pedigree.
