= Prix La Rochette =

- Class: Group 3
- Location: Longchamp Racecourse; Paris, France
- Inaugurated: 1882
- Race type: Flat / Thoroughbred
- Website: france-galop.com

Race information
- Distance: 1,400 metres (7f)
- Surface: Turf
- Track: Right-handed
- Qualification: Two-year-olds excluding Group 1 winners
- Weight: 56 kg Allowances; 1½ kg for fillies Penalties; 2 kg for Group 2 winners 2 kg if two Group 3 wins 1 kg if one Group 3 win
- Purse: €80,000 (2021); 1st: €40,000

Prix La Rochette
2024
Houquetot	Heybetli	Revolutionnaire

Previous years
2023
Beauvatier	Evade	Havana Cigar
2022
Tigrais	Breizh Sky	Gamestop
2021
Acer Alley	Making Moovies	El Bodegon

2020-2011
2020
Go Athletico	Sealiway	Naval Crown
2019
Kenway	Wooded	Sujet Libre
2018
The Black Album	Toijk	Ecolo
2017
Glorious Journey	Feralia	Camera Face
2016
Kontrastat	Mate Story	Baileys Showgirl
2015
Attendu	Lawmaking	Omar Bradley
2014
Full Mast	Nucifera	Territories
2013
Karakontie	Decathlete	Stillman
2012
What A Name	Avantage	Pearl Flute
2011
Sofast	Mac Row	American Devil

2010-2001
2010
My Name Is Bond	Hung Parliament	Maiguri
2009
Buzzword	Siyouni	Eightfold Path
2008
Soul City	Milanais	Jukebox Jury
2007
Young Pretender	Shediak	Stern Opinion
2006
Visionario	Holocene	Cicerole
2005
Multiplex	Attima	Kakofonic
2004
Early March	Stop Making Sense	Osidy
2003
Diamond Green	Charming Prince	Ershaad
2002
Le Vie Dei Colori	Il Barone	Zanyboy
2001
Guys And Dolls	Bernebeau	Kifissos

2000-1990
2000
Okawango	Vahorimix	Lucayan Chief
1999
Ocean Of Wisdom	Boutron	Just A Poser
1998
Slickly	Irish Prize	Rhapsodist
1997
Pinmix	Trans Island	Arnaqueur
1996
Fine Fellow	Alpha Plus	Speedfriend
1995
Le Triton	Cliptomania	Radevore
1994
Indian Jones	Goldmark	Grand Monarque
1993
Chimes Band	Sunshack	Lost World
1992
Kadounor	Marchand De Sable	Seaton Delaval
1991
Steinbeck	Rainbow Corner	Break Bread
1990
Beau Sultan	Eternity Star	Acteur Francais

The Prix La Rochette is a Group 3 flat horse race in France open to two-year-old thoroughbreds. It is run at Longchamp over a distance of 1,400 metres (about 7 furlongs), and it is scheduled to take place each year in September.

== History ==
The event was originally part of a series called the Prix Triennal. The first leg, the precursor of the modern version, was introduced in 1882. The second, for three-year-olds, began in 1883, and the third, for four-year-olds, in 1884. Each was restricted to horses owned by the breeder who foaled them. The races were initially held at Fontainebleau, and the juvenile division was contested over 1,100 metres.

The Prix Triennal was renamed in memory of Charles de La Rochette (1820–1889), a long-serving steward of the Société d'Encouragement, in 1889. It moved to Longchamp in 1892, and the two-year-old leg was cut to 1,000 metres. It reverted to 1,100 metres in 1893.

The series switched to Chantilly in 1906, and from this point the two and three-year-old parts were split into separate divisions for colts and fillies. They were abandoned during World War I, but substitutes were held at Maisons-Laffitte in 1918. The series returned to Longchamp in 1919, and to Chantilly in 1920. It was staged at Deauville in 1922, and on this occasion the juvenile legs were run over 1,000 metres. It resumed at Chantilly in 1923, and the split-race format continued until 1929.

The Prix La Rochette was cancelled three times during World War II, in 1939, 1940 and 1944. It was transferred to Longchamp with a new distance of 1,000 metres in 1941, and temporarily switched to Le Tremblay in 1943. In the post-war years it was usually held at Longchamp, but there were short periods at Chantilly (1947, 1,100 metres), Deauville (1955) and Chantilly again (1957–1959).

The distance of the race was progressively increased during the late 1960s. There were brief spells at 1,300 metres (1966–67), 1,400 metres (1968) and 1,500 metres (1969), before a sustained period over 1,600 metres began in 1970.

The Prix La Rochette was restricted to male horses from 1995 to 1999, and it was run at Chantilly from 1997 to 2000. It returned to Longchamp with a length of 1,400 metres in 2001.

== Records ==
Leading jockey (8 wins):

- George Stern – Farnus (1901), Val d'Or (1904), Sidia (1906), Azalee (1908), Dagor (1912), Marka (1912), Mousse de Mer (1913), Banstar (1925)

Leading trainer (10 wins):

- Robert Denman – Farnus (1901), Gouvernant (1903), Val d'Or (1904), Sidia (1906), Azalee (1908), Dagor (1912), Marka (1912), Mousse de Mer (1913), Banstar (1925), Esclarmonde (1926)
- François Boutin – Neptunium (1971), Banjer (1973), Le Marmot (1978), Un Reitre (1979), Vorias (1980), Persepolis (1981), L'Emigrant (1982), Pasakos (1987), Linamix (1989), Indian Jones (1994)

Leading owner (10 wins):

- Edmond Blanc – Marly (1892), Lucie (1899), Farnus (1901), Gouvernant (1903), Val d'Or (1904), Sidia (1906), Azalee (1908), Dagor (1912), Marka (1912), Mousse de Mer (1913)

== Winners since 1979 ==
Year	Winner	Jockey	Trainer	Owner	Time
1979	Un Reitre	Philippe Paquet	François Boutin	Stavros Niarchos
1980	Vorias	Philippe Paquet	François Boutin	Peter Goulandris
1981	Persepolis	Philippe Paquet	François Boutin	Stavros Niarchos
1982	L'Emigrant	Lester Piggott	François Boutin	Stavros Niarchos	1:40.80
1983	Cariellor	Yves Saint-Martin	André Fabre	Suzy Volterra
1984	No Pass No Sale	Alfred Gibert	Robert Collet	René Aubert	1:48.70
1985	Kadrou	Alfred Gibert	Jean Laumain	Henri Rabatel
1986	Grand Chelem	Yves Saint-Martin	Robert Collet	Richard Strauss
1987	Pasakos	Freddy Head	François Boutin	Niccolò Incisa Rocchetta
1988	Local Talent	Cash Asmussen	André Fabre	Sheikh Mohammed	1:43.20
1989	Linamix	Gérald Mossé	François Boutin	Jean-Luc Lagardère	1:41.20
1990	Beau Sultan	Freddy Head	Criquette Head	Ghislaine Head	1:39.30
1991	Steinbeck ^{[a]}	Steve Cauthen	André Fabre	Sheikh Mohammed	1:38.90
1992	Kadounor	Guy Guignard	Jean Laumain	Henri Rabatel	1:45.10
1993	Chimes Band	Dominique Boeuf	Pascal Bary	Ecurie I. M. Fares	1:48.90
1994	Indian Jones	Cash Asmussen	François Boutin	Edouard de Rothschild	1:45.70
1995	Le Triton	Walter Swinburn	Criquette Head	Maktoum Al Maktoum	1:46.40
1996	Fine Fellow	Freddy Head	Criquette Head	Maktoum Al Maktoum	1:48.80
1997	Pinmix	Alain Junk	André Fabre	Jean-Luc Lagardère	1:38.80
1998	Slickly	Olivier Peslier	André Fabre	Jean-Luc Lagardère	1:40.10
1999	Ocean of Wisdom	Cash Asmussen	Pascal Bary	Niarchos Family	1:48.50
2000	Okawango	Olivier Doleuze	Criquette Head	Wertheimer et Frère	1:41.45
2001	Guys and Dolls	Christophe Soumillon	Paul Cole	Anthony Speelman	1:21.10
2002	Le Vie dei Colori	Thierry Thulliez	Roberto Brogi	Scuderia Archi Romani	1:21.10
2003	Diamond Green	Christophe Soumillon	André Fabre	Lagardère Family	1:22.50
2004	Early March	Olivier Peslier	Criquette Head-Maarek	Khalid Abdullah	1:22.20
2005	Multiplex ^{[b]}	Christophe Soumillon	André Fabre	Khalid Abdullah	1:23.80
2006	Visionario	Christophe Soumillon	André Fabre	HH Aga Khan IV	1:23.80
2007	Young Pretender	Frankie Dettori	John Gosden	Princess Haya of Jordan	1:21.90
2008	Soul City	Richard Hughes	Richard Hannon Sr.	Patrick Fahey	1:22.70
2009	Buzzword	Ahmed Ajtebi	Saeed bin Suroor	Godolphin	1:22.83
2010	My Name Is Bond	Christophe Soumillon	Jean-Claude Rouget	Daniel-Yves Trèves	1:20.50
2011	Sofast	Olivier Peslier	Freddy Head	Wertheimer et Frère	1:25.24
2012	What a Name	Christophe Lemaire	Mikel Delzangles	Mohammed bin Khalifa Al Thani	1:22.07
2013	Karakontie	Olivier Peslier	Jonathan Pease	Niarchos Family	1:22.45
2014	Full Mast	Thierry Thulliez	Criquette Head-Maarek	Khalid Abdullah	1:25.38
2015	Attendu	Maxime Guyon	Carlos Laffon-Parias	Wertheimer et Frère	1:22.74
2016	Kontrastat^{[c]}	Theo Bachelot	Stephane Wattel	Plainfosse / Palos de Moguer	1:25.35
2017	Glorious Journey^{[c]}	James Doyle	Charlie Appleby	HH Sheikha Al Jalila Racing	1:26.42
2018	The Black Album	Mickael Barzalona	Jane Soubagne	Didier Bouquil	1:24.86
2019	Kenway	Theo Bachelot	Frederic Rossi	Le Haras De La Gousserie	1:20.35
2020	Go Athletico	Aurelien Lemaitre	Philippe Decouz	Tanguy Moreux, Sas Racing et al.	1:21.83
2021	Acer Alley	Olivier Peslier	Francis-Henri Graffard	Merry Fox Stud Ltd	1:24.04
2022	Tigrais	Aurelien Lemaitre	Christopher Head	Gerard Augustin-Normand & OTI Racing	1:20.03
2023	Beauvatier	Maxime Guyon	Yann Barberot	Philippe Allaire & Haras D'Etreham	1:22.28

^{a} Rainbow Corner finished first in 1991, but he was relegated to second place following a stewards' inquiry.
^{b} Yasoodd was first in 2005, but he was placed fourth after a stewards' inquiry.
^{c} The 2016 & 2017 races were run at Saint-Cloud while Longchamp was closed for redevelopment.

== Earlier winners ==
=== 1882–1905 ===
- 1882: Satory
- 1883: Yvrande
- 1884: Barberine
- 1885: Jupin
- 1886: Arlay
- 1887: Stuart
- 1888: Criniere
- 1889:
- 1890: Clairon
- 1891: Chene Royal
- 1892: Marly
- 1893: Dolma Baghtche
- 1894: Montlhery
- 1895: Brunehilde
- 1896: Roxelane
- 1897: Madagascar
- 1898: Franco-Russe
- 1899: Lucie
- 1900: Eryx
- 1901: Farnus
- 1902: Reine Margot
- 1903: Gouvernant
- 1904: Val d'Or
- 1905: Sly Fox

=== 1906–1929 (colts' division) ===
- 1906: Calomel
- 1907: Schuyler
- 1908: Hag to Hag
- 1909: Ulm
- 1910: Manfred
- 1911: Petulance
- 1912: Dagor
- 1913: La Farina
- 1914–17: no race
- 1918: Observateur
- 1919: Odol
- 1920: Arbre Sec
- 1921: Sombrero
- 1922: São Paulo
- 1923: Scaramouche
- 1924: Lezignan
- 1925: Banstar
- 1926: Andorra
- 1927: Seymour
- 1928: Rosolio
- 1929: Pearlash

=== 1906–1929 (fillies' division) ===
- 1906: Sidia
- 1907: Scabieuse
- 1908: Azalee
- 1909: Urgulosa
- 1910: Brume
- 1911: Qu'elle Est Belle
- 1912: Marka
- 1913: Mousse de Mer
- 1914–17: no race
- 1918: Stearine
- 1919: La Chiffa
- 1920: Farthing
- 1921: Hyperite
- 1922: Pomare
- 1923: Carnation
- 1924: Canalette
- 1925: Solette
- 1926: Esclarmonde
- 1927: Roahouga
- 1928: Necklace
- 1929: Swiss Miss

=== 1930–1978 ===
- 1930: Pearl Cap
- 1931: La Bourrasque
- 1932: Negundo
- 1933: Cingalaise
- 1934: Aromate
- 1935: Mistress Ford
- 1936: Catherinette
- 1937: Shrew
- 1938: Canzoni
- 1939–40: no race
- 1941: Esmeralda
- 1942: Caravelle / Dogat *
- 1943: Le Volcan
- 1944: no race
- 1945: Tourmente
- 1946: Djelal
- 1947: Balle Negre
- 1948: Musette
- 1949: Janus
- 1950: La Taglioni
- 1951: Luzon
- 1952: Cobalt
- 1953: Ferriol
- 1954: Tactic
- 1955: Belle Epoque
- 1956: Franc Luron
- 1957: Nubile
- 1958: Iadwiga
- 1959: Hautain
- 1960: Cocomel
- 1961: La Sega
- 1962: Wideawake
- 1963: Takawalk
- 1964: Shamirah
- 1965: Silver Shark
- 1966: Monatrea
- 1967: Vent du Nord
- 1968: Mia Pola
- 1969:
- 1970: Dictus
- 1971: Neptunium
- 1972: Satingo
- 1973: Banjer
- 1974: Dandy Lute
- 1975: Monsieur Dian
- 1976: Command Freddy
- 1977: River Knight
- 1978: Le Marmot

* The 1942 race was a dead-heat and has joint winners.

== See also ==
- List of French flat horse races
- Recurring sporting events established in 1882 – this race is included under its original title, Prix Triennal.
