= Ocean of Wisdom =

French-bred Thoroughbred racehorse

- Sire: Mr. Prospector
- Grandsire: Raise a Native
- Dam: Coup de Folie
- Damsire: Halo
- Sex: Stallion
- Foaled: 1997
- Country: France
- Colour: Bay
- Breeder: Flaxman Holdings Ltd.
- Owner: Niarchos family
- Trainer: Pascal Bary
- Record: 5: 1-0-2
- Earnings: $87,079

Major wins
- Prix La Rochette (2010)

Ocean of Wisdom (born March 8, 1997) is a retired Thoroughbred racehorse, bred by the Niarchos family, who also bred champion race horses such as Bago, Dream Well, Miesque, Six Perfections and Divine Proportions.

His sire is top stallion Mr. Prospector. Ocean of Wisdom's dam is Coup de Folie, herself a group one winner and dam of three G1 winners in Machiavellian, Exit to Nowhere and Coup de Genie.

During his racing career, Ocean of Wisdom was trained by Pascal Bary and ridden by Cash Asmussen. Ocean of Wisdom was a Group 3 winner as a two-year-old, winning the Prix La Rochette. His racing career ended after five races due to an injury during training, and he was retired to stud at Niarchos family's Haras de Fresnay-le-Buffard, where he continues to stand.

== Pedigree ==
Pedigree of Ocean of Wisdom
Sire Mr. Prospector	Raise a Native	Native Dancer	Polynesian
Sire Mr. Prospector	Raise a Native	Native Dancer	Geisha
Sire Mr. Prospector	Raise a Native	Raise You	Case Ace
Sire Mr. Prospector	Raise a Native	Raise You	Lady Glory
Sire Mr. Prospector	Gold Digger	Nashua	Nasrullah
Sire Mr. Prospector	Gold Digger	Nashua	Seegula
Sire Mr. Prospector	Gold Digger	Sequence	Count Fleet
Sire Mr. Prospector	Gold Digger	Sequence	Miss Dogwood
Dam Coup de Folie	Halo	Hail to Reason	Turn-To
Dam Coup de Folie	Halo	Hail to Reason	Nothird Chance
Dam Coup de Folie	Halo	Cosmah	Cosmic Bomb
Dam Coup de Folie	Halo	Cosmah	Almahmoud
Dam Coup de Folie	Raise the Standard	Hoist The Flag	Tom Rolfe
Dam Coup de Folie	Raise the Standard	Hoist The Flag	Wavy Navy
Dam Coup de Folie	Raise the Standard	Natalma	Native Dancer
Dam Coup de Folie	Raise the Standard	Natalma	Almahmoud
