= Prix Gontaut-Biron =

Group 3 flat horse race in France

- Class: Group 3
- Location: Deauville Racecourse; Deauville, France
- Inaugurated: 1919
- Race type: Flat / Thoroughbred
- Sponsor: Hong Kong Jockey Club
- Website: france-galop.com

Race information
- Distance: 2,000 metres (1¼ miles)
- Surface: Turf
- Track: Right-handed
- Qualification: Four-years-old and up exc. G1 winners this year
- Weight: 57 kg Allowances; 1½ kg for fillies and mares 1 kg if not Group placed * Penalties; 3 kg for Group 2 winners * 3 kg if two Group 3 wins * 1½ kg if one Group 3 win * * since January 1
- Purse: €80,000 (2022); 1st: €40,000

Prix Gontaut-Biron
2025
First Look	Goliath	Woodchuck

Previous years
2024
Al Hakeem	Woodchuck	Elusive Princess
2023
Place Du Carrousel	Bolthole	Monty
2022
Wally	Majestic Dawn	Monty
2021
Wally	Monty	Algiers

2020-2011
2020
Skalleti	Sottsass	Motamarris
2019
Olmedo	Mountain Angel	Trais Fluors
2018
Talismanic	First Sitting	Master's Spirit
2017
First Sitting	Garlingari	Zafiro
2016
New Bay	Arthenus	Garlingari
2015
Bello Matteo	Free Port Lux	Travertine
2014
Cocktail Queen	Nicolosio	Pilote
2013
Petit Chevalier	Cirrus Des Aigles	Smoking Sun
2012
Don Bosco	Sagramor	Saga Dream
2011
Cirrus Des Aigles	Lancelot	Skins Game

2010-2001
2010
Vision D'Etat	Budai	Cirrus Des Aigles
2009
Crossharbour	Adelar	Precious Boy
2008
Boris De Deauville	Crossharbour	Eradicate
2007
Echo Of Light	Atlantic Air	Kocab
2006
Atlantic Air	Musketier	Annenkov
2005
Sweet Stream	Apsis	Special Kaldoun
2004
Demon Dancer	Kalabar	Pont D'Or
2003
Carnival Dancer	Without Connexion	Sunstrach
2002
Wellbeing	Sakhee	Sunstrach
2001
Slew The Red	Mocham Glen	Sobieski

2000-1990
2000
Agol Lack	Tijiyr	Kabool
1999
Dream Well	Trait De Genie	Res Judicata
1998
Running Stag	Garuda	Lord Of Men
1997
Lord Of Men	Si Seductor	Nero Zilzal
1996
Carling	Bal Harbour	Percutant
1995
Hernando	Freedom Cry	Millkom
1994
Hernando	Triarius	Beneficial
1993
Urban Sea	Verveine	Lucky Lindy
1992
Corrupt	Sillery	Half A Tick
1991
Muroto	Antisaar	Candy Glen
1990
Mister Riv	Relief Pitcher	Landyap

The Prix Gontaut-Biron is a Group 3 flat horse race in France open to thoroughbreds aged four years or older. It is run at Deauville over a distance of 2,000 metres (about 1¼ miles), and it is scheduled to take place each year in August.

== History ==
The event is named in memory of Antoine de Gontaut-Biron (died 1917), a member of the Société des Courses de Deauville, a former governing body at the venue. The race was established in 1919, and it was originally open to horses aged three or older. The inaugural running was contested over 1,600 metres, and it was extended to 2,400 metres in 1920.

Deauville Racecourse was closed during World War II, and the Prix Gontaut-Biron was cancelled in 1940. For the remainder of this period it was switched between Maisons-Laffitte (1941–43, 1945) and Auteuil (1944).

The distance of the race was increased to 2,600 metres in 1955, and cut to 2,000 metres in 1956. It was restored to 2,400 metres in 1958, and from this point the race was closed to three-year-olds. Its current spell over 2,000 metres began in 1964.

The Prix Gontaut-Biron has been sponsored by the Hong Kong Jockey Club since 2009.

== Records ==
Most successful horse (2 wins):

- Hernando – 1994, 1995
- Wally - 2021, 2022

Leading jockey (4 wins):

- Roger Brethès – Rabican (1927), Ping Pong (1935), Samovar (1936), Morosini (1941)
- Alfred Gibert – Jefferson (1971), Nemr (1981), Great Substence (1982), Arc (1987)
- Olivier Peslier – Agol Lack (2000), Slew the Red (2001), Carnival Dancer (2003), Vision d'Etat (2010)

Leading trainer (5 wins):

- André Fabre – Cariellor (1985), Agol Lack (2000), Slew the Red (2001), Crossharbour (2009), New Bay (2016)

Leading owner (3 wins):

- Ralph B. Strassburger – Berthe (1948), Montaval (1956), Rumesnil (1957)
- Mahmoud Fustok – Nemr (1981), Great Substence (1982), Over the Ocean (1986)
- Khalid Abdullah – General Holme (1983), Crossharbour (2009), New Bay (2016)

== Winners since 1979 ==
Year	Winner	Age	Jockey	Trainer	Owner	Time
1979	Rusticaro	4	Yves Saint-Martin	Richard Carver Jr.	Brendan Kelly
1980	Armistice Day	4	Yves Saint-Martin	C. de Watrigant	Luis Urbano Sanabria
1981	Nemr	4	Alfred Gibert	Mitri Saliba	Mahmoud Fustok
1982	Great Substence	4	Alfred Gibert	Mitri Saliba	Mahmoud Fustok
1983	General Holme	4	Freddy Head	Olivier Douieb	Khalid Abdullah
1984	Bedtime	4	Brian Taylor	Dick Hern	3rd Earl of Halifax
1985	Cariellor	4	Lester Piggott	André Fabre	Suzy Volterra
1986	Over the Ocean	4	Alain Badel	Georges Mikhalidès	Mahmoud Fustok
1987	Arc	4	Alfred Gibert	Peter Lautner	Stall Weissenhof
1988	Ruffle	4	Maurice Philipperon	Edouard Bartholomew	Sir Robin McAlpine	2:05.80
1989	Emmson	4	Willie Carson	Dick Hern	Sir Michael Sobell	2:10.40
1990	Mister Riv	5	Thierry Jarnet	Antonio Spanu	Jean-Bernard Fetoux	2:08.60
1991	Muroto	5	Gérald Mossé	François Boutin	Gerry Oldham	2:06.70
1992	Corrupt	4	Frankie Dettori	Peter Chapple-Hyam	Fathi Kalla	2:14.40
1993	Urban Sea	4	Cash Asmussen	Jean Lesbordes	David Tsui	2:06.30
1994	Hernando	4	Cash Asmussen	François Boutin	Stavros Niarchos	2:10.00
1995	Hernando	5	Cash Asmussen	John Hammond	Stavros Niarchos	2:07.30
1996	Carling	4	Thierry Thulliez	Corine Barande-Barbe	Teruya Yoshida	2:09.30
1997	Lord of Men	4	Sylvain Guillot	John Gosden	Sheikh Mohammed	2:08.60
1998	Running Stag	4	Ray Cochrane	Philip Mitchell	Richard Cohen	2:05.50
1999	Dream Well	4	Sylvain Guillot	Pascal Bary	Niarchos Family	2:20.4
2000	Agol Lack	4	Olivier Peslier	André Fabre	Sultan Al Kabeer	2:01.40
2001	Slew the Red	4	Olivier Peslier	André Fabre	Maktoum Al Maktoum	2:11.90
2002	Wellbeing	5	Thierry Thulliez	Pascal Bary	Plantation Stud	2:06.50
2003	Carnival Dancer	5	Olivier Peslier	Amanda Perrett	Cheveley Park Stud	2:10.00
2004	Special Kaldoun	5	Dominique Boeuf	David Smaga	Ecurie Chalhoub	2:13.20
2005	Sweet Stream	5	Stéphane Pasquier	John Hammond	Team Valor	2:07.90
2006	Atlantic Air	4	Thierry Thulliez	Yves de Nicolay	Antonia Devin	2:12.40
2007	Echo of Light	5	Frankie Dettori	Saeed bin Suroor	Godolphin	2:05.40
2008	Boris de Deauville	5	Dominique Boeuf	Stéphane Wattel	Bryant / Haegel	2:06.70
2009	Crossharbour	5	Stéphane Pasquier	André Fabre	Khalid Abdullah	2:04.00
2010	Vision d'Etat	5	Olivier Peslier	Eric Libaud	Detré / Libaud	2:12.10
2011	Cirrus des Aigles	5	Franck Blondel	Corine Barande-Barbe	J. C. A. Dupouy	2:08.60
2012	Don Bosco	5	Gregory Benoist	David Smaga	Omar El Sharif	2:06.29
2013	Petit Chevalier	5	Maxime Guyon	William Mongil	Rennstall Gestut Hachstee	2:08.00
2014	Cocktail Queen	4	Alexis Badel	Myriam Bollack-Badel	Jeff Smith	2:09.90
2015	Bello Matteo	4	Alexis Badel	Romain Le Gal	Rocco Stasi	2:07.50
2016	New Bay	4	Vincent Cheminaud	André Fabre	Khalid Abdullah	2:12.67
2017	First Sitting	6	Gérald Mossé	Chris Wall	Bringloe & Clarke	2:06.11
2018	Talismanic	5	Mickael Barzalona	André Fabre	Godolphin	2:09.72
2019	Olmedo	4	Cristian Demuro	Jean-Claude Rouget	Caro / Augustin-Normand	2:06.05
2020	Skalleti	5	Pierre-Charles Boudot	Jerome Reynier	Jean-Claude Seroul	2:12.51
2021	Wally	4	Cristian Demuro	Jean-Claude Rouget	Ecurie Jean-Pierre Barjon	2:07.27
2022	Wally	5	Cristian Demuro	Jean-Claude Rouget	Ecurie Jean-Pierre Barjon	2:06.16

== Earlier winners ==
- 1919: Saint Souplet
- 1920: Take a Step
- 1921: Nephthys
- 1922: Grillemont
- 1923: Keror
- 1924: Almaviva
- 1925: Cerfeuil
- 1926: Aethelstan
- 1927: Rabican
- 1928: Huntersdale
- 1929: Grock
- 1930: Hotweed
- 1931: Folio
- 1932: Bievres
- 1933: Minestrone
- 1934: Astronomer
- 1935: Ping Pong
- 1936: Samovar
- 1937: Paix des Dames
- 1938: Ker Flobert
- 1939: Palais Cardinal
- 1940: no race
- 1941: Morosini
- 1942: Legende
- 1943: Chateauroux
- 1944: Sabran
- 1945:
- 1946:
- 1947: Cappielluca
- 1948: Berthe
- 1949: Fleury
- 1950: Kilette
- 1951: Lacaduv
- 1952: Vamos
- 1953: Frere Georges
- 1954:
- 1955: Rosati
- 1956: Montaval
- 1957: Rumesnil
- 1958:
- 1959: Etwild
- 1960: Sheshoon
- 1961: Hautain
- 1962: Liberty Truck
- 1963:
- 1964: Frontin
- 1965: Tobrouk
- 1966: Sigebert
- 1967: Caldarello
- 1968: Frontal
- 1969: Grandier
- 1970: Shoemaker
- 1971: Jefferson
- 1972: Boreen
- 1973: Folkestone
- 1974: Ksar
- 1975: Record Run
- 1976: Larkhill
- 1977: Iron Duke
- 1978: Gairloch

== See also ==
- List of French flat horse races
