= Ralph B. Strassburger =

American businessman and racehorse owner (1883–1959)

Ralph Strassburger
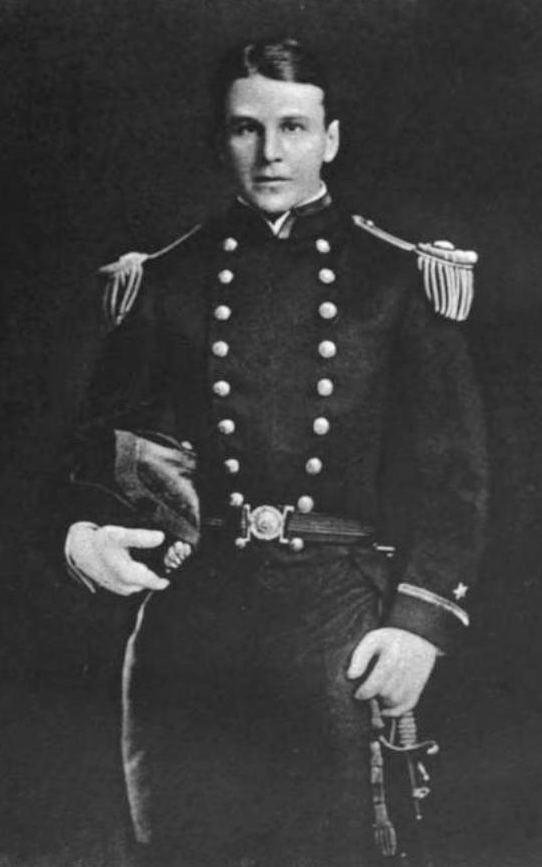
- Born: March 26, 1883; Norristown, Pennsylvania, U.S.
- Died: February 26, 1959 (aged 75); Paris, France
- Education: Phillips Exeter Academy, United States Naval Academy
- Occupation(s): Businessman: Newspaper publishing Racehorse owner/breeder
- Spouse: May Bourne (m. 1911)

Ralph Beaver Strassburger (March 26, 1883 – February 26, 1959) was an American businessman who was also a prominent Thoroughbred racehorse owner and breeder.

== Biography ==
Ralph B. Strassburger was born in Norristown, Pennsylvania on March 26, 1883. Educated at Phillips Exeter Academy in Exeter, New Hampshire, he graduated from the United States Naval Academy in 1905 and served in the U.S. Navy until 1909. He then went into business and in 1911 married May Bourne, the daughter of Frederick Gilbert Bourne, president of the Singer Sewing Machine Company. An unsuccessful candidate for the United States House of Representatives in the elections of 1914, following America's entry in World War I he rejoined the Navy and served as a transport officer until being discharged in 1919.

In 1921, Strassburger entered the newspaper business in his hometown, acquiring the Herald then the following year the other local, the Times. He merged the papers to create the Norristown Times Herald which still operates to this day. Of importance to historians and genealogists is Strassburger's book Pennsylvania German Pioneers: a publication of the original lists of arrival in the Port of Philadelphia from 1727 to 1808 published in 1934 in two volumes. He was president of the Pennsylvania German Society from 1928 to 1940.

He died at his home in Paris on February 26, 1959.

== Normandy Farm ==
In 1913, Ralph Strassburger and his wife purchased an early 18th-century farm and manor house in Whitpain Township, Montgomery County, Pennsylvania, where he raised horses and Ayrshire cattle. They spent a considerable amount of money on renovations and the construction of new utility buildings plus land acquisitions that over time expanded the property from 82 to 1,500 acres (6.1 km^{2}), expanding into Lower Gwynedd and Upper Gwynedd Townships. They called the place Normandy Farm, the name coming from an area of France that the Strassburgers loved and was renowned for its many important horse farms.

The Normandy Farm remained in the Strassburger family for several decades after Ralph Strassburger's death in 1959. Today, the property is listed on the United States government's National Register of Historic Places and is used as a hotel and conference center.

== European Thoroughbred horse racing ==
In an era when many wealthy Americans maintained secondary residences in Paris, France, and/or estates on the French Riviera, some like William Kissam Vanderbilt, Joseph E. Widener and Ralph Strassburger were involved in the very popular sport of Thoroughbred horse racing and acquired breeding farms in the renowned horse region of Lower Normandy.

In the 1920s, Ralph and May Strassburger purchased a villa from Baron Henri de Rothschild in Normandy's exclusive resort city of Deauville. Albert Stopford supplied them with antique. They also acquired the Haras des Monceaux Thoroughbred horse farm at Lisieux, about 18 miles (30 kilometers) south of Deauville. Their French racing stable enjoyed considerable success at the Deauville-La Touques Racecourse as well as at other racecourses in France and in England. Widely respected, France Galop refers to Ralph Strassburger as a "great friend of France."

To avoid seizure by the Nazis during the German occupation of France during World War II, all of the Strassburger horses raced under the name of a French friend, Mme. de Bonard. Among the Strassburgers' major successes were victories in both the French and British Classic Races as well as in the prestigious Washington, D.C. International Stakes in the United States.

== Notable race wins ==
=== France ===
- Grand Prix de Deauville - Asteroide 1926, Celerina (1931)
- Prix du Cadran - Asteroide (1927), Cambremer (1957)
- Prix Maurice de Gheest - Mordicus (1927), Guam (1952), Vamarie (1954)
- Critérium de Saint-Cloud - De Beers (1931), Lofoten 1956)
- Prix d'Astarté - Celerina (1931)
- Prix Hocquart - Bishop's Rock (1932), Angers (1960), Moutiers (1961)
- Critérium de Maisons-Laffitte - Pensbury (1942)
- Grand Prix de Paris - Pensbury (1943)
- Prix Greffulhe - Pensbury (1943)
- Prix Lupin - Pensbury (1943)
- Grand Critérium - Clarion (1946), Angers (1959)
- Prix Quincey - Clarion (1947)
- Prix du Rond Point - Clarion (1948)
- Prix Jean Prat - Le Tyrol (1951), Angers (1960)
- Prix du Conseil de Paris - Worden (1952), Mahan (1955)
- Prix de Barbeville - Mahan (1955), Clichy (1958)
- Prix Gontaut-Biron - Montaval (1956)
- Prix Dollar - Montaval (1957)

=== United Kingdom ===
- St. Leger Stakes Cambremer (1956)
- King George VI and Queen Elizabeth Stakes - Montaval (1957)

=== United States ===
- Washington, D.C. International - Worden (1953)

Following Strassburger's death in 1959, his widow continued to race horses. Eventually, their bloodstock was sold and their horse Worden went to Brickfields Stud in England where he became the Leading broodmare sire in Great Britain & Ireland in 1975 and 1976. The Villa Strassburger, listed in the French Monuments historiques register in 1975, remained in family hands until 1980 when his son donated it to the city of Deauville.
