= Cambremer (horse) =

French-bred Thoroughbred racehorse

- Sire: Chamossaire
- Grandsire: Precipitation
- Dam: Tomorrow
- Damsire: Easton
- Sex: Stallion
- Foaled: 18 April 1953
- Country: France
- Colour: Chestnut
- Breeder: Ralph Strassburger
- Owner: Ralph Strassburger
- Trainer: George Bridgland
- Record: 7: 4-2-1 (incomplete)

Major wins
- Grand Prix de Vichy (1956); St Leger Stakes (1956); Prix du Cadran (1957)

Awards
- Timeform rating: 132

Cambremer (foaled 18 April 1953) was a French Thoroughbred racehorse and sire best known for winning the classic St Leger Stakes in 1956. After showing some promise in his early career he developed into a top-class performer when moved up to longer distances. He won the Grand Prix de Vichy in the summer of 1956 before winning the St Leger. In the following season he won the Prix du Cadran and finished second in the Ascot Gold Cup. He made no impact as a sire of winners.

== Background ==
Cambremer was a dark chestnut horse with no white markings bred in France by his owner Ralph Strassburger. He was one of two classic winners sired by the 1945 St Leger winner Chamossaire, the other being the 1964 Epsom Derby winner Santa Claus. Cambremer's dam Tomorrow produced at least two other winners including Antler, who won the Grand Handicap de Deauville and was placed in several other major races including the Prix de la Porte Maillot and the Prix du Rond Point. The colt was trained throughout his career by George Bridgland.

== Racing career ==
Cambremer won one minor race as a two-year-old in 1955.

In the spring of 1956, Cambremer finished third behind Ambiax and Montaval in the Prix Daru over 2100 metres at Longchamp Racecourse and ran second to Incitatus in the Prix Jean Prat over 1600m. In July, the colt was moved up in distance to contest the Grand Prix de Vichy over 2600m and won from Cernobbio.

Cambremer was sent to England to contest the 181st running of the St Leger over fourteen and a half furlongs, at Doncaster Racecourse on 12 September. He was ridden by Fred Palmer and started at odds of 8/1 in a field of thirteen runners. The other contenders included the Irish Derby winner Talgo, the Queen's colt High Veldt, who had finished second to Ribot in the King George VI and Queen Elizabeth Stakes and the Prix Kergorlay winner Pont Levis, who was made favourite. Cambremer was not among the early leaders but was produced with a sustained run on the outside in the straight. He took the lead inside the final quarter mile and won by three-quarters of a length from Hornbeam, with French Beige one and a half lengths back in third.

In May 1957, Cambremer won France's premier long-distance race, the Prix du Cadran over 4000m at Longchamp. In the following month he was sent to Royal Ascot to contest the Ascot Gold Cup. He finished second, beaten one and a half lengths by Zarathustra, with the Italian-trained favourite Tissot in third.

== Assessment ==
In 1957, the independent Timeform organisation gave Cambremer a rating of 132, placing him a pound below the top-rated older horse Oroso. In their book, A Century of Champions, based on the Timeform rating system, John Randall and Tony Morris rated Cambremer an "average" winner of the St Leger.

== Stud record ==
Cambremer was retired from racing to become a breeding stallion, but had very little success as a sire of winners. His last reported foals were born in 1972.

== Pedigree ==
Pedigree of Cambremer (FR), chestnut stallion, 1953
Sire Chamossaire (GB) 1942	Precipitation (GB); 1933	Hurry On	Marcovil
Sire Chamossaire (GB) 1942	Precipitation (GB); 1933	Hurry On	Toute Suite
Sire Chamossaire (GB) 1942	Precipitation (GB); 1933	Double Life	Bachelors Double
Sire Chamossaire (GB) 1942	Precipitation (GB); 1933	Double Life	Saint Joan
Sire Chamossaire (GB) 1942	Snowberry (GB); 1937	Cameronian	Pharos
Sire Chamossaire (GB) 1942	Snowberry (GB); 1937	Cameronian	Una Cameron
Sire Chamossaire (GB) 1942	Snowberry (GB); 1937	Myrobella	Tetratema
Sire Chamossaire (GB) 1942	Snowberry (GB); 1937	Myrobella	Dolabella
Dam Tomorrow (FR) 1939	Easton (FR); 1931	Dark Legend	Dark Ronald
Dam Tomorrow (FR) 1939	Easton (FR); 1931	Dark Legend	Golden Legend
Dam Tomorrow (FR) 1939	Easton (FR); 1931	Phaona	Phalaris
Dam Tomorrow (FR) 1939	Easton (FR); 1931	Phaona	Destination
Dam Tomorrow (FR) 1939	Coquerelle (FR); 1924	Comrade	Bachelor's Double
Dam Tomorrow (FR) 1939	Coquerelle (FR); 1924	Comrade	Sourabaya
Dam Tomorrow (FR) 1939	Coquerelle (FR); 1924	Coquelourde	Rabelais
Dam Tomorrow (FR) 1939	Coquerelle (FR); 1924	Coquelourde	Coquille (Family: 23)
