= Hycilla =

British-bred Thoroughbred racehorse

- Sire: Hyperion
- Grandsire: Gainsborough
- Dam: Priscilla Carter
- Damsire: Omar Khayyam
- Sex: Mare
- Foaled: 1941
- Country: United Kingdom
- Colour: Chestnut
- Breeder: William Woodward Sr.
- Owner: William Woodward Sr.
- Trainer: Cecil Boyd-Rochfort
- Record: 6: 3-0-1

Major wins
- New Oaks Stakes (1944); Champion Stakes (1944)

Hycilla (1941 – 1953) was a British Thoroughbred racehorse and broodmare, who raced during World War II and was best known for winning the classic Oaks Stakes in 1944. Unraced as a juvenile, she finished second on her three-year-old debut before winning the Oaks, which was run that year at Newmarket Racecourse. She was beaten when favourite for St Leger but ended her year with a win in the Champion Stakes. In the following year, she failed to win but ran well in defeat when third in a strongly contested Coronation Cup. She retired to become a broodmare in the United States but made little impact, producing four minor stakes winners.

== Background ==
Hycilla was a chestnut filly bred and owned by the American banker William Woodward Sr. She was from the ninth crop of foals sired by Hyperion an outstanding racehorse who won The Derby and St Leger in 1933 becoming a highly-successful breeding stallion who was the Leading sire in Great Britain and Ireland on six occasions. Hycilla's dam, Priscilla Carter, who spent most of her breeding career at Woodward's Middleton Stud in Ireland, was an unraced daughter of Omar Khayyam the British-bred winner of the 1917 Kentucky Derby. Her other foals included the Doncaster Cup winner Alcazar, Isolater, who won two editions of the Saratoga Cup and Humility, the grand-dam of Aurelius. Priscilla Carter was bred in the United States and as her granddam Pyramid was sired by Hastings (a descendant of Lexington), Priscilla Carter was not eligible for entry into the General Stud Book under the rules of the Jersey Act. Consequently, Hycilla was designated as a "half-bred" Thoroughbred while racing and was also not entered into the stud book in the United Kingdom. Woodward sent Hycilla into training with Cecil Boyd-Rochfort at his Freemason Lodge Stable in Newmarket, Suffolk.

Hycilla's racing career took place during World War II during which horse racing in Britain was subject to many restrictions. Several major racecourses, including Epsom and Doncaster, were closed for the duration of the conflict, either for safety reasons, or because they were being used by the military. Many important races were rescheduled to new dates and venues, often at short notice, and all five of the Classics were usually run at Newmarket. Wartime austerity also meant that prize money was reduced: Hycilla's Oaks was worth £3,483 compared to the £8,043 earned by Galatea in 1939.

== Racing career ==
=== 1944: three-year-old season ===
Hycilla did not race as a two-year-old and was not considered a serious contender for the classics: in early in 1944 bookmakers were offering her at odds of 100/1 for the Oaks. She made her racecourse debut in a seven furlong race at Newmarket in May 1944 and finished second to Felucca. In the "New Oaks" run over one and a half miles on the July Course at Newmarket on 17 June she started at odds of 8/1 in a field of sixteen fillies. She was ridden by Georges Bridgland, a French jockey of English ancestry who was then serving in the Royal Air Force. Hycilla won by one and a half lengths from Monsoon with Kannabis a further lengths and a half lengths back in third.

Hycilla did not race again for three months before contesting the New St Leger, run at Newmarket in September in which she was matched against colts for the first time. She started the 4/1 favourite in a field which included the Derby winner Ocean Swell but finished unplaced behind Tehran. Bridgland reported that the filly had apparently failed to stay the distance after looking likely to win a quarter of a mile from the finish.

On her final appearance of the season, Hycilla took on colts and older horses in the Champion Stakes over ten furlongs in October. In this race she was re-equipped with a specially designed noseband which she had worn in the Oaks. Ridden by William Nevett, a Private in the Royal Army Ordnance Corps, she started at odds of 10/1 and won comfortably from thirteen opponents.

=== 1945: four-year-old season ===
Hycilla remained in training as a four-year-old with the Gold Cup as her main objective. In the substitute Coronation Cup at Newmarket she started 11/10 favourite and finished strongly to take third behind the colts Borealis and Ocean Swell in what was described as a "great race". The 1945 Gold Cup was run at Ascot Racecourse in July, returning to its traditional venue for the first time since 1939. Racing over two and a half miles, Hycilla finished unplaced behind Ocean Swell. In August she finished second to Borealis in the Great Yorkshire Stakes at York Racecourse.

== Assessment ==
In their book A Century of Champions, based on a modified version of the Timeform system, John Randall and Tony Morris rated Hycilla a "superior" winner of the Oaks.

== Breeding record ==
At the end of the 1945 season, Hycilla was retired from racing and sent to the United States to become a broodmare for her owner's Belair Stud. She died in 1953. Her recorded foals include:

- Heraclesia, a chestnut filly, (1947) sired by Fighting Fox. Unplaced in four starts.
- Galycidon, bay colt, (1948) sired by Sir Galahad. Won one race in 15 starts.
- Sunny Fox, bay colt, (1949) sired by Gallant Fox. Won four races in 35 starts.
- Prism, bay gelding, (1950) sired by Apache. Won seven races in 57 starts and died in 1955.
- Tarcill, brown gelding, born in 1953, sired by Black Tarquin. Won two races in 56 starts.

== Pedigree ==
Pedigree of Hycilla (GB), chestnut mare, 1941
Sire Hyperion (GB) 1930	Gainsborough (GB); 1915	Bayardo	Bay Ronald
Sire Hyperion (GB) 1930	Gainsborough (GB); 1915	Bayardo	Galicia
Sire Hyperion (GB) 1930	Gainsborough (GB); 1915	Rosedrop	St. Frusquin
Sire Hyperion (GB) 1930	Gainsborough (GB); 1915	Rosedrop	Rosaline
Sire Hyperion (GB) 1930	Selene (GB); 1919	Chaucer	St. Simon
Sire Hyperion (GB) 1930	Selene (GB); 1919	Chaucer	Canterbury Pilgrim
Sire Hyperion (GB) 1930	Selene (GB); 1919	Serenissima	Minoru
Sire Hyperion (GB) 1930	Selene (GB); 1919	Serenissima	Gondolette
Dam Priscilla Carter (USA) 1925	Omar Khayyam (GB); 1914	Marco	Barcaldine
Dam Priscilla Carter (USA) 1925	Omar Khayyam (GB); 1914	Marco	Novitiate
Dam Priscilla Carter (USA) 1925	Omar Khayyam (GB); 1914	Lisma	Persimmon
Dam Priscilla Carter (USA) 1925	Omar Khayyam (GB); 1914	Lisma	Luscious
Dam Priscilla Carter (USA) 1925	The Reef (USA); 1914	Trap Rock	Rock Sand
Dam Priscilla Carter (USA) 1925	The Reef (USA); 1914	Trap Rock	Topiary
Dam Priscilla Carter (USA) 1925	The Reef (USA); 1914	Pyramid	Hastings
Dam Priscilla Carter (USA) 1925	The Reef (USA); 1914	Pyramid	St Priscilla (Family: 2-n)
