= Easton (horse) =

French-bred Thoroughbred racehorse

- Sire: Dark Legend
- Grandsire: Dark Ronald
- Dam: Phaona
- Damsire: Phalaris
- Sex: Stallion
- Foaled: 1931
- Country: France
- Colour: Bay or Brown
- Breeder: Ralph B. Strassburger
- Owner: Ralph B. Strassburger; Lord Woolavington
- Trainer: Fred Darling
- Record: 15: 7-3-2

Major wins
- Prix Ladas (1934); Grand International d'Ostend (1934); Select Stakes (1934); Lingfield Spring Stakes (1935); Newmarket March Stakes (1935); Ribblesdale Stakes (1935)

Easton (1931 – after 1950) was a French-bred Thoroughbred racehorse and sire. After winning two minor races in France, he made an immediate impact on his British debut when finishing second to Colombo in the 2000 Guineas. He was then bought by Lord Woolavington and transferred permanently to England. He finished second to Windsor Lad in a very strong renewal of The Derby and third in the Grand Prix de Paris before winning the Grand International d'Ostend in Belgium and the Select Stakes at Newmarket. In the following year, he won highly competitive races at Lingfield and Newmarket before being beaten in a rematch with Windsor Lad for the Coronation Cup. He retired from racing after winning the Ribblesdale Stakes at Royal Ascot. He made little impact as a breeding stallion in Europe but sired some good winners in the United States.

== Background ==
Easton was a "handsome" bay or brown horse with no white markings bred in France by Ralph B. Strassburger. He was sired by Dark Legend, who finished third to Gay Crusader in the 1917 Epsom Derby before winning many major races in India. At stud he was a strong influence for stamina and his best runners included Galatea, Duplex (Prix du Jockey Club) and Dark Japan (Goodwood Cup). He later became known as the damsire of Dante and Sayajirao. Easton's dam Phaona was a great-granddaughter of the broodmare Astrology, whose other descendants have included Canford Cliffs and Makybe Diva.

== Racing career ==
=== 1933: two-year-old season ===
As a two-year-old, Easton campaigned in France, where he won one of his five races and finished third once. He was not regarded as one of the leading juveniles of his generation, being rated more than twelve pounds inferior to Brantome.

=== 1934: three-year-old season ===
Easton began his three-year-old season with an easy win in the Prix Ladas. On 2 May, Easton was sent to England to contest the 2000 Guineas over the Rowley mile course at Newmarket Racecourse. He finished second of the twelve runners, beaten a length by the 2/7 favourite Colombo. Shortly after he ran in the 2000 Guineas, Easton was bought for 10,000 guineas by Lord Woolavington and transferred to the stable of Fred Darling at Beckhampton, Wiltshire

On his first appearance for his new owner, the colt contested the Derby Stakes over one and a half miles at Epsom Downs Racecourse. The race was run of fast ground in front of a crowd estimated at at least 300,000, and Easton started the 100/9 third favorite behind Colombo and the Chester Vase winner Windsor Lad. Ridden by Gordon Richards, Easton tracked the leaders before launching his challenge in the straight. He moved into second place behind Windsor Lad but could make no further progress and finished second, a length behind the winner, with Colombo a neck away in third.

Easton returned to Continental Europe for his next two races. On 24 June, he contested the ₣765,400 Grand Prix de Paris over 3000 metres at Longchamp Racecourse in which he was again ridden by Richards. He led the field into the straight but was overtaken in the closing stages and finished third, beaten three lengths by the winner Admiral Drake, a colt who had finished last in the Derby. In July, Easton met Admiral Drake again in the Grand International d'Ostende at Hippodrome Wellington in Belgium. He won the race easily from Admiral Drake, with the Prix de Guiche winner Rentenmark in third. On his return to England, Easton won the Select Stakes (worth £365) over one mile at Newmarket.

=== 1935: four-year-old season ===
On his first appearance as a four-year-old, Easton contested the £531 Spring Stakes over one mile at Lingfield Park Racecourse in April. He looked very impressive before the race and won by a neck from the three-year-old Sea Bequest, to whom he was conceding twenty-four pounds, appearing to win rather more easily than the final margin suggested. The runner-up went on to finish third to Bahram in the 2000 Guineas. Easton then earned a further £750 by taking the March Stakes over ten furlongs at Newmarket, beating the Champion Stakes winner Umidwar by four lengths.

He then faced Windsor Lad again in the Coronation Cup at Epsom. The race was much anticipated and was seen as a match between Easton's speed and Windsor Lad's stamina. Both colts looked to be in exceptional condition before the race, although it was noted that Easton was "on his toes" and "full of fire and eagerness". Charlie Smirke sent Windsor Lad three lengths clear early in the straight, and although Gordon Richards sent Easton in pursuit and reduced the margin, he was unable to catch the Derby winner and was beaten one and a half lengths.

On his final racecourse appearance, Easton ran at Royal Ascot in the Ribblesdale Stakes, which was then a race run over one mile for three- and four-year-olds of either sex. Ridden by Richards, he won at odds of 1/4 from the filly Almond Hill, taking a prize of £1,720. His retirement was announced a few days later, shortly before the death of Lord Woolavington.

== Stud record ==
On his retirement from racing, Easton was retired to his late owner's Lavington Stud in England before being exported to the United States in 1941. The best of his offspring included the Dwyer Stakes winner Wildlife and the filly Red Shoes, who won the Pimlico Oaks and the Test Stakes in 1946.

== Assessment ==
In their book A Century of Champions, based on a modified version of the Timeform system, John Randall and Tony Morris rated Easton the one hundred and seventy-ninth best racehorse of twentieth century, the seventy-seventh best horse of the century to have been trained in Great Britain and Ireland, and the fifth best horse foaled in 1931 after Windsor Lad, Brantome, Discovery and Colombo.

== Pedigree ==
Pedigree of Easton (FR), bay or brown stallion, 1931
Sire Dark Legend (GB) 1914	Dark Ronald (IRE); 1905	Bay Ronald	Hampton*
Sire Dark Legend (GB) 1914	Dark Ronald (IRE); 1905	Bay Ronald	Black Duchess
Sire Dark Legend (GB) 1914	Dark Ronald (IRE); 1905	Darkie	Thurio
Sire Dark Legend (GB) 1914	Dark Ronald (IRE); 1905	Darkie	Insignia
Sire Dark Legend (GB) 1914	Golden Legend (GB); 1907	Amphion	Rosebery
Sire Dark Legend (GB) 1914	Golden Legend (GB); 1907	Amphion	Suicide
Sire Dark Legend (GB) 1914	Golden Legend (GB); 1907	St Lucre	St Serf*
Sire Dark Legend (GB) 1914	Golden Legend (GB); 1907	St Lucre	Fairy Gold
Dam Phaona (GB) 1923	Phalaris (GB); 1913	Polymelus	Cyllene
Dam Phaona (GB) 1923	Phalaris (GB); 1913	Polymelus	Maid Marian*
Dam Phaona (GB) 1923	Phalaris (GB); 1913	Bromus	Sainfoin
Dam Phaona (GB) 1923	Phalaris (GB); 1913	Bromus	Cheery*
Dam Phaona (GB) 1923	Destination (GB); 1907	Desmond	St Simon*
Dam Phaona (GB) 1923	Destination (GB); 1907	Desmond	L'Abbesse de Jouarre
Dam Phaona (GB) 1923	Destination (GB); 1907	L'Etoile	Isinglass
Dam Phaona (GB) 1923	Destination (GB); 1907	L'Etoile	Astrology (Family:9-f)

* Easton is inbred 5S x 5D x 4D to the stallion St Simon, meaning that he appears fifth generation (via St Serf) on the sire side of his pedigree, and fifth generation (via Cheery) and fourth generation on the dam side of his pedigree.

* Easton is inbred 4S x 5D to the stallion Hampton, meaning that he appears fourth generation on the sire side of his pedigree, and fifth generation (via Maid Marion) on the dam side of his pedigree.
