= Montaval =

French-bred Thoroughbred racehorse

- Sire: Norseman
- Grandsire: Umidwar
- Dam: Ballynash
- Damsire: Nasrullah
- Sex: Stallion
- Foaled: April 1953
- Country: France
- Colour: Bay
- Breeder: Ralph B. Strassburger
- Owner: Ralph B. Strassburger
- Trainer: George Bridgland
- Record: 17: 5–3–1

Major wins
- Prix Gontaut-Biron (1956); Prix Dollar (1957); King George VI and Queen Elizabeth Stakes (1957)

Montaval (foaled 1953) was a French Thoroughbred racehorse and sire. Although trained in France throughout his career, his most notable achievements came in Britain: he was narrowly beaten in the 1956 Epsom Derby and won the King George VI and Queen Elizabeth Stakes in the following year. In total he won five times in a career of at least seventeen races which lasted from 1955 until November 1957. He was retired to stand as a stallion in Ireland and was exported to Japan in 1961.

== Background ==
Montaval was a bay horse with a narrow white blaze and three white socks bred in France by this owner, the American businessman Ralph B. Strassburger. Montaval's dam, the British-bred mare Ballynash was bought by Strassburger for £2000 in December 1949. Apart from Montaval, Ballynash produced the successful racehorse and sire Mourne and the filly Petite Sanguenay, the grand-dam of Pawneese. The colt was trained in France by George Bridgland and ridden in most of his races by Freddie Palmer.

== Racing career ==
Montaval's early career was not particularly notable, as he won one minor race in five starts as a two-year-old in 1955.

In the following spring he was beaten in his first three races, but showed some potential when finishing second to Ambiax in the Prix Daru. He was then sent to Britain to contest The Derby in which he started a 40/1 outsider in a field of twenty-seven runners. Despite driving rain, the race attracted an estimated crowd of 250,000, including the Queen Mother. Ridden by Freddie Palmer, Montaval was well back in the field for most of the way before making progress in the straight. Still fifth with a hundred yards to run he finished strongly but failed by a neck to catch Lavandin. The fact that the first two horses were trained in France, following on from the victory of Phil Drake in the previous year, led some commentators to state that British racing had "hit rock bottom".

Montaval ran poorly in the Grand Prix de Paris a month later but showed better form in his two remaining races that year, both of which came at Deauville Racecourse in August. He won his first important race when winning the Prix Gontaut-Biron over 2000 metres and then finished second to Tall Chief in the Grand Prix de Deauville.

As a four-year-old in 1957, Montaval won his first two races including the Prix Dollar at Longchamp Racecourse. He then finished third to the three-year-old Arctic Explorer when strongly fancied to win the Eclipse Stakes at Sandown Park on 13 July and returned to England a week later for Britain's most prestigious all-aged race, the King George VI and Queen Elizabeth Stakes at Ascot. Montaval started a 20/1 outsider in a field of twelve runners, only three of which were trained in Britain following the withdrawal of the Epsom Derby winner Crepello. The "thrilling" finish was dominated by French challengers, with Montaval finishing strongly to win by a short head from Al Mabsoot, with Tribord third and Saint Raphael fourth. His starting price remains, as of 2012, the longest for any King George winner.

Montaval did not appear again until November, when he was sent to the United States to contest the Washington, D.C. International Stakes. He finished unplaced behind Mahan and was subsequently retired to stud.

== Assessment ==
In their book, A Century of Champions, based on the Timeform rating system, John Randall and Tony Morris rated Montaval a "poor" winner of the King George.

== Stud record ==
At the end of his racing career, Montaval was bought by Lord Harrington and sent to stand as a breeding stallion in Ireland. In 1961 he was sold again and exported to Japan. His progeny included Nihon Pillow Ace who won the Satsuki Shō in 1966.

== Pedigree ==
Pedigree of Montaval (FR), bay stallion, 1953
| Sire Norseman (FR) 1940 | Umidwar; 1931 | Blandford* | Swynford* |
| Sire Norseman (FR) 1940 | Umidwar; 1931 | Blandford* | Blanche* |
| Sire Norseman (FR) 1940 | Umidwar; 1931 | Uganda | Bridaine |
| Sire Norseman (FR) 1940 | Umidwar; 1931 | Uganda | Hush |
| Sire Norseman (FR) 1940 | Tara; 1932 | Teddy | Ajax |
| Sire Norseman (FR) 1940 | Tara; 1932 | Teddy | Rondeau |
| Sire Norseman (FR) 1940 | Tara; 1932 | Jean Gow | Neil Gow |
| Sire Norseman (FR) 1940 | Tara; 1932 | Jean Gow | Jane Shore |
| Dam Ballynash (GB) 1946 | Nasrullah; 1940 | Nearco | Pharos |
| Dam Ballynash (GB) 1946 | Nasrullah; 1940 | Nearco | Nogara |
| Dam Ballynash (GB) 1946 | Nasrullah; 1940 | Mumtaz Begum | Blenheim* |
| Dam Ballynash (GB) 1946 | Nasrullah; 1940 | Mumtaz Begum | Mumtaz Mahal |
| Dam Ballynash (GB) 1946 | Ballywellbroke; 1933 | Ballyferis | Apron |
| Dam Ballynash (GB) 1946 | Ballywellbroke; 1933 | Ballyferis | Gilford |
| Dam Ballynash (GB) 1946 | Ballywellbroke; 1933 | The Beggar | Le Souvenir |
| Dam Ballynash (GB) 1946 | Ballywellbroke; 1933 | The Beggar | Avonbeg (Family:9) |

* Montaval is inbred 3S x 5D to the stallion Blandford, meaning that he appears third generation on the sire side of his pedigree, and fifth generation (via Blenheim) on the dam side of his pedigree.
