= Wild Illusion =

British-bred Thoroughbred racehorse

- Racing silks of Godolphin
- Sire: Dubawi
- Grandsire: Dubai Millennium
- Dam: Rumh
- Damsire: Monsun
- Sex: Mare
- Foaled: 18 February 2015
- Country: United Kingdom
- Colour: Bay
- Breeder: Godolphin
- Owner: Godolphin
- Trainer: Charlie Appleby
- Record: 12: 4-3-1
- Earnings: £1,195,992

Major wins
- Prix Marcel Boussac (2017); Nassau Stakes (2018); Prix de l'Opéra (2018)

Awards
- Top-rated British 2-y-o filly (2017)

Wild Illusion (foaled 18 February 2015) is a British Thoroughbred racehorse. She was the highest-rated horse of her age and sex trained in Britain in 2017 when she won two of her three races including the Group 1 Prix Marcel Boussac. In the following year she finished fourth in the 1000 Guineas and second in the Epsom Oaks before winning the Nassau Stakes and the Prix de l'Opéra.

== Background ==
Wild Illusion is a bay mare with a white sock on her left foreleg who was bred and owned by Sheikh Mohammed's Godolphin organisation. She is trained by Charlie Appleby, whose stable is based at Newmarket, Suffolk, but typically relocates to Dubai in winter.

She was sired by Dubawi a top-class son of Dubai Millennium, whose wins included the Irish 2,000 Guineas and the Prix Jacques Le Marois. At stud, Dubawi has been a highly-successful breeding stallion, siring major winners such as Monterosso, Al Kazeem, Makfi, Lucky Nine and Night of Thunder. Wild Illusion's dam Rumh was a German mare who won four races in England including the Listed Ballymacoll Stud Stakes. She was a descendant of the Irish mare Le Melody (foaled 1971), the dam of Ardross and the female-line ancestor of Electrocutionist and Scorpion.

== Racing career ==
=== 2017: two-year-old season ===
Wild Illusion was ridden in all of her 2017 races by James Doyle. She began her racing career in a minor race over one mile at Yarmouth Racecourse on 22 August in which she started the 15/8 favourite and won "comfortably" by two and a half lengths from Give And Take. The filly was immediately stepped up in class and sent to France for the Prix d'Aumale over 1600 metres at Chantilly Racecourse on 3 September and finished third behind Soustraction and Efaadah. On 1 October, over the same course and distance, she started a 25/1 outsider in a seven-runner field for the Group 1 Prix Marcel Boussac. Polydream (winner of the Prix du Calvados), started favourite ahead of Magical (Debutante Stakes) and Soustraction. After racing in second place behind Soustraction, Wild Illusion took the lead 400 metres from the finish and kept on well to win by a length from Polydream. After the race Appleby said "She came forward a lot for her last run and we were delighted with her at home... She's as genuine as the day is long and is a lovely filly".

In the official European Classification for 2017, Wild Illusion was rated the second-best two-year-old filly of the season, one pound behind the Irish-trained Clemmie.

=== 2018: three-year-old season ===
On her three-year-old debut, Wild Illusion started the 11/2 third choice in the betting for the 1000 Guineas over the Rowley Mile at Newmarket Racecourse on 6 May and after briefly reaching second place she came home fourth behind Billesdon Brook, Laurens and Happily. William Buick took the ride when the filly was stepped up in distance and started 5/2 favourite for the Oaks Stakes over one and a half miles at Epsom Racecourse on 1 June. She took the lead two furlongs out but was soon overtaken by the Aidan O'Brien-trained Forever Together and was beaten four and a half lengths into second place. She was then dropped back to Group 2 level for the Ribblesdale Stakes at Royal Ascot but despite starting favourite she was beaten by Magic Wand, to whom she was conceding three pounds in weight.

At Goodwood Racecourse on 2 August Wild Illusion was matched against older fillies and mares in the Nassau Stakes over ten furlongs. She started at odds of 4/1 against five opponents, namely Rhododendron, Billesdon Brook, Urban Fox (Pretty Polly Stakes), Veracious and Wilamina. In a change of tactics, Buick sent the filly into the lead from the start, and after holding off several challengers she drew away in the closing stages to win by two lengths from Urban Fox. Appleby commented "I felt the drop back was going to help and tactically we couldn’t see where the pace was going to come from. So I asked William to go out there and do what he is good at. He is great on the front end and he gave her a lovely tactical ride."

On 7 October, just over a year after her win in the Prix Marcel Boussac Wild Illusion was sent back to France for the Prix de l'Opéra over 2000 metres at Longchamp Racecourse. She started the 2/1 favourite ahead of fourteen opponents including Magic Wand, With You (Prix Rothschild), Lady Frankel (Prix de Lieurey), Rhododendron, Urban Fox, Homerique (Prix de Psyché), Catellar (Prix de la Nonette) and My Sister Nat (Prix Bertrand de Tarragon). The favourite started well and was settled in fifth place by Buick as the other Godolphin runner Winter Lightning set the pace. Wild Illusion moved up on the outside entering the straight, took the lead 300 metres out and stayed on well to win by a length from Magic Wand and the fast-finishing Homerique. After the race Appleby said "All credit to the filly, she's danced every dance and is so tough. She was the only filly on the bridle turning in and I couldn't see her getting beat because there's one thing she won't do, she won't lie down and she'll gallop all the way to the line".

For her final run of the year Wild Illusion was sent to the United States to contest the Breeders' Cup Filly & Mare Turf at Churchill Downs on 3 November and was made the 9/4 favourite in a fourteen-runner field. After being reluctant to enter the starting gate she recovered from a poor start to take the lead in the straight but was overtaken in the final strides and was beaten a neck by the Irish-bred four-year-old Sistercharlie. Appleby commented "I'm delighted with her run. She's run a fantastic race and has lost nothing in defeat".

=== 2019: four-year-old season ===
For her first run of 2019 Wild Illusion was sent to Longchamp for the Prix d'Ispahan over 1800 metres on 26 May and started favourite against eight opponents. Ridden by Doyle she briefly took the lead 200 metres from the finish but faded in the final strides and came home sixth behind the Roger Varian-trained Zabeel Prince. Doyle was again in the saddle when the filly was sent to Ireland to contest the Pretty Polly Stakes at the Curragh on 28 June. She led for most of the way but was overtaken in the last quarter mile and finished fourth of the five runners in a race won by the three-year-old Iridessa. At Deauville Racecourse in August the filly started second favourite for the Prix Jean Romanet but after leading the race until the last 300 metres she dropped back and finished sixth of the eight runners behind Coronet.

== Pedigree ==
Pedigree of Wild Illusion (GB), bay mare, 2015
Sire Dubawi (IRE) 2002	Dubai Millennium (GB); 1996	Seeking the Gold (USA)	Mr. Prospector
Sire Dubawi (IRE) 2002	Dubai Millennium (GB); 1996	Seeking the Gold (USA)	Con Game
Sire Dubawi (IRE) 2002	Dubai Millennium (GB); 1996	Colorado Dancer (IRE)	Shareef Dancer (USA)
Sire Dubawi (IRE) 2002	Dubai Millennium (GB); 1996	Colorado Dancer (IRE)	Fall Aspen (USA)
Sire Dubawi (IRE) 2002	Zomaradah (GB); 1995	Deploy	Shirley Heights
Sire Dubawi (IRE) 2002	Zomaradah (GB); 1995	Deploy	Slightly Dangerous (USA)
Sire Dubawi (IRE) 2002	Zomaradah (GB); 1995	Jawaher (IRE)	Dancing Brave (USA)
Sire Dubawi (IRE) 2002	Zomaradah (GB); 1995	Jawaher (IRE)	High Tern
Dam Rumh (GER) 2008	Monsun (GER); 1990	Königsstuhl	Dschingis Khan
Dam Rumh (GER) 2008	Monsun (GER); 1990	Königsstuhl	Koningskronung
Dam Rumh (GER) 2008	Monsun (GER); 1990	Mosella	Surumu
Dam Rumh (GER) 2008	Monsun (GER); 1990	Mosella	Monasia
Dam Rumh (GER) 2008	Royal Dubai (GER); 2000	Dashing Blade (GB)	Elegant Air
Dam Rumh (GER) 2008	Royal Dubai (GER); 2000	Dashing Blade (GB)	Sharp Castan
Dam Rumh (GER) 2008	Royal Dubai (GER); 2000	Reem Dubai (IRE)	Nashwan (USA)
Dam Rumh (GER) 2008	Royal Dubai (GER); 2000	Reem Dubai (IRE)	Gesedeh (Family 23)
