= Daryz =

Racehorse (foaled 2022)

- Breed: Thoroughbred
- Sire: Sea the Stars
- Grandsire: Cape Cross
- Dam: Daryakana
- Damsire: Selkirk
- Sex: Stallion
- Foaled: 2 May 2022 (age 4)
- Country: France
- Colour: Bay
- Owner: Aga Khan Studs SCEA
- Racing colours
- Trainer: Francis-Henri Graffard
- Record: 12: 9-1-1
- Earnings: $ 7,051,266

Major wins
- Prix Eugène Adam (2025); Prix de l'Arc de Triomphe (2025, 2026); Prix Ganay (2026); Prix Aga Khan IV (2026); Prix Foy (2026)
- Last updated on 04 October, 2026

Daryz (foaled 2 May 2022) is a retired French Thoroughbred racehorse, most notable for winning the 2025 and 2026 Prix de l'Arc de Triomphe. After a series of four victories, including a win at the Group 2 Prix Eugène Adam, Daryz performed poorly at the 2025 International Stakes, placing last in a field of 6 runners. Daryz's final two runs of his three-year-old season were the Prix du Prince d'Orange and the Prix de l'Arc de Triomphe, where Daryz won by a head in front of Minnie Hauk. After an extended break going into 2026, Daryz picked up an impressive win at the Prix Ganay as his first win of his four-year-old season.

== Background ==
Daryz was bred by Aga Khan Studs in France, and was foaled on 2 May 2022. Daryz was sired by Sea the Stars, a champion racehorse who won several Group 1 races including the 2009 Prix de l'Arc de Triomphe. His dam Daryakana was also a successful racehorse, winning the Group 1 Prix de Royallieu and Hong Kong Vase. Both Sea the Stars and Daryakana are owned by Aga Khan Studs.

Daryz is trained by Francis-Henri Graffard, who is the principal trainer for Aga Khan Studs, a Thoroughbred horse racing and breeding enterprise that has been owned by the Aga Khan family for four generations. Francis-Henri Graffard also trains Daryz's stablemate Calandagan, another champion racehorse who has found much success internationally.

== Racing career ==
=== 2025 : three-year-old season ===
Daryz did not race as a two-year-old, and he made his three-year-old debut at the Prix Juigné at Longchamp Racecourse on 6 April as the favourite in a field of 8. From the beginning, Daryz was sent to the front of the pack for most of the race, settling in at around third position. With under 300 meters left in the race, Daryz started to accelerate and he overtook the leader with just under 200 meters to go. Daryz successfully held onto the lead as he crossed the finish line, 3/4 of a length ahead of second. For his next race, Daryz was entered into the Prix De Croissy, held at Longchamp over a distance of 2000m. Once again, Daryz was positioned at the front, this time in second plance in the field of five runners. After exiting the final corner, Daryz began his move to take the lead in the last two furlongs to win by 3/4 of a length.Daryz's third start of the year was at the Prix Ridgway, a 2000m race at Longchamp. Much like his previous races, Daryz was settled in at the front of the field, and stayed dormant for most of the race before unleashing his turn of foot to secure a comfortable victory by 4 1/2 lengths ahead of second.

Daryz's first group race entry was the Prix Eugène Adam, held at Saint-Cloud Racecourse over 2000m. This time, different tactics were employed, as Daryz was positioned in the middle of the pack. He also began his surge considerably later than his previous races, only taking the lead in the final furlong, but he still won by a margin of 3/4of a length. In a post-race interview, trainer Francis-Henri Graffard stated, "I didn't really have a good reason for extending him right now. He's not a very expressive colt in the morning, but he's ready."

After a break of two months without racing, Daryz was entered into his first Group 1 race, the International Stakes held at York Racecourse over a distance of 2050m. Although the race has only six entries, it showcased a field of well-established runners such as Danon Decile, winner of the 2024 Japanese Derby and 2025 Dubai Sheema Classic; Delacroix, winner of the 2025 Irish Champion Stakes and Coral Eclipse; as well as Ombudsman, who won the 2025 Prince of Wales's Stakes, and was ranked joint number one horse in the world as of August 10, 2025. During the race, Daryz was positioned tightly within the main pack, completely ignoring the leader, Birr Castle, who had a lead of about 25 lengths in the final straight. As the rest of the runners chased down the leader, Daryz was moved to position on the inside rail among the chasing group. However, Daryz weakened considerably inside the last furlong and placed a disappointing sixth out of six, 12 1/4 lengths behind the winner, Ombudsman.

After his poor result at the International Stakes, Daryz's next race came at the Prix du Prince d'Orange, a race that serves as an alternative trial for the Prix de l'Arc de Triomphe. Among the racers was Croix du Nord, a Japanese racehorse, who claimed two Grade I victories in the Hopeful Stakes and Japanese Derby before entering the Prix du Prince d'Orange. Daryz was ridden in his usual way of settling near the rear of the pack until the final straight. However, as Daryz attempted to move up, he was blocked in front by Uthred and on his left by Croix du Nord. Eventually, an opening formed when Croix du Nord moved further to the outside, and Daryz attempted to overtake on the left. Despite a late surge by Daryz, it was not enough to take the lead from Croix du Nord, who won by a short head.

For his final race of this three-year-old season, Daryz entered the Prix de l'Arc de Triomphe, the richest horse race held in Europe, and one of the most prestigious turf races in the world. The field of 17 runners as well as the distance of 2400m were the largest that Daryz had faced up to this point. The draw proved to be fortunate for Daryz, as he obtained the second stall along the inside, a historically favourable position for winners of the Prix de l'Arc de Triomphe. The race started with Daryz behind a couple of horses on the inside rail with the rest of the field spread far horizontally along the track. As the race progressed, Daryz was positioned on the inside in the front half of the pack. As the racers rushed towards the finish, Daryz made a move to the front with 400m left in the race. The finish saw Daryz and Minnie Hauk fight for the lead as they separated from the rest of the pack by five lengths. In a tight finish, Daryz snatched the lead from Minnie Hauk within the final 50m of the race to win by a head.

For the team behind Daryz, his victory at the Prix de l'Arc de Triomphe was a monumental milestone, as this marked jockey Mickael Barzalona and trainer Francis-Henri Graffard's first win at the race. In an interview after the race, Graffard stated:

"In the past this was just a dream, and now it's happening to me... This race has an amazing reputation, and it shows as when you win it, it's very, very special. I've had some big wins, but this one is very special, especially this year... When you have a plan in your head and you can see that the plan is working, you leave the race very well—it's a great experience. It was exactly what we planned to do... It's a big win. I'm very lucky that Princess Zahra and her family give me the confidence to train this amazing horse, and to win the Arc with these colors is just crazy."

Additionally, Daryz's victory marked a record eight wins in the Arc for the Aga Khan family, including four wins from the late Aga Khan IV who had passed away in February 2025. In particular, Princess Zahra Aga Khan, the daughter of Aga Khan IV, was overcome with emotion after the race, and commented on the personal importance of the race: "As a breeder, and as part of a legacy that stretches back more than a century, winning this race is the pinnacle of what one can achieve... I hope my father saw it. He was always so happy when he won the Arc. Now, I know that feeling too."

With his victory in the l'Arc, Daryz finished the 2025 season with joint seventh place in IFHA rating with 127 sharing it with Hong Kong superstar Romantic Warrior and 2024 Breeders' Cup Classic winner Sierra Leone.

=== 2026 : four-year-old season ===
With his eventful 2025 season behind him, Daryz returned to training in 2026 to prepare for his first start of his four-year-old season: the Prix Ganay. The race saw a return to the smaller fields that Daryz was familiar with, this time featuring only five runners. Coming into the race, Daryz was the heavy favourite with pre-race odds of 5/6. Daryz showed no regression from his previous form, as he had a comfortable ride for the majority of the race before unleashing his turn of foot at the 250m mark to win by an impressive 3 1/2 lengths over the second place, Bright Picture. After the race, Daryz's team showered him with praise, with stable manager Nemone Routh stating:

"Daryz is incredible! He did it very easily and was very responsive. He stayed extremely focused, even though the pace wasn't strong, and he was highly maneuverable. Mickaël Barzalona, his jockey, told us he didn't even have to ask him—he accelerated on his own. It's really a pleasure to see him win like that. Physically, he looks even better. He has progressed race after race, gaining maturity. He loves to win—he's a very dominant horse with a strong competitive mindset. For us, the decision to keep him in training wasn't that difficult: in the Arc, he had already shown us what we believed about him. We knew he had the class to perform. He has proven he can do everything: 2,400 meters on soft ground as well as 2,000 meters on fast ground. It's important for us to show breeders that he is versatile."

Trainer Francis-Henri Graffard also stated, “The horse is definitely stronger and is more mature... It was the perfect race to make his comeback in. They didn't go fast but he was perfectly in tune with what Mickael [Barzalona, jockey] was asking him to do. He got there without being woken up and when Mickael asked him to accelerate he reacted immediately." Graffard continued: “His objective will be the Prince of Wales's Stakes at Ascot in June, and the race that falls in between is the Prix Aga Khan IV [(formerly the Prix d’Ispahan], so we'll discuss that as an option.” At the Prix Aga Khan IV, he breezed through the competition and beat Leffard by 3 1/2 lengths and the previous winner, Sosie by 7 1/2 lengths. After the race, Princess Zahra quoted:

“He's an impressive horse, He was as cool as a cucumber and it was so steady in terms of performance and he's so versatile in terms of distance. Mickael said he jumped three shadows, but was always in his own tempo and relaxed and I guess he's learning his job. This is what we thought we would see last year, but as a May foal we are now seeing the complete horse.”

In his next race, the Prince of Wales's Stakes, Daryz was in touch with the leaders throughout the race and made headway two furlongs from the finish. Just outside the final furlong, Daryz took second position but was unable to muster up any challenge to the leader, placing third behind Ombudsman and Minnie Hauk. After this loss, Daryz did not race for the next two months, instead participating in the Prix Foy, a trial race for the Prix de l'Arc de Triomphe. Daryz was given a calm ride for most of the race, settling in second position a length and a half behind the leader. In the final furlong, Daryz gently accelerated to take the lead, finishing in first 1 3/4 lengths ahead of second, Bay City Roller. On October 4, Daryz raced in the Prix de l'Arc de Triomphe for the second time in his career, aiming to be the first colt to win the race consecutively since Alleged nearly fifty years ago in 1977 and 1978. Facing a field of 16, Daryz was ridden patiently in the rear before launching from the right to close in on and overtake Bay City Roller within the final two furlongs, winning by a comfortable length and a quarter. Daryz's second victory in the Arc was the ninth for the Aga Khan family since their first in 1948. Speaking of the race, Graffard stated:

"He's a good horse, he's a champion... There was a lot of pressure on to make it possible, but when I saw him in his ease on the outside, I knew he was going to accelerate really strongly and he did. It was beautiful to witness such a great run down the straight, and he is such a great champion. It was absolutely not the plan to find ourselves so far back. I am very lucky that Daryz had a better trip than Varandir [seventh], because he was completely boxed in. Mickael rode a beautiful race again and it's so beautiful for the sport, that's why I love it."

When asked about Daryz's future, Princess Zahra stated, "You get to the point where you're taking a risk every time you run the horse... His mother improved with age, but would we want him to train on for another year? I'm not sure. I think he has other things to do." Additionally, Graffard said: "I don’t think he has to prove anything else."

On October 9th, Aga Khan Studs announced that Daryz has been retired from racing after won the Prix de l'Arc de Triomphe back-to-back and will be part of Aga Khan Studs roster as stallion.

== Racing statistics ==
Date	Distance (Condition)	Race	Class	Course	Field	Finish	Time (Note: Official time of winning horse. The time written in grey doesn't belong to Daryz.)	Winning (Losing) Margin	Jockey	Winner (2nd place)	Ref
2025 – three-year-old season
Apr 6	2100 m (Good)	Prix Juigné		Longchamp	8	1st	2:13.14	3/4 length	Mickael Barzalona	(Wanderlust)	
May 7	2000 m (Good to Soft)	Prix de Croissy	C2	Longchamp	5	1st	2:06.72	3/4 length	Mickael Barzalona	(Oracle)	
Jun 8	2000 m (Soft)	Prix Ridgway	Listed	Longchamp	5	1st	2:08.75	4 1/2 lengths	Mickael Barzalona	(Poschiavo)	
Jun 29	2000 m (Good to Soft)	Prix Eugène Adam	G2	Saint-Cloud	6	1st	2:09.81	3/4 length	Mickael Barzalona	(Bay City Roller)	
Aug 20	2050 m (Good to Firm)	International Stakes	G1	York	6	6th	2:07.90	(2 1/2 lengths)	Mickael Barzalona	Ombudsman	
Sep 14	2000 m (Very Soft)	Prix du Prince d'Orange	G3	Longchamp	7	2nd	2:11.70	(short head)	Mickael Barzalona	Croix du Nord	
Oct 5	2400 m (Very Soft)	Prix de l'Arc de Triomphe	G1	Longchamp	17	1st	2:29.17	head	Mickael Barzalona	(Minnie Hauk)	
2026 – four-year-old season
Apr 26	2100 m (Good)	Prix Ganay	G1	Longchamp	5	1st	2:10.26	3 1/2 lengths	Mickael Barzalona	(Bright Picture)	
May 21	1850 m (Very Soft)	Prix Aga Khan IV	G1	Longchamp	5	1st	1:54.43	3 1/2 lengths	Mickael Barzalona	(Leffard)	
June 17	2000 m (Good to Soft)	Prince of Wales's Stakes	G1	Ascot	8	3rd	2:03.24	(5 3/4 lengths)	Mickael Barzalona	Ombudsman	
Sep 6	2400 m (Good to Soft)	Prix Foy	G2	Longchamp	4	1st	2:30.89	1 3/4 lengths	Mickael Barzalona	(Bay City Roller)	
Oct 4	2400 m (Good to Soft)	Prix de l'Arc de Triomphe	G1	Longchamp	16	1st	2:27.11	1 1/4 lengths	Mickael Barzalona	(Bay City Roller)	

== Pedigree ==
Pedigree of Daryz (FR), bay stallion 2022
Sire Sea the Stars (IRE) 2006	Cape Cross (IRE); 1994	Green Desert (USA)	Danzig
Sire Sea the Stars (IRE) 2006	Cape Cross (IRE); 1994	Green Desert (USA)	Foreign Courier
Sire Sea the Stars (IRE) 2006	Cape Cross (IRE); 1994	Park Appeal (IRE)	Ahonoora
Sire Sea the Stars (IRE) 2006	Cape Cross (IRE); 1994	Park Appeal (IRE)	Balidaress
Sire Sea the Stars (IRE) 2006	Urban Sea (USA); 1989	Miswaki (USA)	Mr. Prospector
Sire Sea the Stars (IRE) 2006	Urban Sea (USA); 1989	Miswaki (USA)	Hopespringseternal
Sire Sea the Stars (IRE) 2006	Urban Sea (USA); 1989	Allegretta (GB)	Lombard
Sire Sea the Stars (IRE) 2006	Urban Sea (USA); 1989	Allegretta (GB)	Anatevka
Dam Daryakana (FR) 2006	Selkirk (USA); 1988	Sharpen Up (GB)	Atan
Dam Daryakana (FR) 2006	Selkirk (USA); 1988	Sharpen Up (GB)	Rocchetta
Dam Daryakana (FR) 2006	Selkirk (USA); 1988	Annie Edge (IRE)	Nebbiolo
Dam Daryakana (FR) 2006	Selkirk (USA); 1988	Annie Edge (IRE)	Friendly Court
Dam Daryakana (FR) 2006	Daryaba (IRE); 1996	Night Shift (USA)	Northern Dancer
Dam Daryakana (FR) 2006	Daryaba (IRE); 1996	Night Shift (USA)	Ciboulette
Dam Daryakana (FR) 2006	Daryaba (IRE); 1996	Darata (IRE)	Vayrann
Dam Daryakana (FR) 2006	Daryaba (IRE); 1996	Darata (IRE)	Darazina
