= Prix Belle de Nuit =

Flat horse race in France

- Class: Group 3
- Location: Saint-Cloud Racecourse; Saint-Cloud, France
- Race type: Flat / Thoroughbred
- Website: france-galop.com

Race information
- Distance: 2,800 metres (1¾ miles)
- Surface: Turf
- Track: Left-handed
- Qualification: Three-years-old and up fillies and mares exc. G3 winners this year
- Weight: 55½ kg (3yo); 58½ kg (4yo+)
- Purse: €80,000 (2018); 1st: €40,000

The Prix Belle de Nuit is a Group 3 flat horse race in France open to thoroughbred fillies and mares aged three years or older. It is run at Saint-Cloud over a distance of 2,800 metres (about 1¾ miles) each year in October or November.

== History ==
The race was formerly held at Évry, where during the mid-1970s it was run over 1,800 metres. At this time it was classed at Listed level, and for a period it was restricted to three-year-olds. It was extended to 2,400 metres in 1978, and opened to four-year-olds in 1985.

The upper age limit was removed in 1994, when the race was temporarily switched to Saint-Cloud. It returned to Évry in 1995, and was run again at Saint-Cloud in 1996 and 1997. It began a seven-year spell at Maisons-Laffitte in 1998, and was increased to 2,500 metres in 2000. It reverted to 2,400 metres in 2003, and was restored to 2,500 metres in 2004.

For several years thereafter the Prix Belle de Nuit moved to various venues. It took place at Saint-Cloud in 2005, 2006 and 2008, and at Fontainebleau in 2007, 2009 and 2011. It was held at Deauville in 2010, and on this occasion it was run on an artificial surface over 2,400 metres.

The race's current period at Saint-Cloud began in 2012. It was promoted to Group 3 status and extended to 2,800 metres in 2018.

== Records ==
Most successful horse since 1976 (2 wins):

- Sidara – 1987, 1988

Leading jockey since 1976 (5 wins):

- Freddy Head - Sevres (1977), Souveraine (1978), Eternity (1980), Princesse Vali (1982), Dancing Vaguely (1984)

Leading trainer since 1976 (5 wins):

- André Fabre – Sidara (1987, 1988), Hijaz (1999), Luna Sacra (2001), Sassella (2015)

Leading owner since 1976 (3 wins):

- HH Aga Khan IV – Kermiya (1976), Nawazish (1981), Behkara (2004)
- Alec Head – Sevres (1977), Souveraine (1978), Eternity (1980)
- Jean-Luc Lagardère – Majority (1979), Karmichah (1989), Luna Sacra (2001)

== Winners since 1976 ==
Year	Winner	Age	Jockey	Trainer	Owner	Time
1976	Kermiya	3	Henri Samani	François Mathet	HH Aga Khan IV
1977	Sevres	3	Freddy Head	Christian Datessen	Alec Head
1978	Souveraine	3	Freddy Head	Criquette Head	Alec Head	2:33.50
1979	Majority	3	Philippe Paquet	François Boutin	Jean-Luc Lagardère	2:37.00
1980	Eternity	3	Freddy Head	Criquette Head	Alec Head	2:42.70
1981	Nawazish	3	Yves Saint-Martin	François Mathet	HH Aga Khan IV	2:50.10
1982	Princesse Vali	3	Freddy Head	Alec Head	Jacques Wertheimer	2:52.00
1983	Miss Mulaz	3	Gérard Dubroeucq	Robert Collet	Owen Helman	2:38.80
1984	Dancing Vaguely	3	Freddy Head	Criquette Head	Robert Sangster	2:55.00
1985	Soaring	4	Richard Briard	Georges Bridgland	Georges Bridgland	2:29.90
1986	Houwayda	3	Dominique Boeuf	Jean-Paul Gallorini	Philippe Lemoine-Boucaud	2:44.80
1987	Sidara	3	Alain Lequeux	André Fabre	Khalid Abdullah	2:45.67
1988	Sidara	4	Cash Asmussen	André Fabre	Khalid Abdullah	2:36.54
1989	Karmichah	3	Gérald Mossé	François Boutin	Jean-Luc Lagardère	2:32.30
1990	Anna's Honor	3	Marc de Smyter	Jonathan Pease	Mrs Daniel Beresford	2:31.03
1991	Gloria Mundi	4	Dominique Boeuf	François Doumen	Marie-Joëlle Levesque	2:45.41
1992	Egyptown	3	Éric Legrix	Criquette Head	Jacques Wertheimer	2:50.94
1993	Valley Quest	3	Cash Asmussen	François Boutin	Lady O'Reilly	2:42.70
1994	Count Me Out	4	Thierry Gillet	J. Bertran de Balanda	Magalen Bryant	2:53.80
1995	Maid of Honor	3	William Mongil	Jean de Roualle	Mabel de Forest	2:42.28
1996	Reine Wells	3	Thierry Jarnet	Pascal Bary	Scuderia Pieffegi	2:56.70
1997	Lexa	3	Dominique Boeuf	Helena van Zuylen	Thierry van Zuylen	2:54.70
1998	Mondschein	3	Thierry Thulliez	John Dunlop	Benny Andersson	2:52.40
1999	Hijaz	3	Alain Junk	André Fabre	Sultan Al Kabeer	2:46.10
2000	Seren Hill	4	Kevin Darley	Gerard Butler	The Fairy Story Partnership	2:59.80
2001	Luna Sacra	3	Mathias Sautjeau	André Fabre	Jean-Luc Lagardère	2:49.80
2002	La Paz (Note: Moon Search finished first in 2002, but she was later disqualified after testing positive for a banned substance)	3	Thierry Jarnet	John Gosden	George Strawbridge	2:52.10
2003	Sweet Stream	3	Thierry Gillet	John Hammond	Team Valor	2:44.00
2004	Behkara	4	Thierry Jarnet	Alain de Royer-Dupré	HH Aga Khan IV	2:52.60
2005	Pilgrim of Grace	4	Sébastien Maillot	Fabrice Cohen	William Green	2:56.50
2006	Ponte Tresa	3	Olivier Peslier	Yves de Nicolay	Erika Hilger	2:49.50
2007	Alma mater	4	Jean-Bernard Eyquem	Sir Mark Prescott	Kirsten Rausing	2:43.40
2008	Believe Me	4	Thierry Jarnet	Alain de Royer-Dupré	Malcolm Parrish	3:00.30
2009	Wysiwyg Lucky	6	Gregory Benoist	Jean-Louis Gay	Nadine Petit-Lévi	2:49.60
2010	Terre du Vent	4	Fabrice Veron	Yves de Nicolay	Claude Lambert	2:33.40
2011	Racemate	3	Thierry Thulliez	Stéphane Wattel	Laurent Haegel	2:47.00
2012	Petra	4	Gregory Benoist	Yann-Marie Porzier	Camille Garnier	3:01.10
2013	Modern Eagle	3	Antoine Hamelin	Alain de Royer-Dupré	Ballymore Thoroughbred Ltd	3:06.65
2014	Crystal Diamond	3	Aurélien Lemaitre	Freddy Head	Jaber Abdullah	2:49.15
2015	Sassella	3	Mickael Barzalona	André Fabre	Gestüt Ammerland	3:03.70
2016	Diamonds Pour Moi	3	Alexis Badel	Ralph Beckett	Pearl Bloodstock Ltd	2:58.55
2017	Bebe d'Amour	3	Stéphane Pasquier	Jean-Yves Artu	Jean-Yves Artu	2:55.10
2018	Bartaba	3	Maxime Guyon	André Fabre	Wertheimer et Frère	3:11.12
2019	Monica Sheriff	3	Tom Marquand	William Haggas	Duke of Devonshire	3:19.81
2020	Believe In Love	3	Mickael Barzalona	Roger Varian	Koji Maeda	3:22.11
2021	Control Tower	4	Cristian Demuro	Nicolas Clement	Mme Stella Thayer	3:11.43
2022	Lastochka	3	Theo Bachelot	Jean-Marie Beguigne	Noël Forgeard, Patric Bonnier Et Al.	3:20.62
2023	Caius Chorister	4	Oisin Murphy	David Menuisier	Clive Washbourn	3:11.96

== See also ==
- List of French flat horse races
