= List of French flat horse races =

A list of notable flat horse races which take place annually in France, under the authority of France Galop, including all conditions races which currently hold Group 1, 2 or 3 status in the European Pattern.

The races in bold are run on an all-weather surface, and horses' names which are in italics won that race in the previous season.

Group status is conferred by the European Pattern Committee, which sanctions races across the principal European racing nations as Group 1, 2, 3 or Listed and reviews the classification each year, upgrading, downgrading or merging races. France Galop publishes the resulting French programme annually, its 2026 flat black type brochure appearing on 19 February 2026.

== Group 1 ==
Month	Race Name	Racecourse	Dist. (m)	Age/Sex	2026 winner
April	Prix Ganay	Longchamp	2,100	4yo+	Daryz
May	Poule d'Essai des Poulains	Longchamp	1,600	3yo c	Rayif
May	Poule d'Essai des Pouliches	Longchamp	1,600	3yo f	Diamond Necklace
May	Prix Aga Khan IV (Prix d'Ispahan)	Longchamp	1,850	4yo+	Daryz
May	Prix Vicomtesse Vigier	Longchamp	3,100	4yo+	Caballo De Mar
May	Prix du Jockey Club	Chantilly	2,100	3yo c&f	Constitution River
June	Prix de Diane	Chantilly	2,100	3yo f	Diamond Necklace
July	Grand Prix de Saint-Cloud	Saint-Cloud	2,400	4yo+	Calandagan
July	Prix Jean Prat	Deauville	1,400	3yo c&f	Thesecretadversary
July	Grand Prix de Paris	Longchamp	2,400	3yo c&f	Maltese Cross
August	Prix Rothschild	Deauville	1,600	3yo+ f	Blue Bolt
August	Prix Maurice de Gheest	Deauville	1,300	3yo+	Samangan
August	Prix Jacques Le Marois	Deauville	1,600	3yo+ c&f	Rayif
August	Prix Morny	Deauville	1,200	2yo c&f	Senorita Bonita
August	Prix Jean et Louis Romanet	Deauville	2,000	3yo+ f	Aventure
September	Prix Vermeille	Longchamp	2,400	3yo+ f	Friendly Soul
September	Prix du Moulin de Longchamp	Longchamp	1,600	3yo+	Erdenali
October	Prix de Royallieu	Longchamp	2,800	3yo+ f	Fairy Glen
October	Prix du Cadran	Longchamp	4,000	4yo+	Caballo De Mar
October	Prix Marcel Boussac	Longchamp	1,600	2yo f	Green Empress
October	Prix Jean-Luc Lagardère	Longchamp	1,400	2yo c&f	Amusingly
October	Prix de l'Abbaye de Longchamp	Longchamp	1,000	2yo+	Miss Yechance
October	Prix de l'Arc de Triomphe	Longchamp	2,400	3yo+ c&f	Daryz
October	Prix de l'Opéra	Longchamp	2,000	3yo+ f	Miss Scott
October	Prix de la Forêt	Longchamp	1,400	3yo+	True Love
October	Critérium International	Saint-Cloud	1,600	2yo c&f	Master Man
October	Critérium de Saint-Cloud	Saint-Cloud	2,000	2yo c&f	Drumbeat
October	Prix Royal-Oak	Saint-Cloud	3,100	3yo+	Queenstown

== Group 2 ==
Month	Race Name	Racecourse	Dist. (m)	Age/Sex	2026 winner
April	Prix d'Harcourt	Longchamp	2,000	4yo+	Bright Picture
May	Prix du Muguet	Saint-Cloud	1,600	4yo+	No Lunch
May	Prix Greffulhe	Saint-Cloud	2,000	3yo	Alam
May	Prix Saint-Alary	Longchamp	2,000	3yo f	Lapotheose
May	Prix Corrida	Longchamp	2,100	4yo+ f	Aventure
May	Grand Prix de Chantilly	Chantilly	2,400	4yo+	Goliath
May	Prix de Sandringham	Chantilly	1,600	3yo f	Naomis
June	Prix Paul de Moussac	Longchamp	1,400	3yo	Nighttime
June	Prix Eugène Adam	Saint-Cloud	2,000	3yo	Pearled Majesty
July	Prix de Malleret	Longchamp	2,400	3yo f	Behrayna
July	Prix Maurice de Nieuil	Longchamp	2,800	4yo+	Sons And Lovers
July	Prix Robert Papin	Chantilly	1,200	2yo	Tokaido
August	Prix de Pomone	Deauville	2,500	3yo+ f	Rabbit's Foot
August	Prix Guillaume d'Ornano	Deauville	2,000	3yo	Baroud
August	Prix du Calvados	Deauville	1,400	2yo f	Woot Woot
August	Prix Kergorlay	Deauville	3,000	3yo+	Defiantly
August	Grand Prix de Deauville	Deauville	2,500	3yo+	Al Aasy
September	Prix d'Aumale	Longchamp	1,600	2yo f	Rogue Passion
September	Prix Niel	Longchamp	2,400	3yo	Varandir
September	Prix Foy	Longchamp	2,400	4yo+	Daryz
October	Prix Chaudenay	Longchamp	3,000	3yo	Jabracadabra
October	Prix Dollar	Longchamp	1,950	3yo+	Wimbledon Hawkeye
October	Prix Daniel Wildenstein	Longchamp	1,600	3yo+	Qirat
October	Critérium de Maisons-Laffitte	Chantilly	1,200	2yo	Al Hamaad
October	Prix du Conseil de Paris	Longchamp	2,200	3yo+	Rembrand To Go

== Group 3 ==
Month	Race Name	Racecourse	Dist. (m)	Age/Sex	2026 winner
March	Prix Exbury	Saint-Cloud	2,000	4yo+	Bright Picture
March	Prix Edmond Blanc	Saint-Cloud	1,600	4yo+	Dreamliner
April	Prix La Force	Longchamp	1,800	3yo c&g	Segall
April	Prix Vanteaux	Longchamp	1,800	3yo f	Concorde Agreement
April	Prix Djebel	Deauville	1,400	3yo c&g	Afandy
April	Prix Imprudence	Deauville	1,400	3yo f	Showna
April	Prix de la Grotte	Longchamp	1,600	3yo f	Evolutionist
April	Prix de Fontainebleau	Longchamp	1,600	3yo c&g	Komorebi
April	Prix Noailles	Longchamp	2,100	3yo	Pearled Majesty
April	Prix Sigy	Chantilly	1,100	3yo	My Calyx Cen
April	Prix Cléopâtre	Saint-Cloud	2,100	3yo f	Gilded Prize
April	Prix de Barbeville	Longchamp	3,000	4yo+	Asmarani
May	Prix Allez France	Saint-Cloud	2,000	4yo+ f	Sunly
May	Prix d'Hédouville	Longchamp	2,400	4yo+	Best Secret
May	Prix de Guiche	Chantilly	1,800	3yo c&g	Hawk Mountain
May	Prix de Saint-Georges	Longchamp	1,000	3yo+	Rayevka
May	Prix Texanita	Chantilly	1,200	3yo	Dostoievsky
May	Prix du Palais-Royal	Longchamp	1,400	3yo+	Lazzat
May	Prix Hocquart	Longchamp	2,200	3yo	Varandir
May	Prix de Royaumont	Chantilly	2,400	3yo f	Behrayna
May	Prix du Gros Chêne	Chantilly	1,000	3yo+	Sajir
June	La Coupe	Longchamp	2,000	4yo+	Nitoi
June	Prix Bertrand du Breuil	Chantilly	1,600	3yo+	Remmooz
June	Prix du Lys	Chantilly	2,400	3yo	Space Waltz
June	Prix de la Porte Maillot	Longchamp	1,400	3yo+	Khovikhov
June	Prix du Bois	Chantilly (Note: Run at Deauville in 2026 due to heat wave conditions at Chantilly)	1,200	2yo	Tokaido
July	Prix de Ris-Orangis	Deauville	1,200	3yo+	Mise En Boite
July	Prix Chloé	Chantilly	1,800	3yo f	Jennifer Jane
July	Prix Messidor	Chantilly	1,600	3yo+	Silius
July	Grand Prix de Vichy	Vichy	2,000	3yo+	Zaydann
August	Prix Six Perfections	Deauville	1,400	2yo f	Data
August	Prix de Cabourg	Deauville	1,200	2yo	Kosuma
August	Prix de Psyché	Deauville	2,000	3yo f	Symbol Of Majesty
August	Prix de Reux	Deauville	2,500	3yo+	Mazzala
August	Prix Daphnis	Deauville	1,600	3yo	Distant Storm
August	Prix de Lieurey	Deauville	1,600	3yo f	Hassaleh
August	Prix Gontaut-Biron	Deauville	2,000	4yo+	Wimbledon Hawkeye
August	Prix Minerve	Deauville	2,500	3yo f	Romantic Symphony
August	Prix François Boutin	Deauville	1,400	2yo	Avec Toi
August	Prix Quincey	Deauville	1,600	3yo+	Diego Ventura
August	Prix de Meautry	Deauville	1,200	3yo+	Great Wish
September	Prix d'Arenberg	Longchamp	1,000	2yo	Drazinda
September	Prix Gérald de Geoffre	Longchamp	3,000	3yo	Victoire Magique
September	Prix La Rochette	Longchamp	1,400	2yo	Avec Toi
September	Prix Gladiateur	Longchamp	3,100	4yo+	Odemar
September	Prix du Petit Couvert	Longchamp	1,000	3yo+	Naana's Shadow
September	Prix du Pin	Longchamp	1,400	3yo+	Fort Payne
September	Prix du Prince d'Orange	Longchamp	2,000	3yo+	Phineas
September	Prix des Chênes	Chantilly	1,600	2yo c&g	Zakkan
September	Prix Eclipse	Chantilly	1,200	2yo	Primetime Emmy
September	Prix Bertrand de Tarragon	Chantilly	1,800	3yo+ f	Anakova
October	Prix de Condé	Saint-Cloud	2,000	2yo	Just Yet
October	Prix de Flore	Saint-Cloud	2,100	3yo+ f	Miss Justice
October	Prix Perth	Saint-Cloud	1,600	3yo+	Half Half
October	Prix Belle de Nuit	Saint-Cloud	2,800	3yo+ f	Eleganz
October	Prix des Réservoirs	Chantilly	1,600	2yo f	Coaxed
October	Prix de Seine-et-Oise	Chantilly	1,200	3yo+	Valasara
November	Prix Fille de l'Air	Toulouse	2,100	3yo+ f	Spirit Of Zarak
**November**	**Prix Thomas Bryon**	**Chantilly**	**1,800**	**2yo**	**Wykehurst Park**
**November**	**Prix Miesque**	**Chantilly**	**1,400**	**2yo f**	**Reina Sioux**

== Discontinued ==
**Last Run**	**Race Name**	**Racecourse**	**Dist. (m)**	**Age/Sex**
April 1977	Prix Daru	Longchamp	2,100	3yo
September 2000	Prix de la Salamandre	Longchamp	1,400	2yo c&f
November 2000	Prix Saint-Roman	Saint-Cloud	1,600	2yo f
May 2003	Prix Jean de Chaudenay	Saint-Cloud	2,400	4yo+
July 2003	Prix Berteux	Deauville	3,000	3yo
May 2004	Prix Lupin	Longchamp	2,100	3yo c&f
