= Forever Together (Irish horse) =

Irish-bred Thoroughbred racehorse

- Racing silks of Michael Tabor
- Sire: Galileo
- Grandsire: Sadler's Wells
- Dam: Green Room
- Damsire: Theatrical
- Sex: Filly
- Foaled: 25 May 2015
- Country: Ireland
- Colour: Bay
- Breeder: Vimal and Gillian Khosla
- Owner: Susan Magnier, Michael Tabor and Derrick Smith
- Trainer: Aidan O'Brien

Major wins
- Oaks Stakes (2018)

Forever Together (foaled 25 May 2015) is an Irish Thoroughbred racehorse best known for winning the 2018 Epsom Oaks.

== Background ==
Forever Together is a bay mare with a white star and snip bred in Ireland by the entrepreneur Vimal Khosla and his wife Gillian. She was sired by Galileo, who won the Derby, Irish Derby and King George VI and Queen Elizabeth Stakes in 2001 before becoming one of the world's leading stallions. Her dam Green Room an unraced daughter of the Breeders' Cup Turf winner Theatrical and had previously produced both Together Forever and Lord Shanakill, a horse whose wins included the Prix Jean Prat. Green Room's dam Chain Fern was full-sister of the leading racehorse and broodmare Al Bahathri.

As a yearling the filly was consigned to the Goffs Orby sale in September 2016. She was bought for €900,000 by Michael Magnier, acting on behalf of the Coolmore Stud organisation. The filly was sent into training with Aidan O'Brien at Ballydoyle. Like many of the Coolmore racehorses the details of her ownership have changed from race to race: she has sometimes been listed as being owned by Susan Magnier whilst on other occasions she has been described as the property of a partnership involving Magnier, Derrick Smith and Michael Tabor.

== Racing career ==
=== 2017: two-year-old season ===
Forever Together ran twice as a two-year-old in 2017, being ridden on both occasions by Wayne Lordan. She made her debut in a one-mile maiden race at Naas Racecourse on 4 October in which she started at odds of 10/1. After starting poorly she stayed on well without ever looking likely to win and finished fourth of the ten runners, more than six lengths behind the winner Who's Steph. Eighteen days later at Leopardstown Racecourse she started at 100/30 for a similar event and came home third behind Contingent and Alghabrah after disputing the lead for most of the way.

=== 2018: three-year-old season ===
For her first appearance as a three-year-old, Forever Together was sent to England and stepped up in class for the Listed Cheshire Oaks (a trial race for the Epsom Oaks) over one and a half miles at Chester Racecourse on 9 May. Ridden by her trainer's son Donnacha O'Brien she started the 11/2 third choice in the betting behind her stablemate Magic Wand and the Ralph Beckett-trained Kinaesthesia. After encountering considerable trouble in running and struggling to obtain a clear run she was eased down in the final strides and finished second, three and a half lengths behind Magic Wand.

The 240th running of the Oaks Stakes, run on soft ground at Epsom Racecourse on 1 June attracted a field of nine fillies with the Prix Marcel Boussac winner Wild Illusion starting the 5/2 favourite. Forever Together, with Donnacha O'Brien again in the saddle went off at odds of 7/1 while the other fancied runners included Magic Wand, Perfect Clarity (Lingfield Oaks Trial), Give and Take (Musidora Stakes) and Bye Bye Baby (Blue Wind Stakes). Bye Bye Baby set the pace with Forever Together settled behind the leaders before turning into the straight in fourth place. After tracking across to the stands-side rail, Forever Together took the lead approaching the final furlong and drew away to win by four and a half lengths from Wild Illusion, with three and a half lengths back to Bye Bye Baby in third.

== Pedigree ==
Pedigree of Forever Together (IRE), bay filly, 2015
Sire Galileo (IRE) 1998	Sadler's Wells (USA); 1981	Northern Dancer	Nearctic
Sire Galileo (IRE) 1998	Sadler's Wells (USA); 1981	Northern Dancer	Natalma
Sire Galileo (IRE) 1998	Sadler's Wells (USA); 1981	Fairy Bridge	Bold Reason
Sire Galileo (IRE) 1998	Sadler's Wells (USA); 1981	Fairy Bridge	Special
Sire Galileo (IRE) 1998	Urban Sea (USA); 1989	Miswaki	Mr. Prospector
Sire Galileo (IRE) 1998	Urban Sea (USA); 1989	Miswaki	Hopespringseternal
Sire Galileo (IRE) 1998	Urban Sea (USA); 1989	Allegretta	Lombard
Sire Galileo (IRE) 1998	Urban Sea (USA); 1989	Allegretta	Anatevka
Dam Green Room (USA) 2002	Theatrical (IRE); 1982	Nureyev	Northern Dancer
Dam Green Room (USA) 2002	Theatrical (IRE); 1982	Nureyev	Special
Dam Green Room (USA) 2002	Theatrical (IRE); 1982	Tree of Knowledge	Sassafras
Dam Green Room (USA) 2002	Theatrical (IRE); 1982	Tree of Knowledge	Sensibility
Dam Green Room (USA) 2002	Chain Fern (USA); 1986	Blushing Groom	Red God
Dam Green Room (USA) 2002	Chain Fern (USA); 1986	Blushing Groom	Runaway Bride
Dam Green Room (USA) 2002	Chain Fern (USA); 1986	Chain Store	Nodouble
Dam Green Room (USA) 2002	Chain Fern (USA); 1986	Chain Store	General Store (Family 9-e)

- Forever Together is inbred 3 × 4 to Northern Dancer meaning that this stallion appears in both the third and fourth generations of her pedigree.
