= Pour Moi (horse) =

Irish-bred Thoroughbred racehorse

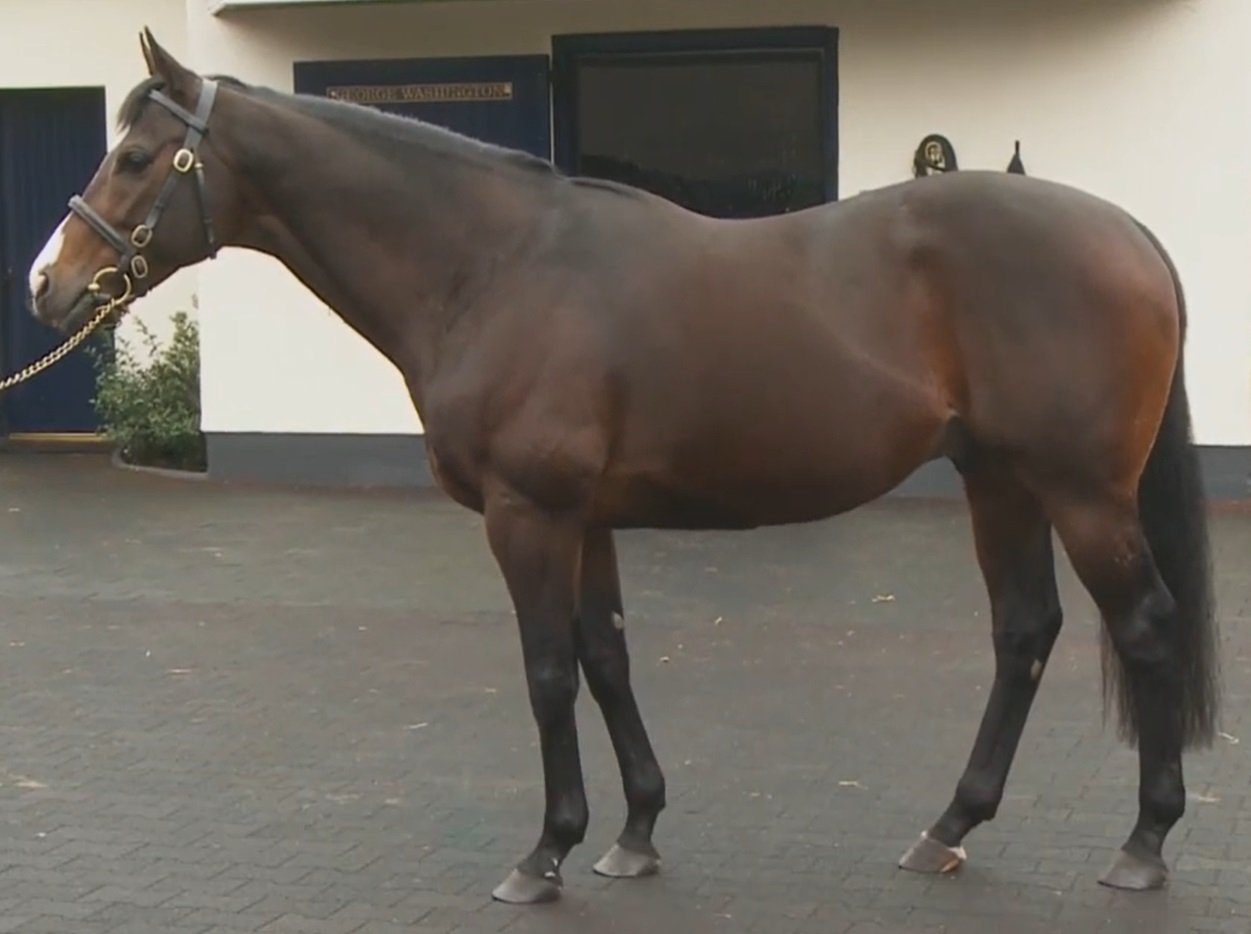
- Pour Moi at Coolmore Stud Ireland 2015
- Sire: Montjeu
- Grandsire: Sadler's Wells
- Dam: Gwynn
- Damsire: Darshaan
- Sex: Stallion
- Foaled: 10 January 2008
- Country: Ireland
- Colour: Bay
- Breeder: Lynch Bages, Ltd.
- Owner: Sue Magnier, Michael Tabor and Derrick Smith
- Trainer: André Fabre
- Record: 5:3-0-1
- Earnings: £798,893

Major wins
- Prix Greffulhe (2011); Epsom Derby (2011)
- Last updated on 5 June 2011

Pour Moi (foaled 10 January 2008) is an Irish-bred and French-trained thoroughbred racehorse and sire. In his racing career, he ran five times between September 2010 and June 2011, and won three races, including the 2011 Epsom Derby. His career was ended by injury before he could run again and he was retired to stud.

== Background ==
Pour Moi a bay horse with a white blaze who stands 15.3 hands high was bred in Ireland by Lynch Bages Ltd. Pour Moi is one of many top-class middle-distance horses and stayers sired by Montjeu. Others include the Derby winners Authorized and Motivator, the St Leger winners Scorpion and Masked Marvel and the Prix de l'Arc de Triomphe winner Hurricane Run. Pour Moi is one of four winners produced by the mare Gwynn: her previous best runner was the Prix Penelope winner Gagnoa. Pour Moi was trained at Chantilly by André Fabre.

== Racing career ==
=== 2010: two-year-old season ===
Pour Moi made his first racecourse appearance in a 1600m race at Fontainebleau in September 2010. He started slowly and was not given a hard race by his rider Damien Mescam, finishing eighth of the ten runners. A month later, Pour Moi started at odds of 15/1 in the Prix des Feuillants at Longchamp. Ridden on this occasion by Mickael Barzalona, he was settled in fourth place before producing a strong finish to win by a neck from the odds-on favourite Oppenort.

=== 2011: three-year-old season ===
Pour Moi made his three-year-old debut in the Prix La Force over 2100m at Longchamp in April. He did not settle in the early stages but finished well to finish third to Baraan and Prairie Star. He came into Derby consideration with his performance in the Prix Greffulhe at Saint-Cloud on 7 May. After being last in the early running he was switched to the outside in the straight and overtook the entire field to win by one and a half lengths.

He was made second-favourite for the 2011 Epsom Derby, behind Queen Elizabeth II's Dante Stakes winner Carlton House. In the race, he again settled in last place, and was still several lengths off the lead with a furlong to go. However, he unleashed a significant burst of speed over the last furlong to beat Treasure Beach by a head, with 5/2 favourite Carlton House third. Pour Moi was ridden by 19-year-old French jockey Mickael Barzalona, who stood up in the saddle in celebration just prior to the winning post. The Epsom stewards issued Barzalona with a warning for his behaviour as well as giving him a one-day ban for excessive use of the whip. The win made Pour Moi the first French-trained winner of the Derby since Empery in 1976.

== Injury and retirement ==
Fabre rested Pour Moi after his Derby win until August when the trainer began to work him in preparation for the Prix de l'Arc de Triomphe in October 2011, a race for which he was favourite. However, while exercising on 26 August he "badly over-reached himself on his off-fore", suffering a serious leg injury. He was retired from racing as a result, becoming the first Derby winner never to run again since Secreto in 1984. Though Secreto not running again after his Derby win was not due to injury.

== Race record ==
Date	Race	Dist (f)	Course	Class	Prize (£K)	Odds	Runners	Placing	Margin	Time	Jockey	Trainer
23 September 2010	Prix des Lievres	8	Fontainebleau		5	7/2	10	8	9	1:42.00	Damien Mescam	André Fabre
24 October 2010	Prix des Feuillants	9	Longchamp		15	15/1	5	1	Neck	1:55.60	Mickael Barzalona	André Fabre
10 April 2011	Prix La Force	10.5	Longchamp	3	34	12/1	5	3	1.5	2:15.30	Mickael Barzalona	André Fabre
7 May 2011	Prix Greffulhe	10	Saint-Cloud	2	64	12/1	9	1	1.5	2:03.20	Mickael Barzalona	André Fabre
4 June 2011	Derby	12	Epsom	1	710	4/1	13	1	Head	2:34.54	Mickael Barzalona	André Fabre

== Stud career ==
Pour Moi was retired to the Coolmore Stud's Irish base. His stud fee for 2012 was set at €20,000. In his second season at stud he sired The Derby winner Wings of Eagles.

== Pedigree ==
Pedigree of Pour Moi (IRE), bay stallion, 2008
Sire Montjeu (IRE) 1996	Sadler's Wells; 1981	Northern Dancer*	Nearctic
Sire Montjeu (IRE) 1996	Sadler's Wells; 1981	Northern Dancer*	Natalma
Sire Montjeu (IRE) 1996	Sadler's Wells; 1981	Fairy Bridge	Bold Reason
Sire Montjeu (IRE) 1996	Sadler's Wells; 1981	Fairy Bridge	Special
Sire Montjeu (IRE) 1996	Floripedes; 1985	Top Ville	High Top
Sire Montjeu (IRE) 1996	Floripedes; 1985	Top Ville	Sega Ville
Sire Montjeu (IRE) 1996	Floripedes; 1985	Toute Cy	Tennyson
Sire Montjeu (IRE) 1996	Floripedes; 1985	Toute Cy	Adele Toumignon
Dam Gwynn (IRE) 1997	Darshaan; 1981	Shirley Heights	Mill Reef
Dam Gwynn (IRE) 1997	Darshaan; 1981	Shirley Heights	Hardiemma
Dam Gwynn (IRE) 1997	Darshaan; 1981	Delsy	Abdos
Dam Gwynn (IRE) 1997	Darshaan; 1981	Delsy	Kelty
Dam Gwynn (IRE) 1997	Victoress; 1984	Conquistador Cielo	Mr. Prospector
Dam Gwynn (IRE) 1997	Victoress; 1984	Conquistador Cielo	K D Princess
Dam Gwynn (IRE) 1997	Victoress; 1984	Royal Statute	Northern Dancer*
Dam Gwynn (IRE) 1997	Victoress; 1984	Royal Statute	Queen's Statute (Family: 22)

Pour Moi is inbred 3x4 to Northern Dancer. This means that the stallion appears in both the third and fourth generations of his pedigree.
