= Prix de Lieurey =

Flat horse race in France

- Class: Group 3
- Location: Deauville Racecourse; Deauville, France
- Inaugurated: 1972
- Race type: Flat / Thoroughbred
- Website: france-galop.com

Race information
- Distance: 1,600 metres (1 mile)
- Surface: Turf
- Track: Right-handed
- Qualification: Three-year-old fillies exc. G2 winners this year
- Weight: 56 kg Penalties; 2 kg if Group 2 second* 2 kg for Group 3 winners * * since January 1
- Purse: €80,000 (2021); 1st: €40,000

Prix de Lieurey
2025
Better Together	Relaxx	Simmering

Previous years
2024
Soprano	Rose Bloom	See You Around
2023
Elounda Queen	Dabawa	Mystic Pearl
2022
Oscula	By All Means	Samahram
2021
Cloudy Dawn	Just Beautiful	Pamouschana

2020-2011
2020
Irska	Althiqa	Cloak Of Spirits
2019
Fount	Twist 'N' Shake	Commes
2018
Wind Chimes	Poetic Charm	Adorable
2017
Lady Frankel	Tisbutadream	Limited Edition
2016
Trixia	Chartreuse	Aim To Please
2015
Maimara	Moonlight In Paris	Excilly
2014
Bawina	Indian Rainbow	Visoriyna
2013
Zibelina	Table Ronde	Siyenica
2012
Sarkiyla	Foreign Tune	Dream Clover
2011
Sandy's Charm	Mixed Intention	Rhythm Of Light

2010-2001
2010
Via Medici	Field Day	Rockatella
2009
Soneva	Emergency	Wilside
2008
Sefroua	Trip To Glory	Quarayed
2007
Cicerole	Turfrose	In The Light
2006
Gwenseb	Tonic Star	Sabana Perdida
2005
In Clover	Here She Comes	Marine Bleue
2004
Mamela	Belle Ange	Tulipe Royale
2003
Zietory	Gonfilia	Visorama
2002
Mooring	Kane Ore	Summertime Legacy
2001
Shawara	Les Yeux Mauves	Five Fishes

2000-1991
2000
May Ball	Peony	Ever In Love
1999
Tycoon's Dolce	Oriental Fashion	Lady Ilsley
1998
Soeur Ti	Pan Galactic	Orford Ness
1997
Kool Kat Katie	Basse Besogne	Libria
1996
Moon Is Up	Daneskaya	Miss Riviera
1995
Vadlamixa	Marie De Ken	Nagnagnag
1994
Desert Kaya	Nimitel	Sail Storm
1993
Lost Prairie	Seattle Victory	Aisla
1992
Irish Source	Battle Quest	Greek Air
1991
Quilesse	Wassila	Saraposa

The Prix de Lieurey is a Group 3 flat horse race in France open to three-year-old thoroughbred fillies. It is run at Deauville over a distance of 1,600 metres (about 1 mile), and it is scheduled to take place each year in August.

== History ==
The event is named after Lieurey, a commune located in the Eure department in the Upper Normandy region of France. It was established in 1972, and it was initially contested over 2,400 metres. It was cut to 1,600 metres in 1977, and given Listed status in 1987.

The Prix de Lieurey was sponsored by Haras des Capucines in 2004, and by Shadwell from 2005 to 2010. It was promoted to Group 3 level in 2009.

== Records ==
Leading jockey since 1978 (5 wins):
- Thierry Jarnet – Lost Prairie (1993), Desert Kaya (1994), Vadlamixa (1995), Soeur Ti (1998), Zietory (2003)
- Olivier Peslier – Irish Source (1992), Kool Kat Katie (1997), Gwenseb (2006), Bawina (2014), Trixia (2016)

Leading trainer since 1979 (7 wins):

- André Fabre – J'ai Deux Amours (1989), Lost Prairie (1993), Desert Kaya (1994), Vadlamixa (1995), Lady Frankel (2017), Wind Chimes (2018), Fount (2019)

Leading owner since 1979 (3 wins):

- Ecurie Aland – Sentimentalite (1986), Liska's Dance (1987), Most Precious (1988)
- Jean-Luc Lagardère – Pinaflore (1990), Desert Kaya (1994), Vadlamixa (1995)

== Winners since 1978 ==
Year	Winner	Jockey	Trainer	Owner	Time
1978	Heresty	Alfred Gibert			1:39.90
1979	Magic Pearl	Michel Gentile	Freddie Palmer	Gérard de Waldner
1980	Trephine	Philippe Paquet	François Boutin	Elisabeth Couturié
1981	Tysfjsa	Philippe Paquet	François Boutin	Baron van Gysel
1982	Pasadoble	Gary W. Moore	François Boutin	Stavros Niarchos
1983	Tearing	Lester Piggott	David Smaga	Xavier Beau
1984	Albertine	Éric Legrix	Patrick Biancone	Daniel Wildenstein
1985	Just in Front	Yves Saint-Martin	Robert Collet	William du Pont III
1986	Sentimentalite	Yves Saint-Martin	Criquette Head	Ecurie Aland
1987	Liska's Dance	Gary W. Moore	Criquette Head	Ecurie Aland
1988	Most Precious	Gary W. Moore	Criquette Head	Ecurie Aland	1:48.00
1989	J'ai Deux Amours	Cash Asmussen	André Fabre	Claude Puerari
1990	Pinaflore	Gérald Mossé	François Boutin	Jean-Luc Lagardère
1991	Quilesse	Freddy Head	Nicolas Clément	Stavros Niarchos	1:45.50
1992	Irish Source	Olivier Peslier	Arnaud de Moussac	Andrew Crichton	1:53.90
1993	Lost Prairie	Thierry Jarnet	André Fabre	Daniel Wildenstein	1:43.00
1994	Desert Kaya	Thierry Jarnet	André Fabre	Jean-Luc Lagardère	1:45.40
1995	Vadlamixa	Thierry Jarnet	André Fabre	Jean-Luc Lagardère	1:44.60
1996	Moon Is Up	Cash Asmussen	John Hammond	Niarchos Family	1:44.30
1997	Kool Kat Katie	Olivier Peslier	David Loder	Lucayan Stud	1:42.20
1998	Soeur Ti	Thierry Jarnet	Robert Collet	Micheline Vidal	1:44.80
1999	Tycoon's Dolce	Sylvain Guillot	Robert Collet	Richard C. Strauss	1:46.90
2000	May Ball	Frankie Dettori	John Gosden	Lord Hartington	1:44.10
2001	Shawara	Gérald Mossé	Alain de Royer-Dupré	HH Aga Khan IV	1:42.60
2002	Mooring	Thierry Thulliez	Pascal Bary	Khalid Abdullah	1:42.40
2003	Zietory	Thierry Jarnet	Paul Cole	Fairy Story Partnership	1:43.90
2004	Mamela	Dominique Boeuf	Andreas Löwe	Stall Tessie	1:46.50
2005	In Clover	Davy Bonilla	Freddy Head	George Strawbridge	1:48.20
2006	Gwenseb	Olivier Peslier	Carlos Laffon-Parias	Wertheimer et Frère	1:43.80
2007	Cicerole	Christophe Lemaire	Jean-Claude Rouget	Exors of G. de Rothschild	1:44.50
2008	Sefroua	Ioritz Mendizabal	Jean-Claude Rouget	Nelson Radwan	1:44.90
2009	Soneva	Christophe Soumillon	Yves de Nicolay	Arno Curty	1:45.50
2010	Via Medici	François-Xavier Bertras	François Rohaut	Haras de Saint Pair	1:41.30
2011	Sandy's Charm	François-Xavier Bertras	François Rohaut	Magalen Bryant	1:41.47
2012	Sarkiyla	Christophe Lemaire	Alain de Royer-Dupré	HH Aga Khan IV	1:42.70
2013	Zibelina	Mickael Barzalona	Charlie Appleby	Godolphin	1:40.91
2014	Bawina	Olivier Peslier	Carlos Laffon-Parias	Wertheimer et Frère	1:44.68
2015	Maimara	Grégory Benoist	Mikel Delzangles	Alain Louis-Dreyfus	1:43.15
2016	Trixia	Olivier Peslier	Alain de Royer-Dupré	Jean-Claude Seroul	1:43.33
2017	Lady Frankel	Pierre-Charles Boudot	André Fabre	Gestut Ammerland	1:41.02
2018	Wind Chimes	Pierre-Charles Boudot	André Fabre	Smith, Magnier & Tabor	1:42.17
2019	Fount	Pierre-Charles Boudot	André Fabre	Khalid Abdullah	1:42.95
2020	Irska	Hugo Journiac	Markus Nigge	Lutz Bongen	1:46.67
2021	Cloudy Dawn	Vincent Cheminaud	William Haggas	James Wigan	1:41.32
2022	Oscula	Ryan Moore	George Boughey	Nick Bradley Racing 20	1:42.18

== See also ==
- List of French flat horse races
