= Prix Bertrand de Tarragon =

Flat horse race in France

- Class: Group 3
- Location: Chantilly; France
- Race type: Flat / Thoroughbred

Race information
- Distance: 1,800 metres (1m 1f)
- Surface: Turf
- Track: Straight
- Qualification: Three-years-old and up fillies and mares
- Weight: 56 kg (3yo); 58kg (4yo+)
- Purse: €80,000 (2021); 1st: €40,000

Prix Bertrand du Tarragon
2025
Zabeel Light	Royal Dress	Relaxx

Previous years
2023
Immensitude	Autumn Starlight	Life In Motion
2022
Mrs Fitzherbert	Sundoro	Kennella
2021
Waliyak	Sweet Lady	All Rumours

2020-2011
2020
Fonthill Abbey	Thalyia	Suphala
2019
Silva	Duneflower	Spirit Of Nelson
2018
My Sister Nat	Awesometank	Shahnaza
2017
Golden Legend	Via Firenze	Heuristique
2016
Aim To Please	Sayana	Irish Rookie
2015
Persona Grata	Deauville Shower	Sparkling Beam
2014
Entree	Visoriyna	Lavender Lane

The Prix Bertrand de Tarragon is a Group 3 flat horse race in France open to thoroughbred fillies and mares aged three years or older. It is run over a distance of 1,800 metres (about 9 furlongs) at Chantilly in September. It was run at Maisons-Laffitte until 2017 and at Longchamp in 2018 and 2019. It was previously contested at Listed level and raised to Group 3 status from the 2016 running.

== Winners since 2014 ==
Year	Winner	Age	Jockey	Trainer	Owner	Time
2014	Entree	4	Stéphane Pasquier	Pascal Bary	Khalid Abdullah	1:57.04
2015	Persona Grata	4	Stéphane Pasquier	Ed Walker	Middleham Park Racing	1:56.95
2016	Aim To Please	3	Gérald Mossé	François Doumen	Joerg Vasicek	1:49.58
2017	Golden Legend	3	Alexis Badel	Henri-Francois Devin	Mme Henri Devin	1:54.75
2018	My Sister Nat	3	Mickael Barzalona	Francis-Henri Graffard	Gemini Stud	1:54.91
2019	Silva	3	Theo Bachelot	Pia Brandt	Zalim Bifov	1:54.65
2020	Fonthill Abbey	4	Mickael Barzalona	André Fabre	Godolphin	1:49.95
2021	Waliyak	4	Cristian Demuro	Roger Varian	Fawzi Abdulla Nass	1:53.39
2022	Mrs Fitzherbert	4	Cristian Demuro	Hughie Morrison	Sonia M Rogers & Anthony Rogers	1:48.01
2023	Immensitude	3	Alexis Pouchin	S Wattel	Mme Isabelle Corbani	1:49.89
2026	Anakova	4	Maxime Guyon	André & Lavinia Fabre	Wertheimer et Frère	1:47.14

== See also ==
- List of French flat horse races
