= 2011 Epsom Derby =

- Derby
- Location: Epsom Downs Racecourse
- Date: 4 June 2011
- Winning horse: Pour Moi
- Starting price: 4/1
- Jockey: Mickael Barzalona
- Trainer: André Fabre
- Owner: Sue Magnier, Michael Tabor and Derrick Smith
- Conditions: Good to firm

External videos
- Replay of the 2011 Derby in full BBC Sport

Epsom Derby 2011
1-2-3
Pour Moi	Treasure Beach	Carlton House

Also Ran
4-5-6
Memphis Tennessee	Native Khan	Recital
7-8-9
Vadamar	Masked Marvel	Pisco Sour
10-11-12
Seville	Ocean War	Castlemorris King
13
Marhaba Malyoon	13 Ran	2m 34.54s

The 2011 Epsom Derby was the 232nd running of the Derby horse race which took place at Epsom Downs Racecourse, England, on 4 June 2011.

The race was won by second-favourite Pour Moi, the first Derby winner to have been trained in France since Empery in 1976.

The winning horse was ridden by jockey Mickael Barzalona and trained by André Fabre. Pour Moi beat Treasure Beach by a head; Carlton House, the pre-race favourite at 5/2, finished third by three-quarters of a length. Carlton House was owned by Elizabeth II.

== Race details ==
- Sponsor: Investec
- Winner's prize money: £709,625
- Going: Good to firm (good in places)
- Number of runners: 13
- Winner's time: 2 minutes, 34.54 seconds

== Full result ==
	Dist *	Horse	Jockey	Trainer ^{†}	SP
1		Pour Moi	Mickael Barzalona	André Fabre (FRA)	4/1
2	hd	Treasure Beach	Colm O'Donoghue	Aidan O'Brien (IRE)	25/1
3	¾	Carlton House	Ryan Moore	Sir Michael Stoute	5/2 fav
4	¾	Memphis Tennessee	Joseph O'Brien	Aidan O'Brien (IRE)	20/1
5	¾	Native Khan	Johnny Murtagh	Ed Dunlop	8/1
6	2	Recital	Pat Smullen	Aidan O'Brien (IRE)	5/1
7	nk	Vadamar	Christophe Lemaire	Alain de Royer-Dupré (FRA)	14/1
8	4	Masked Marvel	William Buick	John Gosden	25/1
9	19	Pisco Sour	Jimmy Fortune	Hughie Morrison	50/1
10	3	Seville	Christophe Soumillon	Aidan O'Brien (IRE)	13/2
11	7	Ocean War	Frankie Dettori	Mahmood Al Zarooni	12/1
12	3¼	Castlemorris King	Mark Coumbe	Michael Attwater	150/1
13	55	Marhaba Malyoon	Jamie Spencer	David Simcock	100/1

* The distances between the horses are shown in lengths or shorter; hd = head, nk = neck.
† Trainers are based in Great Britain unless indicated.

== Winner details ==
Further details of the winner, Pour Moi:

- Foaled: 10 January 2008, in Ireland
- Sire: Montjeu; Dam: Gwynn (Darshaan)
- Owner: Sue Magnier, Michael Tabor and Derrick Smith
- Breeder: Lynch Bages, Ltd.

== Form analysis ==
=== Two-year-old races ===
Notable runs by the future Derby participants as two-year-olds in 2010:

- Treasure Beach – 3rd in Royal Lodge Stakes
- Native Khan – 1st in Solario Stakes; 4th in Racing Post Trophy
- Recital – 1st in Critérium de Saint-Cloud
- Masked Marvel – 6th in Autumn Stakes
- Pisco Sour – 2nd in Tattersalls Millions 2YO Trophy; 8th in Critérium International
- Seville – 2nd in Racing Post Trophy
- Castlemorris King – 5th in Champagne Stakes

=== The road to Epsom ===
Early-season appearances in 2011 and trial races prior to running in the Derby:

- Pour Moi – 3rd in Prix La Force; 1st in Prix Greffulhe
- Treasure Beach – 1st in Chester Vase
- Carlton House – 1st in Dante Stakes
- Memphis Tennessee – 2nd in Derrinstown Stud Derby Trial
- Native Khan – 1st in Craven Stakes; 3rd in 2,000 Guineas Stakes
- Recital – 3rd in Ballysax Stakes; 1st in Derrinstown Stud Derby Trial
- Vadamar – 1st in Prix François Mathet; 3rd in Prix Greffulhe
- Masked Marvel – 5th in Sandown Classic Trial; 1st in Cocked Hat Stakes
- Pisco Sour – 3rd in Dante Stakes
- Seville – 2nd in Dante Stakes
- Ocean War – 1st in Newmarket Stakes
- Marhaba Malyoon – 6th in Lingfield Derby Trial

=== Subsequent Group 1 wins ===
Group 1 / Grade I victories after running in the Derby:

- Treasure Beach – Irish Derby (2011), Secretariat Stakes (2011)
- Masked Marvel - St. Leger Stakes (2011)

== Subsequent breeding careers ==
Leading progeny of participants in the 2011 Epsom Derby.

=== Sires of Classic winners ===
Pour Moi (1st)

- Wings Of Eagles - 1st Epsom Derby (2017)
- Sacred Elixir - 1st J. J. Atkins (2016)
- Rosenpurpur - 3rd Deutsches Derby (2017)
- Coeur de Lion - 2nd Triumph Trial Juvenile Hurdle (2016)

=== Other Stallions ===
Treasure Beach (2nd) - Exported to America - Shuttles to Argentina where sire of multiple Grade 1 winners
Masked Marvel (8th) - Jumps winners
Carlton House (3rd) - Exported to Australia
Memphis Tennessee (4th) -Exported to Argentina
Native Khan (5th) - Exported to Turkey
Recital (6th) - Minor jumps runners - Exported to Argentina
Seville (10th) - Exported to America
