= Daryakana =

French Thoroughbred racehorse

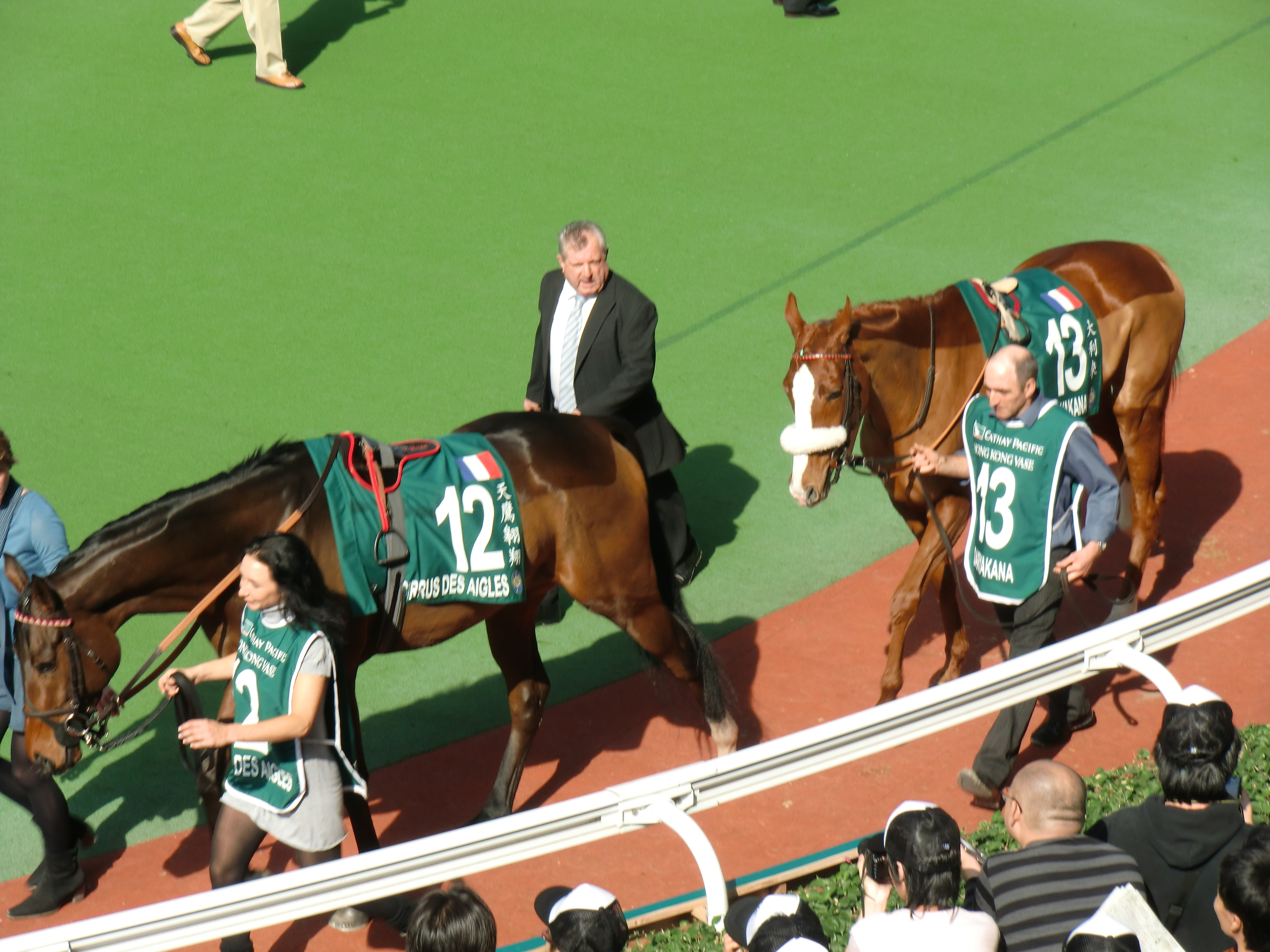
- Daryakana at 2009 Hong Kong Vase
- Sire: Selkirk
- Grandsire: Sharpen Up
- Dam: Daryaba
- Damsire: Night Shift
- Sex: Mare
- Foaled: 2006
- Country: France
- Colour: Chestnut
- Breeder: H H Aga Khan's Studs
- Owner: H H Aga Khan
- Trainer: Alain de Royer-Dupré
- Record: 9: 5-0-2
- Earnings: $1,209,342

Major wins
- Prix de Royallieu (2009); Hong Kong Vase (2009)

Daryakana (foaled 14 April 2006) is a retired French Thoroughbred racehorse. She was undefeated as a three-year-old in 2009 when her wins included the Prix de Royallieu and the Hong Kong Vase. She was retired and turned to broodmare after failing to win in 2010.

== Background ==
Daryakana, a chestnut mare with a white blaze, was bred in France by her owner the Aga Khan. She was sired by the American-bred miler Selkirk who won the Queen Elizabeth II Stakes and the Lockinge Stakes when trained in Britain. Daryakana's dam Daryaba won the Prix de Diane and the Prix Vermeille for the Aga Khan in 1999.

== Racing career ==
=== 2009: three-year-old season ===
Unraced at two, Daryakana did not appear on the racecourse until July 2009 when she won the Prix Blangy Pont over 2400m at Clarefontaine. A month later she was moved up in distance and won the Prix de Troarn over 2800m at Deauville. In September Daryakana ran in her first Conditions race and took the Listed Prix Tourelles at Chantilly. At the Arc meeting at Longchamp in October Daryakana contested her first Group race and maintained her unbeaten record by winning the Prix de Royallieu from Peinture Rare and Plumania. On her final start of the season Daryakana was sent to Sha Tin Racecourse for the Hong Kong Vase, where her opponents included Youmzain, Viva Pataca, Jaguar Mail, Kasbah Bliss and Cirrus des Aigles. Ridden by Gerald Mosse, the filly was restrained in last place in the early stages before making her challenge on the outside in the straight. She reached the front in the last strides to win by a short head from Spanish Moon.

=== 2010: four-year-old season ===
Dayakana made her first appearance of 2010 in the Prix Corrida in May. She finished strongly but lost her unbeaten record as she finished third to Plumania. In July she again finished third to Plumania in the Grand Prix de Saint-Cloud. Later that month she was sent to Britain for the King George VI and Queen Elizabeth Stakes. She finished fourth behind Harbinger, Cape Blanco and Youmzain, ahead of The Derby winner Workforce. On her final appearance she finished fifth of the six runners behind John Gosden's Duncan in the Prix Foy.
