= Sealiway =

French Thoroughbred racehorse

- Racing silks of Le Haras de La Gousserie
- Sire: Galiway
- Grandsire: Galileo
- Dam: Kensea
- Damsire: Kendargent
- Sex: Colt
- Foaled: 24 February 2018
- Country: France
- Colour: Chestnut
- Breeder: Guy Pariente
- Owner: Le Haras de La Gousserie & Guy Pariente
- Trainer: Frederic Rossi; Cedric Rossi
- Record: 12: 5-3-1
- Earnings: £1,375,997

Major wins
- Prix des Jouvenceaux et des Jouvencelles (2020); Prix Jean-Luc Lagardère (2020); Champion Stakes (2021)

Sealiway (foaled 24 February 2018) is a French Thoroughbred racehorse. He was one of the best two-year-olds in Europe in 2020 when he won four of his seven races including an eight length victory in the Prix Jean-Luc Lagardère. He was beaten in his first four races as a three-year-old but returned to winning form in autumn to take the Champion Stakes.

== Background ==
Sealiway is a chestnut colt with a white blaze and three white socks bred in France by Guy Pariente. As a yearling he was consigned to the Arqana sale at Deauville in August 2019 and was bought for €62,000 by the bloodstock agent Paul Nataf on behalf of the Haras de La Gousserie. Pariente, however, retained a share in the colt. Sealiway was sent into training with Frederic Rossi.

He was from the second crop of foals sired by Galiway who won two of his six races including the Listed Prix Le Fabuleux before being retired from racing at the end of his three-year-old season. Sealiway's dam Kensea showed good racing ability, winning two of her eleven races including the Listed Prix Herod. She was a female-line descendant of the French broodmare Nadika, making her a distant relative of Pandofell (Ascot Gold Cup), and Ranimer (Sun Chariot Stakes) as well as the leading National Hunt performers Tiger Roll and Iris's Gift.

== Racing career ==
=== 2020: two-year-old season ===
Sealiway was ridden in his first three races by Pierre-Charles Boudot. The colt made a successful racecourse debut when he started at odds of 3.2/1 for a maiden race over 1200 metres at Saint-Cloud Racecourse on 12 May and won by two lengths from thirteen opponents. In the following month he followed up in a minor race over the same distance at Chantilly Racecourse, going off the odds-on favourite and prevailing by a short head from the filly Cassiopea. He was then moved up in class and distance and sustained his first defeat as he came home third behind King's Harlequin and Go Athletico in the Listed Prix Roland de Chambure over 1400 metres at Longchamp Racecourse in July.

Franck Blondel took the ride when Sealiway contested the Listed Prix des Jouvenceaux et des Jouvencelles over 1400 metres at Vichy Racecourse on 6 August when he started the 1.5/1 favourite and won by five lengths from Stormy Pouss with a further three lengths back to Central Park West in third place. In the Group 3 Prix La Rochette at Longchamp on 6 September he was ridden by Mickael Barzalona and ran second to Go Athletico, after being outpaced by the winner in the closing stages.

Barzalona was again in the saddle when Sealiway was stepped up to the highest level to contest the Group 1 Prix Jean-Luc Lagardère over 1400 metres on heavy ground at Longchamp on 4 October. He started the 2.9/1 second choice in the betting behind the Coventry Stakes winner Nando Parrado in a five-runner field which also included Law of Indices (Railway Stakes), Libertine and Cairn Gorm (Prix de Cabourg). After racing in second place behind Cairn Gorm he took the lead 400 metres from the finish and drew right away from his opponents to win by eight lengths. After the race Rossi said "Wow! I've always thought he was a really good horse, and he ran over too short a trip to begin with. We decided to ride him more positively. He loves to dominate, and you have to ride him more in the English style than the French. He doesn't sprint, he's a real steamroller. Before today he has never quite run the way he trained, and I told the jockey I was pretty confident that if he could just do what he does in the mornings, the race would be over as a contest.

For his final run of the year, Sealiway was to the United States to contest the Grade I Breeders' Cup Juvenile Turf over one mile at Keeneland on 6 November. Ridden by Barzalona he raced towards the rear before making steady progress in the last three furlongs but never looked likely to win and came home fifth of the fourteen runners, four and three quarter lengths behind the winner Fire At Will.

In the official European classification of for 2020 Sealiway was given a rating of 116, making him the fifth best two-year-old of the season four pounds behind the top-rated St Mark's Basilica.

=== 2021: three-year-old season ===
On 18 April Sealiway began his second campaign in the Grade 3 Prix de Fontainebleau over 1600 metres on good ground at Longchamp. After settling in fourth place he made steady progress in the closing stages but was beaten into second place by Policy of Truth, finishing half a length behind the winner.

== Pedigree ==
Pedigree of Sealiway (GB), chestnut colt, 2018
Sire Galiway (GB) 2011	Galileo (IRE); 1998	Sadler's Wells (USA)	Northern Dancer (CAN)
Sire Galiway (GB) 2011	Galileo (IRE); 1998	Sadler's Wells (USA)	Fairy Bridge
Sire Galiway (GB) 2011	Galileo (IRE); 1998	Urban Sea (USA)	Miswaki
Sire Galiway (GB) 2011	Galileo (IRE); 1998	Urban Sea (USA)	Allegretta (GB)
Sire Galiway (GB) 2011	Danzigaway (USA); 1996	Danehill	Danzig
Sire Galiway (GB) 2011	Danzigaway (USA); 1996	Danehill	Razyana
Sire Galiway (GB) 2011	Danzigaway (USA); 1996	Blushing Away* (USA)	Blushing Groom (FR)
Sire Galiway (GB) 2011	Danzigaway (USA); 1996	Blushing Away* (USA)	Sweet Revenge
Dam Kensea (FR) 2010	Kendargent (FR); 2003	Kendor	Kenmare
Dam Kensea (FR) 2010	Kendargent (FR); 2003	Kendor	Belle Mecene
Dam Kensea (FR) 2010	Kendargent (FR); 2003	Pax Bello	Linamix
Dam Kensea (FR) 2010	Kendargent (FR); 2003	Pax Bello	Palavera
Dam Kensea (FR) 2010	Sea Island (FR); 2004	Gold Away (IRE)	Goldneyev (USA)
Dam Kensea (FR) 2010	Sea Island (FR); 2004	Gold Away (IRE)	Blushing Away* (USA)
Dam Kensea (FR) 2010	Sea Island (FR); 2004	Equitorale	Saint Estephe
Dam Kensea (FR) 2010	Sea Island (FR); 2004	Equitorale	En Evant (GB) (Family: 31)

* Sealiway is inbred 3S x 4D to the mare Blushing Away, meaning that she appears third generation on the sire side of his pedigree and fourth on the dam side of his pedigree.
