= Daryaba =

Irish-bred Thoroughbred racehorse

- Sire: Night Shift
- Grandsire: Northern Dancer
- Dam: Darata
- Damsire: Vayrann
- Sex: Mare
- Foaled: 14 May 1996
- Country: Ireland
- Colour: Bay
- Breeder: Aga Khan IV
- Owner: Aga Khan IV
- Trainer: Alain de Royer-Dupré
- Record: 5: 3-1-0
- Earnings: £250,101

Major wins
- Prix de Diane (1999); Prix Vermeille (1999)

Daryaba (foaled 14 May 1996) was an Irish-bred, French-trained Thoroughbred racehorse and broodmare. In a brief track career she won three of her five starts between April and October 1999. After finishing second on her debut she won a minor race before taking the Prix de Diane and went on to win the Prix Vermeille in autumn before coming home unplaced in the Prix de l'Arc de Triomphe. As a broodmare, she produced several good winners including Daryakana.

== Background ==
Daryaba was a bay mare with a white star bred in Ireland by her owner, Aga Khan IV. She was sent into training with Alain de Royer-Dupré in France and was ridden all of her races by Gerald Mosse.

She was sired by the American-bred stallion Night Shift, a son of Northern Dancer. Night Shift sired many other good racehorses in a long stud career, including In The Groove, Azamour, Well Chief and Lochangel. Daryaba's dam Darata showed some racing ability, winning a Listed race in France in 1991 She was a half-sister to Daralinsha, the ancestor of Darjina and Darsi.

== Racing career ==
On her racecourse debut Daryaba started at odds of 5/1 for a minor race over 2000 metres on soft ground at Chantilly Racecourse on 26 April and produced a "promising" effort as she finished second of the twelve runners, two and a half lengths behind the winner Shabby Chic. Three weeks later, over the same course and distance, the filly started odds-on favourite for a similar event and recorded her first success as she took the lead 200 metres from the finish and won "very easily" by four lengths.

On 13 June Daryaba was stepped up sharply in class to contest the Group 1 Prix de Diane over 2100 metres at Chantilly and started the 5.8/1 second favourite behind the Prix Vanteaux winner Star of Akkar. The other twelve runners included Calando (May Hill Stakes), Juvenia (Prix Marcel Boussac), Cerulean Sky (Prix Saint-Alary) and La Sylphide (Prix Penelope). In a change of tactics, Daryaba led from the start and stayed on well in the straight to win by a length from Star of Akkar. Mosse commented "The trainer told me to ride her the way I felt. There was no pace on, so off I went in front".

Daryaba was aimed at the Prix de la Nonette at Deauville Racecourse in August but was withdrawn after contracting a respiratory infection. After an absence of almost two months Daryaba returned for the Prix Vermeille over 2400 metres at Longchamp Racecourse on 12 September. Coupled in the betting with the Aga Khan's other runner Edabiya she started the 4/5 favourite ahead of nine other opponents including Fairy Queen (Ribblesdale Stakes), Etizaaz (Atalanta Stakes), Juvenia, Cerulean Sky, La Sylphide and Mother of Pearl (Prix Saint-Roman). After racing in third place behind Etizaaz, she took the lead 200 metres out and accelerated away to win by two and a half lengths. Royer-Dupre said "Daryaba was very well, so I wasn't surprised she won. What was important for her was that she won in a style which proved her victory in the Diane was no fluke. She's done very well from the spring to the autumn. The filly was always going well and now we'll be looking at the Arc de Triomphe".

On 3 October, over the same course and distance, the filly started the 7.6/1 fifth choice in a fourteen-runner field for the Prix de l'Arc de Triomphe but after being in contention for the first half of the race she dropped out of contention and finished thirteenth.

== Breeding record ==
At the end of her racing career, Daryaba was retired to become a broodmare for the Aga Khan's stud. She produced 11 foals and five winners between 2001 and 2016:

- Daryamar, a chestnut colt (later gelded) foaled in 2001, sired by Machiavellian. Won one race.
- Daramsar, bay colt, 2003, by Rainbow Quest. Won five races including the Prix du Conseil de Paris.
- Douraya, bay filly, 2004, by Sendawar. Won her only race.
- Dardania, grey filly, 2005, by Dalakhani.Third in only race.
- Daryakana, chestnut filly, 2006, by Selkirk. Won five races including Hong Kong Vase. Dam of Dariyan (Prix Ganay)
- Daryla, chestnut filly, 2009, by Mr Greeley
- Darysina, bay filly, 2010, by Smart Strike. Failed to win in three races.
- Daraybi, brown colt, 2011, by Street Cry. Won three races including the Listed Prix Marchand d'Or.
- Dariyba, bay filly, 2013, by Monsun. Unplaced in only race.
- Darayem, bay colt (gelded), 2014, by Redoute's Choice
- Daralimi, colt, 2016, by Siyouni

== Pedigree ==
Pedigree of Daryaba (IRE), bay mare, 1996
Sire Night Shift (USA) 1980	Northern Dancer (CAN); 1961	Nearctic	Nearco (ITY)
Sire Night Shift (USA) 1980	Northern Dancer (CAN); 1961	Nearctic	Lady Angela (GB)
Sire Night Shift (USA) 1980	Northern Dancer (CAN); 1961	Natalma (USA)	Native Dancer
Sire Night Shift (USA) 1980	Northern Dancer (CAN); 1961	Natalma (USA)	Almahmoud
Sire Night Shift (USA) 1980	Ciboulette (CAN); 1961	Chop Chop (USA)	Flares
Sire Night Shift (USA) 1980	Ciboulette (CAN); 1961	Chop Chop (USA)	Sceptical (GB)
Sire Night Shift (USA) 1980	Ciboulette (CAN); 1961	Windy Answer	Windfields
Sire Night Shift (USA) 1980	Ciboulette (CAN); 1961	Windy Answer	Reply
Dam Darata (IRE) 1988	Vayrann; 1978	Brigadier Gerard (GB)	Queen's Hussar
Dam Darata (IRE) 1988	Vayrann; 1978	Brigadier Gerard (GB)	La Paiva
Dam Darata (IRE) 1988	Vayrann; 1978	Val Divine (FR)	Val de Loir
Dam Darata (IRE) 1988	Vayrann; 1978	Val Divine (FR)	Pola Bella
Dam Darata (IRE) 1988	Darazina (FR); 1979	Labus	Busted (GB)
Dam Darata (IRE) 1988	Darazina (FR); 1979	Labus	Cordovilla
Dam Darata (IRE) 1988	Darazina (FR); 1979	Djebellina	Charlottesville (GB)
Dam Darata (IRE) 1988	Darazina (FR); 1979	Djebellina	Dalama (Family: 1-e)
