= Mickael Barzalona =

French jockey

Mickaël Barzalona
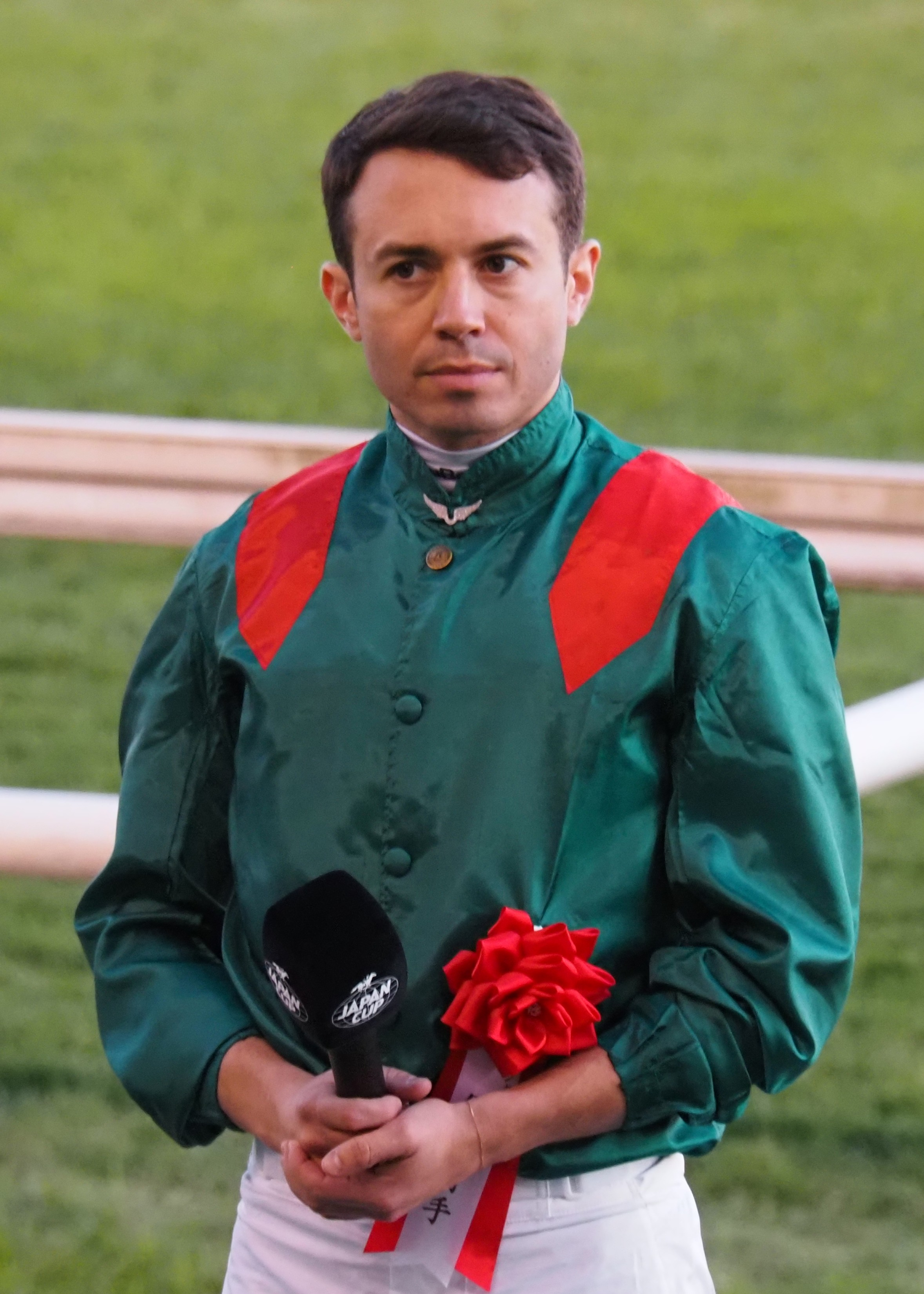
- Mickaël Barzalona at the 2025 Japan Cup

Personal information
- Born: 3 August 1991 (age 35) Avignon, France
- Occupation: Jockey

Horse racing career
- Sport: Horse racing

Major racing wins
- Dubai World Cup, Epsom Derby, St. Leger, Poule d'Essai des Poulains, Poule d'Essai des Pouliches, Champion Stakes, Breeders' Cup Turf, Prix de l'Arc de Triomphe, Japan Cup, Mile Championship, Dubai Sheema Classic

Racing awards
- French flat racing Champion Jockey (2021)

Significant horses
- Encke, Monterosso, Pour Moi, Talismanic, Sealiway, Calandagan, Erdenali, Daryz

Mickaël Barzalona (born 3 August 1991 in Avignon, France) is a French thoroughbred horse racing jockey, who is the retained jockey in France for the Aga Khan's racing operation.

== Career ==
Barzalona was born into a racing family, his grandfather is Christian Barzalona, a trainer based in Corsica, and his uncle Armand Barzalona, a former flat and jumps jockey. Barzalona began his career with André Fabre as an apprentice in 2009 and rode out his claim within the year with 72 wins. His first victory for the Godolphin team came at the Dubai Gold Cup in Meydan, before winning his first Group 1 with Wavering in the Prix Saint-Alary at ParisLongchamp.

In June 2011, Barzalona rode Pour Moi to win the 2011 Epsom Derby at Epsom, performing a remarkable in-race move from last place to 1st over the final straight, winning by a head. As he approached the finish line, Barzalona stood up in the stirrups and celebrated. This caused much comment and photos in the media following the race. Less than 2 weeks later, Barzalona rode a good race to take 16-1 underdog, Opinion Poll to 2nd place in the Gold Cup at Ascot behind odds-on favourite and defending champion, Fame and Glory. Barzalona also won the 2011 running of the Premio Roma in Italy on Zazou.

In March 2012, Barzalona was announced as a Godolphin jockey alongside Silvestre de Sousa. Later that month he comfortably won the $10 million Dubai World Cup, riding 20-1 outsider Monterosso from the Godolphin stable. It was Godolphin's first Dubai World Cup win since 2006. He won his second English classic aboard Encke in the 2012 St Leger.

In 2014, Barzalona returned to France and became Godolphin's lead jockey in the country. This came after he was demoted from the main jockey with trainer Charlie Appleby for Godolphin. He has since added a number of Group 1 wins there, riding horses such as Victor Ludorum, Castle Lady, Ultra and Kitesurf. In 2021 Barzalona was crowned Champion Jockey in France with 192 wins.

Outside France, Barzalona has achieved successes at Group 1 level. He won the 2017 Breeders' Cup Turf with Talismanic, and has four victories in the Al Maktoum Challenge, Round 3 at Meydan. He returned to the Great Britain to take victory in the 2019 Middle Park Stakes with Earthlight.

=== The Arc with Daryz and history with Calandagan (2025) ===
In 2025, Barzalona claimed a title haul spanning of, the Prix de l'arc de Triomphe win with Daryz, 2 wins at Ascot Racecourse (King George VI and Queen Elizabeth Stakes and Champion Stakes) and the Grand Prix de Saint-Cloud with Calandagan. His crowning achievement came on November 30, when he and Calandagan went to Tokyo Racecourse to participate in the Japan Cup G1 as the only foreign entry in the field. Calandagan was set at the 4th favourite in the Japan betting ranks only behind Danon Decile (Who beat Calandagan at the Dubai Sheema Classic), Croix Du Nord (finished 14th in the same field as Barzalona in the Arc) and Masquerade Ball (the Tenno Sho Autumn winner), the latter ridden by fellow countryman and serial JRA winner Christophe Lemaire (he himself was hoping to equal Japan's legendary jockey Yutaka Take with 5 Japan Cup wins). In the race, starting from gate 8, Barzalona and Calandagan stayed near the back of the field until the last 300m, where they and Lemaire shot up to the front of the pack and were neck and neck alongside Admire Terra (who unmounted their Jockey from the start and was Disqualified). Calandagan ended up beating Masquerade Ball by a head and setting a course record at 2,400m of 2:20.3, beating the previous record set by 2018 Japan Cup winner, Almond Eye (who was jockeyed by Lemaire at the time). Shortly after the winning line, Lemaire and Barzalona shared a handshake of respect. Calandagan became the first foreign horse to win the Japan Cup since Alkaased in 2005 and the first French trained horse since Le Glorieux in 1987. Barzalona became only the 4th different French Jockey to win the Japan Cup, after Alain Lequeux in 1987, Olivier Peslier in 2001 (With Jungle Pocket), 2004 (with Zenno Rob Roy) and Christophe Lemaire with 4 wins (2009 with Vodka, 2018 and 2020, both with Almond Eye, and 2023 with Equinox).

== Major wins ==
France

- Grand Prix de Saint-Cloud - (2) - Calandagan (2025-2026)
- Poule d'Essai des Poulains - (3) - Victor Ludorum (2020), Marhaba Ya Sanafi (2023), Rayif (2026)
- Poule d'Essai des Pouliches - (2) - Castle Lady (2019), Zarigana (2025)
- Prix de l'Arc de Triomphe - (1) - Daryz (2025, 2026)
- Prix de l'Opéra - (1) - Place Du Carrousel (2022)
- Prix de Royallieu - (1) - Fairy Glen (2026)
- Prix Ganay - (2) - Cloth of Stars (2017), Daryz (2026)
- Prix Jacques Le Marois - (1) - Rayif (2026)
- Prix Jean-Luc Lagardère - (4) - Ultra (2015), Victor Ludorum (2019), Sealiway (2020), Belbek (2022)
- Prix Jean Prat - (2) - Havana Gold (2013), Territories (2015)
- Prix Saint-Alary - (1) - Wavering (2011),
- Prix Vermeille - (1) - Kitesurf (2018)
- Prix Morny - (1) - Earthlight (2019)
- Prix Maurice de Gheest - (1) - Marianafoot (2021)
- Prix du Moulin de Longchamp - (2) - Tribalist (2024), Sahlan (2025), Erdenali (2026)
- Prix d'Ispahan - (1) - Daryz (2026)

Germany

- Preis von Europa - (1) - Sibayan (2025)

(United Kingdom) Great Britain

- King George VI and Queen Elizabeth Stakes - (1) - Calandagan (2025)
- Champion Stakes - (2) - Sealiway (2021), Calandagan (2025)
- Epsom Derby - (1) - Pour Moi (2011)
- Fillies' Mile - (1) - Certify (2012)
- St. Leger - (1) - Encke (2012)
- Middle Park Stakes - (1) - Earthlight (2019)

Italy

- Premio Roma - (1) - Zazou (2011)

Japan

- Japan Cup - (1) - Calandagan (2025)
- Mile Championship - (1) - Erdenali (2026)

United Arab Emirates

- Dubai World Cup - (1) - Monterosso (2012)
- Al Maktoum Challenge, Round 3 - (4) - Long River (2017), Capezzano (2019), Matterhorn (2020), Hypothetical (2022)
- Dubai Sheema Classic - (1) - Calandagan (2026)

United States

- Breeders' Cup Turf - (1) - Talismanic (2017)
- Breeders' Cup Filly & Mare Turf – (1) – Gezora (2025)
